= List of Italian films of 1966 =

A list of films produced in Italy in 1966 (see 1966 in film):

Italian films released in 1966
Title	Director	Cast	Genre	Notes
00/ciak operazione mondo	Marino Marzano	Femi Benussi, Massimo Searato	Film revue	Local distribution
4 dollari di vendetta	Jaime Jesús Balcázar.	Robert Woods	Western	Spanish-Italian co-production
5 dollari per Ringo	Ignacio F. Iquino	Anthony P. Taber	Western	Spanish-Italian co-production
A mosca cieca	Romano Scavloini	Carlo Cecchi, Laura Troschel	Experimental	Undistributed for censure reasons
A... For Assassin	Angelo Dorigo	Alan Steel, Mary Arden	Mystery	
A.D.3 operazione squalo bianco	Filippo Walter Ratti	Rod Dana	Spy film	
Adultery Italian Style	Pasquale Festa Campanile	Nino Manfredi, Catherine Spaak	Comedy	
Africa Addio	Gualtiero Jacopetti, Franco Prosperi		Documentary	
After the Fox	Vittorio De Sica	Peter Sellers	Comedy	
Agamennone	Mario Ferrero	Ivo Garrani, Sarah Ferrati	Drama	TV play
Agent 3S3: Massacre in the Sun	Sergio Sollima	Giorgio Ardisson	Spy film	
Agent 505: Death Trap in Beirut	Manfred R. Köhler	Frederick Stafford, Chris Howland, Harald Leipnitz	Spy film	West German-Italian-French co-production
Agent X-77 Orders to Kill	Maurice Cloche	Gérard Barray, Sylva Koscina	Spy film	Italian-Spanish-French co-production
Agente Logan – missione Ypotron	Giorgio Stegani	Luis Davila	Spy film	
Agente Segreto 070: Thunderbay Missione Grasshopper	Burton Van Hooven	Dan Christian	Spy film	Italian Hong-Kong co-production
Agente segreto 777 - Invito ad uccidere	Enrico Bomba	Lewis Jordan, Helene Chanel	Spy film	
Albero verde	Giuseppe Rolando	Natale Peretti	Religious	
Alla scoperta dell'Africa	Folco Quilici		Documentary	
The Almost Perfect Crime	Mario Camerini	Philippe Leroy, Pamela Tiffin, Graziella Granata	Detective comedy	
Alternative attuali	Raffaele Andreassi		Documentary	
America paese di Dio	Luigi Vanzi		Documentary	
Andremo in città	Nelo Risi	Geraldine Chaplin	Drama	
An Angel for Satan	Camillo Mastrocinque	Barbara Steele, Antonio De Teffé, Pier Anna Quaglia	Horror	
Angelique and the King	Bernard Borderie	Michèle Mercier	Historical adventure	French-Italian-German co-production
Anima gemella	Guglielmo Morandi	Evi Maltagliati, Antonio Battistella	Comedy	Tv play
Arizona Colt	Michele Lupo	Giuliano Gemma, Fernando Sancho	Western	Italian-French co-production
L'armata Brancaleone	Mario Monicelli	Vittorio Gassman, Gian Maria Volonté, Catherine Spaak	Comedy	
Assassinio nella cttedrale	Orazio Costa	Antonio Crast, Ugo Pagliai	Historical	TV play
Avventure di mare e di costa	Girgio Moser	Marco Guglielmi	Adventure	TV serial
Balearic Caper	José Maria Forqué	Jacques Sernas, Daniela Bianchi, Mireille Darc	Comedy	Spanish-French-Italian co-production
The Battle of Algiers	Gillo Pontecorvo	Brahim Hagiag, Jean Martin, Saadi Yacef	Drama	
Best seller	Gianfranco Bettetini	Armando Francioli, Carla Del Poggio	Drama	
The Bible: In the Beginning	John Huston	Michael Parks, Ulla Bergryd, Richard Harris	Adventure	Italian-American co-production
The Big Gundown	Sergio Sollima	Lee Van Cleef, Tomas Milian	Western	
Black Box Affair	Marcello Ciorciolini	Craig Hill	Spy film	
Black Sun	Denys de La Patellier	Michèle Mercier, Daniel Gelin, Valentina Cortese	Crime	Co-production with France
Blood at Sundown	Alberto Cardone	Antonio De Teffé, Gianni Garko, Erika Blanc		Italian-West German co-production
Blowup	Michelangelo Antonioni	David Hemmings, Vanessa Redgrave	Mystery	British-Italian co-production
Bob Fleming... Mission Casablanca	Antonio Margheriti	Richard Harrison	Spy story	
Boris Gudonov	Giuliana Berlinguer	Tino Carraro, Luigi Vannucchi	Historical	TV play
Borman	Bruno Paolinelli	Dominique Boschero, Liana Orfei	Spy story	Italian-French co-production
Brigade antigangs	Bernard Borderie	Robert Hossein, Raymond Pellegrin	Detective story	French-Italian co-production
A Bullet for the General	Damiano Damiani	Gian Maria Volonté, Klaus Kinski, Lou Castel	Western	
But You Were Dead	Gianni Vernuccio	Alex Morrison	Melodrama	
Cavaliere senza armatura	Giuseppe de Martino	Adolfo Geri, Regina Bianchi	Comedy	TV play
Che notte, ragazzi!	Giorgio Capitani	Philippe Leroy, Marisa Mell	Comedy	Italian-Spanish co-production
Corrida!	Marco Ferreri		TV documentary	
Corruzione al palazzo di giustizia	Daniele D'Anza	Tino Buazzelli, Glauco Mauri	Drama	TV play
Countdown to Doomsday	Marcello Baldi	Horst Frank, Harald Leipnitz, Christa Linder		Italian-West German-French co-production
Degueyo	Giuseppe Vari	Giacomo Rossi-Stuart, Dan Vadis, Rosy Zichel	Western	
Delitto d'amore	Juan de Orduna	Dominique Boschero, Amedeo Nazzari	Drama	Spanish-Italian co-production
Diario di bordo	Arsano Giannarelli, Pietro Nelli		Documentary	
Die tollen Nichten des Grafen Bobby	?	Karin Dor	Comedy	French-Italian-Austrian co-production
Dio, come ti amo	Miguel Iglesias	Gigliola Cinquetti	Musical	Italian-Spanish co-production
Django	Sergio Corbucci	Franco Nero, José Bódalo, Loredana Nusciak	Western	Italian-Spanish co-production
Django Shoots First	Alberto De Martino	Glenn Saxson, Ida Galli, Nando Gazzolo	Western	
Djurado	Gianni Narzisi	Dante Posani, Scilla Gabel, Luis Induni	Western	Italian-Spanish co-production
Dollar of Fire	Nick Nostro	Miguel de La Riva, Dada Gallotti, Alberto Farnese	Western	
Dollars for a Fast Gun	Joaquin Romero Marchent	Claudio Undari, Pamela Tudor, José Bódalo	Western	Spanish-Italian co-production
Don Giacinto a forza	Anton Giulio Majano	Nino Taranto, Maria Fiore	Comedy	TV play
Dos pistolas gemelas	Rafael Romero Marchent.	Pili and Mili	Western	Spanish-Italian co-production
The Double Bed	Jean Delannoy, Gianni Puccini	Michel Serrault, Lando Buzzanca	Anthological film	French-Italian co-production
Dr. Goldfoot and the Girl Bombs	Mario Bava	Vincent Price, Fabian, Francesco Mulé	Comedy	
Due dozzine di rose scarlatte	Flaminio Bollini	Alberto Lionello, Sandra Mondaini	Comedy	Tv play
Due mafiosi contro Al Capone	Giorgio Simonelli	Franco Franchi, Ciccio Ingrassia	Comedy	Spanish-Italian co-production
Due once di piombo	Maurizio Lucidi	Robert Woods	Western	
Duello nel mondo	Luigi Scattini, Georges Combret	Richard Harrison	Spy film	
Dynamite Jim	Alfonso Balcazar	Luis Davila, Fernando Sancho, Rosalba Neri	Western	Spanish-Italian co-production
È arrivato mr. John	Lelio Golletti	Tonia Schmitz, Aldo Wurz	For children	TV play
È mezzanotte, dr. Schweitzer	Eros Macchi	Tino Carraro, Valentina Fortunato	Historical	TV play
È mezzanotte, butta giù il cadavere	Guido Zurli	Luisa Rivelli, Lucia Modugno	Comedy thriller	
Ed egli si nascose	Giacomo Colli	Achille Millo, Mario Maranzana	Drama	TV play
Edipo a Colono	Maner Lualdi, Italo Alfaro	Annibale Ninchi, Maria Grazia Marescalchi	Drama	TV play
Edipo re	Maner Lualdi, Italo Alfaro	Gianni Santuccio, Maria Grazia Marescalchi	drama	TV play
Edoardo e Carolina	Vito Molinari	Paola Pitagora, Paolo Ferrari	Comedy	TV play
El aventurero de Guaynas	Joaquín Luis Romero Marchent.	John Richardson	Adventure	Spanish-Italian co-production
El Cisco	Sergio Bergonzelli	William Berger, George Wang, Antonella Murgia	Western	
El Greco	Luciano Salce	Mel Ferrer	Biopic	Italian-French co-production
El misterioso señor Van Eyck	Augustin Navarro	Franco Fabrizi	Spy film	Spanish-Italian co-production
El Rojo	Leopoldo Savona	Richard Harrison, Nieves Navarro, Piero Lulli	Western	Italian-Spanish co-production
Eroe vagabondo	Walter Santesso	Walter Santesso, Olga Sobell	Comedy	
Espi... ando	Francisco Ariza	Josè Maria Caffarel	Spy film	Spanish-Italian co-production
L'estate	Paolo Spinola	Enrico Maria Salerno, Nadja Tiller, Mita Medici	Drama	
Europa canta	Josè Luis Merino	Lucio Dalla	Musical	
Fedra	Sergio Velitti	Diana Torrieri, Gianni Santuccio	Drama	TV play
A Few Dollars for Django	León Klimovsky, Enzo G. Castellari	Antonio De Teffé	—N/a	Italian-Spanish co-production
A Fistful of Songs	José Luis Merino	Vivi Bach, Gustavo Rojo, Renzo Palmer	Western	Italian–Spanish–Lichtensteinian co-production
Five Dollars For Ringo	Juan Xiol Marchal	Julio Perez Tabernero, Alberto Famese, Maria Pia Conte	Western	Spanish–Italian co-production
Five Giants from Texas	Aldo Florio	Guy Madison, Monica Randall, Giovanni Cian Friglia	Western	Italian–Spanish co-production
For a Few Dollars Less	Mario Mattoli	Lando Buzzanca, Elio Pandolfi, Gloria Paul	Parody	
Fort Yuma Gold	Giorgio Ferroni	Giuliano Gemma, Dan Vadis, Sophie Daumier	Western	Italian–French–Spanish co-production
Four Dollars of Revenge	Jaime Jesus Balcazar	Robert Woods, Dana Ghia, Angelo Infanti	Western	Spanish–Italian co-production
Four Queens for an Ace	Jacques Poltrenaud	Roger Hanin, Sylvia Koscina	Spy film	Franch-Spanish-Italian co-production
Francesco d'Assisi	Liliana Cavani	Lou Castel	Biopic	TV movie
Fugitivos de las islas del sur	Javier Setò	James Philbrook	Adventure	Spanish-Italian co-production
Fumo di Londra	Alberto Sordi	Alberto Sordi	Comedy	Italian-English co-production
Furia a Marrakech	Mino Loy	Stephen Forsyth, Dominique Boschero	Spy film	
Galia	Georges Lautner	Mireille Darc, Francoise Prévost	thriller	French-Italian co-production
The Game Is Over	Roger Vadim	Jane Fonda, Peter McEnery	Drama	French-Italian co-production
Gatto Filippo: licenza d'incidere	Pino Zac, Daniele D'Anza		Cartoon, musical	The film mixes animated and filmed sequences
Giorno caldo al Paradiso Show	Enzo di Gianni	Aldo Bufi Landi, Peppino Di Capri	Musical	
Giufà e il pappagallo	Lelio Golletti	Carlo Croccolo	For children	TV play
Gli amori di Angelica	Luigi De Marchi	Claudie Lange, Joaquin Blanco	Peplum	Italian-Spanish co-production
Gli ultimi cinque minuti	Carlo Lodovici	Enrico Maria Salerno, Valeria Valeri	Comedy	TV play
Glisenti calibro nove	Claudio Fino	Lino Troisi, Germana Paolieri	Mystery	TV play
Go with God, Gringo	Edoardo Mulargia	Glenn Saxson, Lucretia Love, Ignazio Spalla	Western	
A Golden Sheriff	Osvaldo Civirani	Luigi Giuliani, Jacques Berthier, Caterina Trentini	Western	
The Good, the Bad and the Ugly	Sergio Leone	Clint Eastwood, Eli Wallach, Lee Van Cleef	Western	Italian-Spanish-West German co-production
The Hawks and the Sparrows	Pier Paolo Pasolini	Totò, Ninetto Davoli	Satire	
The Hills Run Red	Carlo Lizzani	Thomas Hunter. Henry Silva, Dan Duryea	Western	
How I Learned to Love Women	Luciano Salce	Robert Hoffmann, Romina Power, Elsa Martinelli	Comedy	Italian-French.German co-production
How to Seduce a Playboy	Michael Pfleghar	Peter Alexander, Antonella Lualdi, Scilla Gabel	Comedy	Austrian-Italian co-production
How We Robbed the Bank of Italy	Lucio Fulci	Franco e Ciccio	Comedy	
I cinque della vendetta	Aldo Florio	Guy Madison	Western	Italian-Spanish co-production
I diafanoidi vengono da Marte	Antonio Margheriti	Tony Russel, Franco Nero	Science fiction	
I due figli di Ringo	Giorgio Simonelli, Giuliano Carmineo	Franco and Ciccio	Western comedy	
I due sanculotti	Giorgio Simonelli	Franco and Ciccio	Historical comedy	
I legionari dello spazio	Italo Alfaro	Isa Crescenzi, Carlo Crccolo	Science-fiction for children	Serial TV
I nostri mariti	Dino Risi, Luigi Zampa, Luigi Filippo d'Amico	Alberto Sordi, Lando Buzzanca, Ugo Tognazzi	Comedy	
I paisan	Giuseppe Morandi		Documentary	
I tre del Colorado	Armando de Ossorio	George Martin	Western	Italian-Spanish co-production
I tre diavoli	Alvise Sapori	Alvaro Piccardi, Loretta Goggi	For children	TV play
Il biglietto vincente	Enrico Colosimo	Evi Maltagliati, Ennio Balbo	Comedy	TV play
Il caso Fuchs	Pietro Schivazappa	Franco Graziosi, Tino Carraro	Historical	TV play
Il conte di Montecristo	Edmo Fenoglio	Andrea Giordana, Giuliana Lojodice	Historical	TV serial
Il gioco delle spie	Paolo Bianchini	Roger Hanin, Rory Calhoun	Spy film	Italian-French co-production
il giorno della tartaruga	Carla Ragionieri	Renato Rascel, Delia Scala	Musical	TV play
Il grande colpo di Surcouf	Sergio Bergonzelli	Gerald Barray, Antonella Lualdi	Adventure	
Il labirinto	Silvio Maestranzi		Documentary	Short
Il marito della sua vedova	Flaminio Bollini	Franco Paerenti, Gianna Giachetti	Comedy	TV play
Il marito è mio e l'ammazzo quando mi pare	Pasquale festa Campanile	Catherine Spaak, Hugh Griffith	Comedy	
Il mestiere di dipingere	Valentino Orsini		Documentary	Short
Il Natale che quasi non fu	Rossano Brazzi	Rossano Brazzi, Paul Tripp	For children	American-Italian co-production
Il nero	Giovanni Vento		Documentary	
Il pane della follia	Guglielmo Morandi	Valentina Fortunato, Silvano Tranquilli	Comedy	TV play
Il pensiero	Italo Alfaro	Enrico Maria Salerno, Isa Danieli	Drama	TV play
Il pianeta errante	Antonio Margheriti	Giacomo Rossi Stuart	Science-fiction	
Il signor Rossi compra l'automobile	Bruno Bozzetto		Cartoon	
Il terzo visitatore	Enrico Colosimo	Renzo Montagnani, Edmonda Aldini	Drama	TV play
Il ventaglio	Fantasio Piccoli	Nino Besozzi, Fulvia Tellari	Comedy	TV play
Il ventaglio di Lady Windermere	Carlo di Stefano	Lucilla Morlacchi, Elena Zareschi	Comedy	TV play
Il vostro superagente Flit	Mariano Laurenti	Raimondo Vianello, Raffaella Carrà	Parody	
Im Nest der gelben Viper – Das FBI schlägt zu	Wolfgang Schnell, Alfredo Medori	Hellmut Lange, Massimo Serato	Spy film	Italia-German co-production
In the Shadow of the Eagles	Ferdinando Baldi	Cameron Mitchell, Beba Loncar	Peplum	Italian-West German-Yugoslavian co-production
Ischia operazione amore	Vittorio Sala	Walter Chiari, Ric e Gian	Comedy	
James Tont operazione D.U.E.	Bruno Corbucci	Lando Buzzanca	Parody	
Johnny Colt	Giovanni Grimaldi	Robert Woods, Elga Andersen, Franco Lantieri	Western	Italian-German co-production
Johnny Yuma	Romolo Guerrieri	Mark Damon, Lawrence Dobkin, Rosalba Neri	Western	
K.O. va e uccidi	Carlo Ferrero	Lucretia Love, Mauro Parenti	Drama	
Kill, Baby, Kill	Mario Bava	Giacomo Rossi-Stuart, Erika Blanc, Fabienne Dali	Horror	
Kill Johnny Ringo!	Gianfranco Baldanello	Brett Halsey, Greta Polyn, Nino Fuscagni	Western	
Kill or Be Killed	Tanio Boccia	Robert Mark, Elina de Witt, Fabrizio Moroni	Western	
Killer's Carnival	Louis Soulanes, Sheldon Reynolds, Alberto Cardone, Robert Lynn	Stewart Granger, Lex Barker	Anthology film	French-Austrian-Italian co-production
King of Hearts	Philippe de Broca	Alan Bates, Genevieve Bujold	Satirical	French-Italian co-production
Kiss Kiss...Bang Bang	Duccio Tessari	Giuliano Gemma, George Martin, Lorella De Luca	Spy film	Italian-Spanish co-production
Kiss Kiss, Kill Kill	Gianfranco Parolini	Tony Kendall	Spy film	West German-Italian co-production
Kommissar X – Drei gelbe Katzen	Gianfranco Parolini, Rudolf Zehetgruber	Tony Kendall	Spy film	West German-Italian-French-Austrian co-production
Kommissar X – In den Klauen des goldenen Drachen	Gianfranco Parolini	Tony Kendall	Spy film	West Germany-Italian-Yugoslavian-Singaporean co-production
Knives of the Avenger	Mario Bava	Cameron Mitchell, Fausto Tozzi, Giacomo Rossi Stuart	—N/a	
Kriminal	Umberto Lenzi	Roel Bos, Andrea Bosic, Helga Liné	—N/a	Italian-Spanish co-production
L'affare Beckett	Osvaldo Civirani	Lang Jeffries	Spy film	Italian-French co-production
L'arcidiavolo	Ettore Scola	Vittorio Gassmann, Claudine Auger, Mickey Rooney	Historical comedy	
L'homme de Mykonos	René Gainville	Gabriele Tinti, Anne Vernon	Drama	French-Italian-Belgian co-production
L'importanza di chiamarsi Ernesto	Flaminio Bollini	Gastone Moschin, Giancarlo Sbragia	Comedy	TV play
L'incrinatura	Alessandro Brissoni	Lilla Brignone, Gianni Santuccio	Comedy	TV play
L'innamorato della signora Maigret	Mario Landi	Gino Cervi, Oreste Lionello	Mystery	TV play (Le inchieste del commissario Maigret)
L'ippocampo	Franco Enriquez	Paolo Ferrari, Emma Danieli	Drama	TV play
L'ombra cinese	Mario Landi	Gino Cervi, Marina Malfatti	Mystery	TV play (Le inchieste del commissario Maigret)
L'orologio a cucù	Silverio Blasi	Carlo Giuffrè, Turi Ferro	Drama	TV play
L'uomo che ride	Sergio Corbucci	Jean Sorel, Lisa Gastoni	Historical	
L'uomo dalla pistola d'oro	Alfonso Balcazar	Fernando Sancho, Luis Davila	Western	Spanish-Italian co-production
L'urlo	Camillo Bazzoni	francesco Barilli	Science-fiction	Short
La battaglia dei mods (Crazy baby)	Franco Montemurro	Ricky Shayne	Musical	Italian-German co-production
La coscienza di Zeno	Daniele D'Anza	Alberto Lionello, Laura Rizzoli	Drama	TV serial
La famegia del santolo	Carlo Lodovici	Cesco Baseggio, Cesarina Gherlandi	Comedy	TV play
La felicità domestica	Gian Domenico Giagni	Lucilla Morlacchi, Massimo Girotti	Comedy	TV play
La legge della Mafia	Mario Bianchi	Savida Bertone, Gordon Wylliams	Drama	
La ley del Colt	Alfonso Brescia	Luis Davila, Miguel de la Riva	Western	Spanish-Italian co-production
La locanda azzurra	Anton Giulio Majano	Gastone Moschin, Stefano Sibaldi	Drama	TV play
La locandiera	Franco Enriquez	Valeria Moriconi, Franco Graziosi	Comedy	Tv play
La mujer perdida	Tulio Demicheli	Sarita Montiel, Massimo Serato	Drama	Spanish-French-Italian co-production
La notte dell'addio	Renato Borraccetti	Alessandra Panaro, Dan Daniels	Drama	
La pelliccia di castoro	Claudio Fino	Elsa Merlini, Luigi Santuccio	Drama	TV play
La ragazza del bersagliere	Alessandro Blasetti	Graziella Granata, Antonio Casagrande	Comedy	
La sentinelle endormie	Jean Dreville	Noel-Noel, Pascale Audret	Historical comedy	French-Italian co-production
La sera del sabato	Anton Giulio Majano	Aldo Giuffrè, Liana Trouche	Drama	TV play
La spia che viene dal mare	Lamberto Benvenuti	John Elliot	Spy film	
La sublime fatica	Luciano Emmer		Documentary	
La venganza de Clark Harrison	Josè Luis Madrid	Jim Reed	Western	Spanish-Italian co-production
La volpe e le camelie	Silverio Blasi	Massimo Girotti, Nando Gazzolo	Drama	TV play
Labanta negro	Pietro Nelli		Documentary	
Las malditas pistolas de Dallas	José Maria Zabalza	Angel Alvarez, Fred Behr	Western	Spanish-Italian-French co-production
Las siete magníficas	Rudolf Zehetgruber, Sidney W. Pink	Anne Baxter, Maria Perschy, Gustavo Rojo	Western	Italian-Spanish-Austrian co.production
Laura	Marcello Sartarelli	Scilla Gabel, Carlo D'Angelo	Mystery	TV play
Le baruffe chiozzotte	Girgio Strehler	Carla Gravina, Corrado Pani, Lina Volonghi	Comedy	TV play
Le coefore	Mario Ferrero	Sarah Ferrati, Vittorio Sanipoli	Drama	TV play
Le deuxième souffle	Jean-Pierre Melville	Lino Ventura. Paul Meurisse	Crime	French-Italian co-production
Le Eumenidi	Mario ferrero	Sarah Ferrati, Giulio Bosetti	Drama	TV play
Le Fate	Mauro Bolognini, Mario Monicelli, Antonio Pietrangeli, Luciano Salce	Monica Vitti, Claudia Cardinale, Raquel Welch, Capucine	Comedy	Italian-French coproduction
Le judoka, agent secret	Pierre Zimmer	Jean-Claude Bercq, Marilù Tolo	Spy film	French-Italian co-production
Le piacevoli notti	Armando Crispino, Luciano Lucignani	Vittorio Gassmann, Gina Lollobrigida	Comedy	
Le Saint prend l'affût	Christian-Jacque	Jean Marais, Raffaella Carrà	Adventure	
Le solitaire passe à l'attaque	Ralph Habib	Roger Hanin, Jean Lefebvre	Spy film	French-Italian co-production
Le spie amano i fiori	Umberto Lenzi	Roger Browne, Emma Danieli	Spy film	
Le spie uccidono in silenzio	Mario Caiano	Lang Jeffries, Erica Blanc	Spy film	
Le voyage du père	Denys de La Patelliére	Fernandel, Lili Palmer, Laurent Terzieff	Drama	French-Italian co-production
Legacy of the Incas	Georg Marischka	Guy Madison, Rik Battaglia, Geula Nuni	Western	Bulgarian–Italian–German–Spanish co-production
Les combinards	Juan Estelrich March, Riccardo Pazzaglia, Jean-Claude Roy	José Luis López Vázquez, Darry Cowl, Salvo Randone	Comedy	French-Spanish-italian co-production
Les grandes gueules	Robert Enrico	Bourvil, Lino Ventura	Drama	French-Italian co-production
Lightning Bolt	Antonio Margheriti	Anthony Eisley, Wandisa Guida, Folco Lulli	—N/a	Italian-Spanish co-production
Lo scandalo	Anna Gobbi	Philippe Leroy, Ainouk Aimée	Drama	
Lo squarciagola	Luigi Squarzina	Giancarlo Giannini, Paolo Ferrari	Musical	TV play
Love Italian Style	Steno	Walter Chiari, Raimondo Vianellio	Anthology film	
Luce a gas	Alessandro Brissoni	Anna Miserocchi, Gabriele Ferzetti	Thriller	TV play
Madame Curie	Guglielmo Morandi	Ileana Ghione, Raoul Grassilli	Biopic	TV serial
Madamigella di Maupin	Mauro Bolognini	Catherine Spaak, Robert Hossein	Historical	Italian-Spanish-French-Jugoslavian co-production
A Maiden for a Prince	Pasquale Festa Campanile	Vittorio Gassman, Virna Lisi	Comedy	
Maigret and His Greatest Case	Alfred Weidenmann	Heinz Rühmann, Françoise Prévost, Günther Stoll	Crime	Co-production with Austria, France and West Germany
Maigret a Pigalle	Mario Landi	Gino Cervi, Lila Kedrova	Mystery	French-Italian co-production
Maigret e l'ispettore sfortunato	Mario Landi	Gino Cervi, Antonio Battistella	Mystery	TV play (Le inchieste del commissario Maigret)
'Man on the Spying Trapeze	Juan de Orduña	Wayde Preston, Helga Sommerfeld, Reinhard Kolldehoff	Spy	Co-production with Spain and West Germany
Mano di velluto	Ettore Fecchi	Paolo Ferrari, Dominique Boschero	Comedy	
Marcia nuziale	Marco Ferreri	Ugo Tognazzi	Comedy	
Massacre in the Black Forest	Ferdinando Baldi	Cameron Mitchell, Antonella Lualdi	Peplum	German-Italian-Jugoslavian co-production
Massacre Time	Lucio Fulci	Franco Nero, George Hilton, Nino Castelnuovo	Western	
Me, Me, Me... and the Others	Alessandro Blasetti	Gina Lollobrigida, Silvana Mangano, Walter Chiari	Comedy	
Mi vedrai tornare	Ettore Maria Fizzarotti	Gianni Morandi	Musical	
Michelangelo Antonioni storia di un autore	Gianfranco Mingozzi		Documentary	
Misión Arenas Ardientes	Alfonso Brescia	Howard Ross, Anna Maria Polani	Peplum	Spanish-Italian co-production
Missione apocalisse	Guido Malatesta	Arthur Ansel	Spy film	Spanish-Italian co-production
Missione mortale Molo 83	Sergio Bergonzelli	Fred Beir, Anna Maria Pierangeli	Spy film	French-Italian co.production
Misunderstood	Luigi Comencini	Anthony Quayle, Stefano Colagrande, Simone Giannozzi	Drama	
The Mona Lisa Has Been Stolen	Michel Deville	George Chakiris, Marina Vlady	Comedy	French-Italian co-production
Mondo pazzo... gente matta!	Renato Polselli	Alberto Bonucci, Silvana Pampanini	Musical	
Monnaie de singe	Yves Robert	Robert Hirsch, Sylva Koscina	Comedy	French-Italian co-production
The Murder Clinic	Lionello De Felice, Elio Scardamaglia	William Berger, Françoise Prévost, Mary Young	Horror	Italian-French co-production
The Murderer with the Silk Scarf	Adrian Hoven	Carl Mohner, Folco Lulli	Crime	German-Italian co-production
Musica Popular Brasileira	Gianni Amico		Documentary	
Mutiny at Fort Sharp	Fernando Cerchio	Broderick Crawford, Elisa Montes, Mario Valdemarin	Western	Italian-Spanish co-production
Mutiny in outer space	Hugo Grimaldi	William Leslie	Science-fiction	American-Italian co-production
Navajo Joe	Sergio Corbucci	Burt Reynolds, Aldo Sambrell, Fernando Rey	Western	Italian-Spanish co-production
Nessuno mi può giudicare	Ettore Maria Fizzarotti	Catherina Caselli, Laura Efrikian	Musical	
New York chiama Superdrago	Giorgio Ferroni	Ray Danton, Marisa Mell	Spy film	French-Italian-German co-production
Non faccio la guerra, faccio l'amore	Franco Rossi	Catherine Spaak, Philippe Leroy	Comedy	Spanish-Italian co-production
Non si uccidono i poveri diavoli	Mario Landi	Gino Cervi, Irene Aloisi	Mystery	TV play (Le inchieste del commissario Maigret)
Nora seconda	Claudio Fino	Lidia Ferro, Emma Danieli	Drama	TV play
Nuestro agente en Casablanca	Tulio Demicheli	Lang Jeffries	Spy film	Spanish-Italian co-production
Objectif: 500 millions	Pierre Schoendoerffer	Bruno Cremer, Jean-Claude Rolland	Crime	French-Italian co-production
Oblomov	Claudio Fino	Alberto Lionello, Nando Gazzolo	Drama	TV serial
L'ombrellone	Dino Risi	Sandra Milo, Enrico Maria Salerno	Comedy	
Operation Counterspy	Nick Nostro	Giorgio Ardisson	Spy film	italian-French-Spanish co-production
Operazione San Gennaro	Dino Risi	Nino Manfredi, Senta Berger, Totò	Comedy	Italian-French-Westt German co-production
Pane bianco	Claudio Fino	Salvo Randone, Carlo D'Angelo	Drama	TV play
Paola	Gianni Amico	Maria Virginia Onorato	Drama	Short
Password: Uccidete agente Gordon	Sergio Grieco	Roger Browne	Spy film	Spanish-Italian co-production
Per Firenze	Franco Zeffirelli	Narrated by Richard Burton	Documentary	
Per il gusto di uccidere	Tonino Valerii	Craig Hill, George Martin, Piero Lulli	Western	Italian-Spanish co-production
Perdono	Ettore Maria Fizzarotti	Catherina Caselli, Laura Efrikian	Musical	
Perry Grant, agente di ferro	Luigi Capuano	Peter Holden	Spy film	
Premio Nobel	Gianfranco Bettettini	Sergio Tofano	Comedy	TV play
Quando la pelle brucia	Renato Dall'Ara	Bruno Cattaneo, Olga Soldelli	Drama	
Querido profesor	Javier Setò	Marcia Bell, Tomas Blanco	Musical	Spanish-italian co-production
A Question of Honour	Luigi Zampa	Ugo Tognazzi, Nicoletta Machiavelli, Bernard Blier	Comedy	
Quinta colonna	Vittorio Cottafavi	Raoul Grassilli, Giulia Lazzarini	Thriller	TV serial
Ramon the Mexican	Mauizio Pradeaux	Claudio Undari, Wilma Lindamar, Franco Gula	Western	
Rapporto segreto	Camillo Bazzoni	Pier Paolo Capponi	Drama	Short
Ray Master l'inafferrabile	Vittorio Sala	Felix Marten	Adventure	
Rebels on the Loose	Bruno Corbucci	Lando Buzzanca, Raimondo Vianello, Maria Martinez	Western	Italian-Spanish co-production
Renegade Gunfighter	Silvio Amadio	Zachary Hatcher, Anna Maria Pierangeli, Mimmo Palmara	Western	Italian-Spanish co-production
Requiem per un agente segreto	Sergio Sollima	Stewart Granger, Daniela Bianchi	Spy film	Italian-Spanish-West German co-production
Resistere a Roma	Giuseppe Ferrara		Documentary	
Rififi in Amsterdam	Sergio Grieco	Roger Browne	Adventure	Spanish-Italian co-production
Ringo and His Golden Pistol	Sergio Corbucci	Mark Damon, Valeria Fabrizi, Franco De Rosa	Western	
Ringo, the Mark of Vengeance	Mario Caiano	Anthony Steffen, Frank Wolff, Eduardo Fajardo	Western	Spanish-Italian co-production
Ringo's Big Night	Mario Maffei	William Berger, Eduardo Fajardo, Adriana Ambesi	Western	Italian-Spanish co-production
Rita la zanzara	Lina Wertmuller	Rita Pavone, Giancarlo Giannini	Musical	
Río maldito	Juan Xiol Marchal	Gerard Landry	Western	Spanish-Italian co-production
Rivoluzione a Cuba	Riccardo Malaspina		Documentary	Local distribution
A rose for everyone	Franco Rossi	Claudia Cardinale, Nino Manfredi	Comedy	
Una rosa per Angelica	Steno	Raffaella Carrà, Jacques Perrin	Historical	
Ruthless Colt of the Gringo	José Luis Madrid	Luigi Giuliani, Marta Padovan, German Monteverdi	Western	Italian-Spanish co-production
Savage Gringo	Antonio Roman	Ken Clark, Yvonne Bastien, Piero Lulli	Western	Italian-Spanish co-production
Seasons of Our Love	Florestano Vancini	Enrico Maria Salerno, Anouk Aimée, Jacqueline Sassard	Drama	
Scusi, lei è favorevole o contrario?	Alberto Sordi	Alberto Sordi, Giulietta Masina, Paola Pitagora	Comedy	
Se tutte le donne del mondo	Henry Levin, Arduino Maiuri	Mike Connors	Spy film	
The Second Twin	Christian-Jaque	Michèle Mercier, Robert Hossein, Pascale de Boysson	Thriller	Co-production with France
Se non son matti non li vogliamo	Carlo Lodovici	Cesco Baseggio, Sergio Tofano	Drama	TV play
Sept hommes et une garce	Bernard Borderie	Jean Marais, Marilù Tolo	Historical	French-Italian-Romanian co-production
Seven Golden Men Strike Again	Marco Vicario	Philippe Leroy, Rossana Podestà, Enrico Maria Salerno	Crime comedy	
Seven Golden Women Against Two 07	Vincenzo Cascino	Mickey Hargitay	Detective comedy	
Sette magnifiche pistole	Romolo Guerrieri	Ida Galli, Sean Flynn	Western	
Sette monaci d'oro	Marino Girolami	Raimondo Vianello, Aldo Fabrizi	Comedy	
Seven Guns for the MacGregors	Franco Giraldi	Roberto Woods, Manolo Zarzo, Fernando Sancho	Western	Italian–Spanish co-production
Seven Guns for Timothy	Romolo Guerrieri	Sean Flynn, Fernando Sancho, Ida Galli	Western	Italian–Spanish co-production
Seven Dollars to Kill	Alberto Cardone	Anthony Steffen, Fernando Sancho, Loredana Nusciak	Western	Italian–Spanish co-production
The she-beast	Michael Reeves	Barbara Steele, John Karlsen	Horror	English-Italian.jugoslavian co-production
Sicario 77, vivo o morto	Mino Guerrini	Robert Mark	Spy film	
Signore & signori	Pietro Germi	Alberto Lionello, Gastone Moschin, Virna Lisi	Comedy	
The Sons of Ringo	Giorgio Simonelli, Giuliano Carnimeo	Franco and Ciccio, George Hilton	Western	
Spara forte, più forte, non capisco	Eduardo De Filippo	Marcello Mastroianni, Raquel Welch	Comedy	
Special Code: Assignment Lost Formula	Pino Mercanti	Lang Jeffries	Spy film	Italian-Spanish-French co-production
Special Mission Lady Chaplin	Sergio Grieco, Alberto de Martino	Terence Hathaway	—N/a	Italian-French co-production
Spiaggia libera	Marino Girolami	Alberto Lupo, Aldo Giuffrè	Comedy	
The Spy with Ten Faces	Alberto De Martino	Paul Hubschmid, Karin Dor. Vivi Bach		West German–Italian co-production
Starback	Giovanni Grimaldi	Robert Woods	Western	Italian-German co-production
Star Pilot	Pietro Francisci	Leonora Ruffo, Anthony Freeman	Science fiction	
La strega in amore	Damiano Damiani	Rosanna Schiaffino, Richard Johnson, Sarah Ferrati	—N/a	
Sugar Colt	Franco Giraldi	Hunt Powers, Soledad Miranda, Giuliano Raffaelli	Western	Italian-Spanish co-production
Suicide Mission to Singapore	Ferdinando Baldi	Stelio Candelli, Annabella Incontrera	Action	
The sultans	Jean Delanniy	Louis Jourdan, Gina Lollobrigida	Drama	French-Italian co-production
Superargo contro Diabolikus	Nicola Nostro	Giovanni Cianfriglia, Gérard Tichy, Loredana Nusciak	—N/a	Italian–Spanish co-production
Supercolpo da 7 miliardi	Bitto Albertini	Brad Harris	Adventure	
Surcouf, l'eroe dei sette mari	Sergio Bergonzelli	Gerard Barray, Antonella Lualdi	Historical	Italian-French-Spanish co-production
Svegliati e uccidi	Carlo Lizzani	Robert Hoffmann, Lisa Gastoni	Crime	
The Tall Women	Sidney Pink	Anne Baxter, Maria Perschy, Gustavo Rojo	Western	Italian–Spanish–Austrian co-production
Target for Killing	Manfred R. Köhler	Stewart Granger, Karin Dor	Crime	Austrian-Italian co-production
Te lo leggo negli occhi	Camillo Mastrocinque	Agnes Spaak, Dino	Musical	
Tecnica di un omicidio	Franco Prosperi	Robert Webber, Franco Nero	Crime	Italian-French co-production
Tecnica di una spia	Alberto Leonardi	Tony Russel, Erika Blanc	Spy film	Italian-Spanish co-production
Tendre scoundrel	Jean Becker	Jean-Paul Belmondo, Stefania Sandrelli	Comedy	French-Italian co-production
Testa di rapa	Giancarlo Zagni	Folco Lulli, Gigliola Cinquetti	For children	
Texas Adios	Ferdinando Baldi	Franco Nero, Jose Suarez, Alberto Dell Acqua	Western	Italian–Spanish co-production
The Forbidden	Benjamin Andrews, Lee Frost		Mondo movie	American-Italian co-production
The One Eyed Soldiers	John Answorth	Dale Robertson, Luciana Paluzzi	Crime	British-Yugoslavian-Italian co-production
That Man George	Jacques Deray	George Hamilton, Claudine Auger	Spy film	French-Italian co-production
The Third Eye	Mino Guerrini	Franco Nero, Gioia Pascal, Erika Blanc	Horror	
Thompson 1880	Guido Zurli	George Martin, Gia Sandri, Paul Muller	Western	Italian-Spanish co-production
Three Graves for a Winchester	Emimmo Salvi	Gordon Mitchell, Mickey Hargitay, Milla Sannoner	Western	
To Skin a Spy	Jacques Deray	Lino Ventura	Spy Film	French-Italian co-production
Tovarich	Flaminio Bollini	Rossella Falk, Sergio Fantoni	Comedy	
Tramonto	Italo Alfaro	Cesco Baseggio, Wanda Capodaglio	Drama	TV play
Trampoli	Claudio Fino	Liana Orfei, Giancarlo Sbragia	Comedy	TV play
Trap for Seven Spies	Mario Amendola	Eduardo Fajardo, Yvonne Bastien Mirko Ellis	Spy film	
Trap for the Assassin	Riccardo Freda	Georges Géret, Irene Papas, Jean-Pierre Marielle	—N/a	French–Italian co-production
Tre franchi di pietà	Luigi Batzella	Josef Constantin	Drama	
Tre notti violente	Nick Nostro	Brett Halsey, Julio Pena	Crime	Spanish-Italian co-production
Tre pistole contro Cesare	Enzo Peri	Thomas Hunter, James Shigeta	Western	Italian-Algerian co-production
Treasure of San Gennaro	Dino Risi	Nino Manfredi, Senta Berger, Totò	Comedy	
Two Thousand Dollars for Coyote	Leon Kimvwsky	James Philbrook	Western	Spanish-Italian co-production
Uccideva a freddo	Guido Celano	Dan Harrison, Philippe Marsch	Western	
Umberto Saba e gli umani animali	Andrea Frezza		Documentary	
Un brivido sulla pelle	Amasi Damiani	Femi Benussi, Gianni Medici	Spy film	
Un choix d'assassins	Philippe Fourastié,	Bernard Noel, Guido Alberti	Crime	French-Italian co-production
Un colpo da mille miliardi	Paolo Heusch	Rik Van Nutter	Action	Italian-Spanish-French co-production
Un colpo da re	Angelo Dorigo	Alan Steel	Comedy	
Un dólar de fuego	Nick Nostro	Miguel de la Riva	Western	
Un gangster venuto da Brooklyn	Emimmo Salvi	Akim Tamiroff	Comedy	
Un milione di dollari per sette assassini	Umberto Lenzi	Roger Browne	Crime	
Un monde nouveau	Vittorio De Sica	Christine Delaroche, Nino Castelnuovo	Drama	French-Italian co-production
Un pizzico di pietà	Anton Giulio Majano	Mario Feliciani, Anna Miserocchi	Drama	TV play
Un uomo a metà	Vittorio De Seta	Jacques Perrin, Lea Padovani	Drama	Italian-French co-production
Una Cenerentola alla moda	Italo Alfaro	Wanda Guida, Carlo Giuffré	Comedy	TV play
Una questione privata	Giorgio Trentin	Nino Segurini, Valeria Ciangottini	Drama	
Una rete piena di sabbia	Elio Ruffo	Cyrus Elias	Drama	
Una ráfaga de plomo	Paolo Heusch, Antonio Santilan	Robert Hoffmann, Marilù Tolo	Adventure	Italian-Spanish-Egyptian co-production
Uno sceriffo tutto d'oro	Osvaldo Civirani	Jacques Berthier	Western	
The Ugly Ones	Eugenio Martin	Tomas Milian, Richard Wyler, Ella Karin	Western	Spanish–Italian co-production
The Upper Hand	Denys de La Patellière	Jean Gabin, George Raft, Gert Fröbe	Crime	French–Italian co-production
Vacanze sulla neve	Filippo Walter Ratti	Valeria Fabrizi	Comedy	
Veneri in collegio	Marino Girolami	Raimondo Vianello, Sandra Mondaini	Comedy	Italian-spanish co-production
Vergine per un bastardo	Ubaldo Ragona	Marisa Solinas	Drama	
Vertu	Alessandro Brissoni	Gabriele Ferzetti, Marcherita Guzzinati	Drama	TV play
Viaggio di nozze all'italiana	Mario Amendola	Toni Ucci, Ferruccio Amendola	Comedy	
Wild, Wild Planet	Antonio Margheriti	Tony Russel, Lisa Gastoni, Massimo Serato	Science fiction	
Winnetou and the Crossbreed	Harald Philipp	Lex Barker, Pierre Brice	Western	German-Italian-French co-production
Witchdoctor in Tails	Paolo Cavara	Georg Sanders	Mondo film	
A Woman for Ringo	Rafael Romero Marchent	Sean Flynn, Pilar Bayona, Emilia Bayona	Western	Italian–Spanish co-production
Yankee	Tinto Brass	Philippe Leroy, Adolfo Celi	Western	Italian–Spanish co-production
Your Money or Your Life	Jean-Pierre Mocky.	Fernandel, Jean Poiret	Comedy	French-Italian-German co-production
Z2 Operazione Circeo	Alberto Cavallone	Luciano Rossi	Musicarello	Television film
Z7 Operation Rembrandt	Giancarlo Romitelli	Lang Jeffries	Spy film	German-Italian-Spanish co-production
Zorro the Rebel	Piero Pierotti	Howard Ross, Gabriella Andreini, Silvio Bagolini	Western	

== Citations ==
- Bell, Melanie; Williams, Melanie (2009). British Women's Cinema. Routledge. ISBN 978-1135231934.
- Balio, Tino (2010). The Foreign Film Renaissance on American Screens, 1946–1973. University of Wisconsin Press. ISBN 978-0299247935.
- Curti, Roberto (2013). Italian Crime Filmography. McFarland. ISBN 978-0786469765.
- Curti, Roberto (2015). Italian Gothic Horror Films, 1957-1969. McFarland. ISBN 978-1476619897.
- Curti, Roberto (2016a). Tonino Valerii: The Films. McFarland Publishing. ISBN 978-1476626185.
- Curti, Roberto (2016b). Diabolika: Supercriminals, Superheroes and the Comic Book Universe in Italian Cinema. Midnight Marquee Press. ISBN 978-1-936168-60-6.
- Curti, Roberto (2017). Riccardo Freda: The Life and Works of a Born Filmmaker. McFarland. ISBN 978-1476628387.
- Curti, Roberto (2018). Mavericks of Italian Cinema: Eight Unorthodox Filmmakers, 1940s-2000s. McFarland. ISBN 978-1476672427.
- Grant, Kevin (2011). Any Gun Can Play. Fab Press. ISBN 9781903254615.
- Howarth, Troy (2015). Splintered Visions: Lucio Fulci and His Films. Midnight Marquee Press, Inc. ISBN 978-1936168538.
- Hughes, Howard (2004). Once Upon a Time in the Italian West. I. B. Tauris. ISBN 1-85043-430-1.
- Kinnard, Roy; Crnkovich, Tony (2017). Italian Sword and Sandal Films, 1908–1990. McFarland. ISBN 978-1476662916.
