= Tony Russel =

American actor (1925–2017)

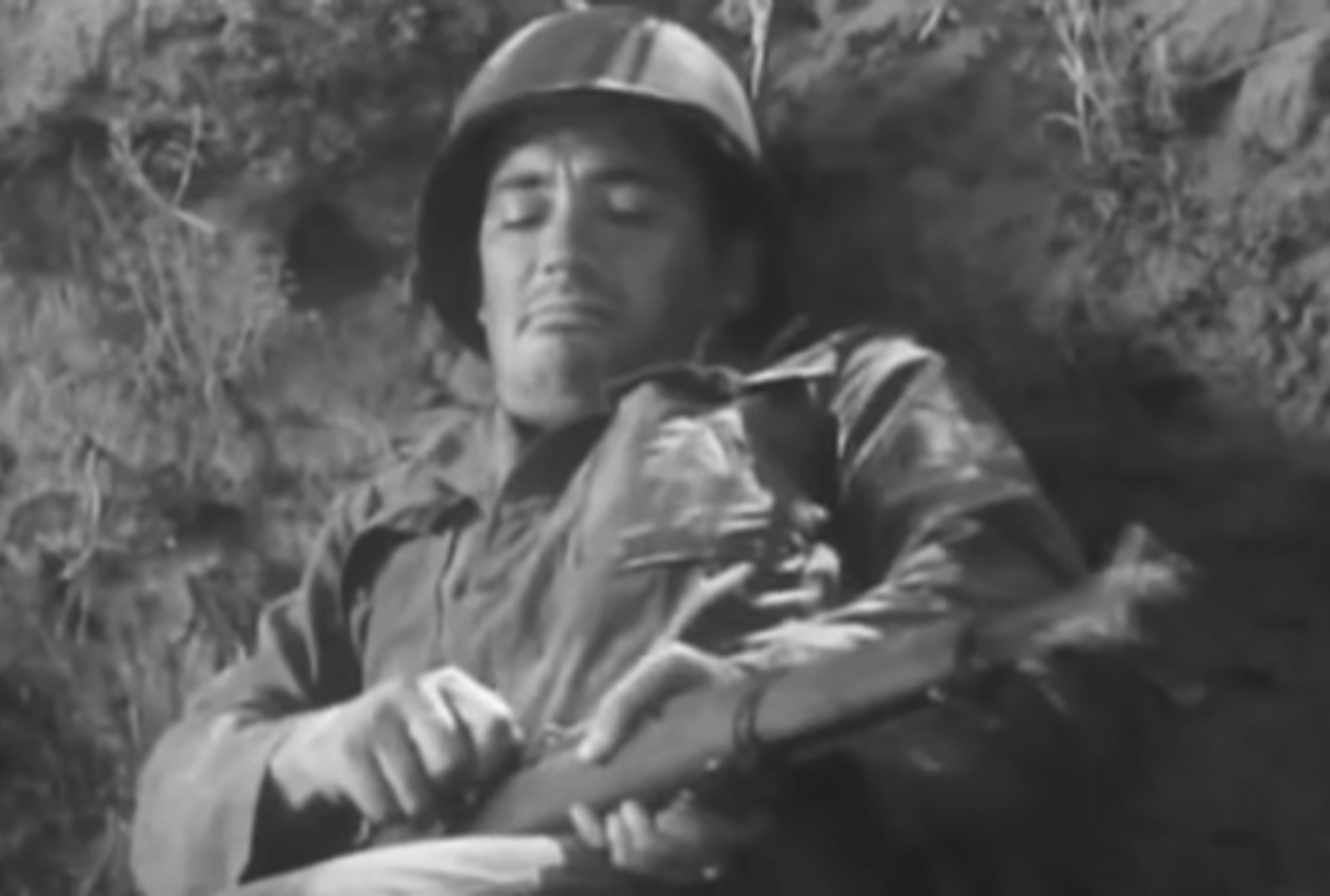
- Russel in War Is Hell (1961)
- Born: Antonio Pietro Russo; November 23, 1925; Kenosha, Wisconsin, U.S.
- Died: March 18, 2017 (aged 91); Las Vegas, Nevada, U.S.
- Resting place: Southern Nevada Veterans Memorial Cemetery, Boulder City, Nevada, U.S.
- Occupation: Actor
- Years active: 1952–1992
- Spouses: Jodean Lawrence (m. 1951; div. 1974); Sascha Corwin (m. 1985–2017)
- Children: 1

Tony Russel (born Antonio Pietro Russo, and sometimes credited as Tony Russo or Tony Russell; November 23, 1925 – March 18, 2017) was an American actor. He was noted for having worked extensively in the Italian film industry in the mid-1960s, and for his work as a voice actor where he was the founder and president of the English Language Dubbers Association (ELDA) in Italy. He was one of several American actors who turned down the lead of A Fistful of Dollars.

== Biography ==
Born in Kenosha, Wisconsin, from Italian immigrants, Russel served in the United States Army Air Forces during World War II. He then studied at University of Wisconsin–Madison.

Russel founded the English Languages Dubbers Association of Rome (ELDA) in 1954, providing dubbing services for films and becoming the leading English dubbing group in Europe. He was responsible for uniting all of the rival organizations operating in the city, and served as president until 1966, when he was succeeded by Roger Browne.

After making Burt Topper's War is Hell (1963), he went to Italy first appearing in the title role of La leggenda di Fra Diavolo. He then appeared in several sword and sandal and Eurospy films, including Secret of the Sphinx (1964) and Gladiators Seven (1964). Russel played Zorro in Behind the Mask of Zorro (1965); he had originally tested for the role of Walt Disney's Zorro but lost out to Guy Williams. Among Russel's starring roles are parts in the sci-fi epics Wild, Wild Planet (1965) and its sequel, War of the Planets filmed concurrently.

He left Italy for America in 1967, and later appeared in such films as The Hard Ride (1971) and Soul Hustler (1973).

He died on March 18, 2017, in Las Vegas, Nevada, aged 91, and is buried in Southern Nevada Veterans Memorial Cemetery under his birth name, Antonio P. Russo.

== Filmography ==
Year	Film	Role	Notes
1952	Hiawatha		Uncredited role. Directed by Kurt Neumann.
1954	The Silver Chalice	Sicarii	Uncredited role. Directed by Victor Saville
1955	Jump into Hell	Radio Operator	Uncredited role. Directed by David Butler
1955	Highway Patrol	Jimmy Wilson	Season 1, Episode 11: "Retired Gangster", directed by Alvin Ganzer.
1956	Anything Goes	French Sailor	Uncredited role. Directed by Robert Lewis.
1958	King Creole	Chico	Uncredited role. Directed by Michael Curtiz.
1959	Don't Give Up the Ship	Lieutenant (s.g.)	Uncredited role. Directed by Normal Taurog.
1959	Last Train from Gun Hill	Pinto	Uncredited role. Directed by John Sturges.
1961	War Is Hell	Sgt. Keefer	Directed by Burt Topper.
1962	La leggenda di Fra Diavolo	Fra Diavolo	Directed by Leopoldo Savona.
1963	Il terrore dei mantelli rossi	Paolo	Directed by Mario Costa.
1963	Gli invincibili sette	Leslio	Directed by Alberto De Martino.
1964	The Thief of Damascus	Jesen	Directed by Mario Amendola.
1964	L'ultima carica	Rocco Vardarelli	Directed by Leopoldo Savona.
1964	Gladiators Seven	Keros	Directed by Alberto De Martino.
1964	Hercules Against the Moon Men	Tirteo	Voice of the English version. Directed by Giacomo Gentilomo.
1964	Secret of the Sphinx	Thomas	Directed by Duccio Tessari.
1965	Behind the Mask of Zorro	Patriciao / Alfonso / Zorro	Directed by Ricardo Blasco.
1965	Three Weeks of Love	Bud	Directed by William E. Brusseau.
1966	Wild, Wild Planet	Cmdr. Mike Halstead	Directed by Antonio Margheriti.
1966	War of the Planets	Cmdr. Mike Halstead	Directed by Antonio Margheriti.
1966	Target Goldseven	Alan Milner	Directed by Alberto Leonardi.
1966	Honeymoon, Italian Style	Barone Frescobaldi	Directed by Mario Amendola.
1971	The Hard Ride	Big Red	Directed by Burt Topper.
1973	Un ufficiale non si arrende mai nemmeno di fronte all'evidenza, firmato Colonello Buttiglione		Directed by Mino Guerrini.
1973	Soul Hustler	Evin Calder	Directed by Burt Topper.
1984	The Vegas Strip War	Morgan Steinman	TV movie directed by George Englund.
