= Behind the Mask of Zorro =

1965 Italian western film directed by Ricardo Blasco

E Zorro cabalga otra vez
- Directed by: Ricardo Blasco
- Starring: José Gallardo
- Release date: 1965
- Countries: Italy; Spain
- Language: Italian

Behind the Mask of Zorro (aka E Zorro cabalga otra vez/ Zorro Rides Again), is a 1965 Italian western film directed by Ricardo Blasco. Tony Russel plays Zorro.

== Cast ==
- Tony Russel ... Patricio / Alfonso / Zorro
- María José Alfonso ... Manuela
- Roberto Paoletti (as Robert Paoletti)
- Jesús Puente ... General Esteban Garcia
- Mirella Maravidi ... Alicia
- Pepe Rubio ... Marcel (as José Rubio)
- Ángela Rhu
- Agustín González ... Captain
- Sancho Gracia ... Juan (as Félix Sancho Gracia)
- Enrique Navarro
- María Gónzales
- Rafael Corés
- Enrico Salvatore
- Aldo Cecconi
- Joaquín Pamplona
