= The Strangler =

1964 film by Burt Topper

- Directed by: Burt Topper
- Written by: Bill S. Ballinger
- Produced by: Samuel Bischoff; David Diamond
- Starring: Victor Buono; David McLean; Davey Davison; Ellen Corby; Jeanne Bates
- Cinematography: Jacques R. Marquette
- Edited by: Robert S. Eisen
- Music by: Marlin Skiles
- Production company: Bischoff-Diamond Corporation
- Distributed by: Allied Artists
- Release date: April 8, 1964
- Running time: 89 minutes
- Country: United States

The Strangler is a 1964 American psychological thriller film directed by Burt Topper and starring Victor Buono, David McLean, Davey Davison, and Ellen Corby, with a screenplay by Bill S. Ballinger. It follows a disturbed lab technician who embarks on a serial killing spree of young female victims. The film was inspired by the Boston Strangler, a serial killer who murdered several women in the 1960s, and went into production while police were still attempting to solve the crimes.

== Plot ==
Leo Kroll is a mother-fixated lab technician who collects dolls. He is also a serial killer, responsible for the death of a number of nurses, and is questioned by the police regarding those murders, but is released. Kroll claims his next victim, Clara, the nurse who has been looking after his possessive mother, who is in hospital after a heart attack. However, he leaves a doll behind at the murder scene. (A subplot features Kroll becoming enamored of Tally, one of the girls who works at the amusement park stall from which he won this doll.)

Kroll is again questioned by the police, but successfully passes a lie detector test and is released. He visits his mother in hospital and tells her how he killed Clara, which induces a second, fatal heart attack. Returning to the amusement park, he sees Barbara, Tally's co-worker, talking to the police. This makes Kroll frantic. As Kroll is talking to Barbara about the police, he is visibly nervous. He misses ring after ring while he plays the game. When Barbara mimics one of the dolls by saying "Mama", this reminds Kroll of his mother and finally sets him off. Kroll goes to Barbara's apartment and strangles her as she is stepping out of the shower. The killing of a girl that works at an amusement park stand and not a nurse throws the police off.

Meanwhile, it seems with his mother dead, Kroll finally feels free and it seems his hatred for women is fading. He visits Tally and proposes to her. After he is rejected, Kroll begins to believe in his mind that all the bad things his mother told him about women are true. After questioning Tally and getting a description, the police finally find their strangler. Kroll hides in Tally's apartment and waits to kill her when she comes home. The police, believing Tally could be the strangler's next victim, bug her room and stay close by to catch Kroll. Tally is packing her bag to leave town and ends up covering the bug in her room. The police are unable to hear what is going on when Kroll comes out and begins to strangle Tally. The police burst into the room and open fire. Kroll is hit, goes through the window, and plunges to his death; it is unclear if Tally has survived.

== Cast ==
- Victor Buono as Leo Kroll
- David McLean as Lt. Frank Benson
- Diane Sayer as Barbara Wells
- Davey Davison as Tally Raymond
- Baynes Barron as Sgt. Mack Clyde
- Ellen Corby as Mrs. Kroll
- Michael Ryan as Detective Mel Posner
- Russ Bender as Dr. Clarence Sanford
- Jeanne Bates as Clara Thomas, the Nurse
- Wally Campo as Eggerton
- Mimi Dillard as Thelma
- Byron Morrow as Dr. Morton
- John Yates as Intern
- James Sikking as Police Sketch Artist
- Robert Cranford as Jack Rosten

== Production ==
=== Development ===
Producers Samuel Bischoff and David Diamond originally planned to make a movie called The Boston Strangler, capitalizing on the ongoing interest in the real life serial killer of the same name. The setting was later changed to an unnamed US city. Burt Topper was hired in the wake of his work on War Is Hell (1963) and production commenced mid-September 1963.

Topper found working with Bischoff and Diamond a positive experience, but relations were not as smooth with his star, Victor Buono. Buono insisted the director change those scenes which he felt were "too suggestive" (indeed, cinematographer Jacques Marquette's main recollection of the shoot was Buono's refusal to do a scene in which Diane Sayer was supposed to be nude) and he once walked off set for a day, after an exchange with Topper over the actor's difficulty hitting his marks.

=== Casting ===
The film's small budget limited the number of big names that could be hired, and the main leads were subject to Allied Artists' approval. Victor Buono, who had recently received an Academy Award nomination for his role in What Ever Happened to Baby Jane?, was cast as serial killer Leo Kroll independently of director Burt Topper, who chose David McLean for the role of Lt. Frank Benson. McLean was known for his lead role in the 1960 Western television series Tate.

Veteran character actress Ellen Corby (later to become best known as Grandma Walton in The Waltons) played Mrs. Kroll, and Jeanne Bates was Clara Thomas, her attending nurse.

Among the unknowns cast were Davey Davison as Tally Raymond, and Diane Sayer as Barbara Wells, Tally's colleague at the amusement park stand from which Kroll obtains a doll. Topper also drew on the "Burt Topper Stock Company" – an unofficial group of actors he worked with regularly – to fill some supporting roles, including Baynes Barron, Russ Bender and Wally Campo.

== Release ==
The Strangler premiered in Boston on April 8, 1964, before opening in San Francisco on May 1, 1964.

=== Critical response ===
The Time Out Film Guide describes the film as a "compelling tawdry exploiter", acknowledging its stars' contributions. Likewise, David Sindelar of movie website Fantastic Movie Musings & Ramblings cites Buono as one of the film's strengths, though criticizing the script's focus on the more logically motivated murders.

Among contemporaneous reviews, Variety commended both Buono's performance and Topper's "dramatically skillful direction" while The New York Times film critic Eugene Archer seemed unimpressed.

=== Home media ===
The Strangler was released on manufactured-on-demand (MOD) DVD by the Warner Archive Collection on November 10, 2015. Scream Factory released the film for the first time on Blu-ray on June 6, 2023.

== Sources ==
- Krafsur, Richard P., ed. (1997). The American Film Institute Catalog of Motion Pictures Produced in the United States, Volume 1, Part 2. Berkeley, California: University of California Press. ISBN 978-0-520-20970-1.
- Weaver, Tom (2003). "Jacques Marquette". Double Feature Creature Attack: A Monster Merger of Two More Volumes of Classic Interviews. McFarland Classics Series. Jefferson, North Carolina: McFarland. ISBN 978-0-7864-1366-9.
- Weaver, Tom (2005). "Burt Topper on The Strangler". Earth vs. the Sci-Fi Filmmakers: 20 Interviews. Jefferson, North Carolina: McFarland. ISBN 978-0-7864-2210-4.
