= Foxbat (film) =

1977 Hong Kong film by Po-Chih Leong

- DVD cover
- Directed by: Po-Chih Leong
- Screenplay by: Les Roberts; Terence Young
- Story by: Philip Chan; Po-Chih Leong
- Produced by: Chi-Ming Yip
- Starring: Henry Silva; Vonetta McGee; Rik Van Nutter; Roy Chiao
- Cinematography: Tony Hope
- Edited by: Raymond Poulton
- Music by: Roy Budd
- Production company: Bang Bang Film Productions
- Distributed by: Golden Harvest
- Release date: 15 December 1977
- Running time: 107 minutes
- Country: Hong Kong
- Language: English

Foxbat (Chinese: 狐蝠; pinyin: Hú Fú; Jyutping: wu4 fuk1; lit. 'flying fox') is a 1977 action spy film directed by Po-Chih Leong, co-written by Terence Young, and starring Henry Silva, Vonetta McGee, Rik Van Nutter, and Roy Chiao. It is based on an original story by Philip Chan and Leong, and is based on the circumstances surrounding the defection of Soviet Air Force pilot Viktor Belenko and the capture of the MiG-25 "Foxbat" fighter.

It was the first English-language production for the Hong Kong–based Leong. English filmmaker Young made some contributions to the script, which led to him being advertised as a co-director in many countries, though he was not involved in the actual shooting of the film. Despite being targeted at the American market, it was not released in the United States theatrically, and was eventually aired on CBS under the title Operation Foxbat.

== Plot ==
An international race is being waged to obtain the blueprints of a MiG-25 Foxbat Soviet fighter plane that has landed in Japan. Michael Saxon, an undercover U.S. spy, has secretly taken photos of the aircraft, and now he faces overwhelming odds to transport the microfilm back to his home country. While Saxon bides time in Hong Kong, Chinese cook Cheung accidentally swallows the microfilm, and unwittingly becomes a target as well.

== Cast ==
- Henry Silva as Michael Saxon
- Vonetta McGee as Toni Hill
- Rik Van Nutter as Crays
- James Yi Lui as Cheung
- Roy Chiao as Vod
- Gigo Tevzadze as Mr. Lamont
- Philip Chan as Lee
- Melvin Wong as Victor
- Hung Wong as Musad
- Fred Marshall as Dahlbeck
- Nick Lam Wai Kei as Boris
- Chin-tai Tse as Sung
- Mei-te Tan as Mrs. Lamont
- Chung-hsin Tang as Chow
- Yuen Wah as Feng

== Production ==
Terence Young contributed to the screenplay for the film, which led to him being credited as co-director in some regions.

== Release ==
The film was initially released in Hong Kong under the title Woo fook on 15 December 1977. While not receiving a US theatrical release, it was subsequently broadcast on CBS television.

== See also ==
- List of Hong Kong films of 1977
