= Soul Hustler =

- Film poster
- Directed by: Burt Topper
- Written by: Burt Topper
- Produced by: Burt Topper
- Starring: Fabian Forte; Nai Bonet; Tony Russel; Casey Kasem; Larry Bishop
- Cinematography: Alan Stevenson
- Edited by: Kenneth Crane
- Music by: Harley Hatcher
- Production company: Burt Topper Productions
- Distributed by: American Films Ltd
- Release date: February 20, 1973 (United States)
- Running time: 81 mins
- Country: United States
- Language: English

Soul Hustler, also known as The Day the Lord Got Busted, is a 1973 American feature film starring Fabian as a preacher.

== Plot ==
Singer Matthew Crowe (Fabian Forte) teams up with a tent show preacher (Tony Russel) who uses him as part of his touring show. Matthew lands a record deal and the preacher becomes his manager. They hire a group of musicians and become very successful. However, his new fortune increases his dependence on drugs, and his off-stage carousing threatens his career.

== Production ==
The film was shot in San Diego in 1971.

During production the film used the title That Lovin' Man Jesus and later The Love-In Man. It was also known as Matthew. Fabian filmed part of the picture at an Osmonds Concert at LA Forum – it was his first public singing performance in ten years.

== Release ==
The film was released theatrically in the south but was a commercial disappointment.
