= Francesco Morlacchi =

Italian composer

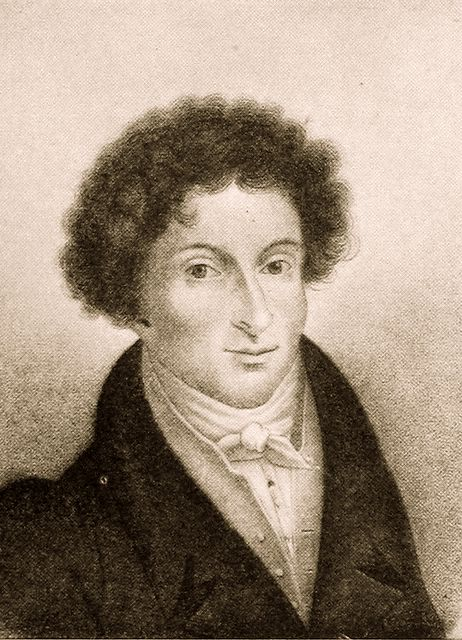
- Morlacchi, stipple engraving by Luigi Rados
- Born: 14 June 1784; Perugia, Italy
- Died: 20 October 1841 (aged 57); Innsbruck, Austria-Hungary
- Occupation: Composer
- Organizations: Dresden Court Opera

Francesco Giuseppe Baldassare Morlacchi (14 June 1784 – 28 October 1841) was an Italian composer of more than twenty operas. During the many years he spent as the royal Royal Kapellmeister in Dresden, he was instrumental in popularizing the Italian style of opera.

== Biography ==
Born in Perugia, Morlacchi was from a family of musicians. He composed from a very young age, first studying with his uncle Giovanni Mazzetti and later with Luigi Caruso in Perugia. He later studied at Loreto with Zingarelli (1803–4). Finally, he ended up in Bologna at the school of Stanislao Mattei (1805) where he met Gioacchino Rossini.

Morlacchi was quickly successful as an opera composer. His first operatic works were written in 1807, and were a farce and a comic opera. His first truly effective theatre work was the opera seria Corradino (Parma, 1808), and led to commissions from opera houses in Rome and Milan. In 1810 he was brought to Dresden by contralto Marietta Marcolini, and in 1811 Morlacchi was made Kapellmeister of the Italian Opera in Dresden. While in Dresden, he had to work to establish himself in the eyes of critics. By this time, German opera was well established, and Morlacchi and his compositions were seen to represent the old order both of composers and the aristocracy. In 1815 Morlacchi set Il barbiere di Siviglia with a libretto of Giuseppe Petrosellini and one year later Rossini presented his own with a newer libretto by Cesare Sterbini.

One of Morlacchi's most successful works was Tebaldo e Isolina (La Fenice, Venice, 1822). Giovanni Battista Velluti premiered the work, and made the role his own. The opera was performed in 40 cities over the next ten years, largely thanks to Velluti's skillful performance.

The architect Gottlob Friedrich Thormeyer painted his portrait in 1829.

Morlacchi died in Innsbruck.

== Works ==
- Oratorio - La passione di Gesù Cristo 1812, one of the last settings of Metastasio's libretto of 1730.

Although sometimes credited with it, Francesco Morlacchi did not compose "The Swiss Shepherd", ( "Il pastore svizzero" in Italian ). "The Swiss Shepherd" was instead written by Italian flautist Pietro Morlacchi (1828–1868).

== See also ==
- Morlacchi
