= Tharus Son of Attila =

- Directed by: Roberto Bianchi Montero
- Written by: Leo Bomba; Roberto Bianchi Montero
- Starring: Jerome Courtland; Lisa Gastoni
- Cinematography: Giuseppe La Torre
- Music by: Alexandre Derevitsky; Mario Migliardi
- Release date: 1962
- Country: Italy
- Language: Italian

Tharus Son of Attila (Italian: Tharus figlio di Attila), also known as Colossus and the Huns, is a 1962 Italian peplum film co-written and directed by Roberto Bianchi Montero and starring Jerome Courtland in the title role.

== Plot ==
The late Attila's brother, King Bohlem, regains former Hun territory. He orders his nephew Tharus and son Otto to establish an alliance with King Haadem, who is among the most powerful of the neighboring rulers, with the intent for the king to safeguard his land. However, Haadem is merely negotiating an alliance with Kudrum, the aspirational son of a king who is opposed to Hun interests. Whilst Tamall is not fond of Kudrum, Haadem agreed to marry his daughter to Kudrun in order to solidify their partnership. She falls in love with the newcomer Tharus immediately. Kudrum prepares for Tharus to get publicly punished in an effort to inflame Haadem's feelings against him. Unsatisfied, Kudrum kills Haadem and has Tharus accused of the crime. When Kudrum's forces approach for a pivotal fight, Tamall's love for Tharus is brought to the test, but she ultimately decides to believe Tharus's claims of innocence and acts on his behalf.

== Cast ==
- Jerome Courtland as Tharus
- Lisa Gastoni as Princess Gamal
- Mimmo Palmara as Gudrum
- Rik Van Nutter as Oto
- Livio Lorenzon as King Hatum
- Giuseppe Addobbati as King Bolem
