= Mario Migliardi =

Italian composer

Mario Migliardi (31 May 1919 – 8 August 2000) was an Italian composer of music for movies and television. He was born in Alessandria, Italy.

== Works ==
Migliardi composed music and soundtracks for the following movies and television shows:

- A come Andromeda (1972) (mini) TV Series
- The Price of Death (1971) a.k.a. Il Venditore di morte
- Shoot the Living and Pray for the Dead (1971)
- Matalo! (1970)
- Pensiero d'amore (1969)
- Turm der verbotenen Liebe, Der (1968) a.k.a. Tower of Screaming Virgins (USA)
- La sfinge sorride prima di morire - Stop Londra (1964) a.k.a. Secret of the Sphinx (USA)
- Chirurgo opera, Il (1964)
- Tharus figlio di Attila (1962) a.k.a. Colussus and the Huns (USA: TV title)
- Pianeta degli uomini spenti, Il (1961) a.k.a. Battle of the Worlds (USA: dubbed version)
