= Gladiators Seven =

- Directed by: Alberto De Martino
- Screenplay by: Sandro Continenza; Alberto De Martino; Vincenzo Mannino
- Produced by: Joseph Fryd
- Starring: Tony Russel; Massimo Serato; Nando Gazzolo; Livio Lorenzon
- Cinematography: Pier Ludovico Pavoni
- Edited by: Otello Colangeli
- Music by: Franco Mannino
- Production company: Sanson Film
- Distributed by: Metro-Goldwyn-Mayer
- Release date: 28 December 1964 (Italy)
- Running time: 90 minutes
- Country: Italy
- Language: English/Italian (captions available)

Gladiators Seven (Italian: La rivolta dei sette, also known as The Revolt of the Seven, The Spartan Gladiator and The Spartan Gladiators) is a 1964 Italian peplum film directed by Alberto De Martino and starring Tony Russel.

== Cast ==
- Tony Russel as Keros
- Massimo Serato as Baxo
- Nando Gazzolo as Milo
- Livio Lorenzon as Nemete
- Piero Lulli as Silone
- Howard Ross as Croto
- Pietro Capanna as Mardok
- Helga Liné as Aspasia
- Paola Piretti as Elea
- Nando Angelini as The Spying Gladiator
- Walter Maestosi as Criton
- Gaetano Quartararo as Head of the Gladiators
- Dakar

== Release ==
Gladiators Seven was released in Italy on 28 December 1964.
