= Istro-Romanian =

Istro-Romanian may refer to:

- Istro-Romanians
- Istro-Romanian language

== See also ==
- Morlachs (disambiguation)
