= Battle of the Commandos =

- Directed by: Umberto Lenzi
- Screenplay by: Eduardo Manzanos Brochero; Rolf Grieminger; Dario Argento
- Starring: Jack Palance; Thomas Hunter; Curd Jurgens; Wolfgang Preiss
- Cinematography: Alejandro Ulloa
- Edited by: Giese Rohm
- Music by: Piero Umiliani; Marcello Giombini
- Production companies: Tritone Filmindustria Roma S.r.l.; Eguiluz Films; Hape-Film GmbH
- Release dates: 12 August 1969 (Spain); 17 April 1970 (West Germany)
- Running time: 94 minutes
- Countries: Italy; Spain; West Germany

Battle of the Commandos (also known as Legion of the Damned) is a European Macaroni-War film directed in 1969 by Umberto Lenzi. The movie was a co-production between Italy (where it was released as La legione dei dannati), West Germany (where is known with the title Die zum Teufel gehen) and Spain (where it is known as La brigada de los condenados).

== Plot ==
In June 1944, the Allies initiate the liberation of Europe by landing in Normandy. The Germans have fortified the French coasts to resist the landing, but the exact location and day are unknown to them. Colonel Henderson, an English officer, is given a mission to form a commando unit and reach the French coasts near Le Havre, east of Normandy, to mislead the Germans about the landing location.

Colonel Ackerman, who had previously defeated Henderson's unit in North Africa, commands the German troops in that area. Upon reaching the beach, the commandos detonate underwater mines, neutralize bunkers, and face additional German forces, forcing them to retreat inland. Despite losing several members during pursuits, they successfully destroyed a massive rail-mounted cannon.

== Cast ==
- Jack Palance: Col. Charley MacPherson
- Curd Jürgens: Maj. Gen. von Reilow
- Thomas Hunter: Capt. Kevin Burke
- Robert Hundar: Pvt. Raymond Stone
- Wolfgang Preiss: Col. Ackerman
- Helmuth Schneider: Pvt. Sam Schrier
- Guido Lollobrigida: Pvt. Tom Carlyle
- Aldo Sambrell: Sgt. Karim Habinda
- Diana Lorys: Janine
- Franco Fantasia: Schiwers, the French Maquis leader
- Gérard Herter: Lt. Hapke
- Mirko Ellis: Capt. Adler
- Bruno Corazzari: Pvt. Frank Madigan

== Release ==
Battle of the Commandos was released in Spain on August 12, 1969 as La brigada de los condenados. It was released in West Germany on April 17, 1970 as Die zum Teufel gehen.
