= Morlachs (disambiguation) =

The Morlachs were a group of Vlachs in modern-day Croatia and Bosnia who were known under such name.

Morlach or similar terms might also refer to:

- Morlachia, a historical region in Europe inhabited by Morlachs in the past
- Morlachs (Venetian irregulars), a former Venetian irregular military group
- Morlachism, a literary movement that consisted on the interest in the Morlachs by European writers
- Morlacco, an Italian cheese named after the Morlachs

== See also ==
- Morlacchi, the Italian name of the Morlachs that may refer to an Italian surname or the Teatro Morlacchi at Perugia
- Istro-Romanian (disambiguation)
