= War of the Planets (1966 film) =

- Italian theatrical release poster
- Directed by: Antonio Margheriti
- Screenplay by: Renato Moretti; Ivan Reiner
- Produced by: Joseph Fryd; Antonio Margheriti
- Starring: Tony Russel; Lisa Gastoni; Franco Nero; Charles Justin; Enzo Fiermonte; Linda Sini
- Cinematography: Riccardo Pallottini
- Edited by: Otello Colangeli
- Music by: A.F. Lavagnino
- Production companies: Mercury Film International; Southern Cross Films
- Distributed by: Unidis (Italy); Metro-Goldwyn-Mayer (US)
- Release date: 4 June 1966; (Italy)
- Running time: 105 minutes
- Country: Italy
- Languages: Italian; English

War of the Planets (Italian: I Diafanoidi Vengono da Marte, lit. 'The Diaphanoids Come From Mars' is a 1966 Italian science fiction film, produced by Joseph Fryd and Antonio Margheriti, directed by Margheriti, that stars Tony Russel and Lisa Gastoni (Russel's name is misspelled in the opening credits as "Tony Russell"). The film was released theatrically in 1966 throughout Europe. Its storyline and screenplay were written by Ivan Reiner and Renato Moretti.

This is the second film in the Gamma-One series and follows Wild, Wild Planet (a.k.a. I Criminali della Galassia ("Criminals of the Galaxy")) and precedes War Between the Planets (a.k.a. Il Pianeta Errante ("Planet on the Prowl")) and Snow Devils (a.k.a. La Morte Viene dal Pianeta Aytin ("Death Comes From The Planet Aytin")).

== Plot ==
On New Year's Eve in the middle of the 21st century, space station Alpha-Two reports impossible "negative radiation" readings and loses contact with United Democracies (U.D.) headquarters. Captain Tice and his crew are sent to investigate. They find the Alpha-Two crew immobilized, with some dead, before coming under attack by green glowing energy beings. The creatures immobilize Tice's crew, and the space station disappears. On space station Gamma-One, Commander Halstead sends spaceships to investigate the remaining space stations and evacuates all but skeleton crews. On Earth, meanwhile, the creatures have possessed Captain Dubois and use him to break into the Institute for Advanced Sciences's nuclear reactor. The possessed Dubois sends the U.D. a message offering "symbiotic partnership" for "the good of the whole".

As the energy beings seize each of the space stations and surround the Earth, Dubois relays their demands. Halstead and his crew are taken to Mars, where they find the missing stations and the alien base at an automated uranium mine. Exploring, they discover the corpses of several Delta-Two crew members, who failed to merge with the energy beings because of their "passion and emotion". Dubois reveals that the alien beings are "Diaphanoids" from the Andromeda Galaxy and need humans as host bodies. Halstead and his team are forced to watch a "hosting" ceremony which results in several more deaths. They rescue a pair of female station crew and start a melee with their captors. Opening an outer wall panel, they escape across the surface of Mars to a nearby spacecraft, as the air is expelled, killing all inside the base. The U.D. fleet arrives to bomb the base, but Halstead's ship can't liftoff on its own. Unwilling to let the Diaphanoids escape, Halstead demands the fleet drop its bombs, even though it will almost certainly kill him too. Luckily, they are able to use the blast from the U.D. attack to help lift the spaceship safely into orbit. Back on Earth, Halstead is awarded the U.D. Medal of Honor ... and is court martialed for dereliction of duty. His "punishment" is to be confined to a high end suite in senior officers' quarters along with his most willing paramour Connie Gomez.

== Cast ==
- Tony Russel as Cmdr. Mike Halstead (as Tony Russell)
- Lisa Gastoni as Lt. Connie Gomez (as Jane Fate)
- Franco Nero as Lt. Jake Jacowitz
- Charles Justin as Lt. Ken
- Enzo Fiermonte as General Halstead
- Linda Sini as Lt. Tina Marley
- Nando Angelini as Collins
- John Bartha as Guest from Earth
- Marco Bogliani as UDSCO HQ Duty Technician
- Calisto Calisti as Captain Jamini
- Aldo Canti as Ed - Tice's Crew #2

== See also ==
- List of films featuring space stations
