= Baynes Barron =

American film and television actor

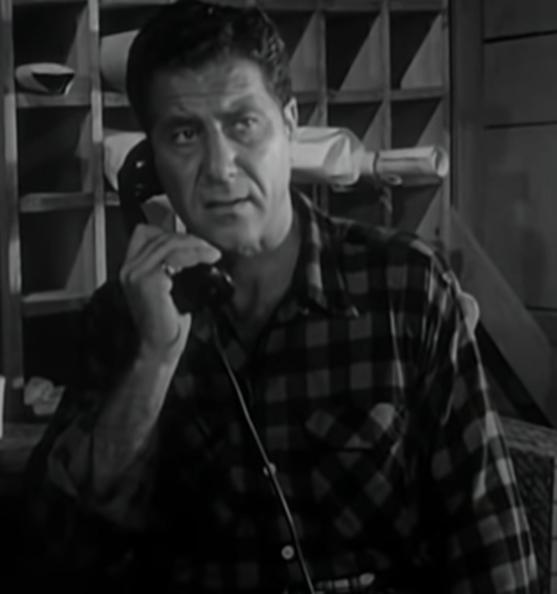
- Barron in Man with a Camera, 1959
- Born: May 29, 1917; New York, U.S.
- Died: July 21, 1982 (aged 65)
- Occupations: Film and television actor
- Years active: 1946–1979

Baynes Barron (May 29, 1917 – July 21, 1982) was an American film and television actor.

== Early life ==
Born in New York. Barron served within World War II as a sergeant in the 28th Infantry Division.

== Career ==
Barron began his career in 1946, first appearing in the film The Secret of the Whistler. He then made his television debut in 1951, making three appearances in the western television series The Adventures of Kit Carson until 1952. He was often cast in numerous roles including a starring role as Ace Benton in the 1959 film Speed Crazy.

Later in his career, Barron guest-starred in numerous television programs including Gunsmoke, Bonanza, Death Valley Days, Perry Mason, Tales of the Texas Rangers, 26 Men, Highway Patrol, Sky King, Planet of the Apes, 77 Sunset Strip, Tales of Wells Fargo, Land of the Giants and Bewitched. He also appeared in numerous films such as The Sun Sets at Dawn (1950), starring Sally Parr and Patrick Waltz; Carbine Williams (1952), starring James Stewart; Prisoners of the Casbah (1953), starring Gloria Grahame, Cesar Romero and Turhan Bey; Phantom of the Rue Morgue (1954), starring Karl Malden; Santiago (1956), starring Alan Ladd and Rossana Podestà; Ambush at Cimarron Pass (1958), starring Scott Brady, Margia Dean and Clint Eastwood and A House Is Not a Home (1964), starring Shelley Winters.

Barron starred in the films From Hell It Came (as Chief Maranka), War Is Hell, (as Sergeant Garth), The Strangler (as Sergeant Mack Clyde) and Space Probe Taurus (as Dr. John Andros). In 1959, he starred in the television series Police Station, where he played as Sergeant White. Barron died in July 1982, at the age of 65.

== Selected filmography ==
- Alfred Hitchcock Presents (1958) (Season 3 Episode 32: "Listen, Listen...!") as Charlie the Bartender
- Alfred Hitchcock Presents (1958) (Season 4 Episode 3: "The Jokester") as Bartender
- Alfred Hitchcock Presents (1960) (Season 6 Episode 13: "The Man Who Found the Money") as Mr. Lent
