= Morlacchi =

Morlacchi is a family name of Italian origin. It might indicate an ultimate family origin connected with the Morlachs, a Balkan ethnic group which had considerable interaction with Italians (particularly those from the Republic of Venice).

Notable people with the surname include:

- Federico Morlacchi (born 1993), Italian paralympic swimmer
- Carlo Gritti Morlacchi (1777–1852), Italian bishop
- Francesco Morlacchi (1784–1841), Italian opera composer
- Giuseppina Morlacchi (1836–1886), Italian dancer
- Lucilla Morlacchi (1936–2014), Italian actress

Morlacchi may also refer to:

- The Italian name for the aforementioned Morlachs
- The Teatro Morlacchi at Perugia, Italy

== See also ==
- Morlachs (disambiguation)
