= Police Station (TV series) =

1959 American television series

- Title card
- Starring: see cast
- Country of origin: United States
- Original language: English
- No. of seasons: 1
- No. of episodes: 39

Production
- Producer: Sandy Howard
- Cinematography: Glen MacWilliams

Original release
- Release: 1959 – 1959

Police Station is an American TV series that aired in 1959. Stories were taken from actual files from throughout the US.

== Production and distribution ==
The show was produced by Sandy Howard.

Harvey Bernhard served as associate producer and Glen MacWilliams was director of photography. Edward J. Allen, chief of police in Santa Ana, California, served as technical advisor. Edward Mann was supervising editor.

Other staff included John Burton as set dresser and Joe Franklin as script supervisor.

The series was produced by Official Films in association with Paramount-Sunset television productions.

39 episodes of 30 minutes were produced and aired in first-run syndication.

== Plot summary ==
The series follow the day-to-day work in a police station in Precinct 11 of a big city, from bookings to investigations. The plot in the pilot episode deal with the cases of a man charged with murdering his father; a woman charged with petty theft; and an out-of-towner arrested for attempted robbery.

== Cast ==
- Baynes Barron as Sergeant White
- Larry Kerr as Detective Chuck Mitchell
- Henry Beckman as Detective Stan Abramson
- Roy Wright as Detective Pat Green
- Edward Platt as Desk Sgt.
- Ron Masak
- Michael Vandever as Derek
- Jack Mann as Sgt. Battle

== Reception ==
According to KTLA spokesman Bob Reagan, the show "took a panning from the press" after the first episode.
