= Secret of the Sphinx =

1964 Italian drama film

- Directed by: Duccio Tessari
- Written by: Duccio Tessari
- Screenplay by: Duccio Tessari; Guido Zurli
- Starring: Tony Russel; Salah Zulfikar; Maria Perschy
- Cinematography: Joe D'Amato
- Edited by: Franco Fraticelli
- Music by: Mario Migliardi
- Release date: 1964
- Country: Italy

Secret of the Sphinx (Italian: La sfinge sorride prima di morire – Stop Londra) is a 1964 film, directed by Duccio Tessari, which stars Tony Russel, Salah Zulfikar, Maria Perschy, Ivan Desny, and Manuela Kent.

== Plot ==
The story unfurls like an Italian Giallo as a group of people meet under strange circumstances, and one by one they are murdered.

Thomas and Hélène meet in Cairo as a Lloyd's of London agent investigates an Egyptian bank robbery. The booty remained buried in the sand and comes back to light following archaeological excavations. The agent suspects that the band of robbers is hiding among the archaeologists who are carrying out the excavations and, in fact, when the expedition returns to Cairo, he discovers that the chests contain the gold stolen from the bank.

== Production ==
The exteriors of the film were shot in Egypt, while Cinecittà was chosen for the interiors. The camera operator was the famous director Joe D'Amato, here credited with his real name, Aristide Massaccesi. The soundtrack was composed by Mario Migliardi.

Tony Russel liked the script and especially the idea of going to Egypt and he accepted the job by turning down the lead in A Fistful of Dollars. He was the only one of his Italian films that he did not dub in English, despite being one of the main voice actors of Italian films. In addition, he had a love affair with Maria Perschy which he ended to stay with his wife. Salah Zulfikar was cast for the character of the Egyptian police officer in the film.

== Reception ==
The film was released in Italy on 4 September 1964 and foreign sales were entrusted to Galatea S-p.A. From Rome. It was released in West Germany in 1964 by "Gloria" under the title Heiße Spur – Kairo-London, in Spain by "Distribuidora Cinematograficas Rosa Films, S.A." with the title La esfinge sonrie ...antes de morir and was released in France on 5 July 1967 with the title Du grisbi au Caire. In the United States it was released on DVD and VHS in 2004 by "Something Weird Video" (SWV) under the title Secret of the Sphinx.

== Cast ==
- Tony Russel: Thomas
- Salah Zulfikar: Ahmed
- Maria Perschy: Hélène Blomberg
- Maria Laura Rocca: Martha
- Ivan Desny: Professor Green
- Gigi Ballista: Agent of Lloyd's of London
- Giuseppe Fortis: Alain Nol
- Evar Maran: Tchurov
- Tullio Altamura
- Franco Ressel
- Joe Kamel

== See also ==
- 1964 in film
- List of Italian films of 1964
- Salah Zulfikar filmography
