= Carlo Giustini =

Italian actor (1916–2005)

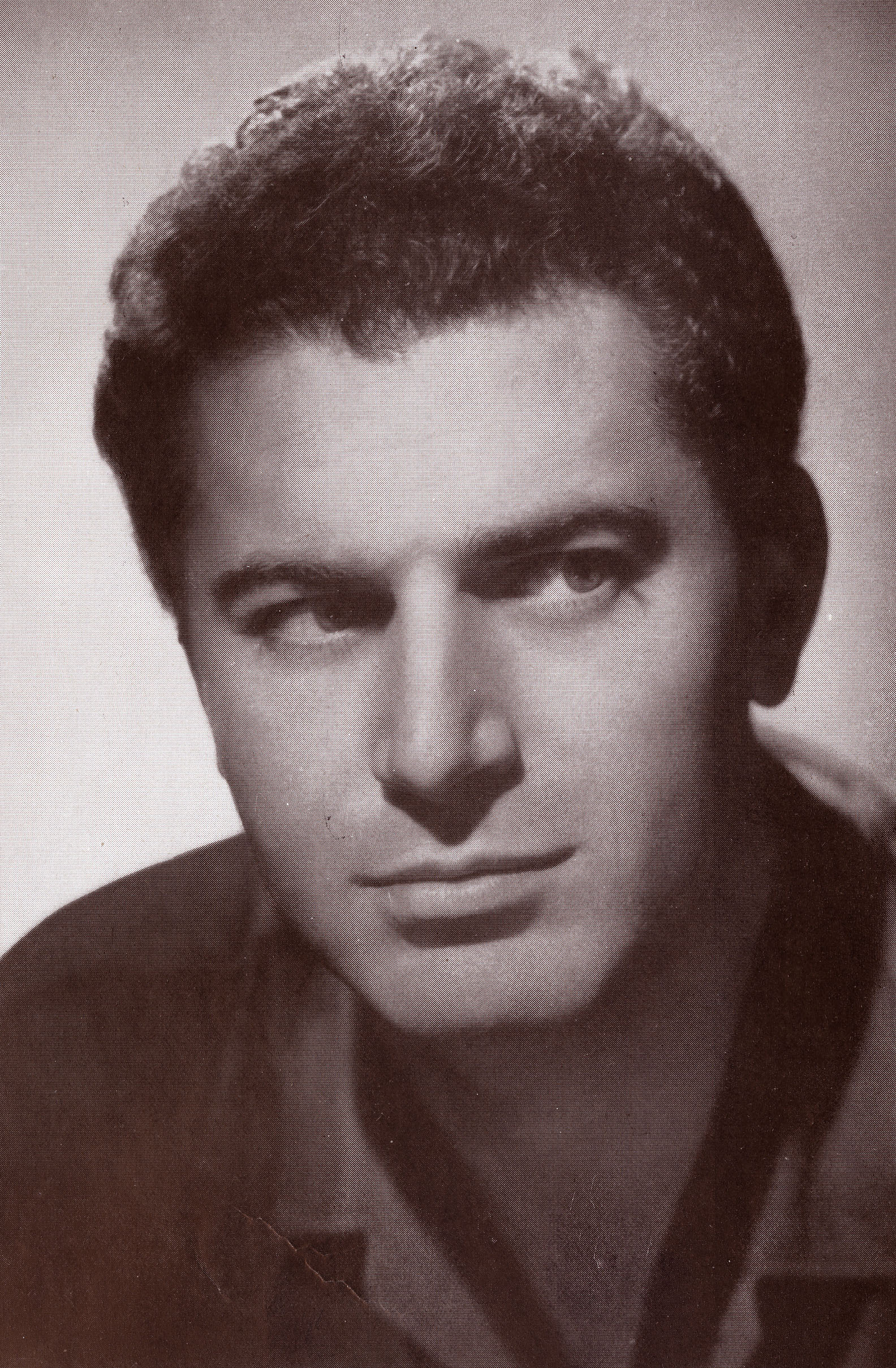
- Giustini c. 1954
- Born: 4 May 1916; Viterbo, Italy
- Died: 26 October 2005 (aged 89); Rome, Italy
- Other names: Carlo Justini, Charles Justin
- Occupation: Actor
- Years active: 1944–1966

Carlo Giustini (4 May 1916 – 26 October 2005), sometimes credited as Carlo Justini, was an Italian actor.

== Life and career ==
Born in Viterbo, the son of a railway employee, Giustini debuted at twenty years old in The Materassi Sisters, after having been chosen through an audition. In the postwar years he was very active in the sentimental and adventurous genres, in which he usually played secondary and supporting roles. He was also cast in several international productions, mainly thanks to his perfect English. He retired from acting shortly after having appeared in two sci-fi films directed back-to-back by Antonio Margheriti in 1965, Wild, Wild Planet and War of the Planets.

Giustini died in Rome on 26 October 2005, at the age of 89.

== Selected filmography ==
- La donna della montagna (1944) - Un giovane montanaro
- The Materassi Sisters (1944) - L'amante della principessa russa
- Fantasmi del mare (1948) - Sergente Banti
- Anthony of Padua (1949) - Padre di Ferdinando
- Alarm Bells (1949) - Marco
- Children of Chance (1949) - Marco
- Rapture (1950)
- Love and Blood (1951) - Paolo Giaccone - un Camorrista
- Shadows Over Naples (1951) - Paolo Giaccone - ein Camorrista
- Tragic Serenade (1951) - don Peppino
- Mamma Mia, What an Impression! (1951) - Arturo
- The Legend of the Piave (1952) - Conte Riccardo Dolfin
- Der bunte Traum (1952) - Pattoni
- Beauties on Motor Scooters (1952) - Alberto
- Sins of Rome (1953) - Artorige
- Prisoner in the Tower of Fire (1953) - Marco Pepli
- Nero and the Burning of Rome (1953) - Britannico
- Three Coins in the Fountain (1954)
- Knights of the Queen (1954)
- I cavalieri dell'illusione (1954)
- La sultana Safiyè (1955)
- La ragazza di via Veneto (1955)
- The Baby and the Battleship (1956) - First Vespucci Brother
- The Passionate Stranger (1957) - Carlo / Mario
- La trovatella di Pompei (1957) - Roberto Ventura
- The Silent Enemy (1958) - Fellini
- Intent to Kill (1958) - Francisco Flores
- The Whole Truth (1958) - Leading Man
- The Naked Maja (1958) - José
- The Siege of Pinchgut (1959) - Luke
- Messalina (1960) - Lusio Geta
- The Savage Innocents (1960) - Second Trooper
- Mistress of the World (1960) - Seemann John
- World in My Pocket (1961) - Pierre
- Amazons of Rome (1961) - Bruto
- The Story of Joseph and His Brethren (1961) - Reuben, Joseph's Brother
- El Cid (1961) - Bermúdez
- Barabbas (1961) - Officer
- La tragica notte di Assisi (1960) - Francesco d'Assisi
- Pontius Pilate (1962) - Decio
- Damon and Pythias (1962) - Cariso
- Between Shanghai and St. Pauli (1962) - Carlos
- I Don Giovanni della Costa Azzurra (1962) - Capitano Yacht
- Wild, Wild Planet (1966) - Ken, Lieutenant
- War of the Planets (1966) - Ken (final film role)
