= Burt Topper =

American film producer (1928–2007)

- Topper, c. 2000-2004
- Born: July 31, 1928; Coney Island, New York City
- Died: April 3, 2007 (aged 78); Cedars-Sinai Medical Center, Los Angeles
- Occupations: Film director and screenwriter

Burt Topper (July 31, 1928 – April 3, 2007) was an American film director and screenwriter best known for cult films aimed at teenagers.

== Biography ==
Born in Coney Island, New York City, Topper moved to Los Angeles at the age of 8, and served in the United States Navy during World War II. He was working at the Horseshoe Stage in 1954 and wanted to make a movie. He and several friends got together and made Hell Squad over six months using their own money. This was picked up for distribution by American International Pictures and launched his career.

In 1958 AIP announced Topper would make a series of films for them, including Tank Destroyers, Last Woman on Earth, Young Warrior, and Yacht Party. Not all of these were produced, but Topper would be associated with AIP for the rest of his career.

Topper's 1963 film War Is Hell (which he wrote, produced, directed and played a small role as an army lieutenant) was playing at the Texas Theatre in Dallas on November 22, 1963. Lee Harvey Oswald snuck into the theatre and viewed it briefly before being arrested.

He also wrote, produced, directed and narrated fundraising films for the Variety Clubs of America.

In the mid-1960s Topper acted as an in house producer for American International. He left them in 1969 to re-enter independent production but still maintained strong links with AIP. In 1972 he announced he would make 15 live action films worth $10.5 million but this did not eventuate.

Topper died of heart failure at Cedars-Sinai Medical Center in Los Angeles.

== Selected filmography ==
- Hell Squad (1958) - writer, producer, director
- Tank Commandos (1959) - writer, producer, director
- Diary of a High School Bride (1959) - writer, producer, director
- The Wild Ride (1960) - story
- War Is Hell (1963) - writer, producer, director
- The Strangler (1964) - director
- Space Probe Taurus (1965) - producer, second unit director
- Fireball 500 (1966) - co-producer
- Thunder Alley (1967) - producer
- Devil's Angels (1967) - producer
- Wild in the Streets (1968) - executive producer
- The Devil's 8 (1969) - producer, director
- The Heart of Variety (1969) (documentary) - narrator, writer
- The Hard Ride (1971) - writer, executive producer, director
- The Variety Legacy (1974) (documentary) - writer, producer, director
- Soul Hustler (1976) - writer, producer, director
- C.H.O.M.P.S. (1979) - co-producer, second unit director

=== Unmade films ===
- Hell's Belles (circa 1968) - proposed motorcycle film which Topper was to produce for AIP to be directed by Rod Amateau
- Hell No We Won't Go (circa 1968) - for his own company
- Hot Rod Inferno (circa 1968)
- Ten Thousand Graves (1969) - war comedy for AIP
- Shake Him Till He Rattles (1969)
