= But You Were Dead =

- Directed by: Gianni Vernuccio
- Screenplay by: Enzo Ferraris
- Story by: Gianni Vernuccio
- Produced by: Gianni Vernuccio
- Starring: Alba Rigazzi; Cristina Gaioni; Alex Morrison
- Cinematography: Gianni Vernuccio
- Edited by: Gianni Vernuccio
- Music by: Giorgio Gaslini
- Production company: Mercurfin Italiana
- Distributed by: Mercurfin
- Release date: 1 October 1966 (Italy)
- Country: Italy
- Box office: 61,000,000 Italian lire

But You Were Dead (Italian: La lunga notte di Veronique, lit. 'The Long Night of Veronique') is a 1966 Italian film directed, produced, shot and edited by Gianni Vernuccio.

== Plot ==
After his parents are killed in a car accident, Giovanni Bernardi visits his grandfather, Count Marco Anselmi. While staying at the old man's villa, he sees a ghost-like girl named Veronique. Giovanni learns that she died in World War I but her spirit still wanders the grounds and haunts the living.

== Cast ==
- Alba Rigazzi - Veronique
- Cristina Gaioni - Cristina
- Alex Morrison
- Antonio Bellani
- Walter Pozzi - Count Marco Anselmi
- Jeanine Falconi

== Production ==
But You Were Dead was funded by the small Milan-based company Mercurfin and was shot entirely in Lombardy. Italian film historian Roberto Curti stated that although the film was marketed as a horror film, it was more of a "supernatural melodrama"

== Release ==
But You Were Dead was distributed theatrically in Italy by Mercurfin on 1 October 1966. The film grossed a total of 61 million Italian lire domestically. It was released on VHS in Italy by Cosmo Video. The film was released in the United Kingdom with the title But You Were Dead.

== Reception ==
In a contemporary review, the Monthly Film Bulletin declared the film to be "singularly tedious", noting that the "pace is funereal, the dubbed dialogue is more risible than unnerving, and an already confused narrative is made virtually impenetrable by the director's penchant for inserting flashbacks at arbitrary intervals."

From retrospective reviews, Curti felt that with a better director, the story might have worked better, overcoming weak acting and a muddled script. In Phil Hardy and Tom Milne's The Encyclopedia of Horror Movies, a review described the film as a "slow, laboured ghost story" Louis Paul described the film as "obscure" in his book on Italian Horror film directors and that it was attempting to replicate the Gothic films of the early 1960s but does not end up like those films.
