= Texas Theatre =

Movie theater in Dallas, scene of Lee Harvey Oswald's arrest

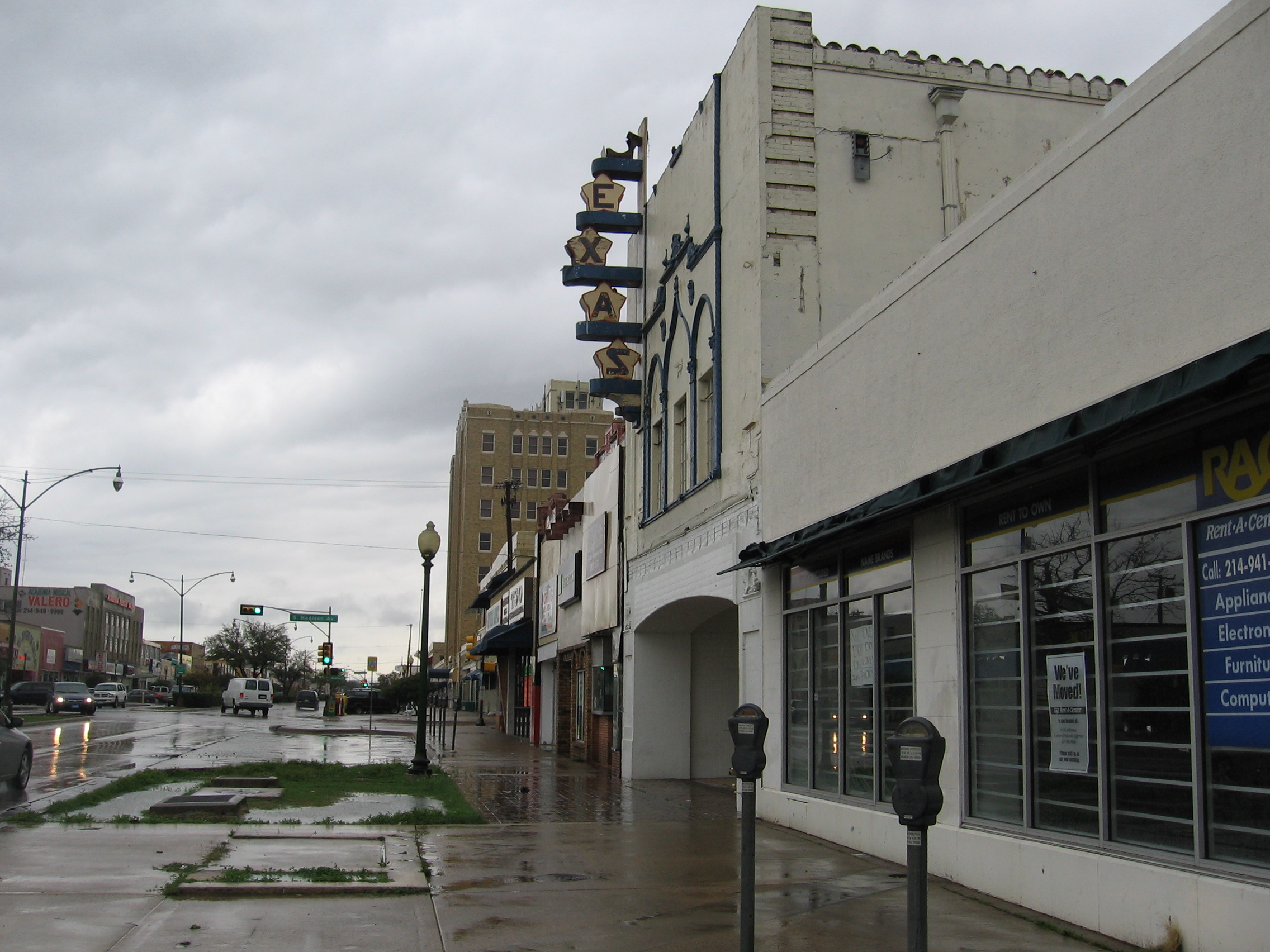
- Texas Theatre during restorations in 2006

- Location within Texas Location within the United States
- Address: 231 W. Jefferson Blvd. Dallas, Texas; United States
- Coordinates: 32°44′36″N 96°49′32″W
- Owner: Oak Cliff Foundation
- Operator: Aviation Cinemas
- Type: movie palace
- Screen: 2
- Acreage: 0.2793 acres (0.1130 ha)
- Current use: Cinema

Construction
- Opened: April 21, 1931
- Architect: W. Scott Dunne
- Builder: Oak Cliff Amusement Co.

Website
- The Texas Theatre
- Texas Theatre
- U.S. National Register of Historic Places
- Recorded Texas Historic Landmark
- Dallas Landmark
- Architectural style: Italian Renaissance
- MPS: Oak Cliff MPS
- NRHP reference No.: 03000187
- RTHL No.: 17723
- DLMK No.: H/112

Significant dates
- Added to NRHP: April 1, 2003
- Designated RTHL: 2013
- Designated DLMK: October 10, 2001

The Texas Theatre is a movie theater and Dallas landmark located in the Oak Cliff neighborhood of Dallas, Texas. It became famous, on November 22, 1963, as the location of Lee Harvey Oswald's arrest over the suspicion he was the killer of Dallas police officer J. D. Tippit and President John F. Kennedy. Today, it hosts a mix of repertory cinema and special events.

== History ==
The Texas Theatre opened on April 21, 1931. The Texas Theatre was the largest suburban movie theater in Dallas and was part of a chain of theaters financed by Howard Hughes. It was the first theater in Dallas with air conditioning and featured many state-of-the-art luxuries.

The theater is most famous for being the site of Lee Harvey Oswald's arrest on November 22, 1963. Warren "Butch" Burroughs, manager and concession stand attendee the afternoon of Oswald's arrest, said that Oswald came into the theater between 1:00 and 1:07 pm. Burroughs further claimed he sold Oswald popcorn at 1:15 p.m. Julie Postal, the ticket seller, who was posted out in front of the entrance, told the Warren Commission that Burroughs initially told her the same thing although, when she later discussed the event with him, she became skeptical about his version. Julia Postal, however, never saw Oswald enter the theater, relying on the account of Johnny Calvin Brewer, a manager at Hardy's Shoe Store's which, according to the official government report, happened at 1:35 p.m. Texas Theatre patron Jack Davis also corroborated Burroughs' time, claiming he observed Oswald in the theater prior to 1:20 pm. The films presented that day were Cry of Battle and War Is Hell, which Oswald briefly viewed.

As a commemoration of the historic capture, the words "Lee Harvey Oswald, November 22, 1963" were later inscribed in gold paint on the chair Oswald (supposedly) occupied — three rows from the rear, five seats from the aisle. However, the actual chair was removed by then manager "Butch" Burroughs, who took it home and replaced it with another which the FBI confiscated the next day for evidence thinking it was the original Oswald seat.

The theater closed in 1989 and the Texas Theatre Historical Society (TTHS) purchased it the following year. This allowed Oliver Stone to remodel the exterior façade for his 1991 film, JFK. However, by 1992, the Society was no longer able to fund the property and the theater closed again. Former usher and sign changer Don Dubois of Texas Rosewin-Midway Properties saved the theater from the wrecking ball in 1993, but two years later, it was nearly destroyed by a five-alarm fire, forcing another closure. In 1996, Pedro Villa stepped in to rescue the theater from another plan which would have demolished the structure and replaced it with a furniture warehouse. However, he was unable to obtain financing to restore the theater and it defaulted to Texas Rosewin-Midway Properties. The fire-damaged building remained vacant for three years, open to vandals, stray animals, and the elements.

In 2001, the Oak Cliff Foundation acquired the structure and began renovations after receiving $1.6 million from the Dallas Neighborhood Renaissance Partnership. Since then, the board of the Oak Cliff Foundation has raised an additional $2 million of the estimated $9 million needed for the complete renovation of the theater. The foundation used the funds to secure and restore the building needed after years of neglect and fire damage and the venue began hosting movies and special events soon after.

In September 2010, Aviation Cinemas, Inc. signed a lease to operate the theater as an independent and repertory cinema, with hopes of presenting live theater and concerts in the future.

In November 2017, a historical marker was installed in front of the theater which read "On November 22, 1963, following the assassination of President John F. Kennedy, Lee Harvey Oswald was apprehended in the auditorium".

After being closed for most of 2020, during the height of the COVID pandemic, the theater was remodeled and reopened in September 2021 as a two-screen venue, with main theater capacity of 670 seats and 165 balcony theater seats.

On November 22, 2023, the theater organized several "JFK 60 Day" memorial events.

The theater occasionally holds premieres and screenings. On July 29, 2025, Francis Ford Coppola screened his film Megalopolis as part of a nationwide tour, followed by an in-depth interactive discussion and Q&A called “How to Change Our Future.”

On November 21, 2025, actor Fred Armisen received Dallas Video Fest's Ernie Kovacs Award at the theater. The event included screenings of Ernie Kovacs and Buster Keaton films featuring accompaniment by Ben Model.

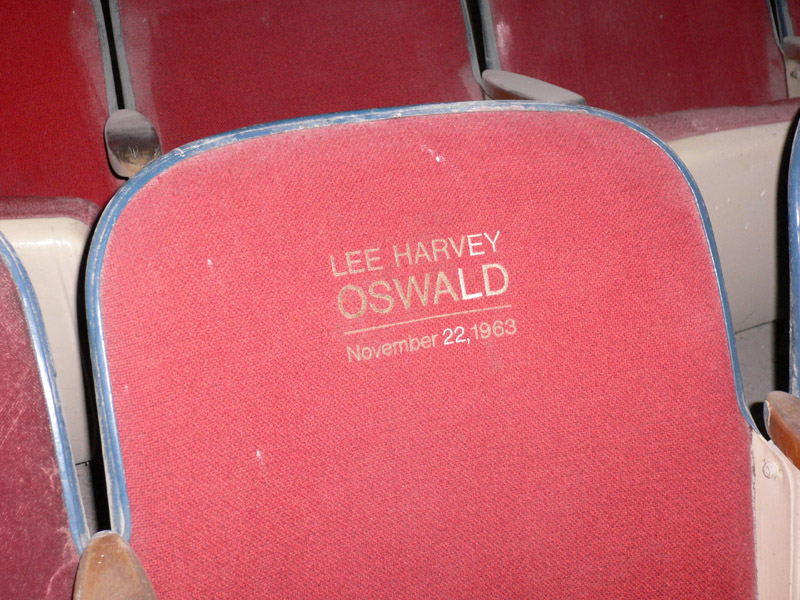
The seat Lee Harvey Oswald briefly occupied before his arrest

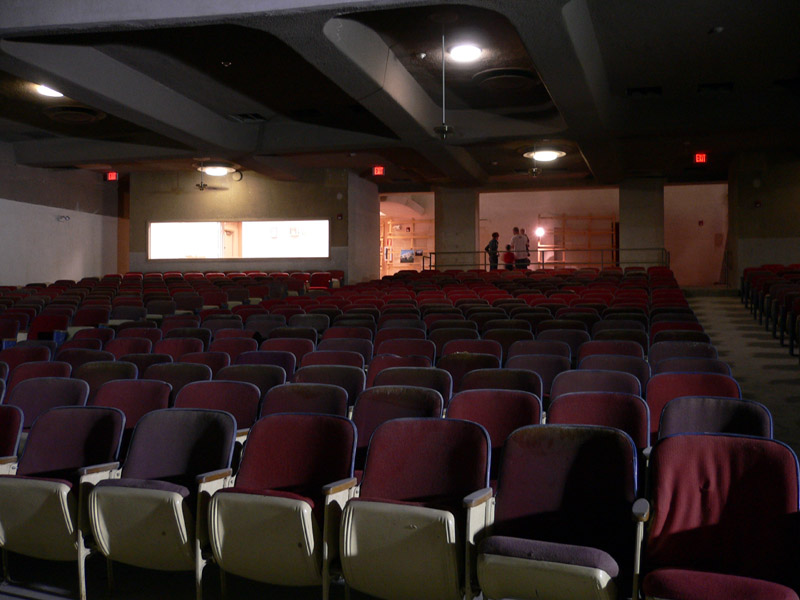
Theatre interior in 2005

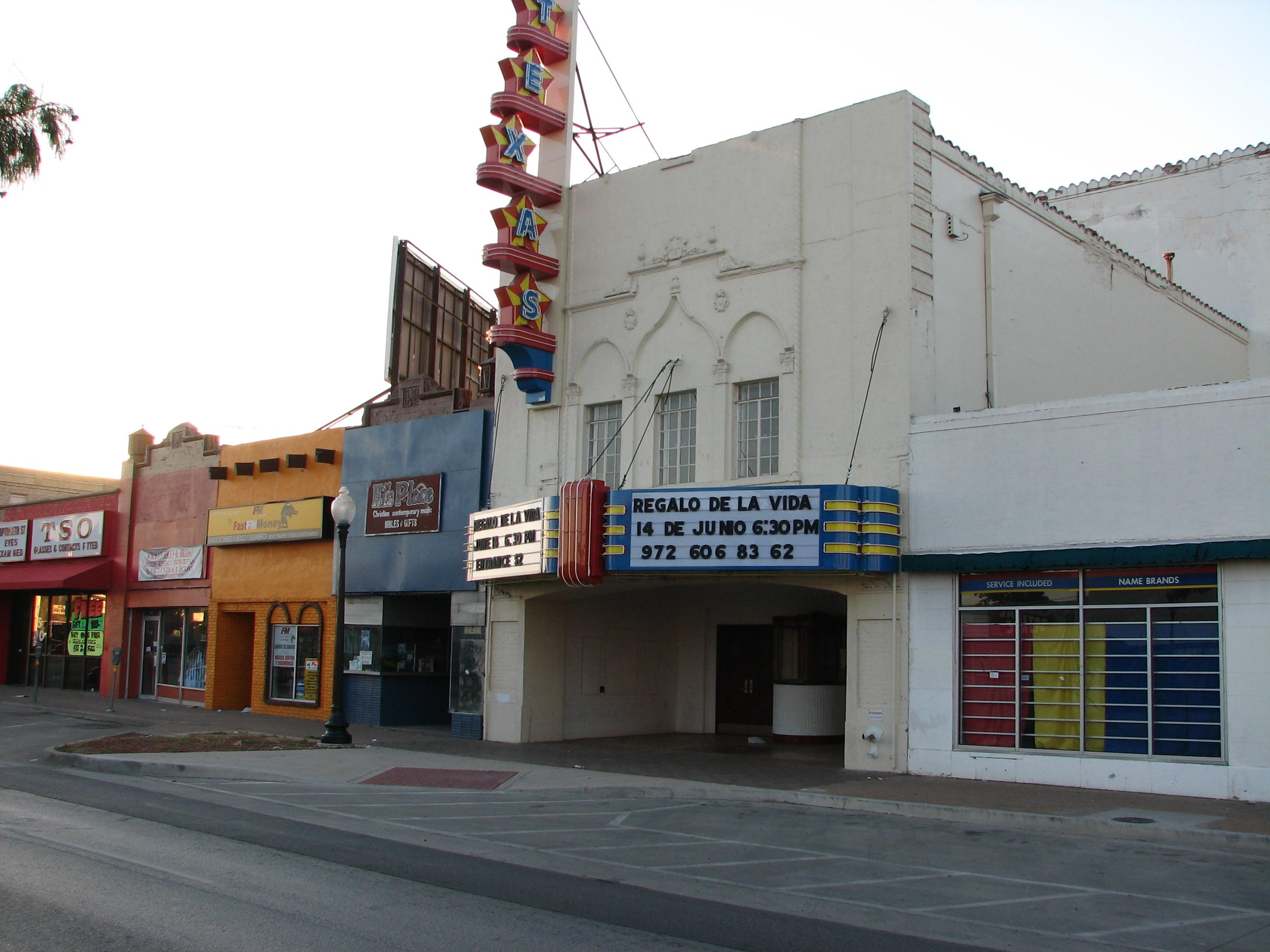
A replica marquee, added c. 2006, and restored facade in 2008

== See also ==
- National Register of Historic Places listings in Dallas County, Texas
- Recorded Texas Historic Landmarks in Dallas County
- List of Dallas Landmarks
