= Honeymoon, Italian Style =

- Directed by: Mario Amendola
- Written by: Mario Amendola
- Starring: Tony Russel; Concha Velasco; Ferruccio Amendola
- Cinematography: Emilio Foriscot
- Edited by: Luciano Cavalieri
- Music by: Coriolano Gori
- Production companies: Arturo González Producciones Cinematográficas; Frine Film
- Distributed by: Selecta Film (Italy); Regia-Arturo González Rodríguez (Spain)
- Release date: 1966
- Running time: 90 minutes
- Countries: Italy; Spain
- Language: Italian

Honeymoon, Italian Style (Italian: Viaggio di nozze all'italiana) is a 1966 Italian-Spanish comedy film directed by Mario Amendola and starring Tony Russel, Concha Velasco and Ferruccio Amendola. The film's sets were designed by the art director Francisco Canet.

== Cast ==
- Tony Russel as Barone Frescobaldi
- Concha Velasco as Rosetta de Curtis
- Ferruccio Amendola as Pasquale
- Elio Crovetto as Funzionario al Casinò
- Ana María Custodio as donna di Camilo
- Luigi De Filippo as Camilluccio
- Alberto Farnese as Portiere dell'Hotel
- Litz Kibiska as La Bionda
- Anna Maestri as Pallina
- Renzo Montagnani as Nicola
- Antonio Ozores as Salvatore Catella
- George Rigaud as Barone Luigi
- Carlo Rizzo as Direttore dell'Hotel
- Rosita Rizzo as Donna Carmela
- Marisa Solinas as Gina
- Toni Ucci as Pallino

== Bibliography ==
- Small, Pauline. Sophia Loren: Moulding the Star. Intellect Books, 2009.
