= José Gallardo =

Peruvian footballer (born 2001)

Personal information
- Full name: José Anthony Gallardo Flores
- Date of birth: 15 February 2001 (age 25)
- Place of birth: Chiclayo, Peru
- Height: 1.74 m (5 ft 9 in)
- Positions: Right winger; right-back

Youth career
- Alianza Lima

Senior career*
Years	Team	Apps	(Gls)
2019–2021	Alianza Lima	7	(0)
2020	→ Carlos Mannucci (loan)	5	(0)
2022	Unión Comercio	3	(0)
2023–2025	Deportivo Llacuabamba	40	(3)
2025	Deportivo Garcilaso	7	(0)
- * Club domestic league appearances and goals as of 19:28, 3 January 2026 (UTC)

José Anthony Gallardo Flores (born 15 February 2001) is a Peruvian footballer who plays as a right winger.

== Career ==
=== Club career ===
Gallardo was born in Chiclayo but moved to Lima at the age of five. When he was 11 years old, he joined Alianza Lima. He started training with the first time in the beginning of 2019 and on 12 May 2019, he got his official debut for Alianza against FBC Melgar. Gallardo started on the bench, but replaced Mauricio Matzuda after 73 minutes. Gallardo was noted for an assist to the winning goal in the last minute.

Gallardo did only play 63 minutes of three matches and for that reason, he was loaned out in January 2020 to fellow Peruvian Primera División side Carlos A. Mannucci for the whole year. Gallardo was left without contract at the end of 2021.

In March 2022, Gallardo joined Unión Comercio. A year later, ahead of the 2023 season, he moved to Deportivo Llacuabamba. In July 2025, he moved to Deportivo Garcilaso.

== Honours ==
Alianza Lima

- Liga 1: 2021
