= Target Goldseven =

- Directed by: Alberto Leonardi
- Written by: Preston Leonide; María del Carmen Martínez Román
- Produced by: Angel Roson
- Starring: Tony Russel; Erika Blanc
- Cinematography: Alfonso Nieva
- Music by: Piero Umiliani
- Release date: 1966

Target Goldseven (Italian: Tecnica di una spia, Spanish: Técnica de un espía) is a 1966 Italian-Spanish Eurospy film directed by Alberto Leonardi and starring Tony Russel and Erika Blanc. It was shot between Portugal and Rome.

== Cast ==
- Tony Russel as Alan Milner
- Erika Blanc as Erika Brown
- Conrado San Martín as Otis
- Dyanik Zurakowska as Mitzi (as Diannyk Zurakowska)
- Fernando Cebrián as Kare
- Adriano Micantoni as Louis Kerez Fischer (as Peter White)
- Wilbert Bradley as Steiner
- Antonio Pica as Alex
