= Lucilla Morlacchi =

Italian actress (1936–2014)

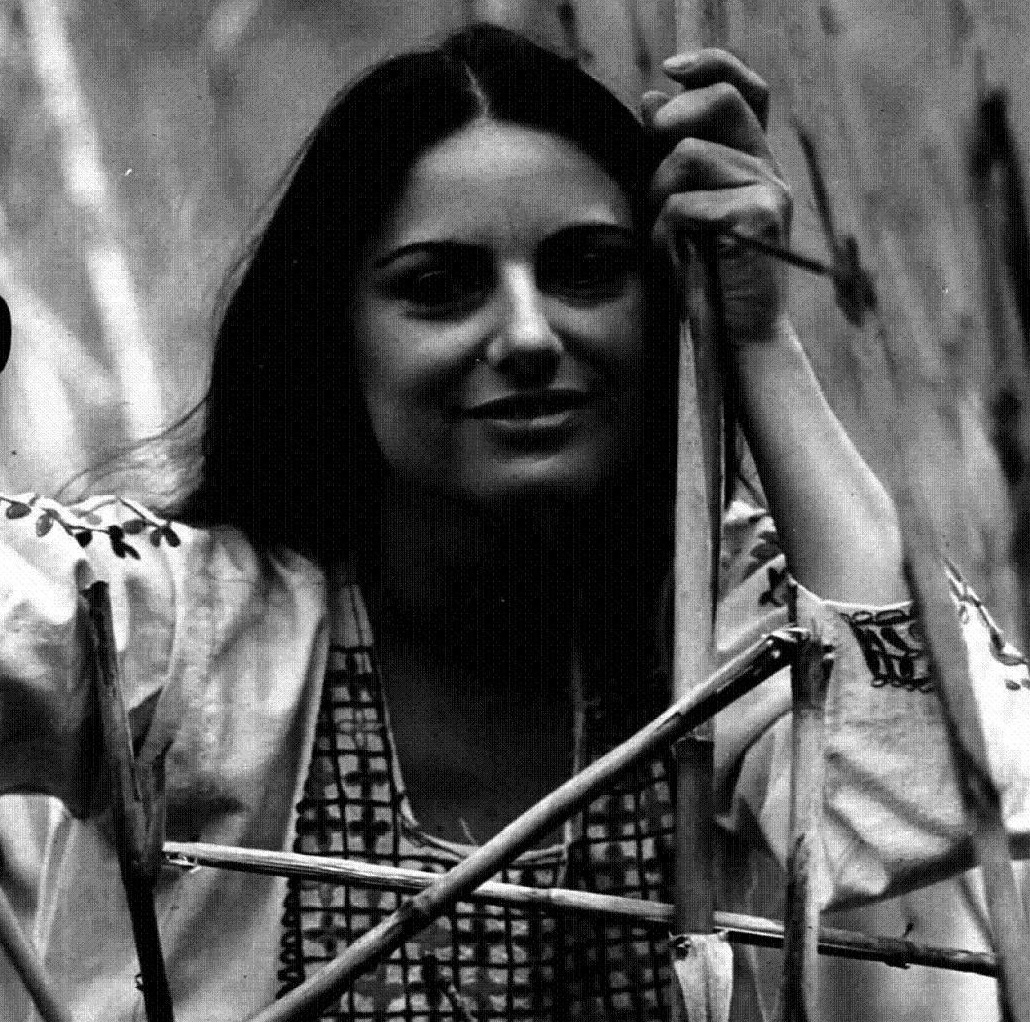
- Born: 29 April 1936; Milan, Italy
- Died: 13 November 2014 (aged 78); Milan, Italy
- Occupation: Actress

Lucilla Morlacchi (29 April 1936 – 13 November 2014) was an Italian film, television and stage actress.

Born in Milan in 1936, Morlacchi studied at the Accademia dei Filodrammatici and made her theatrical debut in 1956 in the comedy play Il maggiore Barbara, with the stage company of Ernesto Calindri and Lina Volonghi.

On stage she worked with notable directors such as Luchino Visconti and Sergio Castellitto. In films, she was often cast in character roles, and may be best-remembered as "Concetta" in The Leopard.

== See also ==
- Morlacchi
