= A Stroke of 1000 Millions =

- Directed by: Paolo Heusch
- Written by: Fulvio Gicca Palli; José Luis Jerez Aloza; Pierre Lévy
- Starring: Rik Van Nutter; Marilù Tolo
- Cinematography: Rafael Pacheco; Fausto Rossi
- Music by: Piero Umiliani
- Release date: 1966
- Language: Italian

A Stroke of 1000 Millions (Italian: Un colpo da mille miliardi, Spanish: Un golpe de mil millones, French: Intrigue à Suez) is a 1966 Italian-Spanish-French Eurospy film directed by Paolo Heusch and starring Rik Van Nutter. It was shot in Egypt, Spain, Istanbul and Rome.

== Cast ==
- Rik Van Nutter as Fraser
- Marilù Tolo as Prinzi
- Eduardo Fajardo as Teopulos
- Philippe Hersent as Gottlieb
- José Jaspe
- Massimo Pietrobon as Shelby
- Jacques Santi
- Rita Berger as Liane
- Peter Haller as Captain
- Tom Felleghy as Fraser's Boss
