= Rik Van Nutter =

American actor (1929–2005)

- Autographed photo
- Born: Frederick Allen Nutter; May 1, 1929; Pomona, California, U.S.
- Died: October 15, 2005 (aged 76); West Palm Beach, Florida, U.S.
- Occupation: Actor
- Years active: 1959–1979
- Spouse: Anita Ekberg (m. 1963; div. 1975)

Frederick Allen Nutter (May 1, 1929 – October 15, 2005), known professionally as Rik Van Nutter and occasionally as Clyde Rogers, was an American actor who mostly appeared in Italian-produced films. He is also remembered for playing Felix Leiter in the James Bond picture Thunderball.

== Biography ==
Van Nutter is best known for playing the third version of Felix Leiter in the James Bond film Thunderball (1965). He also had a role alongside Peter Ustinov in Romanoff and Juliet (1961), and his later films included Foxbat (1977) with Henry Silva and Vonetta McGee and the Jim Brown World War II adventure Pacific Inferno (1979).

Van Nutter was married to film actress Anita Ekberg from 1963 until 1975. They lived in Spain and Switzerland and started a shipping business together.

Van Nutter died on October 15, 2005, at the age of 76.

== Filmography ==
Year	Title	Role	Notes
1959	Guardatele ma non toccatele	Charlie	
1959	Uncle Was a Vampire	Victor	Uncredited
1960	Assignment: Outer Space	Ray Peterson (IZ41)	
1960	The Passionate Thief		
1960	Some Like It Cold	German Officer	
1961	Romanoff and Juliet	Freddie	
1962	Tharus Son of Attila	Oto	
1965	The Revenge of Ivanhoe	Ivanhoe	Credited as Clyde Rogers
1965	Seven Hours of Gunfire	Buffalo Bill Cody	Credited as Clyde Rogers
1965	Thunderball	Felix Leiter	
1966	A Stroke of 1000 Millions	Fraser	
1967	Dynamite Joe	Agent Joe Ford	
1977	Foxbat	Crays	
1979	Pacific Inferno	Dennis	(final film role)

Preceded by Cec Linder	Felix Leiter actor 1965	Succeeded by Norman Burton
