= Nando Gazzolo =

Italian actor (1928–2015)

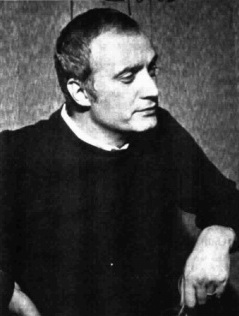
- Born: Ferdinando Gazzolo; 16 October 1928; Savona, Italy
- Died: 16 November 2015 (aged 87); Nepi, Italy
- Occupations: Actor; voice actor
- Years active: 1948–2015
- Spouse: Rita Di Leonardo (m. 1961; died 1999)
- Children: 3, including Matteo Gazzolo
- Parents: Lauro Gazzolo (father); Aida Ottaviani Piccolo (mother)
- Relatives: Virginio Gazzolo (paternal half-brother)

Ferdinando "Nando" Gazzolo (16 October 1928 – 16 November 2015) was an Italian actor and voice actor.

== Biography ==
Born in Savona, the son of the actor and voice actor Lauro Gazzolo and EIAR radio announcer Aida Ottaviani Piccolo, Gazzolo debuted at young age on radio, and in 1948, at twenty years old, he started his acting career entering the stage company led by Antonio Gandusio. He achieved his first personal success in 1951, in the adaptation of Antonio e Cleopatra staged by Renzo Ricci. He later worked on stage with Vittorio Gassman and Luigi Squarzina, among others, before focusing on voice acting and dubbing. Gazzolo was also active in films and starred in several TV-series of good success.

As a voice actor, Gazzolo voiced the main character in Bruno Bozzetto's animated spaghetti western West and Soda and served as the regular dubbing voice for Peter Cushing, David Niven and Richard Widmark. Other actors he occasionally dubbed included Rex Harrison, Michael Caine, Frank Sinatra, Yul Brynner, Marlon Brando, Robert Duvall, Donald Sutherland, Laurence Olivier, Clint Eastwood, Louis Jourdan, Henry Fonda and was also the voice of the narrator in the Italian dubbed version of Beauty and the Beast.

=== Personal life ===
Gazzolo was married with three children. One of whom, Matteo, is also an actor. He also had a half-brother, Virginio, from his father's second marriage.

== Death ==
Gazzolo died on 16 November 2015 in Nepi, aged 87.

== Filmography ==
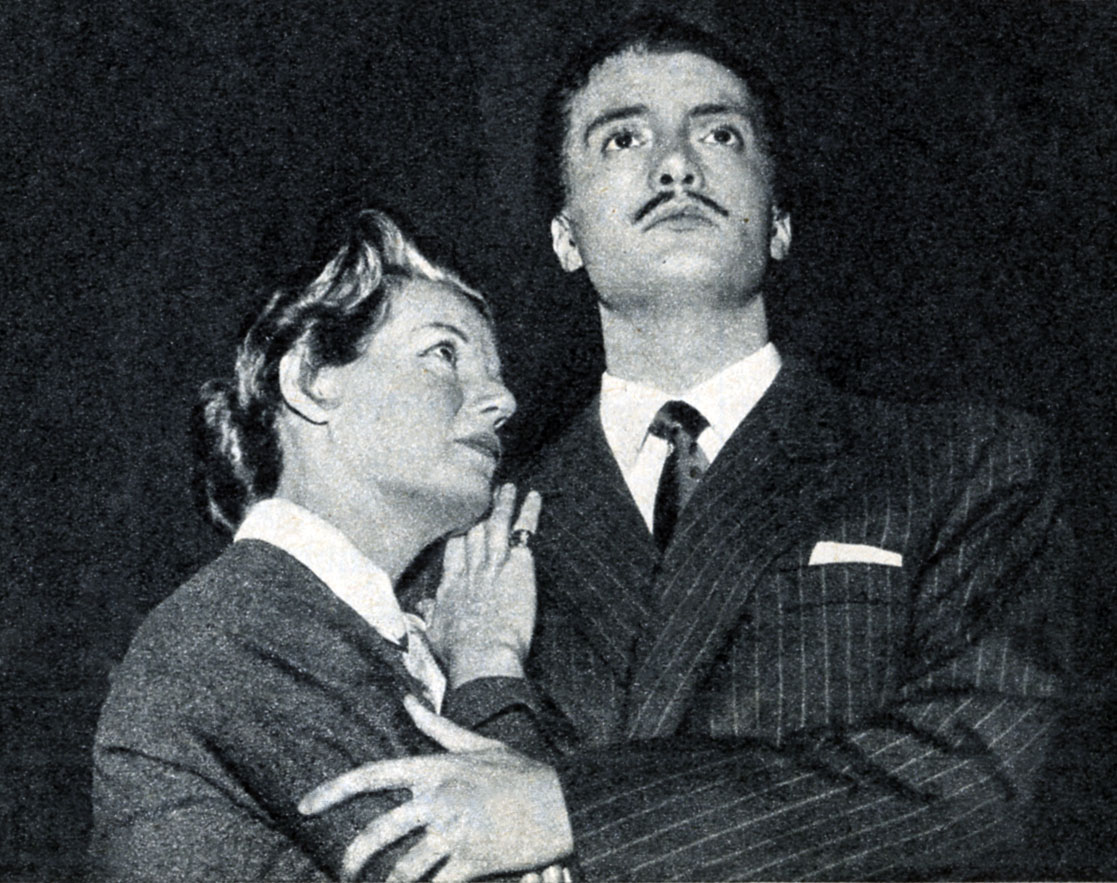
Gazzolo on stage with actress Laura Solari (1956)

=== Cinema ===
- Black Sunday (1960) - Narrator (voice, uncredited)
- Letto a tre piazze (1960) - Narrator (voice)
- Constantine and the Cross (1961) - Licinius
- The Trojan Horse (1961) - Narrator (voice)
- Jeff Gordon, Secret Agent (1963) - Le docteur Mercier
- Toto and Cleopatra (1963) - Narrator (voice, uncredited)
- The Mystery of the Indian Temple (1963) - Narrator (voice)
- La Cittadella (1964, TV Mini-Series) - Freddie Hamson
- Gladiators Seven (1964) - Sar / Milo
- Pirates of Malaysia (1964) - Lt. Clintock
- West and Soda (1965) - Johnny (voice)
- The Spy with Ten Faces (1966) - Kobras
- The Hills Run Red (1966) - Ken Seagull / Ken Milton
- Django Shoots First (1966) - Ken Kluster
- La volpe e le camelie (1966)
- Un caso di coscienza (1970) - Alfredo Serpieri
- Maddalena (1971)
- Il nano e la strega (1973) - Narrator (voice)
- Angeli a Sud (1992)
- Magnificat (1993) - Narrator (voice)
- Valeria medico legale (2000-2002, TV Series) - Il procuratore
- The Comeback (2001)
- Our Tropical Island (2001) - Tacchini
- Le ragioni del cuore (2002, TV Mini-Series)
- Il sottile fascino del peccato (2010) - Padre Edo (final film role)

== Dubbing roles ==
=== Animation ===
- Narrator in Shakespeare: The Animated Tales, Beauty and the Beast, My Patrasche
- Ricochet Rabbit in Ricochet Rabbit & Droop-a-Long (1st Italian dub)
- Captain Dogwood in The New Adventures of Little Toot
- Urkesks/Narrator in The Dark Crystal

=== Live action ===
- Narrator in Paths of Glory, Jules and Jim, Solomon and Sheba
- Ramón Rojo in A Fistful of Dollars
- El Indio in For a Few Dollars More
- Phileas Fogg in Around the World in 80 Days
- Raymond in Bonjour Tristesse
- Major David Angus Pollock in Separate Tables
- Miles Doughton in Ask Any Girl
- Chris Walters in Happy Anniversary
- Lawrence Mackay in Please Don't Eat the Daisies
- Corporal Miller in The Guns of Navarone
- Sir Charles Lytton in The Pink Panther
- Lawrence Jameson in Bedtime Story
- James Bond in Casino Royale
- Colonel Race in Death on the Nile
- Memnon in Alexander the Great
- Sherlock Holmes in The Hound of the Baskervilles
- John Banning in The Mummy
- Abraham Van Helsing in The Brides of Dracula
- Dr. Namaroff in The Gorgon
- Dr. Schreck in Dr. Terror's House of Horrors
- Mike King in How the West Was Won
- Johnny Gannon in Warlock
- Clint Hollister in The Law and Jake Wade
- William Edwards in Time Limit
- Tom Rossiter in Alvarez Kelly
- Ralph Anderson in The Trap
- Rolfe in The Long Ships
- Henry Higgins in My Fair Lady
- Doctor John Dolittle in Doctor Dolittle
- Old Man Marley in Home Alone
- Cledus "Snowman" Snow in Smokey and the Bandit
- Ross Webster in Superman III
- Matthew Yelland in The Final Countdown
