= The Hills Run Red (1966 film) =

1966 film

- Italian film poster
- Directed by: Carlo Lizzani
- Screenplay by: Piero Regnoli
- Story by: Piero Regnoli
- Produced by: Ermanno Donati; Luigi Carpentieri
- Starring: Thomas Hunter; Henry Silva; Dan Duryea; Nando Gazzolo; Nicoletta Machiavelli; Gianna Serra
- Cinematography: Antonio Secchi
- Edited by: Ornella Micheli
- Music by: Ennio Morricone
- Production companies: Dino De Laurentiis Cinematografica; CB Films
- Release date: September 1966 (Italy)
- Countries: Italy; Spain
- Languages: Italian; English

The Hills Run Red (Italian: Un Fiume di dollari, lit. 'A River of Dollars') is a 1966 spaghetti Western film directed by Carlo Lizzani. The film stars Thomas Hunter in the heroic lead role, along with veteran American actors Henry Silva and Dan Duryea.

== Plot synopsis ==
In the aftermath of the American Civil War, two rebel Texans are seen fleeing toward the Mexican border in a wagon, having made off with a huge sum of money stolen from the United States government. Just before reaching the safety of foreign soil they are intercepted by a U.S. army patrol. As the mounted soldiers close in, the men draw cards to decide who will stay on the wagon and draw the pursuit, and who will jump off with the loot and escape, keeping the other man's share safe until he can claim it. Ken Seagull (Nando Gazzolo) wins the draw, jumps off and successfully hides. Jerry Brewster (Thomas Hunter) crashes the wagon, is apprehended by the troopers, and is sent to a military prison.

Five years later, Brewster is released and returns home to reunite with his wife and son. He finds his house deserted and in ruins, but discovers his wife's journal, which tells him that Seagull not only gave her no aid, but told her nothing of the money or the fact that her husband was alive. Maddened by the betrayal, the unarmed Brewster immediately finds himself under gunfire: Seagull has learned of his release and sent men to get him out of the way once and for all. Running into the barn for cover, Brewster finds a mysterious stranger (Dan Duryea) who throws him a weapon with which Brewster kills his attackers. His benefactor, who introduces himself as Winnie Getz, offers to tell Seagull that, while Brewster killed the hired gunmen, Getz himself finished their job and killed their target. The seemingly homeless Getz says he hopes to parlay that false intelligence into a steady job with Seagull.

Getz goes on ahead, while Brewster (now using the name Jim Houston) follows on his quest for vengeance. Brewster soon learns that Seagull, now known as Ken Milton, has used his wealth to acquire a ranch and the services of vicious killer Garcia Mendez (Henry Silva), with whose help he has expanded his holdings by terrorizing other landowners. Brewster also learns that Seagull killed his wife, but finds his young son alive and living nearby as an orphan. The man called Houston gets a job with Mendez (while managing to stay out of sight of his employer "Milton") and, with Getz's help, proceeds to play a double game wherein he rides with Mendez and his killers, but secretly aids their intended victims.

Eventually Brewster, with the help of his son and the surprisingly loyal Getz, confronts and kills Mendez and his men, and eventually Seagull. Afterward Getz reveals himself to be a government agent who had been on Seagull/Milton's trail all along. The government restores all property to its rightful owners, but Getz assures the authorities that the ex-convict Brewster was indeed murdered in the ambush at the empty house, freeing "Houston" to begin a new life with his son.

== Cast ==
- Thomas Hunter as Jerry Brewster
- Henry Silva as Garcia Mendez
- Dan Duryea as Colonel Winny Getz
- Nando Gazzolo as Ken Seagull
- Nicoletta Machiavelli as Mary Ann
- Gianna Serra as Hattie
- Loris Loddi as Tim Brewster
- Geoffrey Copleston as Brian Horner
- Guido Celano as Jonathan Burger, The Blacksmith
- Puccio Ceccarelli as Mendez Henchman
- Guglielmo Spoletini as Pedro
- Mirko Valentin as Sancho
- Jeff Cameron as Randall

== Production ==
The Hills Run Red was shot in Italy and Spain in 1966 with interiors shot at Dino De Laurentiis Studios in Rome and on newly constructed Western town set at Dinocitta.

== Release ==
The Hills Run Red was released in Italy in September 1966.

== Reception ==
From contemporary reviews, "Dool." of Variety noted the film had the "well photographed outdoor action sequences" and that the score was "serviceable" and that the film had "enough action [...] to fill three pix, but [The Hills Run Red] carries on the European tradition of shooting up everyone in sight" and that the film had "limited boxoffice appeal." A review in the Monthly Film Bulletin found the film to be "a rip-roaring variation on the revenge theme, wholly traditional in style but all gutsy action from start to finish." The review went on to note that "even if the dialogue is clumsy and the hero's instinct for survival more than a little improbable, the action more than makes up for it."

From retrospective reviews, Alex Cox in his book 10,000 Ways to Die submits that the film was deliberately meant to evoke the Westerns of Anthony Mann.

== Sources ==
- Hughes, Howard (2004). Once Upon a Time in the Italian West. I. B. Tauris. ISBN 1-85043-430-1.
- Hughes, Howard (2010). Spaghetti Westerns. Harpenden: Kamera Books. ISBN 978-1-84243-303-4.
