= War Is Hell (film) =

1961 film by Burt Topper

War is Hell
- Film poster
- Directed by: Burt Topper
- Written by: Burt Topper
- Produced by: Burt Topper
- Starring: Baynes Barron; Michael Bell
- Narrated by: Audie Murphy
- Cinematography: Jacques Marquette
- Edited by: Ace Herman
- Music by: Ronald Stein
- Distributed by: Allied Artists
- Release date: September 6, 1961 (International release): October 23, 1963; (US release)
- Running time: 81 minutes
- Country: United States
- Language: English

War is Hell is a 1961 American war film written, produced and directed by Burt Topper. The film stars Baynes Barron and Michael Bell and is narrated by Audie Murphy. A featured cast member is Judy Dan.

== Plot ==
The available footage of the film. The full film has not been found.

Set during the Korean War on July 27, 1953, the film depicts the atrocities of battle. Sgt. Garth (Barron), a bloodthirsty egomaniac, neglects to tell his soldiers that there has been a cease fire. The sergeant sends his unit into an enemy bunker, where they are fiercely attacked by the enemy. The few who survive secure the bunker, and Garth attempts to take credit for their actions. Further chaos ensues, resulting in the deaths of many in the platoon, as well as a mortal wound to the sergeant.

== Cast ==
- Baynes Barron as Sergeant Garth
- Michael Bell as Seldon
- Bobby Byles as Gresler
- Wally Campo as Laney
- Kei Thin Chung as Korean Lieutenant (credited as Kei Chung)
- J.J. Dahner as Koller
- Judy Dan as Yung Chi Thomas
- Robert Howard as Connors
- Audie Murphy as The Narrator
- Russ Prescott as Bender
- Tony Rich as Miller
- Tony Russel as Sergeant Keefer
- Paul Sheriff as Thurston
- Burt Topper as Lieutenant Hallen

== Release ==
The film ran in Japan and West Germany in late 1961, sometimes titled War Hero. Its release in the US was delayed, with some of the cast and crew suspecting that distributors were put off by the depiction of an American war criminal. It was finally released in 1963, with Audie Murphy's narration added to soften the film's message, and distributed by United Artists the next year on a double bill below the James Bond film From Russia with Love.

== Legacy ==
War Is Hell has been noted as the last Hollywood Korean War film, coming just as the United States was building its presence in Vietnam. However, its artistic aspects have been overshadowed by the coincidence that it was playing (along with Cry of Battle) at the Texas Theatre in Dallas the afternoon of November 22, 1963, when Lee Harvey Oswald hid there after shooting President John F. Kennedy and police officer J. D. Tippit.
