= Ricardo Blasco =

Spanish writer, screenwriter, and film director

- Born: Ricardo Blasco Laguna; April 30, 1921; Valencia
- Died: February 8, 1994 (aged 72); Madrid
- Occupations: Screenwriter, film and television director, and essayist

Ricardo Blasco Laguna (30 April 1921 – 8 February 1994) was a Spanish writer, screenwriter and film director.

He began his career as screenwriter for Cifesa and then under the direction of Luis Lucia Mingarro. He co-directed Nuits andalouses (1953), by Maurice Cloche, Amor bajo cero (1960), Armas contra la ley (1961), Autopsia de un criminal (1962), Destino: Barajas (1962), Las tres espadas del Zorro (1963) and El Zorro cabalga otra vez (1965). He also worked as screenwriter and television director for Televisión Española in Escuela de matrimonios (1964), Diego de Acevedo (1966), España siglo XX (1973), Sombras del ayer (1979) and Memorias de España (1982).

In his last days he worked as historian and essayist. In 1973 he edited the Gran Enciclopedia de la Región Valenciana.

== Works ==
- Nuits andalouses (1953)
- Amor bajo cero (1960)
- Armas contra la ley (1961)
- Autopsia de un criminal (1962)
- Destino: Barajas (1962)
- Las tres espadas del Zorro (1963)
- El Zorro cabalga otra vez (1965)
- Gran Enciclopedia de la Región Valenciana (1973, editor)

== Bibliography ==
- García Maroto, Eduardo (1988). Aventuras y desventuras del cine español. Barcelona, Plaza y Janés. ISBN 9788401351624.
