= Thomas Hunter (actor) =

American actor

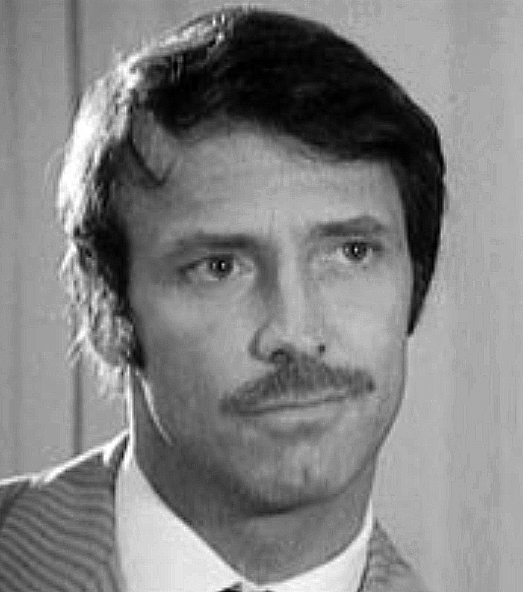
- Born: Thomas O'Driscoll Hunter; December 19, 1932; Savannah, Georgia, U.S.
- Died: December 27, 2017 (aged 85); Norwalk, Connecticut, U.S.
- Occupation: Actor
- Years active: 1966–1984

Thomas O'Driscoll Hunter (December 19, 1932 – December 27, 2017) was an American actor known for work in Spaghetti Westerns and as a Hollywood screenwriter. He was also the founder of the New England Repertory Company.

== Biography ==
Born in Savannah, Georgia, Hunter served in the United States Marine Corps and graduated from the University of Virginia. He studied acting with Sanford Meisner and Uta Hagen.

He entered film in a small role in Blake Edwards' What Did You Do in the War, Daddy? (1966). After completing the film, a chance meeting with Dino De Laurentiis led him to be invited to star as the lead in The Hills Run Red leading him to a career in European - primarily Italian - cinema with guest appearances in American television series. His dissatisfaction with European cinema led him to found the New England Repertory Company.

Hunter published two books. The novel Softly Walks the Beast is an end-of-the-world story that takes place in the not-too-distant future and centers on a dwindling community of smart and resourceful people on a college campus, struggling against the horrible and seemingly unstoppable after-effects of a nuclear war. "Softly Walks the Beast" was first published in 1982 and a second edition was published in 2014.

In 2015, Hunter published his memoir Memoirs of a Spaghetti Cowboy: Tales of Oddball Luck and Derring-Do, which chronicles his adventures starring in numerous Spaghetti Westerns and other foreign productions while living in Rome.

== Filmography ==
=== Screenwriter ===
- The 'Human' Factor (1975)
- The Final Countdown (1980)

=== Actor ===
Year	Title	Role	Director	Notes
1966	What Did You Do in the War, Daddy?	American GI #3	Blake Edwards	
1966	The Hills Run Red	Jerry Brewster / Jim Houston	Carlo Lizzani	
1966	Death Walks in Laredo	Whitey Selby	Enzo Peri	
1967	Love Nights in the Taiga	Frank Heller	Harald Philipp	
1968	Anzio	Pvt. Andy	Edward Dmytryk	
1968	The Magnificent Tony Carrera	Tony Carrera	José Antonio de la Loma	
1969	Battle of the Commandos	Capt. Kevin Burke	Umberto Lenzi	
1969	Revenge	Richard Marlowe	Pino Tosini	
1971	The Vampire Happening	Internatslehrer Jens Larsen	Freddie Francis	
1971	Madness - Gli occhi della luna		Cesare Rau	
1971	X312 - Flight to Hell	Tom Nilson	Jesús Franco	
1971	Il sorriso del ragno		Massimo Castellani	
1971	Carlos	Pedro	Hans W. Geißendörfer	TV movie
1971	Equinozio		Maurizio Ponzi	
1973	Night Flight from Moscow		Henri Verneuil	
1974	Wer stirbt schon gerne unter Palmen	Werner Becker	Alfred Vohrer	
1975	The 'Human' Factor	Taylor	Edward Dmytryk	
1976	The Cassandra Crossing	Captain Scott	George P. Cosmatos	
1976	Cross Shot	Turrini	Stelvio Massi	
1983	The Act	The John	Sig Shore	(final film role)
