= Wild, Wild Planet =

- Italian: I Criminali della Galassia
- Directed by: Antonio Margheriti
- Written by: Ivan Reiner; Renato Moretti; Francesco Benedetti
- Produced by: Joseph Fryd; Antonio Margheriti
- Starring: Tony Russel; Lisa Gastoni; Massimo Serato; Carlo Giustini; Enzo Fiermonte
- Cinematography: Riccardo Pallottini
- Edited by: Otello Colangeli
- Music by: Angelo Francesco Lavagnino
- Production companies: Mercury Film International; Southern Cross
- Distributed by: Titanus
- Release date: 10 June 1966 (Trieste)
- Running time: 93 minutes
- Country: Italy

Wild, Wild Planet (Italian: I Criminali della Galassia, lit. 'Criminals of the Galaxy') is a 1966 Italian science fiction film directed by Antonio Margheriti and starring Tony Russel, Lisa Gastoni, Massimo Serato, Carlo Giustini, Franco Nero and Enzo Fiermonte. It is the first film of Margheriti's Gamma One series, and was released in Italy by Titanus on June 10, 1966.

== Plot ==
In 2015, Commander Mike Halstead, commander of space station Gamma One of the United Democracies Space Command, is assigned to investigate the alarming number of missing person reports on Earth.

Dr. Nurmi is engaged in secret bio-engineering experiments on the same base as Halstead, which causes an issue for Halstead, who disapproves of the experiments. While Nurmi's assignment is to study miniaturization of human organs, he starts kidnapping influential world leaders for use in his eugenics program. Nurmi is actually working for the planet Delphos, using four armed androids to assist in the kidnapping and is transporting the miniaturized world leader to Delphos.

Halstead confronts Nurmi over his suspicions of illegal experiments but is confined to quarters by his superiors. Lieutenants Jake and Ken free him.

Nurmi seduces Halstead's girlfriend, Lieutenant Connie Gomez. Nurmi wants to use Gomez in his experiments to build a genetically perfect, immortal race of humans. Halstead comes to the rescue in outer space.

== Cast ==
- Tony Russel as Cmdr. Mike Halstead
- Lisa Gastoni as Lt. Connie Gomez
- Massimo Serato as Mr. Nurmi
- Carlo Giustini as Lt. Ken
- Franco Nero as Lt. Jake Jacowitz
- Enzo Fiermonte as General Paul H. Fowler
- Umberto Raho as General Maitland
- Aldo D'Ambrosio as Dr. Anton Fryd
  - Franco Doria as shrunken Fryd
- Margherita Horowitz as Mrs. Fowler
- Carlo Kechler as Werner
- Rodolfo Lodi as Claridge
- Renato Montalbano as Detective Manning
- Franco Ressel as Lt. Jeffries
- Victoria Zinny as Vicky Halstead
- Vittorio Bonos as Delfos Scientist
- Aldo Canti as Gymnasium Victim
- Moa Tahi as Lead Abductor
- Goffredo Unger as Charles De Lauty
- Archie Savage as Dancer

== Production ==
Wild, Wild Planet is the first of four "Gamma One" science fiction films directed by Antonio Margheriti. They were originally contracted by Metro-Goldwyn-Mayer to be made-for-TV movies, but were released theatrically instead in some countries. The films were shot consecutively, often reusing the same sets and actors, on-location in Rome and at De Paolis Studios.

== Release ==
Wild, Wild Planet was released in Italy in 1966, where it was distributed by Titanus. It opened in New York on August 9, 1967. As of January 2021, the movie is available to rent from many services, including Amazon and YouTube. It was released on DVD in 2010.

The English translation of the original title was The Galaxy Criminals, but it was changed for release in the United States in hopes of capitalizing on the then-popular TV show The Wild Wild West.

== Reception ==
Moria found the movie to have a fun, schlocky plot and a colorful bizarreness, but found the direction lacking and the movie ultimately dull. TV Guide found the movie fun but the acting wooden. Creature Feature gave the movie one star, finding it dull. Turner Classic Movies found the campy movie fun, with much of the dialogue and special effects unintentionally funny.

The Encyclopedia of Science Fiction found the premise and set up to be interesting, but that the movie fails to live up to its promise. It further found the space sequences good, but the Earth-bound portion of the story dull and the plans and motivations of Nurmi absurd.

The Buffalo Courier-Express found the film "a wilder than a wild stretch of the imagination, and a poor one at that.... Aside from some interesting backgrounds and props, it hasn't much to offer except to the staunchest of science-fiction fans. A confused plot involves the rivalry between world and planetary governments."

== See also ==
- List of films featuring miniature people
