= List of Italian films of 1965 =

A list of films produced in Italy in 1965 (see 1965 in film):

Italian films released in 1965
Title	Director	Cast	Genre	Notes
002 Operazione Luna	Lucio Fulci	Franco and Ciccio, Mónica Randall and Linda Sini	Comedy	
100.000 dollari per Ringo	Alberto De Martino	Richard Harrison, Fernando Sancho, Mónica Randall	Western	Italian–Spanish co-production
2+5: Missione Hydra	Pietro Francisci	Leonora Ruffo, Mario Novelli	Science Fiction	
The 10th Victim	Elio Petri	Marcello Mastroianni, Ursula Andress, Elsa Martinelli	Science Fiction	
13 Days to Die				
30 Winchester per El Diablo	Gianfranco Baldanello	Carl Möhner, Alessandra Panaro, Ivano Staccioli	Western	
A 001, operazione Giamaica	Ernst R. von Theumer/Mel Welles	Larry Pennell, Roberto Camardiel, Barbara Valentin, Linda Sini, John Bartha	Action spy	
A 008, operazione Sterminio	Umberto Lenzi	Ingrid Schoeller, Alberto Lupo, Dina De Santis, Ivano Staccioli, Mark Trevor	Action spy	
Adiós gringo	Giorgio Stegani	Giuliano Gemma, Ida Galli, Nello Pazzafini	Western	Italian–French–Spanish co-production
Agente 077 dall'oriente con furore	Sergio Grieco	Ken Clark, Margaret Lee, Fabienne Dali. Evi Marandi, Philippe Hersent	Action spy parody	
Agente 077 missione Bloody Mary	Sergio Grieco	Ken Clark, Helga Liné, Philippe Hersent, Umberto Raho, Silvana Jachino	Action spy parody	
Agente 3S3: Passaporto per l'inferno	Sergio Sollima	George Ardisson, Barbara Simon, José Marco, Georges Rivière	Spy adventure	
Agente S 03: Operazione Atlantide	Domenico Paolella	John Ericson, Bernardina Sarrocco, Cristina Gaioni, María Granada, Carlo Hinterman	Action/spy crime	
Agente segreto 777 - Operazione Mistero	Enrico Bomba	Mark Damon, Mary Young, Seyna Seyn, Stelio Candelli, Aldo Bufi Landi	Spy adventure	
Agente X 1-7 operación Océano	Tanio Boccia	Lang Jeffries	Spy adventure	
Agente Z 55 missione disperata	Roberto Bianchi Montero	Germán Cobos, Yoko Tani	Spy adventure	
All'ombra di una colt	Giovanni Grimaldi	Stephen Forsyth, Conrado San Martín, Anna Maria Polani, Helga Liné, Franco Ressel, Aldo Sambrell, José Calvo	Western	
Altissima pressione	Enzo Trapani	Dino, Gianni Morandi, Rosemary Dexter, Fabrizio Capucci, Lucio Dalla	Musical	
Gli amanti latini	Mario Costa	Totò, Aldo Giuffrè	Comedy	Film consists of segments
Amore all'italiana	Steno	Walter Chiari, Raimondo Vianello, Paolo Panelli, Paolo Carlini, Vivi Bach	Comedy	
Un amore	Gianni Vernuccio	Rossano Brazzi, Agnès Spaak, Gérard Blain, Marisa Merlini	Romance	
L'antimiracolo	Ellio Piccon		Documentary	
Appunti per un film sul Jazz				
L'Arme à gauche				
Assassinio made in Italy				
Aventuras del Oeste				
Le avventure di topo Gigio				
L'avventuriero della tortuga				
Le bambole	Mauro Bolognini, Luigi Comencini, Dino Risi, Franco Rossi	Virna Lisi, Nino Manfredi, Gina Lollobrigida, Elke Sommer, Monica Vitti	Commedia all'italiana	
Una bella grinta	Giuliano Montaldo			Entered into the 15th Berlin International Film Festival
Berlino - Appuntamento per le spie				
Black Eagle of Santa Fe	Ernst Hofbauer	Brad Harris, Joachim Hansen, Horst Frank	Western	German–Italian–French co-production
Blood for a Silver Dollar	Giorgio Ferroni	Giuliano Gemma, Ida Galli, Pierre Cressoy	Western	Italian–French co-production
Bloody Pit of Horror	Massimo Pupillo	Mickey Hargitay, Walter Bigari, Luisa Baratto	Horror	
Les Bons Vivants				
La bugiarda				
Cadavere a spasso				
Canadian Wilderness	Amando de Ossorio	George Martin, Giulia Rubini, Diana Lorys	Western	Spanish–Italian co-production
Casanova 70	Mario Monicelli	Marcello Mastroianni, Virna Lisi	Commedia all'italiana	Academy Award nominee for Best Script. 2 Awards at San Sebastián Film Festival
La Celestina P... R...				
Cent briques et des tuiles				
Ces dames s'en mêlent				
Le Chant du monde				
A Coffin for the Sheriff	Mario Caiano	Anthony Steffen, Eduardo Fajardo, George Rigaud	Western	Italian–Spanish co-production
Colorado Charlie	Roberto Mauri	Jacques Berthier, Brunella Bovo, Livio Lorenzon	Western	
La colpa e la pena				
The Colt is My Law	Alfonso Brescia	Ángel del Pozo, Luciana Gilli, Miguel de la Riva	Western	Italian–Spanish co-production
Come inguaiammo l'esercito				
Comizi d'amore				
Il compagno Don Camillo				
I complessi				
Con il cuore fermo Sicilia				
Con rispetto parlando				
La congiuntura				
Il conquistatore di Atlantide				
Coplan FX 18 casse tout				
Le Corniaud				
I criminali della galassia				
Cristo in India				
Da Istanbul ordine di uccidere				
La Dama de Beirut				
Desafío en Río Bravo				
The Desperado Trail	Harald Reinl	Pierre Brice, Lex Barker, Rik Battaglia	Western	German–Italian–Yugoslavian co-production
El Diablo también llora				
The Dirty Game				
Doc, Hands of Steel	Alfonso Balcázar	Carl Möhner, Luis Davila, Gloria Milland	Western	Spanish–Italian co-production
Un dollaro bucato				
The Possessed (1965 film) / La donna del lago	Luigi Bazzoni		mystery	
La donnaccia				
Due mafiosi contro Goldginger				
Due mafiosi nel Far West				
Due marines e un generale				
I due parà				
I due toreri				
Duel at Sundown	Leopold Lahola	Peter van Eyck, Carole Gray, Wolfgang Kieling	Western	German–Yugoslavian–Italian co-production
The Duke's Gold	Jacques Baratier	Claude Rich, Elsa Martinelli, Danielle Darrieux	Comedy	Co-production with France
Déclic et des claques				
E venne un uomo				
The Embalmer	Dino Tavella	Maureen Lidgard Brown, Gino Marturano, Alcide Gazzotto	—N/a	
Erik, il vichingo				
Furia à Bahia pour OSS 117				
Gli eroi del West				
Gli eroi di Fort Worth				
Estambul 65				
La Fabuleuse aventure de Marco Polo				
Fall of the Mohicans	Mateo Cano	Jack Taylor, Sara Lezana, Daniel Martin	Western	Spanish–Italian co-production
Fango sulla metropoli				
Fantômas se déchaîne				
I figli del leopardo				
Fists in the Pocket	Marco Bellocchio	Lou Castel, Paola Pitagora	Drama	
For a Few Dollars More	Sergio Leone	Clint Eastwood, Lee Van Cleef, Gian Maria Volonté	Western	Italian–Spanish–West German co-production
For a Fist in the Eye	Michele Lupo	Franco and Ciccio, Francisco Morán	Western	Italian–Spanish co-production
Il Gaucho	Dino Risi	Vittorio Gassman, Nino Manfredi	Comedy	
Le Gentleman de Cocody				
Il gladiatore che sfidò l'impero				
Gli uomini dal passo pesante	Albert Band, Mario Sequi	Gordon Scott, Joseph Cotten, James Mitchum	Western	Italian–French co-production
Il grande colpo dei sette uomini d'oro				
Gideon and Samson/I grandi condottieri				
Le guide del Cervino				
Hands of a Gunfighter	Rafael Romero Marchent	Craig Hill, Gloria Milland, Carlos Romero Marchent	Western	Spanish–Italian co-production
Heaven on One's Head (Le Ciel sur la tête)				
Hercules and the Princess of Troy				
I complessi	Dino Risi, Luigi Filippo D'Amico, Franco Rossi	Nino Manfredi, Ugo Tognazzi, Alberto Sordi	Commedia all'italiana	Film with 3 episodes
Idoli controluce				
L'incendio di Roma				
Invasione			Short subject	
In a Colt's Shadow	Giovanni Grimaldi	Stephen Forsyth, Conrado San Martín, Franco Ressel	Western	Italian–Spanish co-production
Io la conoscevo bene	Antonio Pietrangeli	Stefania Sandrelli, Ugo Tognazzi, Nino Manfredi	Commedia all'italiana	3 Nastro d'Argento
Io uccido, tu uccidi				
Italiani brava gente				
James Tont operazione D.U.E.				
James Tont operazione U.N.O.				
Je vous salue, mafia!				
Jesse James' Kid	Antonio del Amo	Claudio Undari, Mercedes Alonso, Raf Baldassarre	Western	Spanish–Italian co-production
Joe Dexter	Ignacio F. Iquino	George Martin, Adriana Ambesi, Katia Loritz	Western	Spanish–Italian co-production
Le Journal d'une femme en blanc				
Juliet of the Spirits	Federico Fellini	Giulietta Masina, Sandra Milo, Valentina Cortese, Sylva Koscina	Fellini's fantasy	2 Academy Award nominations
Lady L				
Lady Morgan's Vengeance	Massimo Pupillo	Gordon Mitchell, Erika Blanc	Horror	
The Last Tomahawk	Harald Reinl	Daniel Martin, Anthony Steffen, Joachim Fuchsberger	Western	German–Spanish–Italian co-production
Left Handed Johnny West	Gianfranco Parolini	Mimmo Palmara, Adriano Micantoni, Dada Gallotti	Western	Italian–Spanish–French co-production
Letti sbagliati				
Die letzten Drei der Albatros				
Libido				
Liebe per Inserat				
Le Lit à deux places				
Legacy of the Incas	Georg Marischka	Guy Madison, Rik Battaglia, Heinz Erhardt	Adventure	Co-production with Spain and West Germany
Loca juventud				
Made in Italy				
La magnifica sfida				
Il magnifico cornuto				
The Majordomo	Jean Delannoy	Paul Meurisse, Geneviève Page, Paul Hubschmid	Comedy	Co-production with France
La Mandragola				
Man Called Gringo	Roy Rowland	Götz George, Daniel Martin, Alexandra Stewart	Western	Spanish–German–Italian co-production
Man from Canyon City	Alfonso Balcázar	Fernando Sancho, Robert Woods, Luis Davila	Western	Spanish–Italian co-production
Marc Mato, agente S. 077				
Marcia nuziale				
Marie-Chantal contre le docteur Kha				
Marvelous Angelique	Bernard Borderie	Michèle Mercier, Jean Rochefort, Claude Giraud	Historical adventure	Co-production France and West Germany
Menage all'italiana				
Minnesota Clay	Sergio Corbucci	Cameron Mitchell, Fernando Sancho, Ethel Rojo	Spaghetti Western	
Misión Lisboa			Spy	Co-production with Spain and France
Mission spéciale à Caracas				
Missione mortale Molo 83				
Il mistero dell'isola maledetta				
Una moglie americana				
Moi et les hommes de 40 ans				
Il momento della verità	Francesco Rosi			Entered into the 1965 Cannes Film Festival
La montagna di luce				
Il morbidone				
La Métamorphose des cloportes				
Nick Carter et le trèfle rouge				
Nightmare Castle	Mario Caiano	Barbara Steele, Paul Muller, Helga Liné, Giuseppe Addobbati	Horror	
Non son degno di te				
Le notti della violenza				
Nude, calde e pure				
Nudo, crudo e...				
Ocaso de un pistolero				
The Man, the Woman and the Money (Oggi, domani, dopodomani)	Eduardo De Filippo, Marco Ferreri, Luciano Salce	Marcello Mastroianni, Catherine Spaak, Virna Lisi, Pamela Tiffin, Luciano Salce	Commedia all'italiana	Film with 3 episodes
Oklahoma John				
Operazione Goldman	Antonio Margheriti	Anthony Eisley	Eurospy	
Operazione poker		Roger Browne	Eurospy	
Un' Ora prima di Amleto, più Pinocchio				
OSS 77 - Operazione fior di loto			Eurospy	
Il padre selvaggio				
Par un beau matin d'été				
Pas question le samedi				
Passeport diplomatique agent K 8				
Per un dollaro a Tucson si muore	Cesare Canevari	Ronny de Marc, Joco Turk, Gia Sandri	Western	
Per una manciata d'oro				
Perché uccidi ancora	Jose Antonio de la Loma, Edoardo Mulargia	Anthony Steffen, Ida Galli, Aldo Berti	Western	Spanish–Italian co-production
Los Pianos mecánicos (The Uninhibited)				
Pierrot le fou				
Il piombo e la carne				
Los Pistoleros de Arizona				
Piège pour Cendrillon				
I predoni del Sahara				
Processioni in Sicilia				
I quattro inesorabili				
The Pyramid of the Sun God	Roberto Siodmak	Lex Barker, Gérard Barray, Rik Battaglia	Western	German–French–Italian co-production
Questa volta parliamo di uomini				
Questi pazzi, pazzi italiani				
Una questione d'onore	Luigi Zampa			Entered into the 16th Berlin International Film Festival
Questo pazzo, pazzo mondo della canzone				
La ragazzola				
Red Dragon				
The Relentless Four	Primo Zeglio	Adam West, Claudio Undari, Renato Rossini	Western	Italian–Spanish co-production
Rita, la figlia americana				
The Return of Ringo	Duccio Tessari	Giuliano Gemma, Fernando Sancho, George Martin	Western	Italian–Spanish co-production
Rivincita di Ivanhoe				
Salome '73				
Lo sceriffo che non spara				
Shots in Threequarter Time	Alfred Weidenmann			
Lo scippo				
Se non avessi più te				
Le sedicenni				
Serenade for Two Spies				
Sette contro tutti				
Sette uomini d'oro				
Seven Hours of Gunfire	Joaquin Romero Marchent	Rik Van Nutter, Adrian Hoven, Gloria Milland	Western	Spanish–Italian–German co-production
The Seventh Grave	Garibaldi Serra Caracciolo	Stefania Menchinelli, Nando Angelini, Armando Guarnieri	—N/a	
Guns of Nevada	Ignacio F. Iquino	George Martin		
La sfida dei giganti				
Slalom				
The Camp Followers	Valerio Zurlini	Tomas Milian, Anna Karina	War Drama	
Soldati e caporali				
I soldi				
Solo contro tutti				
Sopralluoghi in Palestina per il vangelo secondo Matteo				
Una spada per l'impero				
Spiaggia libera				
Le spie uccidono a Beirut				
Stranger in Sacramento	Sergio Bergonzelli	Mickey Hargitay, Barbara Frey, Gabriella Giorgelli	Western	
Su e giù				
La suora giovane				
Superseven chiama Cairo				
I tabù n. 2				
Un tango dalla Russia				
Te lo leggo negli occhi				
Tentazioni proibite				
Terror-Creatures from the Grave	Massimo Pupillo	Barbara Steele, Walter Brandi, Mirella Maravidi	Horror	Italian–American co-production
Planet of the Vampires	Mario Bava	Barry Sullivan, Norma Bengell	Horror, Science Fiction	
Il tesoro della foresta pietrificata				
Thrilling				
Le Tonnerre de Dieu				
Train d'enfer	Gilles Grangier	Jean Marais, Marisa Mell, Howard Vernon	Spy film	
La Traite des blanches				
I tre volti				
The Treasure of the Aztecs	Robert Siodmak	Lex Barker, Gérard Barray, Michele Giardon	Western	German–French–Italian co-production
Tres dólares de plomo				
Les Tribulations d'un chinois en Chine				
The Two Orphans	Riccardo Freda	Mike Marshall, Valeria Ciangottini, Sophie Darès	—N/a	French–Italian co-production
Two Sergeants of General Custer	Giorgio Simonelli	Franco and Ciccio, Margaret Lee	Western	Italian–Spanish co-production
Umorismo in nero				
Un milliard dans un billard				
Uncle Tom's Cabin				
L'uomo che viene da Canyon City				
L'uomo dei cinque palloni				
L'uomo di Toledo				
Vaghe stelle dell'Orsa	Luchino Visconti	Claudia Cardinale, Jean Sorel, Michael Craig	Drama	Golden Lion winner
Le Vampire de Düsseldorf				
Il vendicatore dei Mayas				
Veneri al sole				
La verifica incerta				
Via Veneto				
Viale della canzone				
La violenza dei dannati				
Viva Maria!	Louis Malle	Brigitte Bardot, Jeanne Moreau, George Hamilton	Western	French–Italian co-production
Una voglia da morire				
West and soda				
Zoom su Federico Fellini				
E Zorro cabalga otra vez				

== See also ==
- 1965 in Italian television
