= 1965 in Italy =

- Decades: 1940s; 1950s; 1960s; 1970s; 1980s
- See also: History of Italy; Timeline of Italian history; List of years in Italy

Events in the year 1965 in Italy.

== Incumbents ==
- President - Giuseppe Saragat
- Prime Minister – Aldo Moro

== Events ==
- 12 May – The liner SS Michelangelo enters service.
- 28 December – Foreign Minister Amintore Fanfani resigns, following the publication of an outspoken interview.

=== Sport ===
==== Basketball ====
- 1964–65 Serie A (basketball)
- 1965–66 Serie A (basketball)

==== Cycling ====
- 1965 Giro d'Italia
- 1965 UCI Road World Championships

==== Football ====
- 1964–65 Serie A
- 1965–66 Serie A
- 1964–65 Serie B
- 1965–66 Serie B

==== Motor racing ====
- 1972 Italian Grand Prix

== Births ==
- 9 April – Paola Tovaglia, children's television personality (d. 1994)
- 7 June – Emanuela Pacotto, voice actress
- 24 June – Vladimir Luxuria, trans actress, writer, politician and television host
- 1 July – Oscar Pelliccioli, cyclist and cycling manager
- 16 July – Gianni Faresin, road bicycle racer
- 24 November – Luigi Alberto Franzoni, university professor

== Deaths ==
- 13 March
  - Corrado Gini, statistician (b. 1884)
  - Vittorio Jano, automobile designer (b. 1891)

== See also ==
- 1965 in Italian television
- List of Italian films of 1965
