= Latini (surname) =

Latini is an Italian surname. It is the Classical Latin and Italian cognate for Latins.

== Geographical distribution ==
As of 2014, 76.5% of all known bearers of the surname Latini were residents of Italy (frequency 1:5,211), 7.3% of Brazil (1:182,112), 6.7% of the United States (1:352,784) and 5.6% of Argentina (1:50,110).

In Italy, the frequency of the surname was higher than the national average (1:5,211) in the following regions:

1. Marche (1:533)
2. Umbria (1:894)
3. Lazio (1:1,030)
4. Tuscany (1:3,216)

== People ==
- Antonio Latini (1642–1692), Italian chef
- Brunetto Latini (1220–1294), Italian philosopher, scholar and statesman
- Franco Latini (1927–1991), Italian actor and voice actor
- Ilaria Latini (born 1972), Italian voice actress
- Laura Latini (1969–2012), Italian voice actress
- Latino Latini (1513–1593), Italian scholar and humanist of the Renaissance
- Manoela Latini Gavassi Francisco (1993—), Brazilian singer, songwriter and actress
