= Latini (disambiguation) =

The Latini were an Italic tribe.

Latini may also refer to:

- Latini (surname), an Italian surname
- Latini, Forčići, a hamlet of Forčići, Croatia
