= May God Forgive You... But I Won't =

1968 film

- Directed by: Vincenzo Musolino
- Written by: Vincenzo Musolino
- Starring: George Ardisson
- Cinematography: Mario Mancini
- Music by: Felice Di Stefano
- Release date: 1968
- Country: Italy
- Language: Italian

May God Forgive You... But I Won't (Italian: Chiedi perdono a Dio… non a me) is a 1968 Italian Spaghetti Western film written and directed by Vincenzo Musolino.

== Plot ==
Cjamango's entire family has been exterminated and he decides to take revenge, (helped by a Mexican who saw the bandits). In the way Cjamango learns that it was his father-in-law that had armed the bandits to avenge himself of some disgrace he had suffered in the form of Cjamango's past.

== Cast ==
- George Ardisson as Django / Cjamango McDonald
- Dragomir Bojanić as Dick Smart (credited as "Anthony Ghidra")
- Peter Martell as Jack Smart
- Cristina Iosani as Virginia Stuart
- Dante Maggio as Bartender
- Luigi Pavese as Stuart
- Ignazio Spalla as Barrica (credited as "Pedro Sanchez")
- Lilli Lembo as Dick's Friend
- Franco Pesce as an Undertaker
- Franco Latini as an Undertaker
- Antonio Di Mitri as Manuel (credited as "George Stevenson")
- Tano Cimarosa as a Bandit
