= Agente Segreto 070: Thunderbay Missione Grasshopper =

- Original film poster
- Directed by: Burton van Hooven
- Written by: John Griffith (story and screenplay); Edgar Arkoff; Hilde Weiss
- Cinematography: Ernest John Mercury
- Music by: Italo Fischetti
- Release date: 1966
- Running time: 80 minutes
- Country: Italy
- Language: Italian

Agente Segreto 070: Thunderbay Missione Grasshopper is a black-and-white 1966 Italian spy comedy film directed by Burton van Hooven, a possible alias of Cesare Canevari. It is a parody of James Bond's Thunderball and a sequel to Un tango dalla Russia (1965) with Dan Christian repeating his role as Agente 070.

== Premise ==
Dan Cooper is assigned to investigate the murder of a colleague. The trail leads to a gang of diamond smugglers.

== Cast ==
- Dan Christian as Agent 070 Dan Cooper
- Vasna Welsh as Secret Agent
- Roberto Messina (credited as Bob Messenger) as Sergeant Bear
- Mills Mason as Paco
- Ursula Kent as Rossabella
- Lolita Ritz as Regina
- Attilio Dottesio as the director

== Reception ==
Italian film critic Marco Giusti described the film as "even more foolish" than its first chapter and "unwatchable".
