= Maria Laura Rocca =

Italian actress and writer

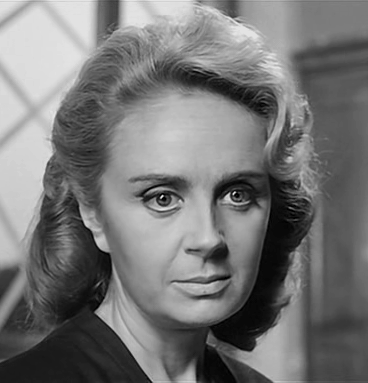
- Rocca in Gold of Rome (1961)
- Born: Maria Laura Gayno; 5 October 1917; Pasian di Prato, Italy
- Died: 6 May 1999 (aged 81); Rome, Italy
- Occupation: Actress

Maria Laura Rocca (5 October 1917 – 6 May 1999) was an Italian actress and writer.

== Life and career ==
Born Maria Laura Gayno in Pasian di Prato, Udine, Rocca spent her adolescence in Genoa, her mother's birthplace. After acting in some amateur dramatics, she studied drama under Teresa Franchini, with whom she also made her professional debut on stage at 30 years old. In films, she was mainly active in supporting roles in adventure and peplum genres, sometimes credited as Manuela Kent. She retired from acting in the mid-1960s. In 1959, she was the author of the book Cina senza muraglia, and in 1969, she wrote the film Mr. Superinvisible, being credited as Mary Eller.

== Personal life ==
In 1939, Rocca married Giuseppe Bisazza, and they had a son, Oreste. In 1948, she remarried Communist politician Umberto Terracini.

Rocca died in a clinic in Rome, following a long illness, in 1999, at 81 years old.

== Selected filmography ==
- Attention! Bandits! (1951)
- Article 519, Penal Code (1952)
- At the Edge of the City (1953)
- For You I Have Sinned (1953)
- Love Song (1954)
- Love in Rome (1960)
- Gold of Rome (1961)
- The Fury of Achilles (1962)
- Imperial Venus (1962)
- The Fall of Rome (1963)
- Secret of the Sphinx (1964)
- Messalina vs. the Son of Hercules (1964)
- Lo scippo (1965)
- Captain from Toledo (1965)
