= The Fall of Rome (film) =

- Directed by: Anthony Dawson
- Screenplay by: Gianni Astolfi; Mauro Mancini; Anthony Dawson
- Produced by: Marco Vicario
- Starring: Carl Möhner; Loredana Nusciak; Jim Dolen; Laura Rocca
- Edited by: Renato Cinquini
- Music by: Riz Ortolani
- Production company: Atlantica Cinematografica
- Release date: February 28, 1963 (Italy)
- Running time: 89 minutes
- Country: Italy

The Fall of Rome (Italian: Il crollo di Roma) is a 1963 Italian peplum film written and directed by Anthony Dawson.

== Plot ==
Immediately following the death of Constantine, the proconsul Junio resumed the persecutions against Christians. Among them is the centurion Mark, who manages to escape arrest and, together with her sister Licia, sets out on a journey to the consul Gaius. Attacked by soldiers of Valerio, Marco is saved with the help of a barbarian tribe, but loses Licia. Junio promises to Marco that all Christians will be freed if he agrees to fight in the arena and manages to defeat all his opponents. Accompanied by Svetla, a girl barbarian, Marco fights and returns freedom to Christians, but suddenly an earthquake strikes.

== Cast ==
- Carl Möhner as Marco
- Loredana Nusciak as Svetla
- Andrea Aureli as Rako
- Ida Galli as Licia
- Piero Palermini as Valerio
- Giancarlo Sbragia as Giunio
- Nando Tamberlani as Matteo
- Maria Grazia Buccella as Xenia
- Jim Dolen as Caio
- Richard Ricci as Tullio
- Maria Laura Rocca as Tullio's mother
- Renato Terra

== Release ==
Fall of Rome was released in Italy on February 28, 1963.

== Reception ==
The Monthly Film Bulletin stated that outside "picturesque outdoor scenery" and "quite a lot of spectacular destruction", the film was otherwise "a completely routine affair", noting that the story comes to a complete halt when Marcus achieves victory in the arena.
