= Adiós gringo =

1965 film by Giorgio Stegani

- Italian theatrical release poster
- Directed by: Giorgio Stegani
- Screenplay by: Giorgio Stegani; José Luis Jerez; Michèle Villerot
- Story by: Giorgio Stegani
- Starring: Giuliano Gemma; Ida Galli; Nello Pazzafini; Roberto Camardiel; Pierre Cressoy
- Cinematography: Francisco Sempere
- Edited by: Jacqueline Brachet
- Music by: Benedetto Ghiglia
- Production companies: Dorica Film; Explorer Film '58; Fono Roma, Coop; Trébol Films; Films Corona
- Distributed by: Euro International Films
- Release date: December 1965
- Countries: Italy; France; Spain
- Box office: $2.1 million (Italy)

Adiós gringo is a 1965 colour Spaghetti Western film directed by Giorgio Stegani. It stars Giuliano Gemma and was co produced between Italy, Spain and France. A major success in Italy, it was the 4th highest grossing Italian picture of the year.

== Plot ==
Brett Landers, a cowboy, buys cattle from his friend Gil Clawson for his ranch but gets falsely accused of theft. In self-defense, he kills his accuser and faces a lynch mob. Escaping with his gun, Brett vows to return and find the real thief. On his journey, he encounters Lucy, a girl kidnapped and tortured during a stagecoach attack.

Despite helping Lucy, Brett faces suspicion in the nearest town as the real culprits are still at large. Lucy identifies the thieves, including Gil Clawson. One of them, Avery Ranchester, is the son of influential Clayton Ranchester. The trio tries to silence Lucy, kidnapping Brett to stage an escape. Brett escapes, kills one bandit, and flees with Lucy.

Back in town, Clayton Ranchester turns the crowd against Brett. With help from the sheriff and town doctor, Brett and Lucy escape, sparking a mountain manhunt. Lucy, forced to kill Gil, loses the only witness to clear Brett. Brett captures Avery, who still has stolen money. Lucy accuses Avery of her torment, leading to Brett's exoneration from cattle theft.

== Cast ==
- Giuliano Gemma as Brent Landers
- Evelyn Stewart as Lucy Tillson
- Nello Pazzafini as Gil Clawson
- Pierre Cressoy as Clayton Ranchester
- Germano Longo as Stan Clevenger
- Massimo Righi as Avery Ranchester
- Robert Camardiel as Dr. Barfield
- Francisco Brana as Ranchester cowboy
- Osiride Peverello as Ranchester cowboy
- Jesús Puente as Sheriff Tex Slaughter
- Monique Saint Claire as Maude Clevenger

== Release ==
Adiós gringo was released in 1965. On its domestic release in Italy, Adiós gringo was the fourth highest-grossing film of the year. Stuart Byron of Variety commented on the audience reaction to the film at a 22nd street grind house screening in New York who were laughing at the film more than enjoying it.

== Reception ==
From contemporary reviews, Stuart Byron of Variety stated the film was the "perhaps the most implausible and contrived" of Italian Westerns.

V. Bassoli in "L'Avvenire d'Italia" in February 1966 wrote that the director "had made the best of the elements he had at hand, creating a film perhaps a little harsh but full of emotions and findings, making thus a good use of Harry Whittington's novel".

== See also ==
- List of Italian films of 1965
