= Un tango dalla Russia =

- Original film poster
- Directed by: Berwang Ross
- Written by: Enrico Gozzo, Cornelius Monk
- Release date: 1965
- Running time: 80 minutes
- Country: Italy
- Language: Italian

Un tango dalla Russia, also known as Agente segreto 070 - Un tango dalla Russia, is a black-and white 1965 Italian spy comedy film. It is a parody of James Bond's From Russia with Love. The direction has often been credited to Cesare Canevari, an allegation which he strongly denied.

== Cast ==
- Dan Christian as Charles Duff, Agente 070
- Britt Semand as Evelyn
- Seyna Seyn as Katya
- Liv Ferrer
- Gara Granda
- Attilio Dottesio as Fred
- Don Testal
- Mark Tessier

== Reception ==
Marco Giusti described the film as "extremely low budget", with the main actor Dan Christian being "unique in his inexpressiveness". The film is said to have had a very limited distribution and to "have been edited (by whom?) in a way that makes it almost unintelligible".

== Sequel ==
The film had a sequel, Agente Segreto 070: Thunderbay Missione Grasshopper.
