= Requiem for a Gringo =

1968 film by Eugenio Martín, José Luis Merino

- Spanish theatrical release poster
- Directed by: Eugenio Martín; José Luis Merino
- Written by: Enrico Colombo; Giuliana Garavaglia
- Starring: Lang Jeffries
- Cinematography: Mario Pacheco
- Edited by: José Antonio Rojo
- Music by: Angelo Francesco Lavagnino
- Production companies: Hispamer Films; Prodimex Film
- Distributed by: Variety Distribution
- Release dates: 23 August 1968 (Italy); 28 April 1969 (Madrid)
- Running time: 95 minutes
- Countries: Italy; Spain
- Languages: Italian; Spanish

Requiem for a Gringo (Italian: Requiem per un gringo, Spanish: Réquiem para el gringo, also known as Duel in the Eclipse) is a 1968 Italian-Spanish Spaghetti Western film directed by Eugenio Martín and José Luis Merino and starring Lang Jeffries, Fernando Sancho and Femi Benussi. It is most known for the gore and psychedelic elements. It is the only western film of the Eurospy and peplum film genre star Lang Jeffries. The film is partially based on Masaki Kobayashi's film Harakiri.

== Plot ==
Spaghetti Western starring Lang Jeffries. A man with special knowledge of the heavens looks to avenge his brother's murder. He targets a gang of Mexican bandits who have occupied a hacienda and picks the day of an eclipse to bring his plan to fruition.

== Cast ==
- Lang Jeffries as Ross Logan / Django
- Femi Benussi as Alma (as Femy Benussi)
- Fernando Sancho as Porfirio Carranza
- Carlo Gaddi as Ted Corbin
- Rubén Rojo as Tom Leader
- Carlo Simoni as Dan
- Aldo Sambrell as Charley Fair
- Marisa Paredes as Nina
- Giuliana Garavaglia as Lupe (as Giuly Garr)
- Ángel Álvarez as Samuel
