= Blood for a Silver Dollar =

1965 film by Giorgio Ferroni

- Directed by: Calvin Jackson Padget
- Screenplay by: George Finley
- Story by: Calvin Jackson Padget; George Finley
- Starring: Montgomery Wood; Evelyn Stewart; Peter Cross
- Cinematography: Tony Dry
- Edited by: Rosemary Ware
- Music by: Gianni Ferrio
- Production companies: Dorica Film; Explorer Film '58; Fono Roma; Films Concordia; Films Corona
- Distributed by: Euro Films International
- Release date: 1965
- Countries: Italy; France
- Language: Italian
- Box office: $2.2 million (Italy)

Blood for a Silver Dollar (Italian: Un dollaro bucato) is a 1965 spaghetti Western film directed by Calvin Jackson Padget, written by George Finley and Padget, and starring Montgomery Wood and Evelyn Stewart.

== Plot synopsis ==
Gary O'Hara, a Confederate Lieutenant, returns from the war, to fight one at home. Prior to his release from the Prisoner of War camp his pistol has its barrel sawn off, as well as his brother Phil's gun and all the pistols from Lieutenants of the South. He arrives at his house and finds his wife living in poverty. He promises to reunite with her after three months and travels to Yellowstone to make a living. There, he meets the wealthy landowner and banker McCoy, who hires Gary and asks him to arrest a new gangster in town named "Black Jack", who has supposedly wrought havoc in the community.

Gary agrees to kill Black Jack, but it is revealed too late that the outlaw is actually his brother Phil, who also recognizes his brother Gary just a second later after shooting him. McCoy and his men kill Phil and order a Mexican farmer and his wife to bury him and Gary. Soon after, the Mexicans discover that Gary has miraculously survived being shot, since the bullet was stopped by a silver dollar coin Gary always carries in his left pocket. The Mexican couple takes Gary away to safety, and everyone in Yellowstone believes he has died.

After hiding away for some time, Gary returns to the lands near Yellowstone and saves a group of farmers who are being harassed into selling their lands to McCoy. Thus he finds out that his brother Phil was actually protecting and helping the defenseless farmers against McCoy's men's raids and violence. Gary sets himself up for revenge against his former employer, and works with the local sheriff and the farmers' leader to stop McCoy's men from stealing a shipment of gold belonging to the farmers to be used by them to pay off a loan to the bank owned by McCoy. Nevertheless, events take a turn when Gary realizes that the sheriff, as well as McCoy, are in fact former criminals wanted by the law and are only masquerading as respectable men. Things get even more complicated when O'Hara's wife comes into town looking for her husband.

== Cast ==
Scene from Blood for a Silver Dollar.

- Montgomery Wood - Gary O'Hara
- Evelyn Stewart - Judy O'Hara
- Peter Cross - McCory/Max Cory/McCoy/Aloysius MacKenzie
- Tor Altmayer - Peter
- Max Dean - Brad
- Frank Farrel - Sheriff George Anderson
- Andrew Scott - Slim
- Nicholas Saint John - Phil O'Hara/Black Jack/Black Eye
- John MacDouglas - Donaldson

== Release ==
Blood for a Silver Dollar was first released in 1965. Upon release in the United States, nearly all of the cast members and production team had their names changed for the English audience.

== Reception ==
It was the second highest-grossing Italian film in Italy for the year, behind For A Few Dollars More, with a gross of $2,225,000.

== See also ==
- List of Italian films of 1965
