= Mr. Superinvisible =

1970 film

- Theatrical release poster
- Directed by: Antonio Margheriti
- Written by: Maria Laura Rocca
- Cinematography: Alejandro Ulloa
- Edited by: Otello Colangeli
- Music by: Carlo Savina
- Production companies: Edo Cinematografica; Producciones Cinematografica DIA; Peter Carsten Produktion
- Release date: 1970
- Running time: 91 minutes
- Countries: Italy; Spain; West Germany

Mr. Superinvisible (Italian: L'inafferrabile invincibile Mr. Invisibile, also known as Mr. Invisible and The Unseizable Invincible Mr. Invisible) is a 1970 Italian fantasy-comedy film directed by Antonio Margheriti. It was released in the United States as the first film of the K-Tel company.

== Plot ==
Scientist Peter Denwell works at a Geneva research institute where he has developed a promising anti‑influenza vaccine. On the day he is scheduled to present his findings, the serum mysteriously disappears. While searching for it, Peter accidentally drinks a potion mistakenly sent to him by a colleague in India. The mixture renders him temporarily invisible, along with his sheepdog.

Using his invisibility to investigate the theft, Peter witnesses the kidnapping of his friend and fellow researcher Kokofrecovitch. His search leads him to Harold, another scientist at the institute, and he discovers that Harold stole the vaccine under orders from Mamma Spot, the domineering leader of a small criminal gang. When the potion’s effects wear off, Peter is captured, forcing him to find a way to escape, recover the stolen serum, and rescue his colleague before the gang can exploit the discovery.

== Cast ==
- Dean Jones as Peter Denwell
- Gastone Moschin as Koko
- Ingeborg Schöner as Irene
- Peter Carsten as Pomerantz
- Alan Collins as Raimondo
- Roberto Camardiel as Beithel
- Giacomo Furia
- Liana Del Balzo
- Luigi Bonos

== Reception ==
In a contemporary review, the Monthly Film Bulletin stated that the film adds little innovation already done by films such as The Invisible Man (1933). The review noted "flaccid direction" and an "uninventive" script. The film did praise the special effects as "competently handled" while "tiresome dubbing detracts from hardworking performances"

== Release ==
=== Home media ===
Mr. Superinvisible was first released on VHS in 1984 by K-Tel Video in the United States. A second release on VHS in 1986 by Simitar Entertainment. A third release on VHS came in 1992 by GoodTimes Home Video. A DVD was released on April 14, 2009 by Wham! USA. Another DVD was released on January 1, 2019 by Reel Vault
