= Captain from Toledo =

- Directed by: Eugenio Martín
- Written by: Eugenio Martín; Ugo Moretti
- Starring: Stephen Forsyth
- Cinematography: Franco Villa
- Edited by: Maurizio Lucidi
- Music by: Angelo Francesco Lavagnino
- Release date: 1965
- Country: Italy
- Language: Italian

Captain from Toledo (Italian: L'uomo di Toledo, Spanish: El hombre de Toledo, German: Der Mann von Toledo) is a 1965 Italian-Spanish-German adventure film written and directed by Eugenio Martín and starring Stephen Forsyth and Ann Smyrner. Set in medieval Toledo, Spain, the Italian film critic Marco Giusti described it as a crossover between Eurospy and swashbuckler genres.

== Premise ==
The story unfolds in Toledo in 1843. Captain Miguel de Fuentes (Stephen Forsyth), is assigned the task of discovering the killer of Don Alfonso (Nerio Bernardi), who is the supreme commander of the Spanish armies.

== Cast ==
- Stephen Forsyth as Captain Miguel de Fuentes
- Ann Smyrner as Doña Rosita
- Norma Bengell as Myriam
- Gianni Solaro as Don Pedro
- Maria Laura Rocca as Doña Sol
- Gabriella Andreini as Cafat
- Nerio Bernardi as Don Alfonso
- José Calvo as Don Canio
- Aldo Cecconi as Don Raphael
- Ivan Desny as Don Felipe
- Carl Möhner as Don Ramiro
- Manolo Gómez Bur
- Andrea Scotti as Carlos
- Rosy Zichel as Aixa
