= Fabrizio Vidale =

Italian voice actor

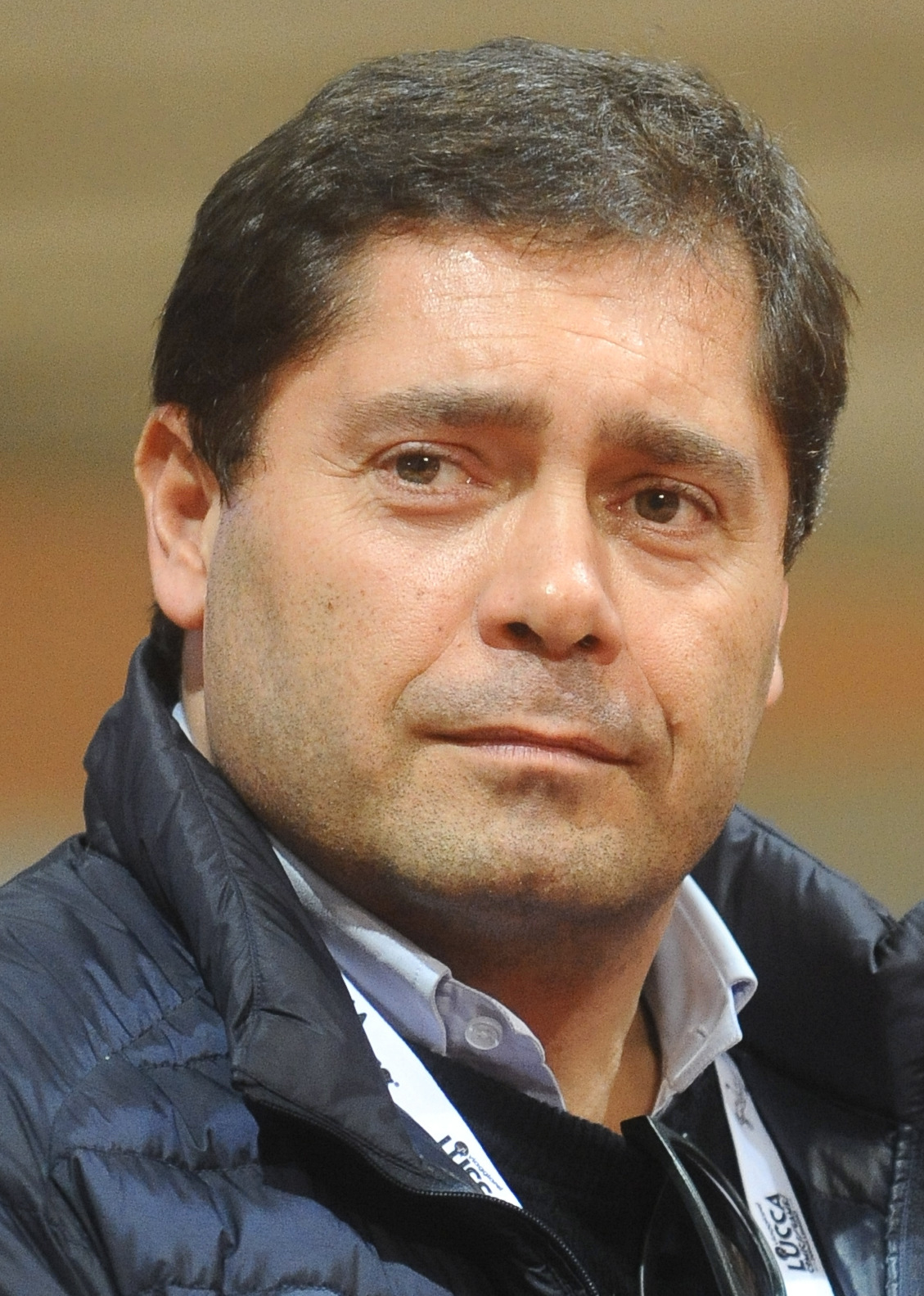
- Vidale attending the Lucca Comics & Games convention in 2015
- Born: 2 February 1970 (age 56); Rome, Italy
- Occupations: Actor; voice actor; radio presenter
- Years active: 1975–present
- Spouse: Tiziana Graziani (m. 2014)
- Children: 2
- Parents: Franco Latini (father); Piera Vidale (mother)
- Relatives: Laura Latini (paternal half-sister); Ilaria Latini (paternal half-sister)

Fabrizio Vidale (born 2 February 1970) is an Italian actor and voice actor.

== Biography ==
Born in Rome, Vidale is the son of actors Franco Latini and Piera Vidale and the half-brother of Latini's two daughters Laura and Ilaria Latini, who are also voice actresses. Active in theatre, film and television, he made his screen debut as a child in the 1979 film Io zombo, tu zombi, lei zomba. Vidale was awarded a Telegatto in 2003 for his portrayal of a younger Pope John XXIII in the television film The Good Pope: Pope John XXIII.

As a voice actor, Vidale is the primary Italian voice dubber of Jack Black and has also regularly or occasionally dubbed Marlon Wayans, Martin Lawrence, Eddie Murphy, Don Cheadle, Anthony Anderson, David Oyelowo, Nick Frost, Will Smith and Chris Rock in some of their films. He is known for voicing Bilbo Baggins (portrayed by Martin Lawrence) in the Italian version of The Hobbit film franchise as well as War Machine (portrayed by Terrence Howard and Don Cheadle) in the Italian dubbed versions of the Marvel Cinematic Universe films.

In Vidale's animated roles, he voiced Sandokan in an Italian animated series, as well as providing the Italian voice of Piglet in the Winnie the Pooh franchise from 1989 until 2003 when he was replaced by Luca Dal Fabbro, as well as Owen in Total Drama. Some of his film dubbing roles include King Candy in Wreck-It Ralph, Maui in Moana, Gunter in Sing, B.O.B in Monsters vs. Aliens and Bowser in The Super Mario Bros. Movie.

=== Personal life ===
Since 2014, Vidale has been married to Tiziana Graziani (who is the daughter of voice actor Sergio Graziani) after 21 years of dating. Together, they have two daughters, Chiara and Sara, who are also voice actresses.

== Filmography ==
=== Cinema ===
| Year | Title | Role | Notes |
|---|---|---|---|
| 1979 | Io zombo, tu zombi, lei zomba | Vittorio's son | |
| 1987 | L'estate sta finendo | Tonfo | |
| 1991 | Ultra | Smilzo | |
| 1991 | Women in Skirts | Fat nurse | |
| 1997 | Fireworks | Er Manzo | |
| 1997 | Naja | 1st soldier in the bar | |
| 1997 | Il decisionista | Tennis friend | |

=== Television ===
| Year | Title | Role | Notes |
|---|---|---|---|
| 1990 | Un cane sciolto | Young Balestro | TV miniseries |
| 2003 | The Good Pope: Pope John XXIII | Angelo Giuseppe Roncalli (young) | TV film |

== Voice work ==
| Year | Title | Role | Notes |
|---|---|---|---|
| 1998 | Lucky and Zorba | Igor | Animated film |
| 2001 | Sandokan - La tigre ruggisce ancora | Sandokan | Animated series |
| 2001 | I Magotti e la Pentola magica | Tetè | Animated film |
| 2004 | In Search of the Titanic | Cutter | Animated film |
| 2008 | Sandokan - Le due tigri | Sandokan | Animated series |
| 2012 | Pinocchio | The Auctioneer | Animated film |

=== Dubbing ===
==== Film (Animation, Italian dub) ====
| Year | Title | Role(s) | Ref |
|---|---|---|---|
| 1973 | Robin Hood | Tagalong | |
| 1981 | The Fox and the Hound | Young Copper | |
| 1996 | Space Jam | Monstar Bupkus | |
| 1997 | The Many Adventures of Winnie the Pooh | Piglet | |
| 1997 | Anastasia | Bartok | |
| 1998 | Pooh's Grand Adventure: The Search for Christopher Robin | Piglet | |
| 1998 | Quest for Camelot | Bladebeak | |
| 1998 | Beauty and the Beast: The Enchanted Christmas | Fife | |
| 1998 | Kirikou and the Sorceress | Fetish on the Roof | |
| 1999 | Bartok the Magnificent | Bartok | |
| 2000 | The Tigger Movie | Piglet | |
| 2000 | The Little Mermaid II: Return to the Sea | Tip | |
| 2001 | Cats & Dogs | Lou | |
| 2003 | Mazinkaiser vs. The Great General of Darkness | Koji Kabuto | |
| 2003 | Looney Tunes: Back in Action | Speedy Gonzales | |
| 2003 | Stitch! The Movie | Jacques von Hämsterviel | |
| 2004 | Winnie the Pooh: A Valentine for You | Piglet | |
| 2004 | Barbie as the Princess and the Pauper | Nack | |
| 2004 | The Adventures of Ichabod and Mr. Toad | Mr. Winky | |
| 2006 | The Adventures of Brer Rabbit | Brer Rabbit | |
| 2006 | Open Season | Mr. Weenie | |
| 2006 | Bambi II | The Groundhog | |
| 2006 | Hoodwinked! | Detective Bill Stork | |
| 2006 | Barnyard | Otis | |
| 2007 | Bee Movie | Barry B. Benson | |
| 2007 | The Three Robbers | Dominik | |
| 2008 | Open Season 2 | Mr. Weenie | |
| 2008 | Igor | Dr. Schadenfreude's Igor | |
| 2009 | Monsters vs. Aliens | B.O.B. | |
| 2009 | G-Force | Blaster | |
| 2009 | A Christmas Carol | Ghost of Christmas Past | |
| 2010 | Cats & Dogs: The Revenge of Kitty Galore | Lou | |
| 2010 | Open Season 3 | Mr. Weenie | |
| 2011 | Mars Needs Moms | Gribble | |
| 2011 | Gnomeo & Juliet | Paris | |
| 2011 | Rio | Pedro | |
| 2012 | The Pirates! In an Adventure with Scientists! | The Pirate with a Scarf | |
| 2012 | The Lorax | Uncle Ubb | |
| 2012 | Wreck-It Ralph | King Candy / Turbo | |
| 2012 | Ice Age: Continental Drift | Flynn | |
| 2013 | Iron Man: Rise of Technovore | James Rhodes / War Machine | |
| 2013 | The Smurfs 2 | Hackus | |
| 2013 | Walking with Dinosaurs | Scowler | |
| 2014 | The Nut Job | Surly | |
| 2014 | Rio 2 | Pedro | |
| 2014 | The Boxtrolls | Mr. Gristle | |
| 2015 | Open Season: Scared Silly | Mr. Weenie | |
| 2016 | The Angry Birds Movie | Ross | |
| 2016 | Sing | Gunter | |
| 2016 | Norm of the North | Mr. Greene | |
| 2016 | Moana | Maui | |
| 2017 | The Nut Job 2: Nutty by Nature | Surly | |
| 2017 | Deep | Rico | |
| 2018 | Asterix: The Secret of the Magic Potion | Cacofonix | |
| 2018 | Sherlock Gnomes | Paris | |
| 2019 | The Secret Life of Pets 2 | Sergei | |
| 2019 | Toy Story 4 | Ducky | |
| 2020 | Soul | Lamont "Curley" Baker | |
| 2021 | Encanto | Félix Madrigal | |
| 2021 | Sing 2 | Gunter | |
| 2021 | Back to the Outback | Pretty Boy | |
| 2022 | Apollo 10 1/2: A Space Age Childhood | Adult Stanley | |
| 2022 | Chip 'n Dale: Rescue Rangers | Scrooge McDuck | |
| 2022 | Chip 'n Dale: Rescue Rangers | B.O.B. | |
| 2022 | Guillermo del Toro's Pinocchio | Priest | |
| 2022 | Scrooge: A Christmas Carol | Ghost of Christmas Present | |
| 2022 | Night at the Museum: Kahmunrah Rises Again | Theodore Roosevelt | |
| 2023 | The Super Mario Bros. Movie | Bowser | |
| 2024 | IF | Banana | |
| 2024 | Moana 2 | Maui | |

==== Film (Live action, Italian dub) ====
| Year | Title | Role(s) | Original actor | Ref |
|---|---|---|---|---|
| 1979 | The Sheriff and the Satellite Kid | H7-25 / Charlie Warren | Cary Guffey | |
| 1980 | Everything Happens to Me | H7-25 / Charlie Warren | Cary Guffey | |
| 1991 | Point Break | Alvarez | Julian Reyes | |
| 1992 | Boomerang | Bony T | Chris Rock | |
| 1992 | Aces: Iron Eagle III | "Tee Vee" | Phill Lewis | |
| 1992 | My Cousin Vinny | Bill Gambini | Ralph Macchio | |
| 1993 | Homeward Bound: The Incredible Journey | Chance | Michael J. Fox | |
| 1993 | Sister Act 2: Back in the Habit | Richard "Sketch" Pincham | Ron Johnson | |
| 1994 | Natural Born Killers | Deputy Sparky | Louis Lombardi | |
| 1994 | Jason's Lyric | Joshua Alexander | Bokeem Woodbine | |
| 1996 | Homeward Bound II: Lost in San Francisco | Chance | Michael J. Fox | |
| 1997 | Leprechaun 4: In Space | Private Sticks | Miguel A. Núñez Jr. | |
| 1997 | Batman & Robin | Spike | Nicky Katt | |
| 1998 | Around the Fire | Trace | Colman Domingo | |
| 1998 | He Got Game | Jesus Shuttlesworth | Ray Allen | |
| 1999 | The Blair Witch Project | Mike | Michael C. Williams | |
| 1999 | The Matrix | Tank | Marcus Chong | |
| 1999 | Dogma | Rufus | Chris Rock | |
| 2000 | The Legend of Bagger Vance | Bagger Vance | Will Smith | |
| 2000 | Love's Labour's Lost | Dumaine | Adrian Lester | |
| 2000 | High Fidelity | Barry Judd | Jack Black | |
| 2000 | Romeo Must Die | Maurice | Anthony Anderson | |
| 2000 | Scary Movie | Shorty Meeks | Marlon Wayans | |
| 2000 | Dungeons & Dragons | Snails | Marlon Wayans | |
| 2000 | The Replacements | Walter Cochran | Troy Winbush | |
| 2001 | Exit Wounds | T.K. Johnson | Anthony Anderson | |
| 2001 | See Spot Run | Benny Washington | Anthony Anderson | |
| 2001 | Scary Movie 2 | Shorty Meeks | Marlon Wayans | |
| 2001 | Driven | Demille Bly | Robert Sean Leonard | |
| 2001 | Valentine | Campbell Morris | Daniel Cosgrove | |
| 2002 | Bad Company | Jake Hayes / Kevin Pope / Michael Turner | Chris Rock | |
| 2002 | 8 Mile | Cheddar Bob | Evan Jones | |
| 2003 | The Italian Job | Gilligan "Left Ear" | Mos Def | |
| 2003 | Once Upon a Time in America | Bugsy (2003 redub) | James Russo | |
| 2003 | Cradle 2 the Grave | Tommy | Anthony Anderson | |
| 2003 | Kangaroo Jack | Louis Booker | Anthony Anderson | |
| 2003 | School of Rock | Dewey Finn | Jack Black | |
| 2003 | Kontroll | Tibi | Zsolt Nagy | |
| 2003 | Latter Days | Christian Markelli | Wes Ramsey | |
| 2004 | Lemony Snicket's A Series of Unfortunate Events | Bald-Headed Man | Luis Guzmán | |
| 2004 | The Ladykillers | Gawain MacSam | Marlon Wayans | |
| 2004 | White Chicks | Marcus Copeland / Tiffany Wilson | Marlon Wayans | |
| 2004 | King Arthur | Gawain | Joel Edgerton | |
| 2005 | Pride & Prejudice | Mr. Collins | Tom Hollander | |
| 2005 | Hostel | Paxton Rodriguez | Jay Hernandez | |
| 2005 | King Kong | Carl Denham | Jack Black | |
| 2005 | Hustle & Flow | Key | Anthony Anderson | |
| 2005 | Brokeback Mountain | Jack Twist | Jake Gyllenhaal | |
| 2005 | Rebound | Roy McCormick | Martin Lawrence | |
| 2005 | Rebound | Don McCormick | Martin Lawrence | |
| 2005 | Son of the Mask | Tim Avery / The Mask | Jamie Kennedy | |
| 2006 | Little Man | Calvin Simms | Marlon Wayans | |
| 2006 | Déjà Vu | Gunnars | Elden Henson | |
| 2006 | Nacho Libre | Ignacio / Nacho | Jack Black | |
| 2006 | The Holiday | Miles Dumont | Jack Black | |
| 2006 | Take the Lead | Jason "Rock" Rockwell | Rob Brown | |
| 2007 | Hot Fuzz | Danny Butterman | Nick Frost | |
| 2007 | Margot at the Wedding | Malcolm | Jack Black | |
| 2007 | War | Benny | Luis Guzmán | |
| 2007 | Hostel: Part II | Paxton Rodriguez | Jay Hernandez | |
| 2008 | The Rocker | Matt Gadman | Josh Gad | |
| 2008 | Iron Man | James Rhodes / War Machine | Terrence Howard | |
| 2008 | Be Kind Rewind | Jerry McLean | Jack Black | |
| 2008 | Tropic Thunder | Jeff Portnoy | Jack Black | |
| 2009 | Year One | Zed | Jack Black | |
| 2009 | Fighting | Harvey Boarden | Terrence Howard | |
| 2009 | The Hangover | Black Doug | Mike Epps | |
| 2009 | G.I. Joe: The Rise of Cobra | Wallace Weems / Ripcord | Marlon Wayans | |
| 2010 | Winter's Bone | Mike Satterfield | Tate Taylor | |
| 2010 | Iron Man 2 | James Rhodes / War Machine | Don Cheadle | |
| 2010 | Trollhunter | Kalle | Tomas Alf Larsen | |
| 2010 | Gulliver's Travels | Lemuel Gulliver | Jack Black | |
| 2010 | Devil | Ben Larson | Bokeem Woodbine | |
| 2010 | London Boulevard | Danny | Stephen Graham | |
| 2011 | The Adjustment Bureau | Harry Mitchell | Anthony Mackie | |
| 2011 | Arthur | Bitterman | Luis Guzmán | |
| 2011 | Rise of the Planet of the Apes | Steven Jacobs | David Oyelowo | |
| 2011 | The Help | Preacher Green | David Oyelowo | |
| 2011 | Beverly Hills Chihuahua 2 | Mr. McKibble | Phill Lewis | |
| 2011 | Mr. Popper's Penguins | Young Tom Popper Sr. | Brian T. Delaney | |
| 2011 | Paul | Clive Gollings | Nick Frost | |
| 2011 | The Muppets | Jack Black | Jack Black | |
| 2011 | Bernie | Bernie Tiede | Jack Black | |
| 2011 | The Thing | Jonas | Kristofer Hivju | |
| 2011 | Scream 4 | Anthony Perkins | Anthony Anderson | |
| 2011 | The Guard | Wendell Everett | Don Cheadle | |
| 2012 | Snow White and the Huntsman | Nion | Nick Frost | |
| 2012 | Flight | Hugh Lang | Don Cheadle | |
| 2012 | The Hobbit: An Unexpected Journey | Bilbo Baggins | Martin Freeman | |
| 2012 | Man on a Ledge | Mike Ackerman | Anthony Mackie | |
| 2012 | Jack Reacher | Calvin Emerson | David Oyelowo | |
| 2012 | Lincoln | Harold Green | Colman Domingo | |
| 2012 | Safe | Quan Chang | Reggie Lee | |
| 2013 | The Incredible Burt Wonderstone | Rick the Implausible | Jay Mohr | |
| 2013 | Prisoners | Detective Loki | Jake Gyllenhaal | |
| 2013 | Iron Man 3 | James Rhodes / Iron Patriot | Don Cheadle | |
| 2013 | Movie 43 | Coach Jackson | Terrence Howard | |
| 2013 | The Hangover Part III | Black Doug | Mike Epps | |
| 2013 | The Hobbit: The Desolation of Smaug | Bilbo Baggins | Martin Freeman | |
| 2013 | Last Vegas | Redfoo | Redfoo | |
| 2013 | The World's End | Andy Knightley | Nick Frost | |
| 2014 | The Hobbit: The Battle of the Five Armies | Bilbo Baggins | Martin Freeman | |
| 2015 | The D Train | Daniel Gregory Landsman | Jack Black | |
| 2015 | Goosebumps | R. L. Stine | Jack Black | |
| 2015 | Goosebumps | Slappy the Dummy | Jack Black | |
| 2015 | Unfinished Business | Bill Whilmsley | Nick Frost | |
| 2015 | Avengers: Age of Ultron | James Rhodes / War Machine | Don Cheadle | |
| 2015 | Our Brand Is Crisis | Ben | Anthony Mackie | |
| 2015 | Stonewall | Marsha P. Johnson | Otoja Abit | |
| 2016 | Queen of Katwe | Robert Katende | David Oyelowo | |
| 2016 | Captain America: Civil War | James Rhodes / War Machine | Don Cheadle | |
| 2017 | Murder on the Orient Express | Hector MacQueen | Josh Gad | |
| 2017 | Ghost Stories | Mike Priddle / Charles Cameron | Martin Freeman | |
| 2017 | Naked | Rob Anderson | Marlon Wayans | |
| 2018 | Avengers: Infinity War | James Rhodes / War Machine | Don Cheadle | |
| 2018 | Jumanji: Welcome to the Jungle | Professor Sheldon Oberon | Jack Black | |
| 2018 | Don't Worry, He Won't Get Far on Foot | Dexter | Jack Black | |
| 2018 | Goosebumps 2: Haunted Halloween | R. L. Stine | Jack Black | |
| 2018 | The House with a Clock in Its Walls | Jonathan Barnavelt | Jack Black | |
| 2019 | Jumanji: The Next Level | Professor Sheldon Oberon | Jack Black | |
| 2019 | Captain Marvel | James Rhodes / War Machine | Don Cheadle | |
| 2019 | Avengers: Endgame | James Rhodes / War Machine | Don Cheadle | |
| 2019 | Dolemite Is My Name | Rudy Ray Moore | Eddie Murphy | |
| 2019 | Richard Jewell | Richard Jewell | Paul Walter Hauser | |
| 2020 | Artemis Fowl | Mulch Diggums | Josh Gad | |
| 2020 | The Water Man | Amos Boone | David Oyelowo | |
| 2021 | The King's Man | George V | Tom Hollander | |
| 2021 | The King's Man | Wilhelm II | Tom Hollander | |
| 2021 | The King's Man | Nicholas II | Tom Hollander | |
| 2021 | Vacation Friends | Marcus | Lil Rel Howery | |
| 2021 | Coming 2 America | King Akeem Joffer | Eddie Murphy | |
| 2021 | Coming 2 America | Randy Watson | Eddie Murphy | |
| 2021 | Coming 2 America | Saul | Eddie Murphy | |
| 2021 | Coming 2 America | Clarence | Eddie Murphy | |
| 2022 | All Quiet on the Western Front | Lieutenant Hoppe | Andreas Döhler | |
| 2022 | See How They Run | Mervyn Cocker-Norris | David Oyelowo | |
| 2022 | The Menu | George Diaz | John Leguizamo | |
| 2023 | You People | Akbar Mohammed | Eddie Murphy | |
| 2023 | Candy Cane Lane | Chris Carver | Eddie Murphy | |
| 2023 | Vacation Friends 2 | Marcus | Lil Rel Howery | |
| 2023 | Oppenheimer | Lloyd K. Garrison | Macon Blair | |
| 2023 | Tetris | Valentin Trifonov | Igor Grabuzov | |
| 2024 | Beverly Hills Cop: Axel F | Axel Foley | Eddie Murphy | |
| 2024 | Unstoppable | Shawn Charles | Don Cheadle | |
| 2025 | A Minecraft Movie | Steve | Jack Black | |
| 2026 | Moana | Maui | Dwayne Johnson | |

==== Television (Animation, Italian dub) ====
| Year | Title | Role(s) | Notes | Ref |
|---|---|---|---|---|
| 1989 | Fluppy Dogs | Dink | TV film | |
| 1990 | Cartoon All-Stars to the Rescue | Michael | TV film | |
| 1990 | Cartoon All-Stars to the Rescue | Brainy Smurf | TV film | |
| 1993–1995 | The Simpsons | Nelson Muntz | Recurring role (seasons 3–5) | |
| 1993–1995 | The Simpsons | Carl Carlson | Recurring role (seasons 3–5) | |
| 1996–2006 | Looney Tunes | Speedy Gonzales | Main cast; 1990s redubs | |
| 1996–2006 | Merrie Melodies | Speedy Gonzales | Main cast; 1990s redubs | |
| 1999 | Captain Tsubasa J | Tsubasa Oozora | Main cast | |
| 2000, 2012 | Futurama | Cubert Farnsworth | Recurring role (seasons 2, 6) | |
| 2000–2003 | South Park | Kyle Broflovski | Main cast (seasons 1–3; 1st voice) | |
| 2002 | The Book of Pooh | Piglet | Main cast | |
| 2002 | Kim Possible | Señor Senior Jr. | Recurring role (season 1; 1st voice) | |
| 2002 | It's a Very Merry Muppet Christmas Movie | Pepe the King Prawn | TV film | |
| 2004–2005 | Captain Tsubasa: Road to 2002 | Tsubasa Oozora | Main cast | |
| 2004–2007 | Lilo & Stitch: The Series | Jacques von Hämsterviel | Main cast | |
| 2006 | Groove Squad | Larry | TV film | |
| 2006 | Leroy & Stitch | Jacques von Hämsterviel | TV film | |
| 2007–present | Total Drama | Owen | Main cast | |
| 2013–2014 | Monsters vs. Aliens | B.O.B. | Main cast | |
| 2017–2022 | DuckTales | Scrooge McDuck | Main cast | |
| 2018–2020 | The Boss Baby: Back in Business | Mega Fat | Recurring role | |
| 2024–present | Hazbin Hotel | Lucifer Morningstar | Recurring role | |

==== Television (Live action, Italian dub) ====
| Year | Title | Role(s) | Notes | Original actor | Ref |
|---|---|---|---|---|---|
| 2005–2011 | The Wire | Ellis Carver | Main cast | Seth Gilliam | |
| 2009 | Dadnapped | Maurice Legarche | TV film | Phill Lewis | |
| 2011 | The Suite Life Movie | Mr. Moseby | TV film | Phill Lewis | |
| 2015–2022 | The Walking Dead | Gabriel Stokes | Recurring role (seasons 5–11) | Seth Gilliam | |
| 2021 | The Falcon and the Winter Soldier | James Rhodes / War Machine | TV miniseries | Don Cheadle | |
| 2023 | The Mandalorian | Captain Bombardier | 1 episode (season 3; episode 6) | Jack Black | |
| 2024 | Like a Dragon: Yakuza | Keiji Shibusawa | Recurring role | | |

==== Video games (Italian dub) ====
| Year | Title | Role(s) | Ref |
|---|---|---|---|
| 2008 | Kung Fu Panda | Po | |
| 2009 | G-Force | Blaster | |
| 2010 | Alice in Wonderland | Tweedledum and Tweedledee | |
| 2011 | Kinect: Disneyland Adventures | Br'er Rabbit | |
| 2012 | Epic Mickey 2: The Power of Two | Gilbert | |
| 2012 | DreamWorks Madagascar 3: The Video Game | Marty | |
