= 1962 in Italy =

- Decades: 1940s; 1950s; 1960s; 1970s; 1980s
- See also: History of Italy; Timeline of Italian history; List of years in Italy

Events during the year 1962 in Italy

== Incumbents ==
- President – Antonio Segni
- Prime Minister – Amintore Fanfani

== Events ==
31 May – Voghera train crash: in Voghera a freight train coming from Milan did not respect a red light and crashed into a train full of passengers headed for Liguria, which was stopped on the third track. It was the most serious Italian rail disaster of the post-war period, with 63 victims.

== Births ==
- 15 January – Margherita Buy, actress
- 10 February – Piero Pelù, singer and songwriter
- 2 March – Gabriele Tarquini, race car driver
- 29 March – Elena Sofia Ricci, actress
- 23 September – Cosimo Fusco, actor
- 30 September – Massimo Bottura, Chef and Restaurateur
- 14 November – Stefano Gabbana, Fashion Designer
- 30 December – Alessandra Mussolini, former politician, model and singer

== Deaths ==
- 28 April – Gianna Beretta Molla, saint (born 1922)
- 20 May – Alessandro Pirzio Biroli, army general (born 1877)
