= Agente X 1-7 operazione Oceano =

- Original film poster
- Directed by: Tanio Boccia
- Written by: Tanio Boccia, Alberto De Rossi, Mario Moroni, H.S. Valdés, Fernando Vitali
- Cinematography: Ricardo Torres
- Edited by: Ángel Serrano
- Music by: Piero Umiliani
- Release date: 2 December 1965
- Running time: 91 minutes
- Country: Italy
- Language: Italian

Agente X 1-7 operazione Oceano (Spanish: Agente X 1-7 operación Océano) is a 1965 Italian-Spanish spy film adventure directed by Tanio Boccia.

== Plot ==
Professor Calvert has invented a revolutionary formula which make it possible to manipulate the oceans. An international criminal organisation intends to use his research to blackmail whole nations. After they've abducted him special agent George Collins must extract Calvert from a fortress.

== Cast ==
- Lang Jeffries as George Collins
- Aurora de Alba
- Rafael Bardem
- Eleonora Bianchi
- Gloria Osuna
- Wladimiro Tuicovich
- Ángel Jordán
- Moa Tahi
- Joe Kamel
- Nando Angelini
- Gianni Solaro
- Aldo Bonamano
- Andrea Scandurra

== Biography ==
- Blake, Matt; Deal, David (2004). The Eurospy Guide. Baltimore: Luminary Press. ISBN 1-887664-52-1.
