= Perché uccidi ancora =

1965 film

- Directed by: José Antonio de la Loma; Edoardo Mulargia
- Written by: Vincenzo Musolino; Edoardo Mulargia
- Starring: Anthony Steffen
- Cinematography: Hans Burmann; Vitaliano Natalucci
- Edited by: Enzo Alabiso
- Music by: Felice Di Stefano
- Release date: 1965
- Running time: 88 minutes (Italian version)
- Country: Italy
- Language: Italian

Perché uccidi ancora (English: Blue Summer) is a 1965 Italian western film adventure directed by José Antonio de la Loma and Edoardo Mulargia.

== Plot ==
Steven MacDougall quits the army when he receives the message that his father has been gunned down by a member of the Lopez clan. He hurries to protect his kin but the Lopez clan knows that he's coming. Only scarcely he escapes their trap. When he's eventually joined his family, their farm is attacked, yet Steven fights of his enemies another time. Now the fiendish Lopez clan hires a professional assassin from outside.

== Cast ==
- Anthony Steffen ... Steve McDougall
- Ida Galli ... Judy McDougall
- Aldo Berti ... Gringo
- Gemma Cuervo ... Pilar Gómez (as Jennifer Crowe)
- José Calvo ... López (as Josepe Calvo)
- Hugo Blanco ... Manuel Lopez
- José Torres ... Lopez Henchman
- Franco Latini ... Oliveras (as Frank Campbell)
- Ignazio Leone
- Lino Desmond ... Gringo's brother
- Willi Colombini
- Stelio Candelli (as Stanley Kent)
- Giovanni Ivan Scratuglia ... Lopez Henchman (as Giovanni Ivan)
