= The Thief of Damascus =

- Directed by: Mario Amendola
- Written by: Mario Amendola
- Produced by: Tullio Bruschi
- Starring: Tony Russel; Luciana Gilli; Gianni Solaro
- Cinematography: Luciano Trasatti
- Edited by: Nella Nannuzzi
- Music by: Giorgio Fabor
- Production company: Rodes Cinematografica
- Distributed by: Variety Distribution
- Release date: 19 February 1964
- Running time: 105 minutes (93 minutes in US)
- Country: Italy
- Language: Italian

The Thief of Damascus (Italian: Il ladro di Damasco) is a 1964 Italian adventure film directed by Mario Amendola and starring Tony Russel, Luciana Gilli and Gianni Solaro. It was released in the US as Sword of Damascus at a running time of 93 minutes.

The film's sets were designed by the art director Alfredo Montori.

== Cast ==
- Tony Russel as Jesen
- Luciana Gilli as Miriam
- Gianni Solaro as Tibullo
- Ferruccio Amendola as Tisba
- Enrico Salvatore
- Bruno Ukmar
- Adriana Limiti
- Pietro Tordi
- Irena Prosen
- Renato Baldini as Uria
- Giuseppe Fortis as Mannae

== Bibliography ==
- Roy Kinnard & Tony Crnkovich. Italian Sword and Sandal Films, 1908-1990. McFarland, 21 2017.
