= Delitto carnale =

- Directed by: Cesare Canevari
- Screenplay by: Cesare Canevari; Fulvio Ricciardi
- Story by: Aldo Crudo
- Produced by: Antonio Bertuccili
- Starring: Marc Porel; Sonia Otero; Fulvio Ricciardi; Moana Pozzi
- Music by: Mimi Uva
- Release date: 1983
- Running time: 91 minutes
- Country: Italy

Delitto carnale (transl. Carnal crime) is an Italian giallo film directed by Cesare Canevari.

== Production ==
The film was shot in just a week at an empty hotel in the Southern Puglia. The score of the film by Mimi Uva was reused from the film La sorella di Ursula.

It was Canevari's last feature film and marked the final screen appearance of Porel, who died four months after the film's release.

== Release ==
Delitto carnale was released in 1983. It was released in Italy by Kineo with two versions: a soft version running 83 minutes and 26 seconds, and a heavily re-edited "hardcore" version running 83 minutes and 57 seconds.

== Reception ==
In his book Blood and Black Lace: The Definitive Guide to Italian Sex and Horror Movies, author Adrian Luther-Smith described the film as a "weak, sexed-up addition to the giallo genre." Specifically, the film had poor murder sequences and had cheap production values. Robert Curti in his book Italian Giallo in Film and Television (2022) said the film took 50 minutes before it got to its whodunnit plot and most of the murders are shown offscreen.

Canevari later spoke about the film, saying "It's crap. I was asked to shoot it and foolishly said yes."
