= 1963 in Italy =

- Decades: 1940s; 1950s; 1960s; 1970s; 1980s
- See also: History of Italy; Timeline of Italian history; List of years in Italy

Events during the year 1963 in Italy

== Incumbents ==
- President – Antonio Segni
- Prime Minister – Amintore Fanfani (until 21 June), then Giovanni Leone (until 5 December), then Aldo Moro

== Events ==
- 28 April – General election.
- 9 June – Sicilian regional election.
- 30 June – Ciaculli massacre: Seven police and army officers are killed when a car bomb explodes in Ciaculli.
- 21 September–29 September – The Mediterranean Games are held in Naples.
- 9 October – Vajont Landslide (Disastro del Vajont) resulted in the overtopping of the Vajont Dam and an estimated death toll of around 2,000.

== Births ==
- 10 March – Anna Maria Corazza Bildt, politician
- 14 August – Eugene Scalia, politician and attorney
- 28 October – Eros Ramazzotti, musician

== Deaths ==
- 6 February – Piero Manzoni, artist (born 1933)
- 18 February – Beppe Fenoglio, writer (born 1922)
- 18 June – Fernando Tambroni, politician and prime minister (born 1901)

== Notes ==
- Steinberg, S. (26 December 2016). The Statesman's Year-Book 1964-65: The One-Volume ENCYCLOPAEDIA of all nations. Springer. p. 1162. ISBN 978-0-230-27093-0.
