= Laura Latini =

Italian voice actress (1969–2012)

- Born: 3 November 1969; Rome, Italy
- Died: 19 August 2012 (aged 42); Rome, Italy
- Occupation: Voice actress
- Years active: 1990–2012
- Children: 1
- Parents: Franco Latini (father); Maria Pinto (mother)
- Relatives: Ilaria Latini (sister); Fabrizio Vidale (paternal half-brother)

Laura Latini (3 November 1969 – 19 August 2012) was an Italian voice actress.

== Biography ==
Latini was the firstborn daughter of actor Franco Latini and dialogue adapter Maria Pinto. She was also the older sister of voice actress Ilaria Latini and the older half-sister of voice actor Fabrizio Vidale. Latini was best known for providing the Italian dubbed voice of Karen Walker from Will & Grace, among other roles. She regularly dubbed actress Regina Hall in Italian.

In her animated roles, Latini voiced Dijonay Jones in the Italian dubbed version of The Proud Family, Pixie in Pixie and Dixie and Mr. Jinks, Blinky Bill in The Adventures of Blinky Bill, Sherri & Terri in The Simpsons, Gwen in Total Drama, Rita in Flushed Away more. After her death, several of her roles were replaced by other actresses, such as Roberta De Roberto, who took over her roles of Karen Walker in the 2017 revival of Will & Grace and Gwen in Total Drama All-Stars.

== Death ==
Latini died in Rome of cancer on 19 August 2012, aged 42. She was buried at Campo Verano alongside her father.

== Voice work ==
=== Animation ===
- Liva and Sciol in I Magotti e la pentola magica

==== Dubbing ====
- Pixie in Pixie and Dixie and Mr. Jinks
- Blinky Bill in The Adventures of Blinky Bill
- Sherri and Terri (2nd voice), Ralph Wiggum (seasons 4–5), Pepi and Tobias Drundridge in The Simpsons
- Skippy Squirrel in Animaniacs
- Mac and various characters in Looney Tunes and Merrie Melodies (1995 Italian redub)
- Fievel Mousekewitz in An American Tail: The Treasure of Manhattan Island
- Lola Bunny, Bertie, girl, Hostess #1 and additional voices in Tweety's High Flying Adventure
- Tessa in The Triplets
- Dijonay Jones in The Proud Family, The Proud Family Movie
- Linny in Wonder Pets
- Rita Malone in Flushed Away
- Fizz in Tweenies
- Shovel in Blue's Clues
- Adam Lyon in My Gym Partner's a Monkey
- Millie Burtonburger in Kid vs. Kat
- Huey & Riley Freeman in The Boondocks
- Austin in The Backyardigans
- Gwen (1st voice) in Total Drama
- Sleeping Beauty in Shrek the Third
- Veemon in Digimon: The Movie
- Angel in Lilo & Stitch: The Series

=== Live action dubbing roles ===
- Karen Walker in Will & Grace (season 1–8)
- Isabel Evans in Roswell
- Lexie Grey in Grey's Anatomy
- Brenda Meeks in Scary Movie, Scary Movie 2, Scary Movie 3, Scary Movie 4
- Daisy Duke in The Dukes of Hazzard
- Kim Bauer in 24
- Margaret in Sister Act 2: Back in the Habit
- Buzzy in 11:14
- Jade in The Hangover
- Nadine in Stan Helsing
- Jen Barber in The IT Crowd
- Anya Jenkins in Buffy the Vampire Slayer
- Chloe in American Pie Presents: Band Camp
- Claire Fisher in Six Feet Under
- Page Conners in Heartbreakers
- Morley Clarkson in Valentine's Day
- Nicole Maris in Drive Me Crazy
- Janey in In the Land of Women
- Samantha Baker in Sixteen Candles
