= Conqueror of Atlantis =

- Directed by: Alfonso Brescia
- Release date: 1965
- Country: Italy
- Language: Italian

Conqueror of Atlantis (Italian: Il conquistatore di Atlantide, UK title: Kingdom in the Sand) is a 1965 Italian fantasy film adventure directed by Alfonso Brescia. Although the main character is called Herakles, this film was not part of the Italian "Hercules" film series of the 1960s.

A poor quality pan & scan copy of the film is presented as a bonus feature on the DVD Goliath and the Dragon.

== Plot ==
After a shipwreck, Hercules finds himself on an unknown desert coast. He is found by Princess Virna, the daughter of a nomad prince, who takes care of the wounded Hercules. After a nightly assault, Virna disappears. Hercules starts to search for her and finally finds her in a part of Atlantis in the desert, where Virna had been selected to become the new heiress after the current Queen Ming. Hercules gets captured by Ming's Amazon guard, who take him to a mad scientist and the current queen reveals that Virna is the reincarnation of Atlantis' very first queen.

== Cast ==
- Kirk Morris ... Herakles
- Luciana Gilli ... Virna
- Piero Lulli ... Ramir
- Hélène Chanel ... Queen Ming
- Andrea Scotti ... Karr
- Mahmoud El-Sabbaa ... Assur
- Fortunato Arena ... 'Golden Ghost' Man
- Livia Rossetti
- Mohammed Tawfik
- Caterina Trentini
