= Ilaria Latini =

Italian voice actress

- Born: Rome, Italy
- Occupation: Voice actress
- Years active: 1976–present
- Spouse: Diego Suarez
- Children: Riccardo; Emanuele; Sofia
- Parents: Franco Latini (father); Maria Pinto (mother)
- Relatives: Laura Latini (sister); Fabrizio Vidale (paternal half-brother)

Ilaria Latini is an Italian voice actress.

== Biography ==
Born in Rome, Latini is the second-born daughter of actor Franco Latini and dialogue adapter Maria Pinto. She is also the younger sister of voice actress Laura Latini and the younger half-sister of voice actor Fabrizio Vidale. Latini began her voice acting career at the age of four with help from her father; to this day, she still serves as the official Italian voice of Tweety from Looney Tunes since the 1980s, and dubs Katie Holmes, Amy Adams and Anna Faris in Italian. Some of her popular dubbing roles include Joey Potter in Dawson's Creek and Alice Cullen in The Twilight Saga.

In Latini's animated roles, she has been the primary Italian voice of Flora in the popular animated series Winx Club, where she voiced other characters as well; she has also dubbed characters from animated productions such as Animaniacs, The Simpsons, Disney's House of Mouse, and Total Drama.

=== Personal life ===
Latini is married to Spanish voice actor Diego Suarez. Together, they have three children: Riccardo, Emanuele and Sofia, who are all voice actors.

== Voice work ==
- Barbara and Carlotta (Polly and Holly) in How the Toys Saved Christmas
- Flora, Amore (seasons 2–4) and Cherie (season 6+) in Winx Club, Flora and Amore in Winx Club: The Secret of the Lost Kingdom, Winx Club 3D: Magical Adventure, Flora in Winx Club: The Mystery of the Abyss, Cherie in PopPixie
- Cilli in Gli Smile and Go e il braciere di fuoco
- Isabel in Teen Days
- Additional voices in Gladiators of Rome
- Baby Pie in 44 Cats

=== Dubbing ===
==== Animation ====
- Tweety in Looney Tunes, Merrie Melodies, Who Framed Roger Rabbit, The Sylvester & Tweety Mysteries, Space Jam, Tweety's High Flying Adventure, Baby Looney Tunes (season 1), Looney Tunes: Back in Action, The Looney Tunes Show, Wabbit! A Looney Tunes Prod./New Looney Tunes, Looney Tunes Cartoons, Space Jam: A New Legacy, Bugs Bunny Builders, King Tweety
- The girl cats in Garfield in the Rough
- Nermal, Booker and additional voices in Garfield and Friends
- Sherri and Terri (3rd voice), Martin Prince (seasons 6–12), Ralph Wiggum (seasons 6–7, episodes 9.19, 9.20), Itchy (3rd voice), Greta Wolfcastle and Ashley in The Simpsons
- Snow White and Little Red Riding Hood in Disney's House of Mouse, Snow White in Sofia the First
- Jerry and Nibbles in Tom and Jerry: The Magic Ring
- Queen Frost and Kuda Fox in Devichil
- Malina and Bucky in The Emperor's New School
- Mummy Pony (seasons 1–2) and Rosie in Peppa Pig
- Dot Warner in Animaniacs
- Kari Kamiya in Digimon Adventure
- Ike Broflovski in South Park
- Emily Elizabeth in Clifford the Big Red Dog
- Lester Goldberg in Stanley
- Uniqua in The Backyardigans
- Ming-Ming in Wonder Pets
- Judy Hopps in Zootopia
- Brittany Miller in The Chipmunk Adventure
- Ali in The Land Before Time IV: Journey Through the Mists
- Lil DeVille in Rugrats
- LaCienega Boulevardez in The Proud Family
- Numbuh 3 in Codename: Kids Next Door
- Minako Aino/Sailor Venus in Sailor Moon
- Cinderella in Shrek the Third
- Katara in Avatar: The Last Airbender
- Starfire in Teen Titans, Teen Titans Go!
- Bridgette in Total Drama
- Wonder Woman in Wonder Woman (2009 film)
- Brandy Harrington in Brandy & Mr. Whiskers
- Ophelia Ramirez in The Life and Times of Juniper Lee
- Joyce Kinney in Family Guy
- Jillian in Despicable Me 2
- Ingrid Third in Fillmore!
- Po in Teletubbies
- Sticks the Badger in Sonic Boom
- Malina in The Emperor's New School
- Carmen in Happy Feet Two
- Kate in Alpha and Omega
- Quinn Airgon/Nightfall in Final Space
- Penny (2th voice) (S2-S4) in ChalkZone
- Gia in Madagascar 3: Europe's Most Wanted (Latin Spanish and French dub)
- Babs Bunny in Tiny Toons Looniversity
- Rosie in Hazbin Hotel

==== Live action ====
- Alice Cullen in Twilight,The Twilight Saga: New Moon, The Twilight Saga: Eclipse, The Twilight Saga: Breaking Dawn – Part 1, The Twilight Saga: Breaking Dawn – Part 2
- Cindy Campbell in Scary Movie, Scary Movie 2, Scary Movie 3, Scary Movie 4
- Lois Lane in Man of Steel, Batman v Superman: Dawn of Justice, Justice League
- Heather Holloway in Thank You for Smoking
- Erin Sadelstein in Jack and Jill
- Bobbie Jo Chapman in Logan
- Joey Potter in Dawson's Creek
- Emma Pillsbury in Glee
- Grace Winslow in The Smurfs, The Smurfs 2
- Grace Van Pelt in The Mentalist
- Giselle in Enchanted
- Mary in The Muppets
- April in The Hot Chick
- Zoey in The Dictator
- Hannah Lewis in My Super Ex-Girlfriend
- Wendy Franklin in Take Me Home Tonight
- Christy Plunkett in Mom
- Taylor Townsend in The O.C.
- Peggy Carter in Agent Carter
- Evelyn Robin in Christopher Robin
- Olive in Goodbye Christopher Robin
- Casey in 27 Dresses
- Connie Baker in Mona Lisa Smile
- Becca Crane in Vampires Suck
- Betty Draper in Mad Men
- Melissa Chartres in The Last Man on Earth
- Jade in The Hangover Part III
- Thea Queen / Speedy in Arrowverse
- Jo Wilson and Brooke Stadler in Grey's Anatomy
- Chantal Anne Harper in Nicky, Ricky, Dicky & Dawn
- Caroline Channing in 2 Broke Girls
- Amanda Tanen in Ugly Betty
- Janis Hawk in FlashForward
- Gloria Mendoza in Orange Is the New Black
- Malcolm in Malcolm in the Middle
- Carla Espinosa in Scrubs
- Topanga Matthews in Girl Meets World
- Anya Jenkins in Buffy the Vampire Slayer
- Ella Lopez in Lucifer
- Melissa Peyser in The In-Laws
- Rachel Jansen in Forgetting Sarah Marshall
- Kate Libby / Acid Burn in Hackers
- Liz Parker in Roswell
- Mystique in Epic Movie
- Stacie Blake in Sleepover
- Stacey in The Visit
- Emily Newton in Beethoven's 2nd
- Haley Robinson in Big Mommas: Like Father, Like Son
- Chloe Sullivan in Smallville

=== Video games ===
- Tweety in Bugs Bunny & Taz: Time Busters, Taz: Wanted, Looney Tunes: Back in Action
- Rachel Dawes in Batman Begins
- Snow White in Disneyland Adventures
