= Cesare Canevari =

Italian actor, director and screenwriter

- Born: 13 October 1927; Milan, Italy
- Died: 25 October 2012 (aged 85); Milan, Italy
- Occupation: Director

Cesare Canevari (13 October 1927 – 25 October 2012) was an Italian actor, director and screenwriter.

== Life and career ==
Born in Milan, Canevari began his career shortly after World War II as a stage actor, occasionally also appearing in films in minor roles. Variously referred to as "a genius ahead of his time", "a master of genre cinema" and "one of the less labelable directors of Italian genre cinema", he directed nine films between 1964 and 1983. Often characterized by an unusual style, his films ranged through different genres, including noir, Nazisploitation, Spaghetti Western, giallo and melodrama. His films generally were produced and shot in Milan. His final film was Delitto carnale (1983)

== Selected filmography ==
- Un tango dalla Russia (1965)
- Agente Segreto 070: Thunderbay Missione Grasshopper (1966)
- Una jena in cassaforte (1968)
- A Man for Emmanuelle (1969)
- Matalo! (1970)
- Last Orgy of the Third Reich (1977)
- Delitto carnale (1983)
