= Luigi Alberto Franzoni =

Luigi Franzoni
- Born: Luigi Alberto Franzoni; November 24, 1965 (age 60); Merano, South Tyrol, Italy
- Occupations: Professor, Economist
- Notable work: Introduzione all'economia del diritto, Il Mulino, 2003

Luigi Alberto Franzoni is a full professor at the University of Bologna, Italy. He is a noted economics scholar in the field of law and economics, and has published extensively, especially in the fields of economic theory of settlements, law enforcement, tax amnesties, and intellectual property. As of 2015, he is currently acting as Mundus Director of the international Ph.D. program “European Doctorate in Law and Economics”. In September 2014 he was elected as the president of the European Association of Law and Economics (EALE) in the 31st annual conference of EALE in Aix-En-Province. He is currently acting as Mundus Director of the international Ph.D. programme “European Doctorate in Law and Economics” for Bologna, Hamburg, Rotterdam, and Mumbai.
