= Franco Latini =

Italian voice actor (1927–1991)

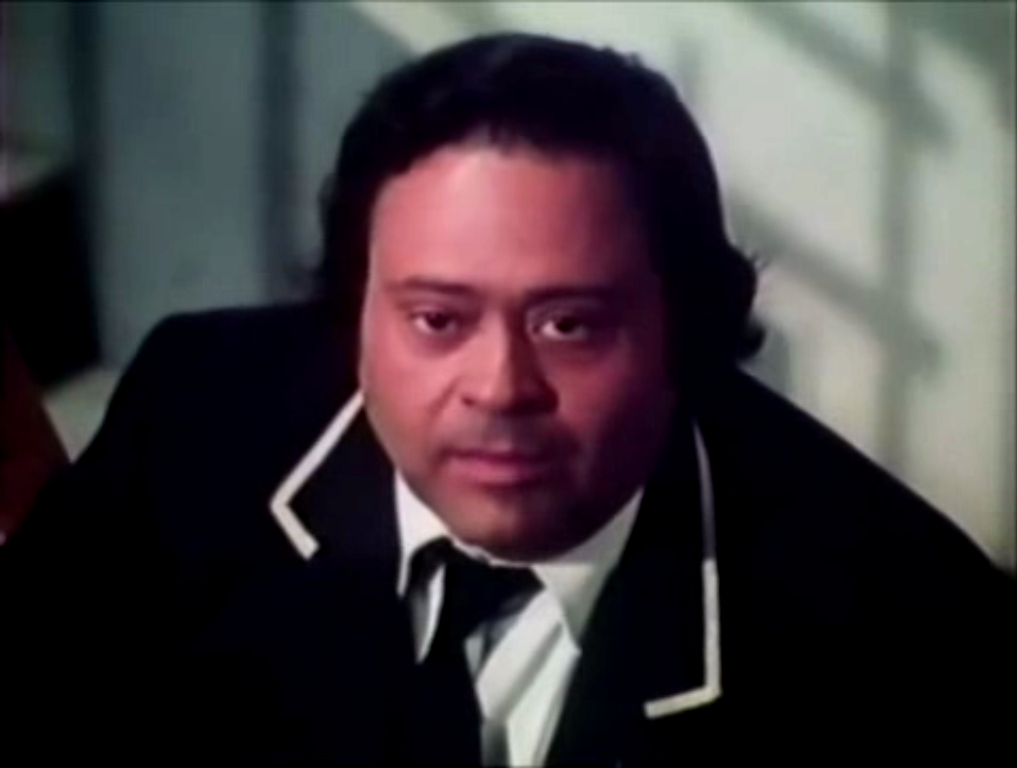
- Latini in The Black Maid (1976)
- Born: 12 September 1927; Pomezia, Italy
- Died: 2 February 1991 (aged 63); Rome, Italy
- Occupations: Actor; voice actor; dubbing director
- Years active: 1953–1991
- Children: Laura; Fabrizio; Ilaria

Franco Latini (12 September 1927 – 2 February 1991) was an Italian actor and voice actor. He was considered one of the top voice dubbers for animated films and cartoons in Italy.

== Biography ==
Born in Pomezia, which is in Rome, Latini started out working as a singer in nightclubs in the early 1950s, then he went on to act in radio comedies and theatre plays. In 1953, he starred in the film The World Condemns Them. Latini's filmography includes comedies such as the 1966 musical film Mondo pazzo... gente matta! starring Silvana Pampanini, the 1976 film The Black Maid starring Carla Brait and spaghetti westerns such as Blue Summer and Johnny Hamlet.

Latini was heavily active as a voice actor. He dubbed Stan Laurel in several redubs of Laurel and Hardy shorts and films in which he was paired with Carlo Croccolo. He also dubbed characters in many animated productions: he was the Italian voice of Skeletor and other characters in the first season of He-Man and the Masters of the Universe and from 1983 until 1988 he was the primary Italian voice of Donald Duck. Latini voiced most of the characters in the Italian editions of the Looney Tunes, various Muppets in The Muppet Show, Tom, the Cat from Tom & Jerry and the namesake character in the Van Beuren Studios Tom and Jerry series.

Latini founded his own dubbing company in the late 1970s, which was active until the end of the '80s. In 1981, he lost one of his legs in an accident, which rendered him unable to perform on screen. After that, he devoted himself exclusively to dubbing.

=== Personal life ===
Latini had three children, daughters Laura and Ilaria from his marriage with dialogue writer Maria Pinto and son Fabrizio from his relationship with actress Piera Vidale. All three followed in Latini's footsteps.

== Death ==
Latini died of a stroke at the Agostino Gemelli University Polyclinic in Rome around the evening of 2 February 1991, at the age of 63; it was also the 21st birthday of his son Fabrizio Vidale. He was later interred at Campo Verano.

== Filmography ==
=== Cinema ===
| Year | Title | Role | Notes |
|---|---|---|---|
| 1953 | The World Condemns Them | Double Bass Player | Uncredited |
| 1958 | Serenatella sciuè sciuè | Barone Paolino | |
| 1963 | The Motorized Women | Plump Man with a Hat | Uncredited |
| 1964 | Bullet in the Flesh | Bob Rusky | |
| 1965 | Blue Summer | Oliveras | |
| 1966 | Mondo pazzo... gente matta! | Paolo Pizziconi | |
| 1967 | For Love... for Magic... | | |
| 1968 | Johnny Hamlet | Gravedigger | |
| 1968 | May God Forgive You... But I Won't | Undertaker | |
| 1972 | Jus primae noctis | | |
| 1976 | La cameriera nera | Placido | |

=== Television ===
| Year | Title | Role | Notes |
|---|---|---|---|
| 1969 | Stasera Fernandel | Il capostazione | TV miniseries, 6th episode (1969) |
| 1973 | Qui squadra mobile | Padrone | |
| 1974 | L'avventura di un povero cristiano | Cerbicca | TV play |

== Voice work ==
=== Miscellaneous ===
- SuperGulp! - Enrico La Talpa (Henry, the mole from Lupo Alberto), Jak Mandolino, Pop Corn [it], Carletto Spaccabue, Commendatore, Sturmtruppen narrator and other characters
- Provolino (1969-1970)
- Lobster for Breakfast (1976) - Radio voice
- La liceale, il diavolo e l'acqua santa (1979) - Cry of the newborn

=== Dubbing ===
==== Animation ====
- Various characters in Rudolph and Frosty's Christmas in July, Looney Tunes, Merrie Melodies, The Looney Looney Looney Bugs Bunny Movie, Bugs Bunny's 3rd Movie: 1001 Rabbit Tales, Daffy Duck's Fantastic Island, The Flintstones, Kimba the White Lion
- Pete (1981-1988), Donald Duck (1983-1988) and Goofy (1984-1988) in Disney Productions
- Top Cat in Top Cat, Yogi's Treasure Hunt, Top Cat and the Beverly Hills Cats
- Daffy Duck in The Bugs Bunny/Road Runner Movie, Bugs Bunny's Howl-oween Special, Bugs Bunny's Valentine (first Italian dub)
- Muttley in Wacky Races, Dastardly and Muttley in Their Flying Machines
- Sylvester the Cat in Bugs Bunny's Howl-oween Special, Bugs Bunny's Easter Funnies
- Popeye, Poopdeck Pappy, Lizzie and the Sea Hag in Popeye and Son
- Skeletor, Orko, Battle Cat/Cringer and King Randor in He-Man and the Masters of the Universe (season 1)
- Bobo and Rock Slag in The Man Called Flintstone
- Grape Ape and Beegle Beagle in The Great Grape Ape Show
- Gus Holiday and Brutus the Lion in The Roman Holidays
- Luke in The Rescuers
- Tom in Tom & Jerry
- Tom in Tom and Jerry (Van Beuren)
- Mr. Jinks in Pixie and Dixie and Mr. Jinks
- Speedy Gonzales in Bugs Bunny's Howl-oween Special
- Porky Pig in Bugs Bunny's Easter Funnies (first Italian dub)
- Pepé Le Pew in Bugs Bunny's Valentine (first Italian dub)
- Ataru's Father in Urusei Yatsura (1st voice)
- Spider Monster in Scooby-Doo! and the Reluctant Werewolf
- Hair Bear in Help!... It's the Hair Bear Bunch!
- Punkin' Puss in Punkin' Puss & Mushmouse

==== Live action ====
- Stan Laurel in Laurel and Hardy (1968-1970 redubs)
- Gonzo, Scooter, Zoot, Floyd Pepper, Statler, Beaker, Swedish Chef, Lew Zealand, Dr. Julius Strangepork, and Pops in The Muppet Show
- Herr Schmidt and Alpino in Pappa e ciccia (a.k.a. Two of a Kind)
- Archie Bunker in All in the Family
- Moe Gelly in Once Upon a Time in America
- Benjy Benjamin in It's a Mad, Mad, Mad, Mad World
- El Nebuloso in Yellowbeard
- Tushin in War and Peace
- Albert C. Provo in The Green Berets
- Second Griner in Deliverance
- Photographer in Little Fauss and Big Halsy
- Eugene in Honky Tonk Freeway
- Lucius in The Beauty Jungle
