= I tabù n. 2 =

- Directed by: Romolo Marcellini
- Written by: Giancarlo Del Re (writer)
- Release date: 1965
- Running time: 88 minutes
- Country: Italy
- Language: Italian

I tabù n. 2 (also released as Macabro) is a 1965 Italian documentary film directed by Romolo Marcellini.
