= La violenza dei dannati =

- Directed by: Giovanni Roccardi
- Release date: 1965
- Country: Italy
- Language: Italian

La violenza dei dannati is a 1965 Italian film directed by Giovanni Roccardi.

== Cast ==
- Fernando Andreoli
- Jake LaMotta
- Roberto Parisini
- Teresa Pellati
- Frank Petrella
- Enrico Salvatore
- Renato Tassi
