= Sword of the Empire =

- Directed by: Sergio Grieco
- Screenplay by: Fulvio Tului
- Produced by: Giorgio Marzelli
- Starring: Lang Jeffries; Jose Greci; Enzo Terascio; Howard Ross
- Cinematography: Romolo Garroni
- Edited by: Enzo Alfonzi
- Music by: Guido Robuschi; Gian Stellari
- Production company: Assia International Film
- Release date: 21 October 1964 (Italy)
- Running time: 81 minutes
- Country: Italy

Sword of the Empire (Italian: Una spada per l'impero) is a 1964 Italian peplum film directed by Sergio Grieco.

== Plot ==
In AD 190 Rome is in terror. The barbarians have crossed the Alps leaving Rome under threat. Emperor Commodus is becoming increasingly hateful. Christians are being persecuted and the situation is becoming worse. Only one man can help. Consul Quintus Marcus is allied with legionnaires, gladiators and Christians and decides to generate an insurrection against the emperor. His fellow officers say they will fight with him but Rome needs Quintus Marcus, "the sword of the people!!!"

== Cast ==
- Lang Jeffries as Quintus Marcus, Roman Consul
- José Greci as Nissia
- Enzo Tarascio as Emperor Commodus
- Howard Ross as Leto (as Renato Rossini)
- Mila Stanic as Marcia
- Angela Angelucci as Omah
- Giuseppe Addobbati as Pertinacius
- Ignazio Leone as Tigerio

== Release ==
Sword of the Empire was released in Italy on 21 October 1964.
