= Cristo in India =

- Directed by: Rinaldo Dal Fabbro
- Release date: 1965
- Country: Italy
- Language: Italian

Cristo in India is a 1965 Italian film directed by Rinaldo Dal Fabbro.
