= L'antimiracolo =

1965 Italian documentary film by Elio Piccon

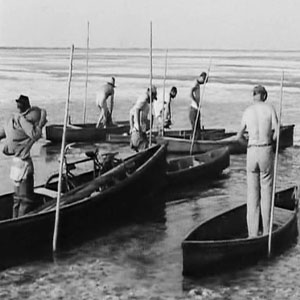
- Scene from the film
- Directed by: Elio Piccon
- Produced by: Franco Cristaldi, Turi Vasile
- Music by: Carlo Rustichelli
- Release date: 1965
- Running time: 87 minutes
- Country: Italy
- Language: Italian

L'antimiracolo is a 1965 Italian documentary film directed by Elio Piccon. It won the Golden Lion Award at the 26th Venice Film Festival.

== Synopsis ==
The events unfold in San Nicandro Garganico, a backward and impoverished town, also bordered by a lake. The plot follows two stories of fishermen. The first, with money earned abroad, aims to build a new sandalo. The sandalo is a boat with which the fisherman Nicandro will attempt to navigate and open, in the muddy and algae-infested waters of the lagoon, a "path" for fishing. In the local dialect, this path is called carrara. Extracting carrare by chance means having a good spot to cast nets, ensuring an abundance of food. However, Nicandro's fate will be cruel: under the sun, immersed in the mud, he loses his life desperately drowning in the lagoon.

The second fisherman, Zaruccio, tries to change his life in an almost absurd way. With the help of his family, he attempts to build a field from the lagoon. After months of hard work, where he brings soil tirelessly, the small field emerges from the water. However, even in this case, a tragic fate befalls him. Seasonal storms arrive, and in a single day, the field is destroyed. Once again, nature prevails over man's hard work, and anger, pain, and tears take over.
