= Alberto De Rossi =

Italian football manager (born 1957)

Alberto de Rossi
Personal information
- Date of birth: 9 September 1957 (age 69)
- Place of birth: Rome, Italy
- Position: Defender

Team information
- Current team: Roma Primavera (head of youth coach development)

Youth career
- 1973–1974: Ostia Mare
- 1974–1977: Roma

Senior career*
Years	Team	Apps	(Gls)
1973–1974	Ostia Mare	1	(0)
1977–1978	Piacenza	37	(1)
1978–1979	Mantova	32	(0)
1979–1980	Siena	33	(2)
1980–1981	Montevarchi	31	(1)
1981–1983	Prato	63	(5)
1983–1986	Livorno	85	(2)
1986–1988	Lucchese	48	(0)
1988–1989	San Marino	23	(0)
1990–1991	Sarzanese	26	(0)
1991–1992	Ostia Mare	29	(0)
Total		408	(11)

Managerial career
- 1997–2003: Roma (Youth Sector)
- 2003–2022: Roma Primavera
- * Club domestic league appearances and goals

Alberto de Rossi (born 9 September 1957) is an Italian football manager and former player. Serving between 2003 and 2022, he is the longest lasting manager in the history of Roma's U19 side.

== Career ==
He made his senior debut at 16 for Ostia Mare, and after leaving Roma’s youth sector, he had a modest career in the lower leagues of Italian football, playing in Serie C, Serie C1, Serie C2 and Interregionale, before retiring in 1992.

From 1997 to 2003, he took the role of manager for many sides of Roma's youth sector, before taking over the Primavera side for the next 18 years. On 17 July 2021, he renewed his contract with Roma for another year, extending his stay for a 19th season.

In June 2022, De Rossi finally left his position as Under-19 manager and was subsequently appointed as the club's new head of youth coach development.

== Personal life ==
Alberto is the father of Italian former footballer Daniele De Rossi.

== Honours ==
=== Player ===
Livorno

- Serie C2: 1983–84

=== Manager ===
Roma Primavera

- Campionato Primavera 1: 2004–05, 2010–11, 2016–17
- Coppa Italia Primavera: 2011–12, 2016–17
- Supercoppa Primavera: 2012, 2016
