= 1965 in Italian television =

This is a list of Italian television related events from 1965.

== Events ==
- 6 January: Claudio Villa wins Napoli contro tutti (1964 edition of Canzonissima) with O’ sole mio.
- 30 January: Bobby Solo and The New Christy Minstrels win the Sanremo Music Festival (hosted by Mike Bongiorno).with Se piangi, se ridi The festival is the most seen show of the year, with 17,2 million viewiers.
- 16 February: Telespazio, the Italian estate for the communications satellite, adheres to Intelsat.
- 20 March: The 10th Eurovision Song Contest is held at the Sala di Concerto della RAI in Naples. Luxembourg wins the contest with the song "Poupée de cire, poupée de son", performed by France Gall.
- 25 March : in the entertainment magazine Anteprima, The Beatles appear for the first time at the Italian television.
- 2 May: first transmission between America and Europe on the Early Bird satellite. RAI participates broadcasting images of Pope Paul VI blessing the crowd in St. Peter's Square and of the Mont Blanc Tunnel, nearing completion.
- July 16: RAI broadcasts live the opening of the Mont Blanc tunnel.

== Debuts ==
=== Serials ===
- Le avventure di Laura Storm (Laura Storm's adventures) – comedy-mystery serial by Camillo Mastrocinque, written by Leo Chiosso, with Lauretta Masiero as a dynamic journalist-detective and Carlo Giuffrè as her director-fiancée; 2 seasons.

=== Newa and educational ===
The news program launches a magazine dedicated to local realities (Cronache italiane, Italian chronicles) and a weekly in-depth program (Speciale TG1, still on the air). Furthermore, various new sport magazine are inaugurated (TG1 Sport, Domenica sportiva estate, Sprint: inchieste sullo sport).

- Giramondo – newsreel for children, realized in collaboration with the foreign televisions.
- Penelope - magazine for the women, hosted by Caterina Guzzanti.

=== Variety ===
- Jeux sans frontières - international game show; 30 seasons.
- Mare contro mare (Sea against sea) – summer game show with a challenge between the cities of the Tyrrenian and Adriatic Sea; hosted by Aroldo Tieri and Silvana Pampanini. It got a second edition in 1998.

== Television shows ==
=== Drama ===
- Il marito geloso (The eternal husband) and Il giocatore (The gambler) – by Edmo Fenoglio, from the Fyodor Dostoevsky's stories, both with Warner Bentivenga and Tino Carraro.
- Racconti della resistenza italiana (Italian resistance tales): cycle of TV-movies, care of Raffaele La Capria, realized for the twentieth anniversary of the Liberation of Italy. It includes: La strada più lunga (The longest road) by Nelo Risi, from the autobiographical book of Davide Lajolo, with Gian Maria Volonté (a fascist officer chooses to adhere to Resistance) and L'ammiraglio (The admiral) by Anton Giulio Majano, from a Mario Tobino's novel, with Renzo Ricci (the eroical sacrifice of an aged Marine officer).
- Agamennon by Vittorio Alfieri, directed by Renzo Giovampietro, with Andrea Bosic in the title role and Marisa Belli as Clytemnestra.
- Andromache by Euripides, directed by Mario Ferrero, with Anna Miserocchi in the title role.

=== Miniseries ===
- La donna di fiori (The queen of clubs) – by Anton Giulio Majano, with Ubaldo Lay (as Lieutenant Sheridan), Andrea Checchi and Luigi Vannucchi; in 6 episodes. First of the four “Sheridan's queen”, miniseries with the popular detective as protagonist and titles inspired by the playing cards.
- Il vecchio e il faro (The old man and the lighthouse) – for children, by Angelo D’Alessandro, with Fosco Giachetti and Roberto Chevalier; 4 episodes. A young boy spends the summer holyday with his uncle, lighthouse warden.

==== Period dramas ====
- Questa sera parla Mark Twain (Mark Twain speaks tonight) – biopic by Daniele D’Anza, written by Diego Fabbri, with Paolo Stoppa in the title role and Rina Morelli as Olivia Langdon; 7 episodes. The life of the writer is mixed with scenes from his novels and tales.
- David Copperfield, by Anton Giulio Majano, from the Charles Dickens’ novel, with Giancarlo Giannini in the title role, in 8 episodes; extraordinary public success, with 15 million viewiers.
- Scaramouche – by Daniele D’Anza, with Domenico Modugno (author of the music too) and Carla Gravina; in five episodes. First Italian musical fiction, about the life of Tiberio Fiorilli.
- Vita di Dante (Life of Dante) – by Vittorio Cottafavi, with Giorgio Albertazzi (Dante Alighieri) and Loretta Goggi (Beatrice), script by Giorgio Prosperi; 3 episodes.
- La figlia del capitano (The captain's daughter) – by Leonardo Cortese, from the Pushkin's novel, with Umberto Orsini, Lucilla Morlacchi and Amedeo Nazzari (debuting in television) in the role of Pugachev; 6 episodes.
- Resurrection, from the Tolstoj's novel, directed by Franco Enriquez, with Valeria Moriconi and Alberto Lupo; 6 episodes.

=== Variety ===
- La trottola (The spinning top) – variety hosted by Corrado (already host of the radio version) and Sandra Mondaini; 2 seasons.
- Le nostre serate (Our evenings) – by Carla Ragionieri; musical show with Giorgio Gaber.
- La prova del nove (Casting out nines) – name of the 1965 edition of Canzonissima, hosted by Corrado Mantoni, Walter Chiari and the Kessler sisters; the winner is Gianni Morandi with Non son degno di te.

Besides the traditional varietyr, RAI realizes also musical shows aimed to the younger audience.

- Adriano clan – directed by Gianfranco Bettetini, with Adriano Celentano and other young singers of his record company.
- Pick up – hosted by Walter Chiari.
- Stasera Rita - with Rita Pavone and Bice Valori (playing the singer's mother).

=== News and educational ===
- Gesù mio fratello (Jesus my brother), La donna nella resistenza (Women in the resistance), Il giorno della pace (The day of the peace), Philippe Petain, processo a Vichy (Philippe Petain, process to Vichy) – documentaries by Liliana Cavani. Philippe Petain is awarded at the 26th Venice International Film Festival as best TV documentary.
- L’età del ferro (Iron Age) – docufiction about the role of iron in civilization history, directed by Renzo Rossellini, supervised by his father Roberto and sponsored by Italsider; five episodes. First Rossellini's experiment of didactic television.
- Albert Schweitzer, le grand docteur – reportage from Lambaréné, realized by Sergio Zavoli three months before the doctor's death.

== Ending this year ==
- Johnny 7

== Births ==
- 19 February - Veronica Pivetti, actress
- 1 April - Simona Ventura, TV host and X Factor judge
- 17 May - Claudia Koll, actress
- 10 August - Lorella Cuccarini, singer, TV host and actress

== See also ==
- List of Italian films of 1965
