= Lang Jeffries =

Canadian actor (1930–1987)

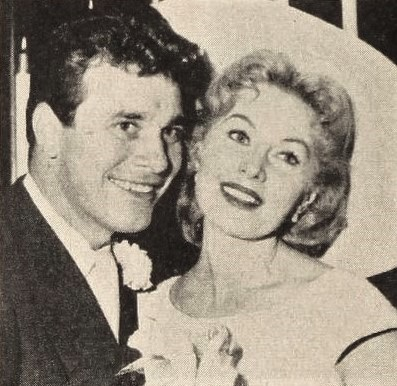
- Lang Jeffries with Rhonda Fleming, 1960
- Born: June 7, 1930; Ontario, Canada
- Died: February 12, 1987 (aged 56); Huntington Beach, California, U.S.
- Occupation: Actor
- Spouses: Rhonda Fleming (m. 1960; div. 1962) Gail Harris (m. 1966, divorced): Mary Jeffries (m. 197?)

Lang Jeffries (June 7, 1930 – February 12, 1987) was a Canadian actor.

== Biography ==
From 1958 to 1960, Jeffries starred as Skip Johnson in the adventure television series Rescue 8.

He starred in several American films in the 1960s, including Don't Knock the Twist (1962).

Jeffries starred as Vibio in the foreign film, La Rivolta degli schiavi, or The Revolt of the Slaves, with his wife Rhonda Fleming cast as Fabiola. Jeffries persuaded producers to cast him in the role after he traveled to Rome with his wife and discovered that the leading male role had not been cast. After he and Fleming traveled to Madrid to film, they discovered that the director, Nunzio Malasomma, would not speak to either of them, so Jeffries directed them both.

He starred in other films set in classic Rome such as Sword of the Empire (1964) and Fire Over Rome (1965) as well as Requiem for a Gringo, a Spaghetti Western.

=== Personal life ===
Jeffries married Rhonda Fleming at The Little Church of the West in Las Vegas in April 1960. They divorced in January 1962.

On August 13, 1966, while living in Rome, Jeffries married Gail Harris, the mother of John Paul Getty III. Actor Brett Halsey was the best man and his then-wife, German actress Heidi Bruehl, was the maid of honor. Jeffries and Harris later divorced, and Jeffries went into real estate and boat sales in the US.

Jeffries died on February 12, 1987, in Huntington Beach, California, after a bout with cancer. He was survived by his third wife, mother, and brother.

== Selected film credits ==
- The Revolt of the Slaves (1960)
- Don't Knock the Twist (1962)
- Alone Against Rome (1962)
- Sword of the Empire (1964)
- Fire Over Rome (1965)
- Agente X 1-7 operación Océano (1965)
- Z7 Operation Rembrandt (1966)
- Spies Strike Silently (1966)
- Special Code: Assignment Lost Formula (1966)
- The Killer Lacks a Name (1966)
- The Spy with a Cold Nose (1966)
- Mexican Slayride (1967)
- Mission Stardust (1967)
- Lotus Flowers for Miss Quon (1967)
- The Hotheads (1967)
- Requiem for a Gringo (1968)
- The Last Roman (1968)
- The Junkman (1982) – Arthur Wheeler
