= Carl Möhner =

Austrian actor (1921–2005)

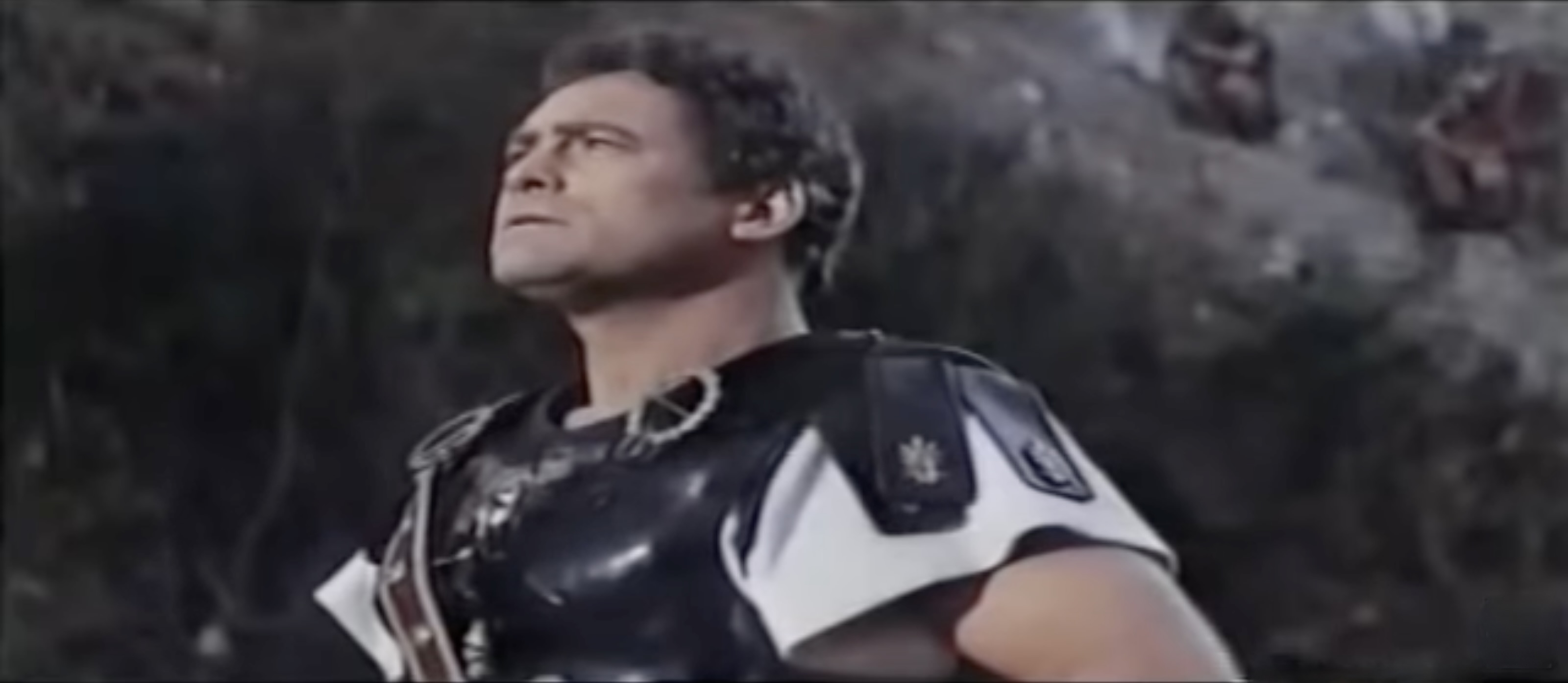
- Möhner in The Fall of Rome (1963)
- Born: 11 August 1921; Vienna, Austria
- Died: 14 January 2005 (aged 83); McAllen, Texas, USA
- Occupation: Actor
- Years active: 1949–1976

Carl Martin Rudolf Möhner (11 August 1921 – 14 January 2005) was an Austrian film actor, director, screenwriter and painter. He appeared in more than 40 films between 1949 and 1976. His most famous roles were as Jo "le Suédois" in the 1955 French heist film Rififi and as Captain of Battleship Bismarck in the film Sink the Bismarck!

Möhner retired from filming in 1976. He married Wilma Langhamer, a German painter in 1978. In 1979 the couple settled down in McAllen, Texas, where Carl died from Parkinson's disease in 2005. He had two sons, Gunther and Gernot (also actors) from a previous relationship.

== Selected filmography ==
- Vagabonds (1949) – (uncredited)
- Anna Louise and Anton (1953) – Höllriegel, Rennfahrer
- The Last Bridge (1954) – Martin Berger
- Rififi (1955) – Jo "le Suédois"
- The Vulture Wally (1956) – Bärenjosef
- Where the Ancient Forests Rustle (1956) – Klaus Baumgartner
- He Who Must Die (1957) – Lukas
- Weißer Holunder (1957) – Gerhard
- The Camp on Blood Island (1958) – Piet Van Elst
- The Key (1958) – Van Barger (scenes deleted)
- Passionate Summer (1958) – Louis
- Behind the Mask (1958) – Carl Romek
- Moonwolf (1959) – Peter Holm
- Sink the Bismarck! (1960) – Captain Lindemann
- The Challenge (1960) – Kristy
- The Kitchen (1961) – Peter
- Inshalla, Razzia am Bosporus (1962) – Inspektor Peter Hartwig
- The Fall of Rome (1963) – Marcus
- Cave of the Living Dead (1964) – The Village Doctor
- The Last Gun (1964) – Guitar
- L'uomo di Toledo (1965) – Don Ramiro
- Doc, Hands of Steel (1965) – Doc MacGregor
- Gold Train (1965) – Jeff Benson
- The Murderer with the Silk Scarf (1966) – Boris Garrett
- Carmen, Baby (1967) – Medicio
- Hell Is Empty (1967) – Carl Schultz
- Assignment K (1968) – Inspector
- Death and Diamonds (1968) – Bloom
- Radhapura – Endstation der Verdammten (1968) – Mac
- The Last Mercenary (1968) – Steinmann
- Birdie (1971) – Birdie's Father
- Zu dumm zum... (1971)
- Der neue heiße Sex-Report (1971) – Hübner (uncredited)
- Eine Armee Gretchen (1973) – Felix Kuhn
- Ein Käfer auf Extratour (1973) – Ivan Leskovich
- Callan (1974) – Schneider
- Užička republika (1974) – Generalmajor
- Wanted: Babysitter (1975) – Cyrus Franklin
- Derrick (1975, Season 2, Episode 12: "Alarm auf Revier 12") – Oberinspektor Matthes
- Une femme à sa fenêtre (1976) – von Pahlen
