= Ida Galli =

Italian actress (born 1939)

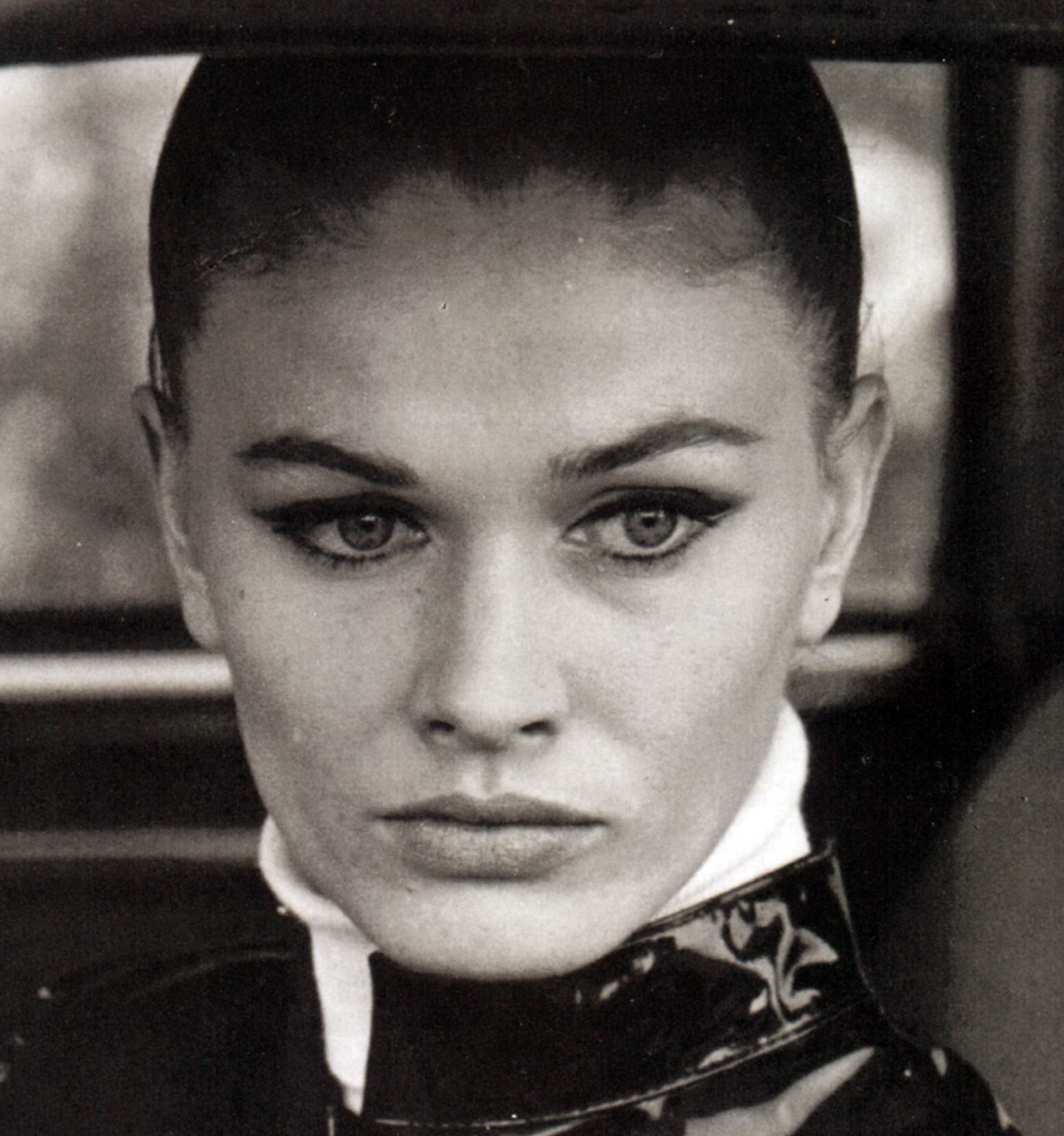
- Galli in the movie The Sweet Body of Deborah (1968)
- Born: 8 October 1939 (age 86); Sestola, Modena, Kingdom of Italy
- Other names: Arianna; Evelyn Stewart; Isli Oberon
- Occupation: Actress
- Years active: 1959–1990

Ida Galli (born 8 October 1939) is an Italian film actress best known for her roles in spaghetti Western and giallo films in the 1960s and 1970s. Galli has appeared under several pseudonyms, including Arianna, Evelyn Stewart and Isli Oberon.

Extremely prolific, some of her most notable roles include La Dolce Vita (1960), Hercules in the Haunted World (1961), The Leopard (1963), The Whip and the Body (1965), Blood for a Silver Dollar (1965), Adiós gringo (1965), Django Shoots First (1966), Special Mission Lady Chaplin (1966), The Sweet Body of Deborah (1968), The Weekend Murders (1970), The Case of the Scorpion's Tail (1971), The Bloodstained Butterfly (1971), Knife of Ice (1972), Footprints on the Moon (1975), and The Psychic (1977).

== Life and career ==
Ida Galli was born in Sestola, Italy. Her date of birth has variously been given as 9 April 1942 and 8 October 1939. After finishing school, Galli moved to Rome to find work as an actress. Galli's first film appearance was in 1959, under the pseudonym Arianna, in Nel blu, dipinto di blu, directed by Piero Tellini. This role caught the attention of Federico Fellini, who cast Galli in a small part in his 1960 film La dolce vita.

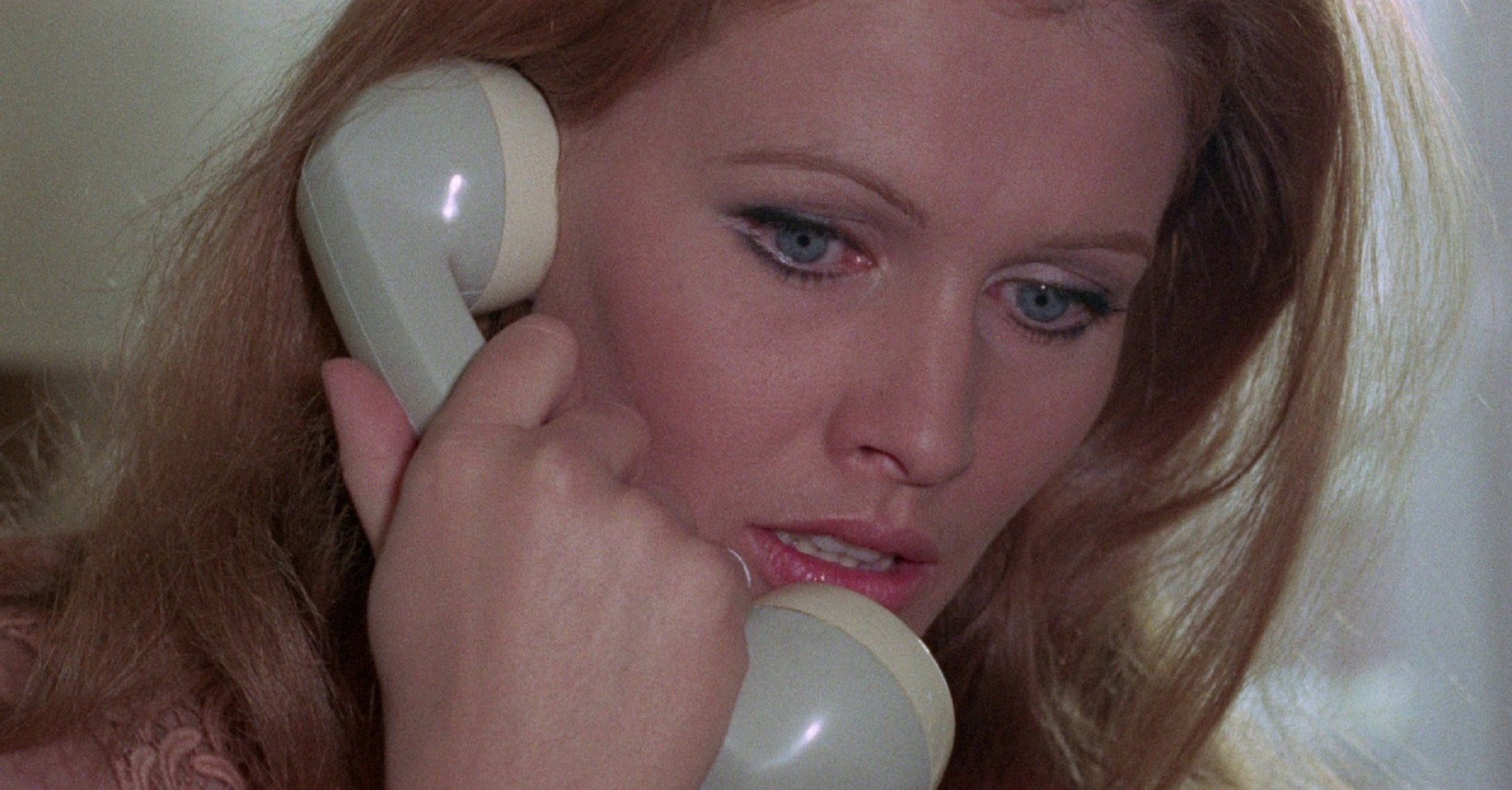
Galli in a scene from The Case of the Scorpion's Tail (1971)

Galli has since appeared in over forty-five film roles. One of her significant roles was the part of Carolina in Luchino Visconti's 1963 film adaptation of the novel Il Gattopardo (The Leopard). She last appeared in 1990's Con i piedi per aria, directed by Vincenzo Verdecchi.

Although her early roles were usually billed under her real name, Galli most often used the pseudonym Evelyn Stewart. However, her role in Mario Bava's 1963 film La frusta e il corpo was credited as Isli Oberon.

Several of Galli's roles have been in the spaghetti Western genre, beginning with Un dollaro bucato, Adiós gringo and Perché uccidi ancora in 1965. Galli has also featured in several giallo films, including Lucio Fulci's Sette note in nero, Umberto Lenzi's Il coltello di ghiaccio and Sergio Martino's La coda dello scorpione. Enrico Lancia, author of the Dizionario del cinema italiano series, describes Galli as being at her best in dramatic roles, but notes that her largest success came as a result of adopting the Evelyn Stewart pseudonym and focussing on roles in genre films.

Galli's son, Alessandro Cocco, briefly acted in films, appearing with his mother in Umberto Lenzi's Syndicate Sadists.

== Filmography ==
Year	Title	Role	Notes
1959	Nel blu dipinto di blu	Donata	As Arianna
1960	La Dolce Vita	Débutante of the Year	
1960	A Mistress for the Summer		
1960	Messalina	Silvia	As Arianna Galli
1961	Ghosts of Rome	Carla	
1961	Legge di guerra	Danica	
1961	Hercules in the Haunted World	Meiazotide	
1961	Madame Sans-Gêne	July	
1961	Le italiane e l'amore		Anthology film, section Il prezzo dell'amore
1963	The Fall of Rome	Licia	As Evelyn Stewart
1963	The Leopard	Carolina	
1963	The Whip and the Body	Katia	As Isli Oberon
1964	Rome Against Rome	Rhama	As Evelyn Stewart
1965	Heroes of Fort Worth	Nelly Bonnet	As Priscila Steele
1965	Blood for a Silver Dollar	Judy O'Hara	As Evelyn Stewart
1965	Perché uccidi ancora	Judy McDougall	As Evelyn Stewart
1965	Adiós gringo	Lucy Tillson	As Evelyn Stewart
1966	Sette magnifiche pistole	Coralie	As Evelyn Stewart
1966	Special Mission Lady Chaplin	Constance Day	As Evelyn Stewart
1966	Rififi in Amsterdam	Mrs. Fischer	As Evelyn Stewart
1966	Django Shoots First	Jessica	As Evelyn Stewart
1966	Adiós gringo	Lucy Tilson	
1967	Mexican Slayride		Uncredited
1967	Assassination	Barbara	As Evelyn Stewart
1967	Garden of Delights	Carla	As Evelyn Stewart
1968	The Sweet Body of Deborah	Suzanne Boileau	As Evelyn Stewart
1968	Il suo nome gridava vendetta	Luisa	As Evelyn Stewart
1968	Be Sick... It's Free	Anna Maria	As Evelyn Stewart
1968	No Graves on Boot Hill	Dolores	As Evelyn Stewart
1968	Gatling Gun	Belinda Boyd	As Evelyn Stewart
1969	La battaglia del deserto	Jean	As Evelyn Stewart
1969	Eagles Over London	Flight Officer Meg Jones	As Evelyn Stewart
1969	Il prof. Dott. Guido Tersilli, primario della clinica Villa Celeste convenzionata con le mutue	Anna Maria Tersilli	As Evelyn Stewart
1970	The Unholy Four	Shiela	As Evelyn Stewart
1970	The Weekend Murders	Isabelle	As Evelyn Stewart
1970	Queens of Evil	Bibiana	As Evelyn Stewart
1970	Strada senza uscita		As Evelyn Stewart
1971	Four Gunmen of the Holy Trinity	Julia	
1971	The Case of the Scorpion's Tail	Lisa Baumer	As Evelyn Stewart
1971	The Bloodstained Butterfly	Maria Marchi	As Evelyn Stewart
1972	Grazie signore p...	Anna	As Evelyn Stewart
1972	La mansión de la niebla	Martha Clinton	As Evelyn Stewart
1972	Il coltello di ghiaccio	Jenny Ascott	As Evelyn Stewart
1972	Spirits of Death	Marialè	As Evelyn Stewart
1973	Man Called Invincible	Miss Marlene	As Evelyn Stewart
1973	The Little Cowboy	Yumurcak's mother	As Evelyn Stewart
1974	La badessa di Castro	Margherita	As Evelyn Stewart
1975	Diagnosi	Luisa Cardona	Episode: "L'avvertimento" as Evelyn Stewart
1975	Footprints on the Moon	Mary	As Evelyn Stewart
1975	Cagliostro	Serafina Cagliostro	As Evelyn Stewart
1975	The Cursed Medallion	Jill Perkins	As Evelyn Stewart
1975	Syndicate Sadists	Signora Marsili	As Evelyn Stewart
1976	Povero Cristo	Giorgio's mother	
1976	Per amore	Alberto's Assistant in Venice	Uncredited
1976	The Two Orphans	The Countess	
1977	Sette note in nero	Gloria Ducci	As Evelyn Stewart
1977	Weapons of Death	Lucia Parisi	
1978	The Greatest Battle	Miss Scott	As Evelyn Stewart
1989	Arabella Black Angel	Martha Veronesi	As Evelyn Stewart
1989	Fratelli d'Italia		
1990	Con i piedi per aria		(final film role)

== Bibliography ==
- Lancia, Enrico (2003). Dizionario del cinema italiano: Le attrici dal 1930 ai giorni nostri. Gremese Editore. ISBN 888440214X.
