= Un' Ora prima di Amleto, più Pinocchio =

- Release date: 1965
- Country: Italy
- Language: Italian

Un' Ora prima di Amleto, più Pinocchio is an Italian film which was released in 1965.
