= A Coffin for the Sheriff =

1965 film

Una bara per lo sceriffo
- Original theatrical release poster
- Directed by: Mario Caiano
- Written by: David Moreno; Guido Malatesta
- Produced by: Luigi Mondello; Roberto Santini; Eduardo Manzanos
- Starring: Anthony Steffen
- Cinematography: Julio Ortas Plaza (Eastmancolor, Panavision)
- Edited by: Antonio Gimeno (as Antonio Jimeno)
- Music by: Francesco De Masi
- Production companies: Nike Cinematografica; Estela Films
- Distributed by: Exclusivas Floralva Distribución S.A.
- Release date: 1965
- Running time: 95 minutes
- Country: Italy
- Language: Italian

A Coffin for the Sheriff (Italian: Una bara per lo sceriffo) is a 1965 Italian Spaghetti Western film directed by Mario Caiano and starring Anthony Steffen, Eduardo Fajardo, Fulvia Franco, George Rigaud and Armando Calvo.

== Plot ==
A mysterious gunslinger named Shenandoah arrives in the town of Richmond, which is in terror of the famous outlaw Lupe Rojo. Rojo and his gang stay there between robberies and bribe the town sheriff to look the other way. Shenandoah quickly falls in with the gang, but he has a hidden past: he is actually former US Marshal Joe Logan and he is seeking revenge, searching for the gang member who murdered his wife two years ago.

== Cast ==
- Anthony Steffen as Joe "Texas" Logan/Shenandoah
- Eduardo Fajardo as Russell Murder/Murdock/Banner
- Fulvia Franco as Lulu Belle
- George Rigaud as Wilson
- Armando Calvo as Lupe Rojo/Red Wolf
- Arturo Dominici as Jerry Krueger
- Luciana Gilli as Jane Wilson
- Karl Hirenbach as Peter
- Miguel Del Castillo as Sheriff Gallagher
- Jesús Tordesillas as Old Man
- Tomás Torres as Lupe/Wolf henchman
- Miguel de la Riva as Lupe/Wolf henchman
- Lucio de Santis as Lupe/Wolf henchman
- Frank Braña as Lupe/Wolf Henchman
- María Vico as Lupe's/Wolf's woman
- Santiago Rivero as banker
- Saturno Cerra as piano player
- Luis Barboo
- Bob Johnson
- Rafael Vaquero
- Francisco Alacid
- Antonio Orengo
- Rafael Hernández
- Rafael Ibáñez
- Gonzalo Brano

== In popular culture ==
Some parts of the soundtrack composed by Francesco De Masi are featured in the videogame Red Dead Revolver.

== DVD release ==
Wild East released this on a limited edition R0 NTSC DVD alongside Blood at Sundown in 2014.
