= Luciana Gilli =

Italian film actress

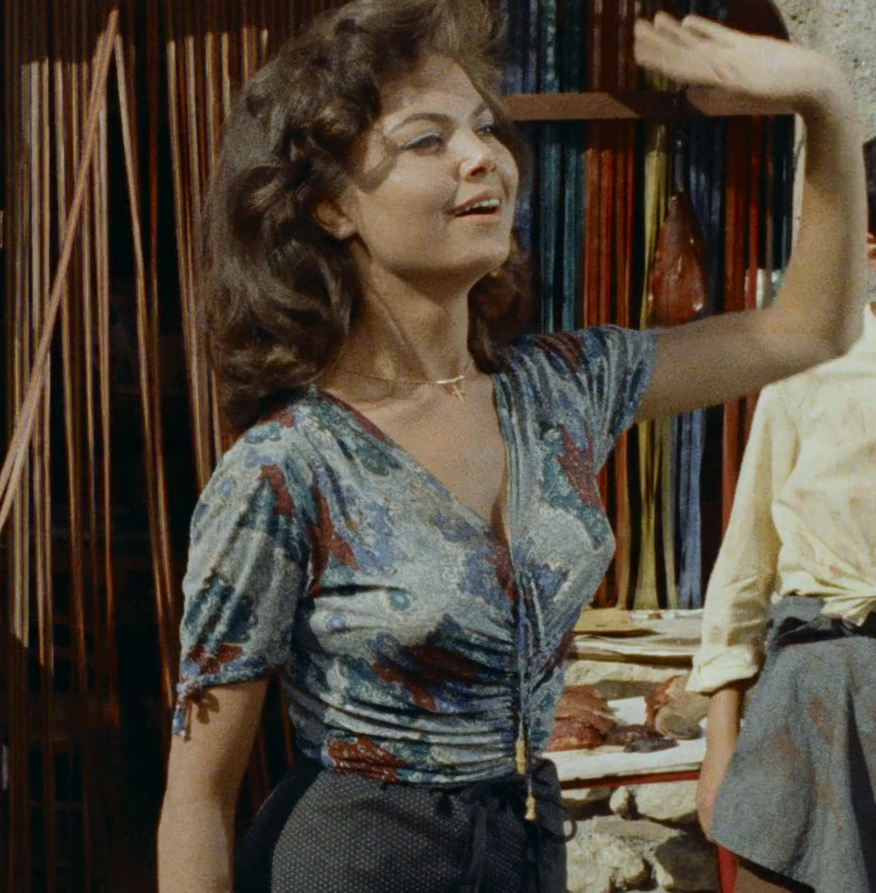
- Gilli in The Four Monks (1962)
- Born: 11 November 1944 (age 81); Rome, Lazio, Italy
- Occupation: Actress
- Years active: 1953-1971 (film)

Luciana Gilli (born 1944) is a former Italian film actress. During the 1960s she starred in a number of Italian films or European co-productions, particularly adventure stories and westerns.

Her film debut was the role of Luciana in the movie Wir Frauen in 1953. Ten years later she was seen in Jürgen Roland's German-Italian adventure film The Black Panther of Ratana with Marianne Koch and Heinz Drache. In the following years she acted in several spaghetti westerns, such as Eine Bahre für den Sheriff, Stirb aufrecht, Gringo!, Jonny Madoc rechnet ab and Der Tod zählt keine Dollar. She also appeared under the stage name Gloria Gilli, Luciana Gillj, and Judy Gilly.

== Selected filmography ==
- Adua e le compagne (1960)
- Leoni al sole (1961)
- Ghosts of Rome (1961)
- The Four Monks (1962)
- Seven Seas to Calais (1962)
- The Swindlers (1963)
- Ursus in the Land of Fire (1963)
- The Black Panther of Ratana (1963)
- The Thief of Damascus (1964)
- A Coffin for the Sheriff (1965)
- Conqueror of Atlantis (1965)
- Jungle Adventurer (1965)
- Mexican Slayride (1967)
- La morte non conta i dollari (1967)
- Pecos Cleans Up (1967)

== Bibliography ==
- Thomas Weisser. Spaghetti Westerns--the Good, the Bad and the Violent: A Comprehensive, Illustrated Filmography of 558 Eurowesterns and Their Personnel, 1961–1977. McFarland, 2005.
