= Vincenzo Musolino =

Italian actor, director, producer and screenwriter

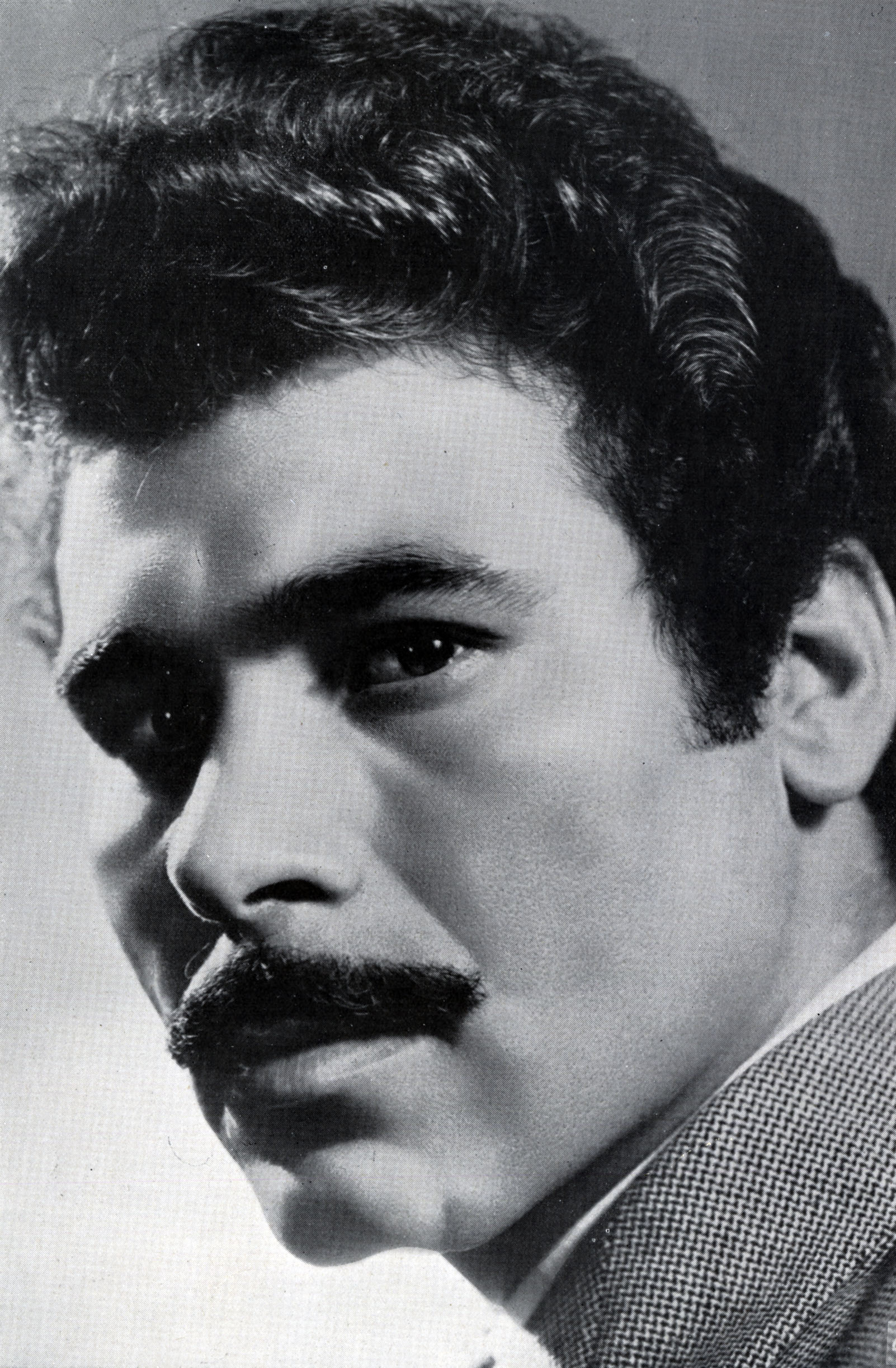
- Born: 9 May 1930; Reggio Calabria, Italy
- Died: 9 May 1969 (aged 39); Rome, Italy
- Occupation(s): Actor, Film director
- Years active: 1952-1968

Vincenzo Musolino (9 May 1930 – 9 May 1969) was an Italian actor, director, producer and screenwriter.

== Life and career ==
Musolino was born in Reggio Calabria into a humble family, and lived as a fisherman. During the military service he held in Venice, he was chosen by Renato Castellani for the leading role of Antonio in the neorealist drama Two Cents Worth of Hope. Following the success of the film, Musolino appeared in several films, mainly in supporting roles. In 1964, he dedicated himself to the production of genre films, often working with director Edoardo Mulargia, with whom he also wrote several screenplays. In 1968, one year before his premature death, he was the director to two low-budget Spaghetti Westerns, in which he was credited as Glenn Vincent Davis.

== Selected filmography ==
- The Triumph of Robin Hood (1962)
