= Marco Giusti =

Italian film critic (born 1953)

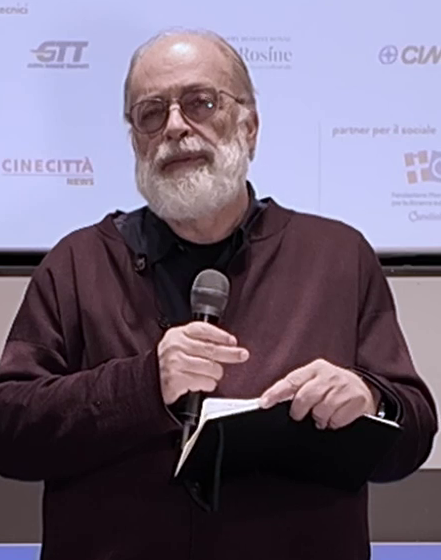
- Giusti at the 2025 Torino Film Festival
- Born: 24 December 1953 (age 72); Grosseto, Italy
- Occupation: Film critic

Marco Giusti (born 24 December 1953) is an Italian film critic, essayist, television writer and presenter.

== Life and career ==
The son of a quaestor, Giusti was born in Grosseto and during his early years frequently moved following his father's employment commitments, living in Ferrara, Trapani, Ragusa, Perugia, Trieste and Genoa. In 1974, he co-founded the film journal Il Falcome Maltese. He started working at RAI in 1978, and he created a number of television programs, notably Blob, Stracult and Cocktail d'amore, also co-hosting some of them. He is the longtime film critic of the newspaper Il manifesto and of the magazine L'Espresso, where he launched the first Italian column about criticism of commercials. Starting from 1983, he curated several retrospectives for the Venice Film Festival. He is author of numerous books, mostly focusing on Italian genre cinema.

=== Personal life ===
Giusti is married to film critic Alessandra Mammì, the daughter of the former Italian Republican Party politician and minister Oscar Mammì.
