= List of Italian films of 1962 =

The following is a sortable list of films produced in Italy in 1962.

Title	Italian-language title	Director	Cast	Genre	Notes
Arturo's Island	L'isola di Arturo	Damiano Damiani	Vanni De Maigret, Key Meersman, Reginald Kernan	drama	San Sebastian Film Festival winner
Arsène Lupin Versus Arsène Lupin	Arsenio Lupin contro Arsenio Lupin	Édouard Molinaro	Jean-Claude Brialy, Jean-Pierre Cassel, Françoise Dorléac	Comedy crime	Co-production with France
The Avenger	La leggenda di Enea	Giorgio Venturin	Steve Reeves, Giacomo Rossi Stuart, Carla Marlier	—N/a	Italian-French-Yugoslav co-production
Axel Munthe, The Doctor of San Michele	Donne senza paradiso - La storia di San Michele	Giorgio Capitani, Rudolf Jugert, Georg Marischka	O.W. Fischer, Rosanna Schiaffino, Sonja Ziemann	Drama	Co-production with France and West Germany
Caesar the Conqueror	Giulio Cesare, il conquistatore delle Gallie	Tanio Boccia	Cameron Mitchell, Rik Battaglia, Dominique Wilms, Ivica Pajer, Raffaella Carrà	Adventure, drama, historical	
Cléo from 5 to 7	Cléo de 5 à 7	Agnès Varda			
	Colpo gobbo all'italiana	Lucio Fulci	Mario Carotenuto, Andrea Checchi, Hélène Chanel	Comedy	
Conquered City	La città prigioniera	Joseph Anthony		war	
The Condemned of Altona	I sequestrati di Altona	Vittorio De Sica	Sophia Loren	drama	
The Constant Wife	Ma Costanza si porta bene?		Lilli Palmer, Peter van Eyck, Carlos Thompson		Co-production with West Germany
Copacabana Palace		Stefano Vanzina (as Steno)			
The Devil and the Ten Commandments	Le Diable et les Dix Commandements	Julien Duvivier		comedy-drama	
	I due della legione	Lucio Fulci	Franco Franchi, Ciccio Ingrassia, Rosalba Neri	Comedy	
The Easy Life	Il sorpasso	Dino Risi	Vittorio Gassman, Jean-Louis Trintignant, Catherine Spaak	comedy (commedia all'italiana)	Huge success
Eclipse	L'eclisse	Michelangelo Antonioni	Alain Delon, Monica Vitti, Francisco Rabal	drama	Award at the 1962 Cannes Film Festival
Eva	Eve	Joseph Losey		drama	
Family Diary	Cronaca familiare	Valerio Zurlini	Marcello Mastroianni, Jacques Perrin	drama	Golden Lion winner
The Festival Girls		Leigh Jason			
Fire Monsters Against the Son of Hercules	Maciste contro i mostri	Guido Malatesta	Reg Lewis, Margaret Lee, Luciano Marin	—N/a	Italian-Yugoslavian co-production
The Four Days of Naples	Le quattro giornate di Napoli	Nanni Loy	Lea Massari, Jean Sorel, Gian Maria Volonté	war	2 Academy Awards nominations. World War II
The Four Monks	I 4 monaci	Carlo Ludovico Bragaglia	Peppino De Filippo; Aldo Fabrizi; Erminio Macario; Nino Taranto	comedy (commedia all'italiana)	Success
The Gentleman from Epsom	Il re delle corse	Gilles Grangier	Jean Gabin, Madeleine Robinson, Frank Villard	Comedy	Co-production with France
Ghosts – Italian Style	Questi fantasmi	Renato Castellani		comedy	
Gladiator of Rome	Il gladiatore di Roma	Mario Costa			
Homesick for St. Pauli		Werner Jacobs			
The Horrible Dr. Hichcock	L'Orribile segreto del Dr. Hichcock	Riccardo Freda	Barbara Steele, Robert Flemyng	—N/a	
How to Succeed in Love	La moglie addosso	Michel Boisrond	Dany Saval, Jean Poiret, Jacqueline Maillan	Comedy	Co-production with France
Hypnosis	Ipnosi	Eugenio Martín	Jean Sorel, Eleonora Rossi Drago, Massimo Serato, Götz George, Heinz Drache	Thriller	
Jessica		Jean Negulesco, Oreste Palella			
Love at Twenty	L'amore a vent'anni	François Truffaut, Andrzej Wajda, Renzo Rossellini, Shintarō Ishihara, Marcel Ophüls			
Mafioso	Mafioso	Alberto Lattuada	Alberto Sordi	comedy (commedia all'italiana)	
Mamma Roma	Mamma Roma	Pier Paolo Pasolini	Anna Magnani, Ettore Garofolo, Franco Citti	drama	
Mandrin	L'indomabile	Jean-Paul Le Chanois	Georges Rivière, Silvia Monfort, Jeanne Valérie	adventure	
March on Rome	La marcia su Roma	Dino Risi	Vittorio Gassman, Ugo Tognazzi	comedy (commedia all'italiana)	describing the March on Rome of Benito Mussolini's black shirts from the point of view of two newly recruited, naïve black shirts
	Le massaggiatrici	Lucio Fulci	Sylva Koscina	Comedy	Italian-French co-production
Mondo Cane	Mondo cane	Gualtiero Jacopetti, Franco Prosperi		documentary	Academy Award for Best Song nominee.
A Queen for Caesar	Una regina per Cesare	Piero Pierotti, Victor Tourjansky			
Redhead	La rossa	Helmut Käutner		drama	
Roaring Years	Gli Anni ruggenti	Luigi Zampa	Nino Manfredi, Gino Cervi, Michèle Mercier	comedy (commedia all'italiana)	A satire about the Fascism years in a small town
The Sea	Il mare	Giuseppe Patroni Griffi	Umberto Orsini, Françoise Prévost, Dino Mele	drama	Gay interest
The Seven Deadly Sins	I sette peccati capitali	Philippe de Broca, Claude Chabrol, Jacques Demy, Sylvain Dhomme, Max Douy, Jean-Luc Godard, Eugène Ionesco, Edouard Molinaro, Roger Vadim			
Seven Seas to Calais	Il dominatore dei sette mari	Primo Zeglio, Rudolph Maté	Rod Taylor, Keith Michell	—N/a	
Sherlock Holmes and the Deadly Necklace	Sherlock Holmes la valle del terrore	Terence Fisher and Frank Winterstein			
Swordsman of Siena	La congiura dei dieci	Baccio Bandini		adventure	
Three Fables of Love	Le quattro verità	Alessandro Blasetti, Hervé Bromberger, René Clair, Luis García Berlanga	comedy		
The Trial	Le Procès	Orson Welles			
The Triumph of Robin Hood		Umberto Lenzi	Don Burnett, Gia Scala, Samson Burke	Adventure	
The Valiant	L'affondamento della valiant	Roy Ward Baker			
A Very Private Affair	Vita privata	Louis Malle			
A View from the Bridge	Vu du pont	Sidney Lumet	Raf Vallone, Maureen Stapleton	Drama	
War Gods of Babylon	Le sette folgori di Assur	Silvio Amadio			
	5 marines per 100 ragazze	Mario Mattoli	Virna Lisi, Mario Carotenuto, Hélène Chanel, Little Tony	comedy	
	Accroche-toi, y'a du vent!				
	Adieu Philippine	Jacques Rozier			
	Agostino				
	All'armi, siam fascisti				
	Angelina mia				
	L'amore difficile				
	Anima nera				
The Destruction of Herculaneum/A.D. 79	Anno 79: La distruzione di Ercolano	Gianfranco Parolini	Brad Harris	historical epic	
	Appuntamento in Riviera	Mario Mattoli		comedy	
My Son, the Hero	Arrivano i titani		Giuliano Gemma	sword and sandal	
	Axel Munthe - Der Arzt von San Michele				
	Benito Mussolini: anatomia di un dittatore	Mino Loy, Adriano Baracco		documentary	
	Boccaccio '70	Mario Monicelli, Federico Fellini, Luchino Visconti, Vittorio De Sica	Anita Ekberg, Romy Schneider, Sophia Loren	comedy (commedia all'italiana)	Film with four episodes. Monicelli's was removed outside Italy
	Brigata partigiana				
	Canzoni a tempo di twist				
	Canzoni di ieri, canzoni di oggi, canzoni di domani				
	Carillons sans joie				
	Cartouche	Philippe de Broca			
	Cent'anni fa				
	Chi è di scena				
	Colloquio con un uomo disprezzato				
	Congo vivo				
	Costantino il grande				
	Dal sabato al lunedi				
	Der Teppich des Grauens				
	Di domenica				
	Diciottenni al sole				
	Dieci italiani per un tedesco (Via Rasella)				
	Due contro tutti				
	Due samurai per cento geishe				
	En plein cirage				
	Europa; il mio paese				
	Gente di Trastevere				
	Gerardo e il monumento				
	Ginepro fatto uomo				
	Giulio Cesare contro i pirati				
	Gli eroi del doppio gioco				
	Gli italiani e le donne				
	Gli italiani e le vacanze				
	Guerra 1915–1918				
The Hot Port of Hong Kong	Heißer Hafen Hongkong				
	Horace 62				
	I briganti italiani				
	I Don Giovanni della Costa Azzurra				
	I due castelli				
	I due colonnelli				
	I fratelli Corsi				
	I giorni contati				
Charge of the Black Lancers	I lancieri neri				
	I moschettieri del mare				
	I motorizzati				
	I normanni				
	I nuovi angeli				
Planets Against Us	I pianeti contro di noi	Romano Ferrara	Michel Lemoine, Maria Pia Luzi, Jany Clair	science fiction	
	I sette gladiatori				
	I tre nemici				
	I tromboni di Fra Diavolo				
	Il cambio della guardia				
	Il capitano di ferro				
	Il carabiniere a cavallo				
	Il cielo piange				
	Il colpo segreto di d'Artagnan				
	Il commissario				
	Il conquistatore di Corinto				
	Il crollo di Roma				
	Il disordine				
	Il dominatore dei sette mari				
The Son of Captain Blood	Il figlio del capitano Blood		Sean Flynn	pirate adventure	
	Il figlio dello sceicco				
	Il giornalaccio				
	Il giustiziere dei mari				
	Il gladiatore invincibile		Richard Harrison	sword and sandal	
	Il medico delle donne				
	Il mio amico Benito				
	Il mondo sulle spiaggie				
	Il mondo è una prigione				
	Il paradiso dell'uomo				
	Il risorgimento oggi				
	Il sangue e la sfida				
	Il segno del vendicatore				
	Il tesoro del fiume				
	Il tiranno di Siracusa				
The Old Testament	Il vecchio testamento		Brad Harris	Biblical epic	
	Io Semiramide				
	Jack l'infaillible				
	L'assassino si chiama Pompeo				
	L'attico				
	L'avventura di terremoto				
	L'avvocato				
	L'ira di Achille				
	L'italiano ha 50 anni				
	L'oeil du malin				
	L'ombra di Zorro				
	L'éducation sentimentale				
	La banda Casaroli				
	La bella Lola				
	La bellezza di Ippolita	Giancarlo Zagni		comedy	Entered into the 12th Berlin International Film Festival
	La chambre ardente				
	La commare secca	Bernardo Bertolucci	Carlotta Barilli, Lorenza Benedetti, Alvaro D'Ercole	drama	Based on a story by Pier Paolo Pasolini. Bertolucci's first film
	La cuccagna				
	La Ferrara di Giorgio Bassani				
	La ferriera abbandonata				
	La fille du torrent				
	La freccia d'oro				
	La furia di Ercole				
	La grande stagione				
	La guerra continua				
	La legge della tromba				
	La leggenda di Fra Diavolo				
	La monaca di Monza	Carmine Gallone			
	La notte dell'innominato				
	La poupée	Jacques Baratier		science fiction	
Women of Devil's Island	Le prigioniere dell'isola del diavolo	Domenico Paolella	Guy Madison	Action	
	La ricotta	Pier Paolo Pasolini	Orson Welles, Laura Betti	short film on filmmaking	Seized in Italy. Accused of blasphemy. Part of the film RoGoPaG
	La salamandre d'or				
	La scelta				
	La serva padrona				
The Sword of El Cid| La spada del Cid			historical epic		
	La steppa	Alberto Lattuada		adventure	Entered into the 12th Berlin International Film Festival
	La Trieste di Svevo				
	La veglia				
	La vendetta				
	La vendetta della maschera di ferro				
	La vita provvisoria				
	La voglia matta				
	Lasciapassare per il morto				
	Le bateau d'Émile				
	Le chevalier de Pardaillan				
	Le couteau dans la plaie				
	Le Crime ne paie pas	Gérard Oury		drama	
	Le dolci notti				
	Le Doulos	Jean-Pierre Melville		crime	
	Le due leggi				
	Le finestre				
	Le Masque de fer	Henri Decoin			
	Le monte-Charge				
	Le notti bianche				
	Le pillole di Ercole	Luciano Salce		comedy	
	Le prigioniere dell'isola del diavolo				
	Le repos du guerrier				
	Le scorpion				
	Le sette fatiche di Alì Babà				
	Le sette spade del vendicatore				
	Le voci nel mondo				
	Les Mystères de Paris				
	Les parisiennes				
	Letto di sabbia				
	Lo sgarro				
	Lo smemorato di Collegno				
	Luciano, una vita bruciata				
	Maciste all'inferno				
	Maciste contro lo sceicco				
	Maciste, il gladiatore più forte del mondo				
Commando	Marcia o Crepa	Frank Wisbar	Stewart Granger	war	
	Marte, dio della guerra				
	Minaccia occulta				
	Mondo caldo di notte				
	Mondo sexy di notte				
	Nerone '71				
	Noche de verano				
	Notti calde d'Oriente				
	Odio mortale				
	Oggi a Berlino				
	Operazione Vega				
	Parigi o cara				
	Peccati d'estate				
	Pelle viva				
Pontius Pilate (1962 film)	Ponzio Pilato			Biblical epic	
	Quattro notti con Alba				
	Racconti dell'Italia di oggi - Una lapide in Via Mazzini				
	Rancore				
	Re Manfredi				
	Rencontres	Philippe Agostini			
	Rita				
	Rosmunda e Alboino				
	Salvatore Giuliano	Francesco Rosi	Salvo Randone, Frank Wolff	drama	Based on the life of Salvatore Giuliano. Won the Silver Bear for Best Director at Berlin
	Sangue a Parma				
	Scaramacai e la Befana				
	Senilità	Mauro Bolognini		drama	
	Sexy al neon				
	Sfida nella città dell'oro				
Slaughter of the Vampires	La strage dei vampiri	Roberto Mauri	Walter Bigari, Dieter Eppler, Graziella Granata	Horror	
	Solo contro Roma				
	Tarantula	Gianfranco Mingozzi		documentary	
	Tempo di credere				
	Tharus figlio di Attila				
	Tiro al piccione				
	Ton ombre est la mienne				
	Totò contro Maciste				
	Totò di notte n. 1				
	Totò diabolicus				
	Totò e Peppino divisi a Berlino				
	Twist, lolite e vitelloni				
	Ultimatum alla vita				
	Un alibi per morire				
	Un branco di vigliacchi				
	Un chien dans un jeu de quilles				
	Un errore giudiziaro				
	Un uomo da bruciare				
	Una domenica d'estate				
	Una storia milanese				
	Una vita violenta				
	Universo di notte				
	Uomini nell' infinito - Storia dell'astronautica				
	Ursus e la ragazza tartara				
	Ursus nella valle dei leoni			Peplum	
	Vacanze scambio				
	Via dei Piopponi				
	Vulcano, figlio di Giove			Peplum	
	Wa Islamah				
	Whisky a mezzogiorno				
	Zorro alla corte di Spagna				

== See also ==
- 1962 in film

== Notes ==
=== References ===
- Curti, Roberto (2015). Italian Gothic Horror Films, 1957-1969. McFarland. ISBN 978-1476619897.
- Curti, Roberto (2017). Riccardo Freda: The Life and Works of a Born Filmmaker. McFarland. ISBN 978-1476628387.
- Kinnard, Roy; Crnkovich, Tony (2017). Italian Sword and Sandal Films, 1908-1990. McFarland. ISBN 978-1476662916.
- Thrower, Stephen (2018) [May 1999]. Beyond Terror: The Films of Lucio Fulci (Revised & Expanded Second ed.). England, United Kingdom: Fab Press (published February 2018). ISBN 978-1-903254-90-5.
