= Two Undercover Angels =

- Spanish poster
- Directed by: Jesús Franco
- Screenplay by: Jesús Franco; Luis Revenga
- Based on: An idea by Karl-Heinz Mannchen
- Starring: Janine Reynaud; Rosanna Yanni; Adrian Hoven; Ana Casares; Chris Howland
- Production companies: Films Monta S.A.; Aquila Films Enterprises
- Release date: 7 April 1969 (Barcelona)
- Running time: 79 minutes
- Countries: Spain; West Germany

Two Undercover Angels (Spanish: El caso de las dos bellezas, lit. 'The Case of the Two Beauties') is a 1969 film directed by Jesús Franco.

The film is a Spanish and West German co-production, shot throughout Spain and Munich in 1967. It was the second of Franco's three-film deal with Aquila Films Enterprises, following Succubus (1968). It was also the second appearance of "The Red Lips", a duo of female secret agents who could continue to appear in various films made by Franco into the 1990s.

The film received generally positive reviews, with critics finding the film entertaining, though some were upset that Franco was pursuing predominantly commercial cinema instead of work of more artistic merit.

== Cast ==
- Janine Reynaud as Diana
- Rosanna Yanni as Regina
- Adrian Hoven as Mr. Radeck a.k.a. Klaus Tiller
- Ana Casares Radeck's assistant
- Chris Howland as Inspector Francis Malou of Interpol
- Michel Lemoine as Morpho

== Production ==
Two Undercover Angels was part of a three-picture deal director Jesús Franco had with the production company Aquila, run by Adrian Hoven, Michel Lemoine and Pier Caminneci. Two Undercover Angels was the second of these productions. It was a West German and Spanish co-production, developed by the Munich-based Aquila, and Films Monta S.A. based in Madrid. The film was shot between September and October 1967, just weeks after the Berlin premiere of Franco's first Aquila-funded film, Succubus (1968).

Among the cast was Janine Reynaud. She was the wife of Lemoine, and had previously worked with Franco in Succubus.

The film was shot between September and October 1967. Location shooting included several locations in Spain, including Alicante, La Manga del Mar Menor, Archena, Portmán, Madrid and Marbella as well as some in Munich in West Germany. Interiors were shot at Estudios Roma, S.A. in Madrid.

The American theatrical cut originally released as Sadisterotica is different from the original Spanish theatrical release. This includes changes in when the credits appear, some editing, and cuts the cage dancing in the night club sequence while the American version removes the North African establishing shots. The Spanish version of the film was scored by Fernando Garcia Morcillo. The film score of the American version of the film by Jerry van Rooyen was played during the montage when Franco accepted won his honorary Goya Award in 2010.

== Release ==
Two Undercover Angels was released in Barcelona on April 7, 1969. This was followed by screenings in Spain in Seville on May 3, 1969, and Madrid on August 18, 1969. In Spain, it had 517,738 admissions.

In 1999, Anchor Bay Entertainment released the film as Two Undercover Angels along with the two other Aquila productions on home video as part of their "Eurotrash" series. Vinegar Syndrome released the film on blu-ray in 2022 as Two Undercover Angels in a release that included Kiss Me Monster.

== Reception ==
From contemporary reviews, the Spanish newspaper La Vanguardia stated that Franco knew his craft thoroughly and though the film had limited artistic ambitions and that the production did not go beyond the level of mediocre, it was the most fun film they had seen recently and that Reynaud and Yanni more than did more than made up for it. ABC Andalucia found that Franco's film was entertaining, but lamented that Franco had abandoned any artistic efforts to focus completely on commercial films.

== Legacy ==
The film features a pair of female secret agents first introduced in Franco's film Labios rojos (1961) known as the Red Lips. Two Undercover Angels was their second film, with the characters appearing again in the third Aquila-made film, Kiss Me Monster (1967) and six more films that continued to be released into the 1990s.
