= UFOs in fiction =

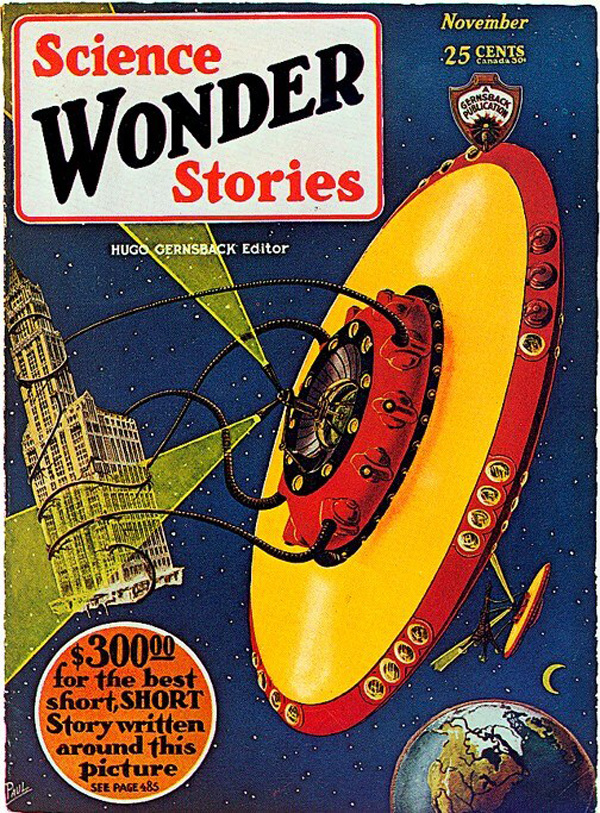
This 1929 cover of Science Wonder Stories, drawn by notable pulp artist Frank R. Paul, is one of the earliest depictions of a "flying saucer" in fiction

Many works of fiction have featured UFOs. In most cases, as the fictional story progresses, the Earth is being invaded by hostile alien forces from outer space, usually from Mars, as depicted in early science fiction, or the people are being destroyed by alien forces, as depicted in the film Independence Day. Some fictional UFO encounters may be based on real UFO reports, such as Night Skies. Night Skies is based on the 1997 Phoenix UFO Incident.

UFOs appear in many forms of fiction other than film, such as video games in the Destroy All Humans! or the X-COM series and Halo series and print, The War of the Worlds or Iriya no Sora, UFO no Natsu. Typically a small group of people or the military (which one depending on where the film was made), will fight off the invasion, however the monster Godzilla has fought against many UFOs.

== Books ==
- Oahspe: A New Bible - John Ballou Newbrough - First book to use the word Starship long before science-fiction writers conceived of interstellar space travel (1882).
- The War of the Worlds - H. G. Wells - Martian capsules are shot at Earth by aliens on Mars.(1898).

== Radio ==
- "The War of the Worlds" - 1938 - Radio adaptation of H. G. Wells' novel, notable for inciting panic among some viewers

== Films ==
=== 1930s ===
- Flash Gordon - 1936
- Buck Rogers - 1939 - a.k.a. Planet Outlaws

=== 1940s ===
- Flash Gordon Conquers the Universe - 1940 - a.k.a. Purple Death from Outer Space
- The Purple Monster Strikes - 1945 - a.k.a. D-Day on Mars
- Bruce Gentry - 1949 - possibly contains the first cinematic appearance of a Flying Saucer

=== 1950s ===
- Atom Man vs. Superman - 1950
- Flying Disc Man from Mars - 1950
- The Flying Saucer - 1950 - the first film to deal with Flying Saucers
- Captain Video: Master of the Stratosphere - 1951
- Mysterious Island - 1951
- The Man from Planet X - 1951
- The Day the Earth Stood Still - 1951
- The Thing from Another World - 1951
- 1. April 2000 - 1952
- Blackhawk - 1952
- Operation: Rabbit - 1952
- The Hasty Hare - 1952
- Radar Men from the Moon - 1952
- Zombies of the Stratosphere - 1952 - a.k.a. Satan's Satellites
- Commando Cody: Sky Marshal of the Universe - 1953
- The Lost Planet - 1953
- The War of the Worlds - 1953
- Invaders from Mars - 1953
- It Came from Outer Space - 1953
- Phantom from Space - 1953
- Robot Monster - 1953
- Devil Girl from Mars - 1954
- Gog - 1954
- Killers from Space - 1954
- Stranger from Venus - 1954 - a.k.a. Immediate Disaster
- The Beast with a Million Eyes - 1955
- This Island Earth - 1955
- Forbidden Planet - 1956
- Earth vs. the Flying Saucers - 1956
- Jungle Hell - 1956
- Warning from Space - 1956
- Unidentified Flying Objects: The True Story of Flying Saucers - 1956
- The Astounding She-Monster - 1957
- Invaders from Space - 1957 - a.k.a. Attack of the Flying Saucers
- The Mysterians - 1957
- The 27th Day - 1957
- Invasion of the Saucer Men - 1957
- Kronos - 1957
- Enemy From Space - 1957 - a.k.a. Quatermass 2
- Attack of the 50 Foot Woman - 1958
- The Blob - 1958
- Flying Saucer Daffy - 1958
- Hare-Way to the Stars - 1958
- I Married a Monster from Outer Space - 1958
- The Lost Missile - 1958
- The Strange World of Planet X - 1958
- War of the Satellites - 1958
- The Atomic Submarine - 1959
- The Cosmic Man - 1959
- Invisible Invaders - 1959
- Plan 9 from Outer Space - 1959
- Prince of Space - 1959
- Quatermass and the Pit - 1959
- Teenagers from Outer Space - 1959

=== 1960s ===
- Battle in Outer Space - 1960
- Visit to a Small Planet - 1960
- Battle of the Worlds - 1961
- Invasion of the Neptune Men - 1961
- Planets Against Us - 1962
- Invasion of the Star Creatures - 1962
- The Creeping Terror - 1964
- Il disco volante - 1964 - a.k.a. The Flying Saucer
- Hercules Against the Moon Men - 1964
- Robinson Crusoe on Mars - 1964
- Santa Claus Conquers the Martians - 1964
- Frankenstein Meets the Space Monster - 1965
- Invasion of Astro-Monster - 1965 - a.k.a. Monster Zero, a.k.a. Godzilla vs Monster Zero
- The Night Caller - 1965 - a.k.a. Night Caller from Outer Space, a.k.a. Blood Beast from Outer Space
- Destination Inner Space - 1966
- The Eye Creatures - 1966 - remake of Invasion of the Saucer Men (1957)
- Invasion - 1966
- Mars Needs Women - 1966
- Casino Royale - 1967
- Five Million Years to Earth - 1967 - remake of Quatermass and the Pit (1959)
- The Ambushers - 1967
- The Terrornauts - 1967
- They Came from Beyond Space - 1967
- Destroy All Planets - 1968
- Destroy All Monsters - 1968
- The Bamboo Saucer - 1968
- Goke, Body Snatcher from Hell - 1968
- The Incredible Invasion - 1969 - a.k.a. The Sinister Invasion

=== 1970s ===
- Night Slaves - 1970
- The People - 1971
- Silent Running - 1972
- The Disappearance of Flight 412 - 1974
- The Stranger Within - 1974
- UFO: Target Earth - 1974
- Escape to Witch Mountain - 1975
- The UFO Incident - 1975
- God Told Me To - 1976
- Laserblast - 1977
- Starship Invasions - 1977
- Close Encounters of the Third Kind - 1977
- The Alien Factor - 1978
- The Day Time Ended - 1978
- Eyes Behind the Stars - 1978
- Return from Witch Mountain - 1978
- The Cat from Outer Space - 1978
- The Dark - 1979
- Le gendarme et les extra-terrestres - 1979

=== 1980s ===
- Cheech & Chong's Next Movie - 1980
- Hangar 18 - 1980
- The Return - 1980 - a.k.a. The Alien's Return
- Earthbound - 1981
- Heavy Metal - 1981
- Big Meat Eater - 1982
- E.T. the Extra-Terrestrial - 1982
- The Thing - 1982
- Wavelength - 1982
- Xtro - 1983
- The Last Starfighter - 1984
- Meatballs Part II - 1984 - a.k.a. Space Kid
- Starman - 1984
- Strange Invaders - 1984
- Cocoon - 1985
- Morons from Outer Space - 1985
- My Science Project - 1985
- Star Knight - 1985
- UFOria - 1985
- The Aurora Encounter - 1986
- Flight of the Navigator - 1986
- Hyper Sapien: People from Another Star - 1986
- Invaders from Mars - 1986
- Maximum Overdrive - 1986
- *batteries not included - 1987
- Predator - 1987
- Real Men - 1987
- Alien Nation - 1988
- Cocoon: The Return - 1988
- It Came from Somewhere Else - 1988
- Killer Klowns from Outer Space - 1988
- Mac and Me - 1988
- My Stepmother Is an Alien - 1988
- They Live - 1988
- The Abyss -1989
- Communion - 1989

=== 1990s ===
- Predator 2 - 1990
- Invader - 1992
- Attack of the 50 Ft. Woman - 1993
- Fire in the Sky - 1993
- U.F.O. - 1993
- Official Denial - 1994
- The Puppet Masters - 1994
- Roswell - 1994
- Stargate - 1994
- The Arrival - 1996
- Independence Day - 1996
- Mars Attacks! - 1996
- Phenomenon - 1996
- Contact - 1997
- Invasion - 1997 - a.k.a. Robin Cook's Invasion
- Men in Black - 1997
- The Shadow Men - 1998
- Alien Abduction: Incident in Lake County - 1998
- Progeny - 1998
- The X-Files: Fight the Future - 1998
- Sphere - 1998
- The Second Arrival - 1998
- Godzilla 2000 - 1999
- Muppets from Space - 1999
- My Favourite Martian - 1999
- The Astronaut's Wife - 1999
- Roswell: The Aliens Attack - 1999
- Fantozzi 2000 - La clonazione - 1999

=== 2000s ===
- Scooby-Doo and the Alien Invaders - 2000
- Mission to Mars - 2000
- K-PAX - 2001
- Groom Lake - 2002
- Men in Black II - 2002
- Signs - 2002
- Alien Hunter - 2003
- Koi Mil Gaya (Bollywood) - 2003
- Visitors - 2003
- Godzilla: Final Wars - 2004
- The Forgotten - 2004
- Alien Abduction - 2005
- War of the Worlds - 2005
- Alien Autopsy - 2006
- Flying Saucer Rock'n'Roll - 2006
- Lifted - 2006
- Dreamland - 2007
- Martian Child - 2007
- Night Skies - 2007
- Indiana Jones and the Kingdom of the Crystal Skull - 2008
- The Day the Earth Stood Still - 2008 remake of the 1951 movie
- The Invasion - 2007
- Bolt - 2008
- Summer of the Flying Saucer - 2008
- The X-Files: I Want to Believe - 2008
- Alien Trespass - 2009
- District 9 - 2009
- Knowing - 2009
- Monsters vs. Aliens - 2009
- Race to Witch Mountain - 2009 remake of the 1975 movie
- The Fourth Kind - 2009
- Avatar - 2009

=== 2010s ===
- Skyline - 2010
- Apollo 18 - 2011
- Battle: Los Angeles - 2011
- Cowboys & Aliens - 2011
- Mars Needs Moms - 2011
- Paul - 2011
- Super 8 - 2011
- Transformers: Dark of the Moon - 2011
- UFO in Her Eyes - 2011
- Battleship - 2012
- Prometheus - 2012
- U.F.O. - 2012
- The Avengers - 2012
- Area 51 - 2015
- Independence Day: Resurgence - 2016

=== 2020s ===
- Nope - 2022
- No One Will Save You - 2023
- Disclosure Day - 2026

== Television ==
UFOs in television programs fall into three basic categories: in-universe real UFOs, hoaxes, and misidentified terrestrial spacecraft (often landing in a backward rural area or traveling back in time as in Lost in Space and Star Trek).

Some shows depicting in-universe real UFOs are: The Outer Limits, The Invaders, The Monkees, The Bionic Woman, Dark Skies, Roswell, Counterfeit Cat, Wonder Woman, V, and The X-Files.

Some hoax stories are: Batman, The Beverly Hillbillies, The Brady Bunch, The Green Hornet, The Man from U.N.C.L.E., The Girl from U.N.C.L.E., Mission: Impossible, and The Wild Wild West (a hoax story with an in-universe real sighting at the end).

Earth ships mistaken for UFOs appear in: I Dream of Jeannie, The Munsters, Lost in Space, Star Trek: The Original Series, Star Trek: Deep Space Nine, Star Trek: Voyager, and Gomer Pyle, U.S.M.C. (Pyle witnesses the location filming of a science-fiction film).

=== Alphabetical Order ===
- Ace Lightning - Episode: "Unidentified Flying Superhero"' (2002)
- Adventures of Superman - Episode: "Mr. Zero" (1957)
- ALF (1986–1990)
- Alvin & the Chipmunks - Episode: "Unidentified Flying Chipmunks" (1983)
- Batman - Episode: "The Joker's Flying Saucer" (1968)
- Benji, Zax & the Alien Prince - Episode: "U.F.O." (1983)
- Bewitched - Episode: "Samantha's Secret Saucer" (1968)
- Cars Toons: Mater's Tall Tales - Episode: "(U.F.M.) Unidentified Flying Mater" (2009)
- Charles in Charge - Episode: "U. F. Oh No!" (1987)
- Charlie's Angels - Episode: "Unidentified Flying Angels" (1977)
- Dark Skies (1996–1997)
- Dennis the Menace and Gnasher - Episode: "Unidentified Funny Object" (1996)
- Diagnosis: Murder - Episode: "Alienated" (1998)
- Doctor Who (1963–1989, 2005–present)
- Fargo - Episodes: "Waiting for Dutch" and "The Castle"
- Encounters (1996)
- Frasier - Episode: "Docu. Drama" (2001)
- Futurama - Episode: "Roswell That Ends Well" (2001)
- Garfield and Friends - Episode: "Unidentified Flying Orson" (1988)
- The early Godzilla movies portray Godzilla fighting and even destroying UFOs. These were often featured on late night TV, especially on shows like El Vira's show.
- The Golden Girls - Episode: "The One That Got Away"
- Gomer Pyle, U.S.M.C. - Episode: "Gomer and the Little Men from Outer Space" (1966)
- Green Acres - Episode: "The Saucer Season" (1967)
- Gumby - Episode: "Gumby's Close Encounter" (1988)
- Happy Days - Episodes: "My Favorite Orkan" (1978), "Mork Returns" (1979)
- Home Improvement - Episode: "Flying Sauces" (1991)
- I Dream of Jeannie - Episode: "U.F.Oh Jeannie" (1968)
- I Love Lucy - Episode: "Lucy Is Envious" (1954)
- Invasion (2005–2006)
- It's Punky Brewster - Episode: "Unidentified Flying Glomer" (1985)
- Jeopardy (2002)
- Johnny Bravo - Episodes: "Bikini Space Planet", "Alien Confidential"
- Lassie - Episodes: "The Man from Mars" (1959), "Timmy and the Martians" (1961)
- Lie to Me - Episode: "Beat the Devil" (2010)
- Littlest Pet Shop - Episode: "War of the Weirds" (2012)
- Lost in Space - Episode: "Visit to a Hostile Planet" (1967)
- MacGyver - Episode: "The Visitor" (1990)
- Married... with Children - Episode: "Married... with Aliens" (1990)
- Maude - Episode: "The Flying Saucer" (1977)
- Miami Vice - Episode: "Missing Hours" (1987)
- Mission: Impossible - Episode: "The Visitors"
- Monk - Episode: "Mr. Monk and the UFO" (2009)
- The Monkees- Episode: "Monkees Watch Their Feet" (1968)
- Mork & Mindy (1978–1982)
- Mister Ed - Episode: "Moko" (1964)
- The Munsters - Episode: "If a Martian Answers, Hang Up" (1965)
- My Favorite Martian (1963–1966)
- Mystery Science Theater 3000 - Episodes: "Hangar 18" (1989), "Attack of the Eye Creatures" (1992)
- Project UFO (1978–1979)
- Psi Factor: Chronicles of the Paranormal (1996–2000)
- Quantum Leap - Episode: "Star Light, Star Bright" (1992)
- Quatermass II (1957)
- Roswell (1999–2002)
- Rugrats - Episode: "Visitors from Outer Space" (1992)
- Scooby-Doo, Where Are You! - Episode: "Spooky Space Kook" (1969)
- seaQuest DSV (1993–1996)
- Seinfeld - Episode: "The Bizarro Jerry" (1996)
- Slimer! And the Real Ghostbusters - Episode: "Unidentified Sliming Object" (1989)
- Soap - Season 3 (1979-1980)
- South Park - Episode: "Cartman Gets an Anal Probe" (1997)
- Spadla z oblakov (1978)
- SpongeBob SquarePants - Episode: "Sandy's Rocket" (1999)
- Star Maidens (1976)
- Star Trek: Deep Space Nine - Episode: "Little Green Men" (1995)
- Star Trek: The Original Series - Episode: "Tomorrow Is Yesterday" (1967)
- Star Trek: Voyager - Episodes: "The 37's" (1995), "Future's End", Part I and Part II (1996)
- Taken (2002)
- Teenage Mutant Ninja Turtles - Episodes: "Invasion of the Turtle Snatchers" (1989), "Unidentified Flying Leonardo" (1990)
- The 4400 (2004–2007)
- The Addams Family - Episode: "The Addams Family and the Spaceman" (1965)
- The Adventures of Ozzie and Harriet - Episode: "Ozzie and the Space Age" (1959)
- The Avengers - Episode: "Man-Eater of Surrey Green" (1965)
- The Beverly Hillbillies - Episode: "The Flying Saucer" (1966)
- The Bionic Woman - Episode: "The Martians Are Coming, the Martians Are Coming" (1978)
- The Brady Bunch - Episode: "Out of This World" (1974)
- The Dick Van Dyke Show - Episode: "Uhny Uftz" (1965)
- The Dukes of Hazzard - Episode: "Strange Visitor to Hazzard" (1985)
- The Flintstones - Episode: "The Great Gazoo" (1965)
- The Golden Girls - Episode: "The One That Got Away" (1988)
- The Goodies - Episode: "U-Friend or UFO" (1980)
- The Honeymooners - Episode: "The Man from Space" (1955)
- The Invaders (1967–1968)
- The Lost Saucer (1975–1976)
- The Munsters - Episode: "If a Martian Answers, Hang Up" (1965)
- The Outer Limits (1963–1965)
- The Sarah Jane Adventures (2007–2011)
- The Simpsons - Episodes: "Treehouse of Horror" (1990), "The Springfield Files" (1997)
- The Six Million Dollar Man - Episode: "Straight on 'till Morning" (1974)
- The Strange World of Planet X (1956)
- Threshold (2005)
- Torchwood (2006–2011)
- The Twilight Zone - Episodes: "The Invaders" (1961), "To Serve Man" (1962), "Death Ship" (1963), "On Thursday We Leave for Home" (1963)
- UFO (1970–1971)
- V miniseries (1983)
- V: The Final Battle sequel miniseries (1984)
- V weekly series (1984–1985)
- V remake series (2009–2011)
- Walker, Texas Ranger - Episode: "Case Closed"
- War of the Worlds (1988–1990)
- Welcome Back, Kotter - Episode: "Class Encounters of the Carvelli Kind" (1978)
- The X-Files (1993–2002)

== Video games ==
- Space Invaders (1978)
- Asteroids (1979)
- Choplifter (1982)
- Moon Patrol (1982)
- X-COM (1994)
- Mother (1989)
- EarthBound (1994)
- Area 51 (1995)
- Independence Day (1996) Computer Game - Single person shooter
- Duke Nukem 3D (1996)
- Kirby (1998)
- SimCity 3000 (1999)
- Perfect Dark (2000)
- SimCity 4: Rush Hour (2003)
- Destroy All Humans! (2005)
- Microsoft Flight Simulator X (2006)
- SimCity DS (2007)
- Team Fortress 2 (2007) - Part of Invasion update in 2015
- SimCity Societies (2007)
- SimCity Creator (2008)
- SimCity (2013 video game) (2013)
- Halo: Combat Evolved (2001)
- The Sims 2 (2004)
- Deus Ex (2000)
- The Sims 3: Seasons (2012)
- Grand Theft Auto V (2013) - Hidden easter egg
- Fortnite Battle Royale, Chapter 2, Season 7: "Invasion!" (2021)
- Darwin's Paradox! (2026)

== See also ==
- 1947 flying disc craze
- Extraterrestrial life
- Flying saucers in popular culture
- Ufology
