= Kiss Me Monster =

1969 adventure mystery film

- Austrian film poster
- Directed by: Jesús Franco
- Written by: Jesús Franco
- Produced by: Adrian Hoven; José López Moreno
- Starring: Janine Reynaud; Rosanna Yanni; Chris Howland; Michel Lemoine; Ana Casares; Adrian Hoven; Barta Barri; Jesús Franco
- Cinematography: Jorge Herrero; Franz Hofer
- Edited by: Francisco García Velázquez; María Luisa Soriano
- Music by: Jerry van Rooyen
- Release date: 31 May 1969 (Austria)
- Running time: 87 minutes
- Countries: Spain; West Germany
- Language: German

Kiss Me Monster (Spanish: Bésame monstruo) is a 1969 adventure mystery film directed, written and co-starring Jesús Franco. Other principal cast include Janine Reynaud, Rosanna Yanni, Chris Howland, Michel Lemoine, Manuel Velasco, Ana Casares, Adrian Hoven and Barta Barri. It premiered in Austria on May 31, 1969, and was shown in the US in November 1972.

== Cast ==
- Janine Reynaud - Diana (as Janine Renaud)
- Rosanna Yanni - Regina (as Rossana Yanni)
- Chris Howland - Francis McClune
- Michel Lemoine - Jacques Maurier
- Manuel Velasco - Andy (as Manolo Velasco)
- Manolo Otero - Dimitri (as Manuel Otero)
- Ana Casares - Linda
- Adrian Hoven - Eric Vicas
- Marta Reves - Irina
- Barta Barri - Inspector Kramer
- María Antonia Redondo - Bulumba
- Jesús Franco - Abilene's Contact Man
- Dorit Dom - Anita (as Maria Dom)
