= Scorpions and Miniskirts =

- Spanish film poster
- Directed by: Ramón Comas
- Written by: Keith Luger; José Luis Madrid; Chris Chatterley; Ramón Comas
- Produced by: Pier A. Caminnecci; Adrian Hoven
- Starring: Adrian Hoven; Barth Warren
- Cinematography: Eloy Mella
- Music by: Piero Umiliani; Jerry van Rooyen (German version)
- Release date: 1967
- Running time: 99 minutes
- Countries: Italy, Spain, West Germany

Scorpions and Miniskirts or Chinos y minifaldas or Death on a Rainy Day is a 1967 Italian/Spanish/West German international co-production Eurospy comedy action martial arts film shot in New York, Hong Kong, Paris and in studios in Rome and Madrid. Directed by Ramón Comas, the film stars Adrian Hoven who co-produced the film with his partner Pier Andrea Caminneci in the second film of their Aquila Film Enterprises. The film also stars Barth Warren in his film debut and George Wang; a Chinese actor playing an Oriental mastermind. The film was written by Keith Luger, the pen name of prolific Spanish pulp fiction Michael Oliveros Tovar (1924–1985); the film being his first screenplay.

== Plot ==
A Kommissar X type pair of French secret agents from the Strategic Investigation Bureau investigate the death of an agent in Hong Kong who sent a bottle of perfume to Paris. The pair uncover a plot by Dr. Kung, a Fu Manchu type Chinese mastermind and his secret society of the Red Scorpion. Dr Kung seeks to start World War III by injecting the brain of the United States Secretary of Defense with RNA that will cause him to do Dr. Kung's bidding.

== Cast ==
- Adrian Hoven ... Paul Riviere
- Barth Warren ... Bruno Nussak
- Gérard Landry ... Commander Fernion
- Teresa del Río ... Sonia Bellford
- Claudia Gravy ... Shantung
- Lilia Neyung ... Leila Wong
- Karin Feddersen ... Françoise Moreau
- George Wang ... Dr. Kung
- Josyane Gibert ... Pamela
- Wolfgang Preiss ... Dr. Angus Cromwell
