= Byleth =

Byleth may refer to:

- Beleth, or Byleth, a goetic demon
- Byleth (Fire Emblem), a character in the Fire Emblem franchise
- Byleth: The Demon of Incest, a 1972 Italian gothic horror film
