= I diavoli di Spartivento =

- Directed by: Leopoldo Savona
- Written by: Mario Amendola; Leopoldo Savona; Gino Mangini; Roberto Gianviti
- Starring: John Drew Barrymore
- Cinematography: Pier Ludovico Pavoni
- Music by: Francesco De Masi
- Release date: 1963
- Country: Italy
- Language: Italian

I diavoli di Spartivento (also known as Weapons of Vengeance, Weapons of War, The Devils of Spartivento, Arms of the Avenger, Curse of the Haunted Forest and The Fighting Legions) is a 1963 Italian adventure film directed by Leopoldo Savona and starring John Drew Barrymore and Scilla Gabel.

== Cast ==
- John Drew Barrymore as Lotario Duchesca
- Scilla Gabel as Isabella
- Giacomo Rossi Stuart as Vannozzo Duchesca
- Romano Ghini as Demetrio Duchesca
- Jany Clair as Fiammetta
- Mario Pisu as Eusebio Pimperval
- Michel Lemoine as Viscount Lagover
- Ugo Sasso as Braccio Da Prato
- Amedeo Trilli as Basilio
- Ugo Silvestri as Duke of Collinalto
- Franco Balducci as Capitain of the Duke
- Gian Pietro Calasso as Mute Servant of Eusebio
- Ignazio Leone as Servant of Isabella
- Antonella Murgia as Silvia
