= Succubus (1968 film) =

1968 film

- West German theatrical release poster
- Directed by: Jesús Franco
- Screenplay by: Pier A. Caminnecci
- Produced by: Adrian Hoven
- Starring: Janine Reynaud; Jack Taylor; Howard Vernon; Michel Lemoine; Nathalie Nort; Pier A. Caminnecci; Adrian Hoven
- Cinematography: Jorge Herrero; Franz X. Lederle
- Edited by: Frizzi Schmidt
- Music by: Friedrich Gulda; Jerry Van Rooyen
- Production company: Aquila Film Enterprises
- Distributed by: Constantin Film
- Release date: April 19, 1968 (West Germany)
- Running time: 82 minutes
- Country: West Germany
- Language: German

Succubus (German: Necronomicon – Geträumte Sünden, lit. 'Necronomicon – Sinful Dreams') is a 1968 West German erotic horror film directed by Jesús Franco and starring Janine Reynaud, Jack Taylor, Adrian Hoven, and Michel Lemoine. It follows Lorna Green, a performer at a Lisbon nightclub who performs fictionalized acts that involve erotically charged sadomasochistic murders. As she begins to suffer violent, surreal nightmares, it is suggested that Lorna may be under mind control by a man who may be Satan incarnate.

Succubus was Franco's first film made entirely outside of Spain. During production, the German backers for the film fell out, leading to the producer contacting Pier A. Caminnecci to finance the film. The film was released in West Germany in April 1968, and was subsequently acquired by American International Pictures, who distributed it in the United States beginning in April 1969.

== Plot ==
In Lisbon, Lorna Green works as a nightclub dancer who performs sadomasochistic acts that end with simulated murders, which shock and titillate the club patrons. She is overseen by her manager, William Francis Mulligan, an American who "discovered" Lorna and helped her forge her nightclub act. After performing at the club one night, Lorna returns home and is visited by William, who spends the night.

Lorna has a bizarre dream in which she is a countess who is running late to a dinner party being held for her at her castle. She travels there by trolley, and is met by Pierce, a mysterious man who feels he has manifested Lorna as a "disciple of evil" and a devil on earth to do his bidding. Lorna meets with a man named Admiral Kapp, and the two engage in a word association game with one another, repeating names of famous writers and artists, before Lorna stabs him through the eye socket.

The following day, Lorna and William stroll through the city together and stumble upon a funeral wake where numerous women mourn in the street. A curious Lorna approaches the body in the chapel and removes a shawl covering the dead man's face. She is horrified to see the man—who has been stabbed through the eye—resembles the Admiral Kapp from her nightmare. Later, she accompanies William to a party held by psychiatrist Ralf, where the partygoers indulge in LSD. Lorna goes into a trancelike state where she begins writhing on the floor in front of the guests, who, under the influence of the drug, approach her like animals, crawling along the floor.

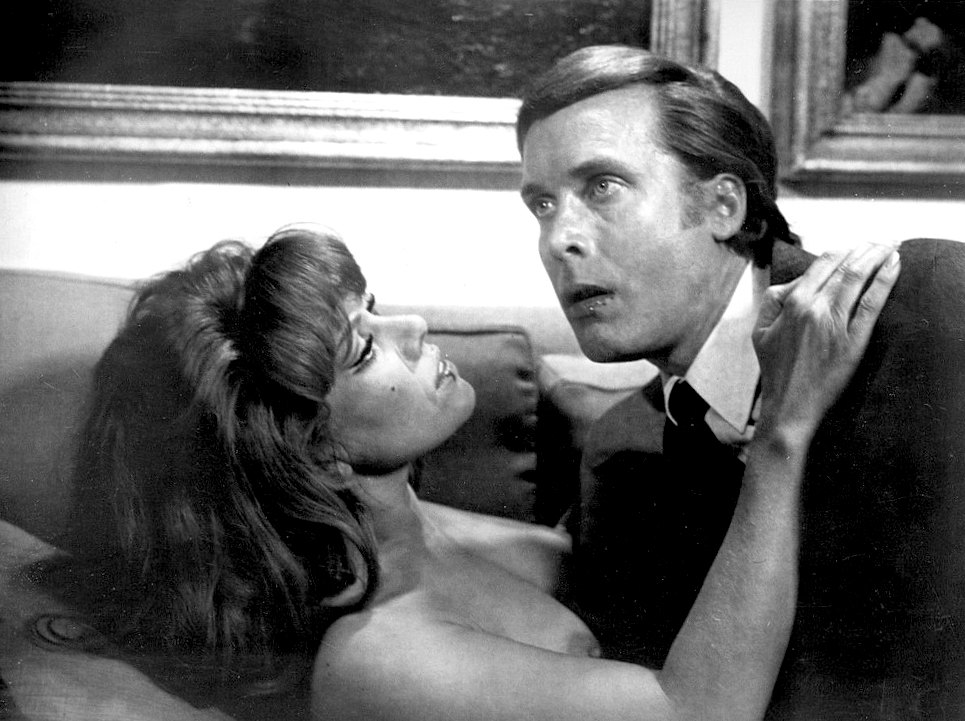
Lorna and William in Succubus

William recounts a story to Lorna about a countess who, under the influence of Satan, murdered her husband after he built her a palace. Later, at the club, Pierce watches Lorna from a distance before approaching her at her table, addressing her as the Countess. She rebuffs him, and tells William and his friends that she does not know the man. In another dream, Lorna brings her friend, Bella, to visit a dilapidated seaside castle where she resides. She takes Bella to a room full of mannequins in various period dresses, and seduces her before bludgeoning her with a statue. Bella attempts to flee before several of the mannequins come to life, after which Lorna stabs her to death. Lorna awakens from the nightmare to find her apartment largely empty, as she has made plans to relocate to Berlin with William.

Lorna accompanies William to Berlin. Unbeknownst to her, William meets with Pierce, with whom he has been in cahoots; the two have conspired to manipulate Lorna. Lorna, in a trance-like state, enacts the sadomasochistic club act in she and William's rented apartment. Held captive for the act are a man and woman with whom Lorna has performed in her club act. William looks on as Lorna stabs the man to death before killing the woman, who pleads for her life. William calls Lorna's name, breaking her trance, and she flees upstairs where gunfire erupts, and she screams.

William returns to Lisbon and enters his apartment there, where he finds a nude Lorna lounging on his couch. She asks him to kiss her, which he obliges, before she plunges a knife through his neck. Pierce appears and drives Lorna to the harbor, where he promises her that his power will "bring her peace," and deems her his "Faustina." The two enter the castle together.

== Cast ==
- Janine Reynaud as Lorna Green
- Jack Taylor as William Francis Mulligan
- Adrian Hoven as Ralf Drawes
- Howard Vernon as Admiral Kapp
- Nathalie Nort as Olga
- Michel Lemoine as Pierce
- Pier A. Caminnecci as Hermann
- Américo Coimbra as Crucified Actor
- Lina De Wolf as Bella

== Production ==
After working on several productions in Spain, director Jesús Franco sought out financial backing in Germany. Franco became frustrated with the production rules and censorship in Spain, stating that even if he had an entirely Spanish crew, he would have to film in Spain to receive the co-production funding, and that for Succubus, "the censors had taken their red pen and crossed everything out, even the title". The title for the film was found at the home of Pier A. Caminnecci, where Franco found a book titled Necronomicon. The story was only three pages long, so Franco fused the story with a previous film script that he had worked on.

After finishing work on his film Lucky, the Inscrutable, he went to production manager Karl-Heinz Mannchen with an eight-page script for Succubus. After securing funding, model Janine Reynaud was cast in the film after being introduced to Franco by her husband, actor Michel Lemoine.

The film was shot in Lisbon and West Berlin. While filming was in progress, the German financial backers pulled out of the film. Producer Adrian Hoven contacted Pier A. Caminnecci, who took an interest in actress Reynaud and agreed to finance the film. An affair later occurred between the two.

The film features a jazz score by Friedrich Gulda. Franco claimed in interviews that he wrote the screenplay for this film, and edited it with Adrian Hoven.

== Release ==
Necronomicon was the first opportunity I had to make a film the way I wanted to make it. I'm rather astonished that the film did as well as it did.

— Director Jesús Franco on working outside of Spain for Succubus

Succubus was shown at trade shows at the 17th Berlin International Film Festival in 1967. Variety noted that after the film's showing it received substantial word-of-mouth for its sex and horror sequences.

It was released in West Germany on April 19, 1968 and was a financial success.

The film was acquired by American International Pictures and released in the United States under the title Succubus, opening in New York City on April 25, 1969. To promote the film, a phone number was offered for audience members who did not know what the title succubus meant. The film was shown at Fantastic Fest in 2009 with Franco in attendance. The print of the film shown was borrowed from American director Quentin Tarantino.

=== Critical response ===
Vincent Canby wrote a review in The New York Times, noting that the film could not decide if it wanted "to be a bare-breasted exploitation movie or a nice, erotic horror story about a demented lady of bizarre sexual tastes" referring to the film as "being a bit of a drag". In a review for the Umberto Lenzi film Orgasmo, Roger Ebert critiqued Succubus as one of the worst films of the year, referring to it as "a flat-out bomb. It left you stunned and reeling. There was literally nothing of worth in it. Even the girl was ugly." David McGillivray (Monthly Film Bulletin) claimed that "the most positive thing one can say about Succubus is that it is strikingly different from anything Jesús Franco has directed either before or since." The review complimented that the "utilisation of an obviously low budget is relatively accomplished. In all other respects, however, the film is an absurdly hit-or-miss affair with scenes that have a certain bizarre appeal (shop window dummies coming to life) juxtaposed with others of crushing banality."

"Hans." of Variety described the film as one that "may stir controversy" as "many will see Necronomicon as just a sex and horror film, other might see more" and that "there will be a split opinion about pic's artistic outcome, but its technical side can't be disputed" noting "excellent color photography, it has several fascinating optical effects." Kevin Thomas of the Los Angeles Times panned the film as "another sleazy piece of European-made sexploitation, arty to the point of incoherence."

=== Home media ===
The film was originally released on DVD on October 27, 1998 by Anchor Bay Entertainment. It was released again on July 25, 2006 with an interview with director Jesús Franco and actor Jack Taylor as bonus features by Blue Underground.

== Sources ==
- Shipka, Danny (2011). Perverse Titillation: The Exploitation Cinema of Italy, Spain and France, 1960–1980. Jefferson, NC: McFarland. ISBN 978-0-7864-4888-3.
- Thrower, Stephen (2015). Murderous Passions: The Delirious Cinema of Jesús Franco. Strange Attractor Press. ISBN 978-1-907222-31-3.
