= What Am I Doing in the Middle of a Revolution? =

1972 film directed by Sergio Corbucci

What Am I Doing in the Middle of a Revolution? (Che c'entriamo noi con la rivoluzione?)
- Italian film poster
- Directed by: Sergio Corbucci
- Screenplay by: Massimo Franciosa; Sabatino Ciuffini; Sergio Corbucci
- Story by: Sergio Corbucci
- Produced by: Mario Cecchi Gori
- Starring: Vittorio Gassman; Paolo Villaggio
- Cinematography: Alejandro Ullola
- Edited by: Eugenio Alabiso
- Music by: Ennio Morricone
- Production companies: Fair Film; Midega Films
- Distributed by: Dear Film
- Release date: 19 December 1972
- Running time: 103 minutes
- Countries: Italy; Spain
- Language: Italian

What Am I Doing in the Middle of a Revolution? (Italian: Che c'entriamo noi con la rivoluzione?, also known as ¡Qué nos importa la revolución!) is a 1972 Zapata Western comedy film.

The title should be interpreted, according to the director Sergio Corbucci, as "What Am I Doing in the Middle of the Western Cinema?". It is the final chapter of the Corbucci's trilogy about the Mexican revolution, after The Mercenary and Compañeros. The film mixes comedy and political apologue.

== Plot ==
Padre Don Albino Moncalieri and his nemesis Guido Guidi are, by a series of accidents involved in the Mexican revolution. The theatre company of Guido Guidi is hired by a certain Peppino Garibaldi, who seems to be a relative of famous Giuseppe Garibaldi. On tour throughout Mexico they get by accident entangled in revolutionary activities and experience the fog of war.

== Cast ==
- Vittorio Gassman as Guido Guidi
- Paolo Villaggio as Don Albino Moncalieri
- Riccardo Garrone as Peppino Garibaldi
- Eduardo Fajardo as Herrero
- Rosanna Yanni as Rosanna
- Leo Anchóriz as Carrasco

== Reception ==
A quite negative retrospective review states: "Sergio Corbucci directed some of the best serious Spaghetti Westerns ever made and some of the best focused on the Mexican revolution (Compañeros and The Mercenary).But when he tried his hand at Spaghetti comedy, the result was often an overlong bore. That was the case with Sonny and Jed and that’s the case here.Gassman overacts badly as the star of the show. Villaggio is a bit more loveable, but not loveable enough to build a film around."
