= Colpo gobbo all'italiana =

- Film poster
- Directed by: Lucio Fulci
- Screenplay by: Bruno Corbucci; Giovanni Grimaldi
- Story by: Mario Carotenuto
- Cinematography: Alfio Contini
- Edited by: Franco Fraticelli
- Music by: Piero Umiliani
- Production companies: Mirafilm; Marcus Produzione Cinematografica
- Release dates: March 28, 1962 (Turin & Bari)
- Running time: 100 minutes
- Country: Italy
- Box office: ITL 116.630 million

Colpo gobbo all'italiana (lit. 'Smart Move Italian-Style') is a 1962 Italian comedy film directed by Lucio Fulci.

== Cast ==
- Mario Carotenuto as Nando Paciocchi
- Marisa Merlini as Nunziata, Maggiola's wife
- Andrea Checchi as Orazio Menicotti
- Gina Rovere as Gina, Paciocchi's wife
- Gino Bramieri as Panza
- Aroldo Tieri as Tifillo, the burglar
- Gabriele Antonini as Ennio
- Hélène Chanel as the French blonde
- Ombretta Colli as Silvana, Ennio's girlfriend
- Jole Fierro as Ines, a sex worker
- Nino Terzo as Maggiola

== Production ==
Colpo gobbo all'italiana was a production of two Italian film production companies: Mirafilm and Marcus Produzione Cinematografica. It was directed by Lucio Fulci. While Fulci biographer Stephen Thrower's book Beyond Terror: The Films of Lucio Fulci (2018) only credits Bruno Corbucci and Giovanni Grimaldi for the screenplay, ANICA includes Beppe Costa. The film was previously known as La nottola in bicicletta (lit. 'The Night Owl on a Bicycle' before its release. The film's opening features a song titled "La Nottola di notte" (lit. 'The Owl of the Night') written and performed by Gianni Meccia.

The title Colpo gobbo all'italiana combines the names of two other works: Colpo gobbo is an Italian title for the Mickey Spillane's novel The Big Kill (1951) while "all'italiana" borrows from the popular film Divorce Italian Style (1961).

Mario Carotenuto was a prolific actor in comedy films of the period in Italy, who previously had appeared in Fulci's earlier films Ragazzi del Juke-Box (1959) and Urlatori alla sbarra (1960). Carotenuto, who had written the story and also served as producer, clashed with Fulci over changes to the script; after filming wrapped, Fulci ended his friendship with him, and the two never worked together again.

Thrower said that the film could be describe as Fulci's contribution to the "oft-reviled" pink neorealism genre of Italian cinema.

== Release and reception ==
Colpo gobbo all'italiana was distributed in Italy by Mirafilm released to theatres in Turin and Bari May 11, followed by a release in Rome on June 9, 1962. It grossed a total of 116.630 million Italian lire in Italy. The film stayed in theaters through mid-1962 and was still playing in Rome through September. While Dizionario del cinema italiano said the box office in Italy was lower than earlier films like I ladri (1959), a film Fulci described as a financial flop.

It had a 100-minute runtime on its theatrical release in Italy and a 90-minute runtime in Spain when it played in Barcelona and Seville as La rubia tuvo la culpa in 1965.

== See also ==
- List of Italian films of 1962
