= Janine Reynaud =

French film actress (1930–2018)

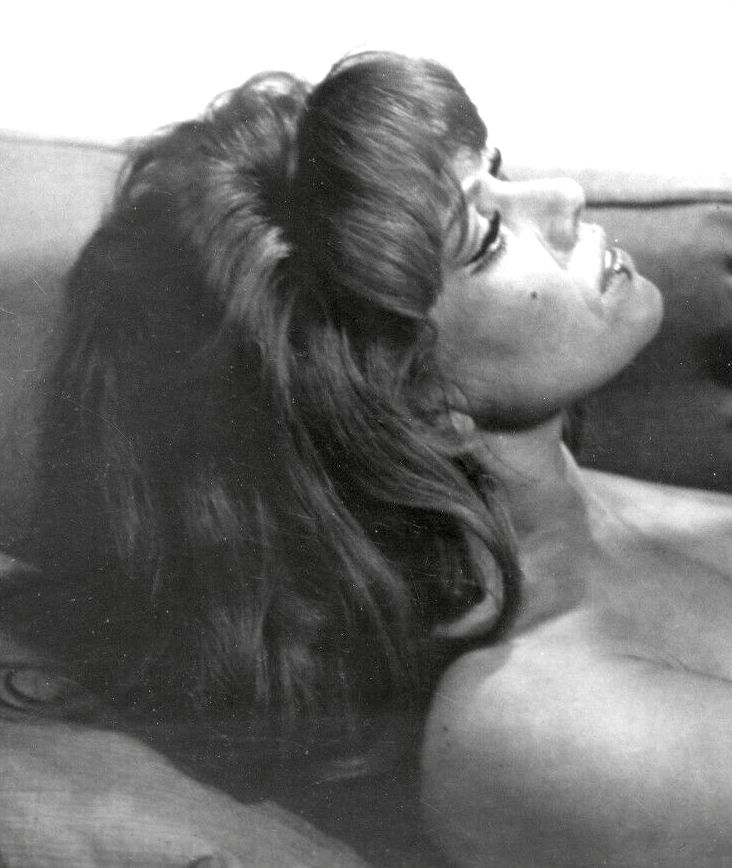
- Reynaud in Succubus (1968)
- Born: 13 August 1930; Paris, France
- Died: May 13, 2018 (aged 87); Sugar Land, Texas, U.S.
- Occupation: Actress
- Years active: 1965-1978 (film)

Janine Reynaud (13 August 1930 – 13 May 2018) was a French film actress best known for her appearances in several films by director Jesús Franco, in particularly the 1968 film Succubus.

== Biography ==
Reynaud was born in Paris, France in 1930.

Her filmography consists mostly of genre and exploitation pictures, including softcore films. She appeared in the films Six Days a Week and Mission to Caracas (both 1965) before starring in several films directed by Jesús Franco, including Kiss Me Monster (1967) and Succubus (1968).

Reynaud was married to her Succubus co-star Michel Lemoine for a time, though they eventually separated. Reynaud retired to the United States, settling in Texas. She died on 13 May 2018 in Sugar Land, a suburb of Houston.

== Filmography ==
Year	Title	Role	Notes
1965	Six Days a Week	Silvana Mazzetti	
1965	Una voglia da morire		
1965	Da Istanbul ordine di uccidere	Janine	
1965	Mission to Caracas	Véronique	
1966	Bob Fleming... Mission Casablanca	Halima	
1966	Ypotron - Final Countdown	Carol	
1966	Special Code: Assignment Lost Formula	Sheena	
1966	Operation White Shark	Frida Braun / Tattoo Club Singer	
1966	La spia che viene dal mare	Madame Lina	
1967	The Seventh Floor	The English Ambassador's Daughter	
1968	Succubus	Lorna Green	
1968	Killer Without a Face	Francis	
1968	Im Schloß der blutigen Begierde	Vera Lagrange	
1968	The Black Hand	Mafalda	
1968	Run, Psycho, Run	Althea	
1969	Two Undercover Angels	Diana	
1969	Kiss Me Monster	Diana	
1970	Wie kurz ist die Zeit zu lieben	Fabienne	
1971	Human Cobras	Clara	
1971	I Am a Nymphomanic / Young Casanova / The Sensuous Teenager (Je suis une nymphomane)	Murielle	
1971	The Case of the Scorpion's Tail	Lara Florakis	
1971	Captain Typhoon	Woman in Cabin of Yacht	Uncredited
1971	Frustration	Adélaïde	
1971	Blindman	Prostitute	
1972	Les félines	Maude	
1972	Les désaxées	Francis	
1973	Pénélope, folle de son corps	Pénélope	
1973	Les chiennes	Viriane	
1973	Les confidences érotiques d'un lit trop accueillant	La maîtresse de Maurice	
1974	Les petites saintes y touchent	Jehanne d'Arc (narrator)	
1978	Tire pas sur mon collant	Mme de Tourville	(final film role)

== Bibliography ==
- Craig, Rob (2019). American International Pictures: A Comprehensive Filmography. Jefferson, North Carolina: McFarland. ISBN 978-1-476-66631-0.
