= I Learned That in Paris =

- Directed by: Thomas Engel
- Written by: Thomas Engel; Fred Ignor
- Produced by: Willy Zeyn
- Starring: Chris Howland; Christa Williams; Gisela Trowe
- Cinematography: Heinz Hölscher
- Edited by: Gertrud Hinz-Nischwitz
- Music by: Hans-Horst Henning
- Production company: Zeyn-Film
- Distributed by: Union Film
- Release date: 16 April 1960
- Running time: 89 minutes
- Country: West Germany
- Language: German

I Learned That in Paris (German: Das hab ich in Paris gelernt) is a 1960 West German musical comedy film directed by Thomas Engel and starring Chris Howland, Christa Williams and Gisela Trowe.

== Cast ==
- Chris Howland as Fred Miller
- Christa Williams as Dr. Brigitte Freyer
- Gisela Trowe as Clarissa Wedell
- Dieter Borsche as Bernhard Wedell, ihr Mann
- Harald Juhnke as Mathias Mai, Lawyer
- Carl-Heinz Schroth as Faktotum Neumann
- Werner Fuetterer as Hubert Wüstenhagen
- Hans Nielsen as Professor Giselius
- Erwin Linder as Dr. Knapp
- Lotte Rausch as Hilde
- Maria Sebaldt as Lydia
- Birgit Bergen as Betty
- Edith Hancke
- Kurt Klopsch
- Karl Kramer
- Karl-Heinz Kreienbaum
- Maria Litto
- Hein Timm

== Bibliography ==
- Bock, Hans-Michael & Bergfelder, Tim. The Concise CineGraph. Encyclopedia of German Cinema. Berghahn Books, 2009.
