= Apocalypse Joe =

1970 film

- Directed by: Leopoldo Savona
- Written by: Leopoldo Savona
- Starring: Anthony Steffen; Eduardo Fajardo
- Cinematography: Franco Villa; Julio Ortas
- Edited by: Amedeo Giomini
- Music by: Bruno Nicolai
- Release date: 1970

Apocalypse Joe (Italian: Un uomo chiamato Apocalisse Joe, Spanish: Apocalipsis Joe), also known as A Man Called Apocalypse Joe and A Man Called Joe Clifford, is a 1970 spaghetti Western film written and directed by Leopoldo Savona under the pseudonym George Finley.

== Cast ==
- Anthony Steffen as Joe Clifford
- Eduardo Fajardo as Berg
- Mary Paz Pondal as Rita
- Fernando Cerulli as Dr. Clan
- Stelio Candelli as Braddox
- Fernando Bilbao as Bodo
- Veronica Korosec as Mildred
- Giulio Baraghini as Sheriff Floyd
- Flora Carosello as Aunt Dulcy
- Renato Lupi as Friar Antonio
- Silvano Spadaccino as Al

== Production ==
The film is an -Italian-Spanish co-production by Transeuropa Film, Italian International Film, and Copercines. It was mainly shot in Hoyo de Manzanares.

== Reception ==
A contemporary Corriere della Sera review praised the film, noting that "in the bleak landscape of Italian–Spanish co-productions [...] it warrants a place of distinction for its decent pacing and, especially in the second part, a handful of clever ideas." Thomas Weisser described the film as "a good, action-oriented Spaghetti Western" with "a solid musical score". According to Paolo Mereghetti, the film will entertain Spaghetti Western aficionados, but "does not exploit the potential of its script and falls back on a succession of killings, in a crescendo that borders on parody."
