= Chris Howland =

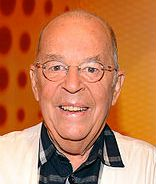
- Howland in 2009
- Born: John Christopher Howland; 30 July 1928; London, England
- Died: 29 November 2013 (aged 85); Rösrath, North Rhine-Westphalia, Germany
- Occupations: Radio and TV presenter, actor, singer, author
- Musical career
- Genres: Schlager
- Instrument: Vocals

Chris Howland (30 July 1928 – 29 November 2013) was an English radio and television presenter, schlager singer and actor who was active in Germany for most of his career. He began as Germany's first disc jockey with the NWDR in Hamburg, becoming popular, later also as television presenter.

== Early years ==
John Christopher Howland was born in London on 30 July 1928; his father was a journalist for the BBC, and his mother a photographer. He played the piano as a child. His father left the family when he was two; thereafter, he was educated mostly in boarding schools while his mother worked full-time. He was brought up in Southern England and became a professional beekeeper. Drafted to the army in 1945, he was stationed in Germany a year later.

== Career ==
=== Radio and singing ===
In 1948, Howland began to work for the BFN, the broadcaster of the British army, in Hamburg, Germany, and was promoted to chief speaker and head of the music department. He moved on to the NWDR (the precursor of the NDR) in 1952 as Germany's first disc jockey, named Schallplatten-Jockey. The British programmes were popular among German youths who would rather listen to British music than to the comparatively slow contemporary German music. His popularity soon exceeded his actual target audience. He continued talking about records at the Cologne office of the NWDR (the precursor of the WDR) in 1954.

He made his debut as a singer, in German, arguing that many pop singers were successful without a professional singing voice, and he could do the same. He landed two hits, one of them the schlager "Das hab ich in Paris gelernt".

Arguably his most popular show was Musik aus Studio B, running from 1961 to 1969.

Later in his career, he worked as a radio presenter, including the series Spielereien mit Schallplatten for WDR 4, and continued till three days before his death.

=== Television ===
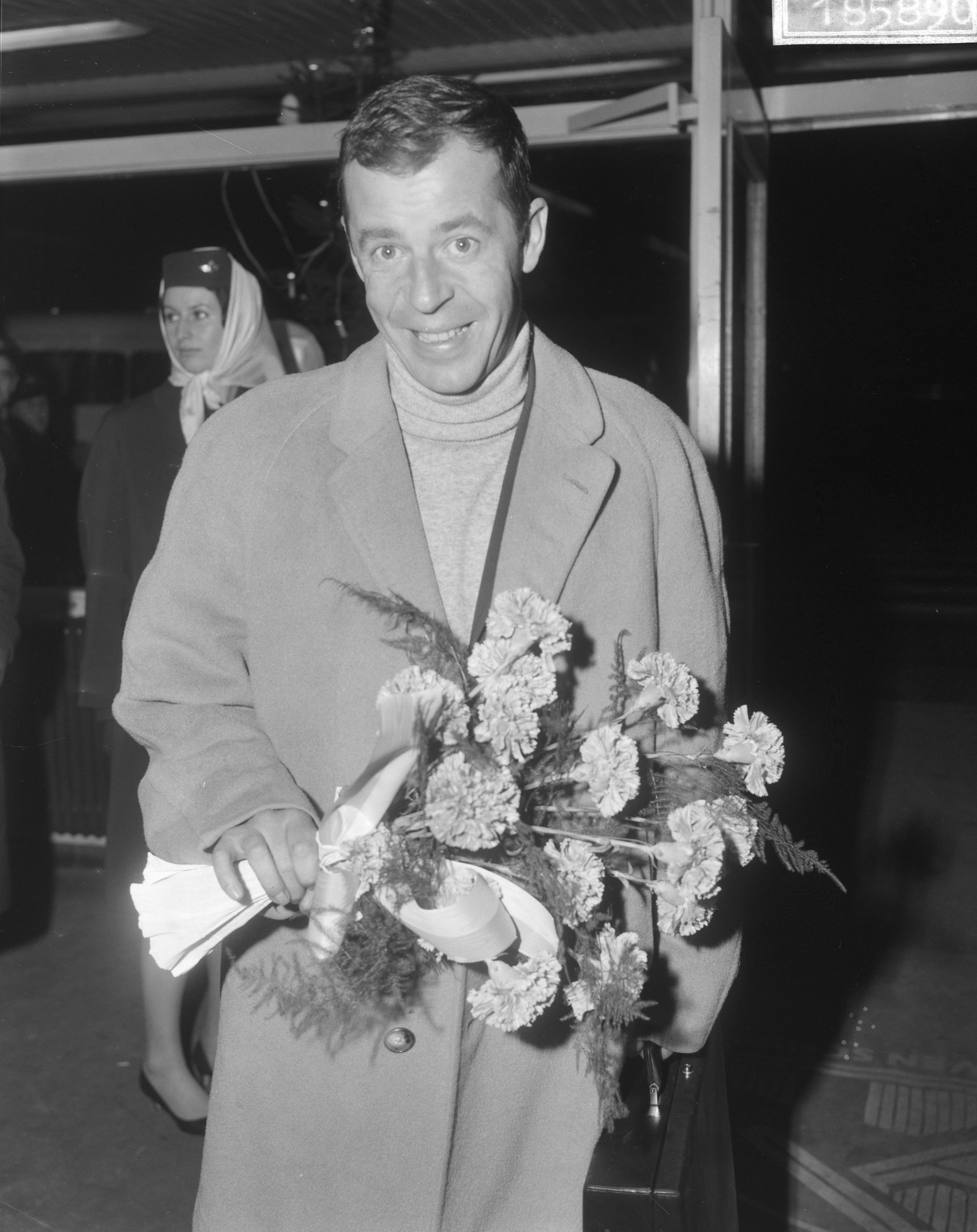
Howland arriving in the Netherlands in 1965

Howland had a show called Peoples and Places on British television from 1959 but he was not as popular as in Germany where the audiences loved his British accent. Two years later he returned to Germany, where he got a show called Musik aus Studio B, which featured pop stars in a new, often humorous way. The show was broadcast more than sixty times in eight years, and achieved cult status. Howland's next coup was a version of Candid Camera for German television, Versteckte Kamera, first presented in 1961. It was stopped in 1963 for concerns about privacy of the people pictured, but was later revived with other moderators. In the 1980s Howland presented Souvenirs, Souvenirs for ARD.

Like the Dutch TV entertainer Rudi Carrell and American musician Bill Ramsey, who also appeared as guest in Howland's show "Studio B", Howland made his accent his trademark.

=== Cinema ===
From 1954, Howland acted in more than twenty films, including Witwer mit fünf Töchtern (Widower with Five Daughters) with Heinz Erhardt. He appeared in six European Karl May films in the 1960s, and was awarded the 2002 Scharlih for them. In 2007 he appeared in a parody in German of Edgar Wallace feature films. He played mainly in comedies which were carried out in a style quite like the British Carry On films, and admitted that he played mostly himself.

== Personal life ==
Until his death, Howland lived outside Cologne. In 2009 he published his memoirs Yes, Sir. The book was well received.

=== Death ===
Howland died in Rösrath near Cologne on 29 November 2013, at age 85. Tom Buhrow called him a legend and said that Germans of the 1950s became familiar with new international hits through him, he made them laugh and dance, writing WDR history, with his personal accent, his British humour and his exquisite music selection.

== Films ==
Films with Howland include:

- Ball of Nations (1954), as Dr. Johnson
- The Major and the Bulls (1955), as Sergeant Bobby
- Engagement at Wolfgangsee (1956), as James Milroy
- Widower with Five Daughters (1957), as Mr. Printice
- The Blue Sea and You (1959), as Christopher Greenwood
- A Thousand Stars Aglitter (1959), as Freddy
- I Learned That in Paris (1960), as Fred Miller
- The Secret of the Black Trunk (1962) as Arnold Wickerley
- The White Spider (1963), as Gideon
- The Hangman of London (1963), as Tom Jenkins
- The Black Panther of Ratana (1964), as Charly
- Mission to Hell (1964), as Smokie
- The Shoot (1964), as Archibald
- Fanny Hill (1964), as Mr. Norbert
- Legacy of the Incas (1965), as Don Parmesan
- Halløj i himmelsengen (1965), as Franz Joseph
- Wild Kurdistan (1965), as Archibald
- Kingdom of the Silver Lion (1965), as Archibald
- Agent 505: Death Trap in Beirut (1966), as Robert O'Toole
- Blood at Sundown (1966), as Doodle Kramer
- Two Undercover Angels (1969). as Francis McClune
- Kiss Me Monster (1969), as Francis McClune
- Who's Crazy, Doc? (1982), as Mr. Anderson
- Neues vom Wixxer (2007), as Hudson
