= Ana Casares =

Polish-Argentine film actress

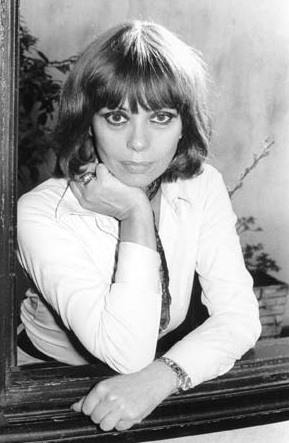
- Ana Casares (1960)
- Born: Ana Urman; 1930; Stanislawów, Poland
- Died: March 13, 2007 (aged 76–77); Buenos Aires
- Years active: 1951–1980

Ana Casares (1930 in Stanisławów, Poland – March 13, 2007 in Buenos Aires) was a Polish-Argentine film actress. She starred in 30 films between 1951 and 1980.

In 1933 she moved with her parents to Argentina. She studied acting skills at Heddy Krill. Since 1952 - on the stage. Since 1951, in the Argentine cinema. Casares made her debut in 1951 in the Juan Carlos Thorry film El Complejo de Felipe and in 1962 appeared in Buscando a Mónica. Since 1962, she filmed in Europe, mainly in Spain. She also played at theaters in Madrid. At the beginning of the 1970s, she returned to Buenos Aires, where she continued her acting career. After 1980 she left the cinema and theatre. Ana Casares was called the Argentine "Brigitte Bardot".

She died on 13 March 2007, aged 77, and is buried in the cemetery of La Tablada in Buenos Aires.

== Filmography ==
- 1951: El complejo de Felipe
- 1956: El último perro
- 1956: El tango en París
- 1958: Demasiado jóvenes
- 1958: El Jefe
- 1959: Campo virgen
- 1959: Aquello que amamos
- 1960: Dos tipos con suerte
- 1961: This Time It Must Be Caviar (uncredited)
- 1962: Searching for Monica
- 1962: Three Fables of Love
- 1963: La muerte y el leñador (Short)
- 1963: El diablo en vacaciones
- 1963: Día a día (TV Series, 2 episodes)
- 1963: El juego de la verdad
- 1964: La noche al hablar (TV Series, 1 episode)
- 1964: Two Gangsters in the Wild West
- 1963-1965: Confidencias (TV Series, 4 episodes)
- 1965: Beach of Formentor
- 1965: El marqués
- 1967: Up the MacGregors!
- 1967: Las 12 caras de Juan (TV Series, 1 episode)
- 1968: 1001 Nights
- 1969: Two Undercover Angels
- 1969: Adiós cordera
- 1969: Kiss Me Monster
- 1969: La vida continúa
- 1971: Una luz en la ciudad (TV Series, 14 episodes)
- 1971: Jueves sorpresa (TV Series, 1 episode)
- 1975: Kid Head
- 1975: El Pibe Cabeza
- 1980: Trampa para un soñador (TV Series, 97 episodes)
- 1981: Me caso con vos (TV Series, 18 episodes)
- 1981: Barracas al sur (TV Series 1981, 29 episodes)
- 1982: Juan sin nombre (TV Series, 39 episodes)
