= Da Istanbul ordine di uccidere =

- Directed by: Carlo Ferrero
- Produced by: Alberto Marras
- Starring: Mauro Parenti
- Cinematography: Hugh Hamilton
- Music by: Alessandro Brugnolini
- Release date: 1965
- Country: Italy
- Language: Italian

Da Istanbul ordine di uccidere or From Istanbul, Orders To Kill is a 1965 Italian Eurospy film co-written and directed by Carlo Ferrero. It was based on the 1960 novel The Devil's Executor by Robert Nilsen.

== Cast ==
- Mauro Parenti as John
- Lucia Modugno as Olga
- Lucretia Love as Leah
- Janine Reynaud as Janine
- Nino Fuscagni as Hogan
- Paul Muller
