= Mission to Caracas =

Mission spéciale à Caracas
- Directed by: Raoul André
- Written by: Claude Rank (novel); Raoul André; Jean Curtelin
- Cinematography: Pierre Petit
- Music by: Michel Magne
- Release date: 1965
- Running time: 78 minutes
- Countries: Spain, France, Italy
- Language: French

Mission to Caracas or Mission spéciale à Caracas is a 1965 spy film directed by Raoul André.

== Plot ==
Special agent Becker (Roland Carey) is after a briefcase that contains some secret documents. The documents are being smuggled aboard a cruise ship but, as luck would have it...

== Cast ==
- Roland Carey ... Gil Becker (as Rod Carter)
- Jany Clair ... Caroline
- Louise Carletti ... Martine de Lainville
- Michel Lemoine ... Loys Lequemenec
- Janine Reynaud ... Véronique
- Saro Urzì ... Emile Vasson
- Alain Gottvalles ... Commissaire DeBreuil
- Yvonne Monlaur ... Muriel
- Christa Lang ... Christelle
- Dominique Page ... Lydia
- Dominique Saint Pierre ... Yannick
- Mireille Granelli ... Dominique
- Sonia Bruno ... Laura
- Christian Kerville ... Boris Gordine
- Paul Demange ... Cicéron
