= The Murderer with the Silk Scarf =

1966 film

- Directed by: Adrian Hoven
- Written by: Adrian Hoven; Wolf Neumeister; Rolf Becker; Thea Tauentzien (novel)
- Produced by: Pier A. Caminnecci; Adrian Hoven
- Starring: Carl Möhner; Folco Lulli; Harald Juhnke
- Cinematography: Hans Jura; Bob Klebig
- Music by: Johannes Rediske
- Production companies: Aquila Film Enterprises; Sagittario Film
- Distributed by: Constantin Film
- Release date: 6 May 1966
- Running time: 82 minutes
- Countries: West Germany; Italy
- Language: German

The Murderer with the Silk Scarf (German: Der Mörder mit dem Seidenschal) is a 1966 West German-Italian crime film produced and directed by Adrian Hoven (who also appeared in the film), and starring Carl Möhner, Folco Lulli, Helga Liné and Harald Juhnke.

== Plot ==
Peeking through a mail slot, a little girl sees her mother being murdered by a man, but she is unable to identify the killer. When the police investigate the murder, the killer decides to eliminate the little girl since he knows she is the only witness to the crime.

== Cast ==
- Carl Möhner as Boris Garrett
- Folco Lulli as Polizeirat Erwin Moll
- Harald Juhnke as Oberinspektor Charly Fischer
- Susanne Uhlen as Claudia Sampton
- Adrian Hoven as Waldemar Fürst
- Sonja Romanoff as Wally Specht
- Helga Liné as Prisca Sampton
- Erwin Strahl as Toni Stein
- Ady Berber as Kriminalinspektor Stenzel
- Greta Zimmer as Frau Moll
- Vera Complojer as "Tante" Blaschek
- Astrid Boner as Maria Stein
- Elisabeth Stiepl as Nachbarin Gmeiner

== Bibliography ==
- Simone Petricci. Il Cinema E Siena: La Storia, I Protagonisti, Le Opere. Manent, 1997.
