= Husband and Wife (1952 film) =

- Directed by: Eduardo De Filippo
- Written by: Turi Vasile; Eduardo De Filippo
- Produced by: Paolo Moffa
- Starring: Eduardo De Filippo; Tina Pica; Titina De Filippo
- Cinematography: Enzo Serafin; Pier Ludovico Pavoni
- Edited by: Gisa Radicchi Levi
- Music by: Nino Rota
- Production company: Film Costellazione Produzione
- Release date: 1952
- Running time: 91 minutes
- Country: Italy
- Language: Italian

Husband and Wife (Italian: Marito e moglie) is a 1952 Italian comedy film written, directed and starred by Eduardo De Filippo. It also features Tina Pica, Titina De Filippo and Luciana Vedovelli.

== Cast ==
- Eduardo De Filippo as Matteo Cuomo / Gennaro Imparato
- Titina De Filippo as Concetta Imparato
- Ellida Lorini as Teresinella
- Tina Pica as Rosalia / Fedora
- Luciana Vedovelli as Anna Maria
- Giuseppe Pica as Il figlio scemo
- Vittorio Caprioli
- Riccardo Frera
- Amedeo Girardi
- Sergio Corti

== Bibliography ==
- Frank Burke. A Companion to Italian Cinema. John Wiley & Sons, 2017.
