= Lucretia Love =

American actress (1941–2019)

Lucretia Love (born Lucretia Hickerson, March 25, 1941 - January 9, 2019) was an American actress who was also known as Lucrezia Love Parenti.

== Early years ==
The daughter of Mr. and Mrs. A. L. Hickerson, Love was born in Borger, Texas, on March 25, 1941. She was the oldest of eight children. After graduating from Odessa High School in 1959, she attended Odessa College, the University of Texas, and the University of Oklahoma.

== Career ==
Love's professional debut occurred in Austin, Texas, in 1962. She acted in summer stock theater and in off-Broadway productions. She also worked as a dancer in Las Vegas and was a news commentator on a television station in Austin. In 1962 she worked as a model for the John Robert Powers agency in Austin. Her work on television included making commercials on KTBC in Austin for a fried-chicken restaurant.

Following relocation to Italy in the early 1960s, Love made action thrillers, spaghetti westerns, and films in other genres. Her film credits included The Naked General, The 10th Victim, The Modern Diabolicals, and From Istanbul, Orders to Kill. Her final film appearance was in 1980 in Dr. Heckyl and Mr. Hype.

After Love married, moved to Italy and changed her name, she emerged as a new persona, Lucrezia Parenti. In 1971, she pulled off a hoax when she was announced as a featured guest for an event in Austin, Texas. The Austin American-Statesman newspaper paraphrased the event's chairman's description of Parenti: "Just beginning to hit the variety columns in this country is Miss Parenti, whose beauty, figure and talent are catching the eyes and the pens of amusement editors from coast to coast." The chairman even sought an interpreter to translate from English to Italian. The newspaper later reported that on the night of the event, "Her perfect English startled the audience until it was revealed that she is a native of Odessa and a former Austin resident."

== Art in the Seychelles ==
Love made the transition from acting to instructing about hands-on crafts when she began to teach students in the Seychelles how to use natural material and recyclable items to create works of art. That pursuit began in 1986 when she went to the Seychelles thinking that spending time on the beach would help her recover from an illness. Later, she decided not to leave but to begin teaching art. She started a school, adapting lessons from her education in Odessa into experiences for children there. A lack of sources for purchasing supplies forced her to make use of readily available material. Students used naturally occurring objects such as banana leaves, seaweed, and sugar cane to make paper items that the school's gift shop sold. They used bamboo, coral, and shells to make wind chimes. Love built a kiln to enable them to make ceramic items.

When Love attended an international women's summit in Beijing, China, in 1995, she was recognized for the way she envisioned art for personal expression and for the economic opportunities that her teaching provided by enhancing "low-tech employment" in Sub-Saharan Africa. During a return visit to Texas in 2001. she took a course in using recycled glass items to create blown glass. That skill would enable use of hundreds of wine bottles discarded by tourists that she had scavenged. With training her students would make glass items like beads and paperweights to provide additional income for the school's gift shop.

== Personal life and death ==
Love married Italian actor Mauro Parenti, and they formed the film company I.C.A.R. After his death she married Baptiste Luc. She died on January 9, 2019, at her home in the Seychelles, aged 77.
