= Nando Tamberlani =

Italian film actor (1896–1967)

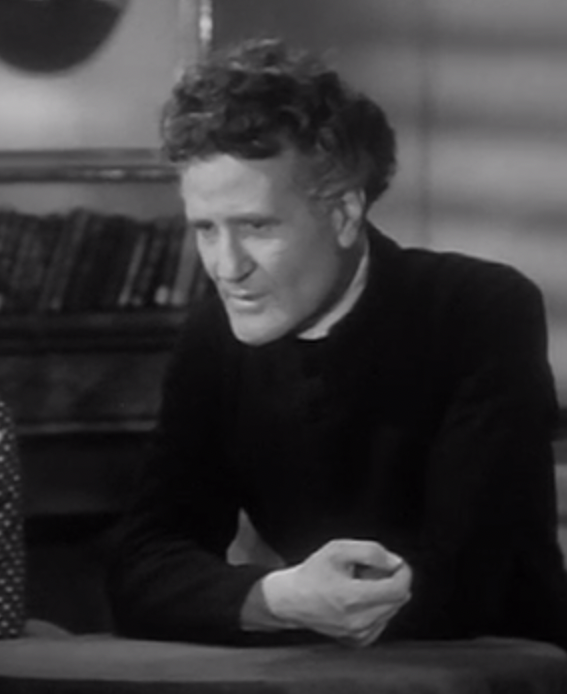
- Tamberlani in the movie Malombra (1942)
- Born: 15 January 1896; Campi Salentina, Apulia, Kingdom of Italy
- Died: 11 May 1967 (aged 71); Milan, Italy
- Occupation: Actor
- Years active: 1937–1967

Nando Tamberlani (1896–1967) was an Italian actor. A character actor in Italian cinema of the postwar era, he was the brother of actor Carlo Tamberlani. Another brother Ermete Tamberlani was also an actor. He appeared in a number of peplum epics during the late 1950s and 1960s.

== Partial filmography ==
- Felicita Colombo (1937) - Giovannk
- Boccaccio (1940)
- Pia de' Tolomei (1941) - Il vecchio conte della Pietra
- Divieto di sosta (1941)
- The Last Dance (1941) - Il rettore de l'Universita
- A Woman Has Fallen (1941) - Un amico di Nora
- Solitudine (1941) - Mr. Caurel
- C'è un fantasma nel castello (1942)
- The Black Panther (1942) - Il professore Ambrus
- Soltanto un bacio (1942) - Il direttore delle Arti Grafiche
- Malombra (1942) - Don Innocenzo
- Redenzione (1943)
- Farewell Love! (1943) - Il maggiordomo di casa Caracciolo
- Malìa (1946) - Il vescovo
- L'apocalisse (1947)
- Biancaneve e i sette ladri (1949)
- The Thief of Venice (1950) - Lombardi
- Gli uomini non guardano il cielo (1952)
- Buon viaggio pover'uomo (1953) - Padre Priore
- Altair (1956)
- The Sword and the Cross (1956) - Proconsul
- Noi siamo le colonne (1956) - Rettore
- The Mighty Crusaders (1957) - Pietro, eremita
- The Warrior and the Slave Girl (1958) - Senatore Lucilio
- The Sword and the Cross (1958) - Caifa
- The Nights of Lucretia Borgia (1959) - Duca d'Alva
- The Loves of Salammbo (1960) - Gran Sacerdote
- Queen of the Pirates (1960) - The Prior
- The Giants of Thessaly (1960) - Padre di Aglaia
- Il sepolcro dei re (1960)
- The Last of the Vikings (1961) - Gultred
- Hercules and the Conquest of Atlantis (1961) - Tiresia
- The Prisoner of the Iron Mask (1961)
- Drakut il vendicatore (1961)
- Mole Men Against the Son of Hercules (1961) - Khur - King of Aran
- The Centurion (1961) - Callicrates
- The Trojan Horse (1961) - Menelaus
- Gold of Rome (1961) - Mr. De Santis
- Suleiman the Conqueror (1961) - Canciellere di Vienna
- The Corsican Brothers (1961) - Count Franchi
- Kerim, Son of the Sheik (1962) - Mansur
- Vanina Vanini (1961)
- Constantine and the Cross (1961)
- Charge of the Black Lancers (1962) - Il re Stefano III
- Gladiator of Rome (1962) - Valerio's Father
- The Fury of Achilles (1962) - Cressus
- The Rebel Gladiators (1962) - Marcus Aurelius
- Imperial Venus (1962) - Pontefice
- Zorro and the Three Musketeers (1963)
- The Fall of Rome (1963) - Matteo
- Ursus in the Land of Fire (1963) - Lotar
- Hercules of the Desert (1964) - Chancellor Gladius
- Hercules Against the Moon Men (1964) - Manata il saggio
- The Revenge of Ivanhoe (1965) - Prior of Wessex

== Bibliography ==
- Roy Kinnard & Tony Crnkovich. Italian Sword and Sandal Films, 1908–1990. McFarland, 2017.
