= Gladiator of Rome =

1962 film

- Directed by: Mario Costa
- Written by: Gian Paolo Callegari; Giuseppe Mariani
- Produced by: Giorgio Agliani
- Starring: Gordon Scott
- Cinematography: Pier Ludovico Pavoni
- Edited by: Antonietta Zita
- Music by: Carlo Franci
- Release date: 13 September 1962 (Italy)
- Running time: 100 minutes (Italy); 105 minutes (United States)
- Country: Italy
- Language: Italian

Gladiator of Rome (Italian: Il gladiatore di Roma) is a 1962 Italian adventure film directed by Mario Costa. Co-written by Gian Paolo Callegari and Giuseppe Mariani, it stars Gordon Scott.

The film is also known as Battles of the Gladiators in the United Kingdom.

== Cast ==
- Gordon Scott as Marcus
- Wandisa Guida as Nista
- Roberto Risso as Valerio Jr.
- Ombretta Colli as Aglae
- Alberto Farnese as Vezio Rufo
- Gianni Solaro as Macrino
- Charles Borromel as Anio
- Piero Lulli as Astarte
- Mirko Ellis as Frasto
- Pietro De Vico as Pompilio
- Nando Tamberlani as Valerio's Father
- Andrea Aureli as Settimio
- Raf Baldassarre as Gladiator
- Célina Cély
- Pietro Tordi as Slaves guard
- Germana Francioli
- Pietro Ceccarelli as Gladiator
- Miranda Campa as Porzia
- Giulio Battiferri as Spy slave
- Leo Garavaglia
- Eleonora Vargas as Prisca

== See also ==
- 1962 in film
- List of Italian films of 1962
