= The Road to Fort Alamo =

1964 film

- Italian film poster
- Directed by: Mario Bava
- Screenplay by: Enzo Gicca Palli; Franco Prosperi; Livia Contardi
- Story by: Enzo Gicca Palli
- Produced by: Achille Piazzi
- Starring: Ken Clark; Jany Clair; Michel Lemoine; Andreina Paul; Alberto Cevenini; Antonio Gradoli
- Cinematography: Ubaldo Terzano
- Edited by: Mario Serandrei
- Music by: Piero Umiliani
- Color process: Eastmancolor
- Production companies: Piazzi Produzione Cinematografica; Protor Film; Comptoir Francis du Film Production
- Distributed by: Belotti Film
- Release dates: 24 October 1964 (Italy); 24 March 1965 (France)
- Countries: Italy; France
- Box office: £373.865 million (Italy)

The Road to Fort Alamo (Italian: La strada per Fort Alamo) is a 1964 Spaghetti Western film directed by Mario Bava.

== Cast ==
- Ken Clark as Bill Mannerly/"Lieutenant John Smith" (Bud Massidy in the English version)
- Jany Clair as Janet
- Michel Lemoine as Kid Carson
- Andreina Paul as Mrs. Collins
- Alberto Cevenini (as Kirk Bert) as Slim Kincaid/"Private Jim Kincaid"
- Gustavo De Nardo (as Dean Ardow) as Sergeant Warwick (Sergeant Carter)
- Antonio Gradoli (as Anthony Gradwell) as Captain Hull (Captain Hollis)
- Gérard Herter (uncredited) as Mr. Silver

== Background and production ==
The Road to Fort Alamo was produced before the conventions of the Spaghetti Western were established with A Fistful of Dollars. European Westerns had become popular when Germany's Rialto Film bought the rights to Karl May's Western novels, and made several films with director Harald Reinl with his Winnetou series. Some of the films in that series were international co-productions involving Italian funding. As they became more successful in Italy, Italian investors began producing their own Westerns with four produced in 1964: Mario Costa's Buffalo Bill, Hero of the Far West, Sergio Corbucci's Minnesota Clay, Sergio Leone's A Fistful of Dollars and The Road to Fort Alamo.

Mario Bava biographer Tim Lucas described The Road to Fort Alamo as resembling the Winnetou films, as opposed to the style Leone developed with A Fistful of Dollars. The Road to Fort Alamo was filmed at Elios Film Studios in Rome and on location between February and March 1964. Michel Lemoine, who had a supporting role in the film, spoke about his work on it with Bava, stating that Bava "was an extraordinary director and he needed all of his talent to get through [The Road to Fort Alamo], because it was really difficult. The producers had money problems with that picture, and Bava had to fight constantly".

Franco Prosperi, who served as one of the film's script writers and Bava's assistant director, expressed distaste towards it, stating that "Mario was useless at making Westerns; he had no talent for it. I disown [The Road to Fort Alamo] completely; it was kind of a disaster."

== Release ==
The Road to Fort Alamo was distributed by Comptoir Français du Film in France on March 24, 1965. In that country, it was retitled Arizona Bill in the tradition of the twenty Arizona Bill films made in France between 1907 and 1913, starring Joe Hamman. In the United States, it was released by World Entertainment Corporation on July 10, 1966.
