= Giuseppe Mariani (art director) =

Italian art director

- Occupation: Art director
- Years active: 1952-1992

Giuseppe Mariani was an Italian art director. He was nominated for an Academy Award in the category Best Art Direction for the film The Taming of the Shrew.

== Filmography ==
- Scapricciatiello (1955).
- Gladiator of Rome (1962)
- The Taming of the Shrew (1967)
- Il Conte Max (1991)
