= Leopoldo Savona =

Film director and screenwriter

- Born: 1922; Latium, Italy
- Died: 2000 (aged 77–78)
- Occupations: Film director, screenwriter, actor, choreographer
- Years active: 1949–1976

Leopoldo Savona (1922–2000) was an Italian film director, screenwriter and occasional actor. He directed 18 films between 1954 and 1976. He was sometimes credited as Leo Colman or Leo Coleman.

== Life and career ==
Born in Lenola, Latina, he started his career in 1949 as assistant director of Giuseppe De Sanctis. He made his directorial debut in 1955, with the adventure film Il principe dalla maschera rossa. He collaborated with Pier Paolo Pasolini as a technical adviser in Mamma Roma.

== Selected filmography ==
Screenwriter and director

- The Prince with the Red Mask (1955)
- Warriors Five (1960)
- The Mongols (1961)
- Arms of the Avenger (1963)
- El Rojo (1966)
- Apocalypse Joe (1970)
- Death Falls Lightly (1972)
- Byleth: The Demon of Incest (1972)
- The Two Orphans (1976)

Actor

- Finishing School (1953)
- The Giant of Metropolis (1961)
