= Pier Ludovico Pavoni =

Italian film director, cinematographer and film producer (born 1926)

Pier Ludovico Pavoni (born 25 April 1926) is an Italian cinematographer, director, producer and screenwriter.

Born in Rome, Pavoni graduated from the Centro Sperimentale di Cinematografia as a camera operator in 1948 and started working in several documentary films, as a camera assistant to Leonida Barboni and Mario Craveri. In 1952 he debuted as a cinematographer in a segment of the comedy film Marito e moglie directed by Eduardo De Filippo. Among other things, he photographed a considerable number of peplum films. Between 1960 and 1971 Pavoni also worked as a producer for the company "Dear". He also directed three successful films in the mid-1970s, two of them based on his own screenplays. He retired in 1989.

In 1956, Pavoni received the award for best photography for Un po' di cielo at the San Sebastián International Film Festival. In 1959 he won the Nastro d'Argento for the cinematography of La muraglia cinese.

== Selected filmography ==
Cinematographer

- Husband and Wife (1952)
- Knights of the Queen (1954)
- Un po' di cielo (1955)
- Noi siamo le colonne (1956)
- Head of a Tyrant (1959)
- Lipstick (1960)
- Mill of the Stone Women (1960)
- Blood Feud (1961)
- The Centurion (1961)
- The Bacchantes (1961)
- Invasion 1700 (1962)
- Planets Against Us (1962)
- Gladiator of Rome (1962)
- Goliath and the Rebel Slave (1963)
- Weapons of Vengeance (1963)
- The Beast of Babylon Against the Son of Hercules (1963)
- The Two Gladiators (1964)
- The Magnificent Gladiator (1964)
- The Triumph of Hercules (1964)
- Messalina vs. the Son of Hercules (1964)
- Revolt of the Praetorians (1964)
- Gladiators Seven (1964)
- The Terror of Rome Against the Son of Hercules (1964)

Director

- Un modo di essere donna (1973)
- Amore libero - Free Love (1974)
- The Sinner (1975)
