= Un po' di cielo =

- Produced by: Giorgio Moser
- Cinematography: Pier Ludovico Pavoni
- Music by: Angelo Francesco Lavagnino
- Release date: 1955
- Country: Italy
- Language: Italian

Un po' di cielo is a 1955 Italian film. It stars actor Gabriele Ferzetti. Its name is Italian for "A bit of heaven".

== Cast ==
- Gabriele Ferzetti as Frank Lo Giudice
- Constance Smith as Nora
- Fausto Tozzi as Roberto Maltoni
- Aldo Fabrizi as Pietro Maltoni
- Peppino De Filippo as Fabrizio Pagani
- Tina Pica as Antonietta
