= Six Days a Week =

- French poster
- Directed by: Luigi Comencini
- Written by: Marcello Fondato
- Cinematography: Armando Nannuzzi
- Edited by: Nino Baragli
- Music by: Benedetto Ghiglia
- Release date: 1965
- Running time: 91 minutes
- Country: Italy
- Language: Italian

Six Days a Week (Italian: La bugiarda, known in France as Le Partage de Catherine) is a 1965 Italian comedy film directed by Luigi Comencini and starring Catherine Spaak. It was adapted from the play by Diego Fabbri.

== Plot ==
Maria is a young beauty who is busy juggling three boyfriends (a count, a dentist and a student) at the same time. She manages this elaborate deception by impersonating her roommate Silvana who is a real life airline hostess. She lies to the count and the dentist about her flight schedules and her whereabouts so she can spend three days a week with each of them. She spends the remaining day of the week with the student who thinks she is a fellow student named Maria. One day the news of the real Silvana's flight disappearance breaks out and she is presumed dead. Comedy and confusion ensue when Maria is forced to come up with a more elaborate scheme to cover her tracks and keep her boyfriends happy.

== Cast ==
- Catherine Spaak as Maria / Silvana / Caterina
- Enrico Maria Salerno as Count Adriano Silveri
- Marc Michel as Arturo Santini
- Riccardo Cucciolla
- Manuel Miranda as Gianni Moraldi
- José Calvo
- Nando Angelini
- Mara Fernández
- Janine Reynaud
- Daina Saronni
- Grazia Martini
- Giuseppe Ranieri
- Mario De Gual
