= White Comanche =

1968 film

- Original film poster
- Directed by: José Briz Méndez (as "Gilbert Lee Kay")
- Written by: Frank Gruber; José Briz Méndez; Manuel Gomez Rivera; Robert I. Holt
- Produced by: Sam White; Philip N. Krasne; Vincente Gomez
- Starring: William Shatner; Joseph Cotten; Perla Cristal; Rosanna Yanni
- Cinematography: Francisco Fraile
- Music by: Jean Ledrut
- Production company: Producciones Cinematográficas A.B.
- Distributed by: Viñals Distribución Galinza Films S.A. (Spain); International Producers Corporation (USA)
- Release date: 1968
- Running time: 93 minutes
- Country: Spain
- Language: Spanish

White Comanche or Comanche blanco or Rio Hondo is a 1968 Spaghetti Western starring William Shatner in a dual role.

The film is listed in Golden Raspberry Award founder John Wilson's book The Official Razzie Movie Guide as one of the 100 Most Enjoyably Bad Movies Ever Made.

== Plot ==
Drifter Johnny Moon (William Shatner) is frequently attacked as he is mistaken for his twin brother Notah who leads Comanche war parties in attacks on the white population whilst he is having visions on peyote. Johnny travels to a Comanche encampment where he challenges his brother to a fight to the death in the town of Rio Hondo.

When Johnny rides into Rio Hondo he finds the town is at boiling point between two warring factions with only Sheriff Logan (Joseph Cotten) keeping the peace. One of the factions discovers Johnny's prowess with his six gun and tries to hire him. Johnny says he will give his answer in four days, after the climax with his brother.

== Cast ==
- William Shatner as Johnny Moon / Notah
- Joseph Cotten as Sheriff Logan
- Rosanna Yanni as Kelly
- Perla Cristal as White Fawn
- Mariano Vidal Molina as General Garcia
- Luis Prendes as Jed Grimes
- Barta Barri as Mayor Bolker
- Vicente Roca as Ellis
- Luis Rivera as Kah To
- Victor Israel as Carter

== Production ==
William Shatner travelled to Spain In March 1967 during a break from his shooting schedule for the Star Trek television show. Producer Sam White recalled that Shatner tried to get the NBC network to buy the film to show on television.
