= Hercules Against the Moon Men =

- Directed by: Giacomo Gentilomo
- Produced by: Luigi Mondello; Robert de Nesle
- Starring: Alan Steel; Jany Clair; Anna Maria Polani; Nando Tamberlani
- Cinematography: Oberdan Troiani
- Edited by: Beatrice Felici
- Music by: Carlo Franci
- Production companies: Nike Cinematografica; Comptoir Francais de Productions Cinematographiques
- Release date: 27 June 1964 (Italy)
- Running time: 90 minutes
- Countries: Italy; France

Hercules Against the Moon Men (Italian: Maciste e la regina di Samar, "Maciste and the Queen of Samar") is a 1964 Franco-Italian international co-production sword and sandal film. It was directed by Giacomo Gentilomo in his final film and stars Alan Steel and Jany Clair. (Note: Alan Steel's real name was Sergio Ciani and he also used the stage name of John Wyler.) The English version of the film runs for 90 minutes and is dubbed.

== Plot ==
In ancient Greece, a race of evil aliens from the Moon land on Earth. For years they have terrorized the nearby city of Samar. Hercules (Maciste in the original version) attempts to free the people of the kingdom of Samar from the rule of their evil queen. She is under the spell of invading Moon Men who demand children for sacrifice in hopes their spilled blood can revive their own dead queen.

The Queen of Samar has made a pact with the Moon Men to conquer the world and become the most powerful woman alive. The downtrodden residents of Samar cheer the arrival of the mighty Hercules, who on their behalf faces deadly obstacles, battles the Moon monsters and eventually confronts the leader of the Moon Men, Redolphis, a metal-headed giant.

== Cast ==
- Alan Steel as Hercules/Maciste
- Jany Clair as Queen Samara
- Anna Maria Polani as Agar
- Nando Tamberlani as Gladius
- Jean-Pierre Honoré as Darix
- Delia D'Alberti as Billis / Selene (as Delia d'Alberti)
- Goffredo Unger as Mogol
- Franco Morici as Timor
- Attilio Dottesio as Remar
- Roberto Ceccacci as Redolphis
- Stefano Carletti as Mogol
- Paola Pitti as Taris (as Paola Piretti)
- Giuliano Raffaelli as Tirteo - tavernkeeper
- Anna Maria Dionisi as Tavernkeeper's wife
- Salvatore Borghese as Aggressor of Maciste upon his arrival
- Antonio Corevi as Rubio, the imperial guard officer

== Production ==
In the original Italian-language version, the hero was not Hercules but Maciste, originally a hero in silent Italian cinema. Hercules Against the Moon Men "blends" elements from a number of mythologies: Roman, Greek, Ancient Egyptian and Cretan elements are all thrown in. Filming took place in Italy, primarily at the Cinecittà Studios, Cinecittà, Rome and in Lazio, Italy.

== Release ==
Hecules Against the Moon Men was released in Italy on 27 June 1964. It was released in the United States in May 1965.

== Reception ==
The original Italian title of Hercules Against the Moon Men was Maciste e la regina di Samar (Maciste and the Queen of Samar). The French title of the film was Maciste contre les hommes de pierre (Maciste Against the Men of Stone), but the English distributors dubbed him to be Hercules, because Maciste was not well known to American audiences. For audiences who wanted to see an accurate interpretation of the Hercules story, the film "... made little or no effort to remain faithful to antiquity."

Film historian Gary Allen Smith noted: "In this combination of peplum and science fiction, this silly, but diverting, entry has the indomitable Alan Steel (real name: Sergio Ciani) fight a collection of Moon monsters before the inevitable cataclysm destroys the invaders. In the film's one inventive touch, the sequences which take place in the mountain kingdom of the Moon Men are filmed in sepia tone, rather than full color ... or Cosmicolor, as stated in the American publicity material."

=== MST3K ===
Hercules Against the Moon Men was also shown on Mystery Science Theater 3000, making it infamous for its "Deep Hurting" Sequence (the very long sandstorm sequence). This sequence involved many of the cast floundering around pointlessly in a sandstorm for upwards of five minutes of screen time, in which no plot movement or character development is made at all. The "Deep Hurting" concept is introduced by Dr. Forrester as a follow-up to "Rock Climbing", a pain point of the movie Lost Continent that had previously been shown.

=== DVD releases ===
Hercules Against the Moon Men has received numerous 'bargain box' releases from various studios. The MST3K version of the film was released by Rhino Home Video as part of the 'Collection, Volume 7' box set.

== See also ==
- List of films featuring Hercules
