= Sonny and Jed =

1972 film directed by Sergio Corbucci

- US film poster
- Directed by: Sergio Corbucci
- Screenplay by: Sergio Corbucci; Sabatino Ciuffini; Mario Amendola; Adriano Bolzoni; José María Forqué
- Story by: Sergio Corbucci
- Produced by: Roberto Loyola
- Starring: Tomas Milian; Susan George; Telly Savalas; Rosanna Yanni; Laura Betti
- Cinematography: Luis Cuadrado
- Edited by: Eugenio Alabiso
- Music by: Ennio Morricone
- Production companies: Roberto Loyola Cinematografica; Orfeo Producciones Cinematográficas; Terra-Filmkunst
- Distributed by: Titanus (Italy); K-tel Motion Pictures (US)
- Release date: 11 August 1972
- Running time: 97 minutes
- Countries: Italy; Spain; West Germany
- Languages: Italian; English

Sonny and Jed (Italian: La banda J. & S. - Cronaca criminale del Far-West, lit. "The J. & S. Gang - Criminal Chronicle of the Far West"), also known as Bandera Bandits, is a 1972 Italian Spaghetti Western film about a sheriff's (Sheriff Franciscus, played by Telly Savalas) relentless effort to stop a robber (Jed, played by Tomas Milian) and his girlfriend (Sonny, played by Susan George). The film was directed by Sergio Corbucci and is noted for its music, scored by Ennio Morricone.

== Plot ==
Jed Trigado is a solitary bandit who steals from the rich to give to the poor, in the Mexican region of Bandera.

== Cast ==
- Tomas Milian: Jed Trigado
- Susan George: Sonny Trigado, née Lester
- Telly Savalas: Sheriff Franciscus
- Rosanna Yanni : Linda Moreno (as Rossana Yanni)
- Laura Betti: Betty
- Franco Giacobini: Aparacito
- Eduardo Fajardo: Don Garcia Moreno
- Herbert Fux: Merril
- Gene Collins : Hotel Owner (as Gene Collings)
- Werner Pochath : Pistolero (as Wernet Pochat)
- Álvaro de Luna : Sheriff (as Alvaro De Luna)

== Reception ==
The Spaghetti Western Movie Database recalls that "The film was almost unanimously labelled as a failure upon its initial release" and considers that the film is "Not an easy film. As a comedy it's often too crude to be funny, and as a western it's a bit short on action. There are moments of intense, violent action, but they're few and far between." However the same review praises "Morricone's unobtrusive, wistful score (that) serves the movie quite well" and depicts some visual aspects of the film as of "Fellinesque beauty."
