= Kerim, Son of the Sheik =

- Directed by: Mario Costa
- Written by: Nino Stresa
- Starring: Gordon Scott
- Cinematography: Angelo Lotti
- Music by: Francesco De Masi
- Release date: 1962
- Language: Italian

Kerim, Son of the Sheik (Italian: Il figlio dello sceicco, French: Le retour du fils du cheik, also known just as Son of the Sheik) is a 1962 Italian-French adventure film directed by Mario Costa and starring Gordon Scott.

== Cast ==
- Gordon Scott as Kerim
- Cristina Gajoni as Fawzia
- Moira Orfei as Zaira
- Alberto Farnese as Omar
- Gordon Mitchell as Yussuf
- Grazia Maria Spina as Laila
- Nando Tamberlani as Mansur
- Luciano Benetti as Prince Ahmed
- Jany Clair as Prisoner
- Nando Angelini as Akim
