= Byleth: The Demon of Incest =

- Italian film poster featuring art by Mario Piavano.
- Directed by: Leopoldo Savona
- Screenplay by: Leopoldo Savona
- Story by: Leopoldo Savona
- Starring: Mark Damon; Marie-Claude Parin; Aldo Bufi Landi; Franco Jamonte
- Cinematography: Giovanni Crisci
- Edited by: Otelo Colangeli
- Music by: Vasil Kojukaroff
- Production company: Agata Films
- Distributed by: Panta Cinematografica
- Release date: 31 May 1972 (Itatly)
- Running time: 95 minutes
- Country: Italy

Byleth: The Demon of Incest (Italian: Byleth (il demone dell'incesto)) is a 1972 Italian gothic horror film directed and written by Leopoldo Savona. Set in 19th-century Italy, the film features Mark Damon as Lionello Shandell who welcomes his sister Barbara (Claudia Gravy) and her new husband Giordano (Aldo Bufi Landi) back to their castle after their trip to England. The two siblings are strongly affectionate for each other and the new marriage has caused Lionello into a mad jealousy which Giordano tries to cure as murders begin mysteriously happening around the castle.

Byleth: The Demon of Incest was shot in Rome and released in Italy and later in Germany where it was re-edited and featured more explicit scenes of nudity and different editing.

== Production ==
Byleth: The Demon of Incest was directed by Leopoldo Savona, a filmmaker mostly known for being an assistant director for Luigi Zampa, Riccardo Freda, and Pier Paolo Pasolini. After making a few spaghetti westerns, Savona directed the gothic film Byleth: The Demon of Incest. The film was shot at Borgo del Sasso, Cerveteri, Manziana, and Elios Film Studios, all located in or close to Rome.

For the film, Savona borrowed the demon Beleth from the 16th century treatise Pseudomonarchia Daemonum.

== Release ==
Byleth: The Demon of Incest was distributed theatrically in Italy by Panta Cinematografica on 31 May 1972 with a running time of 95 minutes. A film poster for the Italian release's poster featured very similar art to Il sesso della strega.

On its release in Germany in 1975 as Trio der Lust, the film was significantly different: its running time was 81 minutes, removed dialogues scenes and had more female nudity including actress Caterina Chiani who appears in many Italian softcore pornography films in the 1970s. Both the German and Italian DVD releases of the film contain the German version of the film. Severin Films announced a blu-ray of the film for October 29, 2019 featuring a 2k scan from the negative elements that had been discovered in a Madrid lab vault.

== Reception ==
From retrospective reviews, critic and film historian Roberto Curti states that "apart from the emphasis on nudity [...] there is little to recommend in Byleth", noting a "muddled and slow moving" plot and the film's very low budget. Discussing the acting in the film, Curti points out that Mark Damon "gives one of the worst performances in the history of Italian horror" and that he was constantly doubled in the film, except for the last scene. Jonathan Rigby found it to be "a handsomely appointed, and commendably brief, item" to which Savona "brings a great deal of elegance and poise [...] In fact, there's a bit too much poise; not a great deal happens and the going is slow." He concedes that "there are some artful highlights [...] [in which] Savona works up a bewitching atmosphere," but points out that the ending is "a damp squib".

== See also ==
- List of Italian films of 1972
- List of horror films of 1972
