= Jany Clair =

French actress

- Born: Jany Guillaume; 2 September 1938 (age 87); Lille, France
- Occupation: Actor
- Years active: 1957-1966
- Height: 5 ft 6 in (168 cm)

Jany Clair (born 2 September 1938) is a retired French actress.

Clair was born Jany Guillaume in Lille, France. She starred in a number of B-grade films in the 1950s and 1960s, in particular in a number of sword and sandal films.

== Filmography ==
- 1957 Mademoiselle et son gang
- 1959 Legions of the Nile- Ray's elder sister.
- 1960 The Night They Killed Rasputin - Irina Yousoupoff.
- 1960 Lay Off Blondes - Jo
- 1961 Conqueror of Maracaibo - Doña Isabella Valdez
- 1961 The Prisoner of the Iron Mask
- 1962 79 A.D. - Myrta
- 1962 The Prisoner of the Iron Mask
- 1962 Planets Against Us - Audrey Bradbury
- 1962 Kerim, Son of the Sheik
- 1963 Weapons of Vengeance
- 1964 The Road to Fort Alamo - Janet.
- 1964 Hercules Against the Moon Men
- 1965 Mission to Caracas - Caroline.
- 1965 Ces dames s'en mêlent - Casino Barmaid
- 1965 The Exterminators - Héléna Jordan
