= It Came from Somewhere Else =

1988 film

- Directed by: Howard Hassler
- Written by: Patrick V. Johnson
- Produced by: John Bruhn
- Starring: William Vanarsdale
- Cinematography: Dan Jones
- Release date: 1988
- Running time: 90 minutes
- Country: United States
- Language: English

It Came from Somewhere Else is a 1988 motion picture comedy directed by Howard Hassler. It is a spoof of sci-fi films and is a B-movie. Kung fu aliens from space have invaded the small town of Grand Bosh, accompanied by a surge of spontaneous human combustion and other mysterious phenomena in this awkward spoof of 1950s sci-fi.

== Cast ==
- William Vanarsdale as Sheriff Ed Munchinson
- Don Aldrich as Deputy Don
- Robert Buckley as Doc Savel
- Allen M. Johnson as Joe Drunk
- Richard Speeter as Mr. Buckner
- George Carlson as Mayor Shrank
- Paul Zdechlik as Wendell Shrank
- Jane Rudowski as Julie Buckner
- Terry Royalty as Cindy
- Larry Sutin as Art Rumbo
- Mike McDonough as Morgan McDougal
- Joseph Hautman as Smith Ambrose
- Robert L. Speeter as The President
- John Bruhn as Fred O'Wardy / Mac
- Jerry Trigg as Don Fuller
