= Ragazzi del Juke-Box =

1959 film directed by Lucio Fulci

- Film poster
- Directed by: Lucio Fulci
- Written by: Lucio Fulci; Piero Vivarelli; Vittorio Vighi
- Produced by: Giovanni Addessi
- Starring: Mario Carotenuto; Elke Sommer; Anthony Steffen
- Cinematography: Carlo Montuori
- Edited by: Gabriele Varriale
- Music by: Eros Sciorilli
- Production company: Era Cinematografica
- Distributed by: Lux Film
- Release date: 28 August 1959 (Rome)
- Running time: 102 minutes
- Country: Italy
- Language: Italian
- Box office: ITL 425.43 million

Ragazzi del Juke-Box (lit. The Juke Box Kids) is a 1959 Italian musicarello film directed and co-written by Lucio Fulci. The film stars Mario Carotenuto, Elke Sommer and Anthony Steffen.

== Plot ==
Sir Cesari runs a record company that promotes the classical music he loves. But when he goes to prison, his attractive young daughter Giulia takes over the company and uses it to promote rock n' roll singers instead.

== Cast ==
- Mario Carotenuto as Commander Cesari
- Elke Sommer as Giulia Cesari
- Anthony Steffen as Paolo Macelloni
- Giacomo Furia as Gennarino
- Yvette Masson as Maria Davanzale
- Fred Buscaglione and his Asternovas as Fred and his band
- Adriano Celentano and the Modern Jazz Gang as Adriano and his band
- Betty Curtis as Betty Dorys
- Gianni Meccia as Jimmy
- Tony Dallara as Tony Bellaria
- Mario Ambrosino as il contino
- Giuliano Mancini as Jimmy
- Karin Well as Girl at club
- Umberto D'Orsi
- Enzo Garinei
- Ornella Vanoni
- Lucio Fulci as Festival organizer

== Development ==
I ragazzi del juke box was an Italian film production from Era Cinematografica based in Rome. It was shot under the title of Ti duro... che tu mi piaci with interios shot a Incir-De Paolis Studios in Rome. Director and screenwriter Lucio Fulci has a uncredited speaking role cameo in the film as a festival organizer.

== Release ==
I ragazzi del juke box was distributed by Lux Film in Italy. It was screened in Rome on August 28, in Turin on September 1, in Brindisi on September 26, and on November 12, 1959 in Bari. It grossed a total of 425.43 million Italian lire in the Italian box office.
