= Rosanna Yanni =

Argentine actress

Marta Susana Yanni Paxot (born February 27, 1938), best known as Rosanna Yanni or Rossana Yanni, is an Argentine film actress.

Career

She debuted in her home town, working in revues as a chorus girl. After working two years as a fashion model in Italy, in 1963 she moved to Madrid and there began her film career. She starred in over 40 films between 1963 and 1980, and after a long pause resumed her career in the late nineties.

== Selected filmography ==
- The Wild Ones of San Gil Bridge (1966)
- White Comanche (1968)
- The Mark of the Wolfman (1968) a.k.a. Frankenstein's Bloody Terror, starring Paul Naschy
- Two Undercover Angels (1969)
- Malenka, the Vampire's Niece (1969)
- Bridge Over the Elbe (1969)
- Cross Current (1971)
- Sonny and Jed (1972)
- What Am I Doing in the Middle of a Revolution? (1972)
- Hunchback of the Morgue (1973) starring Paul Naschy
- War Goddess (1973)
- Count Dracula's Great Love (1974) starring Paul Naschy
- La escopeta nacional (1977)
- Al Lìmite (1997)
