= Warriors Five =

Warriors Five La guerra continua
- Directed by: Leopoldo Savona
- Written by: Gino De Santis; Ugo Pirro; Leopoldo Savona
- Produced by: Fulvio Lucisano
- Starring: Jack Palance; Giovanna Ralli; Serge Reggiani
- Cinematography: Claudio Racca
- Edited by: Gabriele Varriale
- Music by: Armando Trovajoli; Les Baxter (US version); Ronald Stein (US version)
- Distributed by: American International Pictures
- Release date: October 1962
- Running time: 71 minutes (US)
- Country: Italy
- Language: English

Warriors Five (Italian: La guerra continua, French: La dernière attaque) is a 1962 black and white Italian-French-Yugoslavian international co-production war film directed by Leopoldo Savona and starring Jack Palance, Giovanna Ralli, and Serge Reggiani. It is set during World War II. It was released in the US by American International Pictures as a double feature with Samson and the Seven Miracles of the World.

== Plot summary ==
In German-occupied Italy during World War II, American paratrooper Jack (Jack Palance) lands behind enemy lines and begins an espionage assignment. He ends up captured and imprisoned. With four Italian POWs, he manages to escape. He then talks them into helping him blow up a strategically important bridge. Mayhem ensues until the only people left are the hero and Italia (Giovanna Ralli), a lovely Italian hooker.

== Cast ==
- Jack Palance as Jack
- Giovanna Ralli as Italia
- Serge Reggiani as Libero
- Folco Lulli as Marzi
- Venantino Venantini as Alberto
- Franco Balducci as Conti
- Miha Baloh as Sansone
- Vera Murko as Mafalda
- Bruno Scipioni as Angelino
