= Adrian Hoven =

Austrian actor (1922–1981)

- Born: Wilhelm Arpad Hofkirchner; 18 May 1922; Wöllersdorf, Austria
- Died: 8 April 1981 (aged 58); Tegernsee, West Germany
- Occupations: Actor; film director
- Years active: 1947–1981

Adrian Hoven (18 May 1922 – 8 April 1981) was an Austrian actor, producer and film director. He appeared in 100 films between 1947 and 1981.

== Biography ==
He was born in Wöllersdorf, Austria as Wilhelm Arpad Hofkirchner and died in Tegernsee, West Germany.

== Selected filmography ==
=== Actor ===
- Quax in Africa (1947) - Statist (uncredited)
- King of Hearts (1947)
- Tromba (1949) - Rudy Walheim, Sportstudent
- The Prisoner (1949) - Victor
- Der Dorfmonarch (1950) - Stefan Wimpflinger - der Sohn
- Who Is This That I Love? (1950) - Franz
- The Orplid Mystery (1950) - (uncredited)
- The White Hell of Pitz Palu (1950) - Peter Hofkirchner
- Dr. Holl (1951) - Tonio / Gardener
- Das seltsame Leben des Herrn Bruggs (1951) - Rupert - sein Sohn
- Maria Theresa (1951) - Leutnant Cordona
- Heimat, deine Sterne (1951) - Jagerloisl
- Captive Soul (1952)
- The White Adventure (1952) - Dr. Peter Wiedemann
- I Can't Marry Them All (1952) - Fredi
- Season in Salzburg (1952) - Heinz Doll
- I Lost My Heart in Heidelberg (1952) - Tony de Boers
- Carnival in White (1952) - Hans Brugger
- Hannerl (1952) - Peter Bergmeister
- Marriage for One Night (1953) - Komma
- Stars Over Colombo (1953) - Gowaran
- Hooray, It's a Boy! (1953) - Dr. Kurt Wehling
- The Prisoner of the Maharaja (1954) - Gowaran
- My Sister and I (1954) - Rudi Becker
- The Big Star Parade (1954) - Peter Hofer
- Victoria in Dover (1954) - Prince Albert of Sachsen-Coburg
- Canaris (1954) - Capt. Althoff
- Secrets of the City (1955) - Gerhard Scholz
- Marriage Sanitarium (1955) - Stefan Seidlitz, Journalist
- Heimatland (1955) - Hans Bachinger
- Her First Date (1955) - Rolf
- As Long as You Live (1955) - Michael
- The Three from the Filling Station (1955) - Peter
- Lügen haben hübsche Beine (1956) - Arzt
- Pulverschnee nach Übersee (1956) - Bertl Unteraigner - Skilehrer
- Opera Ball (1956) - Richard Stelzer
- Like Once Lili Marleen (1956) - Franz Brugger
- Bonsoir Paris, bonjour l'amour (1956) - Paul Freitag
- Kaiserjäger (1956) - Oberleutnant Pacher
- Nature Girl and the Slaver (1957) - Frank
- Scherben bringen Glück (1957) - Heinz Kersten, Komponist
- The Unexcused Hour (1957) - Dr. Hans Weiringk
- Vienna, City of My Dreams (1957) - Peter Lehnert, Musikprofessor
- Lilli (1958) - Bill Morton
- The Beautiful Legs of Sabrina (1958) - Mario Martino
- Rommel Calls Cairo (1959) - Capt. Johannes Eppler, alias Hussein Gafaar
- A Doctor of Conviction (1959) - Dr. Manfred Wiegand
- I Aim at the Stars (1960) - Mischke
- The Mystery of the Green Spider (1960) - Ted Wagner
- Foxhole in Cairo (1960) - John Eppler
- Island of the Amazons (1960) - Manuel
- The White Horse Inn (1960) - Dr. Siedler
- We Will Never Part (1960) - Guido Terni
- Ach Egon! (1961) - Dr. Kurt Wehling
- Am Sonntag will mein Süsser mit mir segeln gehn (1961) - Horst, der Scheidungsanwalt
- So liebt und küsst man in Tirol (1961) - Paul Kramer
- The Puzzle of the Red Orchid (1962) - Inspector Weston
- The Post Has Gone (1962) - Willy
- Don't Fool with Me (1963) - Modeschöpfer, Maler und Lehrer Raul Thorsten
- The Black Cobra (1963) - Peter Karner
- With Best Regards (1963) - Hans Neubauer, Lohnbuchhalter
- Tomfoolery in Zell am See (1963) - Mark Fürberg
- Cave of the Living Dead (1964) - Insp. Frank Dorin
- Tim Frazer and the Mysterious Mister X (1964) - Tim Frazer
- Seven Hours of Gunfire (1965) - Wild Bill Hickok
- Jesse James' Kid (1965) - Allan
- The Murderer with the Silk Scarf (1966) - Waldemar Fürst (uncredited)
- To Skin a Spy (1966) - Kern
- Scorpions and Miniskirts (1967) - Paul Riviere
- Sin with a Discount (1968) - Arzt
- Succubus (1968) - Ralf Drawes
- Im Schloß der blutigen Begierde (1968) - Georg V. Kassell (voice, uncredited)
- Two Undercover Angels (1969) - Mr. Radeck
- Kiss Me Monster (1969) - Eric Vicas
- Mark of the Devil (1970) - Walter - the Nobleman
- The Long Swift Sword of Siegfried (1971) - Blonde and Bearded Showman with the Eggs (uncredited)
- La pente douce (1972) - Le mari
- Mark of the Devil Part II (1973) - Count Alexander von Salmenau (uncredited)
- Martha (1974, TV Movie) - Mr. Heyer, Martha's father
- Fox and His Friends (1975) - Wolf Thiess, Eugen's father
- Das Rückendekolleté (1975)
- Mother Küsters' Trip to Heaven (1975) - Redacteur-in-chief Linke (uncredited)
- Der Edelweißkönig (1975) - Finkenbauer
- Inside Out (1975) - Dr. Maar
- Shadow of Angels (1976) - Herr Müller, ihr Mann
- Satan's Brew (1976) - Arzt im Krankenhaus
- Petty Thieves (1977)
- Waldrausch (1977) - Angelo
- Halbe-Halbe (1977) - Bettler
- Despair (1978) - Inspector Schelling
- Goetz von Berlichingen of the Iron Hand (1979) - Jäger Lerse
- Das Ding (1979, TV film) - Josip
- Car-napping (1980) - Entrepreneur Benninger
- Lili Marleen (1981) - Ginsberg
- Looping (1981) - Capone

=== Director or producer ===
In 1965 Hoven teamed up with wealthy Siemens stockholder Pier Andrea Caminneci (25 July 1941 – 30 December 2013) to form Aquila Film Enterprises. The company allowed Hoven to not only produce and star in films he wanted to make, but also to direct some of their films.

- The Murderer with the Silk Scarf (1966)
- Scorpions and Miniskirts (1967 directed by Ramón Comas)
- Succubus (1968, directed by Jesús Franco)
- Im Schloß der blutigen Begierde (1968)
- Two Undercover Angels (1969, directed by Jesús Franco)
- Mark of the Devil (1970, directed by Michael Armstrong)
- The Long Swift Sword of Siegfried (1971)
- Mark of the Devil Part II (1973)
- Dandelions (1974)
