= The Prisoner of the Iron Mask =

- Directed by: Francesco De Feo
- Written by: Silvio Amadio; Francesco De Feo; Ruggero Jacobbi
- Produced by: Francesco Thellung
- Starring: Michel Lemoine; Wandisa Guida
- Cinematography: Antonio Schiavo Lena
- Music by: Carlo Innocenzi
- Distributed by: American International Pictures
- Release date: 1962
- Countries: Italy; France
- Language: Italian

The Prisoner of the Iron Mask (Italian: La vendetta della maschera di ferro, French: La vengeance du masque de fer) is a 1962 Italian-French swashbuckler film. It was directed by Francesco De Feo.

== Cast ==
- Michel Lemoine as Marco
- Wandisa Guida as Christina
- Andrea Bosic
- Jany Clair as Isabelle
- Pietro Albani as Andrea
- Silvio Bagolini as Count Astolfo
- Emma Baron
- Andrea Fantasia
- Piero Pastore
- Erminio Spalla
- Nando Tamberlani
- Mimmo Poli
- Marco Tulli
