= Mario Carotenuto =

Italian actor (1916–1995)

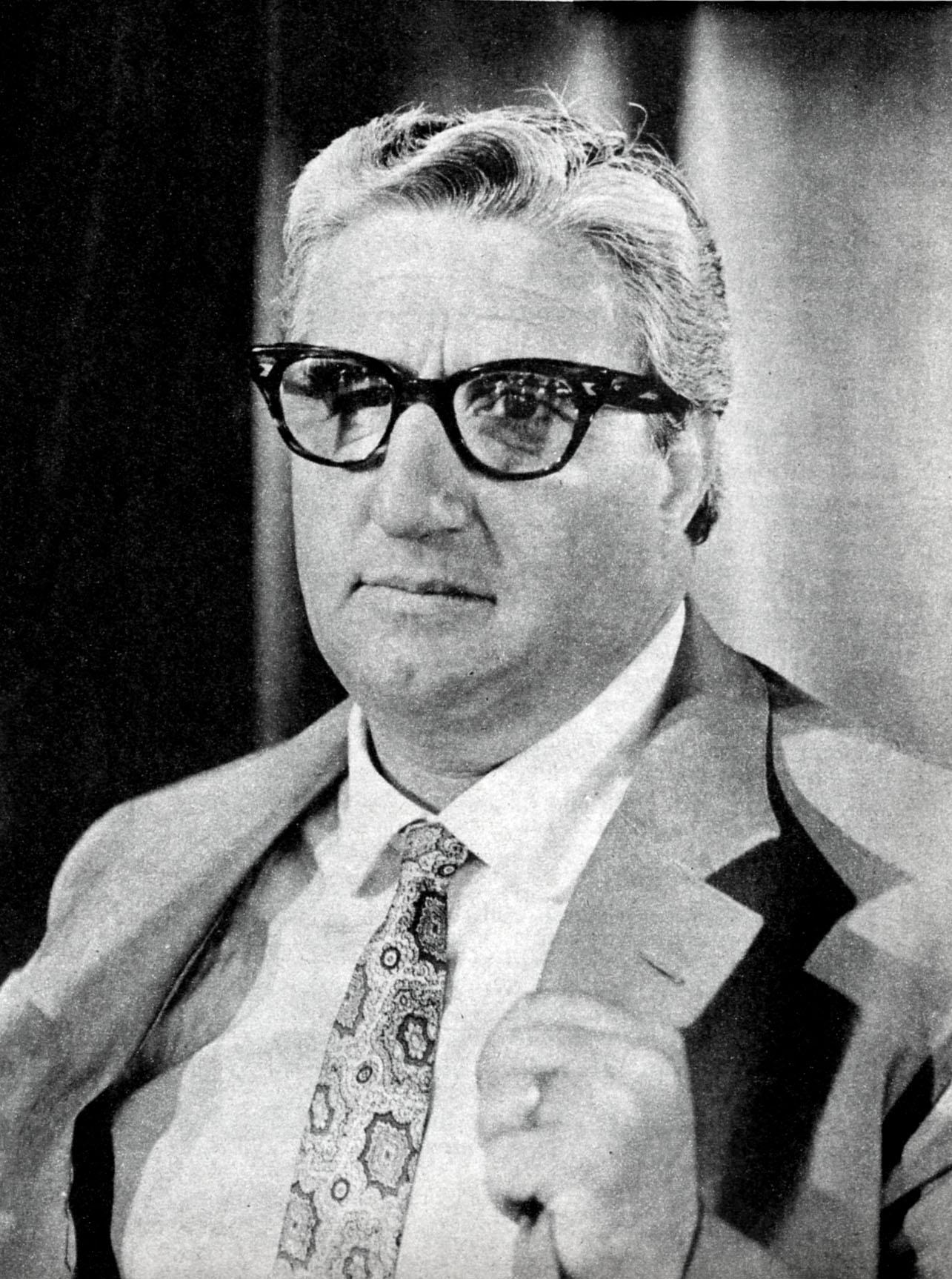
- Carotenuto in 1963
- Born: 30 June 1916; Rome, Lazio, Italy
- Died: 14 April 1995 (aged 78); Rome, Italy
- Years active: 1937–1995
- Spouse(s): Luisa Poselli (m. 1953–1974) Gabriella Cottignoli (m. ?–1995)
- Children: 1
- Relatives: Bruno Carotenuto (nephew)

Mario Carotenuto (30 June 1916 – 14 April 1995) was an Italian actor of film and theatre.

== Biography ==
Carotenuto is the son of Nello Carotenuto, a silent film actor, and younger brother of the actor Memmo Carotenuto.

After the 1943 Armistice of Cassibile he showed sympathy for the Italian Social Republic, where he was enlisted in the Italian Waffen SS.

He took various humble jobs for many years before starting his own artistic career in 1946, first as a radio actor and then joining small avanspettacolo companies.

He made his film debut in 1950, in Abbiamo vinto, going on to perform as leading or supporting actor in dozens of films, often comedies. He was also very active on stage and television.

He died in Rome in 1995.

== Awards ==
- 1973 Nastro d'argento for best Supporting Actor for the film The Scientific Cardplayer

== Filmography ==
- Scipio Africanus: The Defeat of Hannibal (1937)
- The Two Sergeants (1951)
- Milano miliardaria (1951)
- Beauties in Capri (1952)
- The Beach (1954)
- A Hero of Our Times (1955)
- Sunset in Naples (1955)
- Kean: Genius or Scoundrel (1956)
- I giorni più belli (1956)
- Nero's Mistress (1956)
- L'amore nasce a Roma (1958)
- Move and I'll Shoot (1958)
- First Love (1959)
- Ragazzi del Juke-Box (1959)
- The Friend of the Jaguar (1959)
- Fountain of Trevi (1960)
- Toto in Madrid (1959)
- His Women (1961)
- Colpo gobbo all'italiana (1962) as Nando Paciocchi
- 5 marines per 100 ragazze (1962)
- La Vendetta (1962)
- Destination Rome (1963)
- Satyricon (1969)
- If It's Tuesday, This Must Be Belgium (1969)
- 1870 (1971)
- I due assi del guantone (1971)
- Boccaccio (1972)
- When Women Were Called Virgins (1972)
- The Scientific Cardplayer (1972)
- Master of Love (1972)
- Pasqualino Cammarata, Frigate Captain (1974)
- Febbre da cavallo (1975)
- The Nurse on a Military Tour (1977)
- Per favore, occupati di Amelia (1981)
- Pierino medico della Saub (1981)
- Cuando calienta el sol... vamos a la playa (1982)
- Gian Burrasca (1982)
- Paulo Roberto Cotechiño centravanti di sfondamento (1983)
- The Story of a Poor Young Man (1995)
