= The Sea (1962 film) =

1962 comedy-drama film

- Directed by: Giuseppe Patroni Griffi
- Screenplay by: Giuseppe Patroni Griffi; Alfio Valdarnini
- Produced by: Gianni Buffardi
- Starring: Umberto Orsini; Françoise Prévost; Dino Mele
- Cinematography: Ennio Guarnieri
- Edited by: Ruggero Mastroianni
- Music by: Giovanni Fusco
- Release date: 1962
- Language: Italian

The Sea (Italian: Il mare) is a 1962 Italian romantic drama film co-written and directed by Giuseppe Patroni Griffi, in his directorial debut. It premiered at the 23rd edition of the Venice Film Festival in the Informativa sidebar.

== Cast ==
- Umberto Orsini as the actor
- Françoise Prévost as the woman
- Dino Mele as the boy
- Renato Scala
- Renato Terra

== Reception ==
A Variety contemporary review panned the film, writing "intentions of author-director Patroni Griffi whose first pic this is may be good and valid, but he doesn't bring it off. Pic is static and generally as dull as the world it wants to portray."

Bianco e Nero's critic Leonardo Autera described it as "a clumsy story [...] peopled with half-formed neurotic characters, that continually derides any credible form of visual narration, [and] is punctuated by long, exasperating shots of nothing".

Paolo Mereghetti noted the Michelangelo Antonioni, Alain Resnais, Gabriele D'Annunzio and André Gide's influences and wrote "Patroni Griffi's directorial debut oozes with aestheticism and literary pretension, and feels heavily dated".
