= Planets Against Us =

- Italian: I pianeti contro di noi French: Le monstre aux yeux verts
- Directed by: Romano Ferrara
- Screenplay by: Romano Ferrara; Piero Pierotti
- Story by: Massimo Rendina
- Produced by: Alberto Chemin; Gaetano Ciccarone; Pier Ludovico Pavoni
- Starring: Michel Lemoine; Maria Pia Luzi; Jany Clair
- Cinematography: Pier Ludovico Pavoni; Angelo Lotti
- Edited by: Luciano Cavalieri
- Music by: Armando Trovajoli
- Production companies: Wanguard Film; P.C. Produzione Cinematografica; Comptoir Français du Film Production
- Distributed by: Cino Del Duca
- Release dates: 14 February 1962 (Italy); 6 June 1962 (France)
- Running time: 83 minutes
- Countries: Italy; France
- Language: Italian

Planets Against Us (original titles: Italian: I pianeti contro di noi, French: Le monstre aux yeux verts) is a 1962 Italian-French science-fiction horror film directed by Romano Ferrara, based on a story by Massimo Rendina. It is also known by the names Planets Around Us, Hands of a Killer, The Man With the Yellow Eyes and The Monster with Green Eyes. It is notable for featuring a planned invasion by cyborgs—humanoid-shaped robots, rather than the common sci-fi film plot of aliens inhabiting, taking over or duplicating humans.

== Plot ==
The plane carrying atomic scientist Prof. Landersen and his son Robert crashes in the Sahara desert, killing everyone on board. Robert's body is not found.

In the United States and USSR several rocket launches fail disastrously, with an individual closely resembling Robert Landersen seen at each at exactly the same time; he then vanishes without trace. The authorities start to suspect the involvement of alien beings, and start a worldwide manhunt to find the mysterious man.

In Rome, artist Audrey Bradbury encounters the man, who behaves oddly. She is attracted to him and he tells her his name is Bronco. Bronco sees a portrait in Audrey's home. He expresses interest in the painting and Audrey tells him the subject is her friend Marina Ferri, who is engaged to Professor Borri, a scientist developing a paralysing gas. Audrey invites Bronco to a party which she knows Marina will be attending. At the party (resembling a scene from a contemporary Fellini film) Bronco meets Marina. She is also attracted to Bronco, who wishes to meet Prof. Borri. They leave the party together and Bronco uses mind control on Marina. Later, Bronco and Marina are stopped in her car by the police. Bronco touches an officer with his bare hand and he dies instantly. Later, at Audrey's home, Audrey tries to kiss Bronco. He believes she has unwittingly betrayed him to the police and touches her back, making her crumble to dust.

Meanwhile, the authorities have concluded the Earth is being attacked by beings from another planet, all with identical appearances based on that of Robert Landersen.

Bronco is drawn to Marina and tells her he is not human. After warning her that humanity is about to make the same mistakes with atomic radiation which destroyed his own planet, he then uses his mind control to make her forget what he has told her and take him to meet Professor Borri. In the professor's laboratory, the police secretly X-ray Bronco and discover he has a metallic skeleton beneath a skin-like covering. They conclude the beings are all made to resemble Robert Landersen, and they intend to invade Earth in search of a new home.

The police attempt to track down Bronco, and a policeman shoots him with a ray gun which seriously injures him. After a car chase through and around Rome involving the Italian army, the failing Bronco is targeted by a discharge from the beings' flying saucer which departs into space, leaving him as only a pile of rags, molten metal, and a souvenir of St Peter's Basilica that Marina had bought him.

Breaking the fourth wall, one of the officials urges the audience to be vigilant, explaining that other beings like Bronco are lurking out there, equally monstrous and eager to take over the Earth.

== Cast ==
- Michel Lemoine as Bronco / Robert Landersen
- Maria Pia Luzi as Marina Ferri
- Jany Clair as Audrey Bradbury
- Marco Guglielmi as Capt. Carboni
- Piero Palermini as Ufficiale italiano
- Jacopo Tecchi as Prof. Giorgio Borri
- Otello Toso as Major Michelotti
- Peter Dane as Funzianario ONU
