= Jerry van Rooyen =

Dutch jazz trumpeter and bandleader (1928–2009)

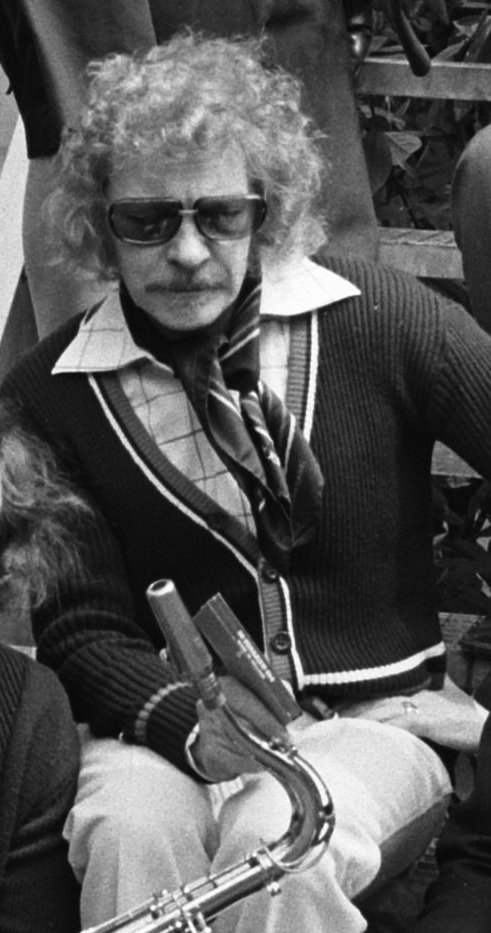
Jerry van Rooyen (1975)

Jerry van Rooyen (31 December 1928 in The Hague – 14 September 2009 in Goor) was a Dutch trumpeter, conductor, and composer. His works have appeared in films such as Free Enterprise and the British television series Spaced.

== Biography ==
Born Gerard Gijsbertus Jacobus van Rooijen, he studied trumpet at the Royal Conservatory of The Hague, graduating in 1950. While an exchange student in New York, he became enamored with American jazz, and (along with brother Ack) became a trailblazer for modern jazz in his home country of the Netherlands.

In his long musical career, Van Rooyen led various big bands in Paris, Berlin, Cologne (WDR Big Band) and Hilversum (Metropole Orchestra). He also wrote many arrangements and compositions for jazz orchestras, and in 1972, he was one of the three composers for the opening music of the Olympic Games in Munich.
