= Michel Lemoine =

French actor & director (1922–2013)

- Born: 30 September 1922; Pantin, Seine-Saint-Denis, France
- Died: 27 July 2013 (aged 90); Vinon, Cher, France
- Occupations: Actor, Director
- Years active: 1948 – 1997 (film)

Michel Lemoine (1922–2013) was a French actor and film director.

== Selected filmography ==
=== Actor ===
- After Love (1948)
- Julie de Carneilhan (1950)
- The Treasure of Cantenac (1950)
- The Adventurers of the Air (1950)
- The Crossroads (1951)
- Open Letter (1953)
- Lord Rogue (1955)
- The Prisoner of the Iron Mask (1962)
- Planets Against Us (1962)
- Hercules vs. Moloch (1963)
- The Bread Peddler (1963)
- The Road to Fort Alamo (1964)
- Mission to Caracas (1965)
- The Lost Woman (1966)
- Two Undercover Angels (1969) as Morpho

== Bibliography ==
- Senn, Bryan. The Most Dangerous Cinema: People Hunting People on Film. McFarland, 2013.
