= Nachi Nozawa =

Japanese actor (1938–2010)

- 野沢 那智
- Born: Yasutomo Nozawa; January 13, 1938; Tokyo, Japan
- Died: October 30, 2010 (aged 72); Tokyo, Japan
- Occupations: Actor; voice actor; narrator; theatre director
- Years active: 1950–2010
- Agent: Office PAC
- Height: 167 cm (5 ft 6 in)

Nachi Nozawa (野沢 那智, Nozawa Nachi; January 13, 1938 – October 30, 2010) was a Japanese actor, voice actor, narrator, and theatre director from Tokyo. He was affiliated with Office PAC at the time of his death. His real name was Yasutomo Nozawa (野沢 那智, Nozawa Yasutomo). Nozawa was the official dub-over artist of Al Pacino and Alain Delon, and also dubbed the roles of Giuliano Gemma, Robert Redford, Bruce Willis, Dustin Hoffman, Christopher Walken, David McCallum, Don Johnson, Willem Dafoe, and James Woods. In the animation field, He was known as his roles in Cobra (as Cobra), Dororo (as Hyakkimaru), Gokū no Daibōken (as Sanzo), Sakura Wars series (as Oni-Ou), and Hellsing (as Alexander Anderson).

On October 30, 2010, Nozawa died at a Tokyo hospital of lung cancer. He was 72 years old at the time of his death. A year after his death, he was honored with a Special Merit Award in the 5th Seiyu Awards.

== Filmography ==
=== Television animation ===
- Astro Boy (1963) (Future)
- Lupin the Third: Pilot Film (1969) (Arsène Lupin III)
- Dororo (1969) (Hyakkimaru)
- Aim for the Ace! (1978) (Jin Munakata)
- The Rose of Versailles (1979) (Hans Axel von Fersen)
- Astro Boy (1980) (Black Jack)
- Kyoufu Densetsu Kaiki! Frankenstein (1981) (Victor Frankenstein)
- Space Adventure Cobra (1982) (Cobra)
- Glass Mask (1984) (Masumi Hayami)
- Lensman (1984) (Worsel)
- Mobile Fighter G Gundam (1994) (Sai Pairon)
- Reign: The Conqueror (1999) (Aristotle)
- Sakura Wars (2000) (Oni-ou, Kazuma Shingūji)
- Hellsing (2001) (Father Alexander Anderson)
- Mao Dante (Satan)
- Monkey Typhoon (2002) (Ryutaro Demon)
- Ragnarok the Animation (2004) (Zephyrus)
- Black Jack (2005) (Biwamaru)
- Monster (2005) (Franz Bonaparta)
- Pokémon Advanced Generation (2006) (Ukon)
- Devil May Cry (2007) (Sid)
- Kekkaishi (2007) (Heisuke Matsudo)
- MapleStory (2007) (Zakteman)

=== OVA ===
- Lupin III: Pilot Film (1969) (Arsène Lupin III)
- Aim for the Ace! 2 (1988) (Jin Munakata)
- Aim for the Ace! Final Stage (1989) (Jin Munakata)
- Legend of the Galactic Heroes: Side Stories (1998) (Herman Von Lüneburg)
- Lupin III: Return of the Magician (2002) (Pycal)
- Macross Zero (2002) (Dr. Hasford)
- Last Order: Final Fantasy VII (2005) (Professor Hojo)
- Cobra the Animation (2009) (Cobra)

=== Theatrical animation ===
- Cleopatra (1970) (Octavian)
- Aim for the Ace! (1979) (Jin Munakata)
- Be Forever Yamato (1980) (Alphon)
- Dr. Slump and Arale-chan: Hoyoyo, Great Round-the-World Race (1983) (Dr. Mashirito)
- Dragon Ball: Sleeping Princess in Devil's Castle (1987) (Lucifer)
- Crayon Shin-chan: Action Kamen vs Leotard Devil (1993) (Leotard Devil)
- Lupin III: Dead or Alive (1996) (Crisis)
- One Piece (2000) (Woonan)
- Reign: The Conqueror (2000) (Aristotle)
- Naruto the Movie 2: Great Clash! The Illusionary Ruins at the Depths of the Earth (2005) (Kahiko)

=== Video games ===
Year	Title	Role	Console	Source
1998	Sakura Wars 2: Thou Shalt Not Die	Oni-Ou	Sega Saturn, Dreamcast, Microsoft Windows, PlayStation Portable	
2000	Tatsunoko Fight	Rosraisen, Andro Umeda	PlayStation	
2005	Cobra the Arcade	Cobra	Arcade	
2006	Dirge of Cerberus: Final Fantasy VII	Professor Hojo	PlayStation 2	
2006	Everybody's Tennis	Ryu	PlayStation 2	
2007	Kingdom Hearts Re:Chain of Memories	Vexen	PlayStation 2	
2007	Crisis Core: Final Fantasy VII	Professor Hojo	PlayStation Portable	
2009	Kingdom Hearts 358/2 Days	Vexen	Nintendo DS	
2010	Kingdom Hearts Birth by Sleep	Even	PlayStation Portable	

=== Dubbing ===
==== Live-action ====
- Alain Delon
  - Faibles Femmes (Julien Fenal)
  - Purple Noon (Tom Ripley) (1972 Fuji TV, 1984 TV Asahi and 2008 TV Tokyo editions)
  - Les Amours célèbres (Prince Albert)
  - Any Number Can Win (1972 TV Tokyo and 1975 TV Asahi editions) (Francis Verlot)
  - Le Diable et les Dix Commandements (Pierre Messager)
  - Joy House (Marc)
  - La Tulipe noire (Julien de Saint Preux)
  - Once a Thief (Eddie Pedak)
  - Texas Across the River (1974 TV Asahi edition) (Don Andrea Baldazar)
  - Diabolically Yours (Pierre)
  - Le Samouraï (Jef Costello)
  - Les aventuriers (Manu)
  - Adieu l'ami (1975 Fuji TV edition) (Dino Barran)
  - Jeff (Laurent)
  - La Piscine (Jean-Paul)
  - Le clan des siciliens (Roger Sartet)
  - Borsalino (1975 Fuji TV and 1983 TV Asahi edition) (Roch Siffredi)
  - Doucement les basses (Simon)
  - Red Sun (Gauche)
  - The Assassination of Trotsky (Frank Jackson)
  - Indian Summer (Daniele Dominici)
  - Un flic (Commissaire Edouard Coleman)
  - Deux hommes dans la ville (Gino Strabliggi)
  - Scorpio (Scorpio)
  - Tony Arzenta (Tony Arzenta)
  - Traitement de choc (Dr. Devilers)
  - Borsalino & Co. (Roch Siffredi)
  - Flic Story (Roger Borniche)
  - Zorro (Diego de la Vega/Zorro)
  - Comme un boomerang (Jacques Batkin)
  - Death of a Corrupt Man (Xavier 'Xav' Maréchal)
  - Le Gang (Robert)
  - The Concorde... Airport '79 (1982 TV Asahi edition) (Capt. Paul Metrand)
  - Trois hommes à abattre (Michel Gerfaut)
  - Le Choc (Martin Terrier / Christian)
  - Parole de flic (Daniel Pratt)
  - Let Sleeping Cops Lie (Eugéne Grindel)
  - The Return of Casanova (Casanova)
  - Une chance sur deux (Julien Vignal)
  - Fabio Montale (Fabio Montale)
- Giuliano Gemma
  - My Son, the Hero (Crios)
  - Blood for a Silver Dollar (1974 TBS edition) (Gary O'Hara)
  - A Pistol for Ringo (1975 TBS edition) (Ringo)
  - The Return of Ringo (1984 TV Tokyo edition) (Capt. Montgomery Brown)
  - Adiós gringo (1973 Fuji TV edition) (Brent Landers)
  - Arizona Colt (1971 NET and 1975 TBS edition) (Arizona Colt)
  - Fort Yuma Gold (1971 NET and 1975 TBS edition) (Gary Diamond)
  - Day of Anger (1970 NET and 1974 TBS edition) (Scott Mary)
  - Long Days of Vengeance (1970 NET edition) (Ted Barnett)
  - Wanted (1973 Fuji TV and 1981 TV Tokyo edition) (Gary Ryan)
  - The Cats (Jason)
  - A Sky Full of Stars for a Roof (Billy Boy aka Tim Hawkins)
  - The Price of Power (Bill Willer)
  - Sundance and the Kid (Monty Mulligan)
  - Corbari (1977 Fuji TV edition) (Silvio Corbari)
  - Somewhere Beyond Love (Nullo Bronzi)
  - Father of the Godfathers (Vito Gargano)
- Robert Redford
  - Barefoot in the Park (Paul Bratter)
  - Butch Cassidy and the Sundance Kid (The Sundance Kid)
  - Tell Them Willie Boy Is Here (Deputy Sheriff Christopher 'Coop' Cooper)
  - The Candidate (Bill McKay)
  - The Hot Rock (Dortmunder)
  - Three Days of the Condor (Joseph Turner)
  - The Electric Horseman (Norman 'Sonny' Steele)
  - Brubaker (Henry Brubaker)
  - The Natural (1989 TV Asahi edition) (Roy Hobbs)
  - Out of Africa (1989 NTV edition) (Denys Finch Hatton)
  - Havana (Jack Weil)
  - Sneakers (Martin Bishop/Martin Brice)
  - Indecent Proposal (John Gage)
  - Up Close & Personal (Warren Justice)
  - The Last Castle (Lieutenant General Eugene Irwin)
  - Spy Game (Nathan Muir)
  - The Clearing (Wayne Hayes)
- Al Pacino
  - The Godfather (1976 NTV edition) (Michael Corleone)
  - Serpico (1977 TV Asahi and Blu-ray edition) (Frank Serpico)
  - The Godfather Part II (1980 NTV edition) (Michael Corleone)
  - Dog Day Afternoon (1979 Fuji TV and Blu-ray edition) (Sonny Wortzik)
  - ...And Justice for All (NTV edition) (Arthur Kirkland)
  - Glengarry Glen Ross (VHS edition) (Ricky Roma)
  - Sea of Love (2001 TV Tokyo edition) (Detective Frank Keller)
  - The Godfather Part III (VHS and DVD and 1994 Fuji TV editions) (Michael Corleone)
  - Scent of a Woman (VHS, DVD and Blu-ray edition) (Lieutenant Colonel Frank Slade)
  - Carlito's Way (VHS, DVD and Blu-ray edition) (Carlito Brigante)
  - City Hall (VHS, DVD edition) (Mayor John Pappas)
  - Donnie Brasco (Pony DVD and Sony DVD edition) (Benjamin "Lefty" Ruggiero)
  - Insomnia (2006 TV Tokyo edition) (Detective Will Dormer)
  - Gigli (DVD edition) (Starkman)
  - Two for the Money (Walter Abrams)
- Bruce Willis
  - Die Hard (1990 TV Asahi edition) (John McClane)
  - Die Hard 2 (1994 TV Asahi edition) (John McClane)
  - Hudson Hawk (1997 NTV edition) (Eddie Hawkins/Hudson Hawk)
  - The Last Boy Scout (1999 TV Asahi edition) (Joe Cornelius Hallenbeck)
  - Striking Distance (1999 TV Asahi edition) (Sergeant Tom Hardy)
  - Color of Night (Dr. Bill Capa)
  - Die Hard with a Vengeance (1999 TV Asahi edition) (John McClane)
  - Last Man Standing (1998 NTV edition) (John Smith)
  - The Fifth Element (2002 TV Asahi edition) (Korben Dallas)
  - The Jackal (2000 NTV edition) (The Jackal)
  - Mercury Rising (2001 TV Asahi edition) (Special Agent Art Jeffries)
  - Breakfast of Champions (Dwayne Hoover)
  - Unbreakable (2005 TV Tokyo edition) (David Dunn)
  - 16 Blocks (2009 TV Asahi edition) (Det. Jack Mosley)
  - Live Free or Die Hard (Theatrical edition) (John McClane)
- Dustin Hoffman
  - The Graduate (Broadcasting inflight version) (Benjamin Braddock)
  - Midnight Cowboy (1983 TBS edition) (Enrico Salvatore "Ratso" Rizzo)
  - Alfredo, Alfredo (1978 NTV edition) (Alfredo Sbisà)
  - Lenny (1981 TBS edition) (Lenny Bruce)
  - All the President's Men (1980 TBS edition) (Carl Bernstein)
  - Marathon Man (1980 TV Asahi edition) (Thomas "Babe" Levy)
  - Tootsie (Broadcasting inflight version) (Michael Dorsey/Dorothy Michaels)
  - Rain Man (VHS and DVD edition) (Raymond Babbitt)
  - Hero (1997 NTV edition) (Bernard "Bernie" LaPlante)
  - Outbreak (VHS and DVD edition) (Colonel Sam Daniels)
  - Confidence (Winston "The King" King)
- Christopher Walken
  - The Dogs of War (1987 TV Asahi edition) (James Shannon)
  - The Dead Zone (1989 TV Asahi edition) (Johnny Smith)
  - A View to a Kill (1991 TBS edition) (Max Zorin)
  - Batman Returns (1994 TV Asahi edition) (Max Shreck)
  - True Romance (1999 TV Tokyo edition) (Vincenzo Coccotti)
  - The Funeral (VHS and DVD edition) (Raimundo "Ray" Tempio)
  - Mousehunt (TBS edition) (Caesar)
  - The Country Bears (Reed Thimple)
- David McCallum
  - Perry Mason (Phillipe Bertain)
  - The Man from U.N.C.L.E. (Illya Kuryakin)
  - Sol Madrid (Sol Madrid)
  - Mosquito Squadron (TBS edition) (Squadron Leader Quint Monroe, RCAF)
  - Hauser's Memory (TV Tokyo edition) (Hillel Mondoro)
  - Colditz (Simon Carter)
  - The Six Million Dollar Man (Alexi Kaslov)
  - The Invisible Man (Fuji TV edition) (Daniel Westin)
- Troy Donahue
  - A Summer Place (1968 TV Asahi edition) (Johnny Hunter)
  - Parrish (Parrish McLean)
  - Susan Slade (Hoyt Brecker)
  - Rome Adventure (1969 TV Asahi edition) (Don Porter)
  - A Distant Trumpet (2nd Lt. Matthew 'Matt' Hazard)
- James Woods
  - Once Upon a Time in America (1988 TV Asahi edition) (Maximilian 'Max' Bercovicz)
  - Cop (1989 TV Asahi edition) (Lloyd Hopkins)
  - The Hard Way (1996 TV Asahi edition) (Detective Lt. John Moss, NYPD)
  - Vampires (2002 TV Tokyo edition) (Jack Crow)
- Robert De Niro
  - New York, New York (1982 TBS edition) (Jimmy Doyle)
  - Goodfellas (Jimmy Conway)
  - Awakenings (1998 NTV edition) (Leonard Lowe)
  - The Score (Nick Wells)
- Willem Dafoe
  - Mississippi Burning (1992 TV Asahi edition) (Agent Alan Ward)
  - Clear and Present Danger (1997 TV Asahi edition) (John Clark)
  - The English Patient (VHS and DVD edition) (Caravaggio)
  - American Psycho (VHS and DVD edition) (Detective Donald Kimball)
- Clint Eastwood
  - In the Line of Fire (1996 TV Asahi edition) (Agent Frank Horrigan)
  - Absolute Power (2000 TV Asahi edition) (Luther Whitney)
  - True Crime (2003 NTV edition) (Steve Everett)
  - Space Cowboys (2004 NTV edition) (Colonel Frank Corvin)
- Anthony Perkins
  - The Black Hole (1984 Fuji TV edition) (Dr. Alex Durant)
  - North Sea Hijack (1984 Fuji TV and 1988 TV Asahi editions) (Kramer)
  - Crimes of Passion (1990 TV Asahi edition) (Reverend Peter Shayne)
- Bill Nighy
  - Love Actually (Billy Mack)
  - Shaun of the Dead (Phillip)
  - Hot Fuzz (Ch. Insp. Kenneth)
- James Dean
  - East of Eden (1982 TV Asahi edition) (Caleb Trask)
  - Giant (1974 NET and 1983 TBS editions) (Jett Rink)
- Warren Beatty
  - Bonnie and Clyde (Clyde Barrow)
  - Heaven Can Wait (Fuji TV and TV Asahi editions) (Joe Pendleton)
- Michael Sarrazin
  - Eye of the Cat (Wylie)
  - The Peacekeeper (VHS edition) (Lieutenant Colonel Douglas Murphy)
- Jeffrey Hunter
  - The Searchers (1968 and 1973 NET editions) (Martin Pawley)
  - The Proud Ones (1968 TBS edition) (Thad Anderson)
- Peter Weller
  - The Adventures of Buckaroo Banzai Across the 8th Dimension (Buckaroo Banzai)
  - Shakedown (TV Tokyo edition) (Roland Dalton)
- Addicted to Love (Anton (Tchéky Karyo))
- Amélie (Narrator (André Dussollier))
- Basquiat (Andy Warhol (David Bowie))
- The 'Burbs (Lt. Mark Rumsfield (Bruce Dern))
- Constantine (2008 TV Asahi edition) (Lucifer Morningstar (Peter Stormare))
- Das Boot (1983 Fuji TV edition) (Leutnant Werner (Herbert Grönemeyer))
- Dumb and Dumber (Harry Dunne (Jeff Daniels))
- The Great Escape (2000 TV Tokyo edition) (Group Captain Ramsey (James Donald))
- Hideaway (Hutch (Jeff Goldblum))
- Miller's Crossing (Tom Reagan (Gabriel Byrne))
- Nash Bridges (Nash Bridges (Don Johnson))
- Seven (John Doe (Kevin Spacey))
- Sophie's Choice (1988 NTV edition) (Nathan Landau (Kevin Kline))
- Speed (1998 TV Asahi edition) (Howard Payne (Dennis Hopper))
- Star Wars Episode IV: A New Hope (C-3PO)
- The Empire Strikes Back (C-3PO)
- Return of the Jedi (C-3PO)
- The Towering Inferno (1979 Fuji TV edition) (Roger Simmons (Richard Chamberlain))

==== Animation ====
- Chicken Little (Turkey Lurkey)
- Peanuts series (Linus Van Pelt)
- Tom and Jerry: The Fast and the Furry (Grammy)
- Wacky Races (Narrator)

==== Live Action TV ====
- The Muppet Show – Dr. Bunsen Honeydew

== Acting director and teacher ==
In 1963, Nozawa formed the Baraza theater troupe.

=== Alumnus ===
- Keiko Toda
- Gara Takashima
- Tesshō Genda
- Hirotaka Suzuoki
- Kinryū Arimoto
- Keiichi Nanba
- Yukimasa Kishino
- Yōko Teppōzuka
- Jun Hazumi
- Norio Imamura
- Hiroko Emori
- Unshō Ishizuka
- Hiroshi Takemura
- Kiyonobu Suzuki
- Kyousei Tsukui
- Hidetoshi Nakamura
- Motomu Azaki
- Tomie Kataoka
