= Tex and the Lord of the Deep =

1985 film

- Film poster
- Directed by: Duccio Tessari
- Screenplay by: Duccio Tessari; Marcello Coscia; Gianfranco Clerici; Sergio Bonelli
- Story by: Gian Luigi Bonelli
- Starring: Giuliano Gemma; William Berger; Carlo Mucari; Peter Berling
- Cinematography: Pietro Morbidelli
- Edited by: Lidia Bordi; Mirella Mencio
- Music by: Gianni Ferrio
- Production company: Rai - Radiotelevisione Italiana
- Distributed by: SACIS
- Release date: 1985 (Italy)
- Running time: 104 minutes
- Country: Italy
- Language: Italian

Tex and the Lord of the Deep (Italian: Tex e il signore degli abissi) is a 1985 Western film co-written and directed by Duccio Tessari and starring Giuliano Gemma and William Berger. The film is an adaptation of the Tex comic series that were popular in Italy. Previously attempted to be made into a production in the late 1960s and early 1970s, the film was eventually made by Tessari who adapted the film from the comics originally to be a pilot for a television series.

== Production ==
Tex Willer was created in 1948 in Italy and became one of the country's most popular and long-lived comic book characters. Attempts to adapt the Tex comic series to film appeared as early as the late 1960s. These included Sergio Bonelli working on an adaptation with Charlton Heston (as Tex) and Jack Palance (as Kit) being considered for the roles. Bonelli approached Tonino Valerii and Enzo G. Castellari to approach the character. Valerii recalled being approached by Gian Luigi Bonelli in the early 1970s. Valerii liked the idea but found that Bonelli wanted to make a film where he would personally handle the costumes and changed the original story which never got into production.

In the early 1980s, Duccio Tessari took on the project that was initially conceived as a pilot for a television series produced by RAI, Italy's national public broadcasting company. Giuliano Gemma was cast as Tex who had worked with Tessari on several films in the past, including A Pistol for Ringo, My Son, the Hero, Kiss Kiss...Bang Bang and The Cats. Tessari and his screenwriters focused on three stories from the Tex comics with fantastic undertones. These included El Morisco, Sierra Encantada and Il signore dell'abisso which were written by Bonelli and drawn by Guglielmo Letteri.

Filming took place between May and June 1985 in Italy and Spain.

== Release and reception ==
Tex and the Lord of the Deep was released theatrically in Italy in 1985. Italian film historian and critic Roberto Curti wrote that the film was "ravaged" by critics and had disappointing box office returns.

Giuliano Gemma spoke negatively about the film after its release, stating that the idea of making the film was good and that he was "delighted to accept it, but I think that, first of all, they made a mistake by choosing to adapt that story, Il signore dell'abisso, because there are such better ones in the series and [several] less difficult to turn into a film."

The planned television series of the film was never made.

== See also ==
- List of films based on comics
- List of Italian films of 1985
