= Helmut Berger =

Austrian actor (1944–2023)

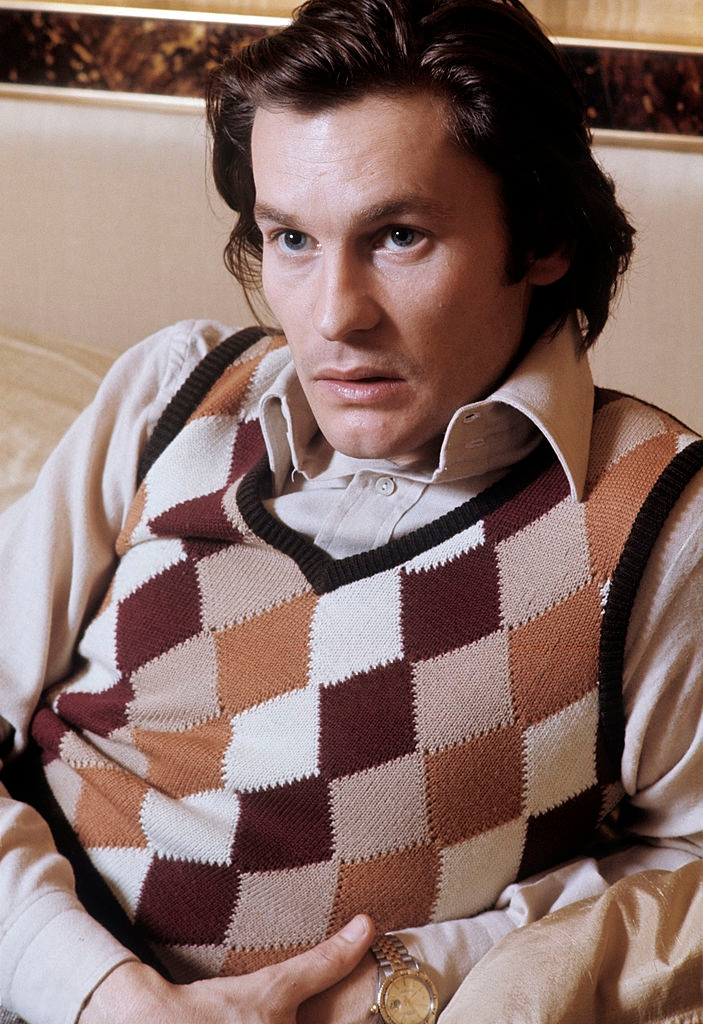
- Berger at his home in Rome in 1972
- Born: Helmut Steinberger; 29 May 1944; Bad Ischl, Nazi Germany
- Died: 18 May 2023 (aged 78); Salzburg, Austria
- Education: Università per Stranieri di Perugia
- Occupation: Actor
- Years active: 1964–2019
- Spouse: Francesca Guidato (m. 1994; sep. 2010)
- Partner: Luchino Visconti (1964–1976)

Helmut Berger (German pronunciation: [ˈhɛlmuːt ˈbɛʁɡɐ]; né Steinberger; 29 May 1944 – 18 May 2023) was an Austrian actor, known for his portrayal of narcissistic and sexually ambiguous characters. He was one of the stars of European cinema in the late 1960s and 1970s, and is regarded as a sex symbol and pop icon of that period.

He is most famous for his work with Luchino Visconti, particularly in his performance as King Ludwig II of Bavaria in Ludwig, for which he received a special David di Donatello award, and his performance in The Damned, for which he was nominated for a Golden Globe Award.

== Early life and education ==
Berger was born in Bad Ischl, Austria (then part of Nazi Germany), into a family of hoteliers. After receiving his Matura, Berger trained and worked in this field, though he had no interest in gastronomy or the hospitality industry. At age eighteen, he moved to London where he did odd jobs while taking acting classes. After studying languages at the Università per Stranieri di Perugia in Italy, Berger moved to Rome.

== Career ==
=== 1964 to 1976 ===
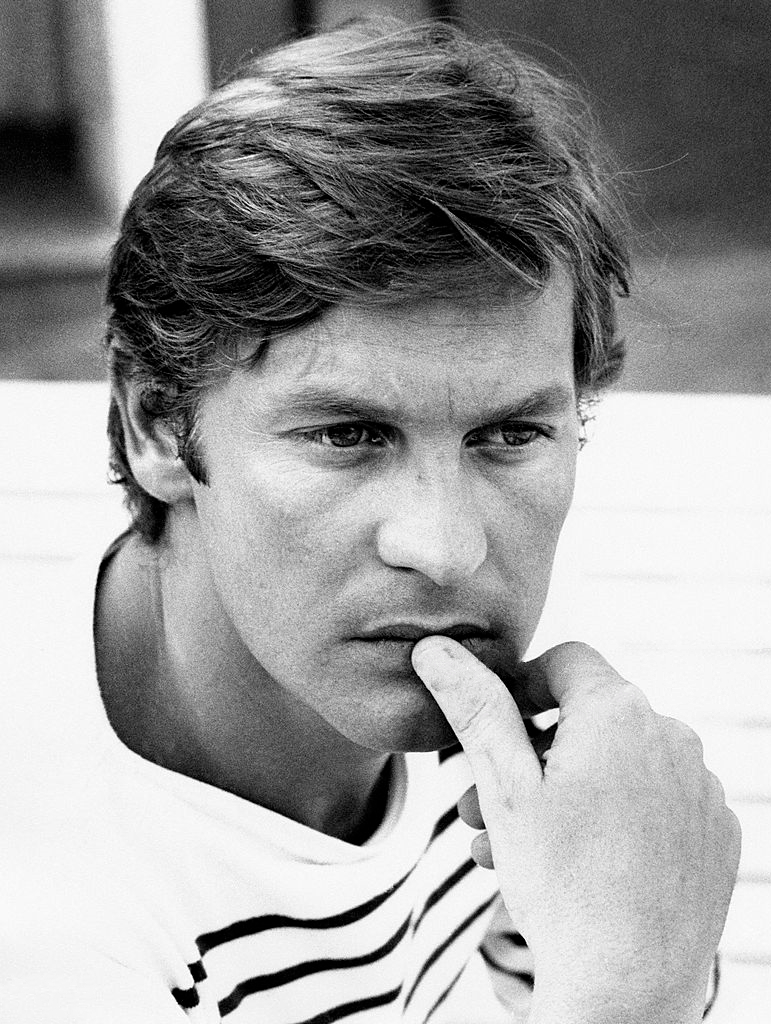
Berger in 1973

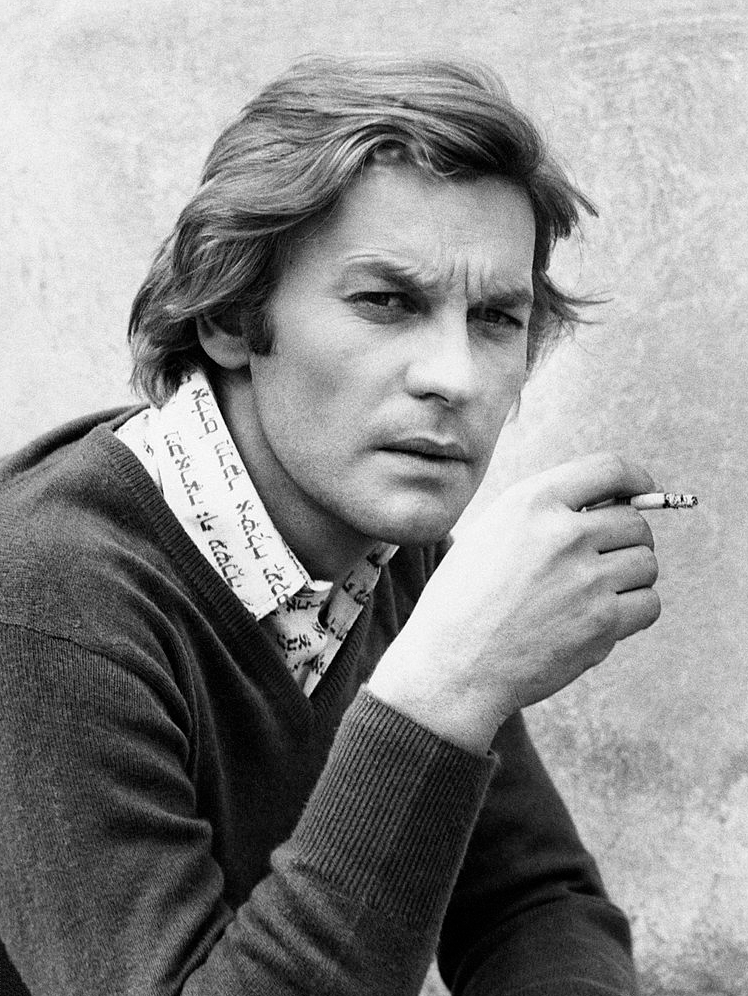
Berger at his home in Rome in 1974

He met the film director Luchino Visconti in 1964. Visconti gave him his first acting role in the film Le streghe (The Witches, 1967) (in the episode "La Strega Bruciata Viva"). He gained international prominence as Martin von Essenbeck in Visconti's The Damned (1969). In that film, in what is perhaps his best-known scene, he pretends to be Marlene Dietrich as she appeared in the film The Blue Angel (1930). He then performed the title role in the Oscar Wilde adaptation Dorian Gray (1970) and a leading role in the Oscar-winning Italian drama film The Garden of the Finzi-Continis (1970). In Visconti's Ludwig (1972), Berger portrays Ludwig II of Bavaria from his youth to his dissolute final years. Romy Schneider starred alongside him. This performance earned him a David di Donatello award. In 1974, Berger starred with Burt Lancaster in Visconti's Conversation Piece. The story of Conversation Piece is often considered an allegory of the personal relationship between Berger and Visconti. On several occasions Berger mentioned this film as his favorite.

He then played leading roles in such international productions as Ash Wednesday (1973) alongside Elizabeth Taylor and Henry Fonda and The Romantic Englishwoman (1975) alongside Michael Caine and Glenda Jackson. He also appeared in Tinto Brass's controversial film Salon Kitty with Ingrid Thulin in 1976. Well-known photographers including Helmut Newton, Mary Ellen Mark, and David Bailey published a series of pictures of him. Andy Warhol made Polaroids of him and produced serigraphs. Berger was also, in 1970, alongside his girlfriend Marisa Berenson, the first man photographed for the cover of Vogue.

=== 1976 to 1999 ===
The death of Luchino Visconti in 1976 plunged him into a personal crisis. Exactly one year after Visconti died, Berger tried to commit suicide but was found in time to be saved. Drug and alcohol abuse began to shadow his acting career. In 1980 Berger was cast by Claude Chabrol as Fantômas before he went to the United States to work in television in the role of Peter De Vilbis in nine episodes (1983–1984) of the U.S. prime time soap opera Dynasty, which he said he did only for money. He later said he was "crying on the way to the set but laughing on the way to the bank". This was his last appearance in a long-running television series. He continued working in the U.S. on various projects, most notably starring in Code Name: Emerald in 1985. In Europe, he acted in the TV-miniseries The Betrothed in 1989.

In 1990, Berger appeared in The Godfather Part III as corrupt banker Frederick Keinszig. He later appeared in the music video of Madonna's song "Erotica" in 1992 and appeared in Madonna's book Sex. In 1993, Berger reprised his role as King Ludwig II in the critically acclaimed film Ludwig 1881. Throughout the second half of the 1990s, he concentrated mainly on European productions, acting in films directed by Christoph Schlingensief, Yves Boisset, and many others.

In 1997, Quentin Tarantino included some archival footage of the film Beast with a Gun in his film Jackie Brown and thanked Berger in the closing credits for his performance.

=== 2000s to 2023 ===
From the early 2000s to 2009, Berger largely withdrew from the acting world, moving to Salzburg to care for his mother, who died in 2009. For the documentary film Helmut Berger: My Life, directed by Cordula Kablitz-Post, Berger recounted his life with Visconti in 2006; he visited Rome and Visconti’s former Villa La Colombaia, Ischia and reflected candidly on his life up to that point.

Berger then returned to acting in bigger production films. In 2012, Schwarzkopf & Schwarzkopf Verlag published Helmut Berger – A Life in Pictures, a coffee table book about his life, featuring many previously unreleased photographs plus essays in German, English, Italian, and French. The book was well received by the reviewers.

In the thriller film Iron Cross (2009), Berger played Shrager, an aging character believed to be an old SS commander responsible for murdering Jews during World War II. In the early 2010s, Berger starred in two films directed by Peter Kern, Blutsfreundschaft (shown at the 60th Berlin International Film Festival (2010)) and Mörderschwestern (2011). In 2014, Berger appeared in Saint Laurent as the older Yves Saint Laurent for which he was "celebrated" at the Cannes Film Festival. The short film Art!, in which Berger had a starring role, had its world premiere at the Paris Independent Film Festival 2015.

In 2015, Austrian filmmaker Andreas Horvath released a feature-length documentary about Berger called Helmut Berger, Actor. The film premiered at the Venice Film Festival. In the magazine Artforum, American film director John Waters chose Helmut Berger, Actor as the 'Best Motion Picture of the year 2015'. Berger later filed a lawsuit against Horvath.

On 22 February 2018, the premiere of Albert Serra's play, Liberté, starring Berger and Ingrid Caven was performed at the Volksbühne theatre in Berlin. It was the first stage role in Berger's career. In 2019, another documentary film Helmut Berger, meine Mutter und ich was released, dealing with his personality and an attempted comeback.

After suffering several bouts of pneumonia, Berger announced his retirement from acting in November 2019 and stated that he wanted to spend his remaining years away from the public eye.

== Personal life ==
Berger was openly bisexual. He was in relationships with his director and mentor Luchino Visconti and actress Marisa Berenson. Berger married Italian writer and model Francesca Guidato on 19 November 1994. After 2010 they lived separately. Berger lived for many years in Rome, but returned to Salzburg in the 2000s to take care of his elderly mother.

In the late 1960s and 1970s, Berger was seen as the "it boy of the European jet set". According to his 1998 autobiography Ich. Die Autobiographie, the actor's affairs included flings with Rudolf Nureyev, Britt Ekland, Luchino Visconti, Ursula Andress, Nathalie Delon, Tab Hunter, Florinda Bolkan, Linda Blair, Marisa Mell, Anita Pallenberg, Marilù Tolo, Jerry Hall, and both Bianca and Mick Jagger. Miguel Bosé writes about his affair with Berger in his autobiography.

From the 1980s on, Berger's private life was also in the news for his struggles with alcohol and drugs, which sometimes resulted in eccentric and controversial television appearances. In 2013, Berger appeared on Ich bin ein Star – Holt mich hier raus!, the German version of I'm a Celebrity...Get Me Out of Here!. He had to leave for health reasons after only two days.

=== Death ===
Berger died on 18 May 2023, at the age of 78.

== Awards and honours ==
In 1969, Berger was nominated for a Golden Globe Award for his role in The Damned, and in 1973 he won a David di Donatello – the Italian equivalent of an Academy Award – for his performance in Ludwig.

In 2007, he received a special Teddy Award at the 57th Berlin International Film Festival (2007) for his overall professional achievements.

In 2010, Berger received two Prix Lumières at the Lumière Film Festival in Lyon and also the "golden key" of the city.

In 2011, he received a Kristián Award, awarded at the Czech film festival Febiofest "for Contributions to World Cinema".

== Reception ==
Except for Helmut Berger, there are no interesting women today.

— Billy Wilder, referring to Berger's drag performance as Marlene Dietrich's The Blue Angel in The Damned (1969),

I think it's androgyny, whether it's David Bowie or Helmut Berger, that has really really influenced my work more than anything.

— Madonna, interviewed by Vince Aletti in 1999.

I think he's wonderful. A man who says what he thinks.

— Nena, interview about filming her music video "Besser geht's nicht".

He's one of those who leave nobody indifferent.

— Spiegel TV, report about Helmut Berger 1997.

== Filmography ==
(director in parentheses; all films except as noted)

Film
Year	Title	Director	Role	Notes
1967	Le streghe	Luchino Visconti	Young man at Hotel	Segment: "La Strega Bruciata Viva"
1968	The Young Tigers	Antonio Leonviola	Dario	
1969	Sai cosa faceva Stalin alle donne?	Maurizio Liverani	Aldo	
1969	The Damned	Luchino Visconti	Martin Von Essenbeck	
1970	Dorian Gray	Massimo Dallamano	Dorian Gray	
1970	The Garden of the Finzi-Continis	Vittorio De Sica	Alberto	
1971	Un beau monstre	Sergio Gobbi	Alain Revent	
1971	The Bloodstained Butterfly	Duccio Tessari	Giorgio	
1972	La colonna infame	Nelo Risi	Arconati	
1973	Merry-Go-Round	Otto Schenk	Der Junge Herr / The Youngman / Alfred	
1973	Les Voraces	Sergio Gobbi	Kosta	
1973	Ludwig	Luchino Visconti	Ludwig	
1973	Ash Wednesday	Larry Peerce	Erich	
1974	Conversation Piece	Luchino Visconti	Konrad Huebel	
1975	Order to Kill	José G. Maesso	Clyde Hart	
1975	The Romantic Englishwoman	Joseph Losey	Thomas	
1976	Salon Kitty	Tinto Brass	Helmut Wallenberg	
1976	Victory at Entebbe	Marvin Chomsky	Wilfried Böse	
1977	Beast with a Gun	Sergio Grieco	Nanni Vitali	
1977	Paperback	David Bailey		
1978	The Greatest Battle	Umberto Lenzi	Lt. Kurt Zimmer	
1978	The Fifth Commandment	Duccio Tessari	Bernhard Redder	
1980	Eroina	Massimo Pirri	Marco	
1981	Mia moglie è una strega	Castellano & Pipolo	Asmodeo	
1982	Deadly Game	Károly Makk	Boris	
1983	Femmes	Tana Kaleya	Helmut	
1983	Victoria! La gran aventura de un poble	Antoni Ribas	Tinent Rodríguez Haro	
1983	Victoria! 2: El frenesì del 17	Antoni Ribas	Tinent Rodríguez Haro	
1983	Veliki Transport	V. Bulajic	Colonel Glassendorf	
1984	Victoria! 3: La razon y el arrebato	Antoni Ribas	Tinent Rodríguez Haro	
1985	Code Name: Emerald	Jonathan Sanger	Ernst Ritter	
1988	Faceless	Jess Franco	Docteur Flamand	
1988	Act of Revenge	Salvatore Nocita		
1989	La Puritana	Nini Grassia	Carlo Martora-Doctor	
1990	The Godfather Part III	Francis Ford Coppola	Frederick Keinszig	
1992	Adelaide	Lucio Gaudino	Gilas	
1993	Boomtown	Christoph Schrewe	Richard Schwarzer	
1993	Ludwig 1881	F. Dubini / D. Dubini	King Ludwig II	
1995	L'affaire Dreyfuss	Yves Boisset	Schwartzkoppen	
1996	L'ombra del faraone	S. Ben Barka		
1996	Teo	Cinzia TH Torrini	Signor Mastrovito	
1997	The 120 Days of Bottrop	Christoph Schlingensief	Himself	
1997	Last Cut	Marcello Avallone		
1999	Under the Palms	M. Kruishoop	David	
2004	Honey Baby	Mika Kaurismäki	Karl / Hades	
2005	Damals warst du still	R. Matsutani	Fabian Plessen	
2009	Zapping Alien	V. Zeplichal	Jack / 00Y / Georg II	
2009	Blutsfreundschaft	Peter Kern	Gustav Tritzinsky	
2009	Iron Cross	Joshua Newton	Shrager / Vogler	
2011	Mörderschwestern	Peter Kern	Dr. Schleier	
2013	The Devil's Violinist	Bernard Rose	Lord Burghersh	
2014	Saint Laurent	Bertrand Bonello	Yves Saint Laurent in 1989	
2015	Helmut Berger, Actor	Andreas Horvath	Himself	Documentary
2016	Timeless	Alexander Tuschinski	Professor Martin	
2019	Helmut Berger, meine Mutter und ich	Valesca Peters	Himself	Documentary
2019	Freedom	Albert Serra	Baron von Walchern	
2024	Cutting Squares	Alexander Tuschinski	Professor Martin	

=== Partial television credits ===
Year	Title	Role	Notes
1979	Le rose di Danzica	Baron Erich von Lehner	
1980	Fantômas	Fantômas / Nanteuil / Gurn / Valgrand	4 episodes
1983–1984	Dynasty	Peter De Vilbis	9 episodes
1986	Veliki Transport	Colonel Glassendorf	3 episodes
1993	Van Loc: un grand flic de Marseille	Michael Bogner	Episode: "La vegeance"
1993	Boomtown	Richard Schwarzer	TV Movie
2005	Damals warst Du still	Fabian Plessen	TV Movie

== See also ==
- List of Austrian film actors

== Bibliography ==
- Coriando, Paola-Ludovika (March 2006). "La poesia del volto: ritratto di Helmut Berger attore viscontiano". Cineforum, Issue #452.
- Berger, Helmut, with Heuer, Holde: Ich, Die Autobiographie. Ullstein, Berlin 1998, ISBN 978-3-550-06969-7.
- Coriando, Paola-Ludovika: Helmut Berger – Ein Leben in Bildern. Schwarzkopf & Schwarzkopf, Berlin 2012, ISBN 978-3-89602-872-3.
- Berger, Helmut, with Heuer, Holde: Helmut Berger, autoportrait. Seguier, 2015, ISBN 978-2-84049-691-5
