= Safari Express =

- Directed by: Duccio Tessari
- Written by: Bruno Corbucci; Mario Amendola; Duccio Tessari
- Cinematography: Claudio Cirillo
- Music by: Guido & Maurizio De Angelis
- Release date: 1976
- Running time: 93 minutes
- Language: Italian

Safari Express is a 1976 Italian-West German adventure-comedy film directed by Duccio Tessari. It is the sequel of Africa Express. It was filmed in the area of Victoria Falls in Africa.

The film follows two safari guides and business partners who discover a beautiful blonde woman wandering through the African jungle with no memory of her past.

== Cast ==
- Ursula Andress: Miriam
- Giuliano Gemma: John Baxter
- Jack Palance: Van Daalen
- Peter Martell: Howard Spring
- Giuseppe Maffioli: Father Gasperin
- Lorella De Luca: The American Tourist

== See also ==
- List of Italian films of 1976
