= Antonio Casas =

Spanish footballer and actor (1911–1982)

- Born: Antonio Casas Barros; 11 November 1911; A Coruña, Galicia, Spain
- Died: 14 February 1982 (aged 70); Madrid, Spain
- Occupations: Footballer and actor

Antonio Casas Barros (11 November 1911 – 14 February 1982) was a Spanish footballer turned film actor who appeared in film between 1941 and his death in 1982.

Casas originally began as a footballer for Atlético Madrid during two or three seasons, but he got a knee injury and entered film in 1941. He made nearly 170 appearances in film and TV between then and 1982. He appeared in A Pistol for Ringo in 1965 and Sergio Leone's Spaghetti Western The Good, the Bad and the Ugly in 1966. One of his best-known roles was in Luis Buñuel's Tristana.

In the early 1970s he worked in television but returned to film after 1975 until his death.

He died on 14 February 1982 in Madrid at age 70.

== Filmography ==
List of acting performances in film
Year	Title	Role	Notes
1942	Unos pasos de mujer		
1942	Goyescas	Paquiro	
1942	The Wheel of Life	Javier	
1942	Correo de Indias		
1943	A Famous Gentleman		
1944	Deber de esposa	Carlos	
1944	Mi fantástica esposa		
1944	Ana María		
1944	Inês de Castro	Alvaro de castro	
1945	Espronceda		
1946	A New Play	Jorge	
1946	El doncel de la reina		
1947	Fuenteovejuna		
1947	Obsesión	Teniente Bermúdez	
1949	La manigua sin dios		
1949	El santuario no se rinde	Teniente Roda	
1950	El duende y el rey		
1951	Servicio en la mar	Jaime	
1951	The Lioness of Castille	Juan de Padilla	
1951	Cerca del cielo	Comandante Aguado	
1951	Dawn of America	Juan de la Cosa	
1952	Devil's Roundup		
1953	Fuego en la sangre		
1953	Fantasía española		
1953	Flight 971	Giner	
1954	Pasaporte para un ángel (Órdenes secretas)		
1954	La sal de la tierra	Andrés	
1954	Malaga	Aziz	
1954	Tres huchas para Oriente	Policía	
1955	Three are Three		(segment "Una de indios")
1955	Death of a Cyclist	Entrenador	
1955	El guardián del paraíso	Comisario	
1956	El expreso de Andalucía	Inspector	
1956	Manolo, guardia urbano	Jefe del servicio	
1957	Un abrigo a cuadros	Julio	
1957	Faustina	Médico	
1957	Los ángeles del volante	Manazas	
1957	Mensajeros de paz	Enrique	
1958	Heroes del Aire	Asesor	
1958	Muchachas en vacaciones	Dr. Enrique González	
1958	El puente de la paz	Dueño Granja A.S.U.	
1958	Die Sklavenkarawane	Mudir	
1958	The Nightingale in the Mountains	The father	
1958	Habanera		
1959	El redentor		
1959	S.O.S., abuelita		
1959	Der Löwe von Babylon	Dosorza	
1959	The Last Days of Pompeii		
1960	Toro bravo		
1960	Juanito	President Meza	
1960	Ama Rosa	Antonio	
1960	La encrucijada	Andrés	
1960	Bajo el cielo andaluz	Contreras	
1960	Maria, Registered in Bilbao	Luis	
1960	091 Policía al habla	Padre de Teresa	
1960	Peace Never Comes	Pedro	
1960	The Revolt of the Slaves	Terulio	
1961	The Colossus of Rhodes	Phoenician Ambassador	
1961	Hola, muchacho		
1962	Teresa de Jesús		
1962	The Son of Captain Blood	Captain of the 'Negrier'	
1962	The Carpet of Horror	Dr. Shipley	
1962	Accident 703		
1962	Hypnosis	Doctor	
1962	La gran familia	Señor que encuentra a Chencho	
1963	Mathias Sandorf	Zathmar	
1963	Senda torcida		
1963	Chantaje a un torero		
1963	Bochorno	Don Enrique	
1963	The Secret of the Black Widow	Bronsfield	
1963	Un demonio con ángel	Carlos	
1963	Vida de familia	Carlos	
1963	Los muertos no perdonan	Luis Alcaraz	
1963	El camino	Salvador	
1964	Constance aux enfers		
1964	L'autre femme		
1964	Brandy	Sheriff Clymer	
1964	Alféreces provisionales	Doctor Peláez	
1964	Minnesota Clay	Jonathan Mulligan	
1964	El tesoro del castillo		
1964	El señor de La Salle	Fiscal	
1965	Assassination in Rome		Uncredited
1965	Nunca pasa nada	Enrique	
1965	A Pistol for Ringo	Major Clyde	
1965	The Dictator's Guns		
1965	Son of a Gunfighter	Pecos, Ace's Lieutenant	
1965	Crimen de doble filo	Comisario Ignacio Ruiz	
1965	Wild Kurdistan	Scheik Cedar	
1965	Operation Double Cross	Colonel	
1965	The Return of Ringo	Sheriff Carson	
1965	Kingdom of the Silver Lion	Scheik Cedar	
1966	Cuatro dólares de venganza	Colonel Jackson	
1966	Fata Morgana	Luis	
1966	Kiss Kiss...Bang Bang	Professor Padereski	
1966	Nuevo en esta plaza		Uncredited
1966	Nueve cartas a Berta	Isidro	
1966	Sound of Horror	Professor Andre	
1966	The Texican	Frank Brady	
1966	The Big Gundown	Brother Smith & Wesson	
1966	The Good, the Bad and the Ugly	Stevens	
1966	Fantasia 3	Neptuno	(segment "La doncella del mar")
1967	Master Stroke	Colonel Jenkins	
1967	Codo con codo		
1967	Novios 68	Jefe de la casa de publicidad	
1967	Cervantes	Favio	
1967	Face to Face	Leading Citizen of Puerto del Fuego	
1967	15 Scaffolds for a Murderer		
1968	The Magnificent Tony Carrera	Kommissar van Heuven	
1968	They Came to Rob Las Vegas		
1969	Las secretarias	Don José	
1969	Un hombre solo		
1969	Prisionero en la ciudad		
1969	Tarzan in the Golden Grotto		
1969	Kidnapping! Paga o uccidiamo tuo figlio	Un Bandito	
1969	Sundance and the Kid	Barnds	
1969	Me enveneno de azules	Padre de Miguel	
1969	The Price of Power	Mr. Willer	
1969	Pepa Doncel		
1970	Golpe de mano (Explosión)	El Coronel	
1970	Tristana	Don Cosme	
1970	Awkward Hands	Warren	
1970	El último día de la guerra		Uncredited
1970	Churchill's Leopards	La Tulipe	
1970	The Ancines Woods	Abad	
1970	El dinero tiene miedo	Comisario	
1971	Boulevard du Rhum	Wilkinson	
1971	The Legend of Frenchie King		Uncredited
1972	Ben and Charlie	Gambler	Uncredited
1972	Las colocadas		
1972	La casa de las chivas	El Padre	
1972	Pancho Villa	General Goyo	
1973	Flor de santidad	Arcipreste	
1973	Disco rojo	Don Ricardo	
1973	Nadie oyó gritar	Oscar	
1973	…E così divennero i tre supermen del West	Reverend	
1974	El mejor alcalde, el rey	Celio	
1974	La mortaja		
1974	El último proceso en París	Juez	
1975	Metralleta 'Stein'	Jefe superior	
1975	La joven casada	Dr. Iglesias	
1975	Sensualidad	Comisario	
1976	La lozana andaluza	Castruccio	
1976	La promesa		
1976	Call Girl (La vida privada de una señorita bien)	Don Esteban	
1976	Volvoreta	Don Miguel	
1976	La muerte del escorpión	Andrés	
1977	Hasta que el matrimonio nos separe	Diego	
1977	Marcada por los hombres	Pedro	
1977	La violación		
1977	Makarras Conexion	Juez	
1977	Niñas... al salón		
1978	Inquisición		
1978	El último guateque	Emilio	
1978	El hombre que supo amar	Alguacil	
1980	Hijos de papá		
