= Africa Express =

Africa Express may refer to:

- Africa Express (film), a 1975 Italian adventure film
- Africa Express (organization), a UK-based non-profit organization
