= Lorella De Luca =

Italian actress

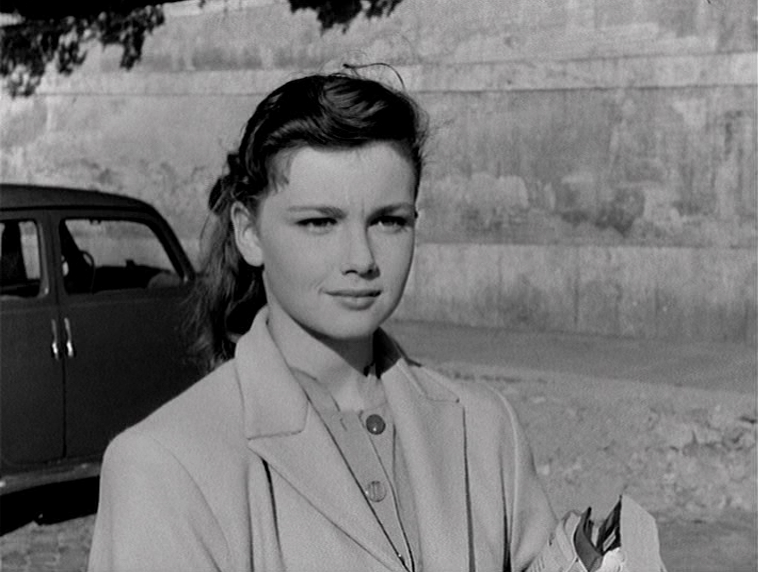
- De Luca in the movie Il bidone (1955)
- Born: 17 September 1940; Florence, Kingdom of Italy
- Died: 9 January 2014 (aged 73); Civitavecchia, Rome, Italy
- Other name: Hally Hammond
- Occupations: Actress; assistant director
- Years active: 1955–1984
- Spouse: Duccio Tessari (m. 1971–1994)
- Children: 2

Lorella De Luca (17 September 1940 – 9 January 2014) was an Italian actress. One of the most recognized ingénues of Italian cinema during the mid-to-late 1950s, she is best known for having played naive young girls in dramas and comedies.

She was born in Florence, Italy, and, following her "discovery" at age 14, made her acting debut in the Federico Fellini film Il bidone (1955). De Luca's breakout role, however, came a year later following her performance in Dino Risi's comedy 'Poor, But Handsome (1956) and continued on in the genre, with appearances in Mario Monicelli films Fathers and Sons (1957) and Doctor and the Healer (1957), as well as in Duccio Tessari's spaghetti Westerns A Pistol for Ringo (1965) and its sequel The Return of Ringo (1965) with Giuliano Gemma.

== Biography ==
Lorella De Luca was born in Florence, Italy on 17 September 1940. "Discovered" at the age of fourteen by a director who followed De Luca home, and convinced her father that she should be in films, she made her feature film debut in Federico Fellini's Il bidone (1955) as Patrizia, the young daughter of middle-aged con man Augusto (Broderick Crawford). She subsequently attended the prestigious "Centro Sperimentale di Cinematografia" (Experimental Cinematography Centre) in Rome, and the following year appeared in what would be her breakout role in Dino Risi's Poor, But Handsome (1956) alongside other young actors Marisa Allasio, Renato Salvatori and Maurizio Arena. The success of the film made De Luca one of the most popular ingenues of Italian cinema; her freshness and grace endeared her to the public.

De Luca was one of several women romantically involved with her Poor, But Handsome co-star Maurizio Arena. She co-starred with Arena in Il principe fusto (1960), a film which he co-wrote, produced and directed. Their relationship created a minor scandal when it was revealed by the Italian media that Arena, after publicly announcing his intention to wed Anna Maria Pierangeli, was also engaged to De Luca.

She specialized in the character of the naive young girl, a kind of an Italian Sandra Dee, and appeared in a series of hit comedies: Fathers and Sons (1957) and The Doctor and the Sorcerer (1957) by Mario Monicelli, the latter starring Vittorio de Sica and Marcello Mastroianni, Sunday Is Always Sunday (1958) by Camillo Mastrocinque, First Love (1958) by Mario Camerini, Gianni Franciolini's romantic comedy Love on the Riviera (1958), and many others. In 1958, De Luca joined Alessandra Panaro and Mario Riva as a show girl in the popular TV quiz show Il Musichiere (The Musician). She also had minor roles in "sword-and-sandal" and "muscleman" films, often being cast as a princess or slave girl, such as Sheba and the Gladiator (1959) and Sign of the Gladiator (1965).

With the beginning of the 1960s, De Luca received more and more roles in commercial films. She had a brief, but memorable, foray into the Spaghetti Western genre. In 1965, under the pseudonym "Hally Hammond", she had supporting roles in A Pistol for Ringo and its sequel, The Return of Ringo, both directed by her future husband Duccio Tessari. De Luca appeared in nine other films directed by her husband, most notably, Una voglia da morire (1965) and Kiss Kiss...Bang Bang (1966), between 1965 and 1978. After 1967, with the birth of their two daughters Federica and Fiorenza Tessari, in addition to her losing interest as a character actor, she accepted only occasional parts during the next decade.

Her last acting roles were in The Fifth Commandment (1978) and the 1984 television miniseries Nata d'amore. She was actively involved in her husband's later career and was first assistant director in his final film There Was a Castle with Forty Dogs (1990). De Luca made one last appearance in Bonus malus (1993) and retired from the film industry after Tessari's death the following year.

== Marriage ==
De Luca starred in a total of nine films directed by Ducio Tessari, whom she married in 1971, in addition to working behind the scenes as an assistant director.

== Death ==
De Luca died on 9 January 2014, aged 73, after a long battle with a brain tumor, which had caused her to lose her vision sometime before her death.

== Filmography ==
As an actress

Year	Title	Role	Notes
1955	Il Bidone	Patrizia	
1956	Roland the Mighty	Alda / Aude	
1957	Poor, But Handsome	Marisa Toccacieli	also known as Poor, But Beautiful
1957	A Tailor's Maid	Marcella Corallo	
1957	Sette canzoni per sette sorelle	Giulietta	
1957	The Mysteries of Paris	Maria, la Cantante	
1957	Doctor and the Healer	Clamide	also known as A Tailor's Maid
1957	Pretty But Poor	Marisa Toccacieli	also known as Poor Girl, Pretty Girl
1957	L'ultima violenza	Lisa Carani	
1957	Gente felice	Gioia	
1957	Dinanzi a noi il cielo	Amichetta di Tom	
1958	Napoli sole mio!	Lorella	
1958	Sunday Is Always Sunday	Maria Luisa Gastaldi	
1958	El hombre del paraguas blanco	Esperanza	
1958	Il bacio del sole	Teresa	
1958	Girls for the Summer	Lina	also known as Love on the Riviera
1958	Tuppe tuppe, Marescià!	Maria Paoletti	
1959	First Love	Francesca	
1959	Sheba and the Gladiator	Bathsheba, the Vestal	
1959	Poor Millionaires	Marisa	
1959	Ciao, ciao bambina!	Proietti, Gloria	
1959	Wild Cats on the Beach	Lisa	
1959	La duchessa di Santa Lucia	Fernanda, la nipote di Carmela	
1959	Quanto sei bella Roma	Lorella	
1959	Agosto, donne mie non vi conosco	Anna Moriconi	
1960	Il principe fusto	Angela	
1960	Caccia al marito	Giulia	
1961	Beauty on the Beach		
1961	Apolytrosis	Eleni	
1962	Charge of the Black Lancers	Samal	
1962	Taras Bulba, the Cossack	Natalia	
1962	La notte dell'innominato		
1963	The Shortest Day	Erede Siciliana	Uncredited
1963	Shéhérazade		
1964	Le fils de Tarass Boulba	Nadia	
1965	Una voglia da morire	Marisa	
1965	A Pistol for Ringo	Miss Ruby	as Hally Hammond
1965	The Return of Ringo	Helen Brown / Hally Fitzgerald	as Hally Hammond
1966	Kiss Kiss...Bang Bang	Frida Kadar	
1967	Per amore... per magia...		
1971	The Bloodstained Butterfly	Marta Clerici	
1974	Tough Guys	Anne Lombardo	
1976	Sexycop		
1978	The Fifth Commandment	Mutter Redder	
1993	Bonus malus	Signora Altoviti	
2009	A Greek Western Tragedy	Herself	Video documentary short

As an assistant director

Year	Title	Role	Notes
1978	Death Occurred Last Night	(assistant director)	
1978	Winged Devils	(assistant director)	
1990	There Was a Castle with Forty Dogs	(first assistant director)	

=== Television ===
Year	Title	Role	Notes
1984	Nata d'amore		TV mini-series
