= Una voglia da morire =

1965 film

- Directed by: Duccio Tessari
- Written by: Enzo Battaglia (story), Lorenzo Gicca Palli (screenplay)
- Cinematography: Carlo Carlini
- Edited by: Franco Fraticelli
- Music by: Giampiero Boneschi
- Release date: 1965
- Country: Italy
- Language: Italian

Una voglia da morire is a 1965 Italian drama film directed by Duccio Tessari.

== Cast ==
- Annie Girardot as Eleonora
- Raf Vallone as Eleonora's Husband
- Régine Ohann as Clara
- Alberto Lionello as Clara's Husband
- Sophie Daumier
- Michel Lemoine
- Carlo Giordana
- Lorella De Luca
- Giuliano Giunti
- Calisto Calisti
- Mario Lanfranchi
