= Girls for the Summer =

Racconti d'estate
- Directed by: Gianni Franciolini
- Written by: Gianni Franciolini; Alberto Moravia; Sergio Amidei; René Barjavel; Ennio Flaiano; Rodolfo Sonego; Alberto Sordi; Edoardo Anton
- Produced by: Mario Cecchi Gori; Franz de Blasi
- Cinematography: Enzo Serafin
- Edited by: Adriana Novelli
- Music by: Piero Piccioni
- Distributed by: Ultra Pictures Corporation (USA)
- Release date: 1958
- Countries: Italy; France
- Language: Italian

Girls for the Summer (Italian: Racconti d'estate or US title: Love on the Riviera) is a 1958 Italian romantic comedy drama film directed by Gianni Franciolini, based on story by Alberto Moravia. The film stars Alberto Sordi, Michèle Morgan, Marcello Mastroianni, Sylva Koscina, Gabriele Ferzetti, Dorian Gray, Franca Marzi, Franco Fabrizi and Jorge Mistral.

It tells the five romantic and funny stories in the Gulf of Tigullio (Liguria, north-western Italy).

== Plot ==
In the Gulf of Tigullio, in a lively summer around the end of the 1950s, various events intertwine, with their respective characters and their most disparate stories. It is here that men and women tormented by the need for money, try to take advantage of situations, at least apparently favorable, to solve their problems, all sharing the same epilogue: failure.

Among these events, that of Aristarco Battistini, a penniless lover and administrator of a famous opera singer, Ada Gallotti, with a far from attractive appearance, unlike the beautiful tourists who animate the life of the Riviera. And it is precisely here that the singer and her boyfriend go to stay to recover from the efforts of the artist's numerous tours.

For Aristarchus, the holiday proceeds in the most total monotony, always and only called to take care of the singer (whose movements are made difficult by her size) and to indulge her whims and needs. The man thus decides to regain his freedom while also securing an economic advantage: the goods of the woman. The lucky occasion that pushes Aristarchus to realize his plan, however, is the meeting, during the holiday, with Jacqueline, a beautiful French tourist and his old flame who on seeing him is fascinated by the belief that he is a rich successful globetrotter.

But doom is lurking and he takes the form of Ada's mother. In fact, just at the moment when Aristarchus and his lawyer friend are about to obtain the singer's signature on the deed of sale of his huge estate in Tuscany, the woman's mother telephones her, and imposes a clause on the contract: Aristarchus will be able to dispose of the well only after marrying Ada. Disappointed and resigned, Aristarchus marries Ada and thus says goodbye to his true "dreams of glory".

Meanwhile, in those same places, another story also takes place, that of Walter, an "arranged" tourist guide, Clara and her daughter Lina. The unemployed and indebted Walter undertakes to tail the wealthy lady with polite manners and a thousand attentions, to win her trust and convince her to grant him a loan. Loan that the young man, totally broke, cannot repay. Lina has understood Walter's plan well and confronts him by telling him not to see her mother anymore in order to avoid bitter disappointments.

The provocative but bored Dorina is perpetually looking for male company, recognizing (or pretending to recognize) in beautiful guys, possibly rich, old acquaintances. After an unfortunate fling with a photo novel actor, she ends up loving a simple lifeguard, mistaken for a yacht owner.

Another story is that of Sandro, Renata's husband and in serious economic difficulties due to the problems in his business as an entrepreneur. Renata is hosted by Commendatore Ferrari for a holiday in Rapallo. But the attention that the rich tycoon turns to his friend Sandro's wife becomes more and more pressing, until poor Renata understands the truth: that she was used by her husband to make Mr. Ferrari condescending and induce him to help him in his economic activity. The decisive reaction of the woman, determined to avenge her shame, however, will not be long in coming.

Marcello Mazzoni is an inspector who is escorting a French detainee to the border, so that she can be tried for theft in Marseille. Mazzoni is however a particular inspector, with an open and spontaneous character to the point of making him appear often clumsy, who does not particularly like his work and the rigid protocols that characterize it. This leads him to take a liking to and socialize with the woman to the point of falling in love with her and thinking about running away with her. However, it will remain only a dream, but there remains the possibility of seeing her again, after a few years, on her release from prison.

== Cast ==
- Alberto Sordi - Aristarco Battistini
- Michèle Morgan - Micheline
- Marcello Mastroianni - Marcello Mazzoni
- Sylva Koscina - Renata Morandi
- Gabriele Ferzetti - Giulio Ferrari
- Dorian Gray - Dorina
- Franca Marzi - Clara
- Lorella De Luca - Lina
- Franco Fabrizi - Sandro Morandi
- Ennio Girolami - Walter (as Enio Girolami)
- Jorge Mistral - Romualdo (as Jeorge Mistral)
- Dany Carrel - Jacqueline
