= The Amusements of Private Life =

- Directed by: Cristina Comencini
- Written by: Gérard Brach; Jackye Fryszman; Cristina Comencini
- Starring: Delphine Forest; Christophe Malavoy; Giancarlo Giannini; Vittorio Gassman
- Cinematography: Fabio Cianchetti
- Edited by: Nino Baragli
- Music by: Fiorenzo Carpi
- Release date: 1990
- Countries: Italy; France
- Language: French

The Amusements of Private Life (Italian: I divertimenti della vita privata, French: Les amusements de la vie privée)) is a 1990 Italian-French comedy film co-written and directed by Cristina Comencini. According to the film critic Paolo Mereghetti, the film is very ambitious and has a careful attention to detail but also has some awkwardness and a confusing plot.

== Cast ==
- Delphine Forest as Mathilde Seurat / Julie Renard
- Christophe Malavoy as Honoré de Dumont
- Giancarlo Giannini as Charles Renard
- Vittorio Gassman as Marquis
- Roberto Infascelli as Jean-Jacques Renard
- Roberto Citran as Belzé
- Natalie Guetta as Nanny
