= Il bidone =

- Theatrical release poster
- Directed by: Federico Fellini
- Screenplay by: Federico Fellini; Ennio Flaiano; Tullio Pinelli
- Produced by: Mario Derecchi
- Starring: Broderick Crawford; Giulietta Masina; Richard Basehart; Franco Fabrizi
- Cinematography: Otello Martelli
- Edited by: Mario Serandrei; Giuseppe Vari
- Music by: Nino Rota
- Production companies: Titanus; Société Générale de Cinématographie
- Distributed by: Titanus Distribuzione
- Release date: 9 September 1955 (Venice Film Festival)
- Running time: 109 minutes
- Country: Italy
- Languages: Italian; English

Il bidone [il biˈdoːne], a.k.a. The Swindle, is a 1955 Italian drama film directed by Federico Fellini starring Broderick Crawford, Richard Basehart and Giulietta Masina.

== Plot ==
In the country outside Rome, a group of swindlers dress up as clerics and con poor farmers out of their savings. Another scam in a shanty town is to pretend they are officials taking deposits for apartments. The proceeds are spent on flashy cars, champagne and nightclubs.

One member of the gang, Carlo – nicknamed Picasso in being an aspiring artist – pretends to his faithful wife Iris that he is a traveling salesman, but she gradually stops believing him. His conscience is pricked and he decides to quit. Another member is Roberto, who finds scamming poor people diverting and has fun spending the loot and going to parties, where he attempts to steal some jewels.The head of the gang, Augusto, meets his teenage daughter Patrizia who he has not seen for years, and his conscience is also awakened. However he is recognized in a cinema with her, arrested and jailed.

When released he joins a new gang along with a sleazy man, Vargas, known as "The Baron". They repeat the clergy scam among peasants. After swindling a large sum out of a farming family in the windy Apennine Mountains, he talks, pretending to be a priest, to their sick teenage daughter. Her plight touches him, and when the gang come to share out the gains he says he gave it all back. A row develops and he is battered to the ground by Vargas and his cronies. Stripping him, the crooks find he has concealed the takings in his clothes. On a barren and rocky hillside, they leave him to a slow death. The next morning Augusto hears a group of peasant women with children passing close by, singing and whistling. His last words are "wait for me" before he dies.

== Cast ==
- Broderick Crawford as Augusto Rocco
- Giulietta Masina as Iris
- Richard Basehart as Carlo
- Franco Fabrizi as Roberto Giorgio
- Sue Ellen Blake as Anna
- Irene Cefaro as Marisa
- Alberto De Amicis as Rinaldo
- Lorella De Luca as Patrizia
- Giacomo Gabrielli as Il Baron Vargas
- Riccardo Garrone as Riccardo
- Xenia Valderi as Luciana

== Production ==
Fellini had intended Humphrey Bogart for the role of Augusto, but, learning of Bogart being ill with cancer, finally chose Broderick Crawford for the part.

== Reception ==
On the occasion of its nine-year delayed US premiere, critic Bosley Crowther gave the film a mixed review, calling it "a cheap crime thriller". He added, "For this film, which is often mentioned in estimations of the master's works, is notable as a false step in his movement toward the development of a type of story material ... But it contains some very strong Fellini phases and accumulations of moods that make it well worth seeing. And it is generally well played ... Broderick Crawford's performance as the swindler is heavy and sodden, with a particular flair for postured histrionics in the swindle scenes."
