= Doctor and the Healer =

1957 film

- Spanish theatrical poster
- Directed by: Mario Monicelli
- Written by: Ennio De Concini; Luigi Emmanuele; Agenore Incrocci; Mario Monicelli; Furio Scarpelli
- Produced by: Guido Giambartolomei
- Starring: Vittorio De Sica; Marcello Mastroianni
- Cinematography: Luciano Trasatti
- Edited by: Otello Colangeli
- Music by: Nino Rota
- Distributed by: Variety Distribution
- Release date: 1957
- Running time: 102 minutes
- Country: Italy
- Language: Italian

Doctor and the Healer (Italian: Il medico e lo stregone) is a 1957 Italian comedy film directed by Mario Monicelli.

== Plot ==
The young Dr. Marchetti relocates to a small mountain village in rural southern Italy. He quickly runs into trouble with Don Antonio Locoratolo, the local quack who prescribes dubious cures and potions to the naïve and superstitious populace. Don Antonio knows that his methods are fraudulent and sees Dr. Marchetti as a threat to his livelihood. Don Antonio convinces the local populace not to get vaccinated against typhoid fever. To convince the population of their continued need for him, Don Antonio arranges for an old man in the village to feign sick for several days and not improve under Dr. Marchetti's treatment, but who is miraculously "cured" during a visit by Don Antonio. Meanwhile, Pasqua, Dr. Marchetti's young assistant, has fallen in love with him, even though he does not notice her. She is given a love potion by Don Antonio's assistant, Scaraffone, but it only causes Dr. Marchetti stomach pains; Dr. Marchetti thinks Don Antonio has tried to poison him.

The mayor's sister, Mafalda, is pining after her fiancé, Corrado, who was last heard from 15 years ago, and is presumed to have been lost fighting in Russia on the Eastern Front. For years, Don Antonio has been using fraudulent fortune-telling techniques to tell her that Corrado is still alive, as she pays well for each session, even though he desires her for himself. She puts an advertisement in the paper to see if anybody has heard from or seen her fiancé. When Don Antonio tells Mafalda that her beloved Corrado is dead, she denounces him to the police as a fraud. The following day, she receives a telegram stating that Corrado is alive and will meet her at the train station. The reunion is not a happy one: Corrado is confused about details of his life, telling her he was captured "by bedouins". He says has been living 40 km away, unhappily married, and asks her for money. She gives him money and tells him to leave, and he boards the next train.

Meanwhile, Dr. Marchetti goes to the police to seek justice over the supposed "poisoning" and Mafalda's denouncement of Don Antonio, but the charges do not stick.

Don Antonio's niece Rosina is in love with a soldier from a poor family. Furious, he locks her in and forbids her from continuing the relationship. Despondent, she takes an overdose of barbiturates, forcing Don Antonio to publicly seek the doctor's help to save his niece's life. The movie ends with Dr. Marchetti administering typhoid vaccines to the local populace, while Don Antonio leaves on a train.

== Cast ==
- Vittorio De Sica - Antonio Locoratolo
- Marcello Mastroianni - Dr. Francesco Marchetti
- Marisa Merlini - Mafalda
- Lorella De Luca - Clamide
- Gabriella Pallotta - Pasqua
- Alberto Sordi - Corrado
- Virgilio Riento - Umberto
- Carlo Taranto - Scaraffone
- Ilaria Occhini - Rosina
- Riccardo Garrone - Sergeant
- Giorgio Cerioni - Galeazzo Pesenti
- Gino Buzzanca - Il sindaco di Pianetta
