= Delphine Forest =

French actress (1966–2020)

- Born: 28 August 1966; Paris, France
- Died: 31 January 2020 (aged 53); Paris, France
- Occupation: Actress
- Years active: 1988–2016

Delphine Forest (28 August 1966 – 31 January 2020) was a French actress. She appeared in more than ten film and TV projects, beginning in 1988 with Bonjour l'angoisse. She died in Paris of cancer, January 31, 2020.

== Filmography ==
Film
Year	Title	Role	Notes
1988	Bonjour l'angoisse	Natacha Michaud	
1989	Boris Godunov	Marina Mnichek	
1990	There Was a Castle with Forty Dogs	Violetta	
1990	The Amusements of Private Life	Mathilde Seurat / Julie Renard	
1990	Europa Europa	Inna Moyseyevna	
1993	Le nombril du monde	Habiba	
1993	Mauvais garçon	Léa	
2002	Le chant de la viande		Short film
2003	Isa	Hélène	Short film

TV
Year	Title	Role	Notes
1988	Marcus Welby, M.D.: A Holiday Affair	Anna Depuy	TV movie
1989	The Betrothed	Lucia Mondella	Miniseries
1996	Mindbender	Sharon	TV movie
1998	Villa vanille	Ariane	TV movie
2006	And Quiet Flows the Don	Aksinia	7 episodes
2011	Section de recherches	Sophie Granjon	1 episode
2016	Crush in Jaipur	Marie	TV movie
