= The Bloodstained Butterfly =

- Directed by: Duccio Tessari
- Written by: Gianfranco Clerici; Duccio Tessari
- Starring: Helmut Berger, Ida Galli
- Cinematography: Carlo Carlini
- Music by: Gianni Ferrio
- Release date: 10 September 1971
- Running time: 95 minutes
- Country: Italy
- Language: Italian

The Bloodstained Butterfly (Italian: Una farfalla con le ali insanguinate) is a 1971 giallo film directed by Duccio Tessari. It starred Helmut Berger and Ida Galli.

== Plot ==
A young French woman named Françoise Pigaut (Carole André) meets a man in a public park in the rain. They get into a violent altercation, so the man gags Françoise before stabbing her to death with a switchblade. She takes a tumble down a hill, where a little girl in a raincoat finds her and rushes to get help.

TV sports host Alessandro Marchi (Giancarlo Sbragia) is witnessed fleeing the scene, and he's arrested and taken to trial. Françoise is suspected to have been groped by Marchi, whose daughter Sarah (Wendy D'Olive) was a friend of hers, when she was meeting a lover in the park. The motive is presented as Françoise threatening to report Marchi, and Marchi killed her in a rage to silence her. Marchi is convicted, and it's revealed his lawyer, Giulio Cordaro (Günther Stoll), deliberately restrained himself from a more aggressive defense to continue his affair with Marchi's wife, Maria (Evelyn Stewart).

Giorgio (Helmut Berger), a young pianist, starts dating Sarah, but he is also distant from his family and buries his disgruntlement in drinking. Their relationship deteriorates the night Giorgio is sexually aggressive with Sarah. A prostitute is found murdered in the same park, the hallmark details bearing similarity to Françoise's murder. As the police don't give much consideration to the similarities, a caller claiming to be the killer taunts the inspector on the case, Berardi (Silvano Tranquilli), saying he'll kill someone else. Shortly after, a third woman is slashed to death in the same park after physically punishing two children she's supervising. Maria comes home to find Giulio attempting to rape Sarah, so she kicks him out of the house. A retrial, introducing Marchi's mistress Marta (Lorelli De Luca), finds Marchi innocent of Françoise's murder, and he's released with his conviction overturned.

The inspector goes to the store where the switchblade were bought, and the owner gives him the killer's identity. A meeting Marchi is brought to in an abandoned building reveals Giorgio was the killer, as well as Françoise's lover. As the police rush to the scene to try and stop them, figuring everything out, Giorgio confesses he only killed the last two women, as he knew Marchi murdered Françoise when Marchi bumped into Giorgio while fleeing the scene. Marchi confesses to Françoise's murder, and Giorgio shoots Marchi. When checking to see if he's dead, Giorgio is stabbed by Marchi. When Marchi tries to flee, Giorgio shoots him dead, dying smiling over his accomplished plan.

== Cast ==
- Helmut Berger as Giorgio
- Giancarlo Sbragia as Alessandro Marchi
- Evelyn Stewart (credited as Ida Galli) as Maria Marchi
- Wendy D'Olive as Sarah Marchi
- Silvano Tranquilli as Inspector Berardi
- Carole André as Françoise Pigaut
- Lorella De Luca as Marta Clerici
- Günther Stoll as Attorney Giulio Cordaro
- Wolfgang Preiss as The Prosecutor
- Dana Ghia as Diamante

== Critical reception ==
AllMovie gave the film a positive review, writing "this beautifully assembled giallo is among the best of its time" and that it features a "genuinely intelligent script, a rarity in a subgenre generally known for flamboyant visuals at the expense of narrative cohesion."
