= Norio Imamura =

Japanese stage actor and voice actor

- Born: Kiyonori Imamura; April 17, 1954 (age 71); Gifu, Gifu Prefecture, Japan
- Other names: Sheneo
- Occupations: Stage actor, voice actor
- Years active: 1970-present

Kiyonori Imamura (今村 清憲, Imamura Kiyonori), better known by his stage name Norio Imamura (いまむら のりお, Imamura Norio) (born April 17, 1954), is a Japanese stage actor and voice actor from Gifu. He is a graduate of the Fine Arts department of Nihon University. Imamura began his career in the musical troupe Musical Company It's Follies [ja] and was coached by Nachi Nozawa.

Imamura tattoos himself as a hobby and has reportedly spent 4 to 5 million yen (the equivalent of $45,000 to $56,000) on tattoos over the course of a decade. From April 26 to June 7, 2010, Imamura posted pictures of his lower body on his blog with the intention of showing that his body had been completely tattooed. Imamura was arrested in July 2010 for posting images that were deemed indecent. This event forced Imamura to step down from his ongoing voice role as Emporio Ivankov in One Piece (the role was subsequently inherited by Mitsuo Iwata). On September 1, Imamura was released following a summary proceeding at the Tokyo Public Prosecutor's Office and was given a fine of 500,000 yen (approximately $6,000).

== Roles ==
=== Television animation ===
- One Piece (Emporio Ivankov (first voice))
- Transformers: Robots in Disguise (Gas Skunk)

=== Dubbing roles ===
- The Birdcage (Video/DVD edition) (Albert Goldman)
- The Next Best Thing
- Wasabi

=== Stage ===
- Chotto Nozo Itemitegoran
- Gotsugōshugi de Gyō Kō
- Charlie's Hengel
- Gotsugōshugi de Gyō Kō, Part 2: Heppiri Koshi de Gyō Kō
- Sammy's Bar Heyōkoso!
- Chotto Nozo Itemitegoran 2008
- Bakumatsu Samurai Densetsu -CHUJI-
- 21-Seiki Chūnen! ~Saishūshō: Wagashi no On?~
