= The Betrothed (miniseries) =

1989 Italian television miniseries

- Italian: I promessi sposi
- Genre: Period drama
- Based on: The Betrothed by Alessandro Manzoni
- Written by: Roberta Mazzoni; Alessandro Manzoni
- Directed by: Salvatore Nocita
- Starring: Danny Quinn; Delphine Forest; Alberto Sordi; Franco Nero; Burt Lancaster; Fernando Rey; Helmut Berger; F. Murray Abraham; Dario Fo; Valentina Cortese; Walter Chiari
- Theme music composer: Ennio Morricone
- Country of origin: Italy
- Original language: Italian
- No. of episodes: 5

Production
- Cinematography: Živko Zalar
- Running time: 450 minutes

Original release
- Network: RAI
- Release: November 12 – December 10, 1989

The Betrothed (Italian: I promessi sposi) is a 1989 Italian television miniseries starring Danny Quinn, Delphine Forest, Alberto Sordi, Burt Lancaster and Franco Nero. It was directed by Salvatore Nocita, based on the 19th-century historical novel of the same name by Alessandro Manzoni.

== Plot ==
Set between 1629 and 1631, the adaptation tells the story of Renzo Tramaglino and Lucia Mondella, Lombard commoners forced to separate and endure a thousand vicissitudes due to the arrogance of the lord Don Rodrigo. However, during their journey they will find various people willing to help them, from Fra Cristoforo to the Innominato (first cruel and then converted), from Federigo Borromeo to Donna Prassede.

== Cast ==
Actor	Role
Delphine Forest	Lucia Mondella
Danny Quinn	Renzo Tramaglino
Jenny Seagrove	The Nun of Monza
Burt Lancaster	Cardinal Federigo Borromeo
Franco Nero	Friar Cristoforo
F. Murray Abraham	Innominato
Gary Cady	Don Rodrigo
Helmut Berger	Egidio
Fernando Rey	Attilio's Uncle
Valentina Cortese	Donna Prassede
Gisela Stein	Lucia's Mother
Alberto Sordi	Don Abbondio
Dario Fo	Azzeccagarbugli (lawyer)
Walter Chiari	Tonio
Renzo Montagnani	Don Ferrante
Mathieu Carrière	Count Attilio
Giampiero Albertini	Nibbio
Gordon Mitchell	Don Gonzalo
Paolo Bonacelli	Gertrude's Father
Martine Brochard	Gertrude's Mother
Piera Degli Esposti	Badessa
Leopoldo Trieste	Lucio
Franco Citti	Grignapoco
Rosalina Neri	Perpetua
Enrico Beruschi	Man of Letters
Stefano Davanzati	Gentleman
Gianni Garko	Gentleman's Brother
Bernhard Wicki	Gentleman's Father
Gerardo Amato	Collalto
Galeazzo Benti	Ferrer
Flavio Bucci	"Luna Piena" Policeman
Enzo Robutti	"Luna Piena" Notary
Piero Mazzarella	"Luna Piena" Innkeeper
Wilma De Angelis	Maid
Oliviero Beha	Health commissioner
Roberto Boninsegna	Monatto
Didi Perego	Factoress
Maria Monti	Sister Vittoria
Annie Gorassini	Sabetta
Camillo Milli	Podestà
Corrado Lojacono	Chairman of the Council
Antonella Elia	Matilde

== Reception ==
The final episode had an audience of 12 million viewers in Italy.
