= First Love (1959 film) =

- Directed by: Mario Camerini
- Written by: Age & Scarpelli; Ettore Scola; Leo Benvenuti; Piero De Bernardi; Mario Camerini
- Produced by: Giorgio Agliani; Angelo Rizzoli
- Starring: Carla Gravina; Lorella De Luca
- Cinematography: Tonino Delli Colli
- Music by: Angelo Francesco Lavagnino
- Release date: 1959
- Language: Italian

First Love (Italian: Primo amore) is a 1959 Italian romantic drama film directed by Mario Camerini and starring Carla Gravina.

== Cast ==
- Carla Gravina as Betty Hauptmann
- Lorella De Luca as Francesca
- Raf Mattioli as Piero
- Geronimo Meynier as Luigi Lojacono, aka Giggi
- Christine Kaufmann as Silvia
- Luciano Marin as Marco
- Paola Quattrini as Andreina Palazzi
- Marcello Paolini as Lello Amaduzzi
- Nicolò De Guido as Enrico Boschetti
- Katie Boyle as Miss Luciana
- Luciana Angiolillo as Anna
- Mario Carotenuto as Armando Amaduzzi
- Emma Baron as Miss Maria Lojacono
- Barbara Florian as Daniela Fabbri
- Carlo Giuffrè as Michele Lojacono
- Salvo Libassi as Dr. Arrigo Lojacono
- Mario Pisu as Paolo
- Edoardo Toniolo as Pietro
- Raimondo Van Riel as Professor Palazzi
- Mario Meniconi as The Doorman
- Fabrizio Capucci as Marco's Friend
- Gian Paolo Rosmino as Pino
- Nietta Zocchi as Teresa
