= Franco Fabrizi =

Italian actor (1916–1995)

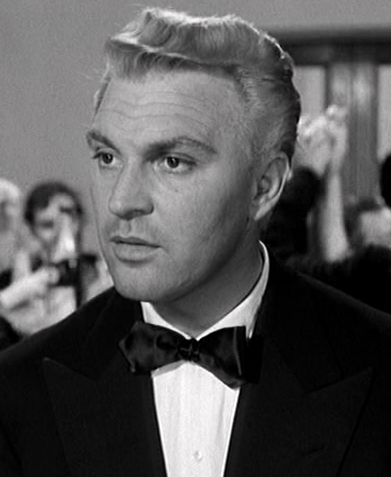
- Fabrizi in Il bidone (1955)
- Born: 15 February 1916; Cortemaggiore, Kingdom of Italy
- Died: 18 October 1995 (aged 79); Cortemaggiore, Italy
- Occupation: actor
- Height: 1.80 m (5 ft 11 in)

Franco Fabrizi (Italian pronunciation: [ˈfraŋko faˈbrittsi]; 15 February 1916 – 18 October 1995) was an Italian actor.

== Life and career ==
Son of a barber and a cinema cashier, Franco Fabrizi started his career as a model and an actor in fotoromanzi. Fabrizi also starred on several revues and stage works, then he debuted on the big screen with a supporting role in Chronicle of a Love (Cronaca di un amore) (1950), Michelangelo Antonioni's feature film debut.

The role that made him known was as Fausto in Federico Fellini's I vitelloni; from then he was inextricably linked to the character of a full-time seducer, a young wastrel, a young not-so-young man who refuses to grow up, a character that he reprised, with different facets, in a great number of films. Past the 1950s, Fabrizi was mainly relegated to character roles in Italian, French and Spanish minor productions; he still appeared on several major works of Italian cinema, and one of his last great roles was in Luchino Visconti's Death in Venice.

In 1993 he had a serious car accident. During his recovery, he was diagnosed with colon cancer, from which he died in 1995.

== Selected filmography ==
- Chronicle of a Love (Cronaca di un amore) Michelangelo Antonioni) (1950) – Fashion show presentator
- The Mistress of Treves (1952)
- The Woman Who Invented Love (1952)
- They Were Three Hundred (1952) – Pisacane
- Heroic Charge (1952) – Captain Franchi
- Ragazze da marito (1952) – Claudio Fortis
- Prisoner in the Tower of Fire (1952)
- I Vitelloni (Federico Fellini) (1953) – Fausto Moretti
- The Pagans (1953) – Fanfulla Da Lodi
- Vortice (1953) – Viaggiani
- Cristo è passato sull'aia (1953) – Giovanni
- Torna! (1954) – Giacomo Marini
- Schiava del peccato (1954) – Carlo
- Nel gorgo del peccato (1954) – Filippo
- Woman of Rome (La romana) (Dino Risi) (1954) – Gino
- Camilla (1954) – Gianni Rinaldi
- Human Torpedoes (1954) – Antonio
- Farewell, My Beautiful Lady (1954) – Marco
- Le Amiche (Michelangelo Antonioni) (1955) – Cesare Pedoni, the architect
- Il bidone (Federico Fellini) (1955) – Roberto
- Roman Tales (1955) – Alvaro Latini
- Calabuch (Luis García Berlanga) (1956) – Langosta
- Peccato di castità (1956)
- Noi siamo le colonne (1956) – Aldo
- The Doll That Took the Town (1956) – Aldo
- Nights of Cabiria (Federico Fellini) (1957) – Giorgio (uncredited)
- No Sun in Venice (1957) – Busetti
- Una pelliccia di visone (1957) – Francipane
- Anyone Can Kill Me (1957) – Karl Herman
- Husbands in the City (1957) – Alberto De Carlo
- È arrivata la parigina (1958) – Nick
- Adorabili e bugiarde (1958) – Geronti
- Le dritte (1958) – Amleto Bettini
- Mogli pericolose (1958) – Bruno
- Racconti d'estate (1958) – Sandro Morandi
- Anche l'inferno trema (1958)
- Addio per sempre! (1958) – Mike
- Witness in the City (1959) – Lambert – le radio-taxi de nuit
- The Moralist (1959) – Giovanni
- Wild Cats on the Beach (1959) – Nicola Ferrara
- The Nights of Lucretia Borgia (1959) – Cesare Borgia
- The Black Chapel (1959) – Graf Emanuele Rossi
- The Facts of Murder (1959) – Massimo Valdarena
- Le sorprese dell'amore (1959) – Battista Crispi
- I Genitori in Blue-Jeans (1960) – Gianni
- Run with the Devil (1960) – Giosuè Corsetti
- Le svedesi (1960) – Franco
- La moglie di mio marito (1961) – Giorgio Hintermann
- The Wastrel (1961) – Rudi Veronese
- Three Faces of Sin (1961) – Philippe Guerbois
- Duel of Champions (1961) – Curazio
- A Difficult Life (Una Vita Difficile) (Dino Risi) (1961) – Franco Simonini
- Quattro notti con Alba (1962) – Lieutenant Zecchini
- Una domenica d'estate (1962) – Giacomo
- Night Train to Milan (1962) – L'uomo snob
- Copacabana Palace (1962)
- La donna degli altri è sempre più bella (1963) – Paolo (segment "Bagnino Lover")
- Rat Trap (1963) – Paul
- Storm Over Ceylon (1963) – Manuel Da Costa
- Casablanca, Nest of Spies (1963) – Barón Max von Stauffen
- Gli onorevoli (1963) – Roberto Cicconetti
- The Commandant (1963) – Sandrelli
- I maniaci (1964) – Sita (segment "Lo sport")
- I complessi (1965) – Francesco Martello (segment "Guglielmo il Dentone")
- I Knew Her Well (Antonio Pietrangeli) (1965) – Paganelli
- Le reflux (1965)
- The Birds, the Bees and the Italians (Signore e signori) (Pietro Germi) (1966) – Lino Benedetti
- El misterioso señor Van Eyck (1966)
- A Question of Honour (1966) – Egidio Porcu
- Vacanze sulla neve (1966)
- Le facteur s'en va-t-en guerre (1966) – Ritoni
- Che notte ragazzi! (1966) – D. Luis
- The Viscount (1967) – Ramon
- Bang Bang (1967) – Mario Raffaelli
- Anyone Can Play (1967) – Luisa's lover
- The Little Bather (1968) – Marcello Cacciaperotti
- Madigan's Millions (1968) – Condon
- Dismissed on His Wedding Night (1968) – Chauffeur
- Satyricon (1969) – Ascilto
- L'homme orchestre (1970) – Franco Buzzini – le fiancé de Françoise
- A Pocketful of Chestnuts (1970) – Bernardi
- Death in Venice (Morte a Venezia) (Luchino Visconti) (1971) – Barber
- Roma Bene (1971) – Nino Rappi
- Stanza 17-17 palazzo delle tasse, ufficio imposte (1971) – Prince Gondrano Pantegani del Cacco
- Il provinciale (1971) – Colombo
- Panhandle 38 (1972) – Fernand
- Execution Squad (1972) – Francesco Bettarini
- Shadows Unseen (1972) – Commissioner Resta
- The Italian Connection (1972) – Enrico Moroni
- Il generale dorme in piedi (1972) – Col. Beltrami
- Cake in the Sky (1973)
- The Lady Has Been Raped (1973) – The photographer
- Società a responsabilità molto limitata (1973) – Don Celestino
- La notte dell'ultimo giorno (1973) – Sergio Varzi
- Ancora una volta prima di lasciarci (1973) – Marco
- Don't Touch the White Woman! (Marco Ferreri) (1974) – Tom
- Claretta and Ben (1974) – Franco De Rosa
- What Have They Done to Your Daughters? (1974) – Bruno Paglia
- Killer Cop (1975) – Luigi Balsamo
- Last Stop on the Night Train (Aldo Lado) (1975) – The Voyeur on the Train
- Act of Aggression (1975) – Sauguet
- The Flower in His Mouth (1975) – Dottore Sanguedolce
- La verginella (1975)
- Stato interessante (1977) – Gaetano La Monica (second story)
- L'affaire Suisse (1978) – Poschetti
- Action (1980) – The Producer
- Habibi, amor mío (1981)
- A Proper Scandal (1984) – Count Guarienti
- Mi faccia causa (1984)
- Ginger and Fred (1986) – Show host
- Giovanni Senzapensieri (1986) – Gino
- Grandi magazzini (1986) – Ing. Zambuti
- The Little Devil (Il piccolo diavolo) (Roberto Benigni) (1988) – Monsignore
- Un uomo di razza (1989) – Radames
- Ricky & Barabba (1992) – Salvetti
