= The Fifth Commandment (film) =

- Directed by: Duccio Tessari
- Written by: Duccio Tessari; Michael Lentz
- Starring: Helmut Berger; Peter Hooten
- Cinematography: Jost Vacano
- Edited by: Eugenio Alabiso
- Music by: Armando Trovajoli
- Production companies: Oase Film Essen; Zweites Deutsches Fernsehen
- Distributed by: Constantin Film
- Release date: 24 August 1978
- Running time: 115 minutes
- Countries: Italy; West Germany
- Language: German

The Fifth Commandment (Italian: L'alba dei falsi dei, German: Das fünfte Gebot) is a 1978 Italian-West German drama film directed by Duccio Tessari.

== Cast ==
- Helmut Berger as Bernhard Redder
- Peter Hooten as Leo Redder
- Evelyne Kraft as Evelyn Pages
- Umberto Orsini as Vater Redder
- Udo Kier as Peter Dümmel
- Kurt Zips as Atsche Kummer
- Heinrich Giskes as Rudi Linnemann
- Lorella De Luca as Mutter Redder
