= The Return of Ringo =

1965 film

- Italian theatrical release poster
- Directed by: Duccio Tessari
- Screenplay by: Duccio Tessari; Fernando Di Leo
- Story by: Duccio Tessari; Fernando Di Leo
- Produced by: Luciano Ercoli; Alberto Pugliesi
- Starring: Giuliano Gemma; Fernando Sancho; Hally Hammond; Nieves Navarro; Antonio Casas; Manuel Muñiz; George Martin
- Cinematography: Francisco Marin
- Edited by: Licia Quaglia
- Music by: Ennio Morricone
- Production companies: Produzioni Cinematografiche Mediterranee; Rizzoli Film; P.C. Balcázar
- Distributed by: Cineriz
- Release date: December 1965 (Italy)
- Countries: Italy; Spain

The Return of Ringo (Italian: Il ritorno di Ringo) is a 1965 Italian spaghetti Western film directed by Duccio Tessari from a screenplay he had co-written with Fernando Di Leo, inspired by Homer's Odyssey. It stars Giuliano Gemma (billed as 'Montgomery Wood') in the title role, which, in spite of sharing the same name with that of A Pistol for Ringo along with most of the actors and the crew, is not a sequel to that film and deals with an entirely new character and a storyline. It also stars Fernando Sancho, Nieves Navarro, George Martin, Antonio Casas, and Hally Hammond.

Set in the aftermath of the American Civil War, Captain Montgomery Brown (nicknamed Ringo) returns to his hometown to find it taken over by a group of treacherous renegades and his family murdered. At the risk of being recognized due to his high social class, Ringo disguises himself as a wandering peasant in order to observe the new order in town and use it against those who run it, exacting both justice upon its evildoers and get revenge in the long run.

The film's score is composed by Ennio Morricone.

== Cast ==
- Giuliano Gemma "Montgomery Wood" as Captain Montgomery "Ringo" Brown
- Fernando Sancho as Esteban Fuentes
- Hally Hammond as Hally Fitzgerald Brown
- Nieves Navarro as Rosita
- Antonio Casas as Sheriff Carson
- George Martin as Don Fernando Paco Fuentes
- Pajarito as Miosotis (Morning Glory)
- Tunet Vila as Mimbreno, the Apache medicine man
- Víctor Bayo as Jeremiah Pitt, the Saloon owner
- Mónica Sugranes as Elizabeth Brown
- Juan Torres as Bartender at Mimbres' village
- José Halufi as Gravedigger
- Fernando Di Leo as Fuentes Henchman
- Frank Oliveras as Fuentes Henchman
- Montserrat Prous as Mexican Girl
- Marc Smith as Captain Montgomery 'Ringo' Brown
- Duccio Tessari as Fuentes Henchman
- Ricardo Valor as Priest
- Rinaldo Zamperla as Fuentes Henchman

== Music ==
Il ritorno di Ringo

Soundtrack album by Ennio Morricone
- Released: 1965 (Original album)
- Genre: Soundtrack
- Label: RCA Italiana

Ennio Morricone chronology
Idoli controluce (1965)	Il ritorno di Ringo (1965)	Seven Guns for the MacGregors (1966)

All music by Ennio Morricone.

1. "Il ritorno di Ringo – Main Titles" – 2:16 (Lyrics and vocals by Maurizio Graf)
2. "The Disguise" – 2:23
3. "Mariachi #1" – 1:51
4. "Violence" – 5:54
5. "Sheriff Carson" – 1:20
6. "The Fuentes" – 1:08
7. "Mariachi #2" – 2:03
8. "Main Titles Instrumental" – 1:26
9. "Barnaba's Bamba" – 2:34
10. "The Wedding and The Revenge" – 1:28
11. "The Funeral" – 2:03
12. "Peace Comes Back in Mimbres" – 2:20

== Release ==
The Return of Ringo was released in December 1965 in Italy. The film was the third highest-grossing film in Italy in 1965 behind For a Few Dollars More and A Pistol for Ringo.

== Reception ==
From contemporary reviews, the Monthly Film Bulletin that the film's story is "treated with an imagination unequaled in other Italian Westerns." The review continued that "what makes the film more than merely clever is the handing of its theme: as in the second half of The Odyssey, the hero-treated by all as dead-has to rediscover his identity." The review during the film's climax and ending "Tessari shiningly confirms his sense of the poetic." "Hawk." of Variety described the film as "fair-to-middlin'" noting the cliches the film had, but that Tessari "keeps things lively, alternating action and humor" while noting the violence in the film "bordered on sadism." "Hawk." found the film to be superior to A Pistol for Ringo.
