= The Cats (1968 film) =

1968 film

- Film poster
- Directed by: Duccio Tessari
- Screenplay by: Mario Di Nardo; Ennio De Concini; Duccio Tessari
- Story by: Mario Di Nardo
- Produced by: Turi Vasile
- Starring: Rita Hayworth; Giuliano Gemma; Klaus Kinski; Margaret Lee; Serge Marquand; Claudine Auger
- Cinematography: Carlo Carlini
- Edited by: Mario Morra
- Music by: Michel Magne
- Production companies: Ultra Film; P.E.C.F.; Rhein Main
- Distributed by: Warner Bros.-Seven Arts
- Release dates: 30 October 1968 (Italy); 29 May 1969 (France); 6 June 1969 (West Germany)
- Running time: 102 minutes
- Countries: Italy; France; West Germany
- Box office: ₤702 million

The Cats (Italian: I bastardi) is a 1968 crime film directed by Duccio Tessari, starring Rita Hayworth and Klaus Kinski.

== Cast ==
- Giuliano Gemma as Jason
- Klaus Kinski as Adam
- Margaret Lee as Karen
- Rita Hayworth as Martha
- Claudine Auger as Barbara
- Serge Marquand as Jimmy
- Umberto Raho as Doctor

== Production ==
The film had the working title of The Cats. The credits of the film state that the film is an Italian, French and West German co-production. Actor Dan van Husen stated that the film is actually an Italian-Spanish co-production with the initial title being Los Gatos. The film was predominantly shot in Spain, with opening sequences shot in the United States.

== Release ==
The Cats was released in Italy as I bastardi on 30 October 1968 where it was distributed by Warner Bros.-Seven Arts. The film grossed a total of 702,781,000 Italian lire on its theatrical run in Italy. In 1969 it was released in France and West Germany on 25 May and 6 June respectively. The film was released on the Warner Archive Collection on DVD under the title The Cats.

== Reception ==
A contemporary review in the Monthly Film Bulletin commented that the film was "no more than an updated Italian Western with all the familiar sadistic ingredients" and that "apart from a quite competently staged desert car chase, Duccio Tessari (who showed real flair in A Pistol for Ringo) directs as though he had never been behind the camera before"

== See also ==
- Klaus Kinski filmography
- List of crime films of the 1960s
- List of Italian films of 1968

== Notes ==
=== References ===
- Curti, Roberto (2013). Italian Crime Filmography, 1968-1980. McFarland. ISBN 978-0786469765.
