= Duccio Tessari =

Italian filmmaker (1926–1994)

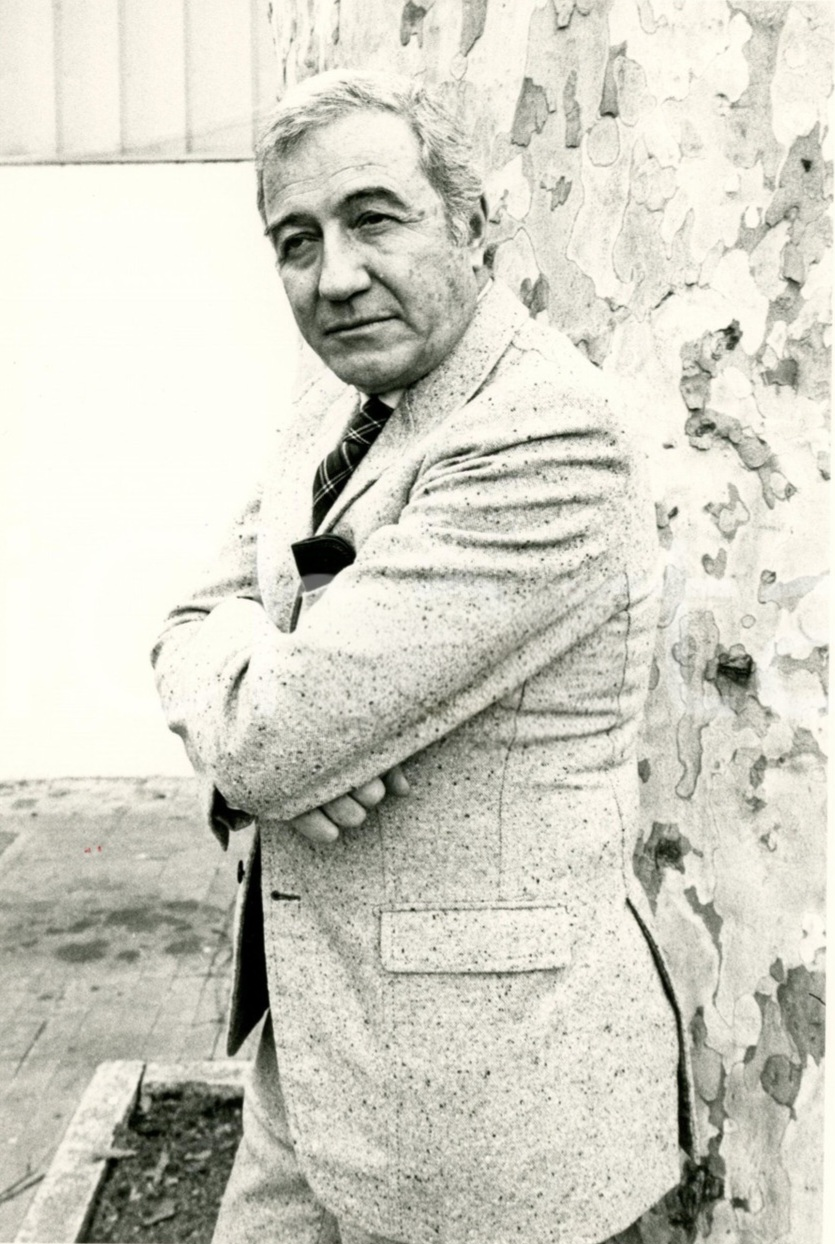
- Tessari in the 1970s
- Born: 11 October 1926; Genoa, Liguria, Italy
- Died: 6 September 1994 (aged 67); Rome, Lazio, Italy
- Occupations: Film director; screenwriter
- Spouse: Lorella De Luca

Duccio Tessari (11 October 1926 – 6 September 1994) was an Italian film director, screenwriter and actor, considered one of the fathers of Spaghetti Westerns.

Born in Genoa, Tessari started in the fifties as documentarist and as screenwriter of peplum films. In 1964 he co-wrote Sergio Leone's A Fistful of Dollars, one year later he gained an impressive commercial success and launched the Giuliano Gemma's career with A Pistol for Ringo and its immediate sequel, The Return of Ringo. In 1975, Tessari launched the most popular and successful European depiction of Zorro, when he directed Zorro starring Alain Delon as the titular masked hero. The movie was a smash hit in Europe, Russia, Japan and China.

He later touched different genres and worked in RAI, directing some successful TV-series. He died of cancer in Rome, at 67. He was married to actress Lorella De Luca.

== Filmography ==
Note: The films listed as N/A are not necessarily chronological.

Title	Year	Credited as				Notes	Ref(s)
Title	Year	Director	Screenwriter	Screen story writer	Other	Notes	Ref(s)
Kanonenserenade	1958		Yes		Yes	Assistant director	
The Last Days of Pompeii	1959		Yes		Yes	Assistant director	
Carthage in Flames	1960		Yes				
Messalina	1960		Yes	Yes			
Goliath and the Dragon	1960		Yes				
Colossus and the Amazon Queen	1960				Yes	Assistant director	
The Revolt of the Slaves	1960		Yes				
Hercules and the Conquest of Atlantis	1961		Yes				
Goliath and the Vampires	1961		Yes				
The Colossus of Rhodes	1961		Yes				
Samson and the Seven Miracles of the World	1961		Yes				
The Wonders of Aladdin	1961		Yes				
Hercules in the Haunted World	1961		Yes				
Duel of the Titans	1961		Yes				
My Son, the Hero	1962	Yes	Yes				
Marco Polo	1962		Yes				
Il fornaretto di Venezia	—N/a	Yes	Yes				
The Avenger of Venice	1964		Yes				
A Fistful of Dollars	1964		Yes				
Secret of the Sphinx	—N/a	Yes	Yes				
A Pistol for Ringo	1965	Yes	Yes	Yes			
The Return of Ringo	1965	Yes	Yes	Yes			
Una voglia da morire	—N/a	Yes	Yes				
Kiss Kiss...Bang Bang	1966	Yes	Yes	Yes			
Seven Guns for the MacGregors	1966		Yes				
Dick Smart 2.007	—N/a		Yes				
Per amore... per magia...	1967	Yes	Yes				
La dama de Beyrut	—N/a			Yes			
The Cats	1968	Yes	Yes				
Better a Widow	—N/a	Yes	Yes				
Train for Durango	—N/a		Yes	Yes			
Sundance and the Kid	1969	Yes	Yes				
Quella piccola differenza	—N/a	Yes	Yes				
Death Occurred Last Night	1970	Yes	Yes				
The Bloodstained Butterfly	—N/a	Yes	Yes				
Long Live Your Death	1971	Yes	Yes				
Winged Devils	—N/a	Yes	Yes				
The Heroes	—N/a	Yes					
Tony Arzenta	1973	Yes					
Three Tough Guys	1974	Yes					
Puzzle	—N/a	Yes	Yes				
Zorro	1975	Yes					
Sexycop	1976	Yes	Yes				
Safari Express	—N/a	Yes	Yes	Yes			
The Fifth Commandment	1978	Yes	Yes	Yes			
Un centesimo di secondo	—N/a	Yes	Yes				
Tex and the Lord of the Deep	1985	Yes	Yes				
Please, Let the Flowers Live	1989	Yes	Yes				
There Was a Castle with Forty Dogs	—N/a	Yes	Yes				
