= Long Days of Vengeance =

1967 film

- Directed by: Florestano Vancini
- Screenplay by: Fernando Di Leo; Augusto Caminito
- Story by: Mahnahen Velasco
- Starring: Giuliano Gemma; Francisco Rabal; Conrado Sanmartin
- Cinematography: Francisco Marin
- Edited by: Angeles Prufia
- Music by: Armando Trovajoli
- Production companies: *Produzioni Cinematografiche Mediterranee - P.C.M.; P.C. Mingyar; Rome-Paris Films
- Distributed by: I.F.C. - International Film Company
- Release date: 1967
- Countries: Italy; Spain

Long Days of Vengeance (Italian: I lunghi giorni della vendetta is a 1967 Western film directed by Florestano Vancini. It is the only western directed by Vancini, here credited as Stan Vance. The film is a Spaghetti Western version of Alexandre Dumas' novel The Count of Monte Cristo.

== Plot ==
Ted Barnett escapes from prison and returns to his home town to prove that he did not commit murder and also find the man who murdered his father. To do this he must disclose the respected landowner Cobb as a smuggler.

== Cast ==
- Giuliano Gemma as Ted Barnett
- Francisco Rabal as Sheriff Douglas
- Gabriella Giorgelli as Dulcie
- Conrado San Martín as Cobb
- Nieves Navarro as Dolly
- Doro Corrà as Morgan
- Milo Quesada as Gomez

== Release ==
Long Days of Vengeance was released in 1967. It has also been released as The Deadliest Gun Fight.

== Reception ==
In his investigation of narrative structures in Spaghetti Western films, Fridlund groups this film with some other successful westerns where the Giuliano Gemma character is falsely accused and seeks vindication. What sets I lunghi giorni della vendetta apart is its skillful play with ironic humour and surprises.

== See also ==
- List of Italian films of 1967
