= Africa Express (film) =

1975 film directed by Michele Lupo

- Directed by: Michele Lupo
- Written by: Mario Amendola; Bruno Corbucci; Gabriele Martin
- Produced by: Tritone Filmindustria (Roma); Deutsche Fox Film; Salvatore Alabiso
- Starring: Giuliano Gemma; Ursula Andress; Jack Palance
- Cinematography: Roberto Gerardi
- Edited by: Eugenio Alabiso
- Music by: Guido & Maurizio De Angelis
- Distributed by: Cidif
- Release date: 1975
- Running time: 95 min.
- Country: Italy
- Language: Italian

Africa Express is a 1975 Italian adventure film starring Ursula Andress, Giuliano Gemma, and Jack Palance that was filmed in Rhodesia. A sequel Safari Express with the same leads followed a year later.

== Plot ==
John Baxter is a freewheeling trader of goods in Africa with a pet chimpanzee and one dream: to save enough money to buy a gas station in Detroit. Madeleine Cooper is the lady of mystery he runs into as she flees from Hunter.

== Cast ==
- Giuliano Gemma as John Baxter
- Ursula Andress as Madeleine Cooper
- Jack Palance as William Hunter
- Giuseppe Maffioli as Father Gasparetto
- Luciana Turina as Lily
- Rossana Di Lorenzo as Mitzy
- Nello Pazzafini as Hunter's Henchman
- John Wener as Louis Renois
- Romano Puppo
- Sergio Smacchi
- Alberto Dell'Acqua
- Werner Doll
- Biba the chimpanzee

== Reception ==
Italian film critic Marco Giusti calls the film a "cute little movie" (Italian: "filmetto carino"), the best being Ursula Andress dressed as dirty sister.

== Bibliography ==
- Giusti, Marco (1999). dizionario dei film italiani STRACULT [sic]. Cles: Sterling & Kupfer. ISBN 88-200-2919-7.
