= Ben and Charlie =

1971 film by Michele Lupo

- Theatrical release poster
- Directed by: Michele Lupo
- Written by: Sergio Donati; George Eastman
- Produced by: Sergio Garrone
- Starring: Giuliano Gemma; George Eastman
- Cinematography: Joe D'Amato
- Edited by: Antonietta Zita
- Music by: Gianni Ferrio
- Release date: 22 February 1972 (Italy)
- Country: Italy
- Language: Italian

Ben and Charlie (also known as Amigo, Stay Away and Humpty Dumpty Gang; Italian: Amico, stammi lontano almeno un palmo) is a 1972 Spaghetti Western comedy movie directed by Michele Lupo.

== Plot ==
Just out of jail, Ben (Giuliano Gemma) finds his old buddy Charlie (George Eastman), an adventurer from peanuts who ekes out a living as a card cheat. The two make common cause, but soon the problems begin...

== Cast ==
- Giuliano Gemma: Ben Bellew
- George Eastman: Charlie Logan
- Marisa Mell: Sarah
- Vittorio Congia: Alan Smith
- Giacomo Rossi Stuart: Hawkins, Pinkerton detective
- Luciano Catenacci: Kurt
- Remo Capitani: Charro
- Giovanni Pazzafini: Butch
- Aldo Sambrell: Sheriff Walkers

== Releases ==
The film was released in Italy on 22 February 1972.

Wild East released the film in its original widescreen aspect ratio on an out-of-print limited edition Region 0 DVD on 8/4/05. The DVD also contains an alternate title sequence with a different theme song.
