= There Was a Castle with Forty Dogs =

- Italian theatrical release poster by Enzo Sciotti
- Directed by: Duccio Tessari
- Produced by: Franco Cristaldi
- Cinematography: Marco Onorato; Carlos Suárez
- Edited by: Mario Morra
- Music by: Detto Mariano
- Distributed by: Titanus
- Release date: 1990
- Running time: 98 minutes
- Language: Italian

There Was a Castle with Forty Dogs (Italian: C'era un castello con 40 cani) is a 1990 comedy film, starring Peter Ustinov and directed by Duccio Tessari. It is based on the novel Au bonheur des chiens by Rémo Forlani.

== Cast ==
- Peter Ustinov: the vet Muggione
- Delphine Forest: Violetta
- Roberto Alpi: Bob
- Mercedes Alonso: Giovanna
- Salvatore Cascio: Tom
- Jean-Claude Brialy: the judge
- José María Caffarel: the notary
- Gina Rovere: Jolinka
- Nicola Pietrangeli: the President
