= Sundance and the Kid =

1969 film

- Directed by: Duccio Tessari
- Screenplay by: Giorgio Salvioni; Duccio Tessari
- Story by: Ennio Flaiano
- Starring: Giuliano Gemma; Nino Benvenuti; Sydne Rome
- Cinematography: Manuel Rojas
- Edited by: Mario Morra
- Music by: Gianni Ferrio
- Production companies: Compagnia Finanziaria Cinematografica; Ultra Film; Hesperia Films
- Distributed by: Interfilm (Italy)
- Release date: 1969
- Countries: Italy; Spain

Sundance and the Kid (Italian: Vivi o, preferibilmente, morti, lit. 'Alive or Preferably Dead') is a 1969 Spaghetti Western comedy directed by Duccio Tessari and starring Giuliano Gemma, Nino Benvenuti, and Sydne Rome. The film was also released under the titles Alive or Preferably Dead and Sundance Cassidy and Butch the Kid.

== Plot ==
Two estranged brothers, city gambler Monty (Gemma) and Wild West farmer Ted Mulligan (Benvenuti), inherit $300,000 from their late uncle, on condition that they endure to live together for six months. The two start fighting about everything, and trouble begins as soon as Monty arrives in Ted's hometown.

== Cast ==
- Giuliano Gemma as Monty Mulligan
- Nino Benvenuti as Ted Mulligan
- Sydne Rome as Rossella Scott
- Julio Peña as Dottore
- Antonio Casas as Barnds
- Cris Huerta as Jim
- George Rigaud as Mr. Scott
- Dan van Husen as Ranger
- Víctor Israel as Mayoral Candidate's Henchman

== Release ==
Sundance and the Kid was first distributed in 1969.

== Reception ==
Bert Fridlund described Sundance and the Kid as being a forerunner to the Trinity films series starring Terence Hill and Bud Spencer which reshaped the Spaghetti Western.
