= Kiss Kiss...Bang Bang =

1966 film by Duccio Tessari

- Theatrical release poster
- Directed by: Duccio Tessari
- Screenplay by: Bruno Corbucci; Fernando Di Leo; Duccio Tessari
- Story by: Bruno Corbucci; Fernando Di Leo; Duccio Tessari
- Starring: Giuliano Gemma; George Martin; Lorella De Luca; Nieves Navarro; Daniele Vargas; George Rigaud
- Cinematography: Francisco Marin
- Edited by: Licia Quaglia
- Music by: Bruno Nicolai
- Production companies: Produzioni Cinematografiche Mediterranee; Rizzoli Film, P.C.
- Distributed by: Cineriz
- Release date: 16 May 1966 (Italy)
- Countries: Italy; Spain

Kiss Kiss... Bang Bang is a 1966 Eurospy comedy film directed by Duccio Tessari and starring Giuliano Gemma, George Martin, Lorella De Luca, Nieves Navarro, Daniele Vargas and George Rigaud.

== Plot ==
Former British spy Kirk Warren has been sentenced to death after he was caught attempting to steal a million dollars. At the last minute, he is given the chance by his former superior Sir Sebastian Wilcox to redeem himself, by seizing a secret formula before the notorious terrorist Mr. X can get hold of it. Warren pretends to comply with his assignment but actually plans to sell the formula to Mr. X instead of delivering it to the Secret Service.

Warren finds an apparent buyer in Tol Lim, an agent for Mr. X. However, Lim actually plans to double-cross and blackmail Warren. Warren realizes the deception and manages to defeat Mr. X and unmask him - revealing that he is none other than Sir Sebastian. The spymaster had exploited Warren's abilities from the beginning with the intention of obtaining the formula himself to resell it and enrich himself. Warren defeats his former and hands him over to the Secret Service.

== Cast ==
- Giuliano Gemma as Kirk Warren
- George Martin as Chico Pérez
- Lorella De Luca as Frida Kadar
- Nieves Navarro as Alina Shakespeare
- Daniele Vargas as Tol Lim
- George Rigaud as Sir Sebastian Wilcox
- Antonio Casas as Prof. Padereski
- Pajarito as Mr. Dupont
- Carlo Gentili as Col. Smithson

== Production ==
Screenwriter Fernando Di Leo had long partnered with director Duccio Tessari, with the two writing several Westerns together. Kiss Kiss...Bang Bang was their first non-Western they collaborated on and originally titled Requiem per una spia (lit. 'Requiem for a Spy'). Di Leo stayed with Bruno Corbucci for a month in Spain to write it, and said that the films best gags were written by Tessari.

The opening song for the film was composed by Bruno Nicolai and Pino Cassia, and sung by Nancy Cuomo.

The film was shot in Rome and London.

== Releases ==
Kiss Kiss... Bang Bang was distributed in Italy by Cineriz and released on 16 May 1966. Fernando Di Lio biographers Roberto Curti and Deminico Monetti described the film as a flop at the domestical Italian box office.
