= Somewhere Beyond Love =

1974 film

- A poster bearing the film's Italian title: Delitto d'amore
- Directed by: Luigi Comencini
- Written by: Luigi Comencini; Ugo Pirro
- Produced by: Gianni Hecht Lucari; Renato Jaboni
- Starring: Giuliano Gemma; Stefania Sandrelli
- Cinematography: Luigi Kuveiller
- Edited by: Nino Baragli
- Music by: Carlo Rustichelli
- Release date: 27 April 1974
- Running time: 105 minutes
- Country: Italy
- Language: Italian

Somewhere Beyond Love (Italian: Delitto d'amore) is a 1974 Italian drama film directed by Luigi Comencini. It was entered into the 1974 Cannes Film Festival. It won the Grand Prix of the Belgian Film Critics Association.

== Cast ==
- Giuliano Gemma - Nullo Bronzi
- Stefania Sandrelli - Carmela Santoro
- Brizio Montinaro - Pasquale Santoro
- Renato Scarpa - the doctor
- Cesira Abbiati - Adalgisa
- Rina Franchetti
- Emilio Bonucci
- Antonio Iodice
- Pippo Starnazza
- Walter Valdi - (as Walter Pinetti Valdi)
- Bruno Cattaneo
- Torquato Tessarini
- Marisa Rosales
- Luigi Antonio Guerra
- Carla Mancini
