= Paris Independent Film Festival =

- Location: Paris, France
- Founded: 2015
- Language: International
- Website: Official Website

The Paris Independent Film Festival is an annual film festival showcasing international independent films that takes place in Paris, France. It features a competition and awards films in various categories. It has a special emphasis on films that have no distribution yet, but also screens other films out of competition.

== About ==
The festival was founded in 2015 and takes place at the Reflet Médicis theatre in Paris. It showcases short and feature films of any genre, from narrative to documentary. An international jury selects and awards the presented films. The festival showcases previews, world premieres as well as films that already screened at other festivals.
