= A Pistol for Ringo =

1965 film by Duccio Tessari

- Italian theatrical release poster
- Italian: Una pistola per Ringo
- Directed by: Duccio Tessari
- Screenplay by: Duccio Tessari; Uncredited: Alfonso Balcázar; Fernando di Leo; Enzo Dell'Aquila
- Produced by: Luciano Ercoli; Alberto Pugliese
- Starring: Giuliano Gemma; Fernando Sancho; Lorella De Luca; Nieves Navarro; Antonio Casas; George Martin
- Cinematography: Francisco Marín
- Edited by: Licia Quaglia
- Music by: Ennio Morricone
- Production companies: Produzioni Cinematografiche Mediterranee; Balcázar Producciones Cinematográficas
- Distributed by: Cineriz (Italy)
- Release date: 12 May 1965 (Italy)
- Running time: 98 minutes
- Countries: Italy; Spain
- Language: Italian
- Box office: $1.9 million (Italy); 17,379,404 pesetas (Spain)

A Pistol for Ringo (Italian: Una pistola per Ringo) is a 1965 Spaghetti Western film written and directed by Duccio Tessari, and starring Giuliano Gemma (billed as 'Montgomery Wood'), alongside Fernando Sancho, Nieves Navarro, George Martin, Antonio Casas, José Manuel Martín and Lorella De Luca. The story follows an imprisoned gunfighter (Gemma) who is recruited to infiltrate a ranch that has been taken over by bandits during the Christmas holiday.

The film launched Gemma's career as a leading man in the Spaghetti Western genre. It was followed by a standalone sequel, The Return of Ringo, which released later that same year.

== Plot ==
In southern Texas, near the Christmas holiday, the gunfighter Ringo "Angel Face" kills four men in self-defense. He is arrested for manslaughter and locked up in the town jail where he awaits trial. Soon after, the town's bank is robbed of $50,000 (Note: Worth $1,834,714.29 in 2026.) by Mexican bandits. Their leader, Sancho, is wounded during their escape and the bandits flee to a nearby hacienda owned by Major Clyde, taking the occupants hostage.

The town Sheriff and his posse quickly surround the house. The bandits threaten to kill two hostages a day unless they are allowed to go free. The Sheriff, fearing for the safety of the hostages, including his fiancée Ruby (the Major's daughter), decides to enlist the aid of Ringo. The shootist who agrees to infiltrate the gang and free the hostages in exchange for his freedom and a percentage of the stolen money.

He manages to successfully join up with the gang, posing as a fellow outlaw on the run, however Ringo's plans quickly become complicated as Sancho begins ordering the execution of hostages as well as the tension within the house as Dolores, Sancho's woman, encourages the widower Major Clyde's romantic feelings while one of Sancho's men begins making advances towards Ruby. He at first seems to double-cross the sheriff, however he succeeds in deceiving Sancho and allows the sheriff and his posse to storm the hacienda freeing the hostages and defeating Sancho and his bandits.

== Cast ==
- Giuliano Gemma (credited as 'Montgomery Wood') as Ringo "Angel Face"; a gunfighter who agrees to rescue a family which has been taken hostage by a Mexican bandit. His motives are often self-serving and opportunistic, having agreed in exchange for his release from prison.
- Fernando Sancho as Sancho; a Mexican bandit who has taken a local land baron's family hostage in a desperate attempt to escape from a failed bank robbery.
- Lorella De Luca (as 'Hally Hammond') as Ruby Clyde; the daughter of the Major, she is the fiancée Sheriff Ben, however she soon develops feelings for Ringo.
- Nieves Navarro as Dolores; the girlfriend of Sancho. She is a seductive yet manipulative woman who manages to charm the land baron.
- Antonio Casas as Major Clyde; the land baron whose family has been taken hostage by the bandits. He later becomes romantically involved with Delores, the girlfriend of the bandit leader.
- George Martin as Sheriff Ben; the local sheriff, he arranges Ringo's release in exchange for his help in rescuing the hostages. One of the hostages is Ruby, his fiancée and the daughter of the captive land baron.
- José Manuel Martin as Pedro; one of bandits and lieutenant to Sancho.
- Pajarito as Deputy Tim
- Pablito Alonso as Chico
- Paco Sanz as Colonel
- Juan Casalilla as Mr. Jenkinson, bank director
- Duccio Tessari as Felipe
- Nazzareno Zamperla and José Halufi as Sancho henchmen

== Production ==
Encouraged by the success of Sergio Leone's A Fistful of Dollars the previous year, which he had helped write, Duccio Tessari decided to produce his own western. A well-known screenwriter of horror and "sword-and-sandal" films, he had previously worked with several Spaghetti Western directors, most notably "the two Sergios", as the co-writer of Sergio Leone's The Colossus of Rhodes (1961) and Sergio Corbucci's Romulus and Remus (1961).

He had originally developed the story and co-wrote the script with Alfonso Balcázar. There is more humorous theme, and at times uses slapstick comedy, compared to usual Spaghetti Westerns. The interaction between actors was more relaxed to fully develop the effect of comedic sequences. The main character, loosely based on gunfighter Johnny Ringo, was portrayed as the antithesis of Leone's Man with No Name character — talkative, well dressed, clean-shaven and preferring milk to whiskey.

=== Casting ===
This was the Spaghetti Western film debut of Giuliano Gemma, previously having a co-starring role in Tessari's My Son, the Hero, and would go on to star in a number of other Spaghetti Westerns including One Silver Dollar (1965) and Adios, Gringo (1965). Shortly after the film was released, Gemma compared his role as Ringo to his character in the earlier film commenting "For this film, I acted a character who was a little like the one I had played in My Son, the Hero. Quite simply, I was in a different costume and a different setting."

=== Filming ===
Shot on location in Almeria, Spain, most of the filming took place during early 1965 prior to its premiere in Italy and Spain later that year.

== Reception ==
A Pistol for Ringo was a huge success on the domestic market following its release in Italy on May 12 and in Spain on December 9, 1965, grossing US$1,940,000 in Italy and making over 17,379,404 ₧ (US$104,450) in Spain. The film was shown across Western Europe during early 1966; although it would not appear in Finland and Sweden until early the next year. In Scandinavia, the film generally received an "over 16" rating in Norway (16), Finland (K-16) and Sweden (15 År) while having a significantly higher rating in West Germany (FSK 18) and the United Kingdom (U).

It also did well in the United States, where it was distributed by Embassy Pictures and premiered in New York City on November 2, 1966. The film particularly stood out from its American counterparts, mostly consisting of lower quality b-movies. Its theme, composed by Ennio Morricone and performed by Maurizio Graf, was a more traditional American western ballad compared to his previous work on Spaghetti Westerns and proved popular rising to number one on the Italian charts.

There were some scenes cut in the English-language version to make it more focused on its action and dramatic elements. One scene which was cut includes Ringo removing the bullet from Sancho's shoulder. This specific scene was originally used to explain why Filipe, one of Sancho's henchmen wears a bandage on his hand (Ringo had previously broke his hand with a goblet). Other changes included removing the Christmas carolers and the opening farce duel as well as dialogue and name changes. One example was the during the final scene when Major Clyde throws a flintlock pistol to Ringo. In the English version, Major Clyde claims his grandfather used the pistol at the Battle of Waterloo, however in the original version he states the pistol was used at the Battle of Austerlitz. Austerlitz was used rather than the French defeat at Waterloo to please European audiences. The film retained its original title for the most part, however it was also re-titled as Ballad of Death Valley in the U.S. and Ringo: The Killer elsewhere.

== Follow-ups ==
=== Official sequel ===
With the success of the film, a sequel was quickly put into production and released later that same year. The Return of Ringo was again directed by Duccio Tessari and features much of the same cast, albeit as different characters in an entirely new storyline. In The Return, the titular Ringo as an American Civil War veteran trying to free his hometown from renegade bushwhackers.

=== Unofficial sequels ===
The success of the Tessari/Gemma Ringo films inspired numerous unofficial sequels and spin-offs, most notably $10,000 for Ringo (1965), Ringo and Gringo Against All (1966) and Two R-R-Ringos from Texas (1967). A musical comedy, A Woman for Ringo (1966), was also released and starred Sean Flynn and the Bayona Twins, Pili and Mili Bayona. However, the film received extremely poor reviews, as would most other western-themed musicals.

Other such sequels included Ringo and His Golden Pistol (1966), Ringo of Nebraska (1966) and Ringo the Face of Revenge (1967). The Texican (1966) was retitled Ringo il Texano in Italy.
