= Giuliano Gemma =

Italian actor (1938–2013)

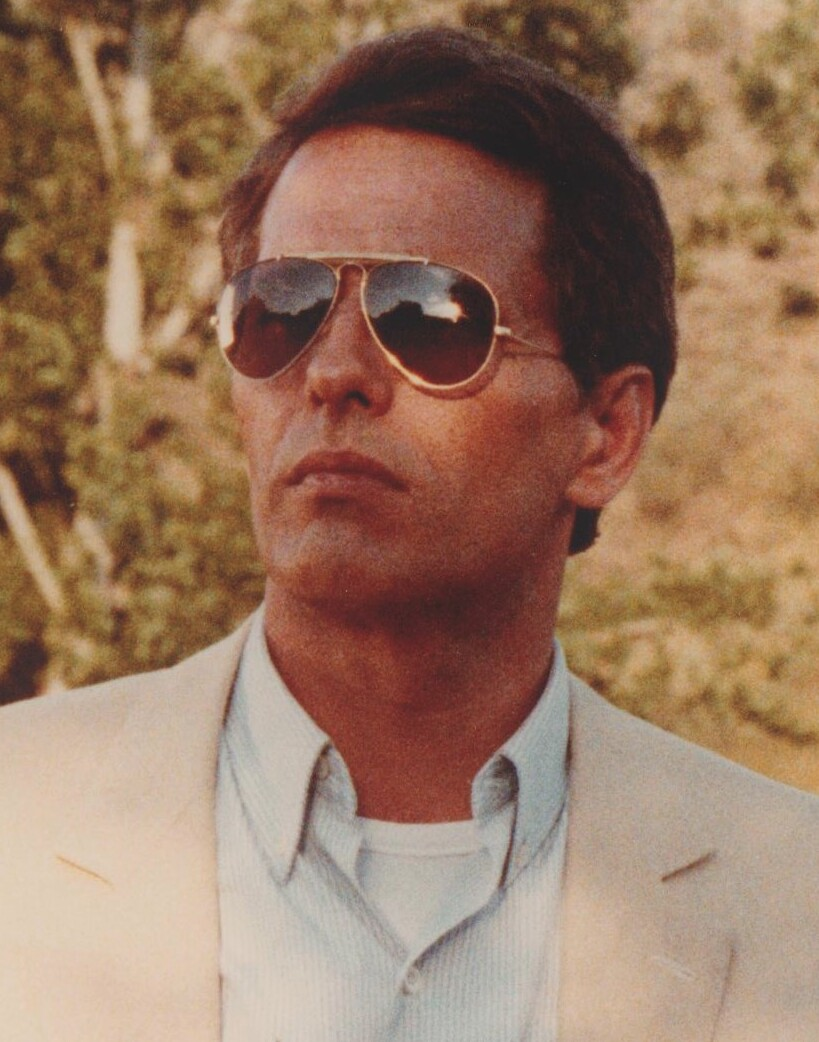
- Gemma in 1983
- Born: 2 September 1938; Rome, Italy
- Died: 1 October 2013 (aged 75); Civitavecchia, Italy
- Other name: Montgomery Wood
- Occupation: Actor
- Years active: 1958–2013
- Children: Vera Gemma (daughter)
- Website: giulianogemma.it

Giuliano Gemma (Italian pronunciation: [ˈdʒɛmma]; 2 September 1938 – 1 October 2013) was an Italian actor. He was best known internationally as a leading man in Spaghetti Westerns, with his breakout role as the titular character in Duccio Tessari's duology A Pistol for Ringo and The Return of Ringo (both 1965). He was nominated for two Nastro d'Argento Awards over the course of his career, and won a Special David di Donatello for his performance in Valerio Zurlini's The Desert of the Tartars (1976).

== Early life ==
Gemma was born in Rome in 1938, the son of Domenico Gemma and Agher Chiarini, and spent his early childhood in Reggio Emilia. An athletic youth, he took up gymnastics, trapeze, and boxing as a teenager, and was friends with professional boxer Nino Benvenuti. He cited Burt Lancaster as an inspiration.

== Career ==
Gemma's introduction to filmmaking came when his father started working as a production assistant at Cinecittà. He first worked as a stuntman, then was offered real acting parts by director Duccio Tessari, starting with the film Arrivano i titani (1962). He also made an appearance in Luchino Visconti's Il Gattopardo as Garibaldi's General. Gemma later went on to star in Spaghetti Westerns in films such as A Pistol for Ringo (Una pistola per Ringo), Blood for a Silver Dollar (Un dollaro bucato), Wanted and Day of Anger (I giorni dell'ira). He was sometimes credited with the anglicized stage name 'Montgomery Wood'. Gemma's career survived the demise of the genre, and he remained active on Italian television.

Gemma played in a variety of movies, including art-house offerings such as Valerio Zurlini's The Desert of the Tartars (Il deserto dei tartari) in 1976. He won a Special David di Donatello for his performance. The following year, he played the controversial prefect Cesare Mori in the biopic I Am the Law (1977). One of his other internationally-notable performances was as a police inspector in Dario Argento's giallo Tenebrae (1982).

Gemma also starred in a web comic named "Man Born Again" (2012) by Eclypsed Word. His last film role was in Woody Allen's To Rome with Love.

== Personal life ==
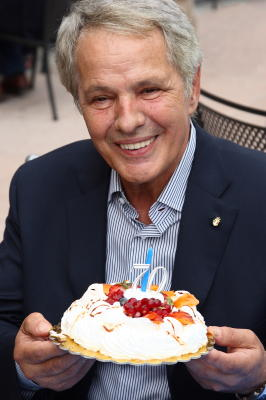
Gemma celebrating his 70th birthday, in 2008.

His daughter, Vera Gemma, is also an actress. Giuliano Gemma also worked as a sculptor.

=== Death ===
On 1 October 2013, Gemma died following a car accident in Cerveteri, near Rome. He was taken to a hospital in Civitavecchia and pronounced dead shortly after his arrival. Two other passengers, a man and his son, were also injured in the accident.

== Partial filmography ==
- Venice, the Moon and You (1958, directed by Dino Risi), as Brando (uncredited)
- My Wife's Enemy (1959, directed by Gianni Puccini), as Son of Nando Terenzi
- You're on Your Own (1959, directed by Mauro Bolognini), as Boxer (uncredited)
- Ben-Hur (1959, directed by William Wyler), as Roman Officer with Messala (uncredited)
- The Cossacks (1960, directed by Victor Tourjansky), as Young Man at Academy (uncredited)
- Messalina (1960, directed by Vittorio Cottafavi), as Marcellus
- A Qualcuna Piace Calvo (1960, directed by Mario Amendola), as Man in the Elevator (uncredited)
- Io amo...tu ami (1961, directed by Alessandro Blasetti)
- Battle of the Worlds (1961, directed by Antonio Margheriti), as Moran
- Boccaccio '70 (1962), as Hercules (uncredited)
- My Son, the Hero (1962, directed by Duccio Tessari), as Krios
- The Shortest Day (1963, directed by Sergio Corbucci) (uncredited)
- The Leopard (1963, directed by Luchino Visconti), as Garibaldi's General
- Shéhérazade (1963, directed by Pierre Gaspard-Huit), as Didier
- Goliath and the Sins of Babylon (1963, directed by Michele Lupo), as Xandros
- The Two Gladiators (1964, directed by Mario Caiano), as Horatius
- Hercules Against the Sons of the Sun (1964, directed by Osvaldo Civirani), as Prince Maytha
- Revolt of the Praetorians (1964, directed by Alfonso Brescia), as Cocceius Nerva
- Angélique, Marquise des Anges (1964, directed by Bernard Borderie), as Nicolas Merlot / "Calembredaine"
- Erik, the Viking (1965, directed by Mario Caiano), as Erik
- Marvelous Angelique (1965, directed by Bernard Borderie), as Nicolas Merlot
- A Pistol for Ringo (1965, directed by Duccio Tessari), as "Angel Face" / Ringo
- Blood for a Silver Dollar (1965, directed by Giorgio Ferroni), as Gary O'Hara
- The Return of Ringo (1965, directed by Duccio Tessari), as Capt. Montgomery Brown / "Ringo"
- Adiós gringo (1965, directed by Giorgio Stegani), as Brent Landers
- La ragazzola (1965, directed by Giuseppe Orlandini), as Raoul
- Kiss Kiss...Bang Bang (1966, directed by Duccio Tessari), as Kirk Warren
- Arizona Colt (1966, directed by Michele Lupo), as Arizona Colt
- For a Few Extra Dollars (1966, directed by Giorgio Ferroni), as Lt. Gary Hammond
- Long Days of Vengeance (1967, directed by Florestano Vancini), as Ted Barnett
- Wanted (1967, directed by Giorgio Ferroni), as Gary Ryan
- Day of Anger (1967, directed by Tonino Valerii), as Scott Mary
- A Sky Full of Stars for a Roof (1968, directed by Giulio Petroni), as Billy Boy / Tim Hawkins
- The Cats (1968, directed by Duccio Tessari), as Jason
- Blow Hot, Blow Cold (1969, directed by Florestano Vancini), as Giulio
- Sundance and the Kid (1969, directed by Duccio Tessari), as Monty Mulligan
- The Price of Power (1969, directed by Tonino Valerii), as Bill Willer
- Corbari (1970, directed by Valentino Orsini), as Silvio Corbari
- When Women Had Tails (1970, directed by Pasquale Festa Campanile), as Ulli
- Long Live Robin Hood (1971, directed by Giorgio Ferroni), as Sir Henry of Nottingham / Robin Hood
- Lover of the Great Bear (1971, directed by Valentino Orsini), as Vladek
- Il maschio ruspante (1972, directed by Antonio Racioppi), as Romolo
- Ben and Charlie (1972, directed by Michele Lupo), as Ben Bellew
- The Master Touch (1972, directed by Michele Lupo), as Marco
- Even Angels Eat Beans (1973, directed by Enzo Barboni), as Sonny
- * The Magnificent Dare Devil (1973, directed by Luciano Ercoli), as Rudy Patti
- Somewhere Beyond Love (1974, directed by Luigi Comencini), as Nullo Branzi
- Charleston (1974, directed by Enzo Barboni), as Sonny Abernathy
- The White, the Yellow, and the Black (1975, directed by Sergio Corbucci), as Blanc de Blanc
- Africa Express (1975, directed by Michele Lupo), as John Baxter
- Safari Express (1976, directed by Duccio Tessari), as John Baxter
- The Desert of the Tartars (1976, directed by Valerio Zurlini), as Major Matis
- California (1977, directed by Michele Lupo), as Michael "California" Random
- I Am the Law (1977, directed by Pasquale Squitieri), as Prefect Cesare Mori
- Closed Circuit (1978, TV movie, directed by Giuliano Montaldo)
- The Greatest Battle (1978, directed by Umberto Lenzi), as Capt. Martin Scott
- Silver Saddle (1978, directed by Lucio Fulci), as Roy Blood
- Corleone (1978, directed by Pasquale Squitieri), as Vito Gargano
- A Man on His Knees (1979, directed by Damiano Damiani), as Nino Peralta
- Operation Leopard (1980, directed by Raoul Coutard), as Adjudant-chef Federico
- The Warning (1980, directed by Damiano Damiani), as Commissario Antonio Baresi
- La baraonda (1980, directed by Florestano Vancini), as Federico Salvi
- Tenebrae (1982, directed by Dario Argento), as Detective Germani
- Odd Squad (1981, directed by Enzo Barboni), as Lt. Joe Kirby
- Pájaros de ciudad (1983, directed by José María Sánchez Álvaro)
- Le Cercle des passions (1983, directed by Claude d'Anna), as Anthony Tursi
- Afghanistan pourquoi ? (1983, directed by Abdellah Mesbahi), as General Suraj
- Claretta (1984, directed by Pasquale Squitieri), as Marcello Petacci
- Tex and the Lord of the Deep (1985, directed by Duccio Tessari), as Tex Willer
- Caccia al ladro d'autore (1985-1986, TV Series), as Capt. Maffei
- Let's Hope It's a Girl (1986, directed by Mario Monicelli), as Nardoni
- Châteauroux district (1987, directed by Philippe Charigot), as Greg Norman
- Al acecho (1988, directed by Gerardo Herrero)
- The Opponent (1988, directed by Sergio Martino), as Martin Duranti
- Rally (1988, TV Series), as Alain Costa
- Dagli Appennini alle Ande (1990, TV Mini-Series), as Ing. Vittorio Vigano
- Non aprite all'uomo nero (1990, TV movie directed by Giulio Questi), as Andréa
- Florence My Love (1991, directed by Seiji Izumi), as Marco Embriani
- Seulement par amour Jo (1991, TV Series), as Alberto Fortis
- Ya no hay hombres (1991, directed by Alberto Fischerman)
- Un bel dì vedremo (1997, directed by Tonino Valerii)
- Desert of Fire (1997, TV Mini-Series, directed by Enzo G. Castellari)
- Un affare trasversale (1998)
- A Respectable Man (1999, directed by Maurizio Zaccaro), as Avv. Alberto Dall'Ora
- Mad Love (2001, directed by Vicente Aranda), as De Veyre
- La bambina dalle mani sporche (2005, TV movie), as Procuratore Concato
- The Inquiry (2006, directed by Giulio Base)
- Imperium: Pompeii (2007, TV Mini-Series), as Titus
- To Rome With Love (2012, directed by Woody Allen), as Hotel Manager (final film role)
