= My Son, the Hero =

- Directed by: Duccio Tessari
- Screenplay by: Ennio De Concini; Duccio Tessari
- Produced by: Franco Cristaldi; Alexandre Minouchkine
- Starring: Pedro Armendariz; Giuliano Gemma; Antonella Lualdi
- Cinematography: Alfio Contini
- Edited by: Maruizio Lucidi
- Music by: Carlo Rustichelli
- Production companies: Vides Cinematografica; Filmsonor; Les Films Arlane
- Release dates: 4 May 1962 (Italy); 31 August 1962 (France)
- Running time: 120 minutes
- Countries: Italy; France
- Language: Italian

My Son, the Hero (Italian title: Arrivano i titani - The Coming of the Titans; alternative UK title: Sons of Thunder) is a 1962 mythological sword-and-sandal comedy film directed by Duccio Tessari and starring Giuliano Gemma, Jacqueline Sassard, Pedro Armendáriz, Antonella Lualdi and Serge Nubret.

== Plot ==
The king of Crete, Cadmos, has just murdered his wife in order to live with his scheming lover Ermione. For this deed, a prophetess curses him in the name of the gods, foretelling him that the day on which his infant daughter Antiope falls in love with a man will be the day he dies. Furious at the gods' judgement, and unable to kill Antiope on the spot (lest the curse would fulfill itself immediately), megalomaniacal Cadmos renounces the gods and proclaims himself one. To this end, he and Ermione undergo a treatment with mystical vapors which render their bodies invulnerable (save for one critical spot on Ermione's chest incautiously left covered).

Once Antiope has reached the proper age, Cadmos plans to have her ordained as a priestess in his service, to have her shut away from the world of men in a life of enforced chastity. Enraged by this intention, Zeus finally decides to send an agent to do his bidding. He turns to the Titans, still incarcerated in the pits of Tartarus, and offers them release if their youngest and weakest, but smartest of their number, Crios, agrees to cast Cadmos into the underworld.

Crios is happy to accept the assignment and is taken to the capitol of Crete, where he meets and befriends Aquiles, Cadmos' mute personal servant. Soon afterwards, he witnesses a slave named Rator being condemned for execution in a gladiatorial fight for the king's amusement. Instantly recognizing his opportunity, Crios begins to criticize the king loudly, starting a merry chase through the city streets before he allows himself to be captured. In the palace dungeon, which is located right beneath Cadmos' throne, he comes face-to-face with Antiope as she is being ordained as a priestess, and instantly becomes smitten with her. When he and his fellow prisoners, including Rator, are made to fight to the death before Cadmos and Ermione, Crios bribes a guard into procuring some oil to rub onto his skin, making him ungrappable for Rator, who has defeated all the others before taking on Crios. As a result, Crios wins and becomes Cadmos' servant, but his uncautious demonstration of his wits and clandestine visits to Antiope eventually alert Ermione to his true intentions.

Finally, one day Cadmos decides to host a literal manhunt, with Rator as the prey. Crios, who accompanies him, manages to separate Cadmos from the rest of the hunting party and take him to the cliffs at the edge of the sea, where they catch up with Rator. However, as Crios prepares to take Cadmos with him, Ermione and the rest of the hunters interfere, and unable to kill Cadmos, Crios and Rator team up and jump off the cliffs into the sea. While hiding in a nearby ruined temple of Pluto, Crios uses the temple's secret connection to make a trip back to Tartarus and steal the helmet of Pluto, an artifact which renders its wearer completely invisible at night. But as he uses the helmet's power to try and rescue Antiope, he finds her spirited away by Cadmos and Ermione. Taking Aquiles with him, Crios learns that Antiope has been imprisoned on the Isle of the Gorgon. He proceeds there with the help of his friends, kills the gorgon in a surprise attack and reunites with Antiope, but upon the gorgon's demise a violent thunderstorm breaks out, alerting Cadmos. Immediately after the storm has settled, the tyrant sends out his troops to the isle to investigate.

Using the helmet, Crios tries to spook the arriving soldiers, but a panicked trooper inadvertently hits him with a spear, wounding him. In order to save his life, Antiope willingly surrenders to the soldiers, and Rator is caught as well. When things look at their bleakest for Crios, however, Zeus decides to release the rest of the Titans to Earth in order to have the task completed. With the most welcome assistance of his brothers, and some of Zeus' thunderbolts purchased from his cyclopedian weaponsmiths, Crios infiltrates the city, attacks its garrison of soldiers, and eventually stirs its oppressed people into rebellion against their tyrant ruler. Joined by the liberated Rator, they begin to penetrate the palace's inner sanctum. When Ermione mocks Cadmos for his failure as a "god", Cadmos kills her and sets out to take revenge on Crios.

In the lower caves of the palace, Crios and his brothers confront Cadmos' priests, who are rendered unkillable by the mystic vapors filling their temple. Crios uses one of the thunderbolts to breach an underwater reservoir, sweeping the vapors away and stripping the priests of their advantage, but the waters also begin to flood Antiope's cell, threatening to drown her. As Crios races to her rescue, Cadmos intercepts him. Knowing he couldn't harm his enemy directly, Crios instead casts the last of his thunderbolts at Cadmos' feet, sending him bodily to Hades. After Antiope is freed, the redeemed Titans make Crete their new home.

== Cast ==
- Pedro Armendáriz: Cadmos
- Giuliano Gemma: Crios
- Antonella Lualdi: Ermione
- Jacqueline Sassard: Antiope
- Serge Nubret: Rator
- Gérard Séty: Achilles
- Tanya Lopert: Licina
- Ingrid Schoeller: Emerate
- Franco Lantieri: Tarete
- Isarco Ravaioli: Centinela
- Fernando Rey: High Priest

== Release ==
My Son, the Hero was released in Italy on 4 May 1962. It was released in France as Les Titans on 31 August 1962.

It was released the United States on 18 September 1963 with a 111 minute running time.

== See also ==
- list of historical drama films
- List of films based on Greco-Roman mythology
- Greek mythology in popular culture
