= Black Sunday (1960 film) =

- Italian film poster by Giuliano Nistri
- Italian: La maschera del demonio
- Directed by: Mario Bava
- Story by: Mario Bava
- Based on: "Viy" by Nikolai Gogol
- Produced by: Massimo De Rita
- Starring: Barbara Steele; John Richardson; Andrea Checchi; Ivo Garrani; Arturo Dominici; Enrico Olivieri
- Cinematography: Mario Bava
- Edited by: Mario Serandrei
- Music by: Roberto Nicolosi
- Production company: Galatea-Jolly Film
- Distributed by: Unidis (Italy)
- Release date: 11 August 1960 (Italy)
- Running time: 87 minutes
- Country: Italy
- Language: Italian
- Box office: ₤139 million

Black Sunday (Italian: La maschera del demonio, lit. 'The mask of the demon') is a 1960 Italian gothic horror film directed by Mario Bava in his official directorial debut, and starring Barbara Steele, John Richardson, Andrea Checchi, Ivo Garrani, Arturo Dominici and Enrico Oliveri. Loosely based on Nikolai Gogol's 1835 short story "Viy", the film takes place in Moldavia and tells the story of a vampire witch who is put to death by her brother, only to return two centuries later to seek revenge upon his descendants.

Having provided cinematography on Hercules (1958) and Hercules Unchained (1959) for the production company Galatea and helping finish two of their other films, Caltiki – The Immortal Monster (1959) and The Giant of Marathon (1959), Bava was permitted by the company's president, Lionello Santi, to make a film for foreign markets; he chose to make a horror film to capitalize on the recent success of Terence Fisher's version of Dracula (1958) for Hammer Film Productions. After he developed a four-page outline faithfully based on Gogol's story, several other screenwriters, both credited and uncredited, worked on the script. Former Rank Organisation contract players Steele and Richardson were cast as Bava felt that British leads would allow the film to compare favorably to Dracula. Filming took place in the studios of Scalera Film in Rome and on location at Castle Massimo in Arsoli; shooting was complicated by Bava's frequent reworking of the script and Steele's conflicts with the crew.

Black Sunday had limited financial success upon its initial Italian release. It was acquired for distribution in the United States by Samuel Z. Arkoff and James H. Nicholson of American International Pictures (AIP), who oversaw numerous alterations to the film prior to its American release, including the removal of some scenes of violence and sexuality, redubbing the dialogue, and replacing Roberto Nicolosi's musical score with one by Les Baxter. The film found greater success upon its American release in 1961 when it became the highest-grossing film to be released by AIP in its first five years of existence. The film was banned for several years in the United Kingdom and did not receive a wide release there until July 1968, when it was released by Border Films as Revenge of the Vampire.

The film received generally negative reviews in Italy and garnered positive reviews abroad in France and the United States, where it received favorable notices in Cahiers du Cinéma, New York Daily News, Time, and Variety. Retrospective reception of Black Sunday remains positive: it was placed at number 84 on a Time Out poll of the best horror films, while critic James Marriott praised the film as the "crowning achievement of Italian gothic horror". The film is now considered to be a pioneering work that set the standards for Italian horror films due to its juxtaposition of beautiful and horrific elements, with strong depictions of eroticism and graphic violence. These elements would be found in later Italian genres, such as the Spaghetti Western and the giallo. The film turned Steele into a movie star in Italy, and led to her appearing in several horror film productions throughout the 1960s and 1970s.

== Plot ==
In 1630s Moldavia, Princess Asa Vajda, a vampiric witch, and her paramour, Javutich, (Note: Contemporary Italian press materials describe Javutich as "fratello della strega" (transl. brother of the witch), suggesting an incestuous relationship between himself and Asa. The dialogue of the English versions refer to him as her "servant" or "serf".) are sentenced to death for sorcery by Asa's brother Griabi. Asa vows revenge and puts a curse on Griabi's descendants. Bronze masks with sharp spikes on the inside are placed over Asa and Javutich's faces and hammered into their flesh, but a sudden storm prevents the villagers from burning them at the stake.

200 years later, Dr. Choma Kruvajan and his assistant, Dr. Andrej Gorobec, are traveling through Moldavia en route to a medical conference when one wheel on their carriage breaks. While waiting for their coachman to fix it, the two wander into a nearby ancient crypt and discover Asa's tomb. Observing her death mask through a glass panel, Kruvajan breaks the panel (and the cross above it) by accident while striking a bat. He removes Asa's death mask, revealing a partially preserved corpse. He cuts his hand on the broken glass, and some of his blood drips onto Asa. This Cross on Asa's tomb strongly resembles the French Cross of Lorraine also known as the Cross of Anjou. Known throughout Eastern Europe as a two‑barred cross symbolizing the Hebrew Christian Biblical message of Sacrifice to remove Sin for the Resurrection of New Life and having no Corpus as in a Body likeness of Christ Jesus.

Returning outside, Kruvajan and Gorobec meet Katia Vajda. She tells them she lives with her father and brother Constantine in a nearby castle that the villagers believe is haunted. Struck by her haunting and melancholic beauty, Gorobec becomes smitten with Katia. The two men leave her and drive to an inn in nearby Mirgorod. Meanwhile, Kruvajan's blood brings Asa back to life. She contacts Javutich telepathically. He rises from his grave and goes to Prince Vajda's castle, where Vajda holds up a crucifix to ward off the reanimated corpse. However, Vajda is so terrified by the visit he becomes paralyzed with fear. Constantine sends a servant to fetch Dr. Kruvajan, but the servant is killed before he can reach the inn. Javutich brings Kruvajan to the castle under the pretext that his services are needed. Javutich leads Kruvajan to Asa's crypt. The witch hypnotizes Kruvajan and says she needs the rest of his blood. Asa then kisses him, turning him into her servant. By Asa's command, Kruvajan follows up on the request to tend to Vajda. He orders the crucifix removed from the room, ostensibly so it will not upset Vajda; this allows Javutich to return later and murder him.

Asa's plan is to revive herself by draining Katia of her life since Katia is physically Asa reincarnated. Puzzled to hear that Kruvajan abandoned his patient shortly before he died, Gorobec questions Sonya, a young girl who saw Javutich take Kruvajan to the castle. She identifies Kruvajan's escort with a painting of Javutich. A priest and Gorobec go to Javutich's grave and find Kruvajan's body inside the coffin. Realizing he is now one of the undead, they kill him by driving a nail through his eye.

Javutich throws Constantine into a death pit and takes Katia to Asa. Asa drains Katia of her youth. When the witch goes to take her blood, the crucifix around Katia's neck thwarts her. Gorobec enters the crypt to save Katia, but Javutich attacks him and pushes him to the edge of the death pit. Constantine uses the last of his strength to pull Javutich into the pit and push Gorobec to safety. Gorobec finds Asa and Katia. Asa pretends to be Katia and tells Gorobec that Katia is the witch. Accordingly, he goes to kill Katia but notices the crucifix she is wearing has no effect on her. He turns to Asa and opens her robe, revealing a fleshless skeletal frame. The priest then arrives with many torch-carrying villagers, and they burn Asa to death. Katia awakens from her stupor, her life and beauty restored, and is reunited with Gorobec.

== Cast ==
Credits adapted from Mario Bava - All the Colors of the Dark and Italian Gothic Horror Films, 1957-1969.

- Barbara Steele as Asa Vajda/Katia Vajda
- John Richardson as Dr. Andrej Gorobec (Dr. Andreas Gorobec in the AIP dub)
- Andrea Checchi as Dr. Choma Kruvajan (Dr. Thomas Kruvajan)
- Ivo Garrani as Prince Vajda
- Arturo Dominici as Igor Javutich (Javuto)
- Enrico Olivieri as Constantine Vajda
- Tino Bianchi as Ivan, the Vajdas' Manservant
- Antonio Pierfederici as the Priest
- Clara Bindi as the Innkeeper
- Mario Passante as Nikita, the Coachman
- Renato Terra as Boris, the Vajdas' Stableman
- Germana Dominici as Sonya, the Innkeeper's Daughter
- Nando Gazzolo as the opening narrator (Italian version, uncredited)

== Production ==
=== Development ===
From the late 1950s to the early 1960s, the Italy-based production company Galatea was among the most active producers of genre films. They had initiated the sword-and-sandal phenomenon of the time with their productions Hercules (1958) and Hercules Unchained (1959), which were both successful at the American box office. The company made films in other genres, such as the science fiction film Caltiki – The Immortal Monster (1959), which enjoyed less financial success. Following the success of the two Hercules films, American distributors were willing to pay in advance for genre films from Italy, even if they were not popular there. Aside from working on both of the Hercules films, cinematographer Mario Bava had partially directed other films without credit, including Caltiki – The Immortal Monster and The Giant of Marathon (1959). This led to Galatea's president, Lionello Santi, offering him the opportunity to make a film for foreign markets.

According to producer Massimo De Rita, an oft-repeated story suggesting that Santi approached Bava to make a film based on a story of his own choosing after being impressed with his work on The Giant of Marathon is apocryphal; De Rita claims that he was responsible for persuading Santi to allow Bava to make a film of his own and that he also begged Santi to increase the film's budget compared to what he felt would allow the film to turn a profit. Due to the recent success of Terence Fisher's version of Dracula for Hammer Film Productions, Bava decided to make a horror film. To compete with Dracula, Santi wanted the film to be shot in Technicolor, but Bava insisted on shooting in black and white; he justified this as both a stylistic and practical choice, as the makeup transformation sequences required special red and green lights that would have made them impossible to film with color. The shooting budget of Black Sunday is unknown. De Rita remembers it being between $50,000 and $60,000, while production manager Armando Govoni recalled the final budget was around $100,000.

=== Writing and pre-production ===
Bava chose to base his project on Nikolai Gogol's "Viy", first published in the 1835 collection Mirgorod. The story concerns a group of students and their encounter with an old witch capable of transforming into a beautiful woman. The witch's death summons the Viy, a gnome chieftain with a face made of iron and eyes that are capable of penetrating spiritual barriers, which are covered by heavy eyelids that droop to the ground. Bava frequently read this story to his children before their bedtime. His first outline of the film, a four-page treatment titled Il Vij, is dated September 1, 1959 and closely follows Gogol's original story. Transposing the story to the present day, it tells the story of a young, married couple who come across a derelict church and encounter an old man who tells them the story of a centurion's daughter who would take the form of a witch by night to harass a philosopher, who eventually beat her to death. The undead witch then called upon the Viy to scare the philosopher's soul from his body. Upon the story's end, it is revealed that the couple are reincarnations of the philosopher and the witch, who declares that she will haunt him forever.

Santi deemed Bava's treatment unsatisfactory and hired Galatea's top screenwriter Ennio De Concini, who had co-written both of the Hercules films and The Giant of Marathon, to help the director turn the concept into a workable screenplay. Many of the film's themes bear similarity to De Concini's sword-and-sandal films, including the tarnishing of holy places, the collapse of a decadent sovereign entity, and the casting of one actress in dual roles symbolizing good and evil, as was the case for Silvana Mangano in Ulysses (1954). According to Sergio Leone, De Concini "was far better at improvising stories, live, in front of producers, then writing them down"; this, coupled with his highly prolific resume, has led Bava biographer Tim Lucas to believe that while De Concini contributed many ideas to what would become Black Sunday, he did little of the actual scripting, which Lucas attributes to Marcello Coscia, who co-wrote Bava's early science fiction film The Day the Sky Exploded (1958).

The film's credits list only De Concini and the film's editor, Mario Serandrei, as the screenwriters; official papers archived at the Centro Sperimentale di Cinematografia (CSC) library in Rome credit Bava, Serandrei, De Concini and Coscia, as well as Dino De Palma. Other papers also credit Fede Arnaud, Domenico Bernabei, Walter Bedogni, Lucia Torelli and Maria Nota. Bava later noted that, "Such was the genius of the screenwriters, myself included, that absolutely nothing remained of Gogol's tale." The references to "Viy" in the resulting film are mostly superficial: the film's characters Andrej Gorobec, Choma Kruvajan, and Javutich are named after the story's characters Gorobets, Khoma Brut, and Yavtukh, while the village of Mirgorod shares its name with the collection Gogol's tale appeared in. A ruined chapel is prominently featured in both works, as is the transformation of a witch into a beautiful young woman; the bronze "Mask of Satan" hammered onto Asa and Javutich's faces is a possible reference to the Viy's iron face and eyelids.

During the scripting phase, the film's title was changed from Il Viy to La maschera del demonio to capitalize on the success of two other horror films — House of Wax (1953) (released in Italy as La maschera di cera) and The Curse of Frankenstein (1957) (La maschera di Frankenstein). The Ministerial Commission of Revision, through which all Italian film scripts were required to be submitted for review, remarked that Black Sunday's script "is so stuffed with witches, vampires, skeletons, ghosts, with its complement of murders and dead bodies, that [Fisher's Dracula] looks like a children's show when compared to it."

Bava drew extensive storyboards from the film, during which he developed the film's visual style based on his earlier works as cinematographer and co-director. Lucas notes that the film features a recurring motif related to eyes and sight, as well as the impairment of both, such as the subjective shot of Asa looking at the spikes of the "Mask of Satan" as it is brought towards her, Andrej falling for Katia at first sight, as well as Kruvajan being staked through the eye; it also features a circularity in its choice of first and last images, as both are of flames that are to be used to put Asa to death. Drawing on both of the films that he had co-directed with Riccardo Freda, I Vampiri (1957) and Caltiki, Bava used Black Sunday to develop his frequent use of backstories to expand the scope of his films beyond their narrative and budgetary constraints; in this case, the death of another of Asa's lookalike descendants, Masha, is used to highlight the power Asa continues to hold over the family even prior to her resurrection. As storyboarded, the hammering of the "Mask of Satan" was originally supposed to include a shot of the nails of the mask piercing through the wood of the stake Asa is tied to, amplifying the violence of the scene.

=== Casting ===
Bava felt that Black Sunday needed a British cast to convince the audience that they would be watching a film as strong as Dracula. Barbara Steele was cast in the dual role of Asa and Katia Vajda. She had appeared in several films for The Rank Organisation, including Bachelor of Hearts (1958), Sapphire and Upstairs and Downstairs (both 1959), before Rank sold her contract to 20th Century Fox. Steele seldom worked in the United States: she was cast opposite Elvis Presley in the Western Flaming Star, but a falling-out with director Don Siegel led to her being replaced during the first week of shooting by Barbara Eden. After a Screen Actors Guild strike in March 1960 left her free to pursue her own interests, she traveled to Italy, leading to her casting in Black Sunday. There are two accounts describing how Steele came to be cast in the film: one suggests that Bava, while perusing through head shots of British actors under contract at Fox, selected Steele from these photos. Steele, however, recalled that Bava tracked her down after being captivated by photos of her in a Life magazine photoshoot. Bava later commented that Steele "had the perfect face for my films".

John Richardson was cast as Katia's love interest Andrej. A colleague of Steele who had appeared in Sapphire and Bachelor of Hearts, Richardson's Rank contract was similarly sold to Fox and he had come to Italy searching for film work; by this time, both he and Steele were represented by the same agent from William Morris Endeavor. Among the Italian cast members was Andrea Checchi, who had previously worked in various Italian productions including Michelangelo Antonioni's The Lady Without Camelias (1953). Checci later appeared in two other films in 1960: Vittorio De Sica's Two Women and Fritz Lang's The Thousand Eyes of Dr. Mabuse. Arturo Dominici, who previously appeared as Eurysteus in Hercules and as Nieto in Caltiki, played the role of Javutich; his daughter Germana also portrayed Sonya, the innkeeper's daughter.

Ivo Garrani, who portrayed Prince Vajda, was a veteran of earlier films photographed by Bava; the actor reflected that his friend's on-set behavior changed little in his transition to directing full-time "because Mario was already a director. He had proven this in the movies we had made together before, since he always found himself directing and saving other people's movies. So it was just a natural thing to see him in the director's chair at last. But Mario was also very shy; he always tended to undervalue himself. You could never pay him a compliment. He would always say, 'C'mon Ivo, what the hell are you saying? Be serious. But he was unique, and we all knew it".

=== Filming ===
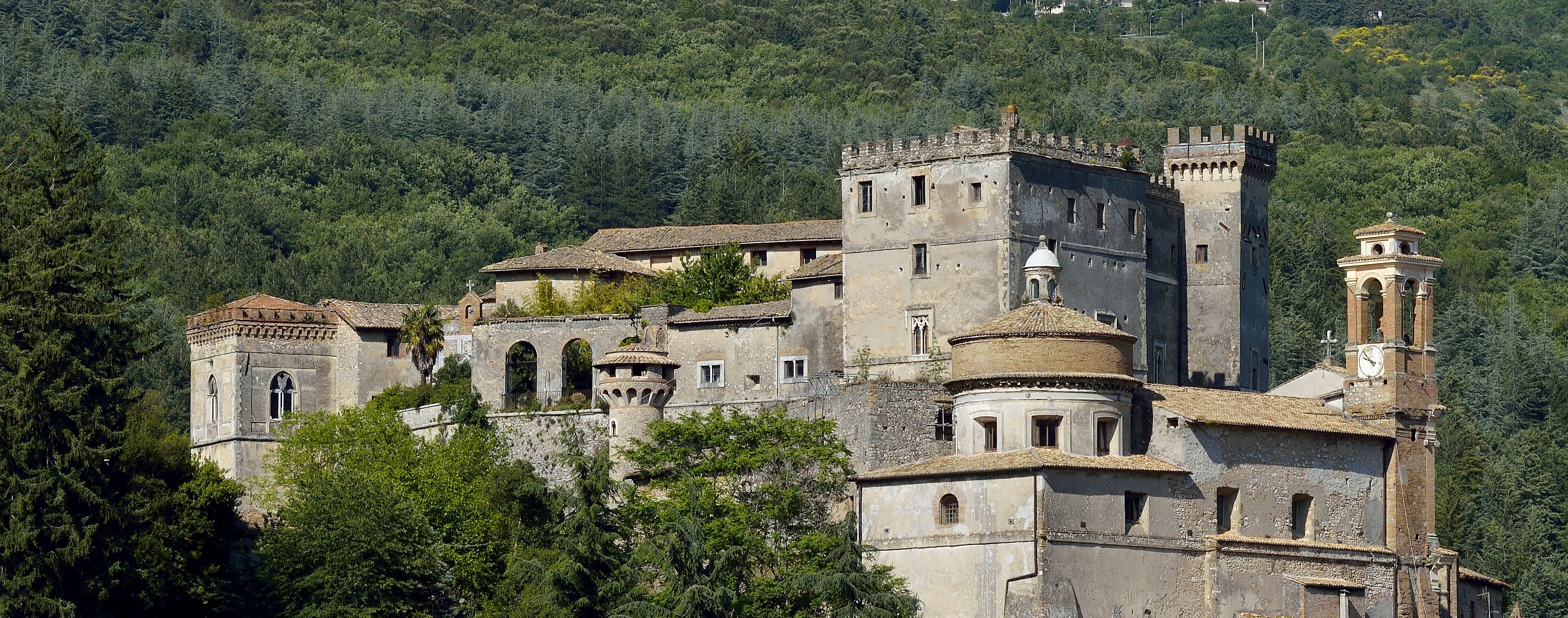
Black Sunday was shot partially at Castle Massimo in Arsoli.

Lord alone knows I was difficult enough. I didn't like my fangs — I had them changed three times. I loathed my wig — I changed that four times. I couldn't understand Italian. I didn't want to play a Chopin waltz. I certainly didn't want them to tear open my dress and expose my breasts, so they got a double that I didn't like at all, so I ended up doing it anyway — drunk, barely over 18, embarrassed and not very easy to be around.

— Barbara Steele on her on-set behavior during the shooting of the film

According to Lucas, principal photography for Black Sunday lasted approximately six weeks — an average schedule for a Galatea production, but longer than the three to four weeks normally allotted to Italian films of the time — beginning on March 28, 1960, and ending on May 7. Meanwhile, film historian and critic Roberto Curti has stated that shooting began in June, and ran for seven weeks. Most of the film was shot at the studios of Scalera Film, with exteriors and some interiors shot at Castle Massimo in Arsoli. Despite the film being shot in black and white, Bava permitted numerous production and publicity stills to be photographed in color; these stills are representative of the lighting choices Bava and his crew made for the film, and were not arranged to accommodate the still photographer.

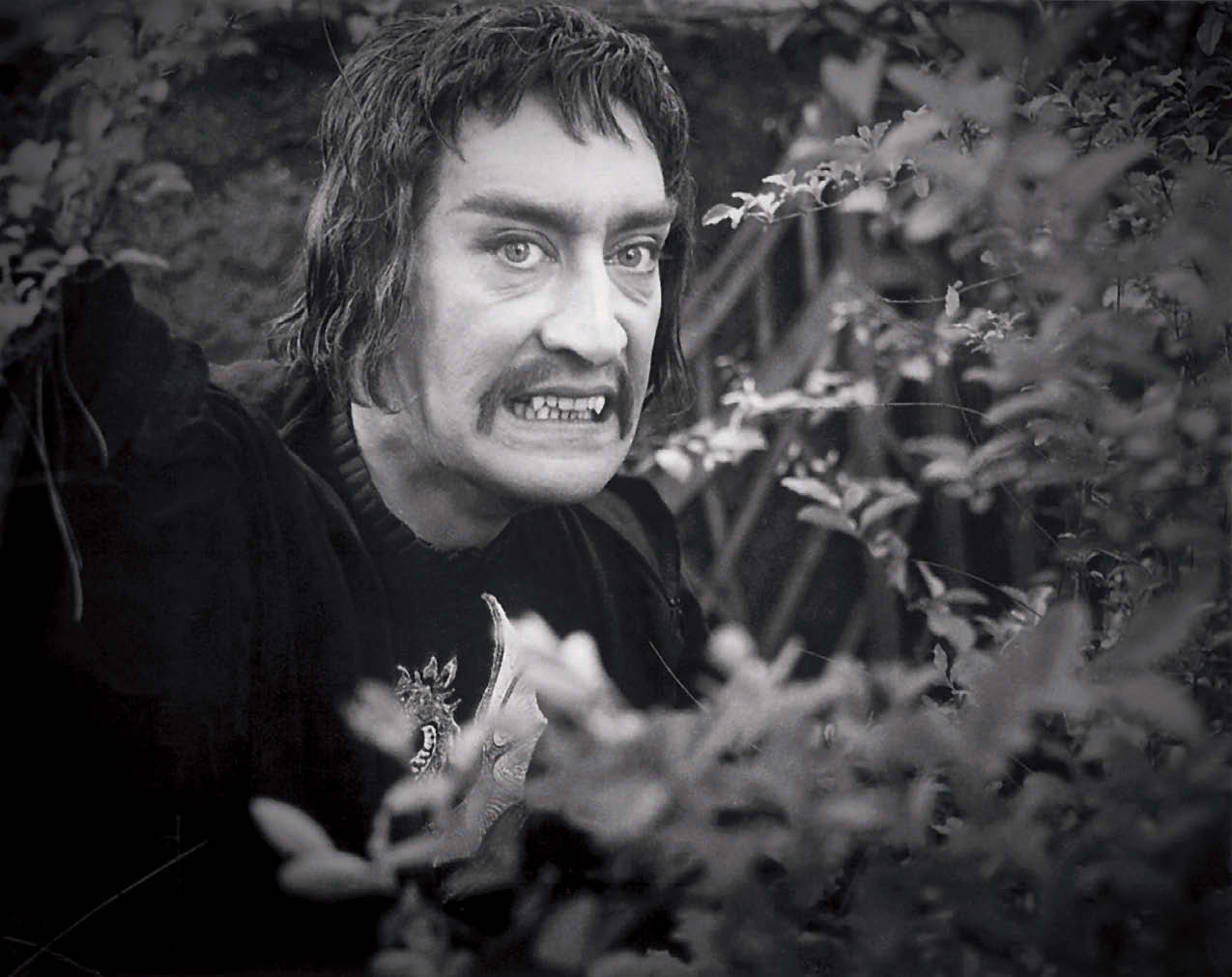
Arturo Dominici in a promotional photograph as Javutich, wearing fangs that are not seen in the film.

Govoni recalled the shoot to be a "very tiring" experience characterized by long work hours. Lucas believes that this was partially the result of the film entering production prematurely, without a thorough revision of the script or consideration for certain filming logistics, prompting Bava to rely on his instincts and improvise; this is evident in Asa and Javutich being variously described or portrayed throughout the film as witches, Satanists and/or vampires. Steele and Dominici were initially outfitted with prop fangs which do not appear in the final film: Bava recalled that he eventually asked the actors to discard them due to their clichéd appearance, while Govoni stated that the fangs were kept during the shoot, but "Serandrei cut around them" during editing. Most of the cast delivered their dialogue in English, with the exception of Checchi and the Dominicis; Govoni recalled that while the translation of the original Italian text the cast was given to work with was crude, they mostly stuck to it. (Note: The completeness of the film's shooting script is unclear: while Govoni claimed to have read a complete, Italian-language draft of the script prior to its English translation, Steele has stated that the actors were not given their script pages until prior to shooting a scene, furthering Lucas' hypothesis that much of the film was improvised or frequently rewritten throughout filming. Curti has noted that a complete, English-translated copy of the script was among the documents related to the film to be archived at the CSC library.)

Throughout the shoot, Steele proved to be difficult to work with; Govoni later described her as a "strange, neurotic person" and Bava proclaimed that "Steele was half-crazy, afraid of Italians." The actress frequently missed her call times or refused to arrive on-set due to misunderstandings: one instance of the former resulted in Arturo Dominici fainting under his costume while the crew waited for her arrival, prompting the actor to angrily tell Bava, "Who does she think she is? Marilyn Monroe?". (Note: This occurred during the shooting of the scene in which Javutich is willed to life by Asa and rises from his grave; the crew was not aware of Dominici's disposition until he failed to surface on cue. After saving him from possible suffocation, Bava restaged the shot to ensure Dominici's safety by filming his hand scrabbling over a mound of earth at a low angle. While working on the restaging, Bava amused the crew by demonstrating a variety of comical ways in which the shot could have played out.) An example of the latter was due to her belief in a rumor that Bava had invented a special film stock that made its subjects appear nude. Critic and editor Martyn Conterio considers many of Steele's recollections of the film's production to be unreliable. This includes her claim that the film was shot in winter, and that everyone on set had worn black and white costumes, neither of which are true. Steele admitted to her misbehavior during the film's shoot later in life and noted that towards the end of the shoot, she and Richardson were prone to nervous fits of laughter due to the stress they had accumulated over the course of filming.

Although Bava is credited as the film's cinematographer, Govoni stated that camera operator Ubaldo Terzano was the actual director of photography, and insisted he had lit the sets "so perfectly that Bava seldom had to correct him". Lucas concurs on this point, noting that while Bava would provide storyboards and occasionally adjust lights and lenses, Terzano was largely in control of which takes would be printed.

The final week of the shooting schedule was reserved for special effects work and tracking shots, for which Bava was able to use a dolly in one of the few occasions of his directorial career. In a scene in which Javutich appears to float towards Prince Vajda, Dominici was shot in close-up as he was pulled along by another, makeshift dolly. A later scene where Katia and Constantine look over their dead father's face employs a 180° pivot which was accomplished using a specially-customized camera with modifications by Bava's father, Eugenio, which included a rear system of radiating handlebars capable of spinning the camera on its axis. Its movement was so imperceptible that Garrani believed that the pivot was achieved through editing.

==== Props and special effects ====
Eugenio Bava developed several of the practical effects used in the film. These included an articulated wax head with a mechanized interior, used to represent Prince Vajda's head as it is being burned in a fireplace, and a foam latex mask of Asa's face, which he made based on photos of Steele without having to make a lifecast. To create the illusion of Asa's eyes regenerating within the sockets, a section of the character's tomb was built containing a hollow area under the mask, into which tomato soup and rice were used to simulate blood and maggots. These were then substituted with poached eggs, representing the eyes. Eugenio also designed the "Mask of Satan" used in the film. Two versions of each mask were made — one cast in bronze and another being a rubber substitute to be used when worn by the actors. Mario Bava recalled that after the film's release he had received several offers for the mask.

Most of the scenes depicting horse carriage rides were shot at Scalera. Due to the small size of the sound stage being used, forests were suggested by filming with glass matte paintings painted with black streaks and augmented with pieces of dead wood and foregrounded bracken. Smoke was filtered through the studio to disguise a cyclorama. These were edited with actual exteriors shot near Castle Massimo to lend credibility to them; because the exteriors were shot day for night, Bava camouflaged the sunlight through dead trees placed in the foreground. When Steele was required to play both Asa and Katia within the same frame, the footage was double-exposed and matted over the jagged edge of Asa's tomb. Other examples of Bava's matte work in the film include an exterior shot of Castle Vajda as a window is illuminated by the moon, and a subjective shot of the pit of spikes over which Andrej and Javutich fight. When Javutich appears to materialize in front of Constantine, Dominici stood off-camera, and his reflection was bounced off a mirror onto a black section of Asa's painting.

The scene in which Asa touches Katia and drains her youth reprised an effect Bava had previously employed on I Vampiri. Wrinkles were drawn on Steele's face with red grease pencil, while rouge was applied around her eyes and on her cheeks to make them appear sullen. These were made to initially appear invisible under red lighting, but became more prominent as green lights were gradually raised in their place. The explosion of Asa's tomb was a miniature effect; pieces of the lid were pulled away by fine wires to reveal a doll of Asa inside.

=== Post-production ===
==== Editing and score ====
Because Serandrei rarely worked as a writer, Lucas has suggested that his screenplay credit for Black Sunday indicates that his responsibilities went beyond cutting scenes together and that he helped Bava correct narrative flaws in post-production. Serandrei's assembly still contains a notable structural flaw — that Asa appears to be powerful enough to destroy her tomb and return Javutich to life, yet remains confined to the tomb even after draining Kruvajan's blood — as well as scenes that exhibit Bava's frequent re-working of the material. These include Katia's irascible dismissal of Sonya's claim that Javutich might be alive, her flirtatious invitation to Andrej to stay in the castle, and her seeing Javutich's reflection while undressing. Lucas believes that these scenes suggest that Javutich was originally intended to kidnap Katia soon after his resurrection, leaving Asa to impersonate her descendant.

An English-dubbed version of the film created for international export, titled The Mask of Satan, was translated from the Italian-language script, directed by George Higgins III and recorded in Rome with the English Language Dubbers Association (ELDA). A scene present in early Italian-language prints was deleted from this version of the film. Depicting a conversation between Katia and Prince Vajda, during which her father notices her melancholy behavior and suggests that the family leave the castle, it was originally intended to take place following her first encounter with Andrej and Kruvajan but was dropped due to the power of the Prince's terrified introduction in a later scene in which Katia plays a piano. The sequence was crudely inserted between Sonya's milking of a cow and Javutich's resurrection without Bava or Serandrei's approval.

The music for the Italian and ELDA versions of Black Sunday was composed by Roberto Nicolosi and conduced by Pier Luigi Urbini. Lucas notes that both versions used the score sparingly, leaving the creation of much of the soundscape to the sound editor, although key dramatic scenes, such as the climactic fight between Andrej and Javutich, play with no music at all, suggesting the difficulties of creating music for a film in a genre that was in its infancy in Italy. He deems much of the score to be derivative of James Bernard's work on Dracula, but singles out the romantic "Katia's Theme" motif for praise.

==== AIP acquisition and re-editing ====
Samuel Z. Arkoff and James H. Nicholson of American International Pictures (AIP) had been buying the American distribution rights to Italian films since 1959. In 1960, the two were invited to Rome by their Italian talent agent, Fulvio Lucisano, to view Black Sunday. Arkoff spoke about this screening in 1997, saying that because they were viewing the Italian version of the film, an interpreter and Lucisano helped to guide them through the plot. Arkoff found the film to be a "picture of a first class horror and suspense director", and was introduced to Bava after the screening, congratulating him. AIP acquired the film for approximately $100,000, recovering its production budget.

For the film's release in the United States, AIP re-edited scenes, re-dubbed the soundtrack, and changed several of the characters' names. Arkoff deemed the ELDA version of the film to be "technically unacceptable", and had Lou Rusoff produce a new English version at Titra Studios in New York City, which was directed by Lee Kresel and edited by Salvatore Billitteri. In contrast to the embellishments of the ELDA version, Titra's dubbing was largely faithful to the cast's spoken dialogue, although some phrases were softened, such as Asa's line "You too can find the joy and happiness in Hades!" which became "You too can find the joy and happiness in hating!". AIP removed or shortened the more violent and sexual scenes in the film, including the hammering of the "Mask of Satan" onto Asa's face, the scene in which she kisses Kruvajan to drain his blood, and the priest's staking of Kruvajan's eye. Arkoff reasoned that, "All of AIP's films were very clean, so anything that was suggestive of playing around - fornicating a corpse, you know what I'm saying? - we wouldn't stand for it." A dialogue exchange between Katia and Andrej that serves to develop their romantic relationship, as well as a climactic exchange between Andrej and the priest in which the former melodramatically laments Katia's apparent death, were also cut, as AIP believed that the juvenile audiences it was targeting would react negatively to these scenes. AIP's editing reduced the film's runtime to 83 minutes, compared to the 87 minute runtime of most Italian prints.

Nicolosi's score was replaced with a new one by Les Baxter. Arkoff and Nicholas felt Nicolosi's score was "too Italian" and that American audiences would not like it. Baxter flew to New York City on January 9, 1961, to record the new soundtrack for the film at Titra. Lucas considers the re-score to be a major factor in the success of the American version, noting, "Baxter's score is everything Nicolosi's score is not: boisterous, unsubtle, boldly orchestrated, incessantly busy — musically underlining every footfall, every droplet of dripping blood [...] every smoking undulation of dry ice". Baxter's score incorporates Nicolosi's "Katia's Theme" at several points, although a piano version of the theme representing a piece played by Katia that suggests her mutual feelings for Andrej was re-scored with a dirge that more closely follows Steele's hand movements on the instrument. He also adapted "Katia's Theme" for the title song of his 1961 exotica album Jewels of the Sea.

== Release ==
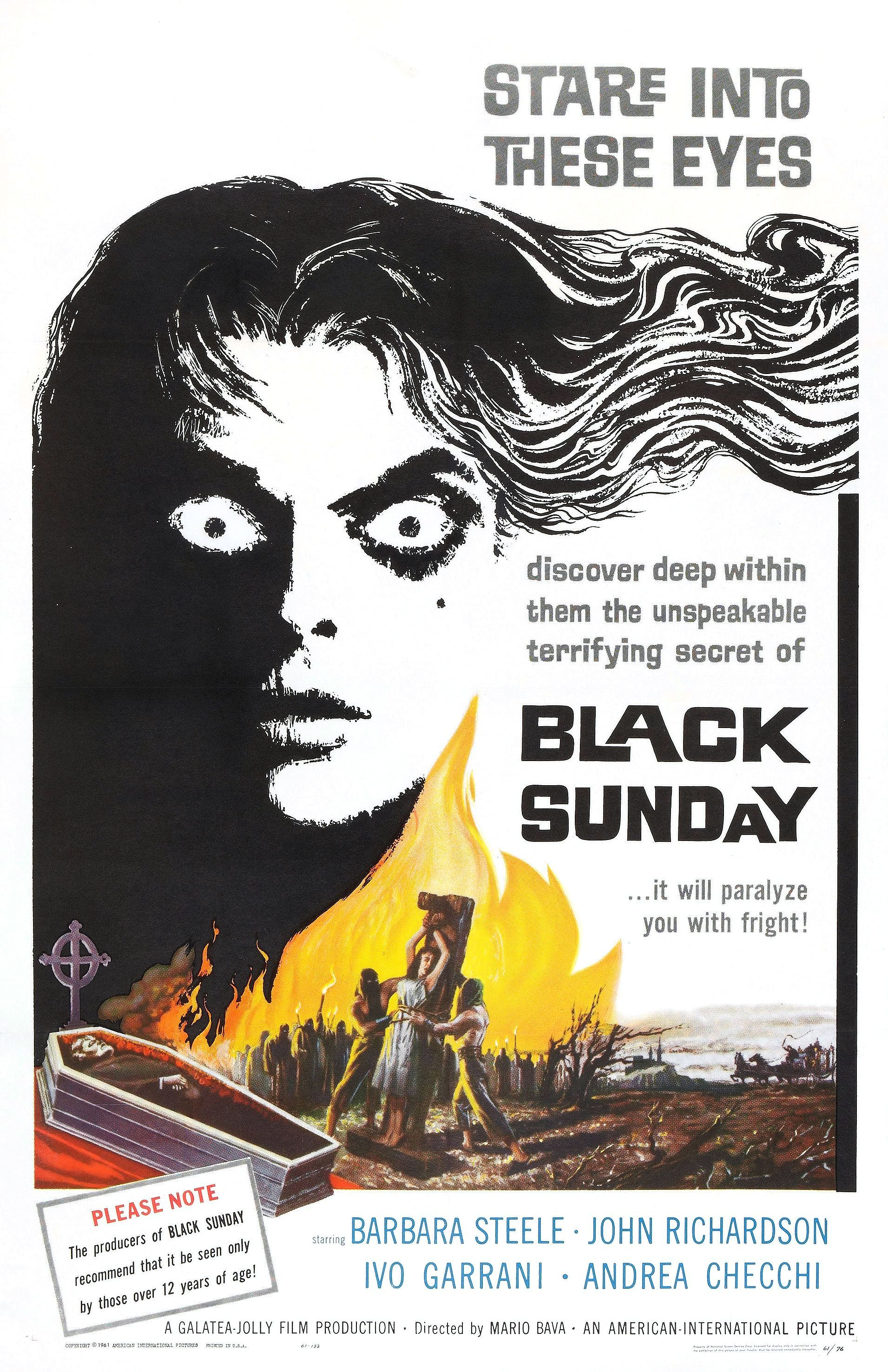
Theatrical poster for the film's US release by Reynold Brown.

After being passed uncut by the Board of Censors, Black Sunday was theatrically released in Italy as La maschera del demonio on August 11, 1960, where it was distributed by Unidis. The film grossed 139 million Italian lira from its domestic release. While Curti has described this financial performance as "rather limited", the film quickly turned Steele into a movie star within Italy. Its popularity influenced other Italian films, such as I motorizzati (1962), where Ugo Tognazzi plays an impressionable horror fan who is terrified of Black Sunday. In France, the film was released that same year as Les masque du démon by Comptoir Français du Film.

Before its release in the United States, AIP considered renaming the film Witchcraft, The Curse or Vengeance, before settling on Black Sunday. AIP premiered the film at the Allen Theatre in Cleveland, Ohio, on February 3, 1961. In its initial release, Black Sunday was a double feature with films from smaller independent companies, such as the British comedy Carry On Nurse (1959) or Roger Corman's The Little Shop of Horrors (1960). Black Sunday grossed $14,750 in its first week at the Allen Theatre, which topped AIP's previous record holders by 35%. The film also performed well in San Francisco and Salt Lake City, making it AIP's highest-grossing film in its five-year history, and generated domestic rentals of $706,000.

Black Sunday was initially banned in the United Kingdom, receiving a single screening at the National Film Theatre in 1961. It did not receive a wide release until June 1968 as Revenge of the Vampire, a censored version of the ELDA dub, which was released by Border Films. The film was not released uncut in the United Kingdom until 1992.

=== Home media and television ===
The first official home video release of the AIP version of Black Sunday was on LaserDisc in 1991. The Italian owners of the film released it in Japan through Toshiba Video and in the United Kingdom through Redemption Video on VHS. Image Entertainment released it on VHS and DVD for the first time in the United States in 1999. Both the Italian/ELDA and AIP versions were released on Blu-ray in the United States by Kino Lorber in 2012 and 2015, respectively. In the United Kingdom, Arrow Video released both cuts alongside the Italian version of I Vampiri on a single Blu-ray in 2013.

Under license from music publisher Creazioni Artistiche Musicali, Nicolosi's score was released, alongside his music for The Girl Who Knew Too Much (1963), on CD in the first volume of Digitmovies' Mario Bava Original Soundtracks Anthology in 2005. The score was later released as a limited edition LP record (500 copies) by Spikerot Records on July 5, 2019. A suite from Baxter's score were first made commercially available on a 1980s Bax Records LP of his score for Black Sabbath (1963); this was later edited to form the basis of a separate soundtrack CD first released by Bay Cities in 1992, which was reissued in 1998 alongside Baxter's score for Baron Blood (1972). A CD of the full score, remastered from the original two-track session tapes sourced from MGM's archives, was released in May 2011 by Kritzerland in a limited edition run of 1000 copies.

A unique variant of the ELDA cut of the film was aired as part of a Bava retrospective on TCM in October 2002. This version, copyrighted in 2000, was supervised by Bava associate Alfredo Leone of International Media Films as a means of preventing the film from falling into the public domain; it features new, red-colored credit titles in place of the original credits, a newly-recorded opening narration, and cues from Baxter's score for Baron Blood that play over scenes that originally lacked music. While noting that Leone created this version in the best interests of preserving Bava's work, Lucas has lambasted it as a "cacophonous, tone-deaf mess".

== Reception ==
=== Initial reception ===
Curti stated that contemporary Italian film critics "ravaged" Black Sunday, although some noted its cinematography. In France, Fereydoun Hoveida of Cahiers du Cinéma praised the film for the extreme mobility of its camera movements, and the way Bava's visual style created a fantastical and poetic dimension; he declared Bava to be an immediate film auteur with "the soul of a painter". Jean-Paul Torok of Positif also praised the film; Steele was featured on the cover of the magazine's July 1961 issue. On its release in the United Kingdom, Tom Milne of the Monthly Film Bulletin declared that Black Sunday was "One of Bava's best films, with a fluid visual style and a narrative grip that only weakens towards the end. Some chilling moments of both beauty and terror, he has never surpassed." In his view, the English version of the film was "devastated" by the dubbing, and felt the sound belonged, "not just to a different film, but to a different world from the near-hysterical images on screen".

In the United States reviews reflected on the plot, as well as the film's cinematography. Dorothy Masters of the New York Daily News found the film gruesome, but proclaimed that "whether this is reprehensible is a personal reaction, but there can be no argument on the general effectiveness of special effects and photography." A review in Time declared the film to be "a piece of fine Italian handiwork that atones for its ludicrous lapses with brilliant intuitions of the spectral." Variety proclaimed that "There is sufficient cinematography ingenuity and production flair [...] to keep an audience pleasantly unnerved." Eugene Archer of The New York Times dismissed the film, declaring it "nonsense" and suggesting that was filmed with "no restraint". In his 1967 book The Illustrated History of Horror and Science-Fiction Films, Carlos Clarens declared Black Sunday was the "best of [Mario Bava's] work" while his later work "rejected chiaroscuro in favor of lush Technicolor and developed the directorial of Black Sunday into mannered tricks such as gratuitous abrupt cuts and an unrestrained use of the zoom lens".

=== Retrospective ===
In a retrospective review, Timothy Sullivan wrote in The Penguin Encyclopedia of Horror and the Supernatural (1986) that the film was, "A supremely atmospheric horror film" and was Bava's "first and best directorial job, and the first of the 1960s cycle of Italian Gothic cinema [...] [The film] remains [Bava's] greatest achievement, without a doubt one of the best horror films ever made." Richard Gilliam of AllMovie gave the film a four and a half star rating out of five, opining that with it, Bava created "a visual feast of the strange and forbidden that unleashes an adolescent-like interest in the unreal world" that was "easily among the most influential films of the Italian Gothic horror era".

James Marriott praised the film as the "crowning achievement of Italian gothic horror" where "narrative and characterization (perfunctory at best here) take second place to the magnificent atmospheric visuals", noting that "unlike many of the Italian gothic chillers that followed, some sequences here [...] are genuinely creepy". James Blackford of Sight & Sound reviewed the film in 2013, concluding that, "Italian horror cinema is known for its intense atmosphere, extravagant visual style and gory scenes, and Black Sunday is the film that first pioneered this approach." He also noted the "beautifully composed chiaroscuro cinematography, expressionistic set design and art direction and the grotesquely appealing makeup lend the film a distinct atmosphere; this is cinema at its most grandiose and rich, brimful of high-flown imagery."

The film continues to have a popular fan base among horror fans and filmmakers, and placed in a 1996 poll of the Top 25 Favourite Horror Films of All Time conducted by the British fan magazine Shivers. It appeared in a reader's choice poll conducted by Fangoria of the ten greatest horror films made before 1970, where it tied for number seven with Fisher's Dracula. In the 2010s, Time Out polled authors, directors, actors and critics who had worked in the horror genre to vote for their top horror films; Black Sunday was listed at number 84 on their top 100. On the review aggregator website Rotten Tomatoes, 88% of 24 critics' reviews are positive, with an average rating of 7.5/10. The website's consensus reads: "Mario Bava's official narrative debut is a witchy nightmare steeped in gothic splendor, shot in chiaroscuro black and white and punctuated with startling gore."

== Legacy and influence ==
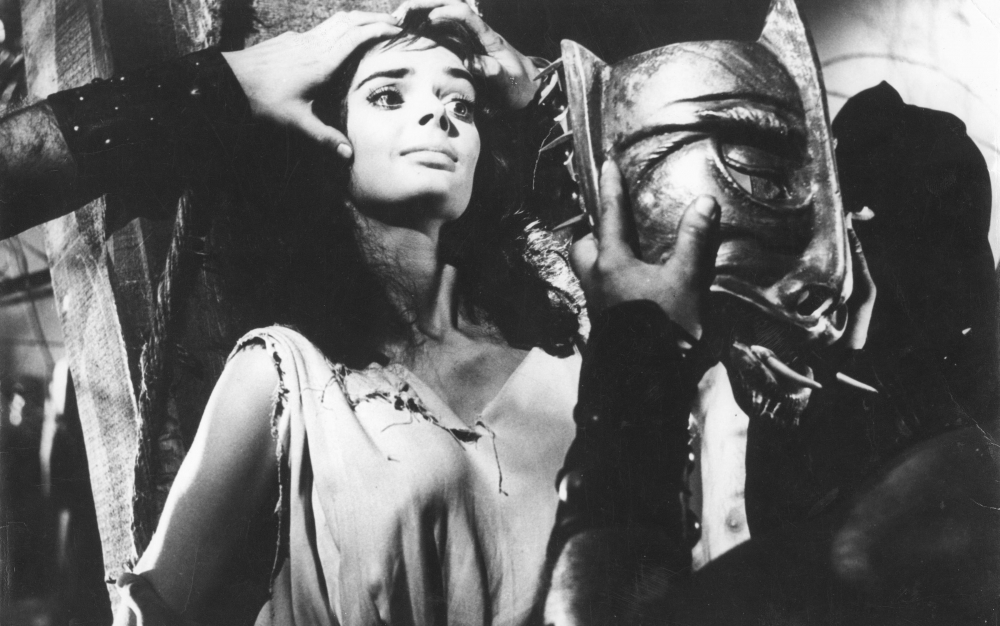
Barbara Steele as Asa in the opening scene of Black Sunday. The sequence's imagery heavily influenced other films, while Steele's performance led to her casting in several horror films throughout the 1960s and 1970s.

Bava's son Lamberto recalls that after Black Sunday was released, producers began asking his father for more genre films. In the late 1960s, producer Lawrence Woolner approached Bava to remake Black Sunday in color; the project never materialized. "Viy" would be adapted for screen again in 1967 with Konstantin Yershow and Georgi Kropachoyov's Viy and later in 1990 as Sveto mesto by Djordje Kadijevic. In 1989, Lamberto Bava directed a made-for-television film also titled La maschera del demonio; this was not a remake of Black Sunday, but an adaptation of Gogol's story in a contemporary setting.

Following the release of Black Sunday, Steele would become what Kim Newman described as an "Italian horror icon", appearing in several horror films, such as Corman's The Pit and the Pendulum (1961), Freda's The Horrible Dr. Hichcock (1962) and The Ghost (1963). Bava asked Steele, through her agents, to portray Nevenka in his film The Whip and the Body; they rejected the offer. When asked about this in 2002, Steele said the invite never reached her, but she would have been very happy to accept it. Steele would appear in more comedies and European art films, such as Federico Fellini's 8½ (1963), later reflecting that, "It was very difficult for me, doing all those horror films at that particular period of my life. The difficult thing is that most directors demand excess in acting. They want a very expressive reaction at all times, which is fine for one take but, put together as a whole, looks a little overboard all the time [...] it's hard for a woman to do that." Steele later said that Black Sunday "was probably the best of that genre of film I've made, but I don't feel it was the best for me as an actress. Frame by frame, it looks so beautiful ... but anybody could have been playing that girl."

The "inquisition"-themed imagery of Black Sunday's opening scene was referenced in multiple horror films throughout the 1960s and beyond, including The Brainiac (1962), Terror in the Crypt (1964), Bloody Pit of Horror (1964), The She Beast (1966), The Blood Demon (1967) and The Haunting of Morella (1990). Tim Burton most prominently used imagery from the film in Sleepy Hollow (1999), such as in the scene where Lisa Marie emerges from an iron maiden with her face punctured akin to Asa. Burton had singled out Bava as a major influence on his work, saying that "One of the movies that remain with me probably stronger than anything is Black Sunday." Burton introduced the film as part of AMC's "Monsterfest" celebration in October 1998.

Black Sunday marked an increase in onscreen violence in film. Prior to Bava's film, Fisher's early Hammer films had attempted to push the envelope; The Curse of Frankenstein relied on make-up to depict the horror of the monster, Dracula had its gorier scenes cut by the British Board of Film Censors, and the violence in the backstory of The Hound of the Baskervilles (1959) was conveyed mostly through narration. The violence in Alfred Hitchcock's Psycho (1960), which was released a week earlier than Black Sunday, was portrayed through suggestion, as its famous "shower scene" made use of fast cutting. Black Sunday, by contrast, depicted violence without suggestion. This level of violence would later be seen in other Italian genre films, such as the Spaghetti Western and the giallo, including Bava's own Blood and Black Lace (1964) and the gialli of Dario Argento and Lucio Fulci. Black Sunday focused on combining eroticism and horror, specifically the eroticism of a tortured body — a trend that other European horror filmmakers like Jean Rollin and Jesús Franco would follow.

== See also ==
- List of cult films
- List of films about witchcraft
