= Roberto Nicolosi =

Italian composer and jazz bandleader (1914–1989)

- Born: 16 November 1914; Genoa, Liguria, Italy
- Died: 4 April 1989 (aged 74) Rome, Lazio, Italy
- Genres: Jazz; film score
- Occupations: Composer; arranger; bandleader; musician
- Instruments: Piano; double bass; violin; guitar; trumpet; vibraphone

Roberto Nicolosi (16 November 1914 – 4 April 1989) was an Italian composer, bandleader, and jazz multi-instrumentalist.

== Life and career ==
Born in Genoa, Nicolosi was originally a practicing dentist before enrolling in the Milan Conservatory. He learned double bass, piano, violin, guitar, trumpet, and vibraphone, and worked extensively as a jazz and pop arranger, including for Kramer Gorni and Aldo Rossi. He led his own ensembles in the 1950s, which included Franco Cerri, Gil Cuppini, Oscar Valdambrini, and Glauco Masetti.

Beginning with 1954's documentary Sesto continente by Folco Quilici, he transitioned to a secondary career writing film scores, mainly of sword-and-sandal films and other historical epics. He gained further prominence in the following decade for his collaborations with horror director Mario Bava.

== Filmography ==
Year	Title	Director	Notes
1954	Sesto continente	Folco Quilici	Documentary
1956	A Woman Alone	Vittorio Sala	
1956	Lo svitato	Carlo Lizzani	
1956	The Violent Patriot	Sergio Grieco	
1957	The Black Devil	Sergio Grieco	
1957	El Alamein	Guido Malatesta	
1957	Manos sucias	José Antonio de la Loma	
1957	The Mighty Crusaders	Carlo Ludovico Bragaglia	
1958	The Warrior and the Slave Girl	Vittorio Cottafavi	
1958	The Pirate of the Black Hawk	Sergio Grieco	
1958	The Sword and the Cross	Carlo Ludovico Bragaglia	
1959	Vite perdute	Adelchi Bianchi; Roberto Mauri	
1959	Non perdiamo la testa	Mario Mattoli	
1959	The White Warrior	Riccardo Freda	
1959	Wild Cats on the Beach	Vittorio Sala	
1959	Caltiki – The Immortal Monster	Riccardo Freda; Mario Bava	
1959	The Giant of Marathon	Jacques Tourneur	
1960	Colossus and the Amazon Queen	Vittorio Sala	
1960	Black Sunday	Mario Bava	
1960	Esther and the King	Raoul Walsh	
1960	Lettere di una novizia	Alberto Lattuada	
1960	Revenge of the Barbarians	Giuseppe Vari	
1961	The Last of the Vikings	Giacomo Gentilomo	
1961	Blood Feud	Damiano Damiani	
1961	Erik the Conqueror	Mario Bava	
1962	Blood on the Balcony	Pasquale Prunas	Documentary
1962	Attack of the Normans	Giuseppe Vari	
1962	Universo di notte	Alessandro Jacovoni	Documentary
1962	I Don Giovanni della Costa Azzurra	Vittorio Sala	
1963	The Reunion	Damiano Damiani	
1963	The Girl Who Knew Too Much	Mario Bava	
1963	Taur, il re della forza bruta	Antonio Leonviola	
1963	Torpedo Bay	Charles Frend; Bruno Vailati	
1963	Thor and the Amazon Women	Antonio Leonviola	
1963	Black Sabbath	Mario Bava	
1963	Canzoni nel mondo	Vittorio Sala	Documentary
1964	Rome Against Rome	Giuseppe Vari	
1964	Il treno del sabato	Vittorio Sala	
1966	Ischia operazione amore	Vittorio Sala	
1966	Gatto Filippo - Licenza di incidere	Daniele D'Anza; Pino Zac	
1972	Eye in the Labyrinth	Mario Caiano	
