= Gérard Herter =

German actor (1920–2007)

- Herter in Adios Sabata (1971).
- Born: Gerhard Haertter; 12 April 1920; Stuttgart, Germany
- Died: 6 February 2007 (aged 86); Munich, Germany
- Occupation: Actor

Gerhard Haertter (12 April 1920 – 6 February 2007), often credited as Gérard Herter, was a German actor known for his work in Italian cinema. He typically played villains, especially Prussian and military types, in Spaghetti Westerns and adventure films of the 1950s and 60s.

== Life and career ==
Herter was born in Stuttgart in 1920. He studied acting at the Munich Kammerspiele and began his career on stage. At some point during the 1950s, he moved to Rome, and made his film debut in the Italian historical adventure film The White Warrior (1959), directed by Riccardo Freda.

That same year, he starred in the sci-fi horror Caltiki - The Immortal Monster, the war comedy The Great War, and the sword-and-sandal film The Giant of Marathon. Herter appeared in over 30 films throughout the next two decades. He became known widely for his roles in Spaghetti Westerns, especially as Baron von Schulenberg in Sergio Sollima's The Big Gundown. He was credited under several variations of his name, including Gerhard Haerter, Gerard Haerther, Gerald Herter, Gerard Herter, and Gerhard Herter.

His last credited film appearance was as Prince Regent Luitpold in Luchino Visconti's biographical period epic Ludwig (1973).

Herter died in Munich at the age of 86, on 6 February 2007.

== Filmography ==
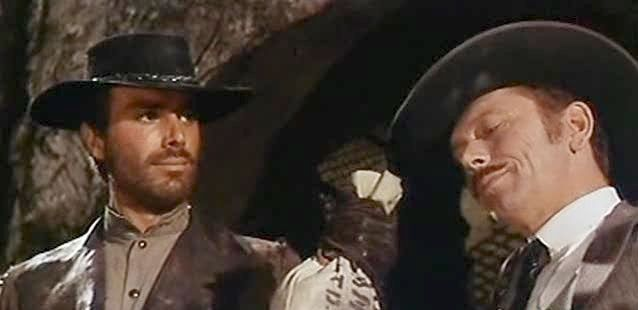
Herter (right) with George Hilton (left) in Any Gun Can Play (1967).

Year	Title	Role	Notes
1959	The White Warrior	Prince Sergei Vorontzov	
1959	Caltiki - The Immortal Monster	Max Gunther	
1959	The Great War	Capitano austriaco	
1959	The Giant of Marathon	Hippia	Uncredited
1960	Five Branded Women	Col. von Elm	
1960	Under Ten Flags	Cap. del Sommergibile	
1961	Garibaldi	Alexandre Dumas	
1961	Then There Were Three	German Colonel	
1961	Ursus in the Valley of the Lions	Lothar	
1962	The Changing of the Guard	German Official	
1963	The Shortest Day	Colonel	
1963	The Two Colonels	German General	
1964	The Road to Fort Alamo	Mr. Silver	Uncredited
1966	Secret Agent Super Dragon	Coleman	
1966	Seven Golden Men Strike Again	Submarine Officer	Uncredited
1966	The Big Gundown	Baron von Schulenberg	
1967	Any Gun Can Play	Lawrence Blackman	
1967	Red Blood, Yellow Gold	Major Lloyd	
1967	Le due facce del dollaro	Col. Blackgrave	
1968	The Devil's Brigade	German Officer in Town	Uncredited
1968	One More to Hell	Ernest Ward	
1968	Gatling Gun	Mr. Bishop	
1969	The Battle of El Alamein	Gen. Schwartz	
1969	Fräulein Doktor	Capt. Munster	
1969	Quella dannata pattuglia	Colonel Kleist	
1969	Battle of the Commandos	SS Lt. Hapke	
1970	A Sword for Brando		
1970	El último día de la guerra	Maj. Skorch	
1970	Angeli senza paradiso	Count Roskoff	
1970	Hornets' Nest	Capt. Kreuger	
1970	Adiós, Sabata	Colonel Skimmel	
1970	Amore formula 2	Karl Müller	
1973	Ludwig	Prince Luitpold	(final film role)

=== Television ===
Year	Title	Role	Notes
1961	Francesco di Assisi	Elias of Cortona	TV movie
1966	Luisa Sanfelice	Vice-Admiral Horatio Nelson	Miniseries; 3 episodes
1968	The Odyssey	Laocoön	Miniseries; 2 episodes
1969	It Takes a Thief	Plummit	Episode: "The Great Casino Caper"
