= Giorgia Moll =

Italian actress (1938–2026)

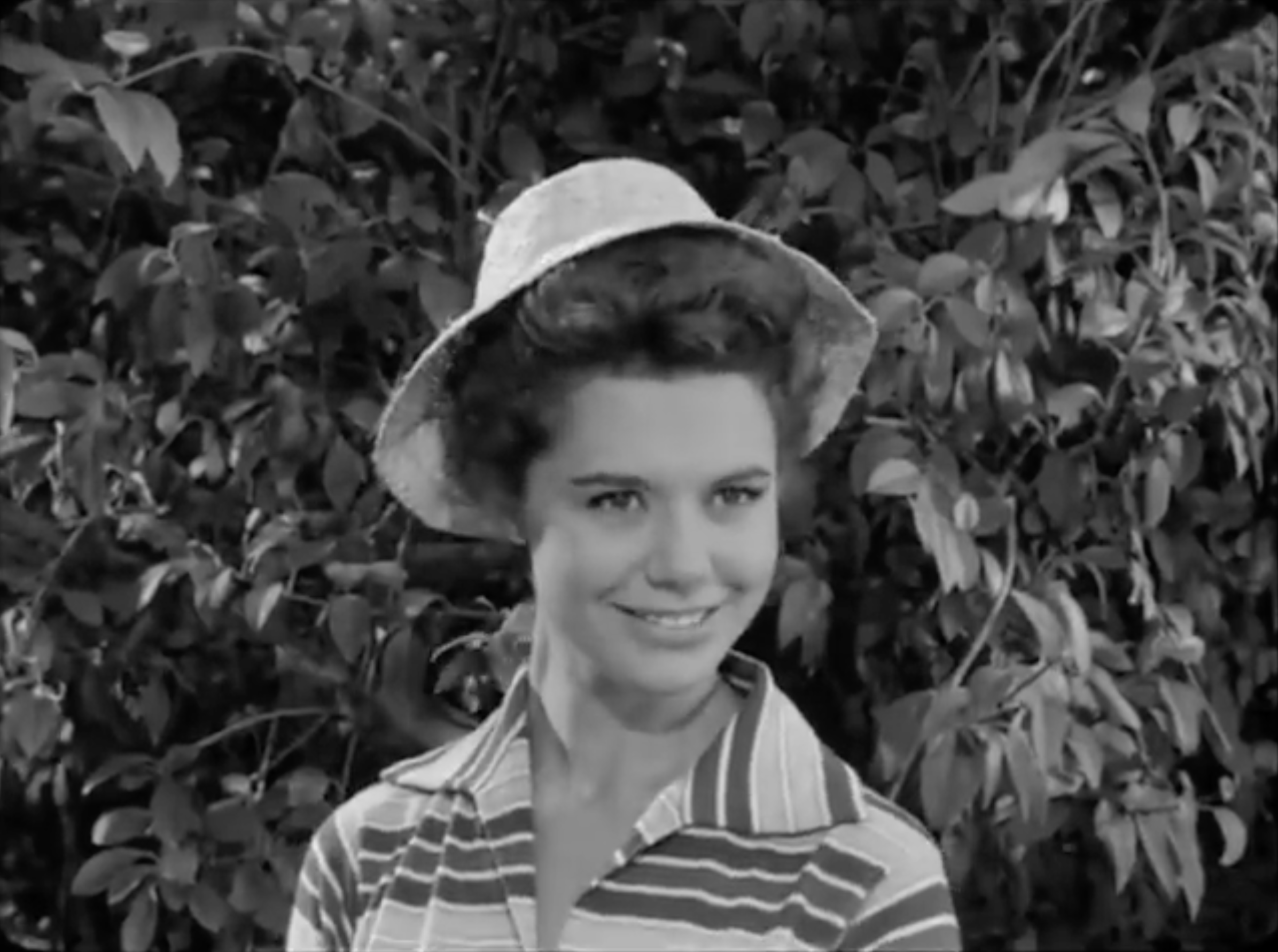
- Moll in Husbands in the City
- Born: 14 January 1938; Prata di Pordenone, Kingdom of Italy
- Died: 2 June 2026 (aged 88); Rome, Italy
- Occupations: Actress, Singer
- Years active: 1955–1985

Giorgia Moll (14 January 1938 – 2 June 2026), sometimes credited as Georgia Moll and Georgia Mool, was an Italian film actress.

== Life and career ==
Born in Prata di Pordenone to a German father and an Italian mother, when she was 16 years old Moll started a career as a model, and in 1955 she won the "Miss Cinema" beauty contest. The following year she started her film career, being mainly active in comedies and adventure films. She was critically appreciated for her dramatic performance in Damiano Damiani's Lipstick (1960). Moll retired from acting in the early 1970s.

Moll died on 2 June 2026, at the age of 88.

== Selected filmography ==
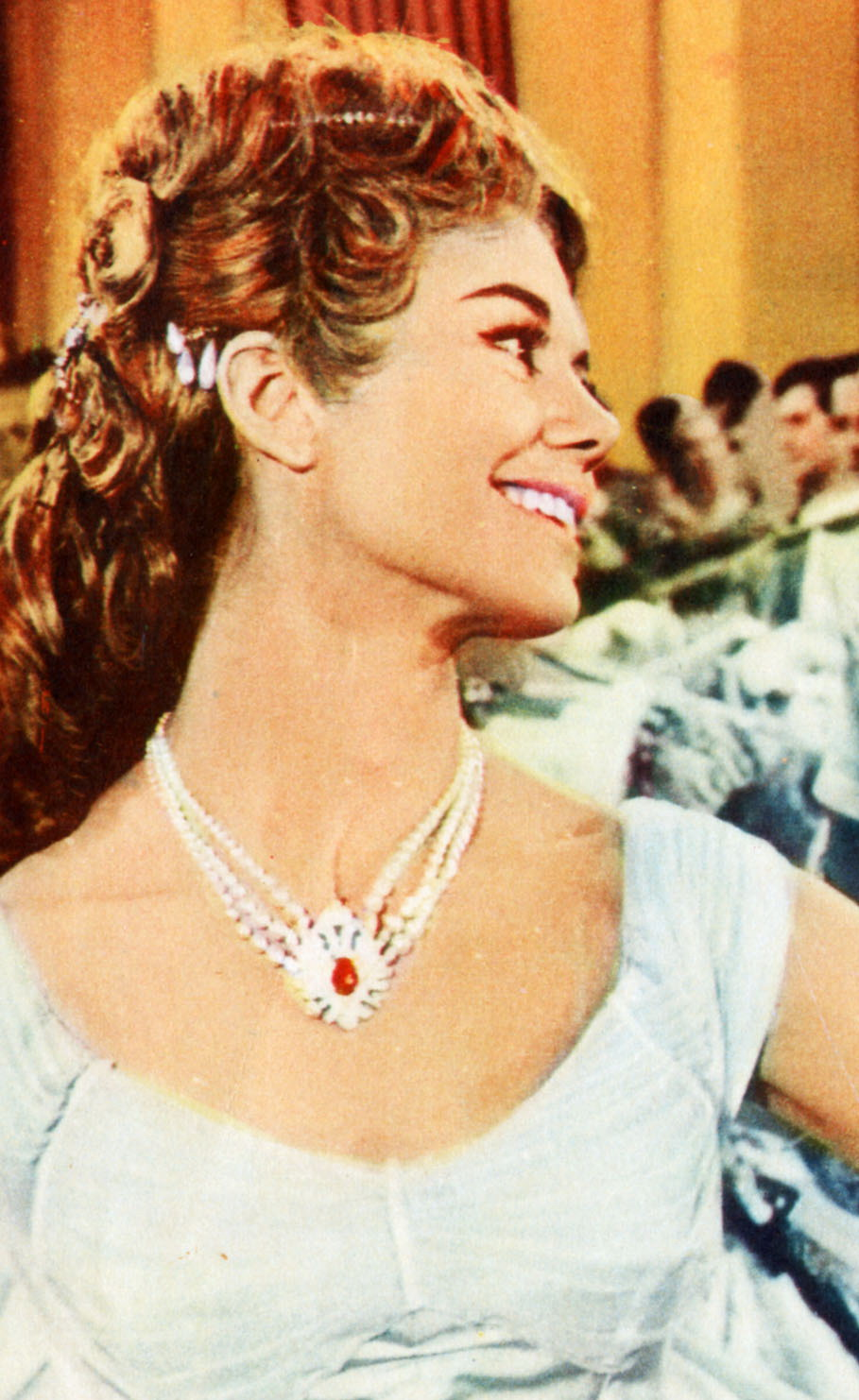
Moll in The Cossacks (1960)

- 1956: Lo svitato by Carlo Lizzani: Elena
- 1956: Nero's Weekend by Steno: Lidia
- 1956: Women's Club by Ralph Habib: Gina
- 1957: Husbands in the City by Luigi Comencini: Lionella
- 1958: Mogli pericolose by Luigi Comencini: Claudina Carpi
- 1958: The Quiet American by Joseph L. Mankiewicz: Phuong
- 1959: Wild Cats on the Beach by Vittorio Sala: Adelina
- 1959: La cambiale by Camillo Mastrocinque: Maria
- 1959: The White Warrior by Riccardo Freda: Saltanet
- 1959: Tunis Top Secret by Bruno Paolinelli: Simone Fredrick
- 1960: The Cossacks by Giorgio Rivalta and Viktor Tourjansky: Tatiana
- 1960: Lipstick by Damiano Damiani: Lorella Severano
- 1960: Colossus and the Amazon Queen by Vittorio Sala: an Amazon
- 1961: The Thief of Bagdad by Arthur Lubin and Bruno Vailati: Amina
- 1961: Romulus and the Sabines by Richard Pottier: Lavinia
- 1963: Contempt by Jean-Luc Godard: Francesca Vanini, assistant producer
- 1963 : Island of Love by Morton DaCosta: Elena Harakas
- 1964: Dark Purpose by George Marshall: Cora Barbarelli
- 1966: Incompreso by Luigi Comencini: Aristocrat's wife
- 1966: The Devil in Love by Ettore Scola
- 1966: Requiem per un agente segreto by Sergio Sollima: Edith
- 1967: The Blonde from Peking by Nicolas Gessner: Jinny
- 1967: Tom Dollar by Marcello Ciorciolini: Samia
- 1967: I barbieri di Sicilia by Marcello Ciorciolini: Helga Von Krauss
- 1968: Captain Singrid by Jean Leduc: Carol
- 1968: Italian Secret Service by Luigi Comencini: The Bird
- 1968: Beyond Control by Helmut Förnbacher: Brigitte
- 1969: Le Voleur de crimes by Nadine Trintignant: Olga
- 1984: Everybody in Jail by Alberto Sordi: Giovanna Salvemini
