= Caltiki – The Immortal Monster =

1959 film

- Italian theatrical release poster
- Italian: Caltiki, il mostro immortale
- Screenplay by: Filippo Sanjust; Riccardo Freda
- Produced by: Nello Santi
- Starring: John Merivale; Didi Sullivan; Gérard Herter; Gail Pearl; Daniele Vargas; Daniela Rocca
- Cinematography: Mario Bava
- Edited by: Mario Serandrei
- Music by: Roberto Nicolosi
- Production companies: Galatea Film; Climax Pictures
- Distributed by: Lux Film
- Release date: 8 August 1959 (Italy)
- Running time: 76 minutes
- Countries: Italy; France
- Language: Italian
- Box office: ₤94.15 million

Caltiki – The Immortal Monster (Italian: Caltiki, il mostro immortale) is a 1959 science-fiction horror film starring John Merivale, Didi Sullivan, Gérard Herter, Daniele Vargas, and Daniela Rocca. It is credited to director Riccardo Freda (under the alias 'Robert Hampton'), though large portions of the film were ghost-directed by cinematographer Mario Bava.

Heavily influenced by The Blob and The Quatermass Xperiment, the film's storyline concerns a team of archaeologists investigating Mayan ruins, who come across a creature that is a shapeless, amorphous blob. They manage to defeat it using fire, while keeping a sample of the creature. Meanwhile, a comet, which previously passed near the Earth around the time of the collapse of the Mayan civilization, is due to return, raising the possibility of a connection between the creature and the comet.

After the success of their film Hercules (1958), Galatea Film began production on films in other genres that they hoped would entice the international market, which led to Riccardo Freda being hired to direct Caltiki – The Immortal Monster. Freda left the project during filming, later explaining that he wanted to give his friend Mario Bava, who had been hired as the film's cinematographer and special effects artist, a chance to direct and earn more on the project. In interviews given long after the release of the film, both Freda and Bava gave conflicting opinions on who should be considered the real director of Caltiki. Various historians and ministerial papers suggest that Bava did create a large amount of footage of the film involving death scenes, the monster, matching shots and special effects scenes.

The film was released in Italy on 8 August 1959, where it grossed less than Bava's and Freda's previous genre collaboration, I Vampiri. Bava followed it with his official directorial debut, Black Sunday, the following year.

== Plot ==
Archaeologist Dr. John Fielding and his friend Max Gunther leads an expedition outside of a large Mayan ruin outside Mexico City, hoping to gain insight on the Mayan collapse. One night, expedition member Nieto stumbles deliriously into his group's camp without his partner, both of whom have been exploring a nearby cave. He quickly goes mad, requiring hospitalization. Their interest piqued by this strange turn of events, the group sets out for the cave.

Once there, they find a deep pool of water and a large statue of Caltiki, a vengeful Mayan goddess who was ceremonially presented with human sacrifices. Hoping to find artifacts, the group sends one of their own down into the pool. At the bottom, he finds a menagerie of skeletons clad in gold jewelry. He comes back up, clutching as much gold as he can carry. Although the others tell him not to go down again, he insists on doing so, suggesting that they could become wealthy from the treasures below. Relenting, they let him descend once more. As he collects more and more treasure, his cable to the surface suddenly begins to move erratically. Fearing for his safety, the group pulls him back to the surface, only to find that his flesh has been reduced to a liquified mass over his skeleton upon removing his face mask.

Moments later, the shapeless creature that attacked him rears up from the pool, attempting to digest anyone within reach. Max tries to grab the treasure and has his arm caught by the creature, only saved in the nick of time by John. As the team escapes, the creature begins to crawl out of the cave. Nearby, there is a tanker truck full of gasoline. John drives the tanker directly into the moving mass, which violently explodes and sets fire to the blob, destroying it.

The team returns to Mexico City to take Max to a hospital. Still on his arm is a small piece of the creature, which is slowly digesting him. The surgeons carefully remove the creature, wrapping it up. After further experimenting on the creature, scientists discover that it is a unicellular bacterium that quickly grows when in the presence of radiation. A comet emitting radiation that crosses Earth's path only once every 850 years is rapidly approaching. At the comet's closest approach to Earth, the remaining piece of the blob removed during the surgery begins reproducing and expanding to an enormous size. Unfortunately, the extracted sample of the creature is stored in John's home.

Meanwhile, Max, who is slowly going mad from his injuries, escapes the hospital and flees to John's house, where he is sheltered in the basement by his former mistress Linda.

While attempting to convince the government to send its army to destroy the reproducing blobs, John is arrested but manages to escape. A colleague finally convinces the authorities to sound an alarm because the multiplying creatures will soon be beyond their control. The government marshals a regiment of soldiers equipped with flamethrowers and jeeps and sends them to John's home.

Upon arrival, they find that the amorphous blobs have continued to multiply and have overrun the house and grounds. Max, in a fit of insanity, tries to attack John's wife Ellen and daughter but is killed by the creature, who also kills Linda. Ellen and the child have hidden on a second-floor window ledge to escape being devoured. John arrives just in time to save them, just as the arrayed soldiers lay waste to the creatures with torrents of fire.

== Cast ==
- John Merivale as Dr. John Fielding
- Didi Sullivan as Ellen Fielding
- Gérard Herter as Max Gunther
- Daniela Rocca as Linda
- Giacomo Rossi-Stuart as Arturo, Prof. Rodriguez's assistant
- Daniele Vargas as Bob, expedition manager
- Vittorio André as Prof. Rodriguez
- Nerio Bernardi as Police Inspector
- Arturo Dominici as Dr. Nieto, expedition member
- Gail Pearl as Dancer

Uncredited

- Tom Felleghy as Astronomer
- Mario Bava as Man in Police Station

Credits from the British Film Institute collections, Italian Gothic Horror Films: 1957–1969, Riccardo Freda: The Life and Works of a Born Filmmaker, and Mario Bava: All the Colors of the Dark.

== Influences ==
In an interview on the film's 2017 Blu-Ray release, critic and film scholar Kim Newman noted the influence of American film The Blob and British film The Quatermass Xperiment. All three films center on an amorphous, blob-like alien monster that grows exponentially by consuming matter, and Quatermass involves a human villain scarred by an encounter with the creature who mutates over the course of the film.

== Production ==
=== Background and development ===
After the release of I Vampiri, director Riccardo Freda took on another new genre, the science fiction film, with his next genre film Caltiki - The Immortal Monster. Very few sound films in Italy were science fiction films at this point, with Sergio Corbucci's comedy film Baracca e burattini made in 1954 and Steno's Totò nella luna and The Day the Sky Exploded from 1958. Caltiki was produced by Nello Santi for Galatea Film, who were interested in exploring new genres of film after the success of Hercules (1957), and produced Caltiki with foreign markets in mind. Although not mentioned in any credits or ministerial papers, European sources list the involvement of the French company Climax Film in the production.

Reasoning that Italian audiences might be more receptive to a genre film if it appeared to be made by American or British creators, Freda took the pseudonym 'Robert Hampton', a name he would use several more times on his horror films. Likewise, several of the other cast members used anglicized aliases ('Arthur Dominick' for Arturo Dominici, 'Black Bernard' for Nerio Bernardi, etc.). Prints of the U.S. version of the film credit it as a "Samuel Schneider presentation", leading to some sources speculating that the film was an Italian-American co-production, though this likewise appears to be a fictious credit for marketing purposes.

=== Director ===
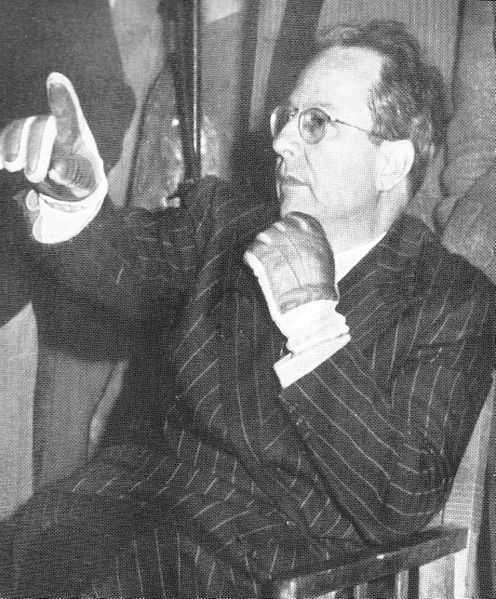
Riccardo Freda

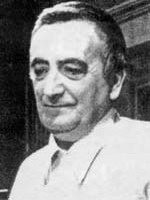
Mario Bava

Both directors gave conflicting reports on who should be considered the official director of Caltiki - The Immortal Monster.

Freda was angered by the way producers and other filmmakers had his cinematographer Mario Bava work on previous films, specifically films of Pietro Francisci. Freda concocted a way to push Bava into the director's chair of Freda's next film, Caltiki – The Immortal Monster; he left the project early. Bava had been hired again as the film's cinematographer, while Filippo Sanjust was hired as the film's screenwriter, having co-written Freda's previous film Beatrice Cenci (1956). Freda also contributed to the script without credit.

Specific information on how much Freda and Bava directed the film differ between interviews and recollections. Freda noted with an interview with Luigi Cozzi in 1971 that he "left it when there were just two days of shooting left. I did shoot it yes, but it's Bava's type of film. I don't enclose it in my body of work. The only thing I remember with pleasure about it are the statues that decorated the sets: I sculpted them myself." Bava described Caltiki – The Immortal Monster as "my very first film", while noting that Freda had fled the set "because everything was falling to pieces. I managed to carry it out, patching it up here and there". Cozzi commented on his interview with Freda in 2004, stating that his own words were misinterpreted and that "the truth is only one: the director of Calitiki il mostro immortale is Riccardo Freda, full stop. Mario Bava did take care of the cinematography, the special effects and directed the scenes with the miniatures (that is, mostly the tanks....), and in addition to that he filmed some shots of soldiers with flame throwers. That's all, and of course it cannot be enough to say that Bava directed that movie." Cozzi also stated that Bava spoke about the film, stating that "I did not direct Caltiki. The director of that movie is Freda. Only at a certain point, after principal shooting ended, Freda started editing the picture and then he had a big argument with the producer [...] Then Freda walked out." Bava's statement from Cozzi then noted that Bava finished some special effects shot, scenes with soldiers with flame throwers for the ending of the film and declared "that does not mean I was the director of Caltiki: that is a Riccardo Freda film." According to Bava's biographer Tim Lucas, Freda's walk-off left "two or three weeks of filming", leaving Bava to shoot over 100 special effects shots for a 76-minute long production.

Massimo De Rita, who worked as a unit manager for Galatea, spent time on the set of Caltiki and opined that "at 90 percent Bava was also the director of Caltiki. Freda was away, he didn't know anything about what Bava was contriving." De Rita noted that Bava told actors what to do and that Bava shot all the connecting shots with the monster and all the death scenes. Ministerial papers also note the Bava and Freda's roles in the film. The final balance in the film assigns Freda 5,000,000 lire, instead of the initial 6,000,000 and that Bava was paid 6.250 million lire, instead of his initial 3,000,000.

== Release ==
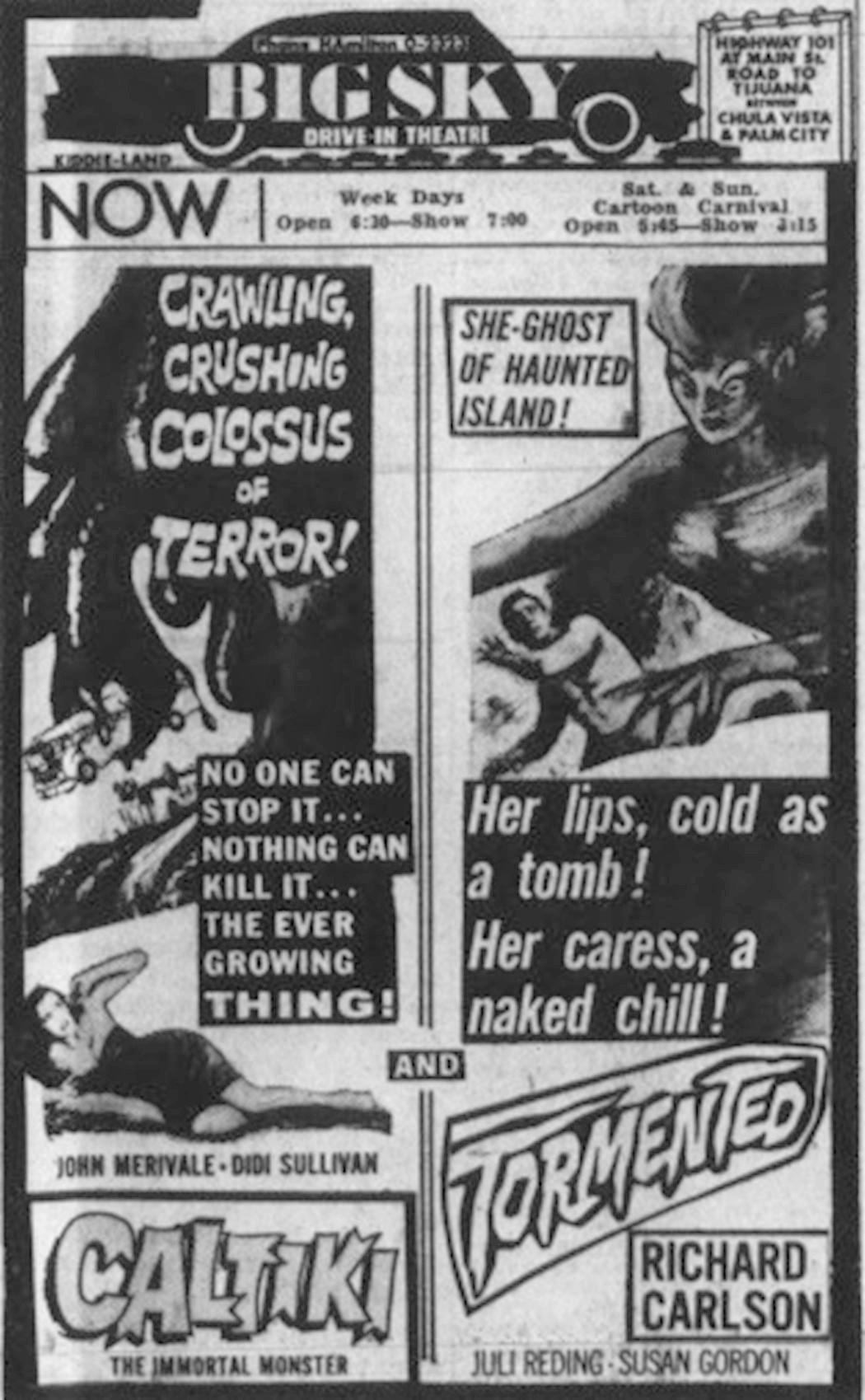
Big Sky Drive-In theater advertisement for the double-feature science-fi/horror films, Caltiki – The Immortal Monster and Tormented, 10 November 1960.

Caltiki - The Immortal Monster was released theatrically in Italy on 8 August 1959 where it was distributed by Lux Film. In Italy the film was less successful than Freda's and Bava's film I Vampiri, which had grossed ₤125.3 million Italian lire. Caltiki grossed a total of 94.15 million lire domestically.

The film was distributed theatrically in the U.S. in September 1960 by Allied Artists as Caltiki – The Immortal Monster. The English-language dub of the film was created in New York by Titra Studios, which dubbed many Italian films from this period. It was released in the U.K. in 1962.

=== Home media ===
Caltiki - The Immortal Monster was published as a photonovel in the magazine I Vostri Film in the 1 July 1962 issue. The film was released on DVD and Blu-ray by Arrow Video on 11 April 2017. Arrow's release features both Italian and English audio tracks, two separate audio commentaries by Bava historians Tim Lucas and Troy Howarth, an interview with critic Kim Newman about the film's place in the history of monster films, several archival featurettes, and an alternative "full aperture" presentation of the film that contains more visual information than was present in the original theatrical prints, particularly with regard to Bava's visual effects shots.

== Critical reception ==
From contemporary reviews, The Monthly Film Bulletin commented that "phony sets, bad acting and limitations of a small budget seriously hamper the first half" and that "once the monster asserts itself things begin to liven up." The review concluded that the film was "so incredibly banal that it almost entertains." Wanada Hale of the New York Daily News referred to Caltiki as a "feeble horror film" and that "Not only the story is bad; so are the production, the direction, the dubbing and the acting".

Among retrospective reviews, Bruce Eder of AllMovie gave the film a generally positive review, calling it "a neat and compelling science fiction-horror amalgam, squeezing cosmology together with archaeology and myth to create a genuinely fascinating and original thriller." In Phil Hardy's book Science Fiction (1984), a review described the film as a "minor outing [...] though the acting is routine and the script leaden, Bava injects a few stylish flourishes." Slant Magazine stated that the film "remains an impressive showcase for Bava's inimitable skills behind the camera, in particular his uncanny ability to craft moody atmosphere and some extremely grisly imagery (for 1959, anyhow) out of the simplest and most frugal of cinematic means."

== See also ==
- List of Italian films of 1959
- List of horror films of the 1950s
- List of science fiction films of the 1950s
