= Colossus and the Amazon Queen =

1960 film

- Directed by: Vittorio Sala
- Screenplay by: Ennio De Concini; Fulvio Fo; Augusto Frassinetti; Giorgio Mordini; Vittorio Nino; Novarese; Vittorio Sala
- Produced by: Paolo Moffa
- Starring: Rod Taylor; Ed Fury; Dorian Gray; Daniela Rocca
- Cinematography: Bitto Albertini
- Edited by: Mario Serandrei
- Music by: Roberto Nicolosi
- Production companies: Galatea Film; Glomer Film; Alta Vista
- Release date: 8 September 1960 (Italy)
- Running time: 98 minutes
- Country: Italy

Colossus and the Amazon Queen (Italian: La regina delle Amazzoni/ Queen of the Amazons) is a 1960 Italian sword and sandal comedy film directed by Vittorio Sala.

== Cast ==
- Rod Taylor as Pirro
- Ed Fury as Glauco
- Dorian Gray as Antiope
- Daniela Rocca as Melitta
- Gianna Maria Canale as La Regina
- Alberto Farnese as Losco - Il pirata
- Giorgia Moll as Amazone
- Folco Lulli
- Ignazio Leone as Sopho
- Adriana Facchetti as Sacerdota
- Paola Falchi as Amazone
- Enzo Cerusico as Menandro
- Marco Tulli as Eumeo - Oste

== Production ==
The film stars two American actors in the lead roles, Rod Taylor and bodybuilder Ed Fury. Taylor claims to have rewritten the script extensively.

== Release ==
Colossus and the Amazon Queen was released in Italy on 8 September 1960 with a 98-minute running time. It was released in the United States in 1964 with an 84-minute running time.
