= I Don Giovanni della Costa Azzurra =

- Directed by: Vittorio Sala
- Written by: Adriano Baracco; Ennio De Concini; Fabio Rinaudo; Vittorio Sala
- Cinematography: Fausto Zuccoli
- Music by: Roberto Nicolosi
- Release date: 1962
- Country: Italy
- Language: Italian

I Don Giovanni della Costa Azzurra ("Don Juan of the French Riviera"), released in English-speaking countries as Beach Casanova, is a 1962 Italian comedy film, directed by Vittorio Sala. It stars Curd Jürgens, Annette Stroyberg, Martine Carol and Gabriele Ferzetti.

== Cast ==
- Curd Jürgens - Mr. Edmond
- Annette Stroyberg - Gloria
- Martine Carol - Nadine Leblanc
- Gabriele Ferzetti - Leblanc, the Lawyer
- Daniela Rocca - Assuntina Greco, aka "Géneviève"
- Paolo Ferrari - Michele
- Eleonora Rossi Drago - Jasmine
- Riccardo Garrone - Protettore di Assuntina
- Ingrid Schoeller - Denise
- Alberto Farnese - Commander
- Agnès Spaak - Nicole
- Tiberio Murgia - Melchiorre
- Coccinelle - Herself
- Francesco Mulè - Baldassarre Giaconia
- Ignazio Leone - Gaspare Patanè
- Mino Doro - Marito di Jasmine
- Raffaella Carrà - Cameriera motel
- Adriana Facchetti - American tourist
- Giuseppe Porelli - Gloria's Father
- Carlo Giustini - Yacht captain
- Mylène Demongeot - Cameo
