= The White Warrior =

- Directed by: Riccardo Freda
- Screenplay by: Gino De Santis; Ákos Tolnay; Riccardo Freda
- Based on: Hadji Murat by Leo Tolstoy
- Produced by: Mario Zama
- Starring: Steve Reeves; Giorgia Moll
- Cinematography: Mario Bava
- Edited by: Riccardo Freda
- Music by: Roberto Nicolosi
- Production companies: Majestic Films; Lovcen Film
- Distributed by: Warner Bros
- Release date: 21 June 1959 (Italy)
- Running time: 95 minutes
- Countries: Italy; Yugoslavia

The White Warrior (Italian: Agi Murad, il diavolo bianco, lit. 'Hadji Murad, The White Devil') is a 1959 adventure film directed by Riccardo Freda. It is loosely based on Lev Tolstoy's posthumously published 1912 novel Hadji Murat.

== Cast ==
- Steve Reeves: Agi Murad, the "White Warrior"
- Giorgia Moll: Sultanet
- Scilla Gabel: Princess Maria Vorontsova
- Renato Baldini: Ahmed Khan
- Gérard Herter: Prince Sergei
- Milivoje Živanović: Tsar Nicholas I

== Production ==
During the filming of parts of the final showdown, Alan Steel doubled Steve Reeves.

== Release ==
The White Warrior was released in Italy on 21 June 1959 where it was distributed by Lux Film. The film grossed a total of 483,160,000 Italian lire domestically.

== See also ==
- List of Italian films of 1959
