= Daniela Rocca =

Italian actress, model and writer (1937–1995)

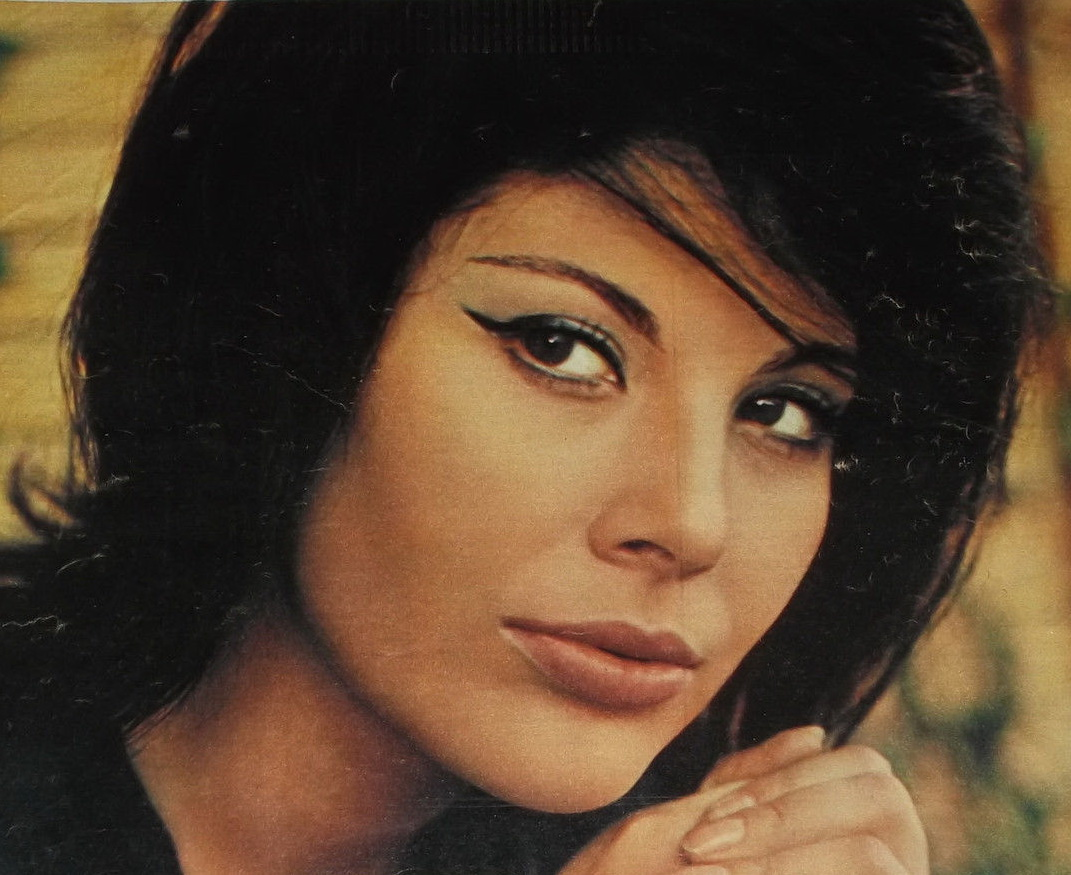
- Born: 12 September 1937; Acireale, Italy
- Died: 28 May 1995 (aged 57); Milo, Italy
- Years active: 1955–1970

Daniela Rocca (12 September 1937 – 28 May 1995) was an Italian actress, model and writer.

== Biography ==
Rocca was born and raised in Acireale, a small town near Catania. She became Miss Catania in 1953 and was discovered by talent scouts after competing in a Miss Italia competition.

Rocca made her film debut in French director Maurice Cloche's Marchands de Filles (1957) and also appeared in the Riccardo Freda film Caltiki – The Immortal Monster (Caltiki – il mostro immortale, 1959), and Esther and the King (1960). More film roles followed, but Rocca did not garner international attention until Divorce, Italian Style (Divorzio all'Italiana, 1961). Rocca became a star after playing the part of the smothering wife Marcello Mastroianni is desperate to escape in Pietro Germi's international box-office hit. For her performance, she was nominated for the BAFTA Award for Best Foreign Actress in 1963. Rocca fell in love with Germi during filming and attempted suicide when he rejected her. After that, she was considered unstable and was not offered significant roles. A nervous breakdown led to a stay in a mental hospital.

After playing minor roles in movies and television, her show business career ended in 1967. She ended her days in a retirement home in Milo, near Catania. There she wrote four books: Agente segreto con licenza di vivere; Avvocato offresi; Il condannato a morte; and Psicoanalisi, sogni, fantasie nascosti nella mente; and a collection of poems, Ara.

== Partial filmography ==
- La Luciana (1954)
- Il nostro campione (1955)
- Il padrone sono me (1955) - Nunziata
- Addio sogni di gloria (1957)
- Marchands de filles (1957) - Bettina
- Head of a Tyrant (1959) - Naomi
- Non perdiamo la testa (1959) - Volante
- Caltiki – The Immortal Monster (1959) - Linda
- Legions of the Nile (1959) - Teyrè
- The Giant of Marathon (1959) - Karis
- Austerlitz (1960) - Caroline Bonaparte
- Colossus and the Amazon Queen (1960) - Melitta
- Esther and the King (1960) - Queen Vashti
- Revenge of the Barbarians (1960) - Galla Placidia, Onorius' Sister
- Rome 1585 (1961) - Princess Alba of Portoreale
- Divorce, Italian Style (1961) - Rosalia Cefalù
- Peccati d'estate (1962) - Teresa
- The Captive City (1962) - Doushka
- I Don Giovanni della Costa Azzurra (1962) - Assuntina Greco, a.k.a. Géneviève
- L'attico (1963) - Silvana D'Angelo
- Symphonie pour un massacre (1963) - Hélène Valoti
- The Empty Canvas (1963) - Rita
- Behold a Pale Horse (1964) - Rosana, Mistress of Vinolas
- The Sucker (1965) - (uncredited)
- Assicurasi vergine (1967) - Carmela - don Pippo's lover
- Un giorno, una vita (1970) - Olga (final film role)
