= Ivo Garrani =

Italian actor and voice actor (1924–2015)

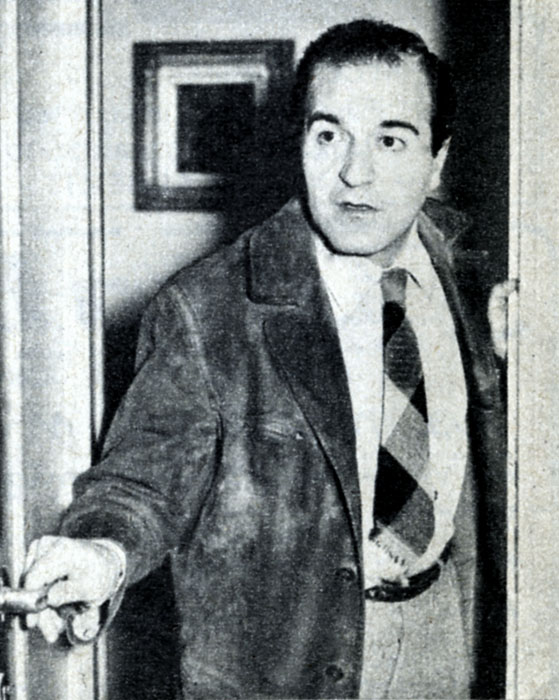
- Garrani in a 1954 issue of Radiocorriere.
- Born: 6 February 1924; Introdacqua, Abruzzo, Italy
- Died: 25 March 2015 (aged 91); Rome, Italy
- Occupations: Actor, voice actor
- Years active: 1952–2010
- Spouse: Lidia Gheducci (m. 1950)
- Children: Toni Garrani

Ivo Garrani (6 February 1924 – 25 March 2015) was an Italian actor and voice actor.

== Life and career ==
Born in Introdacqua, Abruzzo, Garrani originally studied to become an engineer in Rome before embarking on an acting career. He began his professional stage career in Carlo Tamberlani's company in 1943. In 1960, he founded the influential Attori Associati company with Enrico Maria Salerno and Giancarlo Sbragia.

Aside from his work on stage, including works with Giorgio Strehler, beginning in the 1950s he started a parallel activity in cinema, starring in a great number of films, even if usually in secondary or supporting roles. Two of his internationally best-known roles was as Prince Vajda in Mario Bava's horror film Black Sunday (1960) and as Marshal Soult in Sergei Bondarchuk's Napoleonic epic Waterloo (1970). He worked other prominent directors like Luchino Visconti, Abel Gance, Roberto Rossellini, Eduardo De Filippo, Costa-Gavras, and Carlo Lizzani. Garrani was also a frequent fixture on RAI television dramas and radio plays.

He was also active in Italian-language dubbing, including of Edmond O'Brien, Fredric March, John Wayne, Rod Steiger, and Brian Donlevy, among others.

== Personal life ==
Garrani married Lidia Gheducci in 1950. They had a son, Toni.

=== Death ===
Garrani died in Rome on 25 March 2015, at the age of 91.

== Selected filmography ==
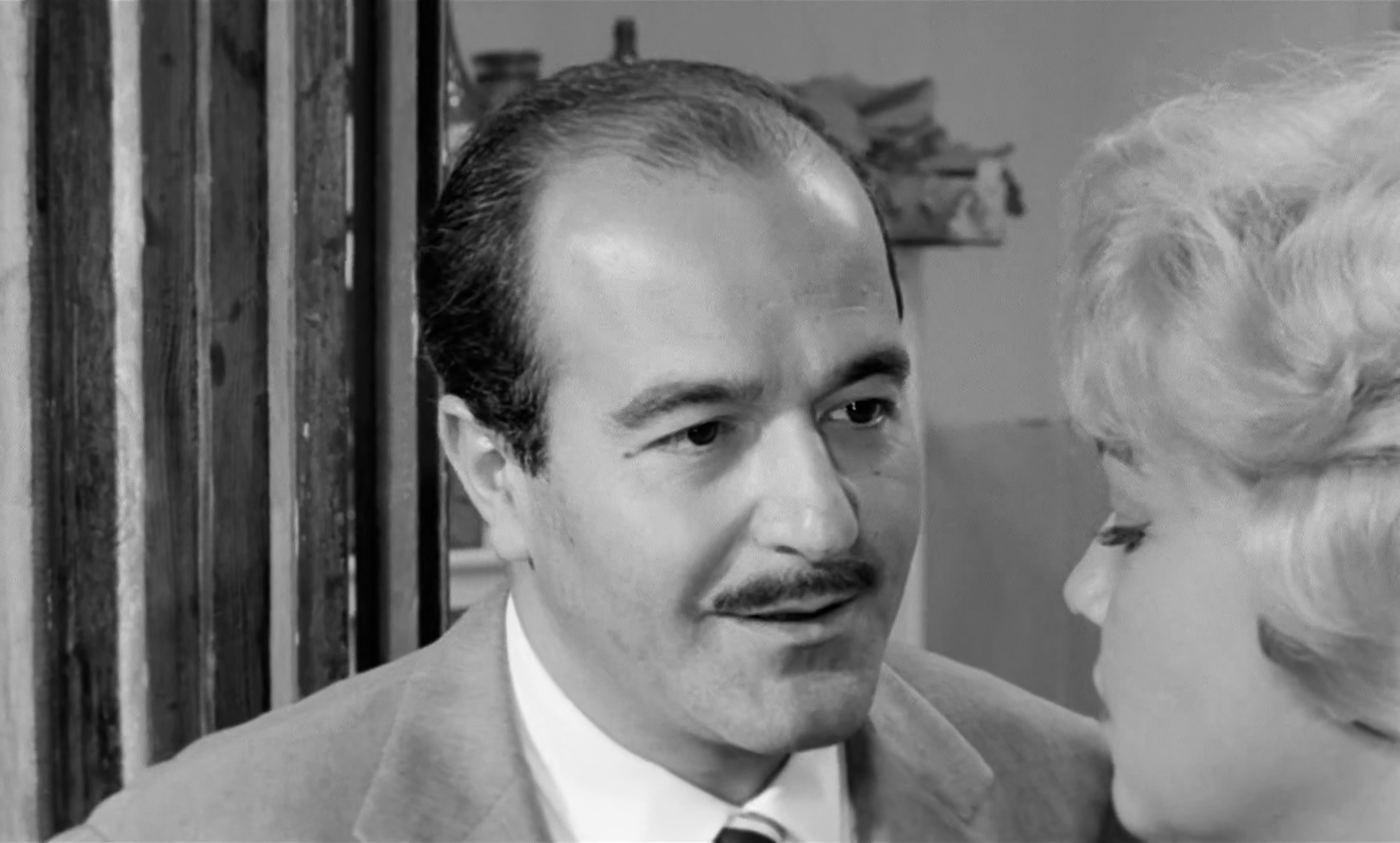
Garrani (left) with Simone Signoret (right) in Adua and Her Friends (1960).

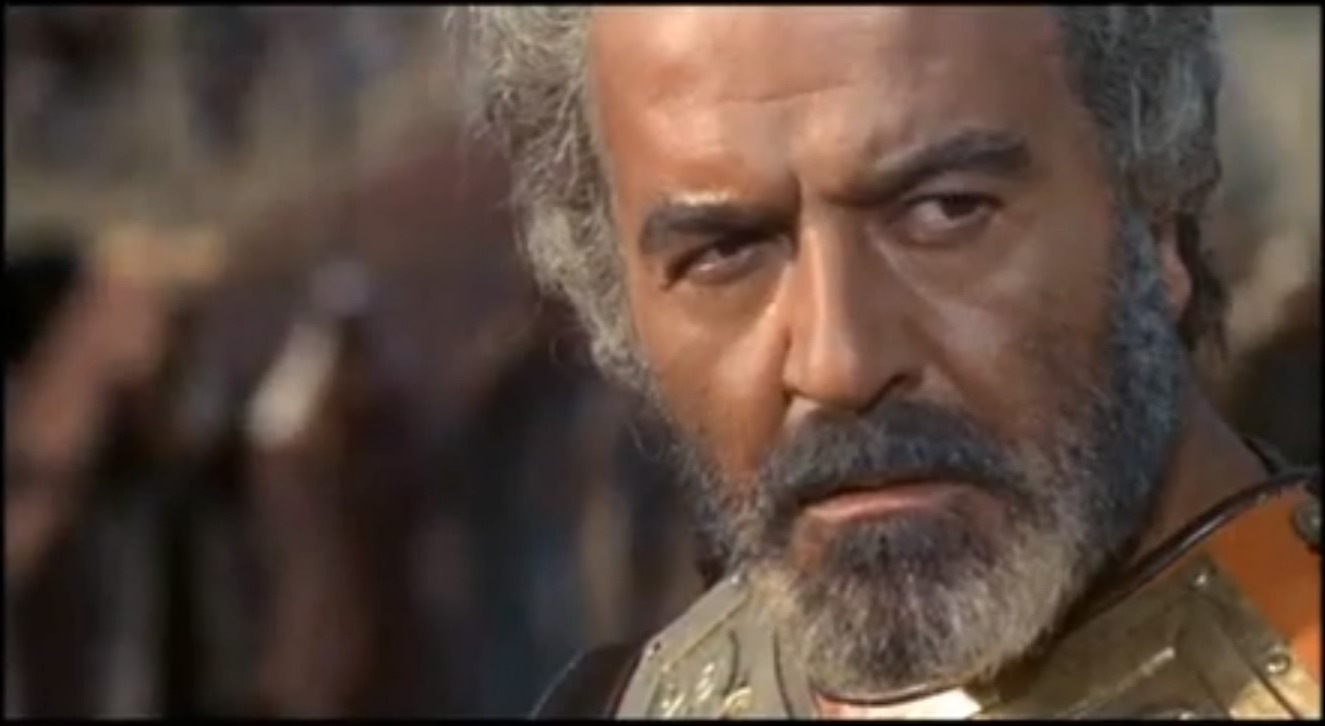
Garrani as Gideon in The Great Leaders (1965).

- Ragazze da marito (1952) - Tommaso Spadoni
- Orient Express (1954)
- Eighteen Year Olds (1955) - Il medico
- The Rival (1956) - Secondo ufficiale inquirente
- Roland the Mighty (1956) - Carlo Magno
- Terrore sulla città (1957)
- Hercules (1958) - Pelias, King of Iolcus
- Città di notte (1958) - Un dottore
- Slave Women of Corinth (1958) - Antigono
- The Day the Sky Exploded (1958) - Prof. Herbert Weisse
- Il padrone delle ferriere (1959) - Monsieur Moulinet
- Le Fric (1959) - Belar
- General della Rovere (1959) - Partisan chief (uncredited)
- The Giant of Marathon (1959) - Creuso
- Vento del sud (1959) - Padrino
- Carthage in Flames (1960) - Thala
- La strada dei giganti (1960) - Vincent Micocci
- L'ultimo zar (1960)
- Black Sunday (1960) - Prince Vajda
- Atom Age Vampire (1960) - commissioner Bouchard
- Adua and Friends (1960) - L'Avvocato - Adua's ex-customer
- Morgan, the Pirate (1960) - Governor Don José Guzman
- The Hunchback of Rome (1960) - Moretti
- Hercules and the Conquest of Atlantis (1961) - Re di Megalia
- Dreams Die at Dawn (1961) - Andrea
- Ten Italians for One German (1962) - Giovanni Ferroni
- The Slave (1962) - Julius Caesar - Roman Triunvir
- The Legion's Last Patrol (1962) - Colonel Dionne
- The Captive City (1962) - Mavroti
- The Shortest Day (1963) - Erede Siciliano (uncredited)
- The Verona Trial (1963) - Roberto Farinacci
- The Leopard (1963) - Colonel Pallavicino
- The Betrothed (1964) - L'Innominato
- Cyrano et d'Artagnan (1964)
- Senza sole nè luna (1964)
- Casanova 70 (1965) - Il avvocato
- The Great Leaders (1965) - Gedeone / Gideon
- La jeune morte (1965) - Le père
- The Rover (1967) - Scevola
- On My Way to the Crusades, I Met a Girl Who... (1967) - Duca Pandolfo
- Deadly Inheritance (1968) - Leon
- The Bandit (1969)
- Waterloo (1970) - Marshal Soult
- Liberation III: Direction of the Main Blow (1971) - Mussolini
- Maddalena (1971)
- Siamo tutti in libertà provvisoria (1971) - Attorney General
- Caliber 9 (1972) - Don Vincenzo
- Bronte: cronaca di un massacro che i libri di storia non hanno raccontato (1972) - Nicola Lombardo
- Un apprezzato professionista di sicuro avvenire (1972) - Lucetta's father
- À la guerre comme à la guerre (1972) - Lubianski
- Section spéciale (1975) - L'amiral François Darlan, vice-président du Conseil
- Street People (1976) - Salvatore Francesco
- Italia: Ultimo atto? (1977)
- Holocaust 2000 (1977) - Prime Minister
- The Repenter (1985)
- Soldati - 365 all'alba (1987) - Colonel
- The Invisible Wall (1991) - Copo Stato Maggiore della Difesa
- Nel continente nero (1993) - Monsignor Fantazzini
- Dio c'è (1998) - Ettore, Riccardo's father
- Zora the Vampire (2000) - Priest
- The Good Pope: Pope John XXIII (2003) - Cardinal Carcano
- Marcello Marcello (2008) - Delegate
