= Wild Cats on the Beach =

- Directed by: Vittorio Sala
- Written by: Ottavio Alessi; Rodolfo Sonego; Ugo Guerra; Vittorio Sala
- Cinematography: Bitto Albertini
- Edited by: Nino Baragli
- Music by: Roberto Nicolosi
- Release date: 1959
- Countries: Italy; France
- Language: Italian

Wild Cats on the Beach (Italian: Costa Azzurra, French: Côte d'Azur) is a 1959 Italian-French comedy film directed by Vittorio Sala.

== Cast ==
- Alberto Sordi: Alberto
- Rita Gam: Rita Elmont
- Elsa Martinelli: Doriana
- Franco Fabrizi: Nicola Ferrara
- Giovanna Ralli: Giovanna, Alberto's wife
- Antonio Cifariello: Gino
- Georgia Moll: Adelina
- Tiberio Murgia: Leopoldo Cinquemani
- Luciana Angiolillo: Susan
- Georges Marchal: Maurice Mont-Bret
- Jacques Berthier: Pierre Morand
- Lorella De Luca: Lisa
- Nino Besozzi: Carsoli
- Antonio Acqua: Man on train
- Luciano Mondolfo : the director
