= The Betrothed (1964 film) =

1964 film

- Directed by: Mario Maffei
- Written by: Alessandro Manzoni (novel); Mario Guerra; Vittorio Vighi; Maria Luisa Garoppo; Mario Maffei
- Starring: Gil Vidal; Maria Silva; Arturo Dominici; Manuel Monroy
- Cinematography: Julio Ortas; Tino Santoni
- Music by: Carlo Rustichelli
- Release date: 20 February 1964
- Running time: 106 minutes
- Countries: Italy; Spain
- Language: Italian

The Betrothed (Italian: I promessi sposi) is a 1964 Italian-Spanish historical drama film directed by Mario Maffei and starring Gil Vidal, Maria Silva and Arturo Dominici. It is based on the 1827 novel The Betrothed by Alessandro Manzoni, one of three film adaptations made during the twentieth century.

== Plot summary ==
Lombardy: 1629. Renzo Tramaglino and Lucia Mondella are two poor farmers who are in love, but they are hampered by the wickedness of the powerful Don Rodrigo, who secretly loves Lucia. The two run away from Lake Como where they live, and take refuge inland. Renzo goes to Milan by a cousin, while Lucia is hiding in the convent of Monza, where he meets the Lady. Don Rodrigo, however, kidnaps Lucia from a friend of his: the Unnamed, who leads her in his castle. Lucia with prayers can move the cruel man, who lets her go. But now there's another issue that prevents Renzo and Lucia to meet: the plague.

== Cast ==
- Gil Vidal as Renzo Tramaglino
- Maria Silva as Lucia Mondella
- Arturo Dominici as Cardinal Federigo Borromeo
- Manuel Monroy as Don Rodrigo
- Ivo Garrani as l'Innominato (The Unnamed)
- Carlo Campanini as Don Abbondio
- Amalia Rodriguez as Agnese
- Lilla Brignone as Perpetua
- Ilaria Occhini as Gertrude
- Umberto Raho as Fra Cristoforo
- Paolo Carlini as Egidio

== Bibliography ==
- Buonanno, Milly. Italian TV Drama and Beyond: Stories from the Soil, Stories from the Sea. Intellect Books, 2012.
