= Arturo Dominici =

Italian actor (1916–1992)

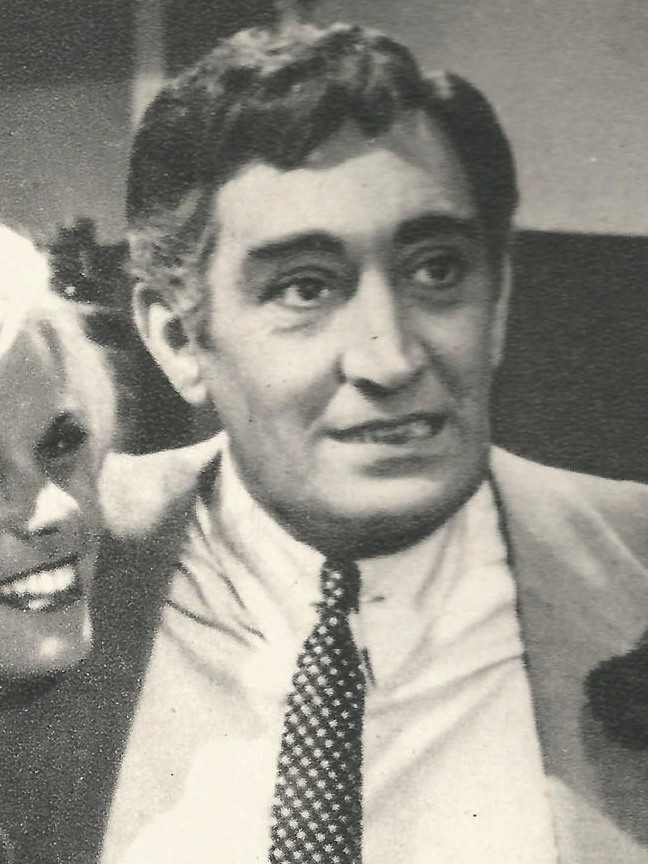
- Dominici in I due evasi di Sing Sing (1964)
- Born: 2 January 1916; Palermo, Sicily, Italy
- Died: 7 September 1992 (aged 76); Rome, Lazio, Italy
- Education: University of Palermo
- Occupations: Actor, voice actor
- Years active: 1947–1983
- Spouse: Irene Quattrini
- Children: 3, including Germana

Arturo Dominici (2 January 1916 – 7 September 1992) was an Italian actor and voice actor.

== Early life and education ==
Dominici was born in Palermo, Sicily in 1916. He originally studied linguistics at the University of Palermo, before embarking on an acting career. During the Second World War, he was conscripted into the Italian Army and served on the Yugoslavian front.

== Career ==
In 1947, Dominici was cast in a small role in the Sicily-shot film Il principe ribelle. The positive experience led him to move to Rome to seek more film roles. With his elegant bearing and an expressive face, he became best known for his many villainous roles in horror and fantasy films.

He is best remembered for his performance as the monstrous Igor Javutich in Mario Bava's Black Sunday (1960), the evil Eurysteus in the 1958 Steve Reeves epic Hercules, and Mangani in Investigation of a Citizen Above Suspicion. His filmography includes more than 80 titles, including Antonio Margheriti's Castle of Blood (1964), in which he appeared with his Black Sunday co-star Barbara Steele. On television, he starred in the 1971 Italian version of the science-fiction serial A for Andromeda.

=== Dubbing ===
Dominci's was a prolific Italian-language dubber. Among others, he dubbed Martin Balsam, James Doohan (in Star Trek II: The Wrath of Khan, Star Trek III: The Search for Spock), Bernard Lee (Live and Let Die, The Man with the Golden Gun), Peter Cushing, José Ferrer, George Kennedy and Robert Duvall. He dubbed the voice of Salvatore Corsitto as Amerigo Buonasera in the Italian version of The Godfather (1972), Walter Ladengast in Werner Herzog's Nosferatu the Vampyre (1979), and the animated character Papa Smurf in the 1981 cartoon The Smurfs.

He did the Italian dubs of the Japanese anime Hurricane Polymar, Great Mazinger, and Heidi, Girl of the Alps.

== Personal life ==
Dominici was married twice, first to Irene Quattrini and later to Yugoslavian painter Liana Dodoja. He had three children. His daughter, Germana (1946–2024), was an actress and dubber; at the age of 14 she had the role of the farm girl alongside her father in Black Sunday. He was also the maternal grandfather of the voice actress Lilli Manzini and media personality Francesca Manzini.

=== Death ===
Dominici died of cancer on 7 September 1992, aged 76, and is buried at Cimitero Flaminio in Rome.

== Partial filmography ==
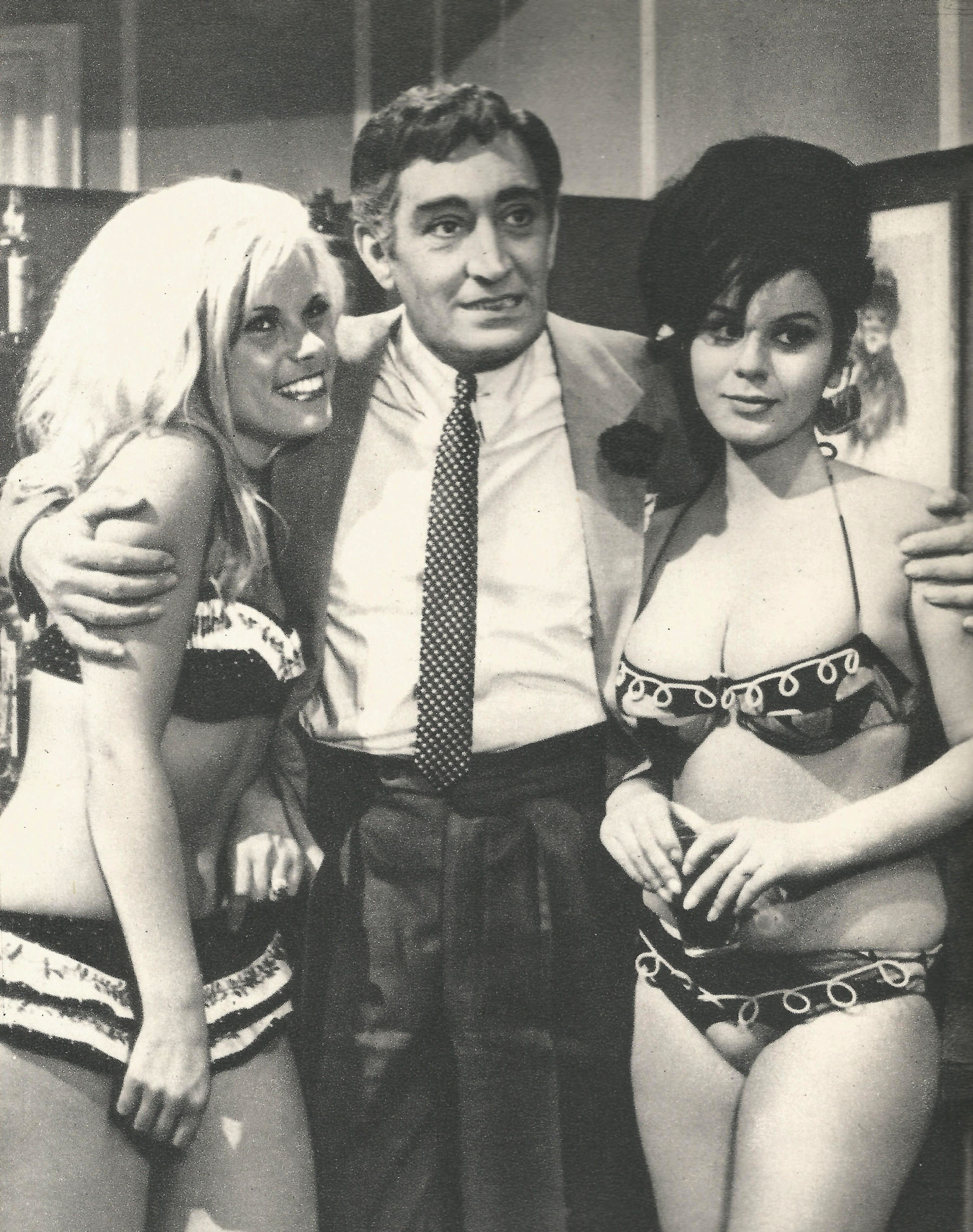
Dominici in I due evasi di Sing Sing (1964)

- Il principe ribelle (1949)
- Yvonne of the Night (1949) – Un ufficiale di cavalleria
- Cavalcade of Heroes (1950) – Generale Gilletti
- The Last Race (1954) – Doctor Magni
- Red and Black (1955)
- Hercules (1958) – Eurysteus
- Lost Souls (1959) – Franco
- Goliath and the Barbarians (1959) – Svevo
- Caltiki – The Immortal Monster (1959) – Nieto
- Messalina (1960) – Caio Silio
- I piaceri del sabato notte (1960) – Un cliente dell'atelier
- Black Sunday (1960) – Igor Javutich / Javuto
- Revenge of the Barbarians (1960) – Antemius
- Un dollaro di fifa (1960) – Chancellor
- The Thief of Baghdad (1961) – Prince Osman
- The Story of Joseph and His Brethren (1961) – Rekmira, the Minister
- The Trojan Horse (1961) – Achilles
- A Difficult Life (1961) – Ragana (voice, uncredited)
- Charge of the Black Lancers (1962) – Il capo dei Krevires
- The Triumph of Robin Hood (1962) – Baron Elwin, Sheriff of Nottingham
- Seven Seas to Calais (1962) – Don Bernardino de Mendoza, the Spanish Ambassador
- Medusa Against the Son of Hercules (1963) – Acrisio
- The Sign of the Coyote (1963) – Judge Clemens
- Hercules and the Masked Rider (1963) – Don Ramiro Suarez
- Hercules vs. Moloch (1963) – Penthius, General of Micenas
- The Betrothed (1964) – Il cardinale Federico Borromeo
- Temple of the White Elephant (1964) – Maharajah
- L'ultima carica (1964)
- Castle of Blood (1964, aka Danza Macabre) – Dr. Carmus
- Two Escape from Sing Sing (1964) – Attanasia
- Hercules and the Tyrants of Babylon (1964)
- Goliath at the Conquest of Damascus (1965) – Kaichev
- Fantômas se déchaîne (1965) – Le professeur canadien
- A Coffin for the Sheriff (1965) – Jerry Krueger
- Giant of the Evil Island (1965) – Don Alvarado
- Zorro il ribelle (1966) – Don Alvarez
- Untamable Angelique (1967) – Mezzo Morte (uncredited)
- Fantabulous Inc. (1967) – Captain Fenninger
- Angelique and the Sultan (1968) – Mezzo Morte (uncredited)
- The Moment to Kill (1968) – Forester
- VIP my Brother Superman (1968) – (voice)
- Dio perdoni la mia pistola (1969) – Judge Collins
- Catherine, il suffit d'un amour (1969) – La Grêle
- Love Is a Funny Thing (1969) – Le douanier
- Satiricosissimo (1970) – Tigellino
- Investigation of a Citizen Above Suspicion (1970) – Mangani
- Confessions of a Police Captain (1971) – Lawyer Canistraro
- Zorro il cavaliere della vendetta (1971)
- The Adventures of Pinocchio (1972) – The Green Fisherman (voice)
- The Eroticist (1972) – His Excellency
- The Assassin of Rome (1972) – Ing. Jaccarino
- Il caso Pisciotta (1972) – Michele Scauri
- Sinbad and the Caliph of Baghdad (1973) – Visir
- Special Killers (1973) – District Attorney
- Il nano e la strega (1973) – Il Notaio (voice)
- Silent Action (1975) – Chief of police
- Lo sgarbo (1975)
- Free Hand for a Tough Cop (1976) – De Rita
- Tony, l'altra faccia della Torino violenta (1980) – (voice)
- Cappotto di legno (1981) – Ministro Interni
- The Professor (1986) – Joe Gambino (voice, uncredited)
