= Rome 1585 =

1961 film directed by Mario Bonnard

- Directed by: Mario Bonnard
- Written by: Mario Bonnard; Nino Minutolo
- Produced by: Mario Pellegrino
- Starring: Daniela Rocca; Antonio Cifariello
- Cinematography: Marco Scarpelli
- Edited by: Nella Nannuzzi
- Music by: Giulio Bonnard
- Release date: 1961
- Language: Italian

Rome 1585 (Italian: I masnadieri), also known as The Mercenaries, is a 1961 Italian epic adventure film co-written and directed by Mario Bonnard and starring Daniela Rocca and Antonio Cifariello. It is Bonnard's last film.

== Cast ==
- Daniela Rocca as Alba di Porto Reale
- Antonio Cifariello as Captain Mellina
- Salvo Randone as Pope Sixtus V
- Folco Lulli as Fra Silenzio
- Debra Paget as Esmeralda
- Yvonne Sanson as Olimpia Gonzales
- Livio Lorenzon as Duke of Bolsena
- Giulio Donnini
- Gianni Solaro
- Nerio Bernardi
- Mino Doro
