= Esther and the King =

1960 film by Mario Bava, Raoul Walsh

- Theatrical release poster
- Directed by: Raoul Walsh; Italian version: Mario Bava
- Screenplay by: Raoul Walsh; Michael Elkins; Uncredited: Ennio De Concini
- Based on: Book of Esther
- Produced by: Raoul Walsh
- Starring: Joan Collins; Richard Egan; Denis O'Dea
- Cinematography: Mario Bava
- Edited by: Jerry Webb
- Music by: Francesco Lavagnino; Roberto Nicolosi
- Production companies: 20th Century-Fox; Galatea Film
- Distributed by: 20th Century-Fox
- Release date: December 14, 1960 (United States)
- Running time: 109 minutes
- Countries: United States; Italy
- Language: English

Esther and the King (Italian: Ester e il re) is a 1960 religious epic film produced and directed by Raoul Walsh and starring Joan Collins as Esther, Richard Egan as Ahasuerus, and Denis O'Dea as Mordecai. Walsh and Michael Elkins wrote the screenplay, which was based on the Book of Esther of the Hebrew Bible and the Old Testament.

An international co-production released by 20th Century-Fox, Esther and the King was filmed in Italy in the CinemaScope format (although not signed as such) and the Technicolor color process. Mario Bava, the film's cinematographer, was credited as a co-director on Italian prints of the film.

== Plot ==
In Persia in the 5th century BC, a Jewish woman named Esther comes to the attention of the recently widowed King Ahasuerus. The king has been trying to defeat the campaign of hatred against the Jews by his evil minister Haman. Before the king pairs with Esther to defeat Haman, there are several intervening adventures and an attractive other woman who competes for attention.

== Cast ==
The film's on-screen credits list the cast in the following order and sections:

Starring

- Joan Collins as Esther
- Richard Egan as Ahasuerus, King of Persia

With

- Denis O'Dea as Mordecai
- Sergio Fantoni as Haman
- Rik Battaglia (as Rick Battaglia) as Simon
- Renato Baldini as Klydrathes
- Gabriele Tinti as Samuel
- Rosalba Neri as Zeresh
- Walter Williams (as Robert Buchanan) as Hegai

Also starring

- Daniela Rocca as Vashti
- Folco Lulli as Tobiah

== Production ==
In December 1950, 20th Century-Fox studio executive Darryl F. Zanuck announced his intention to produce The Story of Esther as a follow-up to David and Bathsheba, which he was producing at the time. He entrusted Frank and Doris Hursley with the task of writing the screenplay. George Jessel expressed interest in producing the film.

In February 1951, Henry King was assigned to direct the film. In October, producers Joseph Bernhard and Anson Bond purchased the script from the Hursleys and were planning the film as a 20th Century-Fox release.

In February 1952, Hedy Lamarr bought the Hursley script for $25,000; Arthur B. Krim of United Artists negotiated the deal for her. Lamarr wanted to portray Esther and produce the story as an independent feature and United Artists release, with the possibility of filming it in Italy. She eventually decided to produce it in Rome as the first episode of a British television series titled The Great Love Stories, but the project changed and the story was not filmed.

The 1960 Writers Guild of America strike, which began in January, forced 20th Century-Fox to cease production temporarily. Fox president Spyros Skouras and producer Buddy Adler asked director Raoul Walsh if he could "make a film very quickly for them, because they had nothing at all, the studios were practically shut. That's why we made Esther in Italy."

== Release ==
Esther and the King premiered in New York City at the RKO Palace Theatre on November 18, 1960.

The film grossed 126% and was considered a hit film of the 1960–61 season.

== Critical response ==
James D. Ivers, writing for Motion Picture Daily, was enthusiastically positive: "All the trappings of a Biblical spectacle, exotic sets and costumes, a moving and dramatic story, and the skilled and experienced hand of Raoul Walsh make this a worthy and potentially successful entry in the present cycle of historical epics." Ivers also commended the performances of the leading actors: "Joan Collins plays Esther with beauty and some depth, Richard Egan is properly virile as a soldierly but unstatesmanlike King Ahasuerus, and Denis O'Dea is dignified and devout as Mordecai." The supporting actors who earned notice were a "satisfactory" Rik Battaglia, a "sufficiently menacing" Sergio Fantoni and a "somewhat overly voluptuous" Daniela Rocca. Ivers also admired the technical aspects of the film: "Color by DeLuxe and excellent camera work by Mario Bava give an eye-filling background to the straightforward story."

Some critics disliked the film. Bosley Crowther of The New York Times wrote that the "beautiful Bible story of Esther" had "been thumped into a crude costume charade." Harrison's Reports found that the film "has a hackneyed script and two incompetent lead players [Collins and Egan]," but it praised O'Dea's portrayal of Mordecai.

In recent years, Rosalba Neri's performance has been evaluated as "memorable."

== Home media ==
In 2014, 20th Century Fox Home Entertainment released Esther and the King on DVD as part of the manufactured-on-demand Cinema Archives line.
