= Revenge of the Barbarians =

- Directed by: Giuseppe Vari
- Starring: Daniela Rocca; Anthony Steel; Robert Alda
- Cinematography: Sergio Pesce
- Music by: Roberto Nicolosi
- Release date: 1960
- Country: Italy
- Languages: Italian; English

Revenge of the Barbarians (Italian: La vendetta dei barbari) is a 1960 film about the sack of Rome in AD 410 by the Visigoths.

This film was written by Gastone Ramazzotti and directed by Giuseppe Vari.

== Cast ==
- Daniela Rocca as Galla Placidia
- Anthony Steel as Consul Olympus
- Robert Alda as Ataulf
- José Greci as Sabina
- Mario Scaccia as Honorius
- Evi Marandi as Ameria
- Arturo Dominici as Antemius
- Cesare Fantoni as Alaric I
- Salvatore Borghese as Gothic Warrior

== Production ==
Anthony Steel had moved to Rome following his divorce from Anita Ekberg and this was the first of several movies he made in that country.

== See also ==
- List of historical drama films
