= Arsoli =

- Comune
- Comune di Arsoli
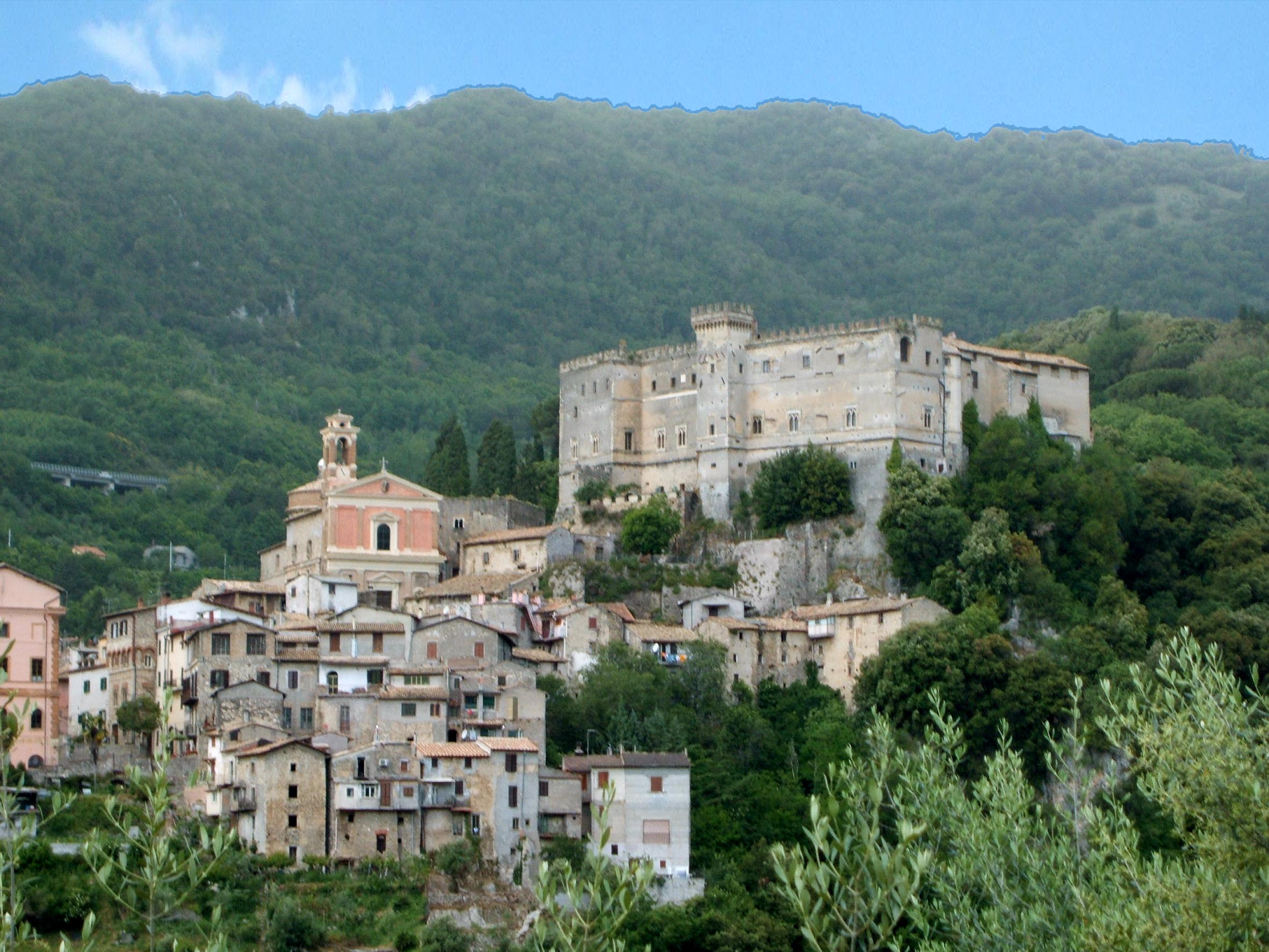
- View of Arsoli

- Location of Arsoli in Italy Arsoli (Lazio)
- Coordinates: 42°02′N 13°01′E
- Country: Italy
- Region: Lazio
- Metropolitan city: Rome (RM)

Government
  - Mayor: Gabriele Caucci

Area
  - Total: 12.2 km^{2} (4.7 sq mi)
- Elevation: 666 m (2,185 ft)

Population (31 December 2021)
  - Total: 1,382
  - Density: 113/km^{2} (293/sq mi)
- Demonym: Arsòlani
- Time zone: UTC+1 (CET)
  - Summer (DST): UTC+2 (CEST)
- Postal code: 00023
- Dialing code: 0774
- ISTAT code: 058010
- Saint day: December 23
- Website: Official website

Arsoli (Romanesco: Àrzuli) is a town and a comune in the Metropolitan City of Rome, central Italy.

== Main sights ==
The narrow ancient streets of the medieval centre are still preserved, as well as the castle, once a possession of the Benedictine Order; it dates from the 11th century. The castle is built at the end of a spur, overlooking Arsoli on one side and extending formal gardens on the other. four frescoed rooms on the piano nobile are flanked by guardrooms hung with arms, armor and family portraits.

This rocca has been in his possession since it was purchased by Fabrizio Massimo in 1574. He commissioned Giacomo Della Porta to remodel the church and commissioned the construction of an aqueduct to supplement inadequate wells, for the abundant springs of Arsoli have been tapped to serve the city of Rome since 600 BC, traditional date of an aqueduct, built, according to tradition, by Ancus Marcius.

== International relations ==
Arsoli is twinned with:

- Blagaj, Bosnia and Herzegovina
- Mostar, Bosnia and Herzegovina
