= Non perdiamo la testa =

1959 film

- Directed by: Mario Mattoli
- Written by: Ettore Scola
- Starring: Ugo Tognazzi
- Edited by: Roberto Cinquini
- Release date: 1959
- Running time: 94 minutes
- Country: Italy
- Language: Italian

Non perdiamo la testa (Italian for 'Let's not lose our heads') is a 1959 Italian comedy film directed by Mario Mattoli and starring Ugo Tognazzi.

== Cast ==
- Ugo Tognazzi as Tony Cuccar
- Franca Valeri as Beatrice
- Carlo Campanini as Walter
- Xenia Valderi as Erminia
- Aroldo Tieri as Ispettore di Scotland Yard
- Gianrico Tedeschi as Prof. Daniele
- Olghina di Robilant
- Daniele Vargas as The Butler
- Franco Coop as Greenwood
- Caprice Chantal as Katy
- Daniela Rocca as Violante
- Tina Pica as Signora Cuccar
