= Vittorio Sala =

Italian screenwriter (1918–1996)

- Born: 1 May 1918; Palermo, Sicily, Italy
- Died: 11 May 1996 (aged 78); Rome, Lazio, Italy
- Occupations: Writer, Director
- Years active: 1935-1978 (film)

Vittorio Sala (1918–1996) was an Italian screenwriter and film director.

== Selected filmography ==
- A Woman Alone (1956)
- Wild Cats on the Beach (1959)
- Colossus and the Amazon Queen (1960)
- I Don Giovanni della Costa Azzurra (1962)
- Berlin, Appointment for the Spies (1965)
- Diamonds Are a Man's Best Friend (1966)

== Bibliography ==
- Capua, Michelangelo. Anatole Litvak: The Life and Films. McFarland, 2015.
