= The Giant of Marathon =

1959 film by Mario Bava, Jacques Tourneur

- Theatrical release poster
- Directed by: Jacques Tourneur; Mario Bava
- Screenplay by: Ennio De Concini; Augusto Frassinetti; Bruno Vailati
- Story by: Ennio De Concini; Augusto Frassinetti; Bruno Vailati
- Based on: An idea by Alberto Barsanti and Raffaello Pacini
- Produced by: Bruno Vailati
- Starring: Steve Reeves; Mylène Demongeot; Sergio Fantoni
- Cinematography: Mario Bava
- Edited by: Mario Serandrei
- Music by: Roberto Nicolosi
- Color process: Eastmancolor
- Production companies: Titanus; Galatea Film; Lux Compagnie Cinematographique de France; Societe Cinematographique Lyre
- Distributed by: Metro-Goldwyn-Mayer
- Release dates: 3 December 1959 (Italy); 11 May 1960 (USA)
- Running time: 84 minutes
- Countries: Italy; France
- Languages: Italian; English

The Giant of Marathon (Italian: La battaglia di Maratona) is a 1959 international co-production sword and sandal film, loosely based on the Battle of Marathon. It was directed by Jacques Tourneur and Mario Bava. It starred Steve Reeves as Phillipides. The film was a co-production between Italy's Titanus and Galatea Film and France's Lux Compagnie Cinematographique de France and Societe Cinematographique Lyre.

== Plot ==
The story is set in 490 BC, the time of the Medic Wars, during which Persian armies sweep through the Ancient world. Having brought home to Athens the Olympic victor's laurel crown, Phillippides becomes commander of the Sacred Guard, which is expected to defend the city-state's liberty, a year after the expulsion of the tyrant Hippias.

Athenian supporters of Hippias conspire, hoping to sideline Phillippides with a marriage to Theocrites' expensive servant Charis, and thus neutralize the guard. She fails to seduce him, as his heart is already taken by a young girl before he learns her name is Andromeda, daughter of Creuso.

Everything personal is likely to be put on hold when the news breaks that the vast army of Darius, the Persian King of Kings, is marching on Greece, hoping that its internal division will make its conquest a walk-over. Theocrites instructs Miltiades to hold back the Sacred Guard to defend the temple of Pallas after a likely defeat, and proposes instead to negotiate terms with Darius, but is told an alliance with Sparta could save the Hellenic nation.

Phillippides makes the journey and survives an attempt on his life by conspirators; he returns with Sparta's engagement during the Persian attack in far greater numbers on Militiades valiant troops. Charis, left for dead after overhearing Darius's orders, reaches the camp to tell that the Persian fleet, now commanded by the traitor Theocrites, is heading for the Piraeus to take Athens. Miltiades sends Phillippides ahead to hold out with the Sacred Guard until his hopefully victorious troops arrive, and after his perilous journey back they successfully beat back the Persians.

== Cast ==
- Steve Reeves as Phillipides
- Mylène Demongeot as Andromeda, Creuso's daughter
- Sergio Fantoni as Theocritus
- Daniela Rocca as Charis
- Philippe Hersent as Callimachus
- Alberto Lupo as Miltiades
- Daniele Vargas as Darius I, King of Persia
- Miranda Campa as Andromeda's handmaid
- Gianni Loti as Teucro
- Anita Todesco as Andromeda's friend
- Ivo Garrani as Creuso
- Sergio Ciani as Euros
- Franco Fantasia
- Carlo Lombardi
- Ignazio Balsamo
- Gian Paolo Rosmino

== Production ==
The Giant of Marathon was shot on location in Italy. Ten days before the premiere, director Mario Bava was forced to reshoot exterior scenes because several extras were spotted smoking cigarettes on camera.

== Release ==
In Italy, the film was released on 3 December 1959. The film was dubbed into English for its North American release. This release included several underwater scenes of the sacred guard planting spikes in coral and fighting alongside Persian ships. The film had "pre-release" openings in Brooklyn and Long Island on 11 May 1960 before a saturation release in the United States around Memorial Day. It opened in Los Angeles in the week of 20 May 1960 and in New York on 25 May 1960. The film was released in the US as Giant of Marathon and everywhere else as Battle of Marathon.

The film was very successful at the box office: according to MGM records the film earned $1,335,000 in the US and Canada and $1.4 million elsewhere resulting in a profit of $429,000. Kine Weekly called it a "money maker" at the British box office in 1960.

== See also ==
- The Film Crew - Former MST3K members Kevin Murphy, Michael J. Nelson and Bill Corbett that riffed on the 1959 film
- Hercules Unchained, another 1959 Steve Reeves film also riffed by MST3K
