= Hercules (1958 film) =

- Italian film poster
- Directed by: Pietro Francisci
- Screenplay by: Ennio De Concini; Pietro Francisci; Gaio Frattini
- Story by: Pietro Francisci (Adaptation)
- Based on: The Argonauts; 3rd century BC by Apollonius of Rhodes
- Produced by: Federico Teti
- Starring: Steve Reeves; Sylva Koscina; Gianna Maria Canale; Fabrizio Mioni; Arturo Dominici; Mimmo Palmara; Lidia Alfonsi; Gina Rovere
- Cinematography: Mario Bava
- Edited by: Mario Serandrei
- Music by: Enzo Masetti
- Production companies: O.S.C.A.R. Galatea Film
- Distributed by: Lux Film
- Release date: 20 February 1958 (Italy)
- Running time: 107 minutes
- Country: Italy
- Language: Italian
- Budget: $2 million
- Box office: $5 million (US/Canada rentals); 66.6 million tickets (worldwide)

Hercules (Italian: Le Fatiche di Ercole, lit. 'The Labours of Hercules') is a 1958 Italian sword-and-sandal film based upon the Hercules and the Quest for the Golden Fleece myths. The film stars Steve Reeves as the titular hero and Sylva Koscina as his love interest Princess Iole. Hercules was directed by Pietro Francisci and produced by Federico Teti. The film spawned a 1959 sequel, Hercules Unchained (Italian: Ercole e la Regina di Lidia), that also starred Reeves and Koscina.

== Plot ==
Hercules of Thebes saves Iole when she loses control of her chariot's horses. He is on his way to Iolcus, where she is princess, daughter of king Pelias. She tells of the day where she, as young niece of the king Aeson and his son Jason, saw the procession of a murderer, Eurysteus, being brought by a military escort party to a place of trial.

Chirone, the captain of the escort and Hercules's teacher and friend, is known to have recently quarreled with king Aeson, and later that day when Aeson is found having been murdered, suspicion falls upon Chirone. Hercules observes that some, however, doubt Chirone's role in the murder; Iole becomes defensive at the very mention of this alternative theory, lamenting that her own father is known as the next logical suspect.

Eurysteus remains hidden, known only to king Pelias.

Ephesus, Iole's brother, follows Hercules in his hunt for a lion which has been ravaging village folk. The lion kills Ephesus and upon return to Iolcus, king Pelias unjustly blames Hercules, demanding he redeem himself by killing the Cretan Bull.

After doing so, he encounters Jason and Chirone who have long been in hiding. Gored by the Cretan Bull, Chirone's last wish is that Jason assume the throne, but refuses to tell Hercules who killed Jason's father.

Jason and Hercules make their way back to the city. Jason, however, is wearing only one sandal, having lost it on the way, and this unfortunately coincides with the prophecy to the king that he needs to fear someone wearing one sandal. This leaves the king trusting Hercules and Jason less than ever and thus he sends them on another quest to either retrieve the golden fleece or die trying. Many in the town, however, offer them their full support and so a large party embarks. This party includes Eurysteus.

On their three month voyage they are accosted first by the Amazon women (and would have stayed with them if not for Hercules drugging and kidnapping them), and then by the men of the Colchides. Jason breaks away from this latter battle and gains the fleece, by vanquishing a dragon. He discovers that on the back of the fleece, written in blood, by his father, is a condemnation of King Pelias.

On the voyage home the fleece, and Eurysteus, are missed. Therefore, upon their return to Iolcus, the crew are unable to produce it, which would have been the only way to challenge Pelias for the kingdom. A fight ensues between the crew and the palace guards, during which Hercules is enchained and imprisoned. Iole finds her father having taken poison, and actually catches him in the act of burning the fleece whose words would condemn him. Hercules breaks free, vanquishing the guards using the chains attached to his arms. The testimony of the fleece is taken seriously, Jason is made king, and Hercules and Iole sail out on their honeymoon, to the joy of the crew.

== Cast ==
- Steve Reeves as Hercules
- Sylva Koscina as Iole
- Fabrizio Mioni as Jason
- Ivo Garrani as Pelias, King of Iolcus
- Gianna Maria Canale as Antea, Queen of the Amazons
- Arturo Dominici as Eurysteus
- Mimmo Palmara as Iphitus, son of Pelias
- Lidia Alfonsi as The Sibyl
- Gabriele Antonini as Ulysses
- Aldo Fiorelli as Argos
- Andrea Fantasia as Laertes
- Luciana Paluzzi as Iole's maid as Luciana Paoluzzi
- Afro Poli as Chiron
- Gian Paolo Rosmino as Aesculapius
- Willi Colombini as Pollux
- Fulvio Carrara as Castor
- Gino Mattera as Orpheus
- Gina Rovere as Amazon
- Lily Granado as Amazon
- Aldo Pini as Tifi
- Guido Martufi as Iphitus, as a child
- Paola Quattrini as Iole, as a child

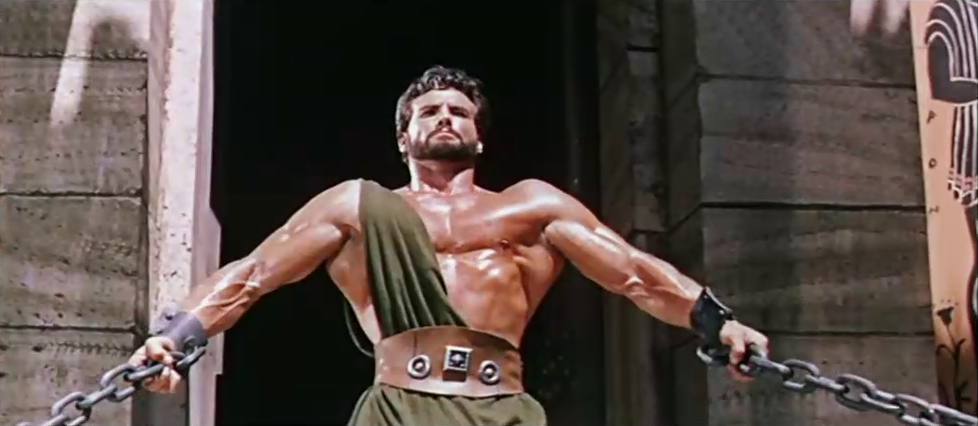
Steve Reeves as Hercules

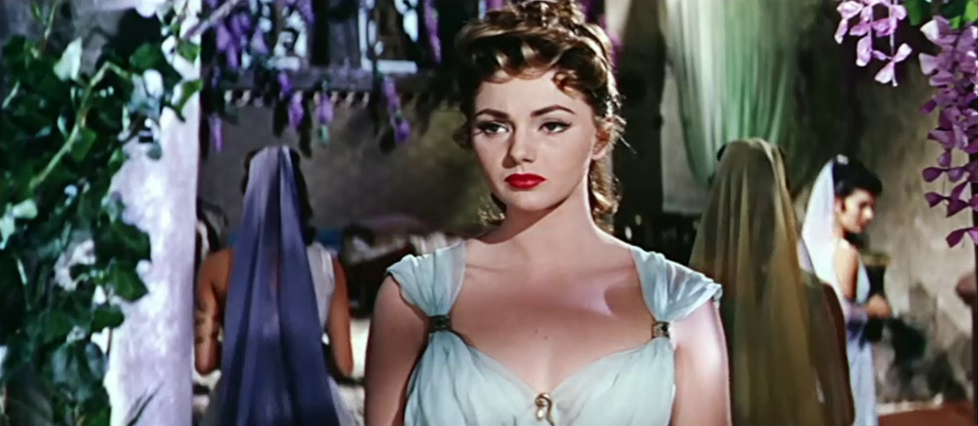
Sylva Koscina as Iole

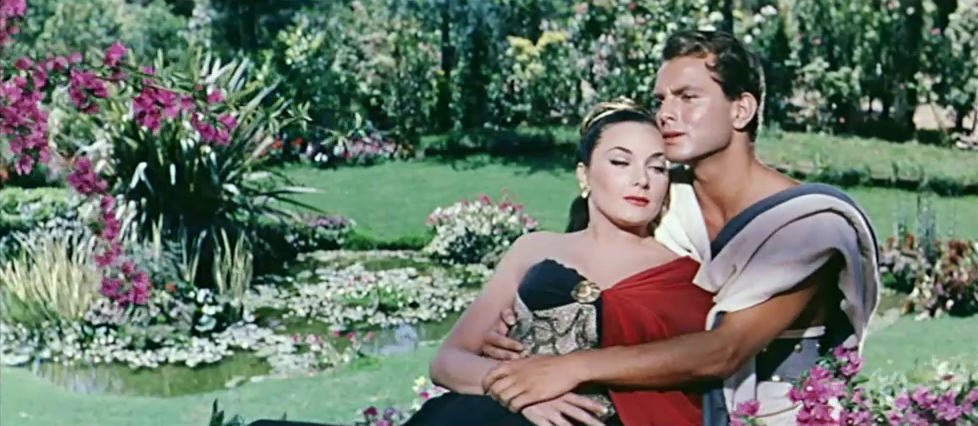
Gianna Maria Canale as Antea (left) and Fabrizio Mioni as Jason

== Production ==
Hercules was shot in Eastmancolor, using the French widescreen process Dyaliscope. An American bison served as the Cretan Bull.

The creature's roar (at the end of the film, guarding the Golden Fleece) is taken from the original Godzilla (1954).

== Distribution ==
Hercules was released in Italy on 20 February 1958.

American producer Joseph E. Levine acquired the U.S. distribution rights to the film and Warner Bros. Pictures advanced Levine $300,000 for the privilege of distributing the film in the US. The film opened at the Hippodrome Theatre in Baltimore on 26 June 1959. It had an intensive promotional campaign costing $1.25 million and a then-wide release of 550 theatres.

It premiered in England on 18 May 1959 and in Spain on 23 November 1959. In 1961 Levine and Warner Bros. reissued a double feature of Hercules and Attila (1954) with the tagline The Mightiest Men in All the World...The Mightiest Show in All the World.

=== Box office ===
In Europe, the film sold 5,838,816 tickets in Italy, 2,917,106 tickets in France, and 2,373,000 tickets in Germany.

Upon its North American release at the Hippodrome Theatre in Baltimore, it set a house record with $30,000 in its first week. Hercules became a major box-office hit. In 1959, it earned $4.7 million from distributor rentals in the United States and Canada. The film went on to earn $5 million in rentals from 24 million ticket sales in North America.

In the Soviet Union, where it released in 1966, the film sold 31.5 million tickets. This adds up to 66,628,922 tickets sold worldwide.

== Merchandise ==
In America, the film generated a Dell comic book adaptation with illustrations by John Buscema and a 33 RPM long-playing RCA Victor recording of the film's soundtrack.

== Mystery Science Theater 3000 episode ==
The Mystery Science Theater 3000 presentation, episode #502, first aired on 18 December 1993, on Comedy Central. Due to the show's practice of editing the film to fit time constraints, characters go from "the midst of one plot development before the commercial ... [to] somewhere else entirely" afterwards.

Although two other MST3K episodes featuring Hercules (Hercules Against the Moon Men, at No. 49, and Hercules Unchained, at No. 61) were ranked in the Top 100 list of episodes as voted upon by MST3K Season 11 Kickstarter backers, Hercules did not make the cut. In his rankings of all 191 MST3K episodes, however, writer Jim Vorel ranked the episode #78, the highest of the four Hercules movies that aired on Comedy Central. "It's a mish-mash of Greek myth," Vorel writes, that is "the most purely entertaining film in the series. ... The total abject devotion of all the other men toward Hercules is naturally hilarious."

The MST3K version of Hercules was included as part of the Mystery Science Theater 3000, Volume XXXII DVD collection, released by Shout! Factory on 24 March 2015. The other episodes in the four-disc set include Space Travelers (episode #401), Radar Secret Service (episode #520), and San Francisco International (episode #614).

== Bibliography ==
- Hughes, Howard (2011). Cinema Italiano – The Complete Guide From Classics To Cult. London - New York: I.B.Tauris. ISBN 978-1-84885-608-0.

== See also ==
- List of films featuring Hercules
