= 67th Locarno Film Festival =

Film festival in Locarno, Switzerland

- Opening film: Lucy directed by Luc Besson
- Location: Locarno, Switzerland
- Founded: 1946
- Awards: Golden Leopard: From What Is Before directed by Lav Diaz
- Artistic director: Carlo Chatrian
- Festival date: Opening: 6 August 2014; Closing: 16 August 2014
- Website: LFF

Locarno Film Festival
- 68th 66th

The 67th Locarno Film Festival was held from 6 to 16 August 2014 in Locarno, Switzerland. There were 17 films in the main competition. The opening film, held on Piazza Grande the 8,000 seat open-air theater, was Lucy directed by Luc Besson. There was a retrospective for film studio Titanus, which has featured directors such as Federico Fellini, Luchino Visconti, Mario Bava and Riccardo Freda. The vision award was given to Garrett Brown, the inventor of the Steadicam.

The Leopard of Honor was awarded to Agnes Varda for her career in cinema. The festival's also wanted to award Roman Polanski a lifetime achievement award and invited him to host a master class with his new film. The decision to award Polanski, who is still wanted by the U.S. government for statutory-rape charges, was met with condemnation from the public, the media, and politicians. The Swiss Democratic Party even issued a statement asking its members to refuse to be part of any ceremony recognizing Polanski. Festival director Carlo Chatrian defended his decision to invite Polanksi on artistic grounds and said, "Polanski's not a pedophile." The uproar ultimately caused Polanski to not attend the festival or collect the award.

The Golden Leopard, the festival's top prize, was awarded to From What Is Before directed by Lav Diaz. The film was noted for being over 5 and a half hours long, with a 338-minute run-time.

== Official Jury ==
=== Main Competition - (Concorso Internazionale) ===
- Gianfranco Rosi, Italian director and documentarian
- Alice Braga, Brazilian actress and producer
- Connie Nielsen, Danish actress
- Thomas Arslan, German-Turkish film director.
- Diao Yinan, Chinese director, screenwriter

== Official Sections ==
The following films were screened in these sections:

=== Piazza Grande ===
The following films were screened in the Piazza Grande section:

Piazza Grande: Prefestival

Original Title	English Title	Director(s)	Year	Production Country
Les Quatre Cents Coups	The 400 Blows	François Truffaut	1959	France
Raiders of the Lost Ark		Steven Spielberg	1981	USA

Piazza Grande

English Title	Original Title	Director(s)	Year	Production Country
A Hitman's Solitude Before The Shot		Florian Mischa Böder	2014	Germany
Dancing Arabs		Eran Riklis	2014	Israel
Geronimo		Tony Gatlif	2014	France
Tour de Force	Hin Und Weg	Christian Zübert	2014	Germany
The Leopard	Il Gattopardo	Luchino Visconti	1963	Italy
Venus in Fur	La Vénus À La Fourrure	Roman Polanski	2013	France
Land Ho!		Aaron Katz, Martha Stephens	2014	USA
The Beaches of Agnès	Les Plages D'Agnès	Agnès Varda	2008	France
Love Island		Jasmila Žbanić	2014	Croatia
Lucy		Luc Besson	2014	France
Marie's Story	Marie Heurtin	Jean-Pierre Améris	2014	France
One Hour Photo		Mark Romanek	2002	USA
Pause		Mathieu Urfer	2014	Switzerland
Unlikely Heroes	Schweizer Helden	Peter Luisi	2014	Switzerland
Clouds of Sils Maria		Olivier Assayas	2014	France
The Hundred-Foot Journey		Lasse Hallström	2014	USA
To Life	À La Vie	Jean-Jacques Zilbermann	2014	France

=== International Competition ===
The following films were screened in the International Competition:

Highlighted title indicates Golden Leopard winner:

English Title	Original Title	Director(s)	Production Country
A Blast		Syllas Tzoumerkas	Greece
Alive		Park Jung-bum	South Korea
Horse Money	Cavalo Dinheiro	Pedro Costa	Portugal
Cure - The Life Of Another		Andrea Štaka	Switzerland
Two Shots Fired	Dos Disparos	Martín Rejtman	Argentina
The Fool	Durak	Yuri Bykov	Russia
Fidelio: Alice's Odyssey	Fidelio, L'Odyssée D'Alice	Lucie Borleteau	France
Gyeongju		Zhang Lu	South Korea
The Princess of France	La Princesa De Francia	Matías Piñeiro	Argentina
La Sapienza		Eugène Green	France
Listen Up Philip		Alex Ross Perry	USA
The Shelter	L'Abri	Fernand Melgar	Switzerland
From What Is Before	Mula Sa Kung Ano Ang Noon	Lav Diaz	Philippines
White Nights on the Pier	Nuits Blanches Sur La Jetée	Paul Vecchiali	France
Perfidia		Bonifacio Angius	Italy
The Iron Ministry		J. P. Sniadecki	China
August Winds	Ventos De Agosto	Gabriel Mascaro	Brazil

=== Filmmakers of the Present ===
The Concorso Cineasti del Presente, also known as the Filmmakers of the Present Competition, showcases first and second feature films from emerging filmmakers. The following films were screened in the Filmmakers of the Present Competition:

Filmmakers of the Present

Original Title	English Title	Director(s)	Production Country
Buzzard		Joel Potrykus	USA
Christmas, Again		Charles Poekel	USA
Exit		CHIENN Hsiang	Taiwan
Frère Et Sœur	Sibling	Daniel Touati	France
Hold Your Breath Like A Lover		IGARASHI Kohei	Japan
La Creazione Di Significato	The Creation of Meaning	Simone Rapisarda Casanova	Canada
Lelaki Harapan Dunia	The Man of the World's Hope	Seng Tat Liew	Malaysia
Los Enemigos Del Dolor	The Enemies of Pain	Arauco Hernandez	Uruguay
Los Hongos	Fungi	Oscar Ruiz Navia	Colombia
Navajazo	NAZAZO	Ricardo Silva	Mexico
Sae-Chul-Bal		JANG Woo-jin	South Korea
Songs From The North		Soon-mi YOO	USA
Sud Eau Nord Déplacer	South North Water Move	Antoine Boutet	France
They Chased Me Through Arizona		Matthias Huser	Switzerland
Un Jeune Poète	A Young Poet	Damien Manivel	France

=== Out of Competition ===
Out of Competition: Feature Films

Original Title	English Title	Director(s)	Year	Production Country
Adieu Au Langage	Farewell to Language	Jean-Luc Godard	2014	France
Creep		Patrick Brice	2014	USA
Dang An		Zhu Rikun	2014	China
Homo Faber (Trois Femmes)	Homo Faber (Three Women)	Richard Dindo	2014	Switzerland
Kommunisten	Communist	Jean-Marie Straub	2014	France
Le Temps Perdu	Lost Time	Pierre Schoeller	2014	France
Lisbon Revisited		Edgar Pêra	2014	Portugal
Parole De Kamikaze	Paro and Divine Wind	Masa SAWADA	2014	France
Sul Vulcano	On the Volcano	Gianfranco Pannone	2014	Italy
Yalom'S Cure		Sabine Gisiger	2014	Switzerland

Out of Competition: Shorts

Original Title	English Title	Director(s)	Year	Production Country
Cutaway		Kazik Radwanski	2014	Canada
Dialogue D'Ombres	Shadow Dialogue	Danièle Huillet, Jean-Marie Straub		France
Poder Dos Afetos	Power of Affections	Helena Ignez Mello	2014	Brazil
The Tony Longo Trilogy		Thom Andersen	2014	USA
À Propos De Venise	About Venice	Jean-Marie Straub	2013	France

=== Open Doors ===
The following films were screened in the Open Doors section:

Open Doors: Special Program

Original Title	English Title	Director(s)	Year	Production Country
Difret	Deprive	Zeresenay Berhane Mehari	2014	Ethiopia

Open Doors: Screenings

Original Title	English Title	Director(s)	Year	Production Country
Ezra		Newton Aduaka	2007	Nigeria
Fools		Ramadan Suleman	1997	South Africa
Half of a Yellow Sun		Biyi Bandele	2013	Nigeria
Heritage Africa		Kwaw Ansah	1989	Ghana
Mapantsula		Oliver Schmitz	1988	South Africa
Mueda, Memória e Massacre	Mueda, Memory and Massacre	Ruy Guerra	1979	Mozambico
Nelisita	And the Site	Ruy Duarte de Carvalho	1983	Angola
Nelson Mandela: The Myth & Me		Khalo Matabane	2014	South Africa
Por Aqui Tudo Bem	All Is Well	Pocas Pascoal	2011	Angola
Saikati		Anne Gaudencia Mungai	1992	Kenya
Shirley Adams		Oliver Hermanus	2009	South Africa
Something Necessary		Judy Kibinge	2013	Kenya
Testament		John Akomfrah	1988	Ghana
Teza		Haile Gerima	2008	Ethiopia
Zamora		Shamshudin Bhanji	2012	Tanzania

Open Doors: Shorts

Original Title	English Title	Director(s)	Year	Production Country
African Metropolis: Berea		Vincent Moloi	2013	South Africa
African Metropolis: Homecoming		Jim Chuchu	2013	Kenya
African Metropolis: The Line-Up		Folasakin Iwajomo	2013	Nigeria
African Tales: Mawazo	African Tales: Ideas	Nina Mnaya	2008	Tanzania
African Tales: The Business Trip		Neema Kambona	2008	Tanzania
Al Mahatta	Importance	Eltayeb Mahdi	1989	Sudan
Arusi Ya Mariamu	The Wedding of Mary	Ron Mulvihill, Nangayoma Ng'oge	1985	Tanzania
Jemima & Johnny		Lionel N'Gakane	1966	South Africa
Kwaku Ananse		Akosua Adoma Owusu	2013	Ghana
Pumzi		Wanuri Kahiu	2009	Kenya

=== Leopards of Tomorrow ===
The following films were screened in the Leopards of Tomorrow (Pardi di Domani) section:

==== Special Program ====
Special Program - Leopards of Tomorrow
Original title	English title	Director(s)	Year	Production country
Kabardino-Balkarian State University: Aleksandr Sokurov Teaching Cinema		Kantemir Balagov, Vladimir Bitokov, Anzor Dokhov, Gadzhimurad Efendiev, Maryama Kalmykova, Mariana Kazancheva, Kira Kovalenko, Tina Mastafova, Malika Musaeva	2013	Russia

==== International Competition ====
International Competition - Leopards of Tomorrow
Original Title	English Title	Director(s)	Year	Production Country
Abandoned Goods		Pia Borg, Edward Lawrenson	2014	Great Britain
Allt Vi Delar	Everything We Share	Jerry Carlsson	2014	Sweden
An Hun Qu	An Hu u	WEN Mu Ye	2014	China
Cai Putere	Horsepower	Daniel Sandu	2014	Romania
Helix Aspersa	Helix Sprayed	Grégoire Graesslin	2014	France
Hole		Martin Edralin	2014	Canada
Ii (Two)		Efthimis Kosemund Sanidis	2014	Greece
Kookaburra Love		Sjoerd Oostrik	2013	Netherlands
La Baracca	The Shack	Alessandro De Leo, Federico Di Corato	2014	Italy
Los Invencibles	The Invincible	Javier Barbero, Martin Guerra	2014	Spain
Lystopad		Masha Kondakova	2014	Ukraina
Matka Ziemia	Mother Earth	Piotr Zlotorowicz	2014	Poland
Muerte Blanca	White Death	Roberto Collio	2014	Chile
O Bom Comportamento	The Good Behavior	Eva Randolph	2014	Brazil
Pussy Have The Power		Lovisa Siren	2014	Sweden
Rooli	Role	Jenni Kangasniemi, Elli Toivoniemi	2014	Finland
San Siro		Yuri Ancarani	2014	Italy
Ser E Voltar	Be and Back	Xacio Baño	2014	Spain
Sertres		Ainara Vera	2014	Spain
Shipwreck		Morgan Knibbe	2014	Netherlands
Single Stream		Ernst Karel, Toby Lee, Pawel Wojtasik	2013	USA
Sleeping Giant		Andrew Cividino	2014	Canada
Tahtt Al-Khazzan	Under the Tank	Orwa Al Mokdad, Eyas Almokdad	2014	Syria
Thirst		Rachel McDonald	2014	USA
Triukšmadarys	Noiseman	Karolis Kaupinis	2014	Lithuania
Unnatural History		Alex Backhouse	2014	New Zealand
Višak Vjetra	Excess Wind	Dane Komljen	2014	France

==== National Competition ====
National Competition - Leopards of Tomorrow
Original title	English title	Director(s)	Year	Production country
Abseits Der Autobahn	Away from the Highway	Rhona Mühlebach	2014	Switzerland
Aubade		Mauro Carraro	2014	Switzerland
Die Hälfte Der Welt	Half of the World	Jérôme Furrer	2014	Switzerland
Le Mal Du Citron	Lemon Evil	Jeremy Rosenstein, Kaspar Schiltknecht	2014	Switzerland
Le Miel Est Plus Doux Que Le Sang	Honey is Softer than Blood	Colia Vranici	2014	Switzerland
Orages D'Été	Summer Storms	Nadège De Benoit-Luthy	2014	Switzerland
Peau	Skin	Marine Koenig	2014	Belgium
Petit Homme	Little Man	Jean-guillaume Sonnier	2014	Switzerland
Prose Du Transsibérien	Trans -Siberian Prose	David Epiney	2014	Switzerland
Totems		Sarah Arnold	2014	France

=== Signs of Life ===
The following films were screened in the Signs of Life section:

Original Title	English Title	Director(s)	Year	Production Country
Al-Rakib Al-Khaled	Immortal	Ziad Kalthoum	2013	Syria
Amori E Metamorfosi	Loves and Metamorphoses	Yanira Yariv	2014	France
Antigona Despierta	Antigona Wakes Up	Lupe Perez García	2014	Spain
Com Os Punhos Cerrados	With the Fists Clenched	Pedro Diogenes, Ricardo Pretti, Luiz Pretti	2014	Brazil
El Escarabajo De Oro	The Gold Beetle	Alejo Moguillansky, Fia-Stina Sandlund	2014	Argentina
Favula	Favorite	Raúl Perrone	2014	Argentina
Fils De	Son of	HPG	2014	France
Fort Buchanan		Benjamin Crotty	2014	France
Los Ausentes	The Absent	Nicolás Pereda	2014	Mexico

=== History (s) of Cinema ===
The festival's Histoire(s) du Cinéma section showcases films deemed significant to the evolution of cinema. Films by the festival's career award winners are presented in this section. The following films were screened in the Histoire(s) du Cinéma section:

Histoire(s) du Cinéma
Original Title	English Title	Director(s)	Year	Production Country
Copacabana Mon Amour		Rogério Sganzerla	1970	Brazil
Gli Incubi Di Dario Argento	The Nightmares of Dario Argento	Dario Argento	1987	Italy
Pris Dans Le Tourbillon	Taken in the Whirlwind		2014	Switzerland
Remains		Pierre Léon	2014	World
Remake, Remix, Ripoff		Cem Kaya	2014	Germany
Sokurovin Ääni	Sokurov's Voice	Leena Kilpeläinen	2014	Finland
Sosialismi	Socialism	Peter von Bagh	2014	Finland
Leopard Club Award Mia Farrow
Rosemary's Baby		Roman Polanski	1968	USA
Modern Times
Modern Times		Charlie Chaplin	1936	USA
Tribute to Carlo Varini
Matlosa	The Homeless One	Villi Hermann	1981	Switzerland
Tribute to Harun Farocki
Bilder Der Welt Und Inschrift Des Krieges	Pictures of the World and Inscription of the War	Harun Farocki	1988	Repubblica Federale Tedesca
Tribute to Li Han-Hsiang
Dong Nuan	Don GNUP	LI Han-hsiang	1969	Taiwan
Feng Yue Qi Tan	F-Yu EQ IT Press	LI Han-hsiang	1972	Hong Kong
Hsi Nou Ai Le	Hsi New you Have Them	King HU, LI Han-hsiang, LEE Hsing, BAI Jingrui	1970	Taiwan
Jiang Shan Mei Ren	Jiang s Korean Meir	LI Han-hsiang	1958	Hong Kong
Tribute To Lauren Bacall
The Big Sleep		Howard Hawks	1946	USA
Career Leopard Jean-Pierre Léaud
La Maman Et La Putain	The Mother and the Whore	Jean Eustache	1973	France
Le Pornographe	The Pornographer	Bertrand Bonello	2001	France
Les Deux Anglaises Et Le Continent	Two English Girls	François Truffaut	1971	France
Masculin Féminin		Jean-Luc Godard	1966	France
Career Leopard Víctor Erice
Alumbramiento	Delivery	Víctor Erice	2002	Spain
Correspondencia Víctor Erice – Abbas Kiarostami	Correspondence Víctor Erice - Abbas Kiarostami	Víctor Erice		Spain
El Espiritu De La Colmena	The Spirit of the Hive	Víctor Erice	1973	Spain
El Sol Del Membrillo	THE SUN of the MEGRILLO	Víctor Erice	1992	Spain
El Sur	The South	Víctor Erice	1983	Spain
La Morte Rouge	The Red Dead	Víctor Erice	2006	Spain
Vidros Partidos	Party Glass	Víctor Erice	2012	Portugal
Swiss Cinema Rediscovered
Alexandre		Jean-François Amiguet, Anne Gonthier	1983	Switzerland
Au 10 Août	August 10	Jean-François Amiguet	1986	Switzerland
Gilberte De Courgenay		Franz Schnyder	1941	Switzerland

=== Films of the Juries ===
The following films were screened in the Films of the Juries section:

Filmmakers of the Present Jury
Original Title	English Title	Director(s)	Year	Production Country
Conte D'Automne	Fall Tale	Éric Rohmer	1998	France
Jeanne Captive	The Silence of Joan	Philippe Ramos	2011	France
Last Night		Don McKellar	1998	Canada
Ma'A Al-Fidda	Mosque Al-a	Ossama Mohammed, Wiam Simav Bedirxan	2014	Syria
International Competition Jury
Bai Ri Yan Huo	Black Coal, Thin Ice	Diao Yinan	2014	China
Demonlover		Olivier Assayas	2002	France
El Sicario, Room 164		Gianfranco Rosi	2010	France
Gold		Thomas Arslan	2013	Germany
Latitudes		Felipe Braga	2014	Brazil
Leopards of Tomorrow Jury
Costa Da Morte	Costa Da Death	Lois Patiño	2013	Spain
Girimunho	Swirl	Clarissa Campolina, Helvécio Marins Jr	2011	Brazil
La Leggenda Del Santo Bevitore	The Legend of the Holy Drinker	Ermanno Olmi	1988	Italy
Montaña En Sombra	Shadow Mountain	Lois Patiño	2012	Spain
Plemya	The Tribe	Myroslav Slaboshpytskyi	2014	Ukraina

=== Retrospective – Titanus ===
The following films were screened in the Retrospective to Titanus section:

Original Title	English Title	Director(s)	Year	Production Country
Amore Mio	My Love	Raffaello Matarazzo	1964	Italy
Anonima Cocottes		Camillo Mastrocinque	1960	Italy
Antinea, L'Amante Della Città Sepolta	Antinea, the Lover of the Buried City	Frank Borzage, Giuseppe Masini, Edgar G. Ulmer	1961	Italy
Banditi A Orgosolo	Bandits in Orgosolo	Vittorio De Seta	1961	Italy
Buon Natale Buon Anno	Merry Christmas Happy New Year	Luigi Comencini	1989	Italy
Casa Mia, Donna Mia...	My House, My Woman ...	Charles Krauss	1923	Italy
Catene	Chains	Raffaello Matarazzo	1949	Italy
Cronaca Familiare	Family News	Valerio Zurlini	1962	Italy
Cronaca Nera	Cronaca Black	Giorgio Bianchi	1947	Italy
Dolci Inganni	Sweet Deceptions	Alberto Lattuada	1960	Italy
Estate Violenta	Violent Summer	Valerio Zurlini	1959	Italy
Giorni Di Gloria	Days of Glory	Giuseppe De Santis, Marcello Pagliero, Mario Serandrei, Luchino Visconti	1945	Italy
I Fidanzati	The Fiances	Ermanno Olmi	1963	Italy
I Figli Di Nessuno	Nobody's Children	Raffaello Matarazzo	1951	Italy
I Giorni Contati	The Days Counted	Elio Petri	1962	Italy
I Magliari	The Shirts	Francesco Rosi	1959	Italy
I Vampiri	The Vampires	Riccardo Freda	1957	Italy
Il bidone	The Swindle	Federico Fellini	1955	Italy
Il Demonio	The Devil	Brunello Rondi	1964	Italy
Il Giorno Più Corto	The Shortest Day	Sergio Corbucci	1963	Italy
Il Sole Negli Occhi	Empty Eyes	Antonio Pietrangeli	1953	Italy
Il Tallone Di Achille	Achille's Heel	Mario Amendola, Ruggero Maccari	1952	Italy
La Battaglia Di Maratona	The Battle of Marathon	Mario Bava, Jacques Tourneur, Bruno Vailati	1959	Italy
La Carne E L'Anima	The Meat and the Soul	Wladimir Strichewsky	1945	Italy
La Ciociara	Two Women	Vittorio De Sica	1961	Italy
La Corruzione	Corruption	Alessandro Bolognini	1963	Italy
La Frusta E Il Corpo	The Whisk and the Body	Mario Bava	1963	Italy
La Legge Della Tromba	The Law of the Trumpet	Augusto Tretti	1962	Italy
La Madonna Di Pompei A Napoli	The Madonna of Pompeii in Naples	anonimo	1948	Italy
La Prima Notte Di Quiete	Indian Summer	Valerio Zurlini	1972	Italy
La Ragazza Con La Valigia	The Girl with the Suitcase	Valerio Zurlini	1961	Italy
La Spiaggia	The Beach	Alberto Lattuada	1954	Italy
Le Amiche		Michelangelo Antonioni	1955	Italy
Lo Sciopero Dei Milioni	The Strike of the Millions	Raffaello Matarazzo	1947	Italy
L'Angelo Bianco	The White Angel	Raffaello Matarazzo	1955	Italy
L'Uccello Dalle Piume Di Cristallo	The Bird with Crystal Feathers	Dario Argento	1970	Italy
L'Ultimo Gattopardo	The Last Leopard	Giuseppe Tornatore	2010	Italy
Maddalena		Augusto Genina	1954	Italy
Maria Denis E Le Sue Prigioni	Maria Denis and Her Prisons	Giorgio Bianchi	1948	Italy
Non Stuzzicate La Zanzara	Don't Tease the Mosquito	Lina Wertmüller	1967	Italy
Pane Amore E Fantasia	Bread Love and Fantasy	Luigi Comencini	1953	Italy
Pane Amore E Gelosia	Bread Love and Jealousy	Luigi Comencini	1954	Italy
Poveri Ma Belli	Poor, But Handsome	Dino Risi	1956	Italy
Prossimamente...Titanus - Una Storia Lungo I Trailer	Soon ... Titanus - A Story along the Trailers		2014	Italy
Scuola Elementare	Elementary School	Alberto Lattuada	1954	Italy
Siamo Donne	We are Women	Gianni Franciolini, Alfredo Guarini, Roberto Rossellini, Luchino Visconti, Luigi Zampa	1953	Italy
Tormento	Torment	Raffaello Matarazzo	1950	Italy
Torna!		Raffaello Matarazzo	1954	Italy
Totò Lascia O Raddoppia?	Totò Leave or Double?	Camillo Mastrocinque	1956	Italy
Trappola	Trap	Eugenio Perego	1922	Italy
Tuppe Tuppe, Marescià!	In the Vagina, Marescià!	Carlo Ludovico Bragaglia	1958	Italy
Un Eroe Dei Nostri Tempi	A Hero of Our Times	Mario Monicelli	1955	Italy
Uomini E Lupi	The Wolves	Giuseppe De Santis	1957	Italy

=== Special Prizes ===
The following films were screened for Special Prizes:

Excellence Award Moët & Chandon Giancarlo Giannini
Original Title	English Title	Director(s)	Year	Production Country
Lili Marleen	Lili Marleen	Rainer Werner Fassbinder	1980	Repubblica Federale Tedesca
Excellence Award Moët & Chandon Juliette Binoche
Copie Conforme	Certified Copy	Abbas Kiarostami	2010	France
Trois Couleurs: Bleu	Three Colours: Blue	Krzysztof Kieślowski	1993	France
Lifetime Achievement Award Parmigiani Armin Mueller-Stahl
Lola		Rainer Werner Fassbinder	1981	Repubblica Federale Tedesca
Shine		Scott Hicks	1996	Australia
Utz		George Sluizer	1992	Great Britain
Raimondo Rezzonico Nansun Shi Prize
Di Renjie: Shen Du Long Wang		Tsui Hark	2013	China
Shun Liu Ni Liu	Time and Tide	Tsui Hark	2000	Hong Kong
Sun Lung Moon Hak Chan		Raymond LEE	1992	Hong Kong
Vision Award - Garrett Brown
Bound for Glory		Hal Ashby	1976	USA
Rocky		John G. Avildsen	1976	USA
The Shining		Stanley Kubrick	1980	Great Britain
Wolfen		Michael Wadleigh	1981	USA
Leopard of Honor Swisscom – Agnès Varda
Agnès De Ci De Là Varda	Agnès Varda From Here to There	Agnès Varda	2011	France
Cléo De 5 À 7	Cléo from 5 to 7	Agnès Varda	1961	France
Documenteur		Agnès Varda	1980	USA
Les Créatures	Creatures	Agnès Varda	1965	France
Les Glaneurs Et La Glaneuse	The Gleaners and I	Agnès Varda	2000	France
Lions Love (...And Lies)		Agnès Varda	1969	USA
Oncle Yanco	Uncle Yanco	Agnès Varda	1967	USA
Sans Toit Ni Loi	Vagabond	Agnès Varda	1985	France

== Independent Sections ==
=== Critics Week ===
The Semaine de la Critique is an independent section, created in 1990 by the Swiss Association of Film Journalists in partnership with the Locarno Film Festival. The following films were screened in the Critics Week section:

Original Title	English Title	Director(s)	Production Country
15 Corners Of The World		Zuzanna Solakiewicz	Poland
Broken Land		Stephanie Barbey, Luc Peter	Switzerland
Electroboy		Marcel Gisler	Switzerland
La Mort Du Dieu Serpent	The Death of the Serpent God	Damien Froidevaux	France
Ming Tian Hui Geng Hao	Min GTI Press Hui Gen GH	Hongjie XU	Germany
Mulhapar	Mullapar	Paolo Poloni	Switzerland
The Stranger		Neasa Ni Chianain	Ireland

=== Swiss Panorama ===
The following films were screened in the Swiss Panorama section:

Swiss Panorama
Original Title	English Title	Director(s)	Year	Production Country
Der Goalie Bin Ig	The Goalie Bin Ig	Sabine Boss	2014	Switzerland
El Tiempo Nublado	The Cloudy Weather	Arami Ullón	2014	Switzerland
Je Suis Femen	I'm Femen	Alain Margot	2014	Switzerland
Mon Père, La Révolution Et Moi	My Father, the Revolution and Me	Ufuk Emiroglu	2013	Switzerland
Montauk		Vinz Feller	2013	Switzerland
Nebel	Fog	Nicole Vögele	2014	Germany
Patch		Gerd Gockell	2014	Switzerland
Sleepless in New York		Christian Frei	2013	Switzerland
Style Wars 2		Amos Angeles, Veli Silver	2013	Switzerland
Thuletuvalu		Matthias von Gunten	2014	Switzerland
Traumland	Dreamland	Petra Volpe	2013	Switzerland
Viktoria – A Tale Of Grace And Greed		Men Lareida	2014	Switzerland

== Official Awards ==
=== International Competition (Concorso Internazionale) ===
- Pardo d'oro: Mula Sa Kung Ano Ang Noon directed by Lav Diaz
- Premio speciale della giuria (Special Jury Prize): Listen Up Philip directed by Alex Ross Perry
- Pardo per la miglior regia (Best Director): Pedro Costra for the film CAVALO DINHEIRO
- Pardo per la miglior interpretazione femminile (Best Actress): Ariane Labed in Fidelio, LOdyssée DAlice directed by Lucie Borleteau
- Pardo per la miglior interpretazione maschile (Best Actor): Artem Bystrov in Durak by Yury Bykov
- Special Mention (Concorso internazionale): Ventos De Agosto directed by Gabriel Mascaro

=== Filmmakers of the Present Competition (Concorso Cineasti del presente) ===
- Pardo d'oro Cineasti del presente – Premio Nescens: Navajazo directed by Ricardo Silva
- Premio per il miglior regista emergente (best emerging director): Simone Rapisarda Casanova for the film LA CREAZIONE DI SIGNIFICATO
- Premio speciale della giuria Ciné+ Cineasti del presente: Los Hongos directed by Oscar Ruiz Navia
- Special Mention (Concorso Cineasti del presente): A Young Poet (Un jeune poète) directed by Damien Manivel

=== Opera Prima Jury ===
- Pardo per la migliore opera prima (Best First Feature): Songs From The North directed by Soon-mi YOO
- Special Mention (Opera Prima Jury): Parole Da Kamikaze directed by Masa Sawada

=== Leopards of Tomorrow (Pardi di Domani) ===
- Pardino d'oro for the Best international Short Film – Premio SRG SSR: Adandoned Goods directed by Pia Borg and Edward Lawrenson
- Pardino d'argento SRG SSR (Concorso internazionale): Shipwreck directed by Morgan Knibbe
- Special Mention (Pardi di domani – Concorso internazionale): Muerte Blanca directed by Roberto Collio
- Locarno short film nominee for the European Film Awards – Premio Pianifica: Shipwreck directed by Morgan Knibbe
- The Film und Video Untertitelung Prize: Hole directed by Martin Edralin
- Pardino d'oro for the Best Swiss Short Film – Premio Swiss Life: Totems directed by Sarah Arnold
- Pardino d'argento Swiss Life (Concorso nazionale): Petit Homme directed by Jean-Guillaume Sonnier
- Action Light Prize for the Best Swiss Newcomer: Abseits Der Autobahn directed by Rhona Mühlebach

=== Piazza Grande ===
- Prix du Public UBS: Schweizer Helden directed by Peter Luisi
- Variety Piazza Grande Award: Marie Heurtin directed by Jean-Pierre Améris

=== Junior Jury – Concorso internazionale ===
- First Prize (Junior Jury – Concorso internazionale): Durak directed by Yuri Bykov
- Second Prize (Junior Jury – Concorso internazionale): Alive directed by Jung-Bum PARK
- Third Prize (Junior Jury – Concorso internazionale): Perfidia directed by Bonifacio Angius
- "Environment is quality of life" (Giuria dei giovani – Concorso internazionale): Mula Sa Kung Ano Ang Noon directed by Lav Diaz
- Special mention Giuria dei giovani – Concorso internazionale: L'Abri directed by Fernand Melgar

=== Junior Jury – Cineasti del presente ===
- Junior Jury Prize – Concorso Cineasti del presente: FrÈRe Et SŒUr directed by Daniel Touati
- Special Mention (Junior Jury – Concorso Cineasti del presente): Buzzard directed by Joel Potrykus

=== Junior Jury – Pardi di domani ===
- Junior Jury special mention – Pardi di domani: Matka Ziemia directed by Piotr Zlotorowicz
- Junior Jury Prize – Pardi di domani (Concorso internazionale): Sleeping Giant directed by Andrew Cividino
- Junior Jury Prize – Pardi di domani (Concorso nazionale): Abseits Der Autobahn directed by Rhona Mühlebach

=== FIPRESCI Jury ===
- International Critics' Prize (FIPRESCI Prize): Mula Sa Kung Ano Ang Noon directed by Lav Diaz

=== Europa Cinemas Label Jury ===
- Premio Europa Cinemas Label: Fidelio, LOdyssée DAlice directed by Lucie Borleteau

=== FICC/IFFS Jury ===
- Don Quijote Prize: Mula Sa Kung Ano Ang Noon directed by Lav Diaz
- Special Mention (FICC/IFFS Jury): Durak directed by Yuri Bykov, Cavalo Dinheiro directed by Pedro Costa

=== SRG SSR idée suisse / Semaine de la critique Jury ===
- SRG SSR / Semaine de la critique Prize: La Mort Du Dieu Serpent directed by Damien Froidevaux, 15 Corners Of The World directed by Zuzanna Solakiewicz
- Premio Zonta Club Locarno: La Mort Du Dieu Serpent directed by Damien Froidevaux
