= Vortice =

- Directed by: Raffaello Matarazzo
- Written by: Sandro Continenza; Aldo De Benedetti; Ennio De Concini; Raffaello Matarazzo
- Produced by: Lux Film
- Starring: Massimo Girotti; Silvana Pampanini
- Cinematography: Rodolfo Lombardi
- Edited by: Mario Serandrei
- Music by: Annibale Bizzelli
- Release date: 13 November 1953
- Language: Italian

Vortice (i.e. "Vortex") is a 1953 Italian melodrama film directed by Raffaello Matarazzo and starring Massimo Girotti and Silvana Pampanini.

== Cast ==
- Massimo Girotti as Guido Aureli
- Silvana Pampanini as Elena Fanti
- Franco Fabrizi as Viaggiani
- Gianni Santuccio as Luigi Moretti
- Maria Grazia Sandri as Anna
- Paolo Ferrara as Cesare Fanti
- Giorgio Capecchi as Police Commissioner
- Irene Papas as Clara
- Nino Marchesini as Defense Attorney
- Dina Perbellini as Nursing Sister
- Amina Pirani Maggi as Guardian of the Prison
- Gualtiero De Angelis as Police Inspector
- Giuseppe Chinnici as Doctor
- Aldo Silvani as Head of the Hospital
- Bella Starace Sainati as Old Nun
