= Noi peccatori =

1953 film by Guido Brignone

- Directed by: Guido Brignone
- Written by: Guido Brignone; Alessandro De Stefani; Carlo Musso
- Story by: Decio Fittaioli
- Produced by: Titanus
- Starring: Yvonne Sanson
- Cinematography: Mario Montuori
- Edited by: Mario Serandrei
- Music by: Renzo Rossellini
- Distributed by: Titanus
- Release date: 21 March 1953
- Language: Italian

Noi peccatori (i.e. "We, sinners") is a 1953 Italian melodrama film directed by Guido Brignone and starring Yvonne Sanson.

== Cast ==
- Yvonne Sanson as Lucia
- Steve Barclay as Stefano
- Tamara Lees as Fausta
- Carletto Sposito as Francesco
- Marc Lawrence as Camillo
- Evi Maltagliati as Lucia's Mother
- Bella Starace Sainati as Donna Assunta
- Gualtiero Tumiati as Don Quirino
- Aldo Silvani as Don Antonio
- Mario Ferrari as Rinaldi
- Turi Pandolfini as Collega
- Teresa Franchini as First Nun
- Anita Durante as Second Nun
- Nino Marchesini as Hospital Director
- Attilio Dottesio as Doctor
- Sandro Bianchi as Police Commissioner
