= Guai ai vinti =

1954 film

- Directed by: Raffaello Matarazzo
- Written by: Achille Campanile; Raffaello Matarazzo; Mario Monicelli; Piero Pierotti; Giovanna Soria
- Cinematography: Tino Santoni
- Edited by: Mario Serandrei
- Music by: Carlo Franci; Renzo Rossellini
- Release date: 3 November 1954
- Country: Italy
- Language: Italian

Guai ai vinti (Woe to the Vanquished Ones) is a 1954 Italian melodrama film directed by Raffaello Matarazzo. It is based on the novel Vae Victis by Annie Vivanti.

== Plot ==
During the First World War the Italian front at Caporetto is overwhelmed by an attack of adverse troops. Luisa and her sister Clara remain in their villa, prisoners of the Austrians. They are forced to undergo all sorts of violence, so that Mirella, the little daughter of Luisa, lost the use of the word following the trauma.

== Cast ==
- Lea Padovani: Luisa
- Anna Maria Ferrero: Clara
- Pierre Cressoy: Franco
- Clelia Matania: Teresa
- Camillo Pilotto: Bonechi
- Gualtiero Tumiati: Don Marzi
- Rolf Tasna: Claudio
- Paola Quattrini: Mirella
- Giulio Ottavi: Giovanni
- Emilio Cigoli: Pietro
- Mario Del Monaco: Mario Abbate
- Marcella Rovena: Countess Amelia
- Isa Querio: Miss Bonechi
- Bianca Doria: Contadina nel granaio
- Teresa Franchini: Contadina nel granaio
- Anita Durante: Popolana
- Irene Cefaro: Friend of Clara
- Enrico Glori: Viaggiatore
