= The Golden Arrow (1962 film) =

1962 film directed Antonio Margheriti

- American theatrical poster
- Directed by: Antonio Margheriti
- Screenplay by: Giorgio Arlorio; Augusto Frassinetti; Giorgio Prosperi; Filippo Sanjust; Bruno Vailati
- Produced by: Goffredo Lombardo
- Starring: Tab Hunter; Rossana Podesta; Umberto Melnati; Mario Feliciani
- Cinematography: Gábor Pogány
- Edited by: Mario Serandrei
- Music by: Mario Nascimbene
- Color process: Technicolor
- Production company: Titanus
- Distributed by: Metro Goldwyn Mayer
- Release date: 7 September 1962 (Italy)
- Running time: 91 mins
- Country: Italy
- Languages: English; Italian

The Golden Arrow (Italian: L'Arciere delle Mille e Una Notte, lit. 'The Archer of the Thousand and One Nights') is a 1962 Italian peplum film directed by Antonio Margheriti.

== Plot ==
In the city of Damascus, the Grand Vizier Baktiar holds a contest for a noble man to marry Princess Jamila and become sultan if they can bend the black bow and shoot the golden arrow. Hassan, a young bandit, infiltrates the contest with the intent to kidnap Jamila, in which he impersonates the prince from the island of Flames. He easily shoots the arrow but is accused of cheating by Baktiar. Hassan's bandits, led by Sabrath, kidnap and hold Jamila for ransom although Hassan loses the golden arrow.

In the early morning, Hassan and Jamila leave the camp on horseback while Sabrath and the bandits follow them in pursuit. After some time, Hassan has fallen in love with Jamila. At a bazaar, Hassan trades Jamila's ring for a flower. He then releases her, deciding not to hold her for ransom. Baktiar recognizes Jamila's ring and sends men to have Hassan arrested.

Inside the palace dungeon, Baktiar recognizes the birthmark on Hassan's wrist as the same of a prince who was abducted from the palace. He leaves Hassan chained inside the dungeon. Elsewhere, Jamila prays to Allah outside her balcony for Hassan's safety. Immediately, three genies descend from the stars and liberate Hassan. They explain they must restore Hassan as the rightful heir of Damascus as Baktiar had assassinated Hassan's father and usurped the throne. They warn Hassan that if he returns to his thieving ways, his obstacles will be greater.

Hassan escapes the palace to find the lost golden arrow near the mountains. Meanwhile, Jamila holds another contest for three princes to find a valuable object to win her hand in marriage. As Hassan searches for water, he knowingly enters into a cave ruled by a queen. Hasan falls for the queen's seduction, in which the genies reprimand him of disobedience.

Hassan faces another challenge when he arrives at an ancient ruined city, held captive by an old magician. There, the magician tasks him to remove a fallen obelisk guarding a cave of treasures by sunset. Hassan succeeds, though the magician is killed under the debris. A queen holds a banquet in honor of Hassan, and gifts him her treasure when he leaves.

By nightfall, Sabrath and the other bandits locate Hassan and hoist him and the genies onto nearby trees. One of the genies uses his levitating power to overpower Sabrath and the bandits, who then release them. Hassan leaves Sabrath and the bandits to enjoy the treasure.

Back at the palace, Baktiar casts a spell on Jamila, causing her to fall ill. He tips the Prince of Bassora on where to find a vial of life-giving water, which the Prince steals from a soothsayer. The Prince revives Jamila, though she knows he stole the gift. Meanwhile, Hassan locates the golden arrow, and the genies transport him back to the palace. With the golden arrow in hand, Hassan is recognized as the true Sultan.

With the Prince's forces mobilized outside Damascus, he and Baktiar escape on a flying carpet. Hassan is given his own flying carpet and uses the golden arrow to defeat the prince's armies. Baktiar and the prince try once more to escape, in which Hassan uses the arrow to have them lose their balance and fall into a mud pit. Hassan marries Jamila, as they ride together on the flying carpet.

== Cast ==
- Tab Hunter as Hassan
- Rossana Podestà as Jamila
- Mario Feliciani as Baktiar
- Umberto Melnati as Thin Genie
- Giustino Durano as Absent-Minded Genie
- José Jaspe as Sabrath
- Renato Baldini as Prince of Bassora
- Dominique Boschero as Queen of Rocky Valley
- Gloria Milland as Queen in the cave
- Franco Scandurra as Bearded Genie
- Renato Montalban
- Gianpaolo Rosmino as Mokbar
- Claudio Scarchilli as Bandit

== Production ==
Filming took place in Egypt and at Titanus Studios in Rome in late 1961 and into 1962.

Tab Hunter later recalled in his memoirs:

Not being able to speak Italian wasn't a drawback. The script of La Freccia d'Oro - my copy was the only one in English - featured page after page of truly horrendous dialogue... All I could think of was Tony Curtis in The Black Shield of Falworth (1954): "Yonda lies da castle of my fadda." I spend every night in my hotel, rewriting my lines so I'd at least have fun delivering them. I camped it up shamelessly. Not that it mattered - all my dialogue was eventually dubbed by a stiff-as-a-board Italian baritone with no sense of humor. I ended up sounding like Rossano Brazzi. Disappointment over being stuck in a stinker was eased considerably by weekly infusions of cash, delivered personally by the production manager. I'd sign a voucher and he'd hand over a bundle of lire, some of the old notes as big as place mats.

Hunter added, "Considering what he had to work with, Antonio Margheriti wasn't a bad director. He worshipped American movies and didn't seem to care how lousy the material was, as long as he could follow in the boots of his boyhood idols."

== Release ==
The Golden Arrow was released in Italy on September 7, 1962. It was released in the United States in May 1964.

The film was not a box office hit and cost so much money it almost bankrupted Titanus, the production company.

Hunter recalled, "We tried to make script improvements, through an interpreter, but at a certain point I just gave in and accepted that there was no pony under the pile of shit. La Freccia d'Oro's overextended budget ended up sinking Titanus, at least temporarily. "

== Reception ==
From contemporary reviews, an anonymous reviewer in the Monthly Film Bulletin noted that the special effects and trick photography were "of unusually variable quality-distinctly poor in the Egyptian city episode, though spectacular enough in the fiery cavern with the flaming men." and that "the film suffers further from a lack of dash, and from Tab Hunter's weak playing of the hero."

Variety said the film "owing to its lack of dramatic cohesian and rather unimaginative creative approach to the wide open possibilities of special effects spectacle" was not likely to match the box office success of MGM's Captain Sinbad. The reviewer said "Hunter is okay but he does a lot of grinning and gaping."

From retrospective reviews, the author of the book Il grande cinema fantasy described the film as "a typical adventure B-movie, especially interesting for its fantasy elements, which is damaged by the presence of comic elements that do not bind enough with the rest." The film still gained recognition for sporting particularly elaborate sets and costumes.

== See also ==
- List of Italian films of 1962
