= Roberto Murolo =

Italian musician (1912–2003)

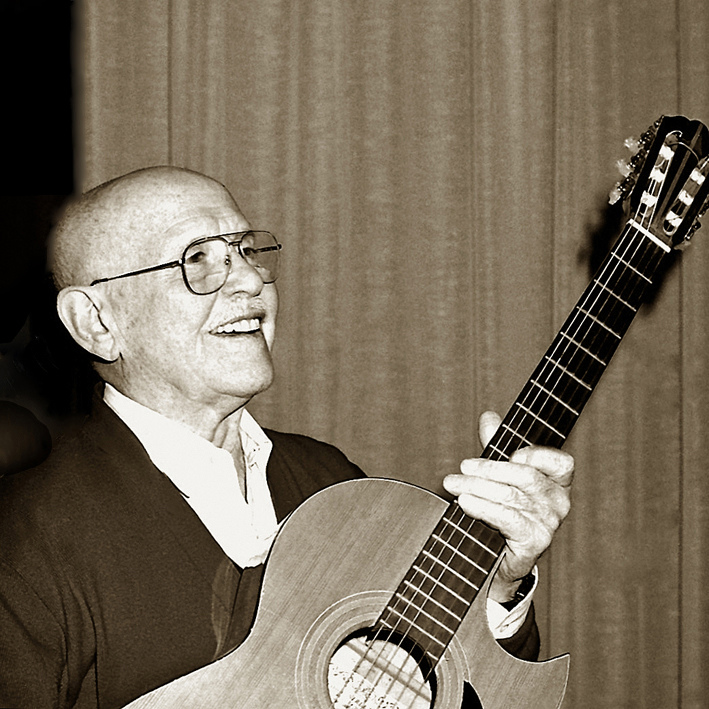
- Roberto Murolo photographed by Augusto De Luca
- Born: 19 January 1912; Naples, Kingdom of Italy
- Died: 13 March 2003 (aged 91); Naples, Italy
- Occupations: Singer; actor; guitarist; songwriter
- Musical career
- Genres: Neapolitan song; folk
- Instruments: Vocals; guitar
- Years active: 1936–1997
- Labels: Bluebell; Produttori Associati; Ricordi; Durium
- Sports career
- Sport: Long-distance swimming; high diving; freediving; spearfishing

Roberto Murolo (Italian pronunciation: [roˈbɛrto ˈmuːrolo]; 19 January 1912 – 13 March 2003) was an Italian musician.

== Career ==
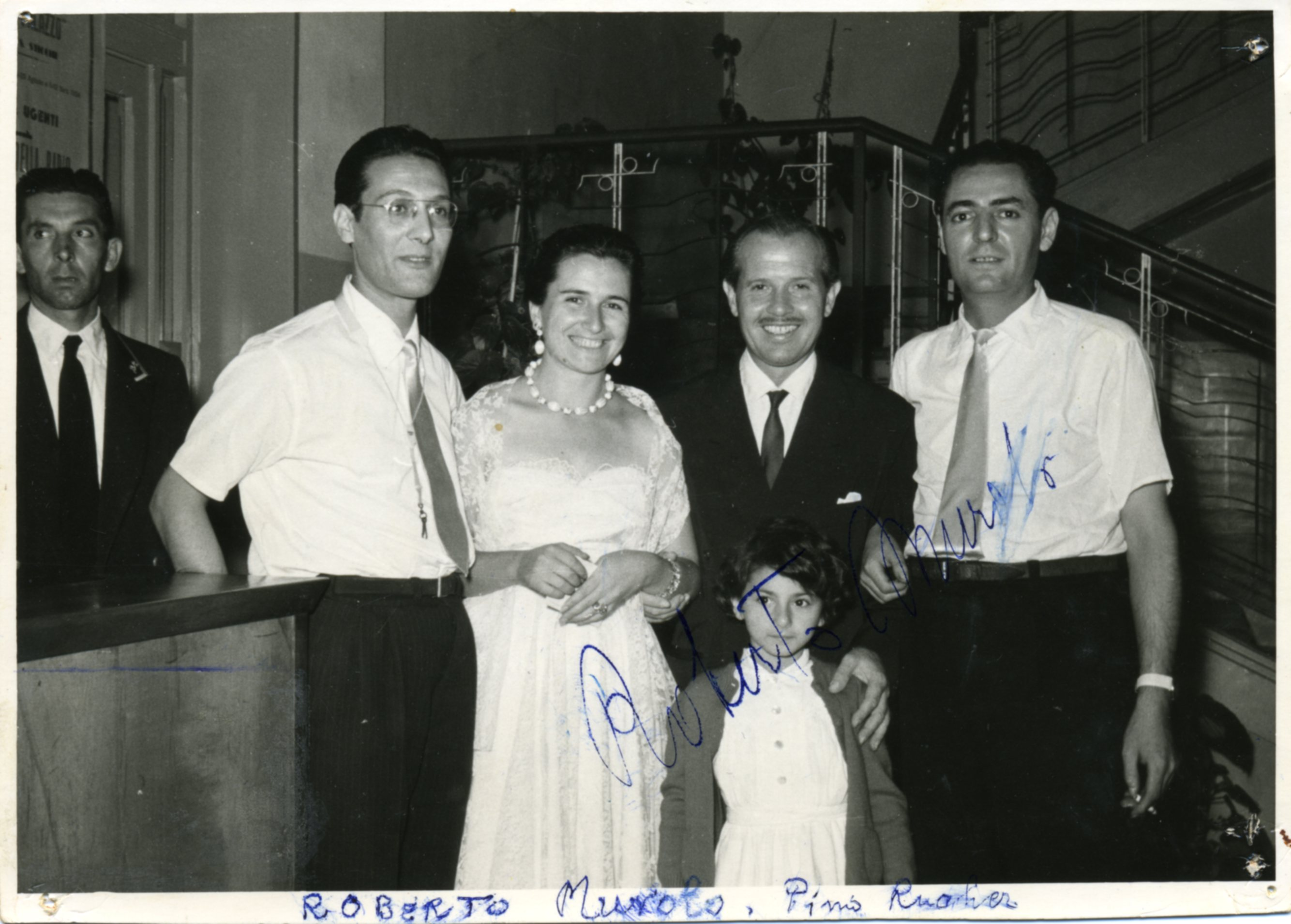
Roberto Murolo and Pino Rucher

Born in Naples, Italy as the son of poet Ernesto Murolo and Lia Cavalli, Murolo showed a passion for music at a young age and began singing and playing the guitar as a child. Murolo won the Italian high diving championship in 1937, and attributed his remarkable lung capacity to the long practice of water sports. At the age of 24 he founded with three friends the "Midas Quartet" (Quartetto Mida), a jazz quartet, with which he performed away from Italy from 1939 through 1946.

His solo career, focused almost exclusively on Neapolitan song, traditional and popular songs, began with his return to Italy in 1946. In addition to establishing himself as a concert artist and a popular figure on radio, with a romantic, sentimental sound, he also did some acting in movies, appearing in the 1953 crime drama The Counterfeiters, made in Italy by director Franco Rossi.

Murolo's collection of twelve LPs of Neapolitan song, called Napoletana. Antologia cronologica della canzone partenopea and released between 1963 and 1965, is an annotated compendium of Neapolitan song dating back to the 12th century. Later he published four monographic albums called I grandi della canzone napoletana, dedicated to Neapolitan poets Salvatore Di Giacomo, Ernesto Murolo, Libero Bovio and E. A. Mario. Murolo's recordings and performances helped popularize Neapolitan song globally. Afterwards he stopped recording, but continued to give concerts. He made a comeback in the 1990s.

He died at his home in Via Cimarosa 25, Naples, which continues to be the headquarters of the "Roberto Murolo Foundation" (Fondazione Roberto Murolo).

== Discography ==
- Na voce, 'na chitarra (1990)
- Ottantavoglia di cantare (1992), includes a duet with Mia Martini
- L'Italia è bbella (1993)
- Tu si' 'na cosa grande (1994)
- Anema e core (1995)
- Roberto Murolo and friends (1995)
- Ho sognato di cantare (2002)

== Filmography ==
- Chains (Catene), directed by Raffaello Matarazzo (1949)
- Il voto, directed by Mario Bonnard (1950)
- Paolo e Francesca, directed by Raffaello Matarazzo (1950)
- Torment (Tormento), directed by Raffaello Matarazzo (1950)
- Three Steps North (Tre passi a nord), directed by W. Lee Wilder (1951)
- Milano miliardaria, directed by Marino Girolami, Marcello Marchesi and Vittorio Metz (1951)
- Falsehood (Menzogna), directed by Ubaldo Maria Del Colle (1952)
- Saluti e baci by Maurice Labro and Giorgio Simonelli (1953)
- I falsari, directed by Franco Rossi (1953)

== Awards ==
- Premio ufficiale della critica discografica (1982)
- Premio Tenco per operatore culturale (1982)
- Grand Officer of the Republic (1995)
- Knight Grand Cross (2002)
