= Torna! =

- Directed by: Raffaello Matarazzo
- Written by: Aldo De Benedetti
- Starring: Amedeo Nazzari; Yvonne Sanson
- Cinematography: Tino Santoni
- Edited by: Mario Serandrei
- Music by: Michele Cozzoli
- Release date: 31 March 1954
- Language: Italian

Torna! (i.e. "Come Back!") is a 1953 Italian melodrama film that was directed by Raffaello Matarazzo and starring Amedeo Nazzari and Yvonne Sanson.

== Plot ==
Roberto, who has been estranged from his family, presumably because of his illegitimate birth, is called by his cousins Susanna and Giacomo to the reading of their uncle's final will and testament.

He learns that he, along with the other cousins, is to inherit a third of the estate but, hearing the harsh language used by his late uncle concerning his mother, abruptly refuses his share, and gets up to leave. Susanna stops him and requests that they be left alone.

She explains that their uncle actually loved Roberto and, as proof, shows him photos their uncle had kept out of obvious pride and fondness. Roberto is surprised by these sudden revelations.

The next day he meets with the Notary who informs him that the estate is nearly worthless, burdened with heavy mortgages and a defunct shipyard. When Susanna learns that she may have to leave the home in which her uncle had raised her, she becomes visibly upset. Roberto, meanwhile, has agreed to accept his share of the inheritance and, moved by Susanna's distress, resolves to revive the shipyard business with the prospect of keeping the house.

At that point, Giacomo, who confesses to having neither the courage nor the will to put in the required work, backs away from his inheritance and leaves for Montecarlo, where he hopes to strike it rich at the roulette table.

There he meets Viviana, an older, lonely woman, who helps him win a fortune. After several years, he returns to his hometown with Viviana in tow, with a secret plan to marry Susanna, to whom he had already proposed, who at one time, had been his lover, but who then refused his proposal.

He finds her in the shipyard office typing a business letter; she has since fallen in love with and married Roberto. Giacomo declares his undying love for Susanna and when she spurns his advances yet again, he vows to destroy her happiness. He calls her to his room, where he shows her a love letter which she had written to him years before, but the letter is undated and makes reference to "him" going to the shipyard, so that they can be alone together. The man in question is actually her late uncle, but could easily be understood to be her husband who likewise is working at the shipyard.

When Giacomo's threats of blackmail get him nowhere, he resorts to leaving the letter out for Viviana who he knows will divulge its contents to Roberto, thus to make him think that he and Susanna are still seeing each other behind his back.

Roberto then pretends to leave on a business trip, so that he can follow Susanna's movements in secret. Meanwhile, Giacomo, knowing that Roberto will be on Susanna's trail, goes to the family villa and has the gardener, Vittorio, call Susanna there under false pretenses. When Susanna arrives at the villa, Giacomo takes her forcibly into his arms just as Roberto walks into the room.

Roberto takes the scene at face value and orders Susanna to leave. He then questions Giacomo, who gleefully tells Roberto a pack of lies about himself and Susanna, with the added vengeful allegation that Lidia, their four-year-old daughter, is actually his own child.

Roberto, furious, rushes back to his home to have the little girl separated from her mother, taken to the home of an elderly couple, to be kept there in secret and away from her mother. Susanna arrives home shortly thereafter and becomes distraught at what amounts to the kidnap of her daughter.

In fact, the family attorney, stopping short of telling Roberto he has committed a crime, uses instead moral suasion to convince Roberto that he would not be returning a daughter to her mother, but a mother to her daughter, since the true victim is the innocent child.

He agrees to provide the attorney with the whereabouts of the child whom the mother can now retrieve. She and the attorney set out together by train and bus to the stated location, but torrential rains cause a landslide that brings them to a halt 20 kilometers short of their destination. They are forced to stop for the night at a nearby town.

Meanwhile, Giacomo, seeing his opportunity at last to blackmail Susanna into marrying him, now that Roberto has been convinced of her infidelity, decides abruptly to leave Viviana. Distraught, she finds a revolver in a desk drawer while Giacomo is momentarily out of the room. He returns, they struggle for the gun, and she accidentally shoots him in the stomach.

While this is going on, a landslide crushes the home in which the little girl Lidia was being kept by the elderly couple. The man is out helping clear the road, but the woman and little girl are buried beneath the rubble. The woman, unable to get out of the house, is presumably dead. But the little girl, thrown clear by the woman, is merely trapped under soft debris.

A mad woman, Luisa, whose old child had been killed in a landslide, hears the girl's cries for help, rescues her, and thinking she's her own daughter, whose name was Pinuccia, takes her to her hovel in the nearby forest. At this point, though, the little girl is presumed dead by everyone else. Susanna, receiving the news, storms into Roberto's office and accuses him of murder, since it was he who had put the girl into that situation.

But then, Giacomo, learning that he is about to die of his bullet wound, summons Roberto to his bedside to confess that he had been lying, that Susanna actually loves him, Roberto, and that Lidia was his, Roberto's, daughter.

Roberto, now knowing the truth, rushes out to the scene and orders a comprehensive search for the little girl who, he thinks, may still be alive. Just at that moment, Luisa comes along searching for food, and Roberto, against the advice of the old man, decides to follow her back to her hovel, where he finds his daughter safe and sound, but is stabbed by the delusional Luisa, who thinks the girl is Pinuccia, her own daughter.

Susanna soon hears the news that her daughter is still alive, and the family are reunited in a happy ending. When Roberto asks Susanna for forgiveness, she replies simply that the most important thing is that he's come back.

== Cast ==
- Amedeo Nazzari as Roberto Varesi
- Yvonne Sanson as Susanna
- Franco Fabrizi as Giacomo Marini
- Enrica Dyrell as Viviana
- Giovanna Scotto as Antonia
- Liliana Gerace as Luisa
- Maria Grazia Sandri as Lidia
- Teresa Franchini as Reverend Mother
- Olinto Cristina as Attorney
- Rita Livesi as Governess
- Giulio Tomasini as Vittorio
- Giorgio Capecchi as Lawyer Antonio Mezzara
- Nino Marchesini as Notary
