= Woman of the Red Sea =

1953 Italian comedy film by Giovanni Roccardi

- Directed by: Giovanni Roccardi
- Written by: Ferdinando Contestabile; Alessandro De Stefani; Giovanni Roccardi; Giuliano Tomei
- Produced by: Goffredo Lombardo
- Starring: Sofia Lazzaro; Steve Barclay; Umberto Melnati
- Cinematography: Angelo Jannarelli
- Edited by: Mario Serandrei
- Music by: Angelo Francesco Lavagnino
- Production companies: Phoenix Film; Titanus
- Release date: 20 March 1953
- Running time: 90 minutes
- Country: Italy
- Language: Italian

Woman of the Red Sea or Africa Under the Seas (Italian: Africa sotto i mari) is a 1953 Italian comedy film directed by Giovanni Roccardi and starring Sophia Loren, Steve Barclay and Umberto Melnati.

For the release of the film Loren, who had up to this point acted as Sofia Lazzaro, adopted her new screen name by which she became famous. This was partly in imitation of the then better-known Swedish actress Märta Torén. Loren learned to swim for the role, and spent much of her screen time in a bathing suit. This led one critic to worry that she was being turned into an Italian Esther Williams.

The film's sets were designed by Ottavio Scotti.

== Synopsis ==
The troublesome daughter of an American millionaire accompanies him aboard his yacht on a deep sea diving expedition in the Red Sea and falls in love with the captain.

== Cast ==
- Sophia Loren as Barbara Lama
- Steve Barclay as Paolo
- Umberto Melnati as Sebastiano Lama
- Alessandro Fersen as Prof. Krauss
- Antonio Cifariello as Pierluigi
- Antonio Bardi as Franco
- Masino Manunza as Masino
- Osman Omar as Ali
- Ibrahim Ahmed as Hussein
- Ahmed Ben Yusuf as Kassin

== Bibliography ==
- Marinella Carotenuto. Sophia Loren. The quintessence of being an italian woman.. Mediane, 2009.
- Lucy Fischer & Marcia Landy. Stars: The Film Reader. Psychology Press, 2004.
- Kerry Segrave & Linda Martin. The continental actress: European film stars of the postwar era--biographies, criticism, filmographies, bibliographies. McFarland, 1990.
