= Who Is Without Sin =

Who is Without Sin
- DVD cover
- Directed by: Raffaello Matarazzo
- Written by: Alphonse de Lamartine (novel); Aldo De Benedetti; Raffaello Matarazzo
- Produced by: Goffredo Lombardo; Raffaello Matarazzo
- Starring: Yvonne Sanson; Amedeo Nazzari; Françoise Rosay
- Cinematography: Rodolfo Lombardi
- Edited by: Mario Serandrei
- Music by: Salvatore Allegra
- Production companies: Labor Films; Titanus
- Distributed by: Titanus
- Release date: 18 December 1952
- Running time: 97 minutes
- Country: Italy
- Language: Italian

Who is Without Sin (Italian: Chi è senza peccato) is a 1952 Italian melodrama film by Raffaello Matarazzo and starring Yvonne Sanson, Amedeo Nazzari and Françoise Rosay. It is an adaptation of the novel Geneviève by Alphonse de Lamartine. It was part of a series of romantic melodramas that Nazzari and Sanson appeared in during the 1950s.

== Cast ==
- Yvonne Sanson as Maria Dermoz
- Amedeo Nazzari as Stefano Brunot
- Françoise Rosay as contessa Lamieri
- Enrica Dyrell as Laura Morresi
- Enrico Olivieri as Nino
- Anna Maria Sandri as Lisetta Dermoz
- Gianni Musy as Dario
- Gualtiero Tumiati as prete
- Teresa Franchini as Adele
- Liliana Gerace as Agnese
- Rita Livesi
- Giorgio Capecchi as Il console
- Giovanni Dolfini as Il direttore del carcere
- Michele Malaspina as L'avvocato dell' accusa
- Nino Marchesini as Il maresciallo
- Dina Perbellini as La madre superiora
- Amina Pirani Maggi as La sorvegliante del carcere

== Bibliography ==
- Moliterno, Gino. The A to Z of Italian Cinema. Scarecrow Press, 2009.
