= Goffredo Lombardo =

Italian film producer

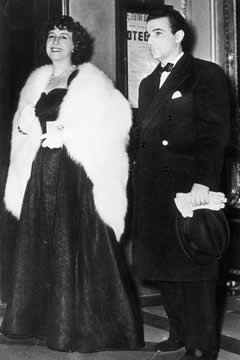
- Lombardo with his mother Leda Gys
- Born: 15 May 1920; Naples, Italy
- Died: 2 February 2005 (aged 84); Rome, Italy
- Occupation: Film producer
- Years active: 1949–2000

Goffredo Lombardo (15 May 1920 – 2 February 2005) was an Italian film producer. He was the son of the producer Gustavo Lombardo and took over control of the company Titanus after his father's death in 1951.

== Selected filmography ==
- Chains (1949)
- Torment (1950)
- Nobody's Children (1951)
- Who is Without Sin (1952)
- Woman of the Red Sea (1953)
- The White Angel (1955)
- The Naked Maja (1958)
- Maigret and the Saint-Fiacre Case (1959)
- The Angel Wore Red (1960)
- Rocco and His Brothers (1960)
- The Four Days of Naples (1962)
- Sodom and Gomorrah (1962)
- Mandrin (1962)
- Family Diary (1962)
- The Golden Arrow (1962)
- The Leopard (1963)
- The Fiances (1963)
