= Paolo e Francesca =

- Directed by: Raffaello Matarazzo
- Written by: Vittorio Calvino; Raffaello Matarazzo; Guglielmo Petroni
- Produced by: Giuseppe Bordoni
- Starring: Odile Versois; Armando Francioli
- Cinematography: Mario Montuori
- Edited by: Mario Serandrei
- Music by: Alessandro Cicognini
- Release date: 1950
- Language: Italian

Paolo e Francesca (Paolo and Francesca), also known as Legend of Love, is a 1950 Italian historical melodrama film directed by Raffaello Matarazzo and starring Odile Versois and Armando Francioli. It is loosely based on real life events of Paolo Malatesta and Francesca da Polenta.

== Plot ==
Italy, 13th century. Two families have just restored peace thanks to the marriage of Gianciotto Malatesta with the beautiful Francesca. Before the wedding, Malatesta sends his brother Paolo to his bride, who inevitably falls in love with Francesca. Theirs is a doomed love because it is immediately discovered by Malatesta, who kills the two lovers out of jealousy.

== Cast ==
- Odile Versois as Francesca
- Armando Francioli as Paolo Malatesta
- Andrea Checchi as Gianciotto Malatesta
- Aldo Silvani as The Astrologer
- Roberto Murolo as The Court Jester
- Sergio Fantoni
- Enzo Musumeci Greco as Captain Manfredo
- Nino Marchesini as Count Giulio Ilovello
- Angela Lavagna as The Mother Badessa
