= Emilio Cigoli =

Italian actor (1909–1980)

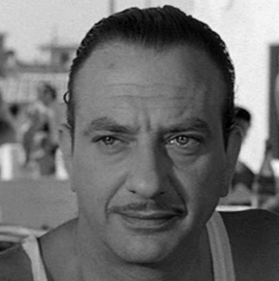
- Cigoli in Sunday in August (1950)
- Born: Emilio Cardi Cigoli; 18 November 1909; Livorno, Italy
- Died: 7 November 1980 (aged 70); Rome, Italy
- Occupations: Actor; voice actor; dubbing director
- Years active: 1935–1980
- Children: 2
- Mother: Giovanna Cigoli

Emilio Cigoli, born Emilio Cardi Cigoli (18 November 1909 – 7 November 1980) was an Italian actor and voice actor.

== Biography ==
Cigoli was born in Livorno to actress Giovanna Cigoli. His grandfather worked as a silent film actor. He began his career on stage at the age of 18 under the guidance of Alfredo De Sanctis and later did work for the EIAR. Cigoli appeared in more than 40 films and 20 television shows between 1935 and 1980, mostly in supporting roles. One of his major appearances was in the 1943 film The Children Are Watching Us as well as the 1950 film Sunday in August. Between 1943 and 1945, he worked in Spain with several colleagues to star in two Spanish-Italian films.

Cigoli found great success as a voice dubber, eventually doing voice work for over seven thousand films. He was the Italian voice of nearly every major Hollywood star from the 1940s through the 1960s, including Gregory Peck, John Wayne, Gary Cooper, Clark Gable, Henry Fonda, William Holden, Humphrey Bogart, Marlon Brando, Charlton Heston, Burt Lancaster, Steve Reeves, Vincent Price, Lee Van Cleef and Orson Welles. He also dubbed some Italian actors such as Andrea Checchi, Mino Doro, Alberto Farnese, Massimo Serato and Vittorio Gassman. Cigoli has dubbed the voice of the narrator in several documentaries, films and animated productions such as Sleeping Beauty, The Sword in the Stone and The Three Caballeros.

Cigoli married twice and had two children from his first marriage. He died in Rome on 7 November 1980 just 11 days before his 71st birthday.

== Partial filmography ==
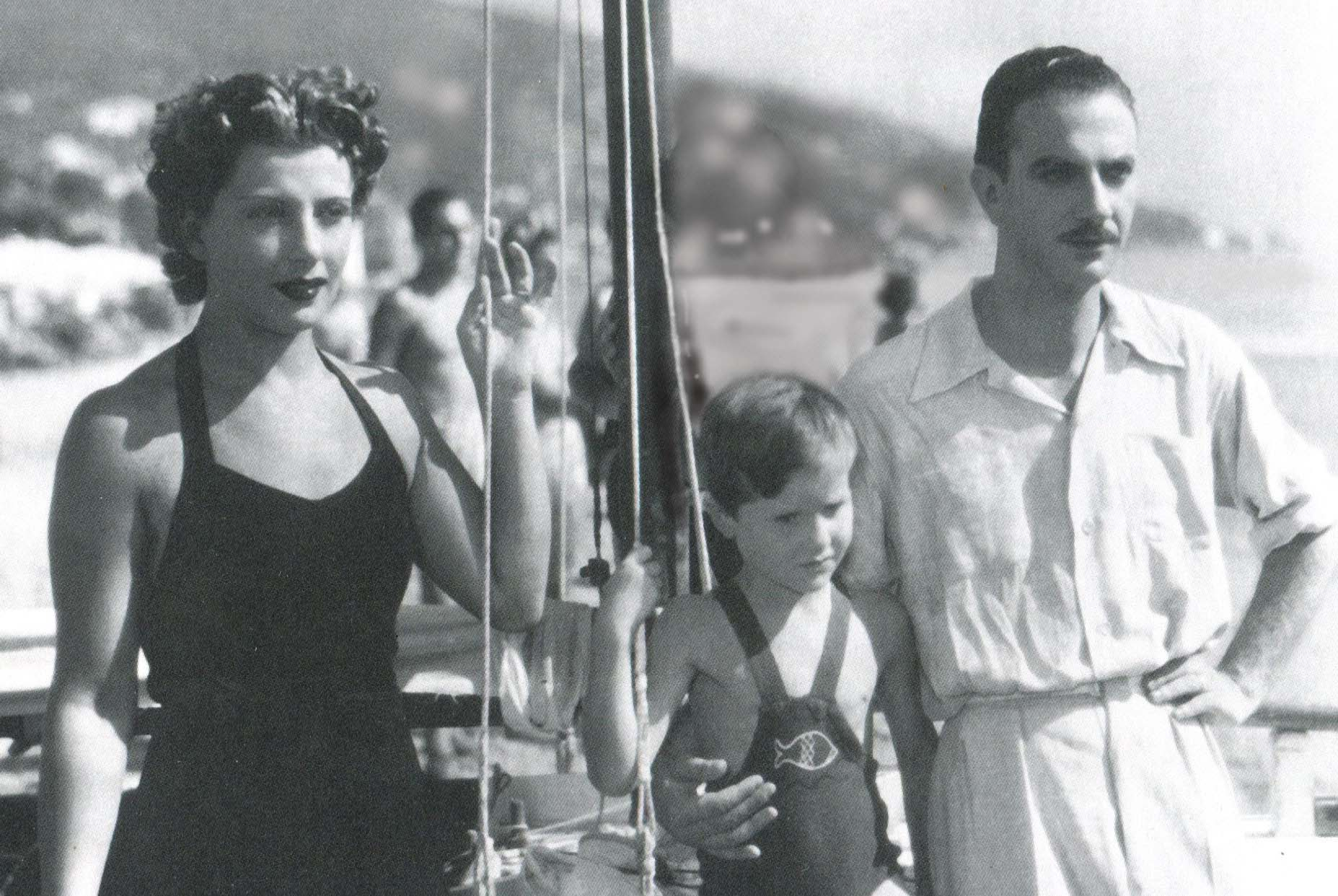
Cigoli (right) in The Children Are Watching Us (1943)

- I Love You Only (1936)
- Departure (1938) - L'impiegato dell'agenzia marittima
- La sposa dei re (1938) - Giuseppe Bonaparte
- L'eredità in Corsa (1939)
- Dora Nelson (1939) - Il finto tresoriere
- One Hundred Thousand Dollars (1940) - Oldham
- Beyond Love (1940) - Ippoliti
- L'imprevisto (1940) - Il giovane
- The Hero of Venice (1941) - Alvise Guoro
- Giarabub (1942) - Il maggiore John Williams
- Love Story (1942) - L'avvocato difensore
- We the Living (1942) - Pavel Sjerov
- The Gorgon (1942) - Miniato - lo scudiero
- La carica degli eroi (1943)
- Il matrimonio segreto (1943)
- Dora la espía (1943)
- The Children Are Watching Us (1943) - Andrea - il padre
- Fuga nella tempesta (1945) - Scienziato
- Shoeshine (1946) - Staffera
- The Lovers (1946)
- The Opium Den (1947) - De Rossi
- The Other (1947) - Commissario
- The Charterhouse of Parma (1948) - (uncredited)
- Sunday in August (1950) - Alberto Mantovani
- Rapture (1950)
- Little World of Don Camillo (1952) - Narrator (voice, uncredited)
- Article 519, Penal Code (1952) - Padre di Clara
- The Return of Don Camillo (1953) - Narrator (voice, uncredited)
- Verdi, the King of Melody (1953) - Gaetano Donizetti
- Of Life and Love (1954) - Narrator in the prologue (uncredited)
- Pietà per chi cade (1954) - Attorney Marsi
- Guai ai vinti (1954) - Pietro, marito di Teresa
- Human Torpedoes (1954) - Ammiraglio
- The White Angel (1955) - Il direttore della prigione
- Don Camillo's Last Round (1955) - Voce narrante (uncredited)
- Giuramento d'amore (1955) - L'editore Edoardo Rufino
- I giorni più belli (1956) - Uno degli ex alunni
- Noi siamo le colonne (1956) - Narrator (voice, uncredited)
- The Most Wonderful Moment (1957) - Morelli
- Melancholic Autumn (1958) - Medico in contatto radio (uncredited)
- Lettere di una novizia (1960) - Publico Ministero
- Erik the Conqueror (1961) - Narrator (voice, uncredited)
- Il solco di pesca (1975) - Uncle of Davide
