= The Naked Maja (film) =

1958 film directed by Henry Koster

- Theatrical Film Poster
- Directed by: Henry Koster
- Written by: Albert Lewin; Oscar Saul; Talbot Jennings
- Screenplay by: Norman Corwin; Giorgio Prosperi
- Produced by: Silvio Clementelli; Goffredo Lombardo
- Starring: Ava Gardner; Anthony Franciosa; Amedeo Nazzari; Gino Cervi; Lea Padovani
- Cinematography: Giuseppe Rotunno
- Edited by: Mario Serandrei
- Music by: Angelo Lavagnino
- Distributed by: United Artists; Metro-Goldwyn-Mayer
- Release dates: 20 December 1958 (Italy); 10 June 1959 (U.S.)
- Running time: 111 minutes
- Countries: United States; Italy
- Language: English
- Budget: $913,000
- Box office: $1 million (outside U.S./Canada)

The Naked Maja is a 1958 Italian-American historical film, a coproduction produced by S.G.C., Titanus, Metro-Goldwyn-Mayer and United Artists. The story recounts the romance between the painter Francisco Goya and the Duchess of Alba. The film was directed by Henry Koster and produced by Silvio Clementelli and Goffredo Lombardo. Its screenplay was written by Norman Corwin, Giorgio Prosperi and Albert Lewin based on a story by Oscar Saul and Talbot Jennings. The musical score was conducted by Angelo Lavagnino and the cinematographer was Giuseppe Rotunno.

The film stars Ava Gardner and Anthony Franciosa with Amedeo Nazzari, Gino Cervi, Lea Padovani, Massimo Serato and a largely Italian cast.

== Plot ==
In 18th century Madrid, during the Spanish Inquisition, Francisco de Goya meets Maria Teresa de Cayetana, Duchess of Alba inside an inn after he sketches an image of her. To win Maria's affection, Goya fights a rival and is slashed during a fight. As his wounds are treated, Maria acknowledges Goya's paintings and invites him to a concert at her home the next evening. She is then handed Goya's sketch and asks him to paint a portrait some day.

For several days, during a royal art commission, Goya paints frescoes on the Basilica's domed ceiling. As he finishes, Prime Minister Manuel Godoy escorts King Carlos IV, Queen Maria Luisa, and their court to inspect Goya's frescoes. Although Maria Luisa is insulted that Goya included peasants, Carlos is impressed and appoints Goya as the official court painter.

Inside the palace, Carlos instructs Goya to paint a portrait of the royal family. After several weeks pass, Maria attends an annual festival with peasants who demonstrate against Godoy's government despite the advice of her official advisor Rodrigo Sanchez and the Queen's wishes. Meanwhile, as Carlos observes Goya's progress, Delgado, the Minister of Justice, informs the king about Godoy's corruption. Unconcerned with Godoy, the King declines to act. Godoy, after learning of Delgado's disloyalty, has him removed from office. Goya, however pleads with Carlos to intervene and condemns the injustice. Carlos advises Goya to keep to his painting.

On his way to the inn, Maria greets Goya, who harshly criticizes her of hypocrisy. As the Royal Army confronts a gathering crowd, Goya takes Maria to an inn for safety. There, she and Goya dance and acknowledge their mutual attraction. In love with Maria, Goya decides to paint her portrait and takes Maria to his studio where they embrace each other.

When Maria returns home, she finds Godoy and his soldiers have intruded. Godoy explains she has been exiled for one year to a countryside villa as punishment. The next day, Goya's friend Juanito tells him that Maria has abruptly left. Enraged, Goya finds the exiled Maria in the villa and decides to stay with her while he continues to paint.

During her exile, Godoy visits Maria and asks her to rejoin the Royal Family in resisting Napoleon's invasion of Spain. He also demands Goya return to Madrid in three days, or face the inquisition, as Godoy has found evidence to use against him. To spare his life, Maria plays on Goya's jealousy and embraces Rodrigo Sanchez. Upset, Goya returns to Madrid and falls ill.

As Goya recovers, he makes satirizing sketches of Maria and Spanish society, which become known as "The Caprices." At his studio, Inquisition soldiers confiscate the Caprices for being morally offensive and arrest Goya. During his trial, Goya defends his paintings and refuses to identify Maria as the model for the nude portrait. As the tribunal prepares to declare him guilty, Goya is released due to a court petition signed by Godoy.

Spurred by Maria's rejection, Godoy orders her to be poisoned. Meanwhile, Carlos is summoned to France and later abdicates the throne, in which Napoleon installs his elder brother Joseph Bonaparte as king. As Maria falls ill, the Spanish people fight against the French occupation, and a mob attacks Godoy. Goya arrives at Maria's house, where she encourages him to continue painting for Spain. She also asks for her portrait, and, as he prepares to retrieve it, Maria collapses on the floor and dies. Goya screams in anguish.

== Cast ==
- Ava Gardner as Maria Teresa de Cayetana, Duchess of Alba
- Anthony Franciosa as Francisco Goya
- Amedeo Nazzari as Manuel Godoy
- Gino Cervi as King Carlos IV
- Lea Padovani as Queen Maria Luisa
- Massimo Serato as Rodrigo Sanchez
- Renzo Cesana as Bayeu
- Carlo Giustini as José
- Carlo Rizzo as Juanito

== Reception ==
According to MGM records, the film earned $1 million at the box office outside the U.S. and Canada, resulting in a loss to the studio of $513,000.

The film earned $450,000 in Italy.
