= Yvonne Sanson =

Italian actress

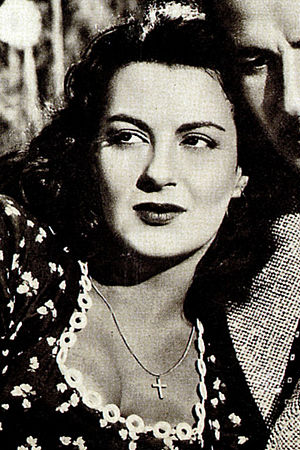
- Sanson in Nobody's Children (1951)
- Born: 29 August 1925; Thessaloniki, Greece
- Died: 23 July 2003 (aged 77); Bologna, Italy
- Occupation: Actress
- Years active: 1946–1972

Yvonne Sanson, born Fotini Sapountzakis (Greek: Φωτεινή Σαπουντζάκη 29 August 1925 – 23 July 2003), was a Greek, naturalized Italian, film actress. She appeared in 46 films between 1946 and 1972, mainly working in Italy.

Born in Thessaloniki, Sanson was the daughter of a Greek Army officer and an Asia Minor Greek mother. Various stories appeared in the press as to her origins, including being of French, Russian or Turkish descent, but they are mostly fictitious, except for the fact had a Russian grandparent.

== Partial filmography ==
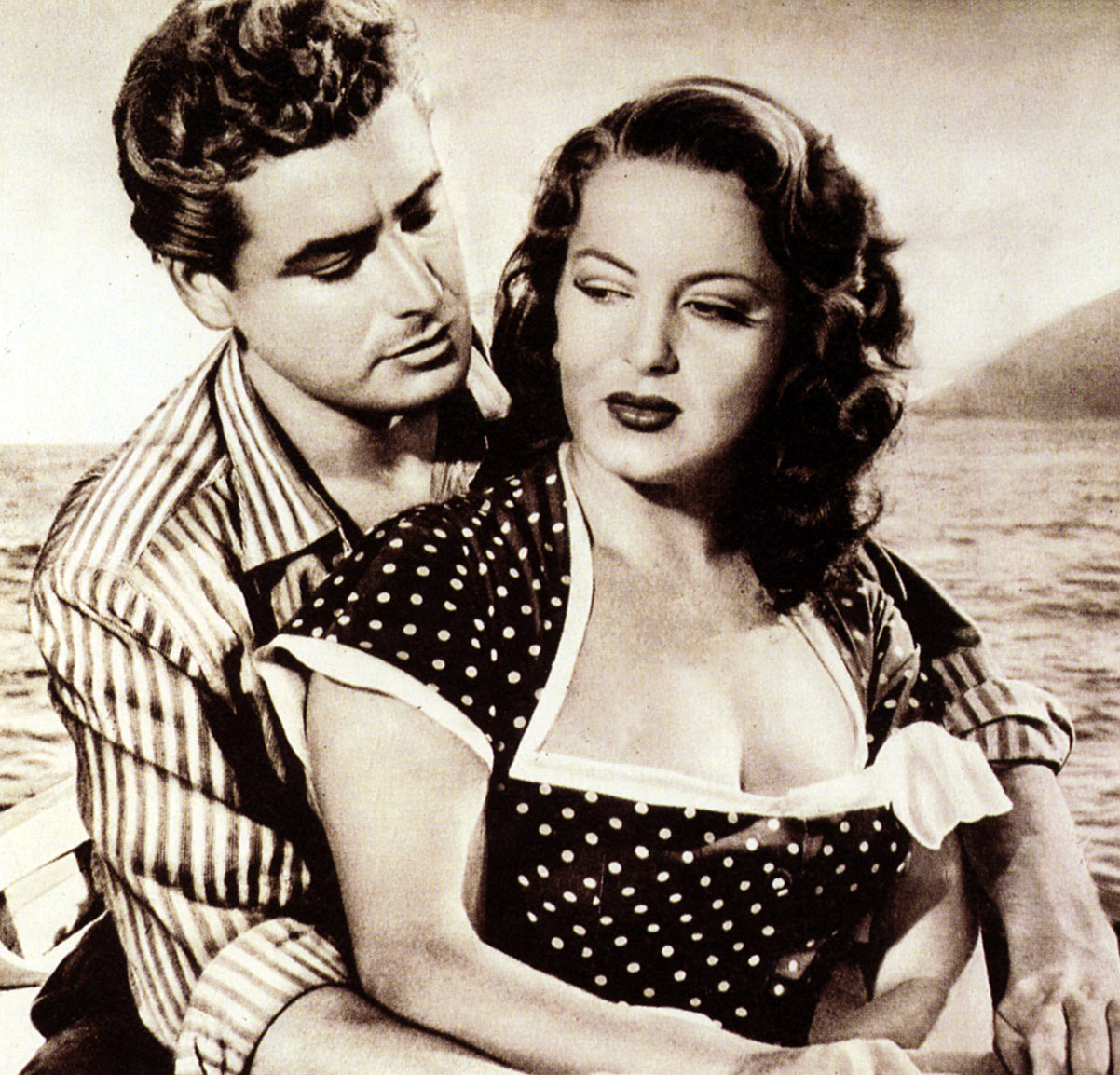
Yvonne Sanson and Alberto Farnese in Falsehood (1952)

- The Black Eagle (1946) - Una ragazza alla festa
- The Great Dawn (1947) - Daisy
- Flesh Will Surrender (1947) - Ginevra Canale
- The Mysterious Rider (1948) - L'imperatrice Caterina II di Russia
- Alarm Bells (1949) - Australia
- Chains (1949) - Rosa Carrisi
- The Emperor of Capri (1949) - Sonia Bulgarov
- Torment (1950) - Anna Ferrari
- Cintura di castità (1950)
- The Elusive Twelve (1950) - Herself
- Nobody's Children (1951) - Luisa Fanti / Sister Addolorata
- The Overcoat (1952) - Caterina
- Are We All Murderers? (1952) - Yvonne Le Guen (version italienne)
- The Shameless Sex (1952) - Wanda
- Falsehood (1952) - Luisa Sangro
- Who is Without Sin (1952) - Maria Dermoz
- Noi peccatori (1953) - Lucia
- When You Read This Letter (1953) - Irène Faugeret
- Nero and the Burning of Rome (1953) - Stabilia Messalina
- The Three Musketeers (1953) - Milady de Winter
- Star of India (1954) - Madame Montespan
- Torna! (1954) - Susanna
- Bread, Love and Jealousy (1954) - La nuova levatrice (uncredited)
- The White Angel (1955) - Sister Addolorata / Lina Mercolin
- La moglie è uguale per tutti (1955) - Yvonne Micucci
- The Miller's Beautiful Wife (1955) - Donna Dolores
- Escape to the Dolomites (1955) - Teresa
- Il campanile d'oro (1955) - Carmela
- This Angry Age (1957) - Carmen
- L'ultima violenza (1957) - Anna Carani
- Melancholic Autumn (1958) - María Martínez
- We Have Only One Life (1958) - Bibi
- World of Miracles (1959) - Sarah
- Rome 1585 (1961) - Donna Olimpia di Gonzales
- Black City (1961) - Mariannina
- Anima nera (1962) - Olga Manfredi
- Lo smemorato di Collegno (1962) - Linda Ballarini
- Django (1966) - Redhead Saloon Girl (uncredited)
- Day of Anger (1967) - Vivien Skill
- The Biggest Bundle of Them All (1968) - Teresa
- Mr. Kinky (1968) - Carla Bagni
- Il ragazzo che sorride (1969) - Mother of Livia
- Pensando a te (1969)
- Don Franco e Don Ciccio nell'anno della contestazione (1970) - Donna Camilla - madre di Anna
- The Conformist (1970) - Madre di Giulia
- Un apprezzato professionista di sicuro avvenire (1972) - Lucetta's mother
- A.A.A. Massaggiatrice bella presenza offresi... (1972) - Mother of Cristina
