= Torment (1950 Italian film) =

1950 Italian melodrama film directed by Raffaello Matarazzo

- Directed by: Raffaello Matarazzo
- Written by: Aldo De Benedetti; Libero Bovio; Gaspare Di Maio; Raffaello Matarazzo
- Produced by: Goffredo Lombardo; Raffaello Matarazzo
- Starring: Amedeo Nazzari; Yvonne Sanson; Annibale Betrone; Teresa Franchini
- Cinematography: Tino Santoni
- Edited by: Mario Serandrei
- Music by: Gino Campase
- Production companies: Titanus; Labor Film
- Distributed by: Titanus Distribuzione
- Release date: 11 February 1950
- Running time: 87 minutes
- Country: Italy
- Language: Italian

Torment (Italian: Tormento) is a 1950 Italian melodrama film directed by Raffaello Matarazzo and starring Amedeo Nazzari, Yvonne Sanson and Annibale Betrone. The film's sets were designed by Ottavio Scotti. It was part of a group of popular melodramas featuring Nazzari and Sanson that were released in the post-war years.

== Plot ==
Anna lives with her Father, Gaetano Ferrari, and her needlessly cruel step-mother Matilde.

As Anna's father and step-mother are out for the night to the theater, Anna receives a call from Carlo, her lover, saying he is in town from a business trip for only the night and that he wants to see her, and she joins him for a ride. The performance at the theater is cancelled, resulting in the father and step-mother returning early and finding the house empty. Matilde intentionally locks Anna out, forcing Carlo and Anna to ring at the door. To defend Anna from Matilde's accusations of impurity, Carlo proposes marriage, but Matilde continues to attack, forcing Anna to run away with Carlo.

Anna sends Gaetano a letter asking for forgiveness and informing him that Carlo still intends to marry her. Matilde intercepts the letter and keeps it from him.

Carlo says the wedding will require at least 300,000 lira, and goes to his business partner at a furniture producer to receive his pay in advance, but he is initially refused, being told that he had done nothing to deserve it. He gets into a violent argument with his partner, but they are interrupted. He finally agrees to 500,000 lira rather than a share of the company's income, and he continues to a jeweler to purchase the rings for the wedding.

After Carlo left the building, his business partner was killed, a crime which he gets put on trial for despite having the jeweler as a witness for his alibi.

While Carlo is waiting for his trial, Anna gets a job to support herself, discovers that she is pregnant, and gives birth to their baby that she names Ninuccia. Their wedding takes place in the jail Carlo is held in, observed by the other men awaiting trial, Carlo's lawyer, and the infant Ninuccia. Not until Ninuccia is at least a year old is Carlo judged guilty for the crime he didn't commit.

Anna tries to find work, but the stigma of having a husband in prison makes it difficult to find a job that is not hard labor. She finds a job as a cleaner.

Gaetano receives a telegram from the lawyer saying that Anna had tried to kill herself and is shocked to learn that she is married and has a child. He becomes furious that Matilde kept Anna's letters from him, and he suffers a heart attack in his elevated emotions. On his deathbed, he makes Matilde promise to look after Anna and Ninuccia, and then he makes her swear to do so, and then he makes her take down the crucifix from the wall and swear before God that she will look after Ninuccia.

Matilde makes the offer to Anna to look after Ninuccia if Anna promises to never see her again. Anna is outraged and refuses, determined to look after Ninuccia without her help.

Working in the kitchen at a restaurant, Anna is recognized by an old friend, Enzo, who wishes to become closer. He gives her a ride home, making his intentions clear, but she remains true to Carlo and refuses him. Enzo goes to his boss and secures a promotion for her, including an increase in pay that Enzo supplies with his own money. However, Enzo's boss tries to force himself on Anna, and she rejects him, slaps him, and refuses the increase in pay. Anna returns to find Ninuccia ill. The doctor says her health is diminishing, so Anna, desperate, goes to Matilde for help.

Matilde has the same terms: she will look after Ninuccia if Anna agrees never to see her again, now with the added cruelty of forcing Anna into a religious home for wayward women.

Both Anna and Ninuccia are miserable without each other. Ninuccia is kept in Matilde's home and is looked after by Rosina, Matilde's maid. Matilde frightens Ninuccia and locks her in dark rooms when she misbehaves, but Rosina is kind and cares for her.

In the home for wayward women, Anna refuses to repent for her sins, saying she did nothing wrong which is the truth, but no one believes her. Anna compares the home to a prison and claims that she could escape if she wanted.

Ninuccia wishes to see Anna, and Enzo manages to arrange a night for the two of them to meet. The Mother of the home, Madre Celeste, catches Anna trying to sneak out to see Ninuccia, and Anna accuses her of knowing nothing of what it is like to be a mother. Celeste then reveals that she had a child who died in childhood, and, moved by emotion, tells Anna to go and see her child.

However, Anna is ill and passes out before she reaches the car where Enzo, Rosina, and Ninuccia wait for her. She is brought back to the home by a pair of men who find her.

At Matilde's house, Carlo reveals that he was released after 5 years since the true killer had been found and convicted. He demands the Matilde tell him where Anna and Ninuccia are. Matilde tells him nothing but that Anna is an evil women in a home for wayward women, but Rosina reveals everything, calling Matilde a liar and saying that Anna is a saint. Rosina sends Carlo and Ninuccia off to see Anna.

Anna wakes with Celeste in the room, still feeling ill, and says that she is losing faith that she will see Ninuccia again. Madre Celeste tells her that she must keep her faith. Anna says that she can hear Ninuccia approaching, appearing to Celeste to be imagining things. But Ninuccia and Carlo come through the door. Anna thinks it is a dream, but Carlo assures her that it is real, and the three embrace.

== Cast ==
- Amedeo Nazzari as Carlo Guarnieri
- Yvonne Sanson as Anna Ferrari
- Annibale Betrone as Gaetano Ferrari
- Mario Ferrari as L'avvocato Bianchi
- Teresa Franchini as Rosina
- Tina Lattanzi as Matilde Ferrari
- Aldo Nicodemi as Ruffini
- Giuditta Rissone as Madre Celeste
- Vittorio Sanipoli as Rossi, un socio di Carlo
- Roberto Murolo as Enzo Sandri
- Rosalia Randazzo as Ninuccia
- Rita Livesi
