= Chains (film) =

- Directed by: Raffaello Matarazzo
- Written by: Libero Bovio; Gaspare Di Maio; Nicola Manzari; Aldo De Benedetti
- Produced by: Goffredo Lombardo; Raffaello Matarazzo
- Starring: Amedeo Nazzari; Yvonne Sanson
- Cinematography: Carlo Montuori
- Edited by: Mario Serandrei
- Music by: Gino Campese
- Production companies: Labor Film; Titanus
- Distributed by: Titanus Distribuzione
- Release date: 29 October 1949
- Running time: 90 min
- Country: Italy
- Language: Italian

Catene (internationally released as Chains) is a 1949 Italian melodrama film directed by Raffaello Matarazzo. It had an impressive commercial success, being seen by 6 million people, one in eight Italians of the time, and was followed by a series of six other successful films directed by Matarazzo and featuring the couple Amedeo Nazzari and Yvonne Sanson. The film was remade in 1974.

The film's sets were designed by the art director Ottavio Scotti. The film was featured in Cinema Paradiso (1988). In 2008, the film was included on the Italian Ministry of Cultural Heritage's 100 Italian films to be saved, a list of 100 films that "have changed the collective memory of the country between 1942 and 1978." Maligned by critics because it did not conform to precepts of neorealism, this did not prevent its unexpected box office success.

== Plot ==
Emilio drives away in a stolen vehicle until it breaks down. He has it brought to Guglielmo, a mechanic, who needs to replace the ignition coil. While Guglielmo replaces the coil, Emilio recognizes Rosa, his ex-fiancé. Emilio explains after he left her, he traveled to the United States and then returned to Europe before World War II. After Emilio leaves, Guglielmo reads in the newspaper the vehicle had been stolen in Posillipo. He goes to the police headquarters to report the robbery, where he identifies a man resembling Emilio. However, the real Emilio is not arrested and meets with Rosa after she drops her son Tonino at school. Rosa condemns Emilio for his robbery and asks to be left alone.

At a pyrotechnics festival, Emilio encounters Rosa again, convinced that fate has led him to her. The next morning, Guglielmo invites Emilio for coffee to discuss plans to expand his mechanic shop. Rosa disagrees, and Emilio leaves. Shortly after, Rosa confronts Emilio at his residential hotel and threatens to reveal their relationship to her husband. Regardless, Emilio expresses he is still in love with her. Rosa pleads again to be left alone, and returns home frustrated. Perplexed by his wife's behavior, Guglielmo follows his mother's advice and takes Rosa to Naples for her birthday. Suddenly, Emilio arrives and sits near her at a table. As Rosa and Emilio reminiscence their past romance, Tonino becomes troubled when he sees Emilio tightly holding his mother's hand.

Back at home, Tonino disrespects his mother, in which Guglielmo questions his son's behavior. The next morning, Rosa is handed a blackmail letter from Emilio, in which he threatens to reveal their relationship to Guglielmo if she does not choose him. As Rosa prepares to leave, Tonino tries to block his mother, but she shoves him aside. Angela, Rosa and Guglielmo's youngest daughter, alerts her father about Tonino's fight with Rosa and informs him about the letter. Guglielmo finds the letter in their cabinet and rushes to find his wife.

Rosa arrives at Emilio's hotel suite and pulls a handgun, but refuses to shoot him. Emilio forces himself on Rosa until Guglielmo arrives. He locks Rosa outside the door and shoots Emilio. Guglielmo sails for America, and Rosa leaves her children to Guglielmo's mother Anna. By Christmastime, Rosa has grown desperate for her children and is allowed to see Angela in her bedroom. Meanwhile, Guglielmo has grown homesick and is arrested by authorities to be sent back to Italy to stand trial.

At an attorney's office, Rosa learns Guglielmo faces thirty years in prison for premeditated murder, but affirms she is innocent of adultery. She hands the attorney the blackmail letter, to which Guglielmo's killing can be considered a crime of passion if Rosa confesses to adultery. The trial proceeds and Guglielmo is found not guilty, having acted in self-defense. With her reputation damaged, Rosa considers suicide but Guglielmo prevents her. He has learned from the attorney that Rosa has always been faithful. The two reunite with their children.

== Cast ==
- Amedeo Nazzari: Guglielmo Aniello
- Yvonne Sanson: Rosa Carresi
- Aldo Nicodemi: Emilio Marchi
- Teresa Franchini: Anna Aniello, mother of Guglielmo
- Aldo Silvani: prosecutor
- Roberto Murolo: emigrant
- Gianfranco Magalotti as Tonino Aniello
- Rosalia Randazzo as Angela Aniello
- Nino Marchesini as L'avvocato difensore
- Lilly Marchi
- Amalia Pellegrini
- Giulio Tomasini
