= Sodom and Gomorrah (1962 film) =

1962 epic biblical film by Robert Aldrich, Sergio Leone

- US theatrical release poster
- Directed by: Robert Aldrich
- Written by: Hugo Butler; Giorgio Prosperi
- Produced by: Goffredo Lombardo
- Starring: Stewart Granger; Pier Angeli; Stanley Baker; Rossana Podestà; Rik Battaglia; Giacomo Rossi-Stuart; Anouk Aimée
- Cinematography: Alfio Contini; Silvano Ippoliti; Cyril J. Knowles; Mario Montuori
- Edited by: Mario Serandrei; Peter Tanner
- Music by: Miklós Rózsa
- Production companies: Société Nouvelle Pathé Cinéma; Société Générale de Cinématographie; Titanus
- Distributed by: Consortium Pathé (France); Titanus (Italy); 20th Century Fox (United States)
- Release dates: 4 October 1962 (Italy); 21 November 1962 (France); 23 January 1963 (United States)
- Running time: 154 minutes
- Countries: France; Italy; United States
- Language: English
- Budget: $4.5 million
- Box office: $2.5 million (US/Canada rentals); 1,614,441 admissions (France)

Sodom and Gomorrah (also known as The Last Days of Sodom and Gomorrah in the United States) is a 1962 epic biblical film directed by Robert Aldrich from a screenplay by Hugo Butler and Giorgio Prosperi, loosely based on the Biblical reading of Sodom and Gomorrah. An international co-production between France, Italy and the United States, the film stars Stewart Granger, Pier Angeli, Stanley Baker, Rossana Podestà, Rik Battaglia, Giacomo Rossi-Stuart and Anouk Aimée.

== Plot ==
The twin cities of Sodom and Gomorrah prosper because of their great deposits of salt, which are mined by an army of slaves. The decadent citizens, who have become wealthy by trading salt, live in luxury and use slaves as servants and for violent games of entertainment.

After a night of revelry, Astaroth, the Prince of Sodom, tells slave girl Tamar to carry a message to the king of the Elamites, with whom he plans to overthrow his sister, Bera, Queen of Sodom. Returning from her meeting in the desert with the Elamite leader, Tamar is captured by a Sodomite patrol. Queen Bera demands the name of her co-conspirator. Tamar refuses to speak under interrogation and Bera has her and her two young sisters killed.

Meanwhile, Lot leads his family and a Hebrew tribe through the desert, hoping that he can find a permanent home for his people along the fertile banks of the River Jordan. By contrast with the people of the twin cities, the Hebrews are presented as a pious and austere people with high moral standards. As the Hebrews approach their destination, Lot meets the beautiful Ildith, who luxuriates in a litter while a group of slave girls in chains precede her over the rocky terrain. Lot assumes that Ildith owns these women. She tells him that she is also a slave, albeit the chief of the Queen of Sodom's body slaves. Lot tells her that owning slaves is evil.

Once Lot and his people reach the Jordan, he negotiates the use of the land on one side of the river with Queen Bera, promising her both grain and defense should Sodom's desert enemies attack. In a surprising turn, she gives Lot Ildith, who does not wish to leave the queen or her life of luxury in Sodom. Astorath is disgusted and baffled by his sister's easy terms with the Hebrews. However, he soon turns his attentions to Lot's flirtatious daughter, Shuah.

Ildith dislikes the rough conditions of the Hebrew camp, but soon befriends Lot's daughters. She and Lot also fall in love and plan to marry. Meanwhile, Shuah and Astaroth begin a secret affair. Lot's other daughter, Maleb and his headstrong lieutenant, Ishmael also plan a marriage.

Lot and Ildith's wedding day celebrations are interrupted by an Elamite attack. Although the Hebrew farmers and the Sodomite soldiers fight valiantly, they are nearly defeated by the fierce nomadic warriors. In a last, desperate measure, Lot orders that the dam that the Hebrews have built be broken. His quick thinking saves the twin cities and the Hebrews, but the camp and the crops are destroyed. However, the flood waters reveal that the Hebrew camp is also the site of a vast salt deposit. Lot now believes that the Hebrews can move out of the wilderness and live among the Sodomites ("separate, but in their full view", he cautions) by selling salt.

Some time later, Lot and Ildith now live in luxury in Sodom. Sodomites and Hebrews both revere Lot and seek his judgment. Ishmael however, believes that Lot has succumbed to luxury and instead should liberate Sodom's mine slaves. Lot disagrees and advises Ishmael to wait, believing that the Sodomites will change their ways in time. Ishmael does not heed Lot and unsuccessfully tries to set the slaves free, believing that the Hebrews will harbour them. Instead the Hebrews shut their doors on the desperate escapees who are soon recaptured and sentenced to death. As the newly appointed minister of justice, Lot must now sentence Ishmael. However Ishmael is only one of Lot's problems, as he is confronted by the jealous Astaroth, who tells him that not only has he slept with both of Lot's daughters, but that Ildith had known and kept the affairs secret. An outraged Lot kills Astaroth.

At this point, Queen Bera's plot becomes clear: she used the Hebrews to destroy the Elamite threat and also used Lot to rid her of her scheming brother. Lot becomes deeply remorseful that he has not only killed but he led his family and people into sin. Bera has him taken to prison.

While Lot asks God for forgiveness and guidance, two angels appear to tell him that God is displeased with the twin cities and will destroy them. Lot pleads with the angels to spare the city if he can find just ten Sodomite citizens who will repent and leave the cities with him. The angels agree and free both Lot and Ishmael from prison after warning Lot that anyone leaving Sodom who looks back will be struck down as well.

Meanwhile, many recaptured slaves are tortured to death on the wheel. Queen Bera exclaims "But wait, the entertainment has just begun", as Lot appears seeking ten righteous Sodomites. Although he has God's consent, Lot finds it impossible to persuade any Sodomite citizens to follow him; only the slaves are willing to accompany him. Even his own daughters, who believe Lot a hypocrite, at first refuse. Ildith, however, convinces them to leave, hoping that they will someday understand their father and his greatness as a leader. Shuah goes only grudgingly, telling Lot that she hopes to see him suffering, as she does now that Astaroth is dead.

Immediately after the Hebrews and Sodomite slaves leave, God assails Sodom with earthquakes and lightning. Queen Bera retreats with her slave Orphea to her palace, where they are killed under the collapsing pillars. The Sodomites flee into the streets, still committing vile and selfish acts to save themselves or exploit the chaos, and are killed by collapsing buildings and fire.

Meanwhile, Ildith now wishes she were back in Sodom. Despite her love for Lot, she cannot accept his God, choosing to believe in Lot rather than in a divine plan. Despite Lot's warnings, Ildith looks back at Sodom. God turns her into a pillar of salt and destroys the city with a final fiery explosion. Lot collapses in grief. Maleb and Shuah attempt to comfort Lot. Distraught, he staggers off with the Hebrews, who wander the desert once more.

== Cast ==
- Stewart Granger as Lot
- Anouk Aimée as Queen Bera
- Pier Angeli as Ildith, Lot's wife
- Stanley Baker as Prince Astaroth
- Rossana Podestà as Shuah
- Rik Battaglia as Melchior
- Giacomo Rossi-Stuart as Ishmael
- Scilla Gabel as Tamar
- Anthony Steffen as the captain (as Antonio de Teffi)
- Gabriele Tinti as lieutenant
- Enzo Fiermonte as Eber
- Daniele Vargas as Segur
- Claudia Mori as Maleb
- Feodor Chaliapin Jr. as Alabias
- Mitsuko Takara as Orphea
- Massimo Pietrobon as Isaac
- Mimmo Palmara as Arlok
- Liana Del Balzo as rich Hebrew woman
- Francesco Tensi as 1st old man
- Andrea Tagliabue as Eber's son
- Alice Kessler as dancer
- Ellen Kessler as dancer

== Production ==
Henry Koster was originally announced as director and Stephen Boyd as star. In August 1960, Titanus announced it would make the film with Joseph E. Levine and it would star Stewart Granger. In the fall, Robert Aldrich became attached as director.

Joseph E. Levine was enticed into a co-production with the Italian company Titanus. Levine:

All I saw was a bad script. They wanted a million dollars. I said "let's get a good script and spend two million. I'll put up 60% of two million." The cost went up to $6 million. But not out of my pocket. I pay only 60% of two million.

Filming started 11 January 1961.

Sergio Leone was hired to shoot some second unit photography but he left during the shoot – either quitting or being fired. Location shooting took place near Marrakesh and the budget grew from $2 million to $5 million.

Stanley Baker and Joseph E. Levine got along so well during filming that Levine agreed to finance Zulu.

== Post-production ==
=== Editing ===
In the original roadshow prints, there was an intermission halfway through the film.

=== Score ===
The film is notable for featuring the last of Miklós Rózsa's epic film scores. Rozsa, who replaced Dimitri Tiomkin, thought the film was tacky and inferior. In January, 2007, Digitmovies AE released a nearly complete version of the score on a two-CD set, which is taken from the Legend LP recording. Previously, other selections from the score were available on two CDs: one from Cambria Records and Publishing, which is taken from the composer's mono recordings and one from BMG, which is taken from the original LP.

=== Titles ===
Maurice Binder designed the title sequence that featured an orgy. He took three days to direct the sequence that was supposed to take one day.

== Reception ==
=== Box office ===
The film earned $2.5 million in ticket sales in the U.S. and Canada. It was one of two highest-grossing Italian films in Italy for the year ended 30 June 1963 along with Il Sorpasso. It was also one of the 12 most popular films at the British box office in 1963.

=== Critical response ===
On its release, critical reception of the film was almost universally negative. Bosley Crowther of The New York Times wrote "It is an obvious but feeble imitation of The Ten Commandments of Cecil B. de Mille, and it is much more concerned with salt-mining than it is with debauchery or lust." Modern critics have viewed the film just as negatively; a 2008 review in Time Out review states that the film was a "low point" in Aldrich's career and that the film represented "a 1960s tackiness thankfully not seen anymore". In an interview published after his death in 1983, Aldrich defended it, saying "I think we did a goddam respectable job with" the film. "I don't think you could do any more with that. If you had a guy you believed was Lot I think the picture would have worked. Also, half an hour was cut out. Everybody should do a biblical picture – once."
