= Melancholic Autumn =

- Yvonne Sanson and Amedeo Nazzari
- Directed by: Raffaello Matarazzo
- Written by: Ricardo Dominguez; Fernando Merelo; Ricardo Toledo; Aldo De Benedetti; Raffaello Matarazzo
- Produced by: Benito Perojo
- Starring: Amedeo Nazzari; Yvonne Sanson; Mercedes Monterrey
- Cinematography: Alejandro Ulloa
- Edited by: Antonio Ramírez de Loaysa; Mario Serandrei
- Music by: Juan Quintero Muñoz; Furio Rendine
- Production companies: Titanus; Producciones Benito Perojo; Compagnia Cinematografica
- Distributed by: Titanus Distribuzione; C.E.A. Distribución (Spain)
- Release dates: 7 August 1958 (Italy); 2 March 1959 (Spain)
- Running time: 71 minutes
- Countries: Italy; Spain
- Language: Italian

Melancholic Autumn (Italian: Malinconico autunno) is a 1958 Italian-Spanish melodrama film directed by Raffaello Matarazzo and starring Amedeo Nazzari, Yvonne Sanson and Mercedes Monterrey. It was part of a popular series of romantic dramas pairing Nazzari and Sanson. The film's sets were designed by the art director Sigfrido Burmann.

== Cast ==
- Amedeo Nazzari as Andrea, capitano del mercantile
- Yvonne Sanson as María Martínez
- Mercedes Monterrey as Lola
- José Guardiola as Giacomo
- Miguel Gil as Luca Martínez
- Manuel Guitián
- Vicente Soler
- Miguel Ángel Rodríguez as Il direttore della scuola di Luca
- Javier Dasti
- Ángel Calero
- Mariano Alcón
- María de las Rivas as Olga
- Stanislaw Domolaski
- Joaquín Vidriales
- María Alcarria
- Alfredo Broow
- Eugenio Chemelal
- Aurora de Alba
- Alfonso Godá
- Mario Umberto Martinelli
- Antonio Martín
- Mario Moreno

== Bibliography ==
- Moliterno, Gino. The A to Z of Italian Cinema. Scarecrow Press, 2009.
