= Nino Marchesini =

Italian actor

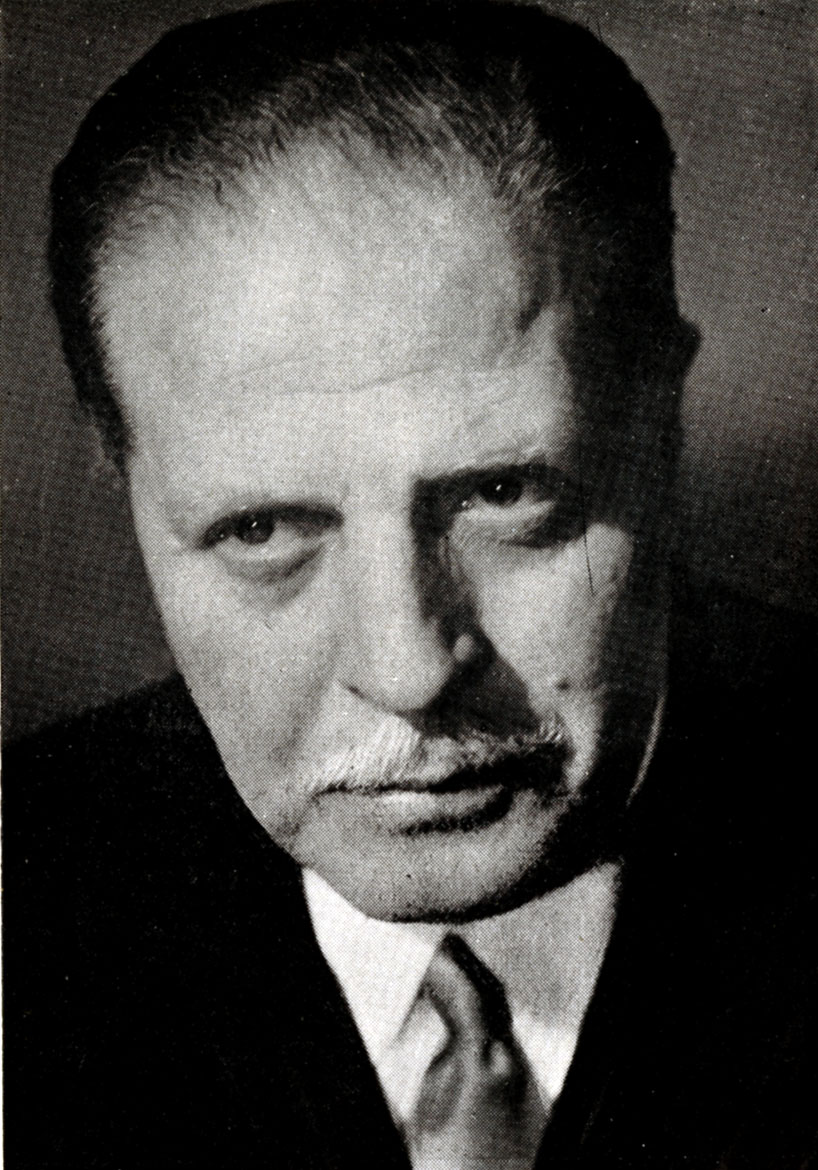
- Born: 1895; Lecce, Italy
- Died: 13 January 1961 (aged 65–66); Rome, Italy
- Occupation: Actor
- Years active: 1931-1961

Nino Marchesini (1895 – 13 January 1961) was an Italian actor. He appeared in more than seventy films from 1931 to 1961.

== Filmography ==
Year	Title	Role	Notes
1931	La stella del cinema	Direttore di produzione	
1937	The Ferocious Saladin	Fani	
1939	We Were Seven Widows	Un ufficiale di bordo	
1939	L'amore si fa così	Il direttore della Banca	
1939	Lo vedi come sei... lo vedi come sei?	Il banditore d'asta	Uncredited
1939	The Boarders at Saint-Cyr	Aubry	
1940	Arditi civili		
1940	Antonio Meucci	Il presidente del tribunale	
1940	The Siege of the Alcazar	Un ufficiale	Uncredited
1940	Abandonment	Il medico	
1940	Love Me, Alfredo!		
1940	Non me lo dire!	Un cliente del negozio	
1940	The Daughter of the Green Pirate	Il capitano dell'Esperanza	
1941	L'ultimo combattimento		
1941	Beatrice Cenci	Il castellano dei Colonna	
1941	Amore imperiale		
1942	Paura d'amare	Il conte Mariani	
1942	Invisible Chains	Un membro del consiglio d'amministrazione	
1942	A che servono questi quattrini?	Mattia, il maggiordomo del marchese	
1942	M.A.S.	Il comandante Ascerti	
1942	Fedora	Il secondo servo di casa Yariskine	
1942	La signorina		
1942	The Countess of Castiglione	Connot	
1942	I due Foscari	Il pubblico ministero	
1942	Colpi di timone	Enrico Negri	
1942	Malombra	L'ingeniere Perrier	Uncredited
1942	The Woman of Sin		
1943	Dagli Appennini alle Ande	Il comandante della nave	
1943	The White Angel	Il rettore del collegio	
1943	Enrico IV	Un amico di Belcredi	
1944	La fornarina: Vida e Amores de Rafael	Il governatore di Roma	
1945	The Ten Commandments		
1947	La revanche de Baccarat		
1947	La mascotte dei diavoli blu		
1947	Rocambole		
1948	Lohengrin		
1948	Baron Carlo Mazza	Il nuovo rico	
1949	Chains	L'avvocato dell'accusa	Uncredited
1950	Paolo e Francesca	Count Guido	
1950	Toto Looks for a Wife	Il signor Marco	
1950	La figlia del mendicante		
1950	Figaro Here, Figaro There	Mario	
1950	Bluebeard's Six Wives	Ispettore	
1950	Lo Zappatore	Padre Di Carlo	
1951	Nobody's Children	Il medico	
1952	Who Is Without Sin	Il maresciallo	Uncredited
1952	Redenzione		
1953	Noi peccatori	Il direttore dell'ospedale	
1953	Vortice		
1953	Siamo ricchi e poveri		
1953	Finalmente libero!		
1954	Torna!	Il notaio	
1954	Concert of Intrigue	Il colonello medico	
1954	The Pilgrim of Love	Presidente MFU	
1954	Il barcaiolo di Amalfi		
1954	Trieste cantico d'amore	conte Claudio	
1954	Peppino e la vecchia signora		
1954	La campana di San Giusto		
1954	I cinque dell'Adamello		
1955	The Miller's Beautiful Wife	Il barone	
1955	Cantami buongiorno tristezza	Commendator Salviati	
1956	Storia di una minorenne		
1956	I miliardari	Ruggero Lovatelli	
1956	Ciao, pais...		
1957	Io, Caterina	Gregorio XI	
1959	Conspiracy of the Borgias		
1959	Il cavaliere senza terra		
1959	The Black Archer	Ser Alvise	
1962	Hawk of the Caribbean	Viceking of Santa Cruz	(final film role)
