= The Miller's Beautiful Wife =

1955 film

The Miller's Beautiful Wife (La bella mugnaia)
- Film poster
- Directed by: Mario Camerini
- Written by: Augusto Camerini; Mario Camerini; Sandro Continenza; Ennio De Concini; Ivo Perilli
- Produced by: Dino De Laurentiis; Carlo Ponti
- Starring: Vittorio De Sica; Sophia Loren
- Cinematography: Enzo Serafin
- Edited by: Gisa Radicchi Levi
- Release date: 27 October 1955
- Running time: 95 minutes
- Country: Italy
- Language: Italian

The Miller's Beautiful Wife (Italian: La bella mugnaia) is a 1955 Italian comedy film directed by Mario Camerini, that stars Marcello Mastroianni, Sophia Loren and Vittorio De Sica. A remake of the director's 1934 film, 'Il capello a tre punte”, it is based on the Spanish novel El sombrero de tres picos that came out in 1874.

== Plot ==
In the south of Italy under Spanish rule, the young miller Luca lives with his wife Carmela. A good-looking and sociable couple, they host lunches at their mill for local dignitaries, including the Spanish governor Don Teofilo. When the governor makes advances to Carmela, she asks him for favours in return.

His inept administration of the province leads to an outbreak of popular anger at the annual celebration of the town's patron saint and among the many arrested and detained is Luca. Donna Dolores, the governor's neglected wife, realises that he has gone too far in his handling of the inhabitants and begs him to release them all, which he does apart from Luca.

At nightfall he goes out to the mill, planning to catch Carmela alone, but in the dark falls into the chilly millstream. Rescued by Carmela, he is put to bed with a hot toddy while his clothes dry by the fire. Meanwhile, Luca has escaped and, creeping into the darkened mill, sees not only Don Teofilo's clothes, but also the governor in the marital bed.

A way of getting even comes to him. Dressing in the governor's clothes, he goes to Don Teofilo's house and finds Donna Dolores in her bed. She responds eagerly to his advances, but he breaks off and reveals his identity, saying he has had his revenge. When Don Teofilo creeps back in the miller's nightshirt, Luca is able to humiliate him in front of his wife. She advises her contrite husband not only to avoid other men's wives but also to treat the inhabitants more justly.

Don Teofilo never discovers if his wife did succumb to Luca, who now spends more time with Carmela and less in socialising.

== Cast ==
- Vittorio De Sica as Don Teofilo
- Sophia Loren as Carmela
- Marcello Mastroianni as Luca
- Paolo Stoppa as Gardunia
- Yvonne Sanson as Donna Dolores
- Mario Passante
- Carlo Sposito (as Carletto Sposito)
- Virgilio Riento as Salvatore
- Elsa Vazzoler
- Angela Lavagna
- Amalia Pellegrini
- Silvio Bagolini
- Emilio Petacci
- Michele Riccardini
- Pietro Tordi
- Nino Marchesini
