= Gualtiero Tumiati =

Italian actor and stage director

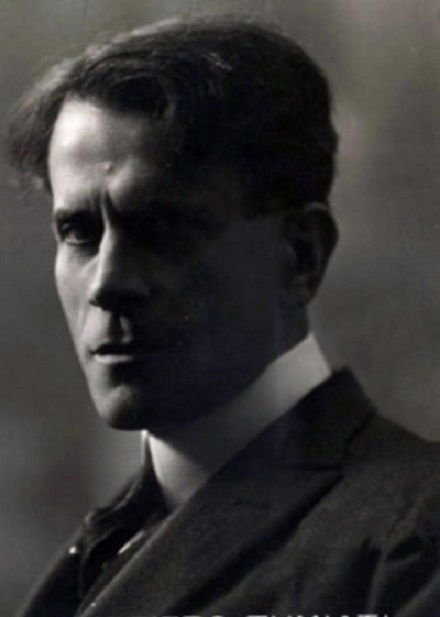
- Born: 8 May 1876; Ferrara, Italy
- Died: 23 April 1971 (aged 94); Rome, Italy
- Occupation: Actor

Gualtiero Tumiati ( 8 May 1876 – 23 April 1971) was an Italian actor and stage director.

== Life and career ==
Born in Ferrara, Tumiati studied at the College of the Oaks in Florence and there he attended the acting courses held by Luigi Rasi. He later graduated in law and while working as an apprentice lawyer at his father's law firm he started performing in some local stage companies. Tumiati's breakout role was Cyrano de Bergerac in a critically acclaimed representation of the Edmond Rostand's eponymous play held in 1910. With his wife, the actress and painter Beryl Hight, in 1928 Tumiati founded the "Sala Azzurra" ("Blue Room"), one of the first Avant-garde theaters in Italy. He taught acting at the Accademia d'Arte Drammatica in Rome and at the Accademia dei filodrammatici in Milan. Gone blind, his last role was in the blind Tiresias in a representation of Sophocles' Oedipus Rex held in 1969 in the La Scala theatre.

== Filmography ==
Year	Title	Role	Notes
1935	Casta Diva	Nicolò Paganini	
1942	Malombra	Il conte Cesare d'Ormengo	
1942	Piazza San Sepolcro		
1943	Life Is Beautiful	Il professore Luca Lecedius	
1945	Vivere ancora	L'anarchico pazzo	
1946	The Adulteress	Il vecchio indovino	
1946	Eugenia Grandet	Eugenia's father	
1946	The Lovers	Alviso Foscarini	
1946	The Ways of Sin	Don Salvatore	
1946	Tempesta d'anime		
1947	The Captain's Daughter	Andrej Grinev, padre di Piotr	
1947	Bullet for Stefano	Stefano's Father	
1947	Daniele Cortis	Aldo	
1948	The Man with the Grey Glove	Pittore Masero	
1949	The Legend of Faust		
1950	Devotion	Zio Zua	
1950	Hearts at Sea	Ammiraglio Silvestri - nonno di Paolo	
1950	The Thief of Venice	Il doge	
1951	The Forbidden Christ	Bruno's Father	
1951	Nobody's Children	Don Demetrio	
1952	The Adventures of Mandrin	Prince Guido	
1952	Little World of Don Camillo	Ciro della Bruciata	
1952	The Dream of Zorro	Don Cesar Alcazan	
1952	The City Stands Trial	The Chief Prosecutor	
1952	Falsehood	Don Clemente	
1952	I tre corsari	Comte di Ventimiglia	
1952	Lieutenant Giorgio	Zio del conte	
1952	Who is Without Sin	Il sacerdote	
1953	The Merchant of Venice		
1953	Noi peccatori	Don Quirino, il prete	
1953	The Ship of Condemned Women	Pietro Silveris	
1954	The Count of Monte Cristo	L'abbé Faria (1)	
1954	Ulysses	Laerte	
1954	Guai ai vinti	Don Marzi	
1956	Rigoletto e la sua tragedia	Conte di Monterone	
1956	War and Peace	Count Kirill Bezukhov	Uncredited, (final film role)
