= Lieutenant Giorgio =

1952 film

- Directed by: Raffaello Matarazzo
- Written by: Aldo De Benedetti
- Produced by: Leo Cevenini; Dino De Laurentiis; Vittorio Martino; Carlo Ponti
- Starring: Massimo Girotti; Milly Vitale; Paul Muller
- Cinematography: Carlo Montuori
- Edited by: Mario Serandrei
- Music by: Salvatore Allegra
- Production companies: Flora Film; Ponti-De Laurentiis Cinematografica
- Distributed by: Variety Distribution
- Release date: October 1952
- Running time: 104 minutes
- Country: Italy
- Language: Italian

Lieutenant Giorgio (Italian: Il Tenente Giorgio) is a 1952 Italian historical melodrama film directed by Raffaello Matarazzo and starring Massimo Girotti, Milly Vitale and Paul Muller. It was shot at the Ponti-De Laurentiis Studios in Rome and on location around San Giovanni in Fiore in Calabria. The film's sets were designed by the art director Piero Filippone.

== Synopsis ==
In 1866 during the Risorgimento, an infantry lieutenant in Calabria fighting bandits is brought to a castle. There it is arranged for him to spend the night with a young woman, whose identity is concealed from him. Unknown to him, she is the daughter of an aristocratic family whose husband has failed to get her pregnant. Years, later, having left the army, the officer returns to the area still intrigued by the mysterious woman.

== Cast ==
- Massimo Girotti as Lt. G. Biserta
- Milly Vitale as Countess Elisa
- Paul Muller as Count Stefano di Monserrato
- Gualtiero Tumiati as Stefano's Uncle
- Teresa Franchini as Amalia
- Eduardo Ciannelli as Barone di Polia
- Achille Millo as Baroncino di Polia
- Ludmilla Dudarova as Cousin of Elisa
- Nino Pavese as Cafiero, il tutore
- Luigi Pavese as Cafiero
- Enzo Fiermonte as Antonio Esposito
- Rita Livesi as Marianna
- Michele Malaspina as Doctor
- Enzo Biliotti as Notaio Piovenda
- Ada Colangeli as Evelina
- Carlo Delle Piane as Postiglione

== Bibliography ==
- Aprà, Adriano. The Fabulous Thirties: Italian cinema 1929-1944. Electa International, 1979.
- Chiti, Roberto & Poppi, Roberto. Dizionario del cinema italiano: Dal 1945 al 1959. Gremese Editore, 1991.
