= Sunday in August =

1950 film

- Directed by: Luciano Emmer
- Written by: Sergio Amidei; Franco Brusati; Luciano Emmer; Giulio Macchi; Cesare Zavattini
- Produced by: Sergio Amidei
- Starring: Vera Carmi; Marcello Mastroianni; Emilio Cigoli; Massimo Serato
- Cinematography: Leonida Barboni
- Edited by: Jolanda Benvenuti
- Music by: Roman Vlad
- Production company: Colonna Film
- Distributed by: Fincine
- Release date: 7 March 1950
- Running time: 88 minutes
- Country: Italy
- Language: Italian

Sunday in August (Italian: Domenica d'agosto) is a 1950 Italian comedy drama film directed by Luciano Emmer and starring Vera Carmi, Marcello Mastroianni, Emilio Cigoli and Massimo Serato. It earned just under 150 million lire at the domestic box office. The film was nominated for a BAFTA. In 2008, the film was included on the Italian Ministry of Cultural Heritage's Hundred Italian films to be saved, a list of 100 films that "have changed the collective memory of the country between 1942 and 1978".

== Cast ==
- Anna Baldini as Marcella Meloni
- Vera Carmi as Adriana
- Emilio Cigoli as Alberto Mantovani
- Franco Interlenghi as Enrico
- Elvy Lissiak as Luciana
- Massimo Serato as Roberto
- Mario Vitale as Renato
- Marcello Mastroianni as Ercole Nardi
- Anna Medici as Rosetta
- Andrea Compagnoni as Cesare Meloni
- Ave Ninchi as Fernanda Meloni
- Salvo Libassi as Perrone
- Jone Morino as Mesmè

== Bibliography ==
- Chiti, Roberto & Poppi, Roberto. Dizionario del cinema italiano: Dal 1945 al 1959. Gremese Editore, 1991.
