= The White Angel (1955 film) =

- Directed by: Raffaello Matarazzo
- Written by: Aldo De Benedetti; Giovanna Soria; Piero Pierotti; Raffaello Matarazzo
- Produced by: Goffredo Lombardo Raffaello Matarazzo
- Starring: Amedeo Nazzari; Yvonne Sanson
- Cinematography: Tonino Delli Colli
- Edited by: Mario Serandrei
- Music by: Michele Cozzoli
- Production companies: Titanus; Labor Films
- Release date: 18 April 1955
- Running time: 100 minutes
- Country: Italy
- Language: Italian

L'angelo bianco (internationally released as The White Angel) is a 1955 Italian melodrama film directed by Raffaello Matarazzo. It is the sequel to Nobody's Children (1951). According to the author Louis Bayman, this couple of films "sealed director Raffaello Matarazzo's reputation as king of the Italian melodramatists".

The film's sets were designed by the art director Ottavio Scotti. The screenplay was written by Aldo De Benedetti, and the story was written by Giovanna Soria and Piero Pierotti.

== Cast ==
- Amedeo Nazzari as Guido Carani
- Yvonne Sanson as Lina Marcolin/Luisa Fanti
- Enrico Olivieri as Bruno Carani
- Enrica Dyrell as Elena Carani
- Alberto Farnese as Poldo
- Flora Lillo as Flora
- Philippe Hersent as Mario La Torre
- Nerio Bernardi as avvocato Rossi
- Virgilio Riento as dottor Marini
- Olga Solbelli as madre superiora
- Ignazio Balsamo as poliziotto
- Franca Parisi as cameriera
- Emilio Cigoli as direttore della prigione
- Rina Franchetti as prigioniera
- Silvana Jachino as prigioniera
- Paola Quattrini as Anna Carani
