= Gustavo Lombardo =

Italian film producer

- Born: 3 September 1885; Naples, Campania, Italy
- Died: 15 March 1951 (aged 65); Rome, Lazio, Italy
- Occupation: Producer
- Years active: 1918–1943
- Known for: Founding Titanus

Gustavo Lombardo (1885–1951) was an Italian film producer. He founded the Naples-based production company Lombardo Film in 1917, having previously made his reputation in film distribution. He was married to the actress Leda Gys who starred in his company's films He later moved his operations to Rome, setting up Titanus which he ran until his death in 1951. He was succeeded by his son Goffredo Lombardo.

== Selected filmography ==
- Hands Off Me! (1937)
- Mad Animals (1939)
- The White Angel (1943)

== Bibliography ==
- Moliterno, Gino. The A to Z of Italian Cinema. Scarecrow Press, 2009.
