= Nobody's Children (1951 film) =

1951 film

- DVD cover
- Directed by: Raffaello Matarazzo
- Written by: Ruggero Rindi (novel); Aldo De Benedetti; Raffaello Matarazzo
- Produced by: Goffredo Lombardo; Raffaello Matarazzo
- Starring: Amedeo Nazzari; Yvonne Sanson; Françoise Rosay
- Cinematography: Rodolfo Lombardi
- Edited by: Mario Serandrei
- Music by: Salvatore Allegra
- Production companies: Titanus; Labor Films
- Distributed by: Titanus
- Release date: 22 November 1951
- Running time: 102 minutes
- Countries: France; Italy
- Language: Italian

Nobody's Children (Italian: I figli di nessuno) is a 1951 French-Italian melodrama film directed by Raffaello Matarazzo and starring Amedeo Nazzari, Yvonne Sanson and Françoise Rosay. It is one of a series of melodramas co-starring Nazzari and Sanson, which were very popular at the box office. The owner of a marble quarry falls in love with the daughter with one of his employees, and they have a baby together. However his mother attempts to sabotage the relationship with tragic consequences.

It was followed by the 1955 sequel The White Angel.

== Cast ==
- Amedeo Nazzari: Guido Canali
- Yvonne Sanson: Luisa Fanti/Sister Addolorata
- Françoise Rosay: Contessa Canali
- Folco Lulli: Anselmo Vannini
- Enrica Dyrell: Elena
- Teresa Franchini: Marta
- Gualtiero Tumiati: Padre Demetrio
- Alberto Farnese: Poldo
- Aristide Baghetti: Bernardo Fanti, father of Luisa
- Enrico Glori: Rinaldi
- Olga Solbelli: Mother Superior
- Nino Marchesini: il dottore
- Rita Livesi: la suora
- Giulio Tomasini: Antonio
- Enrico Olivieri: Bruno
- Rosalia Randazzo: Alda
- Felice Minotti: custode
- Loris Gizzi: direttore del collegio

== Bibliography ==
- Moliterno, Gino. The A to Z of Italian Cinema. Scarecrow Press, 2009.
