= Raffaello Matarazzo =

Italian filmmaker

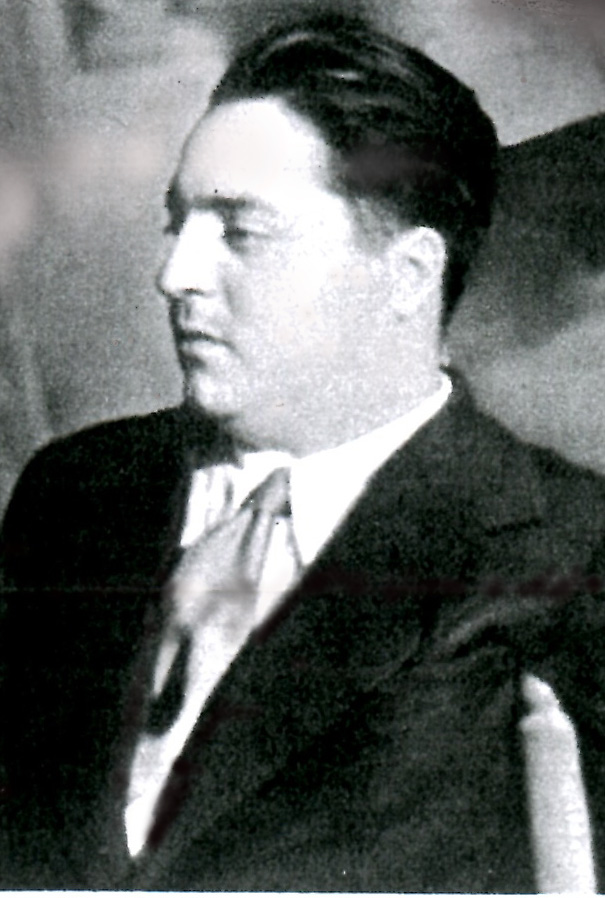
- Raffaello Matarazzo (1936)
- Born: 17 August 1909; Rome, Italy
- Died: 17 May 1966 (aged 56); Rome, Lazio, Italy
- Occupation: Filmmaker

Raffaello Matarazzo (17 August 1909 – 17 May 1966) was an Italian filmmaker.

== Life ==
Matarazzo started writing film reviews for the Roman newspaper Il Tevere before re-editing scripts for the Italian film company Cines. His first films were comedies until he shifted to making melodramas. With Chains, produced by Titanus in 1949, he became the most successful director in Italy. Audience loved his melodramas. Critics, however, have tended to disparage his work, saying that Matarazzo films were Neorealismo d'appendice (neorealism wannabe). Since the 1970s, some film critics have tried to restore Matarazzo's reputation. French magazine Positif loved his erotic-historical peplum Ship of Lost Women.

== Filmography ==
- The Telephone Operator (1932)
- Littoria (1933)
- Fanny (1933)
- Tourist Train (1933)
- Unripe Fruit (1934)
- Kiki (1934)
- The Serpent's Fang (Il serpente a sonagli) (1935)
- Joe the Red (1936)
- The Ambassador (1936)
- The Anonymous Roylott (1936)
- The Carnival Is Here Again (1937)
- It Was I! (1937)
- The Hotel of the Absent (1939)
- The Marquis of Ruvolito (1939)
- Giù il sipario (1940)
- Love Trap (1940)
- Lucky Night (1941)
- The Adventuress from the Floor Above (1941)
- Wedding Day (1942)
- Dora o le spie (1943)
- Il birichino di papà (1943)
- Empezó en boda (1944)
- Lo sciopero dei milioni (1947)
- The Opium Den (1947)
- Paolo e Francesca (1949)
- Chains (1949)
- Torment (1950)
- Nobody's Children (1951)
- Lieutenant Giorgio (1952)
- Who is Without Sin (1952)
- Vortice (1953)
- Ship of Lost Women (La nave delle donne maledette) (1953)
- Torna! (1953)
- The Life and Music of Giuseppe Verdi (Giuseppe Verdi) (1953)
- Schiava del peccato (1954)
- Guai ai vinti (1954)
- The White Angel (1955)
- The Intruder (1956)
- Rice Girl (1956)
- L'ultima violenza (1957)
- Melancholic Autumn (1958)
- Cerasella (1959)
- I terribili sette (1963)
- Adultero lui, adultera lei (1963)
- Amore mio (1964)
