= Teresa Franchini =

Italian stage and film actress

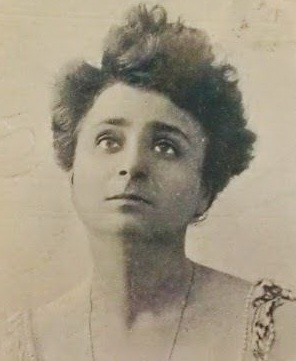
- Born: 19 September 1877; Torre Pedrera di Rimini, Emilia-Romagna, Kingdom of Italy
- Died: 11 August 1972 (aged 94); Santarcangelo di Romagna, Rimini, Italy
- Occupation: Actress
- Years active: 1935–1960 (film)

Teresa Franchini (19 September 1877 – 11 August 1972) was an Italian stage and film actress. She was a leading lady of the theatre in her youth, appearing in the first Italian staging of Oscar Wilde's Lady Windermere's Fan in 1905. Beginning in 1935, she played supporting roles in around twenty films.

== Biography ==
Teresa Franchini was born on 19 September 1877 in Torre Pedrera di Rimini, Emilia-Romagna, Italy. She was an actress, known for Sleeping Beauty (1942), Tormento (1950), and Chains (1949). She was married to Mario Fumagalli (1904-1936). She died on 11 August 1972 in Sant'Arcangelo di Romagna, Emilia-Romagna.

== Selected filmography ==
- Lorenzino de' Medici (1935)
- Sleeping Beauty (1942)
- Street of the Five Moons (1942)
- Souls in Turmoil (1942)
- Rita of Cascia (1943)
- Chains (1949)
- Torment (1950)
- Nobody's Children (1951)
- Who is Without Sin (1952)
- Lieutenant Giorgio (1952)
- Torna! (1953)
- Sins of Rome (1953)
- Noi peccatori (1953)
