= Aldo De Benedetti =

Italian screenwriter (1892–1970)

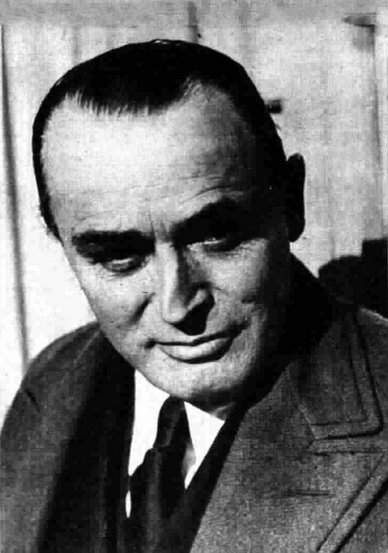
- Born: 13 August 1892; Rome, Italy
- Died: 19 January 1970 (aged 77); Rome, Italy
- Occupation: Screenwriter
- Years active: 1920–1958

Aldo De Benedetti (13 August 1892 – 19 January 1970) was an Italian screenwriter. He wrote for more than 110 films between 1920 and 1958. He was born and died in Rome, Italy.

== Selected filmography ==
- Marco Visconti (1925)
- What Scoundrels Men Are! (1932)
- Mr. Desire (1934)
- Just Married (1934)
- The Countess of Parma (1936)
- Music in the Square (1936)
- Thirty Seconds of Love (1936)
- Sette giorni all'altro mondo (1936)
- Lohengrin (1936)
- The Last Days of Pompeo (1937)
- The Carnival Is Here Again (1937)
- Mother Song (1937)
- These Children (1937)
- Triumph of Love (1938)
- Nonna Felicità (1938)
- They've Kidnapped a Man (1938)
- The House of Shame (1938)
- The Lady in White (1938)
- The Faceless Voice (1939)
- We Were Seven Sisters (1939)
- We Were Seven Widows (1939)
- Unjustified Absence (1939)
- Mille chilometri al minuto (1939)
- Red Roses (1940)
- Red Tavern (1940)
- Two on a Vacation (1940)
- Invisible Chains (1942)
- Sealed Lips (1942)
- Four Steps in the Clouds (1942)
- Nothing New Tonight (1942)
- Apparition (1943)
- Life Is Beautiful (1943)
- Music on the Run (1943)
- Life Begins Anew (1945)
- My Widow and I (1945)
- His Young Wife (1945)
- Departure at Seven (1946)
- A Yank in Rome (1946)
- Adam and the Serpent (1946)
- The White Primrose (1947)
- The Other (1947)
- Twenty Years (1949)
- Chains (1949)
- Little Lady (1949)
- Night Taxi (1950)
- Torment (1950)
- The Merry Widower (1950)
- Nobody's Children (1951)
- Five Paupers in an Automobile (1952)
- Who is Without Sin (1952)
- Lieutenant Giorgio (1952)
- Via Padova 46 (1953)
- Schiava del peccato (1954)
- Orient Express (1954)
- L'ultimo amante (1955)
- The White Angel (1955)
- Eighteen Year Olds (1955)
- Melancholic Autumn (1958)
