= Mario Serandrei =

Italian film editor (1907–1966)

- Born: 23 May 1907; Naples, Italy
- Died: 17 April 1966 (aged 58); Rome, Italy
- Occupation(s): Film editor, screenwriter

Mario Serandrei (23 May 1907 – 17 April 1966) was an Italian film editor and screenwriter.

Born in Naples, he started in the film industry in 1931 as an assistant director. He edited over two hundred films during his career, and worked steadily until his death in 1966. As an editor, Serandrei's credits included Federico Fellini's Il bidone (1955), Pietro Francisci's Hercules (1958) and Hercules Unchained (1959), Valerio Zurlini's Violent Summer (1959), La ragazza con la valigia (1961) and Cronaca familiare (1962), and the Robert Aldrich/Sergio Leone film of Sodom and Gomorrah (1963). He enjoyed a long working relationship with director Luchino Visconti, editing Ossessione (1943), Bellissima (1951), Senso (1954), Rocco and His Brothers (1960) and The Leopard (1963).

At the end of his career, he edited many films directed by Mario Bava, including Black Sunday (1960) (which he also co-wrote), Black Sabbath (1963), and Blood and Black Lace (1965).

== Selected filmography ==
- Before the Jury (1931)
- Abandonment (1940)
- Two on a Vacation (1940)
- The Secret of Villa Paradiso (1940)
- The Betrothed (1941)
- A Pistol Shot (1942)
- Jealousy (1942)
- Happy Days (1942)
- The Taming of the Shrew (1942)
- Headlights in the Fog (1942)
- The Jester's Supper (1942)
- Street of the Five Moons (1942)
- Farewell Love! (1943)
- The Priest's Hat (1944)
- The Devil Goes to Boarding School (1944)
- The Ways of Sin (1946)
- The Unknown Man of San Marino (1946)
- The Models of Margutta (1946)
- Last Love (1947)
- Eleonora Duse (1947)
- Prelude to Madness (1948)
- Chains (1949)
- Torment (1950)
- The Beggar's Daughter (1950)
- Pact with the Devil (1950)
- Women and Brigands (1950)
- Nobody's Children (1951)
- Without a Flag (1951)
- The Counterfeiters (1951)
- Red Shirts (1952)
- I'm the Hero (1952)
- The Legend of the Piave (1952)
- Who is Without Sin (1952)
- Sardinian Vendetta (1952)
- The Enemy (1952)
- Lieutenant Giorgio (1952)
- Falsehood (1952)
- Woman of the Red Sea (1953)
- Captain Phantom (1953)
- Too Young for Love (1953)
- Matrimonial Agency (1953)
- The Three Thieves (1954)
- A Parisian in Rome (1954)
- Mata Hari's Daughter (1954)
- The Beach (1954)
- Goodbye Naples (1955)
- The White Angel (1955)
- Melancholic Autumn (1958)
- Legs of Gold (1958)
- Revolt of the Mercenaries (1961)
- The Legion's Last Patrol (1962)
- Those Two in the Legion (1962)
- Black Sabbath (1963)
- Beautiful Families (1964)
