= Titanus =

Italian film company

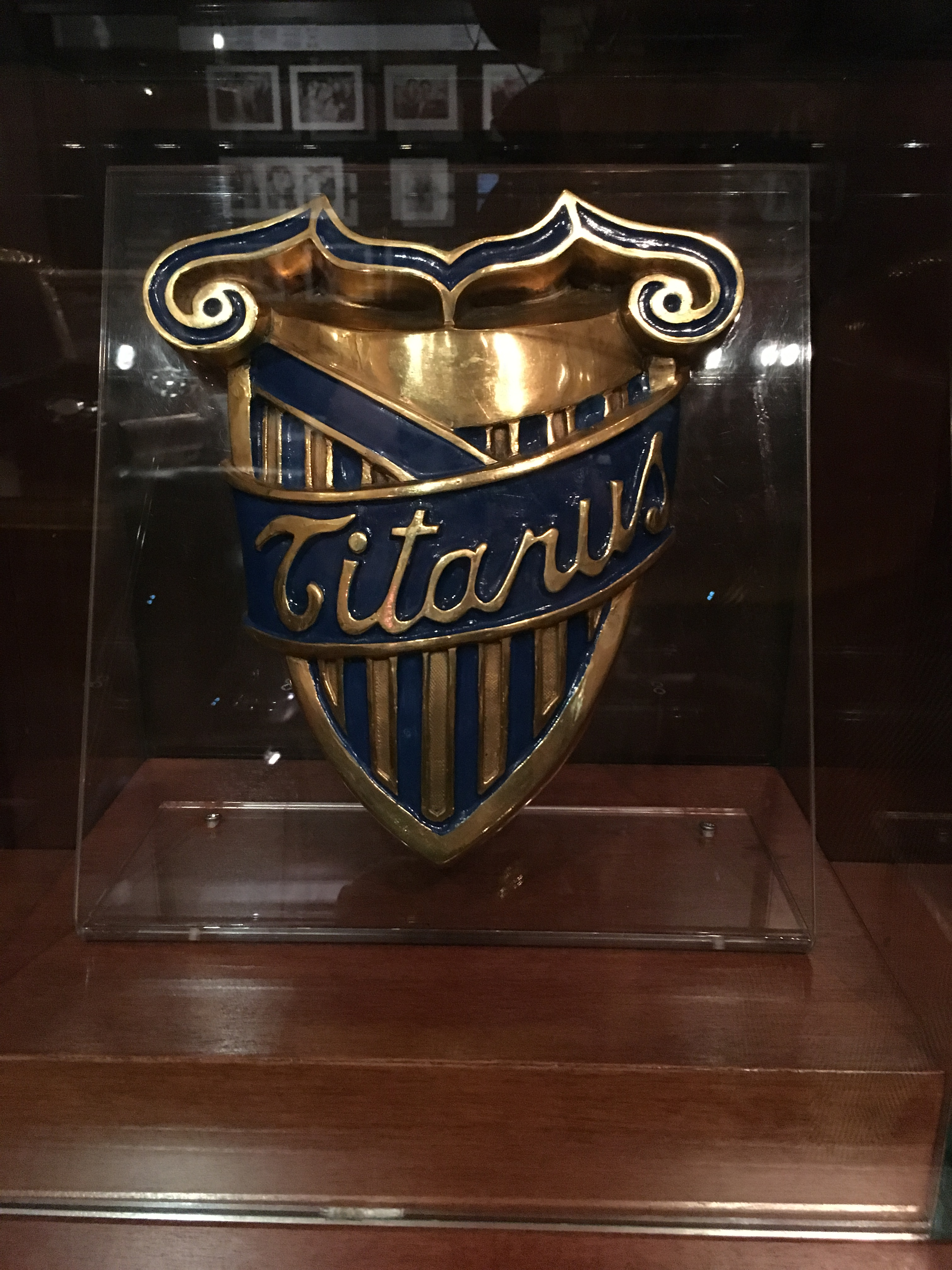
- Formerly: Lombardo Film (1904-1928; 1931)
- Type: Società per azioni (S.p.A.)
- Industry: Cinema
- Predecessor: Monopolio Lombardo
- Founded: 1904; 122 years ago
- Founder: Gustavo Lombardo
- Headquarters: Rome, Italy
- Revenue: ▲€2 million (2024)
- Net income: ▲€1,8 million (2024)
- Parent: Titanus Holdings S.p.A.
- Divisions: Titanus Produzione; Titanus Distribuzione; Titanus Internazionale
- Subsidiaries: Titanus Elios (joint-venture with Mediaset)
- Website: titanus.it

Titanus (also called Titanus Distribuzione) is an Italian film production and distribution company, founded in Naples in 1904 as Monopolio Lombardo by Gustavo Lombardo (1885–1951). It was relocated in Rome since 1929. The company's headquarters are located at 28 Via Sommacampagna, Rome and its studios on the Via Tiburtina, 13 km from the centre of Rome. The logo is a gold shield. Titanus is the third oldest film company in the world still in operation, just behind the two French companies Gaumont (1895) and Pathé (1896).

== History ==
After the arrival of the French new wave films, Titanus launched a "youth operation", which gave young film artists a chance to create low-budget films with relative freedom. This had approximately 100 first and second productions for Titanus made between 1960 and 1965. This included films by new directors such as Ermanno Olmi, Elio Petri, Damiano Damiani and Lina Wertmuller. Titanus mostly closed down its production branch in 1964, but the company remained active but as since then focused to television.

Titanus has reopened its production branch since 2023, moving all newer films out from inside production to outside production. Its first film produced since then is Elena del ghetto (2026).

== Selected films ==
- Nobody's Children (1951)
- The Overcoat (1952)
- Rome 11:00 (1952)
- Storms (1953)
- Bread, Love and Dreams (1953)
- Bread, Love and Jealousy (1954)
- We, the Women (1953)
- Land of the Pharaohs (1955)
- The Sign of Venus (1955)
- Il bidone (1955)
- Scandal in Sorrento (1955)
- The Roof (1956)
- Poor, But Handsome (1957)
- Seven Hills of Rome (1958)
- The Naked Maja (1958)
- The Magistrate (1959)
- The Law (1959)
- Violent Summer (1959)
- Web of Passion (1959)
- Purple Noon (1960)
- The Angel Wore Red (1960)
- The Hole (1960)
- A Breath of Scandal (1960)
- Rocco and His Brothers (1960)
- Audace colpo dei soliti ignoti (1960)
- Il Posto (1961)
- The Lovemakers (1961)
- Girl with a Suitcase (1961)
- On the Tiger's Back (1961)
- The Seven Deadly Sins (1962)
- The Four Days of Naples (1962)
- Arsène Lupin Versus Arsène Lupin (1962)
- Family Diary (1962)
- The Condemned of Altona (1962)
- The Leopard (1963)
- Sodom and Gomorrah (1963)
- The Shortest Day (1963)
- The Fiances (1963)
- The Tigers of Mompracem (1970)
- Indian Summer (1972)
- Sinbad and the Caliph of Baghdad (1973)
- Help Me Dream (1981)
- Dagger Eyes (1983)
- One Kiss (2016)
- Elena del ghetto (2026)

== See also ==
- List of Italian companies
