= I Vampiri =

- Italian theatrical release poster
- Directed by: Riccardo Freda
- Screenplay by: Piero Regnoli; Riccardo Freda
- Story by: Piero Regnoli
- Produced by: Ermanno Donati; Luigi Carpentieri
- Starring: Gianna Maria Canale; Carlo D'Angelo; Dario Michaelis; Wandisa Guida; Antoine Balpêtré; Paul Müller
- Cinematography: Mario Bava
- Edited by: Roberto Cinquini
- Music by: Roman Vlad
- Production companies: Titanus Produzione; Athena Cinematografica
- Distributed by: Titanus
- Release date: 5 April 1957 (Italy)
- Running time: 81 minutes
- Country: Italy
- Language: Italian
- Budget: ₤142 million
- Box office: ₤125.3 million

I Vampiri (lit. The Vampires) is a 1957 Italian horror film directed by Riccardo Freda and completed by the film's cinematographer, Mario Bava. It stars Gianna Maria Canale, Carlo D'Angelo, Dario Michaelis, Wandisa Guida, Paul Müller and Antoine Balpêtré. The film is about a series of murders of young women who are found with their blood drained. The newspapers report on a killer known as the Vampire, which prompts young journalist Pierre Lantin to research the crimes. Lantin investigates the mysterious Du Grand family who lives in a castle occupied by Giselle Du Grand who is in love with Lantin. She lives with her aunt, who hides her face behind a veil, as well as the scientist Julien Du Grand, who is trying to find the secret to eternal youth.

The film was developed during a growth in the Italian film industry which allowed for the market to expand beyond a local Italian audience and would allow Italian film makers to explore new genres of filmmaking. Freda made a deal with producers at the Italian film studio Titanus to create a low budget horror film by writing a story in one day and filming it in two weeks. The producers agreed and Freda began filming. On the final day of shooting, Freda left the set which led to the cinematographer Mario Bava to direct the rest of the film, which changed various plot points and added the inclusion of stock footage.

On the film's release in 1957, it became Italy's first horror film of the sound era. It was not successful in Italy, which Freda interpreted as an audience not interested in horror films made by Italians. The film was re-edited and released theatrically as The Devil's Commandment and Lust of the Vampire in the United States and United Kingdom respectively. English critics predominantly discuss the film in terms of its cinematography and place in film history. Despite being the first of the Italian horror films, it was not until the British film Dracula (1958) and the international hit Black Sunday were released that a greater amount of horror films began being produced in Italy.

== Plot ==
In Paris, a series of mysterious killings are committed against young women of the same blood type who are found dead and drained of their blood. The press reported these killings as being performed by a murderer coined "The Vampire". The journalist Pierre Lantin begins to investigate and becomes more involved when his fiancée, the dancer Nora Duval, is kidnapped. As Inspector Chantal examines the crime scene, Lantin arrives predicting that the crime was committed by the Vampire. Lantin investigates the school that the latest murder happened at to search for clues and finds that the woman was being followed by a tall man before the murder.

Elsewhere, a man named Joseph begs for "his fix" in a dark room, but is told to go after a woman named Laurette and that he "knows what to do" at Rue Saint Etienne. Joseph arrives at the location and is spotted by Lantin, but manages to get away from him. Joseph arrives at the clinic of Professor Julien Du Grand and demands money to leave town or he will report what is happening to the police. He is strangled by Du Grand's assistant when a shadowed woman named Margherita arrives and states that if the police track them down, it will be the end of Du Grand's career. A newspaper headline later reveals that the Professor has died unexpectedly.

After a funeral procession for Julien, a group of men arrive and reveal that the body buried was that of Joseph. Joseph's corpse is taken to a castle, where he is experimented on by Julien who is attempting to discover the secret for eternal life. Later, Laurette meets a blind man in the street who asks her to drop off a letter. On dropping the letter off, she is kidnapped and finds herself locked in a bedroom with the skeletons of the Vampire's previous victims.

As the police try and track down Laurette's kidnappers, Lantin is reassigned from following the Vampire story and is set to cover a ball at the castle of Du Grand. At the castle, he meets Giselle, who expresses admiration for Lantin as he reminds her of his father. Lantin leaves the party and is pursued by the photographer Ronald. Lantin states he does not want to lead on Giselle with her emotions, which leads to Ronald re-entering the castle to profess his love for Giselle. Giselle turns him down as her face begins to grow old before his eyes and she reveals that each person killed restores her youth for a short time. Knowing her secret is his death warrant as she reaches for a pistol and murders Ronald. Giselle then calls upon Professor Julien to make her eternally young. Julien states that under her fragile emotional state it may not work, but begins an experimental transfer of Laurette's youth and beauty to Giselle.

Giselle meets Pierre the next day when she is picking up a painting where he spots odd behavior in her such as writing with the wrong hand, which leads him to return to her castle to investigate further. Giselle begins growing ill from her previous experiment and calls upon Professor Du Grand to aid her. As he leaves, Joseph awakens in Du Grand's lab. Pierre triggers an alarm, which has him race out the castle where he meets the disoriented Joseph. Pierre takes Joseph to the police station where he reveals he was the kidnapper of the young women, but the people in the castle are the real murderers.

The police arrive looking for Margherita, but only find Giselle who denies any knowledge of Joseph. Pierre and the police explore the castle without finding clues. On leaving, Giselle begins transforming back into Margherita before their eyes, prompting for an emergency search of the castle. A gun battle ensues between Du Grand's assistant and the police, leaving the assistant and Du Grand shot. This leads the police to open his grave, where they find Laurette. Laurette is sent home and Inspector Chantal reveals that Giselle confessed to the crimes and died shortly after.

== Cast ==
- Gianna Maria Canale as Giselle du Grand / Duchess Margherita du Grand
- Carlo D'Angelo as Inspector Chantal
- Dario Michaelis as Pierre Lantin
- Wandisa Guida as Laurette Robert
- Antoine Balpêtré as Dr. Julien du Grand
- Angelo Galassi as Ronald Fontaine
- Paul Müller as Joseph Signoret
- Charles Fernley Fawcett as Laurette's father
- Miranda Campa as Laurette's mother
- Renato Tontini as Professor du Grand’s assistant
- Gisella Mancinotti as Nora Duval

Uncredited

- Riccardo Freda as Police pathologist
- Piero Regnoli as Mr. Bourgeois, news editor
- Emilio Petacci as Art dealer
- Al Lewis as Assistant (US cut only)

== Production ==
=== Background and development ===
Around the time I Vampiri was in development, Italian film productions had grown exponentially. Italian film productions rose from 25 films in 1945, to 204 in 1954. This growth allowed film makers in Italy to approach new genres and new styles not attempted before. In 1956, the chief executive officer of Titanus, Goffredo Lombardo, stated that Italian film productions should be aimed a European market opposed to just an Italian one. During the production of the film Beatrice Cenci (1956), director Riccardo Freda and his friend, cinematographer Mario Bava discussed the idea of developing a horror film. Horror films had been previously banned in Italy during the 1930s and 1940s, while a new taste for the macabre was developing. Italian film historian Goffredo Fofi stated in 1963 that "ghosts, monsters and the taste for the horrible appears when a society that became wealthy and evolves by industrializing, and are accompanied by a state of well-being which began to exist and expand in Italy only since a few years"

Freda's ambition to make a horror film derived from his desire to make films in the fantastique style, feeling that only the Americans and German expressionists were able to make such films in the past. Freda approached film producer Luigi Carpentieri with the idea of the film despite not having a treatment ready. Promising them that he would have something for them by the next day, he returned with a tape of his treatment that was complete with sound effects. Carpentieri phoned Goffredo Lombardo to convince him further. Freda followed up his tape with the promise that his script could pass the censors and could be filmed in 12 days. This convinced the producer who allowed Freda to create what became I Vampiri. I Vampiri was a low-budget production with Donati and Capentieri of Athena and Lombardo's Titanus investing 32 million lire each initially into the film. The initial budget was 97,000,000 Italian lire which increased to 142,000,000 for its post-production and release after the film's format was switched to panoramic CinemaScope.

=== Pre-production ===
The screenplay of I Vampiri is credited to Piero Regnoli and the fictional writer and scenarist Rijk Sijöstrom. The story of the film features contributions from Freda, who has only mentioned Regnoli during the writing process. Both Freda and Regnoli have uncredited roles in the film as the autopsy doctor and Mr. Bourgeois respectively. Freda had the film set in the 1950s opposed the 18th or 19th Century to lower the cost of re-creating a period set as well as making the film's plot feel like it could actually happen. The film's story borrows from uncredited stories. This includes the crimes committed by Gianna Maria Canale's character Giselle Du Grand, which are based upon the legend of Elizabeth Bathory who bathed in the blood of virgins to stay young. Another influence that Freda acknowledged was Edgar Allan Poe's short story "The Fall of the House of Usher", with its suggested parallel between decaying, dissipated interiors and the Canale's vampire-like character.

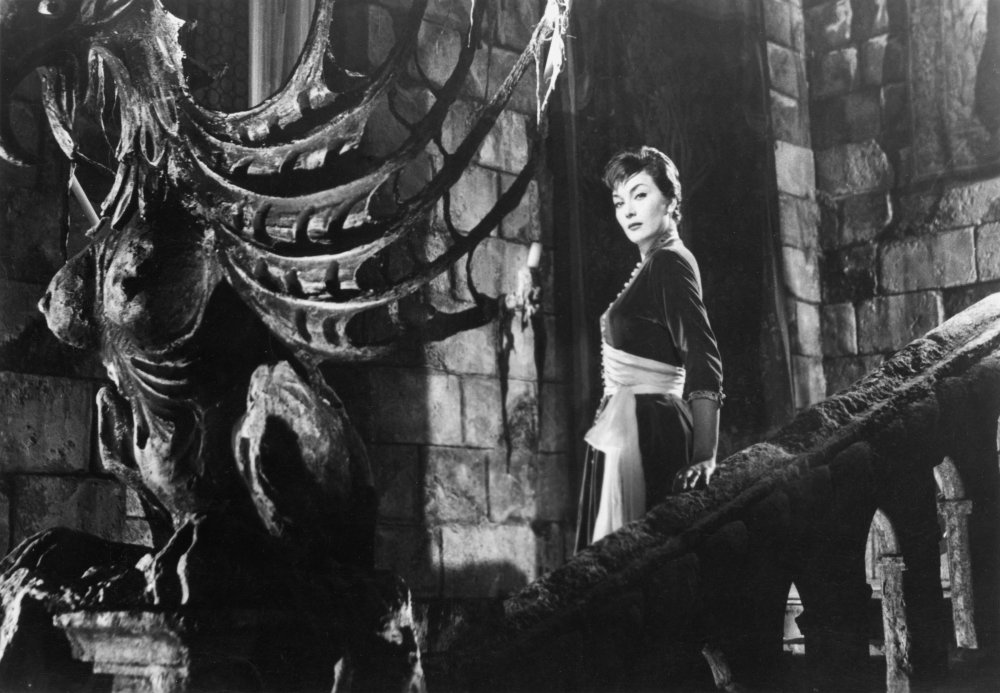
Gianna Maria Canale as Giselle Du Grand in I Vampiri, which would be the last film that director Riccardo Freda and her would work on together

Gianna Maria Canale took the female lead in the film, despite not initially wanting the role. The film was the last of her many films she made with Freda. Freda and Canale had first worked together on Il cavaliere misterioso (1948); their relationship led to Freda leaving his wife to go with Canale to Brazil where they made two more films. On their return to Italy, Canale would have the female lead role in nearly all his films including The Iron Swordsman, Sins of Rome and Theodora, Slave Empress.

=== Production ===
==== Under Freda ====
Filming began in Rome in 1956. The film was a low budget production as Lombardo did not care for horror films. Freda and his crew utilized mostly existing sets with only a single scene at the Aniene river filmed outside the studio. The film was shot in black-and-white by cinematographer Mario Bava, who felt that that style would better suit the special effects in the film and keep the budget down. Bava worked on the special effects on the film without credit. One of his effects involved Gianna Maria Canale aging make-up that would only be revealed when certain coloured lights were revealed on her. This effect had been done previously in older films, such as Dr. Jekyll and Mr. Hyde (1931) and contemporary films, including The Man Who Turned to Stone (1957).

==== Under Bava ====
Freda's deal with his producers failed when he left the set on the 12th day of production. After an argument with the producers, Freda left the production allowing Mario Bava to step in to finish the film in the next two days. Reasons for Freda leaving production differ and range from Freda having a misunderstanding with the producers to Bava stating that Freda was taking too long to make the film. Bava's ending was different than Freda's initial ending, which involved finding the heroine hanged. Among the changes Bava made to finish the film included changing the supporting character of the journalist Pierre becoming the lead and removing a subplot about a dismembered criminal who returns to life on being reassembled. Bava also extended other portions of the film with stock footage and montages of newspaper presses.

== Release ==
I Vampiri was released in Italy on 5 April 1957 in San Remo. It grossed a total of 125.3 million Italian lire on its initial theatrical run. The film was not a box office success in either Italy or France. It was released in the U.S. in 1960 in a heavily altered version under the title The Devil's Commandment. This version of the film featured new scenes written by J. V. Rhems and filmed by Ronald Honthauer in New York, and featured actor Al Lewis. In the United Kingdom, the film was released under the title Lust of the Vampire. Mario Bava biographer Tim Lucas wrote in 1992 that another version of the film, also titled Lust of the Vampire, was assembled in the U.S., which incorporated scenes of nudity.

=== Home media ===
A photonovel version of I Vampiri was released in Italy. Photonovels were similar to comic strips in that they use a succession of panels and speech captions. The main difference is that they rely on photographs of films as opposed to illustrations. I Vampiri's photonovel was titled Quella che voleva amare (English: The One Who Wanted to Be Loved), which appeared in I Vostri Film in August 1958.

I Vampiri was released uncut for the first time on DVD in the United States on June 12, 2001 by Image Entertainment. IGN gave a positive review of the DVD, referring to the image quality as "stunning" and that the film was the original cut, "not the butchered Devil's Commandment version aired on late night television over the years." It was also released on DVD as a bonus feature from Arrow Films on their Black Sunday Blu-ray on February 4, 2013.

== Critical reception ==
In a contemporary review, The Monthly Film Bulletin described the film as a "bizarre and grisly Italian effort" that "drags in everything from drug addiction to perpetual youth, crypts to skeletons, but has only a few moments which can claim to be genuinely macabre." The review praised the special effects involving a transition between a young to aged woman and back again, and concluded that "if only story, treatment and performance ... had been comparable, the film might have been really high in its class." Variety described the film as an "attempt at a horror film which doesn't quite come off with only a few moments in succeeding in being chilling." The review concluded that the film was "strictly for devotees of the genre" In Italy, La Stampa noted the surprise that the film avoided being banned by Italian censors and that when the film takes on thriller motives, it achieves some effective moments.

In their retrospective review, Craig Butler of AllMovie wrote "While I Vampiri is more important for its place in history than for it ultimate effectiveness as a film, it is nevertheless an entertaining horror flick." Danny Shipka, who discussed this film in his book on European exploitation films, noted that the film "set the standard for visual style that would be the foundation for most Italian gothic films of this nature." He also described the film as "a little ponderous and talky" while praising Canale's transformation scenes and the "masterful filming of cobwebs, creaking doors, and decay, along with great lighting". IGN wrote that "anyone interested in the history of [Italian horror cinema] should see the film" and that the film was "showing its age and is incredibly tame compared with the gore shockers that Italy would eventually become famous for". Martyn Conterio, in his book on Black Sunday stated that it would be "pushing it to declare I Vampiri as a neglected masterpiece, but it is a hugely underrated work and very cleverly sets out what a horror film with a modern edge and sensibility could achieve." Louis Paul wrote a negative review of the film in his book Italian Horror Film Directors, opining that the film suffered some damaging influences from neorealistic cinema, which turned on very static scenes. He also opined that the film spends too much time with Dario Michaelis character, and the "mind-numbingly dull and endless police procedural scenes"

== Aftermath and influence ==
Freda felt that I Vampiri did not succeed financially in Italy due to the country's audience reluctance to an Italian interpretation of the horror genre. For Freda's next film, Caltiki – The Immortal Monster, he used an English pseudonym of Robert Hampton to give the impression that the film was not Italian. Freda attempted a Gothic horror film again five years later with his film The Horrible Dr. Hichcock. Other crew members would go on to direct horror films following I Vampiri, such as screenwriter Piero Regnoli, who directed The Playgirls and the Vampire (1960) and Bava, who became the cinematographer on Freda's Caltiki as well as directing Black Sunday (1960).

I Vampiri was the first Italian horror film of the sound era, following the lone silent horror film Il mostro di Frankenstein (1920) However, it did not start a new wave of Italian horror productions. The British Film Institute stated that it required the international success of Mario Bava's Black Sunday to initiate the start of horror film production in Italy. Italian screenwriter Ernesto Gastaldi suggested that it was when Terence Fisher's film Dracula (1958) was released in Italy that a "hailstorm of vampire movies flooded the screens".

== See also ==
- List of horror films of the 1950s
- List of Italian films of 1957
