= Piero Palermini =

Italian actor

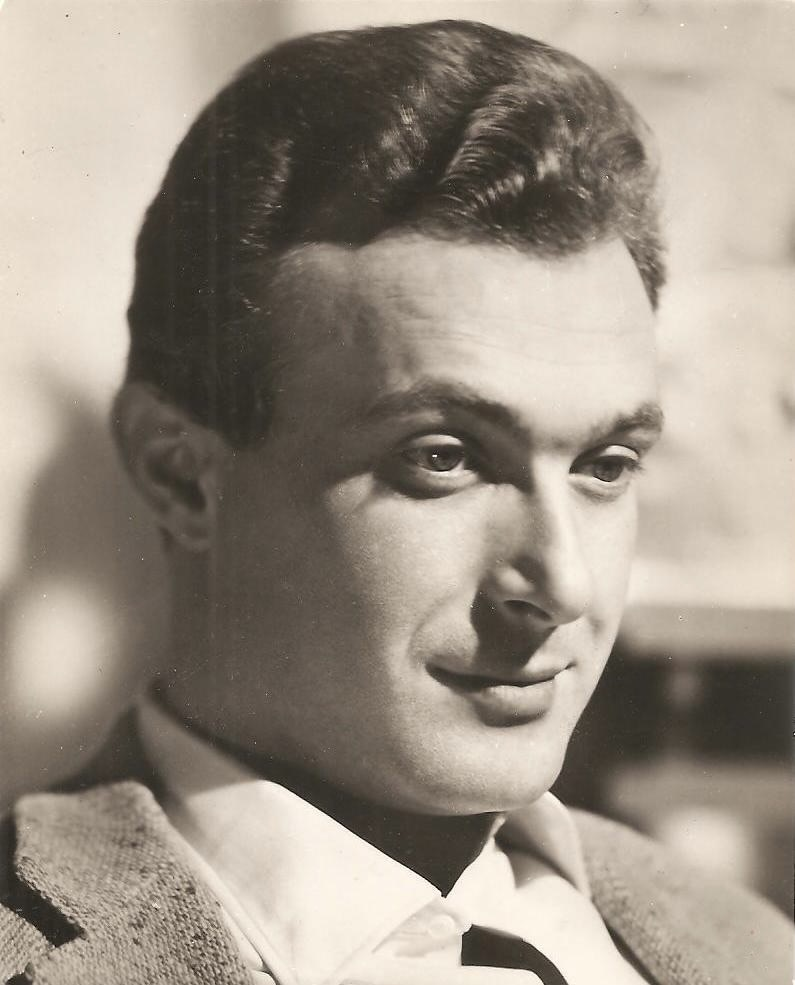
- Born: 18 September 1925; Rome, Lazio, Italy
- Died: 28 January 1996 (aged 70); Rome, Lazio, Italy
- Occupation: Actor
- Years active: 1942–1985 (film & TV)

Piero Palermini (18 September 1925 – 28 January 1996) was an Italian film actor. He was cast by Riccardo Freda in the 1949 swashbuckler, possibly due to a physical resemblance to the Hollywood actor Gene Kelly. Freda would come to regret this casting although Palermini would again appear for him in his 1950 production Son of d'Artagnan.

== Filmography ==
Year	Title	Role	Notes
1942	A Pilot Returns	Un giovane ufficiale inglese	
1942	Sleeping Beauty		Uncredited
1943	Giacomo the Idealist		
1943	Special Correspondents	Il giovane tenente	
1946	Paese senza pace		
1947	To Live in Peace	Franco	
1947	The Captain's Daughter	Dimitri	Uncredited
1947	Fire Over the Sea	Il brigante gentile	
1948	Cab Number 13		
1948	Fire Over the Sea	Rio Marani	
1948	Calamità d'oro	Armando	
1948	Nennella		
1949	Buried Alive	Giorgio	
1949	The Iron Swordsman	Balduccio Ubaldini	
1949	Il falco rosso	Gilberto	
1950	Faddija – La legge della vendetta	Saru	
1950	Son of d'Artagnan	Raoul d'Artagnan	
1951	O.K. Nerone	Marcus	
1952	Ha da venì... don Calogero!		
1953	Good Folk's Sunday	Pieri	
1953	Voice of Silence	Partigiano	
1953	Puccini	Fontana	
1954	La prigioniera di Amalfi		
1954	Cose da pazzi	Enrico	
1954	Napoli terra d'amore	Il delegato del P.S.	
1954	Loves of Three Queens	Segment: The Face That Launched a Thousand Ships	Uncredited
1954	Amore e smarrimento	Paolo Fabbri	
1955	Beautiful but Dangerous		Uncredited
1956	The Intruder	Schoolteacher	
1956	War and Peace	Russian Artillery Lieutenant	Uncredited
1956	The Violent Patriot		
1956	The Knight of the Black Sword	Ludovico	
1956	I miliardari	Fabrizio	
1957	Saranno uomini		
1957	Vecchio cinema... che passione!		
1958	Adorabili e bugiarde	Vittorio	
1960	The Night They Killed Rasputin	Le chef de la conspiration	Uncredited
1961	Queen of the Nile	Nagor	
1961	Duel of Champions	Nevio	
1962	Planets Against Us	Ufficiale italiano	
1962	Toto vs. Maciste	Baitan	
1962	La bellezza di Ippolita		
1962	Lo sgarro	Pietro	
1962	Charge of the Black Lancers		
1962	Caesar the Conqueror	Quintus Sabino	
1962	A Queen for Caesar	Afranio	
1963	The Fall of Rome	Valerio	
1969	The Battle of El Alamein		
1975	Gambling City		
1976	Prisoner of Passion		
1976	My Sister in Law	Car Salesman	
1977	Goodbye & Amen	Berto	
1985	Mussolini and I	Farinacci	TV Mini-Series, 2 episodes, (final appearance)

== Bibliography ==
- Curti, Roberto. Riccardo Freda: The Life and Works of a Born Filmmaker. McFarland, 2017.
