= Nerio Bernardi =

Italian actor (1899–1971)

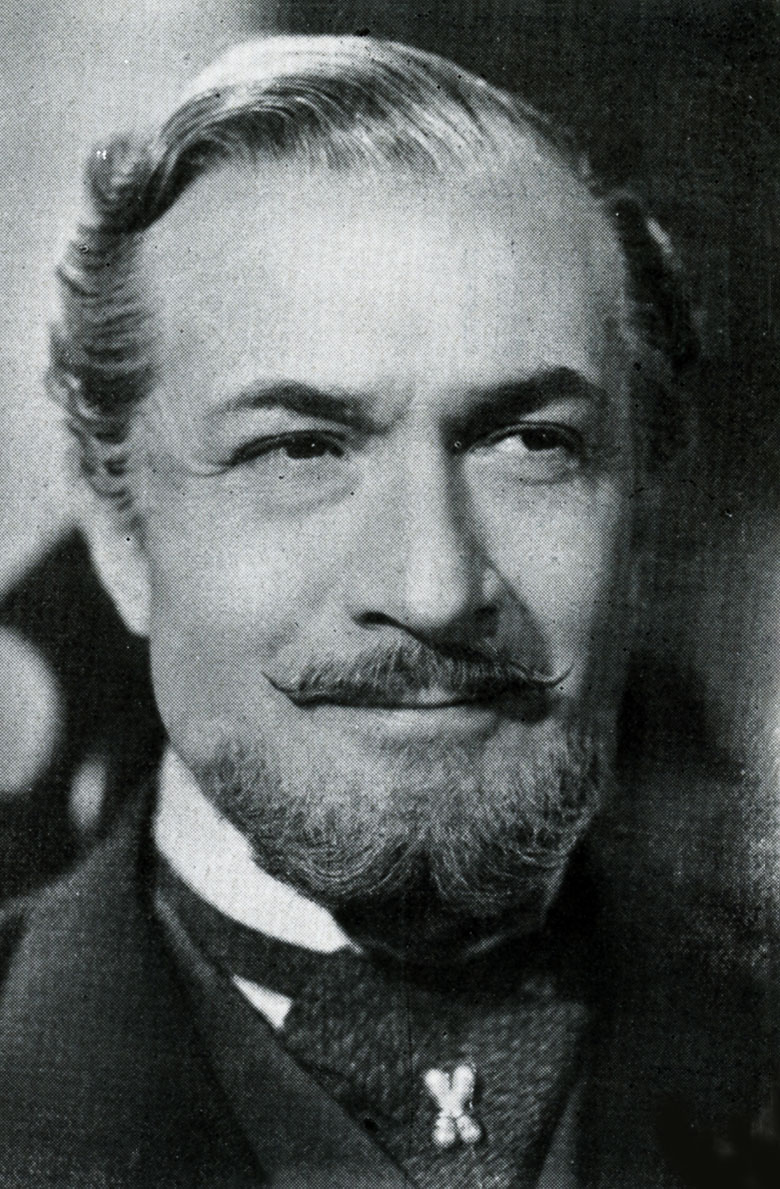
- Born: 23 July 1899; Bologna, Kingdom of Italy
- Died: 12 January 1971 (aged 71); Rome, Italy
- Occupation: Actor
- Years active: 1918–1970

Nerino "Nerio" Bernardi (23 July 1899 – 12 January 1971) was an Italian stage and film actor. He appeared in nearly 200 films between 1918 and 1970.

== Life and career ==
Born in Bologna, Bernardi started his acting career in 1918 with a local film company, Felsina Film. Specialized in young lover roles, he soon became very popular and in high demand by other companies, being even signed by Fox Film for two Violet Mersereau vehicles, Nero and The Shepherd King.

In 1923, Bernardi left silent cinema to focus on theater, where he worked with Alda Borelli, Maria Melato, Max Reinhardt, and Renato Simoni, among others. He made his film comeback in 1934, being since then mainly cast in character roles. In 1943, to escape World War II, he moved to Spain, where he started a dog grooming business. Returned in Italy in 1947, he reprised his career, notably working on stage with Ermete Zacconi, Luchino Visconti, Ruggero Ruggeri, and Vittorio Gassman. Between 1952 and 1969, he was a professor at the Accademia Nazionale di Arte Drammatica Silvio D'Amico.

== Selected filmography ==
- Marinella (1918)
- Rebus (1918)
- Il gorgo fascinatore (1919)
- La casa in rovina (1920)
- Il mulino (1920)
- Musica profana (1920)
- La buona figliola (1920)
- La modella (1920)
- L'eredità di Caino (1921)
- Fior d'amore (1921)
- Caterina (1921)
- La maschera (1921)
- Il filo d'Arianna (1921)
- La voce del cuore (1921)
- Giovanna la pallida (1921) - Orazio
- Una notte senza domani (1921)
- Bolscevismo! (1922)
- La vittima (1922)
- Nero (1922) - The Apostle
- Il castello della malinconia (1922)
- Miss Dollar (1922)
- The Shepherd King (1923) - David
- Loyalty of Love (1934) - Il conte Federico Confalonieri
- Full Speed (1934) - Il principe Huerta - detto Bob
- Port (1934) - Pietro Sgamba
- God's Will Be Done (1936) - Il cavaliere Amendoli
- King of Diamonds (1936) - L'avvocato Lorenzi
- The Black Corsair (1937) - Van Gould, Gouverneur von Maracaibo
- Bayonet (1938)
- Mille chilometri al minuto! (1939)
- Processo e morte di Socrate (1939) - Il giudice
- Una lampada alla finestra (1940)
- Antonio Meucci (1940) - Alexander Graham Bell
- Incanto di mezzanotte (1940) - Il tenente Du Brissac & Papanin
- The Birth of Salome (1940) - Il re dei Parti
- Abandonment (1940) - Ridaud
- Captain Fracasse (1940) - Il principe
- Lucrezia Borgia (1940) - Alfonso d'Este
- The Mask of Cesare Borgia (1941) - Il padre di Jacopo
- The Last Dance (1941) - Il pittore Blanche
- The Black Panther (1942) - Il dottore Rosenberg
- The Queen of Navarre (1942) - Il marchese di Gattinara
- A che servono questi quattrini? (1942) - Michele
- La fabbrica dell'imprevisto (1942) - Il divo
- Gioco pericoloso (1942) - Andrea
- Fedora (1942) - Il pianista Boleslao Lazinsky
- Le vie del cuore (1942) - Il duca Alberto Castellani, padre di Anna
- Gli ultimi filibustieri (1943) - Il governatore di Guayaquil
- Principessina (1943) - Il principe di Torrefranca, suo padre
- L'amico delle donne (1943) - De Montegre
- Special Correspondents (1943) - Il maggiore Alessandri
- Sempre più difficile (1943) - Il principe Raimondo di Falcomarzano
- I nostri sogni (1943) - Il direttore del 'Ragno d'Oro'
- La maschera e il volto (1943) - L'etereo artista
- Il matrimonio segreto (1943)
- In High Places (1945) - Emilio Buscaglione
- The Two Orphans (1947) - Il duca Filippo
- The Courier of the King (1947)
- The Lady of the Camellias (1947) - Giuseppe Verdi (prologue)
- Genoveffa di Brabante (1947) - Ambasciatore
- La mascotte dei diavoli blu (1947)
- The Charterhouse of Parma (1948) - La mari de Fausta (uncredited)
- Heart and Soul (1948) - Maggiore De Rossi
- Legge di sangue (1948) - Il capitano
- Letter at Dawn (1948) - Augusto
- Mare Nostrum (1948) - Enrico De Paoli
- Be Seeing You, Father (1948) - Bernardine - il critico
- The Earth Cries Out (1949) - Generale britannico
- Fabiola (1949) - Imperial Messenger
- Adam and Eve (1949) - Agamennone
- The Emperor of Capri (1949) - Osvaldo
- Hand of Death (1949) - senatore Tibaldi
- The Force of Destiny (1950) - Don Angelo Saavedra
- Captain Demonio (1950) - Il granduca
- The Gay Swordsman (1950)
- Toto Looks for a Wife (1950) - Giacinto
- His Last Twelve Hours (1950) - Il baritono Gigliosi
- The Bread Peddler (1950) - Étienne Castel
- The Cadets of Gascony (1950) - Il colonnello
- The Devil in the Convent (1951) - Comm. Brina
- Abbiamo vinto! (1951)
- Beauties on Bicycles (1951) - Ufficiale medico
- Il caimano del Piave (1951) - Senatore
- Double Cross (1951) - Presidente del tribunale
- La grande rinuncia (1951)
- The Counterfeiters (1951) - Maggiori
- The Ungrateful Heart (1951) - Presidente corte d'assise
- The Young Caruso (1951) - Francesco Zucchi
- Revenge of Black Eagle (1951) - Zar Paolo III
- Never Take No for an Answer (1951) - Father Superior
- Stasera sciopero (1951)
- Never Take No for an Answer (1951) - Father Superior
- Ha fatto tredici (1951)
- Free Escape (1951)
- Licenza premio (1951) - Conte Carlo
- The Mistress of Treves (1952)
- Fanfan la Tulipe (1952) - La Franchise
- Solo per te Lucia (1952) - Luciano D'Auria
- Milady and the Musketeers (1952) - Porthos
- Son of the Hunchback (1952) - Cocardasse
- Immortal Melodies (1952) - De Lellis, professore di musica
- Sins of Rome (1953) - (uncredited)
- The Merchant of Venice (1953)
- I Piombi di Venezia (1953) - Il doge
- Il viale della speranza (1953) - Franci
- The Enchanting Enemy (1953)
- Fermi tutti... arrivo io! (1953) - Tullio Valera
- The Daughter of the Regiment (1953)
- Thérèse Raquin (1953) - Le médecin
- Martin Toccaferro (1953) - Laurence Blomfield
- Ivan, Son of the White Devil (1953)
- Condannatelo! (1953) - Il barone
- Mãos Estranhas (1954) - Minor Role (uncredited)
- The Stranger's Hand (1954) - Cretidès (segment "Lysistrata")
- Oh No, Mam'zelle (1954) - L'épicier
- Theodora, Slave Empress (1954) - Belisario
- The King's Prisoner (1954) - Saint-Maur
- Papà Pacifico (1954) - The Prosecutor
- The Doctor of the Mad (1954) - Il colonello
- The Beautiful Otero (1954) - Le grand-duc
- Loves of Three Queens (1954) - Segment: The Face That Launched a Thousand Ships (uncredited)
- The Lovers of Manon Lescaut (1954) - Barone de Forté
- Human Torpedoes (1954) - Capitano Mauri
- If You Won a Hundred Million (1954) - Commendator Galloni (segment "Il tifoso")
- Bertoldo, Bertoldino e Cacasenno (1954) - Il re
- Trieste cantico d'amore (1954) - conte di Sant'Elmo
- La tua donna (1954)
- Toto in Hell (1955) - Satana
- The White Angel (1955) - L'avvocato Rossi
- Sins of Casanova (1955) - L'inquisiteur
- Naná (1955) - Prince de Sardaigne
- Cartouche (1955) - Pedante
- Somos Homens Ou... (1955) - Lo psichiatra
- Da qui all'eredità (1955) - Commissario
- Dramma nel porto (1955)
- Altair (1956) - Colonnello
- Sunset in Naples (1956)
- Mermaid of Naples (1956) - Commendator Rossi
- The Knight of the Black Sword (1956) - Conte Roccofiorita
- Wives and Obscurities (1956)
- La rivale (1956) - Prefetto Maurizio Candi
- Mi permette babbo! (1956) - Enzo Bernard - il direttore d'orchestra
- Serenata al vento (1956)
- Kean: Genius or Scoundrel (1957) - Conte Koefeld
- Song of Naples (1957) - The Music Publisher
- S.O.S. Noronha (1957) - Le gouverneur
- Nature Girl and the Slaver (1957) - Prinz Derman
- Serenata a Maria (1957)
- The Love Specialist (1957) - (uncredited)
- La chiamavan Capinera... (1957)
- Onore e sangue (1957) - Avvocato Rossi
- Il Conte di Matera (1958) - Marquis Taldi
- Sorrisi e canzoni (1958)
- Dubrowsky (1959) - Fürst Werejski
- Prisoner of the Volga (1959) - Elagin
- Un canto nel deserto (1959)
- Caterina Sforza, la leonessa di Romagna (1959) - Bali di Digione
- Caltiki – The Immortal Monster (1959) - Police Inspector
- Attack of the Moors (1959) - King of France
- The Cossacks (1960) - General Rasumovsky
- Purple Noon (1960) - Agency Director
- La strada dei giganti (1960) - Conrad
- The Night They Killed Rasputin (1960) - Comissaroff
- Long Night in 1943 (1960) - Avvocato Attilio Villani
- Tomorrow Is My Turn (1960) - Rodier (uncredited)
- The Traffic Policeman (1960) - mons. Olivieri
- Minotaur, the Wild Beast of Crete (1960) - Re di Atene
- La Donna dei Faraoni (AKA: The Pharaoh's Woman) (1960)
- Cavalcata selvaggia (1960)
- Psycosissimo (1961) - The Professor of Physical Anthropology
- The Bacchantes (1961) - High Priest
- Blood Feud (1961)
- Laura nuda (1961) - L'amante di Adriana
- Rome 1585 (1961) - Cardinale Medici
- Vanina Vanini (1961) - Cardinale Savelli
- El Cid (1961) - Soldier (as Nelio Bernardi)
- The Trojan Horse (1961) - Agamemnon
- The Vengeance of Ursus (1961) - King Alteo
- The Corsican Brothers (1961) - Prof. Perrier
- Horace 62 (1962) - Napoléon
- Toto vs. Maciste (1962) - Faraone Ramses
- Lo sparviero dei Caraibi (1962)
- Zorro in the Court of Spain (1962) - Colonello Vargas
- Invasion 1700 (1962) - Geremia
- Caesar the Conqueror (1962) - Cicero
- The Avenger (1962) - Drance
- A Queen for Caesar (1962) - Scaurus
- Zorro and the Three Musketeers (1963) - Cardinal Richelieu
- The Invincible Masked Rider (1963) - Don Gomez
- Il terrore dei mantelli rossi (1963)
- The Swindlers (1963) - Monsignor (segment "Medico e fidanzata")
- Brennus, Enemy of Rome (1963) - Nissia's Father
- Hercules vs. Moloch (1963) - Asterion, High Priest
- Hercules and the Black Pirates (1964) - Governatore di Hermosa
- Thunder of Battle (1964) - Menenio Agripa
- I marziani hanno 12 mani (1964) - Sottosegretario esteri
- The Lion of Thebes (1964) - Xesostus
- La vendetta dei gladiatori (1964) - Tidone
- Three Swords for Rome (1964) - Adakir
- Jungle Adventurer (1965) - Grande Bramino della pagoda
- The Revenge of Ivanhoe (1965) - Donald, Dungeon master
- Latin Lovers (1965) - (segment "Gli amanti latini")
- Captain from Toledo (1965) - Don Alfonso (uncredited)
- Night of Violence (1965) - Pratesi
- Me, Me, Me... and the Others (1966)
- Kiss the Girls and Make Them Die (1966) - Papal envoy
- The Saint Lies in Wait (1966) - Cesare Pavone
- Wanted Johnny Texas (1967) - US Army General
- The Magnificent Texan (1967) - Cico
- Satanik (1968) - Professor Greaves
- Psychout for Murder (1969) - Cameriere dei Brignoli
- The Tigers of Mompracem (1970) - Grande Brahmano
