= See Naples and Die =

- Film poster
- Directed by: Riccardo Freda
- Screenplay by: Ennio De Concini; Alberto Vecchietti
- Story by: Ennio De Concini; Alberto Vecchietti
- Produced by: Umberto Momi; Carlo Caiano
- Starring: Gianna Maria Canale; Renato Baldini; Vittorio Sanipoli; Carletto Sposito
- Cinematography: Gábor Pogány
- Edited by: Otello Colangeli
- Music by: Carlo Innocenzi
- Production company: Associati Produttori Indipendenti
- Distributed by: Associati Produttori Indipendenti
- Release date: 29 March 1952 (Italy)
- Running time: 87 minutes
- Country: Italy
- Language: Italian

See Naples and Die (Italian: Vedi Napoli e poi muori) is a 1952 Italian crime-melodrama film directed by Riccardo Freda.

== Plot ==
Drug dealer Sanesi is trying to get her old friend Marisa to have her husband, a senior bank official, sing. But the official becomes convinced that Marisa is cheating on him with Sanesi and throws his wife out of the house. In order to prevent the situation from deteriorating, Marisa decides to assassinate Sanesi. A murder trial then opens against Marisa. Her acquittal in self-defense will lead Marisa and her husband to reconciliation.

== Cast ==
- Gianna Maria Canale: Marisa
- Renato Baldini: Giacomo Marini
- Vittorio Sanipoli: Roberto Sanesi
- Franca Marzi: Lover of Senesi
- Carletto Sposito
- Claudio Villa

== Production ==
Following the success of his previous film La vendetta di Aquila Nera, Riccardo Freda directed his next film produced by Umberto Momi and Carlo Caiano through their company Associati Produttori Indipendenti (A.P.I.). Freda claimed he shot the film within 15 days, with three on location in Naples and the rest in Rome at CSC studios.

The film marked the first collaboration between Freda and his longtime director of photography, Gábor Pogány. Freda commented on his collaboration with his Hungarian cinematographer, stating that "It is quite astonishing, but it was the Hungarians and the Czechs who revolutionized cinematography in Italy. Stallich, Vich and Pogany. They reinvented the use of lighting on sets... This trio remained famous in Italy the name of 'Hungarian school'".

== Release ==
See Naples and Die was distributed theatrically in Italy by Associati Produttori Indipendenti on 29 March 1952. The film grossed a total of 381,384,000 Italian lire domestically in Italy. The film was released in the United States as See Naples and Die in 1959 where it was released subtitled and distributed by Crown Pictures.

== Reception ==
Italian critic and film historian Roberto Curti stated that Italian critics "generally panned the film". On its release in the United States, the New York Times stated the film had a "sodden script" and that "Gianna Maria Canale, as that pretty, luckless lady, is involved in nearly every cliche dear to the devotees of daytime detergent dramas on radio, but unsmilingly she comes through [...] There are English titles but even without them it is fairly clear that sad is the word for the manufactured tragedies in See Naples and Die."

== See also ==
- List of Italian films of 1952
