= Carlo Jachino =

Italian composer

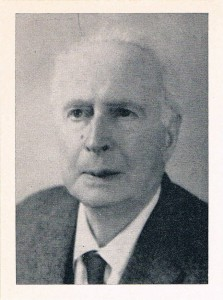
Carlo Jachino

Carlo Jachino (1887–1971) was an Italian composer of the 20th century. Born in Sanremo on February 3, 1887, he studied in Leipzig under Hugo Riemann. Jachino's 3-act opera, Giocondo and his King won a national competition in (1922) and was premiered at the Dal Verme theater in Milan in 1924. In 1928 his Second Quartet in E minor shared the second prize with Harry Waldo Warner while Béla Bartók and Alfredo Casella shared the first prize at an international chamber music competition in Philadelphia. He was a proponent of dodecaphonic or 12-tone music. He wrote extensively about music, including Instruments of the Orchestra. He taught composition at the Parma Conservatory, Naples Conservatory and Rome Conservatory between 1927 and 1950. He was the director of the Naples Conservatory from 1950 to 1953, and later director of the National Conservatory of Colombia in Bogotà. Jachino was also inspector of music curriculum for the Italian Ministry of Education.

Although a proponent of twelve-tone technique Jachino wasn't always a strict serialist. According to Reginald Smith Brindle, his Piano Concerto (1952), performed in Florence in 1955,"was a miracle in avoiding all that dodecaphony implies". His Violin Concerto, the Sonata drammatica per violino e orchestra (1920) has been recorded.

Jachino was also involved in film. He composed the score for Il figlio di d'Artagnan (1950) and acted in L'ebreo errante (1948), and in Bicycle Thieves (1948).

== Filmography ==
| Year | Title | Role | Notes |
|---|---|---|---|
| 1948 | Caccia all'uomo | | Uncredited |
| 1948 | L'ebreo errante | Muller | |
| 1948 | Bicycle Thieves | A Beggar | |
| 1948 | Guarany | | |
| 1949 | Fabíola | | (final film role) |
