= Double Cross (1951 film) =

1951 film

- French film poster
- Directed by: Riccardo Freda
- Screenplay by: Mario Monicelli; Ennio De Concini; Riccardo Freda
- Story by: Mario Monicelli
- Starring: Amedeo Nazzari; Gianna Maria Canale; Vittorio Gassman; Arnoldo Foà
- Cinematography: Enzo Serafin
- Edited by: Otello Colangeli
- Music by: Carlo Innocenzi
- Production company: S.A.F.A. Palatino
- Distributed by: Variety Distribution
- Release date: 11 April 1951 (Italy)
- Running time: 94 minutes
- Country: Italy

Double Cross (Italian: Il tradimento, also known as Treason and Passato che uccide) is a 1951 Italian crime-melodrama film directed by Riccardo Freda and starring Amedeo Nazzari, Vittorio Gassman and Gianna Maria Canale.

== Plot ==
The engineer Pietro Vanzelli is accused of killing Renato Salvi, his collaborator and suitor of his wife Clara who has always rejected him. During the trial no evidence arises in his defense and he is therefore convicted. After many years he gets out of jail and sets out in search of his family, he then learns that his wife had moved to Livorno with his daughter Luisa and on the train he accidentally runs into Renato who, when cornered, confesses to him the truth: after having stolen a lot of money from the company and after being rejected again by Clara he decided to disappear but at the same time blame Pietro for revenge. Renato also reveals to him that his wife is now dead while his daughter works as a governess for a wealthy family in Livorno, the Soldani. Luisa has formed a sincere bond with Stefano, the eldest of the children, but the family opposes this relationship and after having convinced her son to study in London they force Luisa to resign. The girl tries several times to find a job but without success, the pension owner reminds her that there are other ways to make money and that she should take advantage of them. One evening he meets Pietro who is chased from a bar where a fight had started and takes him to his room, the man suspects that the girl has acted for money and humiliates her but then speaking of the doll to which the girl is very attached he discovers in her the daughter believed lost. At this point everything seems to be going well, Pietro has found his daughter and the girl can also crown her dream of love with Stefano, since even the Soldani family has repented of how they acted. Unfortunately Renato reappears, he wants money so as not to bring back the old story and ruin Luisa's marriage, Pietro does not want to give in and is about to call the police when he is wounded with a knife by Renato, a fight ensues in which it is Renato himself to have the worst. Not knowing what to do, Pietro loads the body into the car and brings it back into the river, in the same spot where it was said he had been thrown years before but then, after having witnessed his daughter's wedding, he constitutes himself to the police. The trial is short, although he is condemned for the murder, he is recognized as legitimate defense and can return free alongside his beloved daughter.

== Cast ==
- Amedeo Nazzari as Pietro Vanzelli
- Gianna Maria Canale as Luisa
- Vittorio Gassman as Renato Salvi
- Arnoldo Foà as The Prosecutor
- Caterina Boratto as Miss Vanzelli
- Camillo Pilotto as Soldani
- Armando Francioli as Stefano Soldani
- Ciro Berardi as Gaetano Zanetti
- Anita Durante
- Attilio Dottesio as Bianchini
- Nerio Bernardi as The Judge

== Release ==
Double Cross was distributed theatrically in Italy by Variety on April 11, 1951. The film grossed a total of 311,000,000 Italian lire domestically. The film was released as Double Cross in the United States where it was dubbed in English, cut to a 77 minute running time, and directly to television.
