= Peter Baldwin (director) =

American television director and actor (1931–2017)

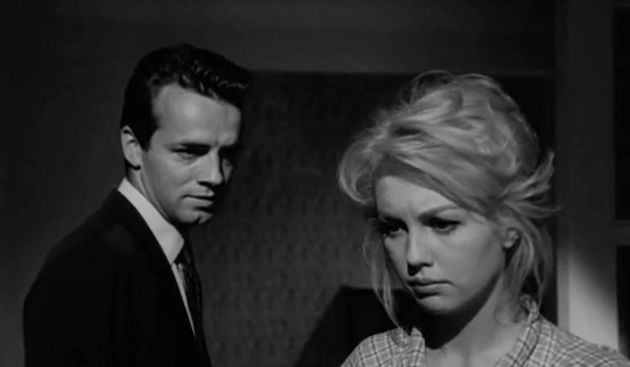
- Baldwin (left) with Mylène Demongeot in Love in Rome (1960)
- Born: Peter DuBois Baldwin; January 11, 1931; Winnetka, Illinois, U.S.
- Died: November 19, 2017 (aged 86); Pebble Beach, California, U.S.
- Education: Stanford University
- Occupations: Actor, television director
- Years active: 1952–2002
- Relatives: Vittorio De Sica (father-in-law)

Peter DuBois Baldwin (January 11, 1931 – November 19, 2017) was an American television director and actor. He was initially a contract player for Paramount Pictures, but moved to Rome in the 1960s and appeared in mainly in Italian films. After returning to the United States in the following decade, he became a prolific television director, winning a Primetime Emmy Award out of three total nominations.

== Early life and education ==
Baldwin was born in Winnetka, Illinois in 1931, and graduated from New Trier High School. During his senior year at Stanford University, he was spotted by a Paramount Pictures talent scout, and was signed to a contract as part of their "Golden Circle of Promising Newcomers" that also included William Holden, Patricia Morison, Susan Hayward and Robert Preston.

== Career ==
As a contract player for Paramount, Baldwin played Johnson in the film Stalag 17 and Lieutenant Walker in Little Boy Lost, both made in 1953. Later that year however, he left Paramount to join the United States Navy, serving for three years as an air intelligence officer. He returned to Paramount in 1956, playing a courtier in The Ten Commandments. In 1962 he played the role of murderer Tony Benson in the Perry Mason episode, "The Case of the Melancholy Marksman".

In 1960, Baldwin was recruited by Italian director Roberto Rossellini to appear in his film Escape by Night. The success of that role led Baldwin to move to Rome, and he would appear mainly in Italian films throughout the decade. He notably had leading roles in the Dino Risi romantic drama Love in Rome (also 1960), the Riccardo Freda horror film The Ghost (1963), the mystery film The Possessed (1965), and the comedic giallo The Weekend Murders (1970). He was also Vittorio De Sica's assistant director on A Place for Lovers (1968).

Baldwin eventually became a television director with an extensive résumé. As well as directing many of the episodes of ABC's hit situation comedy The Brady Bunch, he also directed episodes of other ABC hit sitcoms, The Partridge Family, from 1970 to 1971 and Benson, from 1979 to 1980. He was among the directors of episodes of the 1973 NBC sitcom Needles and Pins and of the 1985-1986 CBS sitcom Foley Square, and also helped direct a few episodes of Family Ties in 1987. He won an Emmy in 1988 for the television series The Wonder Years. His last directing credit was an episode of the Disney Channel sitcom Even Stevens in 2002.

In the 1980s, Baldwin directed the short-lived comebacks of Mary Tyler Moore in Mary in 1985 and Lucille Ball in Life with Lucy in 1986. Both lasted 13 episodes.

== Personal life ==
Baldwin was married three times. His second marriage was to talent agent Emi De Sica, the daughter of actor-director Vittorio De Sica. Their daughter, Eleonora Baldwin, is a voice actress, filmmaker and food writer.

=== Death ===
Baldwin lived with his third wife Terry Finkel in Pebble Beach, California where he died on November 19, 2017, at age 86.

== Filmography ==
=== Director ===
- ‘’The Andy Griffith Show’’ (1964, TV Series)
- Sanford and Son (1972, TV Series)
- The Living End (1972)
- The Bob Newhart Show (1973, TV series)
- The Michele Lee Show (1974, TV Series)
- Happy Days (1974, TV series)
- Great Day (1977)
- Space Force (1978)
- The Lovebirds (1979)
- Benson (1979-1980, TV Series)
- Alone at Last (1980)
- One In A Million (1980)
- The Brady Girls Get Married (1981)
- The Harlem Globetrotters on Gilligan's Island (1981)
- The Hoboken Chicken Emergency (1984)
- Lots of Luck (1985)
- Newhart (1987, TV series)
- American Film Institute Comedy Special (1987)
- A Very Brady Christmas (1988)
- Charlie Hoover (1991, TV series)
- Salute Your Shorts (1991, TV series)
- Revenge of the Nerds (1991)
- Meet Wally Sparks (1997)
- Arliss (1997, TV series)
- King's Pawn (1999)
- Driving Me Crazy (2000)

=== Actor ===
- The Turning Point (1952) - Boy (uncredited)
- The Girls of Pleasure Island (1953) - Pvt. Henry Smith
- Stalag 17 (1953) - Sgt. Johnson
- Houdini (1953) Fred - Bess' Escort (uncredited)
- Little Boy Lost (1953) - Lt. Walker
- The Ten Commandments (1956) - Courtier (uncredited)
- Short Cut to Hell (1957) - Carl Adams
- The Tin Star (1957) - Zeke McGaffey
- Teacher's Pet (1958) - Harold Miller
- The Space Children (1958) - Security Officer James
- I Married a Monster from Outer Space (1958) - Officer Hank Swanson
- The Trap (1959) - Mellon
- Escape by Night (1960) - American Lieutenant Peter Bradley
- Love in Rome (1960) - Marcello Cenni
- Quattro notti con Alba (1962) - Lieutenant Enrico Fassi
- I soliti rapinatori a Milano (1963) - Tony
- The Ghost (1963) - Dr. Charles Livingstone
- The Possessed (1965) - Bernard, the writer
- The Weekend Murders (1970) - Anthony Carter
- Roma Bene (1971) - Michele Vismara
- The Mattei Affair (1972) - McHale (final film role)
