= Stasera sciopero =

- Directed by: Mario Bonnard
- Written by: Mario Bonnard; Nicola Manzari; Alberto Vecchietti
- Starring: Virgilio Riento; Marisa Merlini
- Cinematography: Sergio Pesce
- Music by: Giulio Bonnard; Gerald Fried
- Release date: 1951
- Country: Italy
- Language: Italian

Stasera sciopero is a 1951 Italian comedy film directed by Mario Bonnard.

== Plot ==
Augusto, rich and miserly pizzicagnolo, is attacked on his way home. During the fight the attacker is fatally wounded with his own revolver. He was a poor fool, known for his incurable prodigality.

In the clinic where he is hospitalized, Augusto is subjected to a particular operation: the surgeon, after learning that a prodigal died fighting with a miser, decides to insert the brain of the poor attacker into the skull of Augustus.

The result of the operation transforms the pizzicagnolo: he experiences moments of prodigality alternating with as many relapses into avarice. In a moment of euphoria he agrees to the wedding of his daughter, always opposed for reasons of convenience, and during the wedding banquet he is hit in the head by an iron ball: finally the fusion of the two brains is completed.

== Cast ==
- Virgilio Riento as Augusto
- Marisa Merlini as Gemma
- Clelia Matania as Marta
- Carlo Croccolo as Pasquale
- Laura Gore as Anna
- Lamberto Picasso as The scientist
- Renato Mariani as The Knight
- Paul Muller as The Mad Man
- Leopoldo Valentini as The Shoe Maker
- Ciro Berardi
- Nerio Bernardi
- Marcello Martana
- Gisella Monaldi
- Jone Morino
- Anna Primula
- Gigi Reder
- Marcella Rovena
- Alberto Sorrentino
- Roberto Spiombi
- Claudio Villa
