= Beatrice Cenci (1956 film) =

1956 film

- Directed by: Riccardo Freda
- Screenplay by: Jacques Rémy; Filippo Sanjust
- Story by: Riccardo Freda; Attilio Riccio
- Starring: Micheline Presle; Gino Cervi; Fausto Tozzi
- Cinematography: Gábor Pogány
- Edited by: Riccardo Freda; Giuliana Taucer
- Music by: Franco Mannino
- Production companies: Electra Compagnia Cinematografica; Cinecittà; Franco London Films
- Distributed by: Cei-Incom
- Release date: 6 September 1956 (Italy)
- Running time: 98 minutes
- Countries: Italy; France

Beatrice Cenci is a 1956 French-Italian historical drama film directed by Riccardo Freda and starring Micheline Presle, Gino Cervi and Fausto Tozzi. It is a biopic of Beatrice Cenci, a young Roman noblewoman who murdered her abusive father, Count Francesco Cenci.

== Plot ==
In 1598, his son Giacomo, lover of his stepmother Lucrezia, was involved in the investigation into the death of Francesco Cenci, a violent and dissolute patrician. To defend him, Lucrezia accuses Olimpio Calvetti, Francesco's steward, who had helped Beatrice Cenci. Under torture, Beatrice also accuses Olimpio, but she is sentenced to death and beheaded in Castel Sant'Angelo. In the end, the judge also has Giacomo and Lucrezia locked up.

== Cast ==
- Micheline Presle as Lucrezia Cenci
- Gino Cervi as Francesco Cenci
- Fausto Tozzi as Olimpio Calvetti
- Frank Villard as Giudice Ranieri
- Claudine Dupuis as Martina
- Anthony Steffen as Giacomo Cenci
- Mireille Granelli as Beatrice Cenci
- Emilio Petacci as Marzio Catalano
- Guido Barbarisi as Un giudice
- Vittorio Vaser

== Release ==
Beatrice Cenci was distributed theatrically in Italy by Cei-Incom on 6 September 1956. It grossed a total of 223,400,000 Italian lire domestically.
