= Free Escape =

- Directed by: Duilio Coletti
- Written by: Marcello Marchesi; Vittorio Metz
- Produced by: Raffaele Colamonici; Umberto Montesi
- Starring: Nino Taranto; Ludmilla Dudarova; Laura Gore
- Cinematography: Sergio Pesce
- Edited by: Fernando Tropea
- Music by: Tarcisio Fusco
- Release date: 1951
- Running time: 90 minutes
- Country: Italy
- Language: Italian

Free Escape (Italian: Libera uscita) is a 1951 Italian comedy film directed by Duilio Coletti and starring Nino Taranto, Ludmilla Dudarova and Laura Gore.

The film's sets were designed by Alberto Boccianti. It was made at Cinecittà.

== Cast ==
- Nino Taranto as Domenico Errichiello
- Ludmilla Dudarova as Signora Quaglia
- Laura Gore as Rosetta
- Nyta Dover as Susanna
- Luigi Pavese as Signor Quaglia
- Carlo Croccolo as Pinozzo Molliconi
- Elena Altieri
- Guglielmo Inglese
- Simona Gori
- Galeazzo Benti
- Arturo Bragaglia
- Ciro Berardi
- Enrico Luzi as Regista di fotoromanzi
- Gigi Reder
- Mario Lauri
- Nerio Bernardi

== Bibliography ==
- Pasquale Sorrenti. Il cinema e la Puglia. Schena, 1984.
