= The Ghost (1963 film) =

1963 film directed by Riccardo Freda

- Italian theatrical release poster
- Directed by: Riccardo Freda
- Screenplay by: Oreste Biancoli
- Story by: Riccardo Freda; Oreste Biancoli
- Produced by: Ermanno Donati; Luigi Carpentieri
- Starring: Barbara Steele; Peter Baldwin; Elio Jotta; Harriet Medin
- Cinematography: Raffaele Masciocchi
- Edited by: Ornella Micheli
- Music by: Francesco De Masi
- Production company: Panda Cinematografica
- Distributed by: Dino De Laurentiis Cinematografica
- Release date: 30 March 1963 (Italy)
- Running time: 100 minutes
- Country: Italy
- Language: Italian
- Box office: ₤175 million

The Ghost (Italian: Lo spettro, also released as The Spectre and Lo Spettro del Dr. Hichcock) is a 1963 Italian horror film directed by Riccardo Freda (using the pseudonym "Robert Hampton"), and starring Barbara Steele, Peter Baldwin, Elio Jotta and Harriet White Medin. It is a Gothic re-imagining of Henri-Georges Clouzot's film Les Diaboliques (1955).

== Plot ==
In 1910 in Scotland, the ailing and wheelchair-bound Dr John Hichcock presides over seances in which his housekeeper, Catherine, acts as the medium. According to Hichcock's theory, shots of lethal poison followed by an antidote could cure his physical disability shortly after. The younger Dr Charles Livingstone stays with him in the house to regularly administer this dangerous treatment.

Hichcock's wife Margaret finds living with her husband increasingly unbearable. Possibly suspected by her husband, she is having an affair with Livingstone. She implores him to murder Hichcock, which he eventually does by injecting the poison but not administering the antidote. During the distribution of Hichcock's estate, Margaret and Livingstone learn Hichcock only recently changed his last will and testament. Margaret gets the house and its contents, but only a third share of her husband's bonds, shares, currency, and jewels, kept in the doctor's safe.

Upon Catherine telling them that the key to the safe containing the valuables was in the jacket buried with him, they secretly visit his vault, open his coffin and retrieve it, intending to take a larger share of the valuables. Livingstone opens the safe while Margaret is out of the room with Catherine. It is empty. Later, they hear Hichcock's voice calling to them and experience other poltergeist phenomena, including the appearance of the ghost-like Hichcock himself. One night, Catherine, apparently possessed by Hichcock, speaks in his voice and tells Margaret that his valuables are buried beneath his coffin. She returns to the vault to find a golden box. Upon opening it, she cuts herself. The box contains nothing but a skull. Catherine then insinuates that Livingstone took the valuables for himself when he opened the safe in Margaret's absence. Margaret finds jewels in his bag, much to Livingstone's surprise. Margaret slashes him to death with a razor and drags him into the cellar, where she uses kerosene from a lamp to burn his body.

Margaret is drawn to Hichcock's study by the ringing of his handbell, where she contemplates suicide by poison, pours it into a glass of gin, but does not drink it. She starts feeling ill and sits down when Hichcock appears, alive and no longer disabled. He tells her that he poisoned the box with a non-lethal dose of curare, which is now quickly paralyzing her. Hichcock shoots his accomplice Catherine dead and makes Margaret touch the gun to incriminate her. Finally, he toasts Margaret's ill health with the glass of gin she poured for herself and drinks it. When he realizes it is poisoned, he begs Margaret for the antidote. She laughs and destroys the vial of antidote. Hichcock seals himself inside a secret room behind the bookshelf, locking himself in. The police arrive and arrest the laughing and paralyzed Margaret for Catherine's murder, carrying her out of the room.

When Canon Owens, the parish priest, arrives and hears muffled noises from behind the library bookshelf, he addresses Hichcock's portrait with the words, "I told you, Dr Hichcock, the devil is a very real person." He then leaves the room.

== Cast ==
- Barbara Steele as Margaret Hichcock
- Peter Baldwin as Dr Charles Livingstone
- Elio Jotta as Dr John Hichcock
- Harriet White Medin as Catherine Wood
- Umberto Raho as Canon Owens
- Carlo Kechler as Police Superintendent
- Alberto Plebani as Albert Fisher
- Graziella Granata as Woman

== Production ==
The Ghost was shot in Rome in 12 days.

The Italian production crew are credited by aliases. The music score is credited to "Franck Wallace", whom Italian magazine Bianco e Nero and the Monthly Film Bulletin claim is a pseudonym for Franco Mannino. When Beat Records re-released the score, they found the tapes credited to Francesco De Masi who is not credited in the film. Mannino had originally written the score, but when Freda was dissatisfied with his work, he had De Masi write and record a new one in under a week.

Freda had directed Barbara Steele in the horror film The Horrible Dr. Hichcock the previous year. In that film Steele's character was also married to a Doctor Hichcock, but neither character had any connection with those in The Ghost.

== Release ==
The Ghost was released in Italy on 30 March 1963, where it was distributed by Dino de Laurentiis. The film grossed a total of £175 million lira on its theatrical release. Freda said that the censors did not object to any of the film's content.

The film was later released in the United Kingdom in February 1964 and in the United States on 18 February 1965 in Dallas.

=== Home media ===
The film was released on Blu-ray and Ultra HD Blu-ray in February 2026 by Severin Films.

== Critical reception ==
In a contemporary review, The Monthly Film Bulletin stated that "Pictorially the film is a knock-out" while the dubbed dialogue is "more inept than ever". The review concluded that The Ghost was "a splendid exercise in Grand Guignol" Leonard Maltin awarded the film two and a half out of a possible four stars complimenting the film's atmosphere, calling it a "Measured, moody horror, let down by routine plot".
