= Ha da venì... don Calogero! =

1952 film

- Directed by: Vittorio Vassarotti
- Written by: Andrea Maroni; Vittorio Vassarotti
- Cinematography: Piero Giorgi
- Edited by: Renzo Lucidi
- Music by: Gábor Pogány
- Release date: 1952
- Country: Italy
- Language: Italian

Ha da venì... don Calogero! is a 1952 Italian comedy film directed by Vittorio Vassarotti.

== Premise ==
A priest inherits a large sum of money from a former student at his elementary school and must decide how to use it best.

== Cast ==
- Barry Fitzgerald as don Calogero Mazzoni
- Lauro Gazzolo as Evaristo, il farmacista
- Lois Maxwell as la maestrina
- Arturo Bragaglia as il messo comunale
- Charles Fawcett as Don Andrea
- Una O'Connor as Angelica, la perpetua
- Cesare Fantoni as il disoccupato
- Rietta Medin as la sua moglie
- Giorgio Capecchi as il signor Ernesto
- Carlo De Santis as Alessio
- Silvana Muzi as Rosetta, la sua fidanzata
- Marcello Giorda as il sindaco
- Franco Corsaro as Leonida, il barista
- Guido Riccioli as Giovanni, il calzolaio
- Loris Gizzi as il dottore
- Franco Scandurra as l'avvocato
- Mirco Corongiu as Francesco Cesaroni, l'allievo
- Roberto Onorati as un secondo allievo
- Tina Pica
