= Double Face =

1969 film

- German film poster
- Directed by: Riccardo Freda
- Screenplay by: Riccardo Freda; Paul Hengge
- Story by: Romano Migliorini; Gianbattista Mussetto; Lucio Fulci
- Produced by: Oreste Coltellacci; Horst Wendlandt
- Starring: Klaus Kinski; Annabella Incontrera; Sydney Chaplin; Christiane Krüger; Günther Stoll; Barbara Nelli; Margaret Lee
- Cinematography: Gábor Pogány
- Edited by: Hanna Amedei; Jutta Hering
- Music by: Nora Orlandi
- Production companies: Colt Produzioni Cinematografiche; Mega Film; Rialto Film
- Distributed by: Panta Cinematografica (Italy); Constantin Film (West Germany)
- Release dates: 4 July 1969 (West Germany); 26 July 1969 (Italy)
- Running time: 80 minutes
- Countries: Italy; West Germany
- Box office: ₤175.626 million

Double Face (Italian: A doppia faccia, (Note: Although "Double Face" is a literal translation of A doppia faccia, Tim Lucas has suggested that more precise interpretations of the Italian title include "Double-Sided" or "Duplicitous".) German: Das Gesicht im Dunkeln, lit. 'The Face in the Dark') is a 1969 thriller film directed by Riccardo Freda and starring Klaus Kinski, Christiane Krüger and Annabella Incontrera. It is part of the series of Edgar Wallace adaptations made by Rialto Film.

== Plot ==
A businessman named John Alexander learns that his wealthy wife Helen has died in a car accident. After mourning, he runs afoul of some shady characters who lead him to believe that his wife is still alive.

== Cast ==
Cast information from the book Riccardo Freda: The Life and Works of a Born Filmmaker.

- Klaus Kinski as John Alexander
- Christiane Krüger as Christine
- Annabella Incontrera as Liz
- Sydney Chaplin as Mr. Brown
- Luciano Spadoni as Inspector Gordon
- Barbara Nelli as Alice
- Margaret Lee as Helen Alexander (née Brown)
- Gastone Pescucci as Peter Nader
- Günther Stoll as Inspector Stevens
- Carlo Marcolino as Butler
- Ignazio Dolce

The following cast went uncredited.

- Bedy Moratti
- Fulvio Pellegrino as A Policeman
- Domenico Ravenna as Man at a horse race

== Production ==
During the later part of director Riccardo Freda's career, the director began attempting commercially viable genres. Freda met with Italian producer Oreste Coltellacci who set up a deal with the German company Rialto who created several work in the German subgenre called the krimi. The krimis were inspired by the works of Edgar Wallace and had been popular since Harald Reinl's film Der Frosch mit der Maske (1959) In Germany, the film was promoted as being based on Das Gesicht im Dunkeln by Edgar Wallace. This was done for commercial reasons as the script had nothing to do with the book. The original story for the film was developed by Lucio Fulci, Romano Migliorini and Gianbattista Mussetto. The film's screenplay is credited to Freda and Austrian-born Paul Hengge. According to Giusti, Fulci wrote the first treatment. Fulci would claim in an interview in 1994 that he wrote the film for Freda. He disliked the film, stating that Freda had "completely crushed it down to a pulp; at that time, he just didn't care anymore." Fulci would revisit Double Face's central theme ― of a man learning that his wife has seemingly faked her death ― in his own film One on Top of the Other (1969).

When casting the film, Freda met with Klaus Kinski in Rome where Kinski initially refused to be in the film not wanting to play another psychopathic character. Freda convinced him to take the role after learning he would play the part of a victim instead.

Double Face was shot between 20 January and 15 March 1969 at the Cinecittà Studios in Rome and on location in London and Liverpool. Freda and Kinski did not get along on set, with Freda referring to him as "the Crown Prince of Assholes" and eventually proceeding to shoot the film with a Kinski double he found on the set of a Federico Fellini film. When Kinski found out about this, he put aside his differences and continued working on the film.

== Release ==
Double Face was released in West Germany on 4 July 1969 under the title of Das Gesicht im Dunkeln (lit. The Face in the Dark) with an 80 minute runtime. It was distributed in West Germany by Constantin Film GmbH. It was released theatrically in Italy as A doppia faccia on 26 July 1969 where it was distributed by Panta with a 90 minute runtime. The film grossed 175,626,000 Italian lire domestically in Italy.

It was released later in France as Liz et Helen (lit. 'Liz and Helen') and also with added adult scenes involving actress Alice Arno as Chaleur et Jouissance (lit. 'Heat and Pleasure'). It was released in the United States as Puzzle of Horrors.

== Reception ==
Film critic Marco Giusti writes that Kinski "is mad, hysterical, but dominates the film", remembers the nice intrigue around Kinski's character, and praises the lesbian scenes.

== Legacy ==
Novelist and film historian Tim Lucas has cited the scene in which John Alexander watches a stag film starring Christine and a woman he believes to be Helen due to a scar on the back of her neck as an influence on his 1994 novel Throat Sprockets.
