= La morte non conta i dollari =

1967 film

- Directed by: Riccardo Freda
- Story by: Giuseppe Masini; Riccardo Freda
- Produced by: Enrico Cogliati Dezza
- Starring: Mark Damon; Stephen Forsyth; Luciana Gilli; Pamela Tudor; Luciano Pigozzi
- Cinematography: Gábor Pogány
- Edited by: Anna Amedei
- Music by: Nora Orlandi; Robby Poitevin
- Production company: Cinecidi
- Distributed by: Warner Bros.
- Release date: 21 July 1967 (Italy)
- Running time: 92 minutes
- Country: Italy
- Language: Italian
- Box office: ₤151 million

La morte non conta i dollari (lit. Death Does Not Count the Dollars) 1967 Italian spaghetti Western film directed by Riccardo Freda. The film is about Lawrence White who returns to his hometown of Owell Rock with his sister to avenge the father's death at the hands of a gang. The leader of the gang, Doc Lester has recently appointed himself the gunslinger Boyd as the new sheriff.

La morte non conta i dollari was Freda's only Western he directed. Co-written with Giuseppe Masini, it was shot in Rome with actors Mark Damon and Luciano Pigozzi. Second unit director Yves Boisset suggested that Freda had shot the film without caring for the production and that a stuntman had even died on set. Actor Stephen Forsyth had denied any death occurring while filming.

== Plot ==
Lawrence White returns to his hometown and reopens the investigation about the murder of his father. At the same time arrives Boyd, who frequently gets into fights. Doc Lester, who is the one behind the murder, hires Boyd and makes him the sheriff to stop White. However, it turns out that "Boyd" is the real Lawrence White, while "White" is a friend of his. Rustlers kill Major White, and a witness who reports to the sheriff is later shot and has his tongue cut out. Many years later the son of major White returns in a stagecoach. It is stopped by some military, but another passenger, Boyd, discloses them as false, and they ride off. When White arrives people say that this will mean trouble for major Lester. White now tries to reopen the murder case of his father and gets into a fight with Lester's men. White's sister, on the other hand, advocates vengeance.

Boyd gets into several fights and is recruited by Lester, who has him appointed the new sheriff when the old one is killed. Elisabeth, a girl he has acquainted, now rejects him and asks him to find the murderer of her father, who has been killed by men of Lester, because he intended to help White. When he visits the widow of the former land officer, White is caught in a trap by Lester's men. She explains that they would have tortured her otherwise. Lester sends Boyd to make White confess to murder, but instead he unties White. Some Lester men now appear saying that Lester did right to check him. They start beating Boyd when the widow appears with a rifle. She is shot but Boyd gets a gun and kills them. We now learn that Boyd is the real son of major White, while "White" is his friend, a federal lawyer from Washington. White follows a lead and finds judge Warren's daughter as a prostitute in Mexico. He now can convince the judge to reopen the case. Lester's gang ambush White, but the stage is manned with dolls and explodes, and the rest of the gang is killed in the ensuing gunfight. Lester is arrested. White stays on as sheriff united with Elisabeth, while his friend leaves with White's sister.

== Cast ==
- Mark Damon as Lawrence White
- Luciana Gilli as Jane
- Stephen Forsyth as Harry Boyd
- Pamela Tudor as Lisabeth
- Luciano Pigozzi as Judge Warren
- Nello Pazzafini as Doc Lester
- Ignazio Spalla as Pedro Rodriguez
- Lydia Biondi
- Renato Chiantoni
- Dino Strano

== Themes ==
In his investigation of narrative structures in Spaghetti Western films, Fridlund ranges White with his false identity and double play in La morte non conta i dollari among the stories of infiltrators with hidden agendas that took their inspiration from A Fistful of Dollars.

== Production ==
After returning to the Italian film industry, Freda collaborated with scriptwriter Giuseppe Masini. Freda stated that for the script, he took inspiration from Prosper Mérimée's Carmen. Second unit director Yves Boisset stated that he tried to get Klaus Kinski for the leading role in the film, but the producer did not take his suggestion. Mark Damon got the lead role in the film, having previously starred in other Italian Western's including Johnny Oro (1966) and Johnny Yuma (1966).

The film was predominantly shot in the hills around Rome. Actor Stephen Forsyth stated that Freda took care of the whole shooting noting that "in general it would be unusual for any scenes with dialogue and principal actors to be done without the director present." Boisset described Freda's attitude towards the film while directing as indifferent, stating that "during shooting everybody ceased to care. Freda was not the only one responsible for that; there was also the climate of vulgarity on the part of the producers, but he accommodated. I think Riccardo got enguled in a ghetto by himself, working with third-rate producers and actors." In his autobiography, Boisset recalls directions of scenes such as the filming of a saloon brawl which are not in the film and claims that the film was shot at the same time as another production with the same cast and crew. Forsyth stated that "two films being shot together is news to me" Boisset also recalled a fatality on set involving a stuntman, which Forsyth also denied happening. Italian film historian Roberto Curti stated that no other sources outside Boisset reported the death.

== Release ==
La morte non conta i dollari credits have Freda using the alias George Lincoln. Freda has stated that his edit of the film was "destroyed" by censors and that "I had little resources, and they cut the most violent scenes....But I insist, I wrote the scenario, it was a cruel film." Despite Freda's accusations, the board of censors only cut six seconds from the film on its release.

The film was distributed theatrically in Italy by Warner Bros. on July 21, 1967. The film grossed 151 million Italian lire domestically in Italy. Curti described the film's reception as "almost unnoticed" in Italy. Freda also disliked the title of the film, feeling that it "doesn't mean anything., neither in French, nor in English, and not even in Italian!" On the film's release in Denmark, it was released as Johnny Yma vender tilbage, a sequel to Romolo Guerrieri's Johnny Yuma which also starred Damon. The film has been released in the United States under various titles, including Death at Owell Rock, No Killing Without Dollars and Death Does Not Count the Dollars.

== See also ==
- List of Italian films of 1967
