= The Horrible Dr. Hichcock =

1962 film directed by Riccardo Freda

- Italian theatrical release poster
- Italian: L'orribile segreto del Dr. Hichcock
- Directed by: Riccardo Freda
- Written by: Ernesto Gastaldi
- Produced by: Luigi Carpentieri; Ermanno Donati
- Starring: Barbara Steele; Robert Flemyng
- Cinematography: Raffaele Masiocchi
- Edited by: Ornella Micheli
- Music by: Roman Vlad
- Production company: Panda Cinematografica
- Distributed by: Warner Bros. (Italy)
- Release date: 30 June 1962 (Italy)
- Running time: 84 minutes
- Country: Italy
- Budget: ₤96 million
- Box office: ₤142 million

The Horrible Dr. Hichcock (Italian: L'orribile segreto del Dr. Hichcock, lit. 'The horrible secret of Dr. Hichcock'; released in the United Kingdom as The Terror of Dr. Hichcock) is a 1962 Italian gothic horror film directed by Riccardo Freda, written by Ernesto Gastaldi, and starring Barbara Steele, Robert Flemyng, Silvano Tranquilli, and Harriet White Medin.

The film was released in Italy by Warner Bros. on June 30, 1962. Freda's The Ghost, the following year, features the same leads and the surname Hichcock, but is not connected in terms of plot.

== Plot ==
London, 1885. Respected physician Dr. Bernard Hichcock hides a dark secret - he is a necrophiliac who drugs his wife, Margaretha, for sexual funeral games. One night, he accidentally administers an overdose of a new drug which slows the heart rate and thinks he has killed her. After burying her in a crypt, he leaves London.

12 years later, he remarries and returns to his old home. His new wife, Cynthia, starts to believe that she sees Margaretha around the house. After Cynthia falls victim to Dr. Hichcock's old parlour games, she suspects he is trying to kill her, but she finds that the truth is much worse. Having realised that Margaretha is still alive but looking haggard from her ordeal, Dr. Hichcock plans to kill Cynthia and use her blood to restore Margaretha's beauty.

== Cast ==
- Barbara Steele as Cynthia Hichcock
- Robert Flemyng as Dr. Bernard Hichcock
- Silvano Tranquilli as Dr. Kurt Lowe
- Maria Teresa Vianello as Margaretha Hichcock
  - Vera Drudi as aged Margretha
- Harriet White as Martha
- Evaristo Signorini as Inspector Scott
- Howard Nelson Rubien as Lab Technician
- Neil Robinson as Hospital Assistant

== Production ==
=== Writing ===
Unlike director Riccardo Freda's previous Gothic-styled film I vampiri, The Horrible Dr. Hichcock was made in a climate where there were more Gothic horror films being produced in Italy. The film began when Luigi Carpentieri phoned screenwriter Ernesto Gastaldi to write a giallo story that he liked, titled Spectral. Gastaldi wrote his own treatment under the title Raptus. The original script did not contain the necrophilia that is in the film, which Gastaldi commented that he did not remember why he added it, suggesting that "perhaps one of the associates asked for something harder, more macabre". Freda later claimed that the story was his idea, proclaiming that "It is entirely my idea. I nurtured it for a long time but it is Ernesto Gastaldi, a very good scenarist, who shaped it into form." Gastaldi commented on this, saying that when he met Freda, they did not discuss the film with him and that producer Ermanno Donati gave Freda the script, saying "Let's see if you have the balls to shoot this stuff, it's about corpses!" Gastaldi stated that Freda did not even read the script and replied "As long as I get paid, I'm shooting even the phone book."

=== Casting ===
The film's co-star Barbara Steele took 10 days off the set of Federico Fellini's 8½ to perform her role in the film. Co-star Robert Flemyng, who was predominantly working in television at the time, took the script, as he wanted to go to Rome. After reading the script, titled Raptus, he only later found the film involved necrophilia and attempted to get out of the film. His agent stated it was too late, as he had signed the contract, so he went forward with making the film. The actress Harriet Medin had been working in Italy since the end of World War II. She received a call from Flemyng before shooting, suggesting that they act so badly that the film would not be released. She is listed in the film credits under her maiden name, Harriet White.

The Italian cast and crew hid their names under Anglophone-sounding names; this included Freda being credited as Robert Hampton, while set designer Franco Fumagalli became Frank Smokecocks, a literal translation of his last name. Each cast member spoke his or her own language when filming.

=== Filming ===
The film was shot at Villa Perucchetti in Rome.

There are different recollections as to how long the film took to make; the schedule was from April 9 to May 5, 1962, with a 96 million lire budget. Freda stated the film was finished in two weeks, while film historians Alan Upchurch and Tim Lucas state that it was shot in 14 days. Marcello Avallone, who worked on the film with Gastaldi, stated that it took three weeks. Steele recalled that production had long 18-hour days "thanks to the massive doses of Sambuca and coffee. If a dolly collapsed, Freda would just pull the camera on a carpet. Nothing would stop that man."

To film everything, Freda sped up proceedings by having three small crews work on the film at once. One of the crews was entrusted to Avallone, who Freda had bonded over through their mutual love of horse racing. Avallone stated that he shot things like close-ups and cutaways to save time. Avallone mentioned that two versions of some sequences were shot: the original Italian, which was more suggestive and chaste, and another for foreign markets that was more risque, as Freda did not want to shoot the more explicit scenes. As of 2017, those versions have not been found. The assistant cameraman, Giuseppe Maccari, played down the second units, stating that multiple cameras were used only on some scenes, such as the climax with the fire in Hichock's villa.

The film's make-up artist, Euclide Santoli, recalled the grotesque scenes where Hichcock's face swells and deforms right before the camera. To do the effect, Santoli used a double mask, with the first being thick and identical to the actor's face; it would be applied first, then a second mask that was thin was stuck to the other along the edges with tubes used to blow air through them. Freda later stated that the producers ruined the scenes with this special effect. Freda stated the producers had them split the nightmare scene into several pieces, instead of having it done as one long take.

== Release ==
The Horrible Dr. Hichcock was submitted to the board of censors in June 1962 where it was given the V.M.18 rating, becoming the first horror film to receive this rating after the new rating system was made in April 1962. Despite the directors' and other sources' claims, the board of censors did not demand that there be any cuts to the film. It was released in Italy on 30 June 1962 and was distributed by Warner Bros.

=== Alternate versions ===
The film was initially retitled Raptus: The Secret of Dr. Hichcock and offered to American International Pictures by Donati and Carpentieri. The company turned it down, as they could not have it toned down for general audiences in the United States.

It was released in October 1964 in the United States as The Horrible Dr. Hitchcock, where it was distributed by Sigma III Corporation as a double feature with The Awful Dr. Orloff. The American version was re-dubbed and cut to 76 minutes, which re-arranged scenes, added dissolves and was not always faithful to Gastaldi's original script.

British audiences saw it the next year, where it was retitled The Terror of Dr. Hichcock.

== Reception ==
=== Box office ===
The film grossed a total of 142 million Italian lira on its theatrical run. Box office returns in Italy were considered strong enough that, when Ricardo Blasco's Spanish film Autopsy of a Criminal (1963) was released in Italy, it was promoted as a follow-up, titled L'assassino del dott. Hitchkok.

=== Critical response ===
From a contemporary review, The New York Times reviewed both The Horrible Dr. Hichcock and The Awful Dr. Orloff and stated "For once, the adjectives in the titles were not only descriptive but also accurate." In France, Positif described the film as to "seem a hymn to necrophilia [...] the storms, the excesses, the veneer of a modern chirurgical décor to cover a stylised rococo background, even the photography dominated by fascinating and artificial flashes of color". The Monthly Film Bulletin declared the film "consistently gripping and enjoyable", despite numerous borrowing from numerous sources, including Vampyr, Jane Eyre, Rebecca and Strange Case of Dr. Jekyll and Mr. Hyde; the "guiding hands of director Riccardo Freda and cameraman Raffaelle Masciocchi are unmistakable" noting the use of colour, light, editing and "visually striking compositions."

Glenn Erickson wrote an essay called "The Horrible Dr. Hichcock: Women on the Verge of a Gothic Breakdown" and stated "The outrageous central concern of The Horrible Dr. Hichcock has never been considered appropriate for any film openly advertised and exhibited to the public, horror or otherwise. That a film about the frustrated passions of a necrophiliac could even be released in 1962 is a censorial mystery in its own right -- or, perhaps, a clear testament to the way horror films were officially ignored on every cultural level back then." Meanwhile, the film has been praised as "a unique Italian gothic" with authentic sets, particularly artful acting by Flemyng and Barbara Steele at her best.

== Novelization ==
In 2015, a novelization of the film by Michael R. Hudson was published in the United States by Raven Head Press as part of a series of adaptations of several of Gastaldi's scripts, including My Name is Nobody and The Case of the Bloody Iris.

== See also ==
- List of horror films of 1962
- List of Italian films of 1962
