= Caesar the Conqueror =

1962 film

- Directed by: Tanio Boccia
- Written by: Gaius Julius Caesar (book "De Bello Gallico"); Arpad DeRiso (writer); George Higgins II (English dialogue); Nino Scolaro (writer)
- Produced by: Roberto Capitani (producer); Luigi Mondello (producer); René Thévenet (associate producer)
- Starring: Cameron Mitchell; Rik Battaglia; Dominique Wilms; Ivica Pajer; Raffaella Carrà; Carla Calò; Nerio Bernardi
- Cinematography: Romolo Garroni
- Edited by: Tanio Boccia
- Music by: Guido Robuschi; Gian Stellari
- Release date: 27 September 1962
- Country: Italy
- Language: Italian

Caesar the Conqueror (Italian: Giulio Cesare, il conquistatore delle Gallie) is a 1962 Italian epic historical drama film directed by Tanio Boccia. The scenario is based on Julius Caesar's Commentarii de Bello Gallico.

The plot centres around Julius Caesar's battling the rebels in Gaul.

== Synopsis ==
In 54 B.C., Julius Caesar faces battles on two fronts: in Gaul against the Gauls led by Vercingetorix, and in Rome against his political rivals, including Cicero and Pompey. Ultimately, he emerges victorious against them all.

== Cast ==
- Cameron Mitchell as Julius Caesar
- Rik Battaglia as Vercingetorix
- Dominique Wilms as Queen Astrid
- Ivica Pajer as Claudius Valerian
- Raffaella Carrà as Publia
- Carlo Tamberlani as Pompey
- Cesare Fantoni as Caius Opio
- Giulio Donnini as Eporedorix
- Nerio Bernardi as Cicero
- Carla Calò as Calpurnia
- Piero Palermini
- Bruno Tocci as Mark Anthony
- Aldo Pini as Quintus Cicero
- Lucia Randi as Clelia
- Fedele Gentile as Centurion
- Enzo Petracca as Titus Azius
- Alberto Manetti

== Biography ==
- Hughes, Howard (2011). Cinema Italiano - The Complete Guide From Classics To Cult. London - New York: I.B.Tauris. ISBN 978-1-84885-608-0.
