= Roman Vlad =

Romanian and Italian composer (1919–2013)

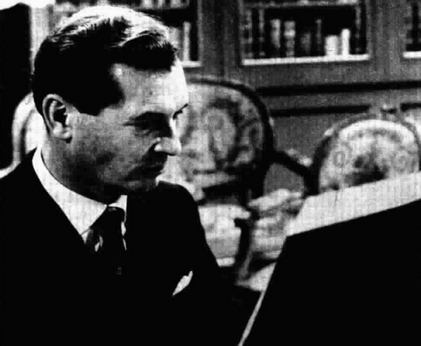
- Vlad in 1964

Background information
- Born: Cernăuți, Kingdom of Romania (now Chernivtsi, Ukraine)
- Genres: Contemporary classical; film score
- Occupations: Composer; pianist; musicologist
- Instrument: Piano

Roman Vlad (29 December 1919 – 21 September 2013) was a Romanian and Italian composer, pianist, and musicologist.

== Biography ==
Born in Cernăuți, Kingdom of Romania (now Chernivtsi, Ukraine), he studied with Titus Tarnawski and Liviu Russu in Romania earning a piano diploma. He moved to Rome in 1938 to study at the University of Rome and later the Accademia Nazionale di Santa Cecilia. He eventually became an Italian citizen in 1951.

Vlad's early career was as a performer and composer; he won the Enescu Prize in 1942 for his Sinfonietta, and the Silver Ribbon Award for his film music. He was the artistic director of Accademia Filarmonica Romana from 1955 to 1958 and again from 1966 to 1969. As well, he was the president of the Italian Society for Contemporary Music in 1960 and musical consultant for the third RAI national radio and television network. He was later a member of the Directory Council of the National Academy of Santa Cecilia and artistic consultant for the Ravenna Festival and the Spoleto Festival.

Vlad was an eclectic composer whose works range from symphonies to operas to chamber music to "The Japanese Seasons, 24 Haiku." He was a noted composer of film music, including the scores to René Clair's La Beauté du diable (1950), Pictura: An Adventure in Art (1951), Romeo and Juliet (1954), I Vampiri (1957), Son of the Red Corsair (1959), Ursus (1961) and The Horrible Dr. Hichcock (1962).

Vlad wrote significant books about music, including The History of Twelve-Tone Music (1958) and biographies of Igor Stravinsky and Luigi Dallapiccola. Works for the general public include Understanding Music and Introduction to Musical Civilization.

Vlad died, aged 93, in Rome on 21 September 2013.

== Selected filmography ==
- The Monastery of Santa Chiara (1949)
- Tragic Spell (1951)
- I Chose Love (1953)
- The Three Thieves (1954)
- I Vampiri (1957)
- The Son of the Red Corsair (1959)
- The Crossroads (1959)

== Relevant literature ==
- Pasticci, Susanna. "Hermeneutics and Creative Process: Roman Vlad’s Reception of Stravinsky." Archival Notes: Sources and Research from the Institute of Music 2 (2017): 41–63.
