= Ludmilla Dudarova =

20th century Turkish-born Romanian film actress

- Born: Samsun, Turkey
- Occupation: Actress
- Years active: 1949–1970

Ludmilla Dudarova was a Turkish-born Romanian film actress known for her work in Italy.

== Filmography ==
Year	Title	Role	Notes
1949	Fabiola	Giulia	
1949	Black Magic		Uncredited
1949	Prince of Foxes	Vittoria	Uncredited
1950	Father's Dilemma	Signorina Ludovisi	
1951	Il caimano del Piave	Helene	
1951	Song of Spring	Elena	
1951	Licenza premio		
1951	Free Escape	Signora Quaglia	
1952	Lieutenant Giorgio	Cugina di Elisa	
1952	Papà ti ricordo	Daria	
1953	Nero and the Burning of Rome	Valeria Messalina	
1953	La valigia dei sogni	La baronessa Caprioli	
1953	Condannatelo!	Carmela	
1954	A Slice of Life		(segment "Don Corradino")
1954	Il grande addio		
1954	Ulysses	Arete	
1955	Cantami buongiorno tristezza	Diana Printemps	
1970	The Kremlin Letter	Mrs. Potkin	(final film role)

== Bibliography ==
- Verdone, Luca. I film di Alessandro Blasetti. Gremese Editore, 1989.
