= Gianna Maria Canale =

Italian actress (1927–2009)

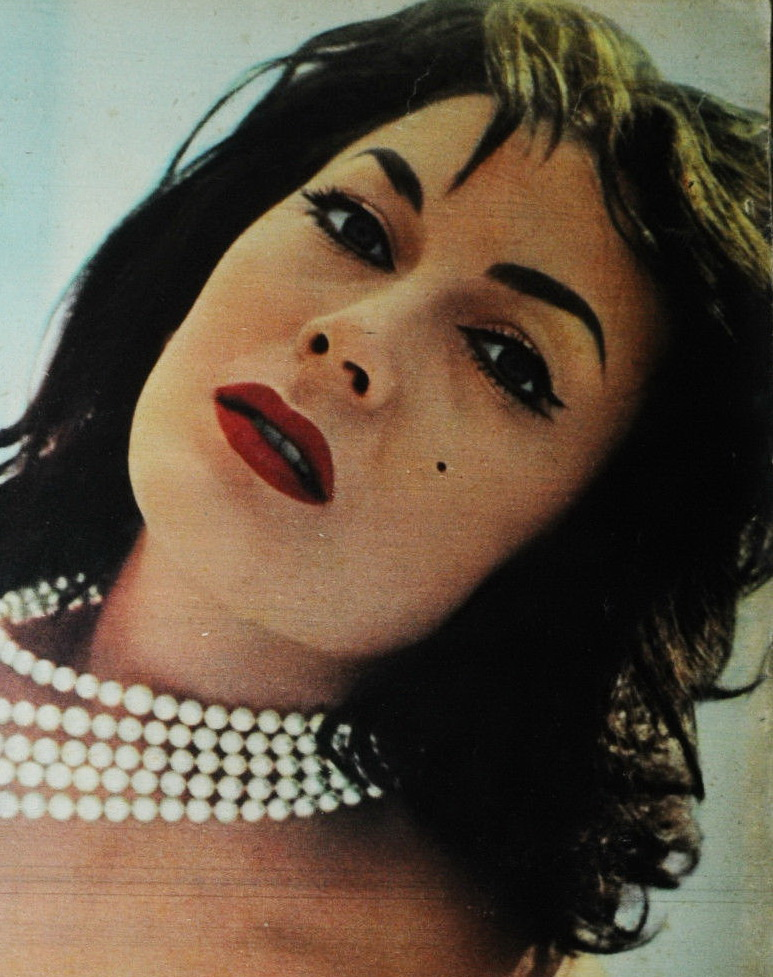
- Canale in 1959
- Born: 12 September 1927; Reggio Calabria, Kingdom of Italy
- Died: 13 February 2009 (aged 81); Sutri, Viterbo, Italy
- Occupation: Actress
- Years active: 1946–1964
- Spouse: Riccardo Freda

Gianna Maria Canale (12 September 1927 – 13 February 2009) was an Italian film actress.

== Biography ==
Canale was born in 1927 in Reggio Calabria. In 1947, she competed in the Miss Italia beauty contest, where she was runner-up to Lucia Bosè. Following this, she appeared in many Italian magazines, with her looks being compared to those of Ava Gardner.

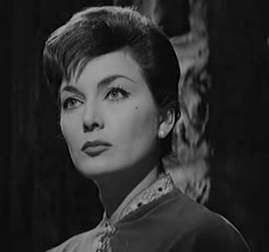
Canale in I vampiri (1956)

Canale was offered a role in a movie by Riccardo Freda, with whom she eventually fell in love. They moved to Brazil where they were married and worked together in two movies. As Canale did not enjoy living in South America, the couple returned to Italy where, often directed by her husband, she starred in many Sword-and-sandal movies, as well as horror and adventure ones. I vampiri was her last film with Freda.

Canale retired from acting in 1964 at the age of 37. She died in Sutri, Viterbo in January 2009.

== Filmography ==
Year	Title	Role	Director	Cast	Notes
1946	Black Eagle		Riccardo Freda	Rossano Brazzi, Irasema Dilián, Gino Cervi	
1946	Rigoletto	Maddalena	Carmine Gallone	Tito Gobbi, Marcella Govoni, Lina Pagliughi	
1948	Il cavaliere misterioso	Countess Lehmann	Riccardo Freda	Vittorio Gassman, María Mercader, Yvonne Sanson	
1948	Guarany	Jacqueline	Riccardo Freda	António Vilar, Mariella Lotti	
1949	Totò Le Mokò	Viviane de Valance	Carlo Ludovico Bragaglia	Totò	
1949	O caçula do Barulho		Riccardo Freda	Oscarito, Grande Otelo	
1949	The Iron Swordsman	Emilia	Riccardo Freda	Carlo Ninchi	
1949	Il bacio di una morta	Nora O'Kira	Guido Brignone	Virginia Belmont	
1950	Son of d'Artagnan	Linda	Riccardo Freda	Carlo Ninchi	
1951	Double Cross	Luisetta	Riccardo Freda	Amedeo Nazzari, Vittorio Gassman	
1951	Go for Broke!	Rosina	Robert Pirosh	Van Johnson	
1951	Revenge of Black Eagle	Tatiana Cernicevskij	Riccardo Freda	Rossano Brazzi	
1951	See Naples and Die	Marisa Meris	Riccardo Freda		
1952	The Eternal Chain	Maria Raneri	Anton Giulio Majano	Marcello Mastroianni	
1952	The Legend of the Piave	Contessa Giovanna Dolfin	Riccardo Freda		
1953	Sins of Rome	Sabina Crassus	Riccardo Freda	Massimo Girotti, Ludmilla Tchérina	
1953	The Man from Cairo	Lorraine Belogne	Ray Enright	George Raft	
1953	Alarm in Morocco	Nathalie Provence	Jean Devaivre	Jean-Claude Pascal, Erich von Stroheim	
1954	Theodora, Slave Empress	Theodora	Riccardo Freda	Georges Marchal	
1954	Madame du Barry	Duchesse de Grammont	Christian-Jaque	Martine Carol	
1954	The Shadow	Elena	Giorgio Bianchi	Märta Torén, Pierre Cressoy	
1954	Madame Butterfly	Singer: Suzuki	Carmine Gallone	Kaoru Yachigusa, Nicola Filacuridi, Michiko Tanaka	
1955	Napoleón	Pauline Bonaparte	Sacha Guitry	Daniel Gélin, Raymond Pellegrin, Orson Welles, Erich von Stroheim, Michèle Morgan, Danielle Darrieux, Yves Montand, Jean Gabin, Jean Marais	
1955	Il coraggio	Susy Esposito	Domenico Paolella	Totò, Gino Cervi	
1956	A Woman Alone	Mara	Vittorio Sala	Eleonora Rossi Drago	
1956	The Lebanese Mission	Countess Athelstane Orloff	Richard Pottier	Jean-Claude Pascal, Omar Sharif, Jean Servais, Juliette Gréco	
1956	Le schiave di Cartagine	Julia Martia	Guido Brignone	Jorge Mistral	
1957	I Vampiri	Giselle du Grand	Riccardo Freda		Film completed by Mario Bava
1958	Pirate of the Half Moon	Infanta Caterina	Giuseppe Maria Scotese	John Derek	
1958	Hercules	Antea	Pietro Francisci	Steve Reeves, Sylva Koscina	
1958	The Silent Enemy	Conchita	William Fairchild	Laurence Harvey, Dawn Addams, Michael Craig	
1958	The Mighty Crusaders	Armida	Carlo Ludovico Bragaglia	Francisco Rabal, Sylva Koscina, Rik Battaglia	
1958	The Whole Truth	Gina Bertini	John Guillermin	Stewart Granger, Donna Reed, George Sanders	
1958	The Warrior and the Slave Girl	Amira	Vittorio Cottafavi	Georges Marchal	
1959	Devil's Cavaliers	Baroness Elaine of Faldone	Siro Marcellini	Frank Latimore	
1960	Seven in the Sun	Libertà	Sergio Bergonzelli	Frank Latimore	
1960	The Night They Killed Rasputin	Czarina Alexandra	Pierre Chenal	Edmund Purdom, John Drew Barrymore	
1960	Queen of the Pirates	Sandra	Mario Costa		
1960	Colossus and the Amazon Queen	Amazon Queen	Vittorio Sala	Rod Taylor, Ed Fury, Dorian Gray	
1960	The Conqueror of the Orient	Dinazar / Zobeida	Tanio Boccia	Rik Battaglia	
1961	The Treasure of Monte Cristo	Lucetta Di Marca	Monty Berman, Robert S. Baker	Rory Calhoun	
1961	Maciste contro il vampiro	Astra	Sergio Corbucci, Giacomo Gentilomo	Gordon Scott, Jacques Sernas	
1961	The Centurion	Artemide	Mario Costa	Jacques Sernas, John Drew Barrymore, Geneviève Grad, Gordon Mitchell	
1962	The Slave	Claudia	Sergio Corbucci	Steve Reeves, Jacques Sernas	
1962	Le Chevalier de Pardaillan	Princess Fausta Borgia	Bernard Borderie	Gérard Barray	
1962	Tiger of the Seven Seas	Consuelo	Luigi Capuano	Anthony Steel	
1963	The Adventures of Scaramouche	Suzanne	Antonio Isasi-Isasmendi	Gérard Barray, Michèle Girardon	
1963	Il Boom	Silvia Alberti	Vittorio De Sica	Alberto Sordi	
1963	The Lion of St. Mark	Rossana	Luigi Capuano	Gordon Scott, Rik Battaglia	
1964	Il treno del sabato	Luisa Mancini	Vittorio Sala		
1964	The Avenger of Venice	Imperia	Carlo Campogalliani, Piero Pierotti	Brett Halsey	(final film role)
