= Special Correspondents (1943 film) =

1943 film

- Directed by: Romolo Marcellini
- Written by: Giuseppe Castelletti; Alberto Consiglio; Ennio Flaiano; Asvero Gravelli; Virginio Lilli; Romolo Marcellini
- Starring: Dorothea Wieck; Otello Toso; Maurizio D'Ancora
- Cinematography: Rodolfo Lombardi
- Edited by: Vincenzo Zampi
- Music by: Mario Ruccione
- Production companies: Consorzio Italiano Film; Littoria Film
- Distributed by: ENIC
- Release date: 27 April 1943
- Running time: 90 minutes
- Country: Italy
- Language: Italian

Special Correspondents (Italian: Inviati speciali) is a 1943 Italian romantic thriller film directed by Romolo Marcellini and starring Dorothea Wieck, Otello Toso and Maurizio D'Ancora. It was produced as a propaganda film in support of the Italian war effort during the Second World War, released a few months before the overthrow of Benito Mussolini's regime.

It was shot at the Farnesina Studios of Titanus in Rome. The film's sets were designed by the art directors Alberto Boccianti and Camillo Del Signore.

== Synopsis ==
During the Spanish Civil War an Italian journalist meets a woman he takes to be a colleague, but is in fact a Communist agent. They encounter each other years later during the North African Campaign, where she has a change of heart and heroically sacrifices herself.

== Cast ==
- Dorothea Wieck as Lidia Warren
- Otello Toso as Renato Marini
- Maurizio D'Ancora as L'operatore Galletti
- Nerio Bernardi as Il maggiore Alessandri
- Mino Doro as Il giornalista Prosperi
- Francesco Grandjacquet as Il commissario Michele Kuncef
- Carlo Duse as L'ufficiale di Stato Maggiore in Africa
- Barbara Ledi as Barbara Wood
- Luigi Pavese as Un colonnello
- Piero Palermini as Il giovane tenente
- Emilio Petacci as Richardson
- Otello Cazzola as De Gariata
- Mario Brizzolari as Il colonnello Garcia
- Maria Teresa Le Beau as L'informatrice
- Rita Livesi as La direttrice dell' hotel a Biarritz
- Paolo Ferrara as Baldassare
- Adele Garavaglia as La signora del telegrafo
- Saro Urzì as Un soldato

== Bibliography ==
- Trubiano, Marisa S. Ennio Flaiano and His Italy: Postcards from a Changing World. Fairleigh Dickinson Univ Press, 2010.
