= The Legend of the Piave (film) =

1952 film

- Directed by: Riccardo Freda
- Written by: Riccardo Freda; Giuseppe Mangione
- Produced by: Manlio Morelli
- Starring: Gianna Maria Canale; Carlo Giustini; Renato Baldini
- Cinematography: Sergio Pesce
- Edited by: Mario Serandrei
- Music by: Carlo Rustichelli
- Production company: Produzione Film Colamonici Tupini
- Distributed by: Indipendenti Regionali
- Release date: 1952
- Running time: 95 minutes
- Country: Italy
- Language: Italian

The Legend of the Piave (Italian: La leggenda del piave) is a 1952 Italian war melodrama film directed by Riccardo Freda and starring Gianna Maria Canale, Carlo Giustini and Renato Baldini. It takes its name from the 1918 patriotic song of the same name, although there is little connection between the song's lyrics and the plot of the film. It was filmed over four weeks, mostly at the Titanus Studios in Rome. The film's sets were designed by the art director Alfredo Montori.

== Synopsis ==
During the First World War, countess Giovanna Dolfin discovers that her husband the count is in fact an opportunist who has only enlisted in the Italian Army in order to carry out black market activities. She plans to leave him but he ultimately redeems himself following the disastrous Battle of Caporetto and the subsequent fighting on the Piave River, where he is badly wounded.

== Cast ==
- Gianna Maria Canale as Contessa Giovanna Dolfin
- Carlo Giustini as Conte Riccardo Dolfin
- Renato Baldini as Don Carlo, capellano
- Edoardo Toniolo as Ufficiale Austriaco
- Enrico Viarisio as Caporale Mainardi
- Duccio Sissia as Piccolo Mario, figlio dei conti Dolfin
- Giorgio Consolini as Soldato Cantante
- Luigi De Filippo as Giorgio, un soldato
- Elena Cotta as Gabriella
- Marina Recchia as Contadina

== Bibliography ==
- Curti, Roberto. Riccardo Freda: The Life and Works of a Born Filmmaker. McFarland, 2017.
