= Nora Orlandi =

Italian musician and composer (1933–2025)

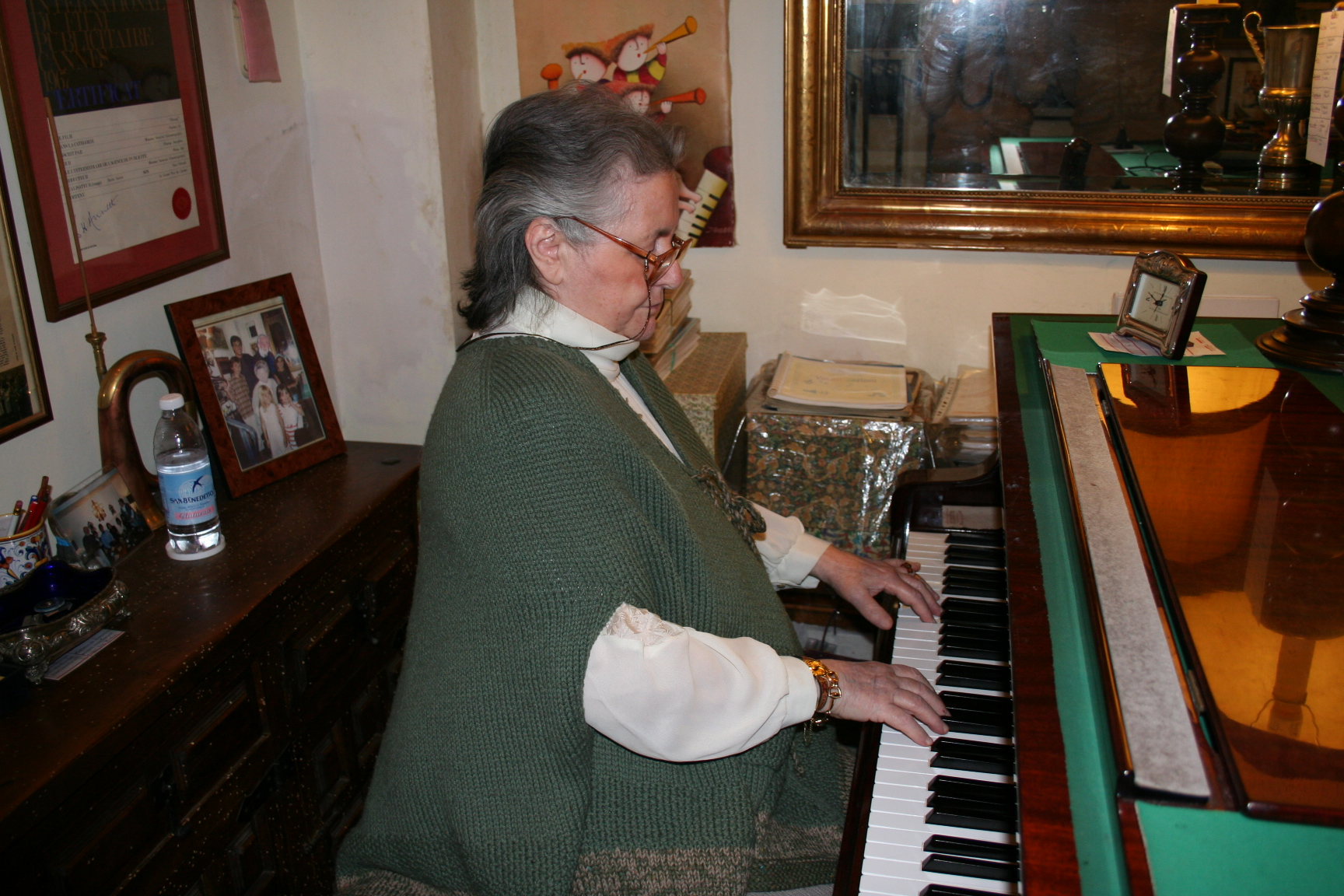
- Orlandi in 2008

Background information
- Born: 28 June 1933; Voghera, Italy
- Died: 1 January 2025 (aged 91) Rome, Italy
- Genres: Film music; easy listening; lounge music
- Occupations: Singer; pianist; composer

Nora Orlandi (28 June 1933 – 1 January 2025), also known as Joan Christian, was an Italian pianist, violinist, soprano vocalist, composer, and occasional actress.

== Career ==
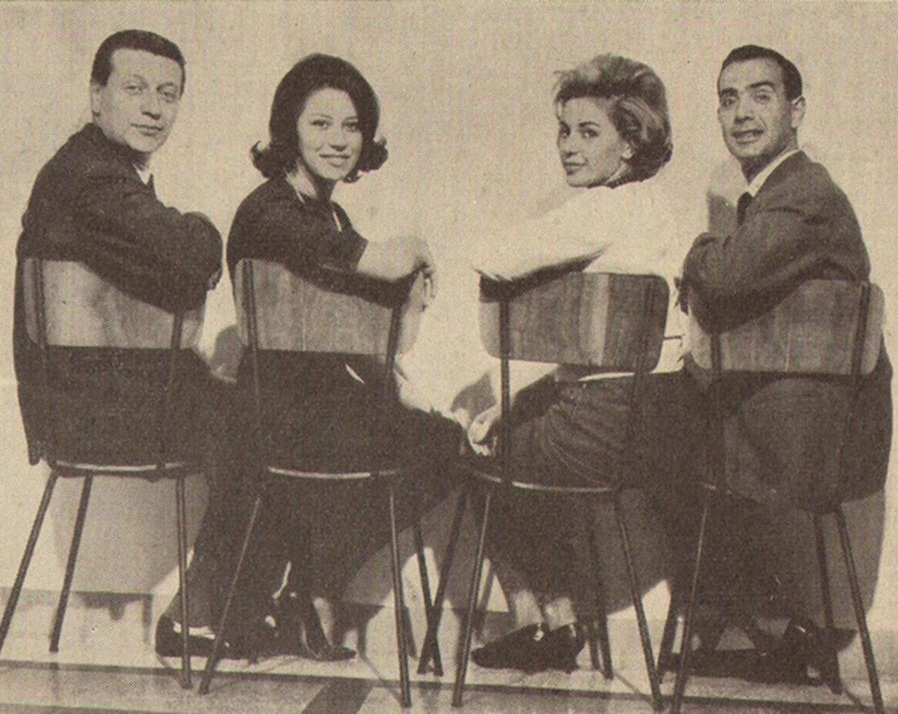
Nora Orlandi's first vocal group "Quartetto 2 + 2" c. 1954, L-R: Massimo Cini, Paola Orlandi, Nora Orlandi and Marcello Fabrizi

Orlandi was the founder of I 4+4 di Nora Orlandi, a vocal ensamble active on television, radio and films, and that collaborated as chorus with notable artists such as Adriano Celentano, Mina, Gianni Morandi, Lucio Battisti, Lucio Dalla, Domenico Modugno, Mia Martini and Gino Paoli. The group, with Orlandi performing wordless vocals, performed on many film scores by composers such as Stelvio Cipriani, Carlo Savina, Piero Piccioni, Armando Trovajoli, Fred Bongusto and Piero Umiliani. As the first female film composer of Italian cinema, she composed scores for Spaghetti Westerns, Eurospy films and gialli throughout the 1960s and was best known for "Dies Irae", a short piece she wrote and performed for Sergio Martino's The Strange Vice of Mrs Wardh (1971) which was later reused in Quentin Tarantino's Kill Bill: Volume 2 (2004).

== Personal life and death ==
Orlandi died from cardiac arrest in Rome on 1 January 2025, at the age of 91.

Her younger sister was the singer-songwriter Paola Orlandi, who died less than two months after Nora on 25 February 2025.

== Select filmography ==
- Johnny Yuma (1966)
- Clint the Stranger (1967)
- Ten Thousand Dollars for a Massacre (1967)
- Death at Owell Rock (1967)
- Vengeance Is Mine (1967)
- The Sweet Body of Deborah (1968)
- Double Face (1969)
- The Strange Vice of Mrs Wardh (1971)
