= Harriet White Medin =

American actress

- Born: Harriet White; March 14, 1914; Somerville, Massachusetts
- Died: May 20, 2005 (aged 91); Los Angeles, California
- Occupation(s): Actress, dialogue coach
- Years active: 1946–1996
- Spouse: Gastone Medin

Harriet White Medin (March 14, 1914 – May 20, 2005), also credited as Harriet White, Harriet Medin or Rietta Medin, was an American actress and dialogue coach who worked in Italian and American films. She made her film debut in Roberto Rossellini's Paisan (1946), went on to play supporting roles in Italian films and later appeared in Death Race 2000 (1975), a cult film produced by Roger Corman.

== Early life ==
Born to Dr. and Mrs. Edward P. White of Winthrop, Massachusetts, as one of five children, Harriet graduated from Winthrop High School – where she appeared in many school plays – in 1932. She later performed in many amateur theatrical productions in the area. She graduated from The Forsyth Institute where she studied dentistry, and worked for five years as a dental assistant where some of her patients included John F. Kennedy and Robert F. Kennedy.

== Career ==
Harriet moved to New York City to engage in work as an actress. During World War II she became an entertainer with the United Service Organizations where she toured American military bases in the US and Europe as part of a production of Junior Miss.

Following the war, she was one of a group of American actors recruited by Rod E. Geiger to go to Italy to film Paisan under Roberto Rossellini (where she also met the film's dialogue coach Federico Fellini). She remained in Italy to become one of the first American actresses to work in Italian films in the postwar era.

While living in Italy, she appeared in films, acted as a dialogue coach, dubbed films into English, and worked as a coach and personal assistant to Gina Lollobrigida.

She met Orson Welles on the set of Prince of Foxes (1949), with Welles hiring her to teach diction to the actress Lea Padovani whom Welles wished to play Desdemona in his ongoing production of Othello (released in 1951). Harriet was originally to have played Emilia but the lengthy time of production led her to drop out.

During this time she met and married her husband Gastone Medin and remained with him until they separated, but not divorced in 1964. In addition to dubbing Italian films in English, Harriet also acted as a dialogue coach, and cast such films as Beat the Devil (1954) and The Hills Run Red (1966) as well as acting as a film extra. Harriet's last film in Italy was John Huston's Reflections in a Golden Eye (1967); she accompanied Gina Lollobrigida to America to coach her on The Private Navy of Sgt. O'Farrell (1968).

She stayed in Hollywood with her friend director Andrew Marton and his wife, where she guest-starred in several American television series and made several films. One was for John Landis (Schlock) whom she knew through the Martons. She believed she obtained her role in Death Race 2000 – with Harriet doing an impression of Eleanor Roosevelt – when Shelley Winters turned the film down.

== Death ==
She died on May 20, 2005, of "natural causes", including a combination of Parkinson's disease, a mild stroke, some internal bleeding and other illnesses.

== Filmography ==
- Paisan (1946) - Harriet - Nurse (episode IV: Firenze)
- Genoveffa di Brabante (1947) - Genoveffa di Brabante
- Black Magic (1949)
- Rapture (1950) - Nurse
- Quo Vadis (1951) - Woman holding infant on balcony (uncredited)
- Ha da venì... don Calogero (1952)
- La Dolce Vita (1960) - Sylvia's Secretary (uncredited)
- The Horrible Dr. Hichcock (1962) - Martha, the Maid
- Panic Button (1962, released in 1964)
- The Eye of the Needle (1963) - Mother of Rosaria
- The Ghost (1963) - Catherine Wood, Housekeeper
- Black Sabbath (1963) - Neighbor (segment "La goccia d'acqua")
- The Cardinal (1963) - (uncredited)
- The Whip and the Body (1963) - Giorgia
- Hot Enough for June (1964) - Hotel Receptionist (uncredited)
- Blood and Black Lace (1964) - Clarissa
- The Murder Clinic (1966) - Sheena
- Your Turn to Die (1967) - Dr. Evans' assistant
- Death of a Gunfighter (1969)
- Squares (1972) - Hannah Rugh
- Schlock (1973) - Mrs. Blinerman (as Enrica Blankey)
- Death Race 2000 (1975) - Thomasina Paine
- The Captive: The Longest Drive 2 (1976) - Mrs. McMasters
- The Bermuda Triangle (1979, documentary) - Frau Meise
- The Tenth Month (1979, TV movie) - Mrs. Cox the Lawyer
- Murder Can Hurt You! (1980, TV movie) - Great Lady
- Blood Beach (1981) - Ruth Hutton
- The Terminator (1984) - Customer #4
- The Witches of Eastwick (1987) - Woman at Market
- Big Bad Mama II (1987) - Hotel manager's wife
- The Killing Time (1987) - Nell
- Daddy's Boys (1988) - Marriage Licensor's Wife
- False Arrest (1991, TV movie) - Helen Phelps
- All I Want for Christmas (1991) - Mrs. Graff
- Those Secrets (1992, TV movie) - Vivian
- Troublemakers (1994) - Elderly woman
- Things to Do in Denver When You're Dead (1995) - Old Woman
