= Love in Rome =

- Directed by: Dino Risi
- Written by: Ercole Patti; Ennio Flaiano
- Produced by: Mario Cecchi Gori
- Cinematography: Mario Montuori
- Music by: Carlo Rustichelli
- Release date: 1960
- Country: Italy
- Language: Italian

Un amore a Roma (internationally released as Love in Rome) is a 1960 Italian romantic drama film directed by Dino Risi.

== Plot ==
Marcello (Baldwin), a young writer, loves Anna (Demongeot), a femme fatale-ish beauty who can't remain faithful to any man for very long. Anna has her sights set on a movie career. However, she only seems to be able to secure parts in low-brow peplum films.

Marcello is frustrated by Anna's capricious nature, while he himself is involved with two other women, Fulvia (Martinelli) and Eleonora (Perschy). At one point, Marcello even proposes to Eleonora but is unable to follow it through.

== Cast ==
- Mylène Demongeot: Anna Padoan
- Peter Baldwin: Marcello Cenni
- Elsa Martinelli: Fulvia
- Claudio Gora: Eng. Curtatoni
- Maria Perschy: Eleonora Curtatoni
- Jacques Sernas: Tony Meneghini
- Armando Romeo: Nello D'Amore
- Umberto Orsini: Peppino Barlacchi
- Fanfulla: Moreno
- Vittorio De Sica: the director
- Enrico Glori
