= The Gay Swordsman =

- French film poster
- Directed by: Riccardo Freda
- Screenplay by: Riccardo Freda
- Story by: Riccardo Freda
- Produced by: Raffaele Colamonici; Umberto Montesi
- Starring: Gianna Maria Canale; Francesca Marsi; Piero Palermini; Carlo Ninchi
- Cinematography: Sergio Pesce
- Edited by: Renato Cinquini
- Music by: Carlo Jachino
- Production company: Augustus Film
- Distributed by: August Film (Italy)
- Release date: 8 March 1950 (Italy)
- Running time: 86 minutes^{a}
- Country: Italy

The Gay Swordsman (Italian: Il figlio di d'Artagnan) is a 1950 Italian historical adventure film directed by Riccardo Freda and starring Carlo Ninchi, Gianna Maria Canale and Franca Marzi.

== Synopsis ==
The son of d'Artagnan, the hero of The Three Musketeers, does not wish to follow in his father's footsteps and retires to a monastery. However, when a crime is committed in front of him he feels compelled to become involved. Here he meets the Duke of Bligny and Linda, a pastry chef, with whom he falls in love. Raoul offers to track down and have the mysterious knight punished; but he tries to have him killed without result and so he is accused of having stolen the plan of operations against the Flemings to have him sentenced to death. Raoul will blow up the enemy fortress that blocks the way of the troops and entering the fortress with the Duke Bligny discovers that the mysterious knight is a duke, military adviser to his father.

== Cast ==
- Carlo Ninchi as Marshall D'Artagnan
- Gianna Maria Canale as Linda
- Franca Marzi as the Contessa
- Peter Trent as Duke de Malvoisin
- Paolo Stoppa as Paolo
- Piero Palermini as Raoul D'Artagnan
- Enzo Fiermonte as Viscount di Langlass

== Release ==
The Gay Swordsman was distributed theatrically in Italy by August Film on March 8, 1950. The film grossed a total of 201,000,000 Italian lire domestically.

The film was picked up for distribution overseas, with an article in the Los Angeles Times from November 1950 stating that Sol Lesser's company Principal Pictures International was going to import the film under the title of The Son of D'Artagnan.The film was only released in late 1953 in the United States on the bottom end of double bills with the title The Gay Swordsman.

== Notes ==
- ^{a}Official ministry papers list the running time of the film as 102 minutes. Curti has described this as "highly unlikely", and stated the copy available at the Spanish filmoteca ran at 86 minutes and had no signs of cuts.
