= The Mysterious Rider (1948 film) =

1948 Italian historical-adventure film by Riccardo Freda

- Directed by: Riccardo Freda
- Screenplay by: Riccardo Freda; Mario Monicelli; Stefano Vanzina
- Story by: Riccardo Freda; Mario Monicelli; Stefano Vanzina
- Produced by: Dino De Laurentiis
- Starring: Vittorio Gassman; María Mercader; Yvonne Sanson; Gianna Maria Canale
- Cinematography: Rodolfo Lombardi
- Edited by: Otello Colangeli
- Music by: Alessandro Cicognini
- Production company: Lux Film
- Distributed by: Lux Film
- Release date: 1 November 1948 (Italy)
- Running time: 92 minutes
- Country: Italy

The Mysterious Rider (Italian: Il cavaliere misterioso, lit. 'The Mysterious Cavalier') is a 1948 Italian historical-adventure film directed by Riccardo Freda.

== Cast ==
- Vittorio Gassman as Giacomo Casanova, Cavalier of Seingalt
- María Mercader as Elisabetta
- Yvonne Sanson as Catherine II
- Gianna Maria Canale as Countess Lehmann
- Alessandra Mamis as Countess Paola Ipatieff
- Hans Hinrich as the Grand Inquisitor
- Dante Maggio as Gennaro
- Guido Notari as Count Ipatieff
- Vittorio Duse as Ivan
- Elli Parvo as Dogaressa
- Antonio Centa as Baron Porsky
- Tino Buazzelli as Joseph

== Release ==
The Mysterious Rider was distributed theatrically by Lux Film in Italy on 1 November 1948. It grossed a total of 180,000,000 Italian lire domestically in Italy. In 2005 the film was restored and shown as part of the retrospective "Casanova on the screen" at the 62nd Venice International Film Festival.
