= The Iron Swordsman =

- Directed by: Riccardo Freda
- Screenplay by: Stefano Vanzina; Mario Monicelli; Riccardo Freda
- Story by: Luigi Bonelli
- Cinematography: Sergio Pesce
- Edited by: Roberto Cinquini
- Music by: Alessandro Cicognini
- Production company: Forum Film
- Distributed by: Forum Film
- Release date: 1 November 1949 (Italy)
- Running time: 88 minutes
- Country: Italy
- Box office: ₤87 million

The Iron Swordsman (Italian: Il conte Ugolino) is a 1949 Italian historical drama film directed by Riccardo Freda and starring Carlo Ninchi and Gianna Maria Canale. It is loosely based on real life events of Ugolino della Gherardesca.

== Plot ==
Ugolino della Gherardesca, a gentleman of character but also inclined to sentimental adventures, is disliked by the other powerful Pisan families. Cardinal Ruggieri, who pretends to be his friend, plots a plot against him: held responsible for the defeat of the Meloria against the Republic of Genoa, Ugolino is walled up alive with his sons. Despite being able to unmask the plot, the daughter is unable to avoid the gruesome fate of her relatives.

== Cast ==
- Carlo Ninchi as Count Ugolino della Gherardesca
- Gianna Maria Canale as Emilia
- Peter Trent as Cardinal Ruggieri
- Piero Palermini as Balduccio
- Carla Calò as Haidée
- Luigi Pavese as Sismondi
- Ugo Sasso as Fortebraccio

== Release ==
The Iron Swordsman was released in Italy on November 1, 1949 where it was distributed by Forum Film. It grossed a total of £87 million lire domestically.
