= Sins of Rome =

- Directed by: Riccardo Freda
- Screenplay by: Jean Ferrey; Maria Bory; Gino Visentini
- Story by: Maria Bory
- Produced by: Carlo Caiano
- Starring: Massimo Girotti; Ludmilla Tchérina; Gianna Maria Canale; Yves Vincent
- Cinematography: Gábor Pogány; Mario Bava
- Edited by: Mario Serandrei
- Music by: Renzo Rossellini
- Production companies: A.P.I. Film; Consorzio Spartacus Film; Es Establissments Sinag; Rialto Film
- Distributed by: A.P.I. (Italy)
- Release date: 28 January 1953 (Italy)
- Running time: 105 minutes
- Countries: Italy; France
- Language: Italian
- Box office: 450 million lire

Sins of Rome (Italian: Spartaco) is a 1953 historical drama film directed by Riccardo Freda and loosely based on the life story of Spartacus. The rights of film's negatives and copies were bought by the producers of Stanley Kubrick's 1960 film Spartacus, as to prevent eventual new releases of the film that could have damaged the commercial outcome of Kubrick’s film; this resulted in Sins of Rome's withdrawal from market for about thirty years.

== Plot summary ==
In 74 B.C., Spartacus, a Roman soldier of Thracian origins, is enslaved by Crassus after coming to the rescue of the beautiful slave Amytis. Enlisted into Lentulus's gladiators, he attempts repeatedly to escape. When the gladiators begin a revolt, Spartacus becomes their leader and leaves Rome with them. Wounded by Rufus's soldiers during a patrol, he takes refuge with Crassus's young daughter Sabina, who has fallen in love with him. After recovering, Spartacus returns to his men and leads them in a victorious assault on Rufus's fortified camp. The unexpected defeat alarms the senate; Crassus summons Spartacus and promises freedom for him and his followers. Meanwhile, the rebels, unsettled in the absence of their leader, decide to attack the Roman troops. Spartacus joins them and dies in battle, which turns into carnage for the slaves.

== Cast ==
- Massimo Girotti as Spartacus
- Ludmilla Tchérina as Amitys
- Gianna Maria Canale as Sabina
- Yves Vincent as Ocnomas
- Carlo Ninchi as Marcus Licinius Crassus
- Carlo Giustini as Artorige
- Teresa Franchini as Spartacus's mother
- Vittorio Sanipoli as Marcus Virilius Rufus
- Umberto Silvestri as Lentulus
- Renato Baldini as Gladiator
- Nerio Bernardi
- Cesare Bettarini

== Release ==
Sins of Rome was distributed in Italy as Spartaco by A.P.I. on January 28, 1953. The film grossed a total of 450 million Italian lire in Italy. The film was released in the United States as Sins of Rome and in the United Kingdom as Spartacus the Gladiator.

== Sources ==
- Curti, Roberto (2017). Riccardo Freda: The Life and Works of a Born Filmmaker. Jefferson, North Carolina: McFarland.
