= Sergio Pesce =

Italian cinematographer (1916–1995)

- Born: 3 June 1916; Naples, Italy
- Died: 1 December 1995 (aged 79); Rome, Italy
- Occupation: Cinematographer
- Years active: 1941–1975

Sergio Pesce (3 June 1916 – 1 December 1995) was an Italian cinematographer.

== Selected filmography ==
- The Lion of Damascus (1942)
- Macario Against Zagomar (1944)
- The Ten Commandments (1945)
- The Iron Swordsman (1949)
- Twenty Years (1949)
- Son of d'Artagnan (1950)
- The Transporter (1950)
- Free Escape (1951)
- The Legend of the Piave (1952)
- Love Song (1954)
- The Mysteries of Paris (1957)
- La sceriffa (1959)

== Bibliography ==
- Gary Allen Smith. Epic Films: Casts, Credits and Commentary on More Than 350 Spectacle Movies. McFarland, 2004.
