= Il caimano del Piave =

Il Caimano del Piave
- Directed by: Giorgio Bianchi
- Cinematography: Mario Craveri
- Music by: Enzo Masetti
- Distributed by: Variety Distribution
- Release date: 1951
- Country: Italy
- Language: Italian

Il Caimano del Piave is a 1951 Italian war-melodrama film directed by Giorgio Bianchi.

== Plot ==
After completing her studies, Lucilla di Torrebruna returns to San Donà di Piave where her father, a cavalry colonel, is about to marry Helène in a second marriage. Seeing her father happy with her the girl bears the hostility of her stepmother. The First World War breaks out and Franco, a fellow student of Lucilla, leaves Trieste to enter Italian territory to enlist in the Bersaglieri but due to the defeat of Caporetto the Austrians occupy the town of San Donà and the Torrebruna villa becomes the headquarters of the command military and Helène reveals that she is a pro-Austrian spy.

The colonel and Franco, who has become an officer of the Arditi, organize a network of espionage in favor of the Italians and during one of these raids the colonel is wounded and it is Lucilla who takes his place. She is captured and sentenced to death, but the cavalry led by Franco manages to save her at the last minute.

== Cast ==
- Gino Cervi as Il colonnello di Torrebruna
- Milly Vitale as Lucilla di Torrebruna
- Frank Latimore as Franco
- Francesco Golisano as Il contadino Ciampin Zoppo (as Geppa)
- Harry Feist as Ufficiale austriaco
- Carlo Croccolo as Esposito
- Ludmilla Dudarova as Helene
- Gianni Musy as Goffredo (as Gianni Glori)
- Fausto Tozzi
