= The Night They Killed Rasputin =

- French film poster
- French: Les nuits de Raspoutine
- Directed by: Pierre Chenal
- Written by: Pierre Chenal; Ugo Liberatore; André Tabet
- Produced by: Robert de Nesle; Giampaolo Bigazzi
- Starring: Edmund Purdom; Gianna Maria Canale; John Drew Barrymore
- Cinematography: Bitto Albertini
- Edited by: Eraldo Da Roma; Antonietta Zita
- Music by: Angelo Francesco Lavagnino
- Production company: CFPC; Explorer Film '58; Faro Film
- Distributed by: Cino del Duca (Italy)
- Release dates: 12 June 1960 (Italy); 29 July 1960 (France)
- Running time: 87 minutes
- Countries: France; Italy

The Night They Killed Rasputin (French: Les nuits de Raspoutine, lit. 'The Nights of Rasputin') is a 1960 historical adventure film based on the life of Grigori Rasputin. It is co-written and directed by Pierre Chenal, and stars Edmund Purdom, Gianna Maria Canale and John Drew Barrymore.

== Cast ==
- Edmund Purdom as Grigori Rasputin
- Gianna Maria Canale as Tsarina Alexandra
- John Drew Barrymore as Prince Felix Yusupov
- Jany Clair as Irina Yusupova
- Ugo Sasso as Tsar Nicholas
- Yvette Lebon as Gousseva
- Elida Dey as Tania Selevska
- Giulia Rubini as Vera Corali
- Livio Lorenzon as Belesky
- Nerio Bernardi as Commissar
- Miranda Campa as Maria
- Marco Guglielmi as Dr. Stanislas de Lazovert
- Maria Grazia Buccella as Yusupov's Lover
- Feodor Chaliapin Jr. as Pope Benedict XV
- Jole Fierro
- Ivo Garrani
- Enrico Glori
- Michele Malaspina
