= Ciro Berardi =

Italian actor (1909–1961)

- Born: 11 May 1909; Fano, Marche, Kingdom of Italy
- Died: 25 November 1961 (aged 52); Fano, Marche, Italy
- Other name: Giuseppe Spadaro
- Occupation: Actor
- Years active: 1939–1952 (film)

Ciro Berardi (1909–1961) was an Italian actor.

== Selected filmography ==
- Light in the Darkness (1941)
- Lucky Night (1941)
- Street of the Five Moons (1942)
- After Casanova's Fashion (1942)
- Love Story (1942)
- The Peddler and the Lady (1943)
- A Living Statue (1943)
- The Ten Commandments (1945)
- Romulus and the Sabines (1945)
- The Opium Den (1947)
- The Street Has Many Dreams (1948)
- Night Taxi (1950)
- The Beggar's Daughter (1950)
- Free Escape (1951)
- Stasera sciopero (1951)
- Cops and Robbers (1951)

== Bibliography ==
- Ennio Bìspuri. Totò: principe clown : tutti i film di Totò. Guida Editori, 1997.
