= Revenge of Black Eagle =

- Spanish film poster
- Directed by: Riccardo Freda
- Screenplay by: Riccardo Freda; Ennio De Concini; Sandro Continenza
- Story by: Riccardo Freda; Ennio De Concini; Sandro Continenza
- Produced by: Umberto Momi; Carlo Caiano
- Starring: Rossano Brazzi; Gianna Maria Canale; Vittorio Sanipoli
- Cinematography: Tony Frenguelli
- Edited by: Otello Colangeli
- Music by: Renzo Rossellini
- Production company: A.P.I. Film
- Distributed by: A.P.I.
- Release date: 25 October 1951 (Italy)
- Running time: 106 minutes
- Country: Italy
- Box office: ₤368.15 million

Revenge of Black Eagle (Italian: La Vendetta di Aquila Nera, released in UK as Revenge of the Black Eagle) is a 1951 Italian adventure film directed by Riccardo Freda. It is a sequel to Freda's 1946 film Black Eagle, which is based on the novel Dubrovsky by Alexander Pushkin.

== Cast ==
- Rossano Brazzi as Vladimir Dubrovskij
- Gianna Maria Canale as Tatiana Cernicevskij
- Nerio Bernardi as the Zar
- Franca Marzi as Katia
- Vittorio Sanipoli as Prince Boris Yuravleff

== Release ==
Revenge of Black Eagle was released in Italy on October 25, 1951 where it was distributed by Associati Produttori Indipendenti (A.P.I.). It grossed a total of 368.15 million Italian lire domestically. The film was released as Revenge of the Black Eagle in the United Kingdom and The Vengeance of the Black Eagle in the United States.
