= Guarany (film) =

- Directed by: Riccardo Freda
- Screenplay by: Riccardo Freda; Goffredo D'Andrea
- Story by: Riccardo Freda
- Produced by: Salvo D'Angelo
- Starring: António Vilar; Mariella Lotti; Gianna Maria Canale
- Cinematography: Rodolfo Lombardi
- Edited by: Riccardo Freda
- Music by: Antônio Carlos Gomes
- Production company: Universalia Film
- Distributed by: Universalia Film
- Release date: 3 January 1950 (Italy)
- Running time: 87 minutes
- Country: Italy

Guarany is a 1950 Italian film directed by Riccardo Freda and starring António Vilar, Mariella Lotti and Gianna Maria Canale.

== Cast ==
- António Vilar as Carlos Gomez
- Mariella Lotti as Lindita
- Gianna Maria Canale as Jacqueline
- Luigi Pavese as Papà Gomez
- Anita Vargas as Mamma Gomez that
- Andrea Forte as Carlos Gomez bambino
- Dante Maggio as Rossi
- Petr Sharov as Pietro Sharoff

== Production ==
In this period of Italian film history, the opera film was popular as audiences were desiring biopics of Italy's most famous composers. Italian film historian and critic Roberto Curti commented that "the lives of Verdi, Rossini, and Bellini offered not only entertainment, but also a reminder of the country's past glory as a popular antidote to the misery and squalor unearthed by Neorealism." Director Riccardo Freda was set-up with the subject of Antônio Carlos Gomes, a Brazilian composer who was popular in Italy. His best known work was the opera Il Guarany, based on the novel by Jose de Alencar.

The film was a production by Universalia Film, a Catholic-oriented production company started in 1946. According to Piero Regnoli, who was the company's vice artistic manager at the time, Universalia had "about one billion lire at disposal-cash. It was the biggest production company [in Italy]." Freda was friends with Salvo D'Angelo who was high up in the Universalia Film company, and stated he asked for a large sum of money to develop the film as he was uninterested in developing it, but was surprised when it was granted.

Filming began on June 11, 1948 in Rome and after one week, the crew moved to Brazil to shoot on location there.

== Release and reception ==
Guarany was submitted to the Italian board of censors in November 1949. 'Guarany was distributed theatrically in Italy by Universalia Film on 3 January 1950. The film grossed a total of 8,750,000 Italian lire domestically, which Curti described as being "virtually ignored by the public" and being panned by critics on its release. The film was popular in South America, where it earned Universallia and Gianna Maria Canale a lot of press.

Curti stated in 2017 that Guarany was unavailable in any form, not even at Rome's Cineteca Nazionale. A copy of the 303 page script remains.
