= Riccardo Freda =

Italian film director

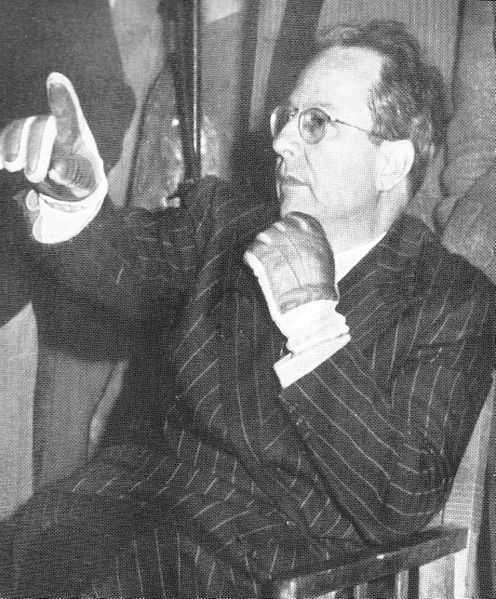
- Riccardo Freda on the set of I Vampiri
- Born: 24 February 1909; Alexandria, Egypt
- Died: 20 December 1999 (aged 90); Rome, Italy
- Spouse: Gianna Maria Canale

Signature
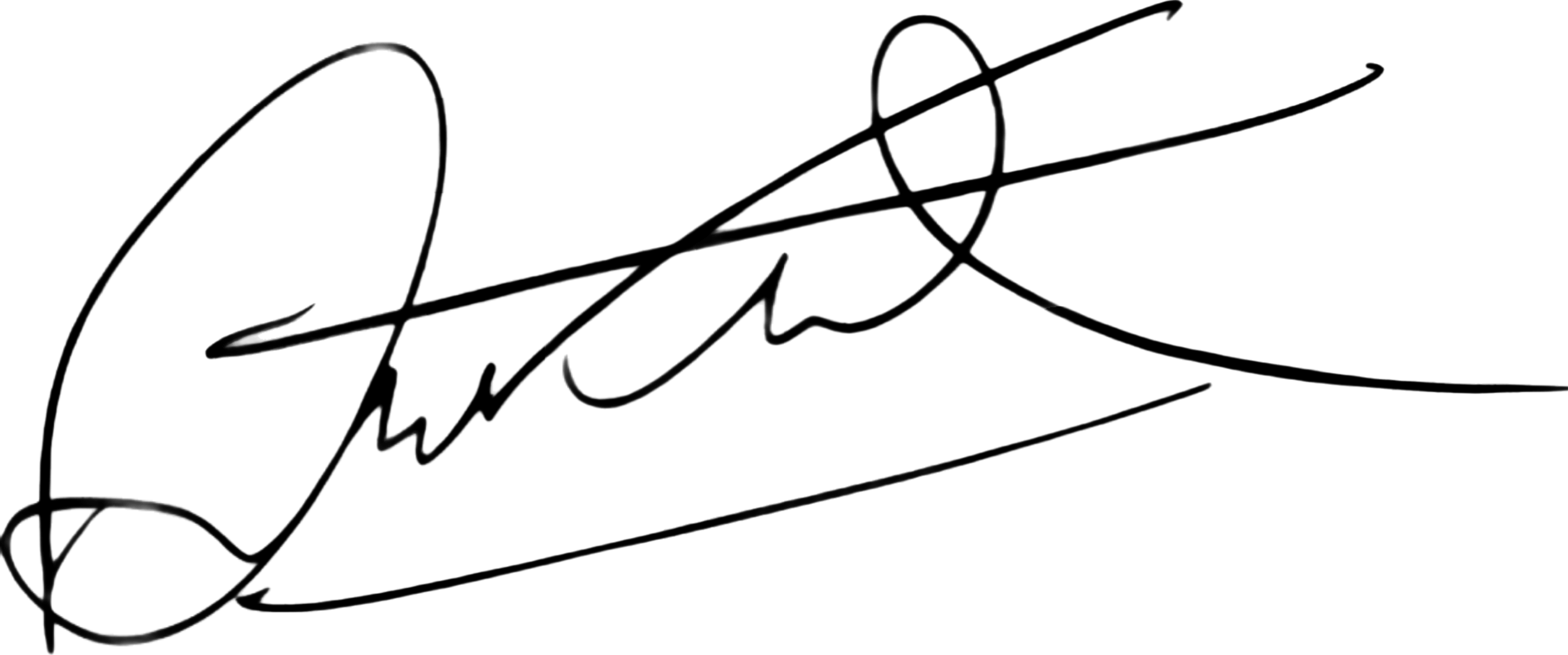

Riccardo Freda (24 February 1909 – 20 December 1999) was an Italian film director. He worked in a variety of genres, including sword-and-sandal, horror, giallo and spy films.

Freda began directing I Vampiri in 1956. The film became the first Italian sound horror film production.

== Biography ==
Riccardo Freda was born in 1909 in Alexandria, Egypt to Italian parents. Freda attended school in Milan where he took art classes at the Centro Sperimantale. After school he took on work as a sculptor and art critic.

=== Film career ===
Freda first began working in the film industry in 1937 and directed his first film Don Cesare di Bazan in 1942. Freda began directing I Vampiri. I Vampiri was the first Italian horror film of the sound era, following the lone silent horror film Il mostro di Frankenstein (1920) A wave of Italian horror productions did not follow until Mario Bava's film Black Sunday was released internationally.

Freda died on 20 December 1999 in Rome.

== Filmography ==
Title	Year	Credited as				Notes	Ref(s)
Title	Year	Director	Writer	Editor	Other	Notes	Ref(s)
Lasciate ogni speranza	1937		Yes				
L'allegro cantante	1938		Yes				
Fuochi d'artificio	1938		Yes				
La voce senza volto	1939		Yes				
Piccoli naufraghi	1939		Yes		Yes	Assistant director	
Il cavaliere di San Marco	1939		Yes				
In the Country Fell a Star	1939		Yes		Yes	Collaborator to direction	
Fascino	1940			Yes			
Il barone di Corbò	1940		Yes				
La granduchessa si diverte	1940		Yes				
Cento lettere d'amore	1940		Yes				
Lucky Night	1941		Yes				
Caravaggio, il pittore maledetto	1941		Yes		Yes	Collaboration to the making	
L'avventuriera del piano di sopra	1941		Yes^{a}	Yes			
Don Cesare di Bazan	1942	Yes	Yes		Yes	Producer	
L'abito nero da sposa	1945		Yes				
Non canto più	1945	Yes	Yes				
Tutta la città canta	1945	Yes	Yes	Yes		Story	
07... Tassì	1945	Yes		Yes			
The Black Eagle	1946	Yes	Yes		Yes	Story	
Les Misérables	1948	Yes	Yes				
The Mysterious Rider	1948	Yes	Yes		Yes	Story	
O caçula do barulho	1949	Yes	Yes		Yes	Story	
The Iron Swordsman	1949	Yes	Yes				
Guarany	1950	Yes	Yes	Yes		Story	
The Gay Swordsman	1950	Yes	Yes		Yes	Story	
L'astuto barone	1950	Yes	Yes			Short film	
Magia a prezzi modici	1951	Yes				Short film	
Double Cross	1951	Yes	Yes				
Tenori per forza	1951	Yes	Yes			Short film	
Revenge of Black Eagle	1951	Yes	Yes		Yes	Story	
See Naples and Die	1952	Yes					
La Leggenda del Piave	1952	Yes	Yes				
Sins of Rome	1953	Yes					
Theodora, Slave Empress	1954	Yes	Yes		Yes	Story, general manager	
I mosaici di Ravenna	1954	Yes		Yes			
Da qui all'eredità	1955	Yes	Yes				
Beatrice Cenci	1956	Yes		Yes		Story	
I Vampiri	1957	Yes	Yes		Yes	Actor (Autopsy doctor)	
Trapped in Tangiers	1957	Yes	Yes		Yes	Story	
Sheba and the Gladiator	1959				Yes	2nd unit director–battle scenes	
The White Warrior	1959	Yes	Yes	Yes			
Caltiki – The Immortal Monster	1959	Yes	Yes				
The Giants of Thessaly	1960	Yes	Yes				
The Mongols	1961				Yes	Director–battle scenes	
Samson and the Seven Miracles of the World	1961	Yes					
Caccia all'uomo	1961	Yes					
Marco Polo	1962				Yes	Director–battle scenes^{c}	
Alone Against Rome	1962				Yes	Director–Arena sequences	
Seven Seas to Calais	1962				Yes	Editor–naval battle scene^{d}	
The Witch's Curse	1962	Yes					
The Horrible Dr. Hichcock	1962	Yes					
The Seventh Sword	1962	Yes	Yes		Yes	Story	
Gold for the Caesars	1963				Yes	2nd unit director^{e}	
The Ghost	1963	Yes	Yes				
The Magnificent Adventurer	1963	Yes			Yes	Story	
Romeo e Giulietta	1964	Yes	Yes				
Genoveffa di Brabante	1964	Yes	Yes		Yes	Story	
The Two Orphans	1965	Yes	Yes				
Coplan FX 18 casse tout	1965	Yes					
Trap for the Assassin	1966	Yes		Yes			
Mexican Slayride	1967	Yes					
La morte non conta i dollari	1967	Yes					
Double Face	1969	Yes	Yes				
Tamar Wife of Er	1970	Yes					
The Iguana with the Tongue of Fire	1971	Yes	Yes	Yes	Yes	Story	
Tragic Ceremony	1972	Yes					
Murder Obsession	1981	Yes	Yes	Yes			
Un tour de manège	1989				Yes	Actor (Riccardo the film director)	
Revenge of the Musketeers	1994				Yes	Based on "an idea by Freda and Éric Poindron	

== Notes ==
- ^{a} Freda has denied having taken part in writing the script for this film, despite being credited.
- ^{b} Freda was originally to direct the film but stated that he walked off the set on the first day of shooting.
- ^{c} Freda name is not in the credits but some sources state he directed several battles scenes in the film, which Freda denies.
- ^{d} Freda name is not in the credits but some sources state he edited the naval battle scenes in the film, which Freda denies.
- ^{e} Freda has claimed to have shot the entire film.
