= Gábor Pogány =

Hungarian-born Italian cinematographer

- Born: 28 October 1915; Budapest, Austro-Hungarian Empire
- Died: 30 October 1999 (aged 84); Rome, Lazio, Italy
- Occupation: Cinematographer
- Years active: 1941 - 1991

Gábor Pogány (1915–1999) was a Hungarian-born Italian cinematographer. Born in Budapest and educated in Britain, Pogány emigrated to Italy and spent much of his career in the country. He worked on over a hundred films during his career, mainly Italian films as well as some international productions. He worked frequently with the director Vittorio De Sica on films such as Two Women (1960). In 1960 he won a Nastro d'Argento for best cinematography for his work in Alessandro Blasetti's European Nights.

Pogány's son Cristiano Pogany was also a cinematographer, who was born in 1947, Rome, Lazio, Italy and died on 18 February 1999, aged 52, in Rome, Lazio, Italy.

== Selected filmography ==
- First Love (1941)
- Carmela (1942)
- The Countess of Castiglione (1942)
- Document Z-3 (1942)
- Calafuria (1943)
- Resurrection (1944)
- Farewell, My Beautiful Naples (1946)
- The Man with the Grey Glove (1948)
- The Flame That Will Not Die (1949)
- The Fighting Men (1950)
- Women Without Names (1950)
- See Naples and Die (1951)
- Revenge of the Pirates (1951)
- The Forbidden Christ (1951)
- Altri tempi (1952)
- Sins of Rome (1953)
- One of Those (1953)
- A Slice of Life (1954)
- Camilla (1954)
- Storm (1954)
- Mata Hari's Daughter (1954)
- Joan of Arc at the Stake (1954)
- Friends for Life (1955)
- Love and Chatter (1957)
- The Italians They Are Crazy (1958)
- The Magistrate (1959)
- Two Women (1960)
- Sweet Deceptions (1960)
- The Last Judgment (1961)
- The Golden Arrow (1962)
- Imperial Venus (1962)
- Torpedo Bay (1963)
- The Cavern (1964)
- Samba (1965)
- Pedrito de Andía's New Life (1965)
- Pleasant Nights (1966)
- A Man Could Get Killed (1966)
- La morte non conta i dollari (1967)
- Three Bites of the Apple (1967)
- Buona Sera, Mrs. Campbell (1968)
- The Last Chance (1968)
- Double Face (1969)
- Hornets’ Nest (1970)
- The Man with Icy Eyes (1971)
- Valdez Is Coming (1971)
- Pink Floyd: Live at Pompeii (1972)
- Bluebeard (1972)
- Ripped Off (1972)
- Snow Job (1972)
- Stateline Motel (1973)
- Divorce His, Divorce Hers (1973)
- The Funny Face of the Godfather (1973)
- Two Missionaries (1974)
- The Cousin (1974)
- Unbelievable Adventures of Italians in Russia (1974)
- Night Train Murders (1975)
- Lips of Lurid Blue (1975)
- Colt 38 Special Squad (1976)
- Kleinhoff Hotel (1977)
- Antonio Gramsci: The Days of Prison (1977)
