= Sergei Lemeshev =

Soviet opera singer (1902–1977)

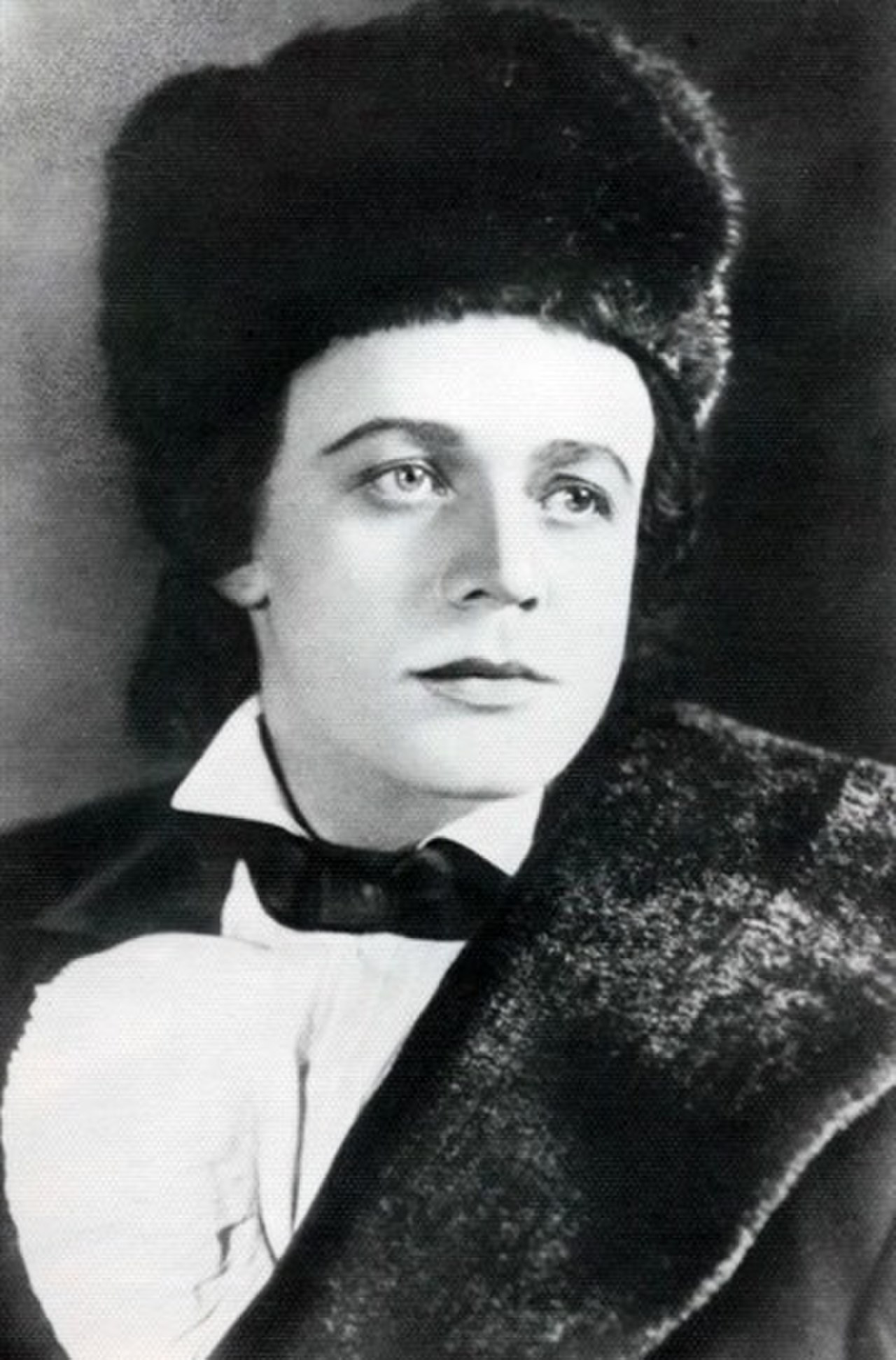
- Lemeshev as Lensky in Eugene Onegin
- Born: Sergei Yakovlevich Lemeshev; 10 July 1902; Staroe Knyazevo, Tverskoy Uyezd, Tver Governorate, Russian Empire
- Died: 27 June 1977 (aged 74); Moscow, Soviet Union
- Occupation: Operatic singer
- Years active: 1926–1975

Sergei Yakovlevich Lemeshev (Russian: Серге́й Я́ковлевич Ле́мешев; 10 July [O.S. 27 June] 1902 – 27 June 1977) was a Soviet and Russian opera singer and director. People's Artist of the USSR (1950).

== Biography ==
=== Early life and career ===
Lemeshev was born into a peasant family, and his father wanted him to become a cobbler. In 1914, he left a parish school and was sent to be trained to make shoes in Saint Petersburg. In 1917, he graduated from school in Tver, where he received vocal training. He began first at a local workers' club and later moved to Moscow.

Between 1921 and 1925, he studied at the Moscow Conservatory with Nazari Raisky. In 1924, he sang in the opera studio of Konstantin Stanislavski. From 1926 and 1931, he sang in the theatres of Sverdlovsk, Harbin, and Tbilisi.

In 1931 Lemeshev was invited to the Bolshoi Theatre, made his debut, and eventually became the theatre's soloist. His lyrical tenor of a soft and light timbre brought him popularity among admirers of the operatic art. The prime years of his operatic career were from 1931 to 1942. He was also a concert singer and a performer of traditional Russian folk songs. In 1938, he became the first artist to sing all 100 romances by Tchaikovsky in 5 concerts. Folk songs broadcast on the radio further sealed his stature as a national singer.

=== Health ===
The beginning of the Great Patriotic War was crucial for Lemeshev; during one evacuation he caught a very bad cold which resulted in two attacks of pneumonia, complicated by pleurisy and tuberculosis of the right lung. He was treated with artificial pneumothorax, which induced the therapeutic collapse of one lung. Although singing was forbidden, he adapted by being more conscious and sensitive with regard to his technique, and continued to sing with one lung from 1942 to 1948, when the other lung was also artificially collapsed and re-inflated. During that period he recorded Lakmé, The Snow Maiden, Les pêcheurs de perles, Mozart and Salieri and pieces from operas like The Barber of Seville and Rigoletto.

In 1947, he toured and performed at the Berlin State Opera. Along with his friendly rival, tenor Ivan Kozlovsky, he was the leading tenor at the Bolshoi until 1956.

=== Repertoire ===
Lemeshev's operatic repertoire consisted primarily of Russian works along with a particularly significant number of French and a few Italian and German pieces. Almost all works were performed in the Russian language. Unfortunately, very few complete recordings are available, with only excerpts available in spite of Lemeshev's numerous performances on stage in roles such as the Duke in Rigoletto and Almaviva in The Barber of Seville.

- Rodolfo in La Bohème by Giacomo Puccini
- Duke in Rigoletto by Giuseppe Verdi
- Romeo in Roméo et Juliette by Charles Gounod
- Almaviva in The Barber of Seville by Gioachino Rossini
- Levko in May Night by Nikolai Rimsky-Korsakov
- Alfredo in La Traviata by Giuseppe Verdi
- Astrologer in The Golden Cockerel by Nikolai Rimsky-Korsakov
- Vladimir Igorevich in Prince Igor by Alexander Borodin
- Rodolfo in Luisa Miller by Giuseppe Verdi
- Indian guest in Sadko by Nikolai Rimsky-Korsakov
- Lohengrin in Lohengrin by Richard Wagner
- Nadir in Les pêcheurs de perles by Georges Bizet
- Doctor Faust in Faust by Charles Gounod
- Tsar Berendei in The Snow Maiden by Nikolai Rimsky-Korsakov
- Boyan in Ruslan and Ludmila by Mikhail Glinka
- Prince Sidonal in The Demon by Anton Rubinstein
- Dubrovsky in Dubrovsky by Eduard Napravnik
- Gérald in Lakmé by Léo Delibes
- Werther in Werther by Jules Massenet
- Fra Diavolo in Fra Diavolo by Daniel Auber, among others.

=== Signature role as Lensky in Eugene Onegin ===
Lemeshev's signature role was as Lensky in Eugene Onegin by Pyotr Ilyich Tchaikovsky, and he performed it more than 500 times from 1927 onwards. He performed it for the last time on his 70th birthday, after suffering three heart attacks and having a lung removed.

=== Other key roles ===
In 1953 Lemeshev was given the prestigious title People's Artist of the USSR. He was also appointed assistant manager of the Bolshoi from 1957 to 1959. He debuted as director in 1951, with the production of La traviata in the Maly Opera Theatre in Leningrad (now known as the Mikhailovsky Theatre). Following this, he was made director for the production of Massenet's Werther in 1957 at the Bolshoi.

Toward the end of his career, he mainly gave concerts of Russian classic romances and folk songs, with performances aired on the radio, and taught in the Moscow Conservatory as associate professor.

He was buried in the Novodevichy Cemetery in Moscow.

== Lemeshev-mania ==
Lemeshev's talent, artistry, acting skills and conspicuous charm very quickly made him a public idol. Almost all his performances during the 1930s and 1940s were accompanied by crowds of fans following him through the streets, spending days and nights near his house.

While Lemeshev was one of the leading tenors of the Bolshoi Theatre, he was admired by female fans, who were jokingly called "lemeshistki." The theatre lobby was a venue for scuffles between the "lemeshistki" and the "kozlovityanki" (female fans of Lemeshev's rival Ivan Kozlovsky).

Additionally, the film "The Musical Story" (1940) in which he played the main role, brought him the Stalin prize, and even more widespread furore and fame all over the USSR.

== Personal life ==
Six marriages and numerous affairs focused the attention of Lemeshev's fans on his personal life. His fourth wife was the famous soprano Irina Maslennikova, who gave birth to Lemeshev's daughter Maria. Ultimately, he found his life partner in singer Vera Kudryavtseva. Their marriage lasted for over 20 years, until Lemeshev's death in 1977.

== Legacy ==
He authored the book "The Way to Art", published in 1968.

Asteroid number 4561 received the name Lemeshev in 1978, a year after Sergei Lemeshev's death.

== Recordings ==
- Tchaikovsky - Eugene Onegin, cond. Georgy Doniyakh, Leningrad, Maly Theatre (CD) Label: Aquarius (1954 Live recording)
- Tchaikovsky - Eugene Onegin, cond. Boris Khaikin, Bolshoi Theatre (CD) Label: Opera D'oro (1956 studio recording, remastered), 1999
- Rimsky-Korsakov - May Night, cond. Vasili Nebolsin, Bolshoi Theatre (3 LP Monarch MWL 338–340), about 1948.
- Scenes and Arias from Operas - Sergei Lemeshev (CD) Label: Yedang Entertainment, 2002
- Lebendige Vergangenheit: Sergei Lemeshev, Preiser Records Audio CD (July 4, 1998)
- A large number of CD's (42 so far) including 'live' concerts have been published by Aquarius, http://aquarius-classic.ru/albums?tid=6&ver=eng

more information

== Quotations about Lemeshev ==
"Soft spoken and self-effacing, Lemeshev hated his star status and all the pomp and partying that it implied. His workaholic attitude and exactingness were legendary and directors, conductors, accompanists, and fellow singers always found him a nice and easygoing man everyone loved to work with…" (Voice of Russia)

"He sang sul soffio (leaning on the breath), avoided stressful abdominal respiration (only Caruso could do it), and directed the sound current to the mask, the method of singing which was so much Lauri-Volpi's gospel." (Dr. Joseph Fragala)

"He developed a mixed voice of incomparable beauty, which made it possible for him to take the highest notes with such beautiful richness that even specialists could not explain how it was done technically….His high C’s … sounded virile and full…His manner of lowering his larynx a bit on high notes allowed him to perform the parts which ordinary lyric tenors did not sing, [roles such as] Rodolfo in La Bohème, Levko in May Night, Dubrovsky, Fra Diavolo…" (A.Orfenov)

== Bibliography ==
- Vasiliev, Viktor Dmitrievich: Doroga k Lemeshevu, Tver', 2002, ISBN 5-87049-247-5
