= The Black Eagle =

- Film poster
- Directed by: Riccardo Freda
- Screenplay by: Riccardo Freda; Mario Monicelli; Steno; Bracio Agoletti
- Story by: Riccardo Freda
- Based on: Dubrovsky by Alexander Pushkin
- Produced by: Nino Angioletti
- Starring: Rossano Brazzi; Irasema Dilián; Gino Cervi; Yvonne Sanson; Rina Morelli
- Cinematography: Rodolfo Lombardi
- Edited by: Otelo Colangeli
- Music by: Franco Casavola
- Production company: Cinematografica Distributori Indepdendenti
- Distributed by: Cinematografica Distributori Indepdendenti
- Release date: 21 September 1946 (Italy)
- Running time: 108 minutes
- Country: Italy
- Box office: ₤195 million

The Black Eagle (Italian: Aquila nera) is a 1946 Italian historical adventure drama film directed by Riccardo Freda and starring Rossano Brazzi, Irasema Dilián and Gino Cervi. It was released as Return of the Black Eagle in the United States. The film is based on the unfinished 1832 Russian novel Dubrovsky by Alexander Pushkin (1799–1837). It was followed by a 1951 sequel Revenge of the Black Eagle, also directed by Freda.

== Cast ==
- Rossano Brazzi as Vladimir Dubrowskij
- Irasema Dilián as Mascia Petrovic
- Gino Cervi as Kirila Petrovic
- Rina Morelli as Irina
- Harry Feist as Sergej Ivanovic
- Paolo Stoppa as Un bandito
- Inga Gort as Maria
- Petr Sharov as Il conte Andrea Dubrowskij
- Luigi Pavese as Un servo
- Angelo Calabrese as Il giudice
- Cesare Polacco as Il segretario Sputing
- Gina Lollobrigida as Una ragazza alla festa

== Production ==
Following the end of World War II, director Riccardo Freda returned to filmmaking in 1946 and following the musical comedies he had worked on, he began work on a period adventure film. Freda began work on adapting the unfinished novel Dubrovsky which was written in 1832 by Alexander Pushkin and published in 1841, four years after Pushkin's death. The story had already been previously adapted to film: first by Clarence Brown as The Eagle, and Dubrovsky by Alexsandr Ivanovsky.

To develop the script, Freda worked with his friend Steno and Mario Monicelli. Freda later spoke negatively about his relationship with Monicelli, finding that when Monicelli became famous, he began ignoring Freda.

Freda commented in his memoirs that he difficulty with the producers, stating that his film "went beyond verism or what the producers were willing to accept, and it consisted of totally different elements". Specifically, Freda recalled that the producers "could not imagine how our ciociari [the inhabitants of the South-East Lazio countryside] could play Cossacks".

== Release ==
The Black Eagle was distributed theatrically in Italy by Cinematografica Distributori Indepdendenti (C.D.I.) on 21 September 1946. It grossed a total of 195,000,000 Italian lire domestically in Italy. Film critic and historian Roberto Curti described the film as a "surprise hit" and became the second highest grossing Italian film that year, just after Rigoletto by Carmine Gallone. Curti was proud of the film's success stating that the film "blasted off like a bomb to chase away the fetid miasmas of neorealism" and that he recalled the theater owner of Civitavecchia writing him a letter to alert him when these productions would happen beforehand, as audiences were "so enthusiastic that they uprooted the theater's seats" which Freda remarked that it would "not happen with Umberto D".

The film was released in the United States as Return of the Black Eagle and in 1952 in the United Kingdom as The Black Eagle.

== Reception ==
The film was reviewed in the October 1952 Monthly Film Bulletin in the United Kingdom with an English-language dub and a 91-minute running time. The review declared the film "a piece of Italian spectacle" noting that "the treatment is energetic but unimpressive and the atmosphere far from credible". The review found the dubbing poor stating that it made it "difficult to judge the film on its real merit".

== See also ==
- The Eagle (1925)
- Dubrowsky (1959)
- List of Italian films of 1946
