= Vassili Nebolsin =

Russian conductor (1898–1958)

Vassili Vassilyevich Nebolsin (Russian: Василий Васильевич Небольсин; 11 June (30 May O.S.) 1898 – 29 October 1958) was a Russian conductor. He studied at the college of the Moscow Philharmonic and became conductor of the orchestra in 1918. He became choir master of the Bolshoi in 1920 and its conductor in 1922. He taught at the Moscow Conservatory from 1940 to 1945. The Stalin Prize was awarded him in 1950.

== Selected discography ==
Russian operas:

- Tchaikovsky: Eugene Onegin. Glafira Joukovskaya (Tatyana), Sergei Lemeshev (Lenski), Panteleimon Nortzov (Onegin), Alexander Pirogov (Gremin), Anatoly Yakhontov (Zaretski), Bronislava Zlatogorova (Olga), Konkordiya Antarova (Filipyevna), Maria Boutienina (Larina), Ivan Kovalenko (Triquet). Bolshoi 1936
- Mussorgsky: Khovanshchina, Alexei Krivchenya, Grigory Bolshakov, Nikander Khanaev, Alexei Ivanov, Mark Reizen, Maria Kaksakova, Bolshoi 1950
- Tchaikovsky: Mazeppa; Ivanov, Petrov, Davidova, Pokrovkaya, Bolshoi 1952
- Mussorgsky: Boris Godunov; Pirogov, Allaxverdov, Kayagina, Verbitskaja, Bolshoi 1954
- Napravnik: Dubrovsky Kozlovsky, Petrov, Vervitskaya, Godovkin, Malishev. Bolshoi 1954
- Rimsky-Korsakov: Invisible City of Kitezh, Petrov, Bolshoi 1956
- Rimsky-Korsakov: Tsar Saltan, Petrov, E. Smolenskaya, E. Verbitzkaya, Bolshoi, studio recording 1958?, released posthumously by Melodiya, 1959.

Foreign operas sung in Russian:

- Gounod: Roméo et Juliette, Lemeshev, Maslennikova, Burlak, Mikhailov, Bolshoi 1947
- Gounod: Faust, Shumskaya, Reizen, Bolshoi 1952
- Bizet: Carmen, Borisenko, Nelepp, Shumskaya, Ivanov, Koziezmia, Duoumanian, Bolshoi 1952

Film:

- Mussorgsky: Boris Godunov. Pirogov, Kozlovlsky, Bolshoi 1954 (108 Min.)
