= Napravnik =

Napravnik or Nápravník is a Czech surname. Notable people with the surname include:

- Eduard Nápravník (1839–1916), Czech conductor and composer
- Rosie Napravnik (born 1988), American jockey
