= Aleksey Apukhtin =

Russian poet, writer and critic (1840–1893)

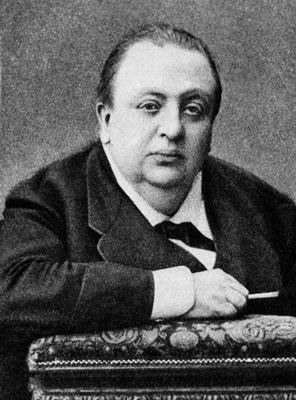
- Born: November 27, 1840; Bolkhov, Russia
- Died: August 29, 1893 (aged 52); Saint Petersburg, Russia

Aleksey Nikolayevich Apukhtin (Russian: Алексей Николаевич Апухтин, IPA: [ɐlʲɪkˈsʲej nʲɪkɐˈla(j)ɪvʲɪtɕ ɐˈpuxtʲɪn]; 27 November [O.S. 15 November] 1840 – 29 August [O.S. 17 August] 1893) was a Russian poet, writer and critic.

== Biography ==
Apukhtin was born in Bolkhov and came from an ancient noble family. While yet a child, he displayed an astounding memory and a fondness for reading, especially poetry. By the age of ten, he knew by heart the works of Pushkin and Lermontov. Besides these, his favorite poets and authors of later years were Griboyedov, Baratynsky, Tyutchev, Fet, A. Tolstoy, L. Tolstoy, Turgenev, Dostoyevsky and Ostrovsky.

In 1852, aged only 11, he entered the Imperial School of Jurisprudence in Saint Petersburg, where he was a class mate of Pyotr Ilyich Tchaikovsky, who was his exact contemporary and became a lifelong friend. The founder, duke Peter of Oldenburg, and the director, Alexander Yazykov, took him under their personal wings. He graduated with distinction in 1859. His work was encouraged by Turgenev and Fet.

While he was polite and courteous in the company of women, he became a witty storyteller in the company of men. His conversation was "imbued with such wit and clothed in such attractive form that for the sake of this alone one forgot the frivolity of the contents". He was seen as a boy genius and a second Pushkin. But his output failed to live up to these early expectations, and he expressed little interest in making any money from his writings. It was only in the face of lack of funds that he made any attempt to publish his poems, giving many of them as gifts to his friends, from whom they were later retrieved for a posthumous collected edition.

His friendship with Tchaikovsky was marked by cycles of disagreements and offences followed by reconciliations. Apukhtin dedicated several poems to Tchaikovsky. Like Tchaikovsky, Apukhtin was homosexual with a weakness for younger men, and often suffered the pain of unrequited love. But unlike Tchaikovsky, who never publicly acknowledged his sexual interests in other men, Apukhtin lived openly with his male lovers. His sexual tastes were discussed in society and ridiculed in the press.

He entered the civil service as a member of the Ministry of Justice. After two years retirement in the country (1862–64), he became associated with the Ministry of the Interior. He spent most of his life in St. Petersburg.

Apukhtin may have played a role in introducing Tchaikovsky to his future wife Antonina Milyukova. One of Apukhtin's friends was the singer Anastasia Khvostova, who was Antonina's brother's sister-in-law. Tchaikovsky first met Antonina at a soiree at Anastasia's home in 1865, when she was only 16.

In 1892, Tchaikovsky issued a warning to his beloved nephew Vladimir "Bob" Davydov to be wary of Apukhtin's interest in him. He was concerned that Apukhtin would seduce him, which was a source of jealousy as Davydov was also the subject of Tchaikovsky's unspoken sexual interest.

Aleksey Apukhtin suffered from obesity, shortness of breath and dropsy. He died in Saint Petersburg on 29 August 1893, aged 52. Grand Duke Konstantin suggested Tchaikovsky compose a requiem in honour of Apukhtin, set to Apukhtin's poem of the same name, but he declined, saying he had just completed his 6th Symphony, which was imbued with a mood similar to that in the poem, and he feared repeating himself so soon, but also because he had no desire to write any sort of Requiem. Tchaikovsky himself was to die suddenly just over two months later.

== Early literary career ==
Apukhtin's literary debut came in 1854–1855, while still at the Imperial School of Jurisprudence, when his poems "Epaminondas" and "Imitation of the Arabic" were published in Russkiy Invalid. From 1858 to 1861, he contributed to Sovremennik, the leading literary journal of the era. Under the pseudonym Sysoy Sysoyev, he wrote parodies and epigrams for the satirical journal Gudok between 1860 and 1862. In 1865, he delivered two public lectures on the life of Pushkin in Orel.

Apukhtin's verse was not collected in book form until 1886, when his first volume appeared. A second, expanded edition followed in 1891 and a third in 1893, the year of his death. Modest Tchaikovsky, the composer's brother, wrote a prefatory essay for the posthumous collected editions.

== Work ==
Apukhtin's poetry was known for its musicality and emotional directness, drawing on the tradition of the Russian romance. His best-known poems include "Crazy Nights" (Bezumnye nochi), "A Year in a Monastery" (God v monastyre), "Requiem," and "Prayer for the Cup" (Moleniye o chashe). His poem "Pair of Bay Horses" (Para gnedykh), set to music by Sergei Donarov, became a widely performed Russian romance, and its opening line — "We were once trotters too" (byli kogda-to i my rysakami) — entered Russian as a proverb.

Pyotr Ilyich Tchaikovsky set six of Apukhtin's poems as romances, including "Forget So Quickly" (1870), "No Response, No Word, No Greeting" (1875), and "Crazy Nights" (1886). Sergei Rachmaninoff, Anton Arensky, and Sergei Prokofiev also composed settings of his verse.

In prose, Apukhtin wrote Archive of Countess D. (Arkhiv grafini D., 1890), an epistolary novella, and Diary of Pavlik Dolsky (1891). His final work, the fantastic story Between Death and Life (1892), was published a year before his death.

== Legacy ==
Apukhtin was originally buried at the Nikolskoye Cemetery of the Alexander Nevsky Lavra. In 1956, his remains were reinterred at Literatorskiye Mostki in Volkovo Cemetery, Saint Petersburg. A street in his birthplace of Bolkhov was named in his honour in 1970 on the 130th anniversary of his birth. A monument was erected there in 2002, later relocated in 2009, and the central library of Bolkhov bears his name.

== Books ==
- From Death to Life (short novel), R. Frank, New York, 1917. from Archive.org
- The Archive of Countess D., from Eight Great Russian Short Stories, Fawcett Publications, 1962.
- Collection of Poems by Aleksey Apukhtin (English translations)
- Aleksey Apukhtin. Poems
- Three Tales by Aleksey Apukhtin ISBN 0-8386-3945-3

== Sources ==
- Alexander Poznansky, Tchaikovsky: The Quest for the Inner Man
- Tchaikovsky Research: Aleksey Apukhtin
