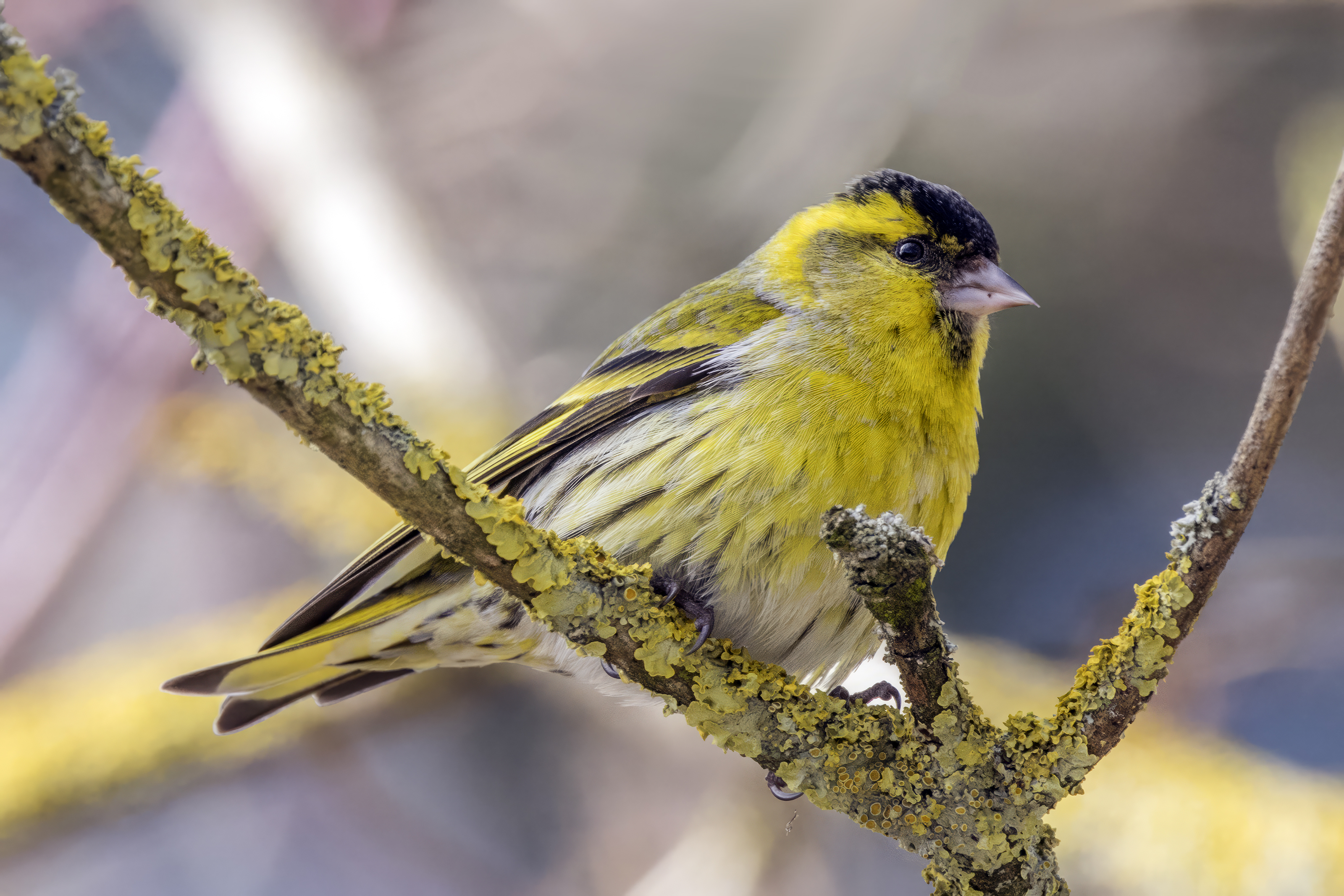
- Male
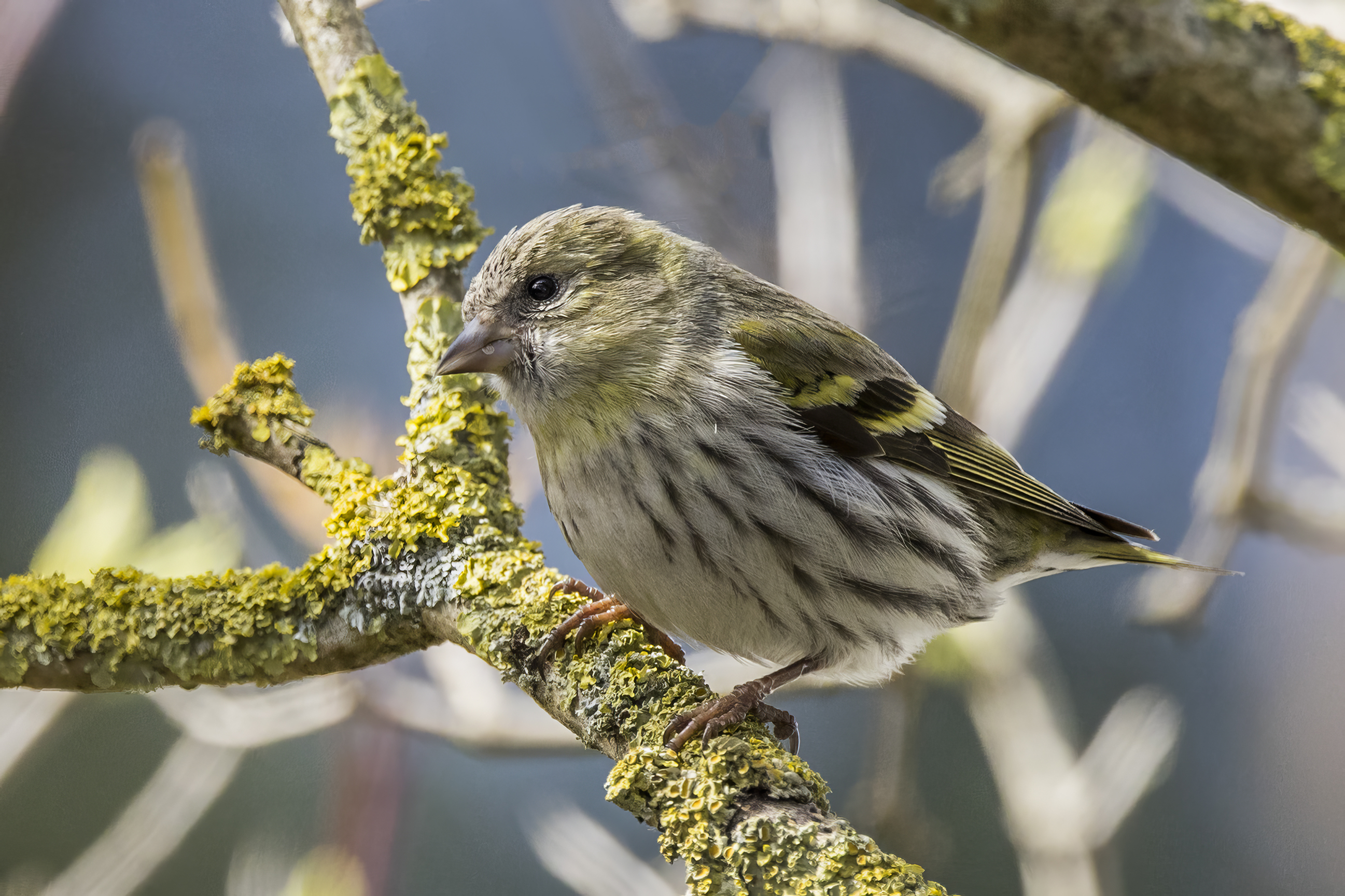
- Female A flock of siskins recorded in Surrey, England

Conservation status
- Least Concern (IUCN 3.1)

Scientific classification
- Kingdom: Animalia
- Phylum: Chordata
- Class: Aves
- Order: Passeriformes
- Family: Fringillidae
- Subfamily: Carduelinae
- Genus: Spinus
- Species: S. spinus

Binomial name
- Spinus spinus (Linnaeus, 1758)
- Range of the Eurasian siskin Breeding Resident Non-breeding

Synonyms
- Fringilla spinus Linnaeus, 1758; Carduelis spinus Linnaeus, 1758

= Eurasian siskin =

Species of bird

Eurasian siskin is a typical flock bird that wanders restlessly, often in large flocks of hundreds of individuals.

The Eurasian siskin (Spinus spinus) is a small passerine bird in the finch family Fringillidae. It is also called the European siskin, common siskin or just siskin. Other (archaic) names include black-headed goldfinch, barley bird and aberdevine. It is very common throughout Europe and Eurosiberia. It is found in forested areas, both coniferous and mixed woodland where it feeds on seeds of all kinds, especially of alder and conifers.

It can be distinguished from similar finches by its plumage colour. Its upperparts are greyish green and its underparts are grey-streaked white. Its wings are black with a striking yellow wing bar and its tail is black with yellow sides. The male has a predominantly yellow face and breast with a neat black cap. The female and young birds have a greyish-green head and no cap. It is a trusting, sociable and active bird. Its song is a pleasant mix of tweets and trills.

These birds exhibit an unusual migration pattern, migrating southwards in large numbers every few years in winter. The reasons for this behaviour are not known, but they may be related to climatic factors and, above all, the availability of food. This enables overwintering populations to thrive where food is abundant. This small finch is an acrobatic feeder and often hangs upside down like a tit. It will visit garden bird feeding stations.

== Taxonomy and systematics ==
The siskin was first described by Carl Linnaeus in his landmark 1758 10th edition of Systema Naturae as Fringilla spinus, in the 10th edition of Systema Naturae. In 1760, Brisson described the genus Carduelis, where this species was then placed. However, recent taxonomic studies suggest placing it in the genus Spinus.

The scientific name Spinus is from the Ancient Greek spinos, a name for a now-unidentifiable bird.

Although it is found across a wide area, it is a monotypic species; that is to say, there are no distinct subspecies. This could be explained by several factors. For example, there is spatial variability in individuals within breeding areas from one year to the next. The large overwintering area supports constant genetic interchange. Furthermore, females produce several clutches of eggs in one breeding season, each in a different location.

== Etymology ==
A siskin giving the 'siskin' calls from which its name derives

The name siskin is derived from an adaptation of the German dialect words sisschen, zeischen, which are diminutive forms of Middle High German (zîsec) and Middle Low German (ziseke, sisek) words, with cognates in Slavic languages, such as Czech čížek; these names are all of onomatopoeic origin, derived from the bird's calls. The name is first recorded in written English in 1544 in William Turner's Avium praecipuarum, quarum apud Plinium et Aristotelem mentio est, brevis et succincta historia.

== Description ==
The siskin is a small, short-tailed bird, 11–12.5 centimetres (4.3–4.9 in) in length with a wingspan that ranges from 20 to 23 centimetres (7.9 to 9.1 in). It weighs between 12 and 18 grams (0.42 and 0.63 oz).

The bird shows sexual dimorphism. The male has a greyish-green back, a yellow rump, yellow sides to the tail with a black tip, black wings with a distinctive yellow wing stripe, a yellowish breast that becomes whiter and striped towards the cloaca, a black bib (or chin patch) and two yellow auriculas and a black cap on its head. The amount of black on the bib varies greatly between males, and the size of the bib has been linked to dominance within a flock. The plumage of the female is more olive-coloured than that of the male. Its cap and auriculas are greenish with a white bib and a slightly striped, whitish-yellow rump. The young have a similar colouration to the females, with drab colours and a more subdued plumage.

The shape of the siskin's beak is determined by its feeding habits. Although slender, it is strong, enabling it to reach between the scales of spruce cones and alder fruit to access the seeds on which it feeds. Its legs and feet are dark brown, and its eyes are black.

Its flight pattern is rapid and bounding, similar to that of other finches.

The siskin is easy to recognise, but it can sometimes be confused with other finches, such as the citril finch, the European greenfinch or the European serin. The Eurasian siskin is a brightly coloured bird with many different plumages. Adult male Eurasian siskins have bright green and yellow plumage, a black cap, and an unstreaked throat and breast. Adult females also usually have green and yellow plumage tones, such as yellow on the supercilium and sides of the breast, and green tones on the mantle and yellow on the rump. The ground colour of the underparts of the Eurasian siskin is usually pure white. In females and juveniles, the centre of the belly and lower breast are often largely or entirely unstreaked. The wingbars of the Eurasian siskin are broad and yellow with white tips, and its bill is short with a decurved culmen.

== Distribution and habitat ==
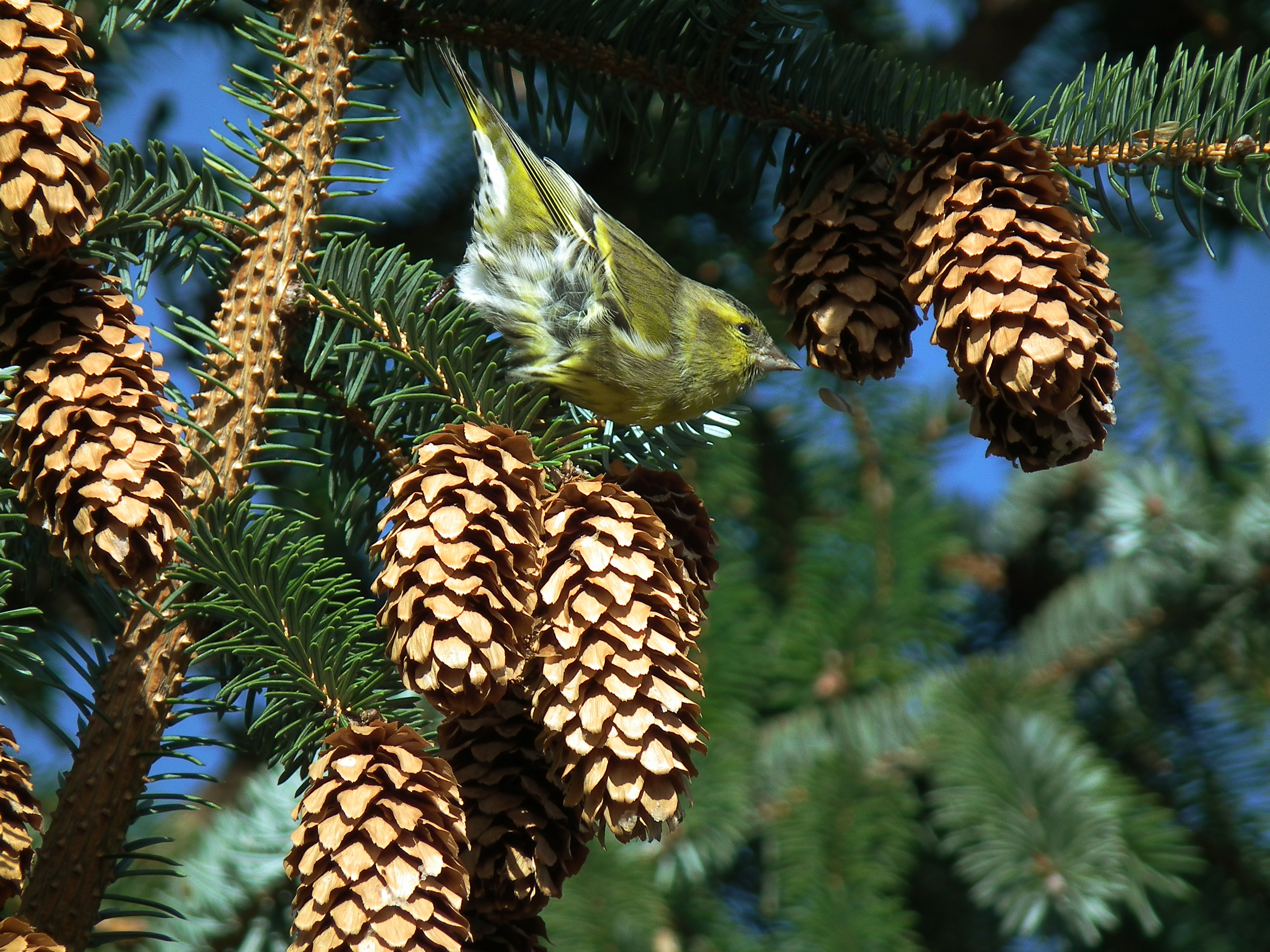
Siskin feeding on Sitka spruce seeds. Extensive plantations of this New World species in Britain have resulted a significant expansion of the species' range here

This species can be found across the greater part of Eurosiberia and the north of Africa. Its breeding area is separated into two zones, both on each side of the Palearctic realm: the eastern coast of Asia and the central and northern part of Europe.

These birds can be found throughout the year in Central Europe and in some mountain ranges in the south of the continent. They are also present in northern Scandinavia and Russia, and they overwinter in the Mediterranean basin and the area around the Black Sea. In China, they breed in the Khingan Mountains of Inner Mongolia and in Jiangsu province, and spend winter in Tibet, Taiwan, the valleys of the lower Yangtse River and the south east coast.

The Eurasian siskin is occasionally seen in North America. There is also a similar and closely related North America counterpart, the pine siskin (Spinus pinus).

Their seasonal distribution is also characterised by their anomalous migration pattern. Every few years they migrate southwards in larger numbers, greatly augmenting the overwintering populations in the Iberian Peninsula. This event has been the subject of various theories; one suggests that it occurs in the years when Norway spruce produces abundant seeds in central and northern Europe, causing populations to increase. Another theory is that greater migration occurs when the preferred food of alder or birch seed fails. Outside of the breeding season, this species will form large flocks, often mixed with redpolls.

It is a bird that does not stay in one area for long, but varies the areas it uses for breeding, feeding and overwintering from one year to the next.

It inhabits forested areas at a particular altitude on mountainsides, with a particular predilection for humid areas. Coniferous woodlands, especially of spruce, are favoured for breeding. It builds its nest in a tree and lays 2–6 eggs. The British range of this bird, which was once a local breeder, has expanded greatly due to an increase in commercial conifer plantations. The siskin also breeds in mixed woodland and, in winter, prefers stubble and crops and areas containing trees with seeds.

== Behaviour and ecology ==
They are very active and restless birds. They are also very social, forming small cohesive flocks especially in autumn and winter. They are fairly trusting of humans, it being possible to observe them from a short distance. During the breeding season, however, they are much more timid, solitary and difficult to observe. For this reason there is a German legend which says that siskins guard a magic stone in their nests that makes them invisible. It is one of the few species which has been described as exhibiting "allofeeding"' behaviour, this is where subordinates (of the same sex) regurgitate food for the dominant members of the group, which creates a strong cohesion in the flocks and implies a hierarchical structure within the group.

=== Feeding ===
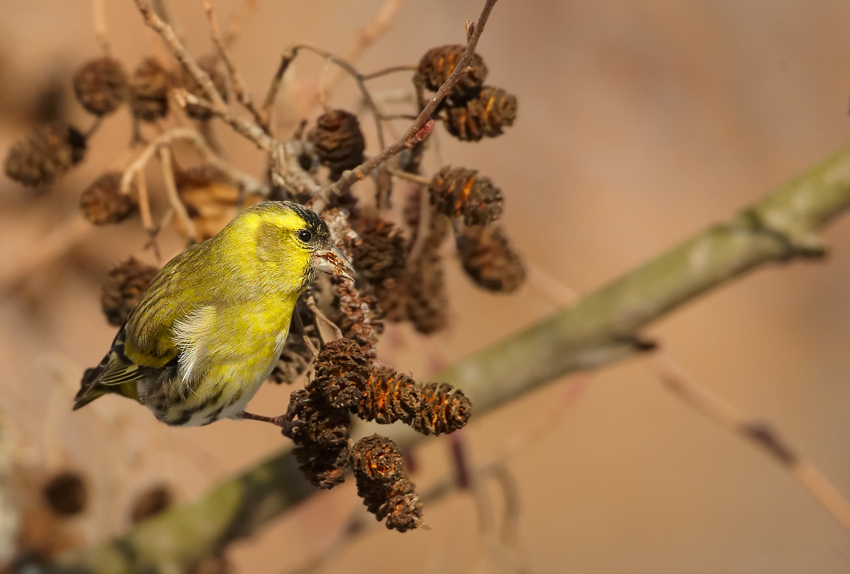
Siskin feeding in an alder tree

The siskin is primarily a granivore, though its diet varies depending on the season. It primarily feeds in trees and avoids doing so on the ground.

The diet is based primarily on the seeds of both coniferous (especially spruce and larch, as well as species planted in gardens such as Lawson's cypress) and broadleaf trees such as birch and, above all, alder, focusing on species with seeds 2–3 mm long. They also visit cultivated areas and pasture, where they join with other finches in eating the seeds of various Asteraceae such as thistles, dandelions, Artemisia, knapweeds and other herbaceous plants, such as St. John's wort, meadowsweet and sorrel.

During the breeding season in spring, they are primarily found in spruce forests. At this time, their diet mainly consists of the seeds of these trees. They also feed on elm and poplar seeds. When feeding their young, they eat more insects, mainly beetles, as the proteins they contain help the chicks to grow. In summer, their diet becomes more varied, incorporating other herbaceous plants alongside conifer seeds, including goosefoots and other Asteraceae.

=== Reproduction ===
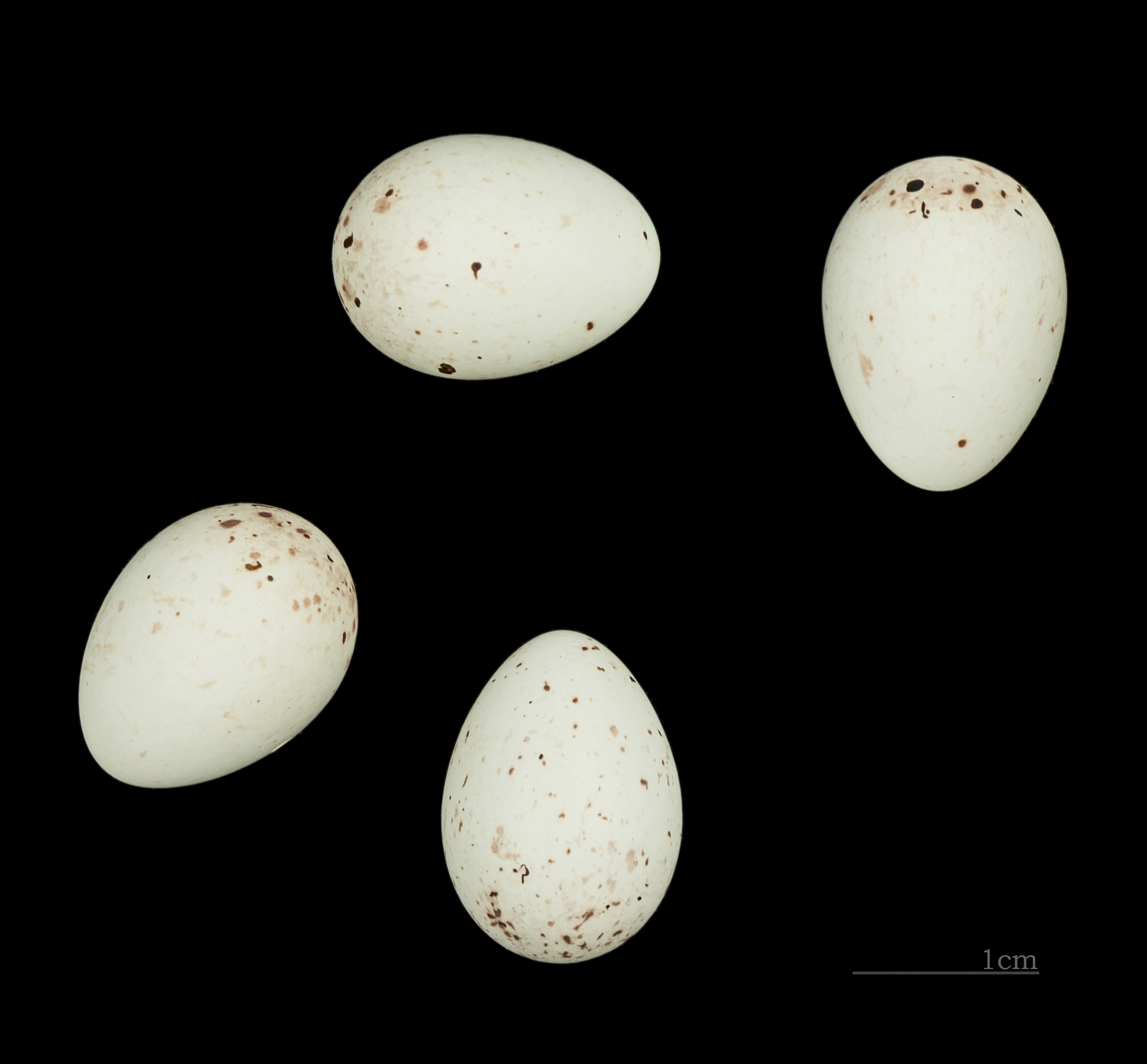
Eggs of Spinus spinus

Pairs are generally formed during the winter period before migration. Males compete aggressively for females. As part of the courtship, the male fluffs up the feathers of his pileum and rump to make himself bigger. He also extends his tail and sings repeatedly. They also make mating flights from tree to tree, although these are not as eye-catching as those of other finches. They construct a nest that is generally located at the end of a relatively high branch in a conifer, such as spruce, fir, or pine, so that the nest is reasonably hidden and difficult to see. They form small colonies of up to six pairs with the nests located near to each other. The nest is small and bowl-shaped. It is made from small twigs, dried grasses, moss and lichen and lined with down.

The first brood is born in mid-April. The female lays between 2 and 6 eggs. The eggs are white or light grey or light blue, with small brown spots and they are approximately 16.5 mm by 12 mm in size. Incubation takes between 10 and 14 days and is carried out entirely by the female. The chicks are altricial and nidicolous. They leave the nest after 15 days in a semi-feathered condition. They then remain close to the nest area for up to a month when, with their plumage now complete, they disperse. The siskin usually has a second brood, from the middle of June up to the middle of July.

=== Song and calls ===
This bird has two calls, both powerful but conflicting, one is descending and the other is ascending, their onomatopoeic sounds can be represented as "tilu" and "tluih". On occasions they also issue a harsh rattling chirrup.

Like other finches, the song is a smooth, rapid twitter and trill of long duration, occasionally interrupted by stronger or shorter syllables. Siskins sing throughout the year, often in groups.

== Status and conservation ==
The global population of siskins is estimated to be between 20 and 36 million. The European population is estimated as between 2.7 and 15 million pairs. As there has not been a significant population decline in population numbers, the IUCN has listed the siskin's conservation status as least concern. It appears in Annex II of the Berne Convention as a protected bird species.

== Relationship with humans ==
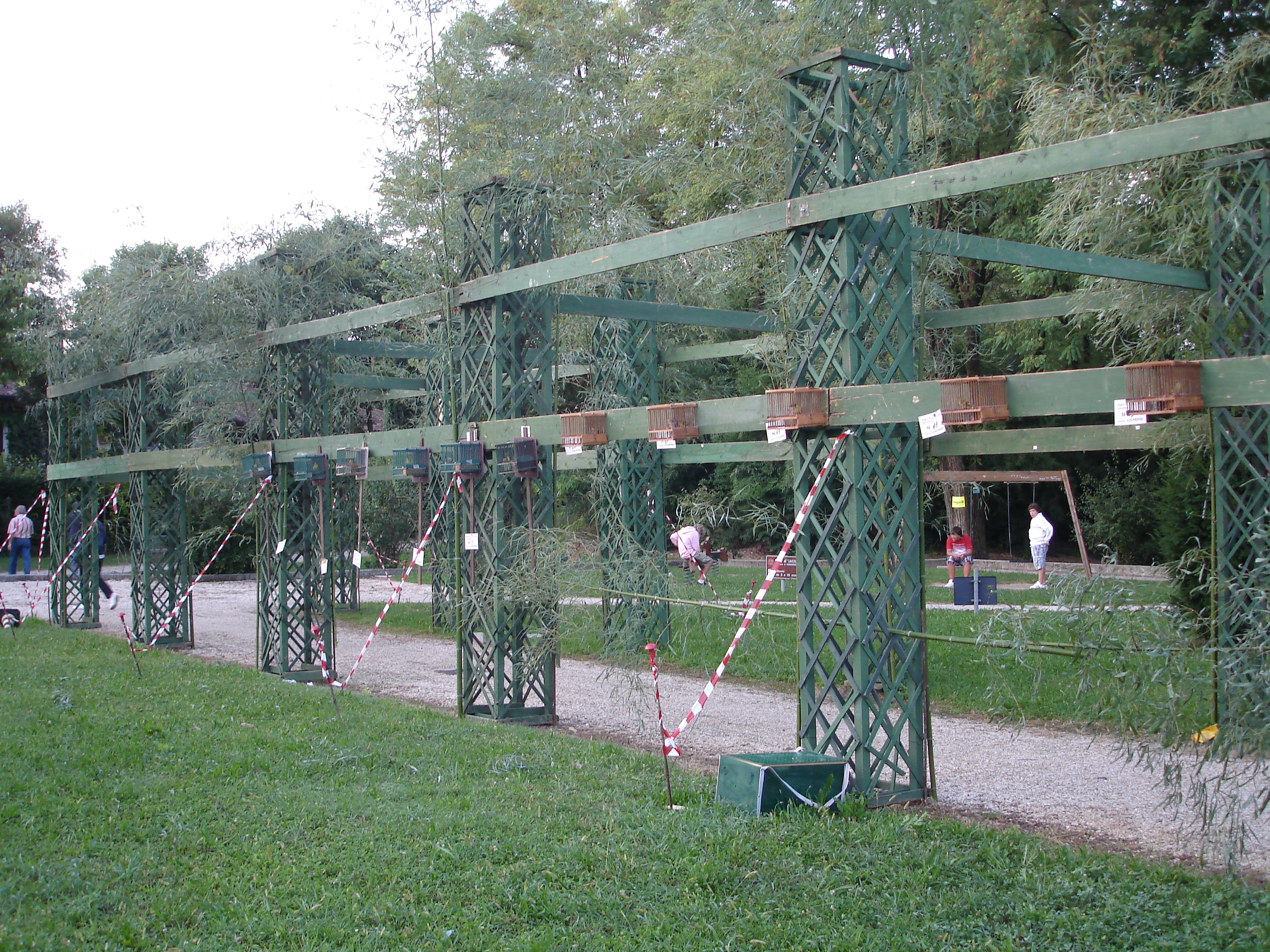
Structure holding cages used for listening to siskins at the singing contest of Sagra dei Osei, Italy

Like many of the finches, the siskin is popular with aviculturalists as a domestic bird for its song and appearance. They do not require specific care, adapt well to captivity, and are easy to keep, although they do not breed well in captivity. There are no specific diseases that affect the species, although they can exhibit intestinal pathologies associated with poor nutrition. They live for between 11 and 14 years, in sharp contrast to the 2 or 3 years it is estimated they live in the wild.

In captivity, they can produce hybrids with some other finches (for example, canaries) giving rise to intermediate birds. Hybridisation also occurs in nature without human intervention. In some areas, individuals that are found are the result of escapes or releases of captive birds.

=== Cultural depictions ===
Poland, Gibraltar, Benin and Belgium have all issued postage stamps bearing the image of the siskin.

In Saint Petersburg there is a statue of a siskin, as its colours match those of the uniform worn by the students at an elite school in the city. These students have come to be known by the sobriquet siskin, Russian: Чиж. This term was popularised in the Russian song "Chizhik-Pyzhik". There has been a statue of a siskin on the embankment by the First Engineer Bridge since 1994, though it has been stolen and replaced multiple times.

There is a Czech folk song/dance/game "Čížečku, čížečku", in which the siskin is the source of the lore on what happens with the poppy.

In the novel Three Daughters of Eve, Elif Shafak mentions a siskin in a pivotal scene in which the heroine, Peri, meets the charismatic and controversial Professor Azur. Upon entering Professor Azur's office, Peri finds a siskin with yellow-green feathers and a forked tail trapped amid the shelves and stacks of books.
