= Dubrovsky (novel) =

Novel by Alexander Pushkin

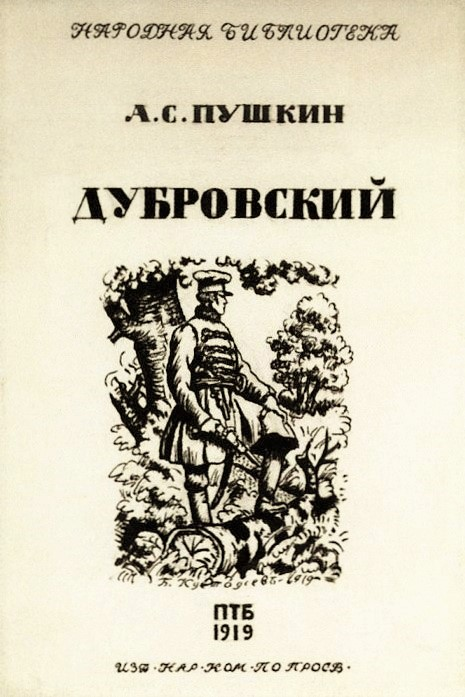
- Dubrovsky, illustrated by Boris Kustodiev, 1919
- Author: Alexander Pushkin
- Original title: Дубровский
- Language: Russian
- Genre: Novel
- Publication date: 1841
- Publication place: Russia
- Media type: Print (Hardback & Paperback)
- ISBN: 1-84391-053-5 (recent paperback edition)
- OCLC: 52056603

Dubrovsky (Russian: «Дубровский») is an unfinished novel by Alexander Pushkin, written in 1832 and published after Pushkin's death in 1841. The name Dubrovsky was given by the editor.

== Plot summary ==
Andrei Dubrovsky is an old poor nobleman whose land is confiscated by a greedy, rich and powerful aristocrat, Kirila Petrovitch Troekurov. His young son Vladimir, determined to venge his father and to get justice one way or another, gathers a band of serfs and goes on the rampage, stealing from the rich and giving to the poor. Along the way, Vladimir Dubrovsky falls in love with Masha, Troekurov's daughter, and lets his guard down, with tragic results.

== Editions and translations ==
- "The Works of Alexander Pushkin". Lyrics, Narrative poems, Folk tales, Plays, Prose. Selected and edited, with an introduction by Avrahm Yarmolinsky. New York: Random House [1936]. viii, 893 p. Contents: Introduction. Lyrics and ballads <...> Dubrovsky. Egyptian nights (all translated by T. Keane). The Captain's daughter (translated by Natalie Duddington).
- Reprinted: Unto myself I reared a monument, translated by Babette Deutsch, in Russki golos, New York, 1937, Feb. 7, sec. 1, also in Moscow News, Moscow, 1937, v. 7, no. 7, p. 3, also in Moscow Daily News, Moscow, 1937, no. 29, p. 3.
- Behold a sower went forth to sow. Verses written during a sleepless night. Work, Parting, all translated by Babette Deutsch, in Russki golos, New York, 1937, Feb. 21, p. 5. Excerpts from Evgeny Onegin, translated by Babette Deutsch, in Moscow Daily News. Moscow, 1937, no. 33. p. 2, 4,
- The Snowstorm reprinted in Moscow Daily News, 1937, no. 34–36.
- "The Captain's daughter and other tales...", Translated, with an introduction, by Natalie Duddington. London: J. M. Dent & Sons, Ltd.; New York: E. P. Dutton & Co., 1933. xi, 266 p. (Everyman's library). Contents: Introduction. Bibliographical notes. The Captain's daughter. The Queen of spades. Dubrovsky. Peter the Great's negro. The Station-master. Reviewed by Ben Ray Redman in Books, New York, v. 10, Feb. 11, 1934, p. 12.
- "Dubrovsky". (In: Tales from the Russian [translated by Mrs. Sutherland Edwards?]. London: Railway and General Automatic Library [1892]) A copy in British Museum.
- "Dubrovski; a tale of old Russia... "Translated by Reginald Merton. (The Argosy. London, 1928. 8°. v. 4, no. 27, p. 33—54).
- The Lady peasant. Dubrovsky; translated by T. Keane. (In: The Omnibus of romance... edited by John Grove [pseud, of John R. Colter]. New York: Dodd, Mead & Company, 1931. 594 p.) A copy in Circulation Department.
- The Prose tales of A. Pushkin; translated by T. Keane. London: G. Bell and Sons, Ltd., 1894. 402 p. 8°. Copy in British Museum.
- Contents: The Captain's daughter. Dubrovsky. Queen of spades. Amateur peasant girl. The Shot. The Snowstorm. The Postmaster. The Coffin-maker. Kirdjali. Authority: W. S. Sonnenschein, A reader's guide to contemporary literature. New York: G. P. Putnam's Sons, 1895, p. 587.
- Reprinted with the addition of The Egyptian nights and Peter the Great's negro in Bohn's Standard Library, London, in 1896, 1911, 1916. Copy of 1896 edition in Library of Congress. A copy of 1916 edition. Authority for 1911 edition on verso of t.-p. of 1916 edition.
- Another edition issued in London by G. Bell and Sons In 1914, and reprinted in 1919, 1926. Authority for 1914 and 1919 editions on verso of 1926 edition. A copy of 1914 edition in the Library of Congress.
- Also published by the Macmillan Company, New York in 1894, 1896, 1914. Authority: American catalog, 1890—1895, p. 358; 1895—1900, p. 399, and the Cumulative book index, v. 18, p. 618.
- Also published under title: "The Captain's daughter and other tales", by Hodder and Stoughton, London, in 1915. Copy in Circulation Department. Reprinted in 1916. Authority: English catalog, 1916/20, p. 918.
- Also published in 1925 by Harcourt, Brace and Company. New York. Authority: Cumulative book index, v. 28, p. 1009.
- "Dubrovsky and Egyptian Nights" by Alexander Pushkin. Translated by Robert Chandler, with foreword by Patrick Neate,

Hesperus Press, October 2003, Paperback, English, ISBN 1-84391-053-5.

== Film, TV or theatrical adaptations ==
- Dubrovsky (opera) by Eduard Nápravník (1839–1916), premiered on January 15, [OS January 3] 1895, St Petersburg.
- The Eagle, silent film

Director: Clarence Brown
Producer: John W. Considine, Jr./Art Finance Corp.
Writer: Hans Kraly (scenario)
Main Cast: Rudolph Valentino, Vilma Bánky, Louise Dresser, James A. Marcus
Cinematography: George Barnes, Dev Jennings
Distributed by: United Artists
Release date: November 8, 1925 (USA)
Country: USA
Running Time: 80 min.

- Dubrovsky, film, romantic adventure drama

Director: Alexander V. Ivanovsky
Main Cast: Boris Livanov, Nikolai Monakhov, Galina Grigoryeva, Vladimir Gardin, Mikhail Tarkhanov
Release Year: 1935
Country: Soviet Union
Running Time: 75 min.

- Black Eagle (Aquila nera), feature film

Director: Riccardo Freda
Main Cast: Rossano Brazzi, Irasema Dilián, Gino Cervi
Minor Cast: Gina Lollobrigida
Release Year: 1946
Country: Italy
Running Time: 97 min.

- Dubrowsky, feature film

Director: William Dieterle
Main Cast: John Forsythe, Rosanna Schiaffino, William Dieterle
Release Year: 1959
Country: Italy / Yugoslavia
Running Time: 115 min.

- Noble Brigand Vladimir Dubrovsky, TV series

Director: Vyacheslav Nikiforov
Main Cast: Mikhail Yefremov, Marina Zudina, Vladimir Samoylov, Kirill Lavrov
Release Year: 1989
Country: Soviet Union

- Dubrovskiy, feature film and TV mini-series

Director: Alexander Vartanov and Kirill Mikhanovsky
Writers: Konstantin Chernozatonsky, Mikhail Brashinsky
Main Cast: Danila Kozlovsky, Igor Gordin, Klavdiya Korshunova, Yuriy Tsurilo
Producer: Evgeniy Gindilis
Cinematography: Vsevolod Kaptur, Anastasiy Mikhailov
Composer: Aleksey Aygi
Release Year: 2014
Country: Russia
Running Time: 123 min. (film), 5 episodes of 42 min. each (TV mini-series)
