= Chvojenec =

- Municipality
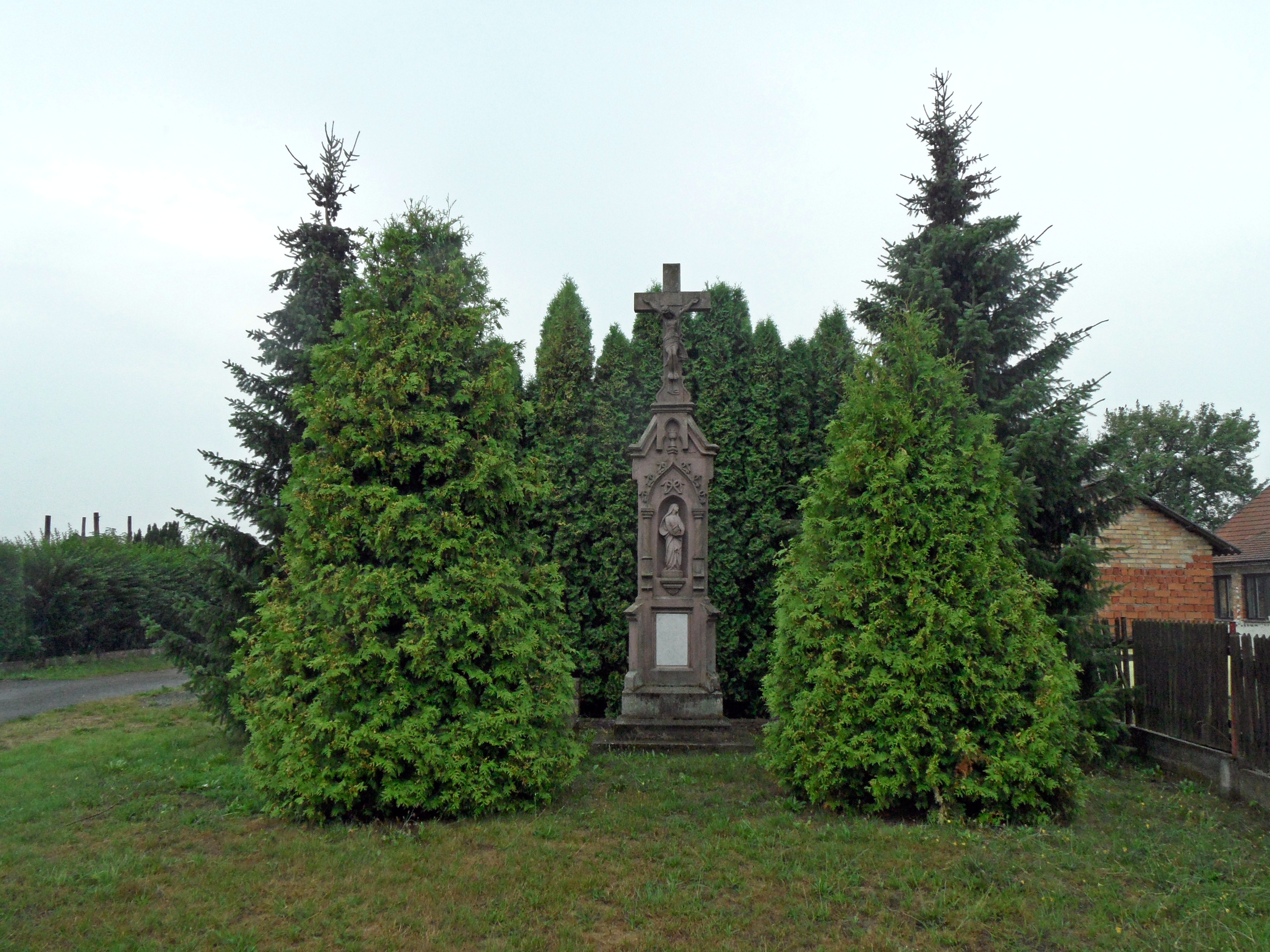
- A cross in Chvojenec

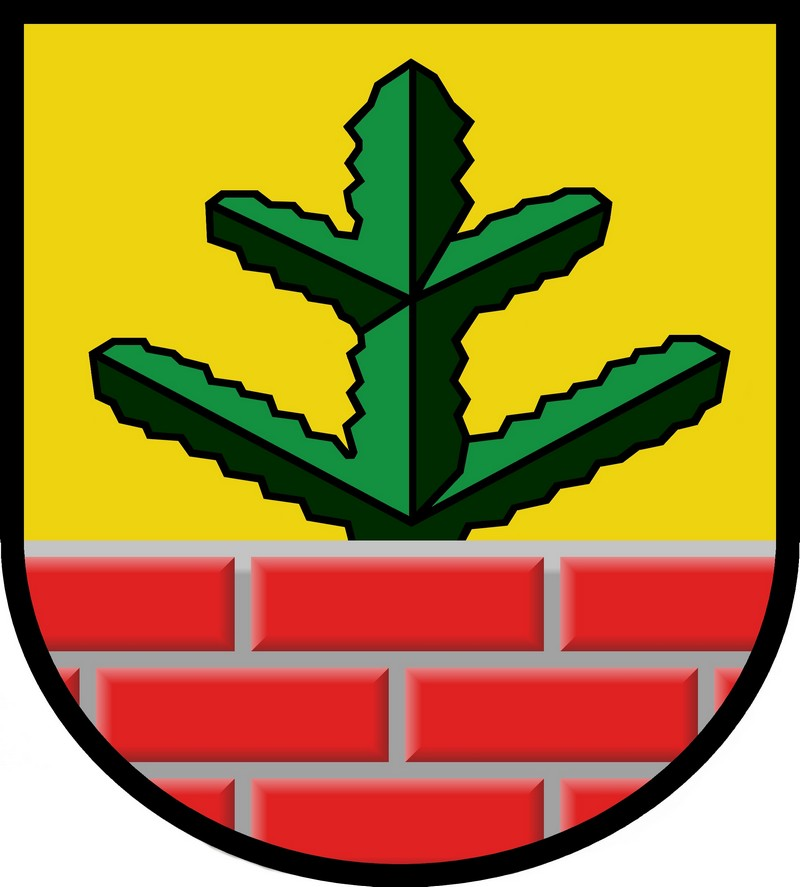
- Flag Coat of arms

- Location in the Czech Republic
- Coordinates: 50°6′35″N 15°56′14″E
- Country: Czech Republic
- Region: Pardubice
- District: Pardubice
- First mentioned: 1336

Area
  - Total: 9.92 km^{2} (3.83 sq mi)
- Elevation: 245 m (804 ft)

Population (2026-01-01)
  - Total: 805
  - Density: 81.1/km^{2} (210/sq mi)
- Time zone: UTC+1 (CET)
  - Summer (DST): UTC+2 (CEST)
- Postal code: 534 01
- Website: www.chvojenec.cz

Chvojenec is a municipality and village in Pardubice District in the Pardubice Region of the Czech Republic. It has about 800 inhabitants.

== Geography ==
Chvojenec is located about 13 kilometres (8 mi) northeast of Pardubice and 12 km (7 mi) southeast of Hradec Králové. It lies on the border between the East Elbe Table and Orlice Table. The highest point is at 305 m (1,001 ft) above sea level.

== History ==
The first written mention of Chvojenec is from 1336, when it was a part of Chvojno estate. A small fortress stood here until the 16th century. Chvojenec was known for the production of pitch.

During the 18th century Chvojenec, together with Rokytno and Býšť, was the centre of a persecuted religious sect of Deists called blouznivci.

== Demographics ==
Historical population

Year	Pop.	±%
1869	697	—
1880	778	+11.6%
1890	816	+4.9%
1900	836	+2.5%
1910	772	−7.7%

Year	Pop.	±%
1921	806	+4.4%
1930	827	+2.6%
1950	622	−24.8%
1961	679	+9.2%
1970	598	−11.9%

Year	Pop.	±%
1980	646	+8.0%
1991	592	−8.4%
2001	586	−1.0%
2011	733	+25.1%
2021	727	−0.8%

Source: Censuses

== Transport ==
The I/35 road from Hradec Králové to Olomouc runs through the municipality.

== Sights ==
The only protected cultural monument in the municipality are terrain remains of the former water fortress, now an archaeological site.
