= Býšť =

- Municipality
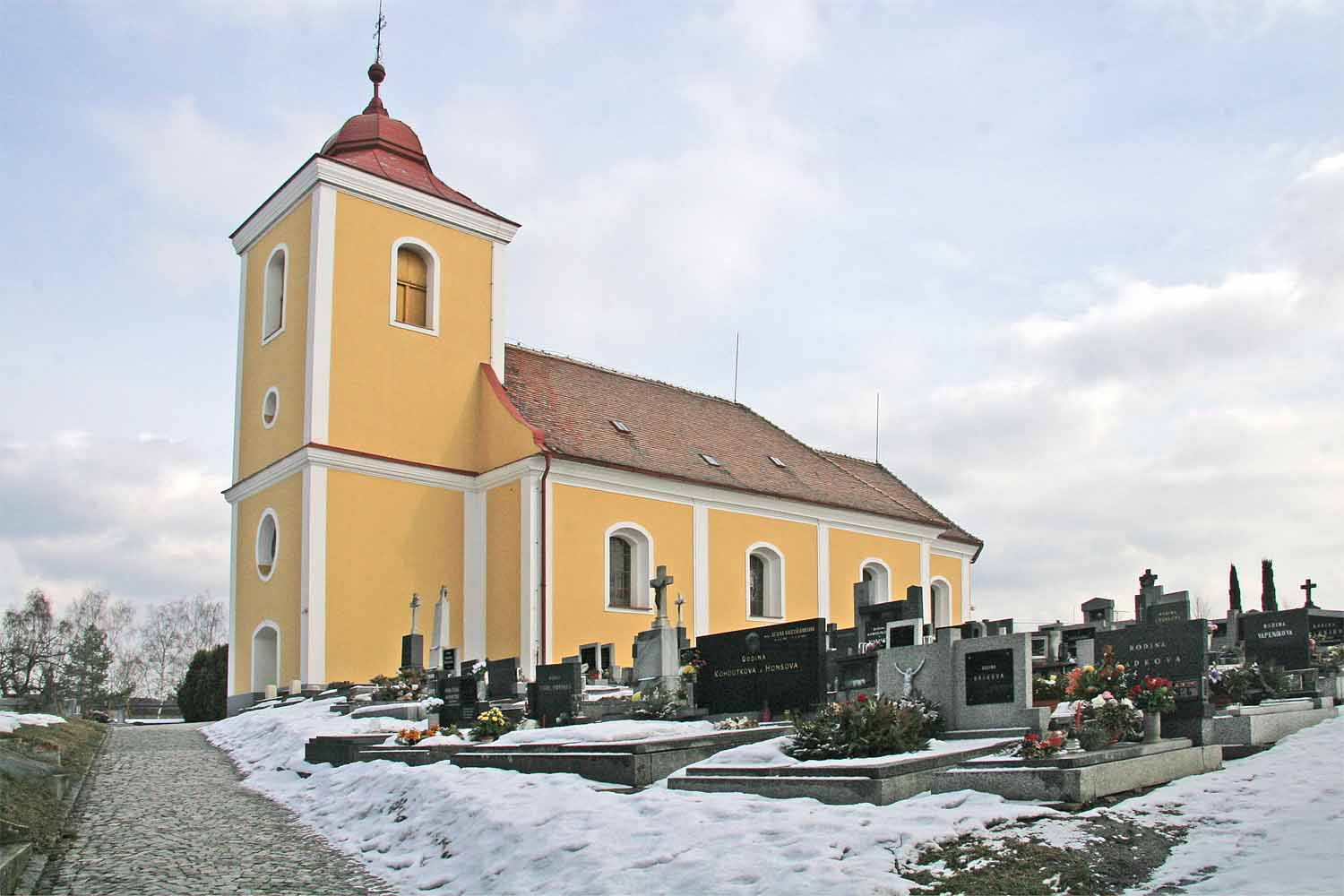
- Church of Saint George

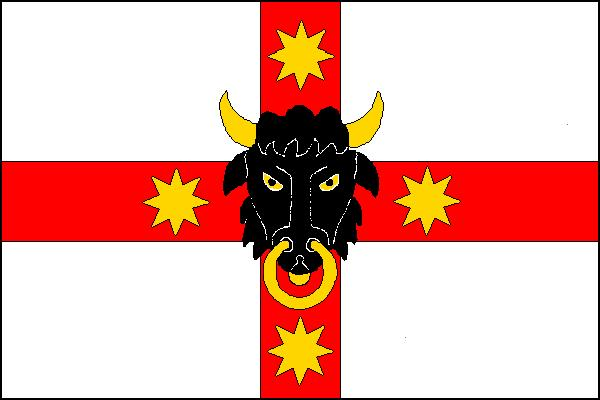
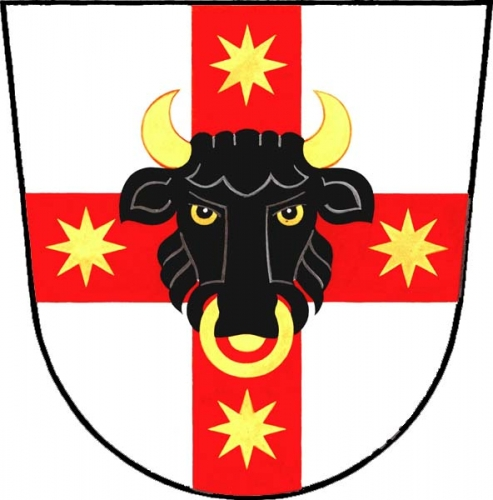
- Flag Coat of arms

- Location in the Czech Republic
- Coordinates: 50°7′57″N 15°54′40″E
- Country: Czech Republic
- Region: Pardubice
- District: Pardubice
- First mentioned: 1360

Area
  - Total: 34.09 km^{2} (13.16 sq mi)
- Elevation: 305 m (1,001 ft)

Population (2026-01-01)
  - Total: 1,689
  - Density: 49.55/km^{2} (128.3/sq mi)
- Time zone: UTC+1 (CET)
  - Summer (DST): UTC+2 (CEST)
- Postal code: 533 22
- Website: www.byst.cz

Býšť (German: Bejscht, Beyscht) is a municipality and village in Pardubice District in the Pardubice Region of the Czech Republic. It has about 1,700 inhabitants.

== Administrative division ==
Býšť consists of four municipal parts (in brackets population according to the 2021 census):

- Býšť (962)
- Bělečko (261)
- Hoděšovice (369)
- Hrachoviště (94)

== Etymology ==
The name is derived from the personal name Býšek or Býška.

== Geography ==
Býšť is located about 14 kilometres (9 mi) northeast of Pardubice and 8 km (5 mi) southeast of Hradec Králové. It lies on the border between the East Elbe Table and Orlice Table.

== History ==
The first written mention of Býšť is from 1360, when the church was mentioned. Býšť was devastated during the Thirty Years' War. The first school here was built in 1780. During the 19th century, there was also a synagogue.

In the 18th century, Býšť, together with Rokytno and Chvojenec, was the centre of a persecuted religious sect of Deists called blouznivci.

== Demographics ==
Historical population

Year	Pop.	±%
1869	1,845	—
1880	1,943	+5.3%
1890	1,810	−6.8%
1900	1,717	−5.1%
1910	1,626	−5.3%

Year	Pop.	±%
1921	1,466	−9.8%
1930	1,288	−12.1%
1950	1,087	−15.6%
1961	1,045	−3.9%
1970	927	−11.3%

Year	Pop.	±%
1980	797	−14.0%
1991	798	+0.1%
2001	982	+23.1%
2011	1,525	+55.3%
2021	1,686	+10.6%

Source: Censuses

== Transport ==
The I/35 road from Hradec Králové to Olomouc runs through the municipality.

== Sights ==
The main landmark of Býšť is the Church of Saint George. The current Baroque building dates from 1822, when it was reconstructed after a fire.

== Notable people ==
- Eduard Nápravník (1839–1916), conductor and composer
