= Rokytno =

- Municipality
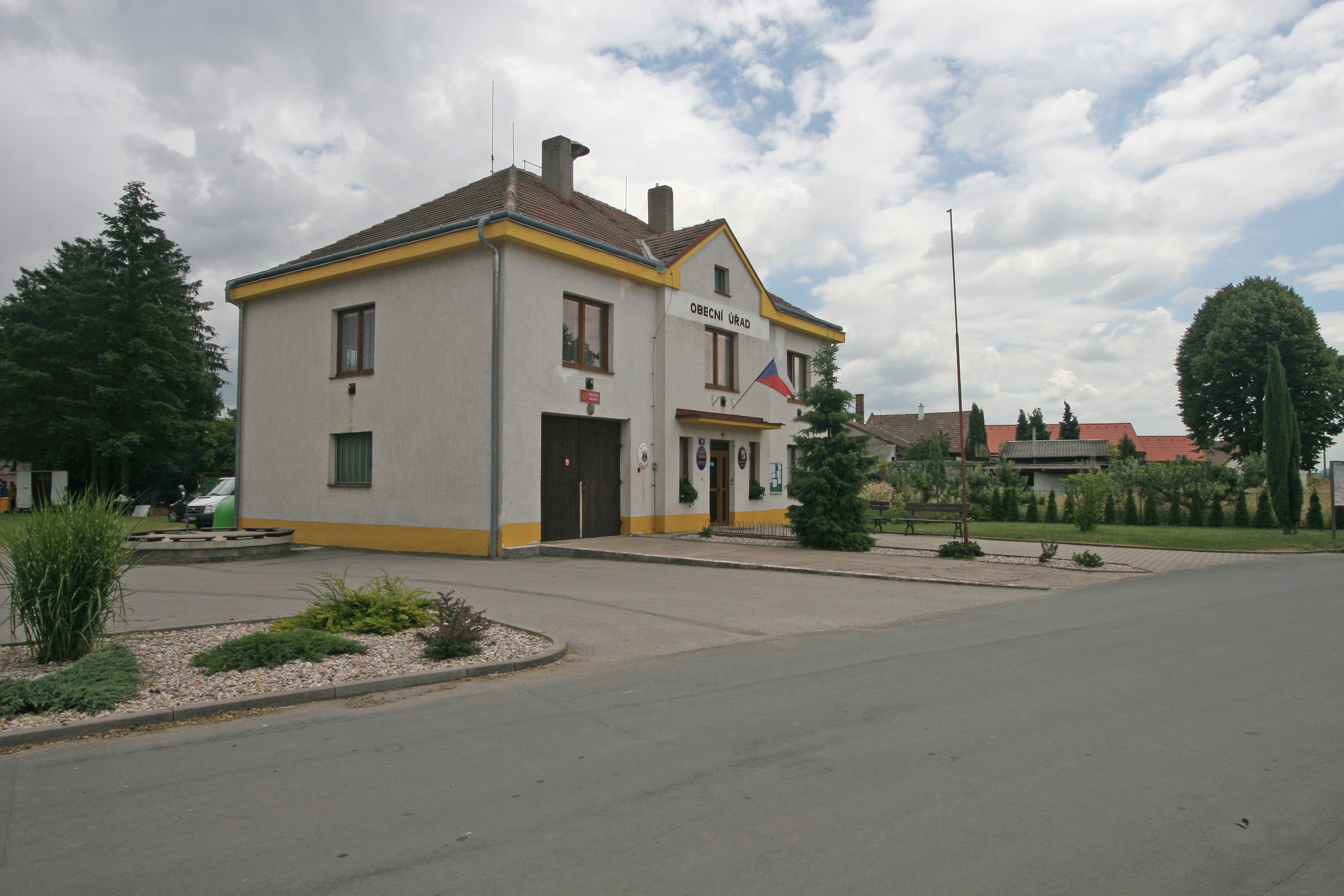
- Municipal office

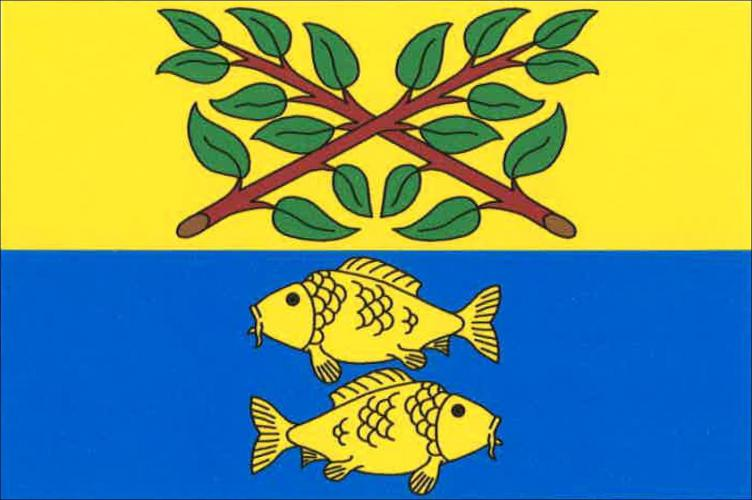
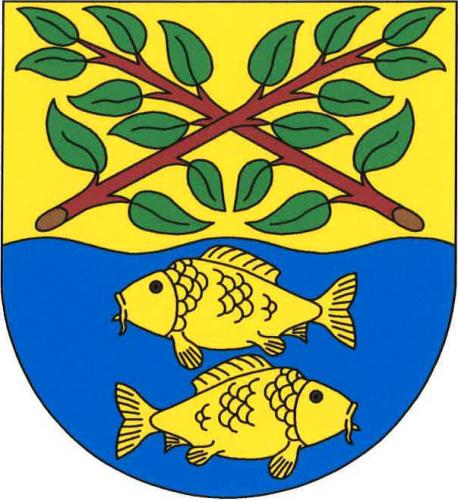
- Flag Coat of arms

- Location in the Czech Republic
- Coordinates: 50°6′17″N 15°53′22″E
- Country: Czech Republic
- Region: Pardubice
- District: Pardubice
- First mentioned: 1436

Area
  - Total: 10.85 km^{2} (4.19 sq mi)
- Elevation: 230 m (750 ft)

Population (2026-01-01)
  - Total: 932
  - Density: 85.9/km^{2} (222/sq mi)
- Time zone: UTC+1 (CET)
  - Summer (DST): UTC+2 (CEST)
- Postal code: 533 22
- Website: www.rokytno.eu

Rokytno is a municipality and village in Pardubice District in the Pardubice Region of the Czech Republic. It has about 900 inhabitants.

== Administrative division ==
Rokytno consists of three municipal parts (in brackets population according to the 2021 census):

- Rokytno (625)
- Bohumileč (205)
- Drahoš (45)

== Etymology ==
The name is derived from the word rokytí. It is an Old Czech term for willows that grew here in swampy areas.

== Geography ==
Rokytno is located about 10 kilometres (6 mi) northeast of Pardubice. It lies in the East Elbe Table, in the Polabí region. The fishpond Bohumilečský rybník is situated west of the village.

The Přesypy u Rokytna Nature Reserve is a unique area of sand dunes overgrown with pine forest. With an area of 7 hectares (17 acres), it is considered to be the largest Czech desert.

== History ==
The first written mention of Rokytno is from 1436. During the 18th century, the village, together with Chvojenec and Býšť, was the centre of persecuted religious sect of Deists called blouznivci. During the industrialisation at the turn of the 19th and 20th centuries, two brickyards were built here.

The village of Drahoš was founded in 1782. It was settled by German-speaking farmers from the Province of Silesia.

== Demographics ==
Historical population

Year	Pop.	±%
1869	964	—
1880	963	−0.1%
1890	907	−5.8%
1900	983	+8.4%
1910	992	+0.9%

Year	Pop.	±%
1921	995	+0.3%
1930	1,006	+1.1%
1950	799	−20.6%
1961	767	−4.0%
1970	703	−8.3%

Year	Pop.	±%
1980	656	−6.7%
1991	693	+5.6%
2001	734	+5.9%
2011	813	+10.8%
2021	875	+7.6%

Source: Censuses

== Transport ==
The D35 motorway runs through the municipality.

== Sights ==
The only protected cultural monument in the municipality is a stone road bridge dating from 1834.
