= Čížečku, čížečku =

Czech children's folk song

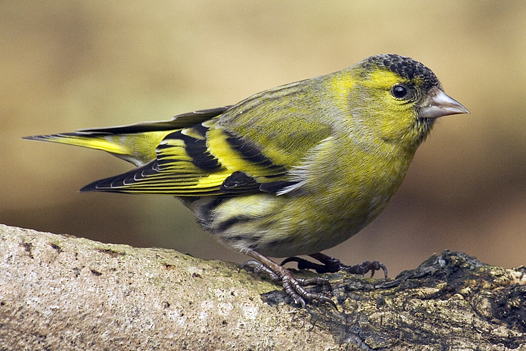
This little birdie knows everything about the poppies

Čížečku, čížečku ("Siskin, o Little Siskin") is a traditional Czech children's work song and a singing game which was performed in the past as an annual custom supposed to enhance the yield of poppy.

The song is a chain of verses of the same pattern of call and response:

Call:
Siskin, o little Siskin, a little birdie,
Tell me o Siskin how the poppy is sown

Response:
This is how the poppies are sown (repeated, with variations)

In Czech:

Čížečku, čížečku, ptáčku maličký,
pověz mi čížečku, jak sejou mák?

Aj tak, tak sejou mák, aj tak, tak sejou mák,
aj tak, tak sejou mák, tak sejou mák.

The call/response is repeated, with the verb "sowed" being replaced with the other stages of growing, harvesting and processing the poppies:

- Grows
- Blossoms
- Harvested
- Is milled (or "crushed")
- Is eaten

With every response the children are supposed to perform an action of how exactly the poppy is sown, grown, eaten, etc. It may also be arranged in the form of a dance.

There is a similar Russian children's folk question-answer song-game about handling poppies.

Professor S.P.Orlov wrote that this song/game may be found among all Slavic peoples. In addition to Czech version, he also gives records of Polish several Ukrainian , as well as a Russian and a Sebisn ones.

== See also ==
- Chizhik-Pyzhik
