= First Engineer Bridge =

Bridge in Saint Petersburg, Russia

Coordinates: 59.9417°N 30.3378°E

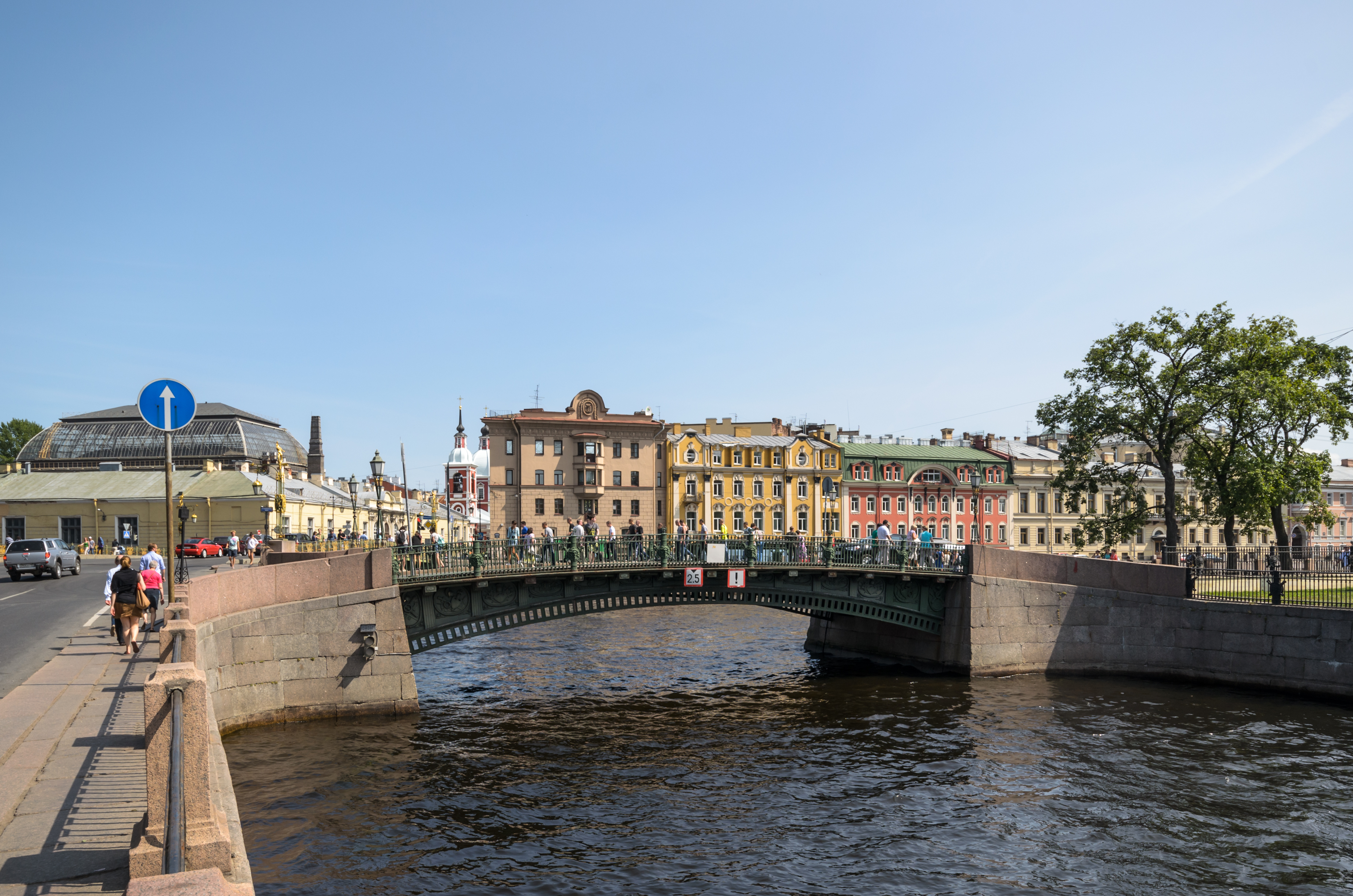
First Engineer Bridge in St. Petersburg.

The First Engineer Bridge (Russian: Первый Инженерный мост, Pervy Inzhenerny most) is one of several Russian bridges that span the Moika River in Saint Petersburg. The bridge is one of a group of four bridges located near the Mars Field, and opposite the main entrance to the Summer Garden, spanning the Moika River, the Fontanka River, and the Swan Canal in the historic center of the city. The First Engineer Bridge is one of the most decorative of Saint Petersburg's more than 500 bridges.

The original small wooden bridge, called the Summer Bridge and rumored to have been designed by the architect Bartolomeo Rastrelli, was built in the 1760s. This bridge was replaced with the current cast-iron bridge, in 1824-1825, and renamed the First Engineer Bridge, in 1829, after the nearby Engineers' Castle (originally called St Michael's or Mikhailovsky Castle).

Engineer Pierre-Dominique Bazaine (1786-1838) (Пётр Петрович Базен) designed and constructed the bridge in a similar fashion to the Big Stables Bridge (Bolshoy Konyushenny Bridge), a bridge located further west on the Moika River, using pre-fabricated hollow wedges. Bazaine also managed to reduce the use of expensive cast-iron in the bridge's construction to one-third of the total mass of the bridge, by innovatively designing the sidewalks with the use of special bracket supports.

The siding is decorated in Doric style by architect I.I. "Joseph" Charlemagne. The beams have a curved and perforated appearance, and the bridge's rectangular orifices are bordered with flat frames, giving the bridge an appearance of lightness and transparency. The bridge's sidewalk tiles were designed as a cornice and are supported by rich ornamental bracket figures.

Intricately inscribed plaques with grooves extend from the figures on frieze planes, in the style of Doric triglyph coverings. The triglyphs cover the joints of the side plaques. Cast-iron arches span closely behind. The railings, also designed by Charlemagne, comprise several sections of short pilums, placed between bouquets of decorations and inscriptions of round shields, with bas-relief images of the heads of Medusa, with the Gorgon's snaky locks for hair.

In 1994, a small bronze statue of Chizhik-Pyzhik was installed on a ledge in the embankment, opposite the Imperial School of Jurisprudence near the First Engineer Bridge. The statue has since been repeatedly stolen.

== See also ==
- Bridges in Saint Petersburg
- List of bridges in Saint Petersburg
