= Dobrynya Nikitich (opera) =

Dobrynya Nikitich (Op. 22) is a 1901 opera by Aleksandr Grechaninov. It is described as a "Opera-Legend" based on the bogatyr Dobrynya Nikitich. The opera opened at the Bolshoi Theatre on October 14, 1903, with Fyodor Chaliapin in the lead.

== Recordings ==
Excerpts were recorded by the Leningrad Radio Choir and Russian balalaika orchestra 'Vasiliy Andreev' under Georgy Doniyakh in 1959, with Viktor Morozov (bass) Matvej Gavrilkin (tenor) Aleksandra Meshcheryakova (mezzo-soprano) and Lyudmila Grudina (mezzo-soprano).

== See also ==
- Dobrynya Nikitich (1818) by Aleksandr Shakhovskoi
