= The Eagle (1925 film) =

1925 film

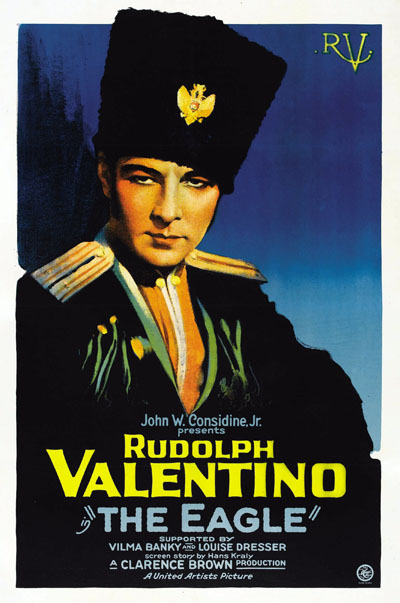
- Theatrical release poster
- Directed by: Clarence Brown
- Written by: Hans Kraly; George Marion Jr.
- Based on: Dubrovsky by Alexander Pushkin
- Produced by: John W. Considine Jr. Joseph M. Schenck
- Starring: Rudolph Valentino; Vilma Bánky; Louise Dresser
- Cinematography: George Barnes; Dev Jennings (Second Unit, as J. Devereaux Jennings)
- Edited by: Hal C. Kern
- Music by: Michael Hoffman; Carl Davis; Lee Erwin
- Production company: Art Finance Corporation
- Distributed by: United Artists
- Release date: November 8, 1925 (USA)
- Running time: 80 minutes
- Country: United States
- Language: Silent (English intertitles)

The Eagle

The Eagle is a 1925 American silent adventure film directed by Clarence Brown and starring Rudolph Valentino, Vilma Bánky, and Louise Dresser. Based loosely on Alexander Pushkin's posthumously published 1841 novel Dubrovsky, the film is set in imperial Russia and follows a disgraced lieutenant who becomes a masked outlaw known as the Black Eagle. Black Eagle does not exist in the novel and was inspired by the performance of Douglas Fairbanks as Zorro in The Mark of Zorro. Produced by United Artists, The Eagle was one of Valentino's most successful late-career films, showcasing his shift from exotic romantic roles to swashbuckling adventure.

== Plot ==
Vladimir Dubrovsky, a Lieutenant serving in the Imperial Guard of the Russian army, comes to the notice of the Czarina when he rescues Mascha, a beautiful young lady, and her aunt trapped in a runaway stagecoach. He is delighted when the Czarina offers to make him a general, but horrified when she tries to seduce him. He flees and the Czarina puts a price on his head.

Soon afterwards, he receives a letter from his father informing him that the evil nobleman Kyrilla Troekouroff has taken over his lands and is terrorizing the countryside. Hurrying home, Vladimir learns that his father has died. Vowing to avenge his father and help the victimized peasantry, he adopts a black mask and becomes the Black Eagle, a Robin Hood figure. Discovering that Kyrilla is Mascha's father, he takes the place of a tutor who has been sent for from France, but not previously seen by anyone in the household. Vladimir is thus able to become part of Kyrilla's household.

As Vladimir's love for Mascha grows, he becomes more and more reluctant to continue seeking revenge against her father, and the two eventually flee the Troekouroff estate. Vladimir is captured by the Czarina's men, but the Czarina, once determined to have him executed, has a last-minute change of heart, and she allows Vladimir, given a new French name, and Mascha to leave Russia for Paris.

== Cast ==
- Rudolph Valentino as Lt. Vladimir Dubrovsky
- Vilma Bánky as Miss Mascha Troekouroff
- Louise Dresser as The Czarina, Catherine 2nd
- Albert Conti as Captain Kuschka
- James A. Marcus as Kyrilla Troekouroff
- George Nichols as Judge
- Carrie Clark Ward as Aunt Aurelia
- Spottiswoode Aitken as Dubrovsky's Father (uncredited)
- Agostino Borgato as Priest (uncredited)
- Mario Carillo as Marcel Le Blanc, French Tutor (uncredited)
- Gary Cooper as Masked Cossack (uncredited)
- Jean De Briac as Small Role (uncredited)
- Otto Hoffman as Man Who Gets Purse Stolen (uncredited)
- Eric Mayne as Official Asking for Signature (uncredited)
- Russell Simpson as The Eagle's Lieutenant (uncredited)
- Mack Swain as Innkeeper (uncredited)
- Gustav von Seyffertitz as Court Servant at Dinner (uncredited)

== Reception ==
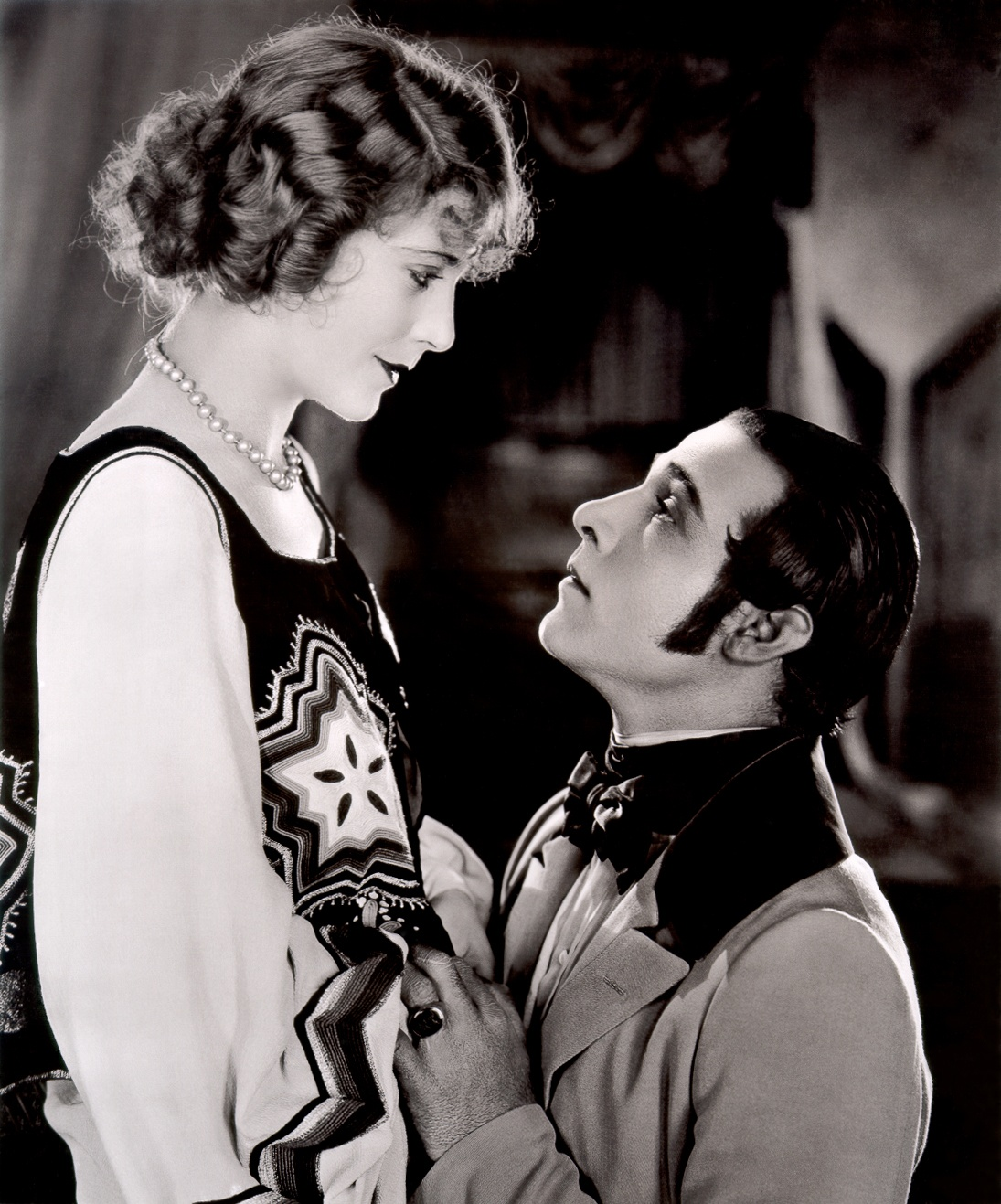
Vilma Bánky and Valentino in The Eagle

Valentino's last few films had not been particularly well received, but The Eagle proved a strong comeback for him, gaining good reviews from the critics and a success at the box office.

In a review for Midweek Pictorial, Herbert Cooker wrote: "Rather than the tempestuous lover, the smoldering volcano of flesh and blood, there is a mischievous Valentino, suave and smiling. … In spite of the limitation to the story, Rudolph Valentino does exceedingly fine work and is welcome to the screen after far too long an absence. He handles hos subtle moments pleasantly, and his one fiery spurt is magnificently done."

The Eagle is remembered for its extended tracking shot of the food-laden table in the banquet scene.

In 2001, the film was nominated by the American Film Institute for AFI's 100 Years...100 Thrills.

== Preservation ==
Prints of The Eagle currently exist in the film holdings of EmGee Film Library and in private film collections.

== In pop culture ==
Clips of the film are used in the music video for Queen and David Bowie's song "Under Pressure".

== See also ==
- List of American films of 1925
- The Vigilantes Are Coming
- The Black Eagle
