= Ivan Ivanovich Petrov =

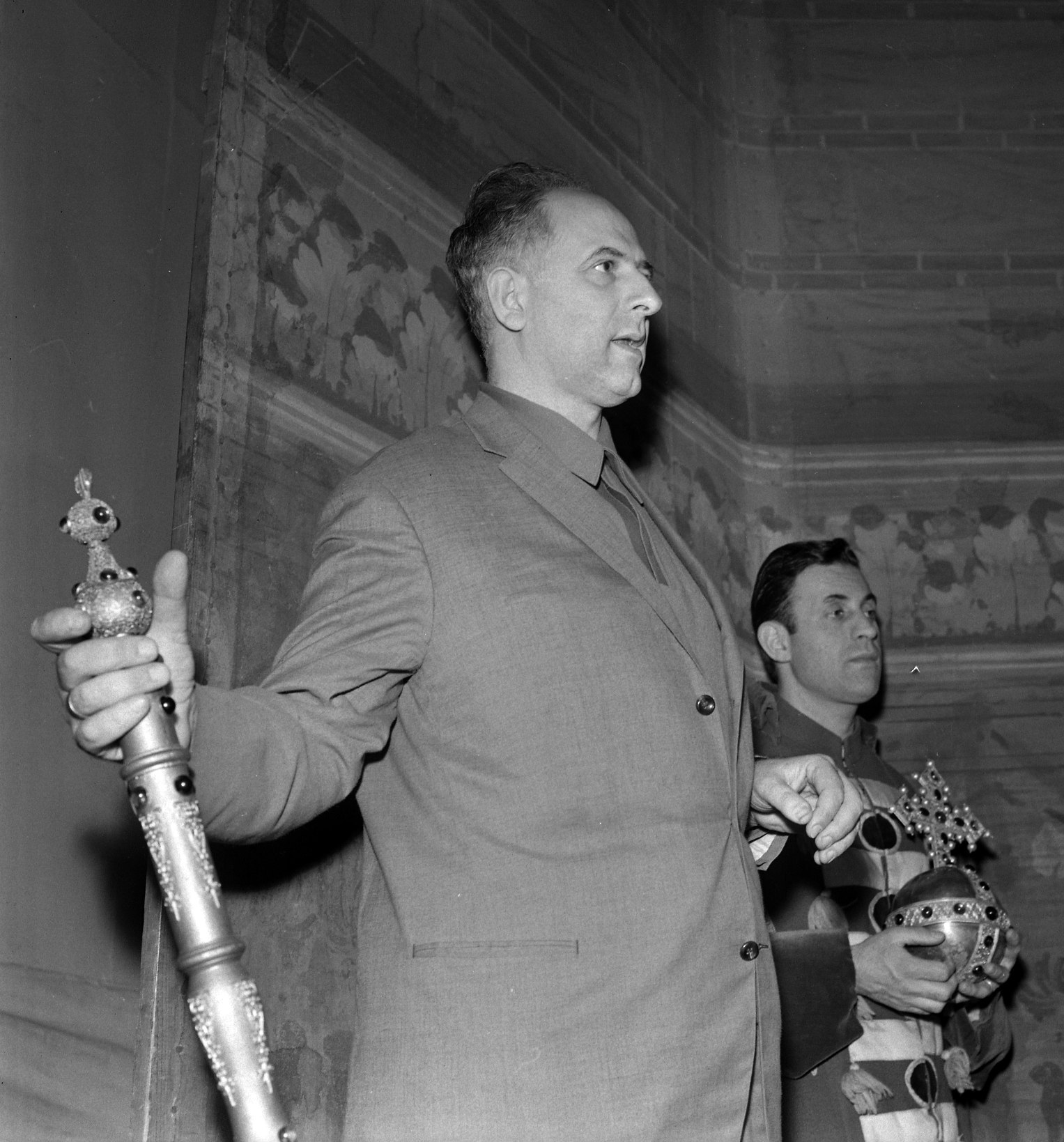

Background information
- Born: 29 February 1920; Irkutsk
- Died: 26 December 2003 (aged 83) Moscow
- Genres: opera
- Instrument: bass voice

Ivan Ivanovich Petrov (Russian: Иван Иванович Петров; 29 February 1920 – 26 December 2003) was a Soviet and Russian bass opera singer. People's Artist of the USSR (1959).

Born Ivan Krauze (Краузе), the family took the name Petrov in 1936 after moving from Siberia to Moscow due to the suspicions of anyone with a German surname. He entered the Bolshoi Theatre in 1942 after three years with the Moscow Philharmonic spent traveling giving concerts for the troops. He continued singing until 1970 when diabetes began to affect his voice, then concentrated on teaching.

His repertoire included both Russian and Western works, which in Russia were also usually sung in Russian. He recorded for the conductors Kiril Kondrashin, Mark Ermler, Boris Khaykin, Mikhail Zhukov, Vladimir Fedoseyev, Samuil Samosud, Nikolai Golovanov and Vassili Nebolsin.
