= Chizhik-Pyzhik =

Russian comic folk song

"Chizhyk-Pyzhik" (Russian: Чи́жик-Пы́жик) is a Russian comic folk song.

== Text and origin ==
Original

Чижик-пыжик, где ты был?
На Фонтанке водку пил.
Выпил рюмку, выпил две –
Закружилось в голове.

Transliteration

Chizhik-Pyzhik, gd^{j}e ty byl?
Na fontank^{j}e vodku pil.
Vypil r^{j}umku, vypil dv^{j}e –
Zakruzhilos^{j} v golov^{j}e.

Translation

– Siskin-piskin, where were you?
– On the Fontanka drinking vodka!
I drank one glass, I drank two.
Then my head began to spin!

The origin of the song in unclear. According to one urban legend, the rhyme refers to the students of the Imperial School of Jurisprudence, who frequented a pub belonging to the merchant Nefedov on the Fontanka Quay in Saint Petersburg. The school was founded by Duke Peter of Oldenburg in the nearby house number 6. The students of the college wore uniforms with yellow and green colours, which resembled the colours of the bird called siskin (Russian: чиж, romanized: chizh; hypocoristic Russian: чижик, romanized: chizhik, and hats from fur of young reindeer (Russian: пыжик, romanized: pyzhik). Because of that, they were nicknamed Chizhiks-Pyzhiks.

== Melody ==
From Rappaport 2012.

Its extremely simple melody is suitable for teaching small children to play piano (with a more suitable nursery rhyme text).

Several Russian classical composers, including Dmitri Shostakovich, Sergei Prokofiev, Isaak Dunayevsky and Nikolai Rimsky-Korsakov, were inspired by "Chizhik-Pyzhik".

== Statue ==
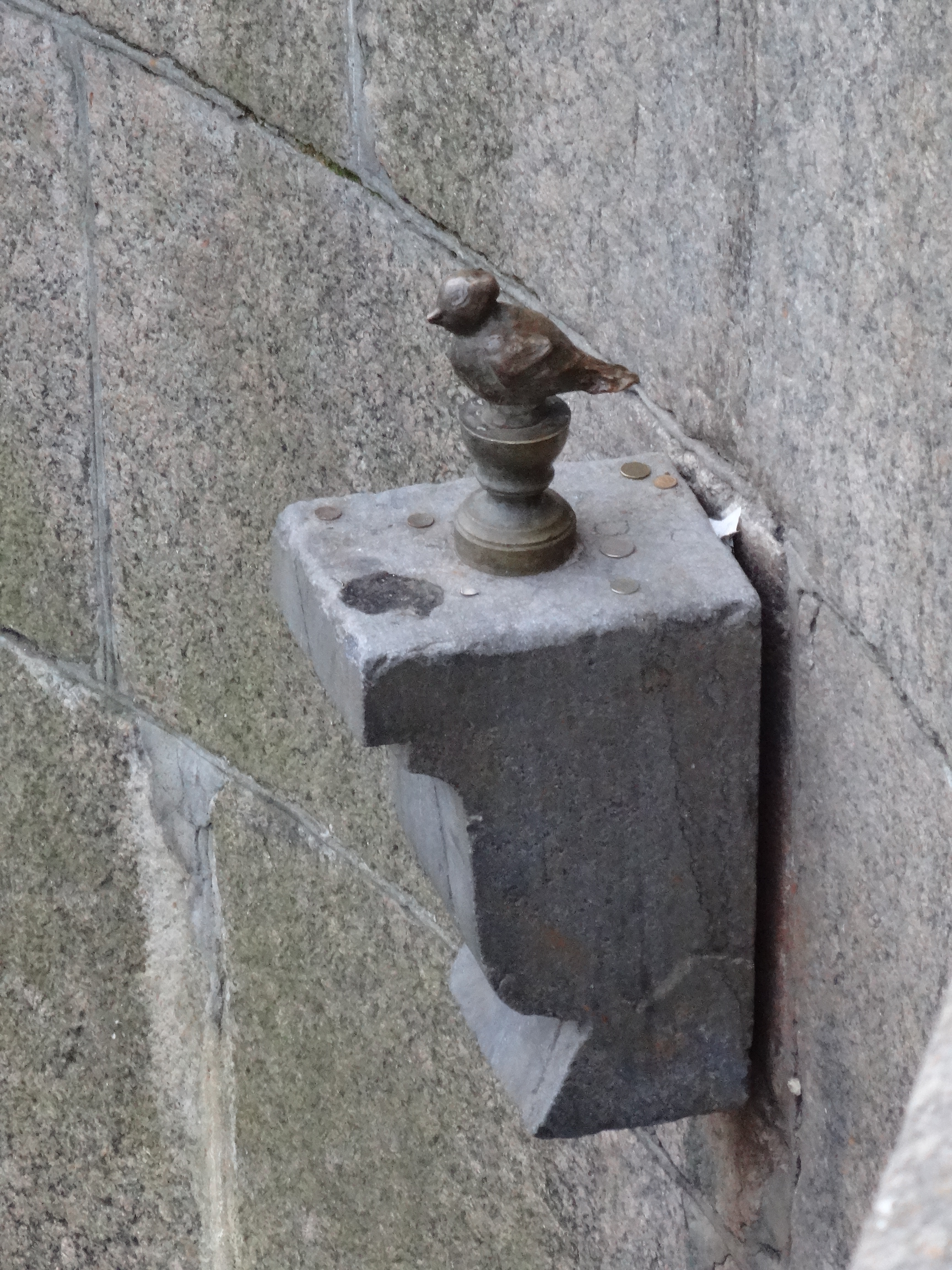
Statue of Chizhik-Pyzhik near the First Engineer Bridge

In 1994 in Saint Petersburg, one of the city's 1990s' yearly festivals of satire and humor Golden Ostap was held, bearing the name of a most popular main character of the 20 century Russian language Soviet humorous / satirical prose Ostap Bender, an ingenious conman mastermind from two filmed novels by Ilya Ilf and Yevgeny Petrov The Twelve Chairs and The Little Golden Calf. The festival attracted leading Russian humorous authors and comedians and marked its presence in the city by public events including installation of pieces of public art. These over the years included the statue of Ostap Bender next to Arts Square, the memorial plaque to The Nose from Nikolai Gogol's eponymous story and the little siskin statue on the Fontanka, the latter suggested by a Saint Petersburg-born writer known since 1960s Andrei Bitov. These moves were supported by the municipal authorities of Saint Petersburg, and a bronze statue of Chizhik-Pyzhik was installed just opposite the former School of Jurisprudence. The statue perches on a ledge in the embankment, in the proximity of the First Engineer Bridge.

The statue was designed by Georgian screenwriter and director Revaz Gabriadze, and it is one of the smallest statues in Saint Petersburg. Its height is 11 centimetres and weighs almost 5 kilograms. The statue was stolen several times; the local museum has reportedly several copies of the statue for replacement.

== See also ==
- Čížečku, čížečku, a Czech children's song
