= Dubrovsky (film) =

- Russian: Дубровский
- Directed by: Aleksandr Ivanovsky
- Written by: Aleksandr Ivanovsky
- Based on: Dubrovsky by Alexander Pushkin
- Produced by: G. Kharlamov
- Starring: Boris Livanov; Nikolay Monakhov; Galina Grigoreva; Vladimir Gardin; Mikhail Tarkhanov
- Cinematography: Aleksandr Sigaev
- Music by: Andrei Pashchenko
- Release date: 1936
- Country: Soviet Union
- Language: Russian

Dubrovsky (Russian: Дубровский) is a 1936 Soviet drama film directed by Aleksandr Ivanovsky.

The film is based on the posthumously published 1841 eponymous novel by Alexander Pushkin.

== Plot ==
The wealthy and capricious Russian nobleman, Kirila Petrovich Troekurov, is known for his cruel pranks and domineering nature, which make him feared by provincial officials and revered by his neighbors. Despite his temperamental character, Troekurov maintains a friendship with his neighbor and former comrade-in-arms, the impoverished but principled nobleman Andrey Gavrilovich Dubrovsky. Troekurov's sadistic tendencies often manifest in dangerous jokes, such as locking guests in a room with a hungry bear without warning.

A feud arises between Troekurov and Dubrovsky following an incident involving an insolent servant of Troekurov. Exploiting his influence, Troekurov bribes the provincial court to seize Dubrovsky’s estate, Kistenevka. The elder Dubrovsky, devastated by this injustice, loses his sanity in the courtroom. His son, Vladimir Dubrovsky, a guards officer in St. Petersburg, resigns from service and rushes to his ailing father, who soon dies. Enraged, Vladimir sets fire to Kistenevka, destroying the estate along with the judicial officials sent to finalize the transfer of ownership.

Vladimir becomes a Robin Hood-like outlaw, terrorizing corrupt landowners but sparing Troekurov’s properties. Disguising himself as a French tutor named Monsieur Desforges, Dubrovsky infiltrates Troekurov’s household, where he falls in love with Troekurov's daughter, Masha, and wins her affection.

Troekurov, however, arranges for 17-year-old Masha to marry the elderly Prince Vereisky against her will. Vladimir attempts to prevent the marriage, but his efforts are in vain. After the wedding, he intercepts the bridal procession, ambushing Vereisky’s carriage with his armed men. During the confrontation, Vereisky wounds Dubrovsky, who offers to rescue Masha. She declines, citing her vows.

In the film’s altered ending, Vladimir Dubrovsky dies in battle against government forces. His surviving bandits, seeking revenge, storm Troekurov’s estate and execute him.

== Cast ==
- Boris Livanov as Vladimir Dubrovsky
- Nikolay Monakhov as Kirill Petrovich Troekurov
- Galina Grigoreva as Marya Kirilovna Troyekurova
- Vladimir Gardin as Prince Vereysky
- Mikhail Tarkhanov as Spitsin
- Pavel Volkov as Arkhip
- Stepan Kayukov as Colonel
- Konstantin Sorokin as Paramoshka
- Iosif Samarin-Elsky as Dubrovsky's father
