= Georgy Doniyakh =

Soviet conductor (1914–1976)

Georgy Anatolevich Doniyakh (Дониях Георгий Анатольевич, 1914–1976) was a Soviet conductor. He graduated from the Leningrad Conservatory in 1943, and later became director of the Orchestra of the Uzbek SSR. He was the Chief Conductor of the Maly Opera Theatre, and would have been the conductor of Shostakovich's Lady Macbeth of Mtsensk had it been produced according to schedule. He was also conductor of the Andreyev Folk Orchestra.

== Discography ==
- Dobrynya Nikitich, excerpts – Leningrad Radio Choir and Russian balalaika orchestra Vasiliy Andreev, 1959
