= Dubrowsky =

1959 film

- Directed by: William Dieterle
- Starring: John Forsythe; Rosanna Schiaffino
- Cinematography: Aldo Giordani
- Music by: Carlo Rustichelli
- Release date: 1959
- Countries: FPR Yugoslavia; Italy
- Languages: Italian; English

Dubrowsky (Italian: Il vendicatore) is a 1959 Italian - Yugoslav historical drama film directed by William Dieterle. It is based on the posthumously published 1841 novel Dubrovsky by Alexander Pushkin.

== Plot ==
Russia in 1831: two families, the Dubrowskys and the Petrovichs, have been at loggerheads with each other ever since the nouveau riche Kirila Petrovich once deprived old Dubrowsky of large parts of his property. Dubrowsky's son Vladimir, called Wladja, does not want to submit to this fraud and fights for his rights with all means, especially since he accuses Petrovich of being complicit in his father's death. Eventually he puts himself at the head of other betrayed, especially peasants, who have also been harmed, and the generally disenfranchised.

The young Dubrowsky has to realize how much the people are starving and suffering under the bondage of serfdom and sets himself up as the avenger of the dispossessed by taking it from the rich and giving it to the poor, in the tradition of Robin Hood. In the fight against Petrovich's reign of terror of money, Vladja's love intervenes one day, because the beautiful Masha is, of all people, the daughter of his worst adversary, the landowner Kirila.

== Cast ==
- John Forsythe as Vladja Dubrowski
- Rosanna Schiaffino as Masha Petrovieh
- Paul Dahlke as Kirila Petrovich
- William Dieterle as Kirila Petrowitsch
- Nerio Bernardi as Governor Fürst Werejski
- Guido Celano as Gerichtsvorsitzender
- Giulio Donnini as Patnutic
- Johanna Hofer as Maria Jegorowna
- Bata Živojinović as Russian soldier
