= Imperial School of Jurisprudence =

School for boys in Saint Petersburg, Russia

Coordinates: 59.9459°N 30.3384°E

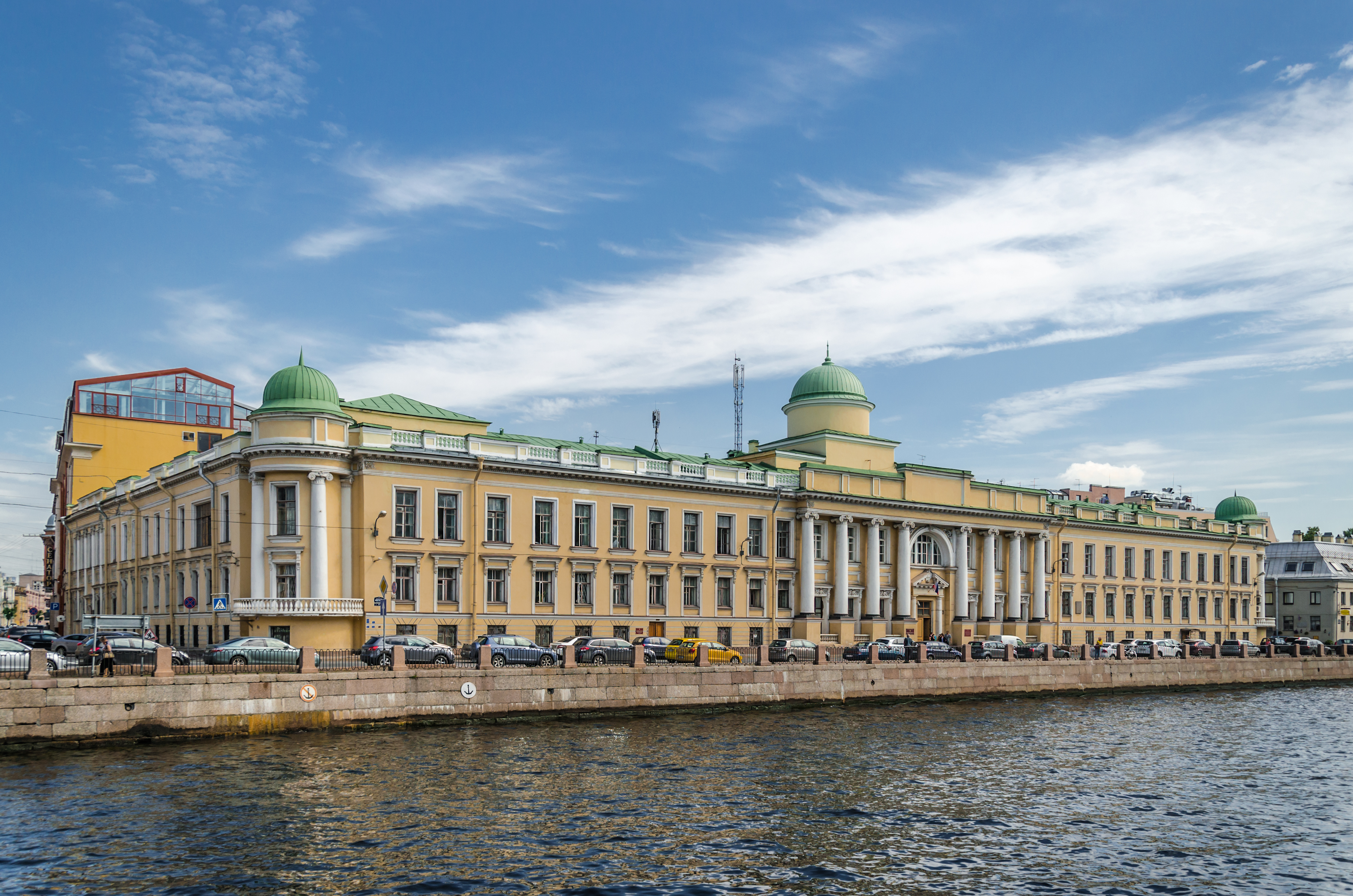
Modern view of the school building.

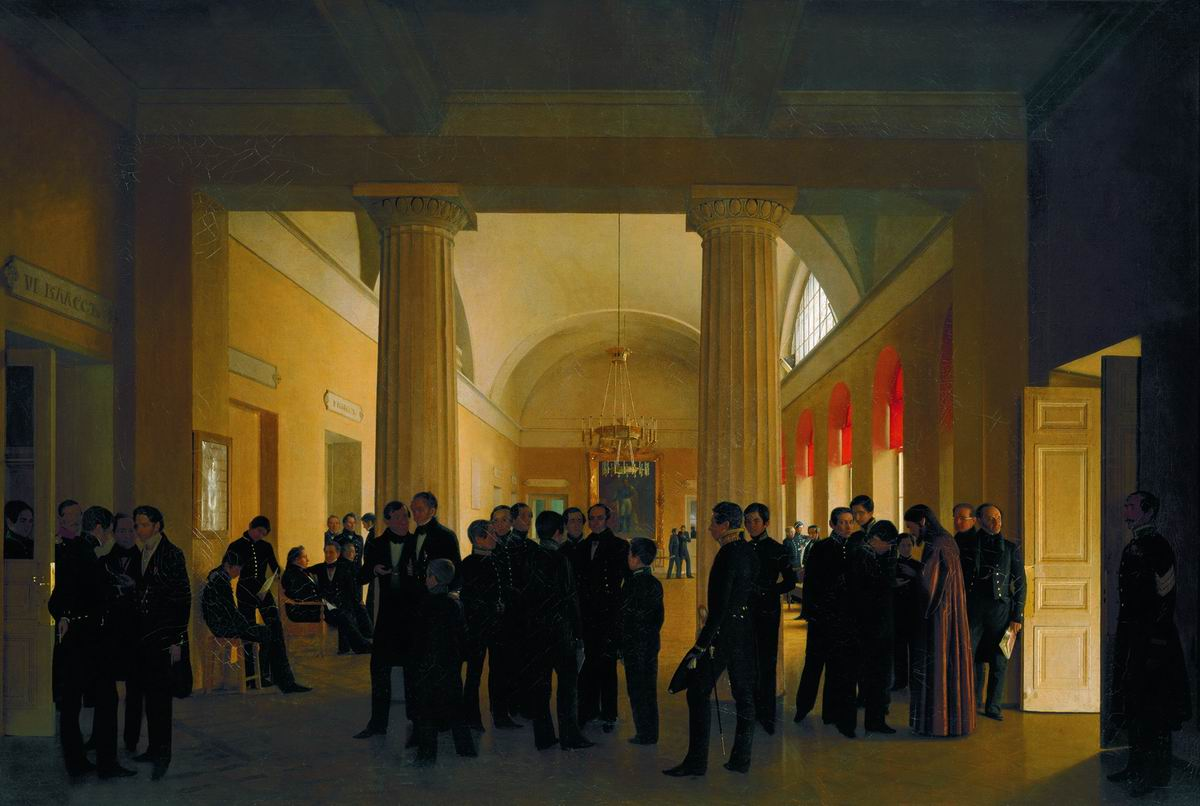
Hall of the School of Jurisprudence, an 1840 portrait by Sergey Zaryanko

The Imperial School of Jurisprudence (Russian: Императорское училище правоведения, romanized: Impyeratorskoye uchilichshye pravovyedyeniya) was, along with the Page Corps, a school for boys in Saint Petersburg, the capital of the Russian Empire.

The school for would-be imperial administrators was founded by Duke Peter of Oldenburg in 1835. The classes were accommodated in six buildings along the Fontanka Quay. After the October Revolution of 1917, the school was disbanded, but its memory survives in the nursery rhyme about Chizhik-Pyzhik.

Among the instructors were lawyers of Imperial Russia, such as Anatoly Koni and Włodzimierz Spasowicz. Boys studied in the school for six or seven years. The graduates of the School of Jurisprudence include Ivan Aksakov, Aleksey Apukhtin, Konstantin Pobedonostsev, Alexander Serov, Vladimir Stasov, Vladimir Dmitrievich Nabokov, Pyotr Ilyich Tchaikovsky and his younger brother Modest Ilyich Tchaikovsky.

== Sources ==
- Соболевский В. И. Императорское училище правоведения в 1885–1910 годах. St. Petersburg, 1910.
