= Dubrovsky (opera) =

1895 opera by Eduard Nápravník

- Opera by Eduard Nápravník
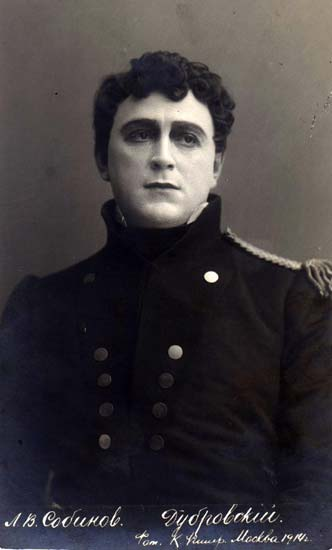
- Leonid Sobinov as Vladimir Dubrovsky, Moscow
- Native title: Russian: Дубровский
- Librettist: Modest Ilyich Tchaikovsky
- Language: Russian
- Based on: Dubrovsky by Alexander Pushkin
- Premiere: 15 January 1895; Mariinsky Theatre, Saint Petersburg

Dubrovsky (Russian: Дубровский) is an opera in four acts (5 scenes), Op. 58, by Eduard Nápravník, to a Russian libretto by Modest Ilyich Tchaikovsky after the novel of the same title (1832) by Alexander Pushkin.

== Creation and performance history ==
Eduard Nápravník, Russia's leading conductor, who handled the musical department at the Mariinsky Theater in St Petersburg, composed four of his own operas, some of them inspired by Pyotr Ilyich Tchaikovsky whom Nápravník admired very much. For Dubrovsky he asked Modest Tchaikovsky to write a libretto after Alexander Pushkin, as Modest had done for his brother Pyotr (the best-known example of this is The Queen of Spades). The opera was completed in 1894 and successfully staged on January 15 (OS January 3) 1895, at the Mariinsky Theatre, St Petersburg, conducted by the composer.

A year later (December 26, 1895) it was staged at the Bolshoi Theatre in Moscow. Around this time, opera became a large part of the repertoire of the Russian theatrical scene. Only in 1897 there were seven premieres of Dubrovsky in different Russian towns: in Yekaterinoslavl, Kiev, Nizhny Novgorod, Odessa, Poltava, Saratov and Yalta. It was also performed abroad: in Prague in (1896), Leipzig in (1897), and Plzeň and Brno in (1898).

In the 20th century the opera was performed less frequently, but nevertheless it remained in the repertoire of many theatres. It continued to enjoy success in 20th century Soviet Russia. The main role of Vladimir Dubrovsky was performed by Nikolai Figner, Leonid Sobinov, Sergei Lemeshev, and Ivan Kozlovsky, as well as various others. The vocal score was reprinted in Moscow in 1972.

An abridged version of the opera was broadcast on Soviet television in 1961, featuring Sergei Lemeshev, Vera Kudryavtseva, Georgy Dudarev, Alexei Ivanov and the Moscow Academic Musical Theatre under the direction of Peter Slavinsky.

On 23 November 2016 a concert version of the opera (albeit with some sizable cuts) was presented at The Mariinsky Theatre, St. Petersburg, Russia.

== Roles ==
- Andrey Dubrovsky – 1st bass
- Vladimir, his son – 1st tenor
- Cyril Petrovich Troekurov – 1st baritone
- Masha, his daughter – 1st soprano
- Prince Vereyskiy – 1st bass
- District police officer – 2nd baritone
- Assessor – 2nd bass
- Deforzh, Frenchman – tutor – 2nd tenor
- Shabashkin, clerk – 2nd tenor
- Yegorovna – 1st mezzo-soprano
- Arkhip – Dubrovsky’s serf – 2nd bass
- Grishka – Dubrovsky’s serf – 2nd tenor
- Anton – Dubrovsky’s serf – 2nd baritone
- Tanya, Troekurov’s maid – 2nd soprano
- The 1st lady – 2nd soprano
- The 2nd lady – 2nd alto

== Plot ==
Vladimir Dubrovsky is a young nobleman whose land is confiscated by greedy and powerful aristocrat Kiril Petrovitch Troekurov. Determined to get justice one way or another, Dubrovsky gathers together a band of serfs and goes on a rampage like another Robin Hood, stealing from the rich and giving to the poor. Along the way, Dubrovsky falls in love with Masha, Troekurov’s daughter, and foolishly lets his guard down, with tragic results.

The libretto does not follow Pushkin's original closely. At the end of the opera, the police, who want Vladimir for arson, are close on his heels. He gets the opportunity to sing a long duet with Masha before being shot. Masha's father enters to find his now insane daughter with Dubrovsky's body.

In the opera, Nápravník played down the social aspect underscoring the love story of Dubrovsky and the daughter of his sworn enemy. Overall, however, Nápravník stayed true to Pushkin's romantic style.

== Sound and music samples ==
The first page of Recitative and Romance of Vladimir Dubrovsky, the vocal score

- At this link you can listen to the voice of Ivan Kozlovsky: Vladimir Dubrovsky's Recitative and Romance О дай мне забвенье - O dai mne zabvenye (O give me oblivion) from the opera Dubrovsky by Eduard Napravnik. Recorded in 1952 (mp3 file). Also at: and
