= Modest Ilyich Tchaikovsky =

Russian writer

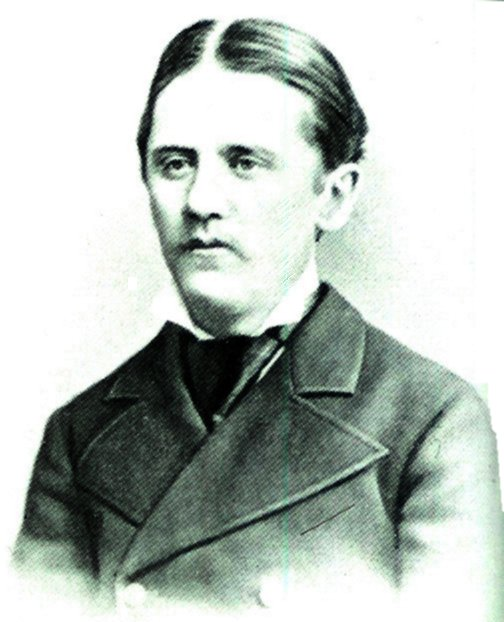
Modest Ilyich Tchaikovsky Russian Dramatist Born 13 May 1850 Deceased 15 January 1916 Nationality Russian Romantic Partner(s) Nikolay Konradi Siblings Pyotr Tchaikovsky, Alexandra Davydova (Tchaikovsky), Anatoly Tchaikovsky, Ippolit Tchaikovsky, Nikolay Tchaikovsky Parents Ilya Petrovich Tchaikovsky, Aleksandra Andreyevna d'Assier

Modest Ilyich Tchaikovsky (Russian: Моде́ст Ильи́ч Чайко́вский; 13 May [O.S. 1 May] 1850–15 January [O.S. 2 January] 1916) was a Russian dramatist, opera librettist and translator.

== Early life ==
Modest Ilyich was born in Alapayevsk, Verkhotursky Uyezd, Perm Governorate, the younger brother of the composer Pyotr Ilyich Tchaikovsky. He graduated from the Imperial School of Jurisprudence with a degree in law. In 1876, Modest became the tutor to a deaf-mute boy Nikolay ("Kolya") Germanovich Konradi (Russian: Николай Германович Конради)(1868–1922) and, using a special teaching method, helped him to talk, write, and read. In his still unpublished autobiography, broadly quoted by Alexander Poznansky, Modest Ilyich Tchaikovsky mentions his and his brother's homosexuality.

== Career ==
Modest chose to dedicate his entire life to literature and music. He wrote plays, translated sonnets by Shakespeare into Russian and wrote librettos for operas by his brother Pyotr, as well as for other composers such as Eduard Nápravník, Arseny Koreshchenko, Anton Arensky and Sergei Rachmaninoff. Being the nearest friend of his brother, he became his first biographer, and also the founder of the Tchaikovsky Museum in Klin.

== Plays ==
- Predrassudki (Предрассудки – Prejudices)
- Simfoniya (Симфония – Symphony)
- Den' v Peterburge (День в Петербурге – A Day in St Petersburg)

== Opera libretti ==
- Pyotr Ilyich Tchaikovsky: The Queen of Spades (Пиковая дама - Pikovaya dama), Op. 68, 1890. Premiered: 19 December [O.S. 7 December] 1890, St Petersburg
- Tchaikovsky: Iolanta (Иоланта – Iolanta), Op. 69, 1891, based on the Danish play Kong Renés Datter (King René’s Daughter) by Henrik Hertz, translated by Fyodor Miller and adapted by Vladimir Rafailovich Zotov. Premiered: 1892, Mariinsky Theatre, St Petersburg.
- Eduard Nápravník: Dubrovsky (Дубровский). Premiered: 15 January [O.S. 3 January] 1895, at the Mariinsky Theatre, St Petersburg.
- Arseny Koreshchenko: Ledyanoy dom (Ледяной дом). Premiered: 20 November [O.S. 7 November] 1900, Moscow.
- Anton Arensky: Nal' i Damayanty (Наль и Дамаянти), after the epos Mahabharata. Premiered: 22 January [O.S. 9 January] 1904, Moscow.
- Sergei Rachmaninoff: Francesca da Rimini (Франческа да Римини), Op. 25, 1904, after the story of the heroine Francesca da Rimini from the fifth canto of Dante's epic poem Inferno (the first part of The Divine Comedy). Premiered: 24 January [O.S. 11 January] 1906, Bolshoi Theatre, Moscow.

== Bibliography ==
- Tchaikovsky, Modest: The Life And Letters of Peter Ilich Tchaikovsky, University Press of the Pacific (2004) ISBN 1-4102-1612-8
