= Eduard Nápravník =

Czech conductor and composer (1839–1916)

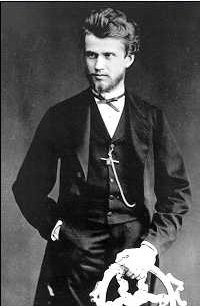
Eduard Nápravník

Eduard Francevič Nápravník (Russian: Эдуард Францевич Направник, romanized: Eduard Frantsevich Napravnik; 24 August [O.S. 12 August] 1839 – 23 November [O.S. 10 November] 1916) was a Czech conductor and composer. Nápravník settled in Russian Empire and is best known for his leading role in Russian musical life as the principal conductor of the Imperial Mariinsky Theatre in Saint Petersburg for many decades. In that capacity, he conducted the premieres of many operas by Russian composers, including those by Mussorgsky, Tchaikovsky and Rimsky-Korsakov.

== Biography ==
Nápravník was born in Býšť, Bohemia, in 1839. His studies of music were precariously uneven as a child, being the son of a poor teacher. Orphaned in 1853 at the age of 14, he first worked as a local church organist. In 1854 he entered the Prague Organ School, where he studied under Jan Bedřich Kittl and others, eventually becoming an assistant teacher as Kittl's generosity allowed him to continue his studies. In 1861, he worked in Russia for the first time as conductor of the private orchestra of Prince Yusupov in St. Petersburg.

Nápravník became organist and assistant conductor at the Imperial theatres in 1863, second conductor in 1867, and chief conductor, succeeding Liadov, in 1869, holding the post until his death. He led the first performances of Boris Godunov in 1874, conducted five operas by Pyotr Ilyich Tchaikovsky, including The Maid of Orleans, Mazepa and The Queen of Spades, and five by Nikolai Rimsky-Korsakov, including May Night, The Snow Maiden and Christmas Eve. He also conducted concerts of the Russian Musical Society. In 1914, after a productive career in the service of Russian opera, he was forced to retire due to ill health.

In November 1875, Nápravník conducted the first performance in Russia of Tchaikovsky's First Piano Concerto with Gustav Kross as soloist (whose playing was described by the composer as "an atrocious cacophony"). Nápravník is also well known for leading the second — and overwhelmingly persuasive — performance of Tchaikovsky's Pathétique symphony on 6/18 November 1893, twelve days after the composer's death. The premiere, under the composer's baton, had not fared so well, partly due to the audience's and the orchestra's unfamiliarity with a work that contained so many novelties, compositionally speaking, and partly due to Tchaikovsky's conducting (although Rimsky protested after that second performance, in his autobiography Moya Muzikalnaya Zhizn' [My Musical Life], that the first performance had also gone well under the baton of its creator). Under Nápravník's baton, however, and under the solemn influence of Tchaikovsky's sudden passing, the work was seen as a masterpiece with an overwhelming emotional message. It included some minor corrections that Tchaikovsky had made after the premiere, and was thus the first performance of the work in the exact form in which it is known today.

Of Nápravník's own four operas the most successful was Dubrovsky (1894, staged 1895) written to a Russian libretto by Modest Ilyich Tchaikovsky after the story by Alexander Pushkin.

He died in Petrograd in 1916. In May 1917, his family went abroad and eventually settled in Belgium.

His wife was singer Olga Eduardovna Shryoder (Russian: Ольга Эдуардовна Шрёдер).

== Compositions ==
=== Operas ===
- Nizhegorodtzy (The Nizhniy-Novgorodians, 1867, staged 1868)
- Harold (1884, staged 1885)
- Dubrovsky, libretto by Modest Ilyich Tchaikovsky (1894, staged 1895)
- Francesca da Rimini (after Stephen Phillips's play based on the fragment from Dante's Divine Comedy, 1902)]

=== Orchestral and choral ===
- Four symphonies:
  - Symphony No. 1 (before 1861)
  - Symphony No. 2 in C, Op.17 (1873)
  - Symphony No. 3 in E minor, The Demon (after Lermontov's poem of the same name, 1874)
  - Symphony No. 4 in D minor, Op. 32 (1879)
- Ballads for voices and orchestra: The Voyevode, The Cossack, and Tamara (after Mikhail Lermontov)
- Suite for Orchestra
- Solemn Overture
- Marches and national dances for orchestra
- Fantasy and suite for violin and orchestra
- Concerto for piano and orchestra (Concerto symphonique) in A minor, Op. 27 (1877)
- Fantasy on Russian themes (Fantaisie russe) for piano and orchestra in B minor, Op. 39 (1881)
- Vlasta, overture on Slovak themes (1861)
- The East [Восток], symphonic poem for orchestra (1881)

=== Chamber music ===
- Three string quartets (1873–78)
- String quintet (1897)
- Two piano trios
- Piano quartet
- Violin and piano sonata
- Two suites for cello and piano
- String instrument and piano pieces

=== Incidental music ===
- Don Juan, incidental music for Aleksey Konstantinovich Tolstoy's play (1892)

== Selected discography ==
- Piano Concerto in A minor, Op. 27 and Fantasie Russe in B minor, Op. 39. Yevgeny Soifertis, piano; BBC Scottish Orchestra conducted by Alexander Titov (Hyperion CDA67511).
- Night Intermezzo (from opera "Dubrovsky" (Act IV); Melancholy, Op. 48 No. 3 [with music by Anatole Liadov] The USSR Symphony Orchestra, conductor Evgeni Svetlanov (Melodiya SUCD 10-00140, 1990)

== Legacy ==
- A school in the village of Býšť bears Nápravník's name today.
- His son Vladimir published a book about his father's life: Eduard Frantsovich Napravnik i ego sovremenniki, ISBN 5-7140-0412-4, 1991, in Russian.

== Quotations ==
"Mr. Napravnik is our well-known Russian orchestra conductor" (Fyodor Dostoyevsky: "The Brothers Karamazov" (1880), book 2, chapter 2).

== Sources ==
- "Направник, Эдуард Францович" . Brockhaus and Efron Encyclopedic Dictionary (in Russian). 1906.
