= List of Italian films of 1977 =

A list of films produced in Italy in 1977 (see 1977 in film):

Italian film productions released in 1977
Title	Director	Cast	Genre	Notes
L'altra metà del cielo	Franco Rossi	Adriano Celentano, Monica Vitti	—N/a	
Antonio Gramsci: The Days of Prison	Lino Del Fra	Riccardo Cucciolla, Lea Massari, Mimsy Farmer	—N/a	
L'appuntamento	Giuliano Biagetti	Renzo Montagnani, Barbara Bouchet	—N/a	
An Average Little Man	Mario Monicelli	Alberto Sordi, Shelley Winters, Romolo Valli, Vincenzo Crocitti	—N/a	
La banda Vallanzasca	Mario Bianchi	Enzo Pulcrano, Stefania D'Amario, Antonella Dogan	—N/a	
Beach House '	Sergio Citti	Jodie Foster, Mariangela Melato, Michele Placido	—N/a	
Beast with a Gun	Sergio Grieco	Helmut Berger, Richard Harrison, Marisa Mell	—N/a	
Il... Belpaese	Luciano Salce	Paolo Villaggio, Silvia Dionisio	black comedy	
Berlinguer, I Love You	Giuseppe Bertolucci	Roberto Benigni, Alida Valli, Carlo Monni	—N/a	
La Bestia in Calore	Luigi Batzella	Macha Magall	Exploitation	
Brothers Till We Die	Umberto Lenzi	Tomas Milian, Pino Colizzi, Mario Piave	—N/a	
Beyond Good and Evil	Liliana Cavani	Dominique Sanda, Robert Powell, Erland Josephson, Virna Lisi	—N/a	
La Bidonata	Luciano Ercoli	Walter Chiari, Maurizio Arena	crime-comedy	
The Bishop's Bedroom	Dino Risi	Ugo Tognazzi, Ornella Muti, Patrick Dewaere	—N/a	
Black Journal	Mauro Bolognini	Shelley Winters, Mario Scaccia, Max von Sydow, Renato Pozzetto, Laura Antonelli	drama	
La Bravata	Roberto Bianchi Montero	Franca Gonella, Silvano Tranquilli, Ajita Wilson	—N/a	
California	Michele Lupo	Giuliano Gemma, Raimund Harmstorf	Western	Italian-Spanish co-production
Canne mozze	Mario Imperoli	Antonio Sabàto, John Richardson	Crime	
Cara sposa	Pasquale Festa Campanile	Johnny Dorelli, Agostina Belli	comedy	
The Cat	Luigi Comencini	Ugo Tognazzi, Mariangela Melato, Dalila Di Lazzaro, Michel Galabru	—N/a	
Charleston	Marcello Fondato	Bud Spencer, James Coco, Herbert Lom	—N/a	
La compagna di banco	Mariano Laurenti	Lilli Carati, Gianfranco D'Angelo, Lino Banfi	—N/a	
Cosmos: War of the Planets	Alfonso Brescia	John Richardson, Massimo Bonetti	—N/a	
Could It Happen Here?	Massimo Pirri	Luc Merenda, Marcella Michelangeli	—N/a	
Crime Busters	E.B. Clucher	Bud Spencer, Terence Hill, David Huddleston	—N/a	
The Cynic, the Rat and the Fist	Umberto Lenzi	Maurizio Merli, Tomas Milian, John Saxon	—N/a	
Death Hunt	Gaetano Cisco	Pier Luigi Conti, Ninetto Davoli, Martine Carrell	—N/a	
Death Steps in the Dark	Maurizio Pradeaux	Leonard Mann, Robert Webber		
Destruction Force	Stelvio Massi	Luc Merenda, Tomas Milian	—N/a	
Dove volano i corvi d'argento	Piero Livi	Corrado Pani, Jenny Tamburi, Flavio Bucci	crime-drama	
Double Game	Carlo Ausino	George Hilton	poliziottesco	
Double Murder	Steno	Marcello Mastroianni, Agostina Belli, Ursula Andress, Peter Ustinov	—N/a	
Ecco noi per esempio	Sergio Corbucci	Adriano Celentano, Renato Pozzetto, Barbara Bach	—N/a	
Emanuelle and the Last Cannibals	Joe D'Amato	Laura Gemser, Gabriele Tinti	—N/a	
Emanuelle Around the World	Joe D'Amato	Laura Gemser, Karin Schubert	—N/a	
Emanuelle in America	Joe D'Amato	Laura Gemser, Gabriele Tinti	sexploitation	
The Forbidden Room	Dino Risi	Vittorio Gassman, Catherine Deneuve, Danilo Mattei	—N/a	Italian-French co-production
Il gabbiano	Marco Bellocchio	Laura Betti, Pamela Villoresi, Remo Girone	—N/a	
Gangbuster	Alberto Marras	Ray Lovelock, Mel Ferrer, Lilli Carati	poliziottesco	
Goodbye & Amen	Damiano Damiani	Tony Musante, Claudia Cardinale, John Steiner	—N/a	
The Heroin Busters	Enzo G. Castellari	Fabio Testi, David Hemmings	Crime	
Highway Racer	Stelvio Massi	Maurizio Merli, Lilli Carati	—N/a	
Hitch-Hike	Sergio Citti	Franco Nero, Corinne Cléry, David Hess	—N/a	
Holocaust 2000	Alberto De Martino	Kirk Douglas, Simon Ward, Agostina Belli, Virginia McKenna	—N/a	
I Am Afraid	Damiano Damiani	Gian Maria Volonté, Mario Adorf, Erland Josephson	—N/a	
In the Name of the Pope King	Luigi Magni	Nino Manfredi, Carlo Bagno	Historical Drama	
Jesus of Nazareth	Franco Zeffirelli	Robert Powell, Anne Bancroft, Ernest Borgnine, Claudia Cardinale, Rod Steiger	—N/a	
Kaput Lager – Gli ultimi giorni delle SS	Luigi Batzella	Richard Harrison, Lea Leander, Isarco Ravaioli	—N/a	
Kleinhoff Hotel	Carlo Lizzani	Corinne Cléry, Bruce Robinson, Michele Placido	—N/a	
Last Orgy of the Third Reich	Cesare Canevari	Daniela Poggi	—N/a	
El Macho	Marcello Andrei	Carlos Monzón, George Hilton	Western	
La malavita attacca... la polizia risponde!	Mario Caiano	Leonard Mann, Maria Rosaria Omaggio	—N/a	
A Man Called Magnum	Michele Massimo Tarantini	Luc Merenda, Enzo Cannavale	—N/a	
Mannaja	Sergio Martino	Maurizio Merli, John Steiner, Philippe Leroy	Western	
Il marito in collegio	Maurizio Lucidi	Enrico Montesano, Silvia Dionisio	—N/a	
Maschio latino cercasi	Giovanni Narzisi	Dayle Haddon, Gloria Guida, Stefania Casini	—N/a	
Messalina, Messalina	Bruno Corbucci	Tomas Milian, Anneka Di Lorenzo, Lino Toffolo	—N/a	
Il mostro	Luigi Zampa	Johnny Dorelli, Sydne Rome	—N/a	
Nazi Love Camp 27	Mario Caiano	Sirpa Lane	—N/a	
Nenè	Salvatore Samperi	Leonora Fani, Tino Schirinzi	—N/a	
Nerone	Castellacci & Pingitore	Pippo Franco, Enrico Montesano	—N/a	
Nine Guests for a Crime	Ferdinando Baldi	Arthur Kennedy, John Richardson	—N/a	
Onore e guapparia	Tiziano Longo	Pino Mauro, Laura Gray	—N/a	
Orazi e curiazi 3-2	Giorgio Mariuzzo	Lino Banfi, Gloria Guida, Gianni Agus	—N/a	
Padre Padrone	Paolo Taviani and Vittorio Taviani	Omero Antonutti, Saverio Marconi, Nanni Moretti	—N/a	
Per amore di Poppea	Mariano Laurenti	María Baxa, Alvaro Vitali	—N/a	
The Pajama Girl Case	Flavio Mogherini	Dalila Di Lazzaro, Ray Milland, Michele Placido, Mel Ferrer	—N/a	
Pane, burro e marmellata	Giorgio Capitani	Enrico Montesano, Rossana Podestà, Rita Tushingham	—N/a	
The Perfect Killer	Mario Siciliano	Lee Van Cleef, Tina Baker, John Ireland	—N/a	Italian-Spanish co-production
Pigs Have Wings	Paolo Pietrangeli	Lou Castel	drama	
Polizia selvaggia	Guido Zurli	Piero Fabiani, Giorgio Ardissan, Tarik Arkan	—N/a	Italian-Turkish co-production
Il prefetto di ferro	Pasquale Squitieri	Giuliano Gemma, Claudia Cardinale	—N/a	
La presidentessa	Luciano Salce	Mariangela Melato, Johnny Dorelli	—N/a	
Ready for Anything	Giorgio Stegani	Eleonora Giorgi, Bekim Fehmiu	—N/a	
Return of the 38 Gang	Giuseppe Vari	Antonio Sabato, Dagmar Lassander	—N/a	
The Rip-Off	Antonio Margheriti	Lee Van Cleef, Karen Black, Edward Albert	—N/a	
The Schoolteacher Goes to Boys' High	Mariano Laurenti	Edwige Fenech, Renzo Montagnani, Lino Banfi	—N/a	
Sahara Cross	Tonino Valerii	Franco Nero, Michel Constantin	Action	
Sette note in nero	Lucio Fulci	Jennifer O'Neill, Gianni Garko, Gabriele Ferzetti	giallo	
Shock	Mario Bava	Daria Nicolodi, John Steiner	—N/a	
A Special Day	Ettore Scola	Sophia Loren, Marcello Mastroianni, John Vernon	—N/a	
Spell – Dolce mattatoio	Alberto Cavallone	Paola Montenero, Jane Avril, Monica Ronchi	—N/a	
A Spiral of Mist	Eriprando Visconti	Marc Porel, Duilio Del Prete, Eleonora Giorgi	—N/a	
Squadra antitruffa	Bruno Corbucci	Tomas Milian, David Hemmings, Anna Cardini	—N/a	
SS Girls	Bruno Mattei	Ivano Staccioli, Alan Collins	—N/a	
Stato interessante	Sergio Nasca	Turi Ferro, Janet Agren, Monica Guerritore, Enrico Montesano, Magali Noël	—N/a	
Stunt Squad	Domenico Paolella	Marcel Bozzuffi, Vittorio Mezzogiorno	—N/a	
Suspiria	Dario Argento	Jessica Harper, Stefania Casini, Joan Bennett	Horror	
Taxi Girl	Michele Massimo Tarantini	Edwige Fenech, Aldo Maccione	—N/a	
Tentacles	Ovidio G. Assonitis	John Huston, Shelley Winters, Bo Hopkins,	Horror	Italian-American co-production
Three Tigers Against Three Tigers	Sergio Corbucci, Steno	Renato Pozzetto, Enrico Montesano, Paolo Villaggio	—N/a	
La tigre è ancora viva: Sandokan alla riscossa!	Sergio Sollima	Kabir Bedi, Philippe Leroy, Adolfo Celi	—N/a	
Tutti defunti... tranne i morti	Pupi Avati	Gianni Cavina, Francesca Marciano, Carlo Delle Piano	—N/a	
The Virgo, the Taurus and the Capricorn	Luciano Martino	Edwige Fenech, Alberto Lionello, Aldo Maccione	—N/a	
Twilight of Love	Luigi Scattini	Anthony Steel, Annie Belle, Hugo Pratt, Pam Grier	—N/a	
Viva Italia!	Mario Monicelli, Dino Risi, Ettore Scola	Vittorio Gassman, Ornella Muti, Alberto Sordi, Ugo Tognazzi		
Weapons of Death	Mario Caiano	Leonard Mann, Henry Silva	—N/a	
Wifemistress	Marco Vicario	Marcello Mastroianni, Laura Antonelli	—N/a	
Goodbye & Amen – L'uomo della CIA	Damiano Damiani	Claudia Cardinale, Tony Musante, John Forsythe	Action	
