= Love Camp 7 =

- Promotional poster
- Directed by: R.L. Frost
- Written by: Bob Cresse; Wes Bishop
- Produced by: Bob Cresse; Wes Bishop
- Starring: Maria Lease; Kathy Williams; Bob Cresse; Phil Poth; John Alderman; Carolyn Appleby; David F. Friedman; Bruce Kimball; Natasha Steel
- Cinematography: R.L. Frost
- Distributed by: Olympic International Films
- Release date: October 4, 1969 (Japan)
- Running time: 96 minutes
- Country: United States
- Language: English

Love Camp 7 is a 1969 American women-in-prison Nazisploitation B-movie directed by Lee Frost (credited as R.L. Frost) and written by Wes Bishop and Bob Cresse, the latter of whom also portrays a sadistic camp commandant.

== Plot ==
Two officers from the American Women's Army Corps volunteer to go undercover in a Nazi labor camp to gather information and potentially rescue Martha Grossman, a Jewish scientist. The female inmates serve as sex slaves for German officers and are subjected to humiliating treatment, torture, and rape.

When the two female agents learn that their target is being held in solitary detention, one of them arranges to be punished so that she can make contact. This leads to Lt. Harman being stripped and strung up by her wrists. The target uses her body to free Harman, and they attempt their escape. The escape plan ends in a climactic battle.

== Cast ==
- Maria Lease as WAC Lieutenant Linda Harman
- Kathy Williams as WAC Lieutenant Grace Freeman
- Bob Cresse as Commandant
- Phil Poth
- John Aiderman as Captain Robert Calais
- Carolyn Appleby as Blonde Prisoner
- Dave Friedman as Colonel Max Kemp
- Bruce Kimball as Sergeant Klaus Müller
- Rod Wilmouth as Colonel Karl Müller
- Rodger Steel as General Erich Von Hamer
- Natasha Steel
- Patricia Roddy
- Lee Frost (uncredited) as Taxi Driver

== Reception ==
Love Camp 7 is regarded as a cult classic because it represents the beginning of a fashion for exploitation films about women in prison in the 1970s, such as Women in Cages (1971) and The Big Bird Cage (1972), both of which made Pam Grier a recognizable name in the genre. It is also the first in the Nazi exploitation (or Nazisploitation) genre of concentration camp movies, including Ilsa: She-Wolf of the SS (1974) – which was produced by David F. Friedman and led to several sequels with Dyanne Thorne as the titular character – and the Italian Nazi Love Camp 27 (1977) and Last Orgy of the Third Reich (1977), the latter of which helped launch Daniela Poggi's showbusiness career.

It was declined a video certificate by the British Board of Film Classification in 2002 and by the New Zealand Office of Film & Literature Classification. The film was then one of the 72 video nasties banned in the UK. The BBFC upheld their rejection of the film when it was submitted for a certificate for streaming in 2020. It was originally banned in Australia, before passing several times in a modified version with an R18+ rating. It was finally passed uncut in 2005.

== See also ==
- List of American films of 1969
- Films dealing with Nazism and sexuality
