= Salvatore Baccaro =

Italian character actor (1932–1984)

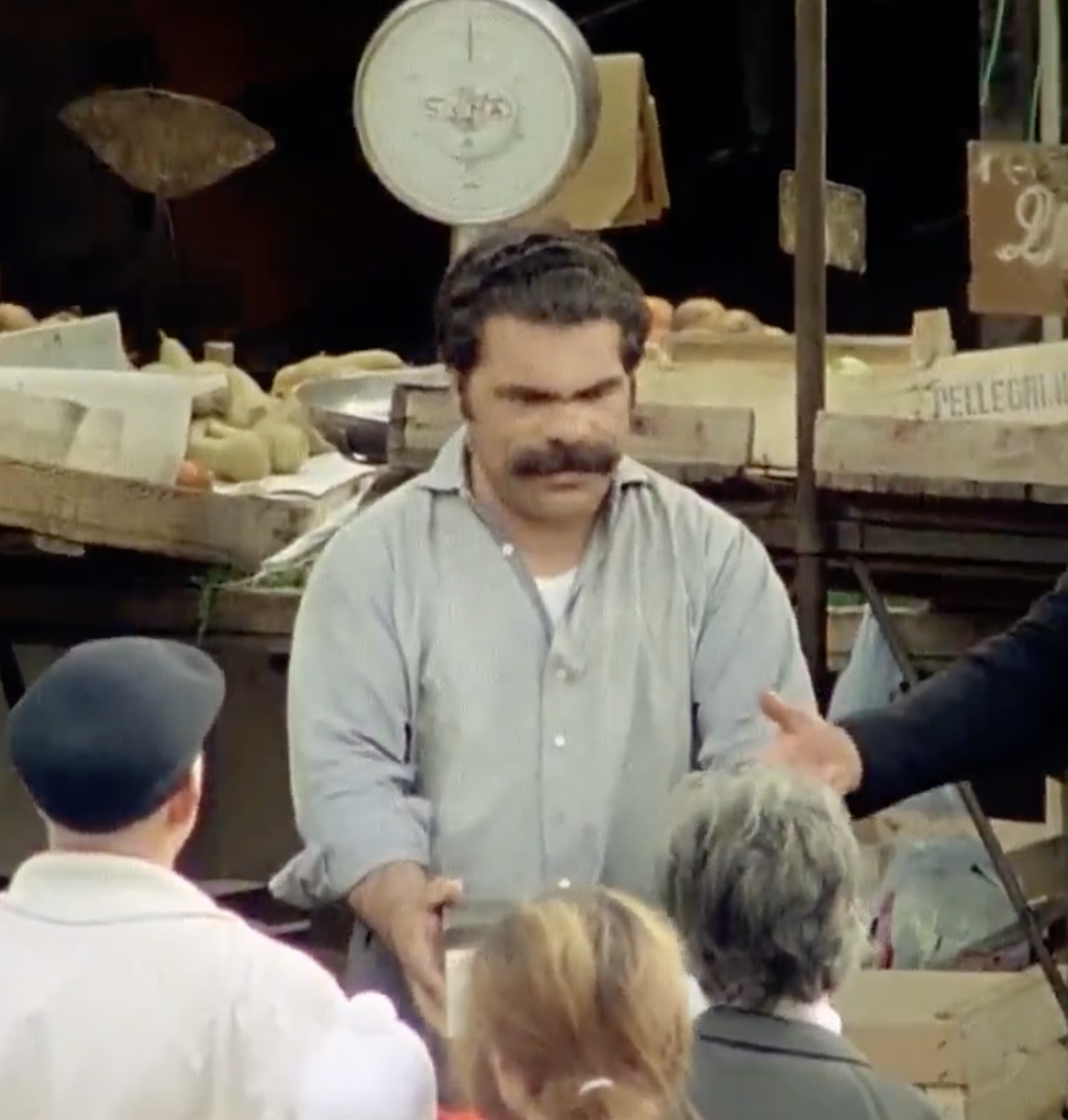
- Baccaro in Deep Red (1975)
- Born: 6 May 1932; Roccamandolfi, Italy
- Died: 13 March 1984 (aged 51); Novara, Italy
- Occupation: Actor
- Years active: 1970-1984

Salvatore Baccaro (6 May 1932 – 13 March 1984) was an Italian character actor. He was recognizable for his known acromegaly and appeared in more than sixty films from 1970 to 1984. He died on 13 March 1984 aged 51 after thyroid surgery.

== Filmography ==
Year	Title	Role	Notes
1970	The Most Beautiful Wife		
1970	Ma chi t'ha dato la patente?		
1971	He Was Called Holy Ghost	Prisoner	Uncredited
1972	Decameron n° 2 - Le altre novelle del Boccaccio	Friar in Purgatory	Uncredited
1972	His Name Was Holy Ghost	Spirito Santo's Men	
1972	Without Family	Male Nurse	Uncredited
1972	Two Brothers in Trinity	Paco	Uncredited
1972	Spirito Santo e le 5 magnifiche canaglie	Il capraio	Uncredited
1972	Two Sons of Trinity	King Kong	Uncredited
1972	Le notti peccaminose di Pietro l'Aretino	Satanasso	
1972	Decameron proibitissimo (Boccaccio mio statte zitto)	Brigante	Uncredited
1972	Salome		Uncredited
1972	Where the Bullets Fly		
1972	Man of the East	Prisoner	Uncredited
1972	The Grand Duel	Saloon Servant	
1973	Le mille e una notte... e un'altra ancora!	Sage #3	
1973	Il gatto di Brooklyn aspirante detective	Golem - the butler	
1973	Even Angels Eat Beans	Angelo's Food Tester	Uncredited
1973	Li chiamavano i tre moschettieri... invece erano quattro	Duke of Buckingham	
1973	Le favolose notti d'oriente		
1973	Provaci anche tu Lionel	Uomo che sviene	Uncredited
1973	Corte marziale	Mine Worker	Uncredited
1973	The Five Days	Garafino	
1973	Sette monache a Kansas City	Bart Henchman	
1974	The Arena	Winekeeper	
1974	Frankenstein's Castle of Freaks	Ook	credited as Boris Lugosi
1974	4 marmittoni alle grandi manovre	Un pastore	
1974	Farfallon	Galeotto	
1974	Charleston	Sonny's Neighbor	Uncredited
1975	Scusi eminenza... posso sposarmi?		
1975	Mondo candido	Orco	
1975	Deep Red	Fruit Vendor	Uncredited
1975	L'educanda	Righetto	
1975	Un urlo dalle tenebre	Man at the Sabbath	Uncredited
1975	Blonde in Black Leather	Scagnozzo di Michelone	
1975	Quant'è bella la Bernarda, tutta nera, tutta calda	Caprio	(segment "Il bell'Arturo"), Uncredited
1975	The Exorcist: Italian Style	Satanetto's Mother	
1976	Sex with a Smile	Client at Bar	(segment "La cavallona")
1976	Salon Kitty	Neanderthal Prison Inmate	Uncredited
1976	Sex with a Smile II	Salvatore, Sailor	(Segment "L'armadio Di Troia")
1976	Cassiodoro il più duro del pretorio		
1977	Emanuelle in America	Charlie	Uncredited
1977	SS Girls	Prisoner	Uncredited
1977	The Virgo, the Taurus and the Capricorn		
1977	La Bestia in Calore	The Beast	
1977	Von Buttiglione Sturmtruppenführer	Soldier	Uncredited
1977	Il mostro		
1978	The Soldier with Great Maneuvers	Crispino	Uncredited
1978	Starcrash	Neanderthal Man	Uncredited
1978	Proibito erotico		Uncredited
1979	The Gang That Sold America	Rocco dall'Orto	
1979	Saturday, Sunday and Friday	Gustavo	(segment "Sabato")
1979	La liceale, il diavolo e l'acquasanta	Primitive Man	
1980	In the Pope's Eye	Corista	
1980	Sugar, Honey and Pepper		Uncredited
1980	Il casinista	Orribile detenuto checca	
1981	Uno contro l'altro, praticamente amici	Anima gemella	
1981	Pierino contro tutti	Flipperista	Uncredited
1981	Caligula and Messalina	Brutish Man	Uncredited
1981	Pierino medico della Saub	Paziente che spaventa Gasperoni	Uncredited
1982	Pierino colpisce ancora	Giovanni - l'autista del pullman	
1983	Sfrattato cerca casa equo canone	Schiattamorto	
1983	Se tutto va bene siamo rovinati	Amilcare	
1984	Il tifoso, l'arbitro e il calciatore	AS Roma supporter	
1984	Le bon roi Dagobert	Le paysan	
1984	Tutti dentro		(final film role)
