= Gianni Marchetti =

Italian composer and songwriter

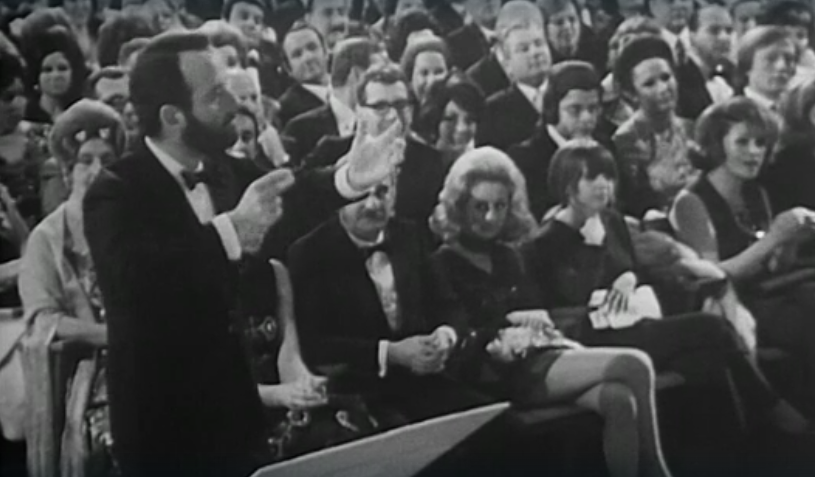
- Gianni Marchetti conducts the orchestra of the Sanremo Festival 1970

Background information
- Born: 7 September 1933; Rome
- Died: 10 April 2012 (aged 78) Rome
- Occupations: Composer; Conductor; Songwriter
- Labels: RCA Records; CAM

Gianni Marchetti (Rome, 7 September 1933 – Rome, 10 April 2012) was an Italian composer and songwriter. He collaborated with Piero Ciampi, lyricist Mogol, singer Bobby Solo and others.

== Early life ==
Gianni Marchetti was born on 7 September 1933, Rome, Italy. He enrolled in the musical institution Accademia Nazionale di Santa Cecilia in his early life to study piano in Rome. As a composer and conductor, he began his career in 1956.

== Career ==
Gianni Marchetti contributed to the soundtracks of around forty films. He also composed a number of solo albums including solstitium and equinox.

At the Sanremo Music Festival in 1965, the winning song was "Se piangi, se ridi". Gianni Marchetti was involved in its composition, and collaborated with Bobby Solo and Mogol.

In some of his work, he has also used the alias's Joe Dynamo and John Servus. Of the latter, through the distribution of the RCA, he produced the work Evening in 1977 which has been used in multiple productions, such as a commercial for the deoderant Bac, the films love duro e violento, Le notti porno nel mondo n 2, and for the anime Attack No. 1's Italian opening theme.

== Selected filmography ==
| Year | Film | Directed by | Ref |
|---|---|---|---|
| 1964 | Tears on Your Face | Ettore Maria Fizzarotti | |
| 1967 | Top Crack | Mario Russo | |
| 1967 | Spy Today, Die Tomorrow | Franz Josef Gottlieb | |
| 1967 | The Wild Eye | Paolo Cavara | |
| 1967 | Kill Me Quick, I'm Cold | Francesco Maselli | |
| 1968 | The Killer Likes Candy | Maurice Cloche; Federico Chentrens | |
| 1968 | One Step to Hell | Nino Scolaro | |
| 1968 | The Magnificent Tony Carrera | José Antonio de la Loma | |
| 1969 | Congo Hell | Mario Siciliano | |
| 1969 | The Eyes | Oscar Brazzi | |
| 1971 | Summer Affair | Giorgio Stegani | |
| 1974 | Zorro The Invincible | José Luis Merino | |
| 1974 | The Last Desperate Hours | Giorgio Stegani | |
| 1974 | My Dear Nephews | Franco Rossetti | |
| 1975 | Emanuelle's Revenge | Joe D'Amato | |
| 1977 | SS Girls | Bruno Mattei | |
| 1977 | Ready for Anything | Giorgio Stegani | |
| 1978 | Sexy Night Report | Joe D'Amato | |
| 1979 | Bedtime Stories | Bruno Mattei; Amasi Damiani | |
| 1989 | The Night of the Republic | Grazia Michelacci | |

== Bibliography ==
- Marchetti, Gianni (2010). Il mio Piero Ciampi: pagine di un incontro (in Italian). Coniglio. ISBN 8860632331.

== See also ==
- Piero Ciampi
- Bobby Solo
- Nada Malanima
- Nico Fidenco
