= Video nasty =

Horror trend

Video nasty is a colloquial term popularised by the National Viewers' and Listeners' Association (NVLA) in the UK to refer to a number of films, typically low-budget horror or exploitation films, distributed on VHS in the early 1980s that were criticised by the press, social commentators, and various religious organisations for their violent content. These video releases were not submitted to the British Board of Film Classification (BBFC) due to a loophole in film classification laws that allowed them to bypass the review process. The resulting uncensored video releases sparked public debate over the availability of these films to children, given the market's unregulated nature.

Following a campaign led by Mary Whitehouse and the NVLA, prosecutions were commenced against individuals engaged in trades exploiting allegedly obscene videos. To assist local authorities in identifying obscene films, the Director of Public Prosecutions released a list of 72 films the office believed to violate the Obscene Publications Act 1959. This list included films that had either been previously acquitted of obscenity or already obtained BBFC certification. In addition, a second list was released containing an additional 82 titles that were not believed to lead to obscenity convictions but could nonetheless be confiscated under the Act's forfeiture laws. The resultant confusion regarding the definition of obscene material led to Parliament passing the Video Recordings Act 1984, which required certification of video releases by the BBFC.

Because of their accessibility by underage viewers, the implementation of the Video Recordings Act imposed a stricter code of censorship on videos than was required for cinema release. Several major studio productions were banned on video, as they fell within the scope of legislation designed to control the distribution of video nasties. In later years, the stricter requirements were relaxed, as numerous films once considered video nasties obtained certification uncut or with minimal edits. Due to a legislative mistake discovered in August 2009, the Video Recordings Act 1984 was repealed and re-enacted without change by the Video Recordings Act 2010.

== Obscenity and video ==
At the time of the introduction of domestic video recorders in the UK in the 1970s, there was no legislation specifically designed to regulate video content, apart from the Obscene Publications Act 1959, which had been amended in 1977 to cover erotic films. Major film distributors were initially reluctant to embrace the new medium of video for fear of piracy, and the video market became flooded with low-budget horror films. Whilst some of these films had been passed by the BBFC for cinema release, others had been refused certification, which effectively banned them. The Obscene Publications Act defined obscenity as that which may "tend to deprave and corrupt persons who are likely, having regard to all relevant circumstances, to read, see or hear the matter contained or embodied in it". This definition is, of course, open to wide interpretation.

If the Director of Public Prosecutions (DPP) believed that a particular video might be in breach of the Act, a prosecution could be brought against the film's producers, distributors, and retailers. Prosecutions had to be fought on a case-by-case basis, and a backlog of prosecutions built up. However, under the terms of the Act, the police were empowered to seize videos from retailers if they were of the opinion that the material breached the Act. In the early 1980s, in certain police constabularies, notably Greater Manchester Police, which was then run by Chief Constable James Anderton, police raids on video hire shops increased. The choice of titles seized appeared to be completely arbitrary, one raid famously netting a copy of the Dolly Parton musical The Best Little Whorehouse in Texas (1982) under the mistaken belief it was pornographic.

The Video Retailers Association was alarmed by the random seizures and asked the DPP to provide the industry with guidelines to inform stockists of titles liable to confiscation. The DPP recognised that the current system, where the interpretation of obscenity was down to individual Chief Constables, was inconsistent and decided to publish a list that contained names of films that had already resulted in a successful prosecution or where the DPP had already filed charges against the video's distributors. This list became known as the DPP list of "video nasties".

The lack of regulation of the domestic video market was in sharp contrast to the regulation of material intended for public screenings. The BBFC had been established in 1912, essentially as an unintended consequence of the Cinematograph Act 1909, and it was their responsibility to pass films intended for the cinema for certification within the UK (though local councils were the final arbiters). As part of this process, the board could recommend, or, in more extreme cases, demand, that certain cuts be made to the film for it to gain a particular certification. Such permission was not always granted, and in the case of the release of The Exorcist in 1973, a number of enterprising cinema managers whose permission had been granted set about providing buses to transport cinema-goers from other localities where the film could not be seen.

== Public concern ==
Public awareness of the availability of these videos began in early 1982, when Vipco (Video Instant Picture Company), the UK distributors of The Driller Killer, a 1979 splatter film, took out full-page advertisements in a number of specialist video magazines, depicting the video's explicit cover; an action which resulted in a large number of complaints to the Advertising Standards Authority. A few months later Go Video, the distributors of the already-controversial 1980 Italian film Cannibal Holocaust, in an effort to boost publicity and generate sales that ultimately backfired, wrote anonymously to Mary Whitehouse of the NVALA complaining about their own film. Whitehouse sparked off a public campaign and coined the term "video nasty". Amid the growing concern, The Sunday Times brought the issue to a wider audience in May 1982 with an article entitled "How High Street Horror is Invading the Home". Soon, the Daily Mail began its own campaign against the distribution of these films. The exposure of "nasties" to children began to be blamed for the increase in violent crime amongst youths. The growing media frenzy only increased demand for such material among adolescents. At the suggestion of the NVALA, Conservative MP Graham Bright introduced a private member's bill to the House of Commons in 1983. This was passed as the Video Recordings Act 1984, which came into effect on 1 September 1985.

== Effects of the Video Recordings Act 1984 ==
Under the 1984 Act, the British Board of Film Censors was renamed the British Board of Film Classification and became responsible for the certification of both cinema and video releases. All video releases after 1 September 1985 had to comply with the Act and be submitted to the BBFC for classification. Films released on video before that date had to be resubmitted for classification within the following three years. The increased risk of videos falling into children's hands required that video classification be a separate process from cinema classification. Films that had passed uncut for cinema release were often cut for video.

The supply of unclassified videos became a criminal offence, as did supplying 15 and 18-certified videos to underage people. As well as the low-budget horror films the Act was originally intended to curb, a number of high-profile films which had passed cinema certification fell foul of the Act. In particular, The Exorcist, released by Warner Home Video in December 1981, was not submitted for video certification by the BBFC and was withdrawn from shelves in 1986. Similarly, Straw Dogs was denied video certification and removed from video stores. Popular culture backlash against the Video Recordings Act included the May 1984 release of "Nasty" by the punk-goth outfit The Damned, who celebrated the condemned genre with the lyrics "I fell in love with a video nasty".

== Relaxation of censorship ==
With the passing of the Video Recordings Act, the films on the list could be prosecuted for both obscenity and failure to be classified. As well as not passing any film liable to be found obscene, the BBFC imposed additional bans and cuts on films such as The Texas Chain Saw Massacre (1974). Claims, since proven at best to be speculative, at worst outright media fabrication, relating to the Hungerford massacre and the murder of James Bulger (where the 1991 film Child's Play 3 was erroneously held up as influencing the perpetrators, possibly prompting the 1992 film Mikey to be prohibited in the UK), provided an additional impetus to restrict films and as late as December 1997, the board claimed it "has never relaxed its guidelines on video violence, which remain the strictest in the world". However, the board did loosen its standards, especially at the 18 level, in response to public consultation in 2000. The departure of James Ferman from the BBFC may also have allowed some long-proscribed films to be re-appraised around this time. The Exorcist (1973) was granted an uncut 18 video certificate on 25 February 1999, followed by The Texas Chain Saw Massacre in August, and several official "nasties" were passed in the early 2000s either uncut or with cuts restricted to sexual violence or actual animals being harmed. A list of these is given below. Among modern films, many, such as the Hostel, Saw and Terrifier series, contain brutal, graphic violence but have passed through uncut.

- In 2008, there was another brief media frenzy over such films that had years earlier been approved for release by the BBFC, in particular SS Experiment Camp (1976). This coincided with an attempt by MPs Julian Brazier and Keith Vaz to pass a law allowing MPs greater powers to tighten BBFC guidelines or force an appeal of a release. The bill failed to pass.

The UK Government passed a law criminalising possession of "extreme pornography". Whilst BBFC-rated films are exempt from the legislation, screenshots from these same BBFC-rated movies are not, and would also apply to unrated films. Hostel: Part II was cited in the House of Commons as an example of a film where screenshots could become illegal to possess.

== DPP list ==
The DPP list of "video nasties" was first made public in June 1983. The list was modified monthly as prosecutions failed or were dropped. In total, 72 separate films appeared on the list at one time or another: 39 films were successfully prosecuted under the Obscene Publications Act, but a number of these films were subsequently cut and approved for release by the BBFC. The remaining 33 were either not prosecuted, or had their prosecutions be unsuccessful.

A number of films spent a short time on this list because their prosecutions failed shortly after publication or because it was decided that prosecution was not worth pursuing. Ultimately, the list became obsolete when the Video Recordings Act came into force, and since 2001, several of the films have been released uncut.

In the majority of cases below where cuts were made, there were scenes of real-life animal cruelty and/or excessive violence to women, both of which are still regarded with some degree of severity by the BBFC. A large number of these movies caused additional controversy over the cover art of the original big-box releases seen in video shops in the early 1980s. Unless noted otherwise, all films that have been released have been rated 18.

The DPP list is divided into two parts: Final 39 and Dropped 33. These titles were seized under Section 2 of the Obscene Publications Act, making the dealer or distributor liable to prosecution for disseminating obscene materials. Dealers could be fined or jailed, and the film itself would be declared obscene if the prosecution was successful, meaning it could not be distributed or sold in the UK until the obscenity was quashed. The final 39 of the video nasty list were successfully prosecuted and remained banned, while the dropped 33 may have been prosecuted but were subsequently dropped from the list after a series of acquittals and placed onto Section 3.

Section 3 titles were liable to confiscation under a "less obscene" charge, which allowed the police to seize a film they considered obscene; as long as the dealer cooperated, they legally admitted that the articles were obscene and therefore escaped any personal prosecution. The 33 films that could not be prosecuted under Section 2 automatically became Section 3 titles and were still seized by the police. The main difference between Sections 2 and 3 is that video dealers or distributors could be personally prosecuted in court for holding the film under Section 2, but not under Section 3, where obscenity is admitted by forfeiting the material.

As of May 2026, seven of the 72 films on the DPP list remain banned in the UK: five have not yet been resubmitted for classification by any distributors, and two have been rejected for classification.

One film was passed uncut for cinema, but has not been re-released in the UK.

=== Final 39 ===
1. Absurd (original title: Rosso Sangue, also known as Monster Hunter, Anthropophagus 2, and Horrible) – Originally passed with cuts for cinema. Released uncut in 2017. The film is classified at 18.
2. Anthropophagous: The Beast (original title: Antropophagus, also known as Anthropophagous, Antropofago, The Grim Reaper, Man Beast, Man-Eater, and The Savage Island) – Released with approximately 8 minutes of pre-edits as The Grim Reaper in 2002. Complete version passed uncut in June 2015.
3. Axe (also known as Lisa, Lisa and California Axe Massacre) – Originally passed with cuts for cinema. Released with 19 seconds cut in 1999. Released uncut in 2005 with an 18 certificate.
4. A Bay of Blood (original title: Reazione a Catena, also known as Twitch of the Death Nerve, Blood Bath and Bay of Blood) – Originally refused a cinema certificate in 1972. Released with 43 seconds cut in 1994. Re-released uncut in 2010.
5. The Beast in Heat (original title: La Bestia in Calore, also known as SS Hell Camp) – No UK re-release.
6. Blood Feast – Released with 23 seconds cut in 2001. Re-released uncut in 2005.
7. Blood Rites (also known as The Ghastly Ones) – No UK re-release.
8. Bloody Moon (original title: Die Säge des Todes) – Originally passed with cuts for cinema. Released with 1 minute 20 seconds cut in 1993. Released uncut in November 2008.
9. The Burning – Originally passed with cuts for cinema. Released with 19 seconds cut in 1992. Re-released uncut in 2001.
10. Cannibal Apocalypse (original title: Apocalypse Domani, also known as Invasion of the Flesh Hunters) – Released with 2 seconds of animal cruelty cut in 2005.
11. Cannibal Ferox (also known as Make Them Die Slowly) – Released with approximately 6 minutes of pre-cuts plus an additional 6 seconds cut to a scene of animal cruelty in 2000. Re-released with 1 minute 55 seconds of animal cruelty cuts in 2018.
12. Cannibal Holocaust – Released in 2001 with 5 minutes 44 seconds cut to remove most animal cruelty and rape scenes. Re-released with 15 seconds cut to one animal cruelty scene in 2011.
13. The Cannibal Man (original title: La Semana del Asesino) – Released with 3 seconds cut in 1993. Re-released uncut with a 15 certificate in January 2025.
14. Devil Hunter (original title: El Canibal) – Released uncut in November 2008.
15. Don't Go in the Woods – Released uncut in 2007 with a 15 rating.
16. The Driller Killer – Released with 54 seconds of pre-cuts in 1999. Re-released uncut in 2002.
17. Evilspeak – Released with 3 minutes 34 seconds cut in 1987. Re-released uncut in 2004.
18. Exposé (also known as House on Straw Hill) – Originally passed with cuts for cinema. Released with 51 seconds cut in 1997.
19. Faces of Death – Released with 2 minutes 19 seconds cut to animal cruelty in 2003.
20. Fight for Your Life – Originally refused a cinema certificate in 1981. No UK re-release.
21. Flesh for Frankenstein (also known as Andy Warhol's Frankenstein) – Originally passed with cuts for cinema. Released with 56 seconds cut in 1996. Released uncut in 2006.
22. Forest of Fear (also known as Toxic Zombies and Bloodeaters) – No UK re-release.
23. Gestapo's Last Orgy (original title: L'ultima orgia del III Reich, also known as Last Orgy of the Third Reich and Caligula Reincarnated as Hitler) – Refused a video certificate in 2021.
24. The House by the Cemetery (original title: Quella villa accanto al cimitero) – Originally passed with cuts for cinema. Released with over 4 minutes cut in 1988. Re-released with 33 seconds cut in 2001. Released uncut in 2009.
25. The House on the Edge of the Park (original title: La casa sperduta nel parco) – Originally refused a cinema certificate in 1981. Released with 11 minutes 43 seconds cut in 2002, and re-released with 42 seconds cut in 2011. Passed uncut in May 2022.
26. I Spit on Your Grave (also known as Day of the Woman) – Released with 7 minutes 2 seconds cut in 2001. Re-released in a longer re-edited format in 2003, which reframed the rape scenes but was cut by 43 seconds to the second rape scene by the BBFC. The original print was reissued with 3 minutes cut in 2010, and the film received 1 minute 41 seconds of cuts for the 2020 Blu-ray release.
27. Island of Death (original title: Ta Pedhia tou dhiavolou, also known as Devils in Mykonos and A Craving For Lust) – Originally passed with cuts for cinema. Refused a video certificate in 1987 under the title Psychic Killer II. Re-released with 4 minutes and 9 seconds cut in 2002. Released uncut in September 2010.
28. The Last House on the Left – Originally refused a cinema certificate in 1974 and again in 2000. Also refused a video certificate in 2001. Passed with 31 seconds cut in 2002. Released uncut on 17 March 2008.
29. Love Camp 7 – Refused a video certificate in 2002, and refused a certificate for streaming in 2020.
30. Madhouse (also known as There Was a Little Girl) – Released uncut in 2004.
31. Mardi Gras Massacre – Passed uncut in March 2022.
32. Nightmares in a Damaged Brain (also known as Nightmare) – Originally passed with cuts for cinema. Released with approximately 3 minutes of pre-edits in 2005. Re-released uncut in November 2015.
33. Night of the Bloody Apes (original title: La Horripilante bestia humana) – Originally passed with cuts for cinema. Released with approximately 3 minutes of pre-cuts in 1999. Re-released uncut in 2002.
34. Night of the Demon – Released with 1 minute 41 seconds cut in 1994. Released uncut in 2022.
35. Snuff – Passed uncut in 2003, but no UK release as of May 2026.
36. SS Experiment Camp (original title: Lager SSadis Kastrat Kommandantur, also known as SS Experiment Love Camp) – Released uncut in 2005.
37. Tenebrae (original title: Tenebre, also known as Unsane) – Originally passed with cuts for cinema. Released with 5 seconds cut in 1999. Re-released uncut in 2003.
38. The Werewolf and the Yeti (original title: La Maldicion de la Bestia, also known as Night of the Howling Beast) – No UK re-release.
39. Zombie Flesh Eaters (also known as Zombie and Zombi 2) – Originally passed with cuts for cinema. Released with 1 minute 46 seconds cut in 1992. Re-released with 23 seconds cut in 1999. Released uncut in 2005.

=== Dropped 33 ===
1. The Beyond (original title: E Tu Vivrai Nel Terrore ‒ L'Aldilà, also known as Seven Doors of Death) — Originally passed with cuts for cinema. Released with approximately 2 minutes cut in 1987. Re-released uncut in 2001.
2. The Boogey Man (also known as The Boogeyman) ‒ Originally passed uncut for cinema. Released with 44 seconds cut in 1992. Re-released uncut in 2000.
3. Cannibal Terror (original title: Terreur Cannibale) ‒ Released uncut in 2003.
4. Contamination ‒ Released uncut in 2004 with a 15 rating.
5. Dead & Buried ‒ Originally passed uncut for cinema. Released with 30 seconds cut in 1990. Re-released uncut in 1999.
6. Death Trap (also known as Eaten Alive and Starlight Slaughter) ‒ Originally passed with cuts for cinema. Released with 25 seconds cut in 1992. Re-released uncut in 2000.
7. Deep River Savages (original title: Il paese del sesso selvaggio, also known as Man From Deep River) ‒ Originally refused a cinema certificate in 1975. Eventually released with 3 minutes 45 seconds of animal cruelty cuts in 2003, and re-released with 3 minutes of similar cuts in 2016.
8. Delirium (also known as Psycho Puppet) ‒ Released with 16 seconds cut in 1987. Released uncut in February 2022.
9. Don't Go in the House ‒ Originally passed with cuts for cinema. Released with 3 minutes and 7 seconds cut in 1987. Re-released uncut in December 2011.
10. Don't Go Near the Park ‒ Released uncut in 2006.
11. Don't Look in the Basement (also known as The Forgotten) ‒ Originally passed with cuts for cinema. Released uncut in 2005 with a 15 rating.
12. The Evil Dead ‒ Originally passed with cuts for cinema. Released with approximately 2 minutes cut in 1990. Re-released uncut in 2001.
13. Frozen Scream ‒ No UK re-release.
14. The Funhouse ‒ Originally passed uncut for cinema. Released uncut in 1987. Re-classified 15 in 2007.
15. Human Experiments ‒ Originally passed uncut for cinema. No UK re-release.
16. I Miss You, Hugs and Kisses (also known as Drop Dead Dearest) ‒ Released with 1 minute 6 seconds cut in 1986.
17. Inferno ‒ Originally passed with cuts for cinema. Released with 20 seconds cut in 1993. Re-released uncut in September 2010.
18. Killer Nun (original title: Suor Omicidi) ‒ Released with 13 seconds cut in 1993. Re-released uncut in 2006.
19. Late Night Trains (original title: L'ultimo treno della notte, also known as Night Train Murders) ‒ Originally refused a cinema certificate in 1976. Released uncut in 2008.
20. The Living Dead at the Manchester Morgue (original title: Non si deve profanare il sonno dei morti, also known as Let Sleeping Corpses Lie and Don't Open the Window) ‒ Originally passed with cuts for cinema. Released with 1 minute 53 seconds cut in 1985. Re-released uncut in 2002.
21. Nightmare Maker (also known as Night Warning and Butcher, Baker, Nightmare Maker) ‒ Refused a video certificate in 1987 under the title The Evil Protege. Released uncut in 2024.
22. Possession ‒ Originally passed uncut for cinema. Released uncut in 1999.
23. Pranks (also known as The Dorm That Dripped Blood and Death Dorm) ‒ Released with 10 seconds cut in 1992.
24. Prisoner of the Cannibal God (original title: La montagna del dio cannibale, also known as Mountain of the Cannibal God and Slave of the Cannibal God) ‒ Originally passed with cuts for cinema. Released with 2 minutes 6 seconds of animal cruelty cuts in 2001, and re-released with 2 minutes of similar cuts in 2018.
25. Revenge of the Bogey Man (original title: Boogeyman II) ‒ Released in re-edited form with additional footage in 2003.
26. The Slayer ‒ Released with 14 seconds cut in 1992. Re-released uncut in 2001.
27. Terror Eyes (also known as Night School) ‒ Originally passed with cuts for cinema. Released with 1 minute 16 seconds cut in 1987. Re-released uncut as Night School in 2025.
28. The Toolbox Murders ‒ Originally passed with cuts for cinema. Released with 1 minute 46 seconds cut in 2000. Re-released uncut in 2017.
29. Unhinged ‒ Originally passed uncut for cinema. Released uncut in 2004.
30. Visiting Hours ‒ Originally passed with cuts for cinema. Released with approximately 1 minute cut in 1986. Passed uncut in 2017.
31. The Witch Who Came From the Sea ‒ Released uncut in 2006.
32. Women Behind Bars (original title: Des diamants pour l'enfer by Jess Franco) ‒ Passed uncut in 2017.
33. Zombie Creeping Flesh (also known as Hell of the Living Dead, Night of the Zombies and Virus) ‒ Originally passed uncut for cinema in an edited version. Full version released uncut in 2002.

=== "Section 3" 82 ===
A supplementary list was issued along with the official list, which featured a list of so-called "Section 3 Video Nasties". Titles on the Section 3 list could not be prosecuted for obscenity but were liable to seizure and confiscation under a "less obscene" charge. Tapes seized under Section 3 could be destroyed after distributors or merchants forfeited them.

1. Abducted (a.k.a. Schoolgirls in Chains) – No UK re-release.
2. The Aftermath (a.k.a. Zombie Aftermath) – Passed without cuts in 1988 on the Goldcrest video label.
3. The Black Room – Originally passed uncut for cinema. No UK re-release.
4. Blood Lust (a.k.a. Mosquito the Rapist) – Passed with heavy cuts for cinema. No UK re-release.
5. Blood Song – Re-released as Dream Slayer.
6. Blue Eyes of the Broken Doll – No UK re-release.
7. Brutes and Savages – No UK re-release.
8. Cannibal (a.k.a. Ultimo Mondo Cannibale and Last Cannibal World) – Originally passed with heavy cuts for cinema. Released with 2m 46s of cuts in 2003.
9. Cannibal World (a.k.a. Mondo Cannibale and The Cannibals) – No UK re-release.
10. The Chant of Jimmie Blacksmith – Passed uncut for cinema in 1978. Released without cuts in 1987.
11. The Child – Passed uncut for cinema. Released uncut in 2006.
12. Christmas Evil (a.k.a. You Better Watch Out) – Released uncut in 2012 with a 15 rating.
13. Communion (a.k.a. Alice Sweet Alice) – Passed uncut for cinema. Passed with 8s of cuts in 1998. Released uncut in 2014.
14. Dawn of the Dead – Originally passed with heavy cuts for cinema. Passed with cuts for video in 1989 and 1997. Released uncut in 2003.
15. Dawn of the Mummy – Passed with 27s of cuts for cinema. Passed with 1m 43s of cuts for the video in 1987. Released uncut in 2003.
16. Dead Kids (a.k.a. Strange Behavior) – Passed with 27s of cuts in 1993 and 2008.
17. Death Weekend (a.k.a. The House by the Lake) – Passed with cuts for cinema. No UK re-release.
18. Deep Red (a.k.a. Profondo Rosso) – Passed with 11s of cuts in 1993. The extended version was passed uncut in 2010.
19. Demented – Released with 1m 19s of cuts in 1987.
20. The Demons (a.k.a. Les Démons) – A composite version was passed uncut in 2008, and the original version was passed uncut in 2017.
21. Don't Answer the Phone – Passed with cuts for cinema. An edited version was released without further cuts in 2005.
22. Eaten Alive! – Passed with heavy cuts for cinema. Passed with heavy cuts for animal cruelty in 1987 and 1992.
23. Enter the Devil (a.k.a. Disciples Of Death) – No UK re-release.
24. The Erotic Rites of Frankenstein – Released uncut in the U.K. on 22nd Jan, 2018, with an "18" certificate.
25. The Evil – No UK re-release.
26. The Executioner (a.k.a. Massacre Mafia Style) – No UK re-release.
27. Final Exam – Released uncut in 1986.
28. Foxy Brown – Passed in edited form for cinema. Passed with 2m 48s of cuts in 1987. Released with previous cuts waived in 1998.
29. Friday the 13th – The R-rated version was released without cuts in 1987. The full unrated version (previously released for cinema) was released uncut in 2003.
30. Friday the 13th Part 2 – The R-rated version was passed uncut in 1987. Downgraded to an uncut 15 certificate in 2008.
31. GBH (a.k.a. Grievous Bodily Harm) – No UK re-release.
32. Graduation Day – Passed uncut in 1986. Downgraded to an uncut 15 certificate in 2003.
33. Happy Birthday to Me – Passed uncut for cinema. Also passed uncut for video in 1986. Downgraded to an uncut 15 certificate in 2004.
34. The Headless Eyes – No UK re-release.
35. Hell Prison (a.k.a. Escape from Hell) – No UK re-release.
36. The Hills Have Eyes – Passed with cuts for cinema. Passed with 2s of cuts for video in 1987. Released uncut in 2003.
37. Home Sweet Home – Released uncut in 2004.
38. Honeymoon Horror – No UK re-release.
39. Inseminoid – Passed uncut for cinema. Also passed uncut for video in 1987. Downgraded to a 15 certificate in 2005.
40. Invasion of the Blood Farmers – No UK re-release.
41. The Killing Hour (a.k.a. The Clairvoyant) – Originally passed uncut for cinema. Passed with 1m 19s of cuts in 1986.
42. The Last Horror Film (a.k.a. Fanatic) – Passed with cuts for cinema. An edited version was released in 2003.
43. The Last Hunter – Passed uncut for cinema. Passed with 8s of cuts in 1988. Released uncut in 2002.
44. The Love Butcher – No UK re-release.
45. Mad Foxes – No UK re-release.
46. Mark of the Devil – Passed with heavy cuts for cinema. Passed with cuts in 1998 and 2003. Released uncut in 2013.
47. Martin – Passed uncut for cinema. Also passed uncut for video in 1994.
48. Massacre Mansion (a.k.a. Mansion of the Doomed) – Passed uncut for cinema. Also passed uncut for video in 1992. Downgraded to an uncut 15 certificate in 2000.
49. Mausoleum – Released uncut in 1987.
50. Midnight – Passed uncut for cinema. An edited version was released in 1993. Full version passed uncut in 2011.
51. Naked Fist (a.k.a. Firecracker) – Passed with 3m 53s of cuts for cinema. No UK re-release.
52. The Nesting – Passed uncut in 1986.
53. The New Adventures of Snow White (a.k.a. Grimm Fairy Tales for Adults) – No UK re-release.
54. Nightbeast – Passed uncut in 1996.
55. Night of the Living Dead – Passed with cuts for cinema. Released uncut in 1987. Downgraded to a 15 certificate in 2007. Now in the public domain.
56. Nightmare City (a.k.a. City of the Walking Dead) – Passed with 3m 5s of cuts in 1986. Released uncut in 2003.
57. Oasis of the Zombies – Passed uncut in 2004 with a 15 certificate.
58. Parasite – Passed uncut for cinema. Also passed uncut for video in 1993.
59. Phantasm – Passed uncut for cinema. Also passed uncut for video in 1989. Downgraded to a 15 certificate in 2005.
60. Pigs (a.k.a. Daddy's Deadly Darling) – Released by 88 Films in 2016. Unknown if cut.
61. Prey – Passed with 11s of cuts for cinema and video. A print shortened for dialogue was passed uncut in 2004.
62. Prom Night – Passed uncut for cinema. Also passed uncut for video in 1987.
63. Rabid – Passed uncut for cinema. Also passed uncut for video in 1992.
64. Rosemary's Killer (a.k.a. The Prowler) – Passed with cuts for cinema. Released uncut in 2007.
65. Savage Terror (a.k.a. Primitives) – No UK re-release.
66. Scanners – Passed uncut for cinema. Also passed uncut for video in 1987.
67. Scream for Vengeance! – No UK re-release.
68. Shogun Assassin – Passed with cuts for cinema. Released uncut in 1999.
69. Street Killers (original title: La belva col mitra, also known as Mad Dog Killer) – Released uncut in 2016.
70. Suicide Cult (a.k.a. The Astrologer) – No UK re-release.
71. Superstition (a.k.a. The Witch) – Passed uncut for cinema. Also passed uncut for video in 1986.
72. Suspiria – Passed with cuts for cinema. Released uncut in 1998.
73. Terror – Passed with cuts for cinema. Released uncut in 1997.
74. The Texas Chain Saw Massacre — Refused a cinema certificate in 1975. Passed uncut in 1999.
75. The Thing – Passed uncut for cinema. Also passed uncut for video in 1987.
76. Tomb of the Living Dead (a.k.a. Mad Doctor of Blood Island) – Passed with cuts for cinema. Released with 42s of animal cruelty cuts in 2003.
77. The Toy Box – No UK re-release.
78. Werewolf Woman – Passed with cuts for cinema. Scheduled for a re-release on Blu-Ray in February 2026.
79. Wrong Way – No UK re-release.
80. Xtro – Passed uncut for cinema. Also passed uncut for video in 1987. Downgraded to an uncut 15 certificate in 2007.
81. Zombie Holocaust – Passed uncut in 2000.
82. Zombie Lake – Passed uncut in 2004.

=== Other films seized/prosecuted by the police but not classed as video nasties ===
- Alien Terror – Seized for sharing a VHS release with Section 3 title Nightmare City. Released uncut in 2016.
- In the Realm of the Senses – Seized and successfully prosecuted for unsimulated sex scenes. Passed with 10s of cuts in 2000, and passed uncut in 2011.
- Maniac — Banned for cinema in 1981 and again for video in 1998. Released with 58 seconds of cuts in 2002. Released uncut in 2022.
- Mother's Day — Banned for cinema in 1980. Released uncut in 2015.
- Basket Case – Seized for similarity to other slasher films. Originally passed with cuts for the cinema. Passed with an additional 35 seconds of cuts in 1987. Released uncut in 1999.
- Blood for Dracula – Seized for association with and similarity to Flesh for Frankenstein. Originally passed with cuts for the cinema. Released uncut in 1995.
- City of the Living Dead – Another horror film by Lucio Fulci, who had multiple films on the DPP list. Originally passed with cuts for the cinema. Passed with 2m 21s of cuts in 1987. Released uncut in 2001.
- Macabre – Seized due to the cover art, which displayed a severed head inside a refrigerator. Released uncut in 1987.
- Madman – Seized for similarity to other slasher films. Originally passed uncut for cinema. Released uncut in 2002.
- Night of the Seagulls – Seized for similarity to other zombie films and the explicit cover imagery. An alternative title to the film was Don't Go Out at Night, which may have been linked to the multiple Don't titles on the DPP list. Passed with 1m 6s of cuts in 1987. Released uncut in 2005.
- Terror Express – Seized for similarity to Night Train Murders. No UK re-release.
- Cataclysm – Seized for cover artwork which displayed a stabbing in front of a Nazi swastika. Passed uncut in 2003

=== Other films ===
- A Clockwork Orange – Sometimes mistakenly believed to have been banned by the BBFC, it was actually Stanley Kubrick himself who withdrew the film from exhibition in the UK in 1973 on police advice. This was after receiving death threats toward himself and his family, as well as disliking reports found in the British Press that the film was responsible for copycat violence. Quoting Kubrick: "To try and fasten any responsibility on art as the cause of life seems to me to put the case the wrong way around. Art consists of reshaping life, but it does not create life, nor cause life. Furthermore, to attribute powerful suggestive qualities to a film is at odds with the scientifically accepted view that, even after deep hypnosis, in a posthypnotic state, people cannot be made to do things which are at odds with their natures". After Kubrick's death, the film was re-released uncut at cinemas in the UK in 2000, and thereafter on both VHS and DVD.
- Child's Play 3 – The film became notorious in the United Kingdom when it was suggested it might have inspired the real-life murder of James Bulger (a suggestion rejected by officers investigating the case) and the murder of Suzanne Capper (the police and the British Board of Film Classification ruled out any connection between the movie and the murder).
- The Exorcist – Although never officially cut or banned in the UK, several attempts to release the film on video were thwarted by BBFC censor James Ferman, who cited both the age of the possessed girl (as she was under 12, the film might have had significant appeal to underaged viewers) and reports of incidents of hysteria involving young women (leading to concerns that the film might cause severe emotional problems for those who believed in demonic possession) as obstacles to a home release. Following a successful theatrical re-release in 1998 and Ferman's retirement as censor in January 1999, the film was submitted for home video release for the first time in February 1999, and was passed uncut with an "18" certificate. The film had previously been released on video in 1981, uncertificated, by Warner Home Video.
- Last House on Dead End Street – Also known as The Fun House, this film was probably the intended target when the BBFC added the similarly-entitled The Funhouse to the list. Passed uncut with an "18" certificate in 2006.
- Scum – The original TV film was made by the BBC, but they later decided not to broadcast it owing to the violence and suicides in the film. It was quickly remade by most of the original production team and released in cinemas, and was released on VHS at the height of the Video Nasties controversy, quickly becoming associated with them in the media.
- Mikey – The film was withdrawn from release in the United Kingdom following the James Bulger murder in Liverpool in 1993. The decision was made by the BBFC, which refused to issue it a UK release certificate in 1996. It is now allowed uncut in the UK at the 15 certificate.

== Ireland ==
The moral concern extended to Ireland. In 1986, the Dáil Select Committee on Criminal Lawlessness and Vandalism issued a report "Controls on video nasties" recommending that the powers of the film censor's office be extended to videos.

This was implemented by the Video Recordings Act in 1989, first enforced in 1991 and currently last in 2010, reiterating the existing video ban on I Spit on Your Grave.

Other banned titles, eventually passed with 18 certificates, include The Evil Dead, Natural Born Killers, Showgirls and Zombie Flesh Eaters.

== In popular culture ==
=== In film ===
- Censor (2021) – a British psychological horror film directed by Prano Bailey-Bond in which the protagonist works as a censor for the British Board of Film Classification (BBFC).

=== In video games ===
- Perfect Dark (2000) – the cutscene that plays at the beginning of the level "Area 51 – Infiltration", in which a secret video recording of the base is shown, is titled "Video Nasty" in the game's Cinema menu.

=== In music ===
- British Goth/Punk rock band The Damned created a song called "Nasty" for The Young Ones TV series in 1984. The song's lyrics directly reference themes found in many Video Nasties praising the listed films in a tongue and cheek way as it says "I fell in love with a Video Nasty". Nasty was released shortly afterwards as a single on their album Thanks for the Night.
- Electronic music duo Femtanyl released a song entitled Video Nasty (stylized as VIDEO NASTY) as part of their 2026 debut album Man Bites Dog.

== See also ==
- Film censorship in the United Kingdom
- List of Hong Kong Category III films
- Extreme cinema
- Vulgar auteurism
- AGFA Horror Trailer Show and Trailer War – two compilation films featuring trailers from some of the "video nasties"

== Sources ==
- Martin, John (1983). Seduction of the Gullible: The Truth Behind the Video Nasty Scandal.
- Kerekes, David (2000). See No Evil.
- Morris, Marc; Fenton, Harvey; Brewster, Francis (2005). Shock! Horror! Astounding Artwork from the Video Nasty Era.
- Morris, Marc; Wingrove, Nigel (1998). The Art of the Nasty.
- Ban the Sadist Videos Pt 1 (documentary)
- Ban the Sadist Videos Pt 2 (documentary)
- Video Nasties: Moral Panic, Censorship & Videotape (documentary)
- Video Nasties: Draconian Days (documentary)
