= Nazi exploitation =

Subgenre of film

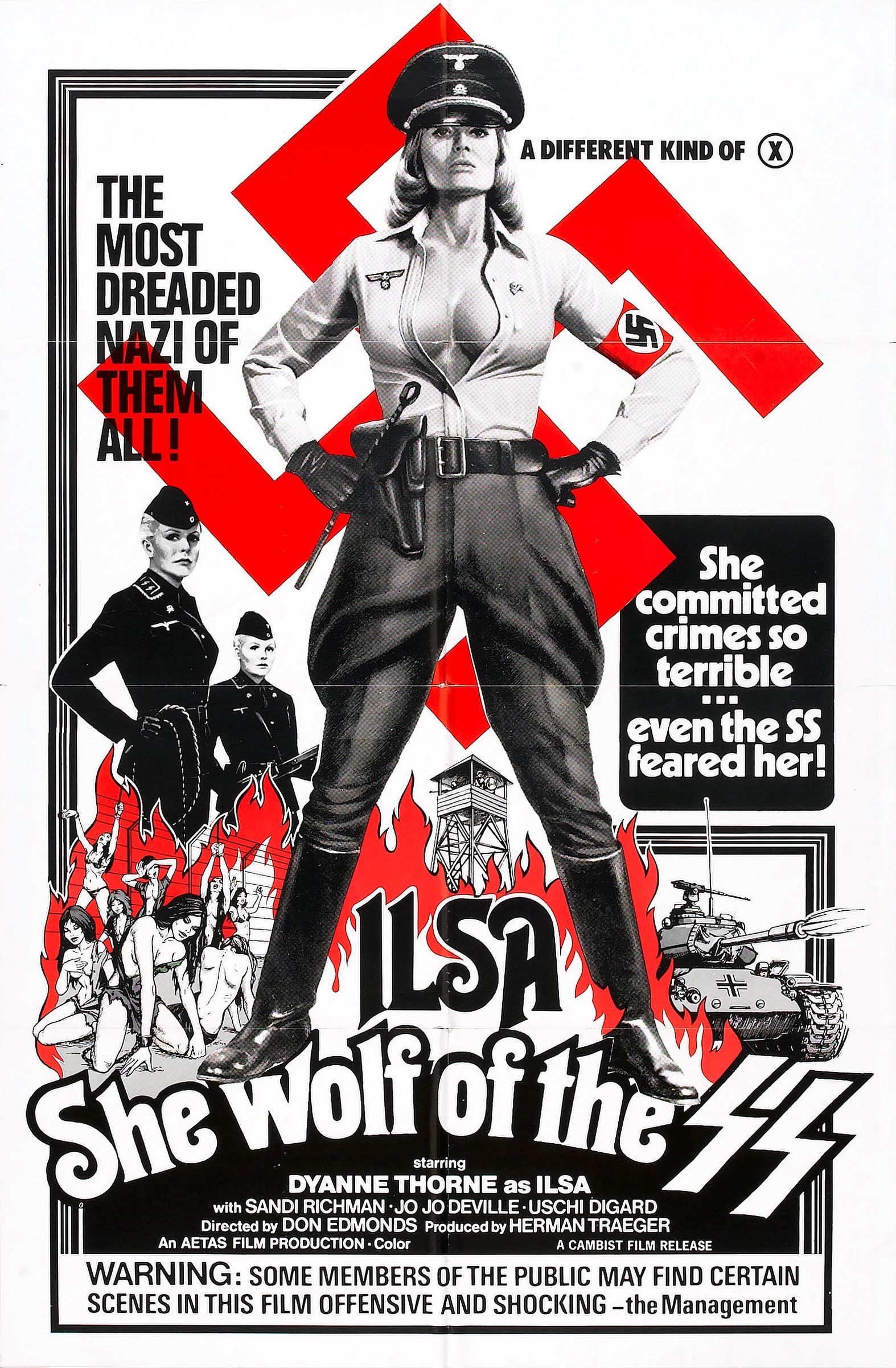
Ilsa, She Wolf of the SS is considered the quintessential Nazisploitation film.

Nazi exploitation (also Nazisploitation) is a subgenre of exploitation film and sexploitation film that involves Nazis committing sex crimes, often as camp or prison overseers during World War II. Most follow the women-in-prison formula, relocated to a concentration camp, an extermination camp, or a Nazi brothel, with an added emphasis on sadism, gore, and degradation. The most infamous and influential title (which set the standards of the genre) is a Canadian production, Ilsa, She Wolf of the SS (1974). Its surprise success and that of Salon Kitty and The Night Porter led European filmmakers, mostly in Italy, to produce similar films, with just over a dozen being released over the next few years. Globally exported to both cinema and VHS, the films were critically attacked and heavily censored, and the sub-genre had all but vanished by the end of the 1970s.

In Italy, these films are known as part of the "il sadiconazista" cycle, which were inspired by such art-house films as Pier Paolo Pasolini's Salò, or the 120 Days of Sodom (1975), and Tinto Brass's Salon Kitty (1976). Prominent directors of the genre include Paolo Solvay (La Bestia in Calore, also known as The Beast in Heat and SS Hell Camp), Cesare Canevari (Last Orgy of the Third Reich, also known as L'ultima orgia del III Reich, Gestapo's Last Orgy and Caligula Reincarnated as Hitler), and Alain Payet (Train spécial pour SS, also known as Special Train for Hitler and Helltrain), all from 1977.

== History ==
Italian directors pioneered a blend of sexual imagery and Nazi themes. This can be found as early as 1945 in Rome, Open City by Roberto Rossellini. Another Rossellini film, Germany, Year Zero (1948), connects Nazism with pedophilia. The controversial art-house production The Damned (1969), directed by Luchino Visconti, about the rise and fall of a German industrialist family in the Third Reich, is also a major influence on the genre. The film features an orgy of homosexual SA-Men. It depicts one of the main characters as a troubled pervert posing in a transvestite outfit, molesting little girls, and committing incest with his mother.

Other early examples that combine sexual themes and Nazism include the West German productions Des Teufels General (The Devil's General) (1955) by Helmut Käutner and Lebensborn (Ordered to Love) (1961). The French art-house film Vice and Virtue (1963), directed by Roger Vadim, is a stylized retelling of the Marquis de Sade's Justine set during the Nazi occupation of France. This is a subtle and satirical rendering that only hints at the sexual depravity explicit in the original novel.

The critically acclaimed 1964 film The Pawnbroker includes a flashback scene showing nude women kept in a concentration camp brothel. The Italian Giallo thriller In the Folds of the Flesh (also known as Nelle pieghe della carne, 1970) has a similar flashback sequence with attractive nude women being herded into a Nazi gas chamber. However, the earliest full-blown sexploitation film set in a Nazi camp was Love Camp 7 (1969). The film can also be viewed as a precursor to the similarly themed women-in-prison genre which was initially popularized by Roger Corman's The Big Doll House (1971).

Love Camp 7 established the pattern for the many films that followed. The story resembles a "true adventure" pulp yarn from a men's adventure magazine of the period (Man's Story, Men Today, World of Men, Man's Epic, et al.). In order to rescue a Jewish scientist, two female agents infiltrate a Nazi Joy Division camp, where prisoners are kept as sex slaves for German officers. There are scenes of boot-licking humiliation, whipping, torture, lesbianism, and near-rape, culminating in a violent and bloody escape. The stock characters include a cruel and perverse commandant, a lesbian doctor, sadistic guards who freely abuse the prisoners, and a sympathetic German who tries to help the captive women.

The theme of Nazi sexual abuse continued in the sleazy, violent drive-in programmer The Cut-Throats (1969) and Torture Me, Kiss Me (1970), a low-budget, black-and-white B-movie about sadistic Nazi officers tormenting female civilians (including fetishistic flogging scenes) in occupied France.

=== The Ilsa influence ===
Producer David F. Friedman had a small acting role in Love Camp 7. He went on to produce Ilsa, She Wolf of the SS in 1974. Ilsa was unique in that the camp commandant was a sexy, sex-crazed woman played by the busty and frequently nude Dyanne Thorne. Between sex scenes, Ilsa subjects her male and female inmates to horrific scientific tests, much like Josef Mengele's notorious Nazi human experimentation at Auschwitz. Some of the tests on hypothermia and pressure-chamber endurance were factual, while others were pure fantasy.

The character is also inspired by "The Witch of Buchenwald", Ilse Koch, the wife of the commandant of the Buchenwald concentration camp. Koch was known for having perverse sexual dalliances with the prisoners and was rumored to have had lampshades made from human skin.

Ilsa includes the standard elements of sadism, degradation, whipping, sexual slavery, female-on-male rape, graphic torture, and a bloody finale where Ilsa is shot dead and the camp is set ablaze. The film was a surprise hit on the drive-in theater and grindhouse circuit. Ilsa was resurrected for three profitable sequels that ignored the original film's Nazi origins and are closer in nature to the women-in-prison genre. As a freelance mistress-for-hire, she became a harem manager in Ilsa, Harem Keeper of the Oil Sheiks (1976), commander of a 1953 gulag in Ilsa, the Tigress of Siberia (1977), and the warden of a corrupt Latin-American prison in Ilsa, the Wicked Warden (1977).

=== Nazi films from Italy and France ===
Meanwhile, European filmmakers were creating their own lurid Nazi movies with Ilsa-type villains. In 1977, Malisa Longo starred in Helga, She Wolf of Stilberg as a black-booted, leather-clad, sexually sadistic commander of a prison camp for women. That year, Longo also starred in the Salon Kitty-inspired Fräulein Devil (also known as Elsa: Fraulein SS) as Elsa, a former hooker with a penchant for S&M, who manages a Nazi brothel train. This was filmed back-to-back with Hitler's Last Train (also known as Special Train for the SS, Helltrain and Love Train for the SS, 1977). These films, plus Nathalie: Escape from Hell (1978), were produced by the French studio Eurociné.

One of the most notorious films in this genre is La Bestia in Calore (also known as SS Hell Camp and The Beast In Heat), produced in Italy in 1977. German actress Macha Magall played Dr. Ellen Kratsch, another icy blond Nazi who is sexy, yet thoroughly evil. This film, with its extensive and graphic scenes of torture, brutality and rape, was initially banned in England. A milder, edited version was released in the U.S. as SS Experiment Camp 2. Magall was also in SS Girls (1977), another story set in a Nazi brothel.

The Nazi exploitation subgenre presented an opportunity for Italian studios to make very low-cost horror pictures whilst tapping a previously ignored market: the exploitation war film. The Italian films are different from "Ilsa" in many ways; for instance, they focus on far more extreme aspects of human abuse.

The films of 1976 include Sergio Garrone's SS Experiment Camp (also known as SS Experiment Love Camp), depicting soft-core sex scenes and the castration of an SS officer; SS Hell Camp, Luigi Batzella's second Nazi film, featured a sexually crazed mutant created by an Ilsa-like Nazi scientist; SS Girls, directed by Bruno Mattei, is a blatant copy of Salon Kitty. Mattei also made Women's Camp 119 starring Lorraine De Selle, a film based on actual documents which depicts horrific scientific experiments performed on prisoners; SS Special Section Women, which stars John Steiner as a sex-crazed SS commandant whose love for a Jewish girl causes him to be castrated as punishment; and Achtung! The Desert Tigers, from Luigi Batzella, which is interwoven with stock footage and scenes at a Nazi camp in the desert where tortures abound.

1977 saw the release of Gestapo's Last Orgy (also known as Last Orgy of the Third Reich and Caligula Reincarnated as Hitler), which depicts a love affair between a camp Commandant and a prisoner. SS Camp 5: Women’s Hell is SS Experiment Camp's sister film featuring the same cast and crew. Red Nights of the Gestapo is a soft-core sex film with SS soldiers abusing women in a castle. Nazi Love Camp 27, starring Sirpa Lane as a Jewish girl forced into a brothel, is notable for its hardcore sex scenes and for being written by famed scripter Gianfranco Clerici.

By the end of the decade the genre had run its course.

=== Nazi pornography ===
Adult films also exploited Nazi scenarios in a string of sadomasochistic "roughie" pornographic films in the 1970s and early 1980s. Examples include the Mitchell brothers' Hot Nazis, Hitler's Harlot (1973), and 1980's Nazi Love Island (also known as Prisoner of Paradise) with John Holmes and Seka. One of the last entries, Stalag 69 (1982), stars Angelique Pettyjohn as an Ilsa-type SS officer. The story was largely a remake of Love Camp 7, bringing the cycle back to its origins. The genre remained mostly dormant for the next two decades. In 2006, Mood Pictures, a Hungarian producer of S&M films, released Gestapo, Gestapo 2, and Dr. Mengele in 2008, all of which are set in a Nazi prison camp and pay homage to Ilsa and the Italian exploitation films.

=== Present ===
In 2007, as part of Robert Rodriguez and Quentin Tarantino's tribute to exploitation cinema, Grindhouse, director Rob Zombie created a trailer for a fake film called Werewolf Women of the SS, starring Nicolas Cage and Udo Kier. According to Zombie, "Basically, I had two ideas. It was either going to be a Nazi movie or a women-in-prison film, and I went with the Nazis. There's all those movies like Ilsa, She Wolf of the SS; Fräulein Devil; and Love Camp 7—I've always found that to be the most bizarre genre." On December 18, 2007, Zombie posted an entry on his MySpace page, asking if people would want to see a feature-length version of Werewolf Women of the SS. Iron Sky and Nazis at the Center of the Earth (both released in 2012) are in a similar vein.

== Themes ==
Most of the Nazi exploitation films have stalag settings with young female inmates like Women's Camp 119. Their tormentors are female or male Nazi officers in SS uniforms, usually speaking with a fake German accent and irrelevant or mispronounced German words, who often use "experiments" as excuses to implement sadistic physical violence (perhaps inspired by the work of people like Josef Mengele, who performed medical experiments that often killed people). There are scenes of sexual conduct or, more routinely, exposed nude bodies of the victimised inmates. The level of violence depicted in these films may often reach the level of gore.

This genre mainly focused on female SS officers. It presented them as lusty and buxom women, such as Dyanne Thorne's Ilsa, who also sexually abused their male prisoners (mainly in non-statutory female-on-male rape fashion). As the setting is a Stalag (prisoner-of-war camp), not a concentration camp, the prisoners are mainly Allied soldiers, not Jewish civilians.

There are also many films that do not follow the conventions of Nazi exploitation, such as Bordel SS (1978) of José Bénazéraf (one of the very few Nazi exploitation films to hold the dubious honor of having actual hardcore sex) and Salon Kitty (1976) of Tinto Brass. These films are not usually considered as "prototypical" Nazi exploitation films and qualify more for the "art house" subgenre. However, because of the vague term, even the film Il portiere di notte (The Night Porter) (1974) by Liliana Cavani that (in the opinion of many) lacks the exploitation motive, may be deemed one such film.

== Reception ==
Nazi exploitation is discussed by the critic Serge Daney in his article "Le travelling de Kapo": "It was Godard who, showing me a few tapes of "concentration camp porn" tucked away in a corner of his video library in Rolle, expressed surprise one day that no one had spoken out against such films or issued any bans. As if the baseness of their makers' intentions and the triviality of their consumers' fantasies somehow "protected" them from censorship and outrage."

Laura Frost's book Sex Drives: Fantasies of Fascism in Literary Modernism (2002) (ISBN 0801487641) says that the genre is part of a problematic attempt to link political deviance (i.e. fascism, militarism, genocide) with sexual deviance (i.e. sadomasochism, homosexuality, transvestism, pedophilia).

== Legal status in the United Kingdom ==
Sometime in the early 1980s, Nazi exploitation films made their way onto the British market, made popular by the growing VHS home video technology. With major Hollywood studios steering clear of the new format, it was left to small, domestic companies to populate the shelves with tapes. A small company from England, GO Video, purchased the rights to an Italian film named SS Experiment Camp. The company ran a marketing campaign with full-page ads showing a naked woman hanging from her feet, a swastika dangling from her wrist and an SS commander looming in the background. Advertisements for the film in video rental stores became a target for protestors, who picketed such stores and petitioned for the film to be banned. After the Video Recordings Act, most of the Nazi exploitation films (labelled 'Nazi Nasties') were denied BBFC classifications. The following Nazi exploitation films were taken off the shelves:

- SS Experiment Camp (SS Experiment/Lager SSadis Kastrat Kommandantur)
- The Beast In Heat (SS Hell Camp/La Bestia in Calore)
- Gestapo's Last Orgy (Last Orgy of The Third Reich/Caligula Reincarnated as Hitler/L'ultima orgia del III Reich). This was most recently, in 2021, refused a DVD release by the BBFC.
- Love Camp 7
- Deported Women of the SS Special Section (Le Deportate della sezione speciale SS)
- Nazi Love Camp 27 was refused a cinema certificate in 1977.

Of the above films, only SS Experiment Camp is now available in the U.K.

== Israeli literature ==
In Israel specifically, during the 1960s, "Stalag fiction" was pocket books whose stories focused on the unique features of this genre. The phenomenon took ground in parallel to the 1961 Eichmann trial. Sales of this pornographic literature broke all records in Israel as hundreds of thousands of copies were sold at kiosks. They were inspired by Ka-tzetnik 135633's House of Dolls, the experiences of a Jewish girl prostituted in the "Joy Division" (Block 24) of the Auschwitz camp, the factuality of which is disputed.

== See also ==
- Category:Nazi exploitation films
- Films dealing with Nazism and sexuality
- Nazi chic
- Nazi zombies
- Stalag fiction
- World War II in popular culture
- Waffen-SS in popular culture
- Nazi memorabilia
- Murderabilia
