= La gatta da pelare =

1981 film

- Directed by: Pippo Franco
- Written by: Giancarlo Magalli; Ugo Liberatore; Pippo Franco
- Produced by: Fulvio Lucisano
- Starring: Pippo Franco; Janet Ågren; Daniela Poggi
- Cinematography: Carlo Carlini
- Edited by: Antonio Siciliano
- Music by: Pippo Franco
- Release date: 1981
- Language: Italian

La gatta da pelare (A Hard Nut to Crack) is a 1981 Italian comedy film written, directed and starred by Pippo Franco. It is his only film as a director.

== Plot ==
A jealous cartoonist kills, in his comics, his wife's psychoanalyst. When the murder happens in reality, he is the main suspect.

== Cast ==
- Pippo Franco as Stefano Valenti
- Janet Ågren as Margaret
- Daniela Poggi as Luisa
- Franco Bisazza as the doorman
- Giancarlo Magalli as the captain of Carabinieri
- Nando Paone as Luigi Donizetti
- Stefano Ruzzante as Enzo Cantoni
- Tuccio Musumeci as Carlotti
- Orso Maria Guerrini as Professor Guido Maraldi
