= Fräulein Devil =

- Starring: Malisa Longo
- Release date: 1977
- Country: France

Fräulein Devil, also known as Captive Women 4, Elsa: Fraulein SS and Fraulein Kitty, is a 1977 French Nazi exploitation film.

== Plot ==
The movie stars Malisa Longo as the cruel Nazi Elsa, a former hooker with a penchant for S&M, a love for leather boots and nakedness, and a hatred of the French Resistance. It is set during the final days of World War II. The Third Reich plans to reward good Nazi officers and weed out traitors by sending a "Pleasure Train" through Europe. The train is populated by beautiful prostitutes who will service soldiers while gaining info on those who had betrayed the Reich.

== Cast ==
- Malisa Longo as Elsa Ackermann
- Olivier Mathot as Major Frantz Holbach
- Patrizia Gori as Liselotte Richter (credited as Patricia Gori)
- Pamela Stanford as Gundrun, The Singer
- Claudine Beccarie
- Erik Muller
- Rudy Lenoir as General Von Gluck
- Jean Le Boulbar as Werner (credited as Jean Leboulbard)
- Rene Gaillard as Mheim
- Thierry Dufour as Deserter
- Lynn Monteil as Blonde
- Roger Darton as Heim
- Daniel White as Officer At Piano
- Danielle Chenneviere (credited as Danielle Chennevieres)
- Rene Douglas as SS Officer
- Jacques Couderc as Resistance Fighter
- Claude Valmont as Officer
- Alain Delmer as Officer
- Ronald Weiss
- Adolf Hitler as Himself (archive footage) (uncredited)

== Background ==
Malisa Longo had previously played a small role in the successful 1976 film Salon Kitty, which landed her the lead roles in two French imitation films, Fräulein Devil and Helga, She Wolf of Spilberg, both of which were shot back-to-back in 1977; the former was shot on the same sets as Train Spécial Pour SS (aka Hitler's Lust Train), a nearly identical film without Longo's involvement from a few months previously. All three films utilized the same director, crew, and supporting cast.

The trio of French films follows the formula of the 1974 hit Ilsa, She Wolf of the SS which starred Dyanne Thorne as a brutal prison camp commandant. However, Fräulein Devil also borrowed some plot and stylistic elements from Salon Kitty, which allowed the film to be successfully advertised in both North American and European markets with separate emphasis: the "war adventure stories" style of the Ilsa series in the former and the Nazi brothel gimmick in the latter.

== Reception ==
Retrospective reviews at the time of the home video releases state that "Elsa Fraulein SS has its moments, and is certainly watchable as one of a questionable sub-genre of films", that "it is tame compared with the majority of other Nazisploitation that were popular at the time, and even the sex and violence is neither titillating or shocking" or that "For the most part, (the film) is slow and plodding like many of the other movies from Eurocine though this film is definitely a step up from the terrible Helga She-Wolf of Stilberg."
