= SS Experiment Camp =

- British video release poster
- Directed by: Sergio Garrone
- Written by: Sergio Chiusi; Vinicio Marinucci; Sergio Garrone
- Starring: Mircha Carven; Paola Corazzi; Giorgio Cerioni
- Cinematography: Maurizio Centini
- Edited by: Cesare Bianchini
- Music by: Vasili Kojucharov; Roberto Pregadio
- Distributed by: Variety Distribution
- Release date: 1976
- Running time: 95 minutes
- Country: Italy
- Language: Italian

SS Experiment Camp (also known as SS Experiment Love Camp; original release title: Lager SSadis Kastrat Kommandantur) is a 1976 Nazi exploitation film directed by Sergio Garrone. The plot concerns non-consensual sexual experimenting with female prisoners of a concentration camp run by Colonel von Kleiben (Giorgio Cerioni), a Nazi officer who needs a testicle transplant after being castrated by a Russian girl. It gained infamy in the 1980s for its controversial themes and a public advertising campaign that involved obscene, suggestive posters. The film was banned in some countries, including the United Kingdom, where the film was subject to prosecution as one of the films known as "video nasties"; a title used in the press and by campaigners that came to be used for a list of films that could be found obscene under the Obscene Publications Act.

== Cast ==
- Mircha Carven as Helmut
- Giorgio Cerioni as Col. Von Kleiben
- Paola Corazzi as Mirelle
- Giovanna Mainardi as
- Serafino Profumo as The Sergeant
- Attilio Dottesio as Dr. Steiner
- Patrizia Melega Dr. Renke
- Almina De Sanzio
- Matilde Dall'Aglio as
- Agnes Kalpagos as Margot

== Controversy ==
Bizarre Magazine, in a 2004 overview of the Naziploitation genre, said the following: "Its advertising campaign, an image of a semi-naked woman hanging upside-down from a crucifix, was instrumental in bringing unwanted attention to the Nasties, although, beyond that, its infamy is unwarranted". A similar view of it was taken by the British Board of Film Classification, who passed it uncut the next year, noting "Despite the questionable taste of basing an exploitation film in a concentration camp, the sexual activity itself was consensual and the level of potentially eroticised violence sufficiently limited".

However, it was denounced in by the Sunday Times and Sunday Express at the time of Holocaust Memorial Day, and cited by MPs Julian Brazier and Keith Vaz as part of their attempts to tighten the film banning system.

In France, on 1977, this movie was refused a certificate for unduly exploiting the subject of Nazi tortures.
