= The Last Desperate Hours =

- Directed by: Giorgio Stegani
- Screenplay by: Giovanni Addessi; Camillo Bazzoni; Franco Barbaresi
- Story by: Giovanni Addessi; Camillo Bazzoni; Franco Barbaresi
- Produced by: Giovanni Addessi
- Starring: Antonio Sabàto; Silvia Monti; Pier Paolo Capponi
- Cinematography: Aldo De Robertis; Sandro Mancori
- Edited by: Otello Colangeli
- Music by: Gianni Marchetti
- Production company: Cristiana Cinematografica
- Distributed by: Overseas Film Company
- Release date: 29 November 1974
- Running time: 94 minutes
- Country: Italy
- Box office: ₤560.728 million

The Last Desperate Hours (Italian: Milano: il clan dei calabresi) is a 1974 Italian poliziottesco film directed by Giorgio Stegani.

== Cast ==
- Antonio Sabàto: Paolo Mancuso
- Silvia Monti: Laura Monachesi
- Pier Paolo Capponi: Police Commissioner
- Nicoletta Rizzi: Lidia Mancuso
- Toni Ucci: Ugo Merenda
- Peter Carsten: Maraschi

== Production ==
The film was shot on location in Milan and in Incir-De Paolis Studios in Rome.

== Release ==
The Last Desperate Hours was released in Italy on November 29, 1974, where it was distributed by the Overseas Film Company. It grossed a total of 560.728 million Italian lire on its release.

== Reception ==
In his book Italian Crime Filmography 1968-1980, Roberto Curti noted that "the sociological ambitions end up in excruciating banalities, such as the confrontation between Mancuso and his poor but honest wife (Nicoletta Rizzi)"

The score by Gianni Marchetti was re-used partially in the films Emanuelle's Revenge by Joe D'Amato and SS Girls by Bruno Mattei.

== See also ==
- List of Italian films of 1974

== Notes ==
=== References ===
- Curti, Roberto (2013). Italian Crime Filmography, 1968-1980. McFarland. ISBN 978-0786469765.
