= Emanuelle's Revenge =

- Directed by: Joe D'Amato
- Screenplay by: Bruno Mattei; Joe D'Amato
- Produced by: Joe D'Amato
- Starring: George Eastman; Rosemarie Lindt; Patricia Gori; Karole Annie Edel
- Cinematography: Joe D'Amato
- Edited by: Vincenzo Vanni
- Music by: Gianni Marchetti
- Production company: Matra Cinematografica
- Distributed by: Variety Distribution
- Release date: 1975
- Running time: 96 minutes
- Country: Italy

Emanuelle's Revenge (Italian: Emanuelle e Françoise le sorelline, lit. 'Emanuelle and Francene, the Sisters', released in the UK as Emanuelle and Francoise) is an Italian film directed by Joe D'Amato. It is a remake of the Greek film The Wild Pussycat (1969). Unlike the French Emmanuelle series, to which it refers only in name, Emanuelle's Revenge has been described as being close to a sex-themed giallo, or as a combination of several genres: the rape and revenge film, the splatter film, the erotic film and the thriller. The film was written by Bruno Mattei and D'Amato. Bruno Mattei co-directed the film with D'Amato, but only D'Amato was credited.

== Plot ==
A young woman named Francoise, who is abused and degraded by her gambler-husband Carlo, eventually kills herself by jumping in front of a train. Her sister Emanuelle avenges Francoise's death by drugging Carlo and chaining him in a hidden soundproof room with a two-way mirror, and torturing him by having sex with various men and women in front of the mirror, making him watch the torrid goings on without being able to participate. She also injects him with LSD and causes him to hallucinate scenes of cannibalistic orgies. While he is still locked in the hidden room, Carlo also hallucinates hacking Emanuelle to death with a meat cleaver.

As the coup de grace of her plan, Emanuelle enters the room and attempts to castrate Carlo with a scalpel, at which point he breaks free of his bonds and chases her around the house. Carlo eventually catches Emanuelle and butchers her in real life on her living room rug, when suddenly the police arrive at the house, alerted to the melee by a neighbor. Carlo retreats back into the hidden room and seals himself in to evade the police while they check the crime scene for evidence and cart poor Emanuelle off to the morgue, not realizing the killer is hiding behind the two-way mirror in the living room. Emanuelle's real revenge over Carlo occurs after her death, when Carlo realizes he locked himself in the hidden room without any water or food and the police have locked up the house as a crime scene for 30 days.

== Cast ==
- Rosemarie Lindt as Emanuelle
- George Eastman as Carlo
- Patrizia Gori as Françoise (credited as Francene)
- Annie Carol Edel as Mira (credited as Karole Annie Edel)
- Maria Rosaria Riuzzi as Pamela (credited as Mary Kristal)
- Massimo Vanni as Robi
- Eolo Capritti as Bald Film Producer (credited as Al Capri)
- Giorgio Fieri as Alfredo (credited as Giorgio Fleri)
- Luciano Rossi as Card Player (uncredited)
- Brigitte Lahaie (added scenes found in German cut only)

== Production ==
According to Bruno Mattei, the idea for the film was born when producer Franco Gaudenzi wanted to distribute a Greek pornographic film by Dimis Dadiras entitled The Wild Pussycat. Due to its explicit nature, the film would not have passed Italian censorship, which led to D'Amato and Mattei deciding to shoot a remake of it.

Parts of the score in Emanuelle's Revenge were reused from Gianni Marchetti's music for The Last Desperate Hours and Summer Affair (Il sole nella pelle).

== Release ==
Emanuelle's Revenge passed the Italian censorship board on November 5, 1975. According to Marco Giusti, some scenes of lesbian and anal intercourse were removed.

In 1978, Erwin C. Dietrich bought the film, reedited it adding hardcore inserts with Brigitte Lahaie, dubbed it into German and replaced the original music with a score by Walter Baumgartner. This version was released under the German title Foltergarten der Sinnlichkeit (literally: Torture garden of sensuality). A VHS-release of this version was titled Die Lady mit der Pussycat.

== Reception ==
In a contemporary review, David Badder (Monthly Film Bulletin) stated that the film had characters that eschewed "any believable motivation", that "deadly dull sex scenes irritatingly tricked out with arty-crafty camera work, almost guaranteed to send the bulk of his frustrated audience into a deep sleep" and that the film was "burdened with a crushingly pretentious score". The review negatively compared D'Amato's work to that of Italian genre filmmakers Dario Argento and Riccardo Freda, stating that he had "none of [their] inspirational touches".

In his 1999 book on the film's director Joe D'Amato, Antonio Tentori found that it skilfully combined eros and horror.
