= Piero Ciampi =

Italian singer-songwriter

Piero Ciampi (Livorno, 28 September 1934 – Rome, 19 January 1980) was an Italian singer-songwriter.

== Biography ==
=== Adolescence and early musical experiences ===
Piero Ciampi was born in Livorno, on Via Roma, facing the birthplace of Amedeo Modigliani, from his father's second marriage, a leather merchant. During the Second World War, following the bombings on the city, the Ciampi family evacuated to the countryside near Pisa, returning to Livorno only several years after the end of the conflict. That initial tragic bombing of the city completely devastated the port area, causing almost six thousand casualties. Nevertheless, Livorno remained his reference city, even though Piero had to leave it for the first time in 1943.

In 1948, he enrolled at the "Vittorio Veneto" Scientific High School in Milan, hosted by his paternal aunt. Upon reaching the fifth year, after various attempts between public and private schools, he failed to obtain his diploma. Returning to Livorno, he formed a musical trio with his brothers Roberto and Paolo, where he tried his hand at singing. During this period, he supported himself by working in a lubricant oil company at the port until he received the call for military service.

He performed his military service in Pesaro, where, during free evenings, he played in local venues with three fellow soldiers, including Gian Franco Reverberi. Already during this period, as Reverberi recounted, his quarrelsome character began to manifest; "charming man and poet, he could evoke both hatred and love. The commander's daughter fell in love with him during that time, to whom Ciampi wrote letters every day." According to Reverberi, "not even Cyrano de Bergerac could have done better.

=== The Parisian period ===
Upon returning to Livorno, he began playing the double bass (an instrument he taught himself) in small ensembles in the area. However, driven by restlessness and economic necessity, in 1957, he headed to Genoa, where he reunited with Reverberi and formed a friendship with the painter Federico Sirigu. Later, he moved to Paris, where he started shaping his own musical style characterised by "twilight atmospheres, sparse verses, pathos," and performed with a hoarse and cavernous voice. These songs were later reconsidered in the context of the vibrant singer-songwriter era of the time. Despite this creatively fruitful period, he lived in poverty, singing his poems—often written just hours before performing—in exchange for fees barely sufficient for sustenance. Nevertheless, he made a name for himself in some Parisian cultural circles where they began to call him "l'italianó"; in this context, he met Louis-Ferdinand Céline and became an admirer of Georges Brassens. During his time in Paris, he had the opportunity to meet and befriend Leonard Cohen, whom he would encounter again in Rome years later.

== Discography ==
=== Single ===
- 1961: Conphiteor/La grotta dell'amore (Bluebell, BB 03044; inciso come Piero Litaliano)
- 1961: L'ultima volta che la vidi/Quando il vento si leva (Bluebell, BB 03056; inciso come Piero Litaliano)
- October 1961: Fino all'ultimo minuto/Qualcuno tornerà (CGD, N 9310; inciso come Piero Litaliano)
- October 1961: Autunno a Milano/Hai lasciato a casa il tuo sorriso (CGD, N 9311; inciso come Piero Litaliano)
- January 1962: Confesso/Non siamo tutti eroi (CGD, N 9325; inciso come Piero Litaliano)
- March 1962: Lungo treno del Sud/Non siamo tutti eroi (CGD, N 9331; inciso come Piero Litaliano)
- 1962: Fra cent'anni/Confesso (CGD, N 9369; inciso come Piero Litaliano)
- October 1962: Alé Alé/Fra cent'anni (CGD, N 9402; inciso come Piero Litaliano)
- 1963: Un giorno o l'altro ti lascerò/E va bene (Ariel, NF 501)
- 1965: Ho bisogno di vederti/Chieder perdono non è peccato (Ariel, NF 509)
- 1970: Tu no/Barbara non-c'è (Det, DTP 59)
- 1971: L'amore è tutto qui/Il vino (Amico ZF 50173)
- 1972: Il giocatore/40 soldati 40 sorelle (Amico ZSLF 50219)
- 1973: Io e te, Maria/Te lo faccio vedere chi sono io (Amico ZSLF 50276)
- January 1975: Andare camminare lavorare/Cristo tra i chitarristi (RCA Italiana TPBO 1081; promo TPBO 1091)
- February 1975: Andare camminare lavorare/Quando finisce un amore (RCA Italiana TPJB 1101) (per juke-box; lato B cantato da Riccardo Cocciante)
- 1975: Uffa che noia/Canto una suora (promo, RCA Italiana TPBO 1178)

=== EP ===
- October 1961: Fino all'ultimo minuto/Qualcuno tornerà/Autunno a Milano/Hai lasciato a casa il tuo sorriso (CGD, E 6100)

=== LP e CD ===
- 1963: Piero Litaliano (CGD, FG 5007)
- 1971: Piero Ciampi (Amico ZSLF 55041)
- February 1973: Io e te abbiamo perso la bussola (Amico DZSLF 55133)
- 1975: Andare camminare lavorare e altri discorsi (RCA Italiana TPL1 1109)
- 1976: Dentro e fuori (album doppio, 1976) (RCA Italiana TCL2 1184)
- 1992: Il disco (Arcana; CD con cinque brani inediti del periodo RCA)

=== Live ===
- 1995: Live al Tenco '76, inediti e provini (Papiro, PA 0011295)
- 2010: E continuo a cantare. Piero Ciampi live (Promo Music/Edel) (CD doppio: nel primo disco Ciampi live nel 1976 al Club Tenco e al "Ciucheba" di Castiglioncello; nel secondo disco omaggio live di artisti vari del 2008 al Teatro Regio di Parma)

=== Anthology ===
- 1981: Le carte in regola (RCA Italiana – Lineatre NL 33178)
- 1990: L'album di Piero Ciampi (LP triplo/CD doppio con sette inediti, RCA NL 74506 (3))
- 1995: Piero Ciampi (All the best) (CD RCA 74321 32947 2)
- 1997: Il mondo di Piero Ciampi (CD RCA Italiana – Lineatre 74321 51245 2)
- 2000: Non siamo tutti eroi (On Sale Music 52 OSM 049)
- 2010: Piero Ciampi, le canzoni e le sue storie (CD + DVD) (Sony Music 88697651802)
- 2010: Piero Ciampi (Record Service)

=== Tributes ===
- 1992: Te lo faccio vedere chi sono io! Gli amici cantano Piero Ciampi (BLU 004 CD) (19 artisti live al Teatro Argentina di Roma nel 1990)
- 2000: Inciampando (Interbeat) (14 artisti live al Teatro Brancaccio di Roma nel 1995)
- 2012: Cosa resta di Piero Ciampi (Arroyo Records) (18 artisti live al Premio Ciampi in vari anni)
- 2013: Reinciampando. Atto primo (CD doppio Interbeat, INT0112) (contiene i tributi all'Argentina del 1990 e al Brancaccio del 1995)

== Books ==
- Canzoni e poesie, Roma, Lato side, 1980.
- Ho solo la faccia di un uomo. Poesie e racconti inediti, Marano Lagunare, GET, 1985.
- Tutta l'opera, Milano, Arcana, 1992. ISBN 88-7966-006-3.

== Rarity ==
- Remolo e Romo
- Fantaradio con Renato Zero
- Rettilario

== Bibliography ==
- Enrico De Angelis, Piero Ciampi. Canzoni e poesie, Roma/Sanremo. Lato Side, 1980
- Enrico De Angelis, Piero Ciampi. Tutta l'opera, Milano, Arcana Editore, 1992. ISBN 88-7966-006-3
- Giuseppe De Grassi, Maledetti amici. Cronache di vita, amore e canzoni d'intorno a Piero Ciampi, Roma, Rai Eri, 2001. ISBN 88-397-1150-3
- Gisela Scerman, Piero Ciampi, una vita a precipizio. Il cantautore livornese raccontato dagli amici, Roma, Coniglio Editore, 2005. ISBN 88-88833-57-9
- Enrico Deregibus (a cura di), Dizionario completo della canzone italiana, Firenze, Giunti, 2006, ad vocem. ISBN 978-88-09-04602-3
- Enrico De Angelis, con Ugo Marcheselli, Piero Ciampi. Discografia illustrata, Roma, Coniglio Editore, 2008. ISBN 978-88-6063-173-2
- Gianni Marchetti, Il mio Piero Ciampi. Pagine di un incontro, Roma, Coniglio Editore, 2010. ISBN 978-88-6063-233-3
- Gisela Scerman, Piero Ciampi. Maledetto poeta, Roma, Arcana, 2012. ISBN 978-88-6231-277-6
- Enzo Gentile, Lontani dagli occhi. Vita, sorte e miracoli di artisti esemplari, Laurana Editore, 2015; capitolo Una vita come un romanzo, pagg. 59–83
