= Malisa Longo =

Italian actress, model and writer (born 1950)

- Born: Maria Luisa Longo; 13 July 1950 (age 75); Venice, Italy
- Occupation: Actress
- Spouse: Riccardo Billi

Malisa Longo (born Maria Luisa Longo; 13 July 1950) is an Italian actress, model and writer.

== Life and career ==
Born Maria Luisa Longo in Venice, Italy, she moved to Rome at a young age where she started a career as a model. She entered the Miss Italia beauty contest, winning the Miss Cinema and Miss Lazio titles. After appearing in a number of commercials, she made her acting debut in 1968 in the Antonio Margheriti's giallo film The Young, the Evil and the Savage. She then appeared in other films, sometimes in main roles, and was especially active in the Nazi exploitation and commedia sexy all'italiana genres.

She performed a cameo in Bruce Lee's film The Way of the Dragon.

Longo was directed three times by the master of Italian erotica, Tinto Brass, in films such as Salon Kitty (1976) and Miranda (1985), in which she played opposite Serena Grandi.

She retired from acting in 1997. In 2000 she debuted as a writer with the novel Così come sono, and her works include poetries (Il cantico del corpo) and essays (Aggiungi un seggio a tavola).

== Family ==
She is married to the producer Riccardo Billi. (Note: The producer Riccardo Billi is not the actor who worked in tandem with Mario Riva, but a homonym)

== Selected filmography ==
- The Young, the Evil, and the Savage (1968) aka Naked... You Die
- A Girl Called Jules (1970)
- More Dollars for the MacGregors (1970)
- La banda de los tres crisantemos (1970)
- Blindman (1971)
- The Way of the Dragon (1972)
- The Ribald Decameron (1972)
- The Sicilian Connection (1972)
- Naughty Nun (1972)
- Ricco the Mean Machine (1973)
- War Goddess (1973) aka The Bare Breasted Warriors
- Il domestico (1974)
- Super Stooges vs. the Wonder Women (1974)
- White Fang and the Hunter (1975)
- L'adolescente (1976)
- Salon Kitty (1976)
- Mark Strikes Again (1976)
- Emmanuelle bianca e nera (1976)
- Loves, Beds and Betrayals (1977)
- Fraulein Kitty (1977)
- California (1977)
- Helga, She Wolf of Stilberg (1977)
- El Macho (1977)
- War of the Robots (1978) aka Reactor
- Star Odyssey (1979)
- The Iron Hand of the Mafia (1980)
- La dottoressa ci sta col colonnello (1980)
- Gunan, King of the Barbarians (1982) aka Gunan the Warrior, The Invincible Barbarian
- The Red Monks) (1989)
- A Cat in the Brain (1990) aka Nightmare Concert
- Desiderable Teacher 3 (1990) (the two previous was with the actor, Riccardo Billi)
