= Salon Kitty (film) =

1976 film by Tinto Brass

- Italian film poster
- Directed by: Tinto Brass
- Screenplay by: Ennio De Concini; Maria Pia Fusco; Tinto Brass
- Story by: Antonio Colantuoni; Ennio De Concini; Maria Pia Fusco
- Based on: Salon Kitty by Peter Norden
- Produced by: Ermanno Donati; Giulio Sbarigia
- Starring: Helmut Berger; Ingrid Thulin; Teresa Ann Savoy; John Steiner; Sara Sperati; Maria Michi; Rosemarie Lindt; Paola Senatore; John Ireland; Tina Aumont; Alexandra Bogojevic; Stefano Satta Flores; Bekim Fehmiu
- Cinematography: Silvano Ippoliti
- Edited by: Tinto Brass
- Music by: Fiorenzo Carpi
- Production companies: Coralta Produzioni Internazionali Cinematografica S.r.l.; Cinema Seven Film GmbH & Co. 1 KG; Les Fox Productions Europa
- Distributed by: Titanus (Italy); Cinerama Filmgesellschaft (West Germany); 20th Century-Fox (International)
- Release dates: 2 March 1976 (Italy); 26 March 1976 (West Germany); 23 July 1976 (France)
- Running time: 130 minutes
- Countries: Italy; West Germany; France
- Languages: Italian; English; German

Salon Kitty is a 1976 erotic war drama film directed and edited by Tinto Brass, from a screenplay co-written with Ennio De Concini and Maria Pia Fusco. It stars Helmut Berger, Ingrid Thulin, Teresa Ann Savoy, John Steiner, John Ireland, Stefano Satta Flores, Tina Aumont and Bekim Fehmiu.

The film is based on the book of the same name by journalist Joseph Fritz (under the pen name 'Peter Norden'), covering the real life events of the Salon Kitty operation, under which the Sicherheitsdienst took over an expensive brothel in Berlin, had the place wire tapped, and replaced all the prostitutes with trained spies, in order to gather information on various members of the Nazi party and foreign dignitaries. Berger plays a fictionalized version of SS officer Walter Schellenberg, who oversaw the operation, and Thulin plays the brothel's madam.

Salon Kitty was a co-production between Italian, West German, and French companies. It is considered among the progenitors of the Nazisploitation genre. In the US, the film was edited to lighten the political overtones for an easier marketing as a sexploitation film and released under the title Madam Kitty with an X rating.

== Plot ==
Helmut Wallenberg, an ambitious Nazi SS commandant, devises a plan to select a special group of female informants in order to plant them as prostitutes in a high class brothel on the eve of World War II in order to collect intelligence on various important members of the Nazi party and foreign dignitaries who frequent the establishment. The selected SS auxiliaries are group-tested with SS men to assess their suitability. The brothel is then purged of its regular workers. Kitty (Ingrid Thulin), the owner and Madam of the brothel, initially despairs of the spies' abilities and has to train them up. The building gets wiretapped with listening devices and other surveillance equipment, after which the new women proceed to spy on their illustrious clients.

The operation seems to yield results but takes a toll on the women. One falls pregnant and refuses to abort the baby: Wallenberg has her removed from duty and handed over for medical experimentation. Another woman suffers an epileptic fit and is taken away by Wallenberg's men, while a third hangs herself. One of the informants, Margherita, who is Wallenerg's favourite, falls in love with a client, Luftwaffe pilot Hans Reiter. Over the first few months of the war, he becomes disillusioned with what he has seen at the front and confesses to Margherita that he plans to defect. She submits a report claiming he is a devout National Socialist, but his confession is picked up on a recording. Later, another one of Margherita's clients tells her that he has been arrested and executed and that he personally spat on the corpse. Margherita spontaneously shoots him while he is in the shower and Kitty makes it look like a suicide.

After the killing, Margherita takes an unauthorised break from the brothel to visit her parents, who don't know what her work entails but become suspicious when Kitty visits. Kitty asks Margherita to return to work, saying she can't cover for her much longer and her absence will become suspicious. Margherita angrily condemns Kitty for her involvement in the operation, but realises that she knew nothing about it: Kitty thought the Nazis had merely commandeered her brothel for their own use and was unaware of the surveillance and reports.

Around the time of the fall of Paris in June 1940, Kitty and Margherita discover the bugging devices and determine that the bathrooms are not wired. With the help of Dino, an Italian friend of Kitty, they acquire their own recording device. Margherita entraps Wallenberg into a recording where he tells her that his wife's father was Jewish, that he does not believe in National Socialism, and that he has the dirt on all the top Nazi hierarchy and intends to bring them all down. Margherita takes the recording to Wallenberg's colleagues in the SS, and he is immediately apprehended and shot. Kitty and Margherita celebrate, as the first bombs start to fall on Berlin.

== Cast ==
- Helmut Berger as Helmut Wallenberg (based on Walter Schellenberg)
- Ingrid Thulin as Kitty Kellermann (Kitty Schmidt)
  - Annie Ross as Kellermann's singing voice
- Teresa Ann Savoy as Margherita
- John Steiner as the Blonde
- Bekim Fehmiu as Captain Hans Reiter
- John Ireland as Cliff
- Stefano Satta Flores as Dino
- Tina Aumont as Herta Wallenberg
- Sara Sperati as Helga, the dominatrix
- Maria Michi as Ilde
- Rosemarie Lindt as Susan
- Paola Senatore as Marika
- Alexandra Bogojevic as Gloria
- Dan van Husen as Sergeant Rauss
- Luciano Rossi as Dr. Schwab
- Clara Colosimo as Female dinner guest
- Giancarlo Badessi as Officer with projector
- Malisa Longo and Patrizia Webley as New Kitty girls

Uncredited

- Aldo Valletti as Dart-throwing client
- Salvatore Baccaro as Neanderthal prisoner
- Geoffrey Copleston as Male dinner guest
- Tom Felleghy and John Bartha as Gestapo officers

== Production ==
Salon Kitty was filmed mostly at Dear Studios in Rome, with some additional location filming in West Germany. Production designer Ken Adam had recently suffered a nervous breakdown while working on Barry Lyndon, and he described his participation in this film as creatively regenerative. He has stated that the production was enjoyable, and that he feels Salon Kitty is "underrated." Adam based his design of Wallenberg's apartment on his own memories of his family's apartment in World War II-era Berlin. Wallenberg's enormous office, though a set, allegedly features a real marble floor, as it was cheaper to use real marble than create a mock-up version.

Costumes and uniforms for the film were designed by Ugo Pericoli and Jost Jacob, and were constructed by Tirelli Costumi of Rome. Adam credited Jacob with the design of the 'kinky' uniforms that Wallenberg wears throughout the film.

== Release ==
Salon Kitty was released in Italy on 2 March 1976.

=== Home media ===
The uncut director's cut was released on Blu-Ray and DVD by Blue Underground in November 2010. Blue Underground surrendered the original X rating for an unrated release. For the film's 50th anniversary, a newly-remastered Blu-Ray was released by Cult Films in November 2026.

== Reception ==
In a review at the time of the UK release, the Monthly Film Bulletin found the film to contain "a script that does nothing more than pile up the perversions as fast as possible (the characterisation hardly rises above the stock Nazi heavy while the motivation is consistently, and laughably, crude)" and hoped that "Italian directors will soon examine their recent track record of the atrocities of Nazi Germany (The Damned, The Night Porter, and now Salon Kitty) and abandon the subject for a long while to come."

On the review aggregator website Rotten Tomatoes, 29% of 7 critics' reviews are positive, with an average rating of 5.2/10.

== See also ==
- List of Italian films of 1976
