= Helga, She Wolf of Stilberg =

1977 film directed by Alain Payet

- Poster
- Directed by: Alain Payet
- Starring: Malisa Longo
- Release date: 1977
- Language: French

Helga, She-Wolf of Stilberg (French: Helga, la louve de Stilberg) is a 1977 Nazisploitation French film directed by Alain Payet (credited as Alain Garnier).

== Plot ==
The film is set in the late 1970s in a South American Banana Republic. President Steiner sends all political prisoners to a fortress he has transformed in concentration camp and named Stilberg. He names Helga as head of the camp. The latter imposes harsh and perverse discipline to the prisoners. A new captive arrives, Elisabeth (Lisbeth), daughter of the leader of the political opposition forces. Helga soon falls in love with her.

== Cast ==
- Malisa Longo: Helga
- Patrizia Gori: Elisabeth Vogel
- Claude Janna: a prisoner
- Dominique Aveline: Hugo Lombardi
- Olivier Mathot: General Gomez

== Production ==
The film was a Eurociné production.

== Reception ==
Retrospective reviews were very negative, including one criticising both the characterisation and the plot: "Not only (are) its characters and antagonist one dimensional to the point of being a joke, the story seems to lack an actual plot or driving narrative. In the beginning, disgruntled that one of the leaders has convinced President Steiner to send her away to Stilberg, Helga has plans to do away with Steiner’s chief commander by way of a sex scandal and return to a prominent role within the party. Her position at Stilberg is, to her at least, meant to be a temporary one which she has no interest in but once the film settles into its new location of Stilberg, it seems content to just stay there. The plot then runs through the cycle of a selected girl being raped by Doc the farmer in exchange for a couple of bottles of his finest wine, Helga summoning women for her own satisfaction, dorm room discussions between the female prisoners and the odd whipping of an uncompliant prisoner. It’s dull as dishwater to watch". Another recent review finds that the film, which it finds deplorable and poorly acted, has a stronger emphasis on lesbian scenes than most of the films of the genre.

== See also ==
- Ilsa, She Wolf of the SS; Ilsa, the Wicked Warden, of the Ilsa series, to which the promotional message for Helga She-Wolf of Stilberg compared the film
