= Il tifoso, l'arbitro e il calciatore =

- Italian theatrical release poster by Enzo Sciotti
- Directed by: Pier Francesco Pingitore
- Written by: Pier Francesco Pingitore; Luciano Martino; Francesco Milizia
- Starring: Pippo Franco; Alvaro Vitali
- Cinematography: Federico Zanni
- Music by: Dimitri Gribanovski
- Release date: 1983
- Language: Italian

Il tifoso, l'arbitro e il calciatore (The Supporter, the Referee and the Footballer) is a 1983 Italian comedy film written and directed by Pier Francesco Pingitore.

== Cast ==
Segment L'arbitro e il calciatore

- Alvaro Vitali as Alvaro Presutti
- Carmen Russo as Manuela Presutti
- Enzo Cannavale as Sposito
- Marisa Merlini as The Mother-in-law
- Marco Gelardini as Walter Grass
- Luigi Montini as Dr. Moroni

Segment Il tifoso

- Pippo Franco as Amedeo
- Daniela Poggi as Patrizia Pecorazzi
- Mario Carotenuto as Sor Memmo
- Gigi Reder as Commendator Pecorazzi
- Lucio Montanaro as Bazzettone
- Roberto Della Casa as Sportelli
- Gianfranco Barra as Capo del personale
- Franco Caracciolo as Armando Sgabelloni

== See also ==
- List of Italian films of 1983
