= Ready for Anything =

- Directed by: Giorgio Stegani
- Written by: Giorgio Stegani; Roberto Gianviti
- Starring: Eleonora Giorgi; Bekim Fehmiu
- Cinematography: Sandro Mancori
- Music by: Gianni Marchetti
- Distributed by: Variety Distribution
- Release date: 1977
- Language: Italian

Ready for Anything (Italian: Disposta a tutto) is a 1977 Italian romance film written and directed by Giorgio Stegani and starring Eleonora Giorgi and Bekim Fehmiu.

== Cast ==
- Eleonora Giorgi as Anna
- Bekim Fehmiu as Marco
- Barbara Magnolfi as Paola
- Laura De Marchi as Marco's Wife
- Vittorio Duse as The Butler
