= La Bestia in calore =

1977 Italian exploitation film

- Directed by: Luigi Batzella
- Screenplay by: Luigi Batzella
- Story by: Luigi Batzella
- Starring: Macha Magall
- Cinematography: Ugo Brunelli
- Edited by: Luigi Batzella
- Music by: Giuliano Sorgini
- Production company: Eterna Film
- Distributed by: Indipendenti Regionali
- Release date: 1977
- Country: Italy

La Bestia in calore (lit. 'The Beast in Heat') is a 1977 Italian exploitation film starring Macha Magall, and directed, written, and edited by Luigi Batzella.

== Plot ==
A beautiful yet nefarious female SS officer and doctor, Ellen Kratsch (Magall), creates a genetic, incubus-like mutant human beast (Baccaro) in a castle in occupied Europe. The beast is a rapacious, squat sex fiend, which she uses to torture and molest female prisoners as part of a new medical experiment. The dwarfish beast is kept on a diet of mega-aphrodisiacs. In addition to the beast, as the Nazis battle a local insurgency, captives of both genders are stripped naked and forced to endure various torture and interrogation, including electric shocks, systematic rape by the beast, finger-nail pulling, castration, and beatings.

During the film's climax, the partisans attack the castle, and Kratsch is given to the beast in revenge.

== Cast ==
- Macha Magall as Dr. Ellen Kratsch
- Gino Turini as Drago (credited as John Brawn)
- Edilio Kim as Captain Hardinghauser (credited as Kim Gatti)
- Xiro Papas as Lupo (as Xiros Papas)
- Brad Harris as Don Lorenzo
- Michel Qisi as Young Child
- Salvatore Baccaro as The Beast (credited as Sal Boris)
- Brigitte Skay as Irene (uncredited)

== Production ==
Most, if not all, of the battle scenes showing partisans attacking the Germans were taken from a previous war film directed by Batzella, Quando suona la campana.

== Style ==
La bestia in calore was part of a sub-genre of exploitation films created in the early 1970s called Naziploitation. These films were primarily produced in the United States and Italy. Among the films, particularly the ones produced in Italy such as Captive Women 4, Gestapo's Last Orgy and La bestia in calore often include pornographic scenes, but were described by author Michael D. Richardson as perhaps "better classified as horror films, given the excessive and graphic violence that dominated the screen."

== Release ==
The film was passed by Italian censors on 10 June 1977. Along with Batzella's other Nazi-themed film, Kaput Lager - Gli ultimi giorni delle SS, the film was released in 1977. The film's theatrical release in the United States was heavily edited. The film has been released under the titles SS Hell Camp, SS Experiment Part 2 and Horrifying Experiments of SS Last Days.

== Reception ==
Tim Lucas wrote in Sight & Sound that the film was "so reprehensible that there's not a single real name associated with it" noting the director Paolo Solvay credited as Ivan Kathansky and that the film "doesn't have anything as impressive to offer as the prodigiously endowed torso of Dyanne Thorne in the 'Ilsa' concentration-camp series, so its cup runneth over with mayhem instead. A woman's hand is manacled to a table, covered in blood, as a Nazi torturer uses pliers to pluck one fingernail after another." Danny Shipka, author of Perverse Titilation, a book about European exploitation cinema described the film a "patchwork of bad editing, bad acting and hilarious plot ideas all designed to entertain."
