= Daniela Poggi =

Italian actress (born 1954)

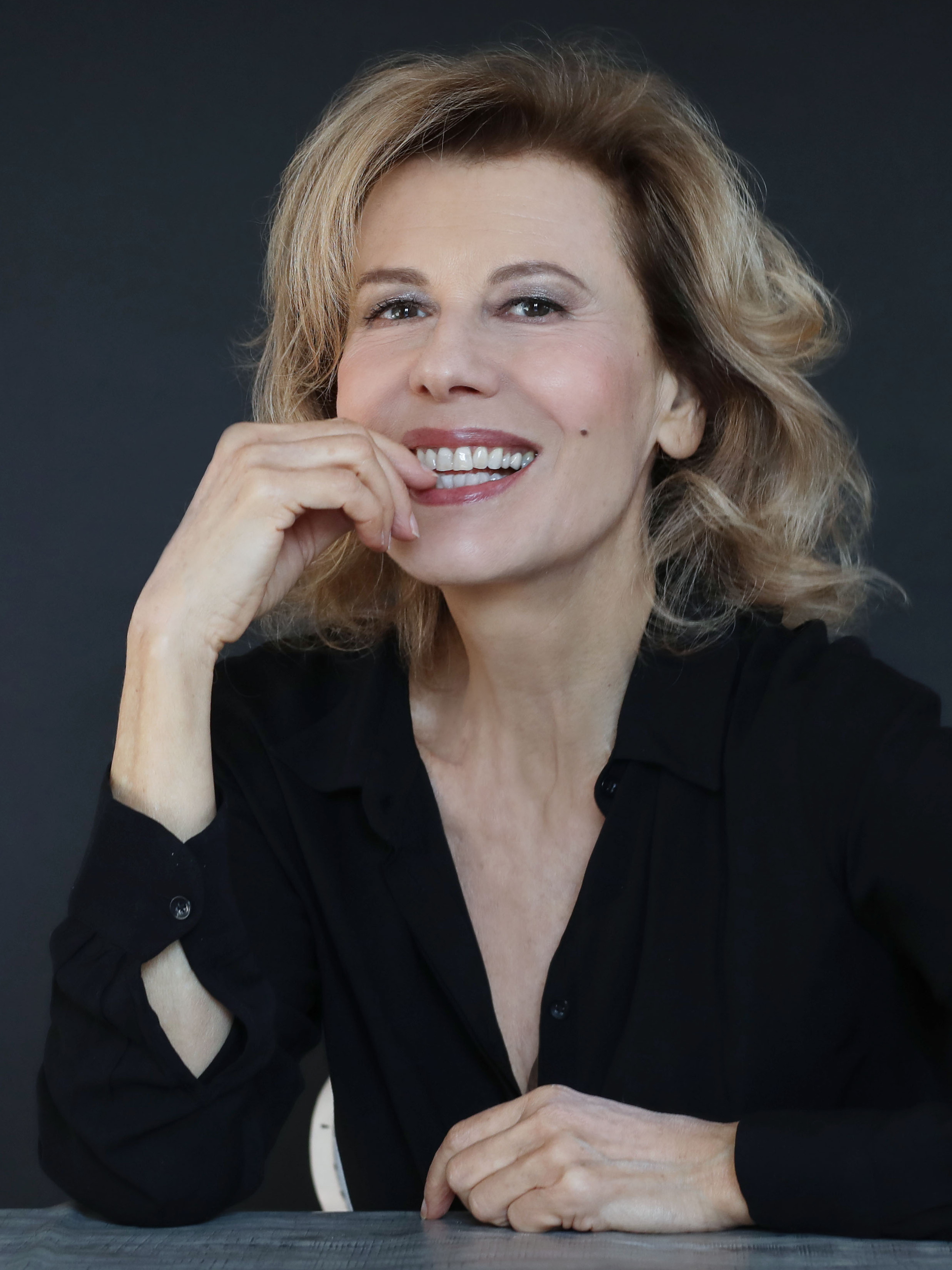
- Daniela Poggi in 2020
- Born: 17 October 1954 (age 72); Savona, Italy
- Other name: Daniela Levy
- Occupation: Actress
- Years active: 1975–present

Daniela Poggi (born 17 October 1954) is an Italian film and stage actress and television presenter.

== Biography ==
Born in Savona, Italy, at young age Poggi studied ballet, then graduated from Linguistic High-school. Following her family she moved in Milan where she started working in commercials; resumed her ballet studies, after a few minor film roles Poggi had the first great opportunity in 1978, chosen by Walter Chiari to star with him in the revue Hai mai provato nell'acqua calda?. In 1979 she got a huge popularity thanks to the participation to the Rai 1 variety television La sberla, that was seen by an average of about 20 million viewers.

Poggi started her cinema career in genre films, especially starring in roles of sexual object in several commedie sexy all'italiana, then, from late 1980s, she switched into more dramatic roles. She was named a UNICEF Goodwill Ambassador in 2001.

She considers herself Roman Catholic.

== Filmography ==
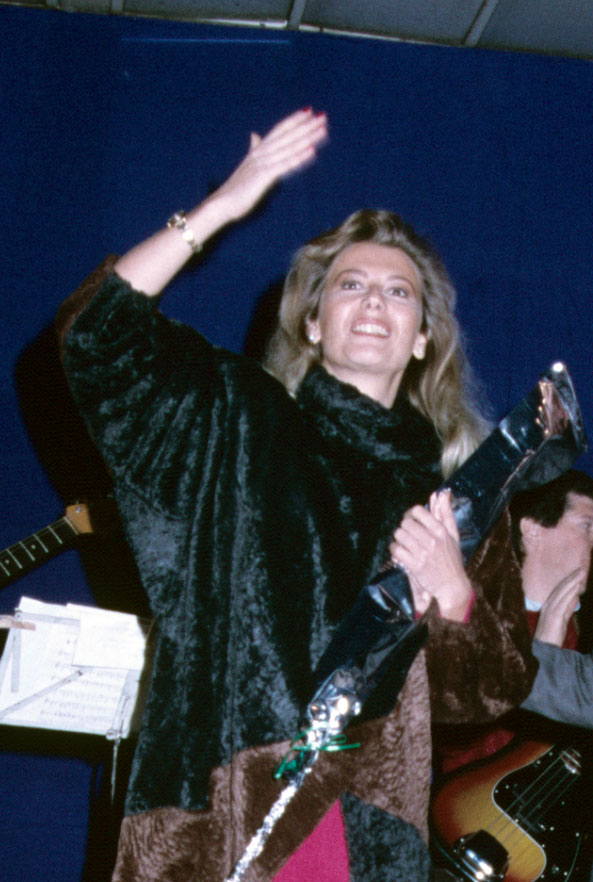
Poggi in 1986

=== Film ===
- Son tornate a fiorire le rose, directed by Vittorio Sindoni (1975)
- Gestapo's Last Orgy, directed by Cesare Canevari (1977)
- C'era una volta la legge, directed by Stelvio Massi (1979)
- Belli e brutti ridono tutti, directed by Domenico Paolella (1979)
- Tre sotto il lenzuolo, directed by Domenico Paolella and Michele Massimo Tarantini (1979)
- Quando la coppia scoppia, directed by Steno (1980)
- Prestami tua moglie, directed by Giuliano Carnimeo (1980)
- I'm Getting a Yacht, directed by Sergio Corbucci (1980)
- Speed Cross, directed by Stelvio Massi (1980)
- La gatta da pelare, directed by Pippo Franco (1981)
- Teste di quoio, directed by Giorgio Capitani (1981)
- L'ultimo harem, directed by Sergio Garrone (1981)
- Culo e camicia, directed by Pasquale Festa Campanile (1981)
- I camionisti, directed by Flavio Mogherini (1982)
- Il paramedico, directed by Sergio Nasca (1982)
- Il tifoso, l'arbitro e il calciatore, directed by Pier Francesco Pingitore (1983)
- Quelli del casco, directed by Luciano Salce (1987)
- Giallo alla regola, directed by Stefano Roncoroni (1988)
- Supysaua, directed by Enrico Coletti (1988)
- Dr. M, directed by Claude Chabrol (1990)
- Al calar della sera, directed by Alessandro Lucidi (1992)
- Cain vs. Cain, directed by Alessandro Benvenuti (1993)
- La strana storia di Olga O., directed by Antonio Bonifacio (1995)
- Viola Kisses Everybody, directed by Giovanni Veronesi (1998)
- The Dinner, directed by Ettore Scola (1998)
- Notte prima degli esami, directed by Fausto Brizzi (2006)
- The Past Is a Foreign Land, directed by Daniele Vicari (2008)
- L'ultima estate, directed by Eleonora Giorgi (2009)
- Infernet, directed by Giuseppe Ferlito (2016)

=== Television ===
- La sberla, directed by Giancarlo Nicotra (1978–1979)
- L'occhio di Giuda, directed by Paolo Poeti (1982)
- Un caso d'incoscienza, directed by Emidio Greco (1984)
- La ragazza dell'addio, directed by Daniele D'Anza (1984)
- I ragazzi di celluloide 2, directed by Sergio Sollima (1984)
- Voglia di volare, directed by Pier Giuseppe Murgia (1984)
- Il commissario Corso, directed by Gianni Lepre and Alberto Sironi (1987)
- Sonore, directed by Biagio Proietti (1988)
- I figli del vento, directed by Enzo Doria (1989)
- Solo, directed by Sandro Bolchi (1989)
- Vita dei castelli, directed by Vittorio De Sisti (1990)
- Il commissario Corso – episode Patto con la morte, directed by Gianni Lepre (1991)
- Ti ho adottato per simpatia, directed by Paolo Fondato (1991)
- La ragnatela, directed by Alessandro Cane (1991)
- A Season of Giants, directed by Jerry London (1991)
- La moglie nella cornice, directed by Philippe Monnier (1991)
- La cavalière, directed by Philippe Monnier (1992)
- Il coraggio di Anna, directed by Giorgio Capitani (1992)
- Morte a contratto, directed by Giorgio Lepre (1993)
- La ragnatela 2, directed by Alessandro Cane (1993)
- Amico mio – episode Per troppo amore, directed by Paolo Poeti (1993)
- Butterfly, directed by Tonino Cervi (1995)
- Belle Époque, directed by Gavin Millar (1995)
- Incantesimo 2, directed by Alessandro Cane and Tomaso Sherman (1998)
- Sotto il cielo dell'Africa, directed by Ruggero Deodato (1998)
- Una donna per amico, directed by Rossella Izzo (1998)
- Un prete tra noi 2 – episode Per troppo amore, directed by Giorgio Capitani (1999)
- Paul the Apostle, directed by Roger Young (2000)
- Vento di ponente, (2002)
- Incantesimo 5, directed by Alessandro Cane and Leandro Castellani (2002)
- Incantesimo 7, directed by Alessandro Cane (2004)
- Le cinque giornate di Milano, directed by Carlo Lizzani (2004)
- Incantesimo 8, directed by Ruggero Deodato and Tomaso Sherman (2005)
- Il maresciallo Rocca 5 – episode Il mistero di Santa Brigida (2005)
- Capri, directed by Enrico Oldoini (2006)
- Nebbie e delitti 2 – episode Vietato ai minori, directed by Riccardo Donna (2007)
- Capri 2, directed by Andrea Barzini and Giorgio Molteni (2008)
- Io e mio figlio - Nuove storie per il commissario Vivaldi, directed by Luciano Odorisio (2010)

== Discography ==
- Donna speciale (1988)

== Prize and awards ==
- 24 October 2020: the 9th edition of the John Paul II Prize in Bisceglie, Italy, together with the Roman Catholic Apostolic Nuncio Francisco-Javier Lozano Sebastián, Simona Amabene, the Italian founder of the Marian family prayer group Costola Rosa, the singers Golec uOrkiestra, Paolo Mengoli, Manuela Villa, Igor Minerva, Daniele Si Nasce, Devis Manoni, Silva Perentin, and the actors Valentina Persia, Luca Capuano, and Vincenzo Bocciarelli.
