= Giorgio Stegani =

Italian filmmaker (1928–2020)

- Born: 13 October 1928; Milan, Italy
- Died: 20 February 2020 (aged 91); Rome, Italy
- Years active: 1954 - 1990

Giorgio Stegani (13 October 1928 – 20 February 2020) was an Italian film and television writer, film director and second unit director.

Stegani was best known for his western films of the 1960s. He wrote the script for westerns such as Blood for a Silver Dollar (1965), directed and wrote Adiós gringo in 1965 and co-wrote Blood at Sundown (1966).

== Selected filmography ==
- Adiós gringo (1965)
- Golden Chameleon (1967)
- Gentleman Killer (1967)
- Beyond the Law (1968)
- Summer Affair (1971)
- The Last Desperate Hours (1974)
- Ready for Anything (1977)

== External links and sources ==
- Giorgio Stegani at IMDb
