= SS Girls =

- Italian film poster for SS Girls
- Directed by: Bruno Mattei
- Screenplay by: Bruno Mattei; Giacinto Boncquista
- Produced by: Oscar Santaniello
- Starring: Gabriele Carrara; Marina D'Aunia; Macha Magall; Luciano Pigozzi; Tamara Triffez
- Cinematography: Emilio Giannini
- Edited by: Vincenzo Vanni
- Music by: Gianni Marchetti
- Production company: Distribuzione Associate Regionali
- Distributed by: Indipendenti Regionali
- Release date: 1977
- Country: Italy
- Language: Italian

SS Girls (Italian: Casa privata per le SS, lit. 'Private House for the S.S.') is a 1977 Italian Nazisploitation film by director Bruno Mattei. The film is about a brothel where traitors of the Nazi high command are eradicated. To help the brothel out, a Nazi commander, involved in intelligence work, enlists the aid of scientists who train various prostitutes to sexually satisfy the desires of the Nazi Forces high command and root out any traitors in the Nazi military Forces or the Nazi SS Forces.

== Synopsis ==
Near the end of World War II a German officer selects ten prostitutes to root out the traitors in Hitler's Third Reich. After many orgies and the execution of disloyal officers, the entire company kill themselves upon hearing of Hitler's death on April 30, 1945 after the Soviet forces stormed into Berlin and crushed the remaining Nazi Forces.

== Partial cast ==
- Ivano Staccioli as Oberstgruppenführer und General Berger
- Luciano Pigozzi as Prof. Jürgen (as Alan Collins)
- Gabriele Carrara as Standartenfuhrer und Oberst Hans Schellenberg
- Marina Daunia as Frau Inge
- Macha Magall as Madame Eva
- Lucic Bogoliub Benny as Oberfuhrer und Oberst/Brigadier Dirlewanger
- Eolo Capritti as Nazi General (as Al Capri)

== Style ==
SS Girls is an example of Naziploitation. This cycle of Nazi sexploitation films are predominantly Italian in origin and emerged for a brief period between 1975 and 1977. In Bruno Mattei's Nazi-themed films, the settings are Nazi bordellos and are concerned with staging explicit sexuality.

== Production ==
Parts of the score of SS Girls was from Gianni Marchetti's score for The Last Desperate Hours.

== Release ==
SS Girls passed Italian censorship on January 12, 1977.
