= Nazi Love Camp 27 =

The Swastika on the Belly
- Italian promotional poster
- Directed by: Mario Caiano
- Written by: Mario Caiano; Gianfranco Clerici
- Produced by: Armando Amati
- Starring: Sirpa Lane; Giancarlo Sisti
- Music by: Francesco De Masi
- Distributed by: Fida International Films
- Release date: 1977
- Running time: 85 minutes
- Country: Italy
- Language: Italian

Nazi Love Camp 27 (Italian: La svastica nel ventre) or The Swastika on the Belly is a 1977 Italian Nazi exploitation film by Italian director Mario Caiano and starring Finnish actress Sirpa Lane. In between brutal depictions of a brothel in a concentration camp and a high-class brothel for leading Nazis, the film partially focuses upon the Lebensborn program and, albeit being generally categorized among erotic films, it is one of the few Nazisploitation films to contain scenes that have been considered hardcore pornography.

== Plot ==
The film opens with young Jewish girl Hanna and her German boyfriend making love in a field in the days before the outbreak of World War II. Upon the outbreak of war, Hanna and her family are rounded up, but not before her mother is killed trying to defend the family. They are taken to a concentration camp, where Hanna's surviving family is gassed upon arrival.

At night, whilst resting in the camp barracks Hanna and a female companion are gang raped by SS soldiers, leading Hanna's friend to throw herself onto an electrified barbed wire fence out of despair. Now alone, Hanna is forced to work in the "love camp" section of the camp, servicing SS soldiers. The commandant soon sets his sights on Hanna and she becomes his personal lover and they engage in mutual cross-dressing and bondage.

Following he offers Hanna an Aryan identity and she is placed in charge of a brothel for Nazi officers. Meanwhile, her boyfriend who works at a Lebensborn program, tries to search out Hanna, thinking her dead. When they meet, Hanna refuses to be rescued and instead returns to run a party for visiting SS Generals at the brothel. Here, after singing a Yiddish song to the surprise of the guests, she takes revenge, shooting the Commandant and a visiting General, before being gunned down.

== Cast ==
- Sirpa Lane as Hannah Meyer
- Giancarlo Sisti as Captain Kurt Von Stein
- Roberto Posse as Captain Klaus Berger
- Gianfilippo Carcano as Hanna's Father
- Piero Lulli as General at the Nazi Brothel
- Marzia Ubaldi as Frau Gruber
- Renata Moar as Klaus's Sister
- Isabella Russo
- Christiana Borghi as Woman at the Love Camp (credited as Cristiana Borghi)
- Mike Morris as Herr Gruppenführer

== Production ==
The film's exterior scenes were shot in Toblach (Dobbiaco, in Italian), in the Alto Adige region.
