= Gestapo's Last Orgy =

- Directed by: Cesare Canevari
- Screenplay by: Antonio Lucarella; Cesare Canevari
- Story by: Antonio Lucarella
- Starring: Marc Loud; Daniela Poggi; Maristella Greco
- Cinematography: Claudio Catozzo
- Edited by: Enzo Monachesi
- Music by: Alberto Baldan Bembo
- Production company: Cine Lu.Ce.
- Distributed by: Indipendenti Regionali
- Release date: 1977
- Country: Italy
- Language: Italian

Gestapo's Last Orgy (Italian: 'L'ultima orgia del III Reich, lit. 'Last Orgy of the Third Reich') is a 1977 Italian Nazi exploitation film directed and co-written by Cesare Canevari and starring Daniela Poggi.

== Plot ==
Conrad von Starke is driving down a road, listening to a war crimes trial on the radio. He stops the car and exits at the ruins of an old death camp. There, he meets Lise Cohen. It is revealed that Lise is a former prisoner of the camp and that the man, Conrad, is the former Commandant who has arranged to meet her several years after the end of World War II. He thanks her for the testimony that she provided at his war crimes trial, which saved him from certain death and helped him integrate into the new West Germany. After touring the camp's ruins, Lise and von Starke make love.

Lise has a flashback to her time at the camp during the war. A shipment of female prisoners arrives. Some are immediately sent to the gas chamber, and some are burned alive. In a hall, other women are stripped naked before naked members of the SS-Totenkopfverbände, aroused after watching a porn film which includes photos of rape, mother-daughter incest, bondage, coprophilia, urination, and extreme sex. The female inmates are then raped, tortured, sodomized with bats, and sexually humiliated in an orgy while Commandant Starke and a visiting SS General watch.

Later, a woman has sex with an SS guard, who is himself shot when he speaks out against her rape by other guards. A menstruating inmate is ordered to be thrown to the dogs by Alma, a female SS guard and the commandant's lover. More sex scenes between guards and inmates take place. Meanwhile, Starke and his SS staff debate Nazi theories at the dinner table, and an SS Guard tells them of his hopes that there will one day be farms so the Jews can be eaten as a food source. The staff become aroused by this and practice both cannibalism and infanticide, eating a stew made of unborn Jewish infants. When one of the female prisoners passes out in shock, they douse her body in brandy and set it alight before eating her corpse as well.

Starke becomes interested in Lise and finds himself obsessed with her unbreakable spirit. Since whatever he does to torture her does not demoralize her, Starke grows angry and drops her only friend at the camp into a pit of quicklime as Lise, stripped nude and hanging from her wrists, is forced to watch. The Commandant threatens to drop Lise into the pit as well. Unfazed by this, Lise is whipped, has her head lowered into a box filled with rats, and is raped, but still, she does not cry out. She goes to the hospital and is treated by a pacifistic young Doctor, revealing to him why she does not cry. She wants to die, as she betrayed her family to the Nazis years earlier and feels intense guilt about it. When the Doctor tells her it was not her fault, she becomes determined to survive. She has sex with the Doctor, reaffirming her decision to live.

Lise is tortured further by Starke, who tells her he has fallen in love with her. She claims to love him as well and begins an extreme sexual relationship with him, willingly donning a gruesome belt made of the scalps of fellow inmates to prove her affection. The Commandant is later sodomized with his whip by jealous Alma, who realizes the extent of Starke's feelings for Lise. In response, he fatally strangles Alma. Lise gives birth to a child, but Starke kills the baby because it is "half-Jewish," and a "half-breed" would have no place in the world. Back in the present day, Lise and Starke still stand in the ruined camp and are having sex. Lise shoots him, and his body falls into a nearby pit.

=== Alternative Italian ending ===
In an alternate ending of the film, Lise shoots Starke and then herself.

== Cast ==
- Adriano Micantoni as Conrad Von Starke (credited as Marc Loud)
- Daniela Poggi as Lise Cohen (credited as Daniela Levy)
- Maristella Greco as Alma
- Fulvio Ricciardi as Prison Doctor
- Antiniska Nemour as Lager Prisoner
- Caterina Barbero
- Domenico Seren Gay (credited as Domenico Serengal)
- Vittorio Joderi as Lieutenant Weissmann
- Pietro Bosco
- Pietro Vial
- Renato Paracchi as Professor
- Maria Grazia Cisera
- Tino Polenghi as SS Soldier (credited as Santino Polenghi)
- Achille Grioni as Nazi Officer (uncredited)

== Style ==
Gestapo's Last Orgy was part of a sub-genre of exploitation films created in the early 1970s called Naziploitation. These films were primarily produced in Italy and in the United States.

== Production ==
Daniela Poggi said she regrets having participated in this movie: "I was twenty years old then and I was a model, my agency pushed me. Unfortunately they added unexpected scenes and a monstrous title."

== Release ==
Gestapo's Last Orgy passed Italian censors on January 28, 1977. It has been released under several English titles on home video including Gestapo's Last Orgy and Caligula Reincarnated as Hitler. It was refused a UK DVD certificate by the BBFC in January 2021 due to pervasive sexual and sadistic violence in a clearly anti-Semitic context.

== Reception ==
From retrospective reviews, Robert Firsching of AllMovie declared that among the Nazi-themed Italian sex and horror oriented films made after the release of The Night Porter, Gestapo's Last Orgy was "among the best made and absorbing of its ilk."
