= Oliver Reed filmography =

Performances by English actor

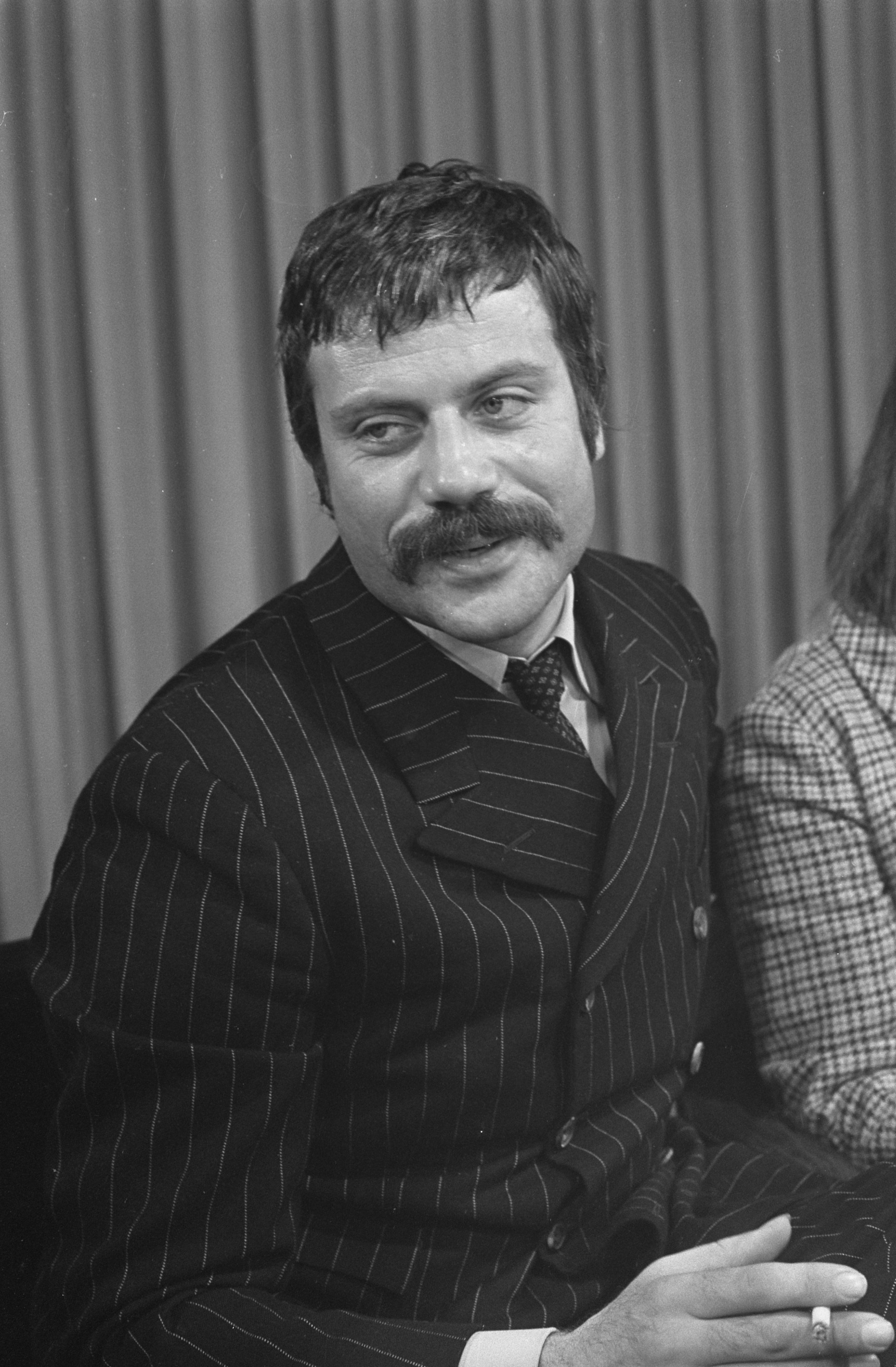
Oliver Reed in 1968

This article presents the filmography of English actor Oliver Reed.

== Film ==
=== 1950s ===
Year	Title	Role	Director	Notes
1955	Value for Money	Extra	Ken Annakin	Uncredited
1959	The Square Peg	Ed	John Paddy Carstairs	Uncredited
1959	The Captain's Table	Alec	Jack Lee	Uncredited
1959	Upstairs and Downstairs	Train Passenger	Ralph Thomas	Uncredited

=== 1960s ===
Year	Title	Role	Director	Notes
1960	Life Is a Circus	Spectator at Sideshow	Val Guest	Uncredited
1960	The Angry Silence	Mick	Guy Green	
1960	The League of Gentlemen	Babes in the Woods Chorus Boy	Basil Dearden	Uncredited
1960	The Two Faces of Dr. Jekyll	Thug	Terence Fisher	Uncredited
1960	Beat Girl	Plaid Shirt	Edmond T. Gréville	
1960	The Bulldog Breed	Teddy Boy in Cinema Fight	Robert Asher	Uncredited
1960	Sword of Sherwood Forest	Lord Melton	Terence Fisher	Uncredited
1960	Hello London	Himself	Sidney Smith	
1961	His and Hers	Ewan	Brian Desmond Hurst	
1961	No Love for Johnnie	Man with Bucket on His Head	Ralph Thomas	Uncredited
1961	The Rebel	Artist in Cafe	Robert Day	
1961	The Curse of the Werewolf	Leon Corledo	Terence Fisher	First leading role
1962	The Pirates of Blood River	Brocaire	John Gilling	
1962	Captain Clegg	Harry Cobtree	Peter Graham Scott	
1963	The Damned	King	Joseph Losey	
1963	Paranoiac	Simon Ashby	Freddie Francis	
1963	The Scarlet Blade	Capt. Tom Sylvester	John Gilling	
1964	The System	Tinker	Michael Winner	
1965	The Party's Over	Moise	Guy Hamilton	
1965	The Brigand of Kandahar	Ali Khan	John Gilling	
1966	The Trap	La Bete	Sidney Hayers	
1967	The Jokers	David Tremayne	Michael Winner	
1967	The Shuttered Room	Ethan Whately	David Greene	
1967	I'll Never Forget What's'isname	Andrew Quint	Michael Winner	
1968	Oliver!	Bill Sikes	Carol Reed	
1969	The Assassination Bureau	Ivan Dragomiroff	Basil Dearden	
1969	Hannibal Brooks	Lance Cpl. Stephen "Hannibal" Brooks	Michael Winner	
1969	Women in Love	Gerald Crich	Ken Russell	

=== 1970s ===
Year	Title	Role	Director	Notes
1970	The Lady in the Car with Glasses and a Gun	Michael Caldwell	Anatole Litvak	
1970	Take a Girl Like You	Patrick Standish	Jonathan Miller	
1971	The Hunting Party	Frank Calder	Don Medford	
1971	The Devils	Urbain Grandier	Ken Russell	
1972	Z.P.G.	Russ McNeil	Michael Campus	
1972	Sitting Target	Harry Lomart	Douglas Hickox	
1972	The Triple Echo	The Sergeant	Michael Apted	
1973	Dirty Weekend	Fabrizo Balboa	Dino Risi	First non-British film
1973	One Russian Summer	Igor Palizyn	Antonio Calenda	
1973	Revolver	Vito Cipriani	Sergio Sollima	
1973	The Three Musketeers	Athos	Richard Lester	
1974	Mahler	Train Conductor	Ken Russell	Cameo appearance
1974	Blue Blood	Tom	Andrew Sinclair	
1974	The Four Musketeers	Athos	Richard Lester	
1974	And Then There Were None	Hugh Lombard	Peter Collinson	
1975	Tommy	"Uncle" Frank Hobbs	Ken Russell	
1975	The New Spartans	Col. Lancelot	Jack Starrett	Unfinished
1975	Royal Flash	Otto von Bismarck	Richard Lester	
1975	Lisztomania	Princess Carolyn's Servant	Ken Russell	Cameo appearance
1976	Burnt Offerings	Ben Rolf	Dan Curtis	
1976	The Sell Out	Gabriel Lee	Peter Collinson	
1976	The Great Scout & Cathouse Thursday	Joe Knox	Don Taylor	
1977	The Ransom	Nick McCormick	Richard Compton	
1977	The Prince and the Pauper	Sir Miles Hendon	Richard Fleischer	
1978	Tomorrow Never Comes	Jim Wilson	Peter Collinson	
1978	The Big Sleep	Eddie Mars	Michael Winner	
1978	The Mad Trapper	Albert Johnson	Harvey Hart	Unfinished
1978	The Class of Miss MacMichael	Terence Sutton	Silvio Narizzano	
1979	The Brood	Dr. Hal Raglan	David Cronenberg	
1979	A Touch of the Sun	Capt. Daniel Nelson	Peter Curran	

=== 1980s ===
Year	Title	Role	Director	Notes
1980	Dr. Heckyl and Mr. Hype	Dr. Henry Heckyl / Mr. Edward Hype	Charles B. Griffith	Fantafestival Jury Award for Best Actor
1981	Lion of the Desert	Gen. Rodolfo Graziani	Moustapha Akkad	
1981	Condorman	Sergei Krokov	Charles Jarrott	
1981	Venom	Dave Averconnelly	Piers Haggard	
1983	The Sting II	Doyle Lonnegan	Jeremy Kagan	
1983	Fanny Hill	Edward Widdlecome	Gerry O'Hara	
1983	Clash of Loyalties	Col. Gerard Leachman	Mohamed Shukri Jameel	
1983	Spasms	Jason Kincaid	William Fruet	
1983	Two of a Kind	Beasley	John Herzfeld	
1986	Captive	Gregory Le Vay	Paul Mayersberg	
1986	Castaway	Gerald Kingsland	Nicolas Roeg	
1987	Gor	Sarm	Fritz Kiersch	
1987	The Misfit Brigade	General von Grathwohl	Gordon Hessler	
	Dragonard	Capt. Shanks	Gerard Kikoine	
1988	Skeleton Coast	Capt. David Simpson	John Cardos	
1988	Blind Justice	Ian Ballinger	Terence Ryan	
1988	Captive Rage	Gen. Belmondo	Cedric Sundstrom	
1988	Rage to Kill	Major Gen. Edward Turner	David Winters	
1988	The Adventures of Baron Munchausen	Vulcan	Terry Gilliam	
1989	The Revenger	Jack Fisher	Cedric Sundstrom	
1989	The House of Usher	Roderick Usher	Alan Birkinshaw	
1989	The Return of the Musketeers	Athos	Richard Lester	

=== 1990s ===
Year	Title	Role	Director	Notes
1990	Hired to Kill	Michael Bartos	Nico Mastorakis; Peter Rader	
1990	Panama Sugar	The General	Marcello Avallone	
1991	The Pit and the Pendulum	The Cardinal	Stuart Gordon	
1992	Severed Ties	Dr. Hans Vaughn	Damon Santostefano	
1995	Russian Roulette: Moscow 95	Prince	Menahem Golan	
1995	Funny Bones	Dolly Hopkins	Peter Chelsom	
1996	Luise and the Jackpot	Matthias	Menahem Golan	
1996	The Bruce	Bishop Wisharton	Bob Carruthers; David McWhinnie	
1998	The Incredible Adventures of Marco Polo	Capt. Cornelius Donovan	George Erschbamer	
1999	Parting Shots	Jamie Campbell-Stewart	Michael Winner	Posthumous release

=== 2000s ===
Year	Title	Role	Director	Notes
2000	Orpheus & Eurydice	Narrator (voice)	Paul Pissanos	Posthumous release
2000	Gladiator	Antonius Proximo	Ridley Scott	Posthumous release Nominated - BAFTA Award for Best Actor in a Supporting Role; Nominated - Screen Actors Guild Award for Outstanding Performance by a Cast in a Motion Picture

== Television ==
Year	Title	Role	Notes
1958, 1959	The Invisible Man	Cafe Patron / Man at Roulette Table	2 episodes
1959	The Four Just Men	Student	Episode: "Panic Button"
1959	The Golden Spur	Richard of Gloucester	Main cast; Series 1
1959, 1964	The Third Man	Theodore / Pepi	2 episodes
1962	ITV Play of the Week	David / Dan	2 episodes
1963, 1964	The Saint	Joe Catelli / Aristides Koralis	2 episodes
1965	Monitor	Narrator	2 episodes
1965	The Debussy Film	Claude Debussy	Television film
1965	R3	Dr. Richard Franklin	Main cast; Series 2
1965	It's Dark Outside	Sebastian	Episode: "The Prevalence of Liars"
1966	Court Martial	Alex	Episode: "La Belle France"
1967	Omnibus	Dante Gabriel Rossetti	Episode: "Dante's Inferno"
1983	Masquerade	Peter "Wolfen" Sergove	Television film
1985	Black Arrow	Sir Daniel	Television film
1985	Christopher Columbus	Martín Alonso Pinzón	Miniseries; 4 episodes
1987	The Misfit Brigade	Gen. von Grathwohl	Television film
1989	The Lady and the Highwayman	Sir Philip Gage	Television film
1990	Treasure Island	Billy Bones	Television film Nominated- CableACE Award for Best Supporting Actor in a Movie or Miniseries
1990	A Ghost in Monte Carlo	The Rajah	Television film
1991	Prisoner of Honor	Gen. Raoul de Boisdeffre	Television film
1993	Return to Lonesome Dove	Gregor Dunnigan	Miniseries; 4 episodes
1996	Superbrain	Professor Norbert Marcus	Television film
1998	Jeremiah	General Safan	Television film

== Awards and nominations ==
Year	Award	Category	Work	Result	Ref
1983	Fantafestival	Best Actor	Dr. Heckyl and Mr. Hype	Won	
1991	CableACE Award	Best Supporting Actor in a Movie or Miniseries	Treasure Island	Nominated	
2001	7th Screen Actors Guild Awards	Outstanding Performance by a Cast in a Motion Picture (shared)	Gladiator	Nominated	
2001	54th British Academy Film Awards	BAFTA Award for Best Actor in a Supporting Role	Gladiator	Nominated	
