= John Gordon Davis =

- Born: 21 January 1936; Enkeldoorn, Southern Rhodesia
- Died: 5 November 2014 (aged 78)
- Occupation: Author
- Spouse(s): Patzi (1st), Rosemary (2nd)
- Writing career
- Language: English
- Genre: Adventure fiction
- Notable work: Hold My Hand I'm Dying (1967)

John Gordon Davis (21 January 1936 – 5 November 2014) was a Southern Rhodesian writer of adventure novels. The worldwide success of his first published novel, Hold My Hand I'm Dying (1967), prompted him to become a full-time writer.

== Education and early occupations ==
Of Welsh heritage, Gordon Davis was born in the town of Enkeldoorn in Southern Rhodesia (now Chivhu, Zimbabwe), to John Gordon-Davis and Iris Tilly. His father, the local bank manager, had grown up in Colesberg, South Africa, where his own father was at one time mayor. John Junior went to school at Bishops in Cape Town, matriculated at Umtata High School in the Transkei and completed a BA (Political Science) at Rhodes University in Grahamstown. While a student, he joined the Seaman's Union. He paid his tuition fees by working as a deckhand in the British Merchant Navy for two years, sailing around much of the world, and by joining the Dutch whaling fleet in the Antarctic. His experiences at sea later served as inspiration for his whaling novels Cape of Storms (1970) and Leviathan (1976).

Gordon Davis travelled widely as a graduate, at times accompanied by his then girlfriend Patti Dougherty. He travelled around the Americas, worked for a spell at a gold mine in Northern Canada, practised law in Toronto and hitch-hiked and drove around the United States. He also worked as a steward on the Union-Castle Line and the Cunard Line, and hitch-hiked through the Australian Outback. Whilst working as a clerk for the chief justice back in Rhodesia and going on circuit with him, Gordon Davis obtained a bachelor's degree in Law from the University of South Africa. He was called to the bar, working as assistant public prosecutor in the Magistrate's Courts in the years ahead of Rhodesia's Unilateral Declaration of Independence in 1965. He next became Crown Counsel in the Attorney General's Chambers.

In the Rhodesian capital Salisbury, Gordon Davis had a chance encounter with adventure writer Wilbur Smith, whom he knew from their time at Rhodes University. Gordon Davis said he had just come back from Canada, where he had gone looking for adventure without finding it. Smith told him he was living off the royalties of his recent first novel, which had been published in 1964. Gordon Davis, who had believed that no one, especially in Africa, could make a living out of writing, was inspired by Smith's success to try his hand at it. According to Smith in his 2018 memoir On Leopard Rock, Gordon Davis said: "Jesus, if an arsehole like you can publish a book, imagine what I could do." Smith replied: "Well, Gordon Davis, don't tell me about it, go and do it."

== Move to Hong Kong and switch to full-time writing ==
Moving to Hong Kong in 1966, Gordon Davis worked there as Crown Counsel during the political and social upheaval of the Cultural Revolution in nearby China. The city provided him with a setting for the novels The Years of the Hungry Tiger (1974), Typhoon (1978) and The Year of Dangerous Loving (1997), as well as inspiring a non-fiction book of photographs for which he wrote the accompanying text, Hong Kong Through the Looking Glass (1969).

After an initial novel was rejected, his first novel to be published was Hold My Hand I'm Dying (1967). Gordon Davis had written the manuscript in Rhodesia, finishing it in a rented cottage in Inyanga in the Eastern Highlands while on three months' unpaid leave. Published by Michael Joseph Ltd. in the United Kingdom, the book became an instant bestseller, selling millions of copies around the world. The story places fictional characters against the historical backdrop of Rhodesia from the completion of Kariba Dam in 1959 until the outbreak of the Rhodesian Bush War in 1964. The protagonist, Joseph Mahoney, is a Rhodesian-born, British-descended Native Commissioner who is studying law while working on a novel and having an off-and-on relationship with a young Afrikaans woman, Suzie de Villiers. Mahoney considers his Ndebele adjutant Samson Ndhlovu to be a good friend, but their bond is straining under the clamour for Black self-government, which threatens to plunge the country into civil war.

Hold My Hand I'm Dying was published in six languages. The South African censor banned the novel citing its sexual content; the ban was eventually lifted in 1983. The novel was later adapted to film as Blind Justice (1988), directed by Terence Ryan and starring Christopher Cazenove as Mahoney. Following the success of his debut novel, Gordon Davis resigned as Crown Counsel and turned to full-time writing. His novels tend to be populated by boisterous, hard-living, larger-than-life characters with a taste for adventure and a penchant for hedonism. Typically cut from such cloth, the protagonist is faced with a social wrong and becomes involved in attempts to right it. Often, the protagonist also has an intellectual, melancholy side, a cynical view of society and an affinity with the underdog. Several novels address a specific social or ethical issue, such as whaling in Cape of Storms (1970) and Leviathan (1976), the plight of zoo and circus animals in Fear No Evil (1982), or the extreme right in The Land God Made in Anger (1990). On this, Gordon Davis observed: "By instinct, I'm a “cause” writer — whether it's whales, zoos or South Africa — I would like to send a message or enlighten people. But I have to be cautious; most people want to read a yarn. I'm in the entertainment business, and that involves telling a good tale."

== Residence in Spain ==
Gordon Davis met his first wife, Patzi, in Hong Kong; they married in or before 1973. In that year, finding Hong Kong to be too expensive and not wanting to live in war-torn Rhodesia or apartheid South Africa, Gordon Davis moved to Spain with his wife. He bought a finca with a river running through it on the outskirts of Coín, a town near the coast in Andalusia, and had the property restored. He and Patzi separated in 1976, and in 1978 he married Rosemary, who was from Australia. Through the '70s, '80s and '90s he wrote thirteen more published novels. In addition, he wrote the non-fiction account Operation Rhino (1972) about the capture and transport of wild rhinos to a Rhodesian game reserve to protect them from poachers; a rescue operation that Gordon Davis was involved with. He and Rosemary divided their time between Spain and travelling, sailing around most of the world in a succession of yachts. From his home, after retiring from publishing novels, Gordon Davis taught a residential course in fiction writing for aspiring as well as published authors.

Gordon Davis died in November 2014 and was survived by his wife. In 2018, South African publisher the Footprint Press published Hold my Hand: The Life and Times of John Gordon Davis by David Hilton-Barber, with a foreword by Australian novelist Tony Park.

== Reception ==
Hold My Hand I'm Dying was praised by such writers as Marguerite Steen and Stuart Cloete. The latter wrote: 'This is the best novel coming out of Africa that I have read for a number of years. [...] It is seldom that one gets a book of this kind that is both moving emotionally and full of adventure.' The Times described Gordon Davis as being 'in the top echelon of international storytellers'.

His novels did not always impress the critics, with Kirkus Reviews describing Fear no Evil (1982) as '[a]nother loud, ineffectual Message novel' by Gordon Davis.

== Published works ==
- Hold My Hand I'm Dying (1967). ISBN 0-552-11241-0., novel set in Rhodesia in the lead-up to the Bush War; adapted as a 1988 film titled Blind Justice, a.k.a. Hold My Hand I'm Dying
- Hong Kong Through the Looking Glass (1969). ISBN 0-902582-00-3., non-fiction book of colour photographs of Hong Kong by Ted Smart and Pat Fok, with accompanying text by John Gordon Davis
- Cape of Storms (1970). ISBN 0-718107-17-9., novel set on a whaling ship in the Antarctic
- Operation Rhino (1972). ISBN 0-718108-88-4., non-fiction account, set in Rhodesia, of the capture of wild black rhinos and their transport to the Gonarezhou game reserve to protect them from poachers
- The Years of the Hungry Tiger (1974). ISBN 0718111923., novel set in Hong Kong, charting the political tensions between British rule and communism
- Taller Than Trees (1975). ISBN 0718113667., novel about an elephant hunter and his confrontation with a fearsome elephant known as Dhlulamiti
- Leviathan (1976). ISBN 0525144609., novel about a film-maker who sets out to save whales by sabotaging whaling ships
- Typhoon (1978). ISBN 0718116623., novel about the Triads secret criminal society in Hong Kong
- Fear No Evil (1982). ISBN 0025299204., novel set in the United States about a clandestine plot to release circus and zoo animals into the wild
- Seize the Reckless Wind (1984). ISBN 0002228386., novel in which Joseph Mahoney, the protagonist of Hold My Hand I'm Dying, has moved to England and builds a plane with the intention to revolutionise commercial flying
- A Woman Involved (1987). ISBN 0002231581., novel about a worldwide conspiracy that goes to the top of seemingly respectable governments and religious institutions
- The Land God Made in Anger (1990). ISBN 0312051077., novel about a neo-Nazi plot in South West Africa (present-day Namibia)
- Talk to Me Tenderly, Tell Me Lies (1992). ISBN 0002236648., novel about a woman living alone on an isolated farm in the Australian outback
- Roots of Outrage (1994). ISBN 0002236656., novel; a political epic set in apartheid South Africa
- The Year of Dangerous Loving (1997). ISBN 0002236664., novel set in Hong Kong in the last year of British rule
- Unofficial and Deniable (1999). ISBN 0002258048., novel around South Africa's Truth and Reconciliation Commission
