= Carole André =

French actress and masters swimmer (born 1953)

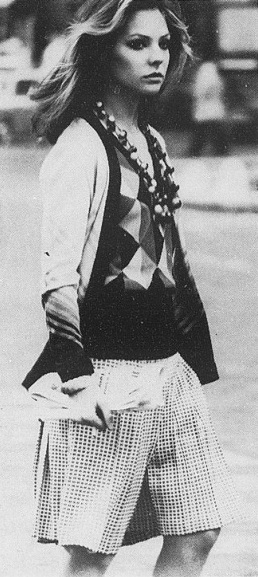
- André in 1973
- Born: 11 March 1953 (age 73); Paris, France
- Other names: Carole André-Smith; Carol André
- Occupations: Actress, marketing executive, garden designer
- Years active: 1967–2007 (acting)
- Known for: Lady Marianna in Sandokan
- Mother: Gaby André

Carole Wendy Smith (born 11 March 1953 (Note: In a February 1976 interview with Stampa Sera, André gave her date of birth as 10 March 1954. She said that she had added a year to her age when she made Face to Face in 1967 and that 1953 had subsequently appeared in her biographical records.)), known professionally as Carole André, is a French actress who appeared in about 40 film and television productions, most of them Italian. She made her film debut in Sergio Sollima's western Face to Face (1967) and became widely known as Lady Marianna in Sollima's RAI adventure series Sandokan (1976). Alongside her early film work, André modelled for fashion magazine'. Her later work included public relations and garden design, and she served as director of international marketing at Cinecittà Studios. In 2023, she set and then improved the masters world record in the women's 70–74 age group for the short-course 50-metre breaststroke.

== Life and career ==
=== Early life and screen debut in westerns (1967) ===
André was the daughter of French actress Gaby André and Eli Smith. She spent part of her childhood in Paris. In a 1980 interview with Il Giornalino, she described her father as an American producer and said, "I'm French, from Paris. But I consider myself Italian, Roman to be precise, partly because I completed my studies in Rome."

In an article published in 2015, she recalled, "My French-American mother played foreign roles in Italian films and she would bring me on set. I was always happy at Cinecittà. It felt like I was in another dimension, where crazy things were normal." Her mother's Italian film credits during those years included Goliath and the Dragon (La vendetta di Ercole, 1960), Natika (1963) and Duel at the Rio Grande (Il segno di Zorro, 1963).

André's film debut came about after she accompanied her parents on a holiday in Italy. In 1967, her mother was invited to Tomas Milian's place and showed him family photographs. Milian, who at the time starred in the Spaghetti Western Face to Face, presented them to the director, Sergio Sollima, who agreed to cast Carole, then 14 years old, in a small part as Cattle Annie, a tomboyish teenager at the outlaws' refuge of Puerto del Fuego who idolises Bennet (Milian) and accepts his brutality without question. As Bennet begins to reconsider his violent way of life, the increasingly ruthless Fletcher (Gian Maria Volonté) tells Annie that her hero does not exist.

The second spaghetti western she appeared in that year was Giuseppe Vari's Death Rides Along, in which André played Susan, a young pioneer who falls in love with a Pony Express rider (Mike Marshall) after her family rescues him following an ambush.

After her film debut, André took a break from acting to finish school.

=== Early film career (1968–1973) ===
In 1968 and 1969, at the age of 15 and 16, André appeared in films by Marco Ferreri, Federico Fellini, Mario Monicelli and Roberto Faenza. Looking back in 1976, André said that starting so young had cost her the carefree years of adolescence and the camaraderie of school. She recalled that at fifteen the youngest people she socialised with were at least twenty-five.

In Marco Ferreri's Dillinger Is Dead, André appeared in the closing scenes as the bikini-clad owner of a yacht bound for Tahiti. Glauco (played by Michel Piccoli) enters her service as her cook.

André also played a boy who kisses another boy in Federico Fellini's Satyricon (1969). She later recalled that Fellini, a friend of her mother's, had preferred to film the scene with a boy and a girl.

In February 1969, still at the age of 15, André acted as Claretta, one of the granddaughters of a wealthy factory owner whose death sets off a struggle over her inheritance in Mario Monicelli’s black comedy Toh, è morta la nonna!. André told Stampa Sera that Monicelli had dropped a planned kiss involving her character.

In Roberto Faenza's science-fiction film H2S, André played Alice, who flees with Tommaso (Denis Gilmore) to a glacier. Their romantic idyll breaks down as Alice grows restless and uses him for sexual gratification. Tommaso ultimately returns to the city, leaving her behind. A reviewer for La Stampa likened their retreat to the story of Robinson Crusoe and attributed its failure to Alice's difficulty adjusting to life outside the authoritarian society they had left. In February 1969, the weekly Cronaca featured André on its cover and reported that she was filming H2S at Cinecittà in what it described as her first demanding role. Shortly after its initial screenings in September 1969, the film was seized on obscenity grounds.

At the age of 16, André played her first leading role in Massimo Franciosa's comedy Togli le gambe dal parabrezza (1969), which had the working title Play Italy. André's character, Sylvie, is a young Parisian student hitchhiking to Rome, who alternately encourages and rebuffs the advances of a married, middle-aged engineer (Alberto Lionello). André's mother, Gaby André, played the engineer's wife. The film was based on Giuseppe Berto's short story "La ragazza va in Calabria", which Berto helped adapt for the screen. A critic reviewing the film for La Stampa interpreted Sylvie's interest in Alberto as stemming from his resemblance to the father she had lost and adored. Stampa Sera attributed Sylvie's acceptance of Alberto's attentions to their fatherly quality and emphasized her refusal to become a prize for him to win.

In a July 1969 interview with Stampa Sera, André said that acting helped her overcome her shyness and gave her new experiences. She wanted to prove to herself that she could act and said she had turned down a part in a Comencini film because it seemed too easy. She did not expect to act indefinitely and intended to continue her studies at university.

Has second leading role the same year was Sara in Franco Brusati's I tulipani di Haarlem, an insecure Englishwoman longing for affection and subjecting her lover Pierre (played by Irish theatre actor Frank Grimes) to increasingly cruel tests. By December 1969, André had finished filming the principal scenes at a villa in Rome. The film ran in competition at the Cannes Film Festival in May 1970. A contemporary review in Corriere della Sera (16 May 1970) called André a promising actress and praised her ease and self-assurance. Enrico Lancia and Fabio Melelli described André's early screen presence as spontaneous, witty and appealingly ingenuous. They praised the assurance of her performance in Tulips of Haarlem and regarded her beauty and "wounded adolescent gaze" as qualities that made her one of the most promising young actresses in Italian cinema of the 1970s. Reviewing the film for La Stampa in September 1970, Leo Pestelli singled out André's performance as Sara, describing her as "a revelation". In an interview André gave in 1974, André considered it her most important film.

The next year, in Jean Valère's Mont-Dragon (released in France in December 1970), André played Marthe de Boismenil, the daughter of an aristocratic widow whose riding master Dormond (Jacques Brel) seeks revenge on the family. Marthe and Dormond develop a rapport through their shared passion for horses, and he introduces her to erotic literature and voyeurism. She ultimately thwarts his plan to marry her by marrying someone her own age. The film was adapted from Robert Margerit's 1944 novel of the same name.

In Violentata sulla sabbia (released April 1971), André was in the lead as Vanina, a young holidaymaker in Sardinia whose approach to intimacy is shaped by the childhood trauma of witnessing her mother’s rape and murder. Vanina's travelling companion Juliette was played by Kiki Caron, the French swimmer who won silver in the 100-metre backstroke at the 1964 Tokyo Olympics. Lancia and Melelli regarded the film, in which André had a clearly defined leading role, as a potential springboard for her career, but described its commercial failure as a major setback.

Alongside her leading roles, André continued to make smaller appearances. She appeared in Luchino Visconti's Death in Venice (1971) as Esmeralda, a prostitute whom Aschenbach (played by Dirk Bogarde) remembers visiting in a Munich brothel. In Duccio Tessari's giallo The Bloodstained Butterfly (1971), André was Françoise Pigaut, the young woman whose murder initiates the investigation. Reviewing the film in 2016, Jennie Kermode says that André "lights up the film in her brief appearances as the first murder victim (and the only one we really get to care about)".

In Mario Camerini's Don Camillo e i giovani d’oggi (1972), André played Caterina, nicknamed “Cat”, the uninhibited young niece of Don Camillo (here played by Gastone Moschin); she is involved with Ringo, the head of the youth gang called Scorpioni. The film was shot in San Secondo Parmense in 1971.

In August 1972, André's mother, the actress Gaby André, died in Italy.

That year, André acted alongside Oliver Reed in both One Russian Summer and Dirty Weekend.

In Antonio Calenda's One Russian Summer, André played Irene, a young woman raised by the landowner Palyzin (Reed) who falls in love with his son Yuri (Ray Lovelock). Vadim (John McEnery), a servant seeking revenge on Palyzin, tells Irene that he is her brother. Irene becomes caught up in Vadim's revenge for his parents' murder by Palyzin, who rapes her before they are both killed by Cossack rebels. Reviewing the film for Stampa Sera, Piero Perona saw echoes of Ophelia's madness in Irene. Speaking to Stampa Sera in February 1973, André described Reed as courteous and cheerful and recalled that he had kept everyone's spirits up during filming in Bulgaria.

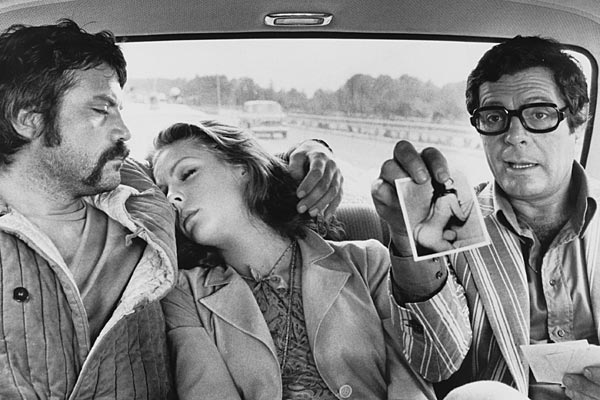
Carole André (centre) with Oliver Reed (left) and Marcello Mastroianni in a scene from Dirty Weekend

In Dino Risi's Dirty Weekend, André played Danda, the student lover of a crooked pharmaceutical executive played by Marcello Mastroianni. The couple's weekend trip ends in their abduction by a gang of anarchists, whose leader is played by Reed. The film was shot in Viareggio in late 1972. André later described Mastroianni as her "protector" during filming, recalling that he had stopped the shoot when he saw that she was frightened during a violent scene with Reed. Lancia and Melelli praised the credibility of André's performance as Danda, who becomes disillusioned with her lover's cowardice during their captivity.

In a 1973 interview with Adele Gallotti, André said she identified more closely with Irene than with Danda, her character in Dirty Weekend. She described Irene as afraid of life and inclined to withdraw into herself, traits she recognized in herself.

In 1973, André appeared in two Italian western productions. André reunited with Tomas Milian, with whom she had acted in her debut, in Alberto De Martino's comic western Ci risiamo, vero Provvidenza?, playing a false countess by the name of Pamela de Ortega whom the bounty hunter Provvidenza (Milian) hopes to marry. She is ultimately revealed to be the wife of the bandit who posed as her father (Luciano Catenacci). In Lucio Fulci's White Fang (based on the homonymous novel by Jack London), André played Krista, a saloon singer in Dawson City, the secret daughter of Father Oatley (Fernando Rey) and the lover of the film's villain (played by John Steiner). After refusing to stay with Smith, Krista is hit by one of his henchmen and accidentally killed.

=== Fashion modelling ===
In a 1976 interview with Stampa Sera, André recalled posing for Vogue and Glamour in the United States at the age of 14. She described modelling as something she had done for fun. For the 15 February 1971 issue of American Vogue, Henry Clarke photographed her wearing Missoni.

=== Breakthrough with Sandokan (1974–1976) ===
André's television breakthrough came in 1976 with the adventure series Sandokan based on novels by Emilio Salgari, which reunited her with Sergio Sollima, the director of her first film. She played the female lead, Marianna Guillonk, known as the "Pearl of Labuan", an aristocrat who leaves her former life behind to join Sandokan (Kabir Bedi), a dispossessed prince who has become a pirate. In a 2003 interview with L'Unità, Sollima said he had insisted on casting André as Marianna because he felt that her French-American background gave her the right "cosmopolitan charm" for the role. In a 2011 interview, André recalled that Sollima had written the role with her in mind. She was initially reluctant to spend six months filming in Asia, as her mother had recently died and her father was living in the United States, but Sollima persuaded her to accept.

Production began in late September 1974.

In his 2021 memoir, Bedi recalled that André's father died during filming. He praised her performance while she was grieving and credited her professionalism with helping make the series a success. The Italian weekly Oggi reported in March 1975 that her father had been killed in November 1974.

Bedi also recalled that André spoke with an American accent and that the mix of languages on set made his work more difficult. Emanuela Fallini voiced Marianna in the Italian version.

In March 1975, almost a year before Sandokan aired, André told Oggi that she could see herself changing careers.

In August 1975, the production company Titanus withheld the completed reels from the RAI in a dispute over rising costs. The RAI broadcast the six episodes from 6 January to 8 February 1976, drawing a large audience. Although filmed and announced in colour, the series initially aired in black and white. Its popularity and the black-and-white broadcast led to a theatrical release in two parts.

André appeared on the cover of the Italian weekly Epoca on 25 February 1976, in a portrait by Marisa Rastellini. The April 1976 issue of the Italian men's magazine Playmen featured André on its cover and in a photo spread. Stampa Sera reported that André had hesitated before accepting the magazine's offer and had declined certain poses.

After Sandokan aired, André answered readers' letters in a column for Stampa Sera titled "Risponde Carole André". In one reply, she wrote that she had read several of Emilio Salgari's books before filming and admired their emphasis on loyalty and honour. She also suggested that Marianna's complete devotion to Sandokan might seem somewhat dated. André later recalled that a journalist had helped her with the column while she was still learning Italian and that many of the letters had come from women. She attributed Marianna's appeal to these readers to the character's desire for freedom and independence as well as her love for Sandokan. Bedi recalled that journalists asked whether the romance had carried over off screen. He understood their curiosity given the importance of the love story and the chemistry between the leads, but said that he and André had never been romantically involved.

Looking back in 2011, André contrasted her sudden fame with her earlier work for Fellini, Visconti, Brusati, Risi and Ferreri. She recalled being regarded as a promising dramatic actress suited to demanding roles, and that those films had brought her little of the attention she received after Sandokan. She described the paparazzi attention as intrusive and said that the experience had changed her life for the worse. To her, it seemed out of proportion to what had happened: "A television serial I had filmed a year and a half earlier had been broadcast — that was all."

André also said that her association with Marianna made it difficult to find other roles. One director, she recalled, turned her down because he thought a close-up of her would prompt audiences to shout "Sandokan! Sandokan!"

On 12 November 2015, André joined Kabir Bedi and other members of the Sandokan cast at the Roma Fiction Fest for a tribute to Sergio Sollima.

=== Further film work and move to the United States (1976–1979) ===
1976 saw five further theatrical releases featuring André, two of them with Christian De Sica: In Duccio Tessari's La madama (January 1976), André played Angela, a journalist who repeatedly helps her boyfriend, the bungling policeman Vito Militello (De Sica), with his investigations. Her role also involved physical comedy, including a scene in which she accidentally strikes Militello in the groin with a billiard cue. In Paolo Nuzzi's Giovannino (May 1976), André played Anna, the mistress of Giovannino (De Sica), whose father has forced him to marry a wealthy heiress. Giovannino wants to leave his wife and run away with Anna, but ultimately lacks the resolve to do so. André joined Christian De Sica and Miguel Bosé at a press conference for Giovannino in February 1976. Covering the event, L'Unità noted that André was then known almost exclusively for playing Marianna in Sandokan.

André's other film work in 1976 included two crime films. In Bruno Paolinelli's Il colpaccio (Big Pot), André played Nicky Stone, a drug dealer who helps a pilot, Michael Teague (Al Cliver), break a convicted diamond thief out of prison. The accomplices pose as paramedics to carry out the escape, and Nicky later takes possession of the diamonds. She hands them over to her father, Mackenzie (William Berger), an insurance agent who organised the scheme while posing as a crime boss. Having fallen in love with Michael, she tips him off about a villa on Lake Como. Film historian Roberto Curti described Il colpaccio as lighter in tone than contemporary poliziotteschi, combining elements of 1960s heist films with a prison escape plot. He wrote that André "looks utterly uninterested" and calls her partner Cliver an "frustratingly inexpressive lead". In Massimo Dallamano's Quelli della calibro 38, André played Sandra, a nightclub owner and girlfriend of gangster Guido (Antonio Marsina). Sandra is approached by Nico (Riccardo Salvino), a member of a special police unit investigating the gang, and is later killed. André said she accepted the role of Sandra to step away briefly from her association with Marianna and to play a contemporary character before returning to Salgari with Honorata in The Black Corsair. She also hoped Sandra's story would warn young women about the dangers of being drawn into criminal circles. On 25 March 1976, Stampa Sera reported that André was in Los Angeles while filming was under way in Turin and was expected to arrive in Turin the following week. Reviewing the film for Stampa Sera, Achille Valdata remarked that audiences were always glad to see André and regretted that her character was killed shortly after the midpoint. Il colpaccio grossed only about 116 million lire and was a financial disappointment, while Quelli della calibro 38 grossed more than 1.2 billion lire.

Released in December 1976, The Black Corsair, again based on novels by Salgari, reunited André with both her Sandokan co-star Kabir Bedi and director Sergio Sollima. She played Honorata, the corsair's love interest and the daughter of the governor against whom he has sworn revenge. In February 1976, André told La Stampa that she had thought carefully before accepting the role of Honorata. She said she would have turned it down had Sandokan been her first acting job and the only work for which she was known, and pointed to the nine years of varied experience she already had. In the same interview, André said she hoped to work in theatre, which she saw as essential to her development as an actress. She valued the continuity of a stage performance and said that the interruptions on a film set required her to find her way back into character repeatedly. In a separate interview published the same day, André said that she had already tried stage acting in the United States and planned to do more on small student stages to test and develop her abilities. In an interview published on 14 March 1976, Sollima said that he was about to travel to the Caribbean to scout locations for the film. In June 1976, Stampa Sera reported that André's contract to play Honorata was still under negotiation and that she had asked for a fee of 50 million lire. During filming off Cartagena, Colombia in July 1976, a storm capsized the two ships being used for a boarding scene, with André and Bedi aboard, interrupting production. On 13 August 1976, La Stampa reported that Sollima and the cast, led by Kabir Bedi and Carole André, were still in Colombia for the production. In an eyewitness account reproduced by Stampa Sera in September 1976, her co-star Tony Renis said he saw André dive into the sea as the galleon began to list. Sollima said that he changed the ending of Salgari's first novel, in which the Corsair leaves Honorata adrift in a lifeboat. He explained that he opted for a happier ending because he feared that the original ending might make Kabir Bedi less popular with audiences. Reviewing the film for Stampa Sera, Achille Valdata described Honorata as the archetypal heroine who serves as the hero's reward.

After 1976, André reduced her acting commitments to spend more time with her partner, producer Paolo Infascelli, and their infant son, Elia Infascelli-Smith. In its 21 May 1977 issue, the Spanish weekly Semana reported that André was expecting a child. André appeared with Elia on the cover of the 31 July 1977 issue of TV Sorrisi e Canzoni, under the headline "La mamma di Labuan" ("The Mother of Labuan"). on 30 July 1977, André also had appeared with Bedi at the Cariddi awards ceremony at the Taormina Film Festival. She moved to the United States to be near relatives and also studied architecture and interior design.

André guest-starred as Claudia in "Duel in Venice", an episode of Return of the Saint which aired in September 1978. Her character, a gondolier, uses her knowledge of Venice to help Simon Templar (Ian Ogilvy) locate a girl kidnapped by an enemy seeking revenge. Ogilvy later named it his favourite episode of the series and praised his co-star, André.

In Tonino Ricci's science-fiction adventure Encounters in the Deep, André played Mary who together with her husband disappears during their honeymoon in the Bermuda Triangle. Production began on 21 August 1978 and filming locations included Dénia, Spain. The film was released on 5 April 1979.

André was also listed in the cast of Superhuman, a proposed superhero film to be directed by Riccardo Freda. It was announced in 1979 and aimed at the South American market but was never realised.

=== Later screen work (1980–2007) ===
In 1980, André returned to Italy and appeared intermittently in a number of TV serials and cinematic films until the early 1990s.

In Luigi Comencini's Eugenio, a drama about a boy caught between his separated parents, André played Milena, his father's new partner. The film passed censorship on 13 February 1980. It was only released in September 1980.

André's television work of that period started with presenting: In September 1980, she introduced afternoon and evening programmes on RAI's Rete 3.

In Rino Di Silvestro's Bello di mamma, André played a psychoanalyst whom Mimì (Tuccio Musumeci) consults as his family questions his virility. Her Sandokan co-star Philippe Leroy played Mimì's father, Duke William. She spent three days filming her scenes in Aci Trezza, Sicily. Recalling their work together during this shoot in a 2017 interview, Musumeci described André as professional, refined and invariably elegant, with a pleasant manner.

In 1981, André played Inspector Mariani in Fernando Di Leo's television crime series L'assassino ha le ore contate. She was one of the three principal cast members, alongside Pier Paolo Capponi as the police commissioner and Edmund Purdom as a forensic specialist. Writing in Nocturno, Davide Pulici noted that the commissioner's initial doubts about Mariani's abilities gave way to a closer relationship, with hints of romance. The six-episode series went unaired. However, the series remains unreleased to this day.

On 11 April 1982, André appeared for a brief interview on Gianni Minà's Rete Due programme Blitz in an episode from Nando Orfei's circus. In its preview, La Stampa announced that she would wear her Marianna costumes from Sandokan again for the occasion. In June 1982, André co-hosted the closing night of the Saint-Vincent Estate music festival with Memo Remigi. A strike by RAI technicians prevented the planned live broadcast on 5 June, and Rete Uno aired the recorded show on 7 June. In July 1982, La Stampa listed André among the guests expected at the Expo 82 trade fair in Aosta on 24 July. The following day, she attended the opening of the swimming pool at Plan Chécrouit in Courmayeur.

In Antonio Margheriti's Yor, the Hunter from the Future (1983), André played Ena, a scientist who with her fellow rebels helps the title character (Reb Brown) overthrow the tyrannical Overlord (John Steiner) and defeat his android army. The cinematic film was edited from a four-part television production, which was broadcast on Rai 1 from 1 to 4 June 1992.

In Yannick Andréi's historical television serial La Chambre des dames, a family saga set among Parisian goldsmiths in the 13th century, André played Kateline la Barbillarde. The series was shot in Cinecittà and on location in Italy, in Saint-Leu d’Esserent and the Rambouillet woods and aired on TF1 from December 1983 to February 1984.

For Fernando Di Leo's Razza violenta (released 24 February 1984 in Italian cinemas), André played Sharon Morris, the lover of CIA agent Mike Martin (Harrison Muller). She secretly follows him to Bangkok, where he discovers that she acts as the intermediary between drug trafficker Polo (Woody Strode) and his Soviet contacts. André's character is killed in the final battle.

In "La fine di Flok", an episode of Giovanni Soldati's I racconti del maresciallo, broadcast on Rai 2 on 4 April 1984, André and Paolo Malco played a married couple who stage the husband's kidnapping to collect an insurance payout. Their scheme unravels after they kill Flok, the dog of the investigating officer. Filming for the episode concluded in Varzo in early February 1983.

In the summer of 1983, André played Frida, a Hungarian refugee, in Daniele D'Anza's television adaptation of Giorgio Scerbanenco's novel La ragazza dell'addio. Frida's reunion with her former lover Martino (Ray Lovelock) prompts him to abandon his plans to marry the wealthy Milla. He marries Frida, who subsequently dies following a terminal illness. The four-part serial aired on Rai 1 from 3 to 24 June 1984. Reviewing the serial for La Stampa, Ugo Bozzolan singled out André's “face of a predestined victim” as an example of how the cast fit the conventions of a photo novel.

In a 1984 interview with Oggi, André said that D'Anza had expected her to speak with a foreign accent. When he heard her deliver her first line on set and told her she did not have one, she improvised an accent for him. She also said that the success of Sandokan in 1976 had gone to her head and led her to make many mistakes. As far as she was concerned, she had yet to make a comeback. She described her recent television parts as "decent roles, nothing more" and said she was still waiting for a leading role in a film or a new television serial.

In Lamberto Bava's 1988 television thriller The Prince of Terror, André played Betty, the wife of a horror-film director (Tomas Arana). The couple is terrorised by a disgruntled former screenwriter (David Brandon). Reviewing Severin Films' 2025 Blu-ray release, Nathaniel Thompson wrote that André "does fine in a mostly one-note part".

In Sandro Bolchi's three-part television serial Solo (1989), André played the aunt of Nico, the ten-year-old protagonist portrayed by Daniele Panichi.

In November 1999, Capital reported that André and the Italian businessman Luigi Abete were in a relationship and living together. La Stampa reported in November 2005 that André and Abete were still together.

In 2007, André appeared as Caterina Morelli in two episodes of the fifth season of Un medico in famiglia, reuniting with her Sandokan co-star Kabir Bedi.

=== Cinecittà, design and swimming ===
André also pursued work outside acting, including design and film-studio marketing.

In 1988, L'Espresso identified André as president of Smith & Wendy, a public relations firm. In 2002, André told La Stampa that she had studied public relations at Harvard Business School and taken summer courses at Stanford University.

By 2002, André was working as director of international marketing at Cinecittà Studios. Together with Elizabeth Daley, dean of the University of Southern California's School of Cinema-Television, she devised a six-week summer workshop at the studios for USC students. André also worked to strengthen ties between the film industries of Rome and Los Angeles. In 2002, she presented Jack Valenti, president of the Motion Picture Association of America, with a figure of the Capitoline Wolf and proposed that Rome give a similar award to foreign producers who had invested in Italian cinema. She sought to attract advertising and fashion shoots to Cinecittà and to expand its international sales network with European partners. In 2003, André was a member of the board of Cinecittà Studios and served on the jury for the OPEN Special Prize at the 60th Venice International Film Festival, which went to Takeshi Kitano for Zatoichi. André kept film memorabilia in her Cinecittà office, including a poster for Death in Venice featuring her portrait and a black bicycle from Tinto Brass's Monella, given to her by longtime studio guard Nando Cacciamani. A 2015 profile described André as being in charge of public relations at Cinecittà. Discussing her public relations work at Cinecittà in 2011, André said: "I would find it very painful to leave the world of cinema. I have been part of it all my life."

As early as December 1976, aprofile in Diez Minutos reported that André made furniture in her spare time, including the bed in her home in Rome. In 2011, a profile reported that she was working in Rome as a manager and garden designer. In her 2002 interview with La Stampa, André joked that her background in garden design had helped her keep Cinecittà's grounds looking their best.

In 2005, La Stampa reported that André oversaw the restoration of buildings at Luiss University in Rome.

In 1969, André said that she had wanted to become a swimming instructor. In 1980, she listed swimming among her hobbies. In 2015, she recalled taking up swimming for physiotherapy at the age of 40 and later entering masters competitions. André took up swimming at the age of 40, initially for physiotherapy, and later began competing in masters events. Competing as Carole Wendy Smith, she set an Italian record in the women's 65–69 age group for the short-course 200-metre freestyle at the Centro Federale di Ostia in 2018, with a time of 2:41.07. On 25 February 2023, she set a masters world record in the women's 70–74 age group for the short-course 50-metre breaststroke, with a time of 42.51 seconds. She improved the record to 42.10 seconds on 22 April that year. A March 2023 profile in Rai News reported that André preferred to be called Smith at Rome's Due Ponti Sporting Club and apparently did not welcome references to her Sandokan fame. At the time, her training routine included four weekly pool sessions, two gym sessions, aqua aerobics and yoga.

== Filmography ==
An x marks a leading role. Release and broadcast dates refer to Italy unless otherwise stated; production years and censorship clearances are labelled separately.

=== Film ===
Year	Title	Director	Leading role	Production and release
1967	Death Rides Along (Con lui cavalca la morte)	Giuseppe Vari		Passed Italian censorship on 20 October 1967. Released on 11 November 1967.
1967	Face to Face (Faccia a faccia)	Sergio Sollima		Released in Italy on 23 November 1967.
1969	Dillinger Is Dead (Dillinger è morto)	Marco Ferreri		Filming completed by summer 1968. Released in January 1969.
1969	H2S	Roberto Faenza		André was reported to be filming at Cinecittà in February 1969. Released in Italy on 5 September 1969.
1969	Fellini Satyricon	Federico Fellini		Released in 1969. André recalled filming her brief appearance at the age of 15.
1969	Oh, Grandmother's Dead (Toh, è morta la nonna!)	Mario Monicelli		André was reported to be filming in Rome in February 1969. Released in Italy on 9 October 1969.
1969	Togli le gambe dal parabrezza	Massimo Franciosa	x	Passed Italian censorship on 15 October 1969. Catalogued as a 1969 film; documented among Rome releases between April and June 1970.
1970	Tulips of Haarlem (I tulipani di Haarlem)	Franco Brusati	x	Principal scenes completed at a villa in Rome by December 1969. Screened in competition at Cannes in May 1970. Released in Italy on 13 August 1970.
1970	Mont-Dragon	Jean Valère	x	Released in France on 16 December 1970.
1971	Death in Venice (Morte a Venezia)	Luchino Visconti		Passed Italian censorship on 27 February 1971.
1971	The Sea Lily (Le Lis de mer / Violentata sulla sabbia)	Jacqueline Audry / Renzo Cerrato	x	Production dated 1970 by Unifrance. Passed Italian censorship on 27 April 1971. Released in Italy on 28 April 1971.
1971	The Bloodstained Butterfly (Una farfalla con le ali insanguinate)	Duccio Tessari		Released in Italy on 10 September 1971.
1972	Don Camillo and the Contestants (Don Camillo e i giovani d'oggi)	Mario Camerini		Filmed in San Secondo Parmense; released on 29 March 1972.
1973	One Russian Summer (Il giorno del furore)	Antonio Calenda	x	Filmed in Bulgaria. Passed Italian censorship on 21 December 1972. World premiere in Saint-Vincent in January 1973.
1973	Dirty Weekend (Mordi e fuggi)	Dino Risi	x	Filming was reported in October 1972. Released on 8 March 1973.
1973	Here We Go Again, Eh Providence? (Ci risiamo, vero Provvidenza?)	Alberto De Martino		Released in Italy on 8 November 1973.
1973	White Fang (Zanna bianca)	Lucio Fulci		Filmed over approximately ten weeks in Bad Mitterndorf and the nearby Tauplitz mountains in Austria. Released in Italy on 21 December 1973.
1976	Sexycop (La madama)	Duccio Tessari		Released in Italy on 16 January 1976.
1976	Giovannino	Paolo Nuzzi		Released in Italy on 4 May 1976.
1976	Sandokan – Part One (Sandokan – Parte prima)	Sergio Sollima	x	First of two theatrical re-edits of the television serial. Listed in Rome cinemas on 15 April 1976 and reviewed at Turin's Cinema Ideal on 16 April.
1976	Big Pot (Il colpaccio)	Bruno Paolinelli	x	Passed Italian censorship on 15 May 1976. Released on 16 June 1976.
1976	Colt 38 Special Squad (Quelli della calibro 38)	Massimo Dallamano		Passed Italian censorship on 24 July 1976.
1976	Sandokan – Part Two (Sandokan – Parte seconda)	Sergio Sollima	x	Second theatrical re-edit of the television serial, released in 1976.
1976	The Black Corsair (Il corsaro nero)	Sergio Sollima	x	Location scouting in the Caribbean was announced in March 1976. Filming off Cartagena, Colombia, was interrupted by a storm in July. Released on 22 December 1976.
1979	Encounters in the Deep (Uragano sulle Bermude)	Tonino Ricci		Production began on 21 August 1978. Locations included Dénia, Spain. Passed Italian censorship on 9 March 1979. Released in Italy on 5 April 1979.
1980	Eugenio (Voltati Eugenio)	Luigi Comencini		Passed Italian censorship on 13 February 1980. Released in September 1980.
1980	Happy Birthday, Harry (Febbre a 40!)	Marius Mattei		Filmdienst dates production to 1976; Il Davinotti lists it as a 1980 film.
1980	Bello di mamma	Rino Di Silvestro		By 13 August 1980, Philippe Leroy had completed his work on the film. He said that the production had given him two months in Sicily. Passed Italian censorship on 23 December 1980.
1983	Yor, the Hunter from the Future (Il mondo di Yor)	Antonio Margheriti		Passed Italian censorship on 23 September 1983. Theatrical version of a four-part television production.
1984	Razza violenta (Razza violenta)	Fernando Di Leo		Passed Italian censorship on 28 January 1984. Released on 24 February 1984.
1991	Génération oxygène	Georges Trillat		Produced in 1988. Released in France on 15 May 1991.

=== Television ===
Year	Title	Director	Leading role	Format and appearance	Production and broadcast
1976	Sandokan	Sergio Sollima	x	Six-part serial.	Production began in late September 1974. Broadcast on RAI from 6 January to 8 February 1976.
1978	Return of the Saint	Jeremy Summers		Guest appearance: “Duel in Venice”.	Filmed in Venice; first broadcast in the United Kingdom on 24 September 1978. In Italy, the episode aired on RAI's Rete 1 on 10 August 1983 under the title “Duello a Venezia”.
1980	Questa sera parliamo di...	—		Continuity announcer.	Introduced afternoon and evening programmes in September 1980.
1981 (production)	L'assassino ha le ore contate	Fernando Di Leo	x	Six-part series; unbroadcast.	Filming was reported complete in May 1981. Six 45-minute episodes; unaired.
1983	Vuoto di memoria	Pier Nico Solinas		Two-part serial.	Broadcast on RAI’s TV1 on 30–31 March 1983.
1983–1984	La Chambre des dames	Yannick Andréi		Ten-part serial.	Filmed at Cinecittà and on location in Italy and France; broadcast in France on TF1 from 23 December 1983 to February 1984.
1984	I racconti del maresciallo	Giovanni Soldati	x	Episode: “La fine di Flok”.	Broadcast on Rai 2 on 4 April 1984.
1984	La ragazza dell'addio	Daniele D'Anza	x	Four-part serial.	Broadcast on Rai 1 from 3 to 24 June 1984.
1985	Non basta una vita	Mario Caiano		Thirty-part serial.	Produced in 1984. First broadcast on Retecapri in 1985. Shown on Rai 1 from 14 December 1988 to 24 January 1989.
1987	Sentiments	Giorgio Capitani		Television film: “David et David”; Italian title: David e David.	Italian–French television co-production (1987). Broadcast in France on Antenne 2 on 16 November 1987. Broadcast on Rai 3 on 26 December 1989.
1988 (production)	The Prince of Terror (Il maestro del terrore)	Lamberto Bava	x	Television film as part of Alta tensione.	Produced in 1988. Italian television broadcast on Italia 1 on 28 June 1999.
1989	Solo	Sandro Bolchi		Three-part serial.	Broadcast on Rai 2 from 8 to 10 November 1989.
1987	Canzonissime: la grande festa della musica	Gianni Brezza		Listed as a guest on the third episode, devoted to the Fonit-Cetra record label.	Broadcast on Rai 1 on 9 May 1987.
1990	Pronto soccorso	Francesco Massaro		First four-part serial.	Broadcast on Rai 1 from 4 to 25 March 1990.
1992	The World of Yor (Il mondo di Yor)	Antonio Margheriti		Four-part television version.	The production also yielded the 1983 theatrical film. Broadcast on Rai 1 from 1 to 4 June 1992.
2007	A Doctor in the Family (Un medico in famiglia)	Ugo Fabrizio Giordani		Two guest appearances in season 5.	“Ospite a sorpresa”: 22 May 2007. “Tutti i nodi vengono al pettine”: 29 May 2007.

=== Announced projects ===
These announcements are listed separately from completed screen appearances.

Year announced	Project	Director	Announcement and status
1975	Cenerentola	“Brian Fobbe” (as reported)	André was announced as the lead in a notice published on 18 May 1975.
1979	Superhuman	Riccardo Freda	André was named in the cast of this proposed film in 1979. The project was not completed.

== Bibliography ==
Lancia, Enrico; Melelli, Fabio (2005). Le straniere del nostro cinema (in Italian). Gremese Editore. pp. 13–14. ISBN 9788884403506.
