= H2S (disambiguation) =

H_{2}S is the chemical formula of hydrogen sulfide.

H2S may also refer to:

- Dynali H2S, a Belgian helicopter design
- H2S radar, the first airborne ground-mapping radar, used during World War II
- How to Succeed in Business Without Really Trying (book), a 1952 book written by Shepherd Mead and the inspiration for the musical of the same name
  - How to Succeed in Business Without Really Trying (musical), a 1961 musical adapted by Frank Loesser with Abe Burrows, Jack Weinstock, and Willie Gilbert
- H2S (film), a 1969 Italian film
- H2S, a Canadian postal code area in La Petite-Patrie, Montreal, Quebec
