= Indovina =

Indovina is an Italian surname. Notable people with the surname include:

- Franco Indovina (1932–1972), Italian film director and screenwriter
- Lorenza Indovina (born 1966), Italian actress
