= A Simple Heart =

A Simple Heart may refer to:

- "A Simple Heart" (short story), 1877, by Gustave Flaubert
- A Simple Heart (2008 film), a French film based on the short story
- A Simple Heart (1977 film), an Italian drama film
