= The Howl =

1970 film

- DVD cover
- Directed by: Tinto Brass
- Written by: Tinto Brass; Gian Carlo Fusco; Franco Longo; Gigi Proietti
- Starring: Tina Aumont
- Cinematography: Silvano Ippoliti
- Edited by: Tinto Brass
- Music by: Fiorenzo Carpi
- Release date: 27 June 1970
- Running time: 93 minutes
- Country: Italy
- Language: Italian

The Howl (Italian: L'urlo) is a 1970 Italian surrealist comedy film co-written and directed by Tinto Brass. It was entered into the 20th Berlin International Film Festival.

== Cast ==
- Tina Aumont as Anita
- Gigi Proietti as Coso
- Nino Segurini as Berto Bertuccioli
- Germano Longo
- Giorgio Gruden as night watchman
- Osiride Pevarello as cannibal philosopher
- Attilio Corsini
- Carla Cassola
- Sam Dorras as priest
- Tino Scotti as intellectual at school
- Edoardo Florio as Diogenes
