= Ante Up (film) =

1974 film

- DVD cover
- Directed by: Paolo Nuzzi
- Written by: Paolo Nuzzi; Piero Chiara; Maria Pia Sollima
- Produced by: Leo Pescarolo
- Starring: Aldo Maccione
- Cinematography: Arturo Zavattini
- Edited by: Antonio Siciliano
- Music by: Franco Micalizzi
- Distributed by: Variety Distribution
- Release date: 14 November 1974
- Running time: 108 minutes
- Country: Italy
- Language: Italian

Ante Up (Italian: Il piatto piange) is a 1974 Italian comedy film directed by Paolo Nuzzi. It is based on a novel by Piero Chiara. It was entered into the 25th Berlin International Film Festival.

== Plot ==
During the Mussolini era some young people meet frequently. They exchange stories about recent events while playing cards. Between their meetings they have different kinds of adventures.

== Cast ==
- Aldo Maccione - Camola
- Agostina Belli - Ines
- Andréa Ferréol - Lirica, the singer
- Erminio Macario - Brovelli, the fool (as Macario)
- Renato Pinciroli - Rimediotti
- Franco Diogene - Peppino, the barber
- Claudio Gora - the doctor
- Guido Leontini - Spreafico
- Armando Brancia - Giuseppe Migliavacca
- Daniele Vargas - the lawyer
- Maria Antonietta Beluzzi - Mamma Rosa
- Alessandra Cardini - (as Sandra Cardini)
- Nazzareno Natale - Bertinelli, the groom
- Giuseppe Maffioli - Venezia
- Bernard Blier - the priest
- Angelo Pellegrino - the photographer
