= Les hautes solitudes =

1974 film by Philippe Garrel

- Directed by: Philippe Garrel
- Written by: Philippe Garrel
- Produced by: Philippe Garrel
- Starring: Jean Seberg; Nico; Tina Aumont; Laurent Terzieff
- Cinematography: Philippe Garrel
- Edited by: Philippe Garrel
- Release date: 15 December 1974
- Running time: 80 minutes
- Country: France

Les hautes solitudes is a 1974 French experimental film written, directed and produced by Philippe Garrel. It stars Jean Seberg with Nico, Tina Aumont and Laurent Terzieff. Originally released in France in 1974, it was screened in New York's Metrograph in 2017.
