= The Brylcreem Boys =

1997 film by Terence Ryan

- Directed by: Terence Ryan
- Written by: Jamie Brown, Terence Ryan
- Produced by: Gabriel Byrne, Jamie Brown
- Starring: Billy Campbell; Angus Macfadyen; Jean Butler; Gabriel Byrne; Joe McGann; John Gordon Sinclair
- Cinematography: Gerry Lively
- Edited by: Emma E. Hickox
- Music by: Richard Hartley
- Distributed by: Guerilla Films
- Release date: 1998
- Running time: 124 min.
- Country: United Kingdom
- Language: English
- Budget: $6 million

The Brylcreem Boys is a 1998 romantic comedy film set in Ireland during the Second World War. The film, which stars Billy Campbell, Angus Macfadyen, Jean Butler and Gabriel Byrne, was directed and co written by Terence Ryan. The story is set against the extraordinary neutrality arrangements in Ireland during World War II.

The title comes from a popular nickname for the RAF personnel during the period. Not to be confused with the identically titled 1979 BBC2 TV play about RAF Bomber Command.

== Plot ==
During World War II, all Allied and Axis service personnel that end up in Ireland are to be interned for the duration of the conflict. Two pilots, one from the Royal Canadian Air Force, Miles Keogh, portrayed by Campbell and one from the Luftwaffe, Rudolph von Stengenbek, portrayed by Macfadyen, both fall in love with a local Irish girl, Mattie Guerin played by Butler. The relationship is further complicated by the unceasingly vigilant internment camp commander, Commandant O'Brien, played by Byrne.

== Cast ==
- Billy Campbell (credited as Bill Campbell) as Miles Keogh
- Jean Butler as Mattie Guerin
- Gabriel Byrne as Commandant O'Brien
- Hal Fowler as Bunty Winthrop
- Joe McGann as Captain Deegan
- Angus Macfadyen as Rudolph von Stegenbek
- William McNamara as Sam Gunn
- Jérôme Pradon (credited as Jerome Pradon) as Ricard
- John Gordon Sinclair as Richard Lewis
- Marc Sinden as Senior Allied Officer White
- Oliver Tobias as Hans Jorg Wolff
- Peter Woodward as Ernst Stossel
- Osmund Bullock as Bredding

== Production ==
Although set in Ireland, the film was made on location in the Isle of Man. It was the first major production to use the island since George Formby's No Limit in 1935. The film established the Isle of Man Film Commission.

Casting was by Jo Gilbert.

== See also ==
- Brylcreem
- Irish neutrality
