= Tina Aumont =

French-American actress (1946–2006)

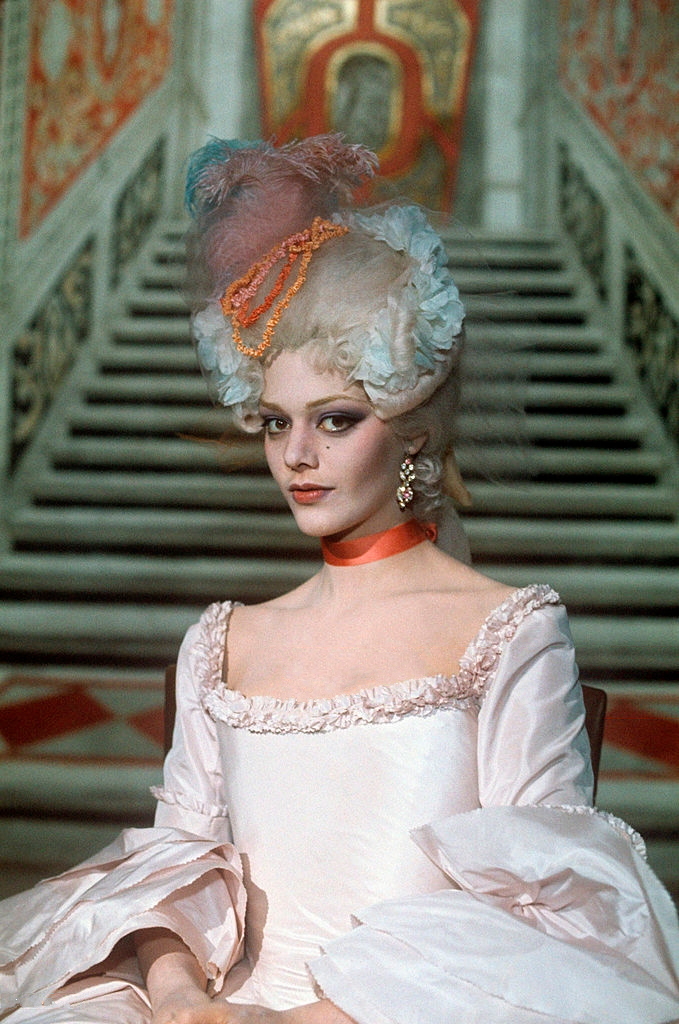
- Aumont in Fellini's Casanova (1976)
- Born: Maria Christina Aumont; February 14, 1946; Hollywood, California, U.S.
- Died: October 28, 2006 (aged 60); Port-Vendres, Occitanie, France
- Resting place: Montparnasse Cemetery, Paris, France
- Other name: Tina Marquand
- Occupation: Actress
- Years active: 1966–2000
- Spouse(s): Christian Marquand (m. 1963; div. 1967), François Ferrial (m. 1985)
- Parent(s): Jean-Pierre Aumont; Maria Montez
- Relatives: François Villiers (uncle)

Maria Christina "Tina" Aumont (February 14, 1946 – October 28, 2006) was a French and American actress. She was the daughter of French actor Jean-Pierre Aumont and Dominican actress Maria Montez. She made her acting debut in the British film Modesty Blaise (1966), but later had a prominent career as a leading lady in Italian films.

== Career ==
Aumont was billed as Tina Marquand (her married name, after she married French actor Christian Marquand, aged 17, in 1963) in four films, including Joseph Losey's Modesty Blaise (1966).

She was photographed by Angelo Frontoni (it) in 1968, when she had ankle/floor length hair, and some semi-nude pictures from this session were published in Playboy in 1969.

She worked in Italian cinema with, among others, Alberto Sordi (Scusi, lei è favorevole o contrario?, 1966), Tinto Brass (The Howl, 1970 and Salon Kitty, 1975), Sergio Martino (Torso, 1973), Mauro Bolognini (Drama of the Rich, 1974), Francesco Rosi (Illustrious Corpses, 1975), and Federico Fellini (Fellini's Casanova, 1976). She also played Lonetta, the Indian maiden, in Texas Across the River (1966), Luciana in Malicious (1973) and Valentina in A Matter of Time (1976) also starring Liza Minnelli. She starred in Lifespan (1975) with Klaus Kinski.

== Death ==
In 2000, she retired from film work. In 2006, she suffered a pulmonary embolism and died in Port-Vendres, Pyrénées-Orientales, France aged 60.

== Partial filmography ==
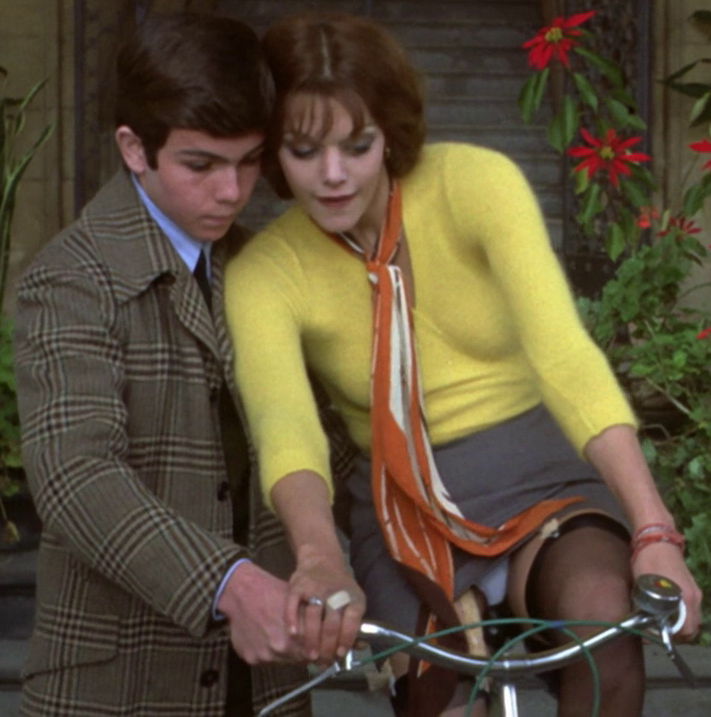
Aumont with Alessandro Momo in Malicious (1973)

- Modesty Blaise (1966) - Nicole
- The Game Is Over (1966) - Anne Sernet
- Texas Across the River (1966) - Lonetta
- Pardon, Are You For or Against? (1966) - Romina
- Man, Pride and Vengeance (1967) - Carmen / Conchita
- Your Turn to Die (1967) - Dolly
- Partner (1968) - Salesgirl
- Alibi (1969) - Filli
- Satyricon (1969) - Circe
- Giacomo Casanova: Childhood and Adolescence (1969) - Marcella
- Come ti chiami, amore mio? (1969)
- Metello (1970) - Idina
- The Howl (1970) - Anita Annigoni
- Corbari (1970) - Ines
- Necropolis (1970)
- The Virgin's Bed (1970) - Prisoner
- Il sergente Klems (1971) - Leila
- White Sister (1972) - Mrs. Ricci
- Arcana (1972) - Brenda
- Master of Love (1972) - Dirce
- Torso (1973) - Daniela / college student
- Malicious (1973) - Luciana
- Storia de fratelli e de cortelli (1973) - Mara
- Blu Gang e vissero per sempre felici e ammazzati (1973) - Polly
- Les hautes solitudes (1974) - Tina
- The Murri Affair (1974) - Rosa Bonetti
- Il trafficone (1974) - Laura
- Lifespan (1975) - Anna
- The Divine Nymph (1975) - Woman at party (uncredited)
- The Messiah (1975) - Adulteress
- La principessa nuda (1976) - Gladys
- Illustrious Corpses (1976) - The prostitute
- Salon Kitty (1976) - Herta Wallenberg
- Giovannino (1976) - Nelly
- A Matter of Time (1976) - Valentina
- Fellini's Casanova (1976) - Henriette / Casanova's lover
- A Simple Heart (1977) - Virginia
- La deuxième femme (1978) - Herself
- Holocaust parte seconda: i ricordi, i deliri, la vendetta (1980) - Dorothea's Mother
- Rebelote (1984) - La bouchère
- Les frères Pétard (1986)
- ZEN - Zona Espansione Nord (1988)
- Sale comme un ange (1991) - (scenes deleted)
  - Nico-Icon (1995) - (documentary)
- Les deux orphelines vampires (1997) - La Goule
- Giulia (1999) - La Mère / Mother
  - Victoire (2000)
- La mécanique des femmes (2000) - (final film role)
