= Arturo Zavattini =

Italian photographer and cinematographer

- Born: 15 July 1930 (age 95); Luzzara, Italy
- Occupation(s): Photographer; Cinematographer; Camera operator
- Years active: 1949-present
- Parent: Cesare Zavattini

Arturo Zavattini (born 15 July 1930) is an Italian photographer and cinematographer.

== Biography ==
Son of Cesare Zavattini, he began to take an interest in photography in 1949, when his father gave him a camera as a gift. In 1951 he began working in the world of cinema thanks to Vittorio De Sica who introduced him to Aldo Graziati, director of photography of Umberto D., after which he continued his career in the photography department as an assistant operator, operator and director of photography.

As a photographer, he accompanied Ernesto de Martino on his ethnographic expedition to Lucania in June 1952.

Since the death of his father, he devoted himself entirely to the care of the Cesare Zavattini Archive.

== Partial filmography ==
=== Cinematographer ===
- The Voyeur (1970)
- Scipio the African (1971)
- Trastevere (1971)
- Watch Out, We're Mad! (1974)
- Il lumacone (1974)
- Ante Up (1974)
- Giovannino (1976)
- A Simple Heart (1977)
