= Giovannino (film) =

1976 Italian comedy film

- Directed by: Paolo Nuzzi
- Written by: Paolo Nuzzi; Bruno Di Geronimo
- Produced by: Leo Pescarolo
- Starring: Christian De Sica
- Cinematography: Arturo Zavattini
- Music by: Franco Micalizzi
- Release date: 1976
- Running time: 110 minutes
- Country: Italy
- Language: Italian

Giovannino is a 1976 Italian comedy film written and directed by Paolo Nuzzi and starring Christian De Sica, Tina Aumont, Jenny Tamburi and Carole André. It is based on a novel of the same name by Ercole Patti.

== Plot summary ==
Giovannino follows a young man in fascist‑era Catania whose romantic entanglements and family pressure push him from Sicily to Rome, where he searches for independence but remains caught between desire and obligation.

== Cast ==
- Christian De Sica as Giovannino Calò
- Tina Aumont as Nelly
- Jenny Tamburi as Marcella
- Carole André as Anna
- Delia Boccardo as Margherita Pagnol
- María Mercader as Peppina, Giovannino's Mother
- Saro Urzì as Giovannino's Father
- Imma Piro as Agata
- Piero Vida as Giuseppe Puglisi
- Miguel Bosé as Ignazio Leotta
- Giuliana Calandra

== Production ==
At a press conference in February 1976, novelist Ercole Patti said that, judging from the work in progress, he considered Giovannino the first faithful screen adaptation of one of his novels.

== See also ==
- List of Italian films of 1976
