= Tony Park =

Australian author (born 1964)

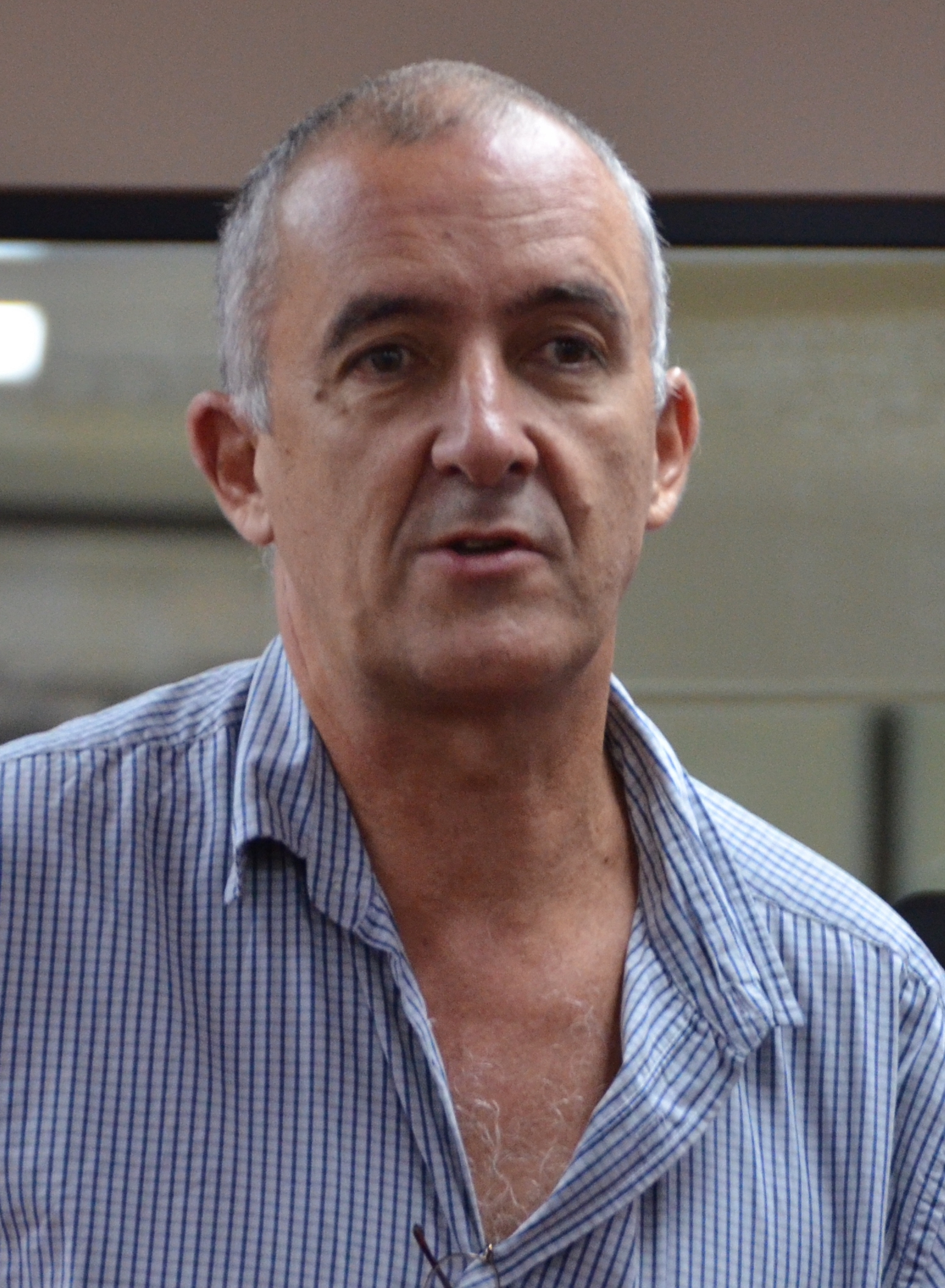
Park in 2013

Tony Park (born 1964) is an Australian author of thriller and non-fiction books. Park has worked as a newspaper reporter, public relations consultant, freelance writer, and as a government press secretary, in addition to writing numerous novels and non-fiction books. He also served in the Australian Army Reserve for 34 years, including a 6-month tour in Afghanistan in 2002 as a public affairs officer.

== Life and career ==
Park was born in 1964 in Taupō, New Zealand, he moved to Sydney, Australia at the age of three and grew up in Campbelltown in South Western Sydney. Park attended Campbelltown Public School and Campbelltown East Public School. Park also attended St Gregory's College, Campbelltown, and was awarded dux in 1981. Park also did a journalism cadetship at The Glebe and Western Weekly newspaper in Glebe from 1984 to 1987. He worked as a journalist at the St George and Sutherland Shire Leader in 1987–88. He worked as a press secretary for NSW Premier Nick Greiner from 1988 to 1991. He worked as press secretary for the NSW Minister for Justice and Police from 1991 to 1993. Park also worked as a journalist for the Bucks Herald and Bucks Advertiser newspapers in Buckinghamshire, UK, from 1993 to 1994. Park was a PR consultant for International Public Relations, Crows Nest, Sydney, from 1994 to 1996.

Park quit his job in 1996 and gave up his career as a journalist to follow his dream of being a full-time writer. His first novel, set in the outback during WWII, failed to get published. Had a second attempt at writing a novel while travelling in Africa in 1998, and this one was accepted by Pan Macmillan Australia, and published in 2004 as Far Horizon. He and his wife spend half of every year living in a private nature reserve near the Kruger National Park in South Africa. Park is an avid supporter of several charities concerned with wildlife and people in Africa, he is a patron of Painted Dog Conservation Inc., a charity that is dedicated to protecting the painted dog in Africa.

== Military service ==
Tony Park served in the Australian Army Reserves in a variety of roles.

1982–1984 served as a rifleman, Sydney University Regiment, Royal Australian Infantry

1984–1996 – served as an Air Dispatcher and Air Dispatch Crew Commander corporal with 177 Air Dispatch Squadron, Royal Australian Corps of Transport

1996 – 2016 – served as a captain in the Australian Army Public Relations Service, including brief deployments to Papua New Guinea and Easter Timor. In 2002 served as the Public Affairs Officer for the Australian Special Operations Task Group in Afghanistan from July–December 2002.

== Novels ==
Tony Park is the author of 19 novels set in Africa and six non fiction biographies. Park combines his background as a major in the Australia Army Reserve and his love of Africa to write his novels.

=== Fiction ===
- Far Horizon, Pan Macmillan 2004
- Zambezi, Pan Macmillan 2005
- African Sky, Pan Macmillan 2006
- Safari, Pan Macmillan 2007
- Silent Predator, Pan Macmillan 2008
- Ivory Pan Macmillan 2009
- The Delta, Pan Macmillan 2010
- African Dawn, Pan Macmillan 2011
- Dark Heart, Pan Macmillan 2012
- The Prey, Pan Macmillan 2013
- The Hunter, Pan Macmillan] 2014
- An Empty Coast, Pan Macmillan 2015
- Red Earth, Pan Macmillan 2016
- The Cull, Pan Macmillan 2017
- Captive, Pan Macmillan 2018
- Scent of Fear, Pan Macmillan, 2018
- Ghosts of the Past, Pan Macmillan, 2019
- Last Survivor, Pan Macmillan, 2020
- Blood Trail, Pan Macmillan, 2021
- The Pride, Pan Macmillan, 2022
- Vendetta, Pan Macmillan, 2023
- The Protector, Pan Macmillan, 2024
- Die By The Sword, Pan Macmillan, 2025

=== Non fiction ===
- Part of the Pride: My Life Among the Big Cats of Africa, with Kevin Richardson, 2009
- War Dogs, with Shane Bryant, 2010 (re-released 2010)
- The Grey Man, with John Curtis, 2011
- Bush Vet, with Dr Clay Wilson, 2013
- Courage Under Fire, with Daniel Keighran, VC, 2020
- No One Left Behind, with Keith Payne, VC, 2021

== Linked Books ==
- The ‘Sonja Kurtz Series’ – Tough former female mercenary Sonja Kurtz has proved to be one of Park's most popular characters with his audiences. The ‘Sonja’ books in order are as follows: The Delta, An Empty Coast, The Cull, Last Survivor, The Pride
- Zimbabwean saga, – 'African Sky’ and ‘African Dawn’, ‘African Sky’ takes place in 1943, during the Second World War, and ‘African Dawn’ picks up the story of the Bryant, Ngwenya and Quilter-Phipps families from 1959 to the present.
- Detective Sannie van Rensburg - A recurring character in some of Parks books is the intrepid, brave and clever Captain Sannie (Susan) van Rensburg. Sannie first appears in ‘Silent Predator’ as the leading lady, and reappears later as an investigating officer (in minor roles) in some other books. The order in which she appears: 'Silent Predator', 'Dark Heart', 'The Hunter', 'Red Earth', 'The Cull', Captive', Blood Trail, Vendetta, Die by the Sword
- Jed Banks - Jed Banks is a US special forces soldier and CIA agent. Jed debuts as the leading man in Zambezi, but he's been known to emerge from the shadows in a few other stories. Here's the order in which Jed comes appears; 'Zambezi', 'Red Earth', 'Scent of Fear'
- Shane Castle - First appearing in a starring role in ‘Safari’, Shane is a Zimbabwean-born ex Australian SAS soldier, who returns to his African homeland to join the war on poaching. Shane appears a second time in ‘Red Earth’ as a hired gun.

== Influences ==
Park has said that his favourite author of fiction set in Africa is John Gordon Davis, whose first novel, Hold My Hand I'm Dying, set in Rhodesia (now Zimbabwe) was an international bestseller. Park also wrote the foreword to ‘Hold My Hand’, a biography of Gordon Davis, by David Hilton- Barber.
