= The Murri Affair =

1974 film by Mauro Bolognini

- Italian theatrical release poster
- Italian: Fatti di gente perbene
- Directed by: Mauro Bolognini
- Written by: Sergio Bazzini
- Produced by: Giovanni Di Clemente
- Starring: Giancarlo Giannini; Catherine Deneuve; Fernando Rey; Tina Aumont; Rina Morelli; Ettore Manni; Paolo Bonacelli; Giacomo Rossi Stuart; Lino Troisi; Laura Betti; Corrado Pani; Marcel Bozzuffi
- Cinematography: Ennio Guarnieri
- Edited by: Nino Baragli
- Music by: Ennio Morricone
- Production companies: Filmarpa; Lira Films
- Distributed by: PAC (Italy); Lugo Films (France)
- Release dates: 28 September 1974 (Italy); 2 April 1975 (France)
- Running time: 120 minutes
- Countries: Italy; France
- Language: Italian

The Murri Affair (Italian: Fatti di gente perbene, lit. 'Facts of Decent People'; French: La grande bourgeoise, lit. 'The Great Bourgeois') is a 1974 historical drama film directed by Mauro Bolognini and starring Giancarlo Giannini and Catherine Deneuve. It is based on real events of a notorious 1902 murder trial. It was awarded with a David di Donatello for Best Film.

== Plot ==
Linda Murri, the daughter of a liberal wealthy family, was raised under lenient sexual mores, and now is suffocating in a marriage to a conservative doctor. Her brother, an intense young man who wastes his time on whores and gambling, can no longer watch his sister suffer. He plots the murder of her husband, and through the crime lays bare a society feeding on unspeakable passions and illicit actions.

== Cast ==
- Giancarlo Giannini as Tullio Murri
- Catherine Deneuve as Linda Murri
- Fernando Rey as Augusto Murri
- Tina Aumont as Rosa Bonetti
- Rina Morelli as Giannina Murri
- Ettore Manni as Dr. Carlo Secchi
- Paolo Bonacelli as Francesco Bonmartini
- Giacomo Rossi Stuart as Riccardo Murri
- Laura Betti as Tisa Borghi
- Corrado Pani as Pio Naldi
- Marcel Bozzuffi as Inspector Stanzani
- Lino Troisi

== Reception ==
Film Critic John Simon wrote "La Grande Bourgeoise is, like most of the films of Mauro Bolognini, failed art, the sort of thing that leaves a bad taste in the soul".
