= Tulips of Haarlem =

1970 film

- Film poster
- Directed by: Franco Brusati
- Written by: Sergio Bazzini; Franco Brusati
- Produced by: Turi Vasile
- Starring: Carole André
- Cinematography: Luciano Tovoli
- Edited by: Mario Morra
- Music by: Benedetto Ghiglia
- Release date: 13 August 1970
- Running time: 102 minutes
- Country: Italy
- Language: Italian

Tulips of Haarlem (Italian: I tulipani di Haarlem) is a 1970 Italian drama film directed by Franco Brusati. It was entered into the 1970 Cannes Film Festival.

== Cast ==
- Carole André - Sarah
- Pierre Cressoy
- Gianni Garko - Bernardo
- Frank Grimes - Pierre
- Gianni Giuliano - Gustave

== Production ==
Franco Brusati and Sergio Bazzini wrote the screenplay. It was published in 1970 by the Istituto di Propaganda Libraria in Milan as one of the first two volumes in Copioni cinematografici, a series edited by film critic Pietro Bianchi. Writing in Il Dramma, Massimo Mida noted that Brusati rarely departed from the screenplay during filming.

== Reception ==
Mida regarded Tulips of Haarlem as Brusati's most mature and convincing film to date. He praised the care with which Brusati developed the characters and the way the setting contributed to the drama. A review signed "l. p." in Stampa Sera noted the film's gradual shift from realism to symbolism and praised the pearly quality of Luciano Tovoli's cinematography.
