= Oh, Grandmother's Dead =

1969 film

- Film poster
- Directed by: Mario Monicelli
- Written by: Luigi Malerba; Mario Monicelli; Luisa Montagnana; Stefano Strucchi
- Produced by: Franco Cristaldi
- Starring: Sergio Tofano
- Cinematography: Luigi Kuveiller
- Edited by: Ruggero Mastroianni
- Music by: Piero Piccioni
- Release date: 9 October 1969
- Running time: 89 minutes
- Country: Italy
- Language: Italian

Oh, Grandmother's Dead (Italian: Toh, è morta la nonna!) is a 1969 Italian black comedy film, directed by Mario Monicelli and starring Sergio Tofano.

== Cast ==
- Sirena Adgemova as Sparta
- Carole André as Claretta
- Wanda Capodaglio as Adelaide Ghia, the grandmother
- Peter Chatel as Guido
- Valentina Cortese as Ornella
- Giuseppina Cozzi
- Luigi De Vittorio as Don Mario
- Riccardo Garrone as Galeazzo
- Vera Gherarducci as Gigliola
- Ray Lovelock as Carlo Alberto
- Gastone Pescucci as Adolfo
- Giorgio Piazza as Italo
- Helena Ronee as Titina
- Gianni Scolari as Carlo Maria
- Sergio Tofano as the grandfather
