= The Voyeur (1970 film) =

- Directed by: Franco Indovina
- Written by: Tonino Guerra; Franco Indovina
- Produced by: Franco Indovina; Adriano Magistretti; Danilo Marciani
- Starring: Timothy Dalton; Marcello Mastroianni
- Cinematography: Arturo Zavattini
- Edited by: Roberto Perpignani
- Music by: Ennio Morricone
- Release date: 26 November 1970
- Running time: 105 minutes
- Country: Italy
- Language: Italian

The Voyeur (Italian: Giuochi particolari) is a 1970 Italian drama film directed by Franco Indovina.

== Cast ==
- Timothy Dalton as Mark
- Virna Lisi as Claude
- Marcello Mastroianni as Sandro
- John Serret
- Aram Stephan
