= Eugenio (film) =

- Italian theatrical release poster
- Directed by: Luigi Comencini
- Written by: Luigi Comencini; Massimo Patrizi
- Starring: Dalila Di Lazzaro; Saverio Marconi
- Cinematography: Carlo Carlini
- Edited by: Nino Baragli
- Music by: Fiorenzo Carpi
- Production companies: Intercontinental Film Company; Les films du losange Gaumont
- Distributed by: Gaumont
- Release dates: 5 September 1980 (Italy); 18 February 1981 (France)
- Running time: 103 minutes
- Countries: Italy; France
- Language: Italian

Eugenio (Italian: Voltati Eugenio, lit. 'Turn Around Eugenio') is a 1980 Italian comedy drama film co-written and directed by Luigi Comencini.

It entered the 37th Venice International Film Festival. The film won the David di Donatello for best score.

== Plot ==
Eugenio is brought up by his grandparents because his father and his mother split up soon after his birth. The story of his parents is told by flashbacks.

== Cast ==
- Dalila Di Lazzaro as Fernanda
- Saverio Marconi as Giancarlo
- Francesco Bonelli as Eugenio
- Carole André as Milena
- Bernard Blier as Grandpa Eugenio
- Dina Sassoli as Grandma Anna
- Gisella Sofio as Grandma Edvige
- José Luis de Villalonga as Tristano
- Memè Perlini as Giancarlo's friend
