= A Simple Heart (1977 film) =

1970 drama film

- Directed by: Giorgio Ferrara
- Screenplay by: Cesare Zavattini
- Starring: Adriana Asti; Joe Dallesandro; Tina Aumont; Alida Valli
- Cinematography: Arturo Zavattini
- Edited by: Roberto Perpignani
- Music by: Franco Mannino
- Release date: 1977
- Language: Italian

A Simple Heart (Italian: Un cuore semplice) is a 1977 Italian drama film directed by Giorgio Ferrara, in his directorial debut. It was screened at the 30th Cannes Film Festival.

== Cast ==
- Adriana Asti as Félicité
- Joe Dallesandro as Théodore
- Tina Aumont as Virginie
- Alida Valli as Mathilde Aubain
- Alberto Asti as Paolo
- Ugo Bologna as the doctor
- Elvira Cortese as Simona
- Laura De Marchi as Félicité's sister
- Carlo De Mejo as adult Paolo
- Antonio Falsi as Eugerol
- Mario Maranzana as the lawyer
- Leonardo Treviglio as the coach
- Loris Zanchi as the fisherman
- Jole Silvani

== Production ==
The film is an adaptation of Gustave Flaubert's short story with the same name. In the years prior, Vittorio De Sica made several attempts to make his own adaptation of the story. It was produced by Cooperativa Nashira with FilmCoop.

== Release ==
The film was screened out of competition at the 1977 Cannes Film Festival.

== Reception ==
The film was a box office disappointment. A contemporary Variety review described it as a "beautifully limned, porcelain-fine film" and "a superb piece of filmmaking". A Corriere della Sera review called it "more a careful transcription than a reinvention of Flaubert", distinguished by "its passionate seriousness, deep respect for the realist tradition, [...] and meticulous attention to period detail".

For this film Giorgio Ferrara won a special David di Donatello and a Nastro d'Argento for Best New Director.
