= Paolo Nuzzi =

Italian film director

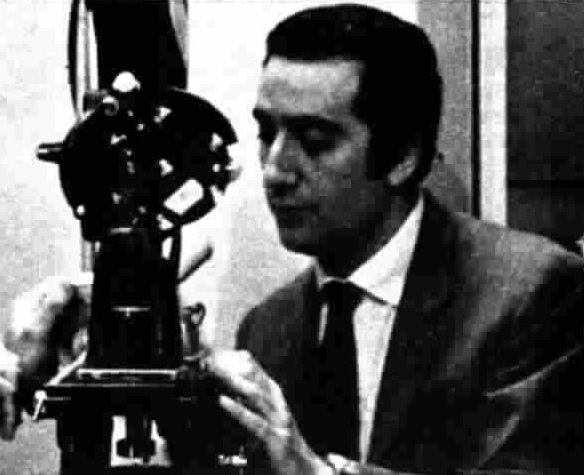
- Born: 2 December 1939; Naples, Italy
- Died: 10 March 2018 (aged 78); Rome, Italy
- Occupations: Film director Screenwriter
- Years active: 1964-1976

Paolo Nuzzi (2 December 1939 – 10 March 2018) was an Italian film director and screenwriter. He directed four films between 1964 and 1976. His 1974 film Il piatto piange was entered into the 25th Berlin International Film Festival.

== Filmography ==
- Ecco il finimondo (1964)
- La donna scomparsa (1970)
- Il piatto piange (1974)
- Giovannino (1976)
