= Frank Grimes =

Irish actor (1947–2025)

- Grimes in The Casebook of Sherlock Holmes (ITV, 1991)
- Born: 9 March 1947; Dublin, Ireland
- Died: 1 August 2025 (aged 78)
- Occupation: Actor
- Years active: 1967–2017

Francis Patrick Grimes (9 March 1947 – 1 August 2025) was an Irish stage and screen actor.

== Life and career ==
Grimes was born in Dublin on 9 March 1947. He achieved his first major success as the young Brendan Behan in the 1967 stage adaptation of Behan's autobiography, Borstal Boy, at the Abbey Theatre. When the production moved to Broadway, Grimes was nominated for a Tony Award for best actor.

In 1970 the Italian director, Franco Zeffirelli, offered Grimes the lead role of Francis of Assisi in his biographical film, Brother Sun, Sister Moon. However, director and actor fell out over how the part should be played and Grimes was replaced by Graham Faulkner.

In the early 1970s, Grimes moved to London where he came to the attention of director Lindsay Anderson. Anderson offered him a part in his production of David Storey's play The Farm, the success of which established Grimes' reputation in British theatre.

Grimes' most significant film role was the part of Major Fuller in Richard Attenborough's A Bridge Too Far (1977). However, he was probably best known, in his native Ireland at least, for his performance as Father O'Connor in RTÉ's drama series, Strumpet City. In 1981, Grimes received a Jacob's Award "for his detailed and exceptionally convincing portrayal" of the young priest.

Frank Grimes continued to work in television, films and theatre throughout his later years. Later TV appearances included the recurrent role of Barry Connor in Coronation Street. In 2013 he appeared as Mrs McCarthy's husband in the Father Brown episode "The Mayor and the Magician".

Grimes died following a short illness on 1 August 2025, at the age of 78.

== Filmography ==
Year	Title	Role
1970	Tulips of Haarlem	Pierre
1975	Royal Flash	Lieutenant
1977	A Bridge Too Far	Major Fuller
1979	The Outsider	Tony Coyle
1981	The Funhouse	Strip Show Voyeur
1982	Give Us This Day	Robert Treswell
1982	Britannia Hospital	Sammy / Voice of Genesis
1987	Crystalstone	Captain
1987	The Whales of August	Mr. Beckwith
1990	The Dive	Dobrolsky
1994	War of the Buttons	Christian Brother
2000	When the Sky Falls	Paul McCarling
2005	Anything for Love	Mr. Jones
