= Franco Indovina =

Italian film director (1932–1972)

- Born: 1932; Palermo, Sicily, Italy
- Died: 4 May 1972 (aged 39–40); Palermo, Sicily, Italy
- Occupations: Film director Screenwriter
- Years active: 1965–1971
- Children: Lorenza Indovina, Francesca Indovina

Franco Indovina (1932 – 5 May 1972) was an Italian film director and screenwriter. In 1959, he was assistant to Michelangelo Antonioni on the set of L'Avventura. He directed six films between 1965 and 1971.

He died when Alitalia Flight 112 crashed on approach to Palermo. His 1967 film Lo scatenato was shown as part of a retrospective on Italian comedy at the 67th Venice International Film Festival.

The actress Lorenza Indovina, born in 1966, is his daughter.

== Filmography ==
- Menage all'italiana (1965)
- I tre volti (1965)
- Lo scatenato (1967)
- Le plus vieux métier du monde (1967)
- Giochi particolari (1970)
- Tre nel mille (1971)
