= Blind Justice (1988 film) =

- Theatrical release poster
- Directed by: Terence Ryan
- Written by: Mark Ezra
- Based on: Hold My Hand I'm Dying by John Gordon Davis
- Produced by: Mark Cassidy; Christopher Coy
- Starring: Christopher Cazenove; Oliver Reed; Patrick Shai; Edita Brychta
- Cinematography: Hanro Möhr
- Edited by: David Heitner; Max Lemon
- Music by: Julian Laxton; Fransua Roos; Patric van Blerk
- Release date: 1988
- Running time: 90 minutes
- Country: United Kingdom
- Language: English

Blind Justice (also known as Hold My Hand I'm Dying) is a 1988 drama film directed by Terence Ryan and starring Christopher Cazenove, Oliver Reed, Patrick Shai, and Edita Brychta. It was written by Mark Ezra. Based on the 1967 book Hold My Hand I'm Dying by John Gordon Davis, it was commercially released in Italy in October 1988.

== Plot ==
When the British territory of Southern Rhodesia issues a unilateral declaration of independence (UDI) in 1965, it means freedom and hope for some; despair, fear, and death for others. The one thing certain is that nobody can escape the changes it will bring - least of all Joseph Mahoney, the last colonial commissioner in Kariba Gorge, who finds himself charged with a vast region thrown into turmoil as UDI becomes reality. With the assistance of Afrikaner naturalist Suzie de Villiers (whose abusive Calvinist Boer father does not want her around Joseph because Joseph is English) and his loyal Ndebele employee Sampson, Mahoney finds himself struggling to see justice administered to all despite unsympathetic colonists, tribal intrigues, and a mounting rural insurgency. Meanwhile, Sampson finds himself torn between his commitment to ZAPU nationalists and his friendship with Joseph. After Mahoney settles permanently in Rhodesia on Suzie's farm, ZIPRA orders Sampson to bomb the homestead; the latter is appalled, and only carries out his attack when his employers are away.

Captured by the Rhodesian Security Forces, Sampson now stands trial for attempted murder - while Joseph leads an increasingly desperate race against the clock to secure a pardon, win back an estranged Suzie, and try to stop his adopted homeland from being plunged into a fresh wave of bloodletting and vengeance.

== Cast ==
- Christopher Cazenove as Joseph Mahoney
- Edita Brychta as Suzie de Villiers
- Oliver Reed as Ballinger
- Patrick Shai
- Henry Cele as Kamisu

== Production ==
Blind Justice was filmed in the Mashonaland region of northeastern Zimbabwe and in the area around the Bumi Hills area near Lake Kariba where the story is set.

== Music and soundtrack ==
The song "Paradise Road" that appears in the film was sung by Dobie Gray. The music for the film was by Julian Laxton, Fransua Roos, and Patric van Blerk.
