= Christopher Cazenove =

English actor (1943–2010)

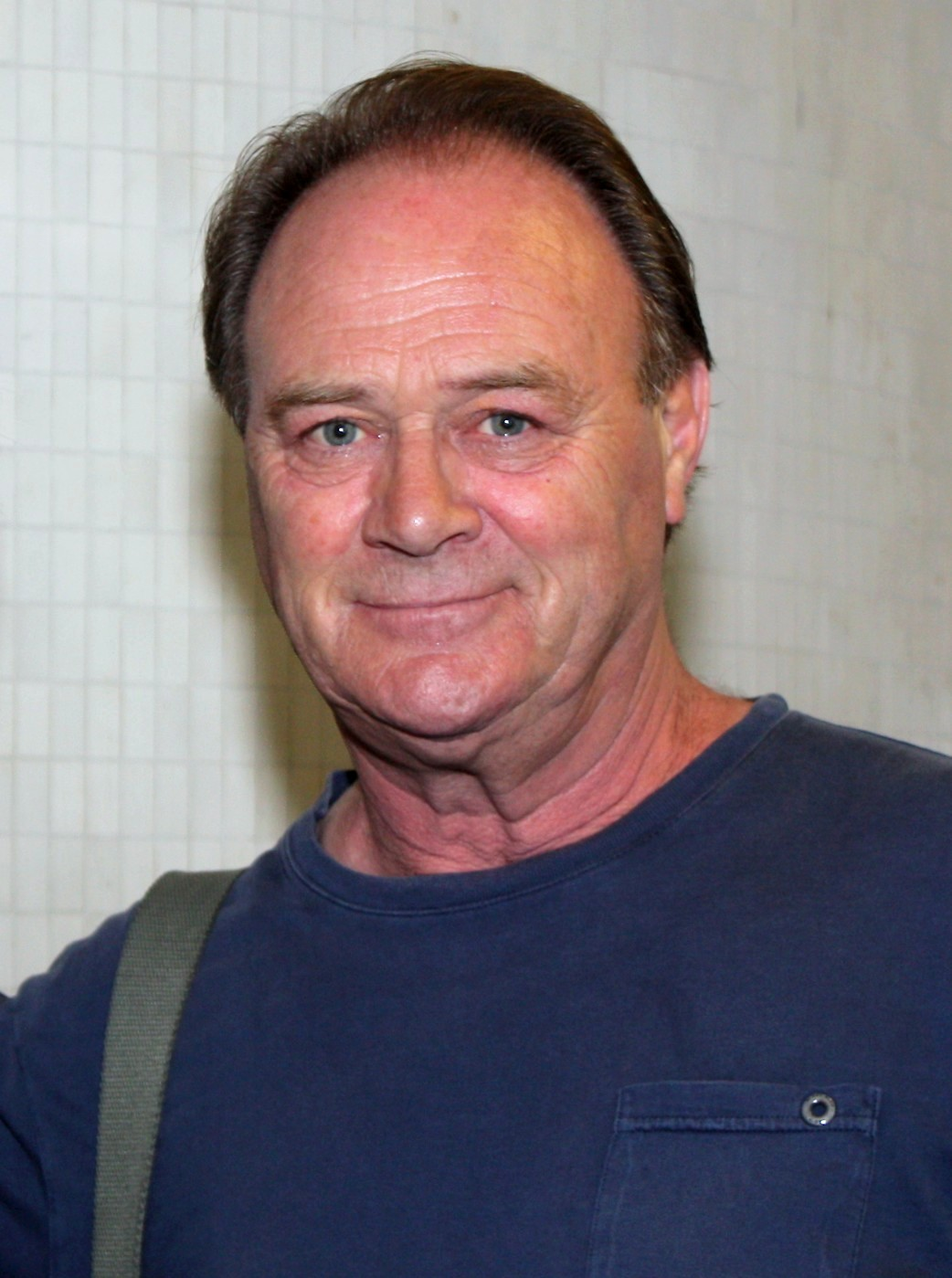
- Cazenove in 2009
- Born: Christopher de Lerisson Cazenove; 17 December 1943; Winchester, Hampshire, England
- Died: 7 April 2010 (aged 66); London, England
- Occupation: Actor
- Years active: 1970–2010
- Television: The Duchess of Duke Street, Judge John Deed; Dynasty
- Spouse: Angharad Rees (m. 1973; div. 1994)
- Children: 2

Christopher de Lerisson Cazenove (17 December 1943 – 7 April 2010) was an English film, television and stage actor.

== Early life and career ==
He was born Christopher de Lerisson Cazenove, on 17 December 1943, the son of Brigadier Arnold de Lerisson Cazenove and Elizabeth Laura (née Gurney, 1914–1994) in Winchester, Hampshire, but was brought up in Bowlish, Somerset. He was educated at the Dragon School, Eton College, Durham University's College of the Venerable Bede and the Bristol Old Vic Theatre School.

Cazenove often portrayed British aristocrats, and first made his name in the 1972 drama series, The Regiment. Other notable roles included Charlie Tyrrell in the 1976-77 period drama series The Duchess of Duke Street, and in 1986 he appeared as Ben Carrington in the US soap opera Dynasty, which he played until the following year. From 2001 to 2003, he had a recurring role in the British drama series Judge John Deed, playing Row Colemore.

On the stage, he appeared as Henry Higgins in the British and American productions of My Fair Lady from 2005 through to 2008. He also starred in the London West End production of The Importance of Being Earnest in 1994 alongside Susannah York.

== Personal life ==
Cazenove was married to actress Angharad Rees from 1973 until their divorce in 1994. They had two sons, Linford James (20 July 1974 – 10 September 1999); and Rhys William (born 1976); Linford died in a car crash on the M11 in Essex. From 2003 until his death, Cazenove's partner was Isabel Davis.

== Death ==
In February 2010, Cazenove collapsed at his London home. He was taken to St Thomas' Hospital in London, suffering from septicaemia. He died on 7 April 2010 from the effects of the illness at St Thomas' Hospital, aged 66. The actor "died peacefully surrounded by his loved ones", said a statement released by his agent, his family and girlfriend.

Cazenove's funeral on 16 April 2010 was held at St Paul's, Covent Garden, London.

== Filmography ==
=== Film ===
Year	Title	Role	Notes
1970	Julius Caesar	Servant to Mark Antony	Uncredited
1970	There's a Girl in My Soup	Nigel	Uncredited
1974	Doctor Watson and the Darkwater Hall Mystery	Sir Harry	
1975	Royal Flash	Eric Hansen	
1977	East of Elephant Rock	Robert Proudfoot	
1978	La petite fille en velours bleu (aka Little Girl in Blue Velvet)	"Baby"	
1979	Zulu Dawn	Lieutenant Coghill	
1981	Eye of the Needle	David Rose	
1981	From a Far Country	Tadek	
1983	Heat and Dust	Douglas Rivers, The Assistant Collector	(The Nineteen Twenties in the Civil Lines at Satipur); Merchant Ivory Film
1984	Until September	Philip	
1985	Jenny's War	Captain Preston	TV series, 4 episodes
1985	Mata Hari	Karl Von Bayerling	
1986	The Fantasist	Inspector McMyler	
1988	Windmills of the Gods	Desforges	TV Mini-Series, 2 episodes
1988	Tears in the Rain	Michael Bredon	TV movie
1988	Blind Justice	Joseph Mahoney	Also known as Hold My Hand I'm Dying
1989	Souvenir	William Root	
1989	The Lady and the Highwayman	Rudolph Vyne	TV movie
1990	3 Men and a Little Lady	Edward Hargreave	
1992	Aces: Iron Eagle III	Palmer	
1996	The Proprietor	Elliott Spencer	Merchant Ivory Film
1998	Shadow Run	Melchior	
2000	Contaminated Man	The President of Clarion	
2001	A Knight's Tale	John Thatcher	
2001	Beginner's Luck	Andrew Fontaine	
2004	La Femme Musketeer	Athos	TV Mini-Series, 2 episodes
2009	Hotel Babylon	Damien Rushby	TV series, 1 episode
2010	Alexander the Great from Macedonia	Aristotle	(final film role)

=== Television ===
- 1972-1973 The Regiment
- 1973 Omnibus: The British Hero (BBC TV documentary/selected dramatised scenes) as Heroes: Tom Brown / Richard Hannay / Beau Geste / Bulldog Drummond / James Bond
- 1974 Thriller Episode: "K is for Killing" as Sunny Garrick
- 1974 Jennie, Lady Randolph Churchill as George Cornwallis-West
- 1976-1977 Duchess of Duke Street as Charlie Tyrrell
- 1980 Hammer House of Horror Episode: "Children of the Full Moon" as Tom Martin
- 1981 Ladykillers Episode: A Smile Is Sometimes Worth a Million Dollars as Ronald True
- 1982 The Letter (1982 film) as Officer Withers
- 1982 The Agatha Christie Hour as Jack Trent
- 1984 Hammer House of Mystery and Suspense Episode: "In Possession" as Frank Daly
- 1985 Kane & Abel as The Baron
- 1986-1987 Dynasty as Ben Carrington
- 1989 A Fine Romance (1989 TV series) as Michael Trent
- 2001-2003 Judge John Deed as "Row" Colemore
- 2004 Charmed as Thrask
- 2005 Dalziel and Pascoe –Episode: "Dead Meat", Parts 1 and 2 as Guy Latimer
