= Oliver Reed =

English actor (1938–1999)

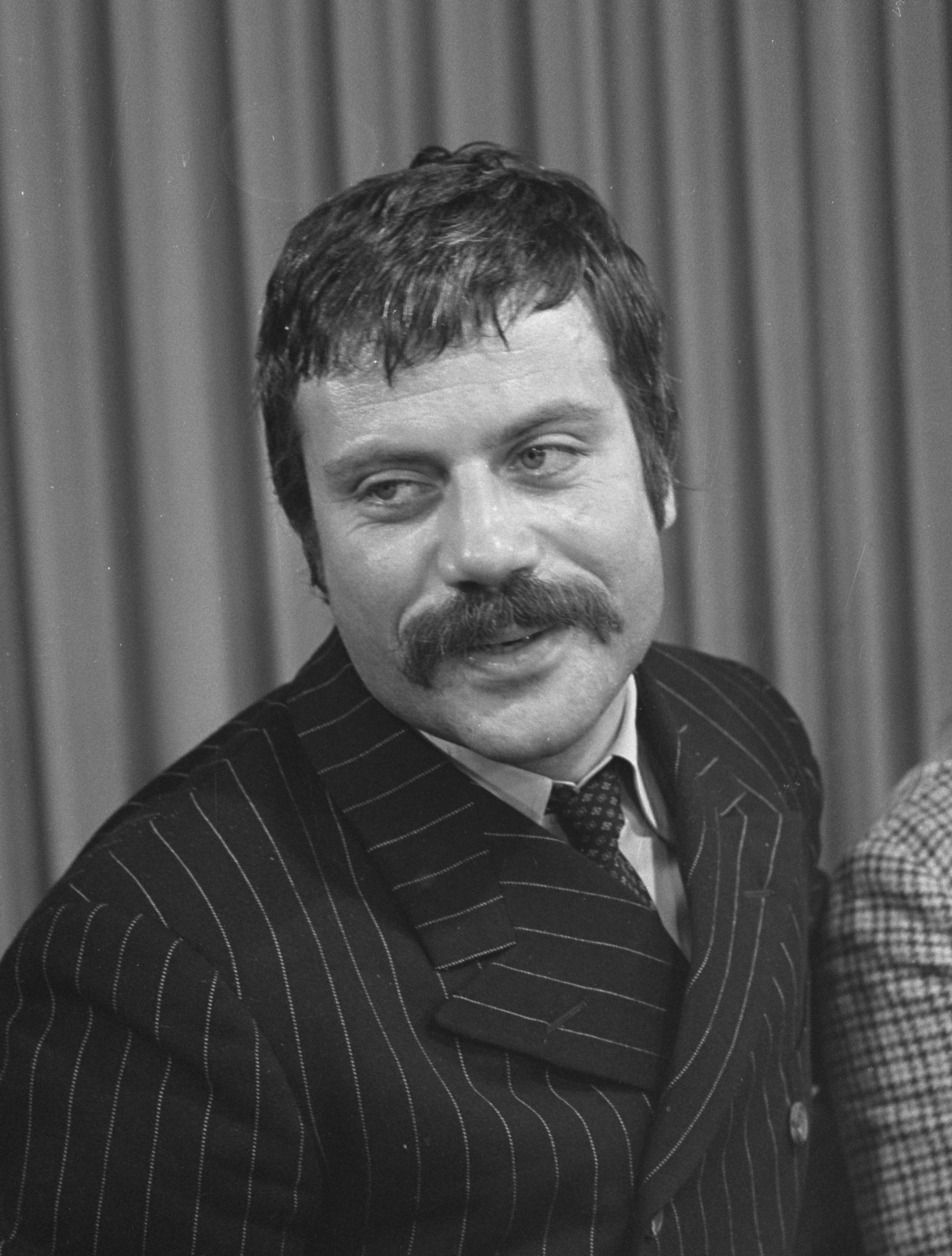
- Reed in 1968
- Born: Robert Oliver Reed; 13 February 1938; Wimbledon, Surrey, England
- Died: 2 May 1999 (aged 61); Valletta, Malta
- Burial place: Bruhenny Graveyard, Churchtown, County Cork, Ireland
- Education: Ewell Castle School
- Occupation: Actor
- Years active: 1955–1999
- Notable work: Full list
- Spouses: Kate Byrne (m. 1960; div. 1969) Josephine Burge (m. 1985)
- Children: 2
- Relatives: Simon Reed (half-brother); Herbert Beerbohm Tree (grandfather); Carol Reed (uncle); Viola Tree (aunt); Felicity Tree (aunt); Iris Tree (aunt); Julius Beerbohm (great-uncle); Max Beerbohm (great-uncle); Constance Beerbohm (great-aunt)

Robert Oliver Reed (13 February 1938 – 2 May 1999) was an English actor, known for his macho, upper-middle class image and his heavy-drinking, "hellraiser" lifestyle. His screen career spanned over 40 years, between 1955 and 1999. At the peak of his career, in 1971, British exhibitors voted Reed fifth-most-popular star at the box office.

After making his first significant screen appearances in Hammer Horror films in the early 1960s, his notable film roles included La Bete in The Trap (1966), Bill Sikes in Oliver! (a film directed by his uncle Carol Reed that won the 1968 Academy Award for Best Picture), Gerald Crich in Women in Love (1969), Stephen 'Hannibal' Brooks in Hannibal Brooks (1969), Father Urbain Grandier in The Devils (1971), Athos in The Three Musketeers (1973) and The Four Musketeers (1974), "Uncle" Frank Hobbs in Tommy (1975), Ben Rolf in Burnt Offerings (1976), Dr. Hal Raglan in The Brood (1979), Dolly Hopkins in Funny Bones (1995), and Antonius Proximo in Gladiator (2000).

For playing the old, gruff gladiator trainer in Ridley Scott's Gladiator, in what was his final film, Reed was posthumously nominated for the BAFTA Award for Best Actor in a Supporting Role in 2000.

The British Film Institute (BFI) stated that "partnerships with Michael Winner and Ken Russell in the mid-[19]60s saw Reed become an emblematic Brit-flick icon", but from the mid-1970s his alcoholism began affecting his career, with the BFI adding: "Reed had assumed Robert Newton's mantle as Britain's thirstiest thespian".

== Early life and education ==
Robert Oliver Reed was born on 13 February 1938 at 9 Durrington Park Road, Wimbledon (now part of southwest London) to Peter Reed, a sports journalist, and Marcia (née Napier-Andrews). He was the nephew of film director Sir Carol Reed, and grandson of the actor-manager Sir Herbert Beerbohm Tree and his mistress, Beatrice May Pinney (who later assumed the name 'Reed'), she being "the only person who understood, listened to, encouraged and kissed Oliver". Reed claimed to have been a descendant (through an illegitimate step) of Peter the Great, Tsar of Russia. Reed attended 14 schools, including Ewell Castle School in Surrey. "My father thought I was just lazy," Reed later said. "He thought I was a dunce."

Reed claimed he had worked as a boxer, a bouncer, a taxi driver and a hospital porter. He then did his conscription in the Royal Army Medical Corps (RAMC). "The army helped," he said later. "I recognized that most other people were actors as well. I was in the peacetime army and they were all telling us youngsters about the war."

== Career ==
=== Early years (1955–1961) ===
Reed began his acting career as an extra in films. He appeared uncredited in Ken Annakin's film Value for Money (1955) and Norman Wisdom's film The Square Peg (1958). Uncredited television appearances included episodes of The Invisible Man (1958), The Four Just Men (1959) and The Third Man. He appeared in the documentary Hello London (1958).

Reed's first break was playing Richard of Gloucester in a six-part BBC TV series The Golden Spur (1959). It did not seem to help his career immediately: He was not credited in the films The Captain's Table (1959), Upstairs and Downstairs (1959), directed by Ralph Thomas, Life Is a Circus (1960), The Angry Silence (1960), The League of Gentlemen (1960) or Beat Girl (1960). He played a bouncer in The Two Faces of Dr. Jekyll (1960) for Hammer Films with which he would become associated; the director was Terence Fisher. Reed was then in The Bulldog Breed (1960), another Wisdom film, playing the leader of a gang of Teddy Boys roughing up Wisdom in a cinema.

Reed got his first significant role in Hammer Films' Sword of Sherwood Forest (1960), again directed by Fisher. He went back to small roles for His and Hers (1961), a Terry-Thomas comedy; No Love for Johnnie (1961) for Ralph Thomas; and The Rebel (1961) with Tony Hancock. He played the role of Sebastian in the ITV series It's Dark Outside, which was popular with teenagers, making him an idol for the first time.

=== Leading man ===
Reed's first starring role came when Hammer cast him as the central character in Terence Fisher's The Curse of the Werewolf (1961). Hammer liked Reed and gave him good supporting roles in the swashbuckler The Pirates of Blood River (1962), directed by John Gilling; Captain Clegg (1962), a smugglers tale with Peter Cushing; The Damned (1963), a science fiction film directed by Joseph Losey; Paranoiac (1963), a psycho thriller for director Freddie Francis; and The Scarlet Blade (1963); a swashbuckler set during the English Civil War, directed by Gilling, with Reed as a Roundhead.

During this time, he appeared in some ITV Playhouse productions, "Murder in Shorthand" (1962) and "The Second Chef" (1962), and guest-starred in episodes of The Saint. He also had the lead in a non-Hammer horror, The Party's Over (made 1963, released 1965), directed by Guy Hamilton.

=== Michael Winner and Ken Russell ===
In 1964, he starred in the first of six films directed by Michael Winner, The System (known as The Girl-Getters in the US). The film was seen by Ken Russell who then cast Reed in the title role of The Debussy Film (1965), a TV biopic of French composer Claude Debussy. Reed said this was crucial to his career because "That was the first time I met Ken Russell and it was the first part I had after I'd had my face cut in a fight and no one would employ me. Everybody thought I was a cripple." It was also the first time he broke away from villainous roles. "Until that time they thought I was a neolithic dustbin," said Reed. Reed later said "Hammer films had given me my start and Michael Winner my bread then Ken Russell came on the screen and gave me my art."

He narrated Russell's TV movie Always on Sunday (1965). Reed returned to Hammer for The Brigand of Kandahar (1965), playing a villainous Indian in an imperial action film for Gilling. He later called it the worst film he ever made for Hammer. He guest-starred in episodes of It's Dark Outside and Court Martial, the latter directed by Seth Holt. He had a regular role in the TV series R3 (1965). Reed was the lead in a Canadian-British co-production, The Trap (1966), co-starring with Rita Tushingham, where his voice was dubbed.

Reed's career stepped up another level when he starred in the popular comedy film The Jokers (1966), his second film with Winner, alongside Michael Crawford. After playing a villain in a horror movie, The Shuttered Room (1967), he did a third with Winner, I'll Never Forget What's'isname (1967), co-starring with Orson Welles. Reed was reunited with Russell for another TV movie, Dante's Inferno (1967), playing Dante Gabriel Rossetti.

=== Oliver! and stardom ===
Richard Burton, Richard Harris, Oliver Reed and Peter O'Toole were among the four greatest actors of their generation. Onstage, they brought new vigour to Shakespeare and Shaw. Onscreen, they made British cinema sexy in classic films including Lawrence of Arabia, Oliver!, Becket and This Sporting Life.

— Four Hellraisers, Living It Up In The Public Eye. NPR, 27 March 2010.

Reed's star rose further as a result of playing Bill Sikes in Oliver! (1968), alongside Ron Moody, Shani Wallis, Mark Lester, Jack Wild and Harry Secombe, in his uncle Carol Reed's screen version of the successful stage musical. It was a huge hit, winning the Academy Award for Best Picture, with Reed receiving praise for his villainous performance.

He was in the black comedy The Assassination Bureau (1969) with Diana Rigg and Telly Savalas, directed by Basil Dearden; and a war film for Winner, Hannibal Brooks (1969).

More successful than either was his fourth film with Russell, a film version of Women in Love (1969), in which he wrestled naked with Alan Bates in front of a log fire. In 1969, Interstate Theatres awarded him their International Star of the Year Award.

Take a Girl Like You (1970) was a sex comedy with Hayley Mills based on a novel by Kingsley Amis; The Lady in the Car with Glasses and a Gun (1970) was a thriller directed by Anatole Litvak. The following year, Reed appeared with Vanessa Redgrave in the controversial film The Devils (1971), directed by Russell.

An anecdote holds that Reed could have been chosen to play James Bond. In 1969, Bond franchise producers Albert R. Broccoli and Harry Saltzman were looking for a replacement for Sean Connery and Reed (who had recently played a resourceful killer in The Assassination Bureau) was mentioned as a possible choice for the role, with Timothy Dalton and Roger Moore as the other choices. Whatever the reason, Reed was never to play Bond. After Reed's death, the Guardian Unlimited called the casting decision, "One of the great missed opportunities of post-war British movie history."

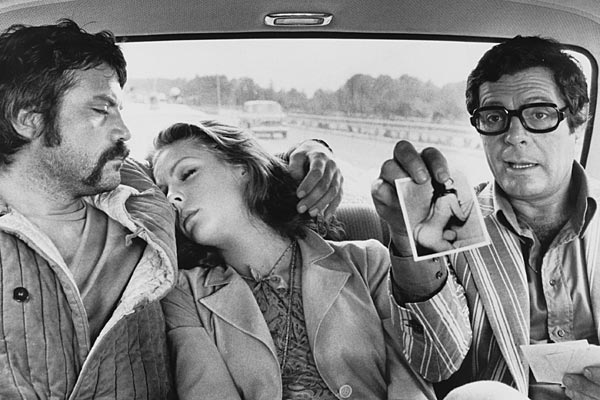
Reed (left) with Carole André and Marcello Mastroianni in Dirty Weekend (1973)

He made a series of action-oriented projects: The Hunting Party (1971), a Western shot in Spain with Gene Hackman; Sitting Target (1972), a tough gangster film; and Z.P.G. (1972), a science fiction film with Geraldine Chaplin. In March 1971, he said he would make a film, The Offering, which he would co-write and produce, but it was not made. He did The Triple Echo (1972) directed by Michael Apted, and featured Reed alongside Glenda Jackson. Reed also appeared in a number of Italian films: Dirty Weekend (1973), with Marcello Mastroianni; One Russian Summer (1973) with Claudia Cardinale; and Revolver (1973) with Fabio Testi.

He had great success playing Athos in The Three Musketeers (1973) and The Four Musketeers (1974) for director Richard Lester from a script by George MacDonald Fraser. Reed had an uncredited bit-part in Russell's Mahler (1974), was the lead in Blue Blood (1973) and And Then There Were None (1974), produced by Harry Alan Towers. His next project with Ken Russell was Tommy, where he plays Tommy's stepfather, based on The Who's 1969 concept album, Tommy, and starring its lead singer Roger Daltrey. Royal Flash (1975) reunited him with Richard Lester and George MacDonald Fraser, playing Otto von Bismarck. He had a cameo in Russell's Lisztomania (1975).

Reed appeared in The New Spartans (1975), then acted alongside Karen Black, Bette Davis, and Burgess Meredith in the Dan Curtis horror film, Burnt Offerings (1976). He was in The Sell Out (1976) and The Great Scout & Cathouse Thursday (1976) with Lee Marvin. After Assault in Paradise (1977), he returned to swashbuckling in Crossed Swords (UK title The Prince and the Pauper) (1977), as Miles Hendon alongside Raquel Welch and a grown-up Mark Lester, who had worked with Reed in Oliver!, from a script co-written by Fraser.

Reed did Tomorrow Never Comes (1978) for Peter Colinson and The Big Sleep (1978) with Winner. He and Jackson were reunited in The Class of Miss MacMichael (1978), then he made a film in Canada, The Mad Trapper, that was unfinished. Reed returned to the horror genre as Dr. Hal Raglan in David Cronenberg's 1979 film The Brood and ended the decade with A Touch of the Sun (1979), a comedy with Peter Cushing.

=== 1980s ===
After the 1970s, Reed's films had less success. He did a comedy for Charles B. Griffith, Dr. Heckyl and Mr. Hype (1980) and played Gen. Rodolfo Graziani in Lion of the Desert (1981), which co-starred Anthony Quinn and chronicled the Senussids resistance to Italian occupation of Libya. On 20 January 2016, ISIS used a clip of Lion of the Desert as part of a propaganda video threatening Italy with terrorist attacks.

Reed was a villain in Disney's Condorman (1981) and did the horror film Venom (1981). He was a villain in The Sting II (1983) and appeared in Sex, Lies and Renaissance (1983). He also starred as Lt-Col Gerard Leachman in the Iraqi historical film Clash of Loyalties (1983), which dealt with Leachman's exploits during the 1920 revolution in Mesopotamia (modern-day Iraq). Reed was in Spasms (1983), Two of a Kind (1983), Masquerade (1984), Christopher Columbus (1985), Black Arrow (1985) and Captive (1986). He says he was contemplating quitting acting when Nicolas Roeg cast him in Castaway (1986) as the middle-aged Gerald Kingsland, who advertises for a "wife" (played by Amanda Donohoe) to live on a desert island with him for a year.

Reed was the subject of This Is Your Life in 1986 when he was surprised by Eamonn Andrews at Rosslyn Park rugby club in west London. Reed was in The Misfit Brigade (1987), Gor (1987), Master of Dragonard Hill (1987), Dragonard (1987), Skeleton Coast (1988), Blind Justice (1988), Captive Rage (1988), and Rage to Kill (1988). Most of these were exploitation films produced by the impresario Harry Alan Towers filmed in South Africa and released straight to video.

He was in Terry Gilliam's The Adventures of Baron Munchausen (1988) (as the god Vulcan); The Lady and the Highwayman (1989) with Hugh Grant; The House of Usher (1989); The Return of the Musketeers (1990) with Lester and Fraser; Treasure Island (1990) with Charlton Heston; A Ghost in Monte Carlo (1990); Hired to Kill (1990); Panama Sugar (1990); The Revenger (1990); The Pit and the Pendulum (1991); Prisoner of Honor (1991) for Russell; and Severed Ties (1992).

=== Later years ===
Later films and TV series Reed appeared in include Return to Lonesome Dove (1993); Funny Bones (1995); The Bruce (1996); Jeremiah (1998); and Parting Shots (1998). His final role was the elderly slave dealer Proximo in Ridley Scott's Gladiator (2000), in which he played alongside Richard Harris, an actor whom Reed admired greatly both on and off the screen. The film was released after his death with some footage filmed with a double, digitally mixed with outtake footage. The film was dedicated to him. In addition to his posthumous BAFTA recognition, he shared the film's nomination for the Actor Award for Outstanding Performance by a Cast in a Motion Picture with the rest of the principal players.

=== Music ===
In addition to acting, Reed released several singles in the popular music vein, though with limited success. These included "Wild One"/"Lonely for a Girl" (1961), "Sometimes"/"Ecstasy" (1962), "Baby It's Cold Outside" (duet with Joyce Blair) and "Wild Thing" (1992) (duet with snooker player Alex Higgins). Reed also later narrated a track called "Walpurgis Nacht" by the Italian heavy metal band Death SS.

== Personal life ==
In 1960, Reed married Kate Byrne. The couple had one son before their divorce in 1969. While filming his part of Bill Sikes in Oliver! (1968), he met Jacquie Daryl, a classically trained dancer who was also in the film. They became lovers and subsequently had a daughter. In 1985, he married Josephine Burge, to whom he remained married until his death. When they met in 1980, she was 16 years old and he was 42. In his final years, Reed and Burge lived in Churchtown, County Cork, Ireland.

In December 1974, Reed appeared on BBC Radio 4's Desert Island Discs, a show where the guest, a "castaway", talks about their life and chooses eight favourite songs and the reasons for their choices. He named "Jardins sous la pluie" by French composer Claude Debussy as his favourite piece of music, and when asked what book and inanimate luxury item he would take with him on a desert island Reed chose Winnie-the-Pooh by A. A. Milne and an inflatable rubber woman.

On 26 September 1975, while Reed was interviewed by Johnny Carson on The Tonight Show, Shelley Winters, angered by derogatory comments Reed had made about feminists and women's liberation, poured a cup of whiskey over his head on-camera.

=== Activities ===
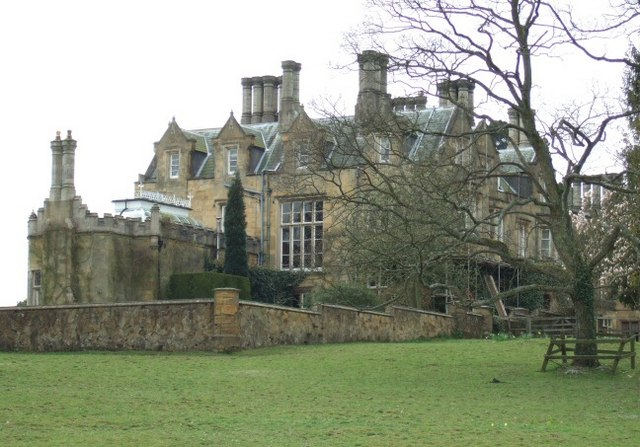
Broome Hall, Surrey, Reed's home for eight years from 1971

In 1964, Reed was in the Crazy Elephant nightclub in Leicester Square and got into a dispute at the bar with a couple of men that ended with Reed walking away with a dismissive remark. They waited until he went to the toilet, followed him in and attacked him with broken bottles. He received 63 stitches in one side of his face, was left with permanent scarring, and initially thought his film career was over. According to his brother, subsequent to the attack, when arguing, the burly Reed would bring his hands up in a gesture that was defensive but many men found very intimidating.

In 1993, Reed was unsuccessfully sued by his former stuntman, stand-in, and friend Reg Prince for an alleged spinal injury incurred by the latter while on location for the filming of Castaway.

He claimed to have turned down a major role in the Hollywood movie The Sting (although he did appear in the 1983 sequel The Sting II). When the 1970s UK government raised taxes on personal income, Reed initially declined to join the exodus of major British film stars to Hollywood and other more tax-friendly locales. In the late 1970s, Reed relocated to Guernsey as a tax exile. He had sold his large house, Broome Hall, between the Surrey villages of Coldharbour and Ockley, and initially lodged at the Duke of Normandie Hotel in Saint Peter Port.

Reed often described himself as a British patriot and preferred to live in the United Kingdom over relocating to Hollywood. He supported British military efforts during the Falklands War. According to Robert Sellers, Reed tried reenlisting, at age 44, in the British Army following the outbreak of the conflict but was turned down.

In 2013, the writer Robert Sellers published What Fresh Lunacy Is This? – The Authorised Biography of Oliver Reed.

=== Alcoholism ===
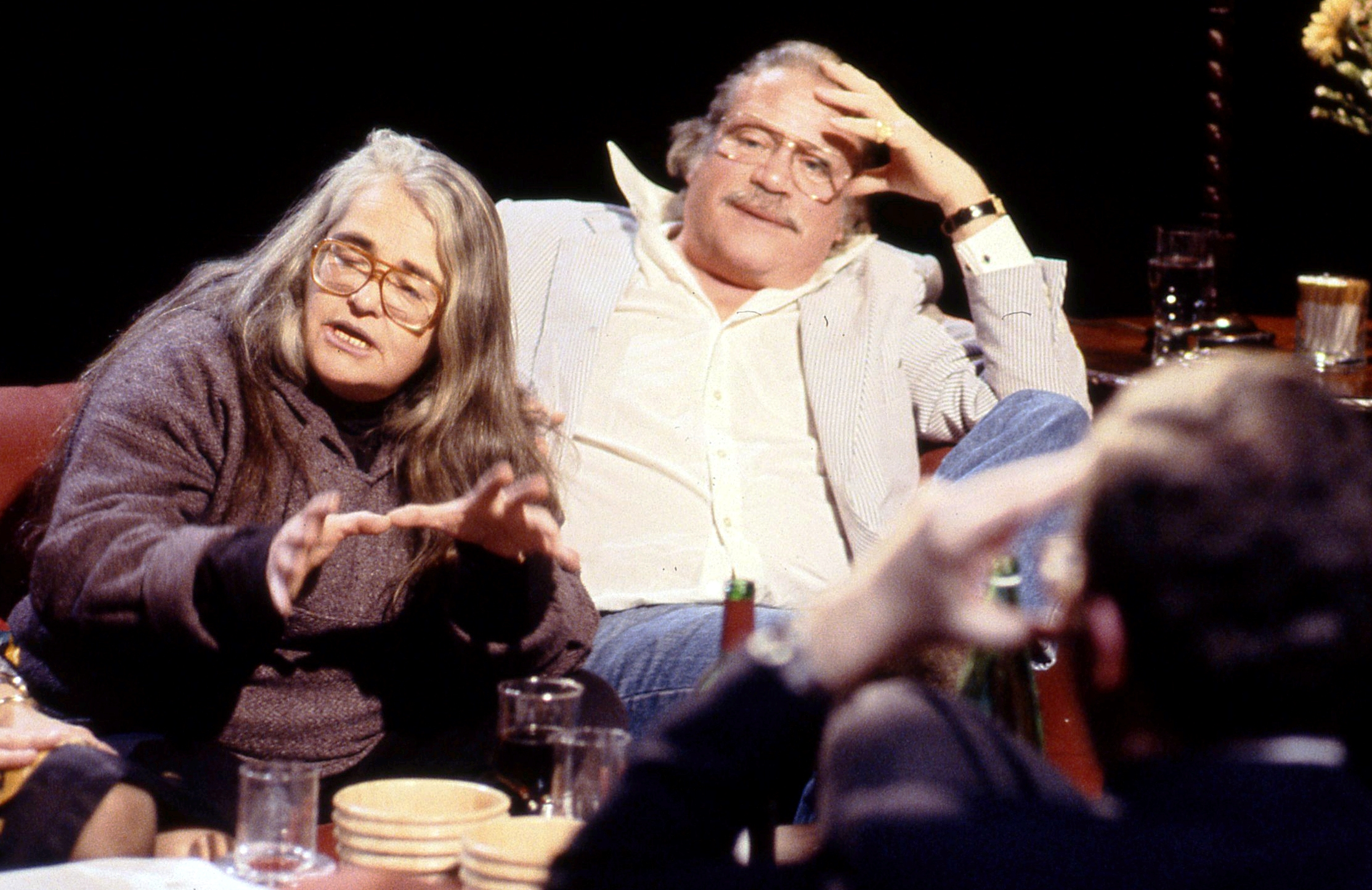
Appearing with Kate Millett on the After Dark programme "Do Men Have To Be Violent?" in 1991

Reed was known for his alcoholism and binge drinking. Numerous anecdotes exist, such as Reed and 36 friends drinking, in one evening: 60 gallons of beer, 32 bottles of scotch, 17 bottles of gin, four crates of wine, and a bottle of Babycham. Reed subsequently revised the story, claiming he drank 106 pints of beer on a two-day binge before marrying Josephine Burge: "The event that was reported actually took place during an arm-wrestling competition in Guernsey, about 15 years ago; it was highly exaggerated." In the late 1970s, Steve McQueen told the story that, in 1973, he flew to the UK to discuss a film project with Reed, who suggested that the two of them visit a London nightclub. They ended up on a marathon pub crawl throughout the night, during which Reed got so drunk that he vomited on McQueen.

Reed became a close friend and drinking partner of the Who's drummer Keith Moon in 1974, while working together on the film version of Tommy. With their reckless lifestyles, Reed and Moon had much in common, and both cited the hard-drinking actor Robert Newton as a role model. Sir Christopher Lee, a friend and colleague of Reed, commented on his alcoholism in 2014, saying "when he started, after [drink] number eight, he became a complete monster. It was awful to see."

In 1982, Reed was held partly responsible for the demise of BBC1's live talk show Sin on Saturday after some typically forthright comments on the subject of lust, featured on the first programme. The series had many other issues, and a fellow guest revealed that Reed recognised this when he arrived, and virtually had to be dragged in front of the cameras. Near the end of his life, he was brought onto some television series specifically for his drinking; for example, The Word put bottles of vodka in his dressing room so he could be secretly filmed getting drunk. According to Reed the whole thing was a stunt ("I knew all about the 'secret' camera, and the vodka was water"), and that he was paid to "act drunk". On 26 January 1991 Reed left the set of the Channel 4 live-television discussion programme After Dark after arriving drunk and attempting to aggressively kiss feminist writer Kate Millett.

Evil Spirits, a biography of Reed that was written by Cliff Goodwin, offered the theory that Reed was not always as drunk on chat shows as he appeared to be, but rather was acting the part of an uncontrollably sodden former star to liven things up, at the producers' behests. In October 1981, Reed was arrested in Vermont, where he was tried and acquitted of disturbing the peace while drunk. He pleaded no contest to two assault charges and was fined $1,200. In December 1987, Reed, who was overweight and already suffered from gout, became seriously ill with kidney problems as a result of his alcoholism, and had to abstain from drinking for over a year, on the advice of his doctor.

During the filming of Renny Harlin's Cutthroat Island (1995), he was cast in a cameo role as Mordechai Fingers. Due to his arriving extremely intoxicated, having already been in trouble for a bar fight, before attempting to "expose himself" to lead actress Geena Davis, he was fired and replaced with British character actor George Murcell.

In his final years, when he lived in Ireland, Reed was a regular in the one-roomed O'Brien's Bar in Churchtown, County Cork, close to the 13th-century cemetery in the heart of the village where he would be buried.

== Death ==
During a break from filming Gladiator in Valletta on the afternoon of 2 May 1999, Reed died from a sudden heart attack at the age of 61. According to Gladiator screenwriter David Franzoni, Reed had encountered a group of Royal Navy sailors from HMS Cumberland who were on shore leave at a bar and challenged them to a drinking match. He fell ill during the match and collapsed, dying in the ambulance en route to the hospital despite resuscitation efforts by his friends.

A funeral for Reed was held in the Irish village of Churchtown, where he had lived during the last years of his life. His body was interred in the village's Bruhenny Graveyard, a short distance from the pub he would frequent. The epitaph on his gravestone reads, "He made the air move."

In 2016, Reed's Gladiator co-star Omid Djalili said of his death, "[Reed] hadn't had a drink for months before filming started... everyone said he went the way he wanted, but that's not true. It was very tragic. He was in an English bar and was pressured into a drinking competition. He should have just left, but he didn't." Reed had promised Gladiator director Ridley Scott prior to filming, that he would not drink during production, which he worked around by only drinking on weekends when filming was not under way. Another Gladiator co-star, David Hemmings, was a long-time friend of Reed; Scott stated in 2020, "[David] promised to look after him and said to me [upon his death] 'I'm really sorry, old boy'."

=== Aftermath ===
As a result of his death, Reed's remaining scenes in Gladiator had to be completed using a body double and computer-generated imagery (CGI) techniques. Despite this, he was posthumously nominated for the BAFTA Award for Best Supporting Actor.

== Books ==
- Reed, Oliver (1981). Reed All About Me. Sevenoaks, Kent, UK: Coronet Books. ISBN 9780340260142. OCLC 1052806394.

== See also ==
- List of British actors
- List of deaths through alcohol
