= Severed Ties (film) =

- Directed by: Damon Santostefano
- Starring: Oliver Reed; Elke Sommer
- Production company: Fangoria Films
- Distributed by: Columbia TriStar Home Video
- Release date: November 1, 1992
- Running time: 92 minutes
- Country: United States
- Language: English

Severed Ties is a 1992 comedy horror film directed by Damon Santostefano. It was released to video by Columbia TriStar Home Video.

== Premise ==
A regeneration experiment on a severed arm goes awry, turning the limb into a murderous, reptilian creature.

== Cast ==
- Oliver Reed - Doctor Hans Vaughan
- Elke Sommer - Helena Harrison
- Garrett Morris - Stripes
- Billy Morrissette - Harrison Harrison
- Johnny Legend - Preacher
- Roger Perkovich - Lorenz
- Denise Wallace - Eve
- Bekki Vallin - Uta
