= Terence Ryan (director) =

Terence Ryan is a British film director, writer, and producer.

He has written, directed and produced eight feature films and he has also produced and directed an enormous variety of television programs and television series ranging from serious drama and comedy to sport, music and documentary.

Feature films directed and produced by him include The Brylcreem Boys, Puckoon, Going Home, Hold My Hand I'm Dying. Feature films produced by Terence Ryan include Botched, Heaven on Earth.

His work includes films in the genres of drama, comedy, music, and sport. He has also produced and directed social documentaries for charities including Help the Aged, Who Matters, Children in Need and Immunization Awareness.

Ryan is a founding member of the Irish Academy of Film.

== Early life ==
He was born in London, England.

== Career ==
Ryan began his film career in 1972 at the London International Film School. His first short feature, dramatising the life of the poet Gerard Manley Hopkins, was awarded the Finbar Prize for the Best Film at the Cork Film Festival. This film also won Terence Ryan the Grierson Award at the 1972 UK BAFTA Awards.

In 1980, Ryan formed Opix Films with partner Ray Marshall. The company produced 120 films and television series over a twelve-year period. Thirty films made at Opix, produced and directed by Ryan won international awards.

In 1982, Ryan produced and directed the sports series Focus on Soccer with sporting greats including Kevin Keegan, Ray Clemence and Graham Hill. He also produced and directed two further sports series for Sky Television, Focus on Rugby and Superstars of Soccer.

From 1982 to 1987, Ryan wrote, produced and directed seven comedy television features in association with both the BBC and ITV starring British comedians Jasper Carrott, Billy Connolly and Max Boyce.

In 1988, Ryan produced and directed the award-winning World War I feature film, Going Home, a co-production with Canada's Paterson Ferns at Primedia Films and the Canadian Broadcasting Corporation. Going Home was nominated in Canada Gemini Awards in the categories Best Director and best film. He was awarded the gold medal at the Huston Film Festival for Going Home.

In 1989, he Ryan directed the feature film adaptation of the John Gordon-Davis novel Hold My Hand I'm Dying, the story of the building of the Kariba Dam between Zimbabwe and Zambia, starring Oliver Reed.

In 1997, Ryan produced and directed the romantic adventure feature The Brylcreem Boys, set in 1940s Ireland. Starring Gabriel Byrne and Bill Campbell, this film has become one of the most broadcast film on American Television.

In 1999, the Welsh Arts Council honoured Ryan for his work in film.

In 2000, Terence Ryan produced and directed the feature comedy Puckoon, adapted from the best selling novel by Spike Milligan, with a cast including Richard Attenborough, Elliott Gould, Milo O'Shea, Daragh O'Malley, David Kelly and John Kavanagh.

In 2006, Terence Ryan produced the film Botched (a.k.a. 13), filmed in Ireland at Ardmore Studios, Dublin.

2008 saw the publication of The Rise and Rise of the Independents, written by Ian Potter, published by Guerilla Publishing, Nov. 2008. This book details Terence Ryan's career as one of the major Independent Film Producers in the UK and Ireland.
