= H2S (film) =

- Poster
- Directed by: Roberto Faenza
- Screenplay by: Roberto Faenza
- Starring: Denis Gilmore, Carole André
- Music by: Ennio Morricone
- Release date: September 5, 1969
- Running time: 88 minutes
- Country: Italy
- Language: Italian

H2S is a 1969 Italian dystopian-science-fiction film directed by Roberto Faenza. Although filmed in 1968 and officially released in 1969, the film was immediately banned in Italy, to be distributed only in 1971. Set in the near future, it portrays a student revolt in a dictatorship.

== Cast ==
- Lionel Stander as the Professor
- Denis Gilmore as Tommaso
- Carole André as Alice
- Giancarlo Cobelli as the Chief
- Paolo Poli as the Centenary Woman

== Production ==
The film is Faenza's second feature; H2S was filmed in 1969. His next film, Forza Italia!, would only be released in 1977.

== Reception ==
Due to repeated censorship issues, the film was only distributed in 1971, attracting little attention at the time.

Reviewing H2S during its March 1973 run at the Ritz d'Essai in Turin, La Stampa described the film as an allegorical indictment of technocracy as a means of exercising power. The reviewer found the film thoughtful and often perceptive, and suggested that delays in censorship and cinema booking may have diminished its visual freshness.
