= Dirty Weekend (1973 film) =

1973 film

- Film poster
- Directed by: Dino Risi
- Screenplay by: Ruggero Maccari; Dino Risi; Bernardino Zapponi
- Story by: Ruggero Maccari; Dino Risi; Bernardino Zapponi
- Produced by: Carlo Ponti
- Starring: Marcello Mastroianni; Oliver Reed; Carole André; Nicoletta Machiavelli
- Cinematography: Luciano Tovoli
- Edited by: Alberto Gallitti
- Music by: Carlo Rustichelli
- Production companies: Compagnia Cinematografica Champion; Les Films Concordia
- Distributed by: Metro-Goldwyn-Mayer
- Release dates: 8 March 1973 (Italy); 2 October 1974 (Paris)
- Running time: 113 minutes
- Countries: Italy; France
- Budget: $1.4 million
- Box office: Italian lira 303.187 million

Dirty Weekend (Italian: Mordi e fuggi) is a 1973 Italian comedy film directed by Dino Risi. Described by Roberto Curti as a road movie and crime film, Dirty Weekend addresses the topic of terrorism and violence.

== Cast ==
- Marcello Mastroianni as Giulio Borsi
- Oliver Reed as Fabrizo
- Carole André as Danda
- Lionel Stander as General
- Bruno Cirino as Raoul
- Nicoletta Machiavelli as Sylva
- Gianni Agus as Sergio
- Marcello Mandò as Police Commissioner Spallone
- Renzo Marignano as Franco
- Barbara Pilavin as Norma

== Release ==
Dirty Weekend was released theatrically in Italy where it was distributed by Cineriz. The film grossed a total of 303.187 million Italian lira on its release. The film was later shown in Paris on 2 October 1974 under the title Rapt a l'italienne with a 100-minute running time.
