= One Russian Summer =

- Directed by: Antonio Calenda
- Screenplay by: Edward Bond; Antonio Calenda; Ugo Pirro
- Based on: Vadim by Mikhail Lermontov
- Starring: Oliver Reed; Claudia Cardinale; John McEnery
- Cinematography: Alfio Contini
- Music by: Riz Ortolani
- Release date: 1973
- Country: Italy
- Language: English
- Budget: $1.6 million

One Russian Summer (Italian: Il giorno del furore, UK title: Fury) is a 1973 Italian film based on Lermontov's juvenile novel. It stars Oliver Reed and Claudia Cardinale.

== Plot ==
Palizyn is the patriarch of an aristocratic family in pre-revolutionary Russia. Ruthless and savage, he exercises great power over his dependents, his peers, and his army of servants. Vadim, outwardly the most wretched and obedient of the servants, secretly arranges for them to revolt.

== Cast ==
- Oliver Reed as Palizyn
- John McEnery as Vadim
- Carole André as Irene
- Ray Lovelock as Yuri
- Claudia Cardinale as Anya
- Zora Velcova as Natalya
- Paola Tedesco as Yulya
