= List of Italian films of 1983 =

A list of films produced in Italy in 1983 (see 1983 in film):

Title	Director	Cast	Genre	Notes
1983
2019, After the Fall of New York	Sergio Martino	Michael Sopkiw, George Eastman	Action, science fiction	Italian-French co-production
Acapulco, prima spiaggia... a sinistra	Sergio Martino	Gigi e Andrea, Serena Grandi	Comedy	
Acqua e sapone	Carlo Verdone	Carlo Verdone, Natasha Hovey, Florinda Bolkan	romantic comedy	
Al bar dello sport	Francesco Massaro	Lino Banfi, Jerry Calà, Mara Venier	comedy	
And the Ship Sails On	Federico Fellini	Freddie Jones, Barbara Jefford, Peter Cellier	Comedy	Italian-French co-production
The Ark of the Sun God	Antonio Margheriti	David Warbeck, John Steiner	action-adventure	
Ars amandi	Walerian Borowczyk	Marina Pierro, Michele Placido, Massimo Girotti	erotic-fantasy	
The Atlantis Interceptors	Ruggero Deodato	Christopher Connelly	Science fiction	Italian-Filipino co-production
Le Bal	Ettore Scola	Étienne Guichard, Francesco de Rosa, Arnault Lecarpentier	Musical	French-Italian-Algerian co-production
Basileus Quartet	Fabio Carpi	Héctor Alterio, Omero Antonutti, Mimsy Farmer	drama	
Benvenuta	André Delvaux	Vittorio Gassman, Fanny Ardant, Françoise Fabian	drama	
Bingo Bongo	Pasquale Festa Campanile	Adriano Celentano, Carole Bouquet	Family comedy	
A Blade in the Dark	Lamberto Bava	Andrea Occhipinti, Michele Soavi, Anna Papa	Horror	
Bonnie and Clyde Italian Style	Steno	Paolo Villaggio, Ornella Muti	comedy	
A Boy and a Girl	Marco Risi	Jerry Calà, Marina Suma	romantic comedy	
Cat and Dog	Bruno Corbucci	Bud Spencer, Tomas Milian	crime-comedy	
Conquest	Lucio Fulci	Jorge Rivero, Andrea Occhipinti	Fantasy	Italian-Spanish-Mexican co-production
Copkiller	Roberto Faenza	Harvey Keitel, John Lydon	crime-thriller	
Dagger Eyes	Carlo Vanzina	Carole Bouquet, Duilio Del Prete	thriller	
Delitto carnale	Cesare Canevari	Marc Porel, Moana Pozzi	Giallo	
Il disertore	Giuliana Berlinguer	Irene Papas, Omero Antonutti	drama	
Dolce e selvaggio	Antonio Climati, Mario Morra	-	Mondo film	
Emanuelle Escapes from Hell	Bruno Mattei	Laura Gemser, Gabriele Tinti	women in prison	
Endgame (Bronx lotta finale)	Joe D'Amato	Al Cliver, Laura Gemser, George Eastman	post-apocalyptic	
Escape from the Bronx	Enzo G. Castellari	Mark Gregory, Henry Silva	post-apocalyptic	
Exterminators of the Year 3000	Giuliano Carmineo	Robert Iannucci, Alicia Moro, Eduardo Fajardo	Action, science fiction	
Fantozzi subisce ancora	Neri Parenti	Paolo Villaggio, Milena Vukotic	comedy	
"FF.SS." – Cioè: "...che mi hai portato a fare sopra a Posillipo se non mi vuoi più bene?"	Renzo Arbore	Renzo Arbore, Pietra Montecorvino, Roberto Benigni, Gigi Proietti	comedy	
Flirt	Roberto Russo	Monica Vitti, Jean-Luc Bideau	romance-drama	Entered into the 34th Berlin International Film Festival
The General of the Dead Army	Luciano Tovoli	Marcello Mastroianni, Anouk Aimée, Michel Piccoli	drama	
Go for It	Enzo Barboni	Terence Hill, Bud Spencer	Action, comedy	
Hearts and Armour	Giacomo Battiato	Rick Edwards, Zeudi Araya, Ronn Moss	Historical adventure	
Hercules	Luigi Cozzi	Lou Ferrigno, Sybil Danning, Rossana Podestà	Adventure, fantasy	
The House of the Yellow Carpet	Carlo Lizzani	Erland Josephson, Béatrice Romand, Vittorio Mezzogiorno	Giallo	
Io con te non ci sto più	Gianni Amico	Monica Guerritore, Victor Cavallo	romance	
Ironmaster	Umberto Lenzi	Sam Pasco, George_Eastman_(actor), Elvire Audrey		Italian-French co-production
A Joke of Destiny	Lina Wertmüller	Ugo Tognazzi, Piera Degli Esposti, Gastone Moschin	comedy	Entered into the 14th Moscow International Film Festival
The Key	Tinto Brass	Stefania Sandrelli, Frank Finlay, Franco Branciaroli	Adult	
Tornado: The Last Blood	Antonio Margheriti	Giancarlo Prete	war	
Lontano da dove	Stefania Casini, Francesca Marciano	Claudio Amendola, Stefania Casini, Victor Cavallo, Monica Scattini	romantic drama	
Mani di fata	Steno	Renato Pozzetto, Eleonora Giorgi, Sylva Koscina	comedy	
The Moon in the Gutter	Jean-Jacques Beineix	Gérard Depardieu, Nastassja Kinski, Victoria Abril	Drama, mystery	French-Italian co-production
The New Barbarians	Enzo G. Castellari	Giancarlo Prete, Fred Williamson, George Eastman	Adventure, science fiction	
Nostalghia	Andrei Tarkovsky	Oleg Yankovsky, Erland Josephson, Domiziana Giordano	Drama	Italian-Soviet Union co-production
Occhio, malocchio, prezzemolo e finocchio	Sergio Martino	Johnny Dorelli, Lino Banfi, Janet Agren	comedy	
Pappa e ciccia	Neri Parenti	Paolo Villaggio, Lino Banfi, Milly Carlucci	comedy	
Paulo Roberto Cotechiño centravanti di sfondamento	Nando Cicero	Alvaro Vitali, Carmen Russo	comedy	
Petomaniac	Pasquale Festa Campanile	Ugo Tognazzi, Mariangela Melato	Commedia all'italiana	
Un povero ricco	Pasquale Festa Campanile	Renato Pozzetto, Ornella Muti	comedy	
Questo e quello	Sergio Corbucci	Nino Manfredi, Renato Pozzetto, Janet Agren	Comedy	
Il ras del quartiere	Carlo Vanzina	Diego Abatantuono	comedy	
Red Bells II	Sergei Bondarchuk	Franco Nero, Sydne Rome	adventure-drama	
Rush	Tonino Ricci	Gordon Mitchell	Science fiction	
Sapore di mare 2 - Un anno dopo	Bruno Cortini	Massimo Ciavarro, Isabella Ferrari, Eleonora Giorgi	comedy	sequel of Time for Loving
A School Outing	Pupi Avati	Carlo Delle Piane	Commedia all'italiana	
Scusate il ritardo	Massimo Troisi	Massimo Troisi, Giuliana De Sio	comedy	
Segni particolari: bellissimo	Castellano & Pipolo	Adriano Celentano, Federica Moro	comedy	
The Seven Magnificent Gladiators	Claudio Fragasso, Bruno Mattei	Lou Ferrigno, Sybil Danning, Brad Harris	Peplum	
Sing Sing	Sergio Corbucci	Adriano Celentano, Enrico Montesano, Vanessa Redgrave	comedy	
Son contento	Maurizio Ponzi	Francesco Nuti, Barbara De Rossi, Carlo Giuffrè	comedy	
State buoni se potete	Luigi Magni	Johnny Dorelli, Philippe Leroy, Mario Adorf	historical comedy-drama	
The Story of Piera	Marco Ferreri	Isabelle Huppert, Hanna Schygulla, Marcello Mastroianni	drama	Entered into the 1983 Cannes Film Festival
The Throne of Fire	Franco Prosperi	Sabrina Siani, Pietro Torrisi, Harrison Muller, Jr.	—N/a	
Il tassinaro	Alberto Sordi	Alberto Sordi	comedy	
Thor the Conqueror	Tonino Ricci	Bruno Minniti, Maria Romano, Malisa Longo	—N/a	
Thunder Warrior	Fabrizio De Angelis	Mark Gregory, Valeria Cavalli	Action	
Thunder Warrior III	Larry Ludman	Mark Gregory, John Phillip Law, Werner Pochath	Action	
Il tifoso, l'arbitro e il calciatore	Pier Francesco Pingitore	Pippo Franco, Alvaro Vitali, Carmen Russo, Daniela Poggi	comedy	
Time for Loving	Carlo Vanzina	Jerry Calà, Christian De Sica, Isabella Ferrari, Virna Lisi	comedy	
Toxic Love	Claudio Caligari	Cesare Ferretti	drama	
La Traviata	Franco Zeffirelli	Teresa Stratas, Plácido Domingo	Opera	2 BAFTA. 2 Academy Award nominations. 3 Nastro d'Argento
Tu mi turbi	Roberto Benigni	Roberto Benigni, Olimpia Carlisi	comedy	
Vacanze di Natale	Carlo Vanzina	Jerry Calà, Christian De Sica, Stefania Sandrelli	comedy	Screened at the 67th Venice International Film Festival
Voyage in Time	Tonino Guerra, Andrei Tarkovsky	-	documentary	Screened at the 1995 Cannes Film Festival
Walking, Walking	Ermanno Olmi	Alberto Fumagalli	Religious	Screened at the 1983 Cannes Film Festival
Warrior of the Lost World	David Worth	Robert Ginty, Fred Williamson, Donald Pleasence	post-apocalyptic	
Where's Picone?	Nanni Loy	Giancarlo Giannini, Lina Sastri	Commedia all'italiana	
The World of Don Camillo	Terence Hill	Terence Hill, Colin Blakely, Lew Ayres	comedy	
Turbo Time	James Davis	Niki Lauda, Lello Garinei, Federico Urbán	documentary	Written by Mario Morra
Yor, the Hunter from the Future	Antonio Margheriti	Reb Brown, Corinne Cléry, John Steiner	Fantasy, science fiction	Italian-Turkish co-production
Zeder	Pupi Avati	Gabriele Lavia	Horror	
Zero in condotta	Giuliano Carnimeo	Elena Sofia Ricci	comedy	
