= Tonino Ricci =

Italian film director and screenwriter

- Born: 23 October 1927; Rome, Italy
- Died: 9 March 2014 (aged 86); Rome, Italy
- Occupations: Film director, screenwriter, film producer

Tonino Ricci (23 October 1927 – 9 March 2014), sometimes credited as Anthony Richmond, was an Italian film director and screenwriter.

Ricci was born Teodoro Ricci in Rome on October 23, 1927.

He began working in film as an assistant director in the early 1960s, being credited in such films as The Mercenaries (1961), Sword of the Conqueror (1961), Erik the Conqueror (1961), Thor and the Amazon Women (1963) and Superargo and the Faceless Giants (1968).

He made his directorial debut with the 1969 war film Salt in the Wound starring Klaus Kinski and George Hilton, for which he also contributed the story and worked on the screenplay. In 1971, he directed the giallo Cross Current, the spaghetti western Great Treasure Hunt starring Mark Damon and Rosalba Neri and, in 1972, the caper comedy Colpo Grosso.. Grossissimo...Anzi Probabile starring Terry-Thomas and Luciana Paluzzi.

In 1973, he directed the mafia film The Big Family, and the comedic genre mix Karate, Fists and Beans starring Dean Reed, Cris Huerta (as stand-in for Bud Spencer), Sal Borgese and Iwao Yoshioka. Bad Kids of the West, directed the same year, was a spaghetti western whose protagonists were Remo Capitani and a group of children, among them Andrea Balestri, who was well known to Italian audiences as the title character in the 1972 miniseries The Adventures of Pinocchio.

In Canada, after having acted as second unit director to Lucio Fulci on White Fang and Challenge to White Fang, Ricci himself directed the follow-up White Fang to the Rescue in 1974.

In 1976, he directed a second comedic genre-mix called Storia di arcieri, pugni e occhi neri (literally: Story of Archers, Fists and Blue Eyes), starring the bodybuilder Alan Steel as Robin Hood and Cris Huerta as Friar Tuck. In 1977, he went to Spain to direct the erotic melodrama Pasión and Delirio d'amore, both starring Maria José Cantudo and Macha Méril. In the following two years, Ricci directs two films in Italic-Hispanic-Mexican co-production, the first, Bermuda: Cave of the Sharks, involving a mysterious underwater civilisation and starring Andrés García, Janet Ågren and Arthur Kennedy, and the second, Encounter in the Deep, involving an underwater alien presence and starring Andrés Garcia, again, and Gianni Garko.

In 1982, Ricci directs the splatter film Panic, an Hispanic-Italian co-production starring David Warbeck and, again, Janet Ågren.

Ricci then directs four films with actor Conrad Nichols (Bruno Minniti) as protagonist: In 1983, he directs Thor the Conqueror (in the vein of Conan the Barbarian) and the post-apocalyptic film Rush (also starring Gordon Mitchell), both based on screenplays by Tito Carpi, which he follows with A Man Called Rage (also starring Werner Pochath and, again, Cris Huerta) in 1984. In 1986, he directs his last film with Minniti as protagonist, the war film Days of Hell set in Afghanistan.

In 1988, Ricci directs the action thriller Night of the Sharks starring Treat Williams, John Steiner, Christopher Connelly and, again, Janet Ågren and Sal Borgese. The same year, he also directs the war film I predatori della pietra magica set in Vietnam and involving cannibals and sorcery.

After having taken a break from directing, Ricci returns in 1993 to direct Buck at the Edge of Heaven starring John Savage, David Hess, Rik Battaglia and William Berger, and, returning again one last time in 1998, Buck and the Magic Bracelet, starring Matt McCoy and, in a small role, Bruno Minniti, his main protagonist in the 1980s.

Ricci died March 9, 2014, in Rome.

== Filmography ==
=== Assistant director ===
- The Mercenaries (1961)
- Sword of the Conqueror (1961)
- Vacanze alla Baia d'Argento (1961)
- Erik the Conqueror (1961)
- Conquest of the Normans (1962)
- Thor and the Amazon Women (1963)
- E Mezzzanotte...Butta Giu il Cadavere (1966)
- 10,000 Dollars for a Massacre (1967)
- Superargo and the Faceless Giants (1968)
- God Made Them...I Kill Them (1968)
- Ciccio Forgives, I Don't (1968)
- The Nephews of Zorror (1968)

=== Second unit director ===
- White Fang (1973)
- Challenge to White Fang (1974)

=== As director ===
- Salt in the Wound (1969)
- The Liberators (1969)
- Cross Current (1971)
- Great Treasure Hunt (1971)
- Colpo Grosso.. Grossissimo...Anzi Probabile (1972)
- The Big Family (1973)
- Karate, Fists and Beans (1973)
- Bad Kids of the West (1973)
- White Fang to the Rescue (1974)
- Storia di Arcieri, Pugni e Occhi Neri (1976)
- Delirio d'Amore (1977)
- Pasion (1977)
- Delirio d'amore (1977)
- The Shark's Cave (1978)
- Encounter in the Deep (1979)
- Panic (1983)
- Thor the Conqueror (1983)
- Rush (1983)
- A Man Called Rage (1984)
- Days of Hell (1986)
- Night of the Sharks (1988)
- Predators of the Magic Stone (1988)
- Buck at the Edge of Heaven (1991)
- Buck and the Magic Bracelet (1998)
