= White Fang =

1906 novel by Jack London

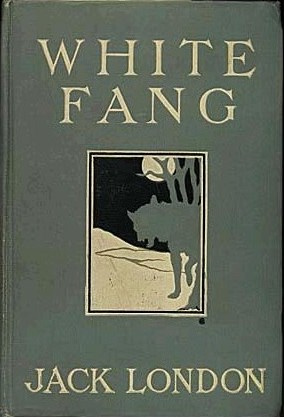
- First edition cover
- Author: Jack London
- Language: English
- Genre: Adventure
- Set in: Santa Clara Valley and the Yukon.
- Publisher: Macmillan
- Publication date: October 1906
- Publication place: United States
- Media type: Print (serial, hardback & paperback)
- Pages: 298 pp (2001 Scholastic paperback)
- ISBN: 978-1-85813-740-7
- Dewey Decimal: 813.52
- LC Class: PS3523 .O46
- Text: White Fang at Wikisource

White Fang is a novel by American author Jack London (1876–1916) about a wild wolf dog's journey to domestication in Yukon Territory and the Northwest Territories during the 1890s Klondike Gold Rush. First serialized in Outing magazine between May and October 1906, it was published in book form in October 1906. It is a companion novel (and a thematic mirror) to London's best-known work, The Call of the Wild (1903), which is about a kidnapped, domesticated dog embracing his wild ancestry to survive and thrive in the wild.

Much of White Fang is written from the viewpoint of the titular canine character, enabling London to explore how animals view their world and how they view humans. White Fang examines the violent world of wild animals and the equally violent world of humans. The book also explores complex themes including morality and redemption.

As early as 1925, the story was adapted to film, and it has since seen several more cinematic adaptations, including a 1991 film starring Ethan Hawke and a 2018 original film for Netflix.

== Plot summary ==
The story begins before the wolf-dog hybrid is born, with two men and their sled dog team on a journey to deliver the coffin of Lord Alfred to a remote town named Fort McGurry in the higher area of the Yukon Territory. The men, Bill and Henry, are stalked by a large pack of starving wolves over the course of several days. Finally, after all of their dogs and Bill have been eaten, Henry is rescued at the last moment; the wolf pack scatters when they hear the large group of people coming.

The story then follows the pack, which has been robbed of its last prey. When the pack finally brings down a moose, the famine is ended; they eventually split up, and the story now follows a she-wolf and her mate, One Eye. One Eye claimed her after defeating and killing a younger rival. The she-wolf gives birth to a litter of five pups by the Mackenzie River, and all but one die from hunger. One Eye is killed by a lynx while trying to rob her den for food for the she-wolf and her pup; his mate later discovers his remains near the lynx's den. The surviving pup and the she-wolf are left to fend for themselves. Shortly afterward, the she-wolf kills all the lynx's kittens to feed her pup, prompting the lynx to track her down, and a vicious fight breaks out. The she-wolf eventually kills the lynx, but suffers severe injury; the lynx carcass is devoured over a period of seven days as the she-wolf recovers from her injuries.

One day, the pup comes across five indigenous people, and the she-wolf comes to his rescue. One man, Grey Beaver, recognizes the she-wolf as his late brother's wolf dog, Ktiche, who left during a famine. Grey Beaver's brother is dead, so he takes Ktiche and her pup and names the cub "White Fang." White Fang has a harsh life in the native camp; the current puppy pack, seeing him as a wolf, immediately attacks him. The Natives protect him, but the pups never accept him, and the pups' leader, Lip-Lip, singles him out for persecution. White Fang grows to become a savage, callous, morose, solitary, and deadly fighter, "the enemy of his kind."

At this time, White Fang is separated from his mother, who is sold off to another Native camp by Three Eagles. He earns the respect of Grey Beaver when he saves his son MitSah from a group of boys seeking revenge for White Fang attacking one of them for trying to beat him for no reason. When a famine occurs, he runs away into the woods and encounters his mother, Kiche, only for her to chase him away, for she has a new litter of pups and has forgotten him. He also encounters Lip-Lip, whom he fights and kills before returning to the camp.

When White Fang is five years old, he is taken to Fort Yukon, so that Grey Beaver can trade with the gold-hunters. There, a malicious dog-fighter named "Beauty" Smith connives to get Grey Beaver addicted to whiskey, and then when he is drunk sell White Fang to him. White Fang defeats all opponents pitted against him, including several wolves and a lynx, until a bulldog called Cherokee is brought in by a faro-dealer named Tim Keenan to fight him. Cherokee has the upper hand in the fight when he grips the skin and fur of White Fang's neck and begins to throttle him. White Fang nearly suffocates, but is rescued when a rich mining expert, Weedon Scott, stops the fight, and forcibly buys White Fang from Beauty Smith.

Scott attempts to tame White Fang, and after a long, patient effort, he succeeds. When Scott attempts to return to California alone, White Fang pursues him, and Scott decides to take the dog with him back home. In Sierra Vista, White Fang must adjust to the laws of the estate. At the end of the book, an escaped convict, Jim Hall, tries to kill Scott's father, Judge Scott, for sentencing him to prison for a crime he did not commit, not knowing that Hall was "railroaded." White Fang kills Hall and is nearly killed himself, but survives. As a result, the women of Scott's estate name him "the Blessed Wolf." The story ends with White Fang relaxing in the sun with the puppies he has fathered with the sheep-dog Collie.

== Characters ==
- White Fang, (main character) the novel's protagonist, is a wolf dog who was born wild but becomes more dog-like after Gray Beaver domesticates him. He gets bullied by Lip-Lip and is forced to become a fighting dog when he is bought by Beauty Smith. However, his life changed when a loving master named Weedon Scott buys him and takes him to his home in Santa Clara Valley in California. He eventually becomes a part of the family after saving Judge Scott from Jim Hall.
- Kiche, White Fang's mother, is a sled dog formerly owned by Gray Beaver's now-dead brother, known at the beginning of the novel as the "she-wolf." She is possibly named for the Algonquian deity Gitche Manitou.
- Lip-Lip, a canine pup, also lives in the Native American village and bullies White Fang until White Fang kills him in a fight.
- One-Eye, White Fang's father, is a true wolf who was killed by the lynx.
- Cherokee, a bulldog, was the only dog to defeat White Fang until Weedon Scott saved White Fang.
- Collie, a sheepdog, is the mother of White Fang's whelps.
- The Lynx, an aggressive Canada lynx, was responsible for killing One-Eye, but later gets killed by Kiche.

Major human characters:

- Gray Beaver, a Native American chief, is White Fang's first master. He is a neutral master, neither as cruel as Beauty Smith nor as kind as Weedon Scott.
- Beauty Smith, the main antagonist of the novel and White Fang's second master, is a dogfighter.
- Weedon Scott, a wealthy gold hunter, is White Fang's third master and the first one to truly show affection towards him.
- Matt, Weedon Scott's assistant, helps tame White Fang.
- Judge Scott, Weedon Scott's father, accepts White Fang as a member of the family after he saves him from Jim Hall.
- Jim Hall, a violent fugitive, tries to get revenge on Judge Scott, but gets killed by White Fang.
- Henry is a character appearing in the introduction of the novel, carrying the coffin of Lord Alfred with Bill.
- Bill is a character appearing in the introduction of the novel alongside Henry and is killed by the wolves led by Kiche.
- Three Eagles, a Native American, buys Kiche from Gray Beaver.
- Tim Keenan, a faro-dealer who is the owner of Cherokee, the first dog to defeat White Fang until Weedon Scott intervenes.

== Major themes ==
Critics have identified many underlying themes in the novel. Tom Feller describes the story as "an allegory of humanity's progression from nature to civilization." He also expresses that "the [story's] implication is that the metamorphosis of both the individual and society will require violence at some point." Paul Deane states, "[In the novel,] society demands a conformity that undermines individualism." London himself took influence from Herbert Spencer's words, "survival of the fittest," as well as Friedrich Nietzsche's idea of a "superman" (or "superdog," in this instance) and of "the worship of power."

The novel is partly an autobiographical allegory based on London's conversion from teenaged hoodlum to married, middle-class writer. In writing it, he was influenced by the ideas of Herbert Spencer, Karl Marx, and Friedrich Nietzsche. Conditions in the US also influenced the story.

== Publication history ==
Since the novel has been published, it has been translated into over 89 different languages and released as a three-volume Braille edition.

== Reception ==
Upon its release, White Fang was an immediate success worldwide, and became especially popular among younger readers. Robert Greenwood called White Fang "one of London's most interesting and ambitious works." Virginia Crane claims that the novel is "generally regarded as artistically inferior to its companion piece [The Call of the Wild], but [that it] helped establish London as a popular American literary figure."

Shortly after the book's publication, London became a target in what would later be called the nature fakers controversy, a literary debate highlighting the conflict between science and sentiment in popular nature writing. President Theodore Roosevelt, who first spoke out against the "sham naturalists" in 1907, specifically named London as one of the so-called "nature fakers." Citing an example from White Fang, Roosevelt referred to the fight between the bulldog and the wolfdog "the very sublimity of absurdity." London only responded to the criticism after the controversy had ended. In a 1908 essay entitled "The Other Animals," he wrote:

I have been guilty of writing two books about dogs. The writing of these two stories, on my part, was in truth a protest against the "humanizing" of animals, of which it seemed to me several "animal writers" had been profoundly guilty. Time and again, and many times, in my narratives, I wrote, speaking of my dog-heroes: "He did not think these things; he merely did them," etc. And I did this repeatedly, to the clogging of my narrative and in violation of my artistic canons; and I did it in order to hammer into the average human understanding that these dog-heroes of mine were not directed by abstract reasoning, but by instinct, sensation and emotion, and by simple reasoning. Also, I endeavored to make my stories in line with the facts of evolution; I hewed them to the mark set by scientific research, and awoke, one day, to find myself bundled neck and crop into the camp of the nature-fakers.

== Adaptations ==
The novel has been adapted into numerous motion pictures and sequels, animated specials, and an audiobook format. A television series, White Fang, was filmed in Arrowtown, New Zealand, in 1993.

=== Films ===
- White Fang (1925)
- White Fang (1936)
- White Fang (1946)
- White Fang (1973)
- Challenge to White Fang (1974)
- White Fang to the Rescue (1974)
- White Fang and the Hunter (1975)
- Zanna Bianca e il grande Kid (1977)
- The Story of White Fang (1982), Shiroi Kiba Monogatari, Japanese anime film produced by Studio DEEN
- White Fang (1991)
- White Fang 2: Myth of the White Wolf (1994)
- White Fang (1997)
- White Fang (2018)

=== Television series ===
- The Legend of White Fang (1992)
- White Fang (1993)

=== Music ===
- "White Mountain" on the album Trespass by Genesis (1970)
