= One on Top of the Other =

1969 film directed by Lucio Fulci

- Italian film poster
- Directed by: Lucio Fulci
- Screenplay by: Lucio Fulci; Roberto Gianviti; José Luis Martínez Mollá
- Story by: Roberto Gianviti; Lucio Fulci
- Produced by: Edmondo Amati
- Starring: Jean Sorel; Marisa Mell; Elsa Martinelli; John Ireland; Alberto de Mendoza; Jean Sobieski; Faith Domergue
- Cinematography: Alejandro Ulloa
- Edited by: Ornella Micheli
- Music by: Riz Ortolani
- Production companies: Empire Films; Les Productions Jacques Roitfeld; Trébol Films C.C.
- Distributed by: Fida Cinematografica (Italy); Alpha (France); Atlántida Films (Spain)
- Release dates: 22 August 1969 (Rome); 25 November 1969 (Spain); 23 August 1970 (France)
- Running time: 108 minutes
- Countries: Italy; France; Spain
- Languages: Italian; English
- Budget: ₤445 million
- Box office: ₤869 million

One on Top of the Other (Italian: Una sull'altra, which the English title translates accurately but without expressing twice the feminine), also known as Perversion Story, is a 1969 giallo film directed by Lucio Fulci. Written by Fulci and Roberto Gianviti, the film stars Jean Sorel, Marisa Mell, Elsa Martinelli, Alberto de Mendoza and John Ireland. The first giallo directed by Fulci, its plot concerns George Dumurrier (Sorel), an unscrupulous San Franciscan doctor who is suspected of orchestrating the death of his asthmatic wife Susan (Mell) as part of an insurance scam, despite her seeming reemergence as Monica Weston, a high-class stripper.

One on Top of the Other was filmed on location in several United States cities, including a scene filmed in San Quentin State Prison's gas chamber. The film went on to gross 869,000,000 Italian lire and has been cited as a thematic precursor to later films such as Basic Instinct and Body of Evidence.

== Plot ==
George Dumurrier is a wealthy and self-centered San Francisco doctor who runs a clinic with his younger brother Henry, but leaves care of his asthma-stricken wife Susan to her sister Martha and a local nurse. He is engaged in an affair with Jane, the personal assistant to Larry, a trendy photographer. Although very much in love with George, Jane is fatalistic about the future of their relationship.

George and Jane travel out of town for a romantic break in Reno. But after arriving at the casino, George receives a phone call from Henry, telling him that Susan has died during a violent asthma attack. Returning home, George is consoled by Henry but frozen out by the hostile Martha, who always disapproved of George marrying her sister. However, a $1 million life insurance policy left by Susan is a timely bonus for George's recklessly extended business enterprise. An insurance agent begins tailing George, discovers his affair with Jane, and brings his suspicions to a local police detective, Inspector Wald.

Meanwhile, an anonymous tip-off leads George and Jane to The Roaring Twenties, a strip club where they are both astonished at the appearance of Monica, a stripper who, although a blonde, bears an uncanny resemblance to Susan. George is morbidly attracted to her and soon embarks on an affair that is part-detection, part-willing seduction. When the police, who have been tailing him, arrest Monica, she tells them that she was paid to pose as Susan by a woman calling herself Betty. Monica, as the police discover, is a popular fixture lately among the city's high-class prostitutes. She has a devoted wealthy client, Benjamin Wormser, whose hopeless passion she toys with. When Benjamin hears about Monica's arrest, he arrives at the police station with her exorbitant bail, but soon discovers that she has already been sprung by someone the police will not name.

A police search of Monica's apartment turns up an envelope containing money. When George's fingerprints are found on the envelope, he is charged with murdering his wife for the insurance money. Monica goes missing, and George is tried, convicted and sentenced to death. Some months later, on the eve of George's execution, Henry arrives for a visit where, in the privacy of an interrogation room, he reveals the truth: he and Susan hatched up this entire plot to get him out of the way and get the insurance money all for themselves. Monica was really Susan all along and faked her own death to implicate him. After Henry leaves, George tries to get a stay of execution by informing his lawyer about what Henry said. But despite some last-minute investigation by Inspector Wald, George is unable to clear his name. Only Jane continues to believe his innocence, but she is held in check by Larry.

The day arrives as George is taken out of his cell to the gas chamber to be executed, still protesting his innocence. At the last moment, a phone rings where the governor orders the execution halted as a telex arrives at the local FBI office that is forwarded to the prison authorities. In a twist of fate, police in Paris have informed the US authorities that Susan and Henry have been shot dead in a local café by the spurned and jealous Benjamin.

== Cast ==
- Jean Sorel as Dr. George Dummurrier
- Marisa Mell as Susan Dummurrier / Monica Weston
- Elsa Martinelli as Jane Bleeker
- John Ireland as Inspector Wald
- Alberto de Mendoza as Henry Dumurrier
- Riccardo Cucciolla as Benjamin Wormser
- Faith Domergue as Martha Davis
- George Rigaud as Arthur Mitchell
- Jean Sobieski as Larry
- Bill Vanders as Steve Howard
- Franco Balducci as Officer Loveday
- Giuseppe Addobbati as Brent
- Félix Dafauce as Insurance Official
- Jesús Puente as Sergeant Rodriguez

Uncredited

- Malisa Longo as Elizabeth O'Neill
- Geoffrey Copleston as District Attorney
- Janet Agren as Monica’s Neighbor
- Lucio Fulci as Graphologist
- Bobby Rhodes as Prison Guard
- Raffaele Mottola as Governor

== Production ==
Prior to One on Top of the Other, director and screenwriter Lucio Fulci had mostly worked in comedies. The move to the giallo genre was a big change for Fulci, and may be that he was simply dabbling in an emergent and popular genre. One on Top of the Other has been cited as having been inspired by Alfred Hitchcock's film Vertigo. Fulci felt that the script for One on Top of the Other was among his best work. Fulci and fellow writer Roberto Gianviti collaborated on a number of films together, including Operation St. Peter's, A Lizard in a Woman's Skin, White Fang, Challenge to White Fang and Sette note in nero. Edmondo Amati agreed to produce the film as he was already present in the United States, working on Alberto De Martino's Carnal Circuit. Fulci worked with two assistant directors on the film, Mario Castellani and Albino Cocco, while Vittoria Vigorelli acted as script supervisor. Future Oscar-winning producer Gray Frederickson, later known for his collaborations with Francis Ford Coppola, served as the film's location manager.

Much of the film was shot on location in San Francisco, Reno and Sacramento; however, interior shots were filmed in Italy. Production began on 2 December 1968 and lasted eight weeks. The film's gas chamber scene was filmed on location in the gas chamber at San Quentin State Prison in California.

== Release ==
One on Top of the Other was distributed in Italy by Fida Cinematografica. It was first released in Rome on August 22, 1969. It went on to gross approximately 869 million lira (US$1.39 m). Several versions of the film exist; the uncut Italian version, Una sull'altra, has a runtime of 108 minutes. Most English-dubbed prints run for 103 minutes, with cuts made to the film's sex scenes and several on-location establishing shots, while the French version, Perversion Story, features a 97-minute runtime due to the removal of expositive scenes while retaining the sex scenes. The French version, with English and Italian audio, was released on DVD by Severin Films in a two-disc set also containing a CD of the film's soundtrack.

It was released in France on August 23, 1970 by Alpha France as Perversion Story.

On 2 January 2018 Mondo Macabro announced that they would release the film in its "longest, most complete form" on Blu-ray during the year. The distributor released their limited edition Blu-ray, consisting of a print run of 1000 copies, on 28 August via mail-order on their website. This release, presented in an uncut 108 minute version with English and Italian audio tracks, was restored from the original negative (with additional scenes provided by a 35mm print). The special features included are the film's trailer, interviews with Sorel, Martinelli and Fulci biographer Stephen Thrower, a wraparound slipcover illustrated by Justin Coffee, a reversible interior cover sleeve replicating the film's Italian and French posters, a 12-page liner notes booklet featuring an essay by critic Roberto Curti, and miniature reproductions of German lobby cards and a poster for the film. A retail Blu-ray, which does not include the slipcover, reversible cover sleeve, booklet or lobbycards, was released on 13 November.

== Reception ==
AllMovie's Donald Guarisco felt that the film was "a memorable example of [Lucio Fulci's] work", noting that it "isn't quite as masterful as Argento or Mario Bava's best giallo outings, but Una Sull'Altra is a worthy, well-crafted outing that fans of the genre will find impressive." The film has been cited as a thematic precursor to the later films Basic Instinct and Body of Evidence. Writing for DVD Talk, Ian Jane rated the film four stars out of five, calling it "a well made thriller with some great twists, a strong plot and some fine performances". Jane compared the film to Double Face, an earlier film Fulci had co-plotted for Riccardo Freda. The film has been described as contributing to the emergence of the giallo genre as one of increasing eroticism during the late 1960s and early 1970s.
