= Days of Inspector Ambrosio =

1988 film directed by Sergio Corbucci

- Italian theatrical release poster by Enzo Sciotti
- Directed by: Sergio Corbucci
- Screenplay by: Giorgio Arlorio; Cesare Frugoni; Sergio Corbucci
- Story by: Giorgio Arlorio; Cesare Frugoni
- Based on: Inspector Ambrosio by Renato Olivieri
- Produced by: Claudio Bonivento
- Starring: Ugo Tognazzi; Carlo Delle Piane; Carla Gravina; Claudio Amendola; Pupella Maggio
- Cinematography: Danilo Desideri
- Edited by: Ruggero Mastroianni
- Music by: Armando Trovajoli
- Production companies: Numero Uno International; Reteitalia
- Distributed by: Consorzio Italiano Distributori Indipendenti Film (CIDIF)
- Release date: 21 October 1988
- Running time: 96 minutes
- Language: Italian

Days of Inspector Ambrosio (Italian: I giorni del commissario Ambrosio) is a 1988 Italian crime film directed by Sergio Corbucci. It is loosely based on several novels written by Renato Olivieri.

== Plot ==
A few days before Inspector Ambrosio's holiday, a usual bank robbery takes place opposite his house. Then a playboy dies in a car “accident” that points to murder. The Inspector finds that his chief witness, a timid violinist and his drug-addicted daughter were closely involved with the victim. Can he “clear his desk” in time for his well-earned break?

== Cast ==
- Ugo Tognazzi: Commissario Ambrosio
- Carlo Delle Piane: Renzo Bandelli
- Claudio Amendola: Luciano
- Cristina Marsillach: Sandra
- Amanda Sandrelli: Antonia Quadri
- Duilio Del Prete: Francesco Borghi
- Rossella Falk: Rossella
- Carla Gravina: Giulia Bandelli
- Athina Cenci: Emanuela Quadri
- Pupella Maggio: Rosa Cuomo
- Teo Teocoli: Barbieri
- Elvire Audray: "Friend" of Barbieri
- Elio Crovetto: Carlo De Silva
- Sal Borgese: Reggiani
