= Panic (1983 film) =

1983 film directed by Tonino Ricci

- Italian film poster
- Directed by: Tonino Ricci
- Written by: Víctor Andrés Catena; Jaime Comas Gil
- Produced by: Marcello Romeo
- Starring: David Warbeck; Janet Agren
- Cinematography: Giovanni Bergamini
- Edited by: Vincenzo Tomassi
- Music by: Marcello Giombini
- Production companies: European Films Distribuzione; Nuova Galassia Film; Arco Films
- Release dates: March 24, 1983 (Bologna); August 5, 1985 (Spain)
- Running time: 90 minutes
- Countries: Italy; Spain

Panic (Italian: Bakterion) is a 1983 science fiction horror film directed by Tonino Ricci, and starring David Warbeck and Janet Agren. It was an Italian and Spanish co-production.

== Plot summary ==
A scientist is accidentally mutated into a blood-drinking monster by the pathogens upon which he was experimenting. The government, fearful that the disease may be contagious, orders an airstrike of the small town where the monster operates. With the lives of over a thousand people on the line, a lone agent must race against time to kill the monster before the airstrike takes place.

== Cast ==
- David Warbeck as Captain Kirk
- Janet Agren as Jane Blake
- Roberto Ricci as Professor Adams
- José Lifante as Sergeant O'Brien
- Miguel Herrera as Professor Vince
- Eugenio Benito as Father Braun
- Ovidio Taito
- José María Labernié as Colonel Rutledge
- Ilaria Maria Bianchi
- Fabián Conde as Drunk
- Vittorio Calò
- Franco Ressel as Mr. Milton

== Production ==
It was an Italian and Spanish co-production between the Rome-based companies European Films Distribuzione and Nuova Galassia Film and the Madrid-based Arco Film. Along with Hell of the Living Dead (1980) and Nightmare City (1981) one of the handful of Italian and Spanish co-productions of the era about accidents caused by scientists that lead to attacks from monsters.

An entire sequence of Panic was re-used in the later film, Il mostro di Firenze a film that went through several production problems and only released on home video years after its release.

== Release and reception ==
Panic was released in Bologna as Bakterion in Italy on March 24, 1983. The film grossed 290 million Italian lire. The film was also released as being part of the Zombie film series, as Zombi 4 in Greece. It was released in Spain on August 5, 1985 as Pánico.

In 1984, the Paris-based La Saison cinématographique reviewed the film saying its screenplay was confusing and incoherent and found that it was relatively soft in terms of gory special effects and lacking depth in its ecological themes. The reviewer summarized that it was a film to be forgotten nearly immediately.

== See also ==
- List of Italian films of 1983
