= Rossella Falk =

Italian actress (1926–2013)

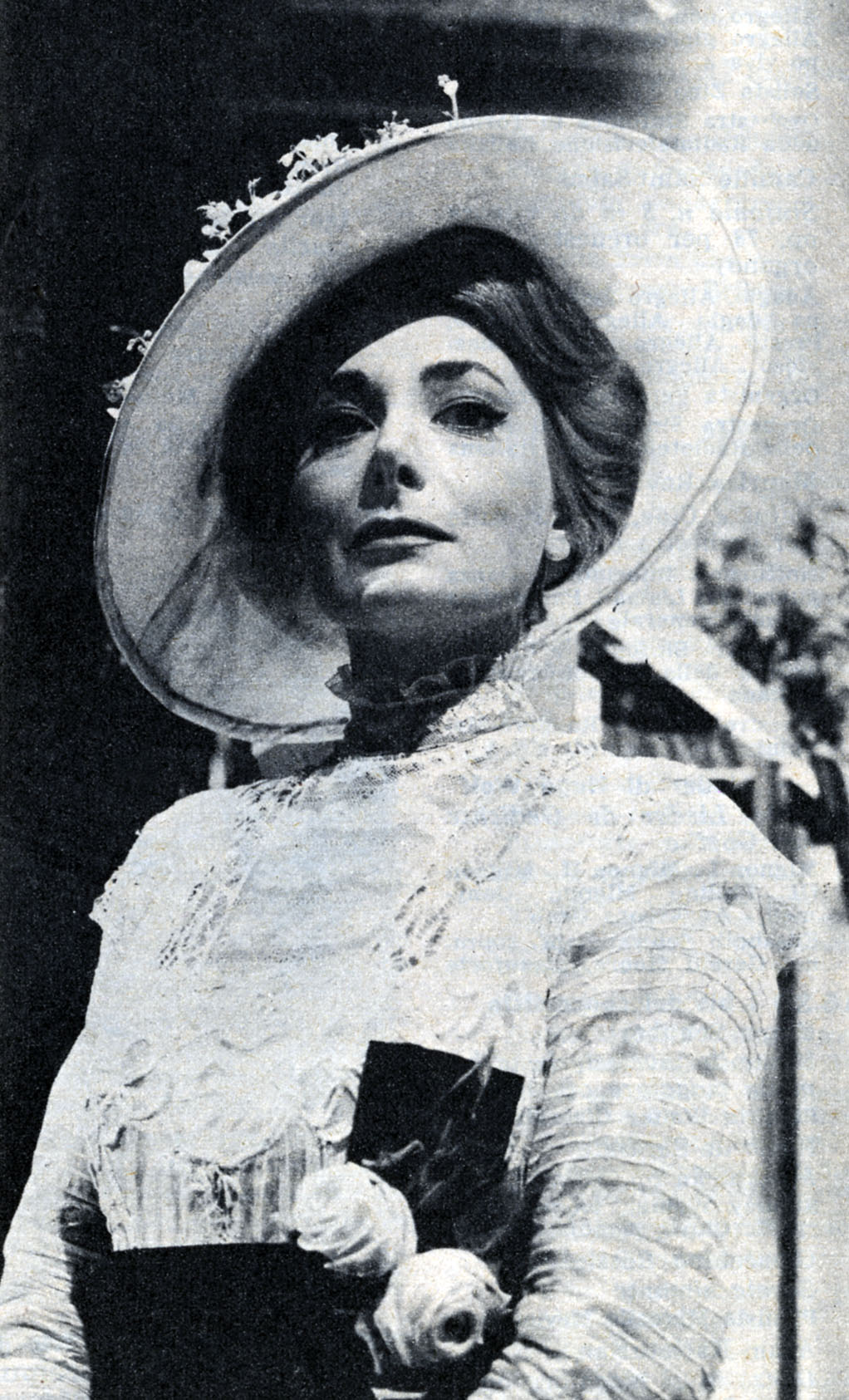
- Falk in 1957
- Born: Rosa Antonia Falzacappa; 10 November 1926; Rome, Kingdom of Italy
- Died: 5 May 2013 (aged 86); Rome, Italy
- Years active: 1948–2004
- Height: 5 ft 9 1/4 in (1.759 m)
- Spouse(s): Nicola Tufari (?–1966) (his death); Gualtiero Giori (1976–1980) (divorced)

Rossella Falk (10 November 1926 – 5 May 2013) was an Italian actress. She had a long career and is possibly best known for appearing in 8½ by Federico Fellini in 1963.

== Life and career ==
Born in Rome as Rosa Antonia Falzacappa, Falk graduated from the Accademia d'Arte Drammatica in May 1948, a few months after having received the best new actress award at the World Youth Festival in Prague. In a few years she established herself as one of the more talented and requested Italian stage actresses. In 1951 she started a long collaboration with the director Luchino Visconti with the role of Stella in an adaptation of the play A Streetcar Named Desire.

In 1954, after having worked at the Piccolo Teatro in Milan, directed by Giorgio Strehler in La mascherata, Falk started, together with Giorgio De Lullo, Anna Maria Guarnieri, Romolo Valli and Umberto Orsini, the stage company "La compagnia dei giovani" with whom she achieved national and international success. Leaving the company in the 1970s, she continued her stage career working among others with Franco Zeffirelli, Gabriele Lavia, Giuseppe Patroni Griffi.

Less active in cinema, she is probably best known for her role in Federico Fellini's 8½, Falk was also active in television series and radio plays. Her last work was the 2009 stage play Est Ovest, in which she was directed by Cristina Comencini.

== Filmography ==
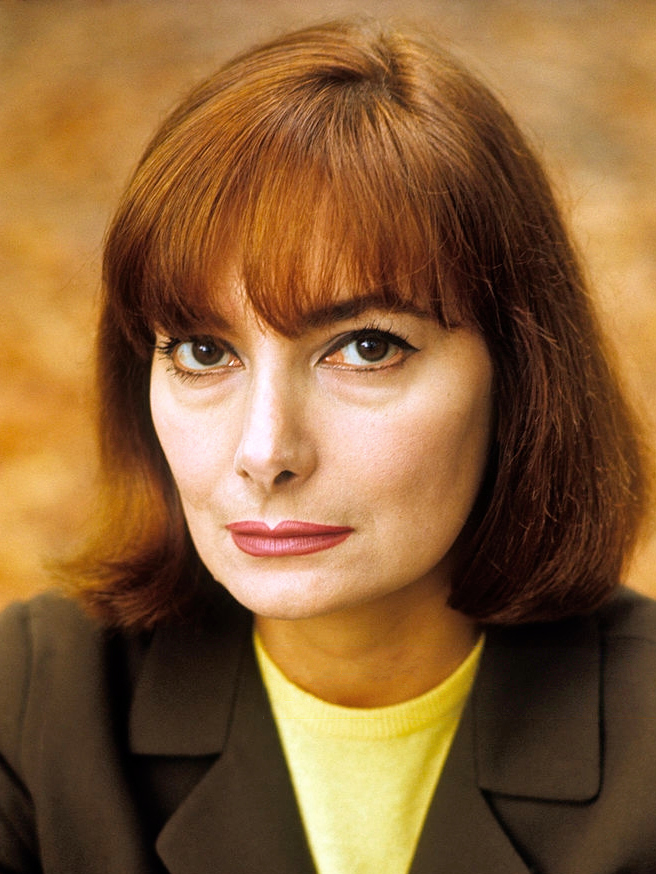
Falk in 1965

Year	Title	Director	Role	Refs
1948	Guarany	Riccardo Freda		
1954	Angels of Darkness	Giuseppe Amato	Morena	
1960	Vento del sud	Franco Provenzale	Deodata Macri	
1964	8½	Federico Fellini	Rosella	
1965	Made in Italy	Nanni Loy	Erminia, His Wife (segment "5 'La Famiglia', episode 2")	
1966	Modesty Blaise	Joseph Losey	Mrs. Fothergill	
1968	The Legend of Lylah Clare	Robert Aldrich	Rossella	
1968	Run, Psycho, Run	Brunello Rondi		
1970	May Morning	Ugo Liberatore	Mrs. Finley	
1971	The Fifth Cord	Luigi Bazzoni	Sophia Bini	
1971	Black Belly of the Tarantula	Paolo Cavara	Franca Valentino	
1972	Seven Blood-Stained Orchids	Umberto Lenzi	Elena Marchi	
1972	The Killer Is on the Phone	Alberto De Martino	Margaret Vervoort	
1988	Days of Inspector Ambrosio	Sergio Corbucci	Moglie di Vittorio Borghi	
1995	Love Story with Cramps	Pino Quartullo	Directrice agenzia	
2001	Sleepless	Dario Argento	Laura de Fabritiis	
