= The Left Hand of the Law =

- DVD cover
- Directed by: Giuseppe Rosati
- Starring: Leonard Mann; James Mason
- Cinematography: Riccardo Pallottini
- Edited by: Mario Morra
- Music by: Paolo Vasile
- Release date: 1975
- Country: Italy
- Languages: Italian; English

The Left Hand of the Law (Italian: La polizia interviene: ordine di uccidere, lit. 'Police intervene: order to kill') is a 1975 Italian "poliziottesco" written and directed by Giuseppe Rosati.

== Cast ==
- Leonard Mann: Captain Mario Murri
- James Mason: Senator Leandri
- Stephen Boyd: Lanza
- Enrico Maria Salerno: Minister
- Antonella Murgia: Laura
- Fausto Tozzi: Giulio Costello
- Janet Ågren: Gloria
- Franco Interlenghi: Colombo
- Ennio Balbo: Lombardi
- Peppino Di Capri: Singer
