= White Fang and the Hunter =

1975 film

- Directed by: Alfonso Brescia
- Starring: Robert Woods
- Cinematography: Silvio Fraschetti
- Music by: Alessandro Alessandroni
- Release date: 1975
- Language: Italian

Zanna Bianca e il cacciatore solitario (internationally released as White Fang and the Hunter) is a 1975 Italian adventure film directed by Alfonso Brescia. Despite the title tries to market the commercial success of Lucio Fulci's White Fang, the film's plot has no connection with the novel. The film was poorly received by critics, being defined as "pathetic" and marked as "trash", and gained some cult status in reason of its reputation.

== Cast ==
- Robert Woods: Sandy Shaw
- Ignazio Spalla: Dollar
- Malisa Longo: Connie
- Robert Hundar: Ferguson
- Franco Lantieri: Trent
- Linda Sini: Luna
