= Renato Olivieri =

Italian novelist and journalist (1925–2013)

Renato Olivieri (4 August 1925 – 8 February 2013) was an Italian novelist and journalist.

Born in 1925 in Sanguinetto, Verona, Olivieri spent his childhood in Turin and at 14 he moved to Milan, where he lived until his death in 2013. A professional journalist, he directed several magazines for the editor Mondadori. He debuted as a writer in 1978, with the giallo-noir novel Il caso Kodra (The Kodra Case); the main character of the novel, the Inspector Ambrosio, became in a short time one of the most famous detectives in Italian literature, with a total of 15 novels about his investigations written by Olivieri between 1978 and 1998. A film based on the character, Days of Inspector Ambrosio, was released in 1988, with Ugo Tognazzi in the title role.
