= Aladdin (1986 film) =

1986 fantasy comedy film

- Directed by: Bruno Corbucci
- Written by: Mario Amendola; Marcello Fondato; Bruno Corbucci
- Produced by: Ugo Tucci
- Starring: Bud Spencer; Luca Venantini; Janet Agren; Julian Voloshin
- Cinematography: Silvano Ippoliti
- Music by: Fabio Frizzi
- Production company: Cannon Italia
- Distributed by: Italian International Film
- Release dates: December 23, 1986 (Rome & Milan)
- Running time: 95 minutes
- Country: Italy

Aladdin (Italian: Superfantagenio) is a 1986 Italian fantasy comedy film directed by Bruno Corbucci. starring Bud Spencer as the Genie and Luca Venantini as Aladdin.

The film was shot in Miami, Florida and released in December 1986 in Italy. Variety noted it did not perform as well as other films in the Christmas seasons at Italian theaters.

== Plot ==
Al Haddin, nicknamed "Aladdin", is a 14-year-old boy who lives with his widowed mother Janet and his alcoholic grandfather Jeremiah in Miami, Florida. Al's mother works in a nightclub owned by Monty Siracusa, a local mobster boss who runs a citywide protection racket. Jeremiah wastes the little money Janet makes on alcohol and horse races. Al has to work part-time in an antique shop to support his family.

Al's boss brings an old lamp, which a fisherman acquaintance of his has just salvaged from the ocean, to the store and orders Al to polish it. As Al rubs on the lamp, a genie suddenly appears before him and proclaims him his new master. Al begins to use the genie's power to fulfill some of his most eager wishes: beating up a bully and his gang, winning the affection of Patricia, his long-time crush, and riding in a real Rolls-Royce, something his late father had always dreamed of.

The presence of the Genie and his powers begin to draw unwanted attention. Patricia's father, Police Sergeant O'Connor, becomes suspicious of the brand-new Rolls-Royce cars Al suddenly gets out of nowhere. The Genie interferes with Siracusa's illicit business, which infuriates the latter, and he is arrested twice for driving without a license. He escapes from jail both times by disappearing when summoned by Al, baffling the police superintendent. Al is kidnapped by a band of child snatchers but has to wait until the morning before the Genie comes to rescue him and the other kidnapped children because the Genie's powers only work during the day, as they have to regenerate overnight. The Chief of the Police learns of the Genie's mysterious abilities and orders his superintendent to bring the Genie to him.

Siracusa, furious about his criminal operations being disrupted, abducts Janet and Jeremiah to question them about the Genie. Although it is night when Al summons him, the Genie's human strength proves enough to finish Siracusa's gang by himself, and the gangsters are arrested. Under a false pretense, the Genie is taken away to be dissected, but Al finds him before the operation starts and discloses to the Chief that he is a genie who possesses magical powers. The Chief then asks Al to have the Genie disable the entire world's military arsenal - all except of his own private army, so that he can seize control over the world. The Genie refuses to fulfill this wish, as it would seriously upset the balance of power, and he and Al make their escape on the Chief's office carpet converted into a flying carpet.

The pair proceeds to the Bermuda Triangle, where the Genie prepares to sink the lamp into the depths of the sea to prevent his powers from being abused. Al, however, unwilling to let his friend go, asks for one final wish, which is fulfilled. With the reward money from Siracusa's capture, the Haddins buy the nightclub and celebrate its reopening, with the Genie staying with them as a normal human being.

== Cast ==
- Bud Spencer as The Genie
- Luca Venantini as Al Haddin
- Janet Agren as Janet Haddin
- Umberto Raho as the Police Chief
- Raffaele Mottola as the Police Superintendent
- Julian Voloshin as Jeremiah, Al's grandpa
- Diamy Spencer as Patricia O'Connor
- Tony Adams as Monty Siracusa

== Production ==
Aladdin was shot in Miami. The film was produced by Cannon Italia, the Italian production arm of The Cannon Group.

== Release and reception ==
Aladdin was released in Rome and Milan on December 23, 1986 in Italy. It was distributed by Italian International Film in Italy. Young described it as faring less well than other holiday films in Italy. The film was screened as Aladdin in Birmingham, Alabama on March 6, 1987. In the United States, the film was distributed by Cannon Films.

Deborah Young of Variety reviewed the film in Rome on January 3, 1987. Young said the film was not very imaginative and that it may be too tame for some younger audiences tastes. She said that while Bud Spencer "makes a classic genie right out of Baghdad", the younger costars was a "passable average kid."
