= How Funny Can Sex Be? =

1973 film by Dino Risi

How Funny Can Sex Be? (Sessomatto)
- Directed by: Dino Risi
- Written by: Ruggero Maccari; Dino Risi
- Produced by: Pio Angeletti; Adriano De Micheli
- Starring: Giancarlo Giannini; Laura Antonelli
- Cinematography: Alfio Contini
- Music by: Armando Trovajoli
- Release date: 1973
- Language: Italian
- Box office: $5 million (Italy)

Sessomatto ("Sex Mad"), internationally released as How Funny Can Sex Be?, is a 1973 Italian anthology erotic comedy film directed by Dino Risi. All the segments have sex and sexual perversions as their main theme.

The film was a commercial success grossing $5 million in Italy. It received an American release beginning in the fall of 1976, mounted by Funny Property Associates, a consortium consisting of Bob Lipman and Art Fisher of Lipman Advertising, attorney Leon Greenberg, and breeding farm owner Mort Finder; it was released to theatres in both subtitled and dubbed versions.

== Plot ==
Eight o'clock, Madam ('Signora sono le 8')

A butler has difficulty waking the lady of the house at the appointed times she has asked him.

Love in a Shanty ('Due cuori e una baracca')

Two slum spouses suspect that they are cheating on each other and therefore, every time he comes home, they beat each other. Then in a short time they make peace and have sex, excited by the quarrel and beatings.

It's never too late ('Non è mai troppo tardi')

Enrico, a lawyer married to a beautiful young woman, actually has a gerontophile passion for women over seventy and covets one in particular, Esperia.

Honeymoon ('Viaggio di nozze')

Two newlyweds, she from Veneto and him from Romagna, go on their honeymoon to Venice, but, although he appears to be an extremely fiery man, he therefore fails to consummate the marriage. The wife discovers that her husband can only have sex on moving means of transport, and so they will do it for the first time in the elevator of their apartment building.

Where There's a Will ('Torna piccina mia')

A man left by his wife asks a young and beautiful prostitute to dress up like her, making herself appear fat and unattractive, then has her read a script where she says she has left her new lover to come back to him. (This episode was cut from the American release.)

Wild Gooseberries aka Clinic Connection ('Lavoratore italiano all'estero')

An Italian who has emigrated to Denmark works as a sperm donor. One day he masturbates thinking about the beautiful nun in the hospital. The episode is performed in Danish, without subtitles.

The Vendetta ('La vendetta')

In Collesano, Sicily, a powerful local mafia boss, don Alvaro Macaluso, entertains a young and beautiful widow of a man he previously killed over a dispute, unaware she intends to use her wiles against him.

A Difficult Case ('Un amore difficile')

Saturnino, a young Apulian who has just arrived in Milan in search of his brother Cosimo, falls in love with Gilda, a charming Milanese lady, who ends up delivering several surprises to the naive country visitor.

The House Guest ('L'ospite')

The beautiful wife of an industrialist tries to seduce a meek statistician invited to dinner.

== Cast ==
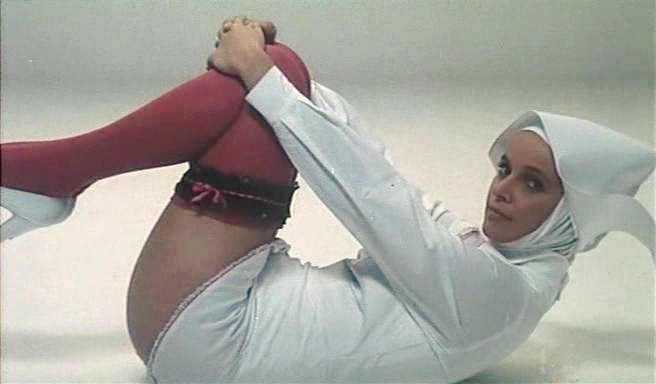
Antonelli as "The Nun" in the film

- Giancarlo Giannini: Domenico/Cesaretto/Enrico/Lello/Giansiro/The Donor/ Michele Maccò/Saturnino/Dottor Bianchi
- Laura Antonelli: Madame Juliette/Celestina/Enrico's Wife/Grazia/Tamara/ The Nun/Donna Mimma Maccò/Tiziana
- Paola Borboni: Esperia
- Alberto Lionello: Cosimo/Gilda
- Duilio Del Prete: Vittorio
- Carla Mancini: Maid

== See also ==
- List of Italian films of 1973
