= The Big Family =

- Directed by: Tonino Ricci
- Written by: Nino Scolaro; Tonino Ricci; Arpad DeRiso
- Starring: Raymond Pellegrin
- Cinematography: Giovanni Bergamini
- Music by: Bruno Nicolai
- Distributed by: Variety Distribution
- Release date: 1973
- Language: Italian

The Big Family (Italian: L'onorata famiglia - Uccidere è cosa nostra) is a 1973 Italian mafia film written and directed by Tonino Ricci and starring Raymond Pellegrin, Simonetta Stefanelli and Richard Conte.

== Cast ==
- Raymond Pellegrin as Don Peppino Scalise
- Simonetta Stefanelli as Signora Vitale
- Giancarlo Prete as Inspector La Manna
- Richard Conte as Don Antonio Marchesi
- Maria Fiore as Miss Federici
- Edmund Purdom as Giovanni Lutture
- Aldo Barberito as Federici
- Pino Ferrara as Fiorito
- Sal Borgese as Turi
- Stelio Candelli as Johnny DeSalvo
- Umberto Spadaro as Carabinieri Marshall
- Franco Fantasia as Chief of Police
- Empedocle Buzzanca as Alfio Sorge
