= Stelio Candelli =

Italian actor (1931–2017)

- Born: 28 March 1931; Trieste, Kingdom of Italy
- Died: 14 March 2017 (aged 85); Rome, Italy
- Occupation: Actor
- Years active: 1958–2005

Stelio Candelli (28 March 1931 – 14 April 2017) was an Italian actor known for his appearance in Spaghetti western films.

== Life and career ==
Born in Trieste, the son of civil servants, in 1954 Candelli enrolled at the Accademia d'Arte Drammatica in Rome, graduating in 1957. The same year he made his film debut in Alberto Lattuada's Guendalina.

During the 1960s and 1970s Candelli played main roles in numerous genre films, often credited as Stanley Kent.

He was also active on stage and on television, and is best remembered for his role as Danny Scipio, a former Mafia member turned crime investigator, in the BBC TV series Vendetta (1966-68).

Candell died on 14 March 2017, at the age of 85.

== Filmography ==
Year	Title	Role	Notes
1957	The Dragon's Blood		
1959	The Nights of Lucretia Borgia	Raffaello	
1959	The Black Archer		
1960	La sceriffa	Bruno Carotenuto	
1961	The Last of the Vikings	Viking	Uncredited
1962	War Gods of Babylon	Ammurabi	
1964	Triumph of the Ten Gladiators	Glauco Marcio	
1965	The Last Tomahawk	Roger	Uncredited
1965	Planet of the Vampires	Brad / Mud	
1965	Secret Agent 777	Dr. Dexter	
1965	Perché uccidi ancora	Teniente	
1966	Suicide Mission to Singapore	Kurt Jackson	
1970	Apocalypse Joe	Braddox	
1971	Drummer of Vengeance	Deputy Miller	
1971	W Django!	Jeff	
1972	Trinità e Sartana figli di...	Burton	
1972	Al tropico del cancro	Garner	
1972	Life Is Tough, Eh Providence?	Col. Arthur James	
1972	Alleluja & Sartana are Sons... Sons of God	Falco	
1972	La morte scende leggera	Giorgio Darica	
1973	The Big Family	Johnny De Salvo	
1973	Le complot		
1973	The Bloody Hands of the Law		
1974	La muerte llama a las 10	Ronald James	
1974	Nude for Satan	Dr. William Benson / Peter	
1975	Piange... il telefono		
1976	Special Cop in Action	Forestier	
1976	San sha ben tan xiao fu xing	Henz	
1976	Le due orfanelle	The Count	
1977	Clouzot & C. contro Borsalino & C.		
1977	Yeti: Giant of the 20th Century		
1977	Mr. Mean	Ranati	
1979	From Hell to Victory		Uncredited
1980	Orinoco: Prigioniere del sesso	Orinoco	
1980	La Cage aux Folles II	Hans	
1983	The Scarlet and the Black	O'Flaherty's Secretary	TV movie
1983	The Winds of War	Scarfaced Gestapo Agent	2 episodes
1983	Hercules	Father	
1984	Signore e signori		
1984	Rage - Fuoco incrociato	Slash	
1985	Demons	Frank	
1986	I giorni dell'inferno	Gen. Smith	
1986	The Messenger	Gariboldi	
1987	O Paradeisos anoigei me antikleidi	Giorgos	
1988	Night of the Sharks		
1988	Un maledetto soldato		
1992	Mean Tricks	John Mackenzie	
