= The Golden Ass (film) =

1970 film

- Directed by: Sergio Spina
- Written by: Carlos Saboga; Sergio Spina; Alfredo Tucci
- Based on: The Golden Ass by Lucius Apuleius
- Starring: Barbara Bouchet; Samy Pavel; John Steiner
- Cinematography: Angelo Lotti
- Edited by: Gianmaria Messeri
- Music by: Teo Usuelli
- Production companies: Filmes; ONCIC
- Distributed by: Titanus
- Release date: 27 August 1970
- Running time: 99 minutes
- Countries: Italy; Algeria
- Language: Italian

The Golden Ass (Italian: L'asino d'oro) is a 1970 Italian-Algerian historical comedy film directed by Sergio Spina and starring Barbara Bouchet, Samy Pavel and John Steiner. It is based on the novel The Golden Ass by Lucius Apuleius. It was shot at the Incir De Paolis Studios in Rome and on location in Algeria. The film's sets were designed by the art director Elena Poccetto Ricci. Bouchet appeared in several historical films before switching to gialli and sex comedies.

== Synopsis ==
In ancient Mauretania the Roman Lucio Apuleio and his friend Aristomene enjoy a series of adventures.

== Cast ==
- Barbara Bouchet as Pudentilla
- Samy Pavel as Lucio Apuleio
- John Steiner as Aristomene
- Dada Gallotti as Birrena
- Paolo Poli as Genesio
- Marisa Fabbri as Wizard
- Luigi Bonos as Husband of Birrena
- Enzo Fiermonte as Proconsul
- Lorenzo Piani as Lover of Birrena
- Leopoldo Trieste as Rufinio
- Steffen Zacharias as Milone
- Anna Zinnemann as Panfilia
- Angelo Casadei as Scribe

== Bibliography ==
- Elly, Derek. The Epic Film: Myth and History. Taylor & Francis, 2013.
- Lisanti, Tom & Paul, Louis. Film Fatales: Women in Espionage Films and Television, 1962–1973. McFarland, 2025.
