= Salt in the Wound =

1969 film

- Film poster
- Directed by: Tonino Ricci
- Written by: Piero Regnoli; Tonino Ricci
- Produced by: Tonino Ricci
- Starring: Klaus Kinski
- Cinematography: Sandro Mancori
- Music by: Riz Ortolani
- Release date: 10 August 1969
- Running time: 98 minutes
- Country: Italy
- Language: Italian

Salt in the Wound (Italian: Il dito nella piaga) is a 1969 Italian "macaroni combat" war film directed by Tonino Ricci and starring Klaus Kinski and George Hilton.

== Plot ==
Two condemned soldiers (Klaus Kinski and Ray Saunders) and their overseeing West Point officer (George Hilton) survive a German ambush on their way to execution. They make their way to a desolate Italian village which happens to be in the path of a German advance. While there they learn the meaning of self-sacrifice and courage when they become emotionally involved in the people and fortunes of the town and must defend the village from the invading German force.

== Cast ==
- George Hilton as Michael Sheppard
- Klaus Kinski as Cpl. Brian Haskins / Norman Carr
- Ray Saunders as Pvt. John Grayson / Calvin Mallory
- Betsy Bell as Daniela
- Ugo Adinolfi as American soldier
- Piero Mazzinghi as Priest
- Enrico Pagano as Mascetti
- Roberto Pagano as The Little Michele
- Giorgio De Giorgi as Captain
- Angelo Susani as Sergeant

== Releases ==
Wild East Productions released the film on a limited edition NTSC Region 0 DVD double feature with Churchill's Leopards in 2007.
