= Questo e Quello =

- Directed by: Sergio Corbucci
- Screenplay by: Bernardino Zapponi; Nino Manfredi; Renato Pozzetto
- Story by: Bernardino Zapponi; Nino Manfredi; Renato Pozzetto
- Starring: Bernardino Zapponi; Nino Manfredi
- Cinematography: Alessandro D'Eva
- Edited by: Amedeo Salfa
- Music by: Luciano Rossi; Gaio Chiocchio
- Production company: Faso Film
- Distributed by: C.I.D.I.F.
- Release date: 1983
- Running time: 102 minutes
- Country: Italy

Questo e Quello (lit. 'This and That') is a 1983 Italian comedy film directed by Sergio Corbucci.

== Plot ==
First segment: the life of a comic book artist in a creative crisis is revolutionised by the casual encounter with a beautiful stranger.

Second segment: a writer in his sixties goes in the spas of Montecatini in search of inspiration. The daughter of an old friend, a 20-year-old girl, will awake his senses.

== Cast ==
"This Impossible Love"

- Renato Pozzetto as Giulio Scacchi
- Janet Agren as Lucy / Lucilla
- Gianni Agus as the Editor
- Nino Manfredi: as the Doctor
- Michela Miti as Fianceè of Giulio

"In The Red Beret"

- Nino Manfredi as Sandro
- Desirée Becker as Daniela
- Sylva Koscina as Mother of Daniela
- Renato Pozzetto as Gregory
- Paolo Panelli as Doctor
- Nanda Primavera as Grandmother of Daniela
- Franco Scandurra as Prince

== Release ==
The film was released in 1983. The film was a box office hit in Italy on its release.

== Reception ==
In a retrospective review of the film, Roberto Curti found that Corbucci's direction was "sloppy and careless" and that the film was "basically an excuse for Pozzetto and Manfredi to do their comedy routine"

== See also ==
- List of Italian films of 1983
