= Bermuda: Cave of the Sharks =

1978 film

- English-language theatrical release poster
- Directed by: Tonino Ricci
- Written by: Fernando Galiana; Mauricio Melchiorre; Tonino Ricci
- Starring: Andrés García; Janet Agren
- Cinematography: Juan Jurado
- Music by: Stelvio Cipriani
- Release date: 1978
- Language: Spanish

Bermuda: Cave of the Sharks (Spanish: Bermudas: la cueva de los tiburones, Italian: Bermude: la fossa maledetta, also known as Cave of the Sharks and The Shark's Cave) is a 1978 Spanish-Italian-Mexican adventure-mystery film written and directed by Tonino Ricci and starring Andrés García and Janet Agren.

== Plot ==
Off the Coast of Santo Domingo is recovered Andrés, an experienced diver, who disappeared six months before with the crew of the vessel on which he was traveling. Lovingly assisted by his wife Angelica and his brother Richard, the young man restores his health but can not remember any detail that sheds light on the mystery of the six months of incredible survival.

== Cast ==
- Andrés García as Andres Montoya
- Janet Agren as Angelica
- Arthur Kennedy as Mr. Jackson
- Pino Colizzi as Enrique
- Máximo Valverde as Ricardo Montoya
- Cinzia Monreale as Girl In The Boat
- Adriana Falco as Girl In The Boat
- Nino Segurini as Doctor
