= Night of the Sharks =

1988 film

- Theatrical release poster
- Directed by: Tonino Ricci
- Written by: Tito Carpi; Tonino Ricci
- Produced by: Fulvio Lucisano; Nino Segurini
- Starring: Treat Williams; Antonio Fargas; Janet Agren; Christopher Connelly
- Cinematography: Giovanni Bergamini
- Edited by: Gianfranco Amicucci
- Music by: Stelvio Cipriani
- Distributed by: Amanecer Films; Belma Cinematografica; Cinematográfica Jalisco S.A. Koala Cinematografica
- Release date: 1 April 1988
- Running time: 90 minutes
- Countries: Italy; Spain; Mexico
- Languages: English; Spanish

Night of the Sharks (Italian: La notte degli squali) is a 1988 Italian-Spanish-Mexican film directed and co-written by Tonino Ricci. The film's story takes place in Miami, Florida and Cancún, Mexico, although it was filmed in the Dominican Republic. It was the last film by actor Christopher Connelly, who would die of lung cancer that same year.

== Plot ==
James Ziegler has spent five years of his life planning the perfect crime, bugging the communication devices of Rosentski, an influential and rich businessman. His dream finally comes through when he records a sensitive conversation between Rosentski and the President of the United States; so sensitive that he demands $2 million in diamonds from Rosentski for a disc of the recording. Rosentski decides to pay Ziegler for the disc but instead sends his enforcer to retrieve it. The enforcer tries to kill Ziegler but fails and Ziegler successfully escapes with the disc and the diamonds.

Ziegler goes to hide out with his brother David, who lives as a beach bum and shark hunter on the coast outside of Cancún. David lives with his friend and business partner Paco and has a seagoing neighbor, a man-eating shark named Cyclops. James Ziegler crash lands in a seaplane near David's shack. The plane explodes, while James survives just long enough to hand over the disc and the diamonds to David.

Rosentski is displeased with his enforcer's jumping the gun. He correctly surmises that James had gone to hide with his brother David and arranges a meeting with David's ex-wife, Liz. Rosentski promises he will pay off Liz's considerable business debts as well as reward her if she recovers the disc and diamonds. Rosentski's enforcer, however, wants the diamonds for himself and leads an assassination squad against David. David abhors firearms but has no objections to fighting back using bladed weapons, booby traps, molotov cocktails and his shark, Cyclops.

== Cast ==
- Treat Williams as David Ziegler
- Antonio Fargas as Paco
- Carlo Mucari as James Ziegler
- Janet Agren as Liz Ziegler
- John Steiner as Rosentski
- Stelio Candelli as Rosentski's Enforcer
- Nina Soldano as Juanita
- Salvatore Borghese as Garcia
- Christopher Connelly as Father Mattia

== Production ==
Filming took place in the Dominican Republic.
