= The Idol (1966 film) =

1966 British film by Daniel Petrie

- Directed by: Daniel Petrie
- Written by: Ugo Liberatore (story); Millard Lampell
- Produced by: Leonard Lightstone; Joseph E. Levine (executive producer); Robert Porter (associate producer)
- Starring: Michael Parks; Jennifer Jones
- Cinematography: Kenneth Higgins
- Edited by: Jack Slade
- Music by: John Dankworth
- Production company: Embassy Pictures
- Distributed by: Paramount Pictures
- Release date: 10 August 1966 (U.S.)
- Running time: 109 minutes
- Country: United Kingdom
- Language: English

The Idol is a 1966 British drama film directed by Daniel Petrie and starring Jennifer Jones, Michael Parks, Jennifer Hilary and Guy Doleman. It was written by Millard Lampell based on a story by Ugo Liberatore. Set during the Swinging Sixties in London, the plot entails a rebellious student who disrupts the lives of all around him, leading to disastrous consequences.

== Plot ==
Marco, a young, arrogant art student, is friendly with Timothy, a medical student, and Sarah, Timothy's girl friend. Timothy is dominated by his wealthy and beautiful mother, Carol, who is divorcing her husband. There is an Oedipal undercurrent between mother and son, and Timothy is not happy that Carol plans to marry again. Nevertheless, as Carol continues to control his life, Timothy wishes to be more independent.

Marco finds a studio apartment, and Timothy pays the first two months' rent, planning to move in with his friend and switch from medicine to art. An angry Carol prevents the move, and Sarah, who has fallen in love with Marco, moves in instead.

During a party at her weekend cottage, Carol becomes furious when she finds Marco and Sarah kissing in Timothy's room, and she orders Marco from the house. Later, Timothy is involved in a pub brawl, and Marco defends him and brings him home unconscious. Carol is appreciative, and warms to him. Later at a bar, Marco and Carol dance, and it is clear the repressed Carol is attracted to him. Timothy looks on, uneasily.

On New Year's Eve, Marco arrives at Carol's house to accompany Timothy to a party. But Timothy had already left, and Marco is left alone with Carol. He seduces her, then scorns her in retaliation for his earlier humiliation at the cottage. He leaves for the party which is on a boat, and arrives drunk accompanied by a streetwalker. He hints broadly to Sarah of his conquest of Carol, which Timothy overhears. Anguished, Timothy runs up on deck and Marco stumbles after him. Timothy violently thrusts him away, but a woozy Marco falls into the water and drowns, despite Timothy's efforts to save him. Questioned by the police, Timothy refuses to reveal the cause of the fight. Thus, without his admitting to the actual provocation, it is determined that Marco drowned at Timothy's instigation. Carol, who has arrived during the questioning, reaches out to Timothy as he is being led away by the police, but he coldly turns away.

== Cast ==
- Jennifer Jones as Carol
- Michael Parks as Marco
- John Leyton as Timothy
- Jennifer Hilary as Sarah
- Guy Doleman as Martin Livesey
- Natasha Pyne as Rosalind
- Jack Watson as Police Inspector
- Jeremy Bulloch as Lewis
- Gordon Gostelow as Simon
- Priscilla Morgan as Rosie
- Edna Morris as Mrs. Muller
- Fanny Carby as barmaid
- Renée Houston as 1st woman at party
- Caroline Blakiston as 2nd woman at party

== Production ==
Carlo Ponti originally sent Jennifer Jones a script written by Ugo Liberatore suggesting she appear in it alongside her son Robert Walker Jr, playing mother and son. However Jones was reluctant to play the mother of her own son and declined. Joseph E. Levine acquired the script, had it rewritten by an English writer and signed Kim Stanley to star. Three days before filming was to begin Stanley fell ill; the producers offered the role to Jones who accepted.

This was the first film Jones made after her husband David O. Selznick died the previous year. It was mostly shot in London.

== Music ==
The soundtrack by John Dankworth includes "The Idol," "Empty Arms and Empty Heart" and"The Party". During the seduction scene, Marco plays a record of Vivaldi's "Winter" from The Four Seasons.

== Critical reception ==
The Monthly Film Bulletin wrote: "Gloomy psychological melodrama with meaningful undertones attached to a banal and superficial script which leaves many problems unsolved. The mother-son relationship, for example, is never explored in any detail, although it is central to the film. Nor does the script allow the cast much opportunity to be convincing since characterisation seems to be motivated solely by the plot. The London locations are indifferently shot, and even John Dankworth's music fails to enliven the proceedings."

Kine Weekly wrote: "This is a story of almost unrelieved gloom surrounding mostly unpleasant people, but its preoccupation with sex is sure to earn an audience. Seamy attraction."

Boxoffice wrote: "Audiences who dote on sex-saturated screen fare will get their money's worth from The Idol, for Daniel Petrie's direction leaves nothing to the imagination, except total nudity, during the older woman's seduction – a scene that is bound to create an uproar of criticism from morally minded members of the community. Black and white photography by Ken Higgins is excellent and John Dankworth's sombre musical score matches the mood of the Leonard Lightstone production."

Variety wrote: "The Leonard Lightstone production is burdened with frequent static in its development of characters and a rambling narrative further reduces dramatic impact. ... Lightstone has given impressive physical backing to his production, capturing the feeling of London, which Ken Higgins limns in his sensitive photography, but characters lack much interest."

Leslie Halliwell said: "Stupefyingly boring generation gap sex drama."
