= Cross Current =

- Directed by: Tonino Ricci
- Written by: Rafael Azcona; Aldo Crudo; Arpad DeRiso; José María Forqué; Tonino Ricci
- Produced by: Roberto Bessi
- Starring: Philippe Leroy; Elga Andersen; Rossana Yanni; Ivan Rassimov
- Cinematography: Cecilio Paniagua
- Edited by: Amedeo Giomini
- Music by: Giorgio Gaslini
- Release date: 1971
- Running time: 90 minutes

Cross Current (Italian: Un omicidio perfetto a termine di legge/ A Perfect Murder According to Law), (Spanish: Homicidio al límite de la ley), is a 1971 Italian-Spanish giallo film directed by Tonino Ricci, starring Ivan Rassimov and Rosanna Yanni. The film's original working title was Il buio nel cervello (A Darkness in the Brain)

== Plot ==
A wealthy speedboat racer named Marco suffers a boat accident and must get brain surgery, after which he loses his memory and is cared for by his wife Monica, his business partner Tommy, and a young girl named Terry. Marco develops a relationship with Terry, which infuriates his wife. Murders begin occurring around the estate. Monica gets shot dead while fighting with Terry, and Terry talks Marco into disposing of Monica's body at sea. His partner Tommy and the estate's gardener are murdered next, then the gardener's mother. Later, Marco's dead wife Monica reappears from the dead, and Marco drives his car off a cliff in a panic. The whole thing appears to have been a plot between Monica and Marco's other partner (Burt) to get rid of Marco, but when Monica realizes that Terry and Burt are lovers, she shoots them both dead. But Monica, now alone, becomes the prey of a stalking killer wearing black gloves.

== Cast ==
- Philippe Leroy as Marco Breda
- Elga Andersen as Monica Breda
- Ivan Rassimov as Burt
- Rosanna Yanni as Terry Povani
- Franco Ressel as Tommy Brown
- Rina Franchetti as Anna
- Julio Peña as Inspector Baldini
- Franco Fantasia as Professor Mauri
- Liana Del Balzo as Mother of Sante
