= Bali (1970 film) =

1970 film

- Directed by: Ugo Liberatore
- Screenplay by: Fulvio Gicca Palli; Pier Giuseppe Murgia; Ottavio Alessi; Ugo Liberatore
- Story by: Fulvio Gicca Palli; Pier Giuseppe Murgia; Ottavio Alessi; Ugo Liberatore
- Cinematography: Angelo Lotti; Roberto D'Ettore Piazzoli
- Edited by: Giancarlo Cappelli
- Music by: Giorgio Gaslini
- Production companies: Gerico Sound; Roxy Film
- Distributed by: C.I.D.I.F.
- Release date: 29 December 1970 (Italy)
- Countries: Italy; West Germany

Bali is a 1970 Italian romance film directed by Ugo Liberatore and Paolo Heusch.

== Cast ==
- John Steiner: Glenn
- Laura Antonelli: Daria
- Umberto Orsini: Carlo
- Petra Pauly: Brigitte
- Johannes Schaaf: Bradford
- Ettore Manni: Inspector (1975 version)
- Ilona Staller: Victim (1975 version)

== Release ==
Bali was distributed by C.I.D.I.F. on 29 December 1970 in Italy. Originally directed by Ugo Liberatore and released as Incontro d'amore a Bali, it was a box office bomb. In 1975, following a series of commercial successes of Laura Antonelli, whose in the meanwhile had established herself as one of the most popular Italian sex symbols, the producer Alfredo Bini released a new version of the film, with a new editing and with the introduction of new scenes shot by Paolo Heusch with actors Ettore Manni and Ilona Staller. Released as Incontro d'amore, the film eventually got a large success at the Italian box office, grossing about 1 billion and a half lire.

== See also ==
- List of Italian films of 1970
