= May Morning (film) =

- Directed by: Ugo Liberatore
- Written by: Ugo Liberatore; George Crowther; Fulvio Gicca Palli
- Starring: Jane Birkin
- Cinematography: Angelo Lotti
- Edited by: Franco Fraticelli
- Music by: Armando Trovajoli
- Release date: 1970
- Language: English

May Morning (Italian: Alba pagana) is a 1970 Italian thriller-drama film co-written and directed by Ugo Liberatore.

== Plot ==
Three young students have different experiences (including sexual) at Oxford University in England.

== Cast ==
- Jane Birkin as Flora Finlake
- Alessio Orano as Valerio Montelli
- John Steiner as Rodrick Rodney Stanton
- Rossella Falk as Mrs. Finlake
- Micaela Pignatelli as Amanda
- Ian Sinclair as Professor Finlake

== See also ==
- List of Italian films of 1970
