= Kenneth Higgins =

British cinematographer (1919–2008)

- Born: 26 December 1919; London, England, UK
- Died: 22 January 2008 (aged 88); Isle of Wight, England, UK
- Other names: K. Higgins; Ken Higgins; Ken Phipps
- Occupation: Cinematographer
- Years active: 1948–1982

Kenneth Higgins (26 December 1919 – 22 January 2008) was a British cinematographer who worked on both television and film.

He was nominated at the 39th Academy Awards for Best Cinematography-Black and White for his work on the film Georgy Girl.

== Selected filmography ==
- The Infamous John Friend (1959)
- Terminus (1961)
- French Dressing (1964)
- Swinger's Paradise
- Darling (1965)
- Up Jumped a Swagman (1965)
- Georgy Girl (1966)
- The Idol (1966)
- The Spy with a Cold Nose (1966)
- Cop-Out (1967)
- Hot Millions (1968)
- Salt and Pepper (1968)
- Midas Run (1969)
- The Virgin Soldiers (1969)
- Julius Caesar (1970)
- You Can't Win 'Em All (1970)
- Lady Chatterly Versus Fanny Hill (1971)
- I'm Not Feeling Myself Tonight (1976)
- Golden Rendezvous (1977)
- The Strange Case of the End of Civilization as We Know It (1977)
