= Silvano Ippoliti =

Italian cinematographer

Silvano Ippoliti (24 January 1922 – 1994) was an Italian cinematographer.

Born in Cagli, Ippoliti entered the cinema industry thanks to his sister Iria, employed at Cinecittà, who introduced him to Anchise Brizzi, at the time the chief of the operators department. He began working as a camera operator in 1949 for the Raffaello Matarazzo's film Catene, then held this role for over a decade. He made his debut as a cinematographer in the early sixties and in 1967 he worked for the first time with Tinto Brass in the film Col cuore in gola; it was the beginning of a long professional relationship that lasted for twenty-five years, both in the fields of cinema and advertising, until the 1992 film All Ladies Do It. His credits include also films directed by Giuliano Montaldo, Luigi Magni, Jacques Deray, Carlo Lizzani, Sergio Corbucci, Pasquale Festa Campanile, Lucio Fulci, Riccardo Freda and Emidio Greco.

== Partial filmography ==
Cinematography credits
Year	Title	Director	Notes
1966	Star Pilot	Pietro Francisci	
1966	Navajo Joe	Sergio Corbucci	
1967	Col cuore in gola	Tinto Brass	
1967	Satanik	Piero Vivarelli	
1968	The Great Silence	Sergio Corbucci	
1971	The Iguana with the Tongue of Fire	Riccardo Freda	
1972	The Outside Man	Jacques Deray	
1973	Tony Arzenta	Duccio Tessari	
1973	Flatfoot	Steno	
1974	Challenge to White Fang	Lucio Fulci	
1976	Salon Kitty	Tinto Brass	
1977	Le Gang	Jacques Deray	
1979	Caligula	Tinto Brass	
1980	Super Fuzz	Sergio Corbucci	
1981	Bollenti spiriti	Giorgio Capitani	
1983	The Seven Magnificent Gladiators	Bruno Mattei	
1986	Aladdin	Bruno Corbucci	
1987	Specters	Marcello Avallone	
