= Occhio, malocchio, prezzemolo e finocchio =

- Directed by: Sergio Martino
- Written by: Franco Bucceri; Romolo Guerrieri; Roberto Leoni; Franco Verrucci; Mario Amendola; Bruno Corbucci
- Starring: Johnny Dorelli; Lino Banfi
- Cinematography: Giancarlo Ferrando
- Music by: Guido & Maurizio De Angelis
- Release date: 1983
- Language: Italian

Occhio, malocchio, prezzemolo e finocchio (Italian for "Eye, evil eye, parsley and fennel", also known as Evil Eye) is a 1983 Italian comedy film directed by Sergio Martino. The film consists in two episodes spoofing superstition and magic, respectively starring Lino Banfi and Johnny Dorelli.

== Plot ==
The film is divided into two episodes, The Hair of Disgrace and The Magician, both focusing on the theme of the occult. The protagonists of the two episodes are respectively Lino Banfi and Johnny Dorelli.

=== The Hair of Disgrace ===
Altomare Secca owns an appliance store and has a number of problems, both family and work. He feels alone, given that his wife Giovanna has eyes only for soap operas and her daughter Mariella thinks only of her boyfriend Carluccio, whom Altomare deeply hates. Corinto Marchialla arrives one day. Altomare, who is very superstitious, undergoes a series of unfortunate events and comes to the conclusion that Marchialla is the source of all his misfortunes.

His wife Giovanna advises him to turn to a magician, the King of the occult, who reveals the way to neutralize the bad luck: eradicating a "bristly and silky hair" from the neighbor, which is the cause of bad luck. Altomare then invites his neighbors to dinner by putting sleeping pills in the wine and so Marchialla falls asleep while Carluccio puts a stimulant in his wife Ludovica's drink. Altomare accompanies Marchialla to his apartment pretending to want to put him to sleep, but Ludovica Marchialla disturbs him because she has an interest in him that forces Altomare to try to remove her in every way.

Altomare Marchialla shaves in every part of the body; while he is at work, Helen, his mistress, breaks in and puts an end to their relationship as she becomes convinced that Altomare is homosexual. The next morning, Altomare and Giovanna, convinced that they have freed themselves from the evil eye, toast, but the shop assistant warns him that during the night the thieves have completely cleaned up his shop.

Just then Marchialla reveals that he has a "hair, bristly and silky" that always grows back on his eyebrow: Altomare catches the ball and tries to tear his hair out but looking too far he falls from the balcony from the fifth floor; luckily a truck cushions the fall because in falling Altomare manages to tear the hair and break the evil eye.

=== The Magician ===
Gaspare Canestrari known as "Le Grand Gaspar" is a low-level illusionist who tries to become famous. His living conditions are not the best, so much so that he is forced to live at the house of his wife Iole and her brother Alberigo, who somehow manage to keep him. After having made a disastrous show, his agent, the knight Aldrovandi, definitively discharges him, inviting him to change his profession. One day, Gaspare meets the Marquise Del Querceto, an elderly witch of 318 years, who gives him her supernatural powers; in exchange Gaspare will have to bring her a pistachio ice cream cone before her death, otherwise her powers will vanish.

Thanks to the witch's powers, "Le grand Gaspar" quickly becomes an authentic phenomenon of magic. He is called to a village where it hasn't rained for a long time and they ask him to make it rain only on their land, the magician accepts but if he makes a mistake he will have to be paid by Bastiano, not exactly affectionate towards him. After a small initial misunderstanding, Gaspar reads the marquise's libretto and manages to make it rain. After learning of his new powers, the knight Aldrovandi calls Gaspar and after an initial refusal after having always treated him badly he accepts to work with him again.

Aldrovandi manages to snatch a yes from the Magician Silvan to challenge Gaspar but at the very best the powers vanish as the letter from the Marquise to bring her pistachio ice cream arrived late and therefore the Marquise died. Gaspar in a panic tries to withdraw from the race but Aldrovandi convinces him not to give up and so his first number (guessing the data of a license blindfolded) went well with the help of his brother-in-law Alberigo who communicates the data to him via a radio . After Silvan's number, which makes a girl levitate in the air, Gaspar tries the number of the box with the knives and invites Aldrovandi to participate, but the performance turns out to be a flop and after a fight, Silvan makes them friends again.

== Cast ==
Segment Il pelo della disgrazia (The Hair of Disgrace)

- Lino Banfi as Altomare Secca
- Milena Vukotic as Giovanna Secca
- Janet Agren as Helen
- Mario Scaccia as Corinto Marchialla
- Dagmar Lassander as Ludovica Marchialla
- Gegia as Mariella Secca
- Elisa Kadigia Bove as Jenny
- Franco Javarone as King of Occult

Segment Il mago (The Magician)

- Johnny Dorelli as Gaspar the Magician
- Adriana Russo as Iole
- Paola Borboni as Marquise Del Querceto
- Mario Brega as Alberigo
- Renzo Montagnani as Aldovrandi
- Silvan as Himself
- Ugo Bologna as Raggiotti
- Anna Kanakis as Customer

== See also ==
- List of Italian films of 1983
