= Duilio Del Prete =

Italian actor and singer-songwriter (1938–1998)

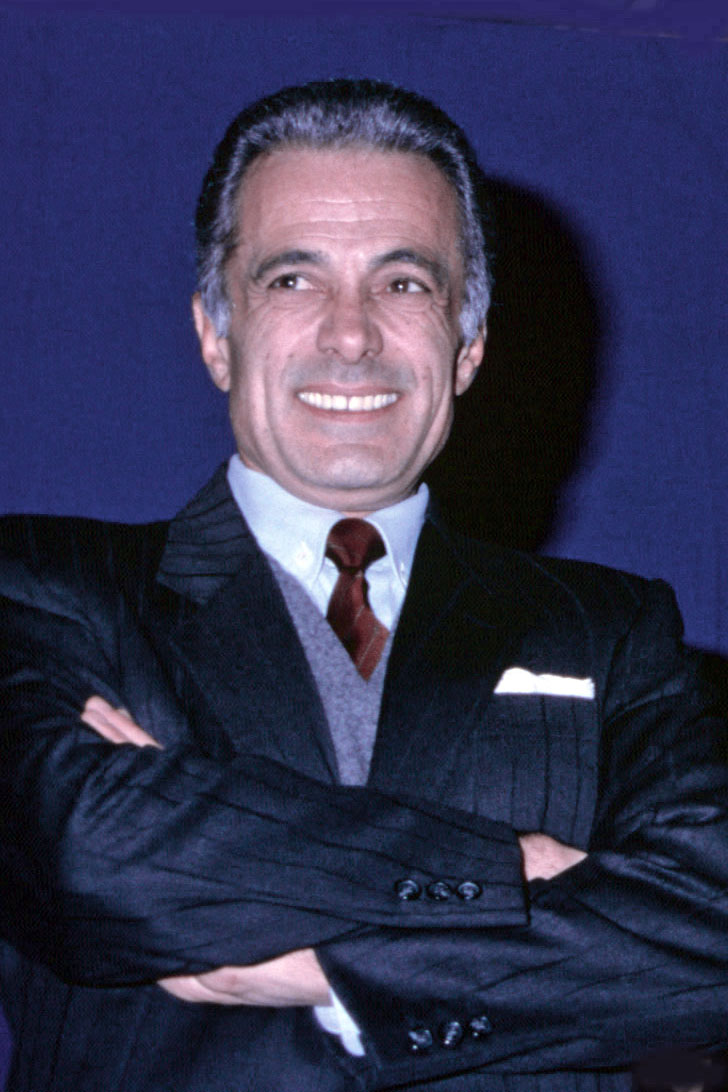
- Del Prete in 1983
- Born: 25 June 1938; Cuneo, Italy
- Died: 2 February 1998 (aged 59); Rome, Italy
- Occupations: Actor; singer-songwriter
- Years active: 1963–1998

Duilio Del Prete (25 June 1938 – 2 February 1998) was an Italian actor and singer-songwriter. He appeared in numerous Italian films, and was also known for his roles in two English-language American films directed by Peter Bogdanovich, Daisy Miller (1974) and the musical At Long Last Love (1975).

As a singer-songwriter, he wrote political songs and recorded an album of Jacques Brel's covers; he also wrote songs for several artists.

== Early life ==
Del Prete was born in Cuneo, Piedmont, Italy on 25 June 1938, the son of toy merchants Celestina and Cesare Del Prete. He had a sister, Cristiana. After graduating high school, Del Prete resided abroad in London, Berlin, and Paris.

== Career ==
In Paris in the 1950s, Del Prete befriended Belgian singer Jacques Brel, writing songs for the singer as well as recording an album of cover tracks.

As an actor, Del Prete appeared in several films of the commedia all'italiana, including Alfredo, Alfredo (1972) and My Friends (1975), both by Pietro Germi, and How Funny Can Sex Be? (1975). He also played in several foreign films, including two for American director Peter Bogdanovich, the drama Daisy Miller (1974) and the jukebox musical At Long Last Love (1975). He also had a supporting role in the English-language historical thriller The Assassination of Trotsky (1972), directed by Joseph Losey.

In his later career, Del Prete appeared in several thriller films, including Dagger Eyes (1983) and Days of Inspector Ambrosio (1988), as well as starring in a lead role in Lucio Fulci's supernatural horror film Voices from Beyond (1991).

== Death ==
Del Prete died of cancer in Rome in 1998. He is interred at the Cimitero di San Rocco Castagnaretta in his hometown of Cumeo.

== Filmography ==
Year	Title	Role	Notes	Ref.
1968	The Seven Cervi Brothers	Dante Castellucci		
1968	Commandos	Bruno		
1971	Tribuna Padronale	Palazzinaro immaginario		
1972	The Assassination of Trotsky	Felipe		
1972	Alfredo Alfredo	Oreste		
1972	Il caso Pisciotta	Agent Sciurti		
1972	D'amore si muore			
1973	The Nun and the Devil	Pietro		
1973	Redneck	Captain Lenzi		
1973	We Want the Colonels	Monsignor Giampaolino Sartorello		
1973	Number One			
1973	High Crime	Umberto Griva		
1973	Massacre in Rome	Partisan		
1973	How Funny Can Sex Be?	Vittorio ("L'ospite")		
1974	The Devil Is a Woman	Monsignor Salvi		
1974	Daisy Miller	Mr. Giovanelli		
1974	Pianeta Venere			
1975	At Long Last Love	Johnny Spanish		
1975	My Friends	Guido Necchi		
1975	The Divine Nymph	Armellini		
1975	The Sensuous Nurse	Benito Varotto		
1976	L'Italia s'è rotta	Il censore		
1977	Stato interessante	Federico		
1977	A Spiral of Mist	Marcello Testa		
1979	Io zombo, tu zombi, lei zomba	Zombie		
1979	Nella misura in cui...			
1979	L'imbranato	Maranotti		
1980	Augh! Augh!	Conte Giorgio Corsini		
1981	On n'est pas des anges... elles non-plus	Vittorio		
1982	Le Cadeau	Umberto		
1983	Dagger Eyes	Captain Levi		
1987	Cronaca nera	Carlo Gironda	Television film	
1988	Days of Inspector Ambrosio	Francesco Borghi		
1989	Ti ho incontrata domani	L'amico di Primo		
1989	A proposito di quella strana ragazza	Giovanna's father		
1990	Panama Sugar	Blue Ball		
1991	Voices from Beyond	Giorgio Mainardi		
1995	Mi manca Marcella	Conrado		
1995	Altrove	Commissario Tirelli		
1997	Auguri professore	Headmaster		

== Accolades ==
Award/association	Year	Category	Nominated work	Result	Ref.
Globo d'oro	1975	Best Breakthrough Actor	My Friends	Won	
Nastro d'Argento	1975	Best Supporting Actor	My Friends	Nominated	
