= Challenge to White Fang =

1974 film directed by Lucio Fulci

- Italian film poster
- Directed by: Lucio Fulci
- Screenplay by: Roberto Silvestri; Roberto Gianviti; Lucio Fulci
- Story by: Roberto Silvestri; Roberto Gianviti
- Starring: Franco Nero; Virna Lisi; John Steiner; Renato Cestiè
- Cinematography: Silvano Ippoliti
- Edited by: Ornella Micheli
- Music by: Carlo Rustichelli
- Production companies: Coralta Produzioni Internazionali Cinematografica S.r.l.; Les Films Corona; Terra-Filmkunst GmbH
- Distributed by: Titanus (Italy); Constantin Film (West Germany)
- Release dates: October 31, 1974 (Rome & Bari)
- Running time: 100 minutes
- Countries: Italy; West Germany; France

Challenge to White Fang (Italian: Il ritorno di Zanna Bianca, lit. 'The Return of White Fang') is a 1974 film directed by Lucio Fulci. It is a sequel to Fulci's White Fang (1973), as part of a trend of European Northern films that followed the success of Call of the Wild (1972).

== Plot ==
Set in the Yukon, Canada in 1899 around three years after the conclusion of the previous film, Mitsah (the young boy from the first White Fang movie), is now a pre-teenager working with his wolf-dog and two fur traders when Beauty Smith and two henchmen appear and raid the traders camp shooting and killing all of them, including Mitsah, and escapes in a canoe with all their equipment. Several hours later, the wolf-dog is found by John Tarwater a grizzled old trader who buries the dead Mitsah, and takes the hound back to a nearby town which is his home. The wolf-dog befriends another young boy who is John's orphaned, 10-year-old grandson Bill Tarwater (Renato Cestle). After looking for a name, Bill gives White Fang his name by yet again from the beasts ivory-white teeth. At a local saloon, White Fang helps John Tarwater win some money at a card game from a crooked card-shark, and a fistfight breaks out between the swindler and his victims as John casually counts his money, while White Fang and Bill take cover behind the bar. John then embarks on one of his periodic expeditions to discover gold.

Meanwhile, Beauty Smith is alive and well, and again exploiting the people of the very town where John and Bill live. Smith lives under the alias 'Charles Forth', a local businessman, and fakes a crippling injury by confining himself to a wheelchair with his two henchman always at his side. Sister Evangelina (Virna Lisi) is now running a new mission hut in the town to convert into a hospital. She decides to ask 'Mr. Forth' for funding to operate her hospital despite warnings from the townsmen that 'Mr. Forth' is a businessman and won't give her any money unless she gives him assurances that she will repay the loan, with interest, within 60 days or less. Sister Evangelina nevertheless goes to meet with him, and she recognizes the villainous man immediately.

Sister Evangelina contacts novelist Jason Scott who's on a book tour down south and agrees to come to her assistance. Scott also meets with his old friend Kurt Johnson, now working as a mines inspector to help out. Together, the three of them take their accusations to the town's police chief, Inspector Leclerq, who is actually on the payroll of Beauty Smith and he claims to have known the crippled 'Mr. Forth' for six years. Leclerq's wife Jane, is pressuring her husband to accommodate Smith's nefarious plans in return for more bribe money he gives them in exchange for protection.

Jason Scott attempts to expose the illegal complicity between 'Mr. Forth' and the Inspector with the help of a local worker named Liverpool, who agrees to write a statement in exchange for money. But Liverpool goes back on his word to help Scott by skipping down with the money that was given to him. Shortly afterwards, Scott encounters Bill and John Tarwater when White Fang drags them back to town after their sled dogs had run away leaving them stranded on a snowy plain. The animal shows both affection for both Bill and Scott having remembered the latter from their previous adventure in Dawson City three years earlier. Elsewhere, Kurt meets Liverpool's younger and attractive sister and a romantic attraction develops between both of them.

The following day, Liverpool shamefacedly returns to the town having found two men, one dead and the other terribly ill from frostbite, who have been sold insufficient and overpriced supplies from Beauty Smith. The survivor, named Carter, has gangrene in both legs and Scott has to help Sister Evangelina perform the amputation at the mission hut. When Beauty Smith and his henchmen see and recognize White Fang, they frame the wolf-dog for savaging Liverpool to death. An enraged posse attempts to kill White Fang, forcing Bill to drive the beast out of town.

The next day, when Bill looks for White Fang in the woods, he gets attacked by a vicious eagle, but White Fang jumps in and saves him by fighting off the eagle. Bill smuggles White Fang back into town and to Sister Evangelina's mission where the wolf-dog's injuries are tended. While visiting his grandson and his hound at the mission, John learns from Carter about the location of a gold-stream in the mountains that he found. But Harvey, a mission employee and a secret associate of Beauty Smith, sees them discussing the location and reports it to his boss. Jane then fakes a sickness to lure Sister Evangelina away from the mission, leaving Carter alone in his sickbed. Beauty Smith (no longer pretending to be crippled) pays a visit and tortures Carter for the location of the gold stream. Smith then kidnaps John Tarwater and has his two henchmen set fire to the mission hut. Carter is burned to death, while Bill, who walked in while Smith was torturing Carter, is trapped by the flames. When Sister Evangelina realizes that Jane is not sick, she races back to the burning mission and rushes in saving Bill, but gets caught on fire and dies from the severity of her burns.

Hearing of her death, the townspeople start a riot after learning from Bill about the wanted Beauty Smith and of Inspector Leclerq's association with him. As the mob breaks through the Mounties into the police station, Leclerq shoots himself. Scott, Kurt, and Bill find Jane where she tells them where Beauty Smith is heading. Scott and Kurt, with White Fang in tow, organize a posse to give chase. Locating Smith and his henchmen, Scott leads the posse forward and a gun battle develops. Smith manages to shoot a few posse members, while his two henchmen are killed. White Fang catches up to Smith and attacks him. Smith's gunshots miss the beast and instead triggers an avalanche. The villain finally dies as he gets crushed to death under the falling snow and ice. Shortly afterwards, Scott, Kurt, and White Fang locate John Tarwater who was shot and left for dead. But before he dies, he asks Scott that his grandson be the beneficiary of the gold stream that he found right near him with Carter's advice. The two-faced Harvey suddenly shows his true colors and says that the owner will legally be the first one to register the claim in the town. He suggests a dog-sled race to settle the disputed claim.

In the climatic sled race, Harvey attempts dirty tricks to win the race, but the tables turn on him when he falls from his sled and dies when he gets accidentally run over by the sled-team headed by White Fang. Scott and White Fang arrive in the town first, and the writer enters Bill Tarwater's name in the ledger in place of his own.

In the final scene, Jason Scott says his goodbyes to Kurt who will be staying in the town having gotten the job as the new police inspector, and he announces that he and Liverpool's sister will be getting married in the spring. Bill also stays to live with Kurt and his wife who have agreed to raise the boy and White Fang. Scott then returns to Vancouver with new stories to write, while White Fang is torn between running after him or staying with Bill. However, the wolf-dog chooses to stay with his young master as he runs back to Bill.

== Cast ==
- Franco Nero as Jason Scott
- Virna Lisi as Sister Evangelina
- John Steiner as Charles 'Beauty' Smith
- Raimund Harmstorf as Kurt Jansen
- Yanti Somer as Liverpool's Sister
- Harry Carey Jr. as John Tarwater
- Renato Cestiè as Bill Tarwater
- Werner Pochath as Harvey
- Hannelore Elsner as Jane LeClerq
- Renato De Carmine as Lt. Charles LeClerq
- John Bartha as Mountie
- Missaele as Mitsah

== Production ==
Following the high box office returns of White Fang (1973), producer Giulio Sbarigia conceived a follow-up with director Lucio Fulci returning to direct. Actors Franco Nero, Virna Lisi and John Steiner from the earlier film returned from the first film in Challenge to White Fang. The lead role of young Bill Tarwater was created because the father of the young girl who played Mitsah in the first film would not let her star in a second film. As a result, Mitsah is killed at the beginning and child star Renato Cestiè then takes over as the protagonist.

Challenge to White Fang was an Italian-West German-French international co-production between the Rome-based Coralta Cinematografica S.r.l, the Paris based Les Films Corona, and the Berlin-based Terra Filmkunst. It was shot from April to May 1974. Scenes shot in Canada were shot by Aristide Massaccesi.

== Release ==
Challenge to White Fang was released in Italy on October 31, 1974 in Rome and Bari. It was released theatrically in the United States and Australia as Chellenge to White Fang. It was screened in Chippewa Falls, Wisconsin on September 19, 1975.

Tonino Ricci was among the crew on Challenge to White Fang, and would later direct a third White Fang film with White Fang to the Rescue (1975).
