= Ugo Liberatore =

Italian film director and screenwriter (1927–2012)

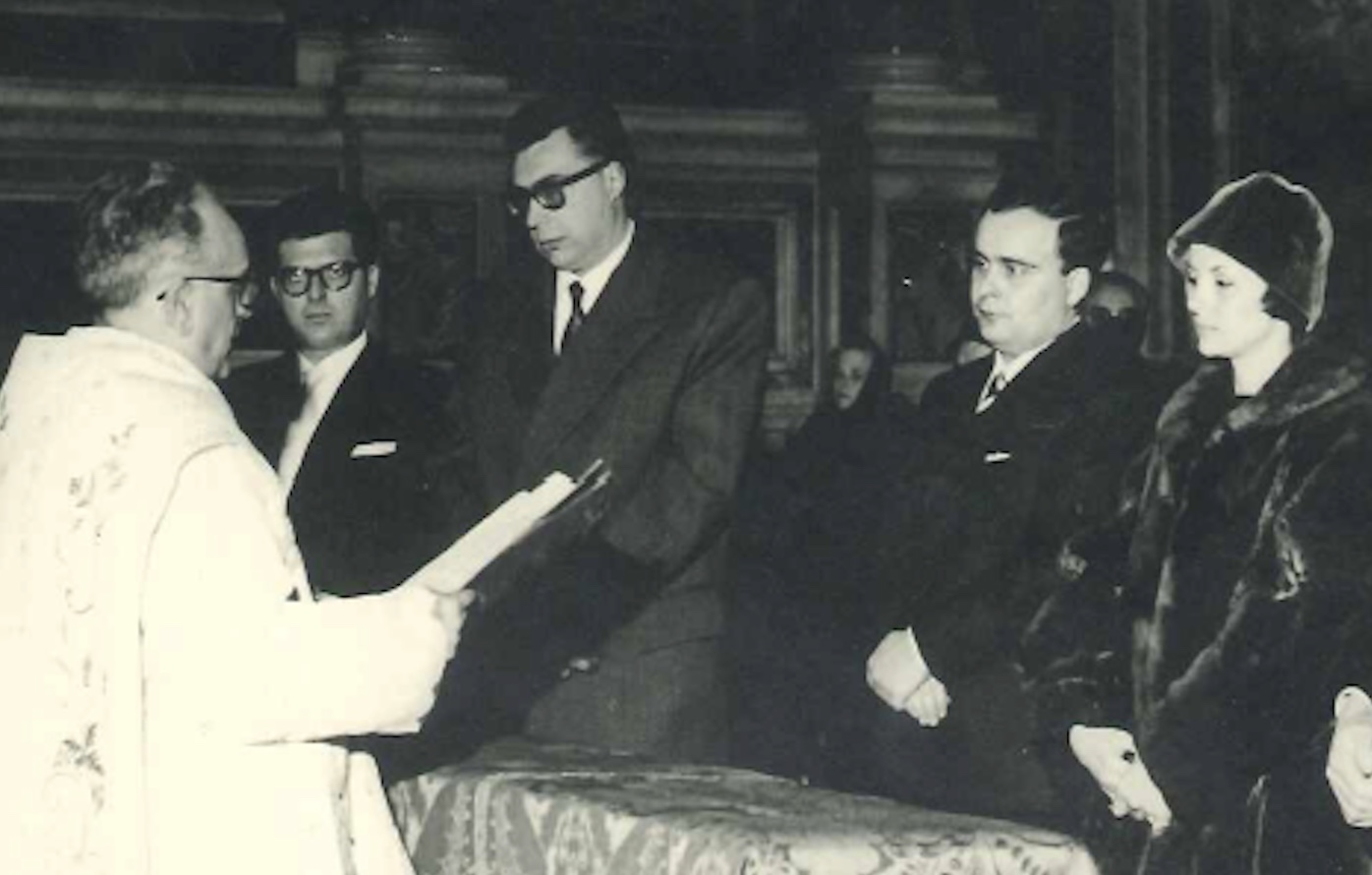
- Born: 26 September 1927; San Valentino in Abruzzo Citeriore, Italy
- Died: 21 June 2012 (aged 84); Pescara, Italy
- Occupation: Screenwriter
- Years active: 1960–1993

Ugo Liberatore (26 September 1927 – 21 June 2012) was an Italian screenwriter and film director. He contributed to more than forty films since 1960.

== Selected filmography ==
Screenwriter
Year	Title	Role	Notes
1962	The Avenger		
1963	The Reunion		
1963	The Empty Canvas		(co-screenwriter)
1964	Pirates of Malaysia		
1965	Hercules and the Princess of Troy		
1966	A Maiden for a Prince		
1966	La strega in amore		
1966	The Idol		(original story only)
1968	Bora Bora		also director
1968	The Sex of Angels		also director
1970	May Morning		also director
1970	Bali		also director
1972	Chronicle of a Homicide		
1978	Nero veneziano		also director
1981	La gatta da pelare		
