= Dagger Eyes =

1983 film by Carlo Vanzina

- Directed by: Carlo Vanzina
- Screenplay by: Carlo Vanzina; Enrico Vanzina
- Story by: Enrico Vanzina
- Produced by: Goffredo Lombardo
- Starring: Carole Bouquet; Duilio Del Prete; John Steiner; Gabriele Tinti; Peter Berling; Janet Ågren; Philip Coccioletti
- Cinematography: Giuseppe Maccari
- Edited by: Raimondo Crociani
- Music by: Armando Trovajoli
- Production company: Tris Film
- Distributed by: Titanus
- Release date: 1983
- Running time: 88 minute
- Country: Italy

Dagger Eyes (Italian: Mystère) is a 1983 Italian thriller film directed by Carlo Vanzina and written by Carlo Vanzina and Enrico Vanzina, starring Carole Bouquet (as Mystère), John Steiner and Janet Agren.

== Plot ==
Mystère is a high-class French prostitute who works in Rome. Her friend and colleague Pamela steals a gold lighter from a German customer and hides it in her purse. The German and Pamela are mysteriously killed in rapid succession and Mystère is saved from an aggression only by the prompt intervention of Inspector Colt. Mystère and Colt come to a subtle understanding that will allow the pair to come to the fore of the international intrigue in which they find themselves involved.

The German was in fact a photographer who had taken very compromising shots of an attack by the Soviet secret services on an American office in Piazza di Spagna where a politician was assassinated. The microfilm from the camera was hidden in the lighter that ended up in Mystère's possession. Mystère discovers that her friend's killer, is Captain Levi, the head of Criminalpol, and manages to save Colt from him. Colt kills Levi and decides to deal directly with the secret services to be able to obtain a large sum for the film and escape to make a new life with Mystère.

An adventurous succession of events allows the inspector to obtain a million dollars, but the initial plan changes and he leaves Mystère behind. Mystère finds Colt in his golden exile in Hong Kong and instead of taking revenge, the couple fall in love. Not even the arrival of the assassin Iranov, following his creed to "never leave anything behind" and his attempt to reclaim the money from the film negatives, spoils the new life Colt and Mystère have made.

== Cast ==
- Carole Bouquet as Mystère
- Philip Coccioletti as Inspector Colt
- Duilio Del Prete as Captain Levi
- John Steiner as Ivanov
- Gabriele Tinti as Mink
- Peter Berling as Reinhardt
- Janet Ågren as Pamela
- Samuele Goldzader
- Marcia Briscoe
- Livio Galassi as Pamela's brother
- Lionello Pio Di Savoia
- Gregory Snegoff
- Stefano Davanzati
- Roberto Renna
- Sergio Tardioli

== Production ==
Dagger Eyes was inspired by Jean-Jacques Beineix's Diva (1981), with screenwriter Enrico Vanzina recalling that he and his brother Carlo Vanzina "gave priority to images" for the film.

The ending of the film set in Hong Kong was forced on the Vanzina brothers by producer Goffredo Lombardo.

== Release and reception ==
Dagger Eyes was released in 1983. It was distributed theatrically by Titanus. It was released on home video in a dubbed format the United States as Dagger Eyes by Vista Home Video. Roberto Curti stated the film had "good commercial results" leading to the Vanzina brothers to develop Nothing Underneath.

In the Italian newspaper Stampa Sera, Piero Perona said that since the film Diva already was released, Vanzina should have spared himself the effort on this film, describing it as a film that was convoluted, unsuspenseful, and had editing that betrayed common sense.

From retrospective reviews, in his book Italian Giallo in Film and Television, film critic and historian Roberto Curti stated that the film was a "competent but hollow genre product" finding it was marred by a dull male lead and a bad ending.
