= Natasha Hovey =

Italian actress (born 1967)

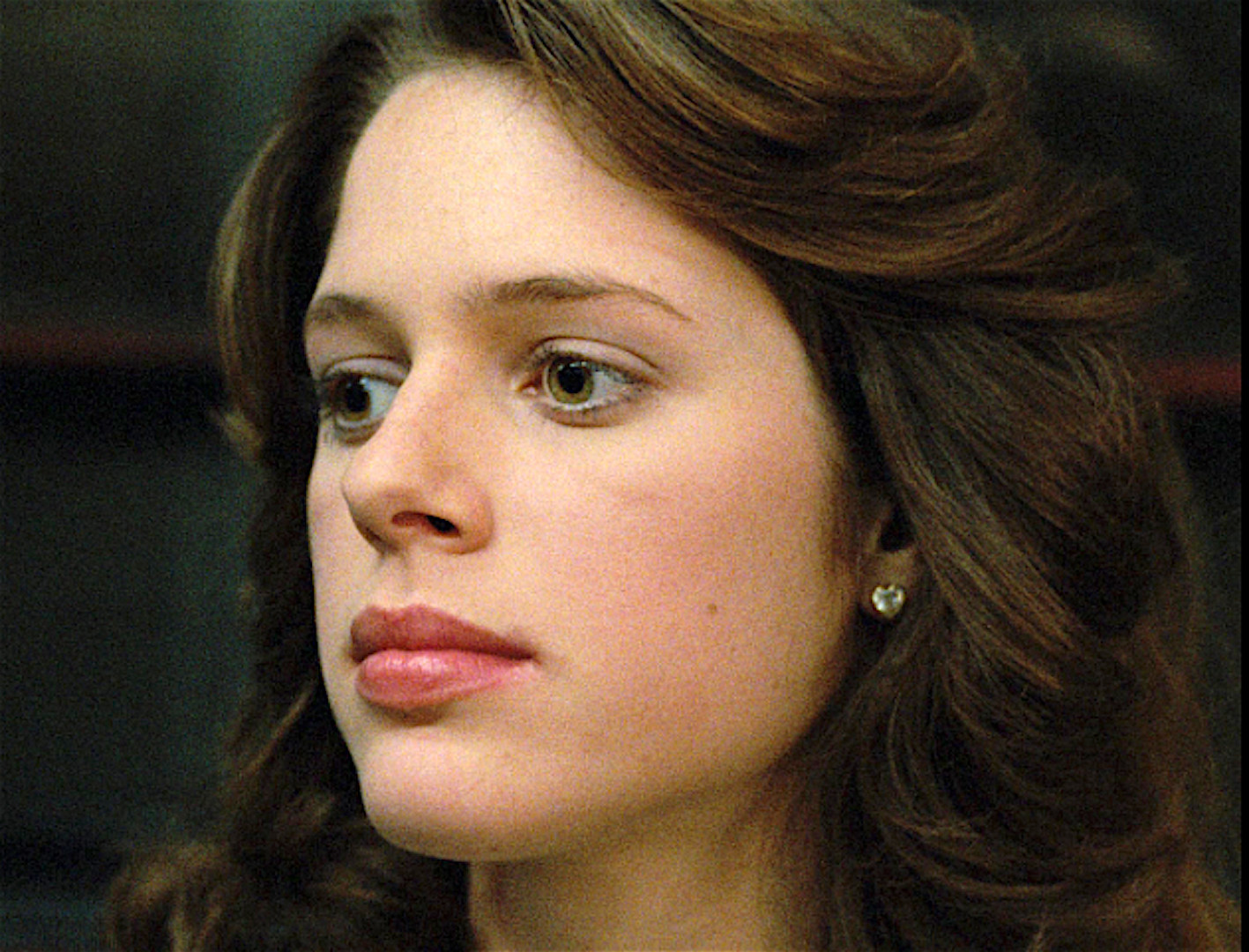
- Hovey in the movie Dèmoni (Demons)
- Born: August 14, 1967 (age 58); Beirut, Lebanon
- Occupation: Actress
- Children: David

Natasha Hovey (born August 14, 1967) is a Lebanese-Italian-French former film and television actress and a radio-hostess.

Hovey was born in Beirut, Lebanon, the daughter of an American musician father named Allen Hovey and a Dutch graphologist mother. She moved to Rome at 7, and at 16 debuted as actress with a leading role in Carlo Verdone's Acqua e sapone.

Her typical role was the young, pretty high-class girl. She also appeared in commercials, television programs and stage works.

In the late 1990s she moved to Paris and retired from the entertainment industry.

== Selected filmography ==
- Acqua e sapone (1983)
- Summer Games (1984)
- Demons (1985)
- Compagni di scuola (1988)
- Volevo i pantaloni (1990)
- La piovra, season 7 (1995)
