= Thor the Conqueror =

- Directed by: Tonino Ricci
- Screenplay by: Tito Carpi
- Story by: Tito Carpi
- Produced by: Roberto Poggi; Marcello Romeo
- Starring: Bruno Minniti; Maria Romano; Malisa Longo; Luigi Mezzanotte
- Cinematography: Giovanni Bergamini
- Edited by: Vincenzo Tomassi
- Music by: Francesco De Masi
- Production company: Abruzzo Cinematografica
- Release date: 5 February 1983 (Italy)
- Running time: 91 minutes
- Country: Italy

Thor the Conqueror (Italian: Thor il conquistatore) is a 1983 Italian film directed by Tonino Ricci.

== Story ==
In the vein of CONAN THE BARBARIAN and Lucio Fulci's CONQUEST comes a tale of mythology and magic, of how THOR, a legendary god, triumphs over overwhelming odds to great victory and the destruction of his foes. After both his parents are brutally murdered by his father's rival Gnut and his men the new born Thor is placed in hiding by the physical embodiment of the god Teisha. Raised in secret under the guidance of Teisha, Thor comes to maturity and goes on a quest to avenge the death of his parents and return peace to his lands, in the process he discovers a woman to take as his wife. Taking the beautiful warrior virgin, Ina, as his companion, his exploits lead to a confrontation with Gnut, the slayer of his father. He finds and uncovers his father's sword and masters the art of combat, all under the ever watchful eye of the amorphous Teisha. How can Thor overcome Gnut and his horde? Watch the story of Thor, The Conqueror, to this day recalled in legend and in rock drawings!

== Cast ==
- Bruno Minniti as Thor
- Maria Romano as Ina
- Malisa Longo as the slave girl

== Release ==
Thor the Conqueror was released in Italy on 5 February 1983.

Daniel R. Budnik, author of 80s Action Movies on the Cheap, stated that Thor the Conqueror "wallows in its own stupidity" and noted the film's misogyny, citing that the film was made in "different times."
