= Acqua e sapone =

- Italian theatrical release poster by Renato Casaro
- Directed by: Carlo Verdone
- Written by: Carlo Verdone; Enrico Oldoini; Franco Ferrini
- Produced by: Mario Cecchi Gori; Vittorio Cecchi Gori
- Starring: Carlo Verdone; Natasha Hovey; Florinda Bolkan
- Cinematography: Danilo Desideri
- Edited by: Antonio Siciliano
- Music by: Fabio Liberatori; Gaetano Curreri
- Distributed by: Variety Distribution
- Release date: 1983
- Running time: 103 min
- Country: Italy
- Language: Italian

Acqua e sapone (Water and Soap) is an Italian romantic comedy film by Carlo Verdone.

Verdone, here in his fourth film direction, also served as co-writer and main actor.

== Plot ==
Sandy is an American teenager who has become a famous baby-model, just arrived in Rome for photo shoots and fashion shows that will engage her for a few months. Being a minor, Sandy is accompanied and directed in all activities by her mother and stepfather, who seem to act toward the girl more as career managers and promoters, than as loving parents. Sandy's mother wants in all cases her education not to lag behind due to the many professional commitments, and decides to hire therefore a private tutor. She tries to offer the job to the well-known theologian and teacher Michael Spinetti, calling the convent where he lives. By chance however the phone is picked up by Rolando Ferrazza, a well-qualified young graduate who is working there just as a janitor due to unemployment.

Being mistaken for Spinetti, Rolando pretends to be a priest and impersonates the famous teacher in order to make more money. The deception succeeds with Sandy's parents, but it is soon uncovered by the girl. Seeing this as an opportunity to get some freedom and experience life beyond the many restrictions and work sacrifice of her public career, Sandy blackmails Rolando to indulge her whims, to take her around the city and have fun, under the pretense of educational visits to various Roman museums and cultural attractions. Gradually a tender friendship also develops among the two, and it starts to progress also toward romantic interest between the beautiful and naive teenager, and the more mature but timid and insecure man.

Eventually however Sandy's mother discovers the truth and fires Rolando in a fit of rage, only abstaining from accusation of rape and kidnapping in order not to spoil Sandy's public image with a scandal. Roland can no longer return to the convent as a janitor either, and misses Sandy very much. The feeling is reciprocal though, and one night the young woman escapes from a photographic set in order to suddenly crash at Rolando's house. The two spend a few hours together again, this time also as lovers. In the end the girl decides to return to her family and life, leaving Rolando to find his own future.

== Cast ==
- Carlo Verdone: Rolando Ferrazza
- Natasha Hovey: Sandy Walsh
- Florinda Bolkan: Wilma Walsh, mother of Sandy
- Glenn Saxson: Ted
- Elena Fabrizi: sora Ines
- Fabrizio Bracconeri: Enzo
- Christian De Sica: presenter

== Production ==
Carlo Verdone was inspired by the plot of the film by a journalistic service of RAI, made by Carlo Sartori, which told the phenomenon of the so-called "babymodels" – just exploded in the early 1980s, with the case of Brooke Shields –, and to complain exploitation of mothers on their prodigal daughters; mothers not very sensitive to the need for a balanced psychological development of adolescent daughters, who deprived them of a serene infancy to take them to forced stages to success.

=== Cast ===
The female protagonist of the film, Natasha Hovey, was here at her film debut. Fabrizio Bracconeri, who plays Rolando's neighbor, was also in the first career film: Verdone had met him in the garage where he worked and already in the past had asked the actor and director to make him play a part in his job; when for the role of the neighbor he was looking for someone who spoke in Roman in the same way as Sora Lella, Verdone decided to try it, then writing it for the film.

For the role of Wilma Walsh, Sandy's mother, Verdone had initially thought of Virna Lisi, then opting for Florinda Bolkan. Elena Fabrizi instead returns to play the role of the grandmother of the protagonist in a film by Verdone, as had already happened in an episode of White, Red and Verdone. Finally appears in a small cameo, as a presenter of a fashion show, Christian De Sica; Verdone wanted to help his friend, as well as his brother-in-law, at a time when he was in financial difficulty.

== Soundtrack ==
The song Acqua e sapone, written by Vasco Rossi and music by Gaetano Curreri, is sung by the Stadio.

== Citations and references ==
- As well as the protagonist Rolando Ferrazza, also the same Carlo Verdone graduated in letters with 110 cum laude.
