= Rush (1983 film) =

Italian action film directed by Tonino Ricci

- Directed by: Tonino Ricci
- Screenplay by: Tito Carpi
- Story by: Tito Carpi
- Produced by: Marcello Romeo
- Starring: Bruno Minniti; Gordon Mitchell; Laura Trotter
- Cinematography: Giovanni Bergamini
- Music by: Francesco De Masi
- Production company: Biro Cinematografica
- Release date: 1983
- Country: Italy

Rush is an Italian science fiction and action film. It stars Bruno Minniti (credited on-screen as Conrad Nichols), Gordon Mitchell, Laura Trotter and Rita Furlan. The film was shot in Panza, Italy and at I.N.C.I.R.-De Paolis Studios in Rome, Italy.

== Synopsis ==
Rush is a solitary survivor, existing as a scavenger in a post-nuclear holocaust world. Water is scarce, as is plant life, and often fought to the death for. Rush discovers that water is being hoarded by the evil Yor and becomes a one-man army to save the world. Most of society is barely hanging on, living in tattered rags. Yor maintains order by using a well armed militia, the Untouchables and he is experimenting with ways to repopulate the Earth's plant population. Rush counters with his own group of freedom fighters.

== Release ==
Rush was released in the United States in October 1984 by Cinema Shares International Distribution Corporation.

== Reception ==
Variety referred to the film as a "minor, highly derivative Italian action picture in the science fiction genre". The review noted that the film "skimps on story and incident" and noted that several characters and scenes strongly resemble the film First Blood. Creature feature gave the movie one out of 5 stars, finding the action sequences unbelievable and the movie as a whole "super-chintzey." It also cited the Rambo resemblance. TV Guide called the movie stupid.
