= John Steiner =

English actor (1941–2022)

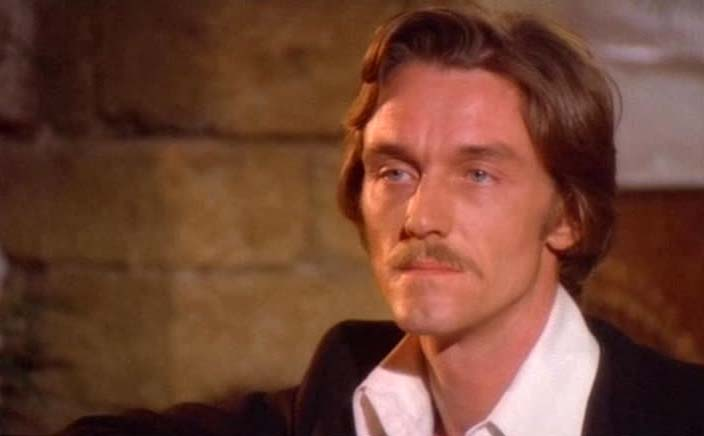
- Steiner in Waves of Lust (1975)
- Born: 7 January 1941; Chester, Cheshire, England
- Died: 31 July 2022 (aged 81); La Quinta, California, U.S.
- Occupations: Actor, real estate agent
- Years active: 1965–1991 (acting); 1991–2022 (real estate)
- Website: https://johnsteiner.evrealestate.com/

John Steiner (7 January 1941 – 31 July 2022) was an English actor. Tall and gaunt, he attended the Royal Academy of Dramatic Art and performed on-stage for the Royal Shakespeare Company, but was best known to audiences for his roles in Italian films, several of which became cult classics.

== Early life and education ==
Steiner was born in Chester, Cheshire on 7 January 1941, to Ernest Steiner and Joan (nee Dutton). His father was Swiss. He studied at the Royal Academy of Dramatic Art.

== Career ==
Out of drama school, Steiner joined the Royal Shakespeare Company. He acted in the role of Monsieur Dupere in Peter Brook's production of Marat/Sade. He reprised the role when the play was transferred to Broadway, and again for the 1967 film adaptation.

On television, he played Grey Wyler, a psychology student in The Death Game, a 1967 episode of The Saint. He found work primarily in films including and the original Bedazzled (1967) with Peter Cook and Dudley Moore.

=== In Italy ===
In 1969, Steiner played a part in the Spaghetti Western Tepepa, and also appeared opposite Franco Nero in White Fang, directed by Lucio Fulci. In 1971 he starred in the television series Hine. In 1979 he featured in the leading role of Leo in a television production of Design for Living by Noël Coward.

He found himself in demand in Italy and moved there, appearing in a great number of Italian exploitation and B-films including police actioners (Violent Rome), westerns (Mannaja), war films (The Last Hunter), nazisploitation (Deported Women of the SS Special Section), sci-fi adventure films (Yor, the Hunter from the Future), and horror films, such as Mario Bava's Shock, Dario Argento's Tenebrae, and Ruggero Deodato's Body Count. He also became a favourite of famed Italian filmmaker Tinto Brass, featuring in Salon Kitty, the infamous Caligula, Action, and Paprika. He remained in steady demand until the late 1980s.

=== Retirement and later life ===
As the Italian film industry dwindled, Steiner retired from acting in 1991 and moved to California, where he became a successful real estate agent. Steiner later contributed to DVD extras on some of his films and gave interviews about his Italian work.

== Personal life ==
Steiner was bisexual. During the 1960s he was in a long-term relationship with director John Schlesinger and became the basis for the character Bob Elkin (played by Murray Head) in Schlesinger's semi-autobiographical film Sunday Bloody Sunday.

He later married, and is survived by his wife of over 30 years.

In addition to English, Steiner spoke French, Italian, and German.

=== Death ===
Steiner died in a car crash in La Quinta, California, on 31 July 2022, at the age of 81.

== Partial filmography ==
- Marat/Sade (1967) – Monsieur Dupere
- Bedazzled (1967) – TV Announcer (uncredited)
- Work Is a Four-Letter Word (1968) – Anthony
- Tepepa (1969) – Doctor Henry Price
- The Thirteen Chairs (1969) – Stanley Duncan
- El bosque del lobo (1970) – Robert
- A Girl Called Jules (1970) – Luciano
- May Morning (1970) – Roderick Stanton
- The Golden Ass (1970) – Aristomene
- Bali (1970) – Arthur Glenn
- The Case Is Closed, Forget It (1971) – Biro
- Slap the Monster on Page One (1972) – Ingegner Montelli
- The Police Serve the Citizens? (1973) – Lambro
- Massacre in Rome (1973) – Col. Dollmann
- Black Holiday (1973) – Scagnetti
- White Fang (1973) – Charles 'Beauty' Smith
- Morel's Invention (1974) – Morel
- Challenge to White Fang (1974) – Beauty Smith / Charles Forth
- The Last Day of School Before Christmas (1975) – Il Tenente
- I Don't Want to Be Born (1975) – Tommy Morris
- Waves of Lust (1975) – Giorgio / Husband
- Violent Rome (1975) – Franco Spadoni 'Chiodo'
- Dracula in the Provinces (1975) – Count Dragulescu
- Salon Kitty (1976) – Biondo
- Le guêpier (1976) – Fisher
- Mark Strikes Again (1976) – Paul Henkel
- Deported Women of the SS Special Section (1976) – Herr Erner
- Bloody Payroll (1976) – Fausto
- Plot of Fear (1976) – Hoffmann
- Von Buttiglione Sturmtruppenführer (1977) – Schwein
- Shock (1977) – Bruno Baldini
- Mannaja (1977) – Valler
- The Criminals Attack, The Police Respond (1977) – Rufy
- Gangbuster (1977) – Killer
- Antonio Gramsci: The Days of Prison (1977) – Laurin
- Goodbye & Amen (1978) – Donald Grayson
- L'Amour en question (1978) – Tom Hastings
- Caligula (1979) – Longinus
- Action (1980) – The Manager
- The Last Hunter (1980) – Major William Cash
- Car Crash (1981) – Kirby
- The Salamander (1981) – Captain Roditi
- Hunters of the Golden Cobra (1982) – Captain David Franks
- Tenebrae (1982) – Christiano Berti
- Yor, the Hunter from the Future (1983) – Overlord
- Dagger Eyes (1983) – Ivanov
- The Ark of the Sun God (1984) – Lord Dean
- I due carabinieri (1984) – Crazy Man on Train
- A.D. (1985, TV Mini-Series) – Simon the Magus
- Cut and Run (1985) – Vlado
- Commando Leopard (1985) – Smithy
- The Berlin Affair (1985) – Oskar Engelhart
- Troppo forte (1985) – Mr. Adams
- Operation Nam (1986) – James Walcott
- Body Count (1986) – Dr. Olsen
- Summer Night (1986) – Frederick, Fulvia's lover
- Lone Runner (1986) – Skorm
- Julia and Julia (1987) – Alex
- Night of the Sharks (1988) – Rosentski
- The Commander (1988) – Duclaud
- Striker (1988) – Kariasin
- Appointment in Liverpool (1988)
- Sinbad of the Seven Seas (1989) – Jaffar
- Massacre Play (1989) – Danilo
- Paprika (1991) – Principe Ascanio (final film role)
