= White Fang to the Rescue =

- Directed by: Tonino Ricci
- Written by: Sandro Continenza; Giovanni Simonelli
- Produced by: Edmondo Amati
- Starring: Maurizio Merli
- Cinematography: Giovanni Bergamini
- Music by: Carlo Rustichelli
- Release date: 1974
- Country: Italy
- Language: Italian

Zanna Bianca alla riscossa (internationally released as White Fang to the Rescue) is a 1974 Italian adventure film directed by Tonino Ricci. It is an unofficial sequel of Lucio Fulci's 1973 film White Fang, in which Ricci was second unit director. The film received mixed reviews.

== Plot ==
In late 19th century Canada, Benjamin Dover, a prospector, is robbed and killed by two outlaws. His friend Burt Halloway, takes over the responsibility for bringing up Benjamin's son, Kim. With the aid of his wolf dog, a "man's best friend", they track down the outlaws and recover the precious metal.

== Cast ==
- Maurizio Merli as Burt Halloway
- Henry Silva as Mr. Nelson
- Renzo Palmer as RCMP Sergeant
- Gisela Hahn as Katie
- Benito Stefanelli as Jackson
- Donald O'Brien as Caroll
- Luciano Rossi as Bailey
- Attilio Dottesio
- Riccardo Pizzuti as Dog Trainer
