= White Fang (1973 film) =

1973 film directed by Lucio Fulci

- Italian film poster
- Directed by: Lucio Fulci
- Screenplay by: Roberto Gianviti; Piero Regnoli; Harry Alan Towers; Guy Elmes; Thom Keyes; Guillaume Roux
- Based on: White Fang by Jack London
- Starring: Franco Nero; Virna Lisi; Fernando Rey; John Steiner
- Cinematography: Pablo Ripoli
- Edited by: Ornella Micheli
- Music by: Carlo Rustichelli
- Production companies: Oceania Produzioni Internazionali Cinematografiche; In-Cine Compañía Industrial Cinematográfica; Les Productions Fox Europa
- Distributed by: Titanus (Italy); In-Cine Distribudora Cinematografica (Spain); 20th Century Fox (France)
- Release dates: December 22, 1973 (Rome); June 27, 1975 (France)
- Running time: 105 minutes
- Countries: Italy; Spain; France
- Box office: 2.471 billion Italian lire

White Fang (Italian: Zanna Bianca) is a 1973 adventure film directed by Lucio Fulci. The film stars Franco Nero, Fernando Rey and Virna Lisi. It is an adaptation of Jack London's 1906 novel White Fang.

The film was part of a trend of European films inspired during the 1970s by Call of the Wild (1972), which was a surprise hit in Italy. The film gained great commercial success and generated a sequel, Challenge to White Fang (1974) as well as several derivative films, including White Fang to the Rescue (1974) and White Fang and the Hunter (1975).

== Plot ==
Set in the year 1896 in the Yukon Wilderness, the film opens when Charlie an Aboriginal Canadian fur trader, discovers his young son Mitsah attempting to befriend a wolf, he scares the beast away, believing it to be too wild and dangerous. Unknown to him, his son persists. Mitsah names the animal White Fang because of the ivory-white teeth the beast sprouts. That night, Charlie changes his mind about the animal when it arrives at his hut barking furiously. Mitsah, while strolling through the woods at night to meet his friend, falls through the thin ice of a frozen lake and the animal, a wolf/dog cross breed, raises the alarm.

Mitsah is saved by his father and canine friend, but falls seriously ill with hypothermia after his plunge into the icy water. Charlie decides to take his son for medical treatment at the nearest settlement. While carrying Mitsah down a mountainside, he meets an old friend named Kurt Johnson a fellow fur trapper who agrees to help Charlie carry the barely conscious Mitsah. Kurt tells them the nearest town is a place called Dawson City, in which he informs them that it is not safe there. But Charlie tells them that he must get medical attention to his son or he will die. The group, after arriving at a riverside port below the snow line, are introduced to Jason Scott, a writer traveling to Dawson City in search of a story. Once they arrive in town on a riverboat steamer, they meet with Sister Evangeline, a middle-aged nun who has recently arrived in Dawson City to set up a hospital mission. Jason and Kurt soon discover that Dawson City is a hotbed to business corruption and barely suppressed lawlessness. Sister Evangeline has already encountered corruption in the form of the town's alcoholic priest Father Oatley, whose interest in her money is highly suspect. Father Oatley is under the thumb of Dawson City's richest and most powerful resident, Beauty Smith. Smith has bought his way into overall control of the settlement, with some cash and many promissory notes he gives to the residents in exchange for gold. He surrounds himself with a posse of thugs wherever he goes and lords it up around town like a dandified artisto. Smith is also romantically involved with Father Oatley's attractive daughter Krista, who works as a singer and dancer in Dawson City's notorious bar while her father conceals his paternity connection to her in shame.

Sister Evangelina takes care of the sick Mitsah at the hut she plans to turn into a hospital, while outside, Scott, Kurt, and Charlie are threatened by Hall one of Beauty Smith's henchmen plus a few others, demanding money for keeping Mitsah in town as well as for the hospital sign they put up. Scott and Kurt beat up Hall and all of Beauty Smith's henchmen single-handedly, which Smith himself watches with both anger and admiration for their courage.

A little later, Charlie is threatened by Smith's henchman who make racial slurs as him as well as demand money as well as the fur pelts that he brought with him. A fight is provoked between White Fang and Smith's champion hound he uses for dogfight gambling bets. White Fang is victorious, killing the opposing dog. Beauty Smith, seeing the whole thing, approaches Charlie and offers the Indian trader a large sum of money for his dog. Charlie refuses to sell White Fang. Furious at this one humiliating failure of his attempt to wield cash power, Smith stalks off for a muttered conference with his lackeys. As Smith walks away, Charlie is surrounded by the jostling gang and fatally stabbed to death. Scott and Kurt arrive on the scene just as Smith's henchmen disperse where the assembled townspeople, gripped with fear of retribution, claim to have seen nothing.

White Fang is captured by Smith's henchmen and put to service, earning money in a public fight against a captured, wild bear chained to a post. White Fang is severely injured before Scott and Sister Evangelina arrive to rescue him. Returning the wolf-dog to Mitsah, who is starting to recover, they suppress any news of the death of his father until he is physically recovered. In the meantime, Scott takes a parental interest to the youngster.

Soon, everything starts to go wrong for Beauty Smith when he tries to persuade Krista to accompany him away from Dawson City for he is planning to skip town with his ill-gotten money, trailing unpaid promissory notes behind him. A frantic tussle erupts where Smith accidentally shoots Krista, killing her. Father Oatley, arrives on the scene and sees what Smith has done. Enraged, Oatley runs out onto the streets shouting Smith's secret to the startled townsfolk. Smith immediately decides to start packing to move onto Nome, Alaska where more gold has recently been discovered and set up shop there. Oatley's outburst blows the lid off the secret as the whole town prepares to move on to the newly discovered gold deposits.

Meanwhile, Chester, the Smith assassin who murdered Charlie, is freed from his jail cell by a corrupt Mountie. On Smith's orders, Chester sneaks into Jason Scott's quarters and almost succeeds in killing him. But White Fang leaps in through a window and savages Chester. Beauty Smith and his lead henchman, Hall, then sneak into the mission hut and take Mitsah hostage, and shoot Father Oatley dead as he attempts to stop them. Scott, White Fang, and a horde or irate villagers give chase. Smith attempts to sweep away his pursuers by blowing up a dam. But White Fang jumps upon Smith and saves the day by gnashing at the villain's wrist. But as Scott drags Beauty Smith back to face justice, the dynamite explodes, sweeping away Smith, Hall, and White Fang.

The following day, the remainder of the townspeople, including Scott, Kurt, Sister Evangelina, and Mitsha sail away from the abandoned town down the river in a steamboat as a tearful Mitsah is distraught over the loss of both his father and beloved hound. But at the last minute, White Fang reappears, swimming from the riverbank after the departing boat and is soon reunited with Mitsah once again.

== Cast ==
- Franco Nero as Jason Scott
- Virna Lisi as Sister Evangelina
- Missaele Chiappetta as Mitsah (credited as Missaele)
- Fernando Rey as Father Oatley
- John Steiner as Charles 'Beauty' Smith
- Carole André as Krista Oatley
- Raimund Harmstorf as Kurt Jansen
- Daniel Martin as Charlie
- Daniele Dublino as Chester
- John Bartha as Mountie who frees Chester
- Maurice Poli as Mountie

== Production ==
White Fang was an international film co-production between Italy, Spain and France. It was made by the Rome-based Oceania Produzioni Internazionali Cinematografiche, the Madrid-based In-Cine Compañía Industrial Cinematográfica, and the Paris-Based Les Productions Fox Europa.

White Fang went into development after a previous Harry Alan Towers-produced film, The Call of the Wild (1972), performed well enough in the box office to consider further Jack London adaptations. Initially Towers had prepared an adaptation of London's White Fang, to be shot in Spain with Peter Collinson directing. Collinson left the project, leading to the film being shot by Lucio Fulci in June 1973. Despite Towers being credited as a screenwriter, neither the Italian nor the English-language credits mention him as a producer on the film.

According to Roberto Sbarigia, the film was shot over approximately ten weeks, with locations including Bad Mitterndorf and the mountains near Tauplitz, Austria. The role of young Native boy Mitsah was played by Missaela Chiappetta (credited as "Missaele"), a 9-year old Italian girl whose mother was a Brazilian of Japanese descent. She was chosen after she and her siblings were spotted in a park in Rome by an assistant director. The production originally wanted to cast her brother, who proved to be too young, so she got the part. Further shooting was scheduled in Madrid and Rome.

== Release ==
White Fang was distributed in Italy by Titanus Distribuzione. It was released in Rome on December 22, 1973 and later in Bari on January 3, 1974. It grossed a total of 2.471 billion Italian lire in Italy.

The film's box office in Italy led to Variety reporting that producer Giulio Sbarigia to contact Fulci to quickly develop a sequel. This film also featured returning actors Franco Nero, Virna Lisi and John Steiner. A sequel, Challenge to White Fang was also directed by Fulci and released in Rome on October 31, 1974. A third-film was directed by the second-unit director of Challenge and released in 1975 as White Fang to the Rescue.

It later received theatrical release in London, England on December 13, 1974 with a 101 minute running time. It was released in France as Croc blanc on June 27, 1975 with a 98 minute running time. It was released in Cedar Rapids in the United States on October 31, 1975.
