= Sal Borgese =

Italian film actor (born 1937)

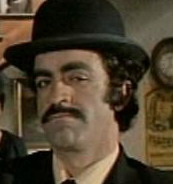
- Born: 5 March 1937 (age 88); Rome, Italy
- Occupation: Film actor

Sal Borgese (born 5 March 1937) is an Italian film actor. He is sometimes credited as Salvatore Borghese or Mark Trevor. He is noted for extensive work in the Italian film industry from the 1960s to present day, and for his work as a stuntman and acrobat.

Borgese's credits include parts in Spaghetti Westerns, sword-and-sandal, and spy films. On 9 October 2018 he received the "Tabernas de cine" award.

== Partial filmography ==
- Colossus of the Arena (1962)
- Challenge of the Gladiator (1965)
- 008: Operation Exterminate (1965)
- Countdown to Doomsday (1966)
- Blueprint for a Massacre (1967)
- Lotus Flowers for Miss Quon (1967)
- I quattro del pater noster (1969)
- Adios Sabata (1970)
- Light the Fuse... Sartana Is Coming (1970)
- Blackie the Pirate (1971)
- Delusions of Grandeur (1971)
- Si può fare... amigo (1972)
- Man Called Invincible (1973)
- The Big Family (1973)
- Pasqualino Cammarata, Frigate Captain (1974)
- Three Supermen of the West (1974)
- The Maddest Car in the World (1975)
- The Big Racket (1976)
- The Con Artists (1976)
- La tigre è ancora viva: Sandokan alla riscossa! (1977)
- Brothers Till We Die (1978)
- Süpermenler (1979)
- Super Fuzz (1980)
- Il Marchese del Grillo (1981)
- Who Finds a Friend Finds a Treasure (1981)
- Daughter of the Jungle (1982)
- The Rogues (1987)
- Night of the Sharks (1988)
- The Green Inferno (1988)
- Le comiche (1990)
- Johnny Stecchino (1991)
