= Janet Ågren =

Swedish actress and model

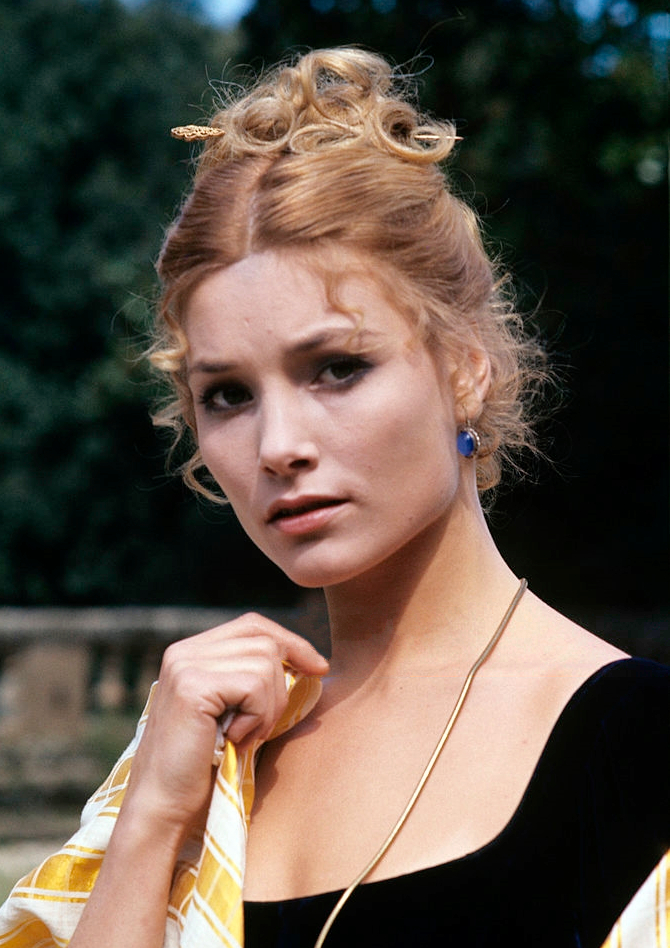
- Ågren in 1975
- Born: Lena Janet Yvonne Ågren; 6 April 1949 (age 77); Landskrona, Scania Province, Sweden
- Other names: Janet Maietto; Janet A. Fernandez
- Occupations: Actress; model
- Years active: 1968–1991

Lena Janet Yvonne Ågren (born 6 April 1949) is a Swedish former actress and model, known for her roles in Italian exploitation films.

== Early life ==
Ågren was born in Landskrona, Scania Province, a town she once described to Italian entertainment journalists as a "Northern Naples". After winning a beauty contest in Copenhagen, she began a modeling career, notably for Christian Dior. Her modeling career brought her to Rome where she studied acting at the Drama School directed by Alessandro Fersen.

== Acting career ==
Ågren made her film debut in Luciano Salce's Colpo di stato, and her early roles included the Michael Caine film Pulp (1972) as a receptionist, and the Jack Lemmon comedy Avanti! (1972) as a nurse. She appeared in 57 films, including The Left Hand of the Law (1975), Lucio Fulci's City of the Living Dead (1980), Umberto Lenzi's Eaten Alive! (1980), Panic (1982), Red Sonja (1985), the Bud Spencer comedy Aladdin (1986) and the cult horror film Ratman (1988). In the early 1980s, she also had a brief musical career.

== Personal life ==
Ågren is married to Italian film producer Carlo Maietto.

Ågren left acting in the early 1990s and moved to the US where she currently resides. She works as an interior designer and decorator in Miami.

== Selected filmography ==
- Donne... botte e bersaglieri (1968) – Rika
- The Two Crusaders (1968) – Clorinda
- Normal Young Man (1969) – Diana
- One on Top of the Other (1969) – Girl looking for Neurosedyl (uncredited)
- Pussycat, Pussycat, I Love You (1970) – (uncredited)
- Du soleil plein les yeux (1970) – Monica
- Io non spezzo... rompo (1971) – Carla Viganò
- Io non vedo, tu non parli, lui non sente (1971) – Monica Gorletti
- Pulp (1972) – Publisher's Receptionist
- Life Is Tough, Eh Providence? (1972) – Stella
- Avanti! (1972) – Nurse
- The Most Wonderful Evening of My Life (1972) – Simonetta
- Master of Love (1972) – Maddalena
- Fiorina la vacca (1972) – Tazia
- Tecnica di un amore (1973) – Monica
- Ingrid sulla strada (1973) – Ingrid
- The Killer Reserved Nine Seats (1974) – Kim
- The Profiteer (1974) – Teresa Adiutori
- Erotomania (1974) – Ciccia Persichetti
- Paolo Barca, Schoolteacher and Weekend Nudist (1975) – Giulia Hamilton
- The Left Hand of the Law (1975) – Gloria
- Sensualidad (1975) – María José
- Chi dice donna dice donna (1976) – Anita (segment "Ma non ci sposano")
- Vai col liscio (1976) – Celeste
- Per amore (1976) – Daniela Rovati
- Stato interessante (1977) – Carla (first story)
- Bermuda: Cave of the Sharks (1978) – Angelica
- The Uranium Conspiracy (1978) – Helga
- The Perfect Crime (1978) – Lady Gloria Boyd
- Deadly Chase (1978) – Giulia Medici
- The Iron Commissioner (1978) – Vera
- Lobster for Breakfast (1979) – Monique Dubois
- 7 ragazze di classe (1979) – Laura
- Maria – Nur die Nacht war ihr Zeuge (1980) – Maria
- Eaten Alive! (1980) – Sheila Morris
- City of the Living Dead (1980) – Sandra
- Prestami tua moglie (1980) – Ingrid Nillsen
- L'onorevole con l'amante sotto il letto (1981) – Anna Vinci
- La gatta da pelare (1981) – Margaret
- Don't Play with Tigers (1982) – Frau Kuppler
- Sogni mostruosamente proibiti (1982) – Dalia
- Panic (1982) – Jane Blake
- L'inceneritore (1982)
- Dagger Eyes (1983) – Pamela
- Occhio, malocchio, prezzemolo e finocchio (1983) – Helen
- Questo e Quello (1983) – Lucilla (segment "Questo... amore impossibile")
- Vediamoci chiaro (1984) – Geneviève
- Red Sonja (1985) – Varna
- Hands of Steel (1986) – Linda
- Aladdin (1986) – Janet Haddin
- Karate Warrior (1987) – Julia Scott
- Night of the Sharks (1988) – Liz Ziegler
- Ratman (1988) – Terry
- Magdalene (1988) – Anna
- Per sempre (1991) – Eleonora Rondi (final film role)
