= List of Italian films of 1973 =

A list of films produced in Italy in 1973 (see 1973 in film):

Italian films released in 1973
Title	Director	Cast	Genre	Notes
...All the Way, Boys!	Giuseppe Colizzi	Terence Hill, Bud Spencer	action-comedy	
Amarcord	Federico Fellini	Magali Noël, Bruno Zanin, Pupella Maggio, Armando Brancia, Alvaro Vitali	comedy-drama	David di Donatello winner. Academy Award for Best Foreign Language Film 1974, 3 Oscar nominations.
Amore e ginnastica	Luigi Filippo D'Amico	Lino Capolicchio, Senta Berger	comedy	
Anna, quel particolare piacere	Giuliano Carnimeo	Edwige Fenech, John Richardson, Richard Conte	drama	
Anything for a Friend	Demofilo Fidani	Ettore Manni, Bud Randall, Sleepy Warren	Western	
The Assassination of Matteotti	Florestano Vancini	Mario Adorf, Franco Nero, Vittorio De Sica	historical drama	Entered into the 8th Moscow International Film Festival
Bad Kids of the West	Tonino Ricci	Andrea Balestri, Cristiana, Mirko Ellis	Western	
Bawdy Tales	Sergio Citti	Franco Citti, Ninetto Davoli	comedy	
The Big Family	Tonino Ricci	Raymond Pellegrin, Simonetta Stefanelli	Crime	
Black Holiday	Marco Leto	Adolfo Celi, John Steiner	Drama	
Black Magic Rites	Renato Polselli	Mickey Hargitay, Rita Calderoni, Raoul Lovecchio	Horror	
The Bloody Hands of the Law	Mario Gariazzo	Philippe Leroy, Silvia Monti, Klaus Kinski	Crime	
Il Boss	Fernando Di Leo	Richard Conte, Henry Silva	—N/a	
A Brief Vacation	Vittorio De Sica	Florinda Bolkan, Renato Salvatori, Adriana Asti	drama	
Brothers Blue	Luigi Bazzoni	Guido Mannari, Tina Aumont, Jack Palance	Western	Italian-French co-production
Charity and the Strange Smell of Money	Italo Alfaro	Robert Malcolm, Piero Vida, Rosalba Neri	Western	
Chino	John Sturges, Diulio Coletti	Charles Bronson, Jill Ireland, Marcel Bozzuffi	Western	Italian-Spanish-French co-production
Colt in the Hand of the Devil	Gianfranco Baldanello	Robert Woods, William Berger, George Wang	Western	
Come Home and Meet My Wife	Mario Monicelli	Ugo Tognazzi, Ornella Muti, Michele Placido	Commedia all'italiana	
Counselor at Crime	Alberto De Martino	Tomas Milian, Martin Balsam, Francisco Rabal	Crime	
Cry of a Prostitute	Andrea Bianchi	Henry Silva, Barbara Bouchet	Crime	
Deaf Smith & Johnny Ears	Paolo Cavara	Franco Nero, Anthony Quinn, Pamela Tiffin	Western	
Dear Parents	Enrico Maria Salerno	Florinda Bolkan, Catherine Spaak	Melodrama	
Death Carries a Cane	Maurizio Pradeaux	Robert Hoffmann, Susan Scott	giallo	
Death Smiles on a Murderer	Joe D'Amato	Ewa Aulin, Klaus Kinski	Horror	
The Devil's Wedding Night	Luigi Batzella, Joe D'Amato	Mark Damon, Rosalba Neri, Esmeralda Barros	Horror	
Dirty Weekend	Dino Risi	Marcello Mastroianni, Oliver Reed	Commedia all'italiana	
Don't Look Now	Nicolas Roeg	Julie Christie, Donald Sutherland	Horror	British-Italian co-production
Even Angels Eat Beans	Luciano Salce	Giuliano Gemma, Bud Spencer	Action-comedy	
Fast-Hand is Still My Name	Mario Bianchi	Sergio Ciani, William Berger, Frank Brana	Western	Italian-Spanish co-production
The Fighting Fists of Shanghai Joe	Mario Caiano	Chen Lee, Klaus Kinski, Carla Romanelli	Western	
Flatfoot	Steno	Bud Spencer, Adalberto Maria Merli	poliziottesco-comedy	
Flesh for Frankenstein	Paul Morrissey	Udo Kier, Joe Dallesandro, Dalila Di Lazzaro	horror	
Il figlioccio del padrino	Mariano Laurenti	Franco Franchi, Saro Urzì	comedy	
The Flower with the Petals of Steel	Gianfranco Piccioli	Gianni Garko, Carroll Baker, Paola Senatore	giallo	
For a Book of Dollars	—N/a	Lincoln Tate, Gabriella Farinon, Jean-Claude Jabes	Western	
The Funny Face of the Godfather	Franco Prosperi	Alighiero Noschese, Minnie Minoprio	comedy	
Fuzzy the Hero	Tulio Demicheli	Anthony Steffen, Eduardo Fajardo, Roberto Camardiel	Western	Spanish-Italian co-production
Gang War in Milan (Milano rovente)	Umberto Lenzi	Antonio Sabàto, Philippe Leroy, Marisa Mell	Poliziottesco	
Giordano Bruno	Giuliano Montaldo	Gian Maria Volonté, Charlotte Rampling	biographical-drama	
Giovannona Long-Thigh	Sergio Martino	Edwige Fenech, Pippo Franco	commedia sexy all'italiana	
God's Executioner	Franco Lattanzi	William Berger, Donal O'Brien, George Wang	Western	
La grande abbuffata	Marco Ferreri	Marcello Mastroianni, Ugo Tognazzi, Michel Piccoli, Philippe Noiret	Satire	
The Great Kidnapping	Romolo Guerrieri	Enrico Maria Salerno, Lee J. Cobb, Jean Sorel	poliziottesco	
Hail the Artist	Yves Robert	Marcello Mastroianni, Françoise Fabian	Comedy	French-Italian co-production
Halleluja to Vera Cruz	Blanco Manini	Lionel Stander, Riccardo Salvino, Jean Louis	Western	
Here We Go Again, Eh Providence?	Alberto De Martino	Tomas Milian, Gregg Palmer, Carole Andre	Western	Italian-Spanish-French co-production
The Heroes	Duccio Tessari	Rod Steiger, Rosanna Schiaffino, Rod Taylor, Claude Brasseur	war comedy	
Heroes in Hell	Joe D'Amato	Klaus Kinski, Ettore Manni	war	
His Colt, Himself, His Revenge	Ferdinando Merighi	Dino Strano, Gordon Mitchell, John Braun	Western	
Hitler: The Last Ten Days	Ennio De Concini	Alec Guinness, Simon Ward, Adolfo Celi	biographical drama	
Holy God, Here Comes the Passatore!	Giuliano Carnimeo	George Hilton, Edwige Fenech	adventure-comedy	
Hospitals: The White Mafia	Luigi Zampa	Gabriele Ferzetti, Senta Berger, Enrico Maria Salerno	drama	Entered into the 1973 Cannes Film Festival
The Hostage Gang	Édouard Molinaro	Daniel Cauchy, Bulle Ogier, Gilles Ségal	Crime drama	Co-production with France
How Funny Can Sex Be?	Dino Risi	Giancarlo Giannini, Laura Antonelli	Commedia all'italiana	
I Kiss the Hand	Vittorio Schiraldi	Arthur Kennedy, John Saxon, Agostina Belli	Crime	
Io e lui	Luciano Salce	Lando Buzzanca, Bulle Ogier	Comedy	
Italian Graffiti	Alfio Caltabiano	Pino Colizzi, Ornella Muti	Crime-comedy	
The Jack London Story	Angelo D'Alessandro	Orso Maria Guerrini, Arnaldo Bellofiore, Andrea Checchi	Western	Italian-Yugoslavian co-production
Karate, Fists and Beans	Tonino Ricci	Dean Reed, Alfredo Mayo, Cris Huerta	Western	Italian-Spanish co-production
Ku-Fu? Dalla Sicilia con furore	Nando Cicero	Franco Franchi, Gianni Agus	Comedy	
Kung Fu Brothers in the Wild West	Yeo Ban Yee	William Berger, Jason Pai Piao, Donal O'Brien	Western	Italian-Hong Kong co-production
The Last Snows of Spring	Raimondo Del Balzo	Bekim Fehmiu, Agostina Belli	drama	
Little Funny Guy	Pasquale Festa Campanile	Adriano Celentano, Claudia Mori, Sybil Danning	comedy	
Long Lasting Days	Ferdinando Baldi	Mino Reitano, Ewa Aulin	crime	
Love and Anarchy	Lina Wertmüller	Giancarlo Giannini, Mariangela Melato, Lina Polito	comedy-drama	Giannini won Best Actor at the 1973 Cannes Film Festival
Il magnate	Giovanni Grimaldi	Lando Buzzanca, Rosanna Schiaffino	Comedy	
Malicious	Salvatore Samperi	Laura Antonelli, Turi Ferro, Tina Aumont	comedy	Entered into the 23rd Berlin International Film Festival
A Man Called Invincible	Giuliano Carnimeo	George Hilton, Chris Huerta, Evelyn Stewart	Western	
The Man Called Noon	Peter Collinson	Richard Crenna, Stephen Boyd, Rosanna Schiaffino	Western	Italian-Spanish-British co-production
Man with the Golden Winchester	Gianfranco Baldanello	Alberto Dell'Acqua, Fernando Sancho	Western	Italian-Spanish co-production
Massacre in Rome (Rappresaglia)	George Pan Cosmatos	Marcello Mastroianni, Richard Burton	War Drama	About Ardeatine massacre in WWII
Mean Frank and Crazy Tony	Michele Lupo	Lee Van Cleef, Tony Lo Bianco, Edwige Fenech	—N/a	
Milano trema - la polizia vuole giustizia	Sergio Martino	Richard Conte, Luc Merenda	Poliziottesco	
My Brother Anastasia	Steno	Alberto Sordi, Richard Conte	crime-comedy	
My Name Is Nobody	Tonino Valerii	Terence Hill, Henry Fonda	Western	Italian-French-West German co-production
My Pleasure Is Your Pleasure	Claudio Racca	Ewa Aulin, Barbara Bouchet, Barbara Bouchet, Sylva Koscina	commedia sexy all'italiana	
Il nano e la strega	Gibba	-	animated	
No, the Case Is Happily Resolved	Vittorio Salerno	Enzo Cerusico, Riccardo Cucciolla	crime	
Now Where Did the 7th Company Get to?	Robert Lamoureux	Pierre Mondy, Aldo Maccione	war-comedy	French-Italian co-production
Number One	Gianni Buffardi	Renzo Montagnani, Claude Jade	crime	
The Nun and the Devil	Domenico Paolella	Anne Heywood, Luc Merenda, Ornella Muti	Nunsploitation	
On the Third Day Arrived the Crow	—N/a	Lincoln Tate, William Berger, Dino Strano	Western	
Once Upon a Time in the Wild, Wild West	—N/a	Gordon Mitchell, Vincent Scott, Benito Pacifico, Malisa Longo	Western	
One Hamlet Less (Un Amleto di meno)	Carmelo Bene	Carmelo Bene	comedy	Entered into the 1973 Cannes Film Festival
One Russian Summer (Il giorno del furore)	Antonio Calenda	Oliver Reed, Claudia Cardinale	drama	
The Police Serve the Citizens?	Romolo Guerrieri	Enrico Maria Salerno, John Steiner	giallo-poliziottesco	
Polvere di stelle	Alberto Sordi	Alberto Sordi, Monica Vitti, John Phillip Law	Comedy, Musical	About Avanspettacolo (artist tours) during World War II
Il prato macchiato di rosso	Riccardo Ghione	Marina Malfatti, Nino Castelnuovo, Lucio Dalla	—N/a	
Property Is No Longer a Theft	Elio Petri	Ugo Tognazzi, Flavio Bucci	comedy	Entered into the 23rd Berlin International Film Festival
Redneck	Silvio Narizzano	Franco Nero, Telly Savalas, Mark Lester	crime	
Revolver	Sergio Sollima	Oliver Reed, Fabio Testi, Paola Pitagora, Agostina Belli	crime	
Ricco the Mean Machine	Tulio Demicheli	Christopher Mitchum, Barbara Bouchet	crime	
Rugantino	Pasquale Festa Campanile	Adriano Celentano, Claudia Mori, Renzo Palmer	comedy	
Seduction	Fernando Di Leo	Lisa Gastoni, Jenny Tamburi	Erotic-drama	
Il sergente Rompiglioni	Pier Giorgio Ferretti	Franco Franchi, Mario Carotenuto	Comedy	
Seven Deaths in the Cat's Eye	Antonio Margheriti	Jane Birkin, Hiram Keller, Serge Gainsbourg	horror	
Seven Hours of Violence	Michele Massimo Tarantini	George Hilton, Rosemary Dexter	crime-thriller	
Sex of the Witch	Angelo Pannaccio	Susanna Levi, Jessica Dublin, Sergio Ferero	horror-mystery	
Sinbad and the Caliph of Baghdad	Pietro Francisci	Robert Malcolm, Sonia Wilson, Luigi Bonos	—N/a	
Six Bounty Killers for a Massacre	Franco Lattanzi	Robert Woods, Donal O'Brien, Attilio Dottesio	Western	
Sgarro alla camorra	Ettore Maria Fizzarotti	Mario Merola, Dada Gallotti	Crime	
A Slightly Pregnant Man	Jacques Demy	Catherine Deneuve, Marcello Mastroianni	Comedy	French-Italian co-production
Sono stato io	Alberto Lattuada	Giancarlo Giannini, Silvia Monti	comedy-drama	
Special Killers	German Lorente	Frederick Stafford, Femi Benussi	thriller	
Stateline Motel	Maurizio Lucidi	Ursula Andress, Fabio Testi, Eli Wallach	crime	
Story of a Cloistered Nun	Domenico Paolella	Catherine Spaak, Eleonora Giorgi, Suzy Kendall, Martine Brochard	nunsploitation	
Super Bitch	Massimo Dallamano	Ivan Rassimov, Stephanie Beacham	Poliziottesco	
Teresa the Thief	Carlo Di Palma	Monica Vitti, Stefano Satta Flores, Michele Placido	Commedia all'italiana	
Those Dirty Dogs	Giuseppe Rosati	Gianni Garko, Stephen Boyd	Western	Italian-Spanish co-production
The Three Musketeers of the West	Bruno Corbucci	Giancarlo Prete, George Eastman	Western	Italian-Spanish-German co-production
Three Supermen of the West	Italio Martinenghi	George Martin, Salvatore Borgese, Frank Brana	Western	Italian-Spanish co-production
La Tosca	Pasquale Festa Campanile	Gigi Proietti, Monica Vitti, Vittorio Gassman	Commedia all'italiana	
Tony Arzenta	Duccio Tessari	Alain Delon, Richard Conte, Carla Gravina	crime	Italian-French co-production
The Train	Pierre Granier-Deferre	Jean-Louis Trintignant, Romy Schneider	war drama	French-Italian co-production
Torso (I corpi presentano tracce di violenza carnale)	Sergio Martino	Suzy Kendall, Luc Merenda	giallo	
Trevico-Turin: Voyage in Fiatnam	Ettore Scola	Paolo Turco, Stefania Casini	Drama	
Ultimo tango a Zagarol	Nando Cicero	Franco Franchi, Martine Beswick	Comedy	
We Want the Colonels	Mario Monicelli	Ugo Tognazzi, Claude Dauphin	Commedia all'italiana	Entered into the 1973 Cannes Film Festival
War Goddess	Terence Young	Rosanna Yanni, Luciana Paluzzi	adventure	
While There's War There's Hope	Alberto Sordi	Alberto Sordi, Silvia Monti	satirical comedy	
White Fang	Lucio Fulci	Franco Nero, Virna Lisi, Fernando Rey	Western	Italian-Spanish-French co-production
Woman Buried Alive	Aldo Lado	Agostina Belli, Fred Robsahm	Erotic-drama	
Women in Cell Block 7	Rino Di Silvestro	Anita Strindberg, Jenny Tamburi	Women in prison	

== Notes ==
=== References ===
- Curti, Roberto (2013). Italian Crime Filmography, 1968-1980. McFarland. ISBN 978-0786469765.
- Curti, Roberto (2017). Italian Gothic Horror Films, 1970–1979. McFarland. ISBN 978-1476629605.
- Curti, Robert (2016). Tonino Valerii: The Films. McFarland. ISBN 978-1476664682.
- Grant, Kevin (2011). Any Gun Can Play. Fab Press. ISBN 9781903254615.
- Kinnard, Roy; Crnkovich, Tony (2017). Italian Sword and Sandal Films, 1908-1990. McFarland. ISBN 978-1476662916.
- Sanderson, Mark (1996). Don't Look Now. London: British Film Institute. ISBN 0-85170-572-3.
- Smith, Gary A (2017). Vampire Films of the 1970s: Dracula to Blacula and Every Fang Between. McFarland. ISBN 978-1476625591.
