= Carlo Tuzii =

Italian director, writer and producer

Carlo Tuzii was an Italian director, writer and producer, best known for films such as La Gabbia and Ciao Gulliver.

== Career ==
He began his career with Rai, after winning a competition in 1956. In 1966 he left Rai and started Pont Royal Film TV. His first film was Ciao Gulliver with Lucia Bosè, Sydne Rome, Enrico Maria Salerno and Antonello Campodifiori. In 1967 the documentary Amen won the Venice film festival. In 1972 he directed Tutte le domeniche mattina the only movie interpreted by Sergio Endrigo.

He was one of the first music video creators, making videos for Pooh, Raffaella Carrà, Gianni Togni, Umberto Tozzi and others. He changed his career as producer for Edith Brook's il ragazzo con il violoncello and Faliero Rosati's Il momento dell'avventura" and "La Gabbia" with Miguel Bosè and from 1977 a collaboration with Vittorio Gassman with whom he made Gassman all'asta and Affabulazione by Pier Paolo Pasolini. In 1986 he produced Francesco Maselli's Storia d'amore. The film won the jury special prize at the Venice Film Festival. The following year he made Barbablù barbablù directed by Fabio Carpi.

== Filmography ==
- 1989 - Marco e Laura dieci anni fa
- 1988 - L'altro enigma
- 1987 - Barbablù, Barbablù
- 1986 - Love Story
- 1983 - Dieci registi italiani, dieci racconti italiani
- 1981 - " Questo incerto sentimento"di J.B Priestley
- 1980 - Venezia ultima serata di carnevale
- 1979 - Improvviso
- 1977 - La gabbia
- 1976 - Le cinque stagioni
- 1975 - L'uomo dei venti
- 1975 - Le avventure di Calandrino e Buffalmacco
- 1972 - Every Sunday Morning (Tutte Le Domeniche Mattina) - nominated in 1972 Venice International Film Festival
- 1971 - Ciao Gulliver (So Long Gulliver)
