= The Double (1971 film) =

- Italian film poster
- Directed by: Romolo Guerrieri
- Screenplay by: Sandro Continenza; Sauro Scavolini
- Story by: Sauro Scavolini
- Based on: La controfigura by Valentino Bompiani
- Produced by: Gino Mordini
- Starring: Jean Sorel; Lucia Bosè; Ewa Aulin; Silvano Tranquilli; Sergio Doria; Marilù Tolo
- Cinematography: Carlo Carlini
- Edited by: Carlo Reali
- Music by: Armando Trovajoli
- Production company: Claudia Cinematografica
- Distributed by: Consorzio Italiano Distributori Indipendenti Film
- Release date: 1971
- Running time: 88 minutes
- Country: Italy
- Language: Italian

The Double (Italian: La controfigura, lit. "The stand-in") also known as Love Inferno, is a 1971 Italian giallo film directed by Romolo Guerrieri. It stars Ewa Aulin (of Death Laid an Egg fame). The film is based on the novel La controfigura by Libero Bigiaretti.

== Plot ==
An architect named Frank is shot repeatedly by a middle-aged man in a parking garage. As he lays dying, a series of flashbacks out of order and with debatable accuracy lay out the events preceding the shooting.

Frank fails to maintain a career, living off a trust fund from his father's wealth invested in the family's brick manufacturing factory in Rome. The family is run by Frank's brother, but they're at risk of declaring bankruptcy once the workers unionize, and he demands Frank participate in trying to save the company.

Frank's honeymoon in Morocco with Lucia eventually leads to his derailment. Lucia is the daughter of a diplomat, so she began a relationship with Frank for financial comfort. While the couple are with Frank's friend Roger and his wife Marie, they all meet an American traveling hippie named Eddie. Lucia becomes attracted to Eddie, and by the time Lucia's mother Nora, who also travels the world, arrives to visit, Nora also fancies Eddie. Frank becomes obsessed with Nora and bitterly jealous of Eddie, having constant fantasies of having sex with or raping Nora and killing Eddie in various fashions.

Lucia and Frank feel a growing strain in their relationship. Frank grows paranoid over Lucia leaving him, to the point when she needs time alone, Frank briefly fears she's off with Roger. Additionally, Lucia sees Marie making passes at Frank, who doesn't reciprocate. Taking the excuse when walking Nora to where she's staying, Frank pushes his way through the door, chokes Nora on her bed, and rapes her. Nora gives Frank the cold shoulder from then on, especially with him harassing and following her around, but she never tells anyone about the rape.

Frank regularly rapes and degrades Lucia, especially to take his repressed lust after Nora out on Lucia with the intention of getting Lucia pregnant. When he finds she's taking birth control, he throws them out the window in a fight. Their fights grow worse, where Frank criticizes her social life and spending, and Lucia especially insults Frank for his career failures and ungentlemenly personality. As Frank grows more impotent, Lucia takes more opportunities to stop his abuse.

Frank soon finds out Nora is in Rome, all his attention on her to the point he tires to call her and get her to let him in his apartment. At and then outside the building, Frank sees a man revealed to be Frank's eventual shooter. He finds out she let Eddie stay in her apartment, so Frank tries to reach Nora through him. After a particularly concerning call, Frank rushes to the apartment, where he finds Eddie shot dead. Fearing Nora killed him, Frank cleans up the scene and disappears Eddie's remains at the family factory incinerator. When the police call Frank to the scene and question him, they show him the mystery man, who Frank lies he never saw before. When Frank finds out Nora was in Paris at the time of the murder, Frank is shocked by his cover-up being ultimately unnecessary.

The pieces slowly get put together, particularly when Nora returns to Rome to stay with Lucia and Frank: Eddie stayed at her apartment to hide from an esteemed physics professor, Eddie's obsessive ex-boyfriend Eddie broke up with. The professor shot Eddie for rejecting him, and once he knew Frank burned Eddie's remains, which the professor wanted to claim, he stalked and shot Frank as well. After a final mental picture of Frank's fantasy of having both Lucia and Nora to have sex with, the scene returns to Frank's last moments. He refuses to tell the professor where Eddie was burned, and the professor runs when some people come responding to the shot. Frank dies right at that moment.

== Cast ==
- Jean Sorel as Frank
- Lucia Bosé as Nora
- Ewa Aulin as Lucia
- Silvano Tranquilli as Roger
- Sergio Doria as Eddie
- Marilù Tolo as Marie
- Giacomo Rossi Stuart as Frank's Brother
- Antonio Pierfederici
- Pupo De Luca
- Bruno Boschetti
