= Violanta (1977 film) =

- Directed by: Daniel Schmid
- Written by: Daniel Schmid; Wolf Wondratschek
- Based on: Die Richterin by Conrad Ferdinand Meyer
- Produced by: Jordan Bojilov; Daniel Carillo; Max Dora; Eric Franck; Peter-Christian Fueter
- Starring: Maria Schneider; Lucia Bosé; Lou Castel; Ingrid Caven
- Cinematography: Renato Berta
- Edited by: Ila von Hasperg
- Music by: Peer Raben
- Production companies: Artco-Film; Condor Films
- Release date: 1977
- Running time: 95 minutes
- Country: Switzerland
- Language: French

Violanta is a 1977 Swiss historical drama film directed by Daniel Schmid and starring Lucia Bosé, Maria Schneider and Lou Castel. It is based on the novella Die Richterin by Conrad Ferdinand Meyer.

== Cast ==
- Maria Schneider as Laura
- Lucia Bosé as Donna Violanta
- Lou Castel as Silver
- Ingrid Caven as Alma
- François Simon as Simon
- Gérard Depardieu as Fortunat
- Raúl Gimenez as Adrian
- Luciano Simioni as David
- Marilu Marini
- Anne-Marie Blanc

== Bibliography ==
- Moliterno, Gino. The A to Z of Italian Cinema. Scarecrow Press, 2009.
