= Something Creeping in The Dark =

- Directed by: Mario Colucci
- Screenplay by: Mario Colucci
- Story by: Mario Colucci
- Produced by: Dino Fazio
- Starring: Farley Granger; Lucia Bosè; Giacomo Rossi Stuart
- Cinematography: Giuseppe Aquari
- Edited by: Enzo Micarelli
- Music by: Angelo Francesco Lavagnino
- Production company: Akla Productions S.p.A.
- Distributed by: Variety Distribution
- Release date: 15 April 1971 (Italy)
- Running time: 96 minutes
- Country: Italy
- Box office: ₤110.905 million

Something Creeping in The Dark (Italian: Qualcosa striscia nel buio) is a 1971 Italian horror film directed by Mario Colucci and starring Farley Granger and Lucia Bosè.

== Plot ==
After being stranded on a flooded road a group of people, including a homicidal killer and his two arresting police officers, take refuge in a deserted mansion which was once owned by a witch. There they find the sole inhabitant is the former caretaker and decide to hold a seance, which conjures up supernatural forces.

== Cast ==
- Farley Granger as Spike
- Lucia Bosè as Sylvia Forrest
- Giacomo Rossi Stuart as Donald Forres
- Stelvio Rosi as Dr. Williams (as Stan Cooper)
- Mia Genberg as Susan West
- Gianni Medici as Joe
- Giulia Rovai as Joe's Girl
- Angelo Francesco Lavagnino as Prof. Lawrence
- Dino Fazio as Insp. Wright
- Loredana Nusciak as Photo Model

== Production ==
The original script for Something Creeping in the Dark was written by director Mario Colucci in 1961 as La notte dei dannati, originally intended to be an Italian and German co-production directed by Primo Zeglio. Production was intended to begin in 1962, which never started. The film was shot between May and July 1970 at Incir-De Paolis studios in Rome.

== Release ==
Something Creeping in the Dark was distributed theatrically by D.D.F. in Italy on 15 April 1971. The film grossed a total of 110,905,000 Italian lire domestically. The film has also been released as Creeping in the Night as a promotional title in Ireland and Shadows in the Dark.

Something Creeping in the Dark was the final film of Colucci's to be released theatrically. Colucci began work on a giallo film in 1972 which would only be released in 2012.

== See also ==
- List of Italian films of 1971
