= Graziella Galvani =

Italian actress (1931–2022)

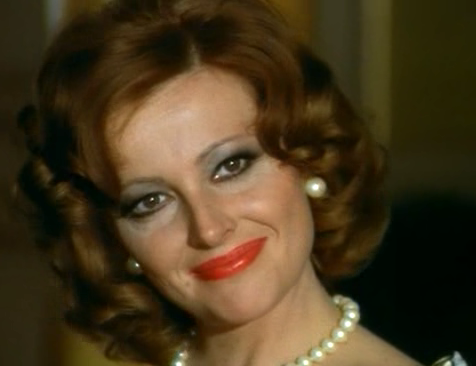
- Galvani in Seduction (1973)
- Born: 27 June 1931; Milan, Kingdom of Italy
- Died: 25 August 2022 (aged 91); Urbino, Marche, Italy
- Occupation: Actress
- Years active: 1957–1999
- Spouse: Giustino Durano (divorced)

Graziella Galvani (27 June 1931 – 25 August 2022) was an Italian stage, television and film actress.

== Life and career ==
Born in Milan, Galvani formed at the drama school of the Piccolo Teatro in her hometown, and participated in several plays directed by Giorgio Strehler in the early 1950s. She was mainly active on television, in TV-movies and series. She also appeared in a number of films, mainly cast in supporting roles.

Galvani was married to and later divorced from actor Giustino Durano.

== Selected filmography ==
- Kapò (1960)
- Ghosts of Rome (1961)
- Shivers in Summer (1963)
- Pierrot le Fou (1965)
- El Diablo también llora (1965)
- Nick Carter and Red Club (1965)
- Unknown Woman (1969)
- Open Letter to an Evening Daily (1970)
- Fiorina la vacca (1972)
- Seduction (1973)
- Miracles Still Happen (1974)
- La terrazza (1980)
- Tre colonne in cronaca (1990)
