= So Long Gulliver =

- Directed by: Carlo Tuzii
- Written by: Barbara Alberti; Antonella Campodifiori; Aldo Nicolai; Amedeo Pagoni; Carlo Tuzii
- Starring: Lucia Bosé; Antonello Campodifiori; Sydne Rome; Lorenzo Piani; Marco Ferreri; Lea Padovani; Enrico Maria Salerno
- Cinematography: Marcello Gatti
- Music by: Piero Piccioni
- Distributed by: Variety Distribution
- Release date: 14 November 1970
- Running time: 90 minutes
- Country: Italy
- Language: Italian

So Long Gulliver (Italian: Ciao Gulliver) is a 1970 Italian drama film directed by Carlo Tuzii and starring Lucia Bosé, Antonello Campodifiori and Sydne Rome.

== Cast ==
- Lucia Bosé as Evelyne
- Antonello Campodifiori as Daniele
- Sydne Rome as Gloria
- Lorenzo Piani as Friend
- Marco Ferreri as Priest
- Lea Padovani as Woman
- Enrico Maria Salerno as Boss

== Bibliography ==
- James Monaco. The Encyclopedia of Film. Perigee Books, 1991.
