= Holy God, Here Comes the Passatore! =

1973 film

- Directed by: Giuliano Carnimeo
- Written by: Gustavo Quintana; Nanda Migliozzi; Tito Carpi
- Starring: George Hilton; Edwige Fenech
- Cinematography: Pablo Ripoll
- Music by: Aldo Buonocore
- Distributed by: Variety Distribution
- Release date: 1973
- Country: Italy
- Language: Italian

Fuori uno sotto un altro... arriva il passatore (internationally released as Holy God, Here Comes the Passatore!, God Help Us, Here Comes the Passatore! and Holy God, It's the Passatore) is a 1973 Italian adventure-comedy film directed by Giuliano Carnimeo.

It is loosely based on the real-life events of Stefano Pelloni (1824-1851), an Italian highwayman known as "Il Passatore".

== Cast ==
- George Hilton as Stefano Pelloni, il Passatore
- Edwige Fenech as Mora
- Manuel Zarzo as Casimiro Casadei (credited as Manolo Zardo)
- Umberto D'Orsi as the Cardinal
- Sal Borgese as Mangiabisce
- Lucretia Love as Countess Amalia Casadei
- Jack Logan as Mattiazzo
- Helga Liné as Zaira
- Chris Huerta as Domandone
- Chris Avram as Zambelli
- Dante Maggio as the robbed priest

== See also ==
- Bullet for Stefano (1947)
- List of Italian films of 1973
