= Arcana (film) =

- Directed by: Giulio Questi
- Screenplay by: Franco Arcalli; Giulio Questi
- Story by: Franco Arcalli; Giulio Questi
- Starring: Lucia Bosé; Maurizio Degli Esposti; Tina Aumont
- Cinematography: Dario Di Palma
- Edited by: Franco Arcalli
- Music by: Romolo Grano; Berto Pisano
- Production company: Produzione Palumbo di Palumbo Gaspare
- Distributed by: Distribuzione Dinamica Films (D.D.F.)
- Release date: 1972

Arcana is a 1972 Italian horror-drama film written and directed by Giulio Questi.

== Plot ==
In a neighborhood in Milan, Ms. Tarantino, a widow, lives with her son and dedicates herself to practices of spiritualism. Convinced that his mother knows the true secrets of magic and not just some tricks, the son forces her to reveal them. He will use them against a young girl to be married, Marisa, and he will also spread panic in the neighbourhood, causing accidents of all kinds.

== Cast ==
- Lucia Bosé: Miss Tarantino
- Maurizio Degli Esposti: The Son
- Tina Aumont: Marisa

== Production ==
Giulio Questi's new film was first announced in mid-1970 by Lucia Bosé who announced her next film would be titled Amanda a mysterious mother, a fortune teller, and a sorceress." Filming was done in Milan between June and July 1971 with the title changed to Arcana.

== Release ==
Arcana was released in 1972. Film historian Roberto Curti described the film as a commercial disaster as the distributor D.D.F. went bankrupt when they were still printing copies of the film. Only five prints of the film were distributed across Italy and it did not play in any major cities.
