= Ewa Aulin =

Swedish actress

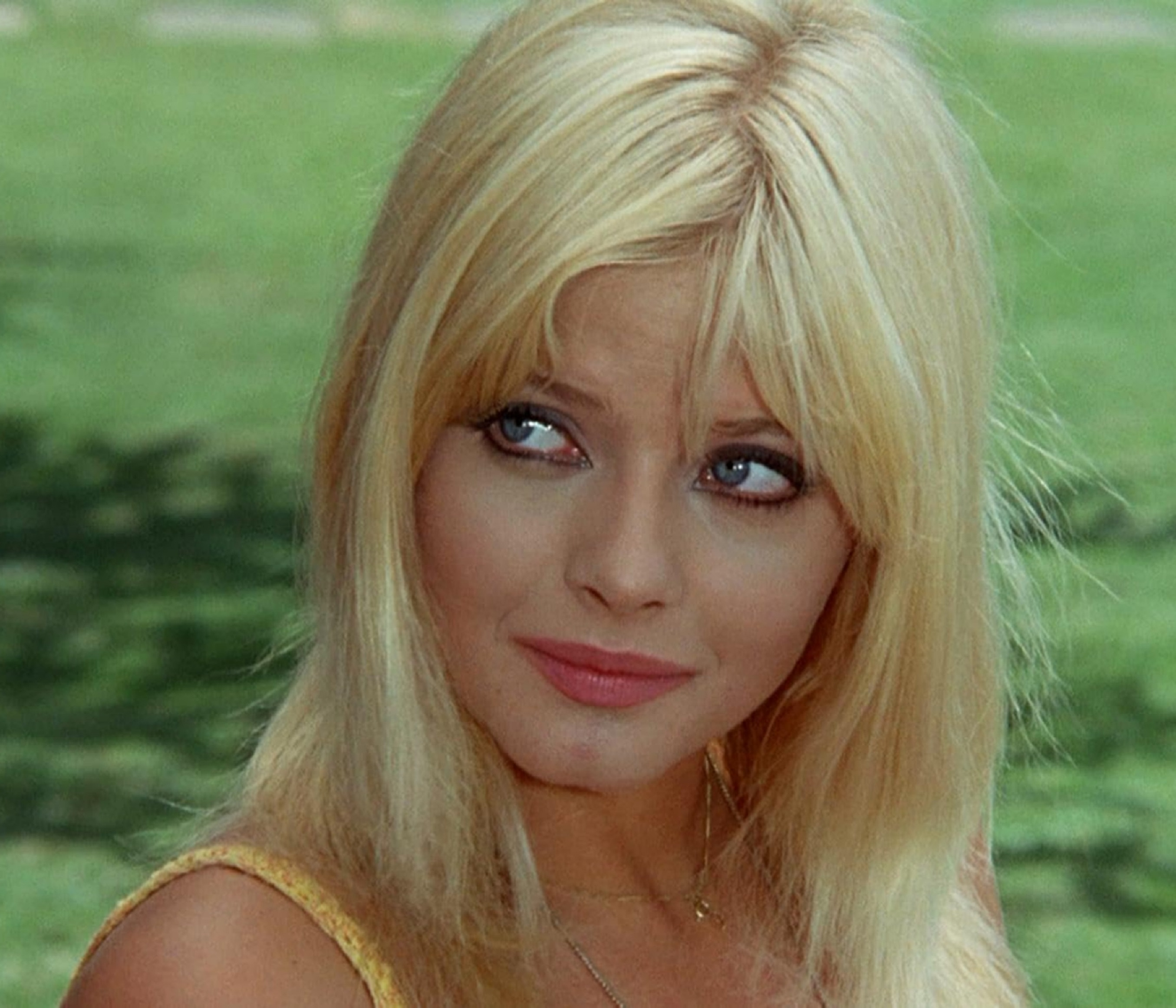
- Ewa Aulin in Death Laid an Egg (1968)
- Born: Ewa Birgitta Aulin; 13 February 1950 (age 76); Landskrona, Sweden
- Occupation: Actress
- Years active: 1965–1974, 1996
- Spouses: John W. Shadow (m. 1968; div. 1972); Cesare Paladino (m. 1974, divorced)
- Children: 4

Ewa Birgitta Aulin (born 13 February 1950) is a Swedish former actress who appeared in a number of Italian and some American films in the 1960s and 1970s. She is remembered for playing the title character in the cult film Candy where she appeared with John Huston, Ringo Starr, Walter Matthau, James Coburn, Richard Burton and Marlon Brando. She is known to horror film fans for starring in Death Smiles on a Murderer, Death Laid an Egg, and Ceremonia Sangrienta (aka Legend of Blood Castle).

== Biography ==
Ewa Aulin won the title of Miss Teen Sweden in 1965 at age 15 and was then approached by Gunnar Fischer, who asked her to appear as the young girl in his short film Djävulens instrument (The Devil's Instrument). She subsequently represented Sweden in the first-ever Miss Teen International pageant, on 6 April 1966 in Hollywood, California. She won, earning the title of Miss Teen International 1966.

Aulin's success as Miss Teen International attracted attention not only in Sweden, where she appeared on the popular entertainment show Hylands hörna, but also in Italy, and in 1967, at age 16, she made her feature-film debut with a supporting role in the comedy Don Giovanni in Sicilia (Don Juan in Sicily), based on the novel by Vitaliano Brancati. This film led to a movie career for Aulin that would last just over six years, starting with leading roles in two giallo films: the pop art-style Col cuore in gola (With Heart in Mouth, 1967) directed by Tinto Brass, and the avant-garde La morte ha fatto l'uovo (Death Laid an Egg, 1968) directed by Giulio Questi. Aulin's co-star in both these films was Jean-Louis Trintignant.

In late 1967, Aulin was cast as the title character in her most famous film, the American-Italian-French co-production Candy, directed by Christian Marquand. Aulin learned that she had the role only the day before filming began in early December 1967. The story involves Aulin's character's search for the meaning of life, in which she keeps encountering, and getting sexually involved with, many very different men. The film did poorly in America and failed to make an international star out of Aulin; it was more successful in Europe and in recent years has gained some popularity as a cult film. Aulin, in particular, received praise for her performance in the film, earning a Golden Globe nomination for Most Promising Newcomer. As a consequence of her appearance in this role, Aulin was stereotyped as something of a "blonde nymphet" by people in the film industry.

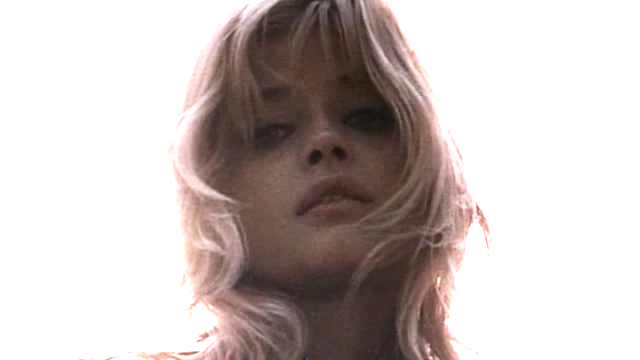
Aulin in Col cuore in gola (1966)

The only other American film Aulin appeared in was Start the Revolution Without Me (1970), a comedy of errors set during the French Revolution. Aulin played a supporting role as Christina of Belgium, and the film starred Gene Wilder and Donald Sutherland, but like Candy, the film did little business in America.

Later that year, Aulin starred in the experimental film Microscopic Liquid Subway to Oblivion, which was written and directed by Aulin's husband, who used family money to set himself up as a film producer, using the Anglo-sounding stage name John Shadow. They had married secretly in Mexico in early 1968. The film itself was released hardly anywhere in the world. After this, Aulin only appeared in Italian films. Many of her films were sex comedies set in the Middle Ages but she also managed to make more impact in drama and thriller films. She played one of the leads in the giallo The Double (1971) directed by Romolo Guerrieri as well as leading roles in Quando l'amore è sensualità (When Love Is Lust, 1973) and Jorge Grau's Ceremonia Sangrienta/ The Legend of Blood Castle (1973). She played an undead avenging angel in Joe D'Amato's gothic horror film La morte ha sorriso all'assassino (Death Smiles on a Murderer, 1973) and also appeared in the thriller Una vita lunga un giorno (Long Lasting Days, 1973). Aulin and John Shadow divorced in 1972.

In 1974, 24-year-old Aulin married wealthy real-estate developer Cesare Paladino, and they went on to have two daughters. One daughter, Olivia Paladino, later became the partner of Giuseppe Conte, 58th prime minister of Italy. Aulin abandoned her acting career, enrolled at university, and became a schoolteacher. Since her retirement, she has appeared in only one other film, Mi fai un favore (Stella's Favor, 1996), in a supporting role.

== Filmography ==
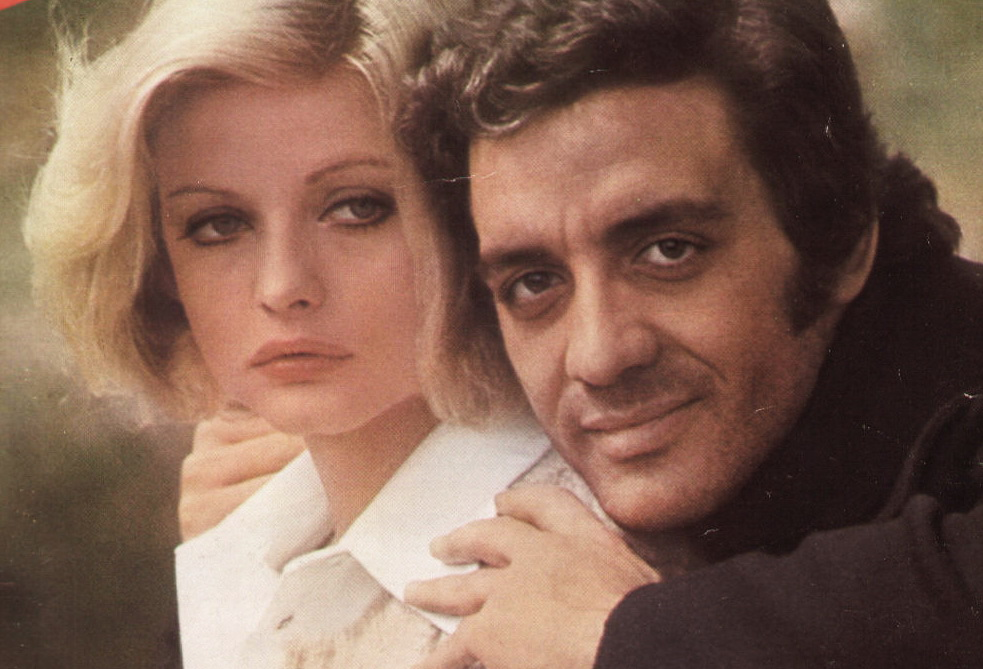
Ewa Aulin with Italian singer Mino Reitano (1973).

- Don Juan in Sicily (1967)
- Col cuore in gola (1967)
- Candy (1968)
- Death Laid an Egg (1968)
- Start the Revolution Without Me (1970)
- Microscopic Liquid Subway to Oblivion (1970)
- The Double (1971)
- This Kind of Love (1972)
- Rosina Fumo viene in città... per farsi il corredo (1972)
- Fiorina la vacca (1972)
- My Pleasure Is Your Pleasure (1973)
- Death Smiles on a Murderer (1973)
- Ceremonia sangrienta (1973; aka Legend of Blood Castle)
- When Love Is Lust (1973)
- Long Lasting Days (1973)
- Stella's Favor (1996)
