= Dove volano i corvi d'argento =

- Directed by: Piero Livi
- Written by: Aldo Serio
- Starring: Corrado Pani; Jenny Tamburi
- Cinematography: Angelo Bevilacqua
- Music by: Egisto Macchi; Claudio Tallino
- Release date: 1977
- Language: Italian

Dove volano i corvi d'argento (Italian for "Where The Silver Crows Fly") is a 1977 Italian crime-drama film written and directed by Piero Livi and starring Corrado Pani, Jenny Tamburi, Flavio Bucci and Renzo Montagnani.

== Plot ==
A young Italian man who witnesses a kidnapping is killed by criminals. The victim's brother, a Milan metalworker, is then pressured by family and friends to take revenge on his brother's killers.

== Cast ==
- Corrado Pani as Istevene
- Jenny Tamburi as Giovannangela
- Flavio Bucci as Simbula
- Renzo Montagnani as Maineddu
- Giampiero Albertini as Istevene's Father
- Regina Bianchi as Istevene's Mother
- Piero Gerlini as Maresciallo
- Paolo Malco as Podda
- Mariangela Giordano as Basilia
- Massimo De Rossi as Stintino
- Bruno Corazzari as Killer
