= Sins Without Intentions =

1975 film by Theo Campanelli

- Directed by: Theo Campanelli
- Written by: Theo Campanelli; Cristiano Auer
- Starring: Jenny Tamburi; Gabriele Tinti
- Cinematography: Emilio Bestetti
- Music by: Stelvio Cipriani
- Distributed by: Variety Distribution
- Release date: 1975
- Language: Italian

Sins Without Intentions (Italian: Peccato senza malizia) is a 1975 Italian erotic-drama film written and directed by Theo Campanelli and starring Jenny Tamburi, Gabriele Tinti and Luigi Pistilli.

== Plot ==
When she reaches adulthood, Stefania leaves the orphanage at Ascoli Piceno where she was raised and goes to live with her stepfather. He is a humble fisherman who lives in a shack near the sea. He abuses her and she runs away. Stefania ends up living in the home of Laura, one of the teachers at the college. A relationship develops between Stefania and Laura. Later, Stephanie attends a painting school and falls in love with her teacher, Maurizio. Laura, now obsessed with Stefania, ends her own life.

== Cast ==
- Jenny Tamburi as Stefania
- Gabriele Tinti as Maurizio
- Luigi Pistilli as Stefania's Stepfather
- Francesca Romana Coluzzi as Paola
- Cristiano Auer as Director of 'Anatema'
