= La professoressa di lingue =

1976 film by Demofilo Fidani

- Poster
- Directed by: Demofilo Fidani
- Release date: 1976
- Language: Italian

La professoressa di lingue (lit. The languages teacher) is a 1976 Italian sex comedy directed by Demofilo Fidani. The film is known in English as On the Tip of the Tongue.

== Plot ==
The film is set in Perugia. Michele has to learn foreign languages to overcome his stuttering. His newly assigned private tutor is a seducing woman called Pamela.

== Cast ==
- Femi Benusssi as Pamela
- Walter Romagnoli as Michele
- Pupo De Luca as Aristide, Michele's wealthy father

== Reception ==
The film has been noted for its soundtrack by Lallo Gori: "that begins lightly with apparently simple themes given surprising development throughout the course of the movie, becoming almost difficult to recognize by the end of the film, wide and open". The film itself received rather negative retrospective response.
