= Glauco Mauri =

Italian actor and theatre director (1930–2024)

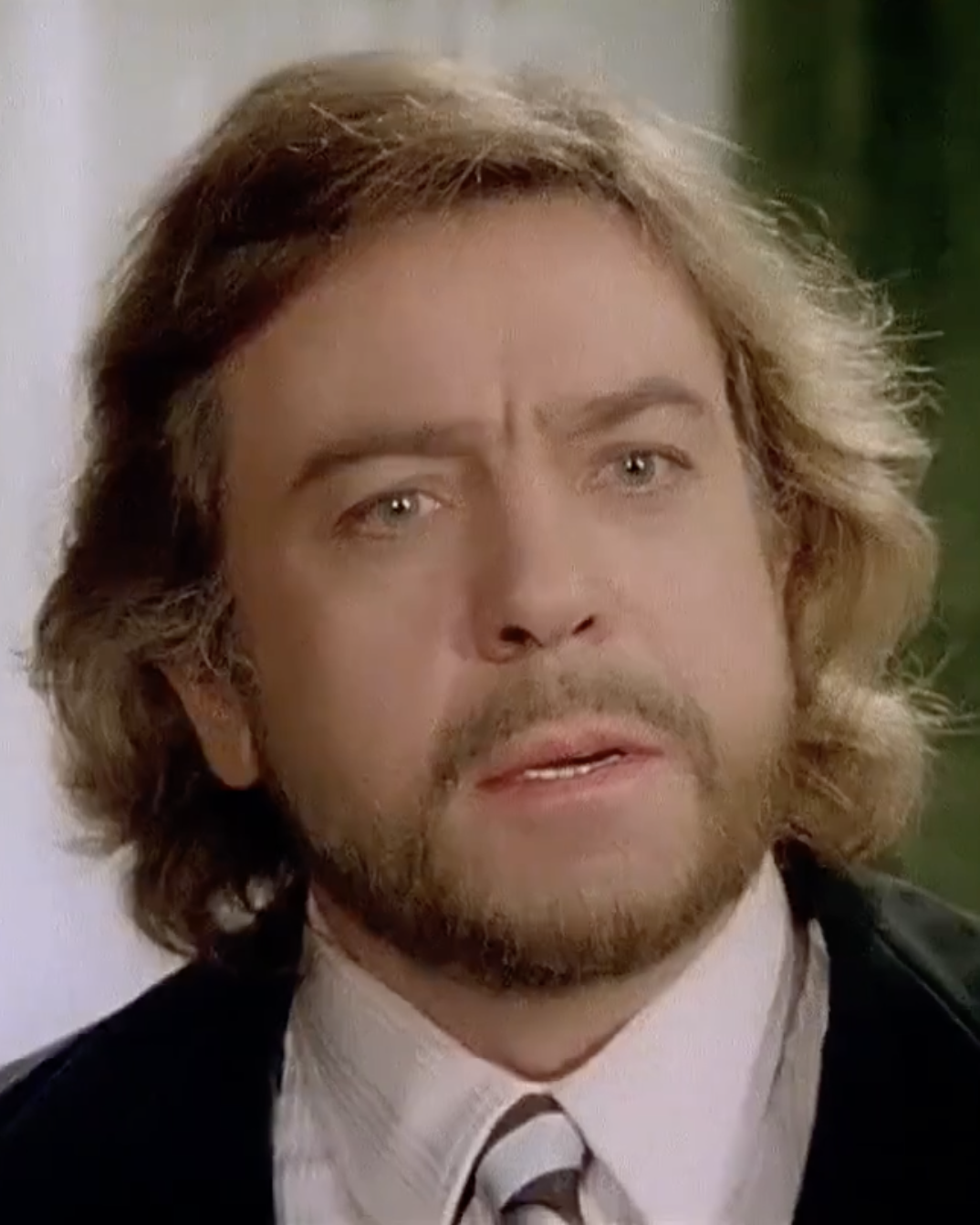
- Mauri in Deep Red (1975)
- Born: 1 October 1930; Pesaro, Kingdom of Italy
- Died: 28 September 2024 (aged 93); Rome, Italy
- Occupations: Actor; theatre director
- Years active: 1953–2024

Glauco Mauri (1 October 1930 – 28 September 2024) was an Italian actor and theatre director.

== Biography ==
After studying at the Accademia d'Arte Drammatica, he gave his stage debut in 1953. In 1961, he co-founded the "Compagnia dei Quattro" theatre company, which performed plays by Shakespeare, Beckett, Pasolini, García Lorca and Ionesco. Together with Roberto Sturno, he founded the "Compagnia Glauco Mauri Roberto Sturno" in 1981, producing plays by or based on Shakespeare, Dostoevsky, Goethe, Goldoni and others.

As an actor, he also appeared on television, on radio and in films by directors such as Marco Bellocchio, Liliana Cavani and Dario Argento.

Mauri died in Rome on 28 September 2024, at the age of 93.

== Selected filmography ==
- 1964: La costanza della ragione – Luigi
- 1967: China Is Near – Vittorio
- 1971: L'ospite – Piero
- 1975: Deep Red – Prof. Giordani
- 1978: Ecce bombo – Michele's father

== Stage ==
- 1952: Macbeth
- 2024: Interno Bernhard - Minetti. Ritratto di un artista da vecchio
