= L'ospite =

1971 Italian film

- Theatrical release poster
- Directed by: Liliana Cavani
- Written by: Liliana Cavani
- Starring: Lucia Bosè; Glauco Mauri
- Cinematography: Giulio Albonico
- Edited by: Andreina Casini; Giovanni Baragli (supervising editor)
- Music by: Gioacchino Rossini
- Production companies: Lotar Film; RAI
- Distributed by: Sacis
- Release date: 1971 (Venice Film Festival)
- Running time: 93 minutes
- Country: Italy
- Language: Italian

L'ospite, English title The Guest, (Note: "Guest" is the term used by the psychiatric hospital's personnel when referring to an inmate.) is a 1971 Italian drama film directed by Liliana Cavani and starring Lucia Bosè. It follows a woman who, released from a mental hospital after twenty years, tries in vain to fit into society.

== Plot ==
Writer Piero does research in a psychiatric hospital for his next novel. He finds several deficiencies in the treatment of the patients, but hears only self-justifications and criticism when he confronts the doctors with his observations. He takes a particular interest in the case of Anna, a woman who was hospitalised with depression after the death of her adored cousin twenty years ago. The only person in the institute to whom Anna feels an emotional bond is Luciano, a fellow inmate who maintains in a catatonic state.

Shortly after, Anna is discharged and entrusted to her brother Renato, to the dismay of her brother's wife. Her attempts to make social contacts fail. During a visit by the couple next door, Anna recounts the husband's sexual advances towards her, for which she is slapped by the disbelieving Renato. She runs away and hides in her uncle's abandoned villa. There, in her fantasy, she relives her relationship with her cousin (who appears in the shape of Luciano), with both taking the roles of Pelléas and Mélisande. Eventually, she is found by the police and taken back to the hospital. The last scene shows Anna comforting the motionless Luciano.

== Cast ==
- Lucia Bosè as Anna
- Glauco Mauri as Piero
- Peter Gonzales as Luciano
- Alvaro Piccardi as Renato
- Giancarlo Caio as the doctor
- Giampiero Frondini (credited as Gian Piero Frondini)
- Alfio Galardi
- Maddalena Gillia
- Maria Luisa Salmaso
- Lorenzo Piani

== Production and release ==
Cavani had the idea for L'ospite after a visit to a mental hospital. It was produced by the Italian radio and television station RAI, shot on 16 mm film in black and white and blown up to 35 mm film. According to Cavani, the film was made on a low budget with all participants, including Bosè, working for free.

L'ospite was presented at the 1971 Venice International Film Festival. After a theatrical release the following year, it was broadcast on national television on 24 May 1973.

== Reception ==
The day after the film's TV presentation, Ugo Buzzolan of La Stampa praised Cavani's "artistic and civil commitment" and Bosè's performance.

== Awards ==
- Targa AIACE (L'Associazione Italiana Amici Cinema d'Essai), 1972
- Timone d'oro, 1972
