= Pupo De Luca =

Italian actor and jazz musician

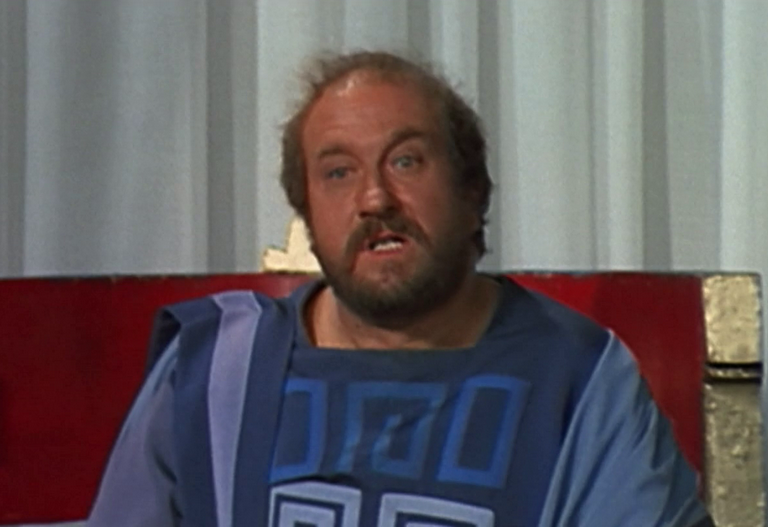
- De Luca in Elena sì... ma di Troia (1973)
- Born: 18 December 1924; Milan, Italy
- Died: 18 December 2006 (aged 82); Lanzarote, Spain
- Occupation(s): Actor; Musician

Giovanni "Pupo" De Luca (18 December 1924 – 18 December 2006) was an Italian actor and jazz musician.

== Life and career ==
Born in Milan, after the World War II De Luca started his career in the theaters of his hometown, performing in revues, dialect theatre, and dramas. He had his breakout in the late 1960s, with the role of Fritz in the RAI TV-series Nero Wolfe. In films, he was mainly active as a character actor, except for a number of main roles in a few low budget comedies.

De Luca was also well known as a jazz drummer, and his collaborations include Chet Baker, Franco Cerri, Enrico Intra, Bud Shank, and Gianni Basso. With Intra and Gianni Buongiovanni he is considered a "founding father" of the cabaret Derby Club in his hometown.

De Luca retired from showbusiness in the early 1990s and moved to Lanzarote, Canary Islands, where he died in 2006, aged 82 years old.

== Filmography ==
Year	Title	Role	Notes
1964	La vita agra	Don Torneri	
1966	Wake Up and Die		
1968	Bandits in Milan	Uomo della 1100	
1968	Seven Times Seven	TV Journalist	Uncredited
1970	Una storia d'amore	Doctor	
1971	Long Live Robin Hood	Wrong Priest	
1971	Vacation		
1971	The Double	The Police Commissioner	
1971	That's How We Women Are	Guest of Alberta	(segment "Il mondo cammina")
1971	Roma Bene	Third lover of Dede Marescalli	
1971	Trinity Is Still My Name	Prior	
1972	The Eroticist	Bugging Officer	
1972	Decameron nº 2 - Le altre novelle del Boccaccio	Puccio	
1972	Le calde notti del Decameron	Fra' Gerbino	
1972	Decameron proibitissimo (Boccaccio mio statte zitto)	Fra' Pasquale	
1972	Novelle galeotte d'amore		
1972	Man of the East	Prison Director	
1972	Decameroticus	Husband of Elisa	
1973	House of 1000 Pleasures	Samandar	
1973	Maria Rosa la guardona		
1973	My Pleasure Is Your Pleasure		
1973	Primo tango a Roma - Storia d'amore e d'alchimia	Olimpio Orsini	
1973	Special Killers	Cabbie	
1973	Mamma... li turchi!	Biscardo	
1973	I giochi proibiti de l'Aretino Pietro	Francesco de' Bardi	(segment "4 Wives")
1973	Patroclooo! E il soldato Camillone, grande grosso e frescone	Nardi	
1973	Elena sì... ma di Troia	Menelaos	
1973	Bruna, formosa, cerca superdotato		
1974	Di Tresette ce n'è uno, tutti gli altri son nessuno	Director's Assistant	Uncredited
1974	Charleston	Restaurant Owner	
1974	Carnalità	Aurelio / Orsani's Butler	
1974	The Balloon Vendor	Antiquarian	
1974	Manone il ladrone	Frate	
1974	La svergognata	Nino Bernardi	
1975	La cognatina	Parish Priest	
1975	L'ammazzatina	Brigadiere Bragolin	
1975	The Sex Machine		
1975	Le dolci zie	don Fiorello	
1975	Hallucination Strip	Assistente del commissario	
1976	La professoressa di lingue	Aristide Toppetti	
1976	Terror in Rome	Comm. Carli	
1976	Il compromesso... erotico (Menage a quattro)	Don Camillo	
1977	Amore all'arrabbiata		
1978	Ring	Gegè	
1984	Domani mi sposo	Father of Arturo	
1987	Teresa	Prior	
1990	Towards Evening	Judge	
