= Renato Montalbano =

Italian actor (1931–2019)

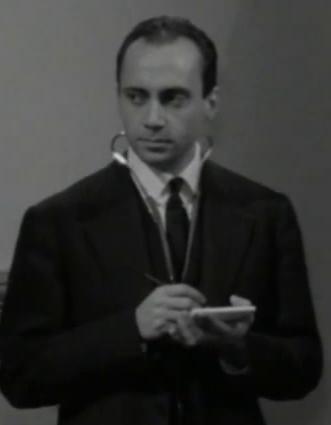
- Montalbano in Psycosissimo (1961)
- Born: 17 May 1931; Catania, Italy
- Died: 18 March 2019 (aged 87); Rome, Italy
- Occupation: Actor

Renato Montalbano (17 May 1931 – 18 March 2019) was an Italian character actor.

== Life and career ==
Born in Catania, in 1955 Montalbano abandoned his university studies in medicine to attend at the Centro Sperimentale di Cinematografia in Rome, from which he graduated in 1957. He made his film debut in 1956, and he was among the most active character actors in Italian cinema for about thirty years, alternating genre films and auteur films. Montalbano was also very active on television, where he debuted in 1958 and appeared in dozens of television films and miniseries, often in prominent roles. He died in Rome on 18 March 2019, at the age of 87.

== Selected filmography ==
- Divisione Folgore (1954) - Paratrooper
- La grande savana (1955) - Enrico
- Roland the Mighty (1956) - Gualtiero
- El Alamein (1957) - Parachutist (uncredited)
- The Dragon's Blood (1957) - Gerenot
- La zia d'America va a sciare (1957)
- Slave Women of Corinth (1958) - Osco
- A Man of Straw (1958)
- Some Like It Cold (1960)
- Mamma Roma (1962)
- The Hot Port of Hong Kong (1962)
- The Golden Arrow (1962)
- Revolt of the Praetorians (1964)
- The Two Gladiators (1964)
- The Magnificent Gladiator (1964)
- Lightning Bolt (1965)
- The Mandrake (1965)
- Hard Time for Princes (1965)
- James Tont operazione D.U.E. (1966)
- Assault on the State Treasure (1967)
- Blood and Bullets (1976)
- Jesus of Nazareth (1977, TV Mini-Series) - Jairus
