= Col cuore in gola =

1967 film by Tinto Brass

Deadly Sweet
- Directed by: Tinto Brass
- Screenplay by: Tinto Brass; Francesca Longo; Pierre Levy
- Based on: Il sepolcro di carta by Sergio Donati
- Produced by: Luigi Carpentieri; Ermanno Donati
- Starring: Jean-Louis Trintignant; Ewa Aulin; Roberto Bisacco; Vira Silenti; Charles Kohler
- Cinematography: Silvano Ippoliti
- Edited by: Tinto Brass
- Music by: Armando Trovajoli
- Production companies: Panda; Les Films Corona
- Release dates: 1967 (Italy); 19 April 1969 (France)
- Running time: 107 minutes
- Countries: Italy; France

Col cuore in gola (lit. 'With Heart in Mouth') is a 1967 giallo film directed by Tinto Brass. It is loosely based on the novel Il sepolcro di carta (lit. The Paper Tomb) written by Sergio Donati. The film was storyboarded by cartoonist Guido Crepax. It has been released under several titles, including Deadly Sweet and I Am What I Am.

== Plot ==
A French actor named Bernard (Jean-Louis Trintignant) comes across a beautiful young woman (Ewa Aulin) bending over the corpse of a murdered nightclub owner in London. He believes her that she is innocent of the crime, and runs off with her to protect her from a group of criminal types who are stalking her.

== Cast ==
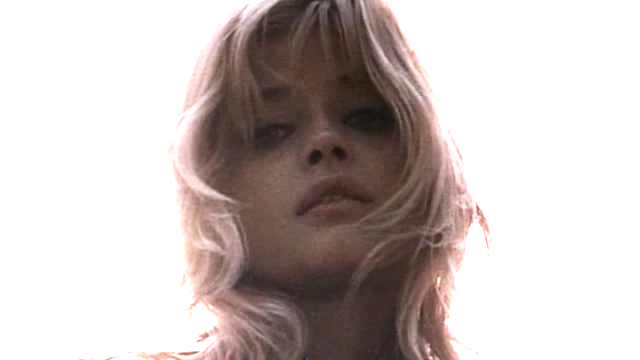
Ewa Aulin in the film

- Jean-Louis Trintignant as Bernard
- Ewa Aulin as Jane
- Vira Silenti as Martha
- Roberto Bisacco as David
- Charles Kohler as Jerome
- Luigi Bellini as "Jelly-Roll"
- David Prowse as Jelly-Roll's Partner (uncredited)
- Janet Street-Porter as Salon Receptionist (uncredited)

== Production ==
Col cuore in gola was adapted from the paperback novel Il sepolcro di carta (1955) by Sergio Donati. Brass noted he was not very fond of the novel, and his producers wanted Jean-Louis Trintignant as the lead. On meeting Trintignant, he told him a different story than that of the novel, which led him to accept the role. Brass then sent over the actual script, stating that he had changed his mind. The film's working title at this point was Enigma.

Brass did later change the plot, moving the story's location from Rome to London, noting that "London represented what Paris had represented before it: the place of transgression and freedom. Lots of things were happening. The Beatles were only one of them. It was Europe's liveliest urban center."

Brass expressed that he "wanted to make a film in ideograms - like in Chinese writing, where a symbol indicates a whole concept. So I did not film a horse, but an eye, or a spur. The characters seem two-dimensional, as in a comic." In 1966, director Tinto Brass contacted Guido Crepax to draw the storyboards for the Cuol cuore in gola. Crepax created color storyboards, even though he was used to working in black-and-white. For the cinematographer, Brass noted that his previous director of photography, Bruno Barcarol, had died, and he needed a new one. Brass later chose Silvano Ippoliti, as he reminded him a bit of Barcarol.

The film was Brass' only giallo film, and was influenced by the pop art movement. This is seen in Trintignant's character's home, which is decorated with older popular Hollywood actors, and the use of split screen matting to have a look similar to that of a comic strip. The film also switches between black-and-white and color, which Brass later explained was done out of necessity rather than any artistic statement, noting that some scenes required more light than the crew was able to provide, which led to scenes being filmed in black and white.

== Release ==
Col cuore in gola was released in Italy in 1967 where it was not a commercial success. It was released in France on 19 April 1969. It has been released under the titles Le cœur aux lèvres and En cinquième vitesse (lit. 'The Fifth Gear').

The film was shown in the United States in Portland, Oregon on 7 September 1969. The film was released in the United States as I Am What I Am on the Cult Epics label.

== See also ==
- List of French films of 1967
- List of Italian films of 1967
