= My Pleasure Is Your Pleasure =

1973 film by Claudio Racca

- Directed by: Claudio Racca
- Written by: Claudio Racca
- Produced by: Anselmo Parrinello; Paolo Prestano
- Starring: Ewa Aulin; Femi Benussi; Barbara Bouchet; Sylva Koscina
- Cinematography: Claudio Racca
- Edited by: Marcello Malvestito
- Music by: Franco Bixio
- Release date: 1973
- Language: Italian

My Pleasure Is Your Pleasure (Italian: Il tuo piacere è il mio) is a 1973 commedia sexy all'italiana anthology film written and directed by the cinematographer Claudio Racca, at his writing and directorial debut. It is loosely based on Honoré de Balzac's novel Les Cent Contes drolatiques (1832–1837).

== Cast ==
- Ewa Aulin: Marquise Cavalcanti
- Femi Benussi: Countess Joselita Esteban De Fierro / Rosalia
- Lionel Stander: Marquis Cavalcanti / Cardinal of Ragusa
- Barbara Bouchet: Prostitute
- Erna Schürer: Grand Duchess
- Aldo Giuffrè: Grand Duke
- Sylva Koscina: Dyer's Wife
- Leopoldo Trieste: Dyer
- Marisa Solinas: Maid of the Grand Duchess
- Anna Maestri
- Umberto Raho: Treasurer of the Grand Duke
- Pupo De Luca
- Giacomo Furia: Bishop of Coira

== See also ==
- List of Italian films of 1973
