= Start the Revolution Without Me =

1970 film by Bud Yorkin

- Promotional poster for the film
- Directed by: Bud Yorkin
- Written by: Lawrence J. Cohen; Fred Freeman
- Produced by: Bud Yorkin
- Starring: Gene Wilder; Donald Sutherland; Hugh Griffith; Jack MacGowran; Billie Whitelaw; Orson Welles; Victor Spinetti; Ewa Aulin
- Cinematography: Jean Tournier
- Edited by: Ferris Webster
- Music by: John Addison
- Production company: Norbud Productions
- Distributed by: Warner Bros.-Seven Arts
- Release date: February 4, 1970
- Running time: 90 minutes
- Country: United States
- Language: English

Start the Revolution Without Me is a 1970 American period comedy film directed by Bud Yorkin, and starring Gene Wilder, Donald Sutherland, Hugh Griffith, Jack MacGowran, Billie Whitelaw, Orson Welles (playing himself as narrator) and Victor Spinetti. The film is set in revolutionary France where two peasants are mistaken for the famous Corsican Brothers. The film is considered a parody of a number of works of historical fiction about the French Revolution and French history in general, including A Tale of Two Cities (1859) by Charles Dickens and two works by Alexandre Dumas, The Corsican Brothers (1844) and The Man in the Iron Mask (1847).

== Plot ==
Two sets of identical twins are accidentally switched at birth. One pair, Phillipe and Pierre DeSisi, are aristocratic and haughty, while the other, Charles and Claude Coupé, are poor and dim-witted. On the eve of the French Revolution, both sets find themselves entangled in palace intrigue.

== Cast ==
- Gene Wilder as Phillipe / Claude
- Donald Sutherland as Pierre / Charles
- Hugh Griffith as Louis XVI
- Jack MacGowran as Jacques
- Billie Whitelaw as Marie Antoinette
- Victor Spinetti as Duke d'Escargot
- Ewa Aulin as Princess Christina
- Helen Fraser as Mimi Montage
- Rosalind Knight as Helene de Sisi
- Harry Fowler as Marcel
- Murray Melvin as Blind Man
- Graham Stark as Andre Coupe
- George A. Cooper as Dr. Duval
- Denise Coffey as Anne Duval
- Orson Welles as The Narrator

== Reception ==
Vincent Canby of The New York Times panned the film, writing: "The performances are desperate, without being in any way memorable, thus matching the wit of the screenplay."

Arthur D. Murphy of Variety called the film "disappointing," finding that "[t]he final mix never jells, despite some occasional, and genuine, hilarity ... There is a sluggishness and heaviness to some of the direction when the script is in good shape; and when the direction has lightness and zest, the script is in a slump."

Gene Siskel gave the film three-and-a-half stars out of four and declared it "a terribly funny parody of the over-stuffed 18th century costume dramas that crowd the vaults of many a major studio."

Charles Champlin of the Los Angeles Times praised the film as "an absolutely georgeous piece of costume kookery, a dazzling and sustained farce which is also a mad, affectionate tribute to every epee epic, every sabre-and-sex, bodice-and-bodkin historical melodrama anybody ever saw."

Gary Arnold of The Washington Post wrote that the film "is not without some oafish and wrong-headed touches, but on the whole it's a witty and engaging picture, an affectionate and competent revival of traditional farce."

Richard Combs of The Monthly Film Bulletin thought that Sutherland and Wilder "carry off an assortment of roles in lively fashion," but "the pacing of the film as a whole is unpleasantly jarring."

== Awards ==
The film's screenwriters Fred Freeman and Lawrence J. Cohen were nominated for a WGA award for Best Comedy Written Directly for the Screen in 1971.

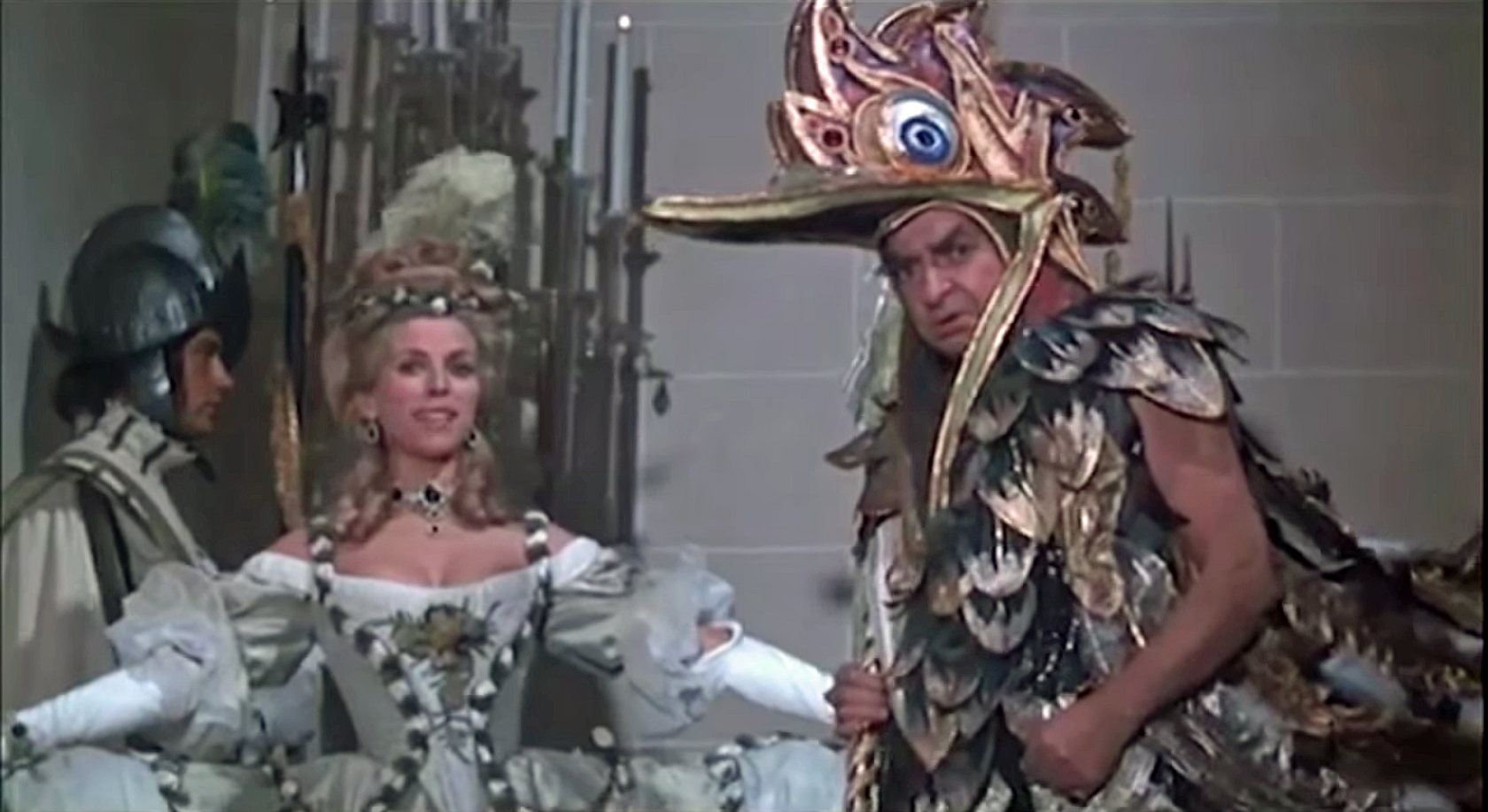
Billie Whitelaw and Hugh Griffith as the king and queen of France
