= Fiorina la vacca =

1972 film by Vittorio De Sisti

- Directed by: Vittorio De Sisti
- Written by: Vittorio De Sisti; Fabio Pittorru
- Story by: Ruzante (play)
- Starring: Felice Andreasi; Janet Agren; Mario Carotenuto
- Cinematography: Erico Menczer
- Edited by: Gabriella Cristiani
- Release date: 30 March 1973
- Running time: 103 min
- Country: Italy
- Language: Italian

Fiorina la vacca (Fiorina the Cow) is a 1973 commedia sexy all'italiana directed by Vittorio De Sisti. The film, loosely based on several works by Ruzante, is an example of the Decamerotici genre popular in the early 1970s.

== Plot ==
The film is set in the 16th century and tells the story of a cow named Fiorina, sold by a farmer looking to seek his fortune as a mercenary. From this point, the cow changes hands, sometimes legitimately and illegitimately. Finally, the cow was sold to a rich man. In addition, he wishes to buy the vendor woman who shares its name.

== Cast ==
- Janet Ågren as Tazia
- Gastone Moschin as Ruzante
- Renzo Montagnani as Menico
- Ornella Muti as Teresa
- Jenny Tamburi as Zanetta
- Ewa Aulin as Giacomina
- Felice Andreasi as Michelon
- Rodolfo Baldini as lover of Teresa
- Mario Carotenuto as padron Beolco
- Angela Covello as Fiorina
- Graziella Galvani as Betta
- Piero Vida as Nane
- Renzo Marignano as Massaro di Beolco
