= Nathalie Granger =

1972 film by Marguerite Duras

- Directed by: Marguerite Duras
- Written by: Marguerite Duras
- Produced by: Jean-Michel Carré; Luc Moullet
- Starring: Lucia Bosé; Jeanne Moreau; Gérard Depardieu
- Cinematography: Ghislain Cloquet
- Edited by: Nicole Lubtchansky
- Release date: 6 October 1972
- Running time: 83 minutes
- Country: France
- Language: French

Nathalie Granger is a 1972 French drama film directed by Marguerite Duras.

== Plot ==
The film chronicles the monotony of a woman's day. She and her friend are shown working in the garden, talking about their families and receiving the occasional visitor. The storyline mostly moves along without much dialogue, except when a washing machine salesman comes to call.

== Cast ==
- Lucia Bosé - Isabelle
- Jeanne Moreau - Other Woman
- Gérard Depardieu - Salesman
- Luce Garcia-Ville - Teacher
- Valerie Mascolo - Nathalie Granger
- Nathalie Bourgeois - Laurence
- Dionys Mascolo - Granger
