= Giulio Questi =

Italian film director and screenwriter

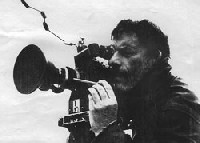
- Questi in 1967
- Born: 18 March 1924; Bergamo, Italy
- Died: 3 December 2014 (aged 90); Rome, Italy
- Occupations: Film director; screen writer
- Known for: Short stories, documentaries
- Spouse: Marilú Carteny (m. 1954; d. 2009)

Giulio Questi (18 March 1924 – 3 December 2014) was an Italian film director and screenwriter.

== Early life ==
Questi was born in Bergamo, the oldest son of an anti-fascist, engineer father and a mother who, despite only attending primary school, loved literature. His parents eventually had three girls and one son - the latter of which was 19 years younger than him, and died of lung cancer sometime in the 2000s. Two of Questi's sisters moved to South Africa and became citizens, living there for 50 years, while another remained in Bergamo throughout her life.

In 1929, Questi's father was laid off from his job due to the economic downturn of the Great Depression. After an undisclosed period of unemployment, he eventually found work in Milan.

== Military service (1943-1945) ==
From 1943 to 1945, he was a partisan in the Italian resistance movement. Regarding the experience, he said that he, "stepped into his adult life with war, nothing else." The two years he spent as a partisan deeply influenced his filmmaking style throughout his career.

== Post-war years (1945-1950s) ==
After the war, Questi's family, much like many in Italy, was penniless. His father worked on attempting to patent a series of inventions, such as various switches for motors and a car-parking system. Unfortunately, he passed away from cancer in 1954, at the age of 53.

Questi himself found returning to civilian life difficult, considering what he had experienced during the war. He enrolled in a university in Milan by selling his weapons from his time as a Partisan, which he claimed were revolvers and a German machine pistol, to a gangster - though he also received a scholarship from the Italian government due to his military service. In Milan, he studied humanities and graduated with a thesis on Dino Campana.

== Career ==
=== 1940s ===
Before entering the film industry, Questi returned to Bergamo and co-founded a literary and political journal titled La Cittadella, which featured many acclaimed contemporary poets.

=== 1950s ===
He wrote short stories and filmed several documentaries before he started as assistant director and script writer in the movie business.

=== 1960s ===
He is best known for the films La morte ha fatto l'uovo and Django Kill! (If You Live Shoot!).

== Later years ==
In the early 2000s, Questi purchased a digital camera, and with it, he made seven short films from 2002 to 2007. All of these short films were later released on a 2008 double DVD from Ripley's Home Video, titled By Giulio Questi.

== Death ==
Questi died in his sleep in Rome on December 3, 2014, at the age of 90.

== Filmography ==
Title	Year	Credited as				Notes	Ref(s)
Title	Year	Director	Screenwriter	Screen story writer	Other	Notes	Ref(s)
Le italiane e l'amour	1962	Yes	Yes				
Universo di notte	1963	Yes					
Nudi per vivere	1963	Yes	Yes				
Amori pericolosi	1964	Yes	Yes				
The Possessed	1965		Yes				
Django Kill... If You Live, Shoot!	1967	Yes	Yes	Yes			
Death Laid an Egg	1968	Yes	Yes	Yes			
Arcana	1972	Yes	Yes	Yes			
L'uomo della sabbia	1981	Yes	Yes			Television film	
La guerre des insectes	1981		Yes			Television film	
Vampirismus	1982	Yes	Yes			Television film	
Quando arriva il giudice	1986	Yes	Yes	Yes		Television mini-series	
Non aprire all'uomo nero	1990	Yes	Yes	Yes		Television film	
Il segno del comando	1992	Yes	Yes			Television mini-series	
L'ispettore Sarti - Un poliziotto, una cita	1994	Yes					
