= Blood and Bullets =

Blood And Bullets
- Directed by: Alfonso Brescia
- Written by: Aldo Crudo; Alfonso Brescia
- Starring: Jack Palance; George Eastman; Jenny Tamburi
- Cinematography: Silvio Fraschetti
- Edited by: Carlo Broglio
- Music by: Alessandro Alessandroni
- Production company: Hilda Film
- Distributed by: C.I.A.
- Release date: 11 December 1976 (Italy)
- Running time: 95 minutes
- Country: Italy
- Box office: ₤253.359 million

Blood and Bullets (Italian: Sangue di sbirro, also known as Knell, Bloody Avenger) is a 1976 Italian poliziottesco film written and directed by Alfonso Brescia and starring Jack Palance, George Eastman and Jenny Tamburi.

== Cast ==
- Jack Palance as Duke
- George Eastman as Dan Caputo aka Knell
- Jenny Tamburi as Susan
- Robert Giraudo as Captain Jeffrey
- Ugo Bologna as Mallory
- Jut Grams as Sharp
- Nicole Barthelmy as Belle
- Renato Montalbano as Looney Toledo
- Aldo Cecconi as Agent Owen
- Nello Pazzafini as Belle's Man
- Nick Jordan as Cop at Airport

== Release ==
Blood and Bullets premiered in Italy on December 11, 1976. It grossed a total of 253,359,230 Italian lire.

== See also ==
- List of Italian films of 1976
