= Sydne Rome =

American-Italian film actress

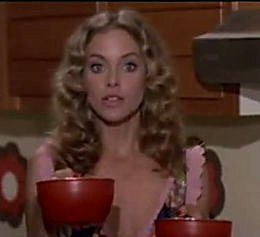
- Sydne Rome in The Gamecock (1974)
- Born: March 17, 1946 (age 80); Akron, Ohio, U.S
- Occupation: Actress
- Spouses: Emilio Lari (m. 1973, divorced) Roberto Bernabei (m. 1987)

Sydne Rome (born March 17, 1946. pronunciation SID-nee ROHM) is an American-Italian film actress, who has, with one notable exception, worked exclusively in Europe. Her first name is often misspelled Sydney or Sidne.

== Biography ==
Born in Akron, Rome grew up in a Jewish family in Upper Sandusky, Ohio. Her father was president of a plastics corporation in the Akron area. Her younger sister was August 1977 Playboy Playmate Julia Lyndon (Lisa Moira Sarah Rome, 1957-2019). After attending high school in Akron, Sydne went to Carnegie Tech in Pittsburgh to study acting. A subsequent apprenticeship with the Pasadena Playhouse in California broadened Rome's acting skills and she caught the eye of an agent, resulting in a transatlantic flight for what would ultimately prove an unsuccessful 1968 audition for the role of Candy's titular protagonist. After an additional year of Playhouse work, Rome made her film debut in the 1969 British spy comedy Some Girls Do. She then began appearing mostly in Italian films, with roles in Spaghetti Westerns and other genres; often playing the young, seemingly innocent American abroad. Subsequently, Rome appeared in German films and television. Since the late 1990s she has acted in Italian TV films and series.

At the beginning of the 1980s, Rome became an icon of the aerobics craze and produced workout videos as well as an album, Aerobic Fitness Dancing, produced by Frank Farian and recorded in German, Spanish and Italian. As a singer, she recorded the single "Angelo prepotente" (1980) in Italian, English ("For You") and German ("Wozu"). She also recorded a cover version of Marty Balin's hit "Hearts".

== Personal life ==
In 1973, Rome married Emilio Lari; subsequently, she converted to Catholicism, divorced, and married gerontologist Roberto Bernabei. She has been living in Rome since the early 1970s. Bernabei and Rome have two grown children.

In 2009, Rome's face was disfigured in an accident when her car's air bag exploded.

== Selected filmography ==
- Some Girls Do (Ralph Thomas, 1969)
- Sundance and the Kid (Duccio Tessari, 1969)
- So Long Gulliver (1970)
- Man Called Amen (Alfio Caltabiano, 1972)
- What? (Roman Polanski, 1972)
- Merry-Go-Round (Otto Schenk, 1973)
- Creezy (Pierre Granier-Deferre, 1974)
- The Gamecock (La Sculacciata, Pasquale Festa Campanile, 1974)
- Order to Kill (Josè Gutiérrez Maesso, 1975)
- That Lucky Touch (Christopher Miles, 1975)
- Il faut vivre dangereusement (Claude Makovski, 1975)
- Wanted: Babysitter (René Clément, 1975)
- Hugs and Other Things (Jochen Richter, 1975)
- The Twist (Claude Chabrol, 1976)
- Sex with a Smile (Sergio Martino, 1976)
- Il mostro (Luigi Zampa, 1977)
- Moi, fleur bleue (Éric Le Hung, 1977)
- Formula 1 La febbre della velocità (Speed Fever, Mario Morra 1978)
- Just a Gigolo (Schöner Gigolo, armer Gigolo, David Hemmings, 1979)
- The Pumaman (L'Uomo puma, Alberto De Martino, 1980)
- Looping (Walter Bockmayer/ Rolf Buehrmann, 1981)
- Red Bells (Sergei Bondarchuk, 1982)
- Red Bells II (Sergei Bondarchuk, 1983)
- Romanza final (Gayarre) (José María Forqué, 1986)
- In the Heat of the Night (ep. Who Was Geli Bendl?, 1994)
- Padre Pio: Between Heaven and Earth (TV, 2000)
- Lourdes (TV, 2000)
- Saint Rita (TV, Giorgio Capitani, 2004)
- Callas e Onassis (TV, Giorgio Capitani, 2005)
- The Hideout (2007)
- Il figlio più piccolo (The Youngest Son, Pupi Avati, 2010)
- Il cuore grande delle ragazze (Pupi Avati, 2011)
- The Palace (Roman Polanski, 2023)
