= Piero Livi =

Italian film director and screenwriter

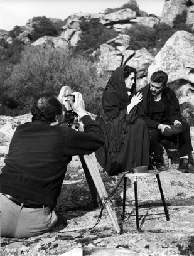
- Piero Livi (from behind) directs a scene of Una storia sarda (1962)
- Born: 1 April 1925; Olbia, Italy
- Died: 2 September 2015 (aged 90); Rome, Italy
- Occupations: Film director, screenwriter

Piero Livi (1 April 1925 – 2 September 2015) was an Italian director and screenwriter.

== Career ==
Born in Olbia, Livi was among the founders of a film society in his hometown, and was organizer and artistic director of eighteen editions of the International Festival of Olbia, from 1957 to 1974. He started his career in 1957, with the short film Marco dal mare. He made his feature film debut in 1969, with the neorealistic drama Pelle di bandito, loosely based on real life events of the Sardinian bandit Graziano Mesina, which was screened out of competition at the 31st Venice International Film Festival. He was also a director of dubbing.

== Filmography ==
- Marco del mare (short film, 1957)
- Visitazione (short film, 1958)
- Il faro (short film, 1961)
- Una storia sarda (medium length film, 1962)
- I 60 di Berchiddeddu (short film, 1965), co-directed with Aldo Serio
- Il cerchio del silenzio (short film, 1966), co-directed with Aldo Serio
- Pelle di bandito (1969)
- Dove volano i corvi d'argento (1976)
- Sos laribiancos - I dimenticati (2001)
- Maria sì (2005)
