= No Peace Under the Olive Tree =

- Directed by: Giuseppe De Santis
- Written by: Giuseppe De Santis; Gianni Puccini
- Produced by: Domenico Forges Davanzati
- Starring: Raf Vallone; Lucia Bosé; Folco Lulli
- Cinematography: Piero Portalupi
- Edited by: Gabriele Varriale
- Music by: Goffredo Petrassi
- Production company: Lux Film
- Distributed by: Lux Film
- Release date: 10 September 1950
- Running time: 107 minutes
- Country: Italy
- Language: Italian

No Peace Under the Olive Tree (Italian: Non c'è pace tra gli ulivi) is a 1950 Italian neorealist drama film directed by Giuseppe De Santis and starring Raf Vallone, Lucia Bosé and Folco Lulli. It was the director's follow-up to Bitter Rice (1949) which also starred Vallone. It was originally planned to partner him with Silvana Mangano again, but due to her pregnancy she was replaced by Lucia Bosé. Despite the commercial success of Bitter Rice, the Communist De Santis had been stung by left-wing criticism due to American cultural elements included the film which he purposefully excluded from the follow-up. He also included characters who were less ambiguous and concluded with a happy ending, similar to those of Socialist realism.

The film's sets were designed by the art director Carlo Egidi. Location shooting took place around Fondi in Lazio, the hometown of director De Santis.

== Synopsis ==
A young shepherd returns home after the Second World War having been held in a prisoner of war camp. He finds that the local landowner has stolen his sheep and his girlfriend. When he also assaults and murders his sister, the shepherd takes revenge.

== Cast ==
- Raf Vallone as Francesco Dominici
- Lucia Bosé as Lucia
- Folco Lulli as Agostino Bonfiglio
- Maria Grazia Francia as Maria Grazia
- Dante Maggio as Salvatore
- Michele Riccardini as the Maresciallo
- Vincenzo Talarico as the lawyer
- Pietro Tordi as Don Gaetano

== Bibliography ==
- Gundle, Stephen. Fame Amid the Ruins: Italian Film Stardom in the Age of Neorealism. Berghahn Books, 2019.
