= The Three Musketeers of the West =

1973 comedy film

- Directed by: Bruno Corbucci
- Written by: Leonardo Martín; Bruno Corbucci; Tito Carpi; Peter Berling
- Starring: Timothy Brent; George Eastman
- Cinematography: Rafael Pacheco
- Music by: Carlo Rustichelli
- Release date: 28 September 1973
- Running time: 87 minutes
- Countries: Italy; Spain; West Germany
- Language: Italian

Tutti per uno... botte per tutti, internationally released as The Three Musketeers of the West, is a 1973 Italian spaghetti Western-comedy film directed by Bruno Corbucci.

It is a western-comedy version of Alexandre Dumas' novel The Three Musketeers. It has been described as "one of the craziest Spaghetti Westerns ever made" and "an over the top comedy vehicle from start to finish".

== Cast ==
- Timothy Brent as Dart Coldwater Jr.
- George Eastman as Mc Athos
- Chris Huerta as Portland
- Leo Anchóriz as Aramirez
- Karin Schubert as Alice
- Eduardo Fajardo as The Banker
- Max Turilli as Baron Von Horn
- Vittorio Congia as Cheese Valley village chief
- Pietro Tordi as Dart's father
- José Canalejas as Mendoza
- Eleonora Giorgi as Dart's girlfriend
- Hsueh Han as Cin Ciao

== See also ==
- List of Italian films of 1973
