= Nick Carter and Red Club =

Nick Carter et le trèfle rouge
- Directed by: Jean-Paul Savignac
- Written by: Claude Rank (novel); Jean-Paul Savignac; Paul Vecchiali
- Produced by: André Michelin
- Starring: Eddie Constantine
- Cinematography: Claude Beausoleil
- Edited by: Lila Biro
- Music by: Alain Goraguer
- Release date: 1965
- Countries: France, Italy
- Language: French

Nick Carter and Red Club (French: Nick Carter et le trèfle rouge) is a 1965 French action film directed by Jean-Paul Savignac. The film features the successful literary character Nick Carter and is based on a novel by Claude Rank. The film is a sequel to Nick Carter va tout casser (1964).

== Cast ==
- Eddie Constantine ... Nick Carter
- Nicole Courcel ... Dora
- Joe Dassin ... Janos
- Jeanne Valérie ... Lia
- Graziella Galvani... Nanny
- Marcello Pagliero ... Witt
- Jacques Harden ... Herbert
- Roger Rudel ... Beckman
