= Kung Fu Brothers in the Wild West =

1973 Italian-Hong Kong film by Ban-Yee Yeo

- Poster
- Directed by: Ban-Yee Yeo
- Written by: Ni Kuang
- Starring: William Berger; Donal O'Brien; Jason Pai Piao; Winnie Pei Nei
- Release date: 1973
- Countries: Italy; Hong Kong

Kung Fu Brothers in the Wild West (original title in Cantonese: 龍虎征西), also known as Man from Golden City, is a 1973 Kung fu Spaghetti Western film directed by Ban-Yee Yeo and written by Ni Kuang. Co-produced by Italy and Hong Kong, the film stars William Berger, Donal O'Brien, Jason Pai Piao, and Winnie Pei Nei. It revolves around a Chinese kung fu master who confronts a gang of ruffians in the American Wild West.

== Plot ==
Chen and Dough, two Chinese brothers, who are Kung fu fighters, compete to decide who will be the master of their school. Dough runs away to America. After a few years, Chen finds him in a small town in the West, where both fight against a gang of ruffians.

== Cast ==
- William Berger as Steve
- Donal O'Brien as Don
- Jason Pai Piao as Chen
- Winnie Pei Nei as Ling
- Thompson Kao as King Dragon
- Rosemarie Lindt as Elaine
- Tang Chin Ho as Dough

== Production ==
The film was filmed in Italy. The soundtrack was composed by Franco Bracardi.

== Release ==
The film was distributed internationally in France, Italy, West Germany and the United Kingdom, among others.

== Reception ==
A retrospective very mixed review states that "It might be the only Spaghetti Western in which coins are turned into weapons''.
