= Death Smiles on a Murderer =

1973 film

- Italian film poster
- Directed by: Joe D'Amato
- Screenplay by: Joe D'Amato; Romano Scandariato; Claudio Bernabei
- Story by: Joe D'Amato
- Produced by: Franco Gaudenzi
- Starring: Ewa Aulin; Klaus Kinski; Angela Bo; Sergio Doria
- Cinematography: Joe D'Amato
- Edited by: Piera Bruni; Gianfranco Simoncelli
- Music by: Berto Pisano
- Production company: Dany Film
- Distributed by: Variety Distribution
- Release date: 11 July 1973 (Italy)
- Running time: 92 minutes
- Country: Italy
- Language: Italian
- Budget: 150 million lire
- Box office: 70.990 million lire (Italy)

Death Smiles on a Murderer (Italian: La morte ha sorriso all'assassino; English title sequence: Death Smiles at Murder) is a 1973 Italian horror film directed by Joe D'Amato and starring Ewa Aulin, Klaus Kinski and Luciano Rossi.

== Plot ==
1906. In a crypt-like room, hunchbacked Franz von Holstein mourns over the body of Greta, his young sister and only love. A first flashback shows him sexually assaulting her, after which she expresses her wish to leave this cursed place with him, to live and to be among people. In a second flashback, she teases him into chasing her when she stumbles upon Doctor Herbert von Ravensbrück; they get romantically involved while Franz watches from hiding.

1909. Walter von Ravensbrück (Herbert's son) and his wife Eva are being served tea by butler Simeon when a carriage driving by at high speed is overturned and the coachman fatally impaled. Inside the coach is Greta, unconscious. Inspector Dannick wants to question her, but Walter convinces him otherwise. Instead, Doctor Sturges is called to check on her. He hears no heartbeat and discovers her gold medallion carrying the inscription "Greta 1906" as well as mysterious symbols, which he recognizes, perturbed.

Getrud, the Ravensbrücks' servant, having recognized Greta, is haunted in her room by Franz von Holstein, who repeatedly vanishes and reappears and cuts her neck open with a scalpel - a wound that bleeds but disappears.

Sturges discovers a scar on Greta's neck on the same spot. He inserts a needle into her right eyeball, causing neither damage nor pain and confirming that Greta is undead. For the coachman's death certificate, he opens the coffin to discover the corpse's rapid decomposition - an indication that he was undead at the time of the crash. Sturges keeps both facts secret.

Gertrud packs her things, leaves, and is chased by Franz's apparition along a path at whose end she is approached by an unseen assailant, who - despite her assertion that she has not told anyone and is leaving for good - murders her.

Meanwhile, Doctor Sturges is working in his underground laboratory. The medallion's symbols contain a formula for the creation of life. Just as Sturges succeeds in bringing one of his corpses to life, he is strangled by an unseen assailant, who also kills the corpse and the doctor's deaf lab assistant.

Walter and Eva both gradually fall in love with Greta. Spying on a love meeting between Walter and Greta, Eva's jealousy escalates. In Walter's absence, she lures Greta into the villa's cellar, where she declares her hate and walls her up alive. She lies to Walter about Gret's unexpected departure. Dannick investigates Greta's disappearance, remaining clueless.

A month later, a masquerade ball is held at the villa. In a party game, Eva has to guess the identities of the masked guests. A woman in red whose name she cannot guess puts aside her creepily deformed mask, revealing herself as Greta and vanishing. In disbelief, Eva checks for the body when the dark cat jumps through the wall opening at her face and runs up the stairs, where Greta appears, smiling. Eva follows her and Greta's face suddenly turns into a rotten corpse. She chases Eva up into the attic, from where Eva falls to her death, screaming.

Herbert, Walter's father, returns for Eva's funeral. During the ceremony, he catches a glimpse of Greta standing in the distance, which causes him to have a flashback to 1906: Greta dies in childbirth and Franz points his finger at him in accusation.

After Eva's funeral, Herbert stays behind to visit Greta's grave. Greta comes up from behind and reminds him of their baby's prenatal death. When she asks for a kiss, her face again suddenly turns rotten. Herbert, terrified, attempts to escape. He seeks refuge inside a crypt. When the door suddenly shuts tight, Eva's freshly laid corpse slowly gets up and walks towards him.

Walter lies in his bed, falling asleep. The dark cat enters his room, and Walter suddenly notices Greta sitting near his bedside. As she crawls into bed and starts kissing him, her face turns rotten.

In the family granary, Greta lures Simeon out of his hiding place, acknowledging that he did not betray her identity and promising him anything he could wish for: money, or better even, love. She then kills him. As the police are covering up Simeon's body, Walter's body is discovered clutching Greta's medallion.

Inspector Dannick visits Professor Kempte about the medallion's symbols, who explains that the Incans believed they contained a formula which could bring their king back to life. Franz von Holstein, a brilliant former student of his, had worked on deciphering it, but had given up after his sister's death. Kempte gives Dannick Franz's address.

In a final flashback to 1906 and to the room in which the film started, now brightly lit, Franz walks up to Greta, who is dressed in white and holding a bouquet of white flowers. He tells her triumphantly that he brought her back to life and that she is his now, puts the medallion inscribed with the year of her "new creation" around her neck and promises her they will leave and start a new life together. As "proof of love", Greta throws the white flowers at his face. They turn into the dark cat in mid-air, which kills him. Greta, whose dress has magically turned red, giggles and leaves with a smile. Dannick, now entering this room in 1909, discovers Franz's corpse.

At the cemetery, Dannick looks at Greta's photograph on her empty grave, wondering whether he will ever solve the mystery about this woman who he has never even seen. When he returns home, the figure he previously addressed as his wife and which hitherto has been sitting with her back to the viewer turns around. It is an aged Greta smiling at Dannick, who reacts to seeing her, perhaps recognizing her face as Greta's.

== Cast ==
- Ewa Aulin as Greta Von Holstein
- Klaus Kinski as Dr. Sturges
- Angela Bo as Eva Von Ravensbrück
- Sergio Doria as Walter Von Ravensbrück
- Attilio Dottesio as Inspector Dannick
- Marco Mariani as Simeon, the butler
- Luciano Rossi as Franz Von Holstein, Greta's Brother
- Giacomo Rossi-Stuart as Dr. Herbert Von Ravensbrück, Walter's Father
- Fernando Cerulli as Professor Kempte (credited as Franco Cerulli)

Credited, but not in the picture:

- Carla Mancini

Uncredited:

- Evelyn Melcherich as Gertrud, the Maid
- Pietro Torrisi as Dr. Sturges' Assistant
- Tony Askin as Reanimated Corpse
- Giorgio Dolfin as Maier
- Oscar Sciamanna as Party Guest

== Production ==
Death Smiles on a Murderer was produced by Franco Gaudenzi, whom D'Amato had met through production manager Oscar Santaniello. Their first collaboration led to D'Amato directing Un Bounty Killer a Trinità, one of the several films directed by D'Amato with someone else taking credit. This was the first film D'Amato directed himself in which he used his real name in the credits: Aristide Massaccesi. He said in an interview, he signed his own name to the film because "I felt encouraged by the budget....and by the presence of two important actors like Ewa Aulin and Klaus Kinski, who were appearing at the time in several Italian films.....Kinski, in spite of everything, is an excellent professional actor."

The film credits the script to D'Amato, Romano Scandariato and Claudio Bernabei; the latter was said to just be a typist by Scandariato. The story is credited to D'Amato, which Scandariato said was "more or less one page." Scandariato stated the film was originally written with more suspense and as more of a giallo, but this was changed out of necessity. D'Amato later claimed he wrote the screenplay entirely on his own, saying in an interview "I'm afraid it's a very imperfect film.....but this is due to the fact that I wrote the script on my own. When you don't work with someone else....it's much harder to come up with a good product.....and I really was inexperienced as far as screenwriting goes" The script takes several elements from works of Gothic fiction. Joseph Sheridan Le Fanu's novella Carmilla similarly contains a carriage accident that introduces the female character to the household, and there is also a cat connection in that, similarly to Carmilla in Laura's nightmares, Greta either shapeshifts into or controls a cat. In Edgar Allan Poe's short story The Black Cat, a woman is walled in alive and a cat is found inside upon reopening, just like Greta is walled in by Eva and a cat emerges when Eva tears down the wall to check. In another one of Edgar Allan Poe's short stories, The Masque of the Red Death, the Red Death enters Prospero's masquerade ball in a blood-spattered robe and a mask resembling that of the corpses that died from the plague, Greta enters the masked ball of the von Ravensbrücks clad in red and wearing a corpse-like mask.

The film was given a low budget of 150 million Italian lire. Death Smiles on a Murderer was shot between November and December 1972 with a working title of 7 strani cadaveri (lit. 'Seven Strange Corpses'). Some scenes were not in the script and were improvised on set. These include a scene in which Luciano Rossi is attacked by a cat, which D'Amato achieved by throwing the cat against Rossi's face.

== Release ==
Death Smiles on a Murderer was released in Italy on 11 July 1973. Film historian Roberto Curti referred to this box office as "scarce business" noting its unimportant distributor Florida Cinematografica. In Italy, the film grossed a total of 70,990,000 Italian lire. It was released in the United States as Death Smiles on a Murderer and Death Smiles at Murder.

A Blu-ray of the film was released on 21 May 2018 by Arrow Video in a "2k restoration from the original camera negative", containing English and Italian audio, a commentary track by film historian Tim Lucas and the original English and Italian trailers.

== Reception ==
In Matthew Edwards' book on Klaus Kinski published in 2016, the film, called "trippy, but fascinating", is compared to Jess Franco's Venus in Furs in that its "existential, haunting and dreamlike qualities do nothing to detract from the enjoyment of what takes place on screen".
