= Lucia Bosè =

Italian actress (1931–2020)

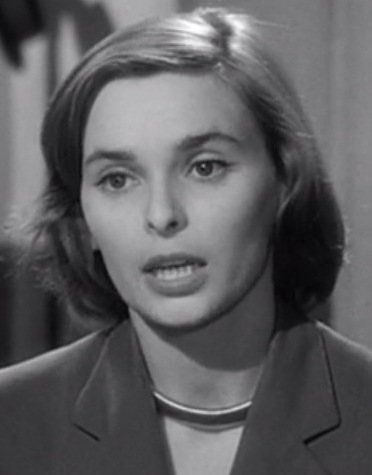
- Bosè in It Happened at the Police Station (1954)
- Born: Lucia Bosè; 28 January 1931; Milan, Lombardy, Kingdom of Italy
- Died: 23 March 2020 (aged 89); Segovia, Castile and León, Spain
- Occupation: Actress
- Years active: 1950–2007
- Spouse: Luis Miguel Dominguín (m. 1955; div. 1967)
- Children: 3, including Miguel Bosé
- Relatives: Bimba Bosé (granddaughter); Dora Postigo (great-granddaughter)

Lucia Bosè (28 January 1931 – 23 March 2020) was an Italian actress.

== Life and career ==
Lucia Bosè was born in Milan to Francesca Borloni and Domenico Bosè. After a number of years working in a bakery, Pasticceria Galli, in her native city, in 1947 she won the second edition of the Miss Italia beauty contest.

She earned a role in Dino Risi's short film, 1848 (1948), before making her feature film debut in the 1950 film, Non c'è pace tra gli ulivi (No Peace Under the Olive Tree) directed by Giuseppe De Santis, who later directed her again in 1952's Roma, ore 11 (Rome 11:00). That same year, she starred in Antonioni's Cronaca di un amore (Story of a Love Affair) and in 1953, she reunited with him for La signora senza camelie (The Lady Without Camelias). In 1955, she appeared in the films Gli Sbandati (Abandoned) and Muerte de un ciclista (Death of a Cyclist). The following year, she played the main female role in Cela s'appelle l'aurore (This is Called Dawn).

Her career flourished until 1955, when she fell in love with Spanish bullfighter Luis Miguel Dominguín during the filming of Muerte de un ciclista, and gave up acting to marry and raise a family. The couple married twice, first on 1 March 1955 in Las Vegas and then on 19 October of that year, in a Catholic ceremony at the family estate or finca.

Dominguín returned to the bullfighting arena abroad, and their first child, Miguel Bosé, was born in Panama on 3 April 1956. Their second child, Lucia, was born in 1957 and their third, Paola, was born in 1960. Lucia and her husband were married until 1968, but their differences were accentuated over time, especially her lack of interest in bullfighting. She never became close to the "Dominguín" clan, and his marital infidelities also took their toll.

In 1960, she took a small uncredited role in Le Testament d'Orphée (Testament of Orpheus). Then, after divorcing Dominguín, she returned full-time to the screen, appearing in such films as Fellini Satyricon (1969), Under the Sign of Scorpio (1969), Something Creeping in The Dark (1971), L'ospite (1972), Arcana (1972), Nathalie Granger (1972), La messe dorée (1975), Lumière (1976), and Violanta (1976). She continued to be active in both Italian cinema and Spanish films, appearing in Cronaca di una morte annunciata (Chronicle of a Death Foretold, 1987), El niño de la luna (Moon Child, 1989), Harem Suare (1999), and I Viceré (2007).

== Death ==
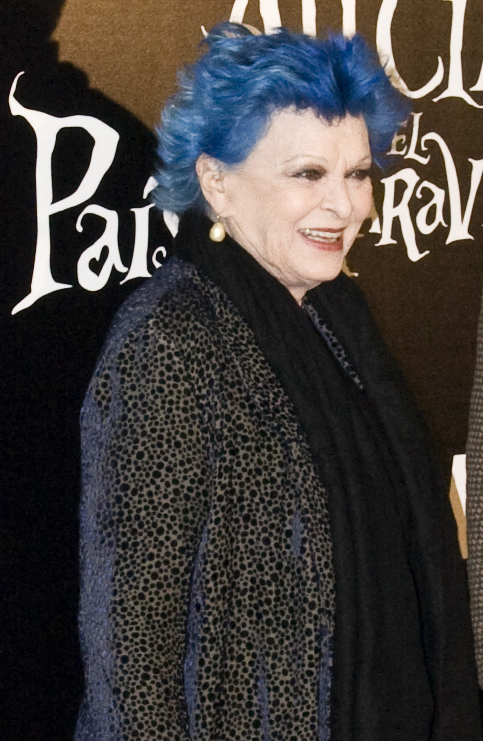
Bosè in 2010

Bosè died at the General Hospital of Segovia on 23 March 2020, at the age of 89, from pneumonia during the COVID-19 pandemic.

== Partial filmography ==
- No Peace Under the Olive Tree (1950) – Lucia Silvestri
- Story of a Love Affair (1950) – Paola Molon Fontana
- It's Love That's Ruining Me (1951) – Clara Montesi
- Paris Is Always Paris (1951) – Mimi de Angelis
- Three Girls from Rome (1952) – Marisa Benvenuti
- Rome 11:00 (1952) – Simona
- The Temptress (1952)
- The Lady Without Camelias (1953) – Clara Manni
- It Was She Who Wanted It! (1953) – Nausicaa Invernaghi
- Of Life and Love (1954) – Angela Reis (segment "Marsina stretta")
- Concert of Intrigue (1954) – Elisabeth Tatabor
- It Happened at the Police Station (1954) – Stefania Rocca, wife of Luigi
- Magic Village (1955) – Thérèse Miceli
- Death of a Cyclist (1955) – María José de Castro
- Abandoned (1955) – Lucia
- Symphony of Love (1956) – Teresa Grob
- Cela s'appelle l'aurore (1956) – Clara
- Testament of Orpheus (1960) – Une amie d'Orphée / Orphée's Friend (uncredited)
- No somos de piedra (1968) – Monja
- Nocturne 29 (1968)
- Under the Sign of Scorpio (1969) – Glaia
- Fellini Satyricon (1969) – La matrona
- Love and Other Solitudes (1969) – María
- The Picasso Summer (1969) – Woman (uncredited)
- Jutrzenka (1969) – George Sand
- Metello (1970) – Viola
- So Long Gulliver (1970) – Evelyne
- Something Creeping in The Dark (1971) – Sylvia Forrest
- The Double (1971) – Nora Tosatti
- L'ospite (1971) – Anna / Mélisande / Geneviève
- The House of the Doves (1972) – Alexandra / Mother
- Arcana (1972) – Mamma
- Nathalie Granger (1972) – Isabelle
- La colonna infame (1972) – Chiara Mora – la moglie di Giacomo
- The Heroes (1973) – (uncredited)
- Ceremonia sangrienta (1973) – Erzebeth Bathory
- Manchas de sangre en un coche nuevo (1975) – Eva
- La messe dorée (1975) – Hélène
- Down the Ancient Stairs (1975) – Francesca
- Lumière (1976) – Laura
- Los viajes escolares (1976) – Avelina
- Violanta (1977) – Donna Violanta
- Chronicle of a Death Foretold (1987) – Placida Linero
- Brumal (1988) – Madre de Adriana
- Moon Child (1989) – Directora
- Volevo i pantaloni (1990) – Grazia
- The Miser (1990) – Dona Elvira
- Harem Suare (1999) – Old Safiye
- I Viceré (2007) – Donna Ferdinanda
- One More Time (2013) – Lucia (final film role)

Awards and achievements
Preceded by Rossana Martini	Miss Italia; 1947	Succeeded by Fulvia Franco
