= Emilio Lari =

Italian born movie stills photographer

Emilio Lari is an Italian-born movie stills photographer.

== Career ==
Emilio started his career by bluffing his way on to the set of Richard Lester's A Hard Day's Night in 1964. On set, the crew and actors happened to be waiting for a photographer from L’European magazine and welcomed Lari accordingly. Emilio happily played the role until he was exposed when the official photographer arrived. However, his ability and friendly approach led to an invitation to the filming of Help! in 1965.

Lari would go on to develop a career spanning 40 years of European and Hollywood movies – such as the 1966 film Barbarella, Franco Zeffirelli's 1968 film Romeo and Juliet, and Sergio Leone's Once Upon A Time in America.

Lari's portfolio includes stills of iconic figures caught off guard; such as John Lennon in a long dark wig, and Jane Fonda using a director's chair to put her feet up between takes.

Emilio Lari's personality characterises much of his photography. Francis Ford Coppola said of him, "you...can't separate the work from the man, but both lifted your spirits."

Lari also did personal photoshoots for celebrities, including David Bowie, Jodie Foster, Robert De Niro, Michelle Pfeiffer and others.

=== Selected Films ===
- Help!, Director: Richard Lester, 1965
- Candy, Director: Christian Marquand, 1968
- Barbarella, Director: Roger Vadim, 1968
- Romeo and Juliet, Director: Franco Zeffirelli, 1968
- Kelly's Heroes, Director: Brian G. Hutton, 1969
- The Beloved, Director: George P. Cosmatos, 1971
- The Godfather, Director: Francis Ford Coppola, 1972
- The Godfather Part II, Director: Francis Ford Coppola, 1974
- Just a Gigolo, Director: David Hemmings, 1978
- Raging Bull, Director: Martin Scorsese, 1980
- Once Upon A Time in America, Director: Sergio Leone, 1984
- Ladyhawke, Director: Richard Donner, 1985
- The Godfather Part III, Director: Francis Ford Coppola, 1990
