= Seduction (1973 film) =

- Directed by: Fernando Di Leo
- Screenplay by: Luisa Montagnana; Ercole Patti; Marino Onorati; Fernando Di Leo
- Based on: La seduzione by Ercole Patti
- Starring: Lisa Gastoni; Maurice Ronet
- Cinematography: Franco Villa
- Edited by: Amedeo Giomini
- Music by: Luis Enriquez Bacalov
- Production company: Cineproduzioni Daunia 70
- Distributed by: Alpherat
- Release date: October 30, 1973 (Italy)
- Running time: 95 minutes
- Country: Italy
- Box office: 1,568,418,000 Italian lire

Seduction (Italian: La seduzione) is a 1973 Italian erotic film. It was directed by Fernando Di Leo and based on the novel La seduzione by Ercole Patti.

== Plot ==
After many years working as a journalist in France, Giuseppe returns to the empty family home in his native Acireale and looks up his old flame Caterina, now a widow and mother of the teenage Graziella. A staid middle-aged romance is rekindled and he begins spending nights in her home. Graziella, though she has a local boyfriend, finds her mother's mature and sophisticated lover far more alluring and starts trying to entice him.

Giuseppe succumbs to Graziella's charms bit by bit, and the affair has only just been consummated when Caterina finds out. Stormy arguments among the three end with a fragile truce, in which Giuseppe will not abandon Caterina. Unhappy that she has not won, Graziella gets her friend Rosina to tempt Giuseppe into a beach cabin and then rushes to tell her mother about this new infidelity. Dressing herself immaculately, Caterina waits outside Giuseppe's house until he emerges, when she shoots him dead.

== Cast ==
- Lisa Gastoni as Caterina
- Maurice Ronet as Giuseppe
- Jenny Tamburi as Graziella
- Pino Caruso as Alfredo
- Graziella Galvani as Luisa
- Barbara Marzano as Rosina
- Rosario Bonaventura as Rosario

== Casting ==
Originally the character of Graziella was planned to be played by Ornella Muti, but she was eventually dropped because considered too attractive for the role.

== Release and reception ==
Seduction was distributed in Italy by Alpherat on October 30, 1973. It grossed a total of 1,586,418,000 Italian lire. It was released in the United Kingdom as Seduction on March 28, 1974 with a 92 minute running time.

At the time of its release, the newspapers widely reported the news of a man who died of a heart attack watching the movie.
