= Man Called Invincible =

1973 film

- Directed by: Giuliano Carnimeo
- Produced by: Luciano Martino
- Cinematography: Stelvio Massi
- Music by: Bruno Nicolai
- Release date: 3 May 1973
- Country: Italy
- Language: Italian

Man Called Invincible (Italian: Lo chiamavano Tresette... giocava sempre col morto, also known as They Called Him the Player with the Dead, In the West There Was a Man Named Invincible and Tricky Dicky) is a 1973 Italian Spaghetti Western-comedy film directed by Giuliano Carnimeo.

== Cast ==
- George Hilton: Tresette
- Chris Huerta: Bamby
- Evelyn Stewart: Miss Marlene
- Umberto D'Orsi: McPearson
- Tony Norton: Veleno
- Nello Pazzafini: Aureola Joe
- Rosalba Neri: Concettina
- Sal Borgese: Salvatore

== Reception ==
The film received mixed reviews. Christian Kessler praised the decor and the cinematography of the film, so that "this crackling-shards-comedy looks relatively good". Achille Valdata was ambivalent: "The name of the village, Melabacata (i.e. Septic Apple), gives an idea of the humorous intentions of this film" for which gags are "often amusing, in other cases end in themselves." The website Lexikon des Internationalen Films marked the film as "stupid".
