= Cris Huerta =

Portuguese actor

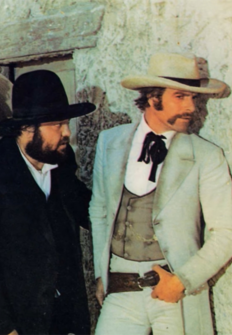
- Huerta (left) with Gianni Garko (right) in His Name Was Holy Ghost (1972)
- Born: Crisanto Huerta Brieva; 26 January 1935; Lisbon, Portugal
- Died: 28 November 2004 (aged 69); Madrid, Spain
- Occupation: Actor
- Years active: 1961–1998

Crisanto Huerta Brieva (26 January 1935 – 28 November 2004), better known as Cris Huerta, was a Portuguese-Spanish actor. He was known mainly for his roles in spaghetti western films of the 1960s and 1970s. He was sometimes credited as Chris Huerta.

== Life and career ==
Born in Lisbon, Huerta grew up in Madrid and he studied economics before giving up studies in favor of an acting career. He was one of the busiest character actors of the 1960s and 1970s and worked his way up from uncredited bit parts to leading roles even if usually in low budget films. The portly, bearded and bald actor appeared in more than 100 films, mainly Westerns, splitting his time between leading roles as the sympathetic sidekick of the hero and character roles such as Mexican bandits, bartenders and sleazy businessmen. Declined the spaghetti western genre, after 1977 he significantly slowed his activities. One of his last roles was in Marc Caro and Jean-Pierre Jeunet's The City of Lost Children (1995).

== Selected filmography ==
- Ursus (1961) - Challenging Wrestler
- King of Kings (1961) - Jewish Rebel (uncredited)
- A Nearly Decent Girl (1963) - Kronlick
- The Secret Seven (1963) - Gular
- The Secret of the Black Widow (1963) - Slim (uncredited)
- Los muertos no perdonan (1963) - Doctor
- Texas Ranger (1964) - Buck
- Massacre at Fort Grant (1964) - Arthur
- Seven Hours of Gunfire (1965) - Steve
- The Last Tomahawk (1965) - Fat Soldier (uncredited)
- The Relentless Four (1966) - Comisario
- Cotolay (1965)
- Seven Guns for the MacGregors (1966) - Crawford
- Django (1966) - Mexican Officer (uncredited)
- The Diabolical Dr. Z (1966) - Dr. Kallman
- Navajo Joe (1966) - El Gordo
- Residencia para espías (1966) - Willy
- Fantasia 3 (1966) - Otton (segment "Los tres pelos del diablo")
- Red Roses for Angelica (1966) - Paul
- The Desperate Ones (1967)
- Two Crosses at Danger Pass (1967) - Loud Drunk
- Bandidos (1967) - Vigonza
- More Than a Miracle (1967)
- Amor en el aire (1967)
- No somos de piedra (1968) - Miguel Dicazo
- Los que tocan el piano (1968) - Profesor Sorenson
- One by One (1968) - Lonely Drunkard in Saloon
- A Sky Full of Stars for a Roof (1968) - Fat man in stagecoach
- La dinamita está servida (1968) - Tino
- Long-Play (1968) - Sacerdote
- White Comanche (1968) - Blacksmith (uncredited)
- Cemetery Without Crosses (1969) - Hotel Desk Clerk (uncredited)
- Sundance and the Kid (1969) - James 'Bad Jim' Williams
- Urtain, el rey de la selva... o así (1969)
- Il corsaro (1970)
- Sartana Kills Them All (1970) - Deputy Smithy
- Sabata the Killer (1970) - Fuller
- The Magnificent Robin Hood (1970) - Little John
- Cannon for Cordoba (1970) - Cordoba officer (uncredited)
- La Lola, dicen que no vive sola (1970) - Don Federico
- The Wind's Fierce (1970) - Murdered Priest (uncredited)
- The Tigers of Mompracem (1970) - Giro Batol
- Reverend's Colt (1970) - Pat MacMurray
- Nights and Loves of Don Juan (1971)
- Black Beauty (1971) - The Commissioner [Spanish prints] (uncredited)
- The Feast of Satan (1971) - Hotel Guest
- A Town Called Hell (1971) - Gonzales (uncredited)
- Una chica casi decente (1971) - Director italiano
- Captain Apache (1971)
- Vamos a matar Sartana (1971)
- Kill (1971) - Nico Bizanthios
- The Legend of Frenchie King (1971)
- Un colt por cuatro cirios (1971) - Oswald
- Simón, contamos contigo (1971) - Director del western
- Ben and Charlie (1972) - San Diego Bank Manager (uncredited)
- His Name Was Holy Ghost (1972) - Carezza
- La liga no es cosa de hombres (1972) - Hans
- Escalofrío diabólico (1972) - Dr. Badman
- My Horse, My Gun, Your Widow (1972) - Grasco
- Ninguno de los tres se llamaba Trinidad (1972) - Bud Wesley
- Fat Brothers of Trinity (1973) - Bud
- Holy God, Here Comes the Passatore! (1973) - 'Domandone'
- My Colt, Not Yours (1973) - Town boss Jefferson
- Man Called Invincible (1973) - Banker McPherson
- ...e così divennero i 3 supermen del West (1973) - Jake Patch
- The Three Musketeers of the West (1973) - Portland
- Storia di karatè, pugni e fagioli (1973) - Buddy Piccolo
- Cebo para una adolescente (1974) - Onaindía
- El padrino y sus ahijadas (1974) - Salvatore
- Di Tresette ce n'è uno, tutti gli altri son nessuno (1974) - Paco
- Es knallt - und die Engel singen (1974) - Bud / Butch
- Con la música a otra parte (1974) - Pepito
- Chicas de alquiler (1974) - Señor
- Doctor, me gustan las mujeres, ¿es grave? (1974) - Guardia
- Dick Turpin (1974) - Conde de Belfort
- El último proceso en París (1974) - Dr. Laporte
- The White, the Yellow, and the Black (1975) - Robinson Watson 'Grasso'
- Valley of the Dancing Widows (1975) - Robert Breidlinger
- Tarzán y el tesoro Kawana (1975) - Christopher Malcolm
- Bienvenido, Mister Krif (1975)
- Los hijos de Scaramouche (1975) - Modisto
- El poder del deseo (1975) - Inspector gordo
- School of Death (1975)
- Imposible para una solterona (1976) - Juan
- Storia di arcieri, pugni e occhi neri (1976) - Friar Tuck
- Las delicias de los verdes años (1976) - Herculano
- Virilidad a la española (1977) - Marido secuestrador
- Impossible Love (1977) - Comandante
- Doña Perfecta (1977)
- 7 días de enero (1979) - Rubén (uncredited)
- Rocky Carambola (1979) - Jerry
- Die Brut des Bösen (1979) - Sumo
- Mieux vaut être riche et bien portant que fauché et mal foutu (1980)
- La guerra de los niños (1980) - Padre de Carlitos
- La patria del rata (1981) - Hombre Gordo Del Coche (uncredited)
- Una espía enamorada (1984)
- A Man Called Rage (1984) - Omar
- The Rogues (1987) - Il fabbro
- El aullido del diablo (1987) - Zacarías
- ¡No, hija, no! (1987) - Curro (uncredited)
- Dawn Breaks, Which Is No Small Thing (1989) - Tirso - el mesonero
- Aquí huele a muerto... (¡pues yo no he sido!) (1990) - Vecino
- The Dumbfounded King (1991) - Capuchino
- El robobo de la jojoya (1991) - Prof. Bardenk
- Cautivos de la sombra (1994) - Perista
- La isla del diablo (1994) - Capitán Kraffa
- The City of Lost Children (1995) - Father

== See also ==
- Fernando Sancho

== Bibliography ==
- Weisser, Thomas (August 22, 2005). Spaghetti Westerns--the Good, the Bad and the Violent: A Comprehensive, Illustrated Filmography of 558 Eurowesterns and Their Personnel, 1961-1977. McFarland & Company. p. 498. ISBN 9780786424429.
