= Death Laid an Egg =

1968 film by Giulio Questi

- Italian film poster
- Directed by: Giulio Questi
- Written by: Franco Arcalli; Giulio Questi
- Produced by: Franco Marras
- Starring: Gina Lollobrigida; Jean-Louis Trintignant; Ewa Aulin; Jean Sobieski
- Cinematography: Dario Di Palma
- Edited by: Franco Arcalli
- Music by: Bruno Maderna
- Production companies: Summa Cinematografica; Cine Azimut; Les Films Corona
- Distributed by: Euro International Films
- Release date: January 9, 1968 (Italy)
- Running time: 110 minutes
- Countries: Italy; France
- Language: Italian

Death Laid an Egg (Italian: La morte ha fatto l'uovo) is a 1968 giallo film directed by Giulio Questi. Written by Questi and Franco Arcalli, the film stars Ewa Aulin, Gina Lollobrigida and Jean-Louis Trintignant.

== Plot ==
Married couple Anna and Marco run a hi-tech automated poultry farm, breeding boneless chickens. Unbeknownst to Anna, Marco is a serial killer, who lures prostitutes to motel rooms before stabbing them. The arrival of Anna's cousin Gabri further fragments the troubled marriage, as she and Marco begin an affair and conspire to run away together. However, Gabri is actually plotting with her husband Mondaini to kill Anna and frame Marco, as they have discovered Marco's secret. When Marco discovers Anna's body in his hotel room, he cleans the crime scene and takes the body back to the farm to dispose of it. What Gabri and Mondaini do not know is that Marco's fixation is not with killing prostitutes, but simply hiring them to role-play murders, letting them go safely and handsomely paid. At the farm, Marco falls into a machine used to grind chicken feed in which he was trying to dispose of Anna's body. When the police arrive, having responded to the "murder" at the hotel and then coming to the farm to investigate Marco's alleged activities, the police focus their attention on Gabri, suspecting her of committing the murder out of sibling jealousy. Gabri and Mondaini are eventually arrested for Anna's murder, as the farm chickens feed on Marco's ground corpse.

== Cast ==
- Gina Lollobrigida as Anna
- Jean-Louis Trintignant as Marco
- Ewa Aulin as Gabri
- Jean Sobieski as Mondaini
- Renato Romano as Luigi
- Cleofe Del Cile as Prostitute #1
- Biagio Pelligra as Chemical Operator
- Giulio Donnini as Hotel Manager
- Aldo Bonamano as Police Inspector
- Margherita Horowitz as Marco's Secretary
- Vittorio Andre
- Cleofe Del Cile
- Monica Millesi
- Ugo Arinolfi

== Production ==
Death Laid an Egg was directed by Giulio Questi, who co-wrote the screenplay with editor Franco Arcalli. The pair had collaborated the previous year on the Spaghetti Western film Se sei vivo spara, in the same roles.

== Release ==
Death Laid an Egg was released in Italy on January 9, 1968. The film has also been distributed internationally under the titles A Curious Way to Love, Death Trap and Plucked. It was re-released in France as Le Sadique de la Chambre 24 (transl. The Sadist in Room 24).

== Reception ==
The Monthly Film Bulletin declared the film as "a genuine curiosity" with its "bizarre eroticism" concluding it was "not uninteresting, but unfortunately has the effect of giving some of the digressions rather more weight than the control narrative."

Writing for AllMovie, Robert Firsching rated the film three stars out of five, and found it difficult to place in a genre, considering it a mix of giallo, science fiction and drug film elements. Firsching described the film as "deliriously strange", noting that it was "a must-see for genre fans"; he also stated parts of the film resemble David Lynch's Eraserhead. Luis Canales, in his book Imperial Gina, reports that the film "received lukewarm criticism" upon release, although he writes that both Questi and Lollobrigida were pleased with it. Gian Piero Brunetta, author of The History of Italian Cinema, considered the film to be "worth remembering", comparing it to the works of Luis Buñuel and Michelangelo Antonioni. Brunetta felt the film held several thematic undercurrents, dealing with the conditions of farm labourers and the changing social attitudes towards the class system in Italy. In March 2015 the film was re-released as part of the Malastrana Film Series in the event The Killer Must Kill Again!: Giallo Fever, Part 2 as part of the Anthology Film Archives in New York City over Malastrana Film Series on 35mm.

== Footnotes ==
=== References ===
- Brunetta, Gian Piero (2009). The History of Italian Cinema: A Guide to Italian Film from Its Origins to the Twenty-First Century. Princeton University Press. ISBN 978-0691119885.
- Canales, Luis (1990). Imperial Gina: The Strictly Unauthorized Biography of Gina Lollobrigida. Brandon Books. ISBN 0828319324.
- Luther-Smith, Adrian (1999). Blood and Black Lace: The Definitive Guide to Italian Sex and Horror Movies. Stray Cat Publishing Ltd. ISBN 0-9533261-1-X.
