= Jenny Tamburi =

Italian actress and television hostess

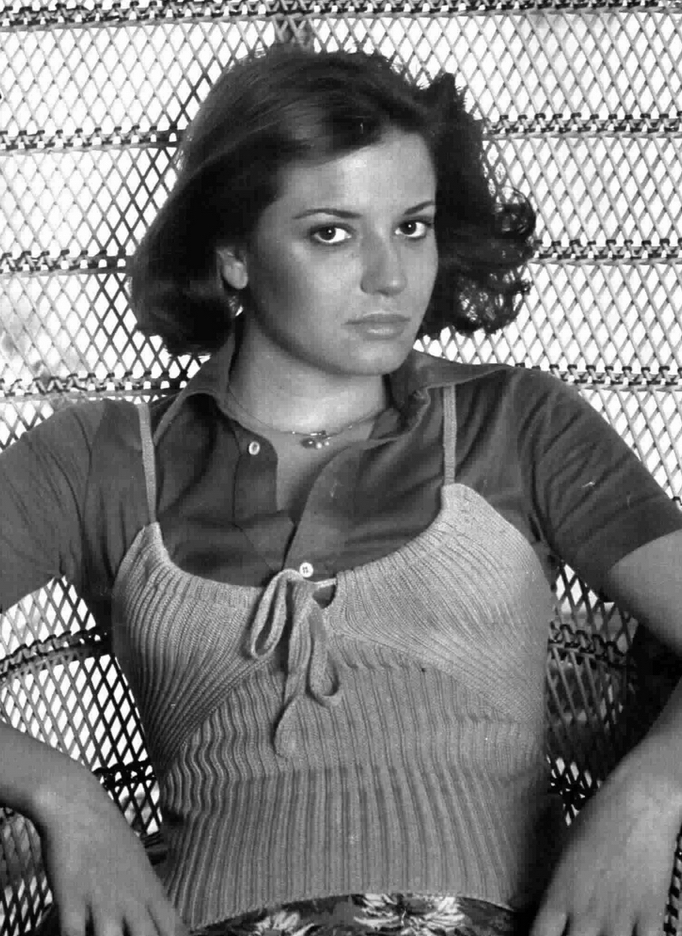
- Born: Luciana Tamburini; 27 November 1952; Rome, Italy
- Died: 1 March 2006 (aged 53); Rome, Italy
- Other name: Luciana della Robbia
- Occupations: Actress; Casting director
- Years active: 1970 - 2005

Jenny Tamburi (27 November 1952 – 1 March 2006), born as Luciana Tamburini, was an Italian actress and television hostess. Her first stage name was "Luciana della Robbia" and after her first film she changed it to "Jenny Tamburi".

Born in Rome, she debuted on stage with Johnny Dorelli at 17, in Aggiungi un posto a tavola. Her film debut was in 1970 in Vittorio Caprioli's Splendours and miseries of Madame Royale, opposite Ugo Tognazzi. Tamburi portrayed a femme fatale in La seduzione (1973). She was active in genre films, especially commedia sexy all'italiana and giallo films.

After retiring from acting she worked as a casting director and opened a drama school in Rome.

== Selected filmography ==
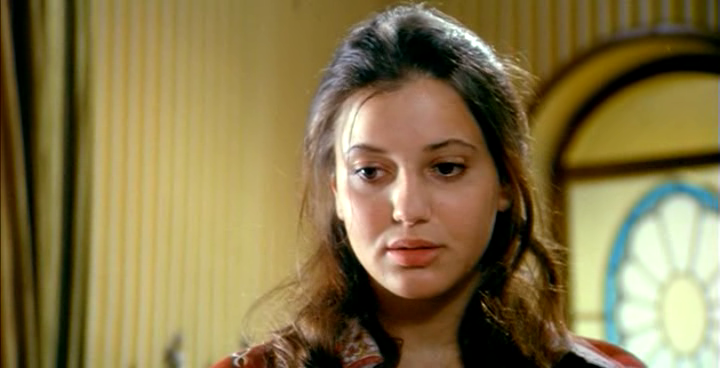
Jenny Tamburi in La seduzione (1973)

- Splendori e miserie di Madame Royale (1970) - Mimmina
- Smile Before Death (1972) - Nancy Thompson
- Fiorina la vacca (1972) - Zanetta - wife of Checco
- Women in Cell Block 7 (1973) - Daniela Vinci
- La seduzione (1973) - Graziella
- The Sinful Nuns of Saint Valentine (1974) - Lucita
- Morbosità (1974)
- La prova d'amore (1974)
- Scandal in the Family (1975) - Francesca
- The Suspicious Death of a Minor (1975) - Gloria
- Frankenstein - Italian Style (1975) - Janet
- Sins Without Intentions (1975) - Stefania
- Giovannino (1976) - Marcella
- Confessions of a Frustrated Housewife (1976) - Diana
- Blood and Bullets (1976) - Susan
- Donna... cosa si fa per te (1976) - Sole
- Sette note in nero (1977) - Bruna
- Melodrammore (1977) - Priscilla Mulinetti
- Dove volano i corvi d'argento (1977) - Giovannangela
- Liquirizia (1979) - Marina
- Bello di mamma (1980) - Maddalena Trinacria
- Il tango della gelosia (1981) - Nunzia
- Pierino la peste alla riscossa (1982) - Signorina Bonazzi
- Lo studente (1983) - Claudia
- Voglia di guardare (1986) - Christina
