= Long Lasting Days =

- Directed by: Ferdinando Baldi
- Written by: Ferdinando Baldi
- Produced by: Manolo Bolognini
- Starring: Mino Reitano; Ewa Aulin
- Cinematography: Aiace Parolin
- Music by: Franco Reitano; Mino Reitano
- Release date: 1973
- Language: Italian

Long Lasting Days (Italian: Una vita lunga un giorno) is a 1973 Italian crime drama film written and directed by Ferdinando Baldi and starring Mino Reitano, Ewa Aulin and Philippe Leroy.

== Plot ==
A man falls in love with a beautiful young woman and puts his life in danger to raise the money to finance her hospital treatment.

== Cast ==
- Mino Reitano as Andrea Rispoli
- Ewa Aulin as Anna Andersson
- Philippe Leroy as Philippe
- Eva Czemerys as Frieda
- Luciano Catenacci as Spyros
- Franco Ressel as The Doctor
- Franco Fantasia as Manolo
- Dante Maggio as "Uncle" Giovanni
- Nello Pazzafini as Nello
