= Mino Reitano =

Italian singer, songwriter, actor (1944–2009)

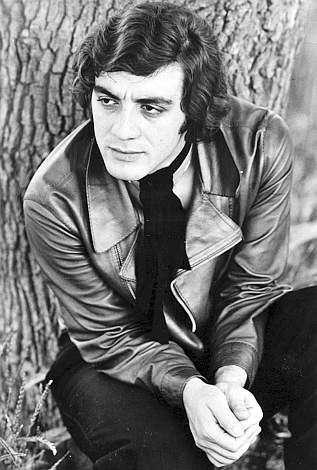
- Mino Reitano in the 1970s

Background information
- Born: Beniamino Reitano; 7 December 1944; Fiumara, Calabria, Kingdom of Italy
- Died: 27 January 2009 (aged 64) Agrate Brianza, Lombardy, Italy
- Occupations: Singer; actor
- Years active: 1960–2007
- Website: minoreitano.it

Beniamino "Mino" Reitano (7 December 1944 – 27 January 2009) was an Italian singer, songwriter and actor.

Reitano was born in Fiumara, a small village in Calabria. His father, an employee at the local railway station, was very passionate about music, and encouraged all his sons to learn to play an instrument. After a spell in the local brass band, Reitano moved to Reggio Calabria, where he studied at the Francesco Cilea Conservatory for eight years, learning piano, trumpet, and violin. In the late 1950s, Reitano moved with his brothers to Hamburg, where they formed a rock'n'roll band, Benjamin & His Brothers. They often played at the Star-Club, sharing the bill with Rory Storm, Tony Sheridan and The Beatles. After a couple of years, Reitano returned to Italy, where he recorded his first single, "Twist Time". After a successful performance at the Castrocaro Music Festival, he was offered a contract with the Italian label Dischi Ricordi, and in 1967 he participated for the first time at the Sanremo Festival. His first commercial hit was "Avevo un cuore (che ti amava tanto)" (1968).

Reitano was an actor and starred in such films as Povero Cristo, I'm Crazy About Iris Blond and Long Lasting Days.

Reitano died in Agrate Brianza, aged 64, of intestinal cancer, after a long period of illness.

== Discography ==
- 1969 – Mino canta Reitano (Ariston Records, AR 10031)
- 1971 – L'uomo e la valigia (Durium, ms AI 77266)
- 1972 – Ti amo tanto tanto (Durium, ms AI 77296)
- 1973 – Partito per amore (Durium, ms AI 77322)
- 1974 – Tutto Mino (Durium, ms AI 77338)
- 1975 – Dedicato a Frank (Durium, ms AI 77361)
- 1976 – Omaggio alla mia terra (Durium, ms AI 77376)
- 1976 – I miei successi (Ariston Records)
- 1976 – Sogno d'amore (Durium, ms AI 77388)
- 1980 – OK Mister (Mister, MRL 1001)
- 1980 – Le più belle canzoni per bambini (Mister, SM 702)
- 1981 – Omaggio a Napoli (Mister, MRL 1002)
- 1985 – Isole d'amore (Five Record, FM 13542)
- 1986 – I cantautori (Five Record, FM 13564)
- 1987 – Questo uomo ti ama (Five Record)
- 1990 – Vorrei (Fonit Cetra)
- 1991 – Mino Reitano Story (Air Plane APCD 2002)
- 1992 – Ma ti sei chiesto mai (Fonit Cetra, MFLP 020)
- 1994 – Canne al vento (BMG)
- 1996 – Il meglio – Dal vivo (DV More Record, DV 2027) (live)
- 1999 – Musica tua – i Grandi Successi (anthology)
- 2000 – Flashback – i Grandi successi originali (anthology)
- 2002 – La mia canzone... le mie canzoni (Cassiopea Music, CAS 507630 2)
- 2004 – Italia – Dal vivo (DV More Record DV 6744) (live)
