= List of Techniscope films =

This is an incomplete list of notable films shot in the Techniscope format. As of May 2011, The Internet Movie Database lists over 1,200 films shot in the Techniscope format. Notable titles include:

- The Pharaohs' Woman (1960)
- The Bacchantes (1961)
- The Invincible Gladiator (1961)
- The Centurion (1961) (as Euroscope)
- The Rebel Gladiators (1962)
- Gladiators 7 (1962)
- Kerim, Son of the Sheik (1962) (as Euroscope)
- Gladiator of Rome (1962) (as Euroscope)
- Yesterday, Today and Tomorrow (1963)
- Death Drums Along the River (1963)
- Sandokan the Great (1963)
- Goliath and the Sins of Babylon (1963)
- The Beatles Come to Town (1963) (short)
- Goliath and the Rebel Slave (1963) (as Euroscope)
- Hercules vs. Moloch (1963) (as Euroscope)
- Roustabout (1964)
- Hercules the Invincible (1964)
- Hercules Against the Sons of the Sun (1964)
- Law of the Lawless (1964)
- Coast of Skeletons (1964)
- Curse of the Mummy's Tomb (1964)
- East of Sudan (1964)
- A Fistful of Dollars (1964)
- Apache Fury (1964)
- Robinson Crusoe on Mars (1964)
- Stage to Thunder Rock (1964)
- Guerillas in Pink Lace (1964)
- Wonderful Life (US: Swingers' Paradise, 1964)
- Pirates of Malaysia (1964)
- Victim Five (1964)
- Devil of the Desert Against the Son of Hercules (1964)
- Messalina vs. the Son of Hercules (1964)
- Buffalo Bill, Hero of the Far West (1964)
- Gladiators Seven (1964)
- The Magnificent Gladiator (1964)
- Triumph of the Ten Gladiators (1964)
- Spartacus and the Ten Gladiators (1964)
- Samson vs. the Giant King (1964)
- Maciste in King Solomon's Mines (1964)
- Revolt of the Praetorians (1964)
- Seven Slaves Against the World (1964)
- 100 Horsemen (1964)
- Terror of the Steppes (1964)
- Secret of the Sphinx (1964)
- Desert Raiders (1964)
- Sailors (1964)
- Hercules Against the Moon Men (1964) (as Cromoscope)
- The Triumph of Hercules (1964) (as Cromoscope)
- Romeo and Juliet (1964) (as Cromoscope)
- Thunder of Battle (1964) (as Euroscope)
- The Lion of Thebes (1964) (as Euroscope)
- Arizona Raiders (1965)
- Black Spurs (1965)
- Deadwood '76 (1965)
- Sandy the Seal (1965)
- Dr. Terror's House of Horrors (1965)
- Dr. Who and the Daleks (1965)
- Town Tamer (1965)
- For a Few Dollars More (1965)
- Pierrot le fou (1965)
- Pop Gear (1965)
- The Ipcress File (1965)
- Every Day's a Holiday (1965)
- The Skull (1965)
- Apache Uprising (1965)
- The Big Restaurant (1965)
- Fire Over Rome (1965)
- Hercules the Avenger (1965)
- The Hell of Manitoba (1965)
- Gold Train (1965)
- Agent 077: From the Orient with Fury (1965)
- Agent 077: Mission Bloody Mary (1965)
- Espionage in Lisbon (1965)
- Operation Goldsinger (1965)
- Agent 3S3: Passport to Hell (1965)
- Operation Counterspy (1965)
- Desperate Mission (1965)
- Secret Agent Fireball (1965)
- Agente X 1-7 operazione Oceano (1965)
- Operation Atlantis (1965)
- Two Mafiosi Against Goldginger (1965)
- War Italian Style (1965)
- Man from Canyon City (1965)
- Doc, Hands of Steel (1965)
- A Pistol for Ringo (1965)
- The Return of Ringo (1965)
- Oklahoma John (1965)
- The Last Tomahawk (1965)
- The Falcon of the Desert (1965)
- I've Gotta Horse (1965)
- Man Called Gringo (1965)
- Diamond Walkers (1965)
- The Wise Guys (1965)
- Made in Italy (1965)
- Hard Time for Princes (1965)
- Here Come the Berserkers (1965)
- Wild Kurdistan (1965)
- Kingdom of the Silver Lion (1965)
- Blood for a Silver Dollar (1965) (as Euroscope)
- Made in U.S.A (1966)
- Alfie (1966)
- How to Rob the Bank of Italy (1966)
- Texas Across the River (1966)
- Lightning Bolt (1966)
- Dracula: Prince of Darkness (1966)
- The Appaloosa (1966)
- Johnny Reno (1966)
- King of Hearts (1966)
- Arizona Colt (1966)
- 4 Dollars of Revenge (1966)
- Beau Geste (1966)
- Daleks – Invasion Earth: 2150 A.D. (1966)
- The Psychopath (1966)
- Deadlier Than the Male (1966)
- The Ghost and Mr. Chicken (1966)
- A Bullet for the General (1966)
- The Good, the Bad and the Ugly (1966)
- Nashville Rebel (1966)
- Kiss Kiss...Bang Bang (1966)
- The Projected Man (1966)
- Thunderbirds Are GO (1966)
- Who Wants to Kill Jessie? (1966)
- Waco (1966)
- Navajo Joe (1966)
- Africa Addio (1966)
- Special Mission Lady Chaplin (1966)
- Password: Kill Agent Gordon (1966)
- Requiem for a Secret Agent (1966)
- To Skin a Spy (1966)
- Z7 Operation Rembrandt (1966)
- Spies Strike Silently (1966)
- Our Man in Casablanca (1966)
- The Wacky World of James Tont (1966)
- The Spy with Ten Faces (1966)
- Kriminal (1966)
- Agent X-77 Orders to Kill (1966)
- Suicide Mission to Singapore (1966)
- Agent 3S3: Massacre in the Sun (1966)
- Blood at Sundown (1966)
- The Hills Run Red (1966)
- Fort Yuma Gold (1966)
- Django Shoots First (1966)
- Dollar of Fire (1966)
- Seven Dollars on the Red (1966)
- Seven Guns for the MacGregors (1966)
- Savage Gringo (1966)
- Seven Pistols for a Gringo (1966)
- For One Thousand Dollars Per Day (1966)
- Sugar Colt (1966)
- The Sea Pirate (1966)
- The Murder Clinic (1966)
- Incident at Phantom Hill (1966)
- Gambit (1966)
- The Devil in Love (1966)
- Let's Not Get Angry (1966)
- Two Mafiamen Against Al Capone (1966)
- The Spy Pit (1966)
- Goal! World Cup 1966 (1966)
- ...And Now Miguel (1966)
- Who Killed Johnny R.? (1966)
- Superargo Versus Diabolicus (1966) (as Cromoscope)
- For a Few Dollars Less (1966) (as Cromoscope)
- Massacre Time (1966) (as Cromoscope)
- The She Beast (1966) (as Cromoscope)
- Two or Three Things I Know About Her (1967)
- Clambake (1967)
- Red Tomahawk (1967)
- God Forgives... I Don't! (1967)
- The Big Gundown (1967)
- Gunfight in Abilene (1967)
- Tobruk (1967)
- OK Connery (1967)
- Hostile Guns (1967)
- Fort Utah (1967)
- Django Kill... If You Live, Shoot! (1967)
- Halleluja for Django (1967)
- Your Turn to Die (1967)
- Dirty Heroes (1967)
- Grand Slam (1967)
- 15 Scaffolds for a Murderer (1967)
- Any Gun Can Play (1967)
- The Last Adventure (1967)
- Born to Kill (1967)
- Dakota Joe (1967)
- Day of Anger (1967)
- Fury of Johnny Kid (1967)
- Dynamite Joe (1967)
- The Dirty Outlaws (1967)
- Renegade Riders (1967)
- Desert Commandos (1967)
- Rita of the West (1967)
- The Last Killer (1967)
- Poker with Pistols (1967)
- Death Rides a Horse (1967)
- Face to Face (1967)
- Long Days of Vengeance (1967)
- Man, Pride and Vengeance (1967)
- Ten Thousand Dollars for a Massacre (1967)
- Death Does Not Count the Dollars (1967)
- Day of Violence (1967)
- Argoman the Fantastic Superman (1967)
- Goldface, the Fantastic Superman (1967)
- Tiffany Memorandum (1967)
- Operation St. Peter's (1967)
- Avenger X (1967)
- The Million Eyes of Sumuru (1967)
- The Naked Runner (1967)
- Mexican Slayride (1967)
- Blueprint for a Massacre (1967)
- The Devil's Man (1967)
- An Idiot in Paris (1967)
- Maneater of Hydra (1967)
- An Italian in America (1967)
- It's a Bikini World (1967)
- Games (1967)
- The Wanderer (1967)
- Come rubammo la bomba atomica (1967)
- Il lungo, il corto, il gatto (1967)
- Three Nights of Love (1967)
- Bewitched Love (1967)
- Her Harem (1967)
- Assassination (1967)
- Shock Troops (1967)
- The House of 1,000 Dolls (1967)
- Five Golden Dragons (1967)
- Mission Stardust (1967)
- Massacre Mania (1967) (as Cromoscope)
- Red Blood, Yellow Gold (1967) (as Cromoscope)
- Death Rides Along (1967) (as Cromoscope)
- John the Bastard (1967) (as Cromoscope)
- Vengeance is Mine (1967) (as Cromoscope)
- No Death Without Dollars (1967) (as Cromoscope)
- Golden Chameleon (1967) (as Cromoscope)
- Last of the Badmen (1967) (as Euroscope)
- The Glory Stompers (1967) (as Colorscope)
- Assignment K (1968)
- Arizona Bushwhackers (1968)
- Counterpoint (1968)
- Once Upon a Time in the West (1968)
- The Secret War of Harry Frigg (1968)
- Charly (1968)
- Buckskin (1968)
- Thunderbird 6 (1968)
- The Shakiest Gun in the West (1968)
- Rogue's Gallery (1968)
- Vengeance (1968)
- Dead Men Don't Count (1968)
- The Mercenary (1968)
- The Last Mercenary (1968)
- The Ruthless Four (1968)
- The Fuller Report (1968)
- Train for Durango (1968)
- The Moment to Kill (1968)
- Pistol for a Hundred Coffins (1968)
- Day After Tomorrow (1968)
- Beyond the Law (1968)
- Ace High (1968)
- Kill Them All and Come Back Alone (1968)
- Johnny Hamlet (1968)
- The Valley of Death (1968)
- Between God, the Devil and a Winchester (1968)
- Rome Like Chicago (1968)
- Days of Fire (1968)
- Satanik (1968)
- Gatling Gun (1968)
- A Hole in the Forehead (1968)
- Death Sentence (1968)
- Bandits in Milan (1968)
- Frame Up (1968)
- In Enemy Country (1968)
- The Hell with Heroes (1968)
- Diary of a Schizophrenic Girl (1968)
- The Protagonists (1968)
- Dismissed on His Wedding Night (1968)
- Did You Hear the One About the Traveling Saleslady? (1968)
- P.J. (1968)
- House of Cards (1968)
- A Lovely Way to Die (1968)
- The Nephews of Zorro (1968)
- A Sky Full of Stars for a Roof (1968) (as Cromoscope)
- God Made Them... I Kill Them (1968) (as Cromoscope)
- Superargo and the Faceless Giants (1968) (as Cromoscope)
- The Young, the Evil and the Savage (1968) (as Cromoscope)
- The Sweet Body of Deborah (1968) (as Cromoscope)
- Run, Man, Run (1968) (as Cromoscope)
- Hell in Normandy (1968) (as Cromoscope)
- The Two Crusaders (1968) (as Cromoscope)
- The Vatican Affair (1968) (as Colorscope)
- The Last Roman (1968-69)
- The Olympics in Mexico (1969)
- Boot Hill (1969)
- Sabata (1969)
- Django the Bastard (1969)
- The Forgotten Pistolero (1969)
- Garringo (1969)
- Love and Anger (1969)
- Metti, una sera a cena (1969)
- Normal Young Man (1969)
- I See Naked (1969)
- Twenty Thousand Dollars for Seven (1969)
- The Specialists (1969)
- Tepepa (1969)
- Night of the Serpent (1969)
- The Price of Power (1969)
- The Avenger, Zorro (1969)
- Machine Gun McCain (1969)
- Bootleggers (1969)
- Gangster's Law (1969)
- Diary of a Telephone Operator (1969)
- Lost in the Desert (1969)
- Ådalen 31 (1969)
- Angel in My Pocket (1969)
- Police Chief Pepe (1969)
- War Devils (1969)
- The Tough and the Mighty (1969)
- The Rage Within (1969)
- Orgasmo (1969) (as Cromoscope)
- So Sweet... So Perverse (1969) (as Cromoscope)
- Battle of the Commandos (1969) (as Cromoscope)
- Salt in the Wound (1969) (as Cromoscope)
- A Noose for Django (1969) (as Cromoscope)
- Five for Hell (1969) (as Cromoscope)
- I am Sartana, Your Angel of Death (1969) (as Cromoscope)
- The Battle of El Alamein (1969) (as Cromoscope)
- The Bird with the Crystal Plumage (1970)
- Five Bloody Graves (1970)
- The Girls from Thunder Strip (1970)
- Adiós, Sabata (1970)
- A Quiet Place to Kill (1970)
- Mr. Superinvisible (1970)
- And God Said to Cain (1970)
- Arizona Colt Returns (1970)
- Sartana in the Valley of Death (1970)
- Sartana's Here... Trade Your Pistol for a Coffin (1970)
- Have a Good Funeral, My Friend... Sartana Will Pay (1970)
- A Man Called Sledge (1970)
- Clegg (1970)
- Rough Justice (1970)
- Compañeros (1970)
- Hey Amigo! A Toast to Your Death (1970)
- Viva Cangaceiro (1970)
- The Bloody Judge (1970)
- Forbidden Photos of a Lady Above Suspicion (1970)
- Kill the Fatted Calf and Roast It (1970)
- The Weekend Murders (1970)
- A Suitcase for a Corpse (1970)
- Two Women in Gold (1970)
- A Girl Called Jules (1970)
- May Morning (1970)
- The Syndicate: A Death in the Family (1970)
- Mafia Connection (1970)
- Operation Snafu (1970)
- Eugenie... The Story of Her Journey into Perversion (1970)
- Ninì Tirabusciò: The Woman Who Invented "The Move" (1970)
- Higher and Higher (1970)
- They Call Me Trinity (1970) (as Cromoscope)
- Light the Fuse... Sartana Is Coming (1970) (as Cromoscope)
- Your Hands on My Body (1970) (as Cromoscope)
- Sartana Kills Them All (1970) (as Reversalscope)
- Black Killer (1971)
- Blue Water, White Death (1971)
- Duck, You Sucker! (1971)
- Blackie the Pirate (1971)
- The Brotherhood of Satan (1971)
- THX 1138 (1971)
- Two-Lane Blacktop (1971)
- Return of Sabata (1971)
- Long Live Your Death (1971)
- Shoot the Living and Pray for the Dead (1971)
- The Last Traitor (1971)
- Desert of Fire (1971)
- Goodbye Uncle Tom (1971)
- The Cat o' Nine Tails (1971)
- Four Flies on Grey Velvet (1971)
- Web of the Spider (1971)
- Drummer of Vengeance (1971)
- The Bloodstained Butterfly (1971)
- Oasis of Fear (1971)
- The Night Evelyn Came Out of the Grave (1971)
- Human Cobras (1971)
- Slaughter Hotel (1971)
- The Designated Victim (1971)
- Short Night of Glass Dolls (1971)
- Marta (1971)
- The Great Swindle (1971)
- The Most Beautiful Wife (1971)
- When Men Carried Clubs and Women Played Ding-Dong (1971)
- Come Together (1971)
- Confessions of a Police Captain (1971)
- Holy Water Joe (1971)
- Blindman (1971)
- The Naked Cello (1971)
- That's How We Women Are (1971)
- Vengeance Is a Dish Served Cold (1971)
- Ivanhoe, the Norman Swordsman (1971)
- Lover of the Great Bear (1971)
- Long Live Robin Hood (1971)
- The Clan of the Two Borsalinos (1971)
- Stanza 17-17 palazzo delle tasse, ufficio imposte (1971)
- Trinity Is Still My Name (1971) (as Cromoscope)
- They Call Him Cemetery (1971) (as Cromoscope)
- The Strange Vice of Mrs. Wardh (1971) (as Cromoscope)
- The Case of the Scorpion's Tail (1971) (as Cromoscope)
- Death Walks on High Heels (1971) (as Cromoscope)
- W Django! (1971) (as Cromoscope)
- Blood of Ghastly Horror (1972)
- Man of the East (1972)
- It Can Be Done Amigo (1972)
- A Reason to Live, a Reason to Die (1972)
- The Red Queen Kills Seven Times (1972)
- Don't Torture a Duckling (1972)
- Seven Blood-Stained Orchids (1972)
- Knife of Ice (1972)
- Hector the Mighty (1972)
- Return of Halleluja (1972)
- All the Colors of the Dark (1972)
- Who Saw Her Die? (1972)
- Death Walks at Midnight (1972)
- Crimes of the Black Cat (1972)
- My Dear Killer (1972)
- Spirits of Death (1972)
- The Case of the Bloody Iris (1972)
- Sonny and Jed (1972)
- Boccaccio (1972)
- The Black Decameron (1972)
- The Mighty Anselmo and His Squire (1972)
- The Big Bust Out (1972)
- Sting of the West (1972)
- Life Is Tough, Eh Providence? (1972)
- Man Called Amen (1972)
- Joe Dakota (1972)
- The Grand Duel (1972)
- Two Sons of Trinity (1972)
- Alleluja & Sartana are Sons... Sons of God (1972)
- Panhandle 38 (1972)
- Ben and Charlie (1972)
- The Sicilian Connection (1972)
- Execution Squad (1972)
- Ubalda, All Naked and Warm (1972)
- Naughty Nun (1972)
- The Ribald Decameron (1972)
- The Night of the Devils (1972)
- Ripped Off (1972)
- Hearth Fires (1972)
- The Yes Girls (1972)
- Anna: the Pleasure, the Torment (1972)
- The Master Touch (1972)
- Man from the Deep River (1972)
- The Hassled Hooker (1972)
- The Demons (1972)
- Amuck! (1972) (as Cromoscope)
- The Holy Mountain (1973)
- American Graffiti (1973)
- ... All the Way, Boys! (1973)
- Dead People (1973)
- Seven Deaths in the Cat's Eye (1973)
- The Flower with the Petals of Steel (1973)
- The Bloodstained Lawn (1973)
- Mr. Hercules Against Karate (1973)
- Man with the Golden Winchester (1973)
- Supermen Against the Orient (1973)
- The Three Musketeers of the West (1973)
- Deaf Smith & Johnny Ears (1973)
- The Big Family (1973)
- Giovannona Long-Thigh (1973)
- Malicious (1973)
- Sex of the Witch (1973)
- Dirty Weekend (1973)
- Gang War in Milan (1973)
- The Fighting Fist of Shanghai Joe (1973)
- The Violent Professionals (1973)
- Man Called Invincible (1973)
- The Heroes (1973)
- The Funny Face of the Godfather (1973)
- Long Lasting Days (1973)
- One Hamlet Less (1973)
- Big Zapper (1973)
- The Magnificent Dare Devil (1973)
- Battle of the Amazons (1973)
- Those Dirty Dogs (1973) (as Cromoscope)
- The Bloody Hands of the Law (1973) (as Reversalscope)
- Spasmo (1974)
- What Have They Done to Your Daughters? (1974)
- Five Women for the Killer (1974)
- Cry of a Prostitute (1974)
- The Beautiful Summer (1974)
- Almost Human (1974)
- The Visitor (1974)
- The Arena (1974)
- The Sinful Nuns of Saint Valentine (1974)
- Innocence and Desire (1974)
- Super Stooges vs. the Wonder Women (1974)
- Akenfield (1974)
- Alien Thunder (1974)
- The Swordsman (1974)
- Young Lucrezia (1974)
- Il figlio della sepolta viva (1974)
- Dakota (1974)
- A Boy and His Dog (1975)
- My Friends (1975)
- A Genius, Two Partners and a Dupe (1975)
- Eyeball (1975)
- The White, the Yellow, and the Black (1975)
- Silent Action (1975)
- The Suspicious Death of a Minor (1975)
- Strip Nude for Your Killer (1975)
- Gambling City (1975)
- Convoy Buddies (1975)
- We Are No Angels (1975)
- The Teasers (1975)
- Killer Cop (1975)
- Reflections in Black (1975)
- The Killer Must Kill Again (1975)
- Get Mean (1975)
- The Actor and the Savages (1975)
- Africa Express (1975)
- Deep Red (1975) (as Reversalscope)
- Syndicate Sadists (1975) (as Reversalscope)
- Manhunt in the City (1975) (as Reversalscope)
- Keoma (1976)
- Confessions of a Lady Cop (1976)
- My Father's Private Secretary (1976)
- The Lady Medic (1976)
- School Days (1976)
- The Tough Ones (1976)
- Free Hand for a Tough Cop (1976)
- Safari Express (1976)
- Sexycop (1976)
- Smooth Velvet, Raw Silk (1976)
- Goodbye, Norma Jean (1976)
- The Adventures of Frontier Fremont (1976)
- Spy Story (1976)
- Death Machines (1976)
- Last Cannibal World (1977)
- Emanuelle and the Last Cannibals (1977)
- Beast with a Gun (1977)
- California (1977)
- No. 1 of the Secret Service (1977)
- The Cynic, the Rat and the Fist (1977)
- Death Steps in the Dark (1977)
- The Rip-off (1977)
- Mannaja (1977) (as Reversalscope)
- The Bees (1978)
- Silver Saddle (1978)
- They Called Him Bulldozer (1978)
- The Perfect Crime (1978)
- The Last House on the Beach (1978)
- Deadly Chase (1978)
- Red Rings of Fear (1978)
- Last Feelings (1978)
- Slave of the Cannibal God (1978) (as Reversalscope)
- Zombi 2 (1979)
- Licensed to Love and Kill (1979)
- From Corleone to Brooklyn (1979)
- Island of the Fishmen (1979) (as Reversalscope)
- The Great Alligator River (1979) (as Reversalscope)
- Concorde Affaire '79 (1979) (as Reversalscope)
- The Gods Must Be Crazy (1980)
- Nightmare City (1980)
- The Beyond (1981)
- The Black Cat (1981)
- The Ones and the Others (1981)
- The House by the Cemetery (1981) (as Reversalscope)
- Manhattan Baby (1982)
- How Sleep the Brave (1982)
- The New York Ripper (1982) (as Reversalscope)
- Édith et Marcel (1983)
- Tornado: The Last Blood (1983)
- The Noah's Ark Principle (1984)
- Code Name: Wild Geese (1984)
- Viva la vie (1984)
- Otto – Der Film (1985)
- Partir, revenir (1985)
- A Man and a Woman: 20 Years Later (1986)
- Attention bandits! (1987)
- Itinerary of a Spoiled Child (1988)
- Indio (1989)
- There Were Days... and Moons (1990)
- Titanic (1997) (the underwater scenes, digitally opened up to 16:9 in 2012 restoration)
- Panic Room (2002) (all slow-motion sequences)
- Frostbite (2006)
- Hunger (2008)
- Bran Nu Dae (2009)
- Beyond the Black Rainbow (2010)
- Expecting Mary (2010)
- The Fighter (2010)
- Citizen Gangster (2011)
- Everywhere and Nowhere (2011)
- Shame (2011)
- Silver Linings Playbook (2012)
- House at the End of the Street (2012)
- Möbius (2013)
- The Place Beyond the Pines (2013)
- Alex Cross (2013)
- Oldboy (2013)
- American Hustle (2013)
- I, Tonya (2017)
- Good Time (2017)
- Sound of Metal (2019)
