= Sergio Grieco =

Italian film director and screenwriter

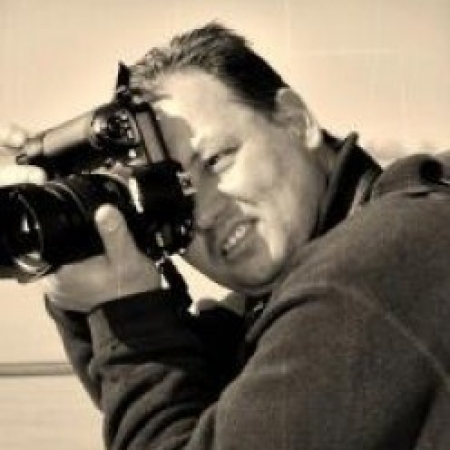
- Born: 13 January 1917; Codevigo, Veneto, Italy
- Died: 30 March 1982 (aged 65); Rome, Italy
- Occupations: Film director Screenwriter
- Years active: 1950–1977

Signature
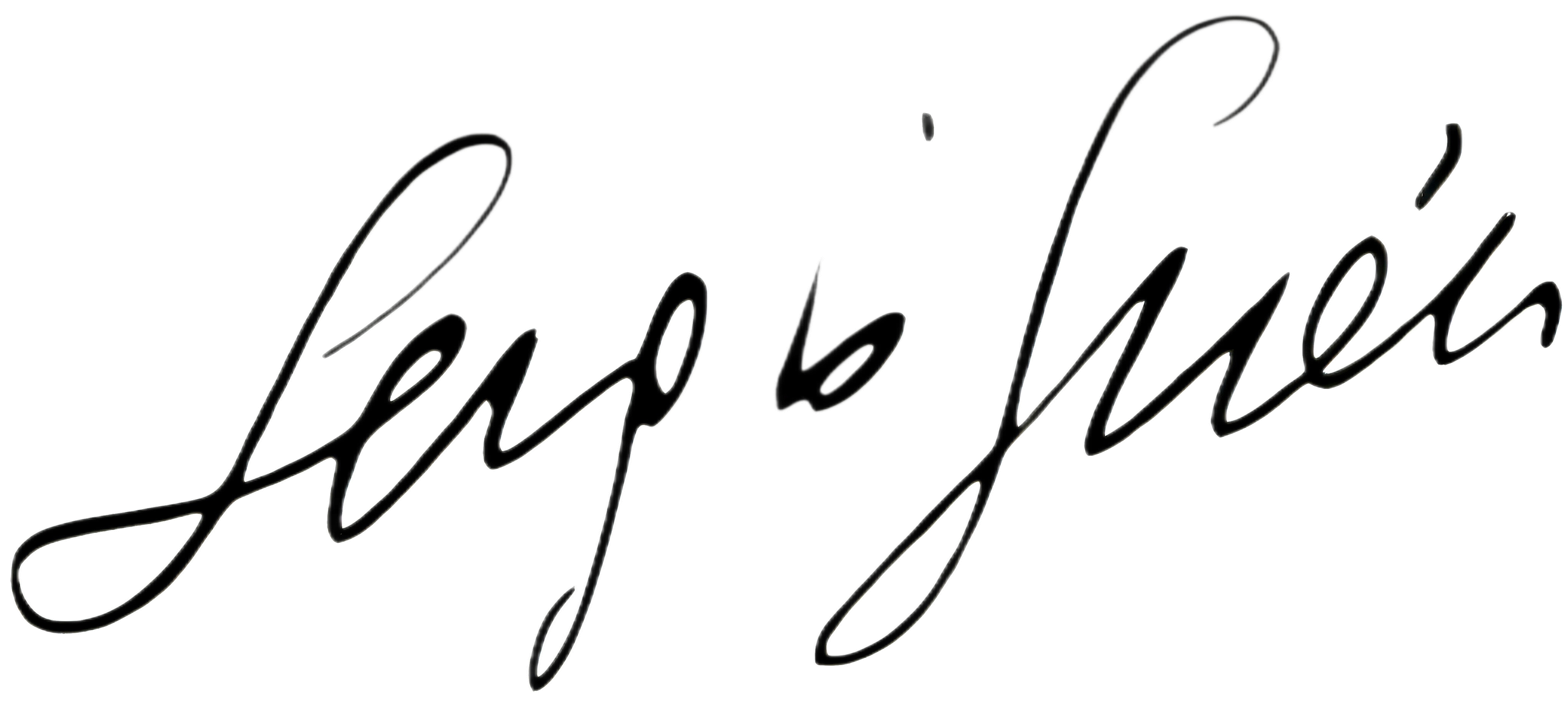

Sergio Grieco (13 January 1917 – 30 March 1982) was an Italian film director and screenwriter. In addition to working under his own name, he also used the pseudonym Terence Hathaway.

== Biography ==
Sergio Grieco was born on 13 January 1917 in Codevigo, Veneto, Italy. His father was the Italian Communist politician Ruggero Grieco. He was taken to France by his parents as a baby, and attended schools in Paris. His interest in cinema began after winning a school art contest; a prize which included being able to assist the operator of the school's cinema. After completing high school, he began his career in film in Paris as an assistant to avant-garde film maker Germaine Dulac.

Grieco traveled to Russia, Soviet Union for a family event, and there obtained employment as third assistant to Nikolai Ekk. For Ekk he worked on the first Soviet sound film Road to Life (1931). He married a Russian woman and had children there. He began his Italian film career as a script supervisor in 1939, working his way up to an assistant director the following year. In 1949 he worked as an assistant to René Clément on his film The Walls of Malapaga (1949).

His directorial debut was Il sentiero dell'odio (1950), beginning a prolific career in a variety of genres. He met his wife Teresa Terrone (renamed Susan Terry by her agent), who appeared in several of his films, beginning with The Mysterious Swordsman/Lo spadaccino misterioso in 1955.

He directed nearly 40 films between 1950 and 1977, often also writing his own screenplays. Grieco is best known for his adventure, swashbuckler, sword and sandal and Eurospy films with Ken Clark, including the Secret Agent 077 series of imitation James Bond films, which he directed under the pseudonym 'Terence Hathaway' (see filmography). His final film was The Mad Dog Killer (1977). Grieco also co-wrote the screenplay for The Inglorious Bastards (1978).

His nephew is David Grieco, who has worked as a writer, producer and director.

Grieco died on 30 March 1982 in Rome.

== Filmography as director ==
- Il sentiero dell'odio (1950)
- Primo premio: Mariarosa (1952)
- Non è vero... ma ci credo (1952)
- I morti non pagano tasse (1952)
- Fermi tutti... arrivo io! (1953)
- Loving You Is My Sin (1954)
- Island Sinner (with Sergio Corbucci) (1954)
- Tua per la vita (1955)
- The Violent Patriot (1956)
- The Mysterious Swordsman (1956)
- The Black Devil (1957)
- Pirate of the Black Hawk (1958)
- Pia of Ptolomey (1958)
- Ciao, ciao bambina! (1959)
- The Nights of Lucretia Borgia (1959)
- The Loves of Salammbo (1960)
- The Huns (1960)
- Slave of Rome (1961)
- Julius Caesar Against the Pirates (1962)
- Il capitano di ferro (Revenge of the Mercenaries, 1962)
- Son of the Circus (1963)
- La chica del trébol (1964)
- Sword of the Empire (1964)
- Agent 077: Mission Bloody Mary (as Terence Hathaway) (1965)
- Agent 077: From the Orient with Fury (as Terence Hathaway) (1965)
- Password: Kill Agent Gordon (as Terence Hathaway) (with Alberto De Martino) (1966)
- Special Mission Lady Chaplin (as Terence Hathaway) (1966)
- Rififi in Amsterdam (as Terence Hathaway) (1966)
- Argoman the Fantastic Superman (as Terence Hathaway) (1967)
- Tiffany Memorandum (as Terence Hathaway) (1967)
- The Fuller Report (as Terence Hathaway) (1968)
- Il sergente Klems (1971)
- Where the Bullets Fly (1972)
- The Sinful Nuns of Saint Valentine (1974)
- One Man Against the Organization (1975)
- La nipote del prete (1976)
- Terror in Rome (1976)
- Il signor Ministro li pretese tutti e subito (as Sergio Alessandrini) (1977)
- The Mad Dog Killer (1977)

== External links and sources ==
- Sergio Grieco at IMDb
- Biography at Mymovies.it
