= Silver Saddle =

1978 film directed by Lucio Fulci

- Italian theatrical release poster
- Directed by: Lucio Fulci
- Written by: Adriano Bolzoni
- Produced by: Piero Donati
- Starring: Giuliano Gemma; Sven Valsecchi; Ettore Manni; Gianni De Luigi; Cinzia Monreale; Licinia Lentini; Donald O'Brien; Aldo Sambrell; Philippe Hersent; Geoffrey Lewis
- Cinematography: Sergio Salvati
- Edited by: Ornella Micheli
- Music by: Franco Bixio; Fabio Frizzi; Vince Tempera
- Distributed by: Adria Filmverleih; Jupiter-Film
- Release dates: 20 April 1978 (Italy); 27 April 1979 (West Germany)
- Running time: 94 minutes
- Country: Italy
- Language: Italian
- Box office: 237,000,000 (ITL)

Silver Saddle (Italian: Sella d'argento; also released under the titles The Man in the Silver Saddle and They Died With Their Boots On) is a 1978 spaghetti Western. It is the third and final western directed by Lucio Fulci and one of the last spaghetti Westerns to be produced by a European studio. The film was based on an original story written by screenwriter Adriano Bolzoni and directed by Fulci for the Italian studio Rizzoli Film Productions.

This was also the final western film role for leading man Giuliano Gemma, whose breakout role was in the 1965 spaghetti western A Pistol for Ringo, although he would continue acting in other genres for more than twenty years afterwards. Along with Gemma, the film also starred Sven Valsecchi, Ettore Manni, Gianni De Luigi, Cinzia Monreale, Licinia Lentini, Donald O'Brien, Aldo Sambrell, Philippe Hersent and Geoffrey Lewis. Although Gemma, Manni, O'Brien and Sambrell were all experienced veterans of the genre, for most of the cast this would be their first and only spaghetti Western appearance.

== Cast ==
- Giuliano Gemma as Roy Blood — a bounty hunter who wanders the Texas frontier following the murder of his father. He eventually arrives in Cerriotts, where he intends to take revenge on the land baron who is ultimately responsible for his death.
- Donald O'Brien as Fletcher — a murderous gunman who works for Barrett.
- Geoffrey Lewis as Two-Strike Snake — a colorful drifter who befriends Roy Blood and becomes his companion. He is often seen stealing the belongings of men who Blood has killed in gunfights.
- Gianni De Luigi as Turner — a blond-haired cowboy with uncertain intentions towards Blood. He initially offers Blood a murder contract, which the bounty hunter accepts when he learns the target is Barrett.
- Licinia Lentini as Shiba — Blood's ex-girlfriend and madam of the local whorehouse. She hires Blood to stop Garrincha from extorting her and later helps Blood in his feud with Thomas Barrett.
- Sven Valsecchi as Thomas Barrett, Jr. — the only son of Richard Barrett, the land baron who cheated Roy Blood's father years before. He and his sister Margaret are under the care of their uncle Thomas Barrett, Sr.
- Cinzia Monreale as Margaret Barrett — the older sister of Thomas Barrett, Jr. and niece of Thomas Barrett, Sr.
- Ettore Manni as Thomas Barrett, Sr. — a ruthless and manipulative land baron who uses Roy Blood's desire for vengeance to further his own plans.
- Aldo Sambrell as Garrincha — a Mexican bandit whose gang is extorting Shiba. He becomes an enemy of Roy Blood when the gunfighter kills several of his men who are threatening Shiba.
- Philippe Hersent as The Sheriff — the town sheriff, he is initially suspicious of Roy Blood and eventually believes he is in league with Garrincha. He is largely focused on breaking up Garrincha's gang and is unaware of Thomas Barrett's intentions.

== Plot ==
The film opens in a small South Texas border town in the 1850s. A poor farmer and his young son arrive into the settlement where the farmer confronts Luke, a thieving henchman employed by wealthy land baron Richard Barrett. The man complains to Luke that he had been cheated by Barrett, claiming he had been sold a deed to non-existent property. Luke finally shoots the farmer, killing the man in front of his young son. His son then picks up his father's shotgun, uses it to kill Luke, and rides out of town with Luke's horse and a distinctive silver-trimmed saddle.

The boy is next seen several years later and has since become a hardened bounty hunter calling himself Roy Blood (Giuliano Gemma). He meets an elderly drifter, Two-Strike Snake (Geoffrey Lewis), who accompanies him to the frontier town of Cerriotts. Snake is a colorful character who claims that the story of the "silver saddle" and the boy who avenged his father's death is well known and that he wishes to join Blood in his travels. On the way, Snake often scavenges the remains of those killed in gunfights by Roy Blood.

Their arrival in Cerriotts is noticed by several townspeople, in particular, a local cowboy known as Turner (Gianni De Luigi). Blood visits the town whorehouse where he meets with an old girlfriend, Shiba (Licinia Lentini), who is also its madam. She tells Blood that she is being extorted by a man called Shep, who collects the money on behalf of a Mexican bandit named Garrincha (Aldo Sambrell). Shiba enlists Blood's help in taking care of Garrincha and his gang. Indeed, Blood confronts and kills Shep and several of Garrincha's men in a gunfight. Afterwards, Turner appears to offer Blood $2,000 to kill a man called Barrett. Blood is hesitant to take the murder contract, but accepts the offer upon recognizing the name of the land baron who had swindled his father years before.

The murder is arraigned to take place in a graveyard outside town where Barrett is expected to arrive. Blood lies in wait until a carriage eventually pulls up. Its occupant is a young boy however, not the older land baron he had expected, who enters the graveyard carrying a funeral wreath. Blood then sees several men who ambush the child, but before they can kill him, Blood shoots the assassins and rides off with the boy. Blood learns the boy's name is Thomas Barrett, Jr. (Sven Valsecchi), the son of his intended victim Richard Barrett. The elder Barrett has been dead for several years and Thomas, Jr. has since been cared for by his uncle Thomas Barrett, Sr. (Ettore Manni). Angered at being cheated out of his revenge, Blood leaves the boy stranded in the hillside with only a knife and a blanket.

Back at the Barrett homestead, Thomas's older sister Margaret (Cinzia Monreale) is upset over her brother's disappearance. Thomas, Sr. discusses the search with Turner, who is revealed to be the ranch foreman, and is decided by the land baron that Roy Blood is the kidnapper and posts a $5,000 bounty. Meanwhile, Blood is rejoined by Snake, who offers him a deal. Snake reveals that he took in Thomas, Jr. after he left and intends to ransom the boy back to the Barrett family. Blood is also informed that the bounty was a ploy used to kill himself and the boy, with Blood being blamed for the murder.

Blood hides out at Shiba's whorehouse, and where Thomas, Jr. is looked after, while Shiba obtains information on the Barrett family. Using her feminine wiles, she is able to learn that after the death of Richard Barrett, his fortune was divided between his children and his brother. However, Thomas gambled away his half of the inheritance, while the family fortune was possessed by his children. The will provided that if Thomas, Jr. died, Margaret would inherit the entire fortune. It is presumed that is the motivating factor for Thomas Barrett, Sr. to marry his niece.

Thomas, Jr. is eventually spotted by Turner while visiting the whorehouse and Blood takes him to the San Jacinto monastery located several miles away. The gun-toting padre of the monastery promises to protect the boy while Blood goes after Turner. He eventually confronts Turner and his men at an abandoned farmhouse, where a shootout occurs and Blood kills Turner. But at the monastery, the bandit Garrincha and his gang have killed all the priests and taken Thomas, Jr., whom they plan to ransom for themselves. Blood is later arrested by the sheriff (Phillppe Hersent) who believes he is a member of Garrincha's band.

The bandit leader demands $10,000 for the safe return of the boy. Thomas, Sr., against the advice of the sheriff, agrees to pay the ransom and sends out a messenger named Fletcher (Donald O'Brien) to deliver the money to Garrincha's camp. The courier is murdered once he hands the money over to the bandits.

With the help of Margaret, Blood eventually escapes from the town jail and reunites with Snake to track down Garrincha. They finally find the bandit's hideout when Thomas, Jr. flies a kite over its location. Blood and Snake arrive to find Garrincha whipping the boy after discovering his ruse. A gun battle with Garrincha and his men results in the death of the bandit, but not before Snake is killed.

Blood returns to the Barrett ranch with Thomas, Jr. and exposes his uncle's role in the kidnapping, revealing that Thomas, Sr. had planned with Turner to kill his niece and nephew so that he would gain the family inheritance. Garrincha was also part of the plan, Thomas, Sr. staging a false kidnapping and ransom payment to avert suspicion from himself, and had intended to kill Turner as well as Margaret once he married her. Blood kills Thomas, Sr. with one of his ornamental pistols. The film's conclusion shows Blood riding out of town with Thomas, Jr. alongside him.

== Production ==
Lucio Fulci had directed two other spaghetti westerns, The Brute and the Beast (1966) and Four of the Apocalypse (1975), prior to Silver Saddle. With an original story written by screenwriter Adriano Bolzoni and financed by the Italian studio Rizzoli Film Productions, Fulci went to work on what would be his final spaghetti western. Fulci would later find fame as a horror film director, specifically his gore films Zombi 2 (1979) and The Beyond (1981).

Filming between Murder to the Tune of Seven Black Notes (1977) and Zombi 2 (1979), his crew included many Fulci regulars including cinematographer Sergio Salvati, editor Ornella Micheli and composer Fabio Frizzi. The film's screenwriter Adriano Bolzoni was also a top Italian writer, best known for his collaboration with Ernesto Gastaldi in Sergio Martino's Your Vice is a Locked Room and Only I Have the Key (1972).

=== Casting ===
Giuliano Gemma was given the lead role of Roy Blood. Gemma's breakout role had been in one of the earliest successful spaghetti westerns, A Pistol for Ringo (1965), and secured his role as a star in the genre. Several of his co-stars were also highly recognizable character actors. Donald O'Brien, best known for his roles in Run, Man, Run! (1966), Keoma (1976) and Mannaja (1977), had also appeared in Fulci's previous western Four Gunmen of the Apocalypse. O'Brien would later star in Fulci's dystopian film The New Gladiators (1984).

Ettore Manni had starred in Johnny Oro (1966) and both "official" and "unofficial" Sartana sequels I Am Sartana Your Angel of Death (1969) and Django and Sartana Are Coming... It's the End (1970). Aldo Sambrell, another early spaghetti Western star, had appeared in Gunfighters of Casa Grande (1964), A Fistful of Dollars (1964), For a Few Dollars More (1965), Navajo Joe (1966), A Bullet for the General (1966), The Hellbenders (1967), Once Upon a Time in the West (1968) and Duck, You Sucker! (1971). American character actor Geoffrey Lewis had previously appeared in Sergio Leone's My Name is Nobody (1973).

Sven Valsecchi was a well-known child actor at the time of his appearance in Silver Saddle. His first role had been in The Balloon Vendor (1974) and had recently appeared in Nenè (1977) when he was cast in the film. This was his final role in a feature film and, after a guest appearance in the 1979 television miniseries Orient Express, retired from acting altogether.

Cinzia Monreale had been in a few romantic comedies before her appearance in Silver Saddles although the director of her first film, Franco Rossetti, had written the screenplays for Johnny Oro (1965), Texas, Adios (1965) and Django (1966). Monreale would appear in several of Fulci's later horror films including The Beyond (1981), The New Gladiators (1984) and the television movie The Sweet House of Horrors (1989).

This was the first major film role for Licinia Lentini, appearing alongside fellow Italian sex symbol Agnes Kalpagos, and was cast in the female lead despite being relatively inexperienced. She had then been in only a few films, among these being the b-movie science fiction film War of the Robots (1976). Following her appearance in Silver Saddle, she had a number of supporting roles in comedy films herself. In her last film appearance, she starred in Django 2 (1986) which was the first spaghetti western to be made in over a decade since her appearance in Silver Saddle.

Philippe Hersent was a veteran actor with a career spanning forty years and had supporting roles in such films as La Garçonne (1936), The Giant of Marathon (1954), Scipio the African (1971) and Conversation Piece (1974). Hersent was also known for his roles in the James Bond parody film series Agent 077 (Agent 077 From the Orient with Fury and Agent 077: Mission Bloody Mary). This was his last film role and he died four years later.

=== Filming ===
Principal filming took place in Almería, Spain under the direction of longtime Fulci collaborator cinematographer Sergio Salvati throughout 1977 and into early 1978. This was one of the two last spaghetti westerns to be filmed in the area, the other being Monte Hellman's China 9, Liberty 37 which was released later that year.

== Reaction ==
The film proved moderately successful following its release in Italy on 20 April 1978, eventually earning 237,000,000 £ (US: 162,462) in its initial run. Silver Saddle was shown throughout Europe during the next two years, and was especially popular in West Germany, Austria and Hungary with a recorded attendance of 887,413 for the latter country. The film was generally rated "above 15", West Germany and Norway both classifying the film as (FSK 16) and (15 År) respectively, while in other countries such as Argentina the film was given an "above 13" rating.

It was never theatrically released in the US, although it was released on VHS shortly after its original theatrical run in Italy. The film's soundtrack, composed by Franco Bixio, Vince Tempera and Fabio Frizzi, came out that same year and featured "Two Hearts" by Ken Tobias which later became a popular tune. Despite the film being re-released on DVD in 2001 by Madusa Video, Silver Saddle remains one of Fulci's least known films. It has generally had mixed reviews by both fans and critics, being praised in Thomas Weisser's Spaghetti Westerns: The Good, The Bad, and The Violent (1992) and panned in Stephen Thrower's Beyond Terror: The Films of Lucio Fulci (2002).
