= Special Mission Lady Chaplin =

- Film poster
- Directed by: Alberto De Martino; Sergio Grieco
- Written by: Sandro Continenza; Marcello Coscia; Giovanni Simonelli; Hipólito de Diego
- Produced by: Edmondo Amati; Jacques Roitfeld
- Starring: Ken Clark; Daniela Bianchi
- Cinematography: Alejandro Ulloa
- Edited by: Otello Colangeli
- Music by: Bruno Nicolai
- Release dates: August 12, 1966 (Italy); June 18, 1967 (France)
- Countries: Italy; France; Spain
- Language: Italian

Special Mission Lady Chaplin (Italian: Missione speciale Lady Chaplin, French: L'affaire Lady Chaplin, Spanish: Operación Lady Chaplin, also known as Operation Lady Chaplin) is a 1966 Italian-French-Spanish Eurospy film directed by Alberto De Martino and Sergio Grieco. It is the third and last of the Secret Agent 077 film series starring Ken Clark as 077 and Daniela Bianchi as fashion expert and professional killer Lady Arabella Chaplin. Bianchi reprised her role as Arabella in Your Turn to Die (1967). The film was shot in New York City, London, Madrid, Rome, and Paris.

== Plot ==
CIA Secret Agent 077 Dick Malloy (Jack Clifton in the German release) is sent to Madrid when someone wishes to sell a dog tag apparently recovered from the sunken American nuclear submarine USS Thresher. Once the item is identified as a genuine article, the man selling the information is killed before he can reveal how he acquired the dog tag from the ocean floor. Malloy and his boss Heston interview the Howard Hughes type marine salvage multi-millionaire Zoltan in order to determine whether the wreck of the submarine could be accessed. Zoltan denies it is possible but Heston and Malloy do not believe Zoltan is telling the truth.

Using an advanced bathysphere, Malloy travels to the site of the remains of the Thresher and discovers that the 16 Polaris missiles with nuclear warheads carried by the submarine are missing.

== Cast ==
- Ken Clark as Dick Malloy
- Daniela Bianchi as Lady Arabella Chaplin
- Helga Liné as Hilde
- Jacques Bergerac as Kobre Zoltan
- Mabel Karr as Jacqueline
- Alfredo Mayo as Sir Hillary
- Philippe Hersent as Heston
- Ida Galli as Constance Day
- Tomás Blanco as Inspector Soler

== Release ==
Special Mission Lady Chaplin was released in Italy on August 12, 1966. It was released in France on June 18, 1967.
