= The Fuller Report =

- Directed by: Sergio Grieco
- Written by: Sandro Continenza; Roberto Gianviti; Alberto Silvestri; Franco Verucci
- Produced by: Edmondo Amati
- Starring: Ken Clark; Beba Loncar
- Cinematography: Stelvio Massi
- Music by: Armando Trovajoli
- Release date: 1968
- Language: Italian

The Fuller Report (Italian: Rapporto Fuller, base Stoccolma, French: Trahison à Stockholm) is a 1968 Italian-French Eurospy film directed by Sergio Grieco and starring Ken Clark and Beba Loncar. The theme song "Touch of Kiss" is performed by Lara Saint Paul.

== Plot ==
Dick Worth is a race car driver and becomes entangled in espionage.

== Cast ==
- Ken Clark as Dick Worth
- Beba Loncar as Svetlana Golyadkin
- Lincoln Tate as Pearson
- Jess Hahn as Eddy Bennet
- Paolo Gozlino as Max
- Serge Marquand as Bonjasky
- Mirko Ellis as Jimmy
- Claudio Biava as Bonjasky's Henchman
- Gianni Brezza as Clay
- Lars Passgård as Knut
- Max Turilli as The Doctor
