= Secret Agent 077 =

1960s spy film series

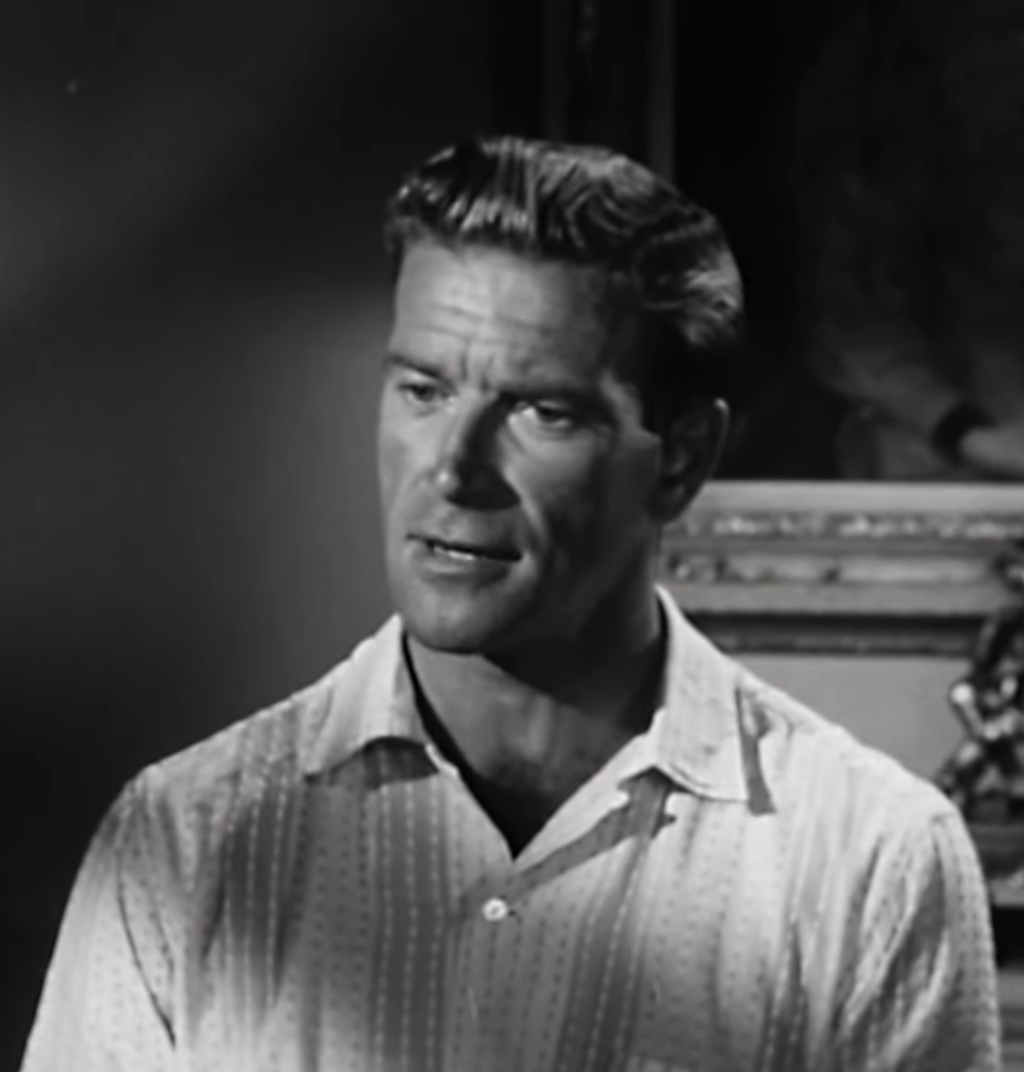
Ken Clark in Attack of the Giant Leeches (1959).

Secret Agent 077 is a fictional superspy, lead character in a trilogy of Eurospy films starring Ken Clark as Dick Malloy (or Maloy). However "077" was used on posters or advertising of several other Eurospy films with little or no relationship to each other perhaps to exploit the audience's knowledge of 007.

== Official entries ==
The first two were directed by Sergio Grieco under the pseudonym Terence Hathaway, the third directed by Alberto De Martino, with all starring Ken Clark. All were Italian/French and Spanish co-productions shot around the world in Technicolor and Techniscope:

- Agent 077: Mission Bloody Mary (1965)
- Agent 077: From the Orient with Fury (1965)
- Special Mission Lady Chaplin (1966) (directed by Alberto De Martino)

In 1967 the same production company produced The Tiffany Memorandum directed by Grieco but starring Clark as "Dick Hallam" a journalist drawn into the CIA.

== Other films ==
Brett Halsey played an Agent 077 with the name of George Farrell in Espionage in Lisbon (with story and music by Jesús Franco), whilst Luis Dávila played Agent S.077 with the name of "Marc Mato" or "Mike Murphy" in Espionage in Tangier as well as Ypotron in which his character, in some prints, is also called "Robert Logan". In 1964, Franco had actually preceded the “official” 077 franchise by directing the French-Spanish coproduction titled Agent 077 opération Jamaïque (or more rarely Agent 077 Opération Sexy) in France (and La muerte silba un Blues in Spain and Death Whistles a Blues in English), starring Conrado San Martín as Alfred Pereira (codenamed agent 077 in the French dub).

Richard Harrison's Bob Fleming in Secret Agent Fireball and Killers Are Challenged was titled Agent 077 in some countries.

A 1968 Indian film was titled Golden Eyes Secret Agent 077.
