= Argoman the Fantastic Superman =

1967 film directed by Sergio Grieco

- Theatrical release poster
- Italian: Come rubare la corona d'Inghilterra
- Directed by: Sergio Grieco
- Written by: Dino Verde; Vincenzo Flamini
- Starring: Roger Browne; Dominique Boschero; Eduardo Fajardo
- Cinematography: Tino Santoni
- Edited by: Renato Cinquini
- Music by: Piero Umiliani
- Production company: Fida Cinematografica
- Distributed by: Fida Cinematografica (Italy)
- Release date: March 1967 (Italy)
- Running time: 93 minutes
- Country: Italy

Argoman the Fantastic Superman (Italian: Come rubare la corona d'Inghilterra, lit. 'How to steal the crown of England', also released as The Incredible Paris Incident) is a 1967 Italian superhero Eurospy film directed by Sergio Grieco (credited as 'Terence Hathaway'), and starring Roger Browne, Dominique Boschero, and Eduardo Fajardo. It was released by Fida Cinematografica on March 24, 1967.

== Plot ==
In China, soldiers prepare to shoot Argoman, but he hypnotizes them, and they kill each other. Argoman then lands in the USSR where he gets his assignment. His employers thought the Chinese would kill him after he had accomplished his mission of destroying a nuclear weapon, then there would be no need to pay him. Argoman takes a jeweled box, following his tradition of taking souvenirs and other valuables in place of ordinary payment; he has an original Mona Lisa in his collection.

At the Tower, Scotland Yard Inspector Lawrence investigates the theft of the Royal Crown. Sir Reginald Hoover (Argoman) trains to hold his breath under water in a pool (his servant Chandra tells him the result is 33 minutes, 9 seconds). Afterwards, Sir Reginald invites one of his girlfriends for a rendezvous and picks Samantha, a young Englishwoman. Suddenly, he hears a hovercraft nearing the shore and uses his telekinetic powers to get it ashore. From the hovercraft emerges a woman who introduces herself as Regina. Sir Reginald invites her to spend time with him. However, Chandra is worried, because following intimacy, Argoman will lose his powers for six hours.

Lawrence comes to Sir Reginald and says the Crown was returned with a note from Jenabell, Queen of the World (Regina del Mondo or Queen Sullivan). She demands "Muradoff A IV". In the photographs of Tower visitors, Sir Reginald recognizes Regina. Sir Reginald goes to Paris to find the criminal. Inspector Lawrence arrives at the French Ministry of Technology and finds out that "Muradoff A IV" is a big gem with property of reflecting any sort of light and destroying molecular cohesion, rendering any material pliable. The police think Jenabell wants the gem for dividing and using on the international market to destroy currencies. Sir Reginald uses a ring with a Geiger counter to find Jenabell because she has smoked his special radioactive cigarettes. Jenabell and her men rob a bank; while loading money into the van, Sir Reginald hides among crates, and Argoman defeats the robbers.

An airborne Jenabell throws down French francs and threatens to use over ₣3 billion more unless she receives the gem. For her appointment with her police, she chooses Sir Reginald. Jenabell recognizes him, and her agents attempt to blow up the bus. Sir Reginald then blindfolded (though he has x-ray vision) and Jenabell brings him to her base. There, Argoman manages to escape and saves fellow hostage, Samantha. Meanwhile, Jenabell gets the gem and uses it to animate androids, clones of politicians. One of them, the minister, arrives to his office, where he had a confrontation with Argoman. The clone jumps out the window, and Argoman briefly catches him before it falls to its death. Police arrive as Argoman flees, immediately jumping to the conclusion that the hero is a killer.

Sir Reginald visits Ambassador La Bouche's reception, where he identifies the clones via his ring with the Geiger counter. Samantha marks them with glowing lipstick, and Argoman kills the clones. Jenabell kidnaps an American General, Headwood, one of the chiefs of nuclear forces; others she has already cloned. Sir Reginald departs to her base on a train, but Jenabell's agent sabotages it. Nevertheless, Argoman arrives in time to save General Headwood from cloning. Superhero destroys Jenabell's and other clones. The real Jenabell flees with "Muradoff A IV" on a plane. Argoman telekinetically turns the plane to the sun, and the gem reflects its light, killing Jenabell in an explosion. As a souvenir for this case, Argoman takes the Royal Crown.

== Cast ==
- Roger Browne as Sir Reginald Hoover/Argoman
- Dominique Boschero as Regina Sullivan/Jenabell
- Eduardo Fajardo as Shandra
- Nadia Marlowa as Samantha
- Mimmo Palmara as Kurt
- Nino Dal Fabbro as Inspector Lawrence
- Edoardo Toniolo as Inspector Martini
- Andrea Bosic as Admiral Durand
- Tom Felleghy as General Haywood
- Alberto Plebani as Minister of the Interior
- Dario De Grassi as Sgt. Johnson
- Fulvio Mingozzi as Security Man

== Production ==
The film was shot on location in London and Paris, while the interior scenes were shot at Cinecittà.

== Release ==
Argoman the Fantastic Superman was released in Italy in March 1967. The film has also been released under the titles Argoman superdiabolico, The Fantastic Argoman and The Incredible Paris Incident. It has been released on DVD in the United States by the Dorado Films label.

== Reception ==
The cast and crew of the film had differing views of the production, with Executive producer Edmondo Amati stating that "the idea was to make an Italian Superman of sorts, but we did not have the means or the technique" while actress Dominique Boschero was happy with the results of the film, stating that it was "something new, a film ahead of its time. Sergio Grieco was a rather good director and we had a higher budget than usual, and more locations as well."

From retrospective reviews, film critic Marco Giusti described the film as "super-camp", yet "very funny and very effective on its visual side". Roberto Curti referred to the film as one that "perfectly captures the spirit of 1960s Italian superheroes" by retaining the fumetti neri's "delightful amorality while squeezing the best from the many Italian James Bond rip-offs in terms of tongue-in-cheek fast-paced action." Curti proclaimed it "one of the funniest Italian superhero films of that period." Film critic Howard Hughes found that the film "never quite fulfills the promise of its surreal opening sequence" and that Argoman was "a somewhat patch superhero, it seems appropriate that the less-than-fantastic Argoman's symbol is a turd-like red spiral on his forehead."

== See also ==
- List of Italian films of 1967
