= La peccatrice dell'isola =

1952 film by Sergio Corbucci

La Peccatrice dell'isola
- Directed by: Sergio Corbucci; Sergio Grieco
- Written by: Nino Stresa; Adriano Bolzoni; Sergio Corbucci
- Cinematography: Bitto Albertini
- Edited by: Giuseppe Vari
- Music by: Carlo Innocenzi
- Distributed by: Variety Distribution
- Release date: 1952
- Country: Italy
- Language: Italian

La Peccatrice dell'isola (The Island's Sinner) is a 1952 Italian melodrama film directed by Sergio Corbucci (in his directorial debut) and Sergio Grieco and starring Silvana Pampanini.

== Cast ==
- Silvana Pampanini: Carla
- Folco Lulli: Don Pietro Ingarsia
- Vittorio Duse: Ispettore De Santis
- John Kitzmiller: Pescatore
- Maria Grazia Francia: Maria
- Mirella Uberti: Carmela
- Mario Vitale: Francesco
- Gianni Glori: Rosario
