= Maryse Guy Mitsouko =

French actress

- Born: 1943
- Died: March 1995 (aged 52); Paris, France
- Occupation: Actress

Maryse Guy Mitsouko (born Maryse Guy; 1943 – March 1995) was a French artist and actress. She was mostly billed as Mitsouko.

== Career ==
She made her debut in Douce Violence in 1962. Mitsouko is most known for playing a minor Bond girl Madame La Porte in Thunderball (where her voice was dubbed by Catherine Clemence) as well as appearing in several other Eurospy films such as Agent 077 - Mission Bloody Mary.

== Filmography ==
Year	Title	Role	Notes
1962	Sweet Ecstasy		
1963	Règlements de compte		
1963	Les Femmes d'abord	Wanda, la nouvelle collaboratrice	
1963	Nick Carter va tout casser	L'assistante de Li-Hang	
1964	The Gorillas		
1965	Agent 077 - Mission Bloody Mary	Kuan	
1965	Code Name: Jaguar	Woman in green dress at the hotel reception	Uncredited
1965	Thunderball	Madame LaPorte	Uncredited
1966	Killers Are Challenged	Moira	
1966	Z7 Operation Rembrandt	Seyna	
1966	Furia a Marrakech	Chinese Secret Agent	(final film role)
