= Tiffany Memorandum =

- Directed by: Sergio Grieco
- Written by: Sandro Continenza; Roberto Gianviti
- Produced by: Edmondo Amati
- Starring: Ken Clark; Irina Demick
- Cinematography: Stelvio Massi
- Music by: Riz Ortolani
- Release date: 1967
- Language: Italian

Tiffany Memorandum (also known as The Tiffany Memorandum) is a 1967 Eurospy film directed by Sergio Grieco. It is an international co-production between Italy, France (where the film is known as Coup de force à Berlin) and West Germany (where it was released as Komm Gorilla, schlag zu!). The film is set in Berlin.

== Cast ==
- Ken Clark: Dick Hallam
- Irina Demick: Sylvie Meynard
- Luigi Vannucchi: Inspector Brook
- Loredana Nusciak: Madame Tiffany
- Grégoire Aslan: The Shadow
- Jacques Berthier: Colonel Callaghan
- Carlo Hintermann: Shadow's Agent
- Michel Bardinet: Francisco Aguirre
- Angelo Infanti: Pablo Almereyda / Max Schultz
- Solvi Stubing: Hotel Maid
- Giampiero Albertini: Callaghan's Agent / Doctor
