= Philippe Hersent =

French actor

- Born: 26 July 1912; Écommoy, France
- Died: 30 December 1982 (aged 70); Rome, Italy
- Occupation: Actor
- Years active: 1930-1978
- Spouse: Simone Mareuil (married 1940-1951)

Philippe Hersent (26 July 1912 – 30 December 1982) was a French actor. He appeared in more than eighty films from 1930 to 1978.

== Filmography ==
Year	Title	Role	Notes
1930	L'enfant de l'amour		
1931	End of the World		
1933	Rocambole		
1934	Les bleus de la marine	L'aspirant	
1935	Golgotha	Jacques	
1935	Le secret de l'émeraude	Walter	
1935	Joli monde	Philippe	
1936	Mayerling	Petit rôle	Uncredited
1936	La Garçonne	Peer Rys	
1936	La Porte du large		
1936	The King	Sernin de Chamarande	
1937	Grey's Thirteenth Investigation	Bernard Dartmore	
1938	Une de la cavalerie	de Mareuil	
1938	Un meurtre a été commis	Claude Lorrain	
1939	Fort Dolorès	Marco Lopez	
1940	Après Mein Kampf mes crimes		
1946	Night Warning	Stefan Hess	
1946	La troisième dalle	Gérard	
1946	Destiny		
1947	The Fugitive	Pole	
1947	La dernière chevauchée	Claude Carrion	
1948	The Tragic Dolmen	Bartoli	
1949	L'homme aux mains d'argile	Marken	
1950	Nous avons tous fait la même chose		
1950	The Dancer of Marrakesh		
1951	The Billionaire Tramp	Le commissaire de quartier	
1951	Mammy	Un acolyte de Maurice	
1953	La môme vert-de-gris	Le commissaire	
1953	Children of Love	Inspecteur Gaultier	
1954	Opération tonnerre		
1955	The White Angel	Mario La Torre	
1956	The Violent Patriot	frate Salvatore	
1956	La rivale	Colonnello Dondi	
1956	The House of Intrigue	Mark Landers	
1956	Ciao, pais...	Serg. Sergio Blanc	
1957	Solo Dio mi fermerà		
1957	The Mighty Crusaders	Goffredo di Buglione	
1957	The Dragon's Blood	Danwarth	
1957	La trovatella di Pompei	Mariano	
1958	The Sword and the Cross	Ponzio Pilato	
1959	Ritrovarsi all'alba	Ing. Montini	
1959	Marie of the Isles	Baillardel	
1959	I mafiosi	Don Calogero Virzi	
1959	The Giant of Marathon	Callimaco	
1960	Les mordus	Lane	
1960	Goliath and the Dragon	Androclo	
1960	The Huns	Katermai	
1961	Guns of the Black Witch	Jean's Stepfather	
1962	Attack of the Normans	James	
1962	79 A.D.	Titus Flavius	
1962	The Old Testament	Namele	
1964	Rome Against Rome	Azer	
1964	Coriolanus: Hero without a Country	Consul Cominio	
1964	Zorikan lo sterminatore		
1964	Hero of Rome	Publicola	
1964	Messalina vs. the Son of Hercules	Claudius	
1964	Giants of Rome	Drusus	
1964	Three Swords for Rome		
1965	Agent 077: Mission Bloody Mary	Heston - CIA Chief	
1965	Agent 077: From the Orient with Fury	Heston - CIA Chief	
1966	The Murder Clinic	Marc de Brantome	
1966	Special Mission Lady Chaplin	Heston	
1966	Cifrato speciale	Richard	
1968	Un colpo da mille miliardi	Gottlieb	
1968	Hell in Normandy	Prof. Aubernet	
1968	Carogne si nasce	Deputy Norton 'Mezzobraccio' Carradine	
1969	Tiempos de Chicago	Big John	
1970	Tulips of Haarlem		
1970	Cerca di capirmi		
1971	Tre nel mille		
1971	Four Gunmen of the Holy Trinity	Marshal Thomas	
1971	Scipio the African	console Marcello	
1971	The Beasts	Placido	(segment "Il cincillà)
1972	So Sweet, So Dead	The Questor	
1972	The Infamous Column	Guglielmo Migliavacca	
1973	The Great Kidnapping	Riccardi	
1974	The Beast	Owner of CISA Car Company	
1974	Conversation Piece	Portiere	
1975	A Second Spring	Giuseppe	
1976	The Innocent		
1976	A.A.A. cercasi spia... disposta spiare per conto spie	Samos	
1976	A Matter of Time	Cook	
1976	Voir Malte et mourir		
1977	La bella e la bestia	The Prince	(segment "Zooerastia")
1978	Silver Saddle	Sheriff	(final film role)
