= Primo premio: Mariarosa =

- Directed by: Sergio Grieco
- Written by: Michele Pescatore; Carlo Veo
- Starring: Carlo Croccolo
- Cinematography: Renato Del Frate
- Release date: 1952
- Running time: 91 minutes
- Country: Italy
- Language: Italian

Primo premio: Mariarosa, also known as Primo premio: Maria Rosa, is a 1952 Italian comedy film directed by Sergio Grieco and starring Carlo Croccolo.

== Plot ==
The film is one of a series of light comedies directed by Grieco at a period in his career when he could not make serious films. Mariarosa, a cow, is the prize in an annual raffle held by a village in Abruzzo. One year the winner is a visitor who works in a government ministry in Rome, Virgilio (Croccolo), and he decides to keep the cow. Eventually he is persuaded to honour custom and return her to be raffled off again the following year; in the process he finds love.

== Cast ==
- Carlo Croccolo
- Isa Barzizza
- Carlo Campanini
- Fulvia Franco
- Mirella Uberti
- Galeazzo Benti
- Leopoldo Valentini
- Carlo Romano
- Luigi Bonos
