= Your Turn to Die =

- Directed by: Michele Lupo
- Written by: Sandro Continenza; Ernesto Gastaldi; Paolo Levi; Fabio Carpi
- Produced by: Edmondo Amati
- Starring: Claudio Brook; Daniela Bianchi
- Cinematography: Franco Villa; Stelvio Massi
- Music by: Francesco De Masi
- Release date: 1967
- Countries: Italy, France
- Language: Italian

Your Turn to Die (Italian: Troppo per vivere... poco per morire, French: Qui êtes-vous inspecteur Chandler?) is a 1967 Italian-French crime-thriller movie directed by Michele Lupo.

== Plot ==
A gang of criminals, in agreement with a model, set their eyes on some jewelry presented during a fashion show and worn by beautiful models. The diamonds, collected with patience by some associations of collectors, belonged to women of high society and some of them date back to the age of French absolutism. When one of the robbers tries to get away with the loot, his fellow conspirators shoot him in the back. The robber, Gordon, manages to give a clue to newspaper reporter Robert Foster, who sets off to retrieve the diamonds. Despite becoming a target for the rest of the gang, Foster prefers to rely on fashion model Arabella and newspaper photographer Flash instead of the more seasoned Inspector Chandler.

== Cast ==
- Claudio Brook as Robert
- Daniela Bianchi as Arabella
- Sidney Chaplin as Inspector Chandler
- Jess Hahn as Boris
- Yves Vincent as Felton
- Stefania Careddu as Katja
- Paolo Gozlino as Gordon
- Harriet White as Assistant Doctor
- Nazzareno Zamperla as Flash
- Anthony Dawson as Dr. Evans
- Jacques Herlin as Actor at recital
- Andrea Bosic as The Diplomat
- Tina Aumont as Dolly
- Raymond Bussières as Train conductor
- George Wang as Chang
- John Karlsen
- Guido Lollobrigida
