= Son of the Circus =

- Directed by: Sergio Grieco
- Written by: Fabio De Agostini; Sergio Grieco; André Tabet
- Starring: Ramuncho; Antonella Lualdi; Mario Feliciani
- Cinematography: Angelo Lotti
- Edited by: Enzo Alfonzi
- Music by: Felice Montagnini
- Production companies: Capitole Films; Compagnia Cinematografica Mondiale
- Distributed by: Produzioni Europee Associate; Pathé
- Release date: 27 December 1963
- Running time: 94 minutes
- Countries: France; Italy
- Language: Italian

Son of the Circus (French: L'enfant du cirque, Italian: Il figlio del circo) is a 1963 French-Italian musical comedy film directed by Sergio Grieco and starring Ramuncho, Antonella Lualdi and Mario Feliciani.

The film's sets were designed by the art director Antonio Visone.

== Cast ==
- Ramuncho as Rocco Antares
- Antonella Lualdi as Jenny Nardelli
- Mario Feliciani as Ministero Pubblico
- Pierre Mondy as Philip Nardelli
- Rik Battaglia as Steffi
- Gina Rovere as Adua Senoner
- Ubaldo Lay as Avv. Adami
- Renzo Palmer as Paper, il pianista
- Susan Terry
- Vittorio Sanipoli as Gillo Antares
- Giuseppe Addobbati
- Goffredo Unger
- Mirko Ellis as Marcos
- Sergio Ammirata as Giornalista

== Bibliography ==
- Jean A. Gili & Aldo Tassone. Parigi-Roma: 50 anni di coproduzioni italo-francesi (1945-1995). Editrice Il castoro, 1995.
