= Code Name: Jaguar =

- Original French film poster
- Directed by: Maurice Labro
- Screenplay by: Claude Rank (novel and screenplay); Maurice Labro; Jean Meckert; Louis Velle
- Based on: Corrida pour un espion by Claude Rank
- Produced by: Miguel de Echarri; Hans Oppenheimer
- Starring: Ray Danton; Pascale Petit; Roger Hanin
- Cinematography: Roger Fellous
- Edited by: Georges Arnstam
- Music by: Michel Legrand
- Production companies: Hans Oppenheimer Film; Midega Film; Transatlantic Production
- Distributed by: Gaumont; Constantin Films
- Release date: 13 August 1965 (W. Germany)
- Running time: 107 minutes
- Countries: France; West Germany; Spain

Code Name: Jaguar (French: Corrida pour un espion, Spanish: Persecución a un espía, German: Der Spion, der in die Hölle ging, also known as The Spy Who Went Into Hell, is a 1965 French/Spanish/West German international co-production Eurospy film directed by Maurice Labro in his penultimate feature film. The film was co-written by French author Claude Rank (pen name of Gaston-Claude Petitjean-Darville, born November 22, 1925, died 2004) based on Rank's 1964 novel of the same name. The film stars Ray Danton, Pascale Petit and Roger Hanin and was shot in Alicante with interior studio work filmed in West Berlin.

== Plot ==
Prior to his discovery and death, an American intelligence officer working undercover at a Soviet Naval base sends proof of the Russians filming American submarines off a joint US-Spanish naval base in San Juan, on the coast of Spain. American intelligence "Super Agent" Jeff Larson (Ray Danton) is sent to San Juan to investigate where he meets up with his former colleague Bob Stuart (Roger Hanin), and his Spanish contact, Pilar Perez (Pascale Petit). Larson (code name "Jaguar"), helps the American military discover remote controlled video cameras being used by the Soviets. These cameras are boobytrapped using sophisticated landmines, killing two Spanish sailors who tried to disarm one. Larson skin dives to clandestinely board a Soviet spy ship to discover that not only are they monitoring American submarines, but they are intercepting radio transmissions from the US-Spanish naval base as well as having a mole on the base. Larson successfully disarms a landmine protecting another video camera, saves the camera for analysis and hatches a plan to convert the landmine into a limpet mine and "return [it] to sender." Throughout the escapade Larson survives several assassination attempts.

== Cast ==
- Ray Danton ... Jeff Larson
- Pascale Petit ... Pilar Perez
- Roger Hanin ... Bob Stuart
- Conrado San Martín ... Comdr Luis Moreno
- Manuel Gil ... Clark
- Horst Frank ... Karl
- Charles Régnier ... Simon Walter
- Wolfgang Preiss ... Captain Parker
- Carl Lange ... Vassili Golochenko
- Helga Sommerfeld ... Lina Calderon
- Grit Boettcher ... Saskia
- Helga Lehner ... Chambermaid
- Günter Meisner ... Russian officer on the Donetz
- Maryse Guy Mitsouko ... Woman at hotel reception in green dress

== Soundtrack ==
- A Lot of Livin' to Do

Music by Charles Strouse
Lyrics by Lee Adams
Sung by Ray Danton
