= Il sentiero dell'odio =

- Directed by: Sergio Grieco
- Written by: Sergio Grieco; Gianmaria Majorana; Michele Pescatore; Carlo Veo
- Cinematography: Carlo Carlini
- Release date: 1950
- Country: Italy
- Language: Italian

Il sentiero dell'odio (translation: The Pathway of Hate) is a 1950 Italian melodrama film directed by Sergio Grieco in his directoral debut.

== Cast ==
- Marina Berti
- Andrea Checchi
- Carla Del Poggio
- Vittorio Duse
- Checco Rissone
- Alessandro Fersen
- Piero Lulli
- Renato Malavasi
- Ermanno Randi
