= Neffs, Ohio =

- Census-designated place
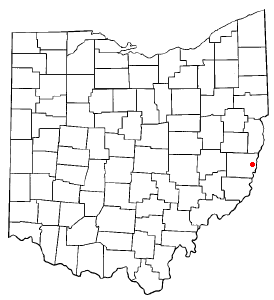
- Location of Neffs, Ohio

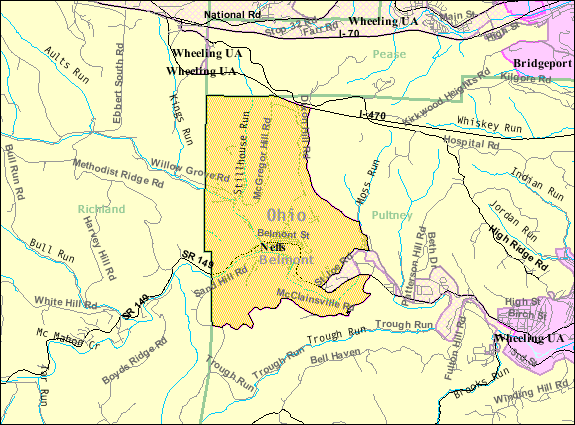
- Detailed map of Neffs
- Coordinates: 40°01′55″N 80°49′02″W
- Country: United States
- State: Ohio
- County: Belmont

Area
  - Total: 4.02 sq mi (10.42 km^{2})
  - Land: 3.98 sq mi (10.32 km^{2})
  - Water: 0.039 sq mi (0.10 km^{2})
- Elevation: 1,099 ft (335 m)

Population (2020)
  - Total: 878
  - Density: 220.3/sq mi (85.06/km^{2})
- Time zone: UTC-5 (Eastern (EST))
  - Summer (DST): UTC-4 (EDT)
- ZIP code: 43940
- Area code: 740
- FIPS code: 39-53788
- GNIS feature ID: 2393145

Neffs is an unincorporated community and census-designated place in northwestern Pultney Township, Belmont County, Ohio, United States. The population was 878 at the 2020 census. It is part of the Wheeling metropolitan area.

== History ==
A post office called Neffs has been in operation since 1892. Besides the post office, Neffs had a sawmill and gristmill. The local Neffs (or Neife) family came to Belmont County from Switzerland via Pennsylvania and Maryland.

On March 16, 1940, at approximately 11:00am EST, an explosion at Hanna Coal Company's No. 10 Mine at Willow Grove occurred, killing 72 men.

Neffs was also the birthplace of model and actor Ken Clark.

== Geography ==
Neffs is located in eastern Belmont County in the northwest part of Pultney Township. The center of the community lies in the valley of McMahon Creek, a tributary of the Ohio River. Ohio State Route 149 passes through Neffs, leading east 5 miles (8 km) to Bellaire on the Ohio. Downtown Wheeling, West Virginia, is an additional five miles to the north from Bellaire.

According to the United States Census Bureau, the Neffs CDP has a total area of 4.0 square miles (10.4 km^{2}), of which 0.04 square miles (0.1 km^{2}), or 0.93%, is water.

== Demographics ==
Historical population
Census	Pop.	Note	%±
2000	1,138		—
2010	993		−12.7%
2020	878		−11.6%
U.S. Decennial Census

As of the census of 2000, there were 1,138 people, 449 households, and 339 families residing in the CDP. The population density was 283.8 inhabitants per square mile (109.6/km^{2}). There were 483 housing units at an average density of 120.4 per square mile (46.5/km^{2}). The racial makeup of the community was 99.03% White, 0.35% African American, and 0.62% from two or more races. Hispanic or Latino of any race were 0.18% of the population.

There were 449 households, out of which 29.0% had children under the age of 18 living with them, 58.1% were married couples living together, 10.2% had a female householder with no husband present, and 24.3% were non-families. 21.4% of all households were made up of individuals, and 10.7% had someone living alone who was 65 years of age or older. The average household size was 2.53 and the average family size was 2.93.

In the CDP the population was spread out, with 21.8% under the age of 18, 7.7% from 18 to 24, 28.3% from 25 to 44, 26.5% from 45 to 64, and 15.6% who were 65 years of age or older. The median age was 40 years. For every 100 females there were 98.6 males. For every 100 females age 18 and over, there were 94.3 males.

The median income for a household in the CDP was $25,000, and the median income for a family was $36,875. Males had a median income of $31,875 versus $19,926 for females. The per capita income for the community was $13,557. About 7.7% of families and 13.8% of the population were below the poverty line, including 22.6% of those under age 18 and 6.9% of those age 65 or over.
