= Two Mafiosi Against Goldginger =

- Original film poster
- Directed by: Giorgio Simonelli
- Written by: Sandro Continenza; Dino Verde; Amedeo Sollazzo
- Story by: Marcello Ciorciolini
- Produced by: Edmondo Amati
- Starring: Franco Franchi; Ciccio Ingrassia; Fernando Rey; Gloria Paul
- Edited by: Franco Fraticelli
- Music by: Piero Umiliani
- Production companies: Fida Cinematografica; Época Films S.A.
- Distributed by: La Fida Cinematografica Distribuzione
- Release date: 15 October 1965
- Running time: 89 minutes
- Countries: Italy; Spain
- Language: Italian

Two Mafiosi Against Goldginger or Due mafiosi contro Goldginger is a 1965 Eurospy comedy film directed by Giorgio Simonelli starring the comic duo Franco and Ciccio. It is a spoof of the 1964 James Bond film, Goldfinger. It was picked up by American International Pictures and dubbed into English to be shown on their AIP-TV movie package as The Amazing Dr. G or Two Crazy Secret Agents.

== Plot ==
After the British agent James Bond is killed, the cruel entrepreneur Goldginger plans to conquer the world using surrogate robots to be included in the various embassies policies in the world. In Sicily, two photographers, bungling Franco and Ciccio, who discovered Goldginger's plan, are captured by him because they possess secret information picked up by James Bond before he died.

Immediately, the comedy and the rift with the world of 007 become apparent to the viewer. In fact, while James Bond had his licence to kill, when the two Sicilian friends are captured, Ciccio presents himself: "Pleasure: I'm Ciccio Pecora. Primary school!" (Piacere: sono Ciccio Pecora. Licenza elementare!). Goldginger, as in the famous scene from the original film, tries to divide Franco and Ciccio into two with the laser beam, but the two try to dissuade him from his idea. In fact, for example, they say that dividing the two of them becomes four pieces and then for the burial Goldginger will have to spend a lot more money for the flowers and coffins. Ciccio had to leave to Goldginger the secret of James Bond, is released together with Franco and so, after a while, the two friends manage to escape with the help of Marlene. Disguised as African shamans and after gaining experience in the army, Franco and Ciccio are ready to face new Goldginger in his secret lair: a factory of ginger soda soft drinks.

== Cast ==
- Franco Franchi as Franco Pecora
- Ciccio Ingrassia as Ciccio Pecora
- Gloria Paul as Marlene
- Fernando Rey as Goldginger / Dr. G / Dr. Goldginger
- Andrea Bosic as Colonel Herrman
- Rosalba Neri as The Secretary (as Sara Bay)
- Dakar as Molok
- George Hilton as Agent 007
- Giampiero Littera as Dupont
- Barbara Nelli as Miss Dupont
- John Karlsen as White
- Mario Pennisi as Instructor
- Les Bluebell Girls as Dancing group
- Luis Peña
- Alfredo Mayo

== Reception ==
A retrospective Italian review states that Franco and Ciccio are here taking benefit of a somehow less fragmentary staging than those of the films they usually appear in. The same review also praises Fernando Rey's performance, recalling how the stark Buñuelian actor manages to portray interesting characters even in pure entertainment films.
