= Ubaldo Lay =

Italian actor and voice actor

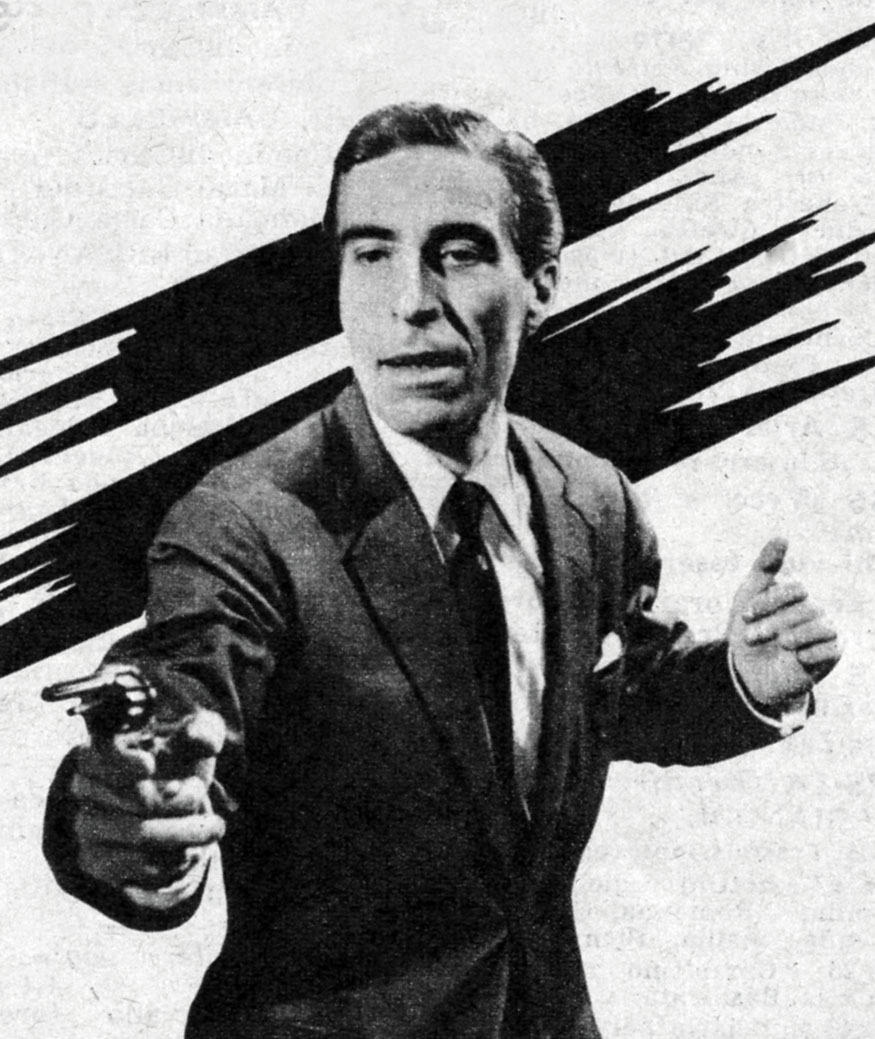
- Born: Ubaldo Bussa; 14 April 1917; Rome
- Died: 27 September 1984 (aged 67); Rome
- Occupation: Actor

Ubaldo Lay (14 April 1917 – 27 September 1984) was an Italian actor and voice actor.

== Life and career ==
Born in Rome as Ubaldo Bussa, after graduating in law, Lay was admitted to the Academy of Dramatic Arts in 1939, from which he graduated with honors. He debuted on stage in 1945 and on films in 1946. Active on radio, in 1951 Lay moved to New York City where he hosted several radio programs for Italo-Americans audiences. Back in Italy, he resumed his radio and stage activities and debuted in television in 1956.

Lay's breakout role was Lieutenant Sheridan, that he played in five RAI crime series and in several television films. He also starred in several other successful television series, often directed by Anton Giulio Majano, while his cinema activity was less significant, consisting mainly of supporting roles. Lay died of a cerebral hemorrhage aged 67.

== Partial filmography ==
- Monte Cassino (1946) - Don Eusebio
- Hey Boy (1948) - Don Pietro (voice, uncredited)
- Toto the Sheik (1950) - Il maggiore della legione
- The Merry Widower (1950) - Shaphiro
- Solo per te Lucia (1952)
- I tre corsari (1952) - Il carceriere Alvaro
- Guilt Is Not Mine (1952) - Andrea
- Jolanda, the Daughter of the Black Corsair (1953)
- Captain Phantom (1953) - (uncredited)
- A Day in Court (1954) - Il fidanzato di Anna
- Naples Is Always Naples (1954) - Il tunisino
- Toto in Hell (1955) - Belfagor
- Chéri-Bibi (1955) - Conte Ponte-Marie
- The Violent Patriot (1956) - Stefano, padre di Anna
- Il canto dell'emigrante (1956) - Capo banditi
- Terrore sulla città (1957)
- The Pirate and the Slave Girl (1959) - Tripolino
- Chiamate 22–22 tenente Sheridan (1960) - Tenente Ezzy Sheridan
- Gerarchi si muore (1961) - Giuseppe, the butler
- Son of the Circus (1963) - Avv. Adami
- Provaci anche tu, Lionel (1973) - Sheridan
- The Exorcist: Italian Style (1975) - Lt. Sheridan (final film role)
