= The Violent Patriot =

- Directed by: Sergio Grieco
- Written by: Ottavio Poggi; Sergio Grieco
- Cinematography: Alvaro Mancori
- Music by: Roberto Nicolosi
- Release date: 1956
- Country: Italy
- Language: Italian

The Violent Patriot (Italian: Giovanni dalle Bande Nere) is a 1956 Italian adventure film directed by Sergio Grieco. It is loosely based on real life events of the Italian condottiero Giovanni dalle Bande Nere.

== Cast ==
- Vittorio Gassman as Giovanni dalle Bande Nere
- Constance Smith as Lady Emma
- Anna Maria Ferrero: Anna
- Gérard Landry as Gasparo
- Silvio Bagolini as Lumaca, the hunchback servant
- Ubaldo Lay as Stefano, Anna's father
- Philippe Hersent as Friar Salvatore
- Andrea Aureli as Count de Lautrec

== See also ==
- Condottieri (1937)
- The Profession of Arms (2001)
