= Loredana Nusciak =

Italian actress and model

- Nusciak in Django (1966)
- Born: Loredana Cappelletti; 3 May 1942; Trieste, Kingdom of Italy
- Died: 12 July 2006 (aged 64); Trieste, Italy
- Occupations: Actress; model
- Spouse: Gianni Medici (until 2006)

Loredana Nusciak (born Loredana Cappelletti; 3 May 1942 – 12 July 2006) was an Italian actress and model.

== Biography ==
Born in Trieste, she won the beauty contest "Miss Trieste" in 1959, while still a high school student. After making her film debut in A Difficult Life (1961), Nusciak achieved some popularity in the sixties thanks to her roles in a number of genre films, including L'uomo che viene da Canyon City (1965) and Django (1966); starting from seventies, she thinned out her acting activity, appearing in just four more films. She was also very active in fotonovelas. She was also March in the 1963 Lambretta catalogue.

== Death ==
Nusciak died of an incurable disease in her hometown of Trieste in 2006.

== Partial filmography ==
- Colossus and the Amazon Queen (1960) – Amazzone
- Sanremo – La grande sfida (1960)
- Totòtruffa 62 (1961) – College Girl
- A Difficult Life (1961) – Giovanna, Elena's friend
- Smog (1962)
- Gladiators 7 (1962) – Aglaia
- I motorizzati (1962) – Paola
- The Fall of Rome (1963) – Svetla
- La banda Casaroli (1963)
- Siamo tutti pomicioni (1963) – Lucienne (segment "Le gioie della vita")
- Les Baisers (1964) – Gina (episode 4 "Baiser de 16 ans")
- Seven from Thebes (1964) – Cirene
- Här kommer bärsärkarna (1965) – Veronica
- The Dreamer (1965) – Donata
- Man from Canyon City (1965) – Viviane Barrett
- Z7 Operation Rembrandt (1966) – Paula
- Seven Dollars on the Red (1966) – Emily
- Django (1966) – Maria
- Superargo contro Diabolikus (1966) – Diabolikus' Girlfriend
- Ten Thousand Dollars for a Massacre (1967) – Mijanou
- Tiffany Memorandum (1967) – The Shadow's Agent
- Revenge for Revenge (1968) – Clara / Ann Bower
- Dio perdoni la mia pistola (1969) – Gladys Clanton
- Something Creeping in The Dark (1971) – Model for Photo of Lady Sheila Marlowe
- Tony Arzenta (1973) – Gesmundo's Lover
- Silent Action (1975) – Mrs. Martinetti (uncredited)
- Folle à tuer (1975) – Marcella Mostri
- Ancora una volta... a Venezia (1975) – Franca
