= Emma Danieli =

Italian actress and television personality

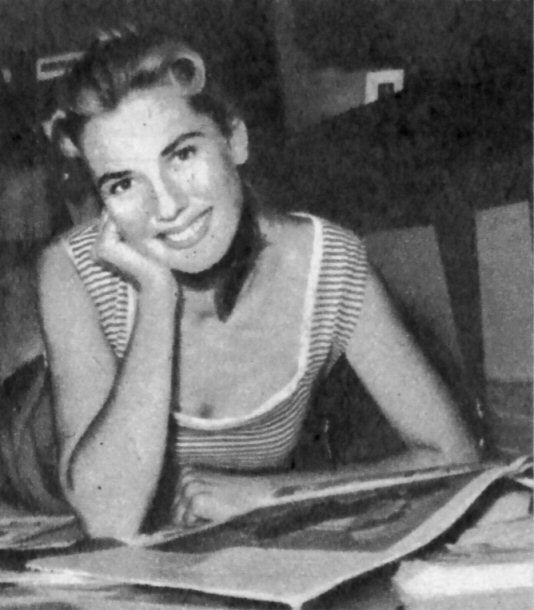
- Danieli in 1956
- Born: Emma Fretta; 14 October 1936; Curtatone, Mantua, Kingdom of Italy
- Died: 21 June 1998 (aged 61); Lugano, Switzerland
- Occupation: Actress

Emma Danieli (born Emma Fretta; 14 October 1936 – 21 June 1998) was an Italian actress and television personality.

== Life and career ==
Born in Curtatone, Mantua, Danieli started her career at very young age as an actress of commercials. After winning a beauty contest, she made her film debut in 1953, in the anthology film Siamo donne. While her film career ended after a little more than a decade, Danieli was better appreciated on television, where she was one of the first announcers as well as a TV presenter and an actress in television films and series. She was also active on stage. Danieli was married to director Franco Morabito.

== Selected filmography ==
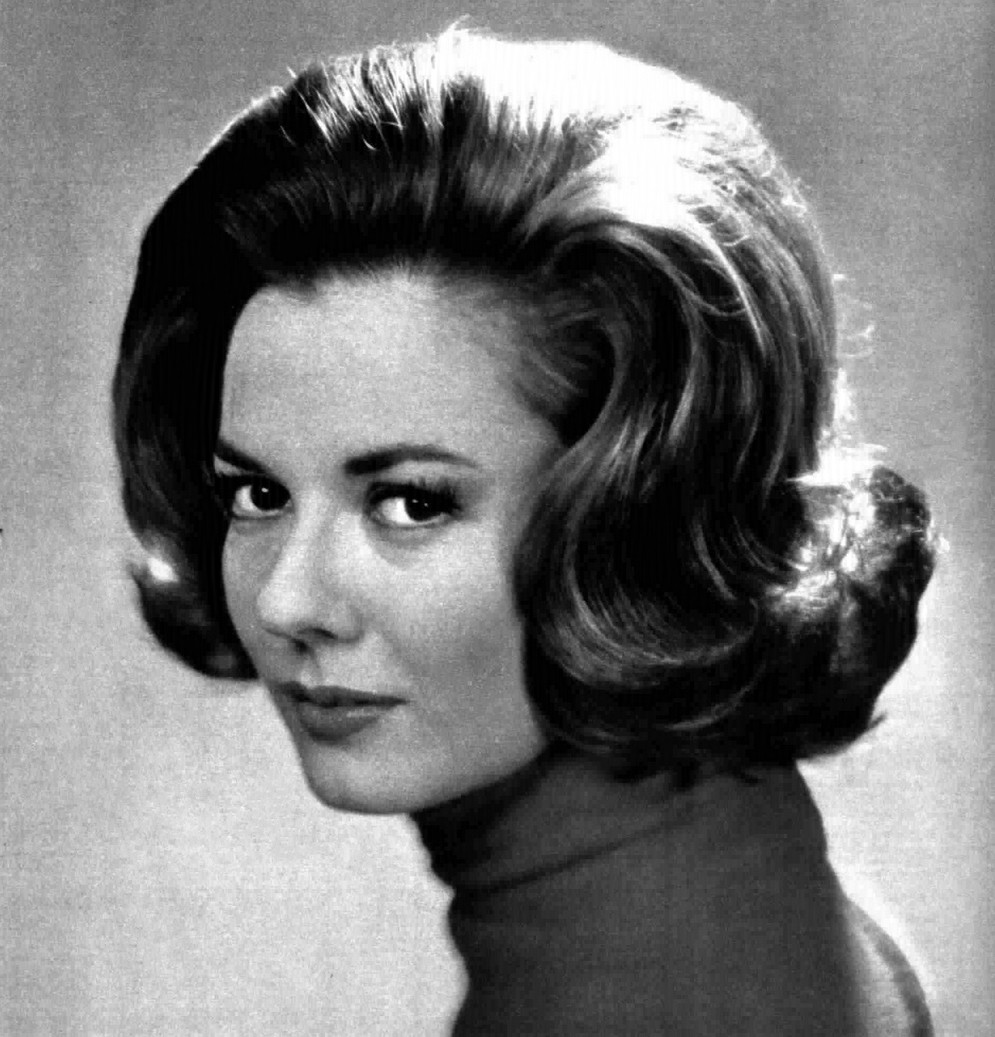
Danieli in 1962

- We, the Women (1953)
- Doctor Antonio (1954)
- Devil's Cavaliers (1959)
- The Corsican Brothers (1961)
- Guns of the Black Witch (1961)
- The Last Man on Earth (1964)
- Slalom (1965)
- God's Thunder (1965)
- The Spy Who Loved Flowers (1966)
- Spies Strike Silently (1966)
- Commissariato di notturna (1974)
