= Z7 Operation Rembrandt =

1966 film

- Directed by: Giancarlo Romitelli
- Written by: Giancarlo Romitelli; Ennio De Concini; José Luis Dibildos; Robert Weller
- Produced by: Aldo Piga
- Starring: Lang Jeffries
- Cinematography: Guglielmo Mancori
- Music by: Aldo Piga
- Release dates: 16 March 1966 (Italy); 24 June 1966 (West Germany); 28 June 1971 (Spain)
- Countries: Italy; Spain; West Germany
- Language: Italian

Z7 Operation Rembrandt (German: Rembrandt 7 antwortet nicht..., Italian: Mark Donen - Agente Zeta 7, Spanish: Z-7, operación Rembrandt) is a 1966 German-Italian-Spanish Eurospy film written and directed by Giancarlo Romitelli and starring Lang Jeffries. It was shot in Macau, Tangier, Rome, Málaga, and Torremolinos.

== Cast ==
- Lang Jeffries as Agent Z-7 Mark Donen
- Joachim Hansen as Pierre
- Christiane Maybach as Consuela
- Laura Valenzuela as Irene Walter
- Carlo Hintermann as Kosky
- Loredana Nusciak as Paula
- Mitsouko as Seyna
- Luis Peña as da Silva
- Lorenzo Robledo as Colonel
- Giuseppe Mattei as Juan
- Luciano Catenacci as Seyna's Accomplice
- Miguel del Castillo as Diego Oropessa
- Álvaro de Luna as Kosky's Henchman
- Mónica Randall as Claudine
