= Ken Clark (actor) =

American actor (1927–2009)

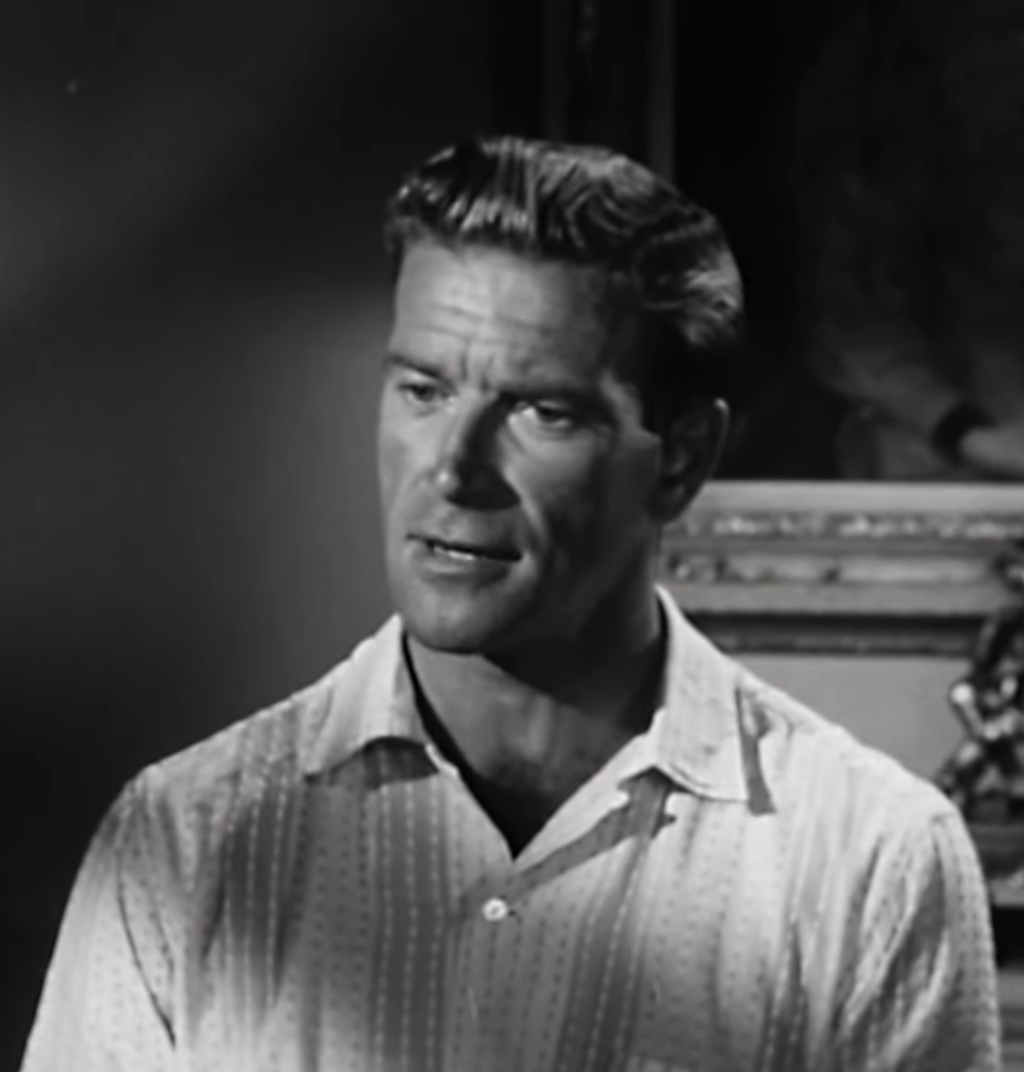
- Clark in Attack of the Giant Leeches (1959)
- Born: Kenneth Donovan Clark; June 4, 1927; Neffs, Ohio, U.S.
- Died: June 1, 2009 (aged 81); Rome, Italy
- Education: Pasadena Playhouse
- Occupation: Actor
- Years active: 1955–1998
- Spouse(s): Bette Blatt (m. 19??; div. 1980)
- Children: 5, 1 step-daughter

Kenneth Donovan Clark (June 4, 1927 – June 1, 2009) was an American actor. He was best known as a leading man in Italian B movies, including the Secret Agent 077 trilogy and a number of Spaghetti Westerns.

== Early life ==
Clark was born in Neffs, Ohio. He enlisted in the Navy when he was 17, and after being honorably discharged, he sought a career as an actor. When that effort was unsuccessful, he found employment as a model and as a construction worker. He also worked as a coal miner in the mid 1950s near Cadiz.

After moving to Los Angeles, he studied acting at the Pasadena Playhouse.

== Career ==
=== Early career ===
Clark was originally contracted to 20th Century Fox. While working for that studio, he acquired a reputation as a "beefcake" actor similar to Richard Egan. He appeared in a variety of genres of film, including crime (Six Bridges to Cross), Western (The Last Wagon), and war film (Between Heaven and Hell). Additionally, in one of his final roles for Fox, he appeared in Elvis Presley's debut motion picture, Love Me Tender. Fox dropped Clark following that picture, and his roles in the following years were often in lower-budget films.

Clark's most prominent role in American film came in 1958, when he was cast as Stewpot in South Pacific, an adaptation of the Broadway musical. His singing vocals were dubbed by Thurl Ravenscroft. Following the film's premiere, the New York Times described Clark's character as a "raffish gob."

During this period, Clark made many guest star appearances on a variety of American TV shows, including four appearances on Alfred Hitchcock Presents. In 1958 he appeared on Death Valley Days S6 E15 "Yankee Pirate" as the pirate Joseph Chapman. In 1959, he made an unsold private investigator TV pilot for a William Campbell Gault-inspired mystery series entitled Brock Callahan, directed by Don Siegel and written by Stirling Silliphant. That same year, he made a guest appearance in an episode of Western TV series Colt .45. During this period Clark had the lead in Attack of the Giant Leeches (1959) and 12 to the Moon (1960). The former is regarded by some as Clark's "most memorable film."

=== 1960s: Agent 077 ===
During the 1960s and 1970s, like many other American actors Clark went to Italy appearing in several sword and sandal films, Spaghetti Westerns and Eurospy films, including the Hercules film The Son of Hercules in the Land of Darkness, starring fellow American actor Dan Vadis, in 1963.

In 1965, Clark originated the role of Secret Agent Dick Mallory in the Agent 077 trilogy modeled on James Bond. In one of the pictures from that trilogy, From the East with Fury, Mallory seeks to rescue a kidnapped nuclear scientist.

=== 1970s: Westerns ===
In 1971, Clark appeared alongside James Garner in A Man Called Sledge.

== Personal life ==
Clark was married to Bette Lola (Kruger) Blatt, a widow with a young daughter. They went on to have five children together and separated when he left for Europe to continue his acting career. Bette died in 1980.

=== Death ===
According to fellow actor Robert Woods, Clark died of a heart attack in Rome, Italy on June 1, 2009, three days before his 82nd birthday, shortly after a taping for a program on the mid-1960s Eurospy genre on the TV series Starcult.

== Partial filmography ==
Adapted from IMDb and TV Guide.

- 1956 On the Threshold of Space Sergeant Ike Forbes
- 1956 The Proud Ones as Pike
- 1956 The Last Wagon as Sergeant
- 1956 Between Heaven and Hell as Morgan
- 1956 Love Me Tender as Mr. Kelso
- 1957 Alfred Hitchcock Presents (Season 2 Episode 39: "The Dangerous People") as "Policeman"
- 1957 The True Story of Jesse James as Sergeant (uncredited)
- 1958 Alfred Hitchcock Presents (Season 3 Episode 17: "The Motive") as Plain Clothes Policeman
- 1958 Alfred Hitchcock Presents (Season 3 Episode 28: "Lamb to the Slaughter") as Mike the Policeman Assistant
- 1958 South Pacific as Stewpot
- 1959 The Shaggy Dog as FBI Agent (uncredited)
- 1959 Attack of the Giant Leeches as Steve Benton
- 1960 Alfred Hitchcock Presents (Season 5 Episode 30: "Insomnia") as Fireman
- 1960 Heller in Pink Tights as Soldier Warning the Travelers (uncredited)
- 1960 12 to the Moon as Captain John Anderson
- 1961 Re Manfredi / King Manfred as Astolfo
- 1963 Hercules Against the Mongols as Sayan
- 1963 Jacob and Esau as Esau
- 1964 None But the Lonely Spy as Robert Liston
- 1964 Hercules the Invincible as Kabol
- 1964 FX 18 Secret Agent as Francis Coplan
- 1964 Hercules Against the Barbarians as Kubilai
- 1964 The Road to Fort Alamo as Bud Massidy
- 1965 Agent 077: Mission Bloody Mary as Dick Malloy
- 1965 Agent 077: From the Orient with Fury as Dick Malloy
- 1966 Ringo del Nebraska / Savage Gringo / Gunman Called Nebraska as Nebraska
- 1966 Special Mission Lady Chaplin as Dick Malloy
- 1967 Tiffany Memorandum as Dick Hallam
- 1967 Desert Commandos as Captain Fritz Schoeller
- 1968 The Fuller Report as Dick Worth
- 1969 Tarzana, the Wild Girl as Glen Shipper
- 1970 A Man Called Sledge as Floyd
- 1981 Teste di quoio as Colonnello Stern
- 1985 Twice in a Lifetime as Flower Man
- 1989 Arena as Marcus Diablo
