= Gladiators 7 =

- Directed by: Pedro Lazaga
- Screenplay by: Sandro Continenza; Bruno Corbucci; Alberto De Martino; Giovanni Grimaldi
- Story by: Alberto De Martino; Italo Zingarelli
- Produced by: Anacleto Fontini; Italo Zingarelli
- Starring: Richard Harrison; Loredana Nusciak; Livio Lorenzon; Gérard Tichy
- Cinematography: Bitto Albertini; Eloy Mella
- Edited by: Otello Colangeli
- Distributed by: Metro Goldwyn Mayer
- Release dates: 11 October 1962 (Italy); 7 May 1964 (United States)
- Running time: 105 minutes
- Countries: Spain; Italy

Gladiators 7 is a 1962 film directed by Pedro Lazaga. The film has several elements from Akira Kurosawa's film The Seven Samurai.

== Plot ==
A Greek gladiator seeks revenge for the murder of his father and finds his lover captured by an evil tyrant.

== Cast ==
- Richard Harrison as Darius
- Loredana Nusciak as Aglaia
- Livio Lorenzon as Panurgus
- Gérard Tichy as Hiarba
- Edoardo Toniolo as Milon
- José Marco as Xeno
- Barta Barri as Flaccus
- Nazzareno Zamperla as Vargas (credited as Tony Zamperla)
- Franca Badeschi as Licia
- Enrique Ávila as Livius
- Antonio Molino Rojo as Macrobius
- Antonio Rubio as Mados
- Emilia Wolkowicz as Ismere

== Production ==
The film was partially shot on some of the locations where El Cid was filmed. Parts of the film were shot in Spain.

== Release ==
Gladiators 7 was released theatrically in Italy on 11 October 1962 with a 105 minute running time and in the United States on 6 May 1964 with a 92 minute running time.

== Reception ==
In contemporary reviews, "Tube." of Variety found the film to have a cliche screenplay with "stiff acting" and "mechanical dubbing". "Tube." noted that among the action sequences, the best involved a bout between a bull and a bare-handed gladiator but that the film was "erratic in tempo and dramatically heavyhanded [sic]." A review in the Monthly Film Bulletin stated that "the customary ingredients of colour, passion, and swordplay, here lavishly applied, add up to a lighthearted and lusty swashbuckling film."
