= Spies Strike Silently =

- Directed by: Mario Caiano
- Written by: Mario Caiano; Guido Malatesta
- Starring: Lang Jeffries; Emma Danieli
- Cinematography: Julio Ortas
- Music by: Francesco De Masi
- Release date: 1966

Spies Strike Silently (Italian: Le spie uccidono in silenzio, Spanish: Los espías matan en silencio, also known as Spies Kill Silently) is a 1966 Spanish-Italian Eurospy film written and directed by Mario Caiano and starring Lang Jeffries.

== Cast ==
- Lang Jeffries as Michael Drum
- Emma Danieli as Grace Holt
- Andrea Bosic as Rachid
- Erika Blanc as Pamela Kohler
- José Bódalo as Inspector Craig
- Mario Lanfranchi as Lt. Fouad
- José Marco as Harry Brook
- Enzo Consoli as Edward
- Umberto Ceriani as Prof. Freeman
- Jesús Tordesillas as Prof. Roland Bergson
- María Badmajew as Jane Freeman
- Gaetano Quartararo as Killer
