= Password: Kill Agent Gordon =

- Directed by: Sergio Grieco
- Written by: Lucio Battistrada; Gian Paolo Callegari; Ramón Comas
- Starring: Roger Browne; Helga Liné
- Cinematography: Juan Julio Baena
- Music by: Piero Umiliani
- Release date: 1966

Password: Kill Agent Gordon (Italian: Password: Uccidete agente Gordon, Spanish: Operación Mogador) is a 1966 Spanish-Italian Eurospy film directed by Sergio Grieco and starring Roger Browne.

== Cast ==
- Roger Browne as Doug Gordon
- Helga Liné as Karin
- Miguel de la Riva as Rudy Schwartz
- Franco Ressel as Albert Kowalski / Kastiadis
- Rosalba Neri as Amalia
- Andrea Scotti as Walter
- Silvana Jachino as Aisha
- Mila Stanic as Magda
- Enzo Andronico as Monsieur Lapipi
