= Thunder of Battle =

- Directed by: Giorgio Ferroni
- Screenplay by: Remigio Del Grosso
- Produced by: Diego Alchimede
- Starring: Gordon Scott; Alberto Lupo; Lilla Brignone; Philippe Hersent
- Cinematography: Augusto Tiezzi
- Edited by: Antonietta Zita
- Music by: Carlo Rustichelli
- Production companies: Doria Film; Explorer '58; Comptoir Francais du Film
- Distributed by: Variety Distribution
- Release date: 5 March 1964 (Italy)
- Running time: 96 minutes
- Countries: Italy; France

Thunder of Battle (Italian: Coriolano, eroe senza patria) is a 1964 Italian historical drama film set in Rome in 493 BC. The plot is an adaptation of the Roman legend about the general Gaius Marcius Coriolanus who won great victories for the Romans over their enemies the Volscians, but was then forced into exile by his political enemies at home.

== Cast ==
- Gordon Scott as "Coriolanus"
- Alberto Lupo as "Escinius"
- Lilla Brignone as "Volumnia"
- Philippe Hersent as "Cominius"
- Rosalba Neri as "Virginia"
- Aldo Bufi Landi as "Marco"
- Nerio Bernardi as "Menenius Agrippa"
- Piero Pastore
- Tullio Altamura
- Nello Pazzafini

== Release ==
Thunder of Battle was released in Italy with a 96-minute running time on March 5, 1964. The film re-uses footage from The Trojan Horse.

== See also ==
- List of historical drama films
- List of films set in ancient Rome

== Footnotes ==
=== References ===
- Hughes, Howard (2011). Cinema Italiano - The Complete Guide From Classics To Cult. London - New York: I.B.Tauris. ISBN 978-1-84885-608-0.
- Kinnard, Roy; Crnkovich, Tony (2017). Italian Sword and Sandal Films, 1908-1990. McFarland. ISBN 978-1476662916.
