= Our Man in Casablanca =

- Directed by: Tulio Demicheli
- Written by: Tulio Demicheli; Juan Gallardo Muñoz; Fulvio Gicca Palli
- Starring: Lang Jeffries
- Cinematography: Angelo Lotti
- Music by: Giovanni Fusco
- Release date: 1966

Our Man in Casablanca (Spanish: Nuestro agente en Casablanca, Italian: Il nostro agente a Casablanca, also known as The Killer Lacks a Name) is a 1966 Spanish-Italian Eurospy film written and directed by Tulio Demicheli and starring Lang Jeffries.

== Cast ==
- Lang Jeffries as Brian Kervin
- Olga Omar as Nadia Nalis
- Thea Fleming as Ingrid van Heufen
- Barbara Nelli as Zara Abbas
- Pier Paolo Capponi as Hermann von Heufen
- Rubén Rojo as Shannon
- Paco Morán as Draco
- José María Caffarel as Ali Ahmed
- Sara Guasch as Azina Nalis
