= The Murder Clinic =

- Italian theatrical release poster
- Directed by: Lionello De Felice; Elio Scardamaglia
- Screenplay by: Ernesto Gastaldi; Luciano Martino
- Story by: Ernesto Gastaldi; Luciano Martino
- Produced by: Elio Scardamaglia; Francesco Scardamaglia; Luciano Martino
- Starring: William Berger; Françoise Prévost; Mary Young; Barbara Wilson
- Cinematography: Marcello Masciocchi
- Edited by: Alberto Gallitti
- Music by: Francesco De Masi
- Production companies: Leone Film; Ci.Ti. Cinematografica; Orphée Productions
- Distributed by: Regional (Italy)
- Release date: 17 March 1966 (Italy)
- Running time: 90 minutes
- Countries: Italy; France
- Language: Italian
- Box office: ₤96 million

The Murder Clinic (Italian: La lama nel corpo, lit. 'The Knife in the Body') is a 1966 giallo film directed by Lionello De Felice and Elio Scardamaglia. It was produced by Elio Scardamaglia, Francesco Scardamaglia and Luciano Martino. The screenplay was written by Martino and Ernesto Gastaldi from their own story. It stars William Berger, Françoise Prévost, Harriet White Medin, Mary Young, and Barbara Wilson.

== Plot ==
In 1870s England, Dr. Vance (William Berger), the director of a mental hospital, is secretly carrying out skin grafts on the patients in an attempt to restore his sister-in-law's mutilated face (she accidentally fell into a lime pit). Meanwhile, a hooded killer is murdering people with a straight razor in the hospital.

== Cast ==
- William Berger as Dr. Vance
- Françoise Prévost as Gisèle de Brantome
- Mary Young as Lizabeth Vance
- Barbara Wilson as Mary
- Germano Longo as Ivan
- Philippe Hersent as Marc de Brantome, Gisèle's coachman
- Harriet White (credited as Harriet Medin) as Sheena
- Massimo Righi as Fred
- Anna Maria Polani as Jane
- Delfi Mauro as Laura

== Production ==
The film was shot in Villa Parisi in Rome. Although most sources indicate producer Elio Scardamaglia was also the director of the film, screenwriter Ernesto Gastaldi stated that De Felice was actually the film's director. Gastaldi stated that De Felice left the production near the end of shooting, with only a few scenes remaining left for Scardamaglia to direct himself. It was shot by Marcello Masciocchi and edited by Alberto Gallitti. The music was composed by Francesco De Masi.

== Style ==
Roberto Curti, author of Italian Gothic Horror Films, 1957-1969, described The Murder Clinic as an example of the way Italian gothic horror films evolved into the giallo genre in the 1970s.

== Release ==
Murder Clinic was released in Italy on 17 March 1966, distributed by Regional, at a length of 90 minutes. The film grossed a total of £96 million Italian lira on its theatrical release. In 1971, a re-release poster alluded to Berger's own trouble with the law for drug possession: the re-release print came with the tag line "William Berger, guilty or innocent?" It was released in France as Les nuits de l'epouvante (lit. 'Nights of Terror').

The film was released in the United States first as The Murder Clinic, and then years later, in an attempt to promote the film as a zombie movie, as Revenge of the Living Dead.

The film was released on DVD by Code Red DVD as part of the Six-Pack Volume Two box set.

== Reception ==
Stuart Byron of Variety, in a contemporary review of an 86-minute English-dubbed version of the film, described it as being typical of Italy's "continual supply of Gothic horror mysteries". He found the film "not up to some of the pix of Riccardo Freda or Mario Bava" but "noting its strength in its photography and visual look but that "the direction and scripting itself in on an inevitably elementary level, and the few attempts at "horror" via closups of Delphi Maurin's acid-disfigured face come off crudely."

In a retrospective review, Curti described the films direction as being "nondescript" and that the many red herrings in the film were unconvincing. Curti also noted, "The film only comes alive when Françoise Prévost is on screen". In his book Italian Horror Film Directors, Louis Paul described the film as a "handsomely crafted gothic thriller".

== See also ==
- List of French films of 1966
- List of Italian films of 1966
- List of horror films of 1966
