= The Spy with Ten Faces =

1966 film

- Directed by: Alberto De Martino
- Screenplay by: Alberto De Martino
- Produced by: Luggi Waldleitner; Emo Bistolfi
- Starring: Paul Hubschmid; Karin Dor; Vivi Bach; Nando Gazzolo
- Cinematography: Mario Fioretti
- Edited by: Elisabeth Kleinert-Neumann
- Music by: Bruno Nicolai
- Production companies: European; Roxy Film GmbH & Co. KG
- Release date: 22 April 1966 (West Germany)
- Running time: 103 minutes
- Countries: West Germany; Italy

The Spy with Ten Faces (Italian: Upperseven, l'uomo da uccidere, lit. 'UpperSeven, the Man to Kill', German: Der Mann mit den tausend Masken, lit. 'The Man of a Thousand Masks') is a 1966 Italian-West German Eurospy film written and directed by Alberto De Martino.

== Plot ==
Paul Finney aka Upperseven; played by Paul Hubschmitt, is a master of disguise by the use of masks. His task is to secure a transport of credit money for the union of some African states. An international gang manages to steal this money and wants to use it to build a missile base. Part of the film takes place in Rome.

== Cast ==
- Paul Hubschmid as Paul Finney, the Upperseven
- Karin Dor as CIA agent Helen Farheit
- Vivi Bach as Birgit
- Nando Gazzolo as Kobras
- Rosalba Neri as Pauline
- Guido Lollobrigida as Santos
- Tom Felleghy as Gibbons
- Tullio Altamura as Bank director

== Release ==
The Spy with Ten Faces was released in West Germany on April 22, 1966.
