= Savage Gringo =

1966 film

- Italian film poster by Rodolfo Gasparri
- Screenplay by: Jesus Navarro Carrion; Antonio Román; Adriano Bolzoni
- Story by: Jesus Navarro Carrion; Antonio Román
- Produced by: Fulvio Lucisano
- Starring: Ken Clark; Yvonne Bastien; Piero Lulli
- Cinematography: Guglielmo Mancori
- Edited by: Renato Cinquini; Antonio Jimeno
- Music by: Nino Oliviero
- Production companies: Italian International Film; Castia Cooperativa Cinematografica
- Distributed by: Sidis
- Release dates: 18 March 1966 (Italy); 12 February 1968 (Spain)
- Running time: 91 minutes
- Countries: Italy; Spain

Savage Gringo (Italian: Ringo del Nebraska) is a 1966 Western film starring Ken Clark. The film is about a drifter who protects a rancher couple from a ruthless landowner. Under its Italian title, Savage Gringo was one of numerous Spaghetti Westerns retitled to take advantage of the success of Duccio Tessari's successful Ringo duology (A Pistol for Ringo and The Return of Ringo).

Stories from people involved with the production have discussed whether or not Mario Bava directed the film. Actor Renato Rossini stated he did not recall Bava ever being on set. Bava's son Lamberto, who served as an assistant director on the film, recalled that his father was brought in only to create matte paintings for the film. Bava's biographer Tim Lucas has debated the matter based on these recollections, while film historian Troy Howarth went so far as to state that Bava directed 99% of the film and edited it as well.

== Cast ==
- Ken Clark as Ringo / Nebraska
- Yvonne Bastien as Kay Hillmann
- Peter Carter as Bill Carter
- Red Ross as Lou Felton
- Alfonso Rojas as Marthy Hillmann
- Anthony Gradwell as Brack, the Bartender
- Paco Sanz as Dottor Parson
- Charles Lawrence as Sheriff Bert
- Renato Terra
- Angel Ortiz as Hanck Dewey
- José Canalejas as Elmer Dowson
- Frank Brana as Dickson
- Simón Arriaga as Tedder
- Alfonso de la Vega as Hollander
- Guillermo Méndez as Manuel

== Production ==
=== Background ===
Following the financial success of A Fistful of Dollars in Italy, several scripts that had been written to capitalize on the popularity of Westerns made by Karl May, but had initially been shelved, were put into production. These films, which featured characters like Django, Ringo and Sartana, would form the Italian Western. With the success of Duccio Tessari's Ringo films in 1965 (A Pistol for Ringo and The Return of Ringo), a wave of films with the name "Ringo" in the title were released, with nearly 30 made between 1965 and 1972, such as 100.000 dollari per Ringo and Ringo and His Golden Pistol. These films rarely had anything to do with the original two films, and were so named to take advantage of their popularity. Savage Gringo was among these films, as its original Italian title was Ringo del Nebraska; the protagonist's name was changed from "Nebraska" to "Ringo" through post-production dubbing.

=== Directorial credit dispute ===
The film was originally set to be directed by Antonio Román under the title of Nebraska il pistolero, but after a few days of shooting in La Pedriza in Spain, producer Fulvio Lucisano felt the director "wasn't working out" and halted production. On returning to Rome, Lucisano met with Mario Bava (with whom he had made Bava's most recent film, Planet of the Vampires), who agreed to finish the film, leading to it being completed at Elios Film Studios in Rome. The onscreen credits still include the originally-contracted cast and crew, although Lucisano stated that Bava directed most of the film.

In an interview with the Italian magazine Nocturno, actor Renato Rossini stated "I know this film very well, but I really can't remember Mario Bava involved in it. The director was a Spaniard, Antonio Román, a rather old man, a tall one. [...] We shot it almost entirely in Spain. I was on the set from the first day to the last day, but I really can't remember Mario Bava there." Bava biographer Tim Lucas has suggested that Rossini only had a small role in the film, which would not have required him to be on-set every day.

Mario Bava's son Lamberto Bava was an assistant director on the film, and recalled that Lucisano called his father to do some work on the film, such as matte paintings. Lamberto also noted that he and his father often laughed between themselves at Román's directorial style, as he would always use the first take of each scene. Lamberto Bava's recollections of Román's working methods would have resulted in Lucisano getting Bava to direct. Lucas also notes that Lamberto Bava would not have served as an assistant director if the film had been entirely shot in Spain.

In his study of Spaghetti Westerns, filmmaker Alex Cox considers Anthony Román to be the film's primary director and that Bava served as its second unit director. Film historian Troy Howarth declared that Bava directed about 99% of the film and supervised the editing process as well after the producer fired Antonio Roman.

== Release ==
Savage Gringo was first released in Rome on March 18, 1966. On its initial Italian release, the film grossed 143 million Italian lire. It was released in Germany as Nebraska Jim on June 12, 1966, and in Spain as El Rancho Maldito (transl. The Ranch of the Dead) on February 12, 1968. In 1970, the film was later reissued in Italy with a new title, Preparati a morire Ringo del Nebraska c'e Sartana (transl. Prepare to Die, Ringo From Nebraska - I Am Sartana). In the United States, the film was packaged for broadcast syndication on television by AIP-TV under the title Savage Gringo.
