= Operation Counterspy =

- Directed by: Nick Nostro
- Written by: Alfonso Balcázar; Nick Nostro; Giovanni Simonelli
- Starring: George Ardisson; Hélène Chanel
- Cinematography: Franco Delli Colli
- Music by: Franco Pisano
- Release date: 1965
- Language: Italian

Operation Counterspy (Italian: Asso di picche - Operazione controspionaggio, Spanish: As de pic, operación Contraespionaje, French: As de pic) is a 1965 Italian-Spanish-French Eurospy film written and directed by Nick Nostro and starring George Ardisson. It was shot in Istanbul. A sequel film was initially planned, but the plans were abandoned due to schedule conflicts of the main actor George Ardisson.

== Cast ==
- George Ardisson as Lord George Moriston
- Hélène Chanel as Pat
- Lena von Martens as Alina
- Joaquín Díaz as Oakes
- Corinne Fontaine as Claudie
- Umberto Raho as Von Bliss
- Emilio Messina as Franco
- Ricardo Rodríguez as Gussiè
- Tom Felleghy
- Thea Fleming
