= Agent 077: From the Orient with Fury =

1965 film directed by Sergio Grieco

Agente 077 dall'oriente con furore
- Film poster
- Directed by: Sergio Grieco
- Written by: Sandro Continenza
- Produced by: Edmondo Amati, Benito Perojo, Jacques Roitfeld
- Starring: Ken Clark
- Cinematography: Juan Julio Baena
- Edited by: Enzo Alfonzi
- Music by: Piero Piccioni
- Release date: September 24, 1965 (Italy)
- Running time: 94 minutes
- Countries: Italy; Spain; France
- Language: Italian

Agent 077 From the Orient With Fury or Agent 077 Fury in the Orient or Agente 077 dall'oriente con furore or Fury on the Bosphorus is a 1965 Italian/Spanish/French international co-production action spy adventure film and the second of the Secret Agent 077 film series directed by Sergio Grieco.

A Eurospy film, inspired by the James Bond series, it involves a scientist who has invented a disintegrator gun capable of mass destruction being kidnapped by a criminal gang for lethal usage.

== Cast ==
- Ken Clark - Agent 077 Dick Malloy (Jack Cliffton in the German version)
- Margaret Lee as Evelyn Stone
- Evi Marandi as Romy Kurtz, Prof. Kurtz' daughter
- Fabienne Dali as Simone Degas
- Philippe Hersent as Heston - Europachef CIA
- Mikaela as Dolores Lopez (as Michaela)
- Fernando Sancho as Restaurant guest
- Loris Bazzocchi (as Loris Barton)
- Ennio Balbo as Professor Kurtz
- Claudio Ruffini as Goldwyn's blond puncher
- Franco Ressel as Goldwyn (as Frank Ressel)
- Tomás Blanco as Auctioneer
- Pasquale Basile (as Pat Basil)
- Lorenzo Robledo as Mike (as Norman Preston)
- Gianni Medici (as John Hamilton)
- Jean Yonnel (as Jean Lyonel)
