= Alberto De Martino =

Italian film director

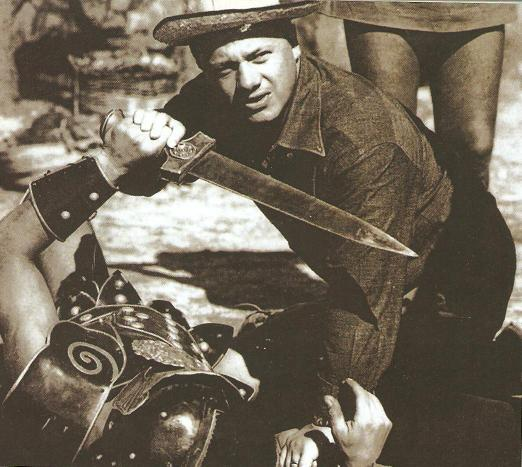
- Alberto de Martino on the set of one of his peplums
- Born: 12 June 1929; Rome, Italy
- Died: 2 June 2015 (aged 85); Rome, Italy
- Other name: Martin Herbert
- Occupations: Film director, screenwriter
- Years active: 1959–1985

Alberto De Martino (12 June 1929 – 2 June 2015) was an Italian film director and screenwriter. Born in Rome, De Martino started as a child actor and later returned to the cinema where he worked as a screenwriter, director and dubbing supervisor. De Martino's films as a director specialised in well-crafted knock-offs of Hollywood hit films. These films were specifically created films in Western, horror and mythology genres which were developed for the international market. The Telegraph stated that his best known of these film was probably The Antichrist. The Antichrist capitalized on the box-office appeal of The Exorcist (1973) and in its first week in the United States earned a greater box office than Jaws.

== Life and career ==
Alberto De Martino was born on 12 June 1929 in Rome. De Martino was the son of a film make-up artist. He started his career as a child actor.

On attending university, De Martino studied law. Martino returned to a career in cinema working as an editor, screenwriter and assistant director. Martino stated he was encouraged to be a director by Federico Fellini for whom he supervised the dubbing for La Dolce Vita. De Martino was also very active in the field of dubbing, and he was dubbing director for more than 1,500 films.

De Martino was one of the active directors in the Italian genre cinema between the 1960s and mid-1980s; his films spanned different genres, including Peplum, Eurospy, Spaghetti Western, Euro War, Poliziotteschi, and Giallo films. A real life friend of Sergio Leone, he was second unit director in Duck, You Sucker!

The films he made in the 1980s were all made for the foreign markets. These films were all made with a pseudonym of Martin Herbert as De Martino said he felt "a little ashamed" of them. In 1980, De Martino nearly lost his home when his film The Pumaman failed at the box office. Pumaman was followed by a few more films, concluding his career with Miami Golem. Martino left the production of Miami Golem before its completion, saying that "What you see in the film is shot by me, but nothing of the editing process and post-production is mine."

He died in Rome on 2 June 2015 at the age of 85.

== Selected filmography ==
Note: The films listed as N/A are not necessarily chronological.

Title	Year	Credited as				Notes	Ref(s)
Title	Year	Director	Screenwriter	Screen story writer	Other	Notes	Ref(s)
Scipio Africanus: The Defeat of Hannibal	1937				Yes	Actor as "Son of Scipio"	
Minotaur, the Wild Beast of Crete	1960				Yes	Assistant director	
The Invincible Gladiator	1961	Yes	Yes		Yes	producer	
Gladiators 7	1962		Yes	Yes			
Medusa Against the Son of Hercules	1963	Yes	Yes				
The Blancheville Monster	1963	Yes					
Gli invincibili sette	1963	Yes	Yes	Yes			
Gladiators Seven	1964	Yes	Yes				
The Triumph of Hercules	1964	Yes					
100.000 dollari per Ringo	1965	Yes	Yes	Yes			
Heroes of Fort Worth	1965	Yes					
The Spy with Ten Faces	1966	Yes	Yes				
Special Mission Lady Chaplin	1966	Yes					
Django Shoots First	1966	Yes					
Dirty Heroes	1967	Yes	Yes				
O.K. Connery	1967	Yes					
Bandits in Rome	1968	Yes	Yes				
Carnal Circuit	1969	Yes	Yes				
The Man with Icy Eyes	1971	Yes					
Crime Boss	1972	Yes					
The Killer Is on the Phone	1972	Yes	Yes	Yes			
Ci risiamo, vero Provvidenza?	1973	Yes					
Counselor at Crime	1973	Yes	Yes	Yes			
The Antichrist	1974	Yes	Yes	Yes			
Strange Shadows in an Empty Room	1976	Yes					
Holocaust 2000	1977	Yes	Yes	Yes			
The Pumaman	1980	Yes		Yes			
Blood Link	1982	Yes		Yes			
Formula for a Murder	1985	Yes	Yes	Yes			
Miami Golem	1985	Yes					
