= To Skin a Spy =

- Directed by: Jacques Deray
- Written by: José Giovanni
- Produced by: Eugène Tucherer
- Starring: Lino Ventura; Jean Bouise; Marilù Tolo; Jean Servais
- Cinematography: Jean Boffety
- Music by: Michel Magne
- Release date: 24 August 1966
- Running time: 90 minutes
- Countries: France; Italy
- Language: French

To Skin a Spy (French: Avec la peau des autres) is a 1966 French-Italian thriller film directed by Jacques Deray. The film details the journey of a French spy sent to Vienna to stop a security leak whose mission is re-directed when he comes into contact with international enemy agents.

== Cast ==
- Lino Ventura - Pascal Fabre
- Jean Servais - Weigelt
- Marilù Tolo - Anna
- Jean Bouise - Margeri
- Wolfgang Preiss - Chalieff
- Louis Arbessier - The Colonel
- Adrian Hoven - Mr. Kern
- Ellen Bahl - Mrs. Kern
- Charles Régnier - Ehrfurt
- Reinhard Kolldehoff - Hoffmann
