= Adriano Bolzoni =

Italian journalist, writer and film director

- Born: 14 April 1919; Cremona, Italy
- Died: 2003 (aged 83–84); Italy
- Occupations: Film director, film producer, screenwriter

Adriano Bolzoni (14 April 1919 – 2003) was an Italian journalist, writer and film director.

== Life and career ==
Born in Cremona, Bolzoni started his career as a journalist, being war correspondent from the front of World War II. Later, he became director of Reporter, a right-wing weekly magazine published between 1959 and 1960 which is best remembered for having Pier Paolo Pasolini as film critic. In the 1960s he became editor of the newspaper Corriere della Sera.

Bolzoni entered the cinema industry in 1948, collaborating at the screenplay of the adventure film I contrabbandieri del mare, directed by Roberto Bianchi Montero; later he was a prolific screenwriter, arousing some fame with several successful Spaghetti Westerns and poliziotteschi. He was also an occasional director of films and documentaries and an essayist.

== Partial filmography ==
- I'm the Capataz (1951)
- Minnesota Clay (1964) Screenwriter
- Savage Gringo (1966) Screenwriter
- Avenger X (1967) Story
