= Agent 077: Mission Bloody Mary =

Agente 077: Missione Bloody Mary
- Original film poster
- Directed by: Sergio Grieco
- Written by: Sandro Continenza; Marcello Coscia; Leonardo Martín
- Produced by: Edmondo Amati
- Starring: Ken Clark
- Cinematography: Juan Julio Baena
- Music by: Angelo Francesco Lavagnino title song Ennio Morricone sung by Maurizio Graf
- Release date: 13 August 1965
- Running time: 101 minutes
- Country: Italy
- Language: Italian

Agent 077: Mission Bloody Mary or Agente 077: Missione Bloody Mary is a 1965 Italian/Spanish/French international co-production spy adventure film and the first of the Secret Agent 077 film series directed by Sergio Grieco.

== Plot ==
A group of criminals called the Black Lily murder and replace a US Air Force navigator near a base in the United Kingdom. The infiltrator crashes the plane in order to recover a new deadly nuclear bomb code named "Bloody Mary". The criminals sell the weapon to Red China. A CIA agent tracks down the weapon from France to Spain where it travels by a cargo ship to Athens.

== Cast ==
- Ken Clark as Dick Malloy/Jack Clifton
- Helga Liné as Elsa Freeman
- Philippe Hersent as Lester
- Maryse Guy Mitsouko as Kuan
- Umberto Raho as Prof. Betz (credited as Umi Raho)
- Silvana Jachino as Juanita (credited as Susan Terry)
- Antonio Gradoli (credited as Anthony Gradwell)
- Andrea Scotti
- Brand Lyonell
- Peter Blades
- Peter Bach
- Franca Polesello as Malloy's/Clifton's girlfriend
- Pulla Coy
- Mirko Ellis
- Erika Blanc
