= Sandro Continenza =

Italian screenwriter (1920–1996)

- Born: 13 July 1920; Rome, Kingdom of Italy
- Died: 21 November 1996 (aged 76); Rome, Italy
- Occupation: Screenwriter
- Years active: 1949–1982

Sandro Continenza (13 July 1920 – 21 November 1996) was an Italian screenwriter. He wrote for 142 films between 1949 and 1982. He was born in Rome, Italy.

== Selected filmography ==
- Toto Looks for a Wife (1950)
- Appointment for Murder (1951)
- The Angels of the District (1952)
- The Tired Outlaw (1952)
- The Dream of Zorro (1952)
- Neapolitan Turk (1953)
- If You Won a Hundred Million (1953)
- Funniest Show on Earth (1953)
- A Day in Court (1954)
- The Miller's Beautiful Wife (1955)
- Donatella (1956)
- Lucky to Be a Woman (1956)
- Totò, Peppino e la malafemmina (1956)
- I giorni più belli (1956)
- A Woman Alone (1956)
- Gerusalemme liberata (1956)
- The Day the Sky Exploded (1958)
- The Italians They Are Crazy (1958)
- Il vedovo (1959)
- Il Mattatore (1960)
- Hercules in the Haunted World (1961)
- Hercules and the Conquest of Atlantis (1961)
- Gladiators 7 (1962)
- I cuori infranti (1963)
- Agent 077: From the Orient with Fury (1965)
- Agent 077: Mission Bloody Mary (1965)
- Lo scippo (1965)
- Five Thousand Dollars on One Ace (1965)
- Heroes of the West (1965)
- Two Mafiosi Against Goldfinger (1965)
- Pleasant Nights (1966)
- Come rubammo la bomba atomica (1967)
- Master Stroke (1967)
- Alibi (1969)
- The Cop (1970)
- The Things of Life (1970)
- Seven Murders for Scotland Yard (1971)
- Il domestico (1974)
- Let Sleeping Corpses Lie (1974)
