= Edmondo Amati =

Italian film producer

- Born: 1920; Italy
- Died: 2002 (aged 81–82); Rome, Italy
- Occupation: Film producer
- Years active: 1964-1984

Edmondo Amati (1920 – 2002) was an Italian film producer. He produced 55 films between 1964 and 1984, including Dominion: Prequel to the Exorcist (2005), U-571 (2000), Golden Balls (1993), Cannibals in the Streets (1980), L'ultimo squalo (1980), Holocaust 2000 (1978), Strange Shadows in an Empty Room (1976), L'anticristo (1974), Romanzo popolare (1974), Polvere di stelle (1973), Il Consigliori (1973), Sette scialli di seta gialla (1972) and In nome del popolo italiano (1971).

== Selected filmography ==
- Two Mafiamen in the Far West (1964)
- Agent 077: Mission Bloody Mary (1965)
- Agent 077: From the Orient with Fury (1965)
- For a Few Extra Dollars (1966)
- Dirty Heroes (1967)
- Master Stroke (1967)
- Let Sleeping Corpses Lie (1974)
- Scandal in the Family (1975)
- Four of the Apocalypse (1975)
- Holocaust 2000 (1977)
