= Eva Thulin =

Swedish actress

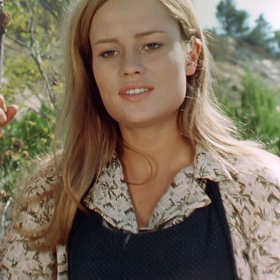
- Thulin in The Seducers (1969)
- Born: 1945
- Education: Lund University
- Occupation: Actress
- Known for: Top Sensation

Eva Thulin is a Swedish actress who appeared in Italian cinema.

== Career ==
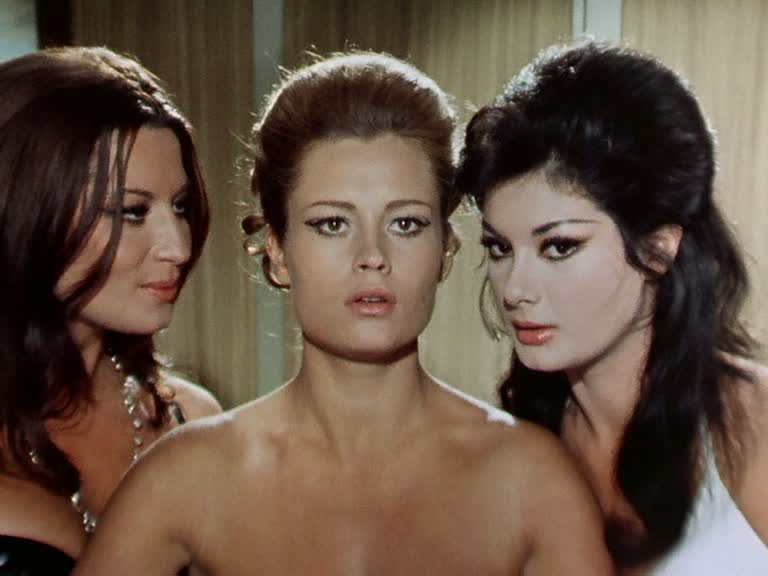
Edwige Fenech, Thulin and Rosalba Neri in The Seducers (1969)

Thulin graduated from Lund University in Lund and was a performer at the Malmö National Theatre. She presented her thesis with an essay on the work of Harold Pinter, whose works Thulin performed on some occasions on the stage of the Malmö Theatre. She had a short period of notoriety in Italian cinema in the late sixties and early seventies, thanks to her participation in genre and drama films of the time, and her appearance on some magazine covers. She is also remembered for her part in the Italian musical film Zum Zum Zum nº 2 (1969), directed by Bruno Corbucci. Other film appearances include La stagione dei sensi (1969) by Massimo Franciosa, and The Seducers (1969) by Ottavio Alessi, in which her character takes part in a lesbian threesome with the characters of Rosalba Neri and Edwige Fenech, although this is only implied in some cuts of the film.

== Filmography ==
Year	Title	Role
1969	Top Sensation	Beba
1969	La stagione dei sensi	Michele
1969	Zum Zum Zum nº 2	Valeria
1970	Invasion	Sandra
