= What Ever Happened to Baby Toto? =

- Directed by: Ottavio Alessi
- Written by: Ottavio Alessi; Bruno Corbucci; Giovanni Grimaldi
- Produced by: Alberto Pugliese; Luciano Ercoli
- Starring: Totò
- Cinematography: Sergio d'Offizi
- Music by: Armando Trovajoli
- Release date: 1964
- Running time: 101 min
- Country: Italy
- Language: Italian

What Ever Happened to Baby Toto? (Italian: Che fine ha fatto Totò Baby?) is a 1964 Italian black comedy film written and directed by Ottavio Alessi, starring Totò. It is a parody of Robert Aldrich's What Ever Happened to Baby Jane?.

== Plot ==
A pair of step brothers, Totò Baby and Pietro, make a living stealing suitcases at the Termini Station in Rome. They discover within a stolen piece of luggage a corpse. Trying to get rid of the incriminating evidence, they mistakenly swap the suitcase with a German hitchhiker.

Forced to retrieve the "corpus delicti" they are discovered by Mischa, a Count who is hosting the beautiful foreign tourists. He decides to blackmail the step brothers, asking for their assassination of his rich wife, in exchange for his silence with the police.

After the death of the woman (who loses her life as a result of a fright), Totò Baby becomes a sadistic serial killer as he loses all inhibition after starting to eat marijuana by mistake.

He kills the Count and more people, including a young postman which is then walled up inside Misha's villa. He then escapes and forces his brother to follow him. He drags him to the beach and seems about to leave him buried alive in the sand with broken legs, but gets recognized and arrested by chance by the police. He ends up committed in an institute for the criminally insane, where he spends his time typing his autobiography on an imaginary typewriter.

== Cast ==
- Totò as Baby Toto / Baby Toto's father
- Pietro De Vico as Pietro
- Mischa Auer as Mischa (The Count)
- Alvaro Alvisi as Police Commissioner
- Ivy Holzer as Inga
- Alicia Brandet as Helga
- Gina Mascetti as Mischa's wife
- Mario Castellani as The director of the orphanage
- Olimpia Cavalli as Baby Toto's stepmother
- Peppino De Martino as The Maresciallo
- Franco Ressel as The American Official
- Giuseppe Tosi as tall man
- Renato Montalbano as The young postman
