= The Human Beast =

The Human Beast may refer to:

- La Bête humaine, an 1890 novel by Émile Zola
  - La Bête Humaine (film), a 1938 French crime drama film directed by Jean Renoir based on the novel
- Beast with a Gun, a 1977 Italian crime film directed by Sergio Grieco
