= Johnny Yuma =

Johnny Yuma may refer to:

- Johnny Yuma (film), a 1966 spaghetti western starring Mark Damon and directed by Romolo Guerrieri
- Johnny Yuma, a character in a 1950s television show The Rebel
  - "The Rebel — Johnny Yuma", the theme song of The Rebel, sung by Johnny Cash
