= Geoffrey Copleston =

British actor

- Born: Gerald Geoffrey Copleston; 18 March 1921; Manchester, UK
- Died: 6 October 1998 (age 77)
- Occupations: Actor, voice actor, translator, screenwriter
- Years active: 1956–1998

Gerald Geoffrey Copleston (18 March 1921 – 6 October 1998) was an English actor, voice actor, and translator who worked primarily in Italian genre cinema. He worked on more than one hundred films beginning in 1956, including many English-language dubs of European films.

== Filmography ==
=== Live-action roles ===
Year	Title	Role	Notes
1956	War and Peace	French Officer	Uncredited
1965	War Italian Style	American Colonel	Uncredited
1965	James Tont operazione U.N.O.	Secret Service Director	uncredited
1966	Me, Me, Me... and the Others	Traveller in restaurant	Uncredited
1966	James Tont operazione D.U.E.	Secret Service Director	
1966	The Hills Run Red	Brian Horner	
1966	7 Golden Women Against Two 07: Treasure Hunt	Martin Borman	
1966	Perry Grant, agente di ferro	Chief Bowles	
1966	Superargo Versus Diabolicus	Conrad, the Council President	
1967	Matchless	Arthur	Uncredited
1967	Riderà!	J.K. Deline	
1968	Mr. Kinky	Bagni	
1968	The Girl Who Couldn't Say No	Bald Man	Uncredited
1968	Seven Times Seven	Chief Inspector	Uncredited
1969	Detective Belli	Chief of Police	
1969	One on Top of the Other	District Attorney	Uncredited
1971	Scipio the African	Senator	Uncredited
1971	Paid in Blood	Alec Quinter	Uncredited
1973	Bread and Chocolate	Paolo Boegli	
1974	The Night Porter	Kurt Mahler	
1975	Red Coat	RCMP Chief	
1976	Salon Kitty	Dinner Guest	Uncredited
1976	Mimì Bluette... fiore del mio giardino		
1976	A Matter of Time	Hotel Manager	
1976	The Big Operator	The Texan	
1977	A Man Called Magnum	German Boss	
1977	Beyond Good and Evil	House Guest	Uncredited
1977	Emanuelle and the Last Cannibals	Wilkes	
1977	Sahara Cross	Colonel	
1978	The Greatest Battle	SS General Jürgens	
1978	Io tigro, tu tigri, egli tigra	The General	Uncredited
1979	Lovers and Liars	Male Bystander	
1979	Lobster for Breakfast	Duchamp	
1979	Dr. Jekyll Likes Them Hot	Archibald Gold	
1979	Velvet Hands	Benny	
1980	The Pumaman	Sir George Bradley	
1980	S*H*E	UN Speaker	
1980	The Warning	Procuratore Vesce	
1980	Savage Breed	Conti	
1980	Mia moglie è una strega	Autista	
1981	Bianco, rosso e Verdone	Russian Man	Uncredited
1981	The Black Cat	Inspector Flynn	
1981	Bollenti spiriti	Dr. Eric Stainer	
1982	Dio li fa poi li accoppia	The Burgomaster of Kellenborg	Uncredited
1982	Buona come il pane	Colonel Vittorio Bisceglie	
1983	Notturno	Ambassador	Uncredited
1983	Stangata napoletana		
1983	Il tassinaro	American Tourist	
1984	One Hundred Days in Palermo	Judge	Uncredited
1984	Vediamoci chiaro	Mercalli	
1985	The Assisi Underground	Police Chief Bertolucci	
1985	Madman at War	German Commander	
1985	Wild Team	Harker	
1986	Detective School Dropouts	Mr. Hamelfarm	
1987	The Belly of an Architect	Caspetti	
1987	The Sicilian	Pathe Journalist	
1988	Big Man	Henry Winterbottom	TV movie
1989	Robot Jox	Confederation Commissioner	
1989	Willy Signori e vengo da lontano	Direttore del giornale	
1989	The Betrothed	Merchant	3 episodes
1990	The Dark Sun		
1990	Black Cobra 3: The Manila Connection	The Senator	Uncredited
1990	The Godfather Part III	Priest	Uncredited
1990	Frankenstein Unbound	Innkeeper	
1990	A Season of Giants	Taddeo Taddei	TV movie
1990	C'è posto per tutti	Americano	
1991	The Pit and the Pendulum	Butcher	
1992	L'amante scomoda	Mr. Manzetti	
1993	Killer Rules	Chairman of the Board	TV movie
1994	The Web of Silence - A.I.D.S.	Walter's Father	
1994	Klon		
1995	The Second Time	Stefano	Uncredited
1996	Fatal Frames	Mr. Fairbrain	
1998	Besieged	Sweaty Man	Uncredited

=== Partial dubbing roles ===
Year	Title	Role	Actor	Notes
1969	The Battle of El Alamein	General Schwartz	Gérard Herter	
1969	Machine Gun McCain	Priest	Euplio Moscusu	
1971	Blackie the Pirate	DeLussac	Carlo Reali	
1972	Don't Torture a Duckling	Police Commissioner	Virgilio Gazzolo	
1974	Emergency Squad	Calò	Antonio La Raina	
1974	What Have They Done to Your Daughters?	Dr. Concotti	Francesco D'Adda	
1975	Deep Red	Bardi	Piero Mazzinghi	
1975	Manhunt in the City	Ludovico Mieli	Claudio Gora	
1976	Live Like a Cop, Die Like a Man	Sergeant	Sergio Ammirata	
1976	The Cop in Blue Jeans	Barkeep	Domenico Cianfriglia	
1976	Violent Naples	Antinori	Attilio Duse	
1976	The Big Racket	Chief	Edy Biagetti	
1977	Suspiria	Professor Milius	Rudolf Schündler	
1977	The Cynic, the Rat and the Fist	Marchetti	Marco Guglielmi	
1977	The Heroin Busters	Ross	Ferdinando Poggi	
1977	La belva col mitra	Caroli	Vittorio Duse	
1978	Convoy Busters	Degan	Massimo Serato	
1979	Master with Cracked Fingers	Big Boss	Yeong-Mun Kwon	
1980	Cannibal Holocaust	NYU Chancellor	Paolo Paoloni	
1980	Eaten Alive!	Jonas Melvin	Ivan Rassimov	
1980	Nightmare City	Mr. Desmond	Ugo Bologna	
1982	1990: The Bronx Warriors	Samuel Fisher	Ennio Girolami	
