= Ring Around the Moon =

Ring Around the Moon, Ring Round the Moon or Rings around the Moon may refer to:

- Ring Around the Moon (film), a 1936 drama film
- "Ring Around the Moon" (Space: 1999), a 1976 episode of Space: 1999
- Ring Round the Moon, a play by Jean Anouilh adapted by Christopher Fry
- Rings Around the Moon (album), a 1978 album by Frank Carillo
- "Rings Around the Moon", a 1997 song from Still Waters by the Bee Gees

== See also ==
- Moon ring, a weather phenomenon during which a large whitish ring circles the Moon
- Ring system, or debris ring, for a moon
