= Corbucci =

Corbucci is an Italian-language surname. Notable people with the surname include:

- Bruno Corbucci (1931–1996), Italian screenwriter and film director
- Sergio Corbucci (1926–1990), Italian film director
- Leonardo Corbucci, Italian-American film director
