= Rosalba Neri =

Italian actress (born 1939)

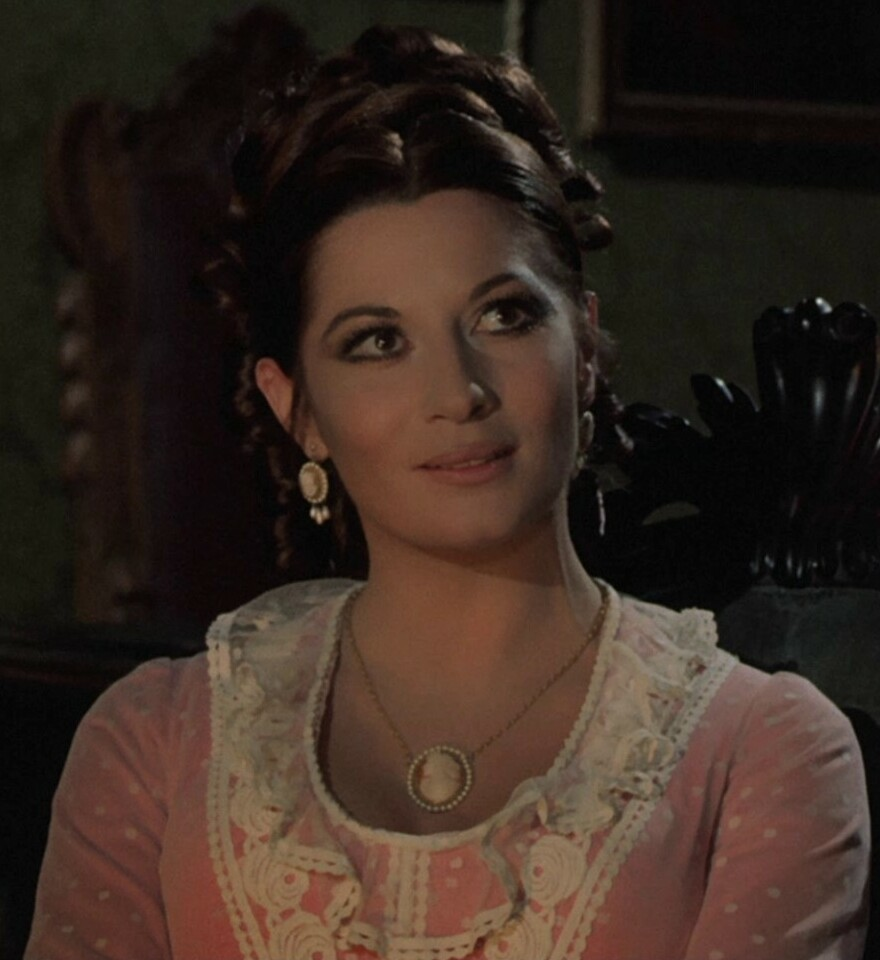
- Neri in Lady Frankenstein (1971)
- Born: 19 June 1939 (age 87); Forlì, Kingdom of Italy
- Other name: Sara Bey
- Education: Centro Sperimentale di Cinematografia
- Occupation: Actress
- Years active: 1958–1976
- Known for: Esther and the King; The Arena; Lady Frankenstein

Rosalba Neri (born 19 June 1939) is a retired Italian actress.

== Early life ==
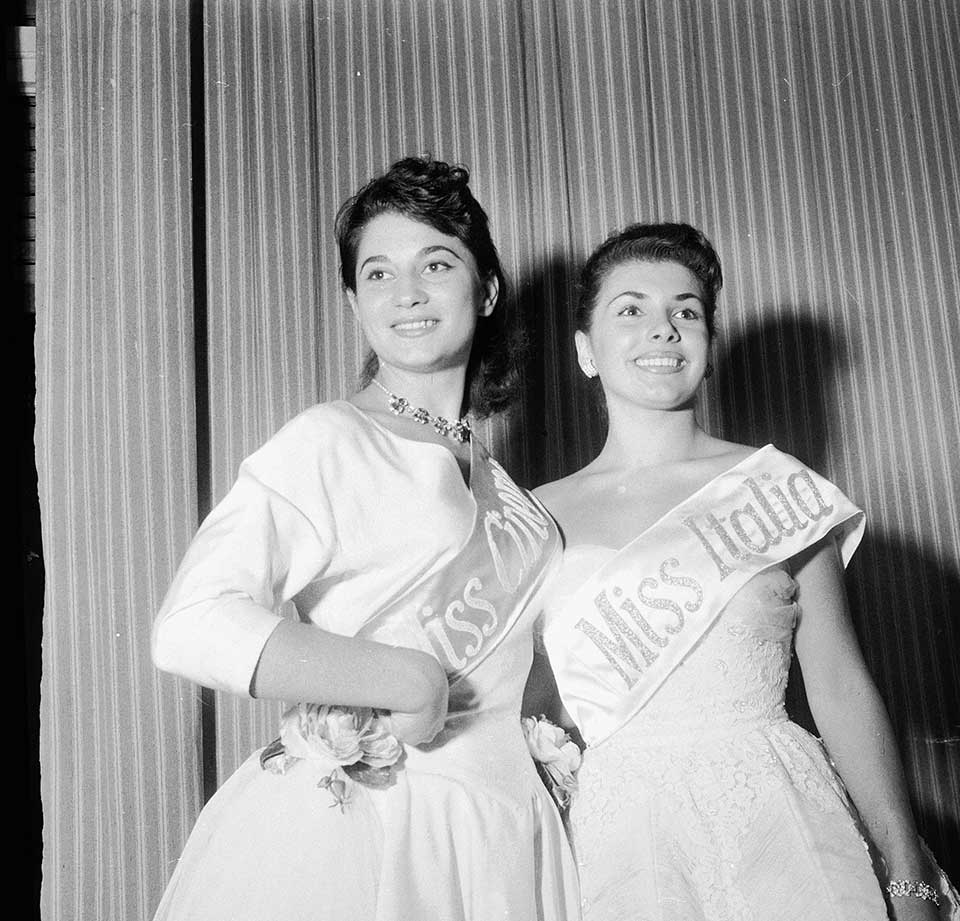
Neri (left) with winner Nives Zegna during the Miss Italia 1956 beauty pageant

Born in Forlì, Emilia-Romagna, Italy, Neri was regarded for her beauty even in youth, winning a beauty pageant when she was still young. Eventually pursuing an acting career, she attended the Centro Sperimentale di Cinematografia (Centre for Experimental Cinematography) in Rome, graduating in 1959. She also received an offer to attend the Actors Studio in the United States, but did not accept.

== Career ==
She made her film debut in 1958 in the film Mogli pericolose. She is uncredited in this comedy, which was directed by Luigi Comencini. Her second film role was in Roberto Rossellini's prize-winning drama Era notte a Roma in 1960.

=== Historical roles ===
In 1960, she appeared in two sword and sandal films set in the Ancient world. The first was Il Sepolcro dei Re (AKA Cleopatra's Daughter or The Tomb of the King). This film tells the story of Nemorat, an Egyptian pharaoh who was instrumental in the creation of the pyramids of Giza due to the intrigues surrounding his death and entombment.

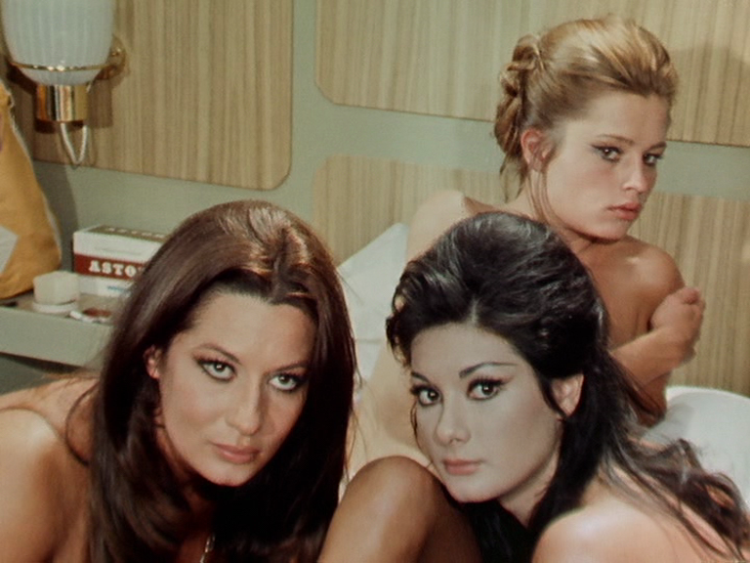
Edwige Fenech, Eva Thulin and Neri in The Seducers (1969)

The second was Raoul Walsh's Esther and the King (1960), starring Joan Collins as the Biblical Jewish Queen. Rosalba played Haman's wife Zeresh and was assassinated by someone who mistook her for the Queen. Because of her dark, sultry beauty, Rosalba was often a natural fit to play certain legendary characters.

She was Ramses' intended bride in the Hercules Adventure, Il leone di Tebe (The Lion of Thebes) in 1964. She played Delilah, the Biblical beauty who was the downfall of the Old Testament hero, Samson, in The Great Leaders (1965). She returned to the genre in The Arena (1974).

Although starring roles were few and far between for Neri, she worked steadily throughout the 1960s/70s in supporting and sometimes nondescript roles, such as her turn as a harem girl in El Cid (1961).

=== Spy films ===
Neri had quite a few roles in Eurospy intrigue films, often playing a less-than-saintly character. She was Faddja in 1965's Superseven Chiama Cairo (Superseven Calls on Cairo), one of the dangerous women that the spy, a James Bond-like character, comes into contact with. Also in 1965, she appeared in Due Mafiosi contro Goldginger (Two Mafiosi Against Goldfinger).

In 1967, she was Amalia in Password: Uccidete Agente Gordon (Password: Kill Agent Gordon). The same year, she played her first part for Spanish director Jess Franco in a spy film send-up done in comic book style, Lucky, the Inscrutable, starring Ray Danton. In the following year, she appeared in OSS 117 - Double Agent (1968).

=== Spaghetti Westerns ===
She followed the trends of European cinema by appearing in several Spaghetti Westerns such as Johnny Yuma (1966), Arizona Colt (1966), Long Days of Hate (1968), A Long Ride from Hell (1968), The Reward's Yours... The Man's Mine (1969), Arizona Colt Returns (1971), Drummer of Vengeance (1971) and Man Called Invincible (1973).

=== Gialli and erotic horror films ===
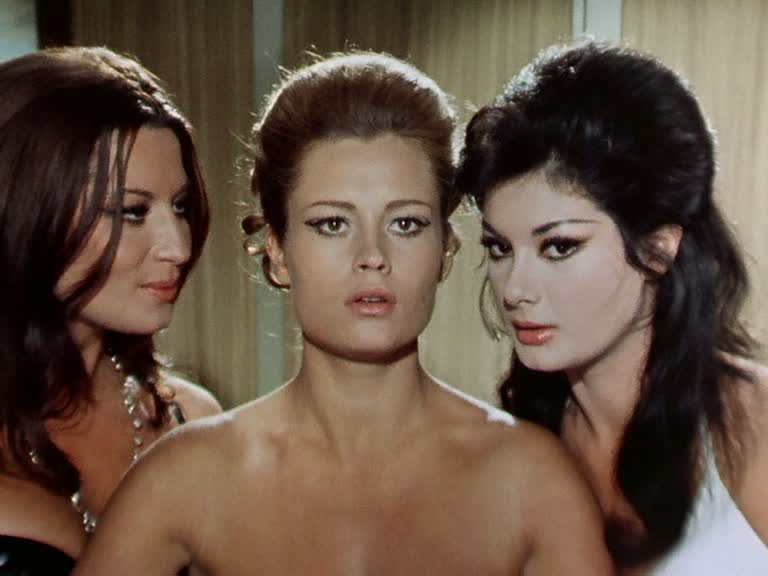
Neri (left) alongside Eva Thulin and Edwige Fenech in The Seducers (1969)

Neri, the bombshell, was also much in demand for erotic giallo thrillers, horror, and sexploitation films. She was in Jess Franco's box office hit 99 Women (1969), one of the first women in prison films, and Top Sensation (The Seducers) (1969) opposite Edwige Fenech. In 1972 she played Farley Granger's wife in Amuck!. Granger plays a wealthy author, and the couple engages in kinky sex games with his beautiful secretary (Barbara Bouchet) while also playing af dangerous psychological game of life and death. Also in 1972, Neri played the lead role in the erotic horror flick Lucifera: Demon Lover.

Bouchet and Neri would team up in 1972 in another movie combining sex with horror, Casa d’appuntamento (French Sex Murders). A jewel thief is accused of murdering a prostitute but is decapitated in a motorcycle accident prior to the trial. When those involved in the trial start dying off, everyone wonders if the dead man has come back to exact his revenge.

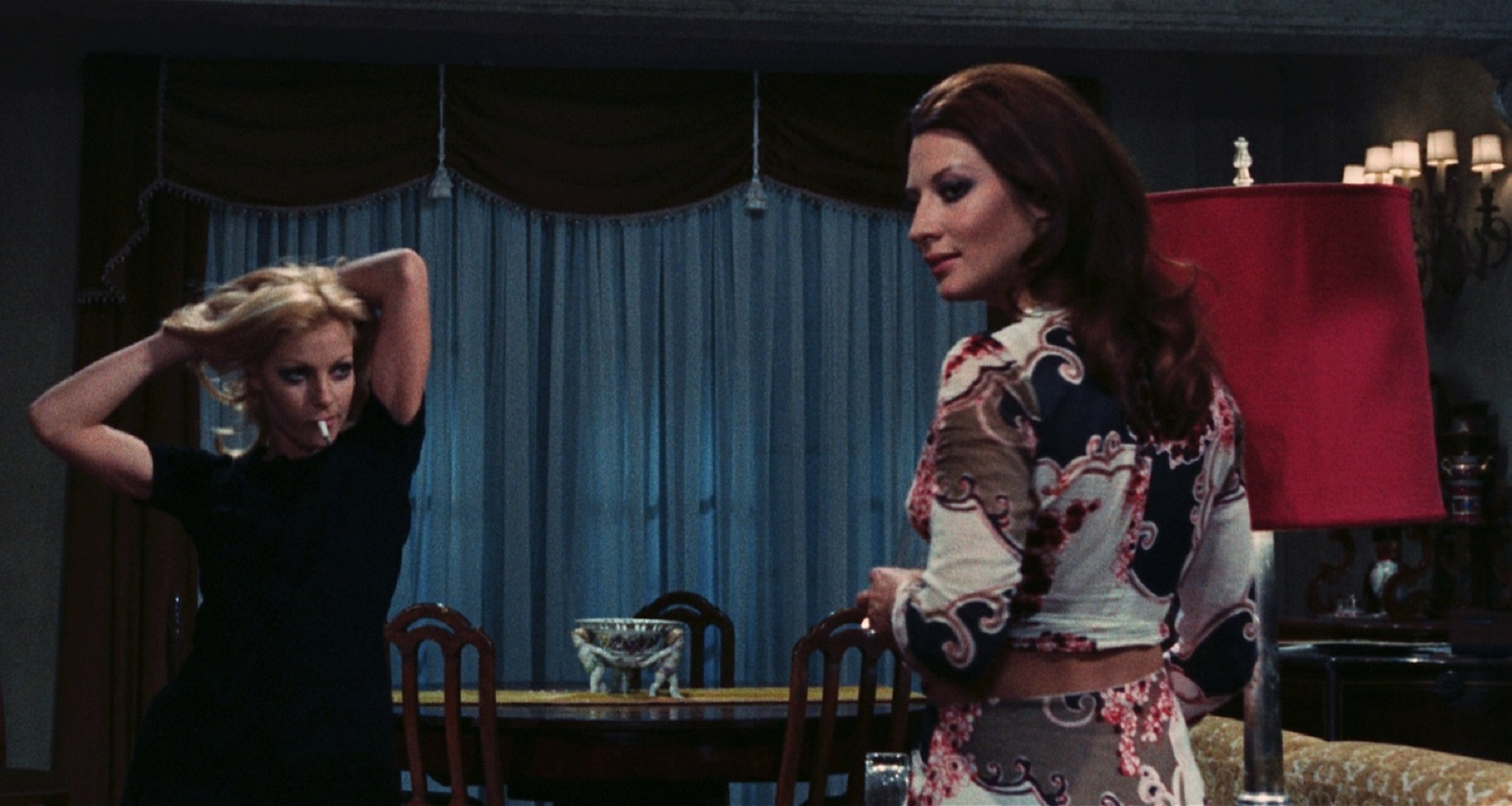
Neri and Patrizia Viotti in a scene from Amuck! (1972)

Perhaps Neri's best-known films are from the horror genre. Credited as Sara Bay, she played Tania Frankenstein, the daughter of the monster's creator, in 1971's Lady Frankenstein. Tania was willing to take her father's work to new – and frightening – levels. It is considered a B movie classic.

In 1973, she starred in The Devil's Wedding Night as Lady Dracula, a vampire who uses Dracula's ring to lure young virgins to her home so she can murder them and bathe in their blood (à la the medieval Countess Elizabeth Báthory). In Italy, it was released as Il Plenilunio dell Vergini (Full Moon of the Virgins).

== Retirement ==
Neri appeared in a few more films, such as: No Way Out (1973), Loving Cousins (1974), Blood River (1974) and Il Pomicione (1976), which is her last credited film.

== Selected filmography ==
- Escape by Night (1960)
- Esther and the King (1960)
- Those Two in the Legion (1962)
- Cleopatra's Daughter (1962)
- Hercules vs. Moloch (1963)
- Hercules and the Black Pirates (1964)
- The Lion of Thebes (1964)
- Corpse for the Lady (1964)
- Desert Raiders (1964)
- 3 Avengers (1964)
- I Kill, You Kill (1965)
- Marvelous Angelique (1965)
- Super Seven Calling Cairo (1965)
- Gideon and Samson (1965)
- Two Mafiosi Against Goldfinger (1965)
- The Spy with Ten Faces (1966)
- Password: Kill Agent Gordon (1966)
- Johnny Yuma (1966)
- Arizona Colt (1966)
- Lucky, the Inscrutable (1967)
- Long Days of Hate (1968)
- A Long Ride from Hell (1968)
- OSS 117 - Double Agent (1968)
- 99 Women (1969)
- The Seducers (1969)
- Marquis de Sade: Justine (1969)
- The Castle of Fu Manchu (1969)
- The Reward's Yours... The Man's Mine (1969)
- Arizona Colt Returns (1970)
- Slaughter Hotel (1971)
- Drummer of Vengeance (1971)
- Lady Frankenstein (1971)
- Lucifera: Demon Lover (1972)
- Amuck! (1972)
- Smile Before Death (1972)
- French Sex Murders (1972)
- The Mighty Anselmo and His Squire (1972)
- Watch Out Gringo! Sabata Will Return (1972) as kidnapped girl
- The Devil's Wedding Night (1973)
- No Way Out (1973)
- Man Called Invincible (1973)
- The Arena (1974)
- High School Girl (1974)
- Libera, My Love (1975)
