= Cinzia Gizzi =

- Born: February 3, 1954 (age 72); Pescara, Italy
- Genres: Jazz
- Occupations: Pianist, composer, arranger
- Instrument: Piano

Cinzia Gizzi (Pescara, February 3, 1954) is an Italian jazz pianist, composer, and arranger.

She is known for being the first woman in Italy to hold a Jazz Chair at a state conservatory and for her extensive concert and broadcasting activity.

== Biography ==
Born in Pescara, she began studying classical piano at the age of eight. During her university years, she moved to Rome, where she graduated in Anglo-American Literature at Sapienza University of Rome.

Approaching jazz, she became active in the Roman musical scene between the late 1970s and early 1980s. In the early 1980s, she joined the rhythmic section of the Mississippi Jazz Club in Rome. In this context, she accompanied numerous international musicians touring Italy, including Johnny Griffin, Al Cohn, Eddie "Lockjaw" Davis, Al Grey, Hal Singer, Pepper Adams, Benny Bailey, Duško Gojković, Joe Newman, Harry "Sweets" Edison, and George Masso.

In 1988, she won a scholarship to the Berklee College of Music in Boston, where she moved to deepen her studies in piano and arrangement, graduating in Professional Music in 1990. During her stay in the United States, she studied privately in New York City with pianist Jaki Byard and continued her training with Charlie Banacos. In 1994, she received her Diploma in Piano from the Licinio Refice Conservatory in Frosinone.

In the academic year 1995–1996, she became the holder of the Jazz Chair at the Francesco Cilea Conservatory in Reggio Calabria, becoming the first woman to hold such a position in an Italian conservatory. She subsequently taught at the conservatories of Trieste, Messina, Catania, L'Aquila, and Latina, concluding her teaching career in November 2022 at the Santa Cecilia Conservatory in Rome.

Active also as a musicologist, since 2016 she has directed the music study series Il Suono e il Tempo for the publishing house Aracne. As the series curator, she signed the preface for the essay Blues che viaggiano in prima classe by Mario Donatone (2022). In 2017, she received the "Career Award" during the 28th edition of the Profilo Donna International Award in Modena.

=== Festivals and reviews ===
Throughout her career, she has participated in numerous prominent jazz festivals and reviews, both in Italy and abroad.

In 1985, at the Roma Jazz Festival at the Mississippi Jazz Club in Rome, accompanying Johnny Griffin, Duško Gojković, Benny Bailey, and Harry "Sweets" Edison. In 1990, in a trio at the 13th La Spezia International Festival and at the 16th Foggia Jazz Festival. In 1992, in a quartet at the Bari Jazz Festival, in a quintet at the Perugia Jazz Festival, and in a trio at Pescara Jazz 'n Fall. In 1993, at the Fano Jazz Festival, performing in a quintet with Jon Faddis.

Two years later, she was a guest at the Festival Internazionale di Mezza Estate in Tagliacozzo and, during the same period, played in various international contexts in Lisbon, Warsaw, and Rio de Janeiro (1995).

In 1999, she participated in the Pescara Jazz Festival, performing in a duo with Giovanni Tommaso, while in 2002 she was invited to the Euro Jazz Festival in Mexico City.

She subsequently took part in Italian reviews dedicated to jazz music and female creativity, such as Lucca Jazz Donna (2005), and established events such as the Estate Musicale Frentana in Lanciano (2006) and the Piazza Armerina Jazz Festival (2010).

Since 2011, she has held several solo piano concerts at the Accademia Filarmonica Romana, returning to the same venue in 2017. She also performed at the Casa del Jazz in Rome in 2012 and 2024, and participated in the 2018 and 2019 editions of the Percorsi Jazz Festival in the capital. In 2023, she was among the guest artists at the JazzIdea Festival in Rome.

=== Radio and television ===
She has collaborated continuously with RAI, combining her musical activity with that of an author and host of radio programs dedicated to the history and protagonists of jazz.

In radio, she took part in broadcasts such as Sera Jazz (Radio Rai 2, 1985) and Radiounoserata Jazz (Radio Rai 1, 1988–1991, 1993). Between the late 1980s and early 1990s, she created and hosted several monographic cycles, including Breve storia del piano jazz (1988, 10 episodes), Storia degli arrangiatori (1989, 16 episodes), and I pianisti hard bop (1990, 12 episodes). She also collaborated on programs such as Radiouno ’90, 500 ma non-li dimostra, L’occhio sulla musica, Stasera a Via Asiago, and more recently, La stanza della musica on Radio Rai 3 (2005).

On television, she has appeared in numerous RAI programs since the 1980s, including Direttissima (Rai 2, 1981), 30 anni di storia (Rai 1, 1983), and Vediamoci sul due (Rai 2, 1984). She participated as a soloist and leader in Italia Mia (Rai 1, 1986) and Sanremo Jazz Image (Rai 1, 1992), as well as broadcasts like Tandem (Rai 2, 1987).

=== Arrangements and conducting ===
Since 2003, she has combined her concert activity with that of an arranger and conductor of orchestral ensembles. In that year, she conducted the Tartini Conservatory Jazz Band at the Teatro Verdi in Trieste. Between 2006 and 2009, she oversaw several productions at the Teatro Vittorio Emanuele II in Messina, leading the Corelli Jazz Ensemble.

In 2006, she arranged the Suite for Cello and Jazz Piano Trio by Claude Bolling for the Tartini String Orchestra, conducted by Maestro Antonio Cipriani, at the Teatro Comunale D’Annunzio in Latina. She collaborated with Vatican Radio in 2007 and participated in the Mantova Jazz Festival the same year. In 2008, she conducted the ONJC Jazz Band at the Teatro Piccolo in Milan.

In 2022, she returned to conducting in an institutional setting at the Academic Hall of the Santa Cecilia Conservatory in Rome, conducting Symbiosis by Claus Ogerman.

== Selected works ==
- Arrangiatori Jazz. Pagine d’autore in un percorso storico di analisi musicale, Rome, Aracne Editrice, 2016.
- Arrangiatori Jazz II. Pagine d’autore in un percorso storico di analisi musicale. I contrappuntisti, Rome, Aracne Editrice, 2020.
- Jazz Arrangers II. Author pages in a Historical Path of Musical Analysis. The Contrapuntalists, Rome, Aracne Editrice, 2024.

== Discography ==
=== As leader ===
- 1991 – Cinzia Gizzi Trio & Sextet (Pentaflowers)
- 1992 – Cinzia Gizzi Trio (Lupus)
- 1998 – Four G In Lanciano (live, dfv label blue jazz) – guest George Masso
- 2001 – Soul Eyes (Primrose Music) – guest Stefano Di Battista
- 2005 – Tribute to Bud Powell (Map)
- 2007 – Be Bop Club (Primrose Music)

=== Collaborations ===
- 1994 – The Best Live – Sergio Coppotelli quintet (Splash)
- 1995 – A Sentimental Journey – Iolanda Zignani (Louis Farrenc)
- 2000 – Suite For Cello & Jazz Piano Trio – Claude Bolling (Isma Record)
- 2012 – Eclectic Taste – Sergio Coppotelli (Alfa Music)
- 2015 – Suite N. 2 for Flute and Jazz Piano Trio – Claude Bolling (Black Window Rec.)
