= Zum zum zum - La canzone che mi passa per la testa =

- Directed by: Bruno Corbucci
- Written by: Mario Amendola; Bruno Corbucci; Luciano Ferri
- Starring: Little Tony; Isabella Savona; Orietta Berti; Peppino De Filippo
- Cinematography: Fausto Zuccoli
- Edited by: Luciano Anconetani
- Music by: Willy Brezza
- Release date: 1969
- Running time: 102 minutes
- Country: Italy
- Language: Italian

Zum zum zum - La canzone che mi passa per la testa is 1969 film directed by Bruno Corbucci.

== Plot ==
The sons of a music-loving insurance broker take extreme measures to find happiness for themselves and others, with the help of the power of music.

== Cast ==
- Little Tony as Tony Bertozzini
- Isabella Savona as Rosalia Caputo
- Orietta Berti as Sister Teresa
- Peppino De Filippo as Peppino Bertozzini
- Walter Brugiolo as Carletto Bertozzini
- Paolo Panelli as Paolo
- Nino Terzo as Filiberto Caputo
- Dolores Palumbo as Tosca Bertozzini
- Vittorio Congia as Vittorio
- Enzo Cannavale as Filippo
- Enrico Montesano as Enrico aka Camomilla
- Luca Sportelli as Sor Ignazio
- Mario Meniconi as Enrico's father
- Enzo Guarini as Luigino Monticelli
- Giacomo Furia as Pasquale
- Dante Cleri as florist
- Lino Banfi as doorman
- Bruno Canfora as himself
- Pippo Baudo as himself
- Daniela Ghibli as herself
- Mirella Pamphili as Mariana
- Valeria Sabel as Miss Vincenzi
- Gianfranco D'Angelo as party guest

== Sequel ==
The film was followed by a sequel, Zum zum zum n° 2.

== Response ==
An Italian review of the time described the film as ”an unpretentious work, whose thin plot is a mere pretext for the songs performed by the protagonists’”.
