= Vic Elmes =

British musician (1947–2017)

Vic Elmes (born Victor George Elmes; 10 May 1947, Dagenham, Essex, England – 11 April 2017) played with several groups such as Acid Gallery and The Epics, before helping to form the band Christie in 1970. Christie had several hits: "Yellow River" and "San Bernadino" in 1970, "Man of Many Faces" in 1971, and "Iron Horse" in 1972.

1972 was also the year of Elmes' own creation "Jo Jo's band", the first of the tracks that proved to be South American hit records. In 1973, Elmes left Christie and followed a solo career that brought him other success.

Elmes wrote the guitar parts for the first-season theme of the classic science fiction series Space: 1999 (along with bass player John McCoy and Liam Genockey from the rock band Zzebra) produced and directed by Gerry Anderson, in collaboration with composer Barry Gray, who wrote the incidental music for the first season of the series. Additionally, he composed all of the music for the first-season episode "Ring Around The Moon" in collaboration with music arranger Alan Willis and acted as Music Associate for all 24 episodes of the first season under the name of 'Vic Elms'. He also composed the score for the British sex comedy The Ups and Downs of a Handyman in 1975.

Elmes continued touring and played music with his own band, Christie Again. His last album, Christie Again All The Hits and More (Generate Records/MCP) under the management of Garrelt Danker, has sold many copies in Europe and features old hits (such as the previously unreleased in Europe "Jo Jo's band") plus newer tracks.

This latter album also featured a new 'Christie' member, Lorenzo Gabanizza, who is the author of two of the songs from the album.

Elmes died on 11 April 2017, at the age of 69.
