= The Seducers =

- Italian film poster
- Directed by: Ottavio Alessi
- Screenplay by: Ottavio Alessi; Lorenzo Ricciardi; Uncredited: Nelda Minucci
- Story by: Lorenzo Ricciardi
- Produced by: Franco Cancellieri
- Starring: Maud de Belleroche; Maurizio Bonuglia; Edwige Fenech; Ruggero Miti; Rosalba Neri; Salvatore Puntillo; Eva Thulin
- Cinematography: Alessandro D'Eva
- Edited by: Luciano Anconetani
- Music by: Sante Maria Romitelli
- Production company: A.I.C.A. Cinematografica
- Distributed by: Cineriz
- Release date: 1969
- Running time: 99 minutes
- Country: Italy
- Language: Italian

The Seducers (Italian: Top Sensation, also known as Swinging Young Seductresses) is a 1969 Italian erotic drama film co-written and directed by Ottavio Alessi and starring Maud de Belleroche, Maurizio Bonuglia, Edwige Fenech, Rosalba Neri and Eva Thulin.

== Plot ==
The beautiful prostitute Ulla (Edwige Fenech) is hired by the despicable Mudy (Maud de Belleroche) and invited on a sea cruise where Ulla is meant to take the virginity of Mudy's son Tony, a shy and mentally disabled 20-year-old with a tendency toward pyromania. Also invited on the cruise are the provocative Paula (Rosalba Neri) and her husband Aldo (Bonuglia), who are constantly striving to win the favor of a wealthy woman in hope of obtaining an oil concession. Despite her efforts, Ulla has no effect on the young man until the yacht stops on a Mediterranean island inhabited only by a goat herder and his wife, Beba (Eva Thulin). Tony is attracted to her, but little by little his mental disorders arise, and the story ends in tragedy.

== Cast ==
- Rosalba Neri as Paola
- Edwige Fenech as Ulla
- Eva Thulin as Beba
- Maud de Belleroche as Mudy
- Maurizio Bonuglia as Aldo
- Ruggero Miti as Tony
- Salvatore Puntillo as Andro
