= Zum zum zum nᵒ 2 =

- Directed by: Bruno Corbucci
- Starring: Peppino De Filippo; Little Tony; Lino Banfi
- Release date: 1969
- Country: Italy
- Language: Italian

Zum zum zum nᵒ 2 is a 1969 musicarello film directed by Bruno Corbucci. It is the sequel to the film Zum zum zum - La canzone che mi passa per la testa.

== Plot ==
Tony, who is to marry Rosalia, falls in love with the beautiful Valeria and chaos ensues.

== Cast ==
- Little Tony as Tony
- Isabella Savona as Rosalia
- Dolores Palumbo as Tosca
- Paolo Panelli as Omino Col Singhiozzo
- Peppino De Filippo as Peppino Bertozzini
- Eva Thulin as Valeria
- Orietta Berti as Suor Teresa
- Walter Brugiolo as Carletto Bertozzini
- Enzo Cannavale as Filippo
- Nino Terzo as Filiberto Caputo
- Carlo Delle Piane as Nando
- Stelvio Rosi as Gianni
- Elvira Tonelli as Donna Laura
- Valeria Sabel as Stefania
- Luca Sportelli as Sor Ignazio
- Lino Banfi as Pasquale
- Pippo Baudo as himself
- Bruno Canfora as himself

== Reception ==
The film received poor critical response. A review from Avvenire described the film as "a cloying alternation of ditties, sentimental intrigues, and comic sketches" in which "a reassuring cartoonish banality triumphs on all fronts". An Italian review of the time found the screenplay "elementary” and the filming and acting ’”inappropriate” Paolo Mereghetti described the film as "very weak", with Little Tony not credible in his role and a certain repetitiveness of situations already shown in the first film.
