= Pippo Baudo =

Italian television presenter (1936–2025)

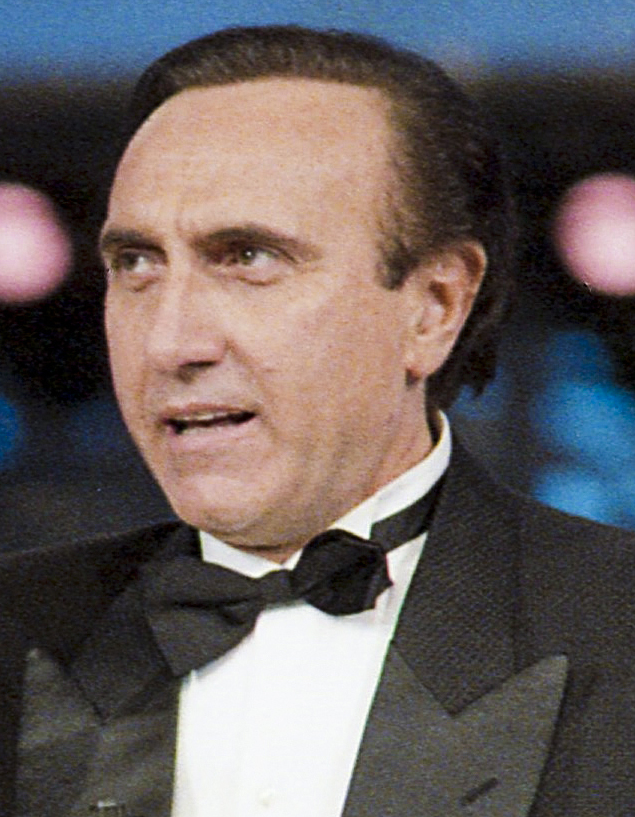
- Baudo in 1987
- Born: Giuseppe Raimondo Vittorio Baudo; 7 June 1936; Militello in Val di Catania, Italy
- Died: 16 August 2025 (aged 89); Rome, Italy
- Occupations: Television presenter; television producer; screenwriter
- Years active: 1959–2022
- Spouse(s): Angela Lippi (m. 1970; div. 1975) Katia Ricciarelli (m. 1986; div. 2007)

Giuseppe Raimondo Vittorio "Pippo" Baudo (7 June 1936 – 16 August 2025) was an Italian television presenter. One of the most notable in his native country, he had a career spanning six decades, which included 13 editions of the Sanremo Music Festival – the highest number for a single presenter.

Baudo was often nicknamed "Superpippo" (referencing the Italian name of Super Goof). Baudo was also the artistic director and president of the Teatro Stabile di Catania from 2000 to 2007.

== Career ==
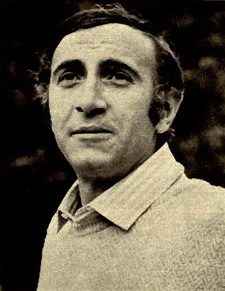
Baudo in 1975

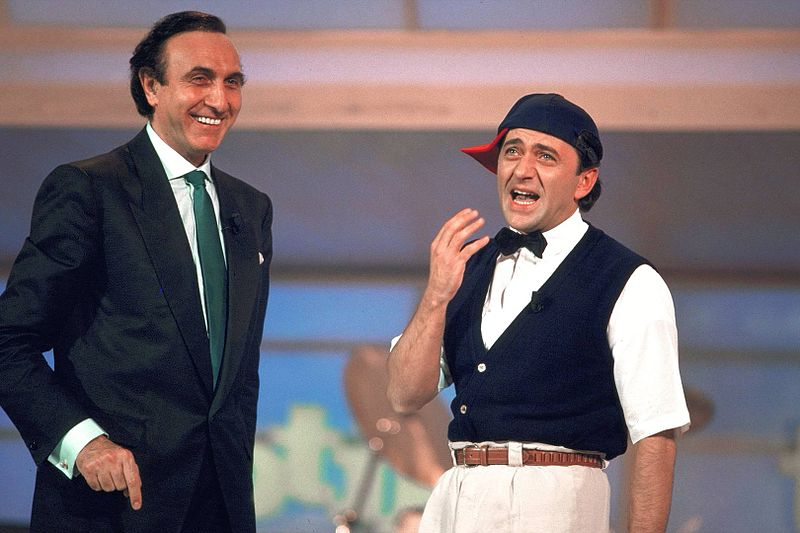
Baudo with Giorgio Faletti at Sanremo 1987

Baudo was born in Militello in Val di Catania, Sicily, the son of a lawyer and a housewife. While studying law at the University of Catania, he started performing as an actor and presenter, becoming the sidekick of comedian Tuccio Musumeci. He graduated with a degree in law, despite his interest in entertainment, and never practiced as a lawyer. At the end of the 1950s, he became a singer and pianist for Orchestra Moonlight. In 1959, for the first time, Pippo appeared on Italian TV during an episode of the Enzo Tortora's show La conchiglia d'oro. He had his breakout in 1966, as the presenter of the musical show Settevoci.

In 1968, Baudo hosted the Sanremo Music Festival for the first time; he eventually hosted the festival 13 times, the last one in 2008, also serving as artistic director in numerous editions. On the opening night of the Sanremo Music Festival 1995, shortly after the beginning of the show a man, Pino Pagano, climbed onto of the gallery of the Teatro Ariston threatening to commit suicide by jumping; he was persuaded to step back by Baudo himself amid the applause of the audience. He also hosted two editions of Canzonissima, six editions of Un disco per l'estate, as well as numerous editions of Domenica in and Fantastico.

Beyond his main activity as a television presenter, Baudo served as artistic director of the Teatro Stabile di Catania from 1989 al 1997, and as its president from 2000 to 2007. He was also a songwriter; among his best known compositions were Nino Ferrer's "Donna Rosa", Gianni Morandi's "Una domenica così", Nino Manfredi's "W le donne", and Sacha Distel's "La quadriglia".

== Personal life and death ==
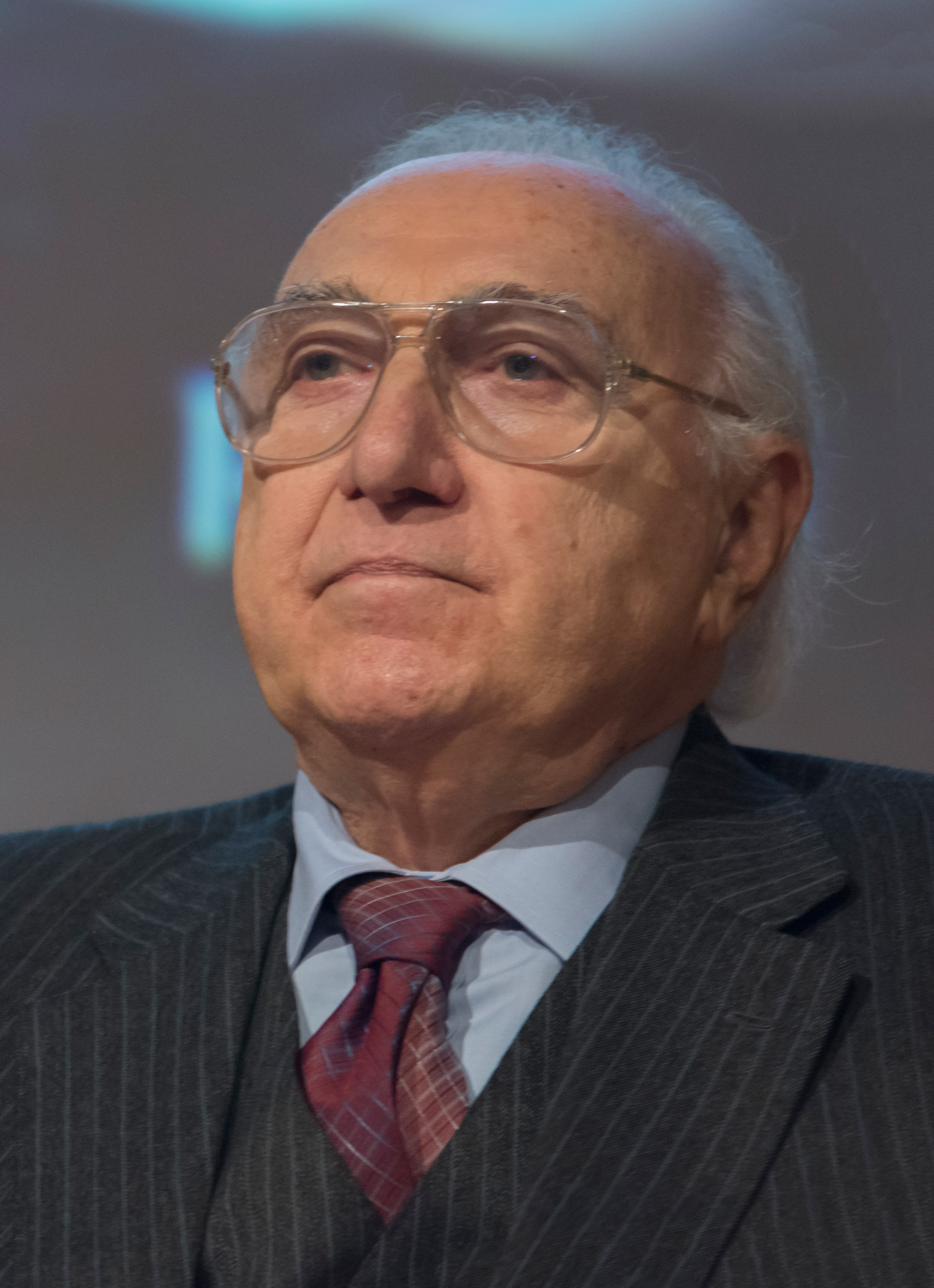
Baudo in 2016

Baudo had two children: Alessandro (1962) with Mirella Adinolfi, and Tiziana (1970) with his first wife Angela Lippi. After relationships with the actresses Alida Chelli and Adriana Russo, between 1986 and 2007 Baudo was married to Italian soprano Katia Ricciarelli (from whom he separated in 2004 before their divorce was finalized). In the 1990s, because of his anti-mafia activism, he suffered three bombings by the Sicilian mafia, one of which destroyed his villa in Santa Tecla.

Baudo died at the Campus Bio-Medico in Rome on 16 August 2025, at the age of 89. His funeral was held in his Sicilian hometown of Militello on 20 August, overseen by the Bishop of Caltagirone. In 2026, a RAI television studio in Saxa Rubra was named after him.

== Acting credits ==
Year	Title	Role(s)	Notes
1968	Zum zum zum - La canzone che mi passa per la testa	Himself	Cameo appearance
1969	Zum zum zum n° 2	Himself	Cameo appearance
1969	Il suo nome è Donna Rosa	Duke Pippo	
1970	W le donne	Colonel Bertoluzzi	
1980	Delitto in via Telauda	Himself	Television film
1981	L'esercito più pazzo del mondo	Himself	Cameo appearance
1982	Casa Cecilia	The presenter	Episode: "Un genio in famiglia"
1983	"FF.SS." – Cioè: "...che mi hai portato a fare sopra a Posillipo se non mi vuoi più bene?"	Himself	Cameo appearance
1985	I Am an ESP	Himself	Cameo appearance
1990	I promessi sposi	Pennellone	TV series; main role
1993	Anni 90: Parte II	Himself	Cameo appearance
2004	Come inguaiammo il cinema italiano - La vera storia di Franco e Ciccio	Himself	Documentary film
2010	L'ultimo gattopardo: Ritratto di Goffredo Lombardo	Himself	Documentary film
2011	All at Sea	Himself	Cameo appearance

== Honours ==
- Italy: Knight Grand Cross of the Order of Merit of the Italian Republic (21 July 2021)

== Place of interest ==
The community of Militello in Val di Catania decided to dedicate a big mural to Pippo Baudo that is located on Via Guglielmo Marconi, right in front of the Tempio Cinema Theater.
