= Earthbound (Space: 1999) =

- Space: 1999 episode
- Episode no.: Series 1 Episode 22
- Directed by: Charles Crichton
- Written by: Anthony Terpiloff
- Editing by: Mike Campbell
- Production code: SP 5
- Original air date: 25 August 1975

Guest appearances
- Roy Dotrice as Commissioner Simmonds; Christopher Lee as Captain Zantor; Andrew Dempsey as Main Mission Operative; Tony Allyn as Security Guard 1 (Tony); Quentin Pierre as Security Guard 2; Barbara Kelly as Computer Voice

Episode chronology
← Previous "Another Time, Another Place"	Next → "Ring Around the Moon"

"Earthbound" is the 22nd episode of the first series of Space: 1999. The screenplay was written by Anthony Terpiloff; the director was Charles Crichton. The final shooting script is undated. Live-action filming took place Friday 15 March 1974 through Monday 1 April 1974.

The episode first aired in Australia on 25 August 1975. In the UK, it was first broadcast on 4 December 1975.

== Plot ==
A spacecraft is approaching Moonbase Alpha. With no reply to hails, Commander Koenig orders the Eagle squadron to intercept. Suddenly the craft dives towards the lunar surface. Its retrorockets fire late and it soft-impacts near Alpha.

Docking with the damaged craft, an Eagle party led by Koenig and Dr Russell discover that it contains six immobile humanoids in transparent pods. The aliens show no metabolic activity, leading the Alphans to presume they have been killed. When Russell breaks the seal on one of the pods, an energy discharge incinerates its occupant. The aliens, revealed to have been in stasis, leave their pods and surround the Alphans. Koenig and Russell apologise, and the aliens accept that the death was an accident and guide the Alphans in a funerary ritual.

Monitoring from Alpha is Simmonds, the World Space Commissioner who was stranded on the Moon when it broke out of Earth orbit. Unwilling to accept his new life, Simmonds has insisted the Alphans use every means at their disposal to get back to Earth.

The aliens are Kaldorians, an ancient and pacifistic race. When their planet was dying, their people dispatched survival ships to other habitable worlds. This party were bound for Earth and have been travelling for 350 years. Their ship was programmed to orbit the Moon to allow them to wake before landing on Earth. However, the Moon's departure from the Solar System caused them to crash. If they are welcome on Earth, they will settle there; if not, they will kill themselves.

As the Kaldorians repair their ship, their leader, Zantor, has its computer plot a new 75-year course to Earth. He offers the free stasis chamber to one of the Alphans, for whom the computer will need to compile a physiological matrix. Koenig programs Alpha's computer to select one person to go home.

Simmonds declares himself the obvious choice: he has no function on Alpha. Koenig insists that the decision will be impartial, but Simmonds refuses to have his fate decided by a lottery. Taking a laser gun, he stuns Alpha's power plant personnel and disconnects an energy converter, causing system failures throughout Alpha. Unless he is given passage to Earth, he will let Alpha freeze. Zantor agrees to be Simmonds' hostage in exchange for the converter. Power is restored and Simmonds escorts Zantor onto the ship at gunpoint. He has the Kaldorians enter stasis first, not knowing that his matrix is still required. The ship blasts off.

Three hours later, Alpha receives a signal. It is Simmonds, who has woken prematurely in his stasis chamber and is trying to call Earth, believing the journey over. Unable to break out of his chamber or rouse the Kaldorians, he is horrified to discover that Earth is still decades away. Alpha cannot help: the ship is beyond the range of the Eagles. With no way to re-enter stasis, Simmonds collapses in what has proven to be his tomb.

The Alphans wonder whether it was an oversight by Simmonds or Kaldorian justice. Koenig and Russell reflect on the irony of the situation when Koenig reveals the computer's selection for the journey home: Simmonds.

== Regular cast ==
- Martin Landau as Commander John Koenig
- Barbara Bain as Dr Helena Russell
- Barry Morse as Professor Victor Bergman
- Prentis Hancock as Controller Paul Morrow
- Clifton Jones as David Kano
- Zienia Merton as Sandra Benes
- Anton Phillips as Dr Bob Mathias
- Nick Tate as Captain Alan Carter
- Suzanne Roquette as Tanya Alexander (uncredited)

== Production ==
Christopher Lee had recently completed his role as million-dollar assassin Francisco Scaramanga in the ninth James Bond film The Man With the Golden Gun when he came aboard as the noble alien Captain Zantor. Lee was famous on both sides of the Atlantic for his portrayal of the Frankenstein monster and Count Dracula in his many Hammer Films appearances.

Production designer Keith Wilson was responsible for the hair, makeup and costume design for the first series. When creating the Kaldorians, Wilson envisioned the bridges of their noses being built up with appliances to render a flat plane from nose to forehead. Christopher Lee objected to the uncomfortable makeup—especially when its removal also removed a layer of skin from the involved area. This was also the first time Lee, standing six feet four inches tall, was asked to stand on an 'apple box' to increase his height: the aliens were envisioned as being at least six-foot-six.

Responding to complaints from directors and cameramen regarding the difficulty they experienced shooting on the Main Mission set, Wilson made a major modification prior to this episode. Originally, the set was designed with a platform running along three sides, giving the operations area a 'sunken' effect. The platform and steps were removed from one side, opposite the computer-bank wall. The four windows there were placed on the studio floor and, being 'wild' (i.e. movable), allowed for greater camera access. Wilson also broke up the tight formation of desks, improving the traffic flow through the room.

=== Music ===
The score was re-edited from previous Space: 1999 incidental music tracks composed for the first series by Barry Gray and draws primarily from "Breakaway" and "Black Sun".

== Reception ==
John Kenneth Muir considered "Earthbound" to be a standout episode as well as the first episode after the series premiere to "hit all the notes it strives for". He described it as "a resounding success in writing, performance, and particularly in resolution".

According to TV Zone magazine, "Earthbound" is one of the series' "most enjoyable episodes" and "[characterises] all which is best in the series". Arguing that the only weakness is the "very 1970s" production and costume design, it especially praised Crichton's direction and Lee and Dotrice's performances. According to Radio Times, with "Earthbound" Dotrice "provided fans with an unforgettable episode of the show."

Rating the episode 9 out of 10, Dreamwatch Bulletin described it as "quite superb in almost every respect", with "very tight and well paced" writing. James O'Neill gave it 3 out of 4 stars, commenting that "even with the silly face paint makeup, Lee makes this worth watching." SciFiNow magazine rated the episode 3 out of 5.

Journalist and Space: 1999 fan Shaqui Le Vesconte praised the casting against type of Lee, and said the episode "delivers a twist ending with considerable panache." SFX gave the episode an "A" rating and also praised the ending, calling it "one of the best moments" in TV science fiction. A later article by the same magazine stated that "[t]here are few moments in science fiction as chillingly, logically horrific as the conclusion of 'Earthbound'."

== Novelisation ==
The character of Commissioner Simmonds was killed off by E. C. Tubb in the first Space: 1999 novel Breakaway. As author Brian Ball was unable to rework the story without the scheming politician, "Earthbound" was withdrawn from its intended place in the third Year One Space: 1999 novel The Space Guardians. Ball incorporated certain elements into his adaptation of "Missing Link": Raan's illusory Victor Bergman was given the avaricious intention of seizing an alien ship to travel home.

In 2003, the story was novelised by Tubb and released in Space: 1999 – Earthbound. Minor additions to the story include: (1) As to not violate the novels' continuity, it is stated that Simmonds was left for dead in the confusion of the breakaway, but was resuscitated by Bob Mathias. His broken neck and fractured skull were repaired and the weeks spent recovering in Medical explained his absence; (2) The Kaldorians were found to emit pheromones that make people like them, explaining the instant acceptance of the aliens by Koenig and his boarding party.
