= Lucifera: Demon Lover =

- Directed by: Paolo Lombardo
- Screenplay by: Paolo Lombardo
- Produced by: Dick Randall
- Starring: Edmund Purdom; Rosalba Neri; Spartaco Conversi
- Cinematography: Antonino Modica
- Edited by: Francesco Bertuccioli
- Music by: Elvio Monti
- Production company: Nova International Film
- Distributed by: Regional
- Release date: 26 January 1972 (Italy)
- Running time: 79 minutes
- Country: Italy

Lucifera: Demon Lover (Italian: L'amante del demonio) is a 1972 Italian horror film. It depicts a trio of young women who go to a centuries-old castle where the devil is rumored to live. One of the women goes to sleep and wakes up a few centuries earlier, where a sinister figure in a red hood follows her everywhere.

Described by film critic and historian Roberto Curti as "one of the most obscure Italian Gothic horror films of the decade".

== Cast ==
- Edmund Purdom as Gunther
- Rosalba Neri as Helga
- Spartaco Conversi as Johan
- Robert Woods as Helmuth
- Maria Teresa Pietrangeli as Magda
- Nando Poggi as Hans

== Production ==
Lucifera: Demon Lover was shot in early 1971 at Castello Ruspoli in Vignanello and S.C.O. Studios in Rome. Rosalba Neri recollection of the director was that he "couldn't stay awake for more than two hours" and that he "looked as if he was near his end, from the way he walked and moved around. I think he must have been very ill..." Curti commented that Neri's recollection was puzzling as the director was only in his forties when the film was made.

According to actor Robert Woods, Lombardo was replaced by him stating that "Harry Cushing felt the movie was incomplete and needed to be improved upon, and that is why I was hired to 'finish it.' Needless to say, it was without credit and I did a small part in it as well. The direction I did for Harry was all in all around Rome and I have to admit, other than the dailies, I didn't see the finished product." Assistant director Marco Masi was adamant that Woods did not do any directing on the film itself, but did not recollect anything else about the shooting of the film.

== Release ==
The Italian censorship board demanded 181 meters of the film be cut, specifically to the erotic scenes in the film. Lucifera: Demon Lover was distributed theatrically in Italy on 26 January 1972 by Regional. The film grossed a total of 75,399,000 Italian lire domestically.

A photonovel version of the film appears in issue #43 of Cinesex in July 1971. Roberto Curti noted that the film found some notoriety among genre fans in early heyday of local broadcast television and home video where the film was released by AVO Film label. It was released overseas by the Mya home video label as Lucifera: Demonmlover in what Curti described as a "terrible-looking, fullscreen print". The film was also released with the English title The Devil's Lover.

== Reception ==
In a retrospective review, Curti described the film as a work of "mind-boggling amateurishness". Curti specifically noted cheap production values that were "beyond belief".
