= Maurizio Bonuglia =

Italian actor (1943–2010)

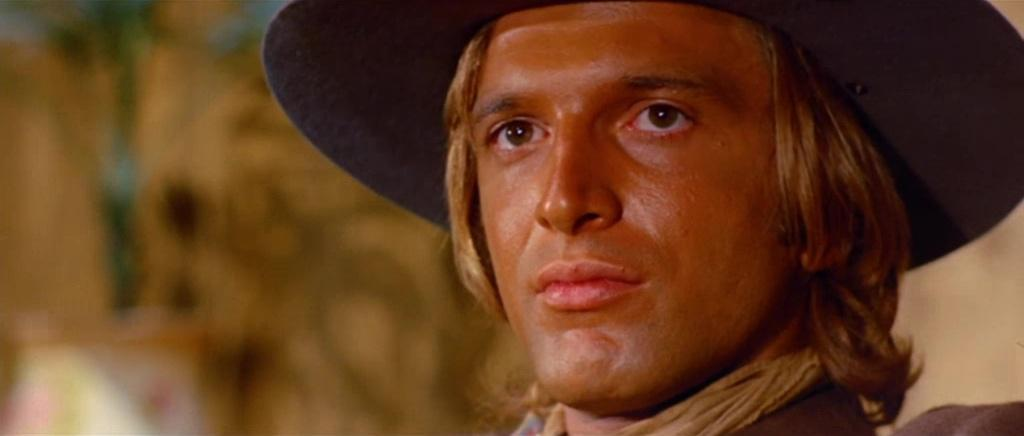
- Bonuglia in The Reward's Yours... The Man's Mine (1969)
- Born: 1943; Rome, Italy
- Died: 2010 (aged 66–67); Rome, Italy
- Occupation: Actor
- Years active: 1967–1997

Maurizio Bonuglia (1943–2010) was an Italian actor. He appeared in more than twenty films from 1967.

== Life and career ==
Born in Rome, Bonuglia started his film career in 1967, playing the leading role in Gianfranco Mingozzi's Trio. In the following years, he was increasingly cast in minor roles, and disillusioned with his career, he retired in 1976, making a brief comeback in the mid-1980s. In 1991, he made his directorial debut with Notti di paura. Bonuglia died in Rome in 2010.

== Selected filmography ==
Year	Title	Role	Notes
1968	The Protagonists	Nino	
1969	The Reward's Yours... The Man's Mine	Dolph	
1969	Detective Belli	Mino Fontana	
1969	The Seducers	Aldo	
1970	Le Mans, Shortcut to Hell	Dustin Rich	
1970	Splendori e miserie di Madame Royale	Pino Rinotti	
1971	The Fifth Cord	John Lubbock	
1972	The Weapon, the Hour & the Motive	Don Giorgio	
1973	Brothers Blue	Frank Blue	
1973	Ludwig	Mayer	
1973	Woman Buried Alive	Ferdinand	
1974	The Perfume of the Lady in Black	Roberto	
1974	The Kiss	Guido Rambaldi	
1976	House of Pleasure for Women	Gualtiero	
