= Lorenzo Gabanizza =

Italian musician

Lorenzo Gabanizza (born December 8, ? in Verona, Italy) is a musician, composer, singer and songwriter.

== Career ==
He was a member of various groups, especially from 1991, where he met Donovan, being enclosed on his staff. He then headed a Queen cover band called Mantras, with which he toured Europe. His "Queen project" continued with his band The Slightly Mad. Gabanizza started a fund-raising program to help fight AIDS that was recognized by the Mercury Phoenix Trust, the organization that was founded soon after Freddie Mercury's death.

In 2004, Gabanizza became a member of the Vic Elmes band Christie Again. He wrote the song "Meet me at the river" that became a success and featured in the album Christie Again all the hits and more.

In 2007, Gabanizza tried a solo career. His first album, Du bist meine welt, was not successful as expected under the management of Garrelt Danker.

In 2013, Gabanizza released an album of Queen covers, featuring his own composition Freddie Still lives, the royalties of which were donated to the Mercury Phoenix Trust.

In 2016, Gabanizza produced and recorded a self-penned album, Celtic Bridge (Italian way music), a concept album sold well both in Europe and the United States, entering the American download charts top 100. In Germany, Gabanizza was seen as a fresh pop/Celtic rock style singer, and was compared to great artists as U2 or Angelo Branduardi. Gabanizza's version of "Danny Boy" that was featured on the album gained him a place on the list of best Celtic performers in Italy. In July he appeared in front of 12,000 people at the worldwide event Celtica among others such as Vincenzo Zitello, Katia Zunino, and Celkilt.

His latter album, Roses in the sky, received good reviews in Italy and entered the download charts having mentions and airplay from Italy to Texas. The album included, Stefano Guidi, Luca Gabanizza, Beppe Peracchi, vocalist Isabel and Max Gabanizza and credits the Yvor Novello recipient Jeff Christie in an advisory capacity. The band toured with Chuck Berry, Cristiano de André, New Era Mogol and others.

In 2017, he released a single, "Feeding the Waves of War," a protest song against Trump's administration, under the management of John Toso which features on Nobel nominee David Swanson's website.

In January 2018, he released a single, "Demons", which enclose a cover of the Linkin Park song "One more light", and donates all the royalties to the 320 change direction, founded by Chester's Bennington widow Talinda Bennington.

During summer 2018, he was injured in a terrible traffic accident, which forced him to suspend the works of his album "Out of darkness" which features musicians such as Robby Pellati (Ligabue's drummer), Max Gabanizza (Mauro Pagani's bass player), Luca Marcìas (Antonella Ruggiero's guitar player). The mastering of the album is handled by Grammy recipient and multiplatinum L.A. based engineer Don Tyler, who worked among the others with Bob Dylan, Pink Floyd, Rolling Stones, Neil Diamond etc.

In February 2019 he got back to work and released another single "I am wrong" which comes along with a cover of Linkin Park's "The messenger" and reached 69th on the European top 100 indie charts. In June, he released a single "Come Back to me", which features musician and producer Craig Levy.

In November of the same year, Lorenzo releases a new single, "Straight to the heart" with the same musicians of the album "Out of darkness" and the Mastering by Don Tyler. The single suddenly entered the European Country charts reaching #1 and the MTV Usa spotify single at #6. The videoclip of the song, directed by Oscar Serio, starring Lorenzo himself and the actress Martina Sacchetti, topped at 6th place on MTV Usa charts.

The 2020 has a strong start as well for Lorenzo. His Ep, "All the words we never said" suddenly got huge exposure (8th on European Indie Charts, 1th on MTV USA, 48th on Italian indie charts) with Fans from the UK calling on Lorenzo "To head to their shores and perform in well-known venues including the Manchester Academy" On the day of twin towers attacks, September 11, he releases one Ep "Someone waiting at their door", a good success reaching the Number one on the EACM Charts. The title track features Grammy fiddler Ian Cameron . As written by well known Journalist and country music dj Nik Bernitz Pizzigoni on Planet Country:

"In short another great effort from one of Italy’s finest artists and we can certainly say that we leave the musical table, fully fed and incredibly satisfied."

In October 2021, he releases a new single featuring the multi platinum Jeff Christie under the label MTS Records by multi awarded Manager Michael Stover and mastered by Greg Calbi. The song gets terrific press and reaches an impressive list of accolades: #1 in iTunes Country Charts, South Africa; #1 in the European Indie Charts; #4 in the World Indie Charts; #3 in the MTV USA Spotify chart; while the related video clip wins the 4th Golden Wheat Awards, the Toronto Alternative Film Festival and got an official selection at the Munich Music Video Awards, International Music Awards (London) and Malabar Film Festival (India). After the success of their first release, Lorenzo and Jeff decide to release a new single written and composed by Lorenzo himself: "I guess I am the only one". Lorenzo "Encourage many upcoming musicians with the lyrics of the song, as he is urging people to believe in themselves and in their abilities." What also makes this song memorable is that it includes previous members of the band Christie: drummer Paul Fenton and bass guitarist Kevin Moore. The song, reaches #7 in the UK iTunes Charts, #3 in the World Indie Charts and #1 in the European Indie Charts. In 2023, Lorenzo and Jeff release a third single, "I don't want to live without you" which reaches #4 in the UK iTunes Adult contemporary charts. The videoclip, wins multiple awards globally.

In 2024, Lorenzo he's back at work with Jeff Christie again. The new song, "Rainy day Man", is an acoustic ballad with the typical sounds and essentiality of the genre. Released under Robot Distro, digital branch of the Slipknot label Golden Robot Records, and mastered by Peter Maher, engineer for U2 and Rolling Stones, it only further consolidates the success of the Italian-British duo, placing #2 in the Spotify charts in Iceland, #6 in the UK Rock iTunes charts and #1 for two weeks in the European indie chart.

== Discography ==
=== Albums ===
- Christie - all the hits and more - (2004) (with Christie Again)
- Du bist meine welt (2007)
- Freddie Still Lives - (2013) (with The Slightly Mad)
- Celtic Bridge (2016)
- Roses in the Sky(2016)

=== Singles ===
- "Feeding the Waves of War" (2017)
- "Demons" (2018)
- "I am wrong" (2019)
- "Come Back to me" (2019)
- "Straight to the heart" (2019)
- "All the words we never said" (2020)
- "Someone waiting at their door" (2020)
- "The child, the boy, the old man" (2021)
- "The Bard's dream" (2021)
- "You're not there" with Jeff Christie (2021)
- "I guess I am the only one" with Jeff Christie (2022)
- "I don't want to live without you" with Jeff Christie (2023)
- "Rainy day man" with Jeff Christie (2024)
