= Luciana Angiolillo =

Italian actress and model (1925–2014)

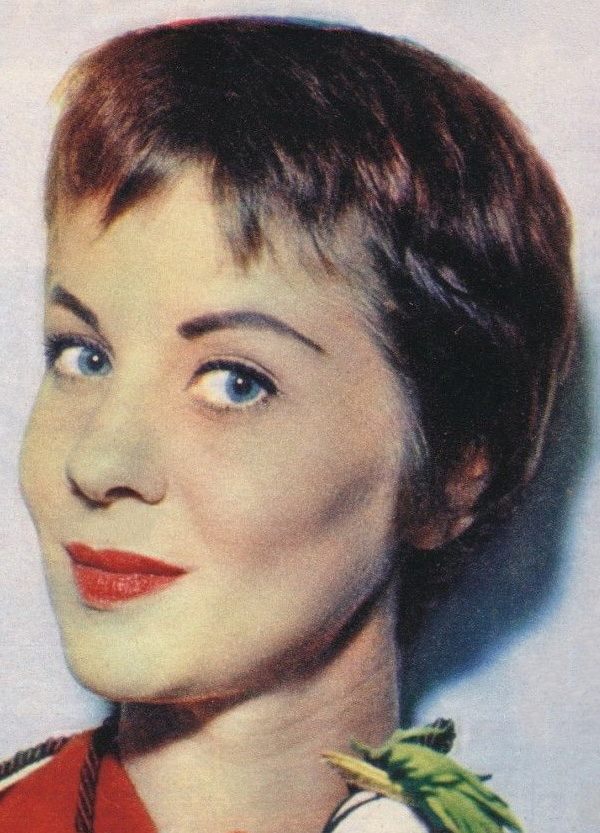
- Angiolillo in 1954
- Born: Luciana Nevi; 22 December 1925; Rome, Kingdom of Italy
- Died: 30 November 2014 (aged 88); Naples, Italy
- Other name: Luciana Angelillo
- Occupation: Actress
- Years active: 1954–1967
- Spouse: Gateano Angiolillo (m. 1947; div. 1958) | Mario Tellini (m. 1959; died 2014)

Luciana Angiolillo (22 December 1925 – 30 November 2014) was an Italian actress and model, known for her career in peplum classic films.

== Life and career ==
Born Luciana Nevi in Rome, Angiolillo started her career as a runway model. She made her film debut thanks to the friendship of Ennio Flaiano, who suggested her to the director Luciano Emmer for the role of an upper class lady in Camilla. From then she appeared in a number of films, often in stereotypal roles of snobbish bourgeois ladies. Gradually relegated to secondary roles, Angiolillo eventually devoted herself to the direction of a fashion house owned by her.

Angiolillo died on November 30, 2014.

== Selected filmography ==
- Camilla (1954)
- A Woman Alone (1956)
- First Love (1959)
- Wild Cats on the Beach (1959)
- Colossus and the Amazon Queen (1960)
- Girl with a Suitcase (1961)
- Hercules and the Conquest of Atlantis (1961)
- The Trojan Horse (1961)
- The Easy Life (1962)
- Alone Against Rome (1962)
- Il sorpasso (1963)
- Love and Marriage (1964)
- Berlin, Appointment for the Spies (1965)
- Countdown to Doomsday (1966)
- Grand Slam (1967)
- The Wild Eye (1967)
