= Alighiero Noschese =

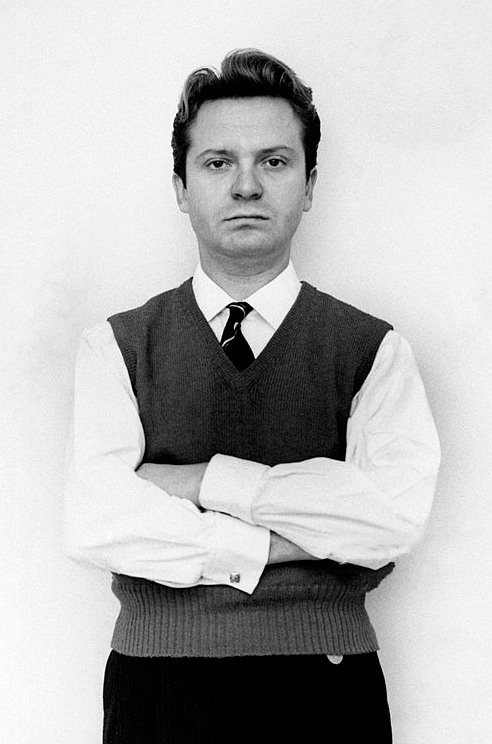
- Noschese in 1962
- Born: 25 November 1932; Naples, Italy
- Died: 3 December 1979 (aged 47); Rome, Italy
- Occupation: Actor

Alighiero Noschese (Italian pronunciation: [aliˈɡjɛːro noˈskeːze, -eːse]; 25 November 1932 – 3 December 1979) was an Italian TV impersonator and actor.

== Life and career ==
Noschese was born in Naples. After an unsuccessful attempt to work as journalist, he debuted for Italian radio as imitator and parodist. After some theatre appearances with Pietro Garinei and Sandro Giovannini, he became popular with the TV show Doppia coppia (1969), where, for the first time in the then wholly state-controlled Italian television, an actor was allowed to parody politicians.

Noschese had an outstanding capability for imitating not only the voice of his subjects, but also their physical features and attitudes. In an interview just before his death, Noschese listed a total of 1,156 voices he had imitated in his career.

On 3 December 1979, at the peak of his career, Noschese shot himself while under care for clinical depression in Rome. However, as firearms and other letal objects are not allowed to depressed patients, it is suspected that someone murdered Noschese or smuggled the gun to him.

== Selected filmography ==
- Doctor Antonio (1954)
- Those Two in the Legion (1962) – Mustafa Abdul Bey
- Obiettivo ragazze (1963) – Giuseppe Quagliarulo
- Scanzonatissimo (1963)
- James Tont operazione U.N.O. (1965) – Noskes
- Mercanti di vergini (1969)
- Io non scappo... fuggo (1970)
- Io non spezzo... rompo (1971) – Riccardo Viganò
- Il furto è l'anima del commercio?!... (1971) – Conte Gaetano Gargiulo
- Io non vedo, tu non parli, lui non sente (1971) – Luigi Gorletti
- Boccaccio (1972) – Lambertuccio De Cecina
- Il terrore con gli occhi storti (1972) – Giacinto Puddu
- The Mighty Anselmo and His Squire (1972) – Il prode Anselmo da Montebello
- The Funny Face of the Godfather (1973) – Don Vito Monreale / Nick Bullione
- Unbelievable Adventures of Italians in Russia (1974) – Antonio Lo Mazzo (final film role)
