= Ring Around the Moon (Space: 1999) =

- Space: 1999 episode
- Episode no.: Series 1 Episode 23
- Directed by: Ray Austin
- Written by: Edward di Lorenzo
- Editing by: Derek Hyde Chambers
- Production code: SP 4
- Original air date: 22 September 1975

Guest appearances
- Max Faulkner as Ted Clifford; Michael Stevens as Man in Corridor; Chai Lee as Anna Wong; Prentis Hancock as Triton Probe Voice

Episode chronology
← Previous "Earthbound"	Next → "Black Sun"

"Ring Around the Moon" is the 23rd episode of the first season of Space: 1999. The screenplay was written by Edward di Lorenzo; the director was Ray Austin. The shooting script is dated 14 December 1973 with green page amendments dated 17 January 1974; the final shooting script is dated 8 February 1974. Live-action filming took place Wednesday 27 February 1974 through Thursday 14 March 1974.

The episode first aired in Australia on 22 September 1975. In the UK, it was first broadcast on 15 January 1976.

== Plot ==
A sphere of light materialises near the Moon and takes over the mind of Alpha technician Ted Clifford. With greatly accelerated reflexes, he operates Main Mission's Computer terminal at incredible speed, then collapses and dies.

The sphere emits a beam of light that encircles the Moon, trapping it in orbit. A voice transmission declares that the Alphans are prisoners of the planet Triton. The probe was using Clifford to disable Alpha's defences, including most of the Eagles. An autopsy reveals that his nervous tissue's processing power had sharply increased and his optic nerve had been altered to function like a high-speed camera. It is concluded that he was being transformed into an organic computer.

Captain Carter and co-pilot Jim Donovan take one of the working Eagles to reconnoitre the sphere. The ship is deflected by a force field and crash-lands near Alpha, killing Donovan and injuring Carter. Commander Koenig and Dr Russell are leading a rescue team onto the lunar surface when Russell is engulfed by a ball of light and disappears. Bergman suspects that the crash was engineered to enable her abduction.

Russell materialises in a void within the sphere. Calling themselves the "eyes of Triton", her captors process her in the same way as Clifford, then return her to Alpha in another ball of light. She is taken to Medical, where tests reveal that she should be blind – even though she can still see. Elsewhere, Bergman discovers references to the "Eyes of Heaven" in the Pyramid Texts. He theorises that these were the Tritonians, and if so, they have been watching humanity for millennia.

A staff conference is interrupted by the Tritonians' activation of Russell. In a trance-like state, she enters Main Mission and starts frantically working Computer, transmitting various system specifications to the sphere. Dr Mathias believes that she will die from her conditioning before she exhausts the memory core.

Using spatial charts, Bergman determines that Triton itself no longer exists. Computer specialist David Kano reports that a brief malfunction in Computer shut down the force field for half a minute. The Alphans realise that Russell and Computer are part of a circuit looping back to the sphere via the force field.

It is decided to sabotage Computer's memory circuits to cripple the force field for the 13 minutes needed to fly an Eagle to the sphere. During this time, Kano will upload the Triton data. Koenig hopes that by proving Triton is no more, the probe will release the Moon.

With Computer and the force field down, Koenig's crew reach the sphere and make contact with the Tritonians, who appear as one-eyed, floating spheres of striated brain tissue. They are studying the Alphans because they fear a human invasion of Triton. Koenig has walked into a trap – the aliens were expecting his arrival and intend to process him like Clifford and Russell.

Computer comes back online and the circuit is restored, allowing Russell to send the Triton data. Forced to accept the loss of their homeworld, the Tritonians choose to destroy themselves. As the sphere begins to disintegrate, the Alphans hurriedly take off for Alpha, clearing the sphere just before it is destroyed in an explosion. Freed from alien control, Russell recovers.

== Regular cast ==
- Martin Landau as Commander John Koenig
- Barbara Bain as Dr Helena Russell
- Barry Morse as Professor Victor Bergman
- Prentis Hancock as Controller Paul Morrow
- Clifton Jones as David Kano
- Zienia Merton as Sandra Benes
- Anton Phillips as Dr Bob Mathias
- Nick Tate as Captain Alan Carter
- Suzanne Roquette as Tanya Alexander (uncredited)

== Production ==
The original concept for this episode, involving UFOs and alien abduction, was one of ten episodes outlines devised for the writers' guide prior to production of "Breakaway". Whether this original concept was conceived by script editor Edward di Lorenzo or whether he adapted the idea is unclear. The ideas presented in the production bear striking resemblances to di Lorenzo's script writing for Mel Welles' Lady Frankenstein, a 1972 attempt to update the Frankenstein myth by adding issues related to gender, ecology and power/knowledge. (Many themes from this movie were reworked into "Ring Around The Moon" and his subsequent stories for the series "Missing Link" and "Alpha Child".)

In the original script, the planet name was Uralt (German for 'ancient'), not Triton. As the theme of the episode is the foundation of science and whether the human condition can be understood from the point of rationality alone, it seems somewhat unclear why they changed from Uralt to Triton. In early drafts, Chief Engineer Smith (or Smitty, as introduced in "Black Sun") is a minor character. He does not appear in the final shooting script, although there is a reference to a Chief Engineer Anderson, which may be an internal joke referring to Gerry Anderson's obsession with technical issues.

In general, the story seems to be about the relationship between power and knowledge, and, to a large extent, appears to be a visualisation of some of Michel Foucault's main writings. The story has a strong visual style with vivid colour and abstract light effects. Some have compared the visual style to the German Expressionist cinema, others have found parallels in the French and Eastern European Theatre of the Absurd. A preproduction painting by Keith Wilson shows a strong 2001: A Space Odyssey influence. From a visual point of view, the episode could perhaps be seen as a paraphrase over the final third of 2001, consisting of the psychedelic "journey through time" sequence and the study of the astronauts M. C. Escher-like reflections on his own self-image.

Ray Austin made his debut as a director on Space: 1999 with this episode. Probably due to having been a stuntman and stunt coordinator before taking up direction, his approach on this particular episode and all later episodes of Space: 1999 has a very clear physical presence. The episode is extremely visual with a lot of movement, contrapunctual to the philosophical and cerebral contents of the story. Austin's style of direction has sometimes been compared to that of Alfred Hitchcock, and throughout Space: 1999 there are a number of quotes to the master. This particular entry has from time to time been compared with Rope (1948).

=== Music ===
An original score was composed for this episode by Vic Elmes and music editor Alan Willis. Against expectations, Elmes (who was producer Sylvia Anderson's son-in-law) thought he could improvise a score with the musicians the day of recording, as he could neither read nor write music. To avoid a walkout, Willis stepped in, hurriedly set some of Elmes' themes down on paper, and conducted the musicians himself. Barry Gray wanted the music to be in the style of Maurice Ravel; Elmes and Willis's final product is more reminiscent of the rock idioms of the day of the bands Deep Purple, Emerson, Lake & Palmer and Yes. A track from the Thunderbirds episode The Mighty Atom can also be heard in the episode.

== Reception ==
According to space1999.net, "Ring Around the Moon" is "generally regarded as one of the lesser first-season episodes". Journalist and Space: 1999 fan Shaqui Le Vesconte agreed, pointing to one scene in particular: "Koenig tries to do a Captain Kirk and use logic to defeat the biological computer, only with such inaccurate astronomical terms, it is a wonder it did not just die laughing." According to Video Watchdog, "[a] slow pace, silly effects [...] and a weak wrap-up make this one of the first season's weakest offerings."

TV Zone considered the episode to be Series 1's worst, describing it as "very much B-movie stuff. Watch this one last." Calling the episode "probably the weakest" of Series 1, John Kenneth Muir questioned how Bergman could know so much about the Tritonians and how Alpha's computer is able to map the cosmos, believing both to be plot holes. However, he praised the story's development of some of the regular characters. Dreamwatch Bulletin rated the episode 3 out of 10, calling it "very bland and forgettable". SciFiNow magazine gave it 2 out of 5, considering it merely "competent". SFX graded it "C-minus", describing it as "just a terribly dull episode".

In a review in the Gerry Anderson-related fanzine Andersonic, Richard Farrell interpreted the plot as a philosophical discussion of the difference between knowledge and wisdom: "the Tritonians merely seek knowledge, whereas the Alphans use the facts they have learned (about Triton in this case) as a means to an end, i.e. saving Helena and escaping." He concluded "The writer's point is alluded to in the epilogue when Victor muses on the Triton probe, 'All that knowledge and yet... perhaps knowledge isn't the answer after all'. Di Lorenzo's answer, perhaps, is being able to accumulate the wisdom to put that knowledge to some use." Although he wrote that "the plot itself is undeniably a little thin", he praised director Ray Austin's "stylised use of sound" and the lighting particularly inside the Tritonian sphere which "imbue the sequences with a sense of tension and atmosphere – the aliens are heard but never seen".

== Novelisation ==
The episode was adapted in the first Year One Space: 1999 novel Breakaway by E.C. Tubb, published in 1975. As with most of his work for the series, Tubb took many liberties with the details of this teleplay. The probe's home of Triton was no longer a planet two million light-years from Earth, but the moon of Neptune, which in this narrative, had gone missing some few years before 1999. Bergman also creates the anti-gravity shield specifically for the purpose of penetrating the Triton ship's forcefield, having gained the knowledge required to perfect the technique from the atomic-waste explosion earlier in the novel. Having been convinced of the demise of its home, the probe chooses to self-destruct—though not before warning the Alphans of their impending encounter with a black sun.
