= James Tont operazione D.U.E. =

1966 film

- Original film poster
- Directed by: Bruno Corbucci
- Written by: Luigi Carpentieri
- Produced by: Luigi Carpentieri; Ermanno Donati
- Starring: Lando Buzzanca
- Cinematography: Alessandro D'Eva
- Music by: Bruno Canfora
- Release date: March 1966
- Running time: 92 minutes
- Countries: France; Italy
- Language: Italian

James Tont operazione D.U.E. or The Wacky World of James Tont is a 1966 spy film spoof based on James Bond's Thunderball and featuring elements predating the release of You Only Live Twice. Directed by Bruno Corbucci, the Eurospy spy-fi comedy adventure is the sequel to James Tont operazione U.N.O. (1965). Lando Buzzanca reprises his role as 00 Agent James Tont, a satire of James Bond and Loris Gizzi as the black monocle-wearing supervillain spoof of Emilio Largo.

Following this film Corbucci wrote a parody of Our Man Flint called Il vostro super agente Flit (1966), directed by Mariano Laurenti.

== Plot ==
After foiling a Soviet break in at the Embassy of the United Kingdom in Moscow, Her Majesty's Secret Service Agent James Tont is invited to speak at an International Secret Agents Convention in Geneva. With apologies read from James Bond for being absent due to his being involved in Operation Thunderball, Tont defends the modern "Supermen of the Secret Service" agents against the more Old Guard of traditional spies and intelligence agents whilst simultaneously evading several Soviet assassination attempts during his speech. Following his well received speech, Tont is tripped by a child spy working with the sister of Mata Hari, an agent of the Old Guard. Tont falls down a flight of stairs incurring a leg injury that leads him to be treated at a health spa.

Another patient present at the health spa is Mr. Spring, the head of the Magnus international food corporation. Unknown to each other, Spring is also the secret head of an unnamed criminal organisation. Spring and Tont become rivals for the romantic attention of Nurse Clarissa with each attempting to injure or kill each other when engaged in their therapeutic treatments. Spring appears to be the winner when Tont is found frozen to death inside an isolation tank that Nurse Clarissa placed him in.

The British Secret Service revives Tont who has only been cryogenically frozen but uses his well publicised death to enable him to infiltrate a criminal scheme to attack an unknown religious centre in a project called "Operazione D.U.E./Operation T.W.O.". The organisation is also attempting to steal components to assemble a powerful weapon called a synchrophasotron.

Tont travels to London disguised as a beatnik named "Bingo Kowalski" in order to infiltrate a group of young hipsters suspected in stealing the first component of the weapon. At the Blue Dolphin discotheque Tont successfully seduces Helen, Spring's agent who has used the beatniks to steal the second component of the weapon. Tont further infiltrates Spring's organisation to take the identity of one of Spring's operatives who replaces an American astronaut. Spring's scheme is for his agent to hijack an American space capsule launched from Cape Kennedy that contains the final element needed to create the synchrophasertron.

Using advanced electronic devices aboard Spring's yacht also named the Blue Dolphin, Tont's space capsule is brought down to be recovered by Spring. Spring and his cohorts pass the time by playing a James Bond board game. Identified by Spring's men, Tont is captured but discovers "Operazione D.U.E." means "Destruction Urbi Eterna", the destruction of the Eternal City; specifically Spring's plan to steal the treasures of the Vatican and destroy St. Peter's Basilica.

== Cast ==
- Lando Buzzanca as James Tont
- France Anglade as Helene
- Loris Gizzi as Mr. Spring
- Claudie Lange as Clarissa
- Antonella Murgia as Samantha
- Jacques Dufilho as Y
- Geoffrey Copleston as Head of Secret Service
- Furio Meniconi as Spring's Henchman
- Aldo Bonamano as KGB spy
- Mirko Valentin as Lopez
- Franco Ressel as Jack Clifford, the spaceman
- Enzo Consoli
- Francesco Sormano as the chairman at the International Spies Congress
- Sara Tonini
- Renato Montalbano as Von Bergen
