= Berlin, Appointment for the Spies =

Berlino - Appuntamento per le spie
- AIP film poster by Reynold Brown
- Directed by: Vittorio Sala
- Written by: Lucio Marcuzzo; Adriano Bolzoni; Romano Ferrara; Adriano Baracco
- Produced by: Fulvio Lucisano
- Cinematography: Fausto Zuccoli
- Music by: Riz Ortolani
- Release date: 1965
- Running time: 85 minutes
- Country: Italy
- Languages: Italian; English

Berlin, Appointment for the Spies (Italian: Berlino - Appuntamento per le spie) is a 1965 Italian Eurospy film directed by Vittorio Sala and starring Dana Andrews. The film is also known as Bang You're Dead.

It was retitled Spy in Your Eye for American International Pictures' American release where it was double billed with Secret Agent Fireball.

== Plot ==
Secret Agent Bert Morris is sent by his superior Colonel Lancaster on a dangerous mission. He must parachute into East Germany to rescue Paula Krauss, the daughter of a now deceased scientist who had successfully developed a death ray and it is believed that Paula has his knowledge of how to create the device. In addition to Morris being up against the Soviets and East Germans, the Red Chinese have entered East Germany to bring back Paula and her knowledge to their homeland.

After seeing off Morris, Colonel Lancaster goes to a clinic to get a state of the art glass eye implanted into his nerves so Lancaster can move the prosthetic eye in a similar fashion to his good eye. What Lancaster doesn't know is that the clinic is run by Communist agents. They have placed a miniature camera into the prosthetic eye that will act like a television camera allowing the Soviets to see what the intelligence chief Colonel Lancaster can see.

== Cast ==
- Brett Halsey as Bert Morris
- Pier Angeli as Paula Krauss
- Dana Andrews as Col. Lancaster
- Gastone Moschin as Boris
- Tania Béryl as Madeleine
- George Wang as Ming
- Alessandro Sperli as Karalis
- Marco Guglielmi as Kurt
- Renato Baldini as Belkeir
- Mario Valdemarin as Willie
- Luciana Angiolillo as Miss Hopkins
- Luciano Pigozzi as Leonida
- Tino Bianchi as Dr. Van Dongen
- Massimo Righi as Lavies
- Franco Beltramme as Serghey
