= The Reward's Yours... The Man's Mine =

1969 film

- Directed by: Edoardo Mulargia
- Written by: Fabrizio Gianni; Ignacio F. Iquino; Edoardo Mulargia; Fabio Piccioni
- Cinematography: Antonio L. Ballesteros
- Music by: Alessandro Alessandroni
- Distributed by: Variety Distribution
- Release date: 1969
- Countries: Italy; Spain
- Language: Italian

The Reward's Yours... The Man's Mine (Italian: La taglia è tua... l'uomo l'ammazzo io, also known as El puro) is a 1969 Italian spaghetti Western film directed by Edoardo Mulargia.

It was shown as part of a retrospective on the spaghetti Western at the 64th Venice International Film Festival.

== Plot ==
El Puro, an alcoholic gunslinger on whom hangs a $10,000 bounty, finds refuge in the home of a saloon dancer, Rosy. Five men go after him to kill him, but the killers kill Rosy, and El Puro finds a way to avenge her.

== Cast ==
- Robert Woods: Joe Bishop 'El Puro'
- Rosalba Neri: Rosie
- Marc Fiorini (credited as Ashborn Hamilton Jr.): Gypsy
- Aldo Berti: Cassidy
- Mario Brega: Tim
- Fabrizio Gianni: Fernando
- Maurizio Bonuglia: Dolph
- Giusva Fioravanti: Antonio
- Angelo Dessy: Charlie
- Attilio Dottesio: Sherriff
- Mariangela Giordano: Babe
- Lisa Seagram: Saloon Owner
