= Vediamoci chiaro =

- Directed by: Luciano Salce
- Cinematography: Danilo Desideri
- Release date: 1984
- Country: Italy
- Language: Italian

Vediamoci chiaro (Let's See It Clear) is a 1984 Italian comedy film directed by Luciano Salce.

The author Enrico Giacovelli referred to the film as "a kind of Scent of a Woman but more ambiguous, midway between Luigi Pirandello's Henry IV and The Late Mattia Pascal".

== Cast ==
- Johnny Dorelli: Alberto Catuzzi
- Eleonora Giorgi: Eleonora Bauer
- Janet Agren: Geneviève
- Giacomo Furia: Peppino
- Angelo Infanti: Gianluca
- Milly D'Abbraccio: Monique
- Geoffrey Copleston: Mercalli
