= Io non spezzo... rompo =

1971 Italian comedy film

- Film poster
- Directed by: Bruno Corbucci
- Produced by: Dino De Laurentiis
- Starring: Alighiero Noschese
- Cinematography: Luciano Tovoli
- Edited by: Tatiana Casini Morigi
- Music by: Gianni Ferrio
- Release date: 21 January 1971
- Running time: 107 minutes
- Country: Italy
- Language: Italian

Io non spezzo... rompo is a 1971 Italian comedy film directed by Bruno Corbucci. It was shown as part of a retrospective on Italian comedy at the 67th Venice International Film Festival.

== Cast ==
- Alighiero Noschese - Riccardo Viganò
- Enrico Montesano - Attilio Canepari
- Janet Agren - Carla Viganò
- Claudio Gora - Frank Mannata
- Lino Banfi - Zagaria - policeman from Apulia
- Gino Pernice - Policeman from Liguria
- Anna Campori - Elena - wife of Riccardo
- Giacomo Furia - Policeman from Naples
- Gordon Mitchell - Joe il Rosso
- Ignazio Leone - Mazzetti
- Mario Donatone - Tony Cupiello
