= Camilla (1954 film) =

- Directed by: Luciano Emmer
- Written by: Luciano Emmer; Ennio Flaiano; Franco Cristaldi
- Produced by: Franco Cristaldi
- Cinematography: Gábor Pogány
- Music by: Carlo Innocenzi
- Release date: 1954
- Country: Italy

Camilla is a 1954 Italian comedy-drama film directed by Luciano Emmer.

== Plot ==
Camilla Busin, a middle-aged Venetian widow, arrives in Rome to take up service as a maid for the Rossetti family, consisting of Mario, a health care physician, his wife Giovanna and their children Andrea and Cristina. The economic conditions of the Rossetti are not prosperous and this causes tensions and disagreements.

Furthermore, the Rossettis hang out with Gianni, an intrusive, rude family friend who is often involved in unclear affairs, who lives without being married with the succubus Donatella. Mario tries to advance his career by preparing an exam to obtain a more remunerative qualification, but his studies are listless and are made difficult by family tensions, caused by the difficulty of maintaining the desired standard of living. Camilla, with her discreet but sure presence, also made up of popular wisdom, is an element of cohesion for the family and manages to give serenity especially to children. The family tensions lead Mario to alcohol abuse and to court Paola, an old flame of his revisited after many years, in turn unaware of Gianni's casual approaches towards his wife.

Gianni also offers Mario a new business: the launch of Swiss diet products in Italy. The case seems to help the two when Mario's neighbor asks him for medical intervention due to an illness of her lover, a wealthy Milanese businessman. He declares himself willing to finance the company, but during the banquet that should sanction the agreement with the Swiss producer, and in which the products destined for commerce are served, everyone feels sick. The deal fades miserably.

This failure seems to make everyone find a new serenity. The Rossetti family is convinced to assume a standard of living more suited to their means, Mario breaks off relations with Gianni who finally agrees to marry Donatella. Camilla then decides to stay in Rome, her son gets engaged to a maid who works in the same building. She, too, now seems more inclined to accept the discreet court of a bricklayer of her age who works in a nearby construction site.

== Distribution ==
The films were presented at the Italian Film Festival which took place in London from 25 to 31 October 1954.

== Cast ==
- Gabriele Ferzetti: Dr. Mario Rossetti
- Franco Fabrizi: Gianni
- Luciana Angiolillo: Giovanna Rossetti
- Irène Tunc: Donatella
- Gina Busin: Camilla Busin
- Dina Perbellini: Vicina di casa
