= A Woman Alone (1956 film) =

- Directed by: Vittorio Sala, Ottavio Alessi
- Written by: Ottavio Alessi; Adriano Baracco; Sandro Continenza; Vittorio Sala
- Starring: Eleonora Rossi Drago; Luciana Angiolillo; Ettore Manni
- Cinematography: Aldo Giordani
- Edited by: Renato Cinquini
- Music by: Roberto Nicolosi
- Production company: Maurizio
- Distributed by: ENIC
- Release date: 17 February 1956
- Running time: 105 minutes
- Country: Italy
- Language: Italian

A Woman Alone (Italian: Donne sole) is a 1956 Italian drama film directed by Vittorio Sala and Ottavio Alessi assistant director, and starring Eleonora Rossi Drago, Luciana Angiolillo and Ettore Manni.

== Cast ==
- Eleonora Rossi Drago as Luisa
- Luciana Angiolillo as Nice
- Ettore Manni as Giulio, il giornalista
- Antigone Costanda as Franca
- Gianna Maria Canale as Mara
- Paolo Stoppa
- Evi Maltagliati as Pressenda
- Joseph Lenzi as Dino Franceschi
- Ignazio Leone as Turi
- Francesco Sormano
- Matilde Orsini
- Vittorio Vaser
- Gino Buzzanca
- Giorgio Gandos
- Franca Ferrari
- Francisco Prosperi
- Ugo Ugolini
- Enzo Garinei as Ciccio, il fotografo
- Ottavio Alessi as the movie Cinematographer

== Bibliography ==
- Lino Miccichè. Storia del cinema italiano: 1954-1959. Edizioni di Bianco & Nero, 2001.
