= James Tont operazione U.N.O. =

1965 film

- A Spanish film poster.
- Directed by: Bruno Corbucci; Giovanni Grimaldi
- Written by: Giovanni Grimaldi; Bruno Corbucci
- Produced by: Luigi Carpentieri; Ermanno Donati
- Starring: Lando Buzzanca
- Cinematography: Alessandro D'Eva; Raffaele Masciocchi
- Music by: Marcello Giombini
- Release date: 1965
- Countries: France; Italy
- Language: Italian

James Tont operazione U.N.O. or Operation Goldsinger is a 1965 Eurospy film spoof based on James Bond's Goldfinger. Co-written and co-directed by Bruno Corbucci and Giovanni Grimaldi, the film stars Lando Buzzanca as James Tont Agent 007 1/2, a parody of James Bond, and Loris Gizzi as Erik Goldsinger, a parody of Auric Goldfinger. A sequel, James Tont operazione D.U.E., was released in 1966.

== Plot ==
James Tont (from Italian tonto, "dumb"), Agent 007 1/2 of Her Majesty's Secret Service is sent to Trinidad where he recovers microfilm concealed inside an enemy agent. After performing surgery to remove the microfilm and the enemy agent's inflamed appendix, Tont is ordered to Las Vegas to contact CIA Agent Tristian Rider for further instructions. Prior to meeting Rider, Tont meets music producer Erik Goldsinger, one of the wealthiest men in the world. Seeing that Goldsinger wins at the crap table by using loaded dice, Tont defeats Goldsinger by outcheating him; altering the spots on a die from three to two. Goldsinger if further humiliated when Tont refuses to give him a chance to win back his money. Goldsinger storms off with his Oriental manservant Kayo crushing the loaded dice in his fist and giving Tont the powdered remnants.

Goldsinger's revenge comes soon. Joyce Patterson, one of Goldsinger's singers and female agents seduces Tont, drugs him and attempts to assassinate him by covering him in gold paint that proves non fatal when she fails to cover his body completely. The golden Tont is discovered by Tristian Rider who informs Tont that his mission is to investigate Goldsinger.

Rider sends Tont to New York City to obtain information from Barbara Ray, CIA Agent SOS 112 who is secretly working for Goldsinger as a musical director. To avoid suspicion she tests Tont as a singer by having him sing on a film clip. Listening to Tont's recording in his office, Goldsinger is ready to sign the talented Tont. When viewing the musical film he recognises Tont as the man who defeated him at the gambling tables. Goldsinger becomes enraged that Tont is not dead. He punishes Joyce by sending her to be disciplined in Hong Kong and attempts to assassinate Tont by sending him to a studio that has a lowered ceiling that will crush Tont. Tont is rescued by CIA Agent SOS 117, an intrepid white mouse who is also a ventriloquist.

Tont is dispatched back to London where his chief briefs him on the incomplete details of Operation April Fool/UNO (United Nations Organisation) gathered from the recovered microfilm. Goldsinger is employed by Red China to use his international music corporation to destroy by unknown means the Headquarters of the United Nations in New York in retaliation for Red China being refused entry. Warning Tont that 007 3/4 will replace him if Tont wastes time or fails, Tont is sent to pursue Goldsinger to his headquarters in Italy to discover his plans to attack the United Nations building. In order to blend in with the population, Tont is given the identity of Giacomino Tontonati and a Fiat 500 D equipped with a multitude of secret weapons and special devices. Tont's third encounter with Goldsinger will affect the entire world.,

== Cast ==
- Lando Buzzanca as James Tont Agent 007 1/2 aka Giacomino Tontonati
- Evi Marandi as Barbara Ray Agent SOS 112
- Loris Gizzi as Erik Goldsinger
- George Wang as Kayo
- Gina Rovere as Narda, Goldsinger's girl
- Susanna Clemm as Austrina
- Evi Rigano as Joyce Patterson
- Walter Maestosi as Tristian Rider
- Geoffrey Copleston as Secret Service Director (uncredited)
- Licia Lombardi as Miss Lollypound
- Marina Morgan (uncredited)
- Roland Bartrop as "Z" Agent (uncredited)
- Franco Ressel as a spy in Trinidad
- Alighiero Noschese
- Corinne Fontaine
- Claudio Guarino
- Bruno Scipioni
- Mario De Simone

== Soundtrack ==
In addition to the parody of specific plot elements and characters from Goldfinger, the film features a spoof variation of John Barry's Shirley Bassey title song. As part of the plot Tont believes that Goldsinger's messages to initiate his scheme are somehow hidden in popular songs, Tont views film clips featuring Gianni Morandi, Pino Donaggio and Valeria Piaggio.

== Reaction ==
During the height of the James Bond mania in 1965, so many Italian films used "007" that United Artists informed the Italian film industry that only James Bond could be 007, and threatened legal action.

Goldsinger was not given an American theatrical release but it was one of a package of twenty English dubbed Continental European films to be shown on American television from August 1966 by the RKO General and Independent Television Corporation In 1967 an American court ruled in favour of United Artists and Danjaq, the producers of the James Bond 007-film series to prevent RKO from screening James Tont – Operation Goldsinger.
