= Maud de Belleroche =

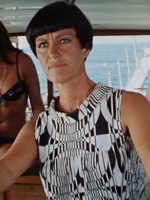
- Maud de Belleroche in The Seducers (1969)
- Born: 26 August 1922; Paris, France
- Died: 19 February 2017 (aged 94)
- Resting place: Villerville, France
- Occupation: Novelist
- Writing career
- Language: French
- Notable work: L'Ordinatrice
- Notable awards: Prix Broquette-Gonin

Maud de Belleroche (née Madeleine Sacquard, 26 August 1922 – 19 February 2017) was a French writer, author of the 1968 best-seller L'Ordinatrice and winner of the 1963 Prix Broquette-Gonin for Cinq personnages en quête d’empereur.

== Filmography ==
- 1969: The Seducers (as Mudy)

== Bibliography ==
- Cinq personnages en quête d’empereur (1962)
- Du dandy au play-boy (1965)
- L'Ordinatrice ? Mémoires d'une femme de quarante ans (1968)
- L'Ordinatrice seconde (1969)
- Des femmes (1970)
- Noisette (1971)
- Eva Perón. La reine des sans chemises (1972)
- Le Ballet des crabes (1975)
- La Murène apprivoisée (1980)
- Oscar Wilde ou l'amour qui n'ose dire son nom, preface of Alain Peyrefitte (1987)
- Sacha Guitry ou l'esprit français (2007)

== Honours and awards ==
- Prix Broquette-Gonin for Cinq personnages en quête d'empereur in 1963
