= Il Sorpasso =

1962 film by Dino Risi

Il sorpasso
- Theatrical release poster
- Directed by: Dino Risi
- Written by: Dino Risi; Ettore Scola; Ruggero Maccari
- Dialogue by: Ettore Scola; Ruggero Maccari
- Produced by: Mario Cecchi Gori
- Starring: Vittorio Gassman; Catherine Spaak; Jean-Louis Trintignant; Claudio Gora; Luciana Angiolillo; Linda Sini
- Cinematography: Alfio Contini
- Edited by: Maurizio Lucidi
- Music by: Riz Ortolani
- Production companies: Fair Film; Incei Film; Sancro Film
- Distributed by: Incei Film
- Release date: 6 December 1962
- Running time: 108 minutes
- Country: Italy
- Language: Italian

Il sorpasso (lit. 'The Overtaking'), also titled The Easy Life in English, is a 1962 Italian road comedy-drama film starring Vittorio Gassman, Catherine Spaak and Jean-Louis Trintignant. Co-written and directed by Dino Risi, it is considered his masterpiece and one of the best examples of the commedia all'italiana film genre. In 2008, the film was included in the Italian Ministry of Cultural Heritage's 100 Italian films to be saved, a list of 100 films that "have changed the collective memory of the country between 1942 and 1978."

== Plot ==
During the Ferragosto national holiday, 36-year-old Bruno Cortona drives through the deserted streets of Rome in a flashy, expensive Lancia Aurelia. He spots Roberto Mariani, a timid and straight-laced law student studying for his upcoming exams, looking at him from his apartment window and asks to use his phone, as Bruno is late for a meeting with friends; however, they have already left without him. Complaining that he was "only" an hour late, he insists on buying Roberto an apéritif to thank him. Roberto hesitantly accepts, and they begin a spontaneous road trip through Lazio and Tuscany along the Via Aurelia on the Tyrrhenian coast.

As the two men become acquainted, Roberto learns the essentials of Bruno's personality: exuberant, coarse, charismatic, devil-may-care, impulsive, immature, and a womanizer. Bruno drives recklessly on the road, constantly attempting il sorpasso—i.e., aggressively honking, tailgating, speeding to pass cars in front of him, and jeering at slower drivers. Bruno encourages Roberto to smoke, party, and drink more. Throughout the journey, Roberto considers ditching Bruno at multiple stops, but cannot bring himself to tell Bruno the truth.

Stopping at a restaurant in Civitavecchia, Roberto confides in Bruno about his infatuation with his neighbor Valeria, who lives in the apartment building across the street from his, but he is too shy to speak to her. Later, the two stop to visit Roberto's relatives in his uncle and aunt's estate in rural Grosseto. Bruno quickly charms Roberto's relatives, while Roberto realizes the inaccuracy of his own childhood memories as he wanders the rooms of the house.

That evening, Bruno impulsively visits his estranged wife Gianna and 15-year-old daughter Lilli in Castiglioncello. Over the course of a tense evening, Roberto learns that Bruno and Gianna impulsively got married in their early 20s; that Bruno is not involved in his daughter's life; that Bruno is withholding an annulment from Gianna; and that Bruno stole 600,000 lire that Gianna had collected to bribe the monsignor to approve the annulment. Gianna bitterly tells Roberto that one day is enough to understand Bruno, as he has no hidden depths. Bruno is shocked to learn that Lilli is engaged to Bibi, a much older industrialist. When Gianna later rejects Bruno's sexual advances, he takes Roberto to sleep in deckchairs on the beach.

The next morning, Bruno and Roberto join Gianna, Lilli, Bibi, and a few friends on a yacht trip. Bibi explains to Bruno that he does not expect Lilli to love him, but will take good care of her anyway. In response, Bruno shocks Bibi by asking for a loan. Rebuffed, Bruno goads Bibi into betting 50,000 lire on a ping-pong match. Bruno wins, but learns shortly afterwards that Lilli has left on Bibi's yacht without saying goodbye. Meanwhile, Roberto works up the courage to call Valeria at her vacation spot in Viareggio, but is told that she is unavailable. Bruno offers to drive Roberto to see Valeria in Viareggio.

On the drive, Roberto tells Bruno that he has had the best two days of his life. As Roberto finally loosens up, he adopts Bruno's mannerisms, such as shouting at other drivers, and goads Bruno into passing another driver in front of them. When the driver refuses to yield, Bruno recklessly pursues the car through blind turns on the coastal road. To avoid an oncoming truck, he swerves violently and ends up hitting a traffic bollard. Bruno is thrown from the car, but Roberto is killed when the car falls down a cliff. While giving a statement to a passing police officer, a dazed Bruno realizes he has forgotten Roberto's last name.

== Cast ==
- Vittorio Gassman as Bruno Cortona
- Catherine Spaak as Lilli Cortona
- Jean-Louis Trintignant as Roberto Mariani
- Claudio Gora as Bibi
- Luciana Angiolillo (credited as Luciana Angelillo) as Gianna, Bruno's wife
- Linda Sini as Aunt Lidia
- Franca Polesello as commendatore's wife
- Nando Angelini as Amedeo
- Luigi Zerbinati as commendatore (uncredited)
- Annette Stroyberg as Trudy von Almen, one of the German tourists (uncredited)

== Soundtrack ==
The soundtrack includes original themes by Riz Ortolani, and Italian 1960s hits such as "Saint Tropez Twist" by Peppino di Capri, "Quando, quando, quando" performed by Emilio Pericoli, "Guarda come dondolo" and "Pinne fucile ed occhiali" by Edoardo Vianello and "Vecchio frac" by Domenico Modugno.

== Reception and legacy ==
According to Antonio Monda, the film was initially ignored by audiences and critics but became a word-of-mouth hit, as the film's road-trip structure appealed to "an emerging middle class craving travel ... in [a] period of economic boom". It was one of two highest-grossing Italian films in Italy for the year ended 30 June 1963 along with Sodom and Gomorrah. Critical appraisal took longer to improve, but Monda writes that today, the film is generally considered an "undisputed classic of Italian cinema; nobody would be ashamed to mention it in the same breath as an Antonioni or Visconti film, although at the time that would have been inconceivable."

Martin Scorsese cited the film as "the model" for his film The Color of Money (1986), highlighting its "relationship of the 'mentor' and the untutored youth, corrupted along the way". Alexander Payne added that he borrowed elements of the film for his Academy Award-winning film Sideways (2004).

On review aggregator website Rotten Tomatoes, the film holds an approval rating of 92% based on 12 reviews, with an average rating of 8.7/10.

=== Accolades ===
- Nastro d'Argento for Best Actor Vittorio Gassman
- Mar de Plata Film Festival Ástor Award for Best Director Dino Risi
