= Francesco Bertuccioli =

Italian film editor

Francesco Bertuccioli is an Italian editor. He has worked in Quello strano desiderio (1979), by Enzo Milioni; in gothic films such as L'amante del demonio, by Paolo Lombardo; and Un bianco vestito per Marialé (1972), by Romano Scavolini; and in crime films such as La belva col mitra (1977) along Adalberto Ceccarelli and Armando Bertuccioli.

== Filmography ==
- Trappola d'autore (2009)
- Killing of the Flesh (1983)
- Busco amante para un divorcio (1981)
- Il viziaccio (1980)
- Le mani di una donna sola (1979)
- Quello strano desiderio (1979)
- Supersexymarket (1979)
- The Sister of Ursula (1978)
- Beast with a Gun (1977)
- El ministro lo quiere todo (1977)
- La nipote del prete (1976)
- The Titbit (1976)
- La ingenua (1975)
- La polizia brancola nel buio (1975)
- Quella provincia maliziosa (1975)
- Strip Nude for Your Killer (1975)
- The Great Adventure (1975)
- La nipote (1974)
- I figli di nessuno (1975)
- Cuore (1973)
- Amor y Muerte en el Jardín (1972)
- La orgía de la sangre (1972)
- Scaramouche contra los enemigos de la corona (1972)
- Smile Before Death (1972)
- The Devil's Lover (1972)
- Twenty Paces to Death (1970)

== Bibliography ==
- Curti, Roberto (11 September 2017). Italian Gothic Horror Films, 1970-1979. McFarland Publishing. p. 256. ISBN 9781476629605.
