= Edward di Lorenzo =

- Occupation: Screenwriter

Edward di Lorenzo was an American screenwriter.

He also wrote for the series Miami Vice and The Wild Wild West. Writing for the big screen, The Idolmaker (1980) has been his greatest commercial success so far, although some consider Lady Frankenstein (1971) an artistically greater achievement.

Di Lorenzo contributed the scripts for "Ring Around the Moon", "Missing Link" and "Alpha Child" for Space: 1999 while also working as a script editor. His philosophical input for the series was also distilled into a novel White Light (1974), described by Johnny Byrne as a post-hippie version of Jonathan Livingston Seagull.

He taught screenwriting at the University of Southern California.

He died in 2023.
