= Mario Donatone =

Italian actor (1933–2020)

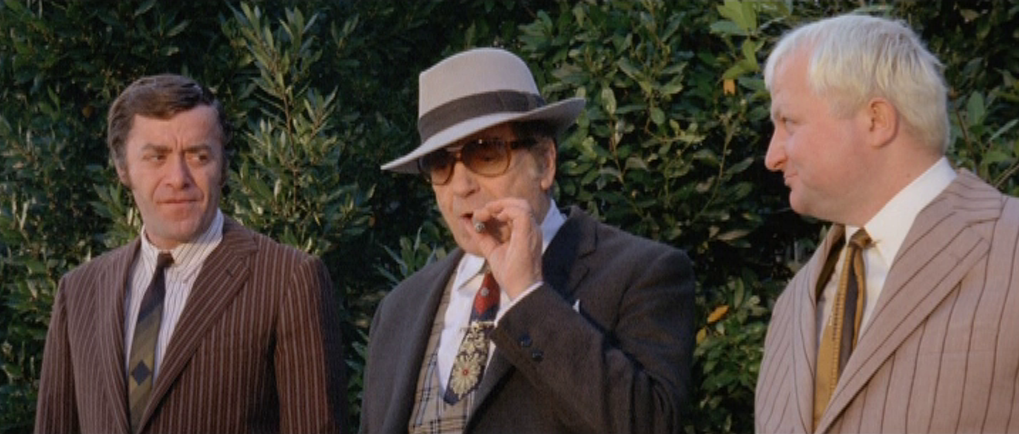
- Mario Donatone with Claudio Gora and Sandro Dori in Io non spezzo... rompo (1971)
- Born: 9 June 1933; Tripoli, Italian Libya
- Died: 14 April 2020 (aged 86); Rome, Italy
- Occupation: Actor

Mario Donatone (9 June 1933 – 14 April 2020) was an Italian actor.

== Filmography ==
=== Film ===
- Bellissima (1951) (uncredited)
- The Passionate Thief (1960)
- One Step to Hell (Caccia ai violenti) (1968)
- Kong Island (1968) as Forrester
- Io non spezzo... rompo (1971) as Tony Cupiello
- Boccaccio (1972)
- Storia di fifa e di coltello - Er seguito d'er più (1972)
- Storia de fratelli e de cortelli (1973)
- Kid il monello del west (1973)
- Madeleine, anatomia di un incubo (1974)
- Prete, fai un miracolo (1975)
- The Cop in Blue Jeans (1976) as Brigadiere all'ambasciata (uncredited)
- The Con Artists (1976) as Guard in 2nd Prison (uncredited)
- Crimebusters (1976) as Vieri Servant (uncredited)
- Due sul pianerottolo (1976)
- Hit Squad (1976) as Pasquale Icardi (uncredited)
- Swindle (1977) as Uomo truffato (uncredited)
- Il figlio dello sceicco (1978) as Uomo in ufficio a Roma (uncredited)
- The Gang That Sold America (1979) as Man at Gitto's Funeral
- Assassinio sul Tevere (1979) as Sabatucci
- I Don't Understand You Anymore (1980)
- Delitto a Porta Romana (1980) as Tassinelli
- I'm Getting a Yacht (1980)
- Uno contro l'altro, praticamente amici (1981) as Capo operaio (uncredited)
- La casa stregata (1982) as Portiere dell'albergo (uncredited)
- My Darling, My Dearest (1982)
- Delitto sull'autostrada (1982) as Sergio Taruscio (uncredited)
- Count Tacchia (1982) as Er Ciriola
- Hajji Washington (1983)
- Sing Sing (1983)
- Il diavolo e l'acquasanta (1983) as Commissario
- Crime in Formula One (1984) as Gaetano Maresca
- A tu per tu (1984)
- Phenomena (1985)
- I Am an ESP (1985)
- Lady of the Night (1986)
- The Professor (1986) as Il pretore del 1° processo
- La croce dalle 7 pietre (1987)
- Thrilling Love (1989) as Tony Boitan
- The Godfather Part III (1990) as Mosca
- Angel with a Gun (1991) as Velasco
- Copenhagen fox-trot (1993)
- S.P.Q.R.: 2,000 and a Half Years Ago (1994) as Princeps Senatus
- Oltre la quarta dimensione (1996)
- Roseanna's Grave (1997) as Old Guard
- The Scent of the Night (1998) as Cardinale
- La vita, per un'altra volta (1999) as Toccarello
- Picasso's Face (2000) as Sosia Picasso
- Si fa presto a dire amore (2000) as Gonzalo
- Chi nasce tondo... (2000)
- Agosto (2009) as Mario
- Annamaura (2012) as Co-protagonist (credit only)
- Il ragioniere della mafia (2013) as Cardinale Ascienza
- La terra e il vento (2013) as Nonno Mario
- Il ragazzo della Giudecca (2016) as Vecchietto
- John Wick: Chapter 2 (2017) as Cardinal
- Italian Business (2017) as Vittorio
- Incontriamoci (2017) as Don Massimo (final film role)

=== Television ===
- Parole e sangue (1982) as Bregni
- Piazza Navona (1988)
- Un uomo di rispetto (1993, TV Movie)
