= Johnny Yuma (film) =

1966 film

- Directed by: Romolo Girolami
- Screenplay by: Sauro Scavolini; Giovanni Simonelli; Romolo Girolami; Fernando Di Leo
- Produced by: Italo Zingarelli
- Starring: Mark Damon; Lawrence Dobkin; Rosalba Neri
- Cinematography: Mario Capriotti
- Edited by: Sergio Montanari
- Music by: Nora Orlandi
- Production companies: Tiger Film; West Film
- Distributed by: Delta
- Release date: 1966
- Running time: 100 minutes
- Country: Italy

Johnny Yuma is an Italian Spaghetti Western directed by Romolo Girolami and starring Mark Damon, Rosalba Neri, and Lawrence Dobkin.

== Plot ==
Conniving wife Samantha Felton has her husband murdered and finds herself butting heads with his heir and nephew Johnny Yuma. The woman then enlists the assistance of her ex-lover Linus Carradine, a professional gunslinger, to kill Johnny. When she tries to double-cross Carradine, he and the heir team up and kill her bodyguards. The lover is killed, but just before he dies, he sabotages her water supply. She flees across the desert, but is found the next day having died of thirst.

== Cast ==
- Mark Damon as Johnny Yuma
- Lawrence Dobkin as Linus Jerome Carradine
- Rosalba Neri as Samantha Felton
- Luigi Vannucchi (Louis Vanner) as Pedro
- Fidel Gonzáles as Fidel Alvarez Cortese Sanchez Garcia
- Gustavo D'Arpe (Gus Harper) as Pitt
- Dada Gallotti as Flaminia Jandolo

== Soundtrack ==
The film's score was composed by female Italian composer Nora Orlandi

== Release ==
Johnny Yuma was released in 1966.
