= Ottavio Alessi =

Italian screenwriter, producer and film director

- Born: 1 January 1919; Cammarata, Italy
- Died: 28 April 1978 (aged 59)
- Occupation(s): Screenwriter; Director

Ottavio Alessi (1 January 1919 - 28 April 1978) was an Italian screenwriter, producer and film director.

== Life and career ==
Born in Cammarata, Province of Agrigento, Alessi entered the film industry in 1940 as an assistant director. In 1945 he started an intense career as a screenwriter, alternating between genre films and art films and collaborating with Pietro Germi, Franco Rossi, Folco Quilici and Luciano Salce, among others. He also directed two films in the 1960s.

== Selected filmography ==
Director and screenwriter

- What Ever Happened to Baby Toto? (1964) (a parody of What Ever Happened to Baby Jane?).
- Top Sensation (1969)

Screenwriter

- The Testimony (1946)
- Friends for Life (1955)
- A Woman Alone (1956)
- Juke box urli d'amore (1959)
- Wild Cats on the Beach (1959)
- The Mongols (1961)
- Charge of the Black Lancers (1962)
- La ragazzola (1965)
- Bali (1970)
- Emanuelle in Bangkok (1976)
- La Bidonata (1977)
- Emanuelle in America (1977)
- The Precarious Bank Teller (1980)
