= The Mighty Anselmo and His Squire =

- Directed by: Bruno Corbucci
- Written by: Mario Amendola; Bruno Corbucci; Castellano & Pipolo
- Produced by: Dino De Laurentiis
- Starring: Alighiero Noschese; Enrico Montesano
- Cinematography: Aldo Tonti
- Music by: Guido & Maurizio De Angelis
- Release date: 1972
- Country: Italy
- Language: Italian

The Mighty Anselmo and His Squire (Italian: Il prode Anselmo e il suo scudiero) is a 1972 comedy film directed by Bruno Corbucci and starring Alighiero Noschese and Enrico Montesano.

== Cast ==
- Alighiero Noschese as Anselmo da Montebello
- Enrico Montesano as Gianpuccio Senzaterra
- Erminio Macario as Frà Prosdocimo Zatterin from San Donà di Piave
- Mario Carotenuto as Bishop of Montebello
- Lino Banfi as Fra Prosdocimo's Servant
- Renzo Montagnani as Ottone di Buldoffen
- Tamara Baroni as Gerbina
- Maria Baxa as Fiammetta
- Femi Benussi as Laura
- Sandro Dori as The Peasant
- Marie Sophie as Leonzia
- Ignazio Leone as Bishop at the Execution
- Mimmo Poli as The Innkeeper
- Marcello Martana as Marcozzo
