= Lady Frankenstein =

1971 film

- Theatrical release poster
- Directed by: Mel Welles
- Screenplay by: Edward di Lorenzo
- Story by: Dick Randall
- Produced by: Mel Welles
- Starring: Joseph Cotten; Rosalba Neri; Paul Muller; Herbert Fux; Riccardo Pizzuti; Mickey Hargitay
- Cinematography: Riccardo Pallottini
- Edited by: Cleofe Conversi
- Music by: Alessandro Alessandroni
- Production companies: Condor International Films; Alexia Films
- Distributed by: Alexia
- Release date: 22 October 1971 (Italy)
- Running time: 99 minutes
- Country: Italy
- Budget: under $200,000
- Box office: 139 million lire

Lady Frankenstein is a 1971 Italian horror film directed by Mel Welles and written by Edward di Lorenzo. It stars Rosalba Neri (under the pseudonym Sara Bey), Joseph Cotten, Mickey Hargitay and Paul Müller. The film is very loosely based on Frankenstein by Mary Shelley.

== Plot ==
Somewhere in Western-Central Europe in the 1860s, a trio of grave robbers, led by a man named Lynch, deliver a corpse to Baron Frankenstein and his assistant Dr. Marshall for obvious reanimation purposes.

Baron Frankenstein's daughter Tania arrives from school, having completed her studies in medicine, and is greeted by her father and his young servant, the handsome but mildly intellectually disabled Thomas. Tania reveals to her father that she has always understood his work with "animal transplants" to be a cover for his work reanimating corpses and that she intends to follow in his footsteps and help him in his work.

The next day, Frankenstein, Tania, and Marshall witness the execution of a criminal who is hanged down a well. Frankenstein and Marshall both have an eye toward harvesting the criminal's body for their experimentation. Law enforcement agent Captain Harris arrives to harass Lynch at the hanging. Harris claims to be on to Lynch's grave robbing.

That evening, having harvested salient body parts, Frankenstein and Marshall successfully reanimate a gruesome giant corpse with a scarred, misshapen head. When Marshall goes to tell Tania of her father's success, however, this monster bear-hugs Frankenstein to death - breaking his back - then walks out of the castle. Tania and Marshall report the murder to Harris but claim that it was a burglar. Harris points out that according to their description, the burglar would be over seven feet tall.

The monster, roaming the countryside, comes across a couple having sex out in the open, and after scaring away the man, picks up the woman, who screams and then faints. The monster then carries her to a river and tosses her in, and when two men later find the body, the monster kills one by breaking his neck. After Harris questions Lynch, and Lynch refuses Tania's offer for more grave-robbing work, the monster breaks into Lynch's home while he is having sex with a local prostitute and kills Lynch by beating him to death. The monster then kills a local farmer, his wife, and Lynch's two grave-robbing friends.

Tania then goads Marshall into admitting to harboring romantic feelings for her. She responds to his affections but says that while Marshall's body is old, she finds Thomas's body young and attractive. The "solution" to this situation will be to transplant Marshall's brilliant brain into the brain-damaged Thomas's young, healthy body. To accomplish this, Tania seduces Thomas into having sex while Marshall secretly watches, and Marshall kills him with a pillow during their lovemaking.

Tania then successfully transplants Marshall's brain into Thomas's body. Thomas now speaks with Marshall's voice, and his body has become inhumanly strong as well. Meanwhile, Frankenstein's monster has continued to terrorize the town, and the local villagers, having had enough, arrive with torches and pitchforks before following the monster to the castle. In the chaos, the monster returns, knocks down Harris, and has a fight with Marshall/Thomas, who cuts off his arm. When the monster bear-hugs Marshall/Thomas, Tania stabs him in the back with a sword, and Marshall/Thomas kills him by puncturing his head open with a metal hand tool. The monster is defeated, but Tania has made it clear that she has no allegiance to Marshall.

The villagers storm into the castle and set it aflame in the hopes of killing the monster. Harris arrives with Thomas's sister Julia to see Tania and Marshall/Thomas naked and enjoying post-fight sexual intercourse as the castle burns beside them. However, during their lovemaking, Marshall/Thomas begins to choke Tania as the flames consume them.

== Cast ==
- Rosalba Neri (as Sara Bay) as Dr. Tania Frankenstein
- Joseph Cotten as Baron Frankenstein
- Paul Muller as Dr. Charles Marshall
- Herbert Fux as Tom Lynch, the graverobber
- Marino Masé (as Peter Whiteman) as Thomas Stack
- Mickey Hargitay as Captain Harris
- Lorenzo Terzon (as Lawrence Tilden) as Harris' assistant
- Renate Kasché (as Renata Cash) as Julia Stack, Thomas' Sister
- Riccardo Pizzuti as The Creature

== Production ==
Mel Welles was originally approached by Vanderbilt family member Henry Cooke Cushing IV with a screenplay titled Lady Dracula. Cushing was determined to produce a film starring actress Rosalba Neri, whom he was romantically pursuing. Recalling the film's development and their relationship, Welles explained that Neri "was turning him down, everywhere. She couldn't actually stand him; Harry was actually quite good-looking, but he was a pain in the neck because he had never lived in the real world ― and that's what she resented about him. He never worked a day in his life. So here, in my lap, he dropped the script and the money to do it. What a windfall!". Upon discovering that the rights to the Lady Dracula script were actually held by actor Brad Harris, Welles wrote a new screenplay with his friend, television writer Edward di Lorenzo, which was completed in three weeks; Welles also desired to incorporate feminist themes into the narrative. Film historian Roberto Curti has suggested that their script may have been inspired by "For the Love of Frankenstein", a story by Bill Warren and Jack Sparling that had appeared in the fourth issue of the comic book Vampirella.

Welles was assisted by fellow expatriate producer Dick Randall in assembling the remainder of the cast, which included Joseph Cotten and Mickey Hargitay. $90,000 of Lady Frankenstein's budget was originally intended to be provided through a letter of credit given to Welles by producer Skip Steloff, which was denied by the Italian banks shortly prior to the start of production. The money needed to make the film was eventually secured by Welles' old colleague Roger Corman; as part of this arrangement, Corman's studio New World Pictures gained the film's American distribution rights. According to Randall, the film's low budget, estimated to be less than $200,000, resulted in Cotten's schedule being shortened to two weeks and his part being rewritten so that his character's death would take place earlier in the film.

Principal photography began on March 1, 1971, with most interiors being shot at De Paolis Studios in Rome, while several castle scenes were filmed at Castello Piccolomini. Aureliano Luppi was credited as the film's director on the Italian Public Cinematographic Register. Reflecting on the shoot, Neri stated that "For a number of reasons — not sentimental ones, anyway — I used to go around with [Welles], his wife and children. Frankly, I don't think of him as a great director; on that film was a talented cameraman, Riccardo Pallottini, who did everything by himself — those nice lightings, for instance... he used to place the camera, then he waited for the director; he also solved technical problems and so forth".

== Release ==
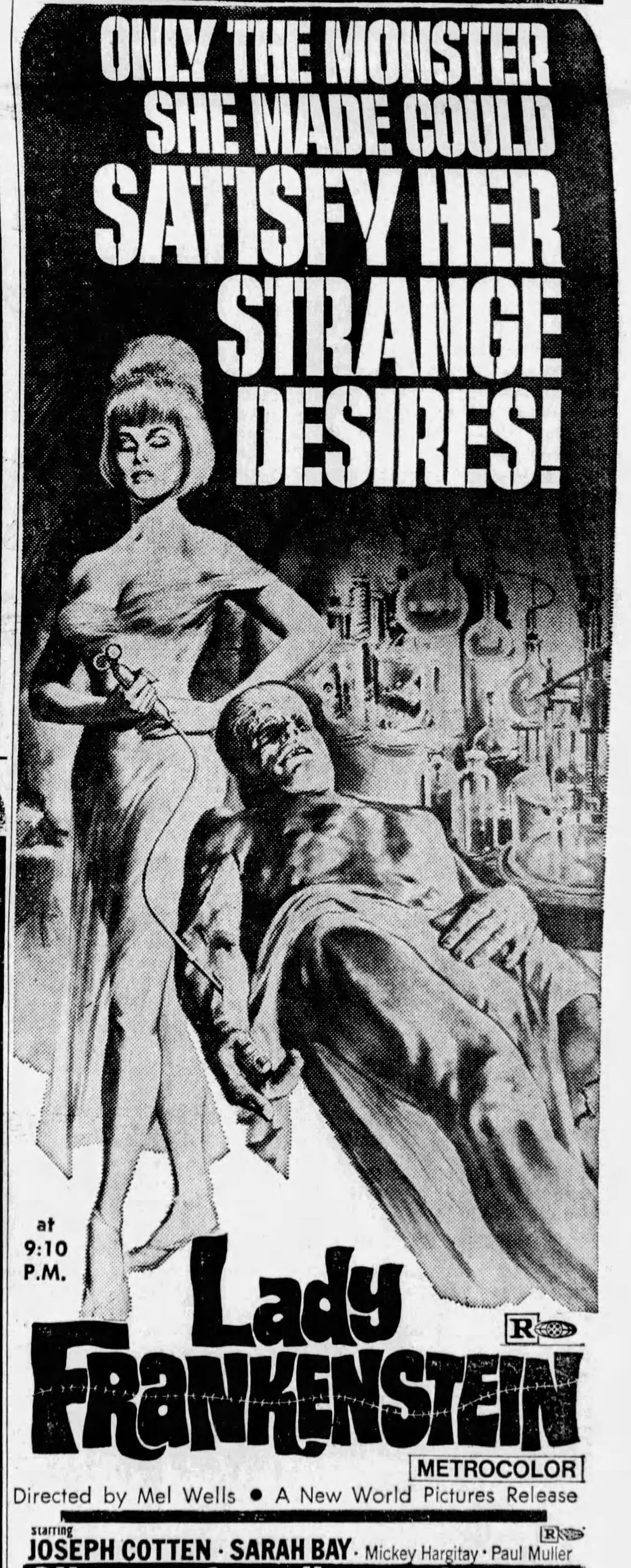
U.S. theatrical advertisement from 1972

Lady Frankenstein was distributed theatrically in Italy by Alexia on 22 October 1971. It grossed a total of 139,683,000 Italian lire domestically, a performance Curti declared "mediocre". It was released in the United States in March 1972 by New World Pictures in a version that was ten minutes shorter than the Italian prints, with cuts that removed expository scenes but left its violence and nudity intact.

In Australia, Lady Frankenstein was released by Welles and his then-business partner Richard Lewellen, a former colleague of exploitation film producer Kroger Babb, as a segment of their theatrical production Orgy of Evil. The performance section of the program, which combined spook show conventions with Grand Guignol elements, starred Welles as Satan's Prime Minister, and featured a series of illusions created with props purchased from Abbott's Magic Novelty Company that culminated in a statue of Satan coming to life to terrorize the audience; after an intermission, the film would be screened. The show featured choreography by Anita Ardell, production design by William Hutchinson, and an original score by Tommy Tycho. The world premiere for Orgy of Evil was set to take place at the Metro Theatre in Sydney on July 6, 1973, but rolling blackouts forced it to be pushed back by a week to July 13. Due to financing difficulties and protests from religious groups, Orgy of Evil lasted for only a handful of performances, ending Welles' partnership with Lewellen.

== Reception ==
In his analysis of the film, Louis Paul described Lady Frankenstein as "a hybrid of the '70s Hammer horror films' infatuation with nudity and sadism and the golden age of Italian horror's gothic period."

== See also ==
- List of films featuring Frankenstein's monster
- List of films in the public domain in the United States
- Women in science fiction
