= Beast with a Gun =

1977 film

- DVD cover
- Italian: La belva col mitra
- Directed by: Sergio Grieco
- Screenplay by: Sergio Grieco
- Story by: Sergio Grieco
- Produced by: Armando Bertuccioli; Francesco Bertuccioli
- Starring: Helmut Berger; Marisa Mell; Richard Harrison
- Cinematography: Vittorio Bernini
- Edited by: Francesco Bertuccioli; Adalberto Ceccarelli
- Music by: Umberto Smaila
- Production company: Supercine
- Distributed by: C.I.A.
- Release date: 29 October 1977 (Italy)
- Running time: 94 minutes
- Country: Italy
- Box office: ₤813,891 million

Beast with a Gun (Italian: La belva col mitra), also known as Mad Dog Killer, is a 1977 Italian noir poliziottesco film written and directed by Sergio Grieco. The film would be Grieco's final film, as he died in 1982.

The main character of the film, Nanni Vitali, was loosely inspired by Renato Vallanzasca.

== Plot ==
Dangerous criminal Nanni Vitali escapes from prison with four accomplices. The four steal a car, rob a petrol station and beat the owners to death. They then they kidnap Barbareschi, the person who had originally given the tip off to the authorities that led to Vitali's arrest. At the time of Barbareschi's kidnapping, there is also his woman, Giuliana, who is raped by Vitali himself while his accomplices beat up and kill Barbareschi. Commissioner Santini, son of the prosecutor who had sentenced Vitali, tries to stop him.

Battles continue between the two: the criminals blackmail Giuliana, trying to organize a robbery with her which is unsuccessful thanks to the confession of Giuliana, who goes to the police station to reveal the intentions of the criminals. Commissioner Santini then organizes a trap in which Vitali's accomplices are captured. They manage to escape, making his way by shooting his machine gun from a speeding car. Vitali visits his sister to ask her for money and tells her that he will leave the country only after settling accounts with Commissioner Santini and with Giuliana who has betrayed him.

Back in the city, he lurks in the building opposite the one where Giuliana is staying managing to wound her with a rifle. Later, having secured the collaboration of a young delinquent of his admirer, Aldo Pacesi known as Bimbo, kidnaps Carla and Judge Santini, respectively sister and father of the Commissioner. Receiving phone calls asking for ransom, Inspector Santini locates the kidnappers in an abandoned shed in a small village. They shoot and kill Pacesi as Santini also manages to get the better of Vitali with a fight that ends in a hand-to-hand combat. The police intervene to arrest Vitali, and at the same time Santini's father, who had been wounded by Pacesi in a clumsy escape attempt, is taken away in an ambulance, remaining alive.

== Cast ==
- Helmut Berger as Nanni Vitali
- Richard Harrison as Commissioner Giulio Santini
- Marisa Mell as Giuliana Caroli
- Marina Giordana as Carla Santini
- Luigi Bonos as Pappalardo
- Ezio Marano as Ezio Barbareschi
- Vittorio Duse as Caroli
- Alberto Squillante as Aldo "Bimbo" Pacesi
- Nello Pazzafini as Pietro Caporali

== Production ==
The film was shot I.C.E.T. De Paolis Studios in Milan and on location in and around Ancona.

== Release ==
La belva col mitra was distributed theatrically by C.I.A. in Italy on October 29, 1977. It grossed a total of 813,891,000 Italian lira domestically. It was released in the United States variously as Beast with a Gun, The Human Beast, and Mad Dog Killer.

The American VIDCREST VHS release was titled "Mad Dog".

The film is featured in Quentin Tarantino's Jackie Brown where the characters Louis Gara (Robert De Niro) and Melanie (Bridget Fonda) are watching it.

== Cancelled sequel ==
A sequel to the film was discussed but never materialised which would have had Vitalli escape prison again this time to seek revenge against a gangster that killed his sister. Richard Harrison would have also returned this time reluctantly joining forces with Vitalli to take out the gangster. The film would have ended with Vitalli faking his death escaping to the USA.
