= Bruno Corbucci =

Italian screenwriter and film director

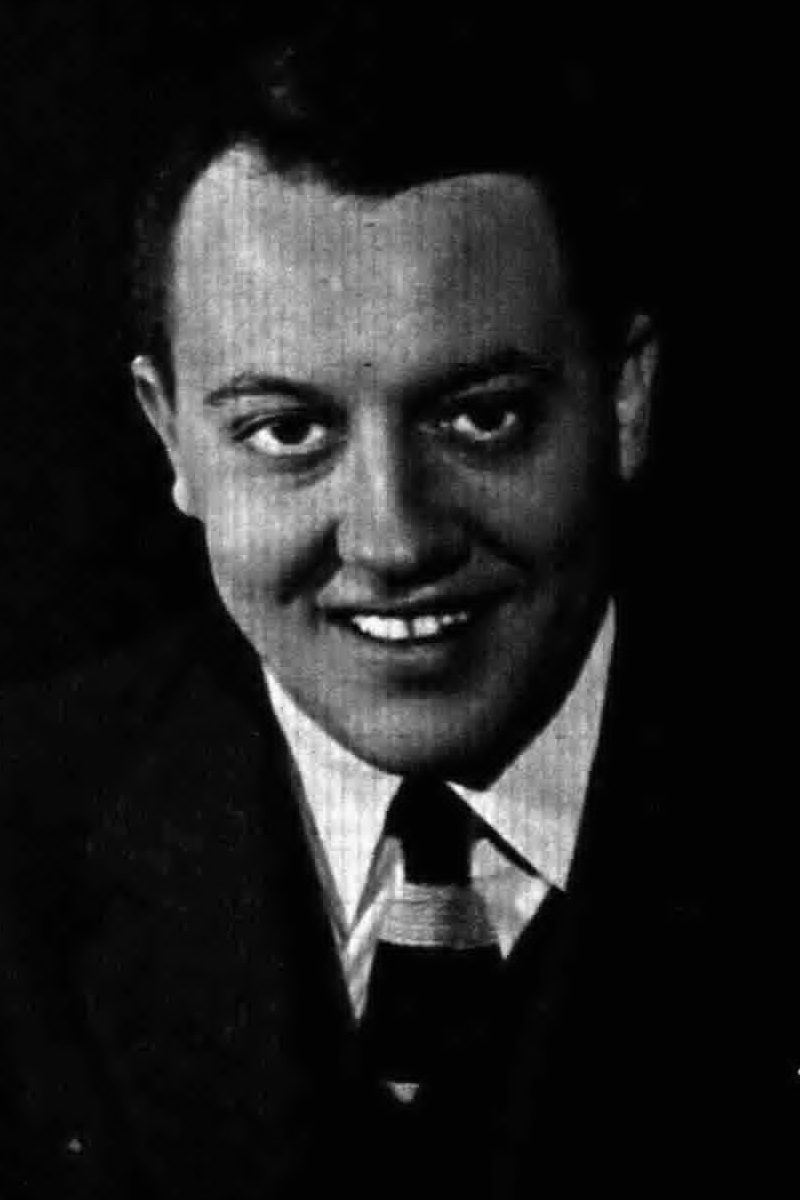
- Corbucci in 1960
- Born: 23 October 1931; Rome, Kingdom of Italy
- Died: 7 September 1996 (aged 64); Rome, Italy
- Occupations: Screenwriter, film director

Bruno Corbucci (23 October 1931 – 7 September 1996) was an Italian screenwriter and film director. He was the younger brother of Sergio Corbucci and wrote many of his films. He was born in Rome, where he also died.

The vast majority of his directorial efforts are lowbrow comedies. He also directed I figli del leopardo, a parody of Il gattopardo. His biggest success came with the long-running "Nico Giraldi" series, which starred Tomas Milian as a foul-mouthed Roman policeman.

His 1971 film Io non spezzo... rompo was shown as part of a retrospective on Italian comedy at the 67th Venice International Film Festival.

== Selected filmography ==
=== As screenwriter ===
- Who Hesitates Is Lost (1960)
- Toto's First Night (1962)
- Colpo gobbo all'italiana (1962)
- Sexy Toto (1963)
- Tears on Your Face (1964)
- Rita the American Girl (1965)
- James Tont operazione U.N.O. (1965)
- James Tont operazione D.U.E. (1966)
- Il vostro super agente Flit (1966)
- 4 Dollars of Revenge (1966)
- Ms. Stiletto (1969)
- Io non spezzo... rompo (1971)
- Pasqualino Cammarata, Frigate Captain (1974)
- La casa stregata (1982)

=== As director ===
- James Tont operazione U.N.O. (1965)
- Questo pazzo, pazzo mondo della canzone (1965)
- James Tont operazione D.U.E. (1965)
- Ringo e Gringo contro tutti (1966)
- Spia spione (1966)
- Marinai in coperta (1967)
- Peggio per me... meglio per te (1967)
- Riderà (Cuore matto) (1967)
- I 2 pompieri (1968)
- The Longest Hunt (1968)
- Zum zum zum - La canzone che mi passa per la testa (1969)
- Ms. Stiletto (1969)
- Lisa dagli occhi blu (1969)
- Zum zum zum n° 2 (1969)
- Bolidi sull'asfalto - A tutta birra! (1970)
- Due bianchi nell'Africa nera (1970)
- Nel giorno del Signore (1970)
- Il furto è l'anima del commercio!?... (1971)
- Io non spezzo... rompo (1971)
- When Men Carried Clubs and Women Played Ding-Dong (1971)
- Boccaccio (1972)
- The Mighty Anselmo and His Squire (1972)
- The Three Musketeers of the West (1973)
- A forza di sberle (1974)
- Il trafficone (1974)
- The Cop in Blue Jeans (1976)
- Hit Squad (1976)
- Messalina, Messalina! (1977)
- Swindle (1977)
- Little Italy (1978)
- The Gang That Sold America (1979)
- Assassinio sul Tevere (1979)
- The Finzi Detective Agency (1979)
- Delitto a Porta Romana (1980)
- Crime at the Chinese Restaurant (1981)
- Il ficcanaso (1981)
- Uno contro l'altro, praticamente amici (1981)
- Delitto sull'autostrada (1982)
- La casa stregata (1982)
- Cat and Dog (1983)
- Il diavolo e l'acquasanta (1983)
- Crime in Formula One (1984)
- Cop in Drag (1984)
- Miami Supercops (1985)
- Aladdin (1986)
- Le volpi della notte (1986)
- Rimini Rimini - Un anno dopo (1988)
- Classe di ferro (1989)
- Classe di ferro 2 (1991)
- Quelli della speciale (1993)
