= Norberto Soliño =

- Born: 1902; Murguía, La Coruña
- Father: Ramón Soliño

Norberto Soliño (born 1902) was a cinematographer businessman.

He was born in Murguía, La Coruña. He moved to La Habana with his family and he studied in a school in Pokespaie, New Jersey. Then he worked with his parents and he played in the Cuba national football team, but he got an injury and left it.

In 1936 he worked with his father Ramón on CIFESA in La Habana, and they distributed films on Hispanoamerica. At the end of 1937 he led the direction of Hispano-Film-Produktion along Johann W. Ther, and CINA. This project was received by the Germans through the figure of Wilhelm Ther and became part of a powerful cinematographic industry which was expanded since Hitler's rise to power. He began offering contracts to many Spanish stars, so he hired Florián Rey, Benito Perojo, Imperio Argentina, Estrellita Castro, Miguel Ligero, Roberto Rey and Ricardo Merino, between others. He produced El barbero de Sevilla (1938) with Estrellita Castro and Roberto Rey, and La gitanilla (1940).

After the Spanish Civil War he came back to Spain.

== Filmography ==
- Shoot First... Ask Questions Later (1975)
- Fuzzy the Hero (1973)
- Don't Turn the Other Cheek (1971)
- Companeros (1970)
- Un par de asesinos (1970)
- Dead Are Countless (1969)
- The Mercenary (1968)
- Cara a cara (1967)
- Pero... ¿en qué país vivimos? (1967)
- El padre Manolo (1967)
- For a Few Dollars More (1965)
- Texas Ranger (1964)
- Black Angel of the Mississippi (1964)
- Cristo negro (1963)
- Implacable Three (1963)
- The Sign of the Coyote (1963)
- Terrible Sheriff (1962)
- Shades of Zorro
- Fray Escoba (1961)
- Ella y los veteranos (1961)

== Bibliography ==
- Nicolás Meseguer, Manuel (2004). La intervención velada: el apoyo cinematográfico alemán al bando franquista, 1936-1939. EDITUM. p. 318. ISBN 9788483714638.
