= José Jaspe =

Spanish actor (1906–1974)

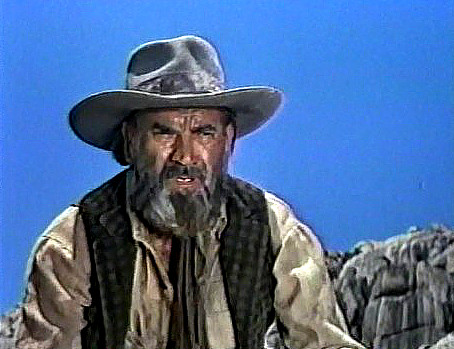
- Jose Jaspe in The Relentless Four (1965)
- Born: José Jaspe Rivas; 10 August 1906; Corunna, Galicia, Spain
- Died: 5 June 1974 (aged 67); Becerril de la Sierra, Spain
- Occupation: Actor
- Years active: 1941-1974

José Jaspe (Galician: Xosé Jaspe Rivas) (10 August 1906 – 5 June 1974) was a Spanish film actor.

He played Konev the conductor in Horror Express (1972), Ahmed in House of 1,000 Dolls (1967), Henneker in The Man Called Noon (1973), the traitor in The Centurion (1961), Sabrath in The Golden Arrow (1962), Spanish POW in Submarine Attack (1954), José in Black Jack (1950), and Enrique in El pobre rico (1942), by Ignacio F. Iquino. He appeared in the Spaghetti Western film Jesse James' Kid (1965), starring Mercedes Alonso, Roberto Camardiel and Luis Induni.

He died in Becerril de la Sierra in 1974.

== Selected filmography ==
- El sobre lacrado (1941)
- We Thieves Are Honourable (1942) - Pelirrojo
- El pobre rico (1942)
- La culpa del otro (1942) - Patrón
- Boda accidentada (1943) - Mario
- Un enredo de familia (1943) - Niceto
- El abanderado (1943) - Malasaña
- Mi fantástica esposa (1944)
- Paraíso sin Eva (1944)
- El sobrino de don Buffalo Bill (1944)
- El rey de las finanzas (1944) - Canadiense
- The Phantom and Dona Juanita (1945) - Amaru
- Thirsty Land (1945)
- Su última noche (1945) - Jerry
- Gentleman Thief (1946) - Star
- The Prodigal Woman (1946) - Conde de Zuera
- El pirata Bocanegra (1946) - Capitán Sosa
- El otro Fu-Man-Chú (1946)
- María Fernanda, la Jerezana (1947) - Ricardo Prado Rey
- Las inquietudes de Shanti Andía (1947) - Chim
- Héroes del 95 (1947)
- Reina santa (1947) - Estevao (uncredited)
- Dulcinea (1947) - Chiquirnaque
- The Captain's Ship (1947)
- Lady in Ermine (1947) - Andrés
- The Princess of the Ursines (1947) - Truhán
- Four Women (1947) - Dueño del café
- Luis Candelas, el ladrón de Madrid (1947) - Mariano Balseiro
- La próxima vez que vivamos (1948)
- Las aguas bajan negras (1948) - Plutón, mining foreman
- Póker de ases (1948) - Pardo Leiva
- A Toast for Manolete (1948) - Bronquista en bar
- Pototo, Boliche y Compañía (1948)
- La manigua sin dios (1949)
- ¡Fuego! (1949)
- The Duchess of Benameji (1949) - Bandolero #3
- Peace (1949) - Oficial de las fuerzas del este
- El sótano (1949) - Borracho
- Ninety Minutes (1950) - Sr. Dupont
- Agustina of Aragon (1950)
- Black Jack (1950) - José
- The Lioness of Castille (1951) - Juan Bravo
- Dawn of America (1951) - Marinero
- The Call of Africa (1952) - Majayu
- Frine, Courtesan of Orient (1953) - Crosio, mercante di schiave
- Mamma perdonami! (1953) - Enrico
- Musoduro (1953) - Carabinieri
- Carmen (1953) - Tuerto
- Condannatelo! (1953) - Ferdinando
- Ultima illusione (1954) - Produttore cinema
- Submarine Attack (1955) - Spanish POW
- Folgore Division (1955) - Mario Salvi
- I quattro del getto tonante (1955) - Maresciallo Alberti
- Operazione notte (1957)
- Saranno uomini (1957)
- El Alamein (1957) - (uncredited)
- Classe di ferro (1957) - Filadelfio
- The Italians They Are Crazy (1958)
- Legs of Gold (1958) - assistente di Renzoli
- La sfida (1958) - Ferdinando Ajello
- Conspiracy of the Borgias (1959) - Falconetto
- Knight Without a Country (1959)
- Poor Millionaires (1959) - Store Manager
- Devil's Cavaliers (1959) - Jermaine, Stiller Henchman
- Noi siamo due evasi (1959) - Jacinto
- The Night of the Great Attack (1959) - Il Tacca
- Nel blu dipinto di blu (1959) - Maresciallo dei Carabinieri
- The Dam on the Yellow River (1960) - Slansky
- Queen of the Pirates (1960) - Captain Mirko, Duke's Ally
- Le bal des espions (1960)
- Mobby Jackson (1960)
- Spade senza bandiera (1961) - Priest
- Capitani di ventura (1961)
- The Centurion (1961) - Traitor
- Rage of the Buccaneers (1961) - Captain Tortuga
- Scano Boa (1961)
- The Golden Arrow (1962) - Sabrath
- The Sign of the Coyote (1963) - Lugones Brother
- Slave Girls of Sheba (1963) - Pirate
- The Black Tulip (1964) - Brignon
- Devil of the Desert Against the Son of Hercules (1964) - Akrim, the Slave Merchant
- Backfire (1964) - Libanos (uncredited)
- Cyrano and d'Artagnan (1964) - (uncredited)
- Texas Ranger (1964) - Mortimer
- Saul and David (1964) - (uncredited)
- Jesse James' Kid (1965)
- The Dictator's Guns (1965)
- The Great Leaders (1965) - Zebah
- The Relentless Four (1965) - Implacable
- Doctor Zhivago (1965) - Man who fires the shot that starts the revolution (uncredited)
- El Rojo (1966) - José Garibaldi
- Four Queens for an Ace (1966) - Enrique Manega
- Savage Pampas (1966) - Pvt. Luis
- Cervantes (1967) - Turkish Official
- The House of 1,000 Dolls (1967) - Ahmed
- Killer Adios (1968) - Bob Elliott
- Dos hombres van a morir (1968) - Zachary Hutchinson
- A Stranger in Paso Bravo (1968) - Paquito
- Un colpo da mille miliardi (1968)
- Day After Tomorrow (1968) - Pablo
- Pistol for a Hundred Coffins (1968) - David, Madman (uncredited)
- White Comanche (1968) - (uncredited)
- Krakatoa: East of Java (1968)
- Taste of Vengeance (1968) - Mother Douglas - Phil, 'Filthy Bottom'
- Tiempos de Chicago (1969) - Truck Driver
- Playgirl 70 (1969)
- La última aventura del Zorro (1969) - El Gobernador
- More Dollars for the MacGregors (1970) - Sheriff of Jonesville
- Light the Fuse... Sartana Is Coming (1970) - Gen. Monk
- Growing Leg, Diminishing Skirt (1970)
- Red Sun (1971) - Locomotive Driver (uncredited)
- Boulevard do Rum (1971)
- Long Live Your Death (1971) - The old man
- I senza Dio (1972) - Curpancho
- Horror Express (1972) - Konev - Conductor
- Treasure Island (1972) - Tommy
- Marianela (1972) - Sr. Centeno
- La isla misteriosa y el capitán Nemo (1973)
- The Man Called Noon (1973) - Henneker
- The Three Musketeers of the West (1973) - Whistling Man (uncredited)
- Pasqualino Cammarata, Frigate Captain (1974)
- La loba y la Paloma (1974) - Acebo
- La noche de la furia (1974) - Sheriff

== Bibliography ==
- Aros, Andrew A. (1977). An actor guide to the talkies, 1965 through 1974. Scarecrow Press, Incorporated. p. 771. ISBN 9780810810525.
- Peter Cowie & Derek Elley. World Filmography: 1967. Fairleigh Dickinson University Press, 1977.
- Dimmitt, Richard Bertrand (1967). An Actor Guide to the Talkies: A Comprehensive Listing of 8,000 Feature-length Films from January, 1949, Until December, 1964. Vol. 1. Scarecrow Press. p. 1555.
