= Lucio De Santis =

Italian actor (1922–2006)

- Born: 16 November 1922; Bologna, Italy
- Died: 23 August 2006 (aged 83); Caracas, Venezuela
- Occupation: Actor
- Years active: 1953-1970

Lucio De Santis (16 November 1922 – 23 August 2006) was an Italian actor. He appeared in more than twenty films from 1953 to 1970. De Santis was married to fellow actress Dina De Santis.

== Filmography ==
Year	Title	Role	Notes
1953	Frine, Courtesan of Orient	profugo di Tebe	
1956	War and Peace	Young Officer at Orgy	Uncredited
1962	2 samurai per 100 geishe	Samurai	
1963	I Am Semiramis	Marduk	
1963	Brennus, Enemy of Rome		
1964	The Masked Man Against the Pirates		
1965	Erik, the Viking	Erloff	
1965	Jesse James' Kid		
1965	La colt è la mia legge	Pedro in 2nd Stagecoach	
1965	Gideon and Samson: Great Leaders of the Bible	Nabur	
1965	A Coffin for the Sheriff	Mulligan	
1966	Django	Whipping Bandit	Uncredited
1966	Kill Johnny Ringo	Saloon Drunk	
1966	Ringo and His Golden Pistol	Carlos Perez	
1966	Texas, Adios	McLeod Henchman	Uncredited
1966	The Hills Run Red	Juan, Mendez Henchman	
1966	For a Few Extra Dollars	Union Sergeant	Uncredited
1966	Trap for Seven Spies	Bob Johnson	
1967	LSD Flesh of Devil	Jimmy Gioglu	
1967	Wanted	Henchman	Uncredited
1967	Son of Django	Hurricane, Henchman	
1967	The Rover	Fisherman	
1967	Un hombre vino a matar	Jeff	
1968	Django, Prepare a Coffin	Another one of the Hanged	
1968	Gunman Sent by God	Coleman henchman	
1968	Vengeance	Laredo	
1968	Execution	Sergeant	
1968	One by One	Big Boss Blackie	
1970	And God Said to Cain	Jim	(final film role)
