= Oreste Lionello =

Italian actor (1927–2009)

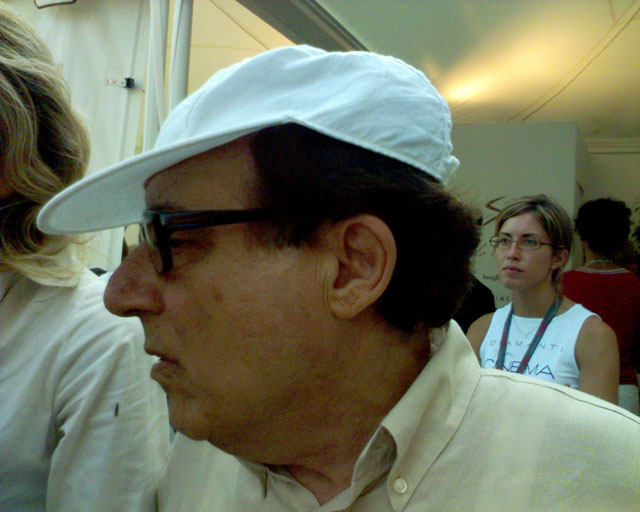
- Lionello in 2007
- Born: 18 April 1927; Rhodes, Kingdom of Italy
- Died: 19 February 2009 (aged 81); Rome, Italy
- Occupations: Actor; voice actor; cabaret performer; comedian; adapter; dubbing director
- Years active: 1953–2009
- Height: 1.63 m (5 ft 4 in)
- Spouse: Eliana Cefaro (divorced)
- Children: Luca; Cristiana; Davide; Alessia; Fabio Luigi; Vivianna

Oreste Lionello (18 April 1927 – 19 February 2009) was an Italian actor and voice actor.

== Biography ==
Lionello was born in Rhodes (which was then a possession of Italy), to Calabrian parents, and grew up in Reggio Calabria. He began his career as a theatre actor, and was considered amongst the founders of Italian cabaret. In 1953 he entered the Musical Theatrical Company of RAI (Italian state TV) and the following year he debuted in television with Marziano Filippo, a boys' show. In the 1960s, he was one of the founders of the Bagaglino comic theatre and TV company and he had found success as an entertainer on Italian TV in the 1970s and 1980s. As an actor, Lionello acted in over 56 feature films and several television shows. He appeared in five episodes of Le avventure di Laura Storm and he made his debut film appearance in The Cheerful Squadron.

As a voice actor, Lionello was the official Italian voice of Woody Allen. Other actors he dubbed included Charlie Chaplin, Groucho Marx, Dick Van Dyke, Peter Sellers, Gene Wilder, Michel Serrault, Donald Pleasence, Clive Revill, Gérard Depardieu, Rick Moranis and Roman Polanski. He also dubbed Robin Williams as Mork in the first two seasons of Mork & Mindy. In his animated roles, Lionello dubbed popular animated characters for Disney and Warner Bros. between the 1950s and 1970s. He was considered a pioneer of Italian voice dubbing and founded the C.V.D. along with Renato Turi, Giancarlo Giannini, Valeria Valeri, Corrado Gaipa and other dubbers.

=== Personal life ===
Lionello was married with six children, most of which followed in his footsteps. This includes Luca, Cristiana, Alessia and Davide, who are all actors and dubbers. His oldest son Fabio Luigi is a television director. He also had another daughter, Vivianna.

== Death ==
Lionello died on 19 February 2009 in Rome at the age of 81 after a long illness and was buried at the Campo Verano. Allen later paid tribute to him in an interview.

After his death, the voice of Woody Allen was passed on to Leo Gullotta.

== Filmography ==
=== Cinema ===
- The Cheerful Squadron (1954) - The Quartermaster's Assistant (uncredited)
- È arrivata la parigina (1958) - Basilio
- Devil's Cavaliers (1959) - Rollò, Stiller Henchman
- La cento chilometri (1959) - The Tram Passenger with Glasses (uncredited)
- Il Mattatore (1960) - Il Ragioniere (voice, uncredited)
- Toto, Fabrizi and the Young People Today (1960) - Student (uncredited)
- Le pillole di Ercole (1960) - Gino
- The Two Rivals (1960)
- Totòtruffa 62 (1961) - Pippo
- La voglia matta (1962) - Biondo (voice, uncredited)
- Nerone '71 (1962) - Aiutante della regista
- The Beast of Babylon Against the Son of Hercules (1963)
- The Swindlers (1963) - Ciocchi (segment "Medico e fidanzata")
- L'ultima carica (1964)
- Queste pazze pazze donne (1964) - Nannarella's Brother ('Il gentil sesso')
- Le sette vipere (Il marito latino) (1964) - Barbikian (voice, uncredited)
- The Magnificent Gladiator (1964) - Drusius
- Top Crack (1967) - Peter
- I due sanculotti (1966) - Napoleone
- Riderà! (Cuore matto) (1967) - Franco
- Mr. Kinky (1968) - Puccio
- VIP my Brother Superman (1968) - Mini VIP (voice)
- I quattro del pater noster (1969) - Mambo
- Four Flies on Grey Velvet (1971) - The Professor
- The Case of the Bloody Iris (1972) - Arthur - Photographer
- Mamma... li turchi! (1973) - Mamma li Turchi
- The Sensual Man (1973) - Painter
- Provaci anche tu Lionel (1973) - Lionel Lionelli
- Le avventure di Barbapapà (1973) - Narrator (voice, uncredited)
- Antoine and Sebastian (1974) - Ledieu
- Sesso in testa (1974) - Epifanio
- Poker in Bed (1974) - Alberto
- I sette magnifici cornuti (1974) - Antonio
- The Sensual Man (1974)
- The Sex Machine (1975) - Driver
- Un sorriso, uno schiaffo, un bacio in bocca (1975) - (voice)
- Sexycop (1976) - Commissario Solmi
- Remo e Romolo (Storia di due figli di una lupa) (1976) - Etrusco
- Soldier of Fortune (1976) - Giovenale da Vetralla
- The Best (1976) - Amilcare Chiocchietti
- La prima notte di nozze (1976)
- My Sister in Law (1976) - Francesco Lo Presti
- Cassiodoro il più duro del pretorio (1976)
- Nerone (1977) - Seneca
- Per amore di Poppea (1977) - Nero
- Kakkientruppen (1977) - Ispettore generale
- Scherzi da prete (1978) - Spartaco De Simone
- Tutti a squola (1979) - Professore di scienze
- L'imbranato (1979)
- Ciao marziano (1980) - Il mafioso
- Quella peste di Pierina (1982) - Il Tigre
- Attenti a quei P2 (1982) - Licio Belli
- Biancaneve & Co... (1982) - Mago Magone
- Ti spacco il muso, bimba! (1982)
- Petomaniac (1983) - Narratore (uncredited)
- Sfrattato cerca casa equo canone (1983) - Il nonno
- Massimamente folle (1985)
- Dov'era Lei a quell'Ora? (1992) - Procuratore Capo
- Storie di Seduzione (1995) - Policeman
- I Fetentoni (1999)
- Opopomoz (2003) - Scarapino (voice)
- No Problem (2008) - Signor Pairo
- Postcards from Rome (2008) - The dog (voice) (final film role)

== Dubbing roles ==
=== Animation ===
- Z in Antz
- Tibbs in One Hundred and One Dalmatians
- Roquefort / Georges Hautecourt in The Aristocats
- Boo-Boo Bear in Hey There, It's Yogi Bear!
- Grand Duke in Cinderella (1967 redub)
- Ziggy in The Jungle Book
- Jeremy Hillary Boob in Yellow Submarine
- Reverend Timms in Postman Pat
- Mickey Mouse / Donald Duck in All Disney Productions (1950s-1970s)
- Bugs Bunny / Daffy Duck / Sylvester in Looney Tunes (1950s-1970s)
- Asterix in Asterix the Gaul
- Asterix in Asterix and Cleopatra
- Fritz the Cat in Fritz the Cat (1973 redub)
- The Mouse in Goliath II

=== Live action ===
- Victor Shakapopulis in What's New Pussycat?
- Isaac Davis in Manhattan
- Boris Grushenko in Love and Death
- Howard Prince in The Front
- Leonard Zelig in Zelig
- Victor / Fabrizio / The Fool / Sperm in Everything You Always Wanted to Know About Sex* (*But Were Afraid to Ask)
- Sandy Bates in Stardust Memories
- Virgil Starkwell in Take the Money and Run
- Miles Monroe in Sleeper
- Fielding Mellish in Bananas
- Alvy Singer in Annie Hall
- Mickey Sachs in Hannah and Her Sisters
- Sheldon Mills in New York Stories
- Andrew in A Midsummer Night's Sex Comedy
- Danny Rose in Broadway Danny Rose
- Allan Felix in Play It Again, Sam
- Joe in Radio Days
- Cliff Stern in Crimes and Misdemeanors
- Gabe Roth in Husbands and Wives
- Lenny Weinrib in Mighty Aphrodite
- Kleinman in Shadows and Fog
- Nick Fifer in Scenes from a Mall
- Larry Lipton in Manhattan Murder Mystery
- Ray Winkler in Small Time Crooks
- Joe Berlin in Everyone Says I Love You
- Audition Director in The Impostors
- Harry Block in Deconstructing Harry
- Tex Cowley in Picking Up the Pieces
- C.W. Briggs in The Curse of the Jade Scorpion
- Val Waxman in Hollywood Ending
- David Dobel in Anything Else
- Sid Waterman in Scoop
- Dr. Strangelove in Dr. Strangelove
- Inspector Clouseau in Revenge of the Pink Panther
- Sidney Wang in Murder by Death
- Sir Guy Grand in The Magic Christian
- Sam in The Optimists of Nine Elms
- Robert Danvers in There's a Girl in My Soup
- Dr. Frederick Frankenstein in Young Frankenstein
- Phillipe / Claude in Start the Revolution Without Me
- Quackser Fortune in Quackser Fortune Has a Cousin in the Bronx
- The Fox in The Little Prince
- Sigerson Holmes in The Adventure of Sherlock Holmes' Smarter Brother
- Willy Wonka in Willy Wonka & the Chocolate Factory
- Rudy Hickman in The World's Greatest Lover
- George Caldwell in Silver Streak
- Avram Belinski in The Frisco Kid
- Michael Jordon in Hanky Panky
- Skip Donahue in Stir Crazy
- Gene Bergman in Something Wilder
- Mork in Mork & Mindy (seasons 1–2)
- Bert / Mr. Dawes Sr. in Mary Poppins
- Louis Tully in Ghostbusters, Ghostbusters II
- Albin Mougeotte in La Cage aux Folles, La Cage aux Folles II, La Cage aux Folles 3: The Wedding
- Otarius in Good King Dagobert
- Leon De Paris in The Wolf and the Lamb
- Gino in Merry Christmas... Happy New Year
- Joy Boy in Pocketful of Miracles
- Max Meen in The Great Race
- J. Algernon Hawthorne / Cab Driver in It's a Mad, Mad, Mad, Mad World
- Guy Gisborne in Robin and the 7 Hoods
- Horatio Bixbee in Penelope
- Milt Manville in Luv
- Commissioner Juve in Fantomas Unleashed
- Victor Pivert in The Mad Adventures of Rabbi Jacob
- Charles Firbank in How to Murder Your Wife
- Harold "Tiger" in A Guide for the Married Man
- Police Inspector in Seven Times Seven
- Police Commissioner Green in How to Kill 400 Duponts
- Dr. Longstreet in The Abominable Dr. Phibes
- Adenoid Hynkel / Jewish Barber in The Great Dictator (1972 redub)
- John Christie in 10 Rillington Place
- George in Cul-de-sac
- Red Cloak in Eyes Wide Shut
- Alfred in The Fearless Vampire Killers
- John Correli in Basic Instinct
- Rufus T. Firefly in Duck Soup
- Ronald Kornblow in A Night in Casablanca (1970 redub)
- Toymaker in Chitty Chitty Bang Bang
- McTarry / Hadley in Casino Royale
- Lab Technician Jennings in Revenge of the Creature
- The Riddler in Batman
- George Harrison in A Hard Day's Night,Help!
- Carl Sweetchuck in Police Academy 2: Their First Assignment
- Warren in Cracking Up
- Bo Hopper in Hardly Working
- Lucien Fougasse in The Gendarme Gets Married
- Gardien in The Mona Lisa Has Been Stolen
- Herbie Kazlminsky in 1941
- Edwin Stewart in The Chase
- Max in Midnight Express
- Dave Hastings in The Sons of Katie Elder
- Leonard in North by Northwest
- P. R. Deltoid in A Clockwork Orange
- Earnest Goodbody in How I Won the War
- Sir Reginald Dongby in And the Ship Sails On
- Mr. Bernstein in Citizen Kane (1965 redub)

== Work as dubbing director ==
- BBC Television Shakespeare
- Crimes and Misdemeanors
- Ghostbusters II
- Hannah and Her Sisters
- Police Academy 3: Back in Training
- Police Academy 4: Citizens on Patrol
- Police Academy 5: Assignment: Miami Beach
