= El Rojo (film) =

1966 western film

- Directed by: Leopoldo Savona
- Written by: Roberto Amoroso; Leopoldo Savona; Mario Casacci; Roberto Gianviti; Rate Furlan
- Starring: Richard Harrison; Nieves Navarro
- Cinematography: Aldo Giordani
- Edited by: Tatiana Casini Morigi
- Music by: Benedetto Ghiglia
- Release date: 1966
- Country: Italy

El Rojo (Spanish: Texas el Rojo) is a 1966 Italian-Spanish Spaghetti Western film co-written and directed by Leopoldo Savona and starring Richard Harrison.

== Cast ==
- Richard Harrison as Donald 'El Rojo' Sorensen
- Nieves Navarro as Consuelo
- Piero Lulli as Lasky
- Mirko Ellis as Navarro
- Franco Ressel as Wallace
- Andrea Aureli as Ortega
- Raf Baldassarre as Ramon
- Annie Gorassini as Flo
- Rita Klein as Pamela
- José Jaspe as José Garibaldi
- Angelo Boscariol as Nero Burt
- John Bartha as the Judge
- Tom Felleghy as the Sheriff
- Pietro Tordi as Saloon Customer

== Production ==
According to the assistant director Gianfranco Baldanello, the film was started by veteran director Mario Costa, which was replaced by Savona after one week because of his on set fights with leading actor Richard Harrison. It was shot between Cinecittà and La Pedriza.

== Reception ==
Rewieving the film, Italian critic Davide Pulici described the film as "a solid film built on a traditional structure", but categorized it among the "borderline" spaghetti westerns, because of the giallo structure and mystery elements, the strangeness of various characters and situations, and the inventiveness of the death scenes, particularly that of Mirko Ellis.
