= John Bartha =

Hungarian actor (1915–1991)

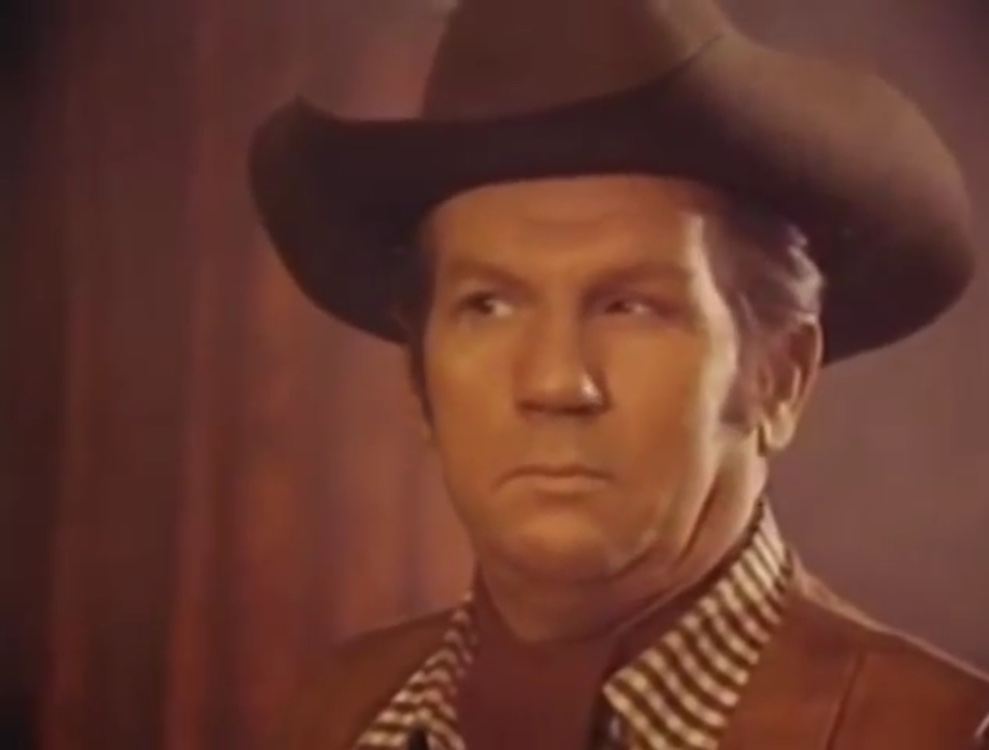
- John Bartha on I lunghi giorni dell'odio (1968)
- Born: Bartha János; 6 February 1915; Csíkszereda, Austria-Hungary
- Died: 7 March 1991 (aged 76); Budapest, Hungary
- Occupation: Actor
- Years active: 1948–1981
- Spouse: Erzsi Paál (?– 24 June 1973; her death)

Bartha János (6 February 1915 – 7 March 1991), better known as John Bartha, was a Hungarian actor who appeared primarily in spaghetti Westerns in the 1960s and 1970s. He is probably most recognizable in western cinema for his role as the Sheriff who captured Tuco in the 1966 Sergio Leone film, The Good, the Bad and the Ugly.

From the early 1940s, he performed in rural theater companies and between 1948 and 1956 in theaters in Budapest. He made nearly 100 appearances in film between 1949 and 1981. Bartha died in Budapest on 7 March 1991, at the age of 76.

== Filmography ==
- Mickey Magnate (1949) - One of the servants
- Gala Suit (1949) - One of the counts at the ball
- Full Steam Ahead (1951) - László Román
- Storm (1952) - Flautist, Tractor Driver, and one of the reapers
- Állami Áruház (1952) - A man who walking in the boathouse with an oar on his shoulder
- A biztonságos közlekedésért (1953) - tipsy driver
- Föltámadott a tenger (1953) - Austrian soldier who says "the emperor has escaped"
- Kiskrajcár (1953) - Simics, member of the Madaras brigade
- Körúti tánc (1954) - The man who delivers the message to Péter Kovács
- Accident (1955) - The policeman who brings Péter Ágh to the trial
- Springtime in Budapest (1955) - One of the gendarmes
- Leila and Gábor (1955) - Gül Baba's servant of African descent
- Tűz a határban (1955) - who presents the awards
- The Bridge of Life (1955) - One of the bridge construction workers
- A legokosabb ember (1956) - Miner, member of Bálint Szabó's brigade
- Eltüsszentett birodalom (1956) - soldier
- The Football Star (1956) - Soccer player
- By Order of the Emperor (1956) - The Austrian soldier who trying to trap Laczkovics
- Nerone '71 (1962) - Uomo che interroga le ragazze
- I Am Semiramis (1963) - Althar
- Samson and the Sea Beast (1963)
- The Executioner of Venice (1963) - Messere Leonardo
- The Lion of St. Mark (1963) - Conte Fieschi
- The Pink Panther (1963) - Policeman
- I maniaci (1964) - Literary critic segment "La Parolaccia"
- Man of the Cursed Valley (1964) - Padre Ryan
- The Revenge of Spartacus (1964) - Roman Soldier
- Oh! Those Most Secret Agents! (1964) - Doctor
- The Seven from Texas (1964) - Dan
- Challenge of the Gladiator (1965) - Roman Messenger
- Jesse James' Kid (1965) - Federal
- Our Man in Jamaica (1965)
- Hands of a Gunfighter (1965) - Sheriff Fred
- The Relentless Four (1965) - Rancher John
- A Man Could Get Killed (1966) - Ludmar
- The Man Who Laughs (1966)
- Due mafiosi contro Al Capone (1966) - Police Chief
- Ringo and His Golden Pistol (1966) - Bernard, Barangos Alcalde
- War of the Planets (1966)
- Il pianeta errante (1966) - Dr. Smith
- Massacre Time (1966) - Carradine
- Arizona Colt (1966) - Soldier Playing Cards with Two Comrades at Stagecoach Station
- El Rojo (1966) (1966) - Judge
- Target for Killing (1966) - Organisationsmitglied, das Henry Perkins entführt
- Django Shoots First (1966) - Thomas Garvin
- The Good, the Bad and the Ugly (1966) - Sheriff
- El Cisco (1967)
- Dirty Heroes (1967) - Hassler's Subordinate
- La morte viene dal pianeta Aytin (1967) - Dr. George
- Master Stroke (1967) - Movie Producer
- Killer Caliber .32 (1967) - Parker
- Son of Django (1967) - Sheriff
- Il tempo degli avvoltoi (1967) - Sheriff
- Mission Stardust (1967) - General Ron
- The Dirty Outlaws (1967) - Wallace
- Your Turn to Die (1967) - Hotel Detective
- Operation St. Peter's (1967) - Man in flashback
- Seven Times Seven (1968) - Coal-Mining Prisoner
- Se vuoi vivere... spara! (1968) - Businessman
- L'oro di Londra (1968) - Thomas
- Acid (Delirio dei sensi) (1968) - James Burton
- Johnny Hamlet (1968) - Owner of Acting Troupe
- Long Days of Hate (1968) - Sheriff
- A Minute to Pray, a Second to Die (1968) - Townsman
- Hell in Normandy (1968) - Ted Bancroft - American General
- A Sky Full of Stars for a Roof (1968) - Mr. Lawrence
- The Black Sheep (1968) - DDR Ambassador
- Carogne si nasce (1968) - Tex Thomas
- No Graves on Boot Hill (1968) - Saloon owner
- Kill Them All and Come Back Alone (1968) - Prison Camp Captain
- Indovina chi viene a merenda? (1969) - German Sergeant
- La battaglia del deserto (1969) - German Tank Operator
- Uccidete Rommel (1969) - Colonel Braddock
- Sabata (1969) - Daugherty City Sheriff
- The Conspiracy of Torture (1969) - 2nd Excellency
- Sartana the Gravedigger (1969) - Sheriff
- The Adventures of Gerard (1970)
- I Am Sartana, Trade Your Guns for a Coffin (1970) - Sheriff
- Terzo Canale - Avventura a Montecarlo (1970) - Truck Seller
- I due maggiolini più matti del mondo (1970) - Anastasia
- They Call Me Hallelujah (1971) - Shot Man
- His Name Was King (1971) - Sheriff Roberts
- Return of Sabata (1972) - Sheriff
- Il clan dei due Borsalini (1971) - Il gioielliere
- The Eroticist (1972) - Film editor
- Two Brothers in Trinity (1972) - Carson
- The Night of the Devils (1972) - Sawmill Owner
- Le calde notti del Decameron (1972) - Bishop
- Man of the East (1972) - Jeremiah
- Don't Torture a Duckling (1972) - Policeman
- Sotto a chi tocca! (1972) - Head of Mission
- The Master Touch (1972) - Murdered Security Guard
- The Sicilian Connection (1972) - Inspector
- Continuavano a chiamarli... er più e er meno (1972) - Collector
- Fuzzy the Hero (1973) - Sheriff
- My Darling Slave (1973) - Car saloon employee
- The Great Kidnapping (1973) - Policeman
- Mean Frank and Crazy Tony (1973) - District Attorney
- Anna, quel particolare piacere (1973) - Gerli
- White Fang (1973) - Mountie who frees Chester
- Daisy Miller (1974) - Hotel Receptionist Rome
- Challenge to White Fang (1974) - Mountie Sergeant
- Eyeball (1975) - Mr. Hamilton
- Prima ti suono e poi ti sparo (1975) - Towns Representant
- Violent Rome (1975) - Junk Yard Worker
- Dracula in the Provinces (1975) - Concierge
- We Are No Angels (1975) - Sheriff
- Salon Kitty (1976) - Gestapo Agent
- Everything Happens to Me (1980) - Police Chief
- Cannibal Ferox (1981) - Mafioso

== His grave ==
John Bartha remains were buried in the New Public Cemetery, Budapest, Hungary. The exact number of the plot of the grave: 74/1-1-40.

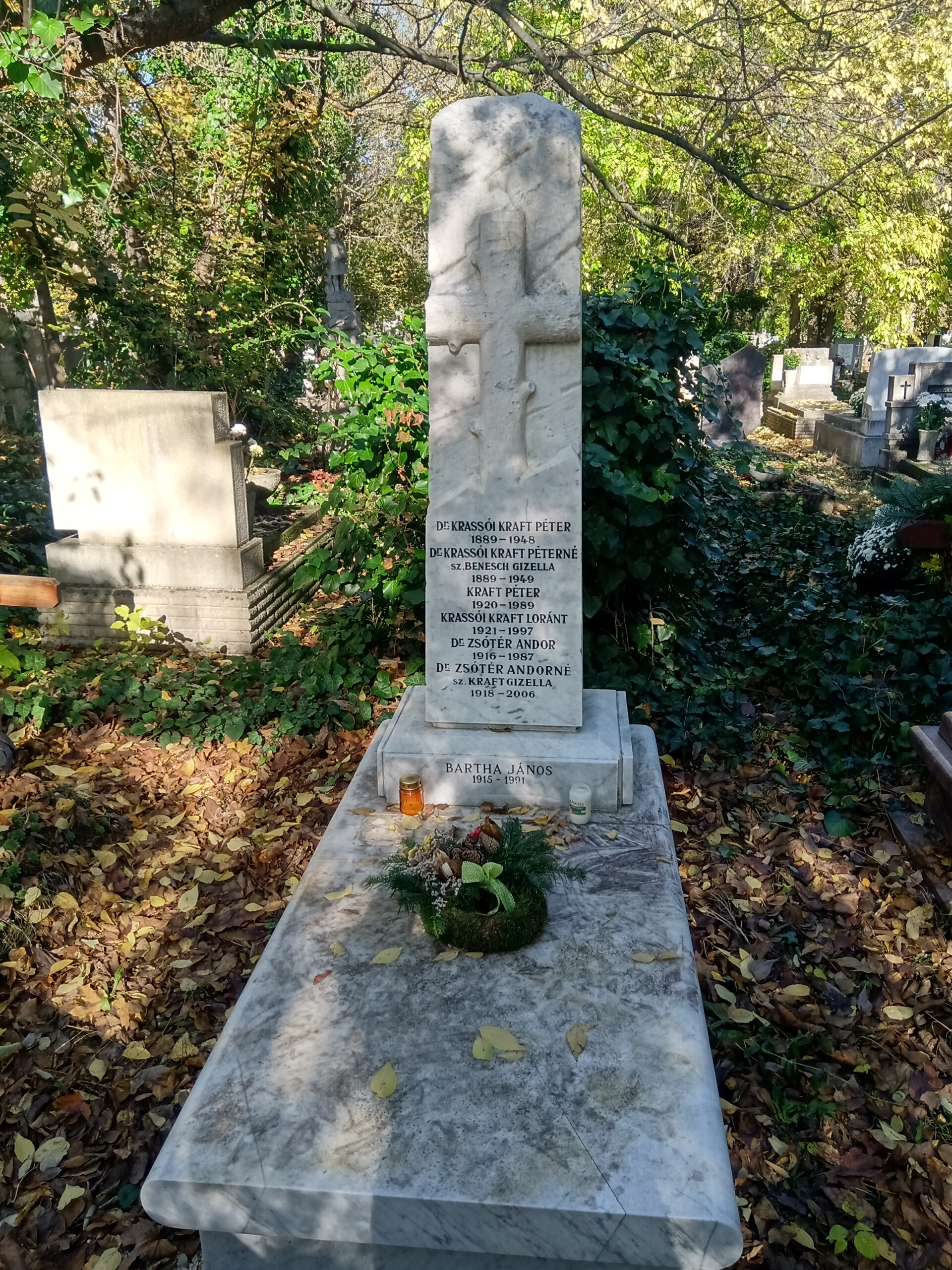
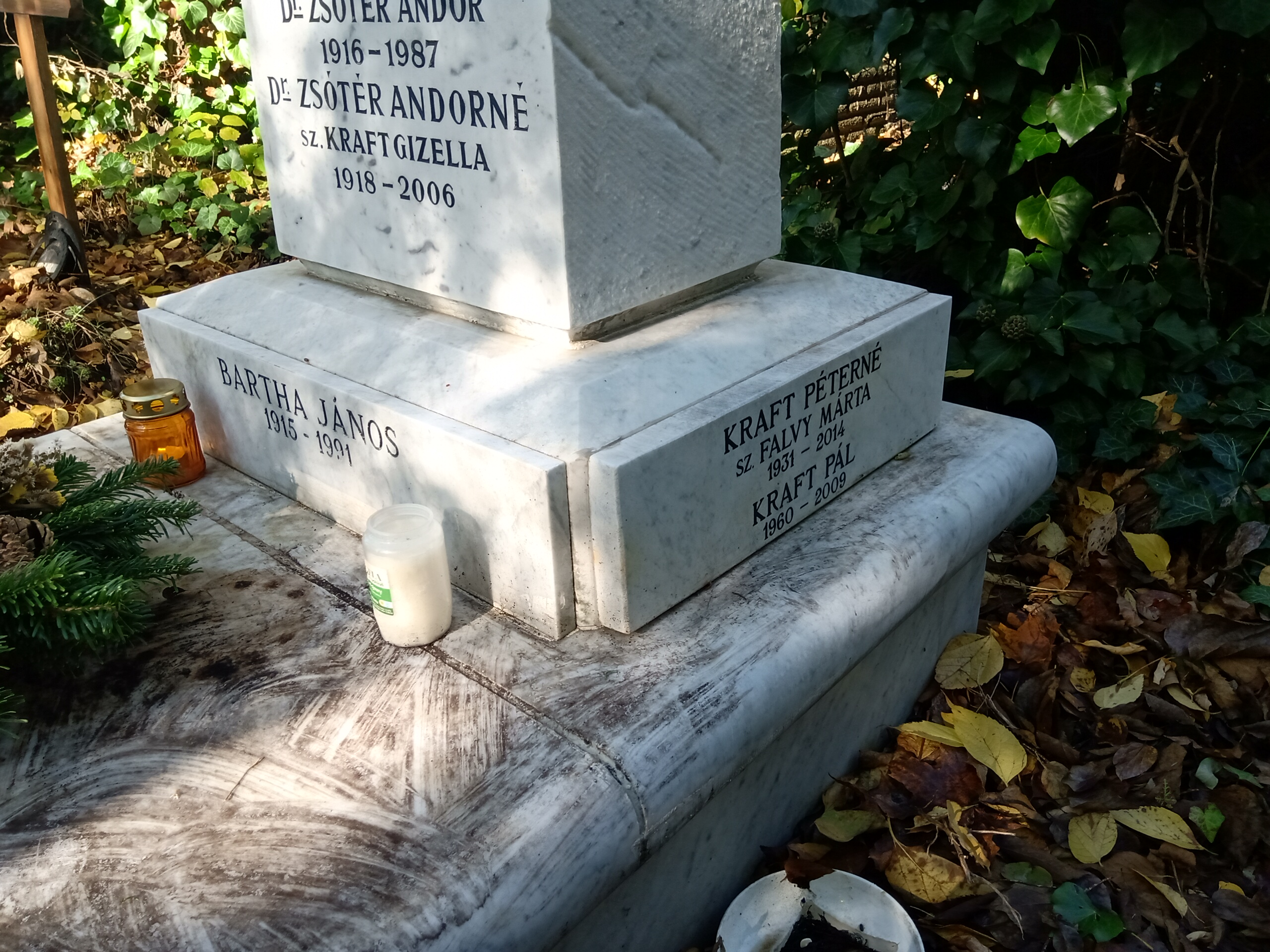
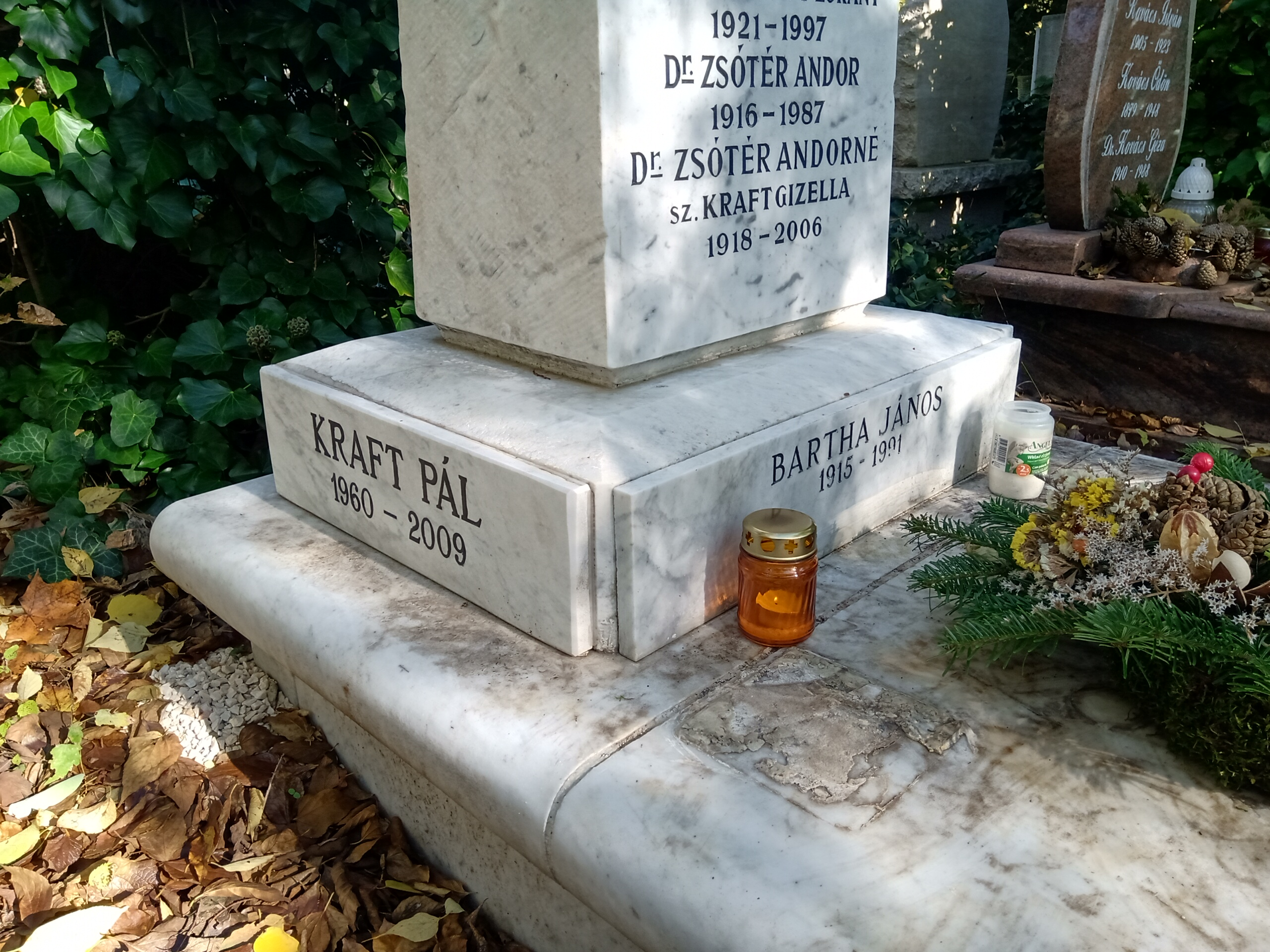

== Bibliography ==
- Elley, Derek (1977). Cowie, Peter (ed.). World Filmography: 1967. Fairleigh Dickinson Univ Press. p. 688. ISBN 9780498015656.
