= The Sign of the Coyote =

1963 film

- Directed by: Mario Caiano
- Written by: Mario Caiano; José Mallorquí
- Produced by: Aldo U. Passalacqua; Norberto Soliño
- Starring: Fernando Casanova; María Luz Galicia; Jesús Tordesillas
- Cinematography: Aldo Greci; Ricardo Torres
- Edited by: Renato Cinquini
- Music by: Francesco De Masi; Manuel Parada
- Production companies: Copercines, Cooperativa Cinematográfica; Hispamer Films; Produzioni Europee Associate
- Distributed by: Exclusivas Floralva Distribución
- Release date: 11 May 1963
- Running time: 80 minutes
- Countries: Italy; Spain
- Language: Italian

The Sign of the Coyote (Italian: Il segno del coyote) is a 1963 Italian-Spanish western adventure film directed by Mario Caiano and starring Fernando Casanova, María Luz Galicia and Jesús Tordesillas. It is considered by some critics to be the first Italian western.

The film's sets were designed by the art director Piero Filippone.

== Plot ==
Following the Conquest of California, a local adventurer battles against the new American authorities and their unjust actions against the people.

== Cast ==
- Fernando Casanova as César de Echagüe / El Coyote
- María Luz Galicia as Leonora Acevedo
- Jesús Tordesillas as Don Cesar's Father
- Fernando Sancho as Lugones Brother
- José Jaspe as Lugones Brother
- Fernando Hilbeck as Joaquim Gallardo
- Félix Fernández as Don Goyo
- Paola Barbara as Mme Teodora Acevedo
- Mario Feliciani as Governor Parker
- Giulia Rubini as Beatrice
- Arturo Dominici as Judge Clemens
- Giuseppe Fortis as Wilkes
- Piero Lulli as Lenny
- Andrea Scotti as Don Goyo's Son
- Maruja Tamayo as Carmen de Echague
- José Marco as Captain Grey
- Miguel del Castillo as Julian
- Santiago Rivero as Dr. Valdez
- Alfonso Rojas as Sergeant Hogg
- José Villasante as Ciudadano
- Antonio Padilla as Lenny Henchman
- Luis Rivera as Medico Capitan
- Maria Carmen Encalado as Rocio
- Nadia Marlowa as Lupita
- Raf Baldassarre as Lenny Henchman
- Joe Kamel as Hernando Lugones

== Bibliography ==
- Ercolani, Eugenio (2019-08-21). Darkening the Italian Screen: Interviews with Genre and Exploitation Directors Who Debuted in the 1950s and 1960s. McFarland. ISBN 978-1-4766-6738-6.
