= Ty Hardin =

American actor (1930–2017)

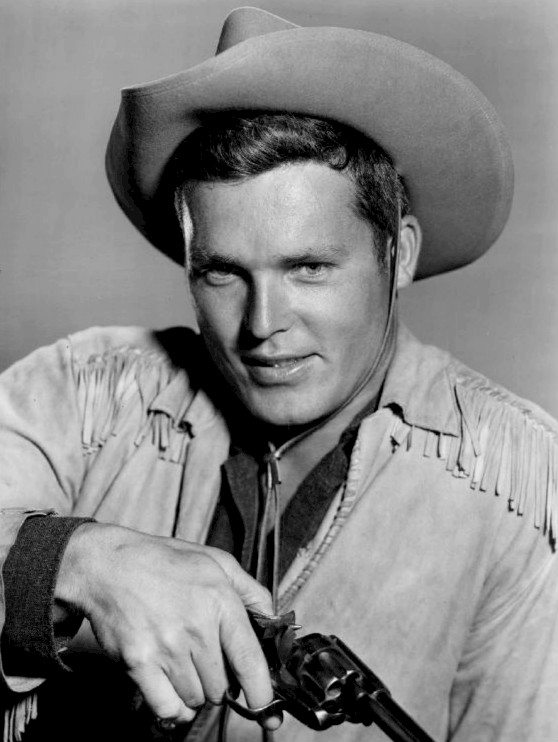
- Hardin in Bronco, 1958
- Born: Orison Whipple Hungerford, Jr. January 1, 1930; New York City, New York, U.S.
- Died: August 3, 2017 (aged 87); Huntington Beach, California, U.S.
- Occupation: Actor
- Years active: 1958–1992
- Spouse(s): Andra Martin (m. 1958; div. 1960) Marlene Schmidt (m. 1962; div. 1965) Jenny Atkins (m. 1971; div. 1974) Judy McNeill (m. 1978; div. 2007) Caroline Hardin (m. 2007)
- Military career
- Allegiance: United States
- Branch: United States Army
- Conflicts: Korean War

Ty Hardin (born Orison Whipple Hungerford Jr.; January 1, 1930 – August 3, 2017) was an American actor. He is best known as the star of ABC/Warner Bros. Western television series Bronco (1958–1962).

== Early and personal life ==
Orison Whipple Hungerford, Jr. was born on January 1, 1930, in New York City, to Orison Whipple Hungerford, Sr., an acoustical engineer, and Gwendolyn Winifred (née Burnett). He was raised in Texas, after his family moved to Austin when he was six months old. His parents separated shortly after the move, and his father abandoned the family about four years later.

He graduated in 1949 from Lamar High School in Houston. A football scholarship enabled him to attend Blinn College in Brenham, Texas, for one year, and then, he went to Dallas Bible Institute for one semester. He served in the United States Army during Korean War. He was commissioned after attending Officer Candidate School in Fort Monmouth, New Jersey, and he became a pilot of Forward Observer O-1 Bird Dog liaison aircraft. He attained the rank of first lieutenant. After his return from service, he began taking courses at Texas A&M University in College Station on a scholarship under Coach Bear Bryant, for whom he played tight end.

In 1958, he legally changed his name from Orison Whipple Hungerford Jr., to his stage name, Ty Hardin. He ascribed the change to a matter of convenience.

From 1962 to 1965, he was married to his second wife, Marlene Schmidt, 1961 Miss Universe and German beauty queen, who later worked in a movie industry; they had one daughter. At the time of his death, Hardin lived with his eighth wife, Caroline, in Huntington Beach, California.

== Acting career ==
=== Paramount – "Ty Hungerford" ===
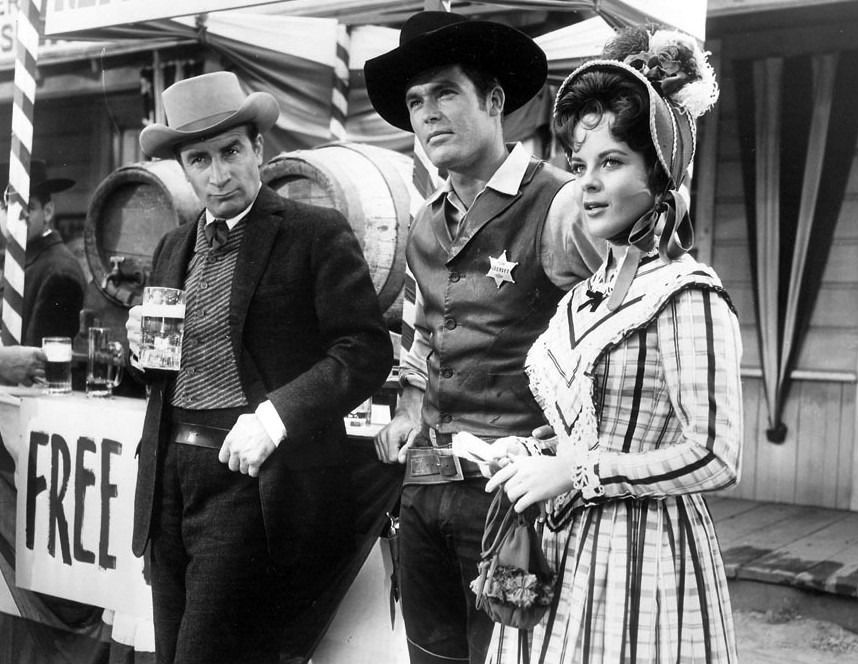
John Beradino, Hardin, and Anne Helm in 1961

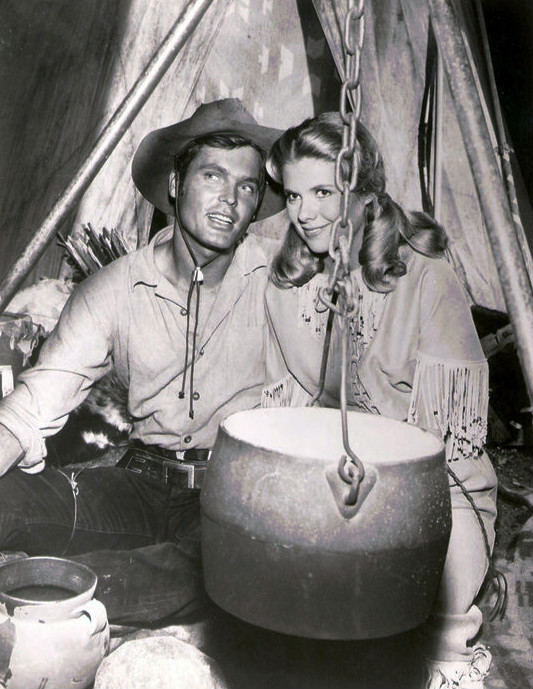
Hardin and Nina Shipman in Bronco

A Paramount Pictures talent scout discovered Hardin while he was attending a costume party. He had rented revolvers from Western Costume, a motion-picture costume-rental company.

By 1957, Hardin acquired the services of agent Henry Willson and made his way to Hollywood, where he was put under contract by Paramount Pictures.

Initially billed as "Ty Hungerford", he made various minor appearances in several Paramount films, such as The Space Children (1958), As Young as We Are (1958) I Married a Monster from Outer Space (1958), The Buccaneer (1958), and Last Train from Gun Hill (1959).

=== Warner Bros. years – Bronco ===
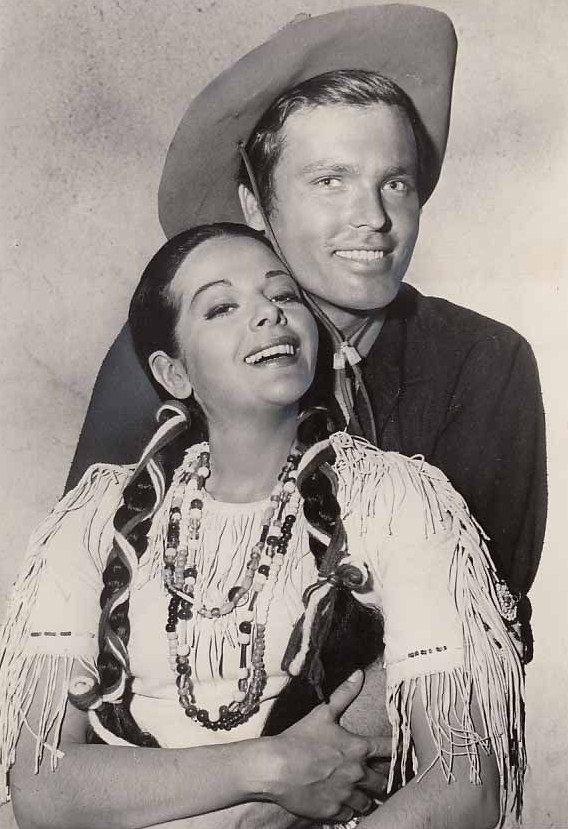
Hardin with Yvette Dugay in another publicity image for Bronco

Hardin tried to obtain a support role in the 1959 film Rio Bravo that had been promised to singer Ricky Nelson. John Wayne reportedly saw Hardin while visiting a film set at Paramount and was impressed with Hardin's appearance. Wayne introduced him to Howard Hawks and William T. Orr at Warner Bros. Television; they bargained for his seven-year contract and he moved to Warner Bros., which changed his stage surname to "Hardin", reminiscent of the Texas gunfighter John Wesley Hardin. He attended actors' school at Warner Bros. and landed small parts in various Warner productions.

When Clint Walker walked out on his ABC series Cheyenne in 1958 during a contract dispute with Warner Bros., Hardin got his big break. Warner bought out Hardin's contract from Paramount Studios and installed him into Cheyenne for the remainder of the season, as the country cousin Bronco Layne.

Walker and Warner Bros. came to terms after the season ended, but Hardin had made such a big hit on the show that Jack L. Warner gave him his own series, Bronco, under the Cheyenne title. Bronco alternated weeks with Sugarfoot, starring Will Hutchins, and Cheyenne for four years. The series ran from 1958 to 1962. Hardin guest-starred on other Warner Bros. shows such as Maverick and 77 Sunset Strip.

Warner Bros. cast Hardin in some films such as Merrill's Marauders (1962), where he was second-billed to Jeff Chandler; The Chapman Report (1962); the spring break film Palm Springs Weekend (1963); PT 109; and Wall of Noise (1963). According to Filmink "This was a pretty good run of films for Hardin. However, he didn’t really catch fire with film audiences. Hardin was an amiable, handsome TV series actor but that was about it – there was something anonymous about him."

=== International films ===
When his contract expired, Hardin did Guys and Dolls in stock. He then left Hollywood to seek opportunity overseas as his series aired all over the world. Like many other American actors, Hardin traveled to Europe, where he made several spaghetti Westerns, including Man of the Cursed Valley (1964).

He appeared in a war film Battle of the Bulge (1965) shot in Spain, and the Western Savage Pampas (1966). He had the lead in Death on the Run (1967). He supported Joan Crawford in Berserk! (1967) and played Captain Reno in Custer of the West (1967) shot in Spain. He had the lead in Ragan (1968) and One Step to Hell (1968).

=== Riptide ===
Hardin starred in the 1968–1969 Australian television series Riptide, in which he played an American running a charter boat company along the eastern seaboard of Australia. During the making of the series he memorably told a journalist, "I'm really a very humble man. Not a day goes by that I don't thank God for my looks, my stature and my talent."

He returned to Europe to star in The Last Rampage (1970), Quel maledetto giorno della resa dei conti (1971), and Drummer of Vengeance (1971). He was in a 1970 German television series called On the Trail of Johnny Hilling, Boor and Billy, shown in the former West Germany. Hardin was in The Last Rebel (1971) Acquasanta Joe (1971), and You're Jinxed, Friend You've Met Sacramento (1972) and a small role in Avanti! (1972).

In 1974, he was arrested in Spain for drug trafficking and spent time in prison.

=== Later career ===
Hardin's later appearances included Rooster: Spurs of Death! (1977), Fire (1977), and Image of the Beast (1980) as well as episodes of TV shows such as The Love Boat. He was in The Zoo Gang (1985) and Red River (1988) and had a lead in Born Killer (1989). Hardin could be seen in Bad Jim (1992), and Rescue Me (1992).

== Death ==
Hardin died of natural causes at his home in Huntington Beach, California, on August 3, 2017, at the age of 87.

== Arizona Patriots ==
After difficulties with the Internal Revenue Service, Hardin founded a tax protest movement in Prescott, Arizona. In 1982, the movement became known as the Arizona Patriots. The group first gained public notice by its efforts to clog the Arizona court system with lawsuits in the 1980s, a tactic also employed by Posse Comitatus.

== Partial filmography ==
- The Space Children (1958) (with Jackie Coogan) as Sentry
- As Young as We Are (1958) as Roy Nielson
- I Married a Monster from Outer Space (1958) (with Tom Tryon and Gloria Talbott) as Mac Brody
- The Buccaneer (1958) as Soldier (uncredited)
- Last Train from Gun Hill (1959) (with Kirk Douglas and Anthony Quinn) as Cowboy Loafer (uncredited)
- Cheyenne (1961, Episode: "Duel at Judas Basin") as Bronco Layne
- Merrill's Marauders (1962) (with Jeff Chandler) as 2nd Lt. Lee Stockton
- The Chapman Report (1962) (with Jane Fonda) as Ed Kraski
- PT 109 (1963) (with Cliff Robertson as John F. Kennedy) as Ensign Leonard J. Thom
- Wall of Noise (1963) (with Suzanne Pleshette and Dorothy Provine) as Joel Tarrant
- Palm Springs Weekend (1963) as Doug 'Stretch' Fortune
- Man of the Cursed Valley (1964) as Johnny Walscott
- Savage Pampas (1965) (with Robert Taylor) as Miguel Carreras
- Battle of the Bulge (1965) (with Henry Fonda) as Lt. Schumacher
- Death on the Run (1967) as Jason
- Custer of the West (1967) (with Robert Shaw) as Maj. Marcus Reno
- Berserk! (1967) (with Joan Crawford) as Frank Hawkins
- Ragan (1968) as Lee Ragan
- King of Africa (1968) as Lt. King Edwards
- Rekvijem (1970) as Major
- Terrible Day of the Big Gundown (1971) as Jonathan Benton
- Drummer of Vengeance (1971) as The Stranger
- The Last Rebel (1971) as The Sheriff
- Holy Water Joe (1971) as Jeff Donovan
- Sei iellato, amico hai incontrato Sacramento (1972) as Jack Thompson 'Sacramento'
- Avanti! (1972) as Helicopter Pilot (uncredited)
- Arpad - Zwei Teufelskerle räumen auf (1975)
- Fire! (1977, TV Movie) as Walt Fleming
- Rooster: Spurs of Death! (1977) as The Texan
- Image of the Beast (1980) as The Missionary
- The Zoo Gang (1985) as Dean Haskell
- Born Killer (1989) as Sheriff Stone
- Bad Jim (1990) as Tom Jefferd
- Rescue Me (1992) as Sheriff Gilbert
- Head Over Spurs in Love (2011) as Colonel Sanders (final film role)
