= The Beast of Babylon Against the Son of Hercules =

- Directed by: Siro Marcellini
- Written by: Gian Paolo Callegari; Siro Marcellini; Albert Valentin
- Produced by: Albino Morandini
- Starring: Gordon Scott
- Cinematography: Pier Ludovico Pavoni
- Music by: Carlo Franci
- Release date: 1963
- Language: Italian

The Beast of Babylon Against the Son of Hercules (Italian: L'eroe di Babilonia, French: Héros de Babylone, also known as Heroes of Babylon, Hero of Babylon and Goliath, King of Slaves) is a 1963 Italian-French peplum film written and directed by Siro Marcellini and starring Gordon Scott.

The film is a fictionalized depiction of the Fall of Babylon (539 BCE), and depicts the historical rulers Belshazzar (as Balthazar) and Cyrus the Great (as Zairus).

== Plot ==
When the high-born Nippur returns to Babylon following a long stay in Persia, he rescues slave-girl Tamira from the soldiers of the evil usurper, Balthazar. Nippur then pays a courtesy visit to Balthazar's court where he meets the high-priestess Ura who has ambitions to become queen and who casts a lustful eye on this new visitor.

Later, shocked by the cruelty of Balthazar's reign and influenced by a group of rebels, Nippur interrupts a fiery sacrifice of virgins. Forced to flee Babylon, Nippur—wounded by an arrow in the back—is restored to health by the forces of the Persian king, Cyrus, who are marching toward Babylon. Nippur slips back into Babylon where he is captured and chained to a wall inside a dungeon.

Using his great strength, Nippur breaks free, rescues Tamira before she can be sacrificed, and engages Balthazar in a sword fight to-the-death. The Persian army now arrives and Cyrus, before returning home, sees to it that Nippur sits on the throne of Babylon with the faithful Tamira by his side.

== Cast ==
- Gordon Scott as Nippur
- Geneviève Grad as Tamira
- Andrea Scotti as Namar
- Célina Cély as Agar
- Moira Orfei as Ura
- Mario Petri as Zairus
- Piero Lulli as Balthazar
- Andrea Aureli as Anarsi
- Giuseppe Addobbati as Licardius
- Harold Bradley as Mursuk
- Oreste Lionello
- Consalvo Dell'Arti
- Renato Malavasi
