= Rafael Albaicín =

Spanish actor (1919–1981)

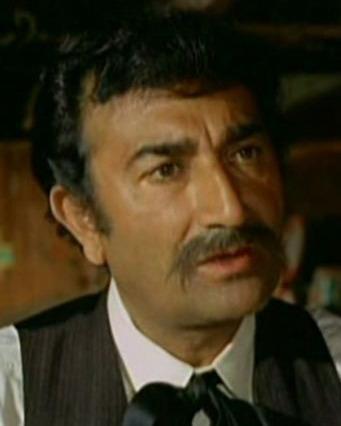
- Rafael Albaicín as the bartender in Lo voglio morto (1968)
- Born: Ignacio Rafael García Escudero; 5 June 1919; Madrid, Spain
- Died: 3 September 1981 (aged 62)
- Occupation(s): Matador and film actor
- Mother: Agustina

Ignacio Rafael García Escudero (5 June 1919 – 3 September 1981), known as Rafael Albaicín, was a Spanish matador and film actor.

In 1948 he began as matador in Las Ventas, taught by Cagancho. He also played the piano and violin, and he designed his traje de luces. As an actor, he appeared in Shéhérazade (1963), Vamos a matar, compañeros and The Ceremony. He also played himself in Watch Out, We're Mad! (1974), a bandit in Navajo Joe (1966), and Alberto in Catlow (1971),

He died on 3 September 1981 at the age of 62 in Madrid.

== Filmography ==
- La fiesta sigue (1948) as Rafael
- María Antonia 'La Caramba' (1951)
- Siempre Carmen (1953) as Un guappo
- Noches andaluzas (1954) as Bandit
- El fenómeno (1956) as Mauro
- Torero por alegrías (1957) as Miguel Romero
- El hombre que viajaba despacito (1957) as Gitano
- Mensajeros de paz (1957)
- Polvorilla (1957)
- Patio andaluz (1958) as José Reyes
- Tierra brutal (1961) as González
- Scheherezade (1963) as Leader of kidnappers
- El precio de la muerte (1963) as Waiter
- Encrucijada mortal (1963) as 7th gendarme
- El hombre del valle maldito (1964)
- Fuerte perdido (1964) as Apache
- El séptimo de caballería (1965) as Chief Wild Horse
- Los cien caballeros (1964) as Mohammed (uncredited)
- Dulcinea del Toboso (1964)
- Dos caraduras en Texas (1965) as Benito Cocos (uncredited)
- Don Quijote von der Mancha (1965, TV Mini-Series)
- Sangre sobre Texas (1965) as Oso gris
- Plazo para morir (1965) as Auctioneer
- Trampa para un forajido (1966) as Bandit (uncredited)
- Django (1966) as Member of Hugo's Gang #1
- Siete pistolas para Timothy (1966) as Grey Eagle
- Operación Lady Chaplin (1966) as Rodriguez - the false monk
- Héroes a la fuerza (1966)
- Navajo Joe (1966) as Mexican Scalphunter
- El secreto del capitán O'Hara (1966)
- Un hombre vino a matar (1967) as José
- La casa de las mil muñecas (1967) as Police Inspector (uncredited)
- 15 horcas para un asesino (1967) as Manuel
- Un tren para Durango (1968) as Lobo Henchman (uncredited)
- Winchester: Uno entre mil (1968)
- La hora del coraje (1968) as Ignacio, Carranza's Man
- Vivo para matarte (1968) as Minor Role (uncredited)
- Mercenarios sin gloria (1969) as Chief Arab at Oasis
- Que esperen los cuervos (1969)
- Vivos o preferiblemente muertos (1969) as Cowboy on the Train (uncredited)
- Al infierno, gringo (1969) as Indio
- Los tres supermen en la selva (1970) as Sorcerer (uncredited)
- El cóndor (1970) as Officer
- Reza por tu alma... y muere (1970) as Jose
- Los compañeros (1970) as Mongo Henchman (uncredited)
- Caza implacable (1971) as Mexican (uncredited)
- Catlow (1971) as Alberto
- Il lungo giorno della violenza (1971)
- ¡Viva la muerte... tuya! (1971) as Mexican Rider (uncredited)
- La muerte llega arrastrándose (1972)
- Los hijos del día y de la noche (1972) as Don García Henchman (uncredited)
- What Am I Doing in the Middle of a Revolution? (1972)
- La letra escarlata (1973) as Indian
- Charley, el tuerto (1973) as Mexican Leader
- El bruto, el listo y el capitán (1973) as Indian Chief (uncredited)
- Puños, piratas y karate (1973) as Fighter in Tavern (uncredited)
- La orgía nocturna de los vampiros (1973) as Afilador
- Les aventures du capitaine Luckner (1973, TV Series) as Polizeichef
- El chulo (1974)
- Watch Out, We're Mad! (1974)
- The Spikes Gang (1974) as Shopkeeper (uncredited)
- Im Auftrag von Madame (1974, TV Series)
- Cuando los niños vienen de Marsella (1974) as José
- El blanco, el amarillo y el negro (1975) as Comanchero
- No quiero perder la honra (1975)
- País S.A. (1975)
- Una libélula para cada muerto (1975)
- Y le llamaban Robin Hood (1976)
- Cuando los maridos se iban a la guerra (1976)
- Fulanita y sus menganos (1976)
- El hombre que supo amar (1976) as Almuhecín
- La amante perfecta (1976)
- Guerreras verdes (1976) as Juan
- El anacoreta (1976) as Lenteja
- La muerte ronda a Mónica (1976)
- Esposa y amante (1977) as Repartidor de jarrones 2
- El perro (1977)
- Doña Perfecta (1977)
- Curro Jiménez (1977, TV Series) as Don Pedro Romero / Calandria
- Clayton Drumm (1978) as Guard
- Fantasma en el Oeste (1978) as Paco
- El español y los siete pecados capitales (1980, TV Series)
- El liguero mágico (1980) as Cateto
- Yendo hacia ti (1981) as Auction Bidder (uncredited) (final film role)
