= Red Sundown =

1956 film by Jack Arnold

- Directed by: Jack Arnold
- Screenplay by: Martin Berkeley
- Based on: Back Trail by Lewis B. Patten
- Produced by: Albert Zugsmith
- Starring: Rory Calhoun; Martha Hyer; Dean Jagger
- Cinematography: William E. Snyder
- Edited by: Edward Curtiss
- Music by: Hans J. Salter
- Color process: Technicolor
- Production company: Universal-International Pictures
- Distributed by: Universal-International Pictures
- Release date: March 1956
- Running time: 81 minutes
- Country: United States
- Language: English

Red Sundown is a 1956 American Technicolor Western film directed by Jack Arnold and starring Rory Calhoun, Martha Hyer and Dean Jagger. It was produced and distributed by Universal-International Pictures. It is based on the 1956 novel Back Trail by Lewis B. Patten and had the working title Decision At Durango.

== Plot ==
Alec Longmire (Rory Calhoun), a gunfighter, decides to change his ways after nearly losing his life. He reforms, becoming a deputy to Jade Murphy (Dean Jagger), an honest sheriff trapped between warring farmers and cattlemen. He also falls in love with the sheriff's daughter Caroline (Martha Hyer) who despises gunslingers.

== Cast ==
- Rory Calhoun as Longmire
- Martha Hyer as Caroline
- Dean Jagger as Jade Murphy
- Robert Middleton as Rufus Henshaw
- Grant Williams as Chet Swann
- Lita Baron as Maria
- James Millican as Bud Purvis
- Trevor Bardette as Sam Baldwin
- Leo Gordon as Rod Zellman
- David Kasday as Hughie Clore

== Bibliography ==
- Dick, Bernard F. City of Dreams: The Making and Remaking of Universal Pictures. University Press of Kentucky, 2021.ISBN 978-0813120164
- Pitts, Michael R. Western Movies: A Guide to 5,105 Feature Films. McFarland, 2012. ISBN 978-0786463725
