= Lewis B. Patten =

American author (1915–1981)

Lewis Byford Patten (January 13, 1915 – May 22, 1981) was a prolific author of American Western novels, born and died in Denver, Colorado. He often published under the names Lewis Ford, Lee Leighton and Joseph Wayne. He used the last two names when writing in collaboration with Wayne D. Overholser.

== Writing History ==
As can be seen below, between 1952 and 2003, for some 51 years (included are 2 extra years in 2002-2003 after his death to follow through with unfinished publications), Patten was indeed quite prolific. During that time, he penned at least 110 novels and a further 3 collections of short stories all mostly in the 'Western' genre of writing.

That he is not better known as a writer is likely due to the fact that Hollywood movie makers were not exactly beating down his door to turn his many writings into Hollywood movies. Indeed only 2 Hollywood movies credit Patten as a source for their movie, the 1956 Movie Red Sundown, and the 1969 Movie Death of a Gunfighter. The later 1971 Movie Long Live Your Death, which featured the noted actors Eli Wallach and Lynn Redgrave, cheated this unofficial Hollywood boycott of Patten by actually being a non-Hollywood so-called Spaghetti Western. The tragedy of Hollywood movie makers just thumbing their noses at Patten continued with the 1969 Movie The Undefeated starring the then famed actors John Wayne and Rock Hudson, a movie which even failed to credit Patten as an inspiration for this particular major movie - see below under 'Films'.

== Novels ==
- Massacre at White River (1952)
- Gunmen's Grass (1954) (writing as Lewis Ford)
- The Killing (1954)
- Shadow of the Gun (1954)
- Gunsmoke Empire (1955)
- Gunfighter from Montana (1955) (writing as Lewis Ford)
- Gene Autry and the Ghost Riders (1955)
- Back Trail (1956)
- White Warrior (1956)
- Rope Law (1956)
- Massacre at San Pablo (1957)
- Pursuit (1957)
- Showdown at Stony Crest (1957) (writing as Joseph Wayne with Wayne D. Overholser)
- Valley of Violent Men (1957)
- Gun Proud (1957)
- Gene Autry and the Arapaho War Drums (1957)
- Maverick Empire (1957) (writing as Lewis Ford)
- Home Is the Outlaw (1958)
- Five Rode West (1958)
- Sunblade (UK, 1958); also published as Fighting Rawhide (US, 1959)
- Showdown at War Cloud (1958)
- The Adventures of Jim Bowie (1958) (Big Little Book)
- Tomahawk (1958) (writing as Lee Leighton with Wayne D. Overholser)
- The Man Who Rode Alone (1959)
- The Ruthless Men (1959)
- Savage Star (1959)
- Top Man with a Gun (1959)
- Hangman's Country (1960)
- The Gun and the Man (1960) (writing as Joseph Wayne with Wayne D. Overholser)
- Savage Town (1960)
- Range .45 (1960)
- The Angry Horsemen (1961)
- Renegade Gun (1961)
- The Savage Country (1961)
- Law of the Gun (1961)
- Outlaw Canyon (1961)
- Flame in the West (1962)
- The Gold Magnet (1962)
- Savage Vengeance (1962)
- Vengeance Rider (1963)
- The Ruthless Range (1963)
- The Tarnished Star (1963)
- The Scaffold at Hangman's Creek (1963)
- Guns at Gray Butte (1963)
- The Guilty Guns (1963)
- Wagons East! (1964)
- Ride for Vengeance (1964)
- Proudly They Die (1964)
- Giant on Horseback (1964)
- The Killer from Yuma (1964)
- The Arrogant Guns (1965)
- Deputy from Furnace Creek (1966)
- The Odds against Circle L (1966)
- Prodigal Gunfighter (1966)
- No God in Saguaro (1966)
- Death Waited at Rialto Creek (1966); also published as The Trap (1969)
- The Star and the Gun (1967)
- Bones of the Buffalo (1967)
- Ambush Creek (1967)
- Cheyenne Drums (1968)
- Death of a Gunfighter (1968)
- Red Sabbath (1968)
- The Youngerman Guns (1969)
- Posse from Poison Creek (1969)
- Apache Hostage (1970)
- A Death in Indian Wells (1970)
- Red Runs the River (1970)
- Six Ways of Dying (1970)
- Showdown at Mesilla (1971)
- Ride the Hot Wind (1971)
- The Hands of Geronimo (1971)
- Guilt of a Killer Town (1971)
- Massacre Ridge (1971)
- Track of the Hunter (1971)
- A Killing in Kiowa (1972)
- The Feud at Chimney Rock (1972)
- Trial of Judas Wiley (1972)
- The Cheyenne Pool (1973)
- The Homesteader (1972)
- The Hide Hunters (1973)
- The Gun of Jesse Hand (1973)
- The Ordeal of Jason Ord (1973)
- The Tired Gun (1973)
- Redskin (1973)
- Two for Vengeance (1974)
- Bounty Man (1974)
- Death Stalks Yellowhorse (1974)
- The Angry Town of Pawnee Bluffs (1974)
- Lynching at Broken Butte (1974)
- The Orphans of Coyote Creek (1975)
- Vow of Vengeance (1975)
- The Gallows at Graneros (1975)
- Ride a Crooked Trail (1976)
- The Lawless Breed (1976)
- Ambush at Soda Creek (1976)
- Man Outgunned (1976)
- Hunt the Man Down (1977)
- Villa's Rifles (1977)
- The Trial at Apache Junction (1977)
- The Killings at Coyote Springs (1977)
- Cheyenne Captives (1978)
- Death Rides a Black Horse (1978)
- The Law in Cottonwood (1978)
- The Trail of the Apache Kid (1979)
- Rifles of Revenge (1979)
- Ride a Tall Horse (1980)
- Redskin Time (1982)
- Tincup in the Storm Country (1996)
- Trail to Vicksburg (1997)
- Death Rides the Denver Stage (1999)
- The Woman at Ox-Yoke (2000)
- Blood on the Grass (2002)

== Collections of shorter fiction ==
- Sharpshod/They Called Him a Killer (1990)
- Ride the Red Trail: A Western Trio (2001)
- Guns of Vengeance: A Western Duo (2003)

== Films ==
- Long Live Your Death (1971) (Based on the 1964 novel The Killer From Yuma)
- The Undefeated (1969) (An unknown uncredited novel according to sources at IMDb.com)
- Death of a Gunfighter (1969) (Based on the 1968 novel of the same name)
- Red Sundown (1956) (Based on the 1956 novel Back Trail)
