= Rattler Kid =

- Spanish: Un hombre vino a matar
- Directed by: León Klimovsky
- Written by: Odoardo Fiory; Brad Harris; Luigi Mondello
- Story by: Eduardo Manzanos
- Produced by: Luigi Mondello
- Cinematography: Julio Ortas
- Edited by: Antonio Gimeno; Gian Maria Messeri
- Music by: Francesco De Masi
- Production companies: Copercines, Cooperativa Cinematográfica; Nike Cinematografica
- Distributed by: Jupiter-Film; Kora-Film; Sánchez Ramade; Unicorn Video
- Release date: 11 September 1967 (Italy)
- Running time: 87 min
- Countries: Italy; Argentina

Rattler Kid (Spanish: Un hombre vino a matar, Italian: L'uomo venuto per uccidere) is a 1967 Italian-Argentine western film directed by León Klimovsky, scored by Francesco De Masi, and starring Richard Wyler, Jesús Puente, Brad Harris, and Aurora del Alba.

== Cast ==
- Richard Wyler as Anthony Garnett / Rattler Kid
- Jesús Puente as Alex Turner
- Brad Harris as Sheriff Bill Manners
- Aurora de Alba as Inés
- Guillermo Spoletini as Riff
- Luis Induni as Vic
- Lucio De Santis as Jeff
- Feny Benussi as Helen
- Conny Caracciolo as Jill Scott
- Miguel s. del Castillo as Sam Scott
- Santiago Rivero as Prosecutor
- Francisco Braña as Tom
- Simón Arriaga as Jim
- José Ma. Caffarel as Martin Anderson
- Ángel Menéndez
- Pedro Fenollar
- Rafael Albaicín as José
- Guillermo Méndez
- José Sepúlveda
- Luis Barboo as Silent Wolf
- Agustín Bescos
