= The Relentless Four =

1965 film

I quattro inesorabili
- Directed by: Primo Zeglio
- Written by: Primo Zeglio
- Screenplay by: Manuel Marcello De Caso; Federico De Urrutia; Marcello Fondato; Primo Zeglio; Manuel Sebares
- Produced by: Adriano Merkel
- Starring: Adam West; Robert Hundar; Red Ross; Ralph Baldwyn; János Barta; José Jaspe
- Cinematography: Miguel Fernández Mila
- Edited by: Daniele Alabiso
- Music by: Marcello Giombini; Franco Pisano
- Distributed by: Produzioni Europee Associati
- Release date: December 3, 1965
- Running time: 91 minutes
- Country: Italy
- Language: Italian

The Relentless Four or I quattro inesorabili is a 1965 Italian Spaghetti Western film in Eastmancolor directed by Primo Zeglio.

== Synopsis ==
A Texas Ranger is framed by the four outlaws he is chasing for a crime he did not commit.

== Cast ==
- Adam West as Ranger Sam Garrett
- Robert Hundar as Alan
- Red Ross as Troy
- Ralph Baldwyn as Moss
- János Barta as Rancher John
- José Jaspe as Implacable
- Roberto Camardiel as Jeffrey Anders
- Dina Loy as Eliza Anders / Susan Terry
- Cris Huerta as Comisario
- Elisa Mainardi as Nancy
- Luis Induni as Sheriff Luke
- Francisco Sanz as Doctor
- Robert Johnson Jr. as Bobi Calhoun
- Pauline Baards as Lucy Anders / Sra. Terry
