= King of Africa (film) =

- Directed by: Sandy Howard
- Written by: Sandy Howard; Jack de Witt
- Produced by: Sandy Howard
- Starring: Ty Hardin
- Production company: Howard Productions
- Release date: 1968
- Countries: Italy; Spain; United States
- Language: English

King of Africa is a 1968 film. It was also known as One Step to Hell.

== Premise ==
A British colonial policeman in Africa, circa 1900, pursues a band of escaped killers.

== Cast ==
- Ty Hardin as Lt. King Edwards
- Pier Angeli as Ann Peterson
- Rossano Brazzi as Dr. Hamilton
- George Sanders as Capt. Walter Phillips
- Simon Sabela
- Helga Liné as Deborah
- Dale Cummings as Zeke the Bartender
- Pamela Tudor

== Production ==
The film was based on an original story by Jack De Witt for producer Sandy Howard. Howard said "we feel we have an African James Bond" in the story. Filming was to begin in April 1967.

By April, Jack Lamont was set to direct, the title was changed to King and filming was pushed back to May.

Shot in South Africa, post-production was done in Madrid.
