= Trap for Seven Spies =

1967 film

- Directed by: Mario Amendola
- Written by: Mario Amendola; Antonio Roman
- Starring: Yvonne Bastien; Eduardo Fajardo
- Cinematography: José F. Aguayo
- Edited by: Luciano Cavalieri
- Music by: Lallo Gori
- Release date: 1 December 1966

Trap for Seven Spies (Italian: Trappola per sette spie, Spanish: Siete espías en la trampa) is a 1966 Italian-Spanish international co-production spy film written and directed by Mario Amendola and starring Yvonne Bastien, Eduardo Fajardo and Carlo Giuffrè. It has been described as a Eurospy variation of The Most Dangerous Game.

== Plot ==
After the end of World War II former SS Colonel Von Rittenau resides in a French castle with a group of New Nazis. Von Rittenau captures seven former Allied secret agents after he discovers their names in an old Gestapo archive and now wants his revenge on them.

== Cast ==
- Yvonne Bastien as Micaela
- Eduardo Fajardo as Colonel Von Rittenau
- Mirko Ellis as Hampstead
- Mila Stanic as Nadia
- Carlo Giuffrè as Castellotti
- Lucio De Santis as Bertrand
- Piero Morgia as Von Rittenau's Nazi
- Bruno Cirino as French policeman
