= The Two Rivals (1960 film) =

AYUSH SHUKLA
- Directed by: Carlos Arévalo; Siro Marcellini
- Written by: Franco Castellano; Gigliola Falluto; Armando Grottini; Giuseppe Moccia; Carlo Musso; Fulvio Pazziloro; Nino Stresa
- Starring: Luciano Tajoli; Rita Giannuzzi; Nunzio Gallo
- Cinematography: Emilio Foriscot; Aldo Scavarda
- Edited by: Tatiana Casini Morigi; Alfonso Santacana
- Music by: Federico Contreras; Carlo Innocenzi
- Production companies: Hispamer Films; Produzione Film
- Distributed by: Aparicio
- Release date: 15 September 1960
- Running time: 87 minutes
- Countries: Italy; Spain
- Language: Spanish

The Two Rivals (Spanish: Los dos rivales, Italian: Meravigliosa) is a 1960 Italian-Spanish film directed by Carlos Arévalo and Siro Marcellini and starring Luciano Tajoli, Rita Giannuzzi and Nunzio Gallo.

== Cast ==
- Luciano Tajoli as Luciano
- Rita Giannuzzi as Rita
- Nunzio Gallo as Sergio
- Carlo Croccolo as Carletto
- Carmen de Lirio as Flora
- Silvia Morgan as Renata
- Pietro De Vico as Merigo
- Tiberio Murgia as Tiberio
- Vicky Lagos
- Anna María Aveta
- Manolo Gómez Bur as Manuel Gómez
- Eduardo Passarelli
- Oreste Lionello
- Nando Angelini
- Mirco Testi as Mirko Testi
- Félix Fernández
- Ángel Álvarez
- Joe Sentieri

== Bibliography ==
- Pascual Cebollada & Luis Rubio Gil. Enciclopedia del cine español: cronología. Ediciones del Serbal, 1996.
