= Terrible Day of the Big Gundown =

1971 film

- Directed by: Sergio Garrone
- Cinematography: Guglielmo Mancori
- Music by: Francesco De Masi
- Release date: 1971
- Language: Italian

Terrible Day of the Big Gundown (Italian: Quel maledetto giorno della resa dei conti, also known as Vendetta at Dawn) is a 1971 Italian Spaghetti Western film directed by Sergio Garrone (here credited as Willy S. Regan).

== Cast ==
- George Eastman: Dr. George Benton
- Ty Hardin: Jonathan Benton
- Bruno Corazzari: Rod Fargas
- Laura Troschel: Lorry Baxter Benson
- Steffen Zacharias: Gregory
- Guido Lollobrigida: Sheriff Jed
- Federico Boido: Peter Fargas
- Dominic Barto: Carl Fargas
- Nello Pazzafini: Convict
