= Arizona Colt =

1966 film by Michele Lupo

- Italian theatrical release poster in 1966.
- The Man from Nowhere
- Directed by: Michele Lupo
- Screenplay by: Ernesto Gastaldi
- Story by: Ernesto Gastaldi; Luciano Martino
- Produced by: Elio Scardamaglia
- Starring: Giuliano Gemma; Corinne Marchand; Fernando Sancho; Roberto Camardiel; Giovanni Pazzafini
- Cinematography: Guglielmo Mancori
- Edited by: Antonietta Zita
- Music by: Francesco De Masi
- Production companies: Leone Film; Orphée Productions
- Distributed by: Interfilm; Nora-Filmverleih; Société Anonyme Universal-Film; Edko Films; G.G. Communications Inc. Golden Era Film Distributors (GEF); Phoenix Film
- Release dates: 27 August 1966 (Italy); 17 February 1971 (France)
- Running time: 118 minutes
- Countries: Italy; France
- Languages: Spanish; Italian; French; English

Arizona Colt (Italian: Il pistolero di Arizona), also known as The Man from Nowhere (Italian: L'uomo venuto dal nulla), is a 1966 technicolor spaghetti Western directed by Michele Lupo and starring Giuliano Gemma, Fernando Sancho, Corinne Marchand.

== Synopsis ==
Looking to add to his gang's numbers, Gordo "Gordon" Wacht (Torrez Gordon Wacht in the Italian version) (Fernando Sancho), raids a jail at the Mexican border. As a sign of loyalty, every member of Wacht's gang is to be branded with the same "S" on their left arms. All who refuse to join his gang are to be shot dead. One of the prisoners, Arizona Colt (Giuliano Gemma) is able to avoid being detected by Wacht's men. It's through escaping from the prison where he meets one of Wacht's men, Whiskey (Roberto Camardiel), a drunkard that was left behind. Arizona agrees to bring the man to the gang leader, and once there, Gordo gives Arizona the same proposition as the rest of his men: join his gang or die. Arizona responds to said offer with his catchphrase, "I'll have to think about it." Unsatisfied with his answer, Gordo attempts to shoot Arizona, but the man proves to be a quicker draw and shoots the gun out of his hand, as well as shooting one of the gang members attempting to ambush him. While riding off on horseback, Kay (Clay in the Italian version) (Giovanni Pazzafini), shoots and wounds Arizona, but it turns out to be a trick, allowing him to evade the gang.

While the Wacht gang make a camp in the desert, Arizona keeps an eye over them, pondering whether or not he'll join their gang. Frustrated, Gordo sends Kay and 5 of his men to kill Arizona, but once again, Arizona tricks them, kills 5 of Gordo's men, and robs Kay of his clothing. On their travels through the desert, Gordo, Kay and the rest of his gang find the 5 dead men, their bodies spelling out the word "NO" - Arizona's response to Gordo's offer. From there, Gordo sends Kay to run reconnaissance on a peaceful little town named Blackstone Hill. On his way there, he runs into Arizona, whom he pleads with not to give away his identity. Once again, Arizona responds with, "I'll think about that.". As the two hang out in the bar, Kay hits on one of the bartender's daughters, a woman named Dolores (Rosalba Neri). However, upon noticing his scar, he's left with no choice but to kill her and ensure her silence. The next morning, Dolores' body is found, and her father, Pete (Pedro in the Italian version), as well her sister, Jane (Corinne Marchand), grieve for her. Determined to catch her sister's killer, Jane is under the impression Arizona might be him, but thankfully, Pete is able to confirm Kay's identity after Gordo and his men rob the town's bank on that very same day.

From there, Arizona offers to turn Kay in, dead or alive, on the condition he is paid $500, and is allowed to marry Jane. Ever the opportunist, Arizona approaches Gordo's hideout, where he attempts to bargain. His proposition is that in exchange for buying Kay off of him, they split the reward money. Interested, Gordo makes the two men fight to the death. Ultimately, Arizona wins, and is double-crossed by Gordo, who not only shoots his arms and legs, but leaves him to die in the desert. It's Whiskey, a member of Wacht's gang, that not only steals Gordo's money, but brings the injured Arizona and Kay's corpse back to Blackstone Hill. Arizona is given a hero's welcome, and while he recovers, he is taken care of by Jane. Pete and the townsfolk, realizing that Arizona might actually marry Jane, and under increasing suspicion about where Whiskey came from, force the two out of town.

Arizona and Whiskey hide out in an abandoned church, where the former practices aiming with his injured hands. Unfortunately, Gordo returns to Blackstone Hill, looking for Whiskey and Arizona. Under the impression that the townsfolk are lying about not knowing their whereabouts, Gordo and his gang rampage the town, and begin killing people. Jane finds Arizona and tries to convince him to come back. Only when Whiskey shows Arizona the money he's been hiding, does Arizona consider returning to Blackstone Hill. This upsets Jane, who leaves in frustration calling him "worse than a leech.". Whiskey says he's going to return to Blackstone Hill, and upon his hands healing, Arizona does too.

Whiskey tries in vain to fight off Gordo and his men with explosives, wiping out some of the gang. Unfortunately, one explodes near him, and he is presumed dead. At this moment, Arizona returns to town, where he confronts Gordo. Using a suit with fake bandaged hands, Arizona is able to trick Gordo into thinking his hands haven't healed yet, allowing him to take out the rest of his men quickly, leaving Gordo to fend for himself. Paranoid and running out of ammunition, Gordo tries to hide in the gravedigger's shop, where Arizona is able to shoot his limbs, keeping him alive so that the citizens of Blackstone Hill may decide his fate. In a twist of events, Whiskey is revealed to be alive, and is being treated, similar to how Arizona was earlier in the film. Arizona is about to leave town, but not before hugging and kissing Jane. She asks him to return one day, to collect his reward, and to stay in Blackstone Hill forever, but once again, Arizona says, "I'll think about that," as he rides off and the credits roll.

== Technicality ==
Filming locations by Almería and Cinecittà about Summer 1965.

=== Production ===
- Art direction and costume design : Walter Patriarca
- Makeup department : Franco Di Girolamo (make-up), Marcella Favella (hair)
- Production management : Paolo Gargano, Piero Lazzari
- Assistant director : Roberto Pariante, Valere Tantini
- Sound department : Italo Cameracanna, Lewis E. Ciannelli, Umberto Picistrelli
- Music department : Raul Lovecchio
- Stunts : Miguel Pedregosa, Nazzareno Zamperla
- Camera and electrical department : Sergio D'Offizi, Giuseppe Lanci, Remo Orienti, Angelo Pennoni, Cesare Saronti
- Additional crew : Franco Rossi, N. W. Russo, Manlio Busoni, Roberto Chevalier, Maria Pia Di Meo, Lauro Gazzolo, Gianni Solaro, Igino Lardani, Pino Locchi, Luigi Pavese, Bruno Persa, Carlo Romano, Rita Savagnone, Sergio Tedesco

=== Soundtrack ===
The Arizona Colt or Il pistolero di Arizona (Francesco De Masi feat Raoul) is an original motion picture soundtrack : "He came out of nowhere, with no one beside him. He rode out of the sunrise all alone. A man out of nowhere, with no one to love him. His one faithful companion was his gun. No one could say, just where he came from. No one could say, where he was going. Was he a man without a heart, a man with a heart made of stone...".

=== Cast ===
- Giuliano Gemma as Arizona Colt
- Fernando Sancho as Torrez Gordon Wacht/Gordo "Gordon" Wacht
- Corinne Marchand as Jane
- Giovanni Pazzafini as Clay/Kay
- Andrea Bosic as Pedro/Pete
- Roberto Camardiel as Whiskey
- Mirko Ellis as Sheriff
- Gérard Lartigau as Jack/John
- Rosalba Neri as Dolores
- Pietro Tordi as the Priest
- José Manuel Martín as Wacht Henchman
- Gianni Solaro as Banker
- Valentino Macchi
- Renato Chiantoni as Undertaker
- Tom Felleghy as Will
- Emma Baron
- Otto Rock as Rancher
- Álvaro de Luna as Wacht Henchman
- Piero Morgia
- José Orjas
- Riccardo Pizzuti as Wacht Henchman
- Guglielmo Spoletini as Wacht Henchman
- Elio Angelucci as a Townsman
- Bruno Ariè as Bandit
- John Bartha as Soldier playing cards
- Jeff Cameron as Rancher
- Omero Capanna as Bandit
- Alberigo Donadeo as Man in saloon
- Pietro Martellanza as Rancher
- Gaetano Scala as Wacht Henchman
- José Terrón as Wacht henchman

== Releases ==
Arizona Colt was released in Italy on 27 August 1966 in Italy and in France on 17 February 1971.

== See also ==
- Arizona Colt Returns
- A Pistol for Ringo
- The Return of Ringo
