= Siro Marcellini =

Italian film director and screenwriter (born 1921)

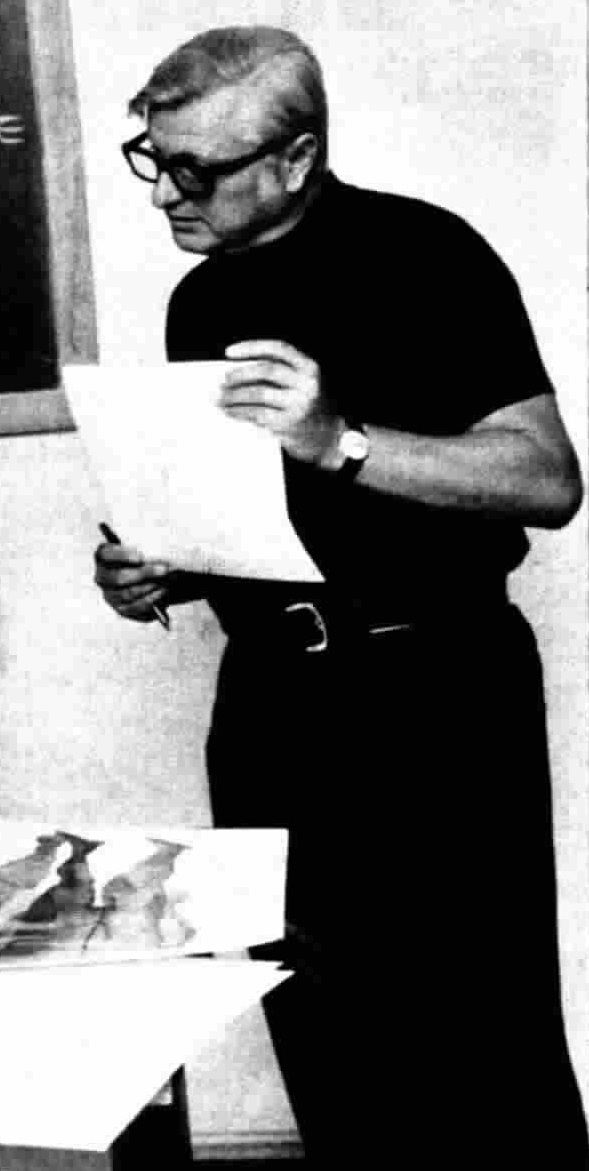
- Born: 16 September 1921; Genzano di Roma, Italy
- Occupation: Director

Siro Marcellini (born 16 September 1921) is an Italian director and screenwriter.

Born in Genzano di Roma, Marcellini started his career as a theater director before moving to films, where he first worked as an assistant director. He directed eleven films between 1953 and 1970, also writing the screenplays for several of them.

== Selected filmography ==
- Devil's Cavaliers (1959)
- The Two Rivals (1960)
- The Secret Mark of D'Artagnan (1962)
- The Beast of Babylon Against the Son of Hercules (1964)
- Man of the Cursed Valley (1964)
- Lola Colt (1967)
- Gangster's Law (1969)
