= Long Live Your Death =

1971 film

- Wild East DVD Cover
- Directed by: Duccio Tessari
- Screenplay by: Dino Maiuri; Massimo De Rita; Juan de Orduña; Günter Ebert
- Based on: The Killer from Yuma by Lewis B. Patten
- Produced by: Mickey Knox
- Starring: Franco Nero; Eli Wallach; Lynn Redgrave; Horst Janson; Eduardo Fajardo; Marilù Tolo
- Cinematography: José F. Aguayo
- Edited by: Enzo Alabiso
- Music by: Gianni Ferrio
- Production companies: Tritone Filmindustria Roma S.r.l.; Terra-Filmkunst GmbH; Producciones Cinematograficas Orduna
- Distributed by: Titanus
- Release date: December 1971 (Italy)
- Running time: 103 minutes
- Countries: Italy; West Germany; Spain

Long Live Your Death (Italian: Viva la muerte... tua!), also known as Don't Turn the Other Cheek!, is a 1971 Zapata Western comedy film directed by Duccio Tessari. The film is primarily a parody of 'political' Spaghetti Westerns (also called Zapata Westerns), such as A Professional Gun and Compañeros.

In the film, a con artist posing as a priest learns the location of a hidden treasure. He needs the assistance of a bandit, who is impersonating a deceased revolutionary. The bandit has a treasure map tattooed on his buttocks.

== Plot ==
In priestly disguise, the con artist Orlowsky learns from a last confession about a village where a treasure is hidden. He seeks out the Mexican bandit Max Lozoya, who knows more about its precise location – (part of) the instructions is tattooed on his ass.

At the same time, the Irish journalist Mary O'Donnell wants to fire up the revolutionary cause and bribes sheriff Randall to have the Mexican revolutionary El Salvador escape prison. Although El Salvador is dead, the sheriff agrees, negotiating a higher price. It turns out that he has a scam going, where he takes money to let prisoners escape and then kills them to get a reward – and the prison warden gets half of the taking. They choose Lozoya for the escaping hero (as he is to be executed anyway). Randall is further elated when he finds the "priest" with Lozoya, because Orlowsky is his cousin, which he blames for his handicap, some affliction of the back so he must wear an iron support under the clothes to be able to walk upright. Orlowsky is locked up for later torture to death.

As it turns out the plans of the sheriff fail. The warden goes in to release Lozoya, and once they are in the corridor, the bandit knocks the warden out and helps Orlowsky to escape. It's no easy feat; Lozoya is out of shape, and when he is boosted over a wall by the rear, he protests. When they run into Mary, Orlowsky presents Lozoya as El Salvador and himself as his military advisor, and a confused Lozoya just goes along with it. Later it turns out that she recognised Lozoya from the beginning, but went along with it, something that gives further credit to Orlowsky's accusation that she is a journalist – "someone that creates an idol and then destroys him" – out to start an uprising just to get a story.

Initially, Lozoya takes advantage of his "El Salvador" identity solely to mobilise assistance in his play against Orlowsky. In a tavern, he frames Orlowsky for a watch theft so he can escape and talk to Mendoza alone and find the other half of the treasure map so he can have the cash for himself, but a fight breaks out, leaving Lozoya cornered in a well. Orlowsky arrives to save him, but not before punishing him by leaving him to struggle to stay on the surface first. Soon, Lozoya is forced to give the information to the treasure by dropping his pants, displaying the instructions to Orlowsky. Orlowsky incapacitates Lozoya by making him drink and proceeds to dig. Randall and the Soldiers find Lozoya's sister Lupita and torture her for information. Miguelito, her son, tells the soldiers where Lozoya is to try and save his mother. Meanwhile, Lozoya has come to and has gotten several men to corner Orlowsky. However, Huerta arrives and ties Orlowsky and Lozoya together, before leaving them guarded. Mary rescues them and they go together to San Tomas. On the way, they find the dead bodies of Lupita and Miguelito. Distraught, Lozoya vows "to kill as many regulares as there are hairs on my sister's head". This trail of vengeance leads to general Huerta and the two partners organise an uprising against his garrison, while Mary is obliged to put her virginity on the line in order to distract the commander (she tells him, "There is more than one way to kill a woman"). However, the attack sends him running away in his underwear before she has had to go all the way.

As Huerta also had taken control of the aforementioned treasure, but Lozoya's gives away the money to medicine, schools and hospitals, because he "can't betray these people". Orlowsky grumbles, "I never leave empty-handed" and proceeds to betray "El Salvador" to Huerta for $30.000. The hero is executed after an exhorting speech – "For those who love freedom no idol is necessary, for those who do not, no idol is sufficient". However this is all a ruse. Lozoya is executed with blank bullets, and Orlowsky sets off explosives that kill the soldiers and Huerta (who was just preparing to execute Orlowsky). Randall and his men ambush Orlowsky but they are killed, with the assistance of the "resurrected" Lozoya. The two scoundrels then share the reward money, and Lozoya expresses relief to be "an honest bandit" again.

When Mary appears to suggest that they carry their revolutionary activities to Guatemala, the two quickly ride off.

== Cast ==
- Franco Nero as Prince Dmitri Vassilovich Orlowsky
- Eli Wallach as Alfonso "Max" Lozoya
- Lynn Redgrave as Mary O'Donnell
- Horst Janson as Yuma Sheriff Randall
- Eduardo Fajardo as General Huerta
- Marilù Tolo as Lupita Lozoya
- Gisela Hahn as Orlowsky's Wife
- Víctor Israel as Manuel Mendoza
- Enrique Espinosa as Manolito
- Dan van Husen as Kelly, Prison Guard
- José Jaspe as The old man
- Furio Meniconi as The Bartender
- Mirko Ellis as Mayor
- Gunda Hiller as The Bride
- José Moreno as Yuma prison warden
- Rudy Gaebell as Mendoza
- Carla Mancini as Telegrapher
- Rafael Albaicín as Mexican Rider
- Angelo Boscariol as Guard
- Tito García as Holdup-Man
- Luigi Antonio Guerra as Holdup Man
- Lorenzo Robledo as Mr. Callofen
- Vicente Roca as Horse Trader
- Carlos Romero Marchent as Mexican Rider

== Releases ==
=== Theatrical ===
For the U.S. theatrical release, the film was edited down to 93 minutes, cutting out nearly 17 minutes of footage. Star Eli Wallach came up with the title Don't Turn the Other Cheek! for the U.S. release as he believed titles with the word "death" in them performed poorly at the US box office.

=== Home media ===
Wild East released a limited edition region 0 NTSC DVD with the American title Don't Turn the Other Cheek! on 5/19/09 preserving the film's original widescreen aspect ratio. The DVD contains the full uncut version containing 17 minutes of extra footage not seen in the U.S. theatrical version. The DVD also contains alternate title sequences.
