= Vengeance of the Vikings =

- Directed by: Mario Caiano
- Screenplay by: Mario Caiano; Arpad DeRiso; Giovanni Scolaro
- Story by: Arpad DeRiso; Giovanni Scolaro
- Starring: Gordon Mitchell; Giuliano Gemma; Eleonora Bianchi; Elisa Montés; Eduardo Fajardo
- Cinematography: Enzo Barboni
- Edited by: Jolanda Benvenuti
- Music by: Carlo Franci
- Production companies: Nike Cinematografica; As Films Producciones; Triglav Film
- Release date: 24 September 1965
- Running time: 95 minutes
- Countries: Italy; Spain; Yugoslavia

Vengeance of the Vikings (Italian: Erik il vichingo, lit. 'Erik the Viking') is a 1965 film directed by Mario Caiano.

== Cast ==
- Gordon Mitchell ... Sven / Byarni
- Giuliano Gemma ... Erik
- Eleonora Bianchi ... Gudrid (as Ely McWhite)
- Elisa Montés ... Wa-ta-wa
- Eduardo Fajardo ... Olaf
- Beni Deus ... Torstein (as Beny Deus)
- Alfio Caltabiano ... Narvik - Viking Warrior / Wingar - Indian Chief
- Lucio De Santis ... Eyolf
- Erno Crisa ... Erloff
- Roberto Ceccacci (as Roby Ceccacci)
- Aldo Pini
- Fortunato Arena ... Thormann
- Fedele Gentile ... Viking Chief
- Franco Morici
- Aldo Bufi Landi ... Angheropoulos
- Al Parker

== Production ==
The scenes showing tropical greenery were filmed in a botanical garden north of Málaga.

== Release ==
Vengeance of the Vikings was released on 24 September 1965.
