= Holy Water Joe =

- Directed by: Mario Gariazzo
- Starring: Lincoln Tate; Ty Hardin
- Cinematography: Franco Villa
- Music by: Marcello Giombini
- Release date: 1971
- Country: Italy
- Languages: Italian; English

Holy Water Joe (Italian: Acquasanta Joe) is a 1971 Italian Spaghetti Western film directed by Mario Gariazzo.

== Plot ==
In the immediate aftermath of the American Civil War (1861-1865), Jeff Donovan's outlaw gang, disguised as soldiers of both the Confederacy and the Union, rob banks, using a cannon concealed in a wagon. A man about town, by the name of Holy Water Joe (called such to differentiate between him and his father, Fire Water Joe), finds himself penniless when all his savings are gone, due to a bank robbery by the Donovan gang. Joe finds an opportunity to recoup some of his losses when he captures a deserter from the gang and sells him to Donovan, that creates double dealing and gunplay.

== Cast ==
- Lincoln Tate as Holy Water Joe
- Ty Hardin as Jeff Donovan
- Richard Harrison as Charlie Bennett
- Giulio Baraghini as Jim (credited as Lee Banner)
- Silvia Monelli as Estella
- Tuccio Musumeci as The Sicilian
- Pietro Ceccarelli as Sergeant Butch
- Dante Maggio as The Banker
- Mario Novelli as Donovan Henchman
