= Devil's Cavaliers =

- Directed by: Siro Marcellini
- Written by: Jean Blondel (dialogue); Carlo Alberto Chiesa (screenplay); Siro Marcellini (screenplay); Siro Marcellini (story); Ugo Moretti (dialogue)
- Produced by: Giulio Fiaschi (executive producer); Argy Robelli (producer); Edoardo Robelli (producer)
- Starring: See below
- Cinematography: Luciano Trasatti
- Edited by: Edmond Lozzi
- Music by: Carmine Rizzo
- Release date: 26 June 1959
- Running time: 92 minutes (US)
- Country: Italy
- Language: Italian

Devil's Cavaliers (Italian: I cavalieri del diavolo) is a 1959 Italian adventure film directed by Siro Marcellini, similar in theme and style to The Three Musketeers. Frank Latimore played the hero, Captain Stiller, and Gianna Maria Canale plays the Baroness Elaine of Faldone.

== Plot summary ==
It's the year 1555: France is upset by religious and political struggles. At the court of Henry II, dominated by his wife, Caterina dei Medici, intrigue reigns. In the southern provinces the Huguenots try to undermine the King's authority by any means, pushing the nobles to escape central power. In the Dauphiné the Duke of Vars tries to draw from the situation to satisfy his ambitious aims: he would like to take over the region and marry Louise of Valency: But the girl hates him and when, after years of absence, Riccardo returns home, back from wars of Spain, she invites him to fight with her against the Duke. Riccardo returned to sell his lands, having decided to move to Paris; but the love for his old childhood companion distracts him from his purpose. To the power of the Duke he opposes his cunning and his courage: four comrades in arms help him in the fight against the tyrant, whom Riccardo eventually kills after a fierce duel.

== Cast ==
- Frank Latimore as Capt. Richard Stiller
- Emma Danieli as Countess Louise Valance
- Gianna Maria Canale as Baroness Elaine of Faldone
- Gabriella Pallotta as Guiselle, Louise's Maid
- Anthony Steffen as Richmond
- Andrea Aureli as Duk of Vas
- Federica Ranchi as Derolia the Bar Maid
- Franco Fantasia as Duneil the Swordsman
- Mirko Ellis as Paul, Stiller Henchman
- José Jaspe as Jermaine, Stiller Henchman
- Oreste Lionello
- Andrea Fantasia
- Carlo Bressan
- Pasquale De Filippo
- Franco Diana
- Fedele Gentile
- Loris Gizzi
- Lea Monaco
- Nino Musco
- Bruno Parisio
- Andrea Scotti
- Nunzio Gallo as Count Henri Valance, Louise's Brother
