= Ragan (film) =

- Directed by: José Briz Méndez; Luciano Lelli
- Written by: José Luis Bayonas
- Produced by: Mirko Purgatori
- Starring: Ty Hardin; Antonella Lualdi
- Cinematography: Antonio Macasoli
- Music by: Giacomo Dell'Orso; Nico Fidenco
- Release date: 1968

Ragan (also known as Devil's Angel) is a 1968 Spanish-Italian Eurospy film directed by José Briz Méndez and starring Ty Hardin and Antonella Lualdi.

== Plot ==
Ragan, a former mercenary now running a struggling one-plane air transport service, is approached by a man named Velludo with a $75,000 job offer. Velludo wants Ragan to fly a mission to free Moreno, the former dictator of a Caribbean island. Initially, Ragan declines the offer. However, after his plane is mysteriously destroyed in a fire and his insurance is suddenly canceled, he reluctantly agrees to the job.

Ragan reasons that Moreno is preferable to Chavez, the island's current dictator. Additionally, the mission provides an opportunity to reconnect with his ex-flame, Janine, who is involved in the planned coup along with her husband. Adding complexity to the situation is Maria, a striking blonde who openly expresses her attraction to Ragan.

Despite heavy losses, Ragan and his team successfully execute a daring commando raid to free Moreno. With the mission accomplished, Ragan looks forward to a romantic future with one of the two women competing for his affection.

== Cast ==
- Ty Hardin as Lee Ragan
- Antonella Lualdi as Janine Kohler
- Gustavo Rojo as Velludo
- Giacomo Rossi Stuart as Kohler (as Jack Stuart)
- Rossella Como as Maria
- Ricardo Palacios as Flower
- José María Caffarel as 'Uncle' Borrell
