= Luca Lionello =

Italian actor (born 1964)

- Born: 9 January 1964 (age 62); Rome, Italy
- Occupation: Actor
- Years active: 1985–present
- Height: 1.77 m (5 ft 10 in)
- Father: Oreste Lionello
- Relatives: Cristiana Lionello (sister)

Luca Lionello (born 9 January 1964) is an Italian actor. He is best known for playing Judas Iscariot in Mel Gibson's The Passion of the Christ.

== Biography ==
Born in Rome to actor and voice dubbing artist Oreste Lionello, he has been an actor since 1986. Since then, Lionello came to international attention in 2004, when he played the role of Judas Iscariot in Mel Gibson's The Passion of the Christ.

He was an atheist until 2004, when he became a Catholic, owing to his experience filming The Passion of the Christ.

He has also played at least two other Apostles: St. Barnabas in Imperium: St. Peter, starring Omar Sharif, and St. Thomas in Abel Ferrara's Mary.
