= Fuzzy the Hero =

1973 film

- Film poster
- Spanish: Uno, dos, tres... dispara otra vez
- Directed by: Tulio Demicheli
- Screenplay by: Nino Stresa; Miguel Iglesias; Enrique Josa
- Story by: Miguel Iglesias; Enrique Josa
- Starring: Anthony Steffen; Eduardo Fajardo; Roberto Camardiel
- Cinematography: Memmo Mancori
- Edited by: Gaby Peñalba
- Music by: Lallo Gori
- Production companies: Mundial Film; Tritone Cinematografica
- Distributed by: Modern
- Release dates: 25 May 1973 (Italy); 19 November 1973 (Spain)
- Running time: 84 min

Fuzzy the Hero (Spanish: Uno, dos, tres... dispara otra vez and Italian: Tequila!) is a 1973 Italian-Spanish western film directed by Tulio Demicheli, and starring Eduardo Fajardo, John Bartha and Roberto Camardiel.

The music was composed by Coriolano Gori.

== Cast ==
- Anthony Steffen as Shoshena
- Eduardo Fajardo as Cogan
- Roberto Camardiel as Fuzzy
- Ágata Lys as Ingrid Cogan
- María Elena Arpón as Beatrice Rush
- Mirko Ellis
- John Bartha as the sheriff
- Juan Amigo
- José Luis Zalde as Rush
- José Luis Chinchilla
- Mario Sanz
- Joaquín Solís
- Giovanni Petti
- Juanita Jiménez
- Agustín Bescos
- Pablo Blanco
- Fabián Conde
- German Grech
- Manuel Guitián
- Julio Milian
- Antonio Orengo
