= Noi siamo due evasi =

1959 film

- Directed by: Giorgio Simonelli
- Written by: Castellano e Pipolo; Dino Verde; Dario Sabatello
- Starring: Ugo Tognazzi; Magali Noël; Raimondo Vianello; Sandra Mondaini; Titina De Filippo; Irène Tunc
- Cinematography: Mario Montuori
- Music by: Carlo Rustichelli
- Release date: 1959
- Country: Italy
- Language: Italian

Noi siamo due evasi is a 1959 Italian crime-comedy film directed by Giorgio Simonelli.

== Cast ==
- Ugo Tognazzi: Bernardo Cesarotti
- Magali Noël: Odette
- Raimondo Vianello: Camillo Gorini
- Sandra Mondaini: Isabella
- Titina De Filippo: Baroness Holz
- Irène Tunc: Silvia
- Maurizio Arena: Francesco Curti
- Mirko Ellis: Philippe
- Fred Buscaglione: Himself
- José Jaspe
- Olimpia Cavalli
- José Calvo
