= Man of the Cursed Valley =

1964 film

- Directed by: Siro Marcellini
- Written by: Eduardo M. Brochero; Eduardo Di Lorenzo
- Story by: Ty Hardin
- Produced by: Paolo Moffa
- Starring: Ty Hardin
- Cinematography: Remo Grisanti; Alfredo Fraile
- Edited by: Sara Ontañón
- Music by: Francesco De Masi; Manuel Parada
- Release date: May 22, 1964
- Language: Italian
- Budget: $100,000

Man of the Cursed Valley (Italian: L'uomo della valle maledetta, Spanish: El hombre del valle maldito, also known as The Man of the Accursed Valley) is a 1964 Italian-Spanish Spaghetti Western film directed by Siro Marcellini and starring Ty Hardin.

== Plot ==
Gwen is married to Torito, an Indian. She escapes from a rape attempt and is found wandering in the wilderness by Johnny. Johnny leaves her with Father Ryan.

== Cast ==
- Ty Hardin as Johnny Walcott
- Irán Eory as Gwen Burnett
- Peter Larry as Torito
- José Nieto as Sam Burnett
- John Bartha as Pater Ryan
- Tito García as Indio
- Rafael Albaicín as Apache
- Joe Kamel as Outlaw
- Phil Posner as Outlaw

== Production ==
The film was shot in Madrid under the title Boudine. Hardin was listed as director and co producer of the film. Hardin was injured shooting a scene in the film.
