= Our Man in Jamaica =

- Original film poster
- Directed by: Mel Welles
- Written by: Karl Heinz Vogelmann, Antonio del Amo
- Produced by: Antonio del Amo, Ernst R. von Theumer
- Starring: Larry Pennell; Brad Harris
- Cinematography: Juan Mariné, Aldo Ricci
- Edited by: Daniele Alabiso and María Luisa Soriano
- Music by: Marcello Giombini
- Release date: 4 September 1965
- Running time: 88 minutes
- Country: Italy
- Language: Italian

Our Man in Jamaica/Operation Jamaica (Italian: A 001, operazione Giamaica) is a 1965 Italian Spanish German international co-production Eurospy adventure film directed by an uncredited Mel Welles. It was credited to Ernst R. von Theumer for reasons of European funding.

== Plot ==
Agent 001 Ken Stewart is sent to Jamaica to locate the missing Agent 009 who vanished investigating an arms smuggling operation. After two of Stewart's friends are found dead of electrocution, 001's investigation leads him to an expatriate American criminal who was sentenced to the electric chair but escaped from prison. Seeking revenge, he assembles an army of terrorists based on an island seven miles from Jamaica called Dominica. His arms smuggling is the beginning of a scheme to attack the United States with the aid of Red China and Cuba. The film was made during the April Revolution and Foreign Intervention in the Dominican Republic.

== Cast ==
- Larry Pennell ... Agent 001 Ken Stewart (credited as Alessandro Pennelli)
- Margitta Scherr ... Jane Peacock
- Wolfgang Kieling... Elmer Hayes/Nick
- Brad Harris ... Captain Mike Jefferson
- Barbara Valentin ... Gloria
- Linda Sini ... Signora Cervantes
- John Bartha ... Ship's captain
- Ralph Baldwin ... Gil
- Nando Angelini ... Bar thug
- Rolf Lüder ... Agent 009 Larry Peacock
- Robert Camardiel ... Bar owner
- Christine Schuberth ... Duped girlfriend
- Donald Anderson ... Jamaican Gun Runner #1

== Soundtrack ==
Music by Marcello Giombini

- Un Uomo Come Te

Performed by Maria Cristina Landi

- Io Lo

Performed by Maria Cristina Landi

== Bibliography ==
- Blake, Matt; Deal, David (2004). The Eurospy Guide. Baltimore: Luminary Press. ISBN 1-887664-52-1.
