= Wall of Noise =

1963 American drama film directed by Richard Wilson

- Theatrical release poster
- Directed by: Richard Wilson
- Screenplay by: Joseph Landon
- Based on: Wall of Noise; 1960 novel by Daniel Michael Stein
- Produced by: Joseph Landon
- Starring: Suzanne Pleshette; Ty Hardin; Dorothy Provine; Ralph Meeker; Simon Oakland; Jimmy Murphy
- Cinematography: Lucien Ballard
- Edited by: William H. Ziegler
- Music by: William Lava
- Production company: Warner Bros. Pictures
- Distributed by: Warner Bros. Pictures
- Release date: September 4, 1963
- Running time: 112 minutes
- Country: United States
- Language: English

Wall of Noise is a 1963 American drama film directed by Richard Wilson, written by Joseph Landon, and starring Suzanne Pleshette, Ty Hardin, Dorothy Provine, Ralph Meeker, Simon Oakland and Jimmy Murphy. It was released by Warner Bros. Pictures on September 4, 1963.

== Plot ==
A horse trainer, Joel Tarrant, needs a job and is hired by Matt Rubio, a wealthy building contractor. Joel has a girlfriend, Ann, but is tempted by the advances of Rubio's seductive wife, Laura.

Laura knows there is a horse Joel feels can become a champion and persuades him to buy it. He borrows money from Johnny Papadakis to do so, but the horse is injured and Rubio fires him after recognizing the relationship between his wife and Joel, who is unable to repay Papadakis his debt.

Ann goes to great lengths to help him out of trouble, even offering herself to Papadakis as a form of payment. But after Papadakis dies unexpectedly, Joel and Ann return to their lives, looking after their recovering horse.

== Cast ==
- Suzanne Pleshette as Laura Rubio
- Ty Hardin as Joel Tarrant
- Dorothy Provine as Ann Conroy
- Ralph Meeker as Matt Rubio
- Simon Oakland as Johnny Papadakis
- Jimmy Murphy as Bud Kelsey
- Murray Matheson as Jack Matlock
- Robert F. Simon as Dave McRaab
- George O. Petrie as Mr. Tom Harrington
- Jean Byron as Mrs. Muriel Harrington
- Fred Carson as Adam Kasper
- William "Bill" Walker as "Money"
- Napoleon Whiting as Preacher
- Kitty White as Singer
- Roy Engel as Vet

== Production ==
The film was based on a novel published in 1960. Film rights were bought by Warner Bros.

Filming started 3 December 1962. There was location filming at Hollywood Park Racetrack in Inglewood.

== Reception ==
Variety called it "a professionally constructed but almost opressively sombre film."

Filmink argued the movie "wasn’t bad, nor was Hardin’s performance, and there’s terrific racetrack flavour, but the movie (shot in black and white) felt like a 1950s programmer; it was out of time."

== See also ==
- List of American films of 1963
