= Mirko Ellis =

Swiss-Italian actor

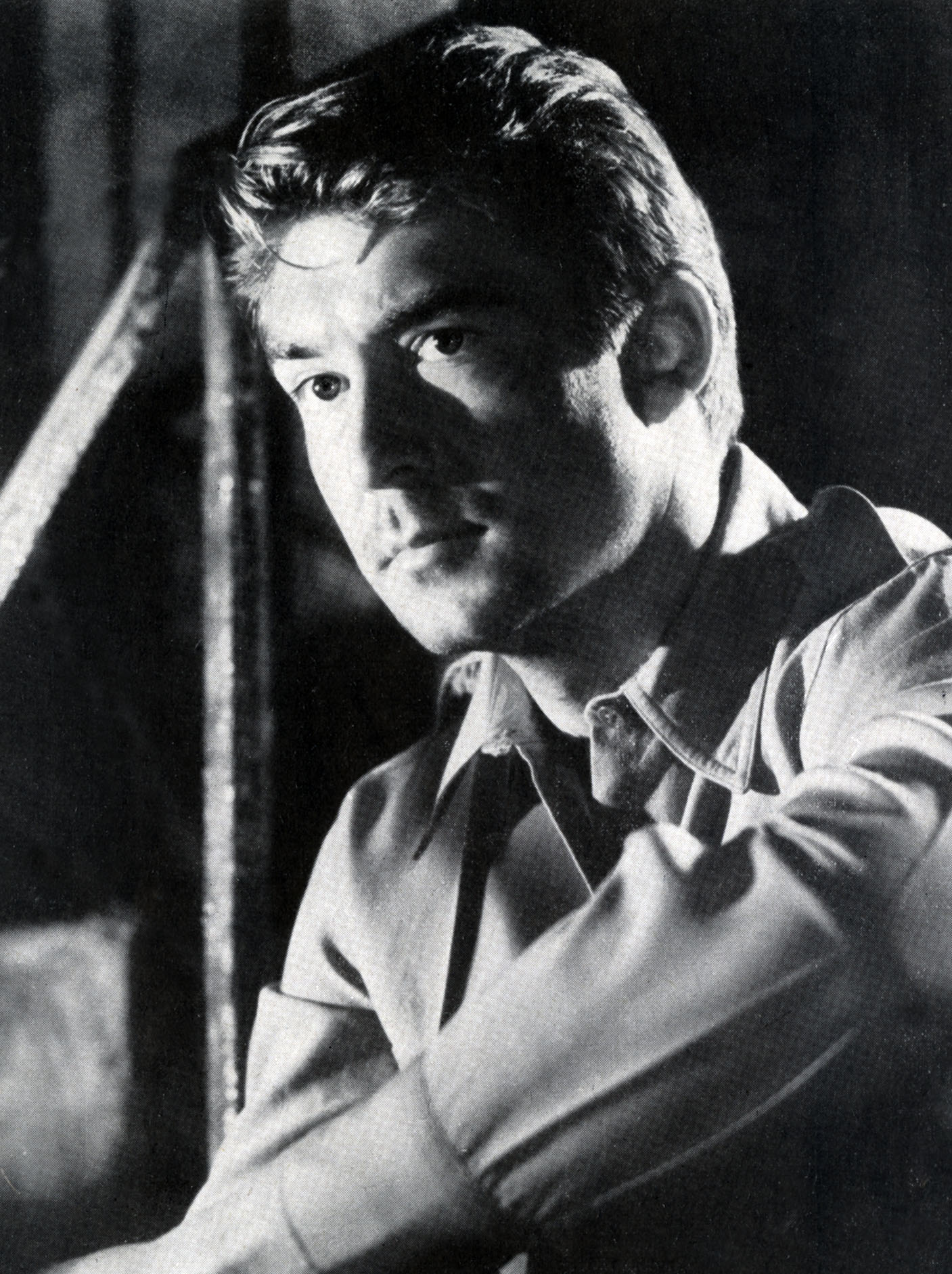
- Ellis in Cineguida magazine, 1953
- Born: 4 September 1923; Locarno
- Died: 11 September 2014 (aged 91); Alghero
- Occupation: actor
- Years active: 1946-1981

Mirko Ellis (4 September 1923 – 11 September 2014) was a Swiss-Italian film, stage and television actor.

Born Mirko Korcinsky in Locarno to a family of Lithuanian origin, Ellis moved, after his studies, to Italy, where he made his film debut in 1946, in a critically acclaimed role in Aldo Vergano's neorealist drama The Sun Still Rises. One year later, he debuted on stage in the theatrical company of Maria Melato. He later alternated important roles and character roles, in genre films and television productions. Ellis was married to fellow actress Esther Maring, with whom he lived in Alghero, Sardinia.

On 11 September 2014, Ellis fell from the balcony of his fourth-floor apartment and died. Police believe his death was a suicide.

== Selected filmography ==
- The Sun Still Rises (1946)
- Vanity (1947)
- Accidenti alla guerra!... (1948) - Von Papen
- Flying Squadron (1949) - Mario
- La roccia incantata (1949)
- Altura (1949)
- La vendetta di una pazza (1951)
- Stormbound (1951) - Stefano
- Trieste mia! (1951) - Karl
- Melody of Love (1952) - Commissario Costa
- Rimorso (1952)
- Deceit (1952)
- Past Lovers (1953)
- Daughters of Destiny (1954) - Anthony (segment "Elisabeth")
- La città canora (1954) - Renato Scala
- Modern Virgin (1954) - Giacomo
- Acque amare (1954) - Policeman
- The Red and the Black (1954) - Norbert de La Mole
- The Two Orphans (1954) - Jacques Frochard
- Tripoli, Beautiful Land of Love (1954) - Renato
- Elena and Her Men (1956) - Marbeau
- Donne, amore e matrimoni (1956) - Andrea
- Ciao, pais... (1956) - Toni
- Fantasmi e ladri (1959)
- Devil's Cavaliers (1959)
- Noi siamo due evasi (1959) - Philippe
- Hannibal (1959) - Mago
- Avventura in città (1959)
- White Slave Ship (1961) - Lord Graveston
- I lancieri neri (1962) - Un Membro del Consiglio
- Gladiator of Rome (1962) - Frasto
- Taras Bulba, the Cossack (1962)
- La notte dell'innominato (1962) - Governatore
- Goliath and the Rebel Slave (1963) - Politician with Marcius
- The Lion of St. Mark (1963) - Civetta
- The Ten Gladiators (1963) - Servius Galba
- Son of the Circus (1963) - Marcos
- Hercules Against the Barbarians (1964) - King Vladimir
- Old Shatterhand (1964) - Joe Burker
- The Two Gladiators (1964) - Pertinace
- Revolt of the Praetorians (1964) - Seiano
- 100 Horsemen (1964) - One-Eyed Nobleman (uncredited)
- Revenge of The Gladiators (1964) - Vilfredo, Genserico's Son
- Buffalo Bill, Hero of the Far West (1964) - Chief Yellow Hand
- Agent 077: Mission Bloody Mary (1965)
- Gideon and Samson: Great Leaders of the Bible (1965) - (uncredited)
- I tre del Colorado (1965) - Capitan Robert Doyle
- How We Robbed the Bank of Italy (1966) - Mirko
- For One Thousand Dollars Per Day (1966) - Wayne Clark
- Missione sabbie roventi (1966)
- Web of Violence (1966)
- Arizona Colt (1966) - Sheriff
- El Rojo (1966) (1966) - Navarro
- Trap for Seven Spies (1967) - Hampstead
- Killer Caliber .32 (1967) - Sheriff Bear
- Top Secret (1967) - Hardy
- Tom Dollar (1967)
- The Last Killer (1967) - Stevens
- Hate for Hate (1967) - Moxon
- Dakota Joe (1967) - Paulo
- The Fuller Report (1968) - Jimmy
- Persecución hasta Valencia (1968)
- ...dai nemici mi guardo io! (1968) - El Condor
- Emma Hamilton (1968) - Le commandant-en-chef John Payne
- Hora cero: Operación Rommel (1969) - Lt.Robert Mills
- Battle of the Commandos (1969) - Capt. Adler
- The Conspiracy of Torture (1969) - 3rd Excellency
- Long Live Your Death (1971) - Mayor
- Tequila! (1973)
- Kid il monello del west (1973)
- The Biggest Battle (1978) - German Officer in Bar
- Il medium (1980)
