= Drummer of Vengeance =

1971 film

- Directed by: Mario Gariazzo
- Written by: Franco Daniele; Mario Gariazzo; Nello Rossati
- Produced by: Robert Paget
- Starring: Ty Hardin; Rossano Brazzi
- Cinematography: Alvaro Lanzoni
- Music by: Claudio Tallino
- Release date: 1971
- Language: English

Drummer of Vengeance (Italian: Il giorno del giudizio, also known as Day of Judgment, Doomsday and An Eye for an Eye) is a 1971 Italian Spaghetti Western film written and directed by Mario Gariazzo and starring Ty Hardin, Rossano Brazzi and Craig Hill.

== Plot ==
On his return a war veteran finds his farmhouse burned to the ground. His young Native American wife and his little son have died in the flames. Responsible are a bunch of men who killed this man's family out of rage about his stance in the war. Using a false identity he goes to the close-by town where the murderers are to be found. He finds and confronts them one by one. Each time he uses his dead son's wind-up toy to remind them on their crime while he challenges them to a duel which none of them survives.

== Cast ==
- Ty Hardin as The Stranger
- Rossano Brazzi as The Sheriff
- Craig Hill as O'Connor
- Gordon Mitchell as Deputy Norton
- Edda Di Benedetto as Prairie Fowler
- Rosalba Neri as Rising Sun
- Guido Lollobrigida as Clay
- Pinuccio Ardia as Mr. Higgins
- Raf Baldassarre as Jason
- Stelio Candelli as Deputy Miller
- Umberto Raho as The Mayor
- Ken Wood as Blackie
- Bruno Corazzari as Bill
- Federico Boido
