= Murguía =

Murguía is the Spanish version of a Basque place-name and a surname.

== People ==
Notable people with the surname include:

- Alejandro Murguía (born 1949), American poet, short story writer, and editor
- Alfredo Murguía (born 1969, Mexican football manager and player
- Ana Ofelia Murguía (1933–2023), Mexican actress
- Carlos Murguia (born 1957), American judge
- Guadalupe Murguía Gutiérrez (born 1955), Mexican lawyer and politician
- Janet Murguía (born 1960), American civil rights activist
- Luis Alfredo Murguía (born 1956), Mexican politician
- Manuel Murguía (1833–1923), Galician journalist and historian
- Margarita Chávez Murguía (born 1959), Mexican architect and politician
- Mary H. Murguia (born 1960), American judge
- Rafael Murguía (born 1986), Mexican football player
- Verónica Murguía (born 1960), Mexican fantasy writer

== Place ==
- The Spanish version of the name of the village of Murgia, in the province of Álava, Basque Country, Spain.
