= The White, the Yellow, and the Black =

1975 film directed by Sergio Corbucci

- Spanish film poster
- Directed by: Sergio Corbucci
- Screenplay by: Amendola & Corbucci; Santiago Moncada; Renée Asseo
- Story by: Antonio Troisio; Marcello Coscia; Sergio Spina
- Produced by: Norberto Soliño
- Starring: Giuliano Gemma; Tomas Milian; Eli Wallach
- Cinematography: Luis Cuadrado
- Edited by: Eugenio Alabiso
- Music by: Guido & Maurizio De Angelis
- Production companies: Tritone Cinematografica; Filmel; Mundial Film
- Distributed by: Consorzio Italiano Distributori Indipendenti Film (CIDIF)
- Release date: 17 January 1975
- Running time: 112 minutes
- Countries: Italy; France; Spain
- Language: Italian

The White, the Yellow, and the Black (Italian: Il bianco, il giallo, il nero), also known as Samurai and Shoot First... Ask Questions Later, is a 1975 Spaghetti Western comedy film.

It is the last spaghetti western directed by Sergio Corbucci. Differently from his previous western films, this is openly parodic, acting as a spoof of Red Sun. It was generally poorly received by critics. Milian reprised his role, with slight changes, in the comedy film Crime at the Chinese Restaurant.

== Plot ==
A horse from Japan which was supposed to be a present for the government of the United States has been stolen. A motley crew consisting of Sheriff Gideon ('The Black'), famous outlaw Blanc de Blanc ('The White') and inept servant Sakura ('The Yellow') tries to retrieve the precious animal. During their investigation they are confronted by a violent bunch of former soldiers of the Confederate States of America who now live as desperados.

== Cast ==
- Giuliano Gemma as Blanc de Blanc "Swiss"
- Tomas Milian as Sakura
- Eli Wallach as Sheriff Edward "Blackjack" Gideon
- Manuel de Blas as Major Donovan
- Jacques Berthier as Kelly Butler
- Romano Puppo as Kady
- Nazareno Zamperla as Sgt. Donovan
- Cris Huerta as Robinson Grasso
- Gary Wilson as The Sheriff
