= Jesse James' Kid =

1965 film

- Directed by: Antonio del Amo
- Written by: Marcello Fondato; Pino Passalacqua (screenplay)
- Music by: Angelo Francesco Lavagnino
- Release date: 23 April 1965
- Running time: 91 minutes
- Countries: Italy; Spain
- Language: Italian

Jesse James' Kid (Italian: Solo contro tutti, Spanish: El hijo de Jesse James, also known as Son of Jesse James) is a 1965 Spanish-Italian Spaghetti Western film directed by Antonio del Amo.

== Cast ==
- Robert Hundar as Bill James
- Mercedes Alonso as Dorothy
- Adrian Hoven as Allan
- Luis Induni
- Roberto Camardiel
- José Canalejas as Joe Kamel
- Pier A. Caminnecci
- José Jaspe
- Raf Baldassarre as Bruce
- Tomás Torres
- John Bartha
- Fernando Sánchez Polack
- Adolfo Torrado
- Robert Johnson Jr.
