= Roberto Camardiel =

Spanish theatre director and actor (1917–1989)

- Born: Saturnino Roberto Camardiel Escudero; 29 November 1917; Alagón, Zaragoza, Spain
- Died: 15 June 1989 (aged 71); Zaragoza, Spain
- Occupation: Actor
- Years active: 1938–1985

Roberto Camardiel Escudero (29 November 1917 – 15 June 1989) was a Spanish theatre director and actor.

He appeared in Culpables and Bajo el cielo andaluz (1960), both directed by Arturo Ruiz-Castillo and starring Marifé de Triana. In 1964 he got the Premio Nacional a la Mejor Interpretación Principal Masculina for his roles in Isidro Labrador, directed by Rafael J. Salvia, and Piedra de toque, directed by Julio Buchs, delivered by the minister D. José Solís Ruiz. He appeared in El Cristo del Océano (1971), directed by Tito Fernández, based on a book by Anatole France and starring Nino del Arco, Paolo Gozlino, José Suárez, Pilar Velázquez, Leonard Mann, Elio Marconato, José Manuel Martín, Ana Farra, Juan A. Elices, Goyo Lebrero, María Elena Arpón and Perla Cristal.

He died on 15 June 1989 from a bone disease at the age of 71. In October 2008 a park near Urbanización Kasan was named after him by the Consejo de Gobierno de Zaragoza.

== Selected filmography ==
- Persecución en Madrid (1952) – José Guillén
- Todos somos necesarios (1956)
- El hombre que viajaba despacito (1957) – Luciano
- Los ángeles del volante (1957) – Policía
- Mensajeros de Paz (1957) – Conserje del hotel
- Un indiano en Moratilla (1958)
- Aquellos tiempos del cuplé (1958) – Politico de la oposición
- Una muchachita de Valladolid (1958) – Director Centro Gallego
- The Nightingale in the Mountains (1958) – Peppino
- A Luz Vem do Alto (1959) – Bernardo
- Llegaron dos hombres (1959)
- Molokai, la isla maldita (1959) – Bluck
- La encrucijada (1960) – Max
- Un ángel tuvo la culpa (1960) – Esustaquio Viñas
- Nada menos que un arkángel (1960)
- Culpables (1960) – Antonio
- Bajo el cielo andaluz (1960) – Rafael Montoro
- El hombre de la isla (1960)
- La contessa azzurra (1960) – L'avvocato Gigliozzi
- Ahí va otro recluta (1960) – Sargento
- My Street (1960) – Marcelino
- Ursus (1961) – Cleonte
- La estatua (1961)
- Aquí están las vicetiples (1961) – Txomin
- The Colossus of Rhodes (1961) – Serse
- La vida privada de Fulano de Tal (1961)
- Pachín (1961)
- Bello recuerdo (1961) – Ramon
- Pachín almirante (1961)
- Salto mortal (1962) – Leoncio
- El hombre del expreso de Oriente (1962)
- El último verano (1962) – Gordo (uncredited)
- Teresa de Jesús (1962) – Blas, el Recuero
- Tómbola (1962) – Batacazo, El Gordo
- The Son of Captain Blood (1962) – Oliver Orguelthorpe
- Bahía de Palma (1962)
- Siempre en mi recuerdo (1962)
- Jaguar (1963) – Juano
- Perseo l'invincibile (1963) – Cefeo
- Rocío from La Mancha (1963) – Rafael
- Ensayo general para la muerte (1963) – Comisario Serge Dupont
- Bochorno (1963) – Don Leandro
- Piedra de toque (1963)
- Juego de hombres (1963)
- Isidro el labrador (1964) – Iván de Vargas
- Aquella joven de blanco (1964) – Commissaire Jacomet
- Coplan, agent secret FX 18 (1964) – Mazekia
- Backfire (1964) – Stefanidès
- Rueda de sospechosos (1964) – Inspector Paco Jiménez
- El señor de La Salle (1964) – Nyel
- Murieta (1965) – García 'Jack Tres Dedos'
- The Vampire of Düsseldorf (1965) – Le régiseur de 'L'Eldorado' (uncredited)
- Jesse James' Kid (1965) – Alonso
- Whisky y vodka (1965) – Grisha Grisovich
- Our Man in Jamaica (1965)
- The Relentless Four (1965) – Jeffrey Anders
- For a Few Dollars More (1965) – Tucumcari station clerk
- Adiós gringo (1965) – Dr. Verne Barfield
- The Two Parachutists (1965) – Gen. Jose Limar
- La escalada de la muerte (1965) – El Mendigo
- Platero y yo (1966) – Narbón
- 100.000 dollari per Lassiter (1966) – Pedro
- ¡Es mi hombre! (1966) – Don Tarsio
- That Man George (1966)
- Las últimas horas... (1966)
- Missione sabbie roventi (1966)
- Arizona Colt (1966) – Whiskey
- La resa dei conti (1966) – Sheriff Jellicol
- Up the MacGregors! (1967) – Pa Donovan
- Adios, Hombre (1967) – Doc
- Django Kill... If You Live, Shoot! (1967) – Sorrow
- Left Handed Johnny West (1967) – Dusty
- Les Têtes brûlées (1967) – Salvador
- Escuela de enfermeras (1968) – (uncredited)
- Train for Durango (1968) – Lobo
- Between God, the Devil and a Winchester (1968) – Uncle Pink
- The Sailor with Golden Fists (1968) – Tito Porro
- Gatling Gun (1968) – Dr. Alan Curtis
- El taxi de los conflictos (1969) – El tio de Catalina
- Prisionero en la ciudad (1969) – Ambrosio
- Quinto: non ammazzare (1969) – William, Tavern owner
- Hamelín (1969) – Burgomaestre
- Cuatro noches de boda (1969) – Don Laureano
- El ángel (1969) – Inspector de policía
- Susana (1969) – Emilio
- Il trapianto (1970) – Don Liborio – il prete
- La sfida dei MacKenna (1970) – Don Diego
- Arizona Colt Returns (1970) – Double Whiskey
- Mr. Superinvisible (1970) – Beithel
- They Call Me Hallelujah (1971) – Gen. Emiliano Ramirez
- El Cristo del Océano (1971) – Don José
- Simón, contamos contigo (1971) – Don Teófilo
- Me debes un muerto (1971) – Don Bernardo
- Ben and Charlie (1972) – Sheriff of Silvertown (uncredited)
- It Can Be Done Amigo (1972) – L'udriaco
- La garbanza negra, que en paz descanse... (1972) – Monsieur Dupont
- The Arizona Kid (1972) – Duffy
- Return of Halleluja (1972) – Gen. Manuel Ramirez
- Trop jolies pour être honnêtes (1972)
- La venganza del Doctor Mabuse (1972) – Sultan
- El caserío (1972) – Manu
- Uno, dos, tres... dispara otra vez (1973) – Fuzzy
- Me has hecho perder el juicio (1973) – Moisés
- Vacaciones sangrientas (1974)
- Cuando el cuerno suena (1975)
- The Possessed (1975) – Managing Editor
- Bienvenido, Mister Krif (1975)
- El extraño amor de los vampiros (1975) – Marcus
- Solo ante el Streaking (1975) – Somontes
- Sábado, chica, motel ¡qué lío aquel! (1976) – Pedro
- Las delicias de los verdes años (1976) – D. Protasio
- Mauricio, mon amour (1976) – Doctor Pereda
- Guerreras verdes (1976) – Cabo Mariano
- El calor de la llama (1976) – Pedro
- Marcada por los hombres (1977) – Anselmo
- Impossible Love (1977) – Sargento
- Doña Perfecta (1977) – Tío Licurgo
- Un hombre llamado Flor de Otoño (1978) – Armengol
- Cabo de vara (1978)
- La ciudad maldita (1978) – Sheriff Noonan
- Venus de fuego (1978) – Cifuentes
- La ocasión (1978) – Campesino
- Tres mujeres de hoy (1980) – Padre de Maribel
- Sus años dorados (1980) – El viejo
- El lobo negro (1981)
- Habibi, amor mío (1981)
- La leyenda del tambor (1981) – Mosén Ramón
- Cristóbal Colón, de oficio... descubridor (1982) – Califa
- Nacional III (1982) – Tío Román
- Juana la Loca... de vez en cuando (1983)
- El Cid cabreador (1983) – Conde de Oviedo (final film role)
