= List of James Bond parodies and spin-offs =

The James Bond series of novels and films has been parodied and referenced many times in a number of different media, including books, comics, films, television shows, and video games. Most notable of all these parodies is the spoof Casino Royale in 1967, which was produced using the actual film rights purchased from writer Ian Fleming over a decade prior to its release. Unlike an imitation, a parody is often protected from legal affairs by the people whose property is being parodied.

== Premise ==
James Bond parodies generally contain several elements, adopted from the James Bond novels and films, which are featured in these parody works. These usually include the following:

- The protagonist(s) is a near invincible secret service agent, who works for a secret government national or international intelligence agency. In some parodies, the hero is recast as a bumbling idiot, who achieves the given objectives through sheer luck or as a fluke and pre-planning.
- The protagonist is in frequent contact with beautiful, provocative and often scantily clad women during the course of his assignment. Some of these women are dangerous spies working for the other side. Villains accomplices and some women's costumes, whether they are in league with the seen or hidden villain, are evocative and trendy.
- In the original Bond books and films, the chief adversary is usually an evil genius, who heads an international criminal syndicate, which seeks to destroy the current world order, in order to achieve global domination. In the parody, the villain can be a bumbling, over-important, arrogant fool himself.
- Much is made of the use of innovative gadgetry, which the protagonist uses to his advantage.
- The main villain is sometimes completely unseen behind a chair with a menacing voice, smoking, drinking or stroking a cat.
- Humour is an important component of this genre. Flirtatious and suave tact and flair takes first place.
- There can be jokes about how stupid or expendable the random anonymous henchman are.

There are also various subgenres, within this style. Some of the most notable variants include: a female protagonist(s) (in place of the male), child protagonists, a strong science fiction element (known as spy-fi) and the erotic (adult) spy novel, comic, or film. The term Eurospy refers to the large number of films within this genre that were produced in Europe. Although many of the James Bond parodies were produced in the United States or Europe, the genre is very much an international one, with novels, comics and films being produced across the globe.

== Advertising campaigns ==
- From 1999 to 2006, Guinness promoted its products in Africa using the advertising character, Michael Power (played by Cleveland Mitchell), as the cornerstone of a major marketing campaign. Jo Foster of the BBC referred to Power as "Africa's very own 'James Bond'". The character was portrayed as having been born in Jamaica and raised in Great Britain. By 2003, it became one of the best-known alcohol advertising campaigns in Africa.
- In 2002, Guinness applied the Michael Power formula to Asia with the character Adam King.
- In 2012, model Shirley Mallmann appeared in a tribute to the James Bond franchise in celebration of its 50th anniversary for the Brazilian ELLE magazine. She starred in a video directed by Manuel Nogueira titled "Bond Girl Reloaded", where she dons looks from Alexandre Herchcovitch and Balmain, while battling armed villains, ending in a fiery explosion.
- In 2021, MI6 released the image of its annual Christmas Card, which that year featured Father Christmas posing with a candy cane against a backdrop reminiscent of the Bond movies' opening credits.

== Comics ==
- The Dutch comic series Agent 327 by Martin Lodewijk started out as a parody of James Bond, but later evolved more into its own thing, though still maintaining elements from the franchise.
- Anacleto, agente secreto, Spanish comic by Manuel Vázquez Gallego has often been cited as a James Bond parody, but Gallego claimed that his initial inspiration was the TV series Get Smart.
- Asterix and the Black Gold is largely a parody of James Bond, with a Roman secret spy named Dubbelosix who is a caricature of Sean Connery.
- The League of Extraordinary Gentlemen: The Black Dossier features a ruthless and sadistic British spy named Jimmy Bond, descended from the League's 19th-century go-between Campion Bond. He reappears in The League of Extraordinary Gentlemen: Century as Sir James, a respected figure in the intelligence community being maliciously kept alive by a vengeful M despite suffering from syphilis, emphysema, and cirrhosis.
- 007 -The James Bomb Musical, a Mad Magazine musical based on the James Bond films, where the mysterious head of the evil organisation trying to kill 007 is revealed to be Mike Hammer. The plot was written by Frank Jacobs and drawn by Mort Drucker. It appeared in issue #94 (April 1965).
  - In issue #165 (March 1974) of Mad Magazine spoofed eight James Bond movies, again drawn by Mort Drucker, but written by Arnie Kogen.
  - In issue #340 (October 1995) of Mad, Mike Snider and Angelo Torres spoofed James Bond by turning it in a politically correct updated version for the 1990s.
- The comic book series Planetary has a secret agent character named John Stone who closely resembles Bond, but has some similarities to Nick Fury
- One issue of the Sonic the Hedgehog Archie comics featured several references to James Bond in a story entitled "The Man from H.E.D.G.E.H.O.G." Among these were: a screen that depicted several of Dr. Robotnik's failed operations, all of which had been thwarted by Sonic the Hedgehog, all named after James Bond movie titles: Moonraker, Dr. No, Thunderball, and Goldfinger; the head of a secret intelligence group known by the alias "Who"; a crate labeled "For Your Eyes Only"; and Sonic making use of one of James Bond's humorous quips "Shocking ... positively shocking".
- Agent 008½ in the Moomin comic strip, episode 48, 1966.
- In the manga and anime Spy × Family, an animated cartoon series exists in its universe called Spy Wars which features the main character Bondman, the Forgers' family pet dog Bond is also named after the character.
- 0.0. Duck and Mata Harrier are a secret-agent duo from the Donald Duck universe featuring in several Disney comics.

== Films ==
=== Unofficial parodies ===
==== Matt Helm ====
First published in 1960, Matt Helm is a fictional character created by author Donald Hamilton. The character is not meant to be a spoof of James Bond, rather having attributes of an homage, but not in the strict sense. Film versions of Matt Helm, as played by Dean Martin, were meant to spoof the 007 movies as well as the character James Bond. The four movies made took their titles from Hamilton's novels, though the movies had little in common with the books of the same name. The Silencers and Murderers' Row were released in 1966. The Ambushers in 1967 and The Wrecking Crew in 1968.

==== Austin Powers ====
Austin Powers is a film series created by Canadian comedian Mike Myers. Many of the characters throughout the franchise are parodies of Bond characters, including Myers' character of the same name. Myers has said that Sean Connery was the inspiration for his character, especially Powers' thick chest hair. In addition, the names of the films are also parodies of Bond novels and films.

Films

- International Man of Mystery (1997)
- The Spy Who Shagged Me (1999) is a parody of The Spy Who Loved Me.
- Goldmember (2002) is a parody of Goldfinger. The title of the film led to legal action being taken by MGM, the distributors of the James Bond film franchise, that briefly led to the film's title being removed from promotional material and trailers. During the period when the film had no official title, it was unofficially being called Never Say Member Again, a reference to the non-canon Bond film Never Say Never Again. The dispute was quickly resolved and the original film title remained. Although MGM most likely would have lost a court case against the makers of Goldmember (see: Copyright information on parodies), MGM did secure a spot for the trailer to 2002's Bond film Die Another Day in settlement.

Characters

- Ernst Stavro Blofeld, the head of SPECTRE and Bond's archenemy, is parodied in all three Austin Powers films as Dr. Evil (Mike Myers). Like Blofeld in You Only Live Twice, Dr. Evil has a facial scar over his eye and wears either a white or a grey Nehru jacket which is also worn by the first Bond villain, Dr. Julius No (Joseph Wiseman). Both characters also possess white Persian cats. Dr. Evil's cat Mr. Bigglesworth, however, loses its hair due to a side-effect of the cryogenic freezing process which preserved Dr. Evil for 30 years. Dr. Evil is a parody of Donald Pleasence's Blofeld.
- Basil Exposition (Michael York), the head of Powers' organisation is meant to be a combined parody of both M (as portrayed by Bernard Lee and Robert Brown) and Q (Desmond Llewelyn).
- Alotta Fagina (Fabiana Udenio) is a parody, in name, of the Bond girl Pussy Galore (Honor Blackman).
- Goldmember (Mike Myers), like Auric Goldfinger (Gert Fröbe), also had a passion for gold; he also possessed a golden gun similar to that used by Francisco Scaramanga (Christopher Lee), the villain of The Man with the Golden Gun.
- Colonel Rosa Klebb (Lotte Lenya) in the Bond film From Russia with Love and Irma Bunt (Ilse Steppat) from On Her Majesty's Secret Service are said to be the prototypes of Frau Greta Farbissina (Mindy Sterling), a top villain in Dr. Evil's organisation.
- Emilio Largo (Adolfo Celi), the SPECTRE villain from Thunderball is parodied in every Austin Powers film as Number Two (Robert Wagner).
- Random Task (Joe Son) is identical to Goldfinger's henchman, Oddjob (Harold Sakata), except he throws a shoe instead of a bowler hat.

==== Daniel Craig cameo in Star Wars ====
In the 2015 movie Star Wars: The Force Awakens directed by J. J. Abrams, after the main character, Rey (Daisy Ridley), is captured by the First Order, she uses the Force to convince a stormtrooper into setting her free. The actor who played the stormtrooper was Daniel Craig, and the crew of The Force Awakens unofficially dubbed the character "FN-007", in reference to Craig's role as James Bond. Fans adopted this name, as well as "JB-007", for the character. However, the 2016 video game Lego Star Wars: The Force Awakens identified the character as FN-1824, which is now considered his official name.

==== Other parodies ====
- Hot Enough for June, a.k.a. Agent 8 3/4 (1964), a British spy comedy with Dirk Bogarde.
- Carry On Spying (1964), British parody with Charles Hawtrey's intended character name James Bind, Agent 006 1/2 changed to Charlie Bind, Agent 000 (Double 0, oh!) for copyright reasons.
- That Man from Rio (1964), French adventure spoof of Bond-type films.
- Le Tigre aime la chair fraiche (1964), Le Tigre se parfume à la dynamite (1965), and Blue Panther, a.k.a. Marie Chantal contre Dr. (1965), French trilogy directed by Claude Chabrol.
- 008: Operation Exterminate (1965), featuring MacDonald (Ingrid Schoeller), Agent 008, female 007 type agent. Directed by Umberto Lenzi.
- Agent 077: Mission Bloody Mary and Agent 077 From the Orient with Fury (both 1965), Italian Eurospy adventures starring Ken Clark.
- Two Mafiosi Against Goldfinger (1965). One of many Italian Eurospy films that spoof the James Bond formula. Also known as The Amazing Dr. G.
- Slå først, Frede! aka Strike First Freddy (1965) and its successor Slap af, Frede! aka Relax Freddie (1966) are Danish parodies directed by Erik Balling. Frede Hansen was played by Morten Grunwald.
- Dr. Goldfoot and the Bikini Machine (1965) and Dr. Goldfoot and the Girl Bombs (1966) satirise the James Bond films, particularly Goldfinger.
- The Intelligence Men (1965), broad farce with British comic duo Eric Morecambe and Ernie Wise.
- Licensed to Kill (1965), Where the Bullets Fly (1966) and Somebody's Stolen Our Russian Spy (1976), a low budget series featuring Agent Charles Vine (Tom Adams) is more imitative than satirical.
- Our Man Flint (1966) and In Like Flint (1967), star James Coburn as Derek Flint, "an intentionally over-the-top parody of Bond".
- Kiss the Girls and Make Them Die (1966), Italian spoof of the Bond films with Mike Connors.
- The Last of the Secret Agents? (1966), Allen & Rossi comedy with Nancy Sinatra.
- Lucky, the Inscrutable, aka Lucky, el intrépido (1966), gag-filled Spanish-Italian comedy from Jesús Franco starring Ray Danton.
- Modesty Blaise (1966), campy British spy-fi film starring Monica Vitti. Although based upon a serious action-adventure comic strip, the film took a camp-comedy approach (similar to that of the Matt Helm films).
- Secret Agent Super Dragon (1966), Italian Eurospy film starring Ray Danton.
- The Spy with a Cold Nose (1966), British parody of secret agent films.
- The Man Called Flintstone (1966), animated film continuation of The Flintstones TV series, spoofing Bond films. The TV series itself had also spoofed Goldfinger in the episode "The Stonefinger Caper".
- Casino Royale (1967), satirical adaptation of Ian Fleming's novel starring David Niven, Peter Sellers and Ursula Andress, amongst others. It is the second of three adaptations of the novel, the first being the 1954 version and the third being the 2006 version. Several aspects of the Bond franchise are parodied, including a reference to Sean Connery's Bond as a "sexual acrobat who leaves a trail of beautiful dead women like blown roses behind him".
- Si muore solo una volta (1967), Italian ("You only die once") starring Ray Danton.
- The End of Agent W4C (1967), Czech parody. Super agent Cyril Juan W4C (Jan Kačer) has all properties of 007 - artificial gadgets, nice girls and spies everywhere around them.
- The Greek film Help! It's Vengos, Overt Agent '000' (Greek: Βοήθεια! Ο Βέγγος φανερός πράκτωρ 000) (1967) and its sequel Thou-Vou Bald Agent, Operation Havoc (Greek: Θου-Βου φαλακρός πράκτωρ, επιχείρησις «Γης Μαδιάμ») (1969). The films follow spy Thou Vou (Thanasis Veggos) constantly getting involved in comedic situations and failing the missions assigned to him. He also looks up to James Bond as a role model.
- O.K. Connery, 1967, also known as Operation Kid Brother or Operation Double 007 stars Neil Connery, Daniela Bianchi, Adolfo Celi, Bernard Lee, Anthony Dawson and Lois Maxwell. When MI6's top agent becomes unavailable, his lookalike younger brother Neil Connery is hired to thwart an evil organisation. Sean Connery's younger brother Neil Connery stars in this Italian film designed to profit from the spy craze. This film features several actors who had appeared in the real Bond series, including Adolfo Celi and Daniela Bianchi. Bernard Lee and Lois Maxwell make cameos parodying their roles as M and Miss Moneypenny.
- A Man Called Dagger (1967), a low budget American spy film. Future Bond villain Richard Kiel (Jaws) co-stars.
- Fathom (1967), stars Raquel Welch as Fathom Harvill, a female Bond-like agent in a tongue-in-cheek spy caper.
- Come Spy with Me (1967), American spy film featuring a female agent Jill Parsons (Andrea Dromm) and also starring Troy Donahue.
- Caprice (1967), American comedy-thriller with Doris Day.
- Az oroszlán ugrani készül (1969), (English translation: The Lion Prepares to Jump), a Hungarian comedy spy film starring István Bujtor.
- The Girl from Rio aka Future Woman (1969), campy spy-fi starring Shirley Eaton (from Goldfinger).
- Zeta One (1969), a British sexploitation spy-fi with Robin Hawdon as James Word, a womanizing secret agent who investigates criminal mastermind Major Bourdon (James Robertson Justice) at the behest of W (Lionel Murton) and discovers a race of barely-clad alien superwoman called Angvians. The film costarred Carry On veteran Charles Hawtrey and Dawn Addams (star of Star Maidens and an occasional leading lady in Roger Moore's The Saint) as Zeta.
- Boter Kaas en Eieren (1969), a Dutch student parody with special agent James Klont (Hein van Laarhoven), which has the task to stop an evil organisation to which has his eye on the national aviation laboratory.
- Le Magnifique (1973), French comedy starring Jean-Paul Belmondo and Jacqueline Bisset.
- From Hong Kong with Love (1975) starred les Charlots, Mickey Rooney, Clifton James, Lois Maxwell and Bernard Lee. The film is a French spoof featuring the comedy team Les Charlots ("The Crazy Boys"). In the film, James Bond dies in the gun barrel sequence. After Queen Elizabeth (Huguette Funfrock) is kidnapped by Marty (Mickey Rooney), a crazed billionaire, Her Majesty's Secret Service replace Bond with a team of goofy French agents, played by the Crazy Boys. Bernard Lee and Lois Maxwell briefly appear as M and Moneypenny (their characters remaining unnamed). Originally released as Bons baisers de Hong Kong.
- The Dragon Lives Again (1977). Starring: Alexander Grand. A Hong Kong movie featuring Bruce Lee (Bruce Leung Siu-Lung) in the afterlife alongside characters such as Popeye (Eric Tsang), Count Dracula (Hsi Chang), and James Bond (Alexander Grand). Original title: La Resurrection du Dragon
- Once Upon a Spy (1980), a TV movie co-starring Ted Danson.
- S*H*E (1980), an American spy parody film starring Cornelia Sharpe and Omar Sharif and written by regular Bond screenwriter Richard Maibaum.
- The Cannonball Run (1981) is an American action-comedy film that features an all-star ensemble cast, including Burt Reynolds, Dom DeLuise, Roger Moore, Farrah Fawcett, Jackie Chan, Sammy Davis Jr. and Dean Martin. In the film, Roger Moore plays a parody of both James Bond and himself. He plays Seymour Goldfarb Jr., a rich British playboy who believes himself to be Roger Moore and drives a silver Aston Martin DB5. He is frequently shown evading police by using various James Bond-type gadgets, such as oil slicks, smoke screens, switchable license plates, all installed in his Aston Martin DB5.
- Nati con la camicia, also known as Go for It (1983), an Italian comedy spy action film, starring Terence Hill and Bud Spencer as Rosco Frazer and Doug O'Riordan, two strangers accidentally mistaken for CIA operatives. The film features several Bond tropes, including K1 (Buffy Dee), a megalomaniac villain (a spoof of Blofeld, petting a Basset Hound dog instead of a white cat) bent on world domination, employing several henchmen, and the agents using various gadgets to fight them.
- Aces Go Places 3: Our Man from Bond street, also known as Mad Mission 3, a 1984 Hong Kong action comedy featuring a James Bond-like character King Kong (Sam Hui), as well as various references to the official film series, including appearances by Neil Connery, Richard Kiel and an Oddjob-like character played by Tsuneharu Sugiyama.
- James Bone, Agent 001 (1986), a Filipino action comedy starring Palito, whose emaciated figure gave the film its title.
- Cat City, also known as Macskafogó (1986), a Hungarian-Canadian-German animated comedy action film which heavily spoofs the Bond movies. The main character is an anthropomorphic mouse secret agent named Grabovsky (voiced by László Sinkó). As another variation of the Blofeld trope, the main villain of the film is Mr. Fritz Teufel (voiced by Miklós Benedek), a white cat himself.
- Philip (Michael David), Agent 007-11 is a parody of James Bond in the film Ninja Academy (1990). In the film 007-11 gets his license to kill temporarily revoked.
- If Looks Could Kill aka Teen Agent (1991) directed by William Dear, starring Richard Grieco and Linda Hunt is a mistaken-identity caper.
- From Beijing with Love (1994), written by and starring Stephen Chow as Ling-ling-chat, a Chinese 007 wanna-be searching for a stolen dinosaur skull
- Pub Royale (1996), a parody based on the novel of Casino Royale starring Alan Carr.
- Spy Hard (1996), starring Leslie Nielsen and Nicollette Sheridan.
- Never Say Never Mind: The Swedish Bikini Team (2001), a British spoof, featuring a team of beautiful women as the Bondian heroines.
- Undercover Brother (2002)
- Rod Steele 0014: You Only Live Until You Die (2002) starring Robert Donavan is a lightly pornographic Bond parody based loosely on Milo Manara's comics.
- The Tuxedo (2002), a film about a taxi driver called Jimmy Tong (Jackie Chan) who accidentally becomes a spy when he wears a special tuxedo which gives him special skills (martial arts, strength, dancing, singing, sniper skills, etc.).
- Johnny English (2003), a James Bond spoof starring Rowan Atkinson, and its two sequels, Johnny English Reborn (2011) and Johnny English Strikes Again (2018).
- Looney Tunes: Back in Action (2003) widely parodies James Bond, with a film poster for Licence to Spy, a parody of Licence to Kill, More is Never Enough, parodying either The World Is Not Enough or Never Say Never Again and Codename: Operation Conspiracy. The character of Mother (Joan Cusack) simultaneously satirizes M and Q, there is a car highly similar to an Aston Martin DBS loaded with gadgets (which serves Bugs Bunny (voiced by Joe Alaskey) a carrot martini shaken, not stirred), the penultimate scene parodies Moonraker, and the film character Damian Drake's movies parodying the success of the James Bond films. Drake is even played by former James Bond actor Timothy Dalton. The character Dusty Tails (Heather Locklear) could also be a simultaneous reference to the Bond girl and Shirley Bassey, who sang three of the themes to the James Bond film series.
- The Pink Panther (2006) features a sequence in which Inspector Jacques Clouseau (Steve Martin) meets British Agent 006 (played by a tuxedo-clad, uncredited Clive Owen), to whom Clouseau refers to "one short of the big time".
- Allkopi Royale (2006), a short Bond spoof starring Thomas Milligan and Quantum for Allkopi (2008), a sequel to Allkopi Royale, featuring Norwegian celebrities such as Linni Meister, Helge Hammelow-Berg and Martin Garfalk.
- Epic Movie (2007), James Bond (Darko Belgrade), in a parody of Casino Royale, makes two short appearances in Gnarnia.
- Meet the Spartans (2008), Le Chiffre (Ike Barinholtz) appears, torturing Leonidas (Sean Maguire) for the account number in a similar manner to the way he did in Casino Royale. The condition that causes Le Chiffre to weep blood is also parodied, with his tear duct gushing throughout the segment.
- OSS 117: Cairo, Nest of Spies (2006) and OSS 117: Lost in Rio (2009), two French comedies that parody the original OSS 117 series by Jean Bruce. The first film is set in 1955 and the sequel in 1967. Both movies, which star Jean Dujardin as French secret agent Hubert Bonisseur de La Bath a.k.a. OSS 117, parody and recreate the look and style of espionage films from the 1950s and 1960s.
- Danger Mouse (1981 and 2015) is an animation series about a British, gadget-using, flying car-driving secret agent mouse, taking orders from Colonel K (a chinchilla) to counter the dastardly schemes of Baron Silas Greenback (a frog) who pets a fuzzy white caterpillar like Blofeld's Persian cat.
- Cars 2 (2011) is a spy movie starring Finn McMissile, who is the car version of James Bond and is an Aston Martin, the same model that Bond drove in his novels.

In addition to the above, there have been literally hundreds of films made around the world parodying the spy film genre of the 1960s, if not directly parodying James Bond. One example is the 1966 film Modesty Blaise, which was a parody of the spy genre rather than a faithful adaptation of the (generally serious) comic strip.

=== Imitative films ===
Numerous films have attempted to use the James Bond formula; some have used the character of James Bond unofficially.

- G-2 (1965), a Filipino movie starring Tony Ferrer as Tony Falcon: Agent X44, the Filipino James Bond equivalent. G-2 was the first of 16 Agent X44 movies released in the Philippines.
- Kiss Kiss...Bang Bang (1966), Italian Eurospy film with Giuliano Gemma.
- Lightning Bolt aka Operazione Goldman (1966) - one of many low-budget Italian Eurospy films.
- One Spy Too Many (1966), feature film release of 2-part TV episode of The Man from U.N.C.L.E.
- Secret Agent Fireball (1966), standard Italian Eurospy film of the period.
- Spy in Your Eye (1966), Italian spy-fi espionage tale.
- Agent for H.A.R.M. (1966), failed TV pilot released as a feature film.
- Dimension 5 (1966), derivative spy-fi yarn involving time travel.
- The Venetian Affair (1967), capitalises on star Robert Vaughn's image from The Man from U.N.C.L.E. series.
- Hammerhead (1968), Vince Edwards trades in his Ben Casey scrubs for a tuxedo in this campy, imitative James Bond knock-off.
- James Bond 777 (1971), low-budget Indian-made 007 movie with Ghattamaneni Krishna as a pompadoured, moustachioed James Bond.
- Shut Up When You Speak (1981), Aldo Maccione plays Giacomo ("James" in Italian), who dreams that he is James Bond. Original title: Tais Toi Quand Tu Parles.
- Agent 000 and the Deadly Curves (1983), Ilmari Saarelainen plays Joonas G. Breitenfeldt, Agent 000, who attempts to stop the masked villain's organisation (a spoof of SPECTRE). Original title: Agentti 000 ja kuoleman kurvit.
- The Mahjong Incident (1987), Chinese thriller concerning a priceless jade mahjong piece. James Bond (portrayed by Ron Cohen, an American businessman who just happened to be spotted by director Xiaoyang Yu while on vacation) has a brief cameo. Also known as The Green Jade Mahjong.
- Mr. Bond (1992), Indian-made musical, starring Akshay Kumar. As with several other Bond ripoffs, the character is never referred to as "James Bond", remaining simply Mr. Bond throughout the entire movie.
- XXX (2002), borrows heavily from James Bond and includes gadgets and so forth that are similar to some found in a Bond film. Its sequel, XXX: State of the Union, was directed by Lee Tamahori, who had previously directed Die Another Day.

== Internet ==
- Season 5 of the YouTube channel Epic Rap Battles of History features a rap-battle video called "James Bond vs Austin Powers" (released 14 June 2016), which James Bond makes an appearance and is represented by Ben Atha (as the Daniel Craig version) and EpicLLoyd (as the Sean Connery version).
- The gadgetry, titles, characters, product promotion and plots were parodied on the site Michael and Joel at the Movies.
- Greenpeace UK produced an animated parody called Coalfinger (October 2008), featuring the voices of David Mitchell and Brian Blessed.
- During the opening ceremony animated intro sequence of Minecon London 2015, animated by Element Animation for Mojang Studios, a collection of James Bond-inspired British secret agent Minecraft Villagers (voiced by Dan Lloyd) are shown guiding the main character Villager of the short to Minecon.

== Music ==
- Johnny Rivers' song "Secret Agent Man" from his 1966 album ...And I Know You Wanna Dance uses the surf rock style of the "James Bond Theme". However, although its subject is secret agents and spies, the song was not composed as a reference to Bond but rather as the theme song for American broadcasts of the United Kingdom series Danger Man, which aired in the US under the title Secret Agent. The song was also covered by Devo on their 1979 album Duty Now for the Future. Its lyrics do, however, refer to the fact the agent described in the song has been assigned a code number. Ironically, John Drake (Patrick McGoohan), the lead character of Danger Man/Secret Agent was never actually referred to by a code number.
- British rock band Terrorvision's album Regular Urban Survivors (1996) features sleeve artwork reminiscent of spy movies in general, and Bond in particular. It features a painted cover, depicting the band members in a montage of Bond-like poses.
- The Cavaliers Drum and Bugle Corps' 2004 show "007," which placed first at the DCI World Championship Finals, uses musical selections and takes visual design inspiration from the James Bond movies.
- Toy Dolls gives a humorous account of James Bond's off-duty relations to his neighbours in their song "James Bond Lives Down Our Street".
- WAW Wild Aaron Wilde released three songs in 2013 on the Total Eclipse label, called "Spy Fool", "Diamonds Are Very Shiny", and "Old Whinger", all in the style of James Bond songs.
- The music video for the Miike Snow song "Genghis Khan" from his 2016 album iii depicts a super villain (Adam Jones) falling in love with a spy in a tuxedo (Edward Hayes Neary), who he was going to kill with a deadly laser modeled after the attempt to kill James Bond in Goldfinger.

== Novels ==
- Mack Bolan, alias "The Executioner", is a tougher, American James Bond-inspired character created by Don Pendleton, who has featured in over 600 serialized novels with sales, as of 1995, of more than 200 million books.
- The Book of Bond, or, Every Man His Own 007, sanctioned by Glidrose Productions, is a tongue-in-cheek guide to being a superspy. It was credited to "Lt.-Col. William 'Bill' Tanner" (a literary Fleming character), but was actually written by Kingsley Amis, who would subsequently write the Bond novel, Colonel Sun under another pseudonym, Robert Markham. The book's first hardcover edition had a false slipcover giving the title as The Bible to be Read as Literature (in the novel From Russia, with Love, a fake book with this title hides a gun). The paperback edition was published by Pan Books, formatted the same as its regular James Bond novels.
- Similarly, James Bond's popularity has spurred other writers and book packagers to cash in on the spy craze by launching female-spy alternative versions, such as The Baroness by Paul Kenyon, The Lady From L.U.S.T. spy thrillers by Rod Gray, and Cherry Delight by Glen Chase. The sexy superspy Baroness novels used many Bond references and formulae, such as the title of the second novel Diamonds Are For Dying, culinary and gastronomic descriptive passages, and plot themes.
- Michael K. Frith and Christopher B. Cerf of the Harvard Lampoon wrote Alligator, by "I*n Fl*m*ng" in 1962. Another "J*mes B*nd" story titled "Toadstool" appeared in a Playboy magazine parody published by the Lampoon. Rumour has it this has not been reprinted because of plagiarism issues (some sections are very close to Fleming.) The cover of Alligator parodies the Signet Books paperback covers used for the Fleming novels in the 1960s, including a short Fl*m*ng biography, and a bibliography of nonexistent B*nd novels: Lightningrod, For Tomorrow We Live, The Chigro of the Narcissus, Toadstool, Doctor Popocatapetl, From Berlin, Your Obedient Servant, Monsieur Butterfly, and Scuba Do - Or Die.
- There exists a very short book titled Pussy L'amour and the Three Bears starring James Bear. Although the book James Bond: The Legacy mentions it, one known copy exists.
- Sol Weinstein wrote four novels about Israel Bond, Agent Oy-Oy-Seven, beginning in 1965: Loxfinger; Matzohball; In the Secret Service of His Majesty – the Queen; and You Only Live Until You Die. As with the Harvard Lampoon volumes mentioned above, the covers of the American editions of the Israel Bond books were also based upon the cover designs Signet Books used for Fleming's Bond novels.
- Cyril Connolly wrote the short story "Bond Strikes Camp", satirising a homosexual relationship between M and Bond.
- Between 1965 and 1968, paperback writer William Knoles - sometimes described as "the greatest unknown writer of our time" - penned 20 novels featuring the character Trevor Anderson, codenamed "0008", under the pseudonym Clyde Allison. The series is variously described as "0008" or "The Man From SADISTO," and spoofs both Bond and The Man From U.N.C.L.E. among other icons of espionage. The books were published by adult publisher William Hamling, edited by Earl Kemp and featured seventeen "cover paintings by Robert Bonfils," many also with "hand-lettered titles by Harry Bremner." The series stretches from Our Man From SADISTO (1965) to The Desert Damsels (1968), and also features plots containing spoof characters based on Batman and Modesty Blaise among other heroes.
- Mabel Maney has written two Bond parodies, Kiss the Girls and Make Them Spy and The Girl with the Golden Bouffant. The two parodies are based on the character of Jane Bond, James' lesbian sister, who is called upon to replace her brother when he is incapacitated.
- An Agent 00005 appeared in the science fiction epic The Illuminatus! Trilogy by Robert Shea and Robert Anton Wilson, published in the early 1970s. This character, named Fission Chips, is a somewhat dim-witted Englishman working for British Intelligence, taking orders from a superior named "W." A fan of Ian Fleming's novels, 00005 has patterned his life after James Bond and is obsessed with an organisation known as "B.U.G.G.E.R." (a reference to SPECTRE) which he might have completely fabricated.
- Bridge experts Philip and Robert King wrote a collection of bridge game-related short stories titled Your Deal, Mr. Bond; the title story features 007. (This shouldn't be confused with the official Bond novel, No Deals, Mr. Bond by John Gardner.)
- Kim Newman's novel Dracula Cha Cha Cha features a vampire agent of the Diogenes Club named "Hamish Bond". The segments of the novel featuring this character are filled with references to the James Bond novels and films, including chapters titled "On Her Majesty's Secret Service", "From Bavaria with Love", "Live and Let Die" and "The Living Daylights". Bond's archenemy is a vampiric Blofeld (although there's a twist), and an alteration in his personality, towards the end, portrays the change from Sean Connery to Roger Moore.
- Clive Cussler's novel Night Probe! has its hero Dirk Pitt alternately oppose and work with "Brian Shaw," a retired British Secret Service agent recalled to duty who had taken a pseudonym for protection from his many enemies. The book makes abundantly clear, explicitly so in the two characters' final conversation, that "Shaw" is Bond.
- Bond is parodied as Roger Laser in The Fellowship of the Thing by John Salonia, published by Scarlet Succubus Press in 2001. Laser is shanghaied by an alien scientist to serve as a spy/commando.
- Dr. No Will See You Now is a short piece by English humourist Alan Coren, featuring a geriatric Bond, still-virginal Moneypenny and nonagenarian 'M'.
- Simon R. Green wrote the Secret History book series, which involves a Bond-like investigator of Fantasy and SF criminals, including titles like The Man with the Golden Torc and Daemons Are Forever.
- The Laundry Files by Charles Stross

== Television ==
=== 2012 London Summer Olympics ===
- In an advertisement for London's 2012 Olympic bid, Roger Moore and Samantha Bond played Bond and Miss Moneypenny.
- Daniel Craig played Bond in a short film, Happy and Glorious, made by the BBC, produced by Lisa Osborne, and directed by Danny Boyle as part of the opening ceremony of the 2012 London Olympics. In the film, Bond is summoned to Buckingham Palace by Queen Elizabeth II—played by herself—and escorts her by helicopter to the Olympic Stadium. Bond and the Queen jump from the helicopter into the stadium with Union Flag parachutes. After the film was shown, the Queen appeared and formally opened the Games.

=== Television specials and series ===
- Lois Maxwell reprises the role of Moneypenny in Eon Productions' television special Welcome to Japan, Mr. Bond (1967), which was intended to promote You Only Live Twice and contained a storyline of Moneypenny trying to establish the identity of Bond's bride.
- The American television series Get Smart (1965–70) features Don Adams as the consummate Bond spoof, Maxwell Smart, a self-assured but incompetent bungler (the character was also inspired by Inspector Clouseau as played by Peter Sellers), who got by on a combination of luck and the help of his savvy female counterpart Agent 99 (Barbara Feldon), in an ongoing battle with a quasi-Soviet enemy entity known as KAOS, with use of esoteric and often unreliable or useless gadgets such as his shoe phone. The series later spun off a 1980 feature film sequel, The Nude Bomb, a 1989 TV-movie, Get Smart, Again!, and a short-lived 1995 TV series revival. It was later adapted as an eponymous 2008 movie. Don Adams also voiced the title character in Inspector Gadget, an animated Get Smart parody television series. Adams also either spoofed or directly reprised the role of Smart in numerous TV commercials.

=== Television episodes and arcs ===
==== Adventures of Captain Wrongel ====
In the 1976 Soviet animated series Adventures of Captain Wrongel, Agent 00X (voiced by Grigory Shpigel) is a comic version of Bond, he almost catches criminals in each episode, but at the last moment he fails, which is usually ended by his cruel death. Of course, he is resurrected at the start of next episode.

==== American Dad! ====
The series American Dad! featured two parody episodes of Bond films, first with the 2008 season 4 episode "Tearjerker" and then the 2013 season 9 episode "For Black Eyes Only". The character Stan Smith (voiced by Seth MacFarlane) appears as a parody of James Bond. His wife Francine Smith (Wendy Schaal) appears as Sexpun T'Come, Brian Lewis (Kevin Michael Richardson) is Black Villain, Roger Smith (MacFarlane) is Tearjerker, Klaus Heisler (Dee Bradley Baker) is Tchochkie Schmear and Avery Bullock (Patrick Stewart) is B. In "For Black Eyes Only", Stan marries Sexpun T'Come after the events of "Tearjerker". However, Black Villain kills Sexpun by accident (he was actually going to kill Stan, but misses and shoots Sexpun instead). One year later, Stan hears that Black Villain will do something evil by melting the Arctic with hair dryers, and his boss B tells Stan that Tearjerker is still alive. He then finds Tearjerker in an underground jail and tells him to partner up with Stan. Tearjerker said that he used to work for Black Villain, but he betrays him. They then go to a market to find Tearjerker's partner Tchochkie Schmear, but he was killed by a black mysterious woman. Stan finds out that the black woman was a clone of Sexpun named Sexpuneequa that Black Villain created but made black. Tearjerker betrays Stan and works for Black Villain again. Stan tells Sexpuneequa that he is her husband, but she disagrees (Stan gives Sexpuneequa a photo locket of their wedding, but she throws it in a fire). He brings back her memories by having her suck his toes (Sexpun did the same before Black Villain kills her) and she teams up with Stan to stop Tearjerker and Black Villain. Black Villain then starts the hair dryers to melt the Arctic before Stan and Sexpun appear. The two villains try to stop the two by releasing clones of Tearjerker, but fails (the clones attack each other, then kiss each other before committing suicide). Then a big wave of water appears, but Stan, Sexpuneequa, and Tearjerker escape while Black Villain was left behind and drowns. While they escape, Sexpuneequa asked why they helped Tearjerker escape and kicks him and is stabbed by a pointed shark. Stan and Sexpuneequa make out until B called him. He congratulates Stan for his work, even when the half of the world was drowned and sees the two making out. Meanwhile, Tearjerker survives and was to come out of the shark, but a killer whale appears and grabs the shark's tail and drags the both of them when white letters appears on the top of the screen, saying "To be continued" and "Or was it?".

==== The Backyardigans ====
The Backyardigans' 2007 double-length episode "International Super Spy" portrays Pablo (voiced by Jake Goldberg) as a parody of James Bond. He wears a tuxedo in the episode and is seen adjusting his bow tie frequently. He goes through the episode trying to recover the 3 Silver Containers before Uniqua (LaShawn Jeffries), the Lady in Pink and her henchman Tyrone (Jordan Coleman) does. Tasha (Naelee Rae) plays the head of the International Super Spy Agency, an obvious parody of M and Austin (Jonah Bobo) plays his secret contact throughout the episode. Austin may be a parody of Q because he gives Pablo a video phone disguised as a banana split, a cell phone disguised as a hot dog, an astral projection device that is disguised as a snow cone, and finally he gives him a jet pack disguised as a pizza and a pizza-shaped parachute. He also has a car with many different flying attachments (like a jet, helicopter and a glider). Like the real James Bond, Pablo is able to withstand pain when he is subjected to the Lady in Pink's tickle table and he likes his apple juice, "Shaken Not Stirred".

==== The Beverly Hillbillies ====
Inspired by the Sean Connery Bond films, Jethro Bodine became a "double naught spy" in the March 1965 episode "Double Naught Jethro" in season three Season 3 of The Beverly Hillbillies. Double naught 10 Jethro Bodine would return in the October 1965 episode "The Private Eye".

==== BoJack Horseman ====
In "Later", a 2014 season 1 episode of BoJack Horseman, after publication of his ghost-written memoir, BoJack Horseman (voiced by Will Arnett) is offered a role as the villain of a Bond film titled 007 Goldhoof. BoJack's agent Princess Carolyn (Amy Sedaris) informs BoJack of the offer, which he declines.

==== DuckTales ====
In the 1987 episode of DuckTales entitled Double-O-Duck, Launchpad McQuack ineptly poses as a gadget laden spy who confronts Dr Nogood. This episode would serve as one of the inspirations for the animated series Darkwing Duck.

==== Gilligan's Island ====
In Season 3 of the series Gilligan's Island, Episode 11 (titled "The Invasion" and first aired on November 21, 1966) begins with Gilligan and The Skipper fishing at the lagoon. They reel in a briefcase marked "Property US Government. DO NOT OPEN." The Professor insists that the case must remain closed, but it accidentally pops open long enough for the castaways to realize it contains top-secret documents. They surmise that enemies of the US are likely after the briefcase. And to make matters worse, Gilligan inadvertently handcuffs himself to it. That night, Gilligan dreams he's a spy named Agent 0–14. He meets with the chief of the Good Guy Spy Outfit (played by the Professor) and demonstrates how his toiletry kit contains several weapons. Mary Ann poses as the Professor's secretary but is actually Evil Agent 10. She communicates to Mr. Evil (played by a bald Mr. Howell) through her makeup compact and then tries to shoot Gilligan with a loaded chrysanthemum. Ginger is Evil Agent 5. After communicating with Mr. Evil through a soup ladle, she tries to kill Gilligan with poison lipstick. Evil Agent 1 (the Skipper) poses as Gilligan's mother and tries to get the briefcase while serving him a bowl of homemade soup. Gilligan escapes all of these situations and shows up at the office of Mr. Evil and his assistant (played by Mrs. Howell). After Gilligan foils their final attempt to get the case, Evil Agent Lovey tells Gilligan: "Now I know why they call you 0-14. You're twice as smart as 0-0-7."

==== MADtv ====
Jane Bond is the name of a fictional spy played by supermodel Claudia Schiffer in "For Your Files Only", a recurring sketch from the first season of MADtv from 1995 to 1996. In an obvious spoof of James Bond (For Your Eyes Only), Jane Bond went undercover as a temporary office secretary in order to stop an evil corporation (led by Dr. Boss, played by Mary Scheer and her office manager, Part-Time Job, played by Artie Lange) from taking over the world. Instead of having a licence to kill like James Bond, Jane Bond has a licence to collate. Immediately after making her famous introduction, "[My/The name is] Bond, Jane Bond" to Dr. Boss, Bond proceeds to remove the clip that was holding her hair up (and then shaking it out in a prolonged slow motion shot).

Jane Bond's gadgets includes standard office supplies like slingshot-like rubber bands (which she uses during a major office shootout), an extremely sharpened right index fingernail (which she uses to free herself from being tied up in rope), Whack Out (which she uses to subdue Part-Time Job, after initially seducing him), and a stapler (which she uses to defeat Dr. Boss, who had plans on killing Bond via a nitroglycerin filled water cooler). After defeating Dr. Boss, Bond proclaims that she likes her villains "Stapled, not stirred!"

Jane Bond's further adventures include:

- "Octotempy" (a parody of Octopussy)
- "The Man with the Golden Parachute" (a parody of The Man with the Golden Gun)
- "On Her Majesty's Temporary Service" (a parody of On Her Majesty's Secret Service)
- "You Only Temp Twice" (a parody of You Only Live Twice)
- "Moontemper" (a parody of Moonraker)
- "Dr. No-Raise" (a parody of Dr. No)
- "Thunder Ball-Point" (a parody of Thunderball)
- "The Spy Who Hired Me" (a parody of The Spy Loved Me)
- "From Russia with Overtime" (a parody of From Russia with Love)
- "The Living Day Jobs" (a parody of The Living Daylights)
- "License to Type" (a parody of Licence to Kill)
- "Tempfinger" (a parody of Goldfinger)

==== The Office ====
A 2011 seventh season episode of The Office, "Threat Level Midnight", is a film made by Michael Scott (Steve Carell) with him as Michael Scarn, the best secret agent in the business, and Jim Halpert (John Krasinski) as Goldenface, a spoof of Goldfinger.

==== Sabrina: The Animated Series ====
In an episode of the 1999 animated adaption of Sabrina the Teenage Witch, "La Femme Sabrina", the video release of Harvey Kinkle (voiced by Bill Switzer)'s favorite spy film, On Her Majesty's Expense Account (a parody of On Her Majesty's Secret Service) was postponed. So Sabrina Spellman (Emily Hart) uses magic to get him a copy of the spy film that he wanted, but backfired the world into an actual spy flick. The episode parodies numerous James Bond references including the gun barrel sequence, a parody of Auric Goldfinger named Furfinger portrayed by Salem Saberhagen (Nick Bakay), and numerous James Bond film titles including:

- On Her Majesty's Expense Account (a parody of On Her Majesty's Secret Service)
- From East Bayonne with Love (a parody of From Russia with Love)
- Dr. Indecisive (a parody of Dr. No)
- The Spy Who Sorta Had A Crush on Me (a parody of The Spy Who Loved Me)
- Thundernuggets (a parody of Thunderball)

==== The Simpsons ====
A 1998 eighth season episode of The Simpsons, "You Only Move Twice", features the supervillain, Hank Scorpio (voiced by Albert Brooks). The James Bond analogue, Mr. Bont (Dan Castellaneta), is based on Sean Connery's portrayal but he is captured and killed because Homer Simpson (Castellaneta) interferes with his attempted escape from captivity.

The final scene at Globex contains references to several James Bond films. The episode title and many references are from You Only Live Twice, with A View to a Kill also being referenced. Mr. Bont, a character modeled after Sean Connery's Bond is tackled by Homer and killed after a parody of the laser scene from Goldfinger. Miss Goodthighs (Tress MacNeille), a character sharing a name with Giovanna Goodthighs (Jacqueline Bisset) from the 1967 James Bond spoof Casino Royale makes an appearance in the episode and a character based on Norman Schwarzkopf is attacked by Goodthighs. The incident is also a reference to the character Xenia Onatopp (Famke Janssen), from GoldenEye, who specialises in crushing men between her thighs.

The song at the end of the show, written by Ken Keeler, is a parody of various Bond themes. Keeler originally wrote it to be three seconds longer and sound more like the theme song "Goldfinger", but the final version was shorter and the lyrics were sped up. The writers wanted the song to be sung by Shirley Bassey, who sang several Bond themes, but they could not get her to record the part and Sally Stevens recorded it instead.

This is not the only James Bond homage in The Simpsons, however—the "Chief Wiggum P.I." segment of "The Simpsons Spin-Off Showcase" episode borrows heavily from Live and Let Die, even duplicating certain shots. Also, in an alleged "deleted scene" from "$pringfield (or, How I Learned to Stop Worrying and Love Legalized Gambling)" from the 1995 season 10 "The Simpsons 138th Episode Spectacular" clip show, Homer, working as a blackjack dealer, causes James Bond to lose to Blofeld, with Oddjob and Jaws as his henchmen, when Homer fails to take out the Joker card and a card for the "Rules for Draw and Stud Poker" out of a playing deck. In addition, an opening couch gag features Homer as Bond in the gun barrel sequence that opens the Bond films. The character Rainier Wolfcastle (Harry Shearer), an action movie actor, also regularly references Bond. Also, the 2001 season 13 episode "Treehouse of Horror XII" featured a computer run house with a selection of actor voices. When Bart Simpson (Nancy Cartwright) suggests some 007, Marge Simpson (Julie Kavner) asks "George Lazenby?" only to get slightly disappointed when Lisa Simpson (Yeardley Smith) says "No, Pierce Brosnan."

==== SpongeBob SquarePants ====
The 2007 SpongeBob SquarePants season 5 episode "Spy Buddies" contains a Bond parody. When SpongeBob SquarePants (voiced by Tom Kenny) is told that Mr. Eugene Krabs (Clancy Brown) wants him to spy on Plankton (Mr. Lawrence), SpongeBob gets excited and a scene similar to the James Bond gun barrel sequence starts. SpongeBob walks into the circle, only to find that the circle is Patrick Star (Bill Fagerbakke) looking through a straw.

==== Star Trek: Deep Space Nine ====
The 1995 Star Trek: Deep Space Nine episode "Our Man Bashir" (the tenth episode of the fourth season) features an holosuite program in which the series' 24th-century characters participate in an interactive fictional "secret agent" plot set in a 1960s period universe heavily influenced by the James Bond series. Julian Bashir (Alexander Siddig) assumes the role of the Bond-analogue British secret agent, a portrayal of espionage found entertaining by former spy Elim Garak (Andrew Robinson). The episode, which first aired 10 days after GoldenEye was released theatrically, prompted Metro-Goldwyn-Mayer to voice concerns to Star Trek studio Paramount regarding intellectual property. The secret agent holosuite program made a second, briefer appearance in the series's 1997 episode "A Simple Investigation" (the 17th episode of the fifth season) in which the James Bond references are less overt.

== Video games ==
- The Command & Conquer: Red Alert series features a spy unit for the Allies, depicted in a tuxedo and sounding similar to Sean Connery. In the 1996 game Command & Conquer: Red Alert, the spy (voiced by Adam Isgreen) is unarmed, can disguise himself as enemy soldiers, and sneak past any base defence undetected, only vulnerable to attack dogs or psi corps troopers. The spy unit can infiltrate buildings to shut off power, disable unit production and radar, or steal resources - the 2000 second game allows the unit to capture plans for enemy unique units like Chrono Ivan (Neil Ross) or Psychic Commando (Udo Kier), while the 2008 third game introduces the ability to bribe enemy units into joining the spy unit's side.
- The 2004 computer game Evil Genius is played from the perspective of a stereotypical 1960s "Bond villain" type of character, as the player builds a trap-filled base, trains minions, hires elite henchmen, and fights off agents from various world intelligence agencies. The most difficult of the agents to defeat is the British agent John Steele, based on Bond.
- In the expansion pack to Grand Theft Auto, Grand Theft Auto: London 1969, there is a car called the 'James Bomb' which looks like an Aston Martin. In the 2013 game, Grand Theft Auto V, Franklin Clinton (voiced by Shawn Fonteno) is made to steal a car from the movie studio where it is being used as a prop in an action film. The car, called the JB 700, bears a strong likeness to the Aston Martin in Goldfinger, and shares a number of hidden features with that car, some usable while others are only referred to, such as two forward-facing machine guns, an ejector seat, a metal shield to protect the rear windscreen and deployable caltrops.
- The James Pond series of games parody Bond movies. Levels in a James Pond game use such titles as A View to a Spill and Leak and Let Die.
- In the 1998 game Metal Gear Solid, on the third playthrough of a saved file, Solid Snake (voiced by David Hayter) wears a James Bond-style tuxedo.
- In Metal Gear Solid 3: Snake Eater, the character Major Zero (voiced by Jim Piddock) is a fan of James Bond as revealed during a codec conversation. The protagonist, Naked Snake (Hayter), also chides James Bond as not being a real spy, ironically a meta-reference to the many similarities he has with Bond. The title theme, "Snake Eater" performed by Cynthia Harrell, is also a play on the jazzy pop title tracks from Bond movie, with the lyrics describing nuances in the story and repeating the title multiple times. Also before the title theme the Virtuous Mission may be considered a play on the pre-title sequences of the Bond series.
- No One Lives Forever (released in 2000) and its sequel, No One Lives Forever 2: A Spy in H.A.R.M.'s Way (2002), by Monolith Productions combine elements of James Bond (including Goldeneye 007 and Perfect Dark), feature a female secret agent, Cate Archer (voiced by Kit Harris and Jen Taylor), take place during the 1960s, and are similarly titled to John Gardner's Bond novel, Nobody Lives For Ever.
- In the 2001 video game Operation Flashpoint: Cold War Crisis, a senior US Army Green Beret officer named James Gastovski introduces himself to the game's protagonist 1LT Dave Armstrong (voiced by Jonah Lotan) in a James Bond-like tone ("Gastovski, James Gastovski").
- Operation Thunderbowel (released in 1988) by Sacred Scroll Software is a text based adventure game featuring Shamus Bond going up against Blobum who is attempting to poison the UN with a powerful laxative.
- In the 2003 video game Rayman 3: Hoodlum Havoc, the "Wanna Kick Rayman" lesson number 73 features a Hoodmonger Private First Class who dons a tuxedo and holds up a handgun in a characteristic 007 pose, before producing an enormous, laser-firing satellite dish-like device out of his arm.
- One of the trailers for the 2008 video game Rayman Raving Rabbids: TV Party features a rabbit dressed in a tuxedo singing the "James Bond Theme" in a gun barrel sequence. While singing, he notices the barrel, to which he looks into it and starts singing the rest of the theme into it, only to have a carrot shoot out from the barrel into his mouth.
- Apogee's 1992 series of jump and run games, Secret Agent, is about Agent 006 1/2 tasked with infiltrating the Blofeld-esque hideouts of supervillains directly parodies the James Bond franchise in the setup of its storyline.
- Spy Fox parodies Q, Moneypenny, and various villains
- Spy Muppets: License to Croak is a 2003 video game featuring Muppet characters directly spoofing James Bond characters, plots and titles.
- Some Stuntman missions in the 2002 game require players to race through the streets of Monaco, for the film Live Twice for Tomorrow.
- The 2007 video game Team Fortress 2 includes achievements for the Spy (voiced by Dennis Bateman) character such as "Dr. Nooooo", "For Your Eyes Only", "On Her Majesty's Secret Surface", "The Man with the Broken Guns" and "You Only Shiv Thrice".
- The 2019 video game Pokémon Sword and Shield, which takes place in the Britain-inspired Galar region, features the Pokémon species Inteleon, whose characteristic is an amalgamation of secret agents. Additionally, its first evolution form Sobble is numbered "007" in the game's regional Pokédex.
- The total conversion mod Fallout: London uses a Bond-like character as the "Mysterious Stranger" character that can appear to assist the player in fights.

== See also ==
- Eurospy films
- Outline of James Bond
- Spy film
- Spy-fi (neologism)

== Notes and references ==
Notes

== Bibliography ==
- Benson, Raymond (1988). The James Bond Bedside Companion. London: Boxtree Ltd. ISBN 978-1-85283-233-9.
- Britton, Wesley Alan (2006). Onscreen And Undercover: The Ultimate Book of Movie Espionage. Westport, Connecticut: Greenwood Publishing Group. ISBN 978-0-275-99281-1.
- Britton, Wesley Alan (2004). Spy Television (2 ed.). Westport, Connecticut: Greenwood Publishing Group. ISBN 978-0-275-98163-1.
- Comentale, Edward P; Watt, Stephen; Willman, Skip (2005). Ian Fleming & James Bond: the cultural politics of 007. Indiana University Press. ISBN 978-0-253-21743-1.
- Geraghty, Lincoln (2009). Channeling the Future: Essays on Science Fiction and Fantasy Television. Lanham: Scarecrow Press. ISBN 978-0-8108-6675-1.
- Pfeiffer, Lee; Worrall, Dave (1998). The essential Bond. London: Boxtree Ltd. ISBN 978-0-7522-2477-0.
