= Béla Ternovszky =

Hungarian director

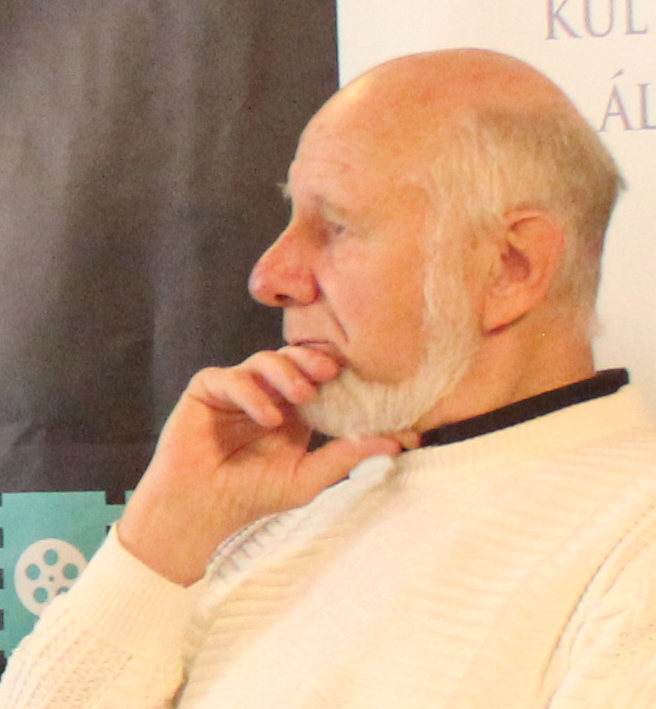

Béla Ternovszky (born 1943) is an animator who has directed film and television programs in Hungary. His 1986 film Cat City was "an instant success with Hungarian audiences" and "has become an international cult classic since".

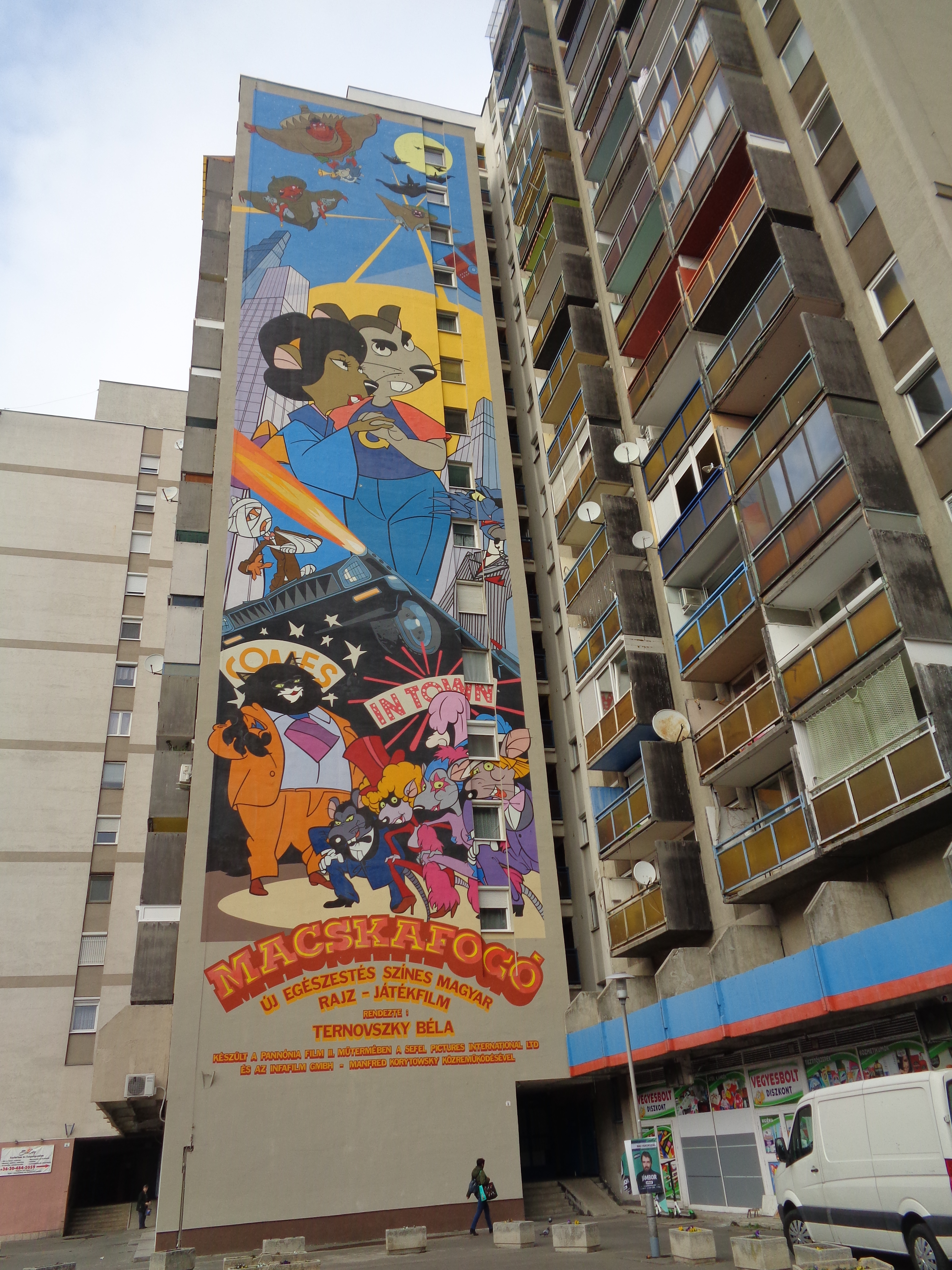
Building painted for Macskafogó (Cat City)

He graduated from Marxism-Leninism Evening University in 1964 after studying philosophy and aesthetics. He worked for Pannonia Film Studio and then the Hungarian Film Production Company before moving to Germany and working on a series there.

== Filmography ==
- Kérem a következőt ("Next, please!"), a series from Pannonia Film Studio
- Modern Sports Coaching (1970)

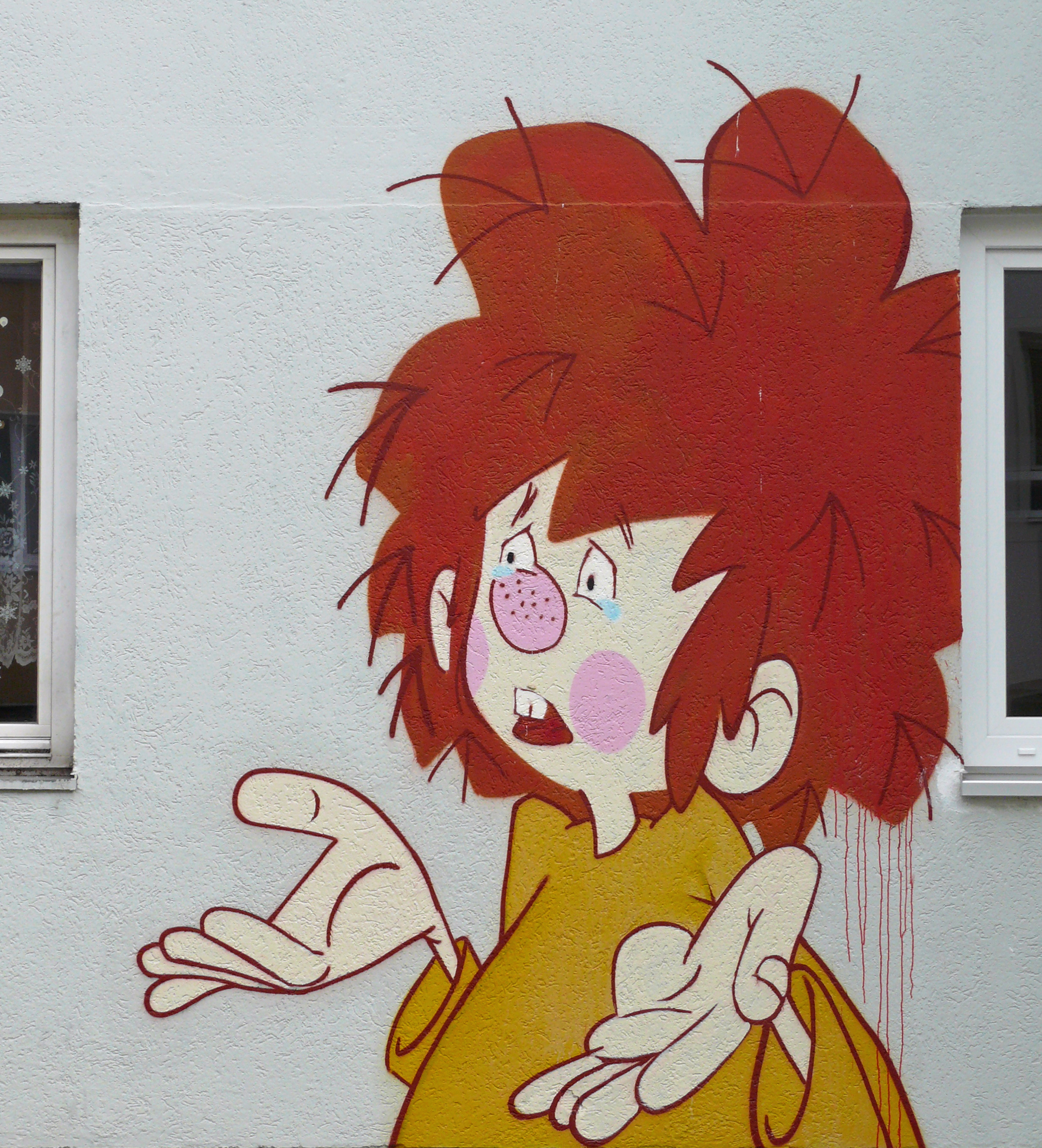
Mural of Pumuckl

- Where is the Limit? (1975)
- Cat City (1986), adult animated film
- Meister Eder und sein Pumuckl (TV series), Pumuckl character and animation
- Cat City 2: The Cat of Satan, 2 – A sátán macskája, (2007)

== See also ==
- Cinema of Hungary
- List of Hungarian films
- List of Hungarian submissions for the Academy Award for Best International Feature Film
