= For Your Files Only =

Mad TV comedy sketch from 1996

- Mad TV segment
- Claudia Schiffer as Jane Bond
- Episode no.: Season 1 Episode 17 (segment)
- Written by: Fax Bahr; Mary Scheer; Adam Small
- Original air date: April 6, 1996

Guest appearances
- Claudia Schiffer; Greg Kohout

"For Your Files Only" is a comedy sketch that aired on Mad TV during its first season on April 6, 1996. The sketch was presented as spoof of the James Bond franchise. The sketch featured supermodel Claudia Schiffer as Jane Bond, a spy who goes undercover as a temporary secretary. The sketch also features Mary Scheer as the villainous Doctor Boss (an amalgamation of Dr. Julius No and Ernst Stavro Blofeld), and Artie Lange as Doctor Boss' henchman Part-Time Job (an amalgamation of Oddjob and Jaws). The sketch is designed as a fictional film trailer from 20th Century Fox, centers on Schiffer as a new kind of secret agent. Instead of having a licence to kill, Jane Bond has a licence to collate.

== Synopsis ==
After an establishing shot of London, the scene shifts to a fireplace inside a bedroom, where a man (Rod Works) is romantically licking the bottom tip of a Jane Bond's black pump. Soon, the telephone rings and on the other line is Bond's superior (David Herman), who tells Bond that the secret service is in grave danger due to an accounting firm's plans for world domination. Bond is therefore, asked to infiltrate the firm's offices while posing as a secretary. Before Bond's superior hangs up, he tells her that Q has supplied her with a gift certificate that's good for £50 at Office Depot.

Following a gun barrel sequence, the scene cuts to the accounting firm's offices, where a now undercover Bond is greeted at her desk by Doctor Boss and her office manager Part-Time Job. Upon her own introduction, Bond dramatically removes the pin that was holding up her hair in a bun and shakes it out. Doctor Boss then tells Bond to dial #9 in order to get an outside line on her telephone, but also stresses to not make any long-distance calls. Boss finishes by telling Bond to not take anything accidental, or else she'll have to deal with Part-Time Job and the staple remover inside his metal teeth. After Boss and Part-Time Job leave, Bond reaches over to the electric pencil sharpener on her desk to sharpen her right index fingernail.

The scene then immediately shifts to the perception of a fish tank, where Bond is involved with a violent struggle at her desk with a large man in a scuba set. Bond manages to subdue the man by using a pencil to remove his breathing tube. Meanwhile, in Doctor Boss' office, she informs Part-Time Bond that she suspects that Bond is after their files that contains their plans to take over the world. Shortly thereafter, Bond is right in the middle of a massive shootout at her desk, where she's only armed with a rubber band and paper clips. Bond is soon captured by Doctor Boss and Part-Time Job, who has her tied to a watercolor that's filled with nitroglycerin. Before Boss leaves, she attempts to crack a few jokes regarding Bond's impending doom with Part-Time Job playing a rimshot while sitting at a drum kit.

Unbeknownst to Part-Time Job, Bond is carefully cutting the back of the ropes with her sharpened right index fingernail. Bond soon begins to distract Part-Time Job by seductively pleading with him to make her happy one more time. But just as Part-Time Job walks back to Bond under the assumption that she wants him to romantically satisfy her, Bond manages to break free from the ropes, grabs a bottle of Whack Out, and tosses it in front of Part-Time Job, subduing him. Soon, Doctor Boss returns and to her shock, finds Part-Time Job immobilized on the floor. Enraged, Boss pulls a gun out on Bond, only for Bond to casually grab a black stapler and stapling Boss to door. Afterwards, Bond breaks the fourth wall by saying that she likes her villains "stapled, not stirred".

In the closing credits for "For Your Files Only" (and a theme song reminiscent of "Goldfinger" by Shirley Bassey), Jane Bond is said to return in: "Octotempy", "The Man with the Golden Parachute", "On Her Majesty's Temporary Service", "You Only Temp Twice", "Temps Aren't Forever", "Moontemper", "Dr. No-Raise", "Thunder Ball-point", "The Spy Who Hired Me", "From Russia with Overtime", "The Living Day Jobs", "License to Type", and "Tempfinger".

== See also ==
- List of James Bond parodies and spin-offs
