= Miklós Benedek =

Hungarian actor and writer (1946–2024)

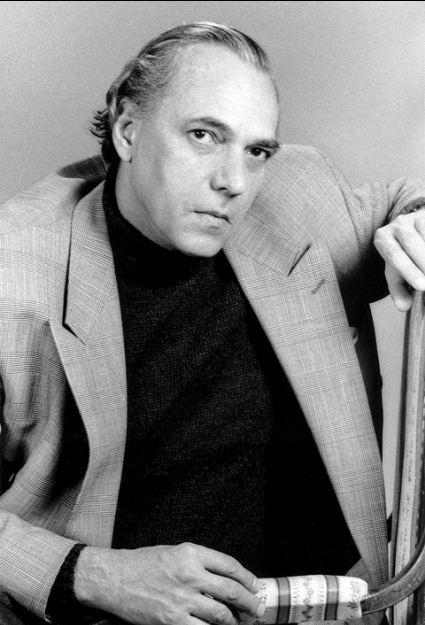
- Benedek in 1997
- Born: Miklós Benedek; 28 September 1946; Budapest, Hungary
- Died: 9 January 2024 (aged 77); Budapest, Hungary
- Occupations: Actor; writer
- Years active: 1968–2023
- Spouse: Éva Hodgyai (m. 1971)
- Children: Tibor Benedek, Albert Benedek

Miklós Benedek (28 September 1946 – 9 January 2024) was a Hungarian actor and writer. He is most noted for his role of Mr. Fritz Teufel in the 1986 movie Cat City.

== Early life ==
Miklós Benedek was born on 28 September 1946. His father, Tibor Benedek, was a Hungarian actor. Shortly after his parents divorced, Benedek moved in with his mother. His father committed suicide in 1963 when Miklós was in second grade. When Benedek reached high school, he studied in the Russian sector of ELTE Radnóti Miklós School. In 1965, Benedek, along with Péter Valcz and Tibor Dévényi, won the Hungarian Who Knows What? parody category award. Shortly after, in 1969, Benedek graduated from the Hungarian University of Theater and Film in Budapest, where he studied under director and screenwriter Miklós Szinetár.

== Career ==
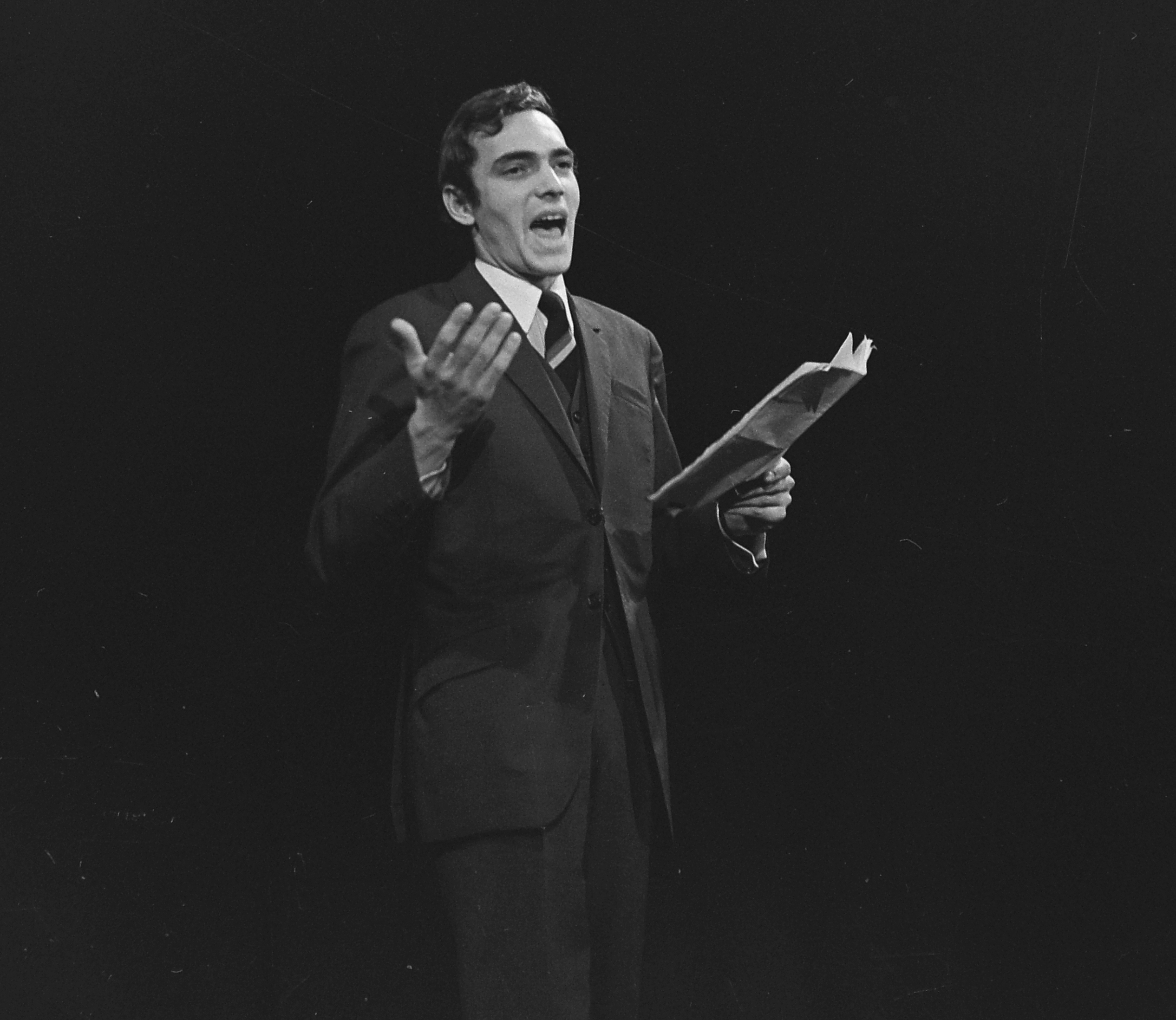
Benedek in 1972, acting in a play.

After graduating from university, Benedek signed a contract with the National Theatre, where he played for 14 years between 1969 and 1983. After he cut his contract with the National Theatre, he played for the Katona József Theater starting in 1983. In 1991—1992 and 1993–1996, Benedek was the administrator of the Hungarian Chamber of Actors and in 2003, he again had a contract with Katona József Theater. Between 1997 and 2007, he became a teacher at The University of Film and Arts, where he had previously studied. In 2003, Benedek began performing at the National Theater again. In 2009, he was fired along with six of his colleagues and started playing in shows around the world as a freelancer. In 2017, he was included in Tibor Orlai's Orlais Produkciós Irodá.

Benedek's character is often defined as having an ironic sense of humor. He was one of the singers in Hungaroton's album Budapesti Orfeum.

== Death ==
Benedek died on 9 January 2024, at the age of 77.

== Theater works ==
=== Plays ===
- Archangel Raphael in Imre Madách's The Tragedy of Man
- Doctor Lombardi in Carlo Goldoni's Servant of Two Masters
- Pretzels in Ernő Szép's May
- Poins in Shakespeare's Henry IV, Part 1 and Part 2
- The Doctor in Maurice Maeterlinck's The Miracle of St. Anthony
- Lentulus in George Bernard Shaw's Androcles and the Lion
- General Varravin in Aleksandr Sukhovo-Kobylin's The Death of Tarelkin
- Second Lawyer in Molière's Mr. Gömböc
- Pettersen in Henrik Ibsen's The Wild Duck
- King Bobéche in Jacques Offenbach's Bluebeard
- King Wenceslas in Alfred Jarry's Ubu Roi
- Knight Ripafratta in Carlo Goldoni's Mirandolina
- Cinzano in Schneider and Ondráček's Gentlemenek
- Montague in Shakespeare's Romeo and Juliet
- Christian in Magnier's Oszkár
- Jaques in Shakespeare's As You Like It
- Pósalaky in Zsigmond Móricz's Be Good Until Death
- Long in Dario Fo's Archangels Don't Play Pinball

=== Television movies ===
- Gimnazista in The Confrontation (1969)
- Medveczki in Svédcsavar (1975)
- Pszichiáter in Illetlenek (1977)
- Lord in Wrong-Doers (1979)
- Pszichológus in The Fortress (1979)
- Mr. P. Smith in The Pagan Madonna (1981)
- Mr. Fritz Teufel in Cat City (1986)
- Kolowrat in Miklós Akli (1986)
- Sipos in Illatszertár (1987)
- Andrej Andrejevics in Stalin's Bride (1991)
- Nagy Levin in Three Guardsmen in Africa (1996)
- Professor in Espresso (1998)
- Mr. Fritz Teufel in Cat City 2 (2007)
- Iván in S.O.S. Love! (2007)
