= Critical Assignment =

- Theatrical release poster
- Directed by: Dennis Gansel
- Screenplay by: Tunde Babalola; Celia Couchman; Bob Mahoney
- Produced by: Bob Mahoney
- Starring: Cleveland Mitchell; Moshidi Motshegwa; Terence Reis; Craig Gardner; Richard Mofe-Damijo
- Cinematography: Michael Alan Brierley
- Music by: Joe Campbell; Paul Hart
- Production companies: MPTM; Moonlighting Films
- Distributed by: ACI
- Release date: 2004
- Countries: United Kingdom; South Africa
- Language: English

Critical Assignment is a 2004 African action film directed by Jason Xenopoulos. It involves a journalist, Michael Power, who is going against a politician who is acquiring weapons and diverting water from the people.

Betty Onuh of the Nigerian magazine Newswatch stated "Essentially, it is a story "written and directed by Africans and for Africans."" Eric Frank, Saatchi & Saatchi Africa Network MD, described Critical Assignment as "the largest Pan-African marketing initiative ever undertaken by Guinness Africa and it underscores the transition of both Guinness and its action hero, Michael Power, to Lovemark status."

== Creation and filming ==
Guinness Nigeria Plc created and financed the film; the company did not reveal the budget. Bob Mahoney, a British man, served as the film's producer. It was filmed in Cameroon, Ghana, Kenya, Nigeria, and South Africa. South African Jason Xenopoulos directed the film and Nigerian Tunde Babalola wrote the screenplay.

The film had a budget that was unusually large for a sub-Saharan African film. According to Jo Foster of the BBC, "As an action movie Critical Assignment is not terribly original. But as an African action movie it is rather unique."

According to the producers, the goal was entertainment and there were no plans to show realism. Mahoney stated "We made a conscious effort at points in the script to get back out there and show Africa".

According to Guinness Nigeria corporate department director Tunde Savage, the film was made to promote universal access to clean water and not for profit reasons.

== Cast ==
- Cleveland Mitchell as Michael Power
- Omanza Shaw as Harry Mogaji
  - Harry, who wants to improve his village, is Michael Power's ally and friend. Shaw is Ghanaian actor who played a stowaway in the 1996 film Deadly Voyage.
- Moshidi Motshegwa as Anita
  - Anita was the second feature film role that Motshegwa played. She was 26 years old at the time of filming. Motshegwa is from South Africa.
- Thami Ngubeni as Sabina
  - Ngubeni, a South African, was 26 years old at the time of filming.
- Louise Barnes as Laura

Other actors included Nigerians Buki Ajayi and Richard Mofe-Damijo.

== Reception ==
According to Foster the film felt "at times,[...]like a promotional film for the African tourist board", without poverty and blight that were common in sub-Saharan Africa. She stated that an audience in Cameroon had a positive reception to the film because it showed Cameroonian landmarks.

Tempo stated that "Overall, it is a good starting point for Guinness in its effort to contribute its quota in building the film industry in Nigeria." The paper stated that "Lovely as the intentions behind the production of this movie might be, it lacks much of its Pan African toga" since the clothing featured in the film was not African and that "From the 3-minutes clip which was shown to select journalists, it is obvious that the movie lacks the African stuff which it intends to promote."
