= Tamás Deák (composer) =

Hungarian composer and conductor (1928–2024)

Tamás Deák Deák Tamás
- Born: Tamás Deák; 27 April 1928; Székesfehérvár, Hungary
- Died: 12 February 2024 (aged 95); Budapest, Hungary
- Occupations: Composer, conductor, musician

Tamás Deák (27 April 1928 – 12 February 2024) was a Hungarian composer and conductor.

== Biography ==
To the greatest extent, he was engaged in jazz music, played the trumpet, and from 1964, he led the Deak big band. He was one of the pioneers of jazz music education in Hungary. Beginning in 1969 he was the head of the jazz class of the Béla Bartók Music School in Budapest.

On the territory of the USSR and the CIS, he was known as the author of the instrumental composition "Water Ski" (Hungarian: Vízisí) (1968), which was used in the opening credits of the animated series Nu, pogodi! (a number of his other compositions are also used in this animated series), as well as music for the animated series Gustav (1964–1977) and the animated film Cat City (1986).

Deák died on 12 February 2024, at the age of 95.
