= List of Hungarian films =

This is a list collecting the most notable films produced in Hungary and in the Hungarian language.

The list is divided into three major political-historical eras.

For an alphabetical list of articles on Hungarian films see Category:Hungarian films.

== 1901-1947 ==
This list includes notable Hungarian films produced during the periods of the Austro-Hungarian Monarchy, the Kingdom of Hungary, and the Second Hungarian Republic.

== 1948-1989 ==
This list includes notable Hungarian films produced during the Communist period of Hungary, under the People's Republic of Hungary.

== Since 1990 ==
This list includes notable Hungarian films produced after the change of regime in 1989.
