= Magnier =

Magnier is a surname. Notable people with the surname include:

- Cyrille Magnier (born 1969), French footballer
- Dave Magnier (1916–1979), Irish Gaelic footballer
- John Magnier (born 1948), Irish businessman
- Lise Magnier (born 1984), French politician
- Paul Magnier (born 2004), French cyclist
- Philippe Magnier (1647–1715), French sculptor
- Pierre Magnier (1869–1959), French actor

== See also ==
- Magnier Peaks, mountains of Antarctica
- Magnier Peninsula, peninsula of Antarctica
