= Mad TV season 1 =

Season of television series

Mad TV
- Season 1
- DVD cover
- No. of episodes: 19

Release
- Original network: Fox
- Original release: October 14, 1995 – June 22, 1996

Season chronology
- Next → Season 2

Mad TV was an American sketch comedy series, Season 1 originally aired in the United States on the Fox Network between October 1995, and June 1996.

Mad TV's first season premiered in the 1995 television season, on October 14 at 11:00 pm, thirty minutes before the time-slot of its rival, Saturday Night Live.

The original Mad TV repertory cast members were Bryan Callen, David Herman, Orlando Jones, Phil LaMarr, Artie Lange, Mary Scheer, Nicole Sullivan, and Debra Wilson, with Craig Anton as a featured player. The first season's cast was a mixture of seasoned television and film veterans like LaMarr, Herman, and Scheer, and relatively unknown newcomers like Callen, Jones, Lange, Sullivan, and Wilson.

Season one of Mad TV relied heavily on the fan base of MAD Magazine. Each episode featured the use of the MAD logo (which is still used today), Alfred E. Neuman images and puns, the Spy vs. Spy cartoons, and the catchphrase "What...me worry?" The first season also established some of the series' landmark characters like Jaq the UBS Guy (LaMarr), The Vancome Lady (Sullivan), Mrs. Jewel Barone (Scheer) and Momma (Lange) from That's My White Momma. This season also produced several enduring celebrity parodies like Oprah Winfrey (Wilson), Tom Hanks (Herman) in Gump Fiction and Dennis Rodman (Jones) making a public service announcement.

Unlike Saturday Night Live, Mad TV had no celebrity hosts during its first season. However, the show did have special guests including Kato Kaelin, Joe Walsh and Dean Stockwell, Peter Marshall, Michael Buffer, Adam West, Gary Coleman, Jamie Farr, Ken Norton, Jr, David Faustino, Claudia Schiffer, Kim Coles, Bruce McCulloch, Tony Orlando, and Harland Williams. Musical groups such as Poison and Pharcyde also made appearances on the show.

The initial Mad TV cast was very young and with the exceptions of Debra Wilson and Mary Scheer (who were 33 and 32 respectively at the time), were all under the age of 30. By contrast, Saturday Night Live, then in its 21st season, only had three cast members under the age of 30 (Will Ferrell, Chris Kattan, and Jim Breuer).

== Opening montage ==
The title sequence begins with several fingers pointing at a bomb. The bomb explodes and several different pictures of Alfred E. Neuman appear on the screen, followed by the Mad TV logo. The theme song, performed by the hip-hop group Heavy D & the Boyz, begins. Cast members are introduced alphabetically with their names appearing in caption over live-action clips of each performer. More pictures of Alfred E. Neuman appear between the introduction of each cast member. When the last cast member is introduced, the music stops and the title sequence ends with the phrase "You are now watching Mad TV."

== Cast ==
Repertory cast members

- Bryan Callen (19/19 episodes)
- David Herman (19/19 episodes)
- Orlando Jones (19/19 episodes)
- Phil LaMarr (19/19 episodes)
- Artie Lange (15/19 episodes)
- Mary Scheer (19/19 episodes)
- Nicole Sullivan (19/19 episodes)
- Debra Wilson (19/19 episodes)

Featured cast members

- Craig Anton (1/19 episodes)

== Writers ==
- Jonathan Aibel (eps. 1, 3, 4, 6)
- Fax Bahr (eps. 1–19)
- Sean Beam (eps. 1, 8)
- Glenn Berger (eps. 1, 3, 4, 6)
- Blaine Capatch (eps. 1–19)
- Rob Cohen (eps. 1, 3, 8)
- Leonard Dick (eps. 2–13)
- Brian Frazer (eps. 2–13)
- Spencer Green (eps. 1–19)
- Dave Hanson (eps. 2–19)
- Brian Hartt (eps. 2–9) (writing supervisor, 10–19)
- Jordan Hawley (eps. 2–13)
- David Herman (ep. 7)
- Steve Hibbert (eps. 2–13, 15)
- Orlando Jones (eps. 2–15)
- Dawna Kaufmann (eps. 15–19)
- Arnie Kogen (creative consultant) (eps. 13–19)
- Phil LaMarr (ep. 2)
- Artie Lange (ep. 2)
- Steve Lookner (eps. 1–10)
- Patton Oswalt (eps. 1–19)
- Mary Scheer (ep. 7)
- Michael Short (creative consultant) (eps. 15–19)
- Paul Slansky (eps. 1, 6)
- Adam Small (eps. 1–19)
- Nicole Sullivan (ep. 4)
- Skip Warburg (eps. 12, 13)
- Mary Elizabeth Williams (eps. 1–19)
- Eric Zicklin (eps. 15–19)

== Episodes ==
No. overall	No. in season	Guest(s)	Original release date
1	1	Kato Kaelin and Poison	October 14, 1995
Fox executives search the streets of L.A. for cast members in a new sketch comedy show, which just happens to be Mad TV; two faux commercials for a beer known as Vudweiser are shown, the first with Vud sticking himself to the truck door by accident, the other with his two frog friends trying to warn him that the truck will crush him, which it does; The Vancome Lady (Nicole Sullivan) mistreats store customers; Ice-T (Phil LaMarr) and Ice Cube (Orlando Jones) perform a rap titled It Ain't Easy Being Me with a music video filmed in jail after being placed under arrest; a Fox News at Midnight anchor (David Herman) presents a 911 call to the Vancome Lady gone wrong; Spy vs. Spy: Bombing/Pogo Stick; Don Martin: Inflatable House/Last Chance Gas; Alfred E. Tarantino presents a trailer showing Forrest Gump done in the style of Pulp Fiction; Spike Lee (Phil LaMarr) makes a tinned deviled ham commercial; MTV Week With Poison; Kato Kaelin speaks his truth; chain smoker Mrs. Jewel Barone (Mary Scheer) spends time with her daughter (Nicole Sullivan) at the hospital during treatment; a new restaurant called MacDumpster's where customers literally dig in the garbage for their breakfast food; in Star Trek: Deep Stain Nine, the crew aboard the Enterprise battles such evils as a red sock in a load of white clothing.
2	2	Kato Kaelin, Joe Walsh and Dean Stockwell	October 21, 1995
P.C. Cops; Nicole Sullivan's bedroom secrets; Quantum Dream Team; a commercial for Power Book, the ultimate in interactive computers; Don Martin: Refrigerator Anesthesia/Chopped Frog Prince; Newt Gingrich (Artie Lange) presents the Habitat 2000 virtual reality helmet; The UBS Delivery Guy (Phil LaMarr) tries to hit on a businesswoman; Spy vs. Spy: Gorilla/3D Movies; Whoopi Goldberg (Debra Wilson) and Shirley MacLaine (Mary Scheer) in Crimson Tide II; Post Office gun regulation; Family that recently moved dislikes the unusual neighbors; The Pro Air Guitar Shop; Nicole Sullivan's Diary.
3	3	Peter Marshall	October 28, 1995
Mom (Mary Scheer) with a phone sex line talks with her son (Bryan Callen); Mary Scheer's A.D.D.; NDI versus AE&E, phone service bills; Lenny (Artie Lange) and Lumpken (David Herman), the Outing Dummy; Psychic Cop (Mary Scheer); Spy vs. Spy: Microbomb; the story of an overprotective mother (Nicole Sullivan) and her teenage daughter (Mary Scheer) going at it; Racism vs Spam; Peter Marshall hosts a new syndicated game show called First to a Million which proves to take so long to progress points for correct answers one by one contestants complain; Don Martin: Couple/Inflatable Lifesaver; Apollo the 13th: Jason Takes Nasa; Mulatto Entertainment Association; Cookin' with Sherry (Mary Scheer); Circus guy; in Homeland Improvement, Tim McAllen (Herman) and Al (Lange) show Militia Time audience members how to protect their home from government attacks; The Rolling Stones' "Like a Rolling Stone" video clip.
4	4	Michael Buffer, Adam West and Gary Coleman	November 4, 1995
Boxing announcer Michael Buffer stars as himself in the new FOX sitcom, Life with Buffer; Cast supporting Mike Tyson and/or Buster Mathis Jr.; Highagain beer; Boxing Corner; E.R. parody features has-been celebrities trying to revive their careers: P.R. Public Relations; Spy vs. Spy: Umbrella/Down the Drain; The Vancome Lady (Nicole Sullivan) mistreats the patients at the hospital; Lying; Woody Allen (David Herman) Action Flick: Crimes, Misdemeanors and Payback; Sex Therapist; Dennis Rodman (Orlando Jones) recommends white people to stay away from the NBA; Family Feed; Republican Gladiators; Don Martin: Fishing; Drug Abuse; Other White Meat.
5	5	TBA	November 11, 1995
Phone Conference Call; IZM CompuPad; A Hare Krishna breaks up with his band at the airport and goes solo; Lowered Expectations; Urine; Affirmative Crips; Got Urine?; Don Martin: Beach hunk; Larry King (David Herman) Gone Mad; Billy Crystal (Phil LaMarr) struggles having a platonic friendship with a whale in romantic comedy: When Harry Met Willy; Midnight Golfer; A man (Bryan Callen) in death row brakes up with his girlfriend; Celibacy; Couple that just broke up calling their best friend in very near phone booths; Backstage Cats; Spy vs. Spy: Beach Girl.
6	6	Neve Campbell, Jamie Farr, Matthew Fox, Dana Gould, Scott Wolf	November 18, 1995
QVC Fine China Hour: O.J. Plates; When We Knew...; Calvin Klein; Stop Smoking; Oprah Winfrey (Debra Wilson) Severe Traumas; Swimming Pool; Vague; Clueless of the Lambs; A mad moment from Dana Gould; Don Martin: Harp Fall; Movie trailer referencing many other movies; Nicole Sullivan in Party of Five; Spy vs. Spy: Slinky/Sun Rays; Debbie Dander (Mary Scheer) Seminar Training.
7	7	Billy Barty, Dave Foley, Ken Norton, Jr.	November 25, 1995
Lowered Expectations; Ken Norton Jr. encourages the cast; Vud Light; Disruptive Principal (David Herman); Navajo Football League; Don Martin: Water Skiing/Fat freak wife; Mike Tyson vs Billy Barty; Steven Seagal (Bryan Callen) in Hard to Oppress: Dark Territory 2; Spy vs. Spy: Crane Machine/Torpedo; The Happy Happy Storytime Lady; Mary Scheer's Tapeworm; Math Made Easy; Dave Foley speaks about Canada; Phil LaMarr and his imaginative friends; Duck... Goose.
8	8	Quincy Jones, LL Cool J, RuPaul	December 9, 1995
Sweatin' to the O.G.'s; Phil LaMarr, the lottery loser; Daytime Jane (Mary Scheer); L.L.Cool J., news shows vs. talk shows; Octoroon (Bryan Callen); Don Martin: Surgery/Castaways; Gump Fiction; Scat Chat; Spy vs. Spy: Prison Escape/Dream Sounds; The UBS Delivery Guy (Phil LaMarr) gets promoted; Ejaculation; Fabulous; Monkey Woman.
9	9	Pauly Shore	December 16, 1995
Easy to Assemble; Jesus's Birthday; Wonder Rake 5000; The Vancome Lady (Nicole Sullivan): Department Store Santa; Fruitcake vs. Santa; Spy vs. Spy: Toilet Plunger/Tank Bomb; Raging Rudolph; College Advisor; The Christmas Santa Forgot; The Bank; Pauly Shore talks about a past Christmas; Donut Shop; Clops; Happy Go Lucky Phil LaMarr; Mrs. Barone at a bar.
10	10	Andy Kindler, Rip Taylor	January 6, 1996
Stress Management; Bill Clinton (David Herman) makes a US Commercial; Clintfeld; Knowledge; Spy vs. Spy: Spaghetti Door/Training Fleas; Handicapped Toilet Police; The Go-Between; Get Smarty; Improv; Don Martin: Brick Layers/Cake Machine; Mafia Management; Andy Kindler complains on TV entertainment; Line of Duty; Emotional Prostitute; Mime Psychiatrist (Phil LaMarr). Absent: Artie Lange
11	11	Tony Orlando, The Presidents of the United States of America (Musical Guest)	January 13, 1996
Political party commercial; The Presidents of the United States of America Commercial; Lounge Lawyer; Spy vs. Spy: Macaroni/Lab Fly; Office Window; Don Martin: Civil War/Bear Hunt; Window of the Soul; I Could Do That; The Presidents of the United States of America perform "Lump"; Time Manager; Coffee and Dana; Take a Letter; Rock, Paper, Scissors; Mad About Jew. Absent: Artie Lange
12	12	David Faustino, Pharcyde	February 3, 1996
Cotton Swabs; Heart Pops; Martin Luther King Jr. (Phil LaMarr) struggles to prepare his speech in a parody of Martin; Spy vs. Spy: Magnet/Typewriter; Poetry class; Rap group Pharcyde and David Faustino star in a spoof of The Three Stooges against a backdrop of urban violence; Don Martin: Tennis; The Linder family auditions to appear on an episode of Rescue 911, but the parents (David Herman, Mary Scheer) frequently embarrass their son Mark (Bryan Callen); A loudmouth (David Herman) tells a story to his friends, then tells everyone else to stop looking at him; A psychiatrist (Nicole Sullivan) doesn't make her patient (Mary Scheer) feel any better when she discusses her relationship troubles; While looking for a target to take out, a hitman (David Herman) tries to think of the song that plays in his head; Needy Guy; Instant Personality; Woman dog. Absent: Artie Lange
13	13	TBA	February 10, 1996
Lowered Expectations; Vista Militia; Dr. Goodwrench (Bryan Callen); Spy vs. Spy: Falling Rocks; Memory Wizard (Bryan Callen); The XXX Files; Your Cheatin' Head; Don Martin: Chemistry Set; Jim Carrey (Bryan Callen) School of Acting; The Vancome Lady (Nicole Sullivan) Hostage Negotiator; Sick of It; That's How They Get You; Quality Time; Foreign Psychiatrist. Absent: Artie Lange
14	14	Whoopi Goldberg, Brian Austin Green	February 17, 1996
News reporters remain callously umsympathetic while reporting on dangerous events; Michael Jackson (Phil LaMarr) promotes a seminar tape on how to be famous; Two wannabe gangstas (David Herman, Nicole Sullivan) rethink their ways when they are introduced to White Chocolate (Brian Austin Green); A woman (Mary Scheer) is rude to everyone on an airplane; Spy vs. Spy: Hair Dryer; A parody of Davey & Goliath has Davey forced by his dog Goliath to dish out harsh discipline to sinners with a gun; A discussion about Casino erupts into a fight; A man (Artie Lange) suffers from a disease that makes him act like a sports fanatic; A coffee addict (Bryan Callen) doesn't understand that his girlfriend (Nicole Sullivan) wants to break up with him. Don Martin: Beach Ball Boy/Tee Pee Guy; Two cops (David Herman, Artie Lange) try different tactics to get one of their suspects (Orlando Jones) to confess to a crime; A fan who looks like Whoopi Goldberg accosts the actress/comedian backstage; UBS Delivery Guy (Phil LaMarr) Wake; Odds and Evens: The Movie; Disruptive Waitress (Nicole Sullivan).
15	15	Dave Higgins, Doug Llewelyn	March 9, 1996
Spishak Products; Ink Blot; A player (Phil LaMarr) claims to be too good to be a bachelor on Lowered Expectations; That's My White Mama (Artie Lange); Roseanne Barr (Artie Lange), Drew Barrymore (Nicole Sullivan), Whitney Houston (Debra Wilson), and Barbra Streisand (Mary Scheer) star in Terms of Imprisonment; Spy vs. Spy: Dream Tank/Bomb Assembly; Small Claims Court; Eddie Murphy (Orlando Jones) tries to convince director Spike Lee (Phil LaMarr) to work with him; Dave Higgins talks about alcohol; Russian Landlords; Don Martin: Assembly Line.
16	16	Chris Hardwick, Barry Williams	March 16, 1996
X-News; International Coffee; Ozark Mountain Single Out; Bob Dole (David Herman) Commercial; In a parody of Casino and Encino Man, Nicky Santarone (Artie Lange) helps Dave (Bryan Callen) and Stony (David Herman) become big shots at their school: Encino Man 2, Casino Man; Doctor's Visit; Insanely Disappointed; In the latest installment of X-News Marsh's roommate (Bryan Callen) takes over while the two newscasters (David Herman, Nicole Sullivan) deal with their own problems; Survival Weekend; Spy vs. Spy: Basketball; The Big Game.
17	17	Claudia Schiffer and Kim Coles	April 6, 1996
Artie Lange introduces the cast in announcer fashion; An interview with O. J. Simpson (Orlando Jones) contains outrageous bloopers; Parody of Levi's commercials; Mrs. Curtis (Artie Lange) catches her daughter (Debra Wilson) smoking cigarettes on That's My White Mama; A news reporter (Mary Scheer) repeats nearly verbatim everything her colleagues say; Parody of Lethal Weapon where Murtaugh (Orlando Jones) works with a new partner, Montell Jordan (Phil LaMarr): Lethal Weapon 4, Lethal Talkin'; Claudia Schiffer stars in a parody of James Bond films: Jane Bond, For Your Files Only; Spy vs. Spy: Brain Swap; Two home girls (Kim Coles, Debra Wilson) work as surgeons; A gangster (Artie Lange) poses as a businessman who sells stolen products, then harasses his partner (Bryan Callen); The high school's valedictorian (Nicole Sullivan) makes reference to grim, historic events during graduation.
18	18	Bruce McCulloch	May 25, 1996
X-News; Mary Scheer introduces the cast as soap opera actors; Headache; Unsolved Events: Beauty Pageant; The New Nut Job; Spy vs. Spy: Projector/Fallen in Love/Safe Trick; Babe-Watch; Drug Bust; Bruce McCulloch on different subjects; a DJ from radio station KRAC, the Crack remembers a deceased fellow co-worker in his usual excitable fashion and references classic rock songs.
19	19	Harland Williams (special guest)	June 22, 1996
Two clueless martial artists (Bryan Callen, Artie Lange) have a sparring match; The fictitious Spishak Company promotes its margarine; Two parents (Artie Lange, Mary Scheer) are oblivious that their daughter (Nicole Sullivan) is a lesbian, and that her "friend" (Debra Wilson) is her lover; Lowered Expectations bachelors include one who's very uptight (David Herman), one with a special talent (Orlando Jones), and one who's looking for a spiritual relationship (Debra Wilson); A fugitive with missing limbs is on the loose, but several cops are able to find the body parts and other pieces of evidence; Spy vs. Spy: Briefcase; Kids have their slumber party ruined by the host's father (David Herman); A claymation parody of Gumby involves the curious clay figure looking through a Playboy-like magazine: Gumboy; A scamming little league bookie (Artie Lange) strikes up deals with children; Harland Williams and the secrets of America; Two employees (Mary Scheer, Nicole Sullivan) settle their rivalry by threatening to kick each other's asses; Two goofy performers (David Herman, Mary Scheer) look to get their big break.

== Home releases ==
All 19 episodes from season one were released on DVD on September 21, 2004, in a boxed set entitled Mad TV: The Complete First Season. The audio track included on this release was a Dolby Digital 2.0 Surround mix. Extra features included the 200th episode of Mad TV (from season nine), the best of Mad TV's commercial, movie, television, music video and animation parodies, a reel of season one bloopers, nine unaired sketches (including one called "Schindler's Lost", which was banned for censorship reasons and mentioned on the season 13 clip show episode "Mad TV Ruined My Life"), and a preview of Mad TV: The Complete Second Season.

Despite promises from FOX of a second season DVD release (and a preview of Mad TV's second season on the season one DVD), the Complete First Season DVD remained the only complete season of the show to be released on DVD for almost a decade. In 2012, Shout! Factory picked up the home video rights to Mad TV and released the second season on March 26, 2013. Seasons 3 and 4 were released later in 2013. As of this writing, seasons five to 15 are not available on DVD release, though sketches from seasons 8, 9, and 10 are part of a "Best Of" DVD compilation.

The HBO Max/Howdy release omitted episodes 2, 3, and 18. Tubi also released season one without episodes 2, 3, and 18, and have two "best of" clip shows ("The Best of Season One" and "MADtv Goes to the Movies") as the last two episodes of the season.
