= Cleveland Mitchell =

British actor

Cleveland Mitchell was a Jamaican-born, British actor. He portrayed the character of Michael Power in a marketing campaign of the same name by Guinness. He also starred in Critical Assignment in 2004. He died on April 15, 2010.

== Filmography ==
Year	Title	Role	Notes
2007	Flood	Armed Policeman	with Robert Carlyle, Jessalyn Gilsig, Tom Courtenay
2004	Critical Assignment	Michael Power	with Richard Mofe-Damijo, Bukky Ajayi
1997	One Night Stand	Armani Model	with Wesley Snipes, Nastassja Kinski
