= Cat City =

1986 film directed by Béla Ternovszky

- Hungarian theatrical release poster
- Directed by: Béla Ternovszky
- Written by: József Nepp
- Produced by: Román Kunz
- Starring: László Sinkó; Miklós Benedek; Péter Haumann
- Cinematography: Mária Neményi; Csaba Nagy; György Varga
- Edited by: Magda Hap
- Music by: Tamás Deák; Jimmy Giuffre
- Distributed by: Mokép
- Release date: 2 October 1986
- Running time: 94 minutes
- Countries: Canada; Hungary; West Germany
- Language: Hungarian

Cat City (Hungarian: Macskafogó; transl. Cat Catcher) is a 1986 Hungarian adult animated science fiction comedy film, directed by Béla Ternovszky and written by József Nepp. The title Cat City was used in the United States distribution. The film was selected as the Hungarian entry for the Best Foreign Language Film at the 59th Academy Awards, but it was not nominated.

The film is a parody of several famous feature films, mainly the James Bond series. It tells the story of a special agent who is sent to the city of "Pokyo" to obtain the secret plans of a machine that could save mouse society. The cats, not wanting this to happen, send four rat gangsters to stop this special agent, but they never end up proving as efficient as they initially seem. The film has developed a cult following in the years since its release. A musical based on the film premiered in December 2011.

== Movie Plot ==
In the year 80 AMM (After Mickey Mouse), the mice of Planet X are threatened by humiliation and apocalypse. The organized, equipped cats are aiming for the elimination of mice, disregarding the conventions between mice and cats. When the mouse leaders consider leaving the planet, a new hope rises...

== Cast ==
Character	Original	English
Nick Grabowski	László Sinkó	Rob Roy (Gary Gumshoe)
Mr. Fritz Teufel	Miklós Benedek	Dean Hagopian (Mr. D (Donald Diablo))
Safranek	Péter Haumann	A.J. Henderson (Tweed)
Mr. Giovanni Gatto	János Körmendi	Vlasta Vrána
Buddy	András Kern	Pierre Lenoir (Burns)
Billy	Gyula Szombathy	Michael Rudder (Bones)
Pissy	Ilona Béres	Maria Bircher (Candy)
Cookie	Zsuzsa Pálos	Carla Napier
Lazy Dick	István Mikó	Richard M. Dumont (Billy Bugle)
Mr. Bob Poljakoff	Ferenc Kállai	Walter Massey (Professor)
Edlington	Károly Mécs	Unknown (Captain)
Chino San	Vera Pap	Carla Napier (Seno-San)
Professor Fushimishi	István Szatmári	Unknown
Nero von Schwartz	Gyula Buss	Rob Roy (Nero "Blackie" Schwarz)
Maxipocak	Gyula Bodrogi	Rob Roy (Pancho Muncho)
Pedro	Gyula Horváth	Arthur Grosser

=== Additional Voices ===
- Marc Denis
- Kathleen Fee − Parrot
- Ian Finlay
- Mark Hellman
- Jack Langedijk
- Ron Lea
- Liz MacRae − Stewardess
- George Morris
- Dave Patrick
- Howard Ryshpan

== Reception ==
Gabriella Székely of Filmvilág gave a mixed review, calling it a "stereotype Gangster film which ends with a happy ending."

== Home media ==
Deaf Crocodile Films announced a Blu-ray release of the film in 2023, the first time ever in the United States. The release is based on a restoration by National Film Institute Hungary.

== In other media ==
A comic book adaptation, illustrated by József Nepp, Béla Ternovszky, and Zoltán Maros was released in 1987.

A musical based on the film, adapted by Róbert Szikora and Attila Valla, premiered in December 2011.

== Sequel: Catcher: Cat City 2 ==
Production of the sequel Catcher: Cat City 2 (Hungarian: Macskafogó 2 – A sátán macskája) started in September 2005. It was made on a budget of about 600 million HUF.

The story of Cat City 2 centers around an investigative journalist named Stanley Mouse, who wants to find out about the legend of an ancient "cat tribe" lost in Africa. He finds them and much more, once again threatening the continued existence of mouse civilization. Special Agent Grabowsky will act to save the day, however. The events are supposed to take place some 20 years after the first episode, as one of the already leaked cells shows the titular Cat-Catcher mecha rusting away in a shelter, and a grown-up child of some character appears in the plot.

Premiering on December 20, 2007, by January 2008 it had made the Hungarian Box Office Top Ten for 6 consecutive weeks. It was the most watched Hungarian film in 2008.

== See also ==
- List of submissions to the 59th Academy Awards for Best Foreign Language Film
- List of Hungarian submissions for the Academy Award for Best Foreign Language Film

Preceded by -	Animated films submission to Best Foreign Language Film category, Academy Awards (U.S.); 1986	Succeeded by Pom Poko (1994)
