= László Sinkó =

Hungarian actor

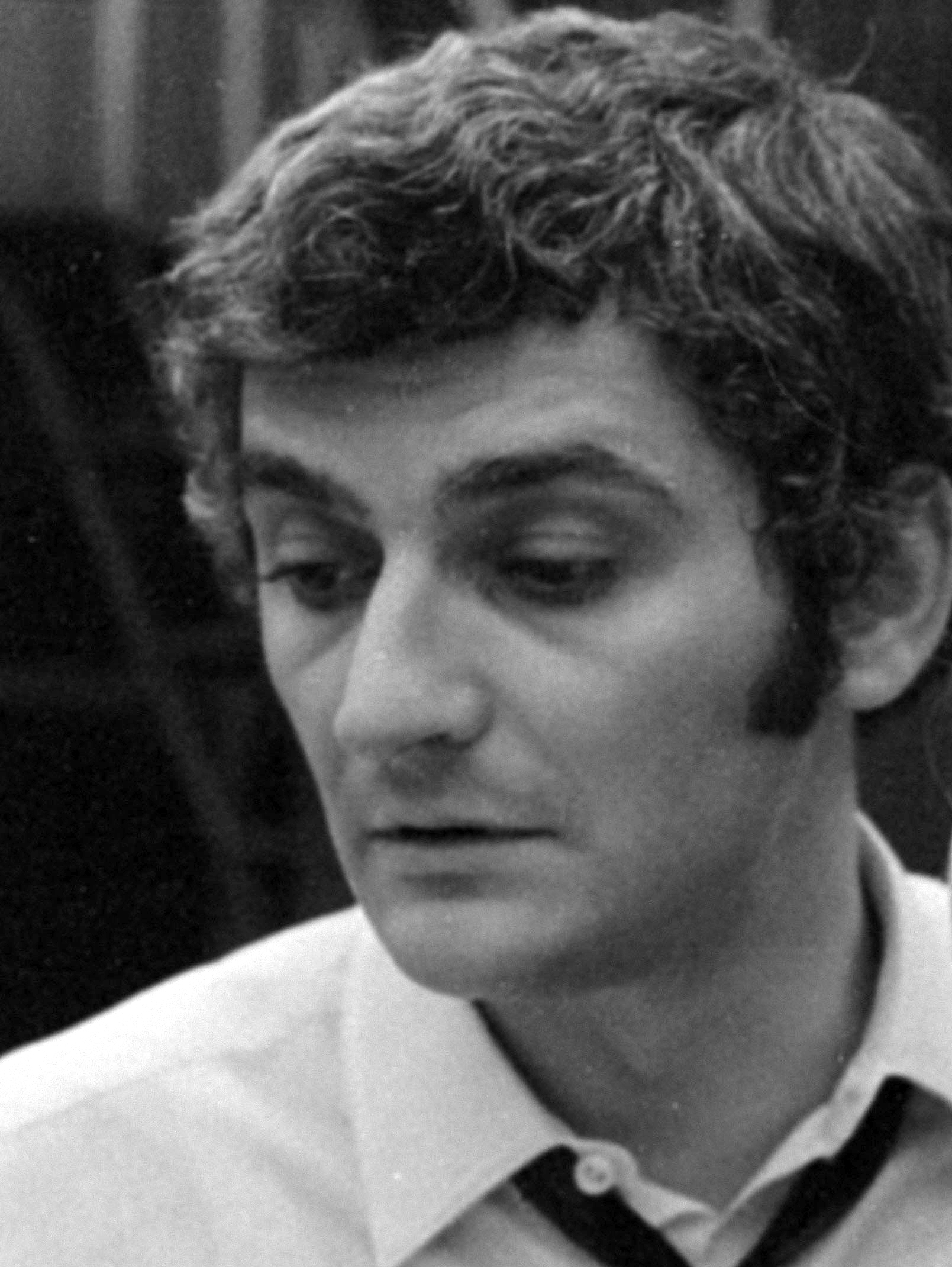
- László Sinkó in 1970.
- Born: 18 March 1940; Budapest, Hungary
- Died: 31 July 2015 (aged 75); Budapest, Hungary
- Occupation: Actor
- Years active: 1959-2009

László Sinkó (18 March 1940 – 31 July 2015) was a Hungarian actor. He appeared in more than 90 films and television shows between 1959 and 2009.

== Selected filmography ==
- Cat City (1986)
- The Conquest (1996)
- 1 (2009)
