= Michael Power (character) =

Advertising character

Michael Power in Critical Assignment, 2003

Michael Power is an advertising character (played by Cleveland Mitchell), the cornerstone of a large marketing campaign by the beer company Guinness to promote its products in Africa from 1999 to 2006. By 2003, it became one of the best-known alcohol advertising campaigns in Africa. Jo Foster of the BBC referred to Power as "Africa's very own 'James Bond'".

== Creation ==
In 1999, the marketing firm Saatchi & Saatchi Worldwide was trying to turn Guinness in Africa into what they call a "Lovemark", what they describe as a brand that enjoys "loyalty beyond reason" from consumers. The African market for Guinness at the time was faltering. Saatchi & Saatchi's goal was thus to advertise Guinness to the diverse populations across the continent and to double Guinness sales by 2005. In the words of African Managing Director Eric Frank, "... we had to find what we called the Simple, Universal, Relevant Truth that would persuade a continent to adore Guinness. We expressed it this way: Inside me there's a powerful, heroic, assured person. I want to live my life as that person. When I drink Guinness I become more fully who I am." Celia Couchman, African Marketing Director at the time, provided the answer: an African answer to James Bond with no particulars such as his age or nationality to relegate him to any particular ethnic group or region. Michael Power was born, the brainchild of Steven Shore, who worked at Saatchi & Saatchi in Cape Town. Throughout the entire seven-year campaign, Shore wrote and helped direct the Michael Power series, for both radio and television.

== Michael Power campaign ==
Instead of having Power deliver a straightforward sales pitch, Saatchi & Saatchi starred him as the hero of a series of mini-adventures on radio and television. The adverts, averaging three to five minutes in length, place Power in various action scenarios, where his resourcefulness and virility allow him to escape from danger or rescue the damsel in distress. Beginning in 2002, other adverts have featured the character in more domestic scenarios, such as attending a surprise party or guiding taxi cabs to illuminate a street festival with their headlights. His catchphrase, "Guinness brings out the power in you!" thus casts the beer in the same positive light as the strong, virile, triumphant hero.

The films were popular with African television stations, who aired them as free programming. Power and the campaign that surrounded him are also notable because the advertisements were shot on location in Africa using African actors and crews. Mitchell himself commented (as Power), "We are focusing on stories that bring the true strength of Africa. We want to highlight the way we live, the way we talk, the way we play and the way we do everything that makes us unique as Africans."

The campaign worked. Guinness led the African beer market by 50% in 2000. Brand recognition reached a reported 95%, and volume growth rose up to 50% in some markets. Guinness sales doubled by 2003, two years ahead of schedule. Power's face became one of the most recognisable in Africa, as it adorned billboards, cardboard standees, posters, and television advertisements in African countries where Guinness is sold. Mitchell, dressed all in black, made numerous personal appearances as Power each year, visiting television and radio stations, newspapers, and Guinness breweries and distributors. His fame was such that his appearances received extensive news coverage, and many news services did not realize that he was merely a fictional character. Many Africans speculated about Power's country and village of origin. Mitchell, as Powers, answered questions with slogan-like ambiguity: "Nigerians should always believe in themselves . . . . They should hang in there and always believe that our best days are always ahead of us. Never give up on your dreams". When questioned about his background, the actor gave vague answers such as, "I am a man of Africa". One admirer in Douala remarked, "He makes us feel that we too can do things that other people can admire."

=== Critical Assignment ===
In 2003, Guinness produced the feature film Critical Assignment (French: Engagement critique). Mitchell, credited as Michael Power, stars. The film's focus on the world's water crisis gained endorsement from the United Nations Environment Programme (UNEP) and the film carries their Logo.

Critical Assignment was uniquely shot in five African countries, and engaged only local actors and crew. According to Frank, it is "the largest Pan-African marketing initiative ever undertaken by Guinness Africa".

The film went on to be distributed in the USA and the rest of the world. It opened the NY African Film Festival at the Lincoln Center for the Performing Arts in New York City, as well as won the Jury Prize for best Feature Film at the Hollywood Black Film Festival.

== Adam King campaign ==
In 2002, Guinness applied the Michael Power formula to Asia with the character Adam King. The campaign featured such tag lines as: "Everyday someone, somewhere achieves something new. Sometimes on a grand, dramatic scale. Sometimes on a more personal scale." As of 2004, Guinness ranked among the top three beer labels in Singapore and Malaysia, with a 20 per cent marketshare across Southeast Asia. Malaysia was the brand's third largest market in the region and sixth largest market worldwide.

== "Guinness Greatness" campaign ==
Diageo, owner of the Guinness brand, cancelled the Michael Power campaign in 2006. They replaced it with the "Guinness Greatness" campaign, which they claim emphasizes the "drop of greatness" in everyone, in contrast to the high-tension heroics of the Power character.
