= List of James Bond gadgets =

This is a list of James Bond gadgets featured in the Bond films, organised by the film eras of its actor. The original books and early adaptations had only relatively minimal pieces like the modified attache case in From Russia, with Love. The James Bond films have featured an array of exotic equipment and vehicles, which often prove to be critically useful to Bond.

However, the gadgets took on a more spectacular profile starting with the film version of Goldfinger, and its tremendous success encouraged the following films to have Bond supplied with still more equipment. For instance, it became an expected scene in each film where Q would present and demonstrate Bond's assigned tools for the mission, and it was a near guarantee that each and every piece would be invaluable to Bond in the field. Bond gadgets became an example of the literary technique of Chekhov's gun. Fans eventually complained that the use of gadgets became excessive in the Roger Moore films, particularly in Moonraker, and subsequent productions struggled to find a balance in which gadgets could have a place without giving the impression that the character unduly depended on them or using stories that arbitrarily included situations that exactly fit the use of the gadgets assigned.

This article concerns the gadgets James Bond typically carried on his person, along with gadgets and gimmicks used by allies and villains. It does not include the main doomsday device associated with the film. It does not include makeshift gadgets or weapons, animals, or general spy equipment and installations such as disguises / fake passports, surveillance equipment, secret passages / trap doors, remote-controlled detonations, unless particularly notable.

== Sean Connery era (1962–1967; 1971) ==
=== Dr. No ===
Geiger counter
Bond has to request one from Britain before using it to determine the radioactivity of Crab Key's rocks, suggesting they were uncommon pieces of equipment. The very first James Bond gadget.
Cigarette with cyanide
Used by the "chauffeur" to commit suicide rather than being interrogated by Bond.
Dragon tank
Tank vehicle equipped with flamethrowers but popularised as a dragon.
Bionic Hands
Dr. No's signature prosthetic hands, which he started using after losing his real hands to experiments on radiation. They possess great strength, but lack dexterity.

=== From Russia with Love ===
James Bond's briefcase
A special briefcase issued to all double-0 personnel featuring:

- AR-7 .25 calibre (the AR-7 was chambered for .22 LR only, so this is either a one-off by Q branch, or an error), survival rifle with infrared telescope and detachable suppressor. Another error is that Bond tells Kerim that he only has one shot, but the AR-7 was semi-automatic, supplied with two magazines in the butt-stock/storage.
- Twenty rounds of ammunition for the rifle concealed within the case
- 50 gold sovereigns concealed within the case
- Tear gas cartridge disguised as talcum powder, set to discharge when the briefcase is opened incorrectly.
- Spring-loaded throwing knife accessible from the case's outside.

Bug detector
A small device that detects the presence of phone taps.
Dagger shoe
A shoe with a concealed poisoned blade tip. Worn by SPECTRE agents, including Rosa Klebb and Morzeny. Dagger shoes were used in other non-James Bond films and animation such as Trigun, The Pink Panther Strikes Again, The Punisher and The Dark Knight.
Garrote watch
A wristwatch from which a wire garrote can be drawn. Preferred weapon by SPECTRE assassin recruit Red Grant.
Periscope
A gift from the Royal Navy installed below the Russian embassy. Used to spy on the Russian conference room.
Tape recorder camera
A small reel-to-reel tape recorder hidden within a camera, used to interrogate Tatiana.

=== Goldfinger ===
Oddjob's hat
Oddjob, Goldfinger's henchman, uses a special bowler hat with a metal ring inside the brim as a throwing weapon. The hat is capable of slicing through stone and metal or breaking a person's neck when thrown hard enough (although it would most likely be capable of severing the neck, and not just breaking it).
Homing beacons
Also known as “homers”, used to track people. A miniaturised one is placed in the heel of Bond's shoe; another, larger one, is placed on car and can be tracked up to 150 miles.
Industrial laser
Used by Goldfinger trying to kill Bond. Powerful enough to put a laser dot on the moon, but at very close range able to cut through steel. This laser was later used to cut open the vault of Fort Knox. This film showcases the very first of its kind, as this weapon takes on various forms throughout the James Bond series.
Parking meter that releases tear gas
One of Q's gadgets under test.
Drysuit with bird on top
A drysuit for snorkeling with a gull on top.

=== Thunderball ===
Homing pill
When Bond takes this pill, it emits a signal that can be detected only by a certain receiver.
Remote-controlled doors
Although not a significant piece of technology today, at the time it was new. Used by main villain Emilio Largo to open a secret panel which leads to the SPECTRE briefing room in Paris, France.
Air supply
A small device that can be carried on the person without notice and when in use, is held in the mouth to provide four minutes of air in emergencies when the user has to go underwater. (Effectively a miniature Scuba set.)
Jetpack
A Bell Rocket Belt jetpack is used to propel Bond into the air during his escape in the opening gambit after killing Jaques Bouvar. Bond uses a Bell Textron jetpack in Die Another Day
Underwater jetpack
Bond is equipped with a jet-propelled scuba tank.
Breitling 'Top Time' Diver Chronometer watch
with built-in Geiger counter.
Underwater camera
capable of taking eight shots in succession in darkness using an infra-red film.
Geiger counter camera
A camera that conceals a Geiger counter. Bond gives this to Domino to look for the bombs on the yacht.
Miniature Very pistol
a pocket-sized flare gun firing a red signalling beacon.
Cassette recorder hidden in book
Bond uses this to learn that Quist is hiding in his hotel room.
Electrocution staff chair
With the press of a button, Blofeld electrocutes the staff member on the seat which he sits on, then the seat drops down into the floor and comes back empty.
Skyhook
Comes as a grappling suspender attached to a weather balloon that Bond can attach to his utility harness. With the aid of a specialised aircraft (B-17) installed with specialised braces, Bond and Domino are hoisted up into the air and out of the area.

=== You Only Live Twice ===
Mini-rocket cigarette
Tiger Tanaka gives Bond a cigarette capable of shooting a rocket-powered projectile accurately up to 30 yards. Used in Blofeld's volcano to kill a technician standing by the entrance controls to enable his allies to storm the base.
Waterproof body bag
Used at Bond's own "funeral", this bag is waterproof and equipped with a breathing mask enabling Bond to breathe while being dumped overboard. The bag is even waterproof enough to allow him to wear a complete uniform before his briefing with M.
Jet Propelled Bullets
Developed by Tiger Tanaka's facility, these bullet feature extra jet propulsion for added firepower. However they were not used.
Gyrojet rocket guns
Prototype guns using a small rocket-propelled projectile rather than conventional ammunition. A limited number were made in real life for trials by the US and British military forces, but the design never caught on, and the guns and ammunition are now very collectible (and therefore highly sought after and expensive).
X-Ray Desk
Used by Osato to identify any concealed firearms that his prospective 'clients' may have.
Poison-delivering string
Used by a Japanese SPECTRE assassin to deliver a dose of poison from an attic by having it running along its length to land directly in the victim's mouth. Referenced or used several times in subsequent popular culture as well, such as in the gamebook series The Way of the Tiger.
Bo with retractable spear
Used by a SPECTRE henchmen who infiltrated Tanaka's base in an attempt to assassinate Bond.
Lipstick gas
Helga Brant uses a lipstick case to discharge disorienting gas.
Safe Cracking Machine
A pocket-sized device used by Bond to decipher the combination lock code of Osato's office safe.

=== Diamonds Are Forever ===
Biometric fingerprint scanner
A projector-like device used by Tiffany Case in her Amsterdam apartment to identify her guests. One such example of how this device is used is when she takes the glass which Bond was using, then dusting the surface for a print and running it through the device and comparing it with a known fingerprint sample of her expected guest, Peter Franks.
Fake fingerprint
Bond uses a fake fingerprint that clings to his thumb to trick the fingerprint scanner, leading Tiffany Case to believe he is Peter Franks.
Piton pistol
Fires a grappling piton, complete with line; range about 10–15 metres. Also used as an improvised weapon against one of Blofeld's doppelgangers.
Pocket snap trap
A small gadget hidden in a pocket to give a person performing an unwanted search on the wielder a painful surprise.
Electromagnetic RPM Controller Ring
Q created a ring that, when used, ensures a jackpot at any mechanical slot machine.
Voice changer
Blofield uses this to trick employees that he is Willard Whyte. Q puts together a makeshift one to fool Blofield, remarking that he made one for "the kids last Christmas."
Water ball
Used by Bond to "walk" on water when he is parachuted near Blofield's platform.

=== Never Say Never Again (non-Eon; 1983) ===
Pen gun
A Montblanc 149 fountain pen emblazoned with the Union Flag of the UK that shoots a rocket propelled explosive dart disguised as the nib, albeit with delayed effects.
Rolex wristwatch
equipped with a small laser beam cutting tool.

== David Niven era (1967) ==
=== Casino Royale (non-Eon; 1967) ===
Cigarette gun
Similar to the one used in the later Eon movie You Only Live Twice. Used by "Little Jimmy" Bond to kill the firing squad that tried to execute him in one scene.
Sleeping pills
Although these are used in hospitals today, Miss Goodthighs tried to knock out Evelyn Tremble before he could play baccarat against Le Chiffre.
Suit with various gadgets in the pockets
Q tries to explain this to Evelyn Tremble, but he ignores him.
Bagpipe machine gun
Used by Vesper Lynd to kill Tremble.
Minox B 8x11 Camera
Used by Q.

== George Lazenby era (1969) ==
=== On Her Majesty's Secret Service ===
Radioactive lint
In the beginning of the movie, Q shows M a homing device made out of lint.
Safe-cracker
A device that consists of a flexible cable ending in a grapple that fits over a typical safe combination lock. It is coupled with a photocopier.
Minox spy camera
Bond uses a small camera to take snap shots of a map that shows where the "Angels of Death" are to release a biological agent.

== Roger Moore era (1973–1985) ==
=== Live and Let Die ===
Rolex Submariner
This specially modified Submariner has a powerful electromagnet that, in theory, can even deflect a bullet. The watch bezel also spins to operate like a mini circular saw that can cut ropes.
Side mirror dart gun
The side mirror of Kananga's Cadillac Eldorado fires a poisoned dart.
Prosthetic arm
Tee Hee's mechanical arm which contains a very strong claw capable of crushing and cutting through objects.
"Felix Lighter"
Radio transmitter/receiver disguised as a car cigarette lighter.
Bug sweeper
a hand-held device that can sweep a room for electronic microphones.
Clothing brush communicator
A lint brush with a communicator.
Flute communicator
Baron Samedi uses this device as a regular flute and as a direct radio transmission communicator to Dr. Kananga
Shark gun
Fires special pellets that expel highly pressurised air to make the target explode.

=== The Man with the Golden Gun ===
The Golden Gun
Scaramanga assembles his Golden Gun using a pen (which acts as the barrel) screwed into a cigarette lighter (which acts as the firing chamber), a cigarette case (which acts as the handle), and a cuff link (which acts as the trigger). This gun however is limited to only one bullet.
Solex Agitator
Device that enables the utilisation of solar energy as a power source on an industrial scale.
Solar Power Plant
A facility developed by Scaramanga during his apprenticeship with Hi-Fat which utilises the solar power from the Solex Agitatior. Scaramanga had plans to sell it to the highest bidder before the facility was destroyed indirectly by Goodnight.
Industrial Laser Cannon
A weapon that comes with the use of the solex agitator. Similar to the industrial lasers used by Auric Goldfinger and Blofeld, this weapon was used to destroy Bond's aircraft docked at Scaramanga's island.
Tracking Device
Used to track Scaramanga's flying car. A homing beacon in the lowest button of Goodnight's frock.

=== The Spy Who Loved Me ===
Seiko Quartz watch
with tape that resembles a label maker to receive messages from MI6.
Ski pole gun
A specially designed ski pole which is modified to fire .30 calibre rounds from a four-shot magazine in the handle.
Jaws' Teeth
Made of stainless steel, his razor sharp teeth are what he uses to dispose of his victims by biting into their jugular.
Microfilm reader
assembled from a cigarette case and lighter
Stun gas cigarette
The cigarette used by Soviet agent Triple X, could unleash a knockout blow of stun gas when blown through.
Q Branch gadgets

- A hovering tea tray that can be magnetically accelerated to a speed that can sever someone's head
- Spring-loaded poofah that acts like an ejection seat
- Hookah / Shisha pipe that doubles as a machine gun
- Cement sprayer, later used by the Lotus Esprit
- Camel saddle with sword blade that sticks out of the seat

Motorcycle sidecar missile
A rocket-powered missile in the form of a sidecar, launched by a Kawasaki Z900

=== Moonraker ===
Wrist-mounted dart gun
A dart gun concealed under the wearer's sleeve. Uses wearer's nerve impulses to fire armour-piercing or cyanide-tipped darts.
Safe-cracking device
Shows an X-ray of the lock mechanism as well as the combination status. It is concealed within a cigarette case.
Spy camera
A mini-camera imprinted with 007.
Gondola hovercraft
A gondola equipped with a propeller engine; it can also convert into a hovercraft.
Poison pen
Holly Goodhead's pen that contains a needle to inject someone with poison.
Notebook dart
Goodhead's notebook that shoots a poison dart. Bond calls it a "fairly deadly diary".
Perfume flamethrower
Goodhead's perfume bottle that shoots flame.
Transmitter purse
A transmitter in Goodhead's purse, complete with antenna and transmitting sounds.
Exploding bolas
Developed by Q branch, designed to entrap a human and then explode.
Mexican machine gun
Developed by Q branch, a mannequin of a Mexican taking a siesta that splits open to reveal an automatic machine gun.
Laser guns
Used by both sides in combat in outer space and in the space station.
Seiko wristwatch
Contains a remote detonator and explosive charge and fuse inside the back compartment.

=== For Your Eyes Only ===
Arm cast
Developed by Q-Branch, but not used in the field. This would look like an ordinary cast on a broken arm, except that it can also be used on an assailant coming from the back by springing out and bashing the perpetrator.
Spiked umbrella
Also developed by Q-Branch but not used in the field, this normal looking umbrella would have hooked spikes come out of the edges and close on the victim's neck when rain pours on the top.
Identigraph
A computer system used to assemble a phantom photo of a person by selecting characteristics from a variety of lists including hair colour, hair style, nose form, style of eyeglasses etc. It can then be used to match with people in their spy agency databases. This device references the Identicast system referred to in the Ian Fleming novel Goldfinger.
Seiko wristwatch
Receives digital message read-outs and contains a 2-way radio/transmitter for voice communications.

=== Octopussy ===
Loaded backgammon dice
Used by Khan to ensure a victory every time, Bond then uses the dice against Khan breaking his "winning streak".
Q's rope
Q attempts to recreate the Indian rope trick
Door with spikes
Smithers of Q Branch has a spiked door that smashes whoever uses its knocker
Homing device
A bug installed by Q in the Faberge egg
Mont Blanc fountain pen
Contains a mixture of nitric and hydrochloric acids to dissolve metals. The top is an earpiece listening device that works with Bond's wristwatch and the homing device in the egg.
Seiko wristwatch
Contains a homing device tracker and liquid crystal TV that works with Q Branch's surveillance cameras. The watch is a Seiko G757 5020 Sports 100.
Yo-yo saw
A rotating circular saw blade attached to a string so that it could be used in the same manner as a conventional yo-yo.

=== A View to a Kill ===
Snooper the robotic dog
One of Q Branch's surveillance inventions. A small, animal-like remote controlled camera unit that can transmit audio/video from the head of the unit to a receptacle for the signal. It was used as demonstration near the beginning of the movie and at the end to find Bond.
Electric shaver bug detector
Detects surveillance bugs, in the form of an electric shaver. Philips brand.
Polarising sunglasses
Allows the ability of seeing clearly through tinted glass.
Ring camera
Contains a miniature camera.
Checkbook reader
Uses ultra-violet light to read previously written material by picking up the indentations of pen marks on paper.
Credit card lock pick
Has an electronic ability to open locks. The Sharper Image brand.
Zorin's walking stick
Contains an RC steroid injector used to improve the performance of his racing horses during a race. Also contains various controls for his racetrack and various other materials at his estate.

== Timothy Dalton era (1987–1989) ==
=== The Living Daylights ===
Cigarette case binoculars
This device is made to look like a cigarette case, but opens up to a pair of small binoculars
Ghettoblaster
A shoulder fired rocket launcher disguised as a portable stereo (boombox).
Rake metal detector
A garden rake that rotates back and forth to monitor the grounds for the MI6 operatives. Used to detect Bond's Walther PPK.
Whistle-activated keychain
A multi-purpose keychain that can release stun gas or explode depending on the tune whistled. It also has a lock pick that can open 90% of the world's locks.
Revolving sofa
Q Branch is testing a sofa that swallows whoever sits on it, as demonstrated by one of his assistants.
Milk bottle hand grenades
While disguised as a milkman, Necros throws milk bottles that explode on contact.

=== Licence to Kill ===
Exploding alarm clock
"Guaranteed never to wake up anybody who uses it."
Dentonite toothpaste
Plastic explosives disguised as ordinary tube of toothpaste. The receiver that picks up the signal from Bond to blow the explosives is disguised as a packet of cigarettes.
Signature camera gun
A camera that can be taken apart and assembled into a sniper rifle. The grip is programmed to recognise only Bond's hand.
Laser Polaroid camera
When the flash is used on this camera, it shoots a laser. It can also take x-ray pictures.
Broom radio
used by Q to communicate with Bond's companion while disguised as a grounds man. Q throws this item away after using it.

== Pierce Brosnan era (1995–2002) ==
=== GoldenEye ===
Grappling belt
A size 34 leather belt that conceals a piton gun hidden behind the buckle. It can fire out up to 75 feet (23 m) of high tensile wire designed to support the weight of an average person.
Parker Jotter ballpoint pen grenade
Contains a class-four grenade. A four-second fuse is armed after three clicks in succession. Another three clicks disarms it. Used by Bond to escape his captors after Boris nervously clicks it.
Wristwatch
An Omega Seamaster Professional (the first of James Bond's non-Seiko/Rolex gadget watches) with built-in laser cutter and a remote detonator.
Digital binoculars
A combination of digital camera, binoculars and a satellite uplink to send visual data.
X-ray document scanner
Q has a document scanner disguised as a tea tray.
Phone booth trap
Q Branch is testing a BT telephone box with a large airbag which expands and crushes the person inside.
Wheelchair and leg cast missile
Tested by Q Branch, this gadget was made to look like someone had broken their leg, when in fact, the leg hid a missile, which could be fired from the seated position.
Door decoder
Small device that can be fitted onto keypad locked electronic doors that finds the combination and displays it on its screen. Used by 006 in the pre-credit sequence.
Ejector seat office chair
An ejector seat disguised as an ordinary office chair. Adjusting it will blast the chair across a distance. Is only seen whilst Q is telling Bond to bring everything back in pristine condition.

=== Tomorrow Never Dies ===
Ericsson JB988 (mobile phone)
This was a concept phone designed by Ericsson. The phone had a variety of features, including:
- a stun gun, containing a 20,000 Volt shock to any unauthorised user, and is also handy at disabling a high tech door lock.
- a fingerprint scanner/analyser/transmitter that can also be used for opening high-tech fingerprint-identification locks
- Antennae lock pick, which detaches from the phone and when inserted into a keyhole, hitting a key on the phone can then open the lock.
- "Flip-open" remote control for operating his BMW 750iL (Directional steering pad, LCD monitor for the front and rear view, controls to fire rocket launcher and operate the car's other defence mechanisms)
Much of the phone's style, including its "flip-open" design, was incorporated a few years later into the Ericsson R380, an early smartphone. The R380 combined a fully functional mobile phone, PDA-like tools and WAP services.
Omega Seamaster watch
Taken by Bond from the Chinese safehouse, the watch had a small, detachable charge that could be detonated by turning the watch's dial. It was later used to remotely destroy a glass jar that had a grenade lodged inside.
Cigarette lighter bomb
A disguised timed explosive/grenade.
Spike fan
Weapon developed by Wai Lin's counterpart division to Q Branch. Appears to be a Chinese fan, but when opened, several metal spikes with strings attached are thrown. Due to its brief appearance with no additional explanation, it is unclear whether the strings are for entanglement or a similar purpose like a taser, or to retract the spikes.
Rickshaw defence mechanism
This was used to knock out an enemy. A button is pressed, and an upper part of a bike-based rickshaw, which appears to be parked, ejects, knocking out the target.
Dragon flamethrower
Bond commented on the fact that this device was "very novel." Although this appears to be a sculpture of a dragon's head, pulling back one of the horns emits a high yield flamethrower, which makes the sculpture look like a fire-breathing dragon.
Wristband grappling hook
A wristband that shoots a grappling hook that Wai Lin uses to escape a building in the beginning
Earring lock pick
At least one of Wai Lin's earrings conceals a lock pick, which she uses to escape from a pair of handcuffs.
Sea-Vac drill
Used by Elliot Carver to destroy anything in his path—And Bond uses it to kill him.

=== The World Is Not Enough ===
Explosive eyeglasses
Remotely detonates a flash-bang. The explosive charge is actually housed in the pistol that is confiscated from Bond in the film's opening scene.
Bagpipe flamethrower and machine gun
Was seen only in Q's testing lab.
Avalanche ski jacket
Inflates into a sealed sphere.
X-ray eyeglasses
Enables X-ray vision for checking for concealed weapons.
Credit card lock pick
Concealed in a normal-looking credit card with a removable strip that activates a spring-loaded multifunction lock pick.
Omega Seamaster wristwatch
Contains a grappling hook with fifty feet of high-tensile micro-filament and a high intensity lighted bezel.
Cane gun
A seemingly ordinary ornate-looking walking cane used by Valentin Zukosky. Doubles as a gun with a trigger built into the handle.

=== Die Another Day ===
Single digit sonic agitator
A "standard issue" ring for the finger which is actually an "ultra high-frequency single digit sonic agitator unit" that can shatter bullet-proof glass (or any " 'unbreakable' glass", as commented by Q in the movie) or disable another person.
Omega Seamaster wristwatch
Omega Seamaster 300M Chronometer - Contains an explosive detonator and laser beam cutter. The new Q states that this watch is Bond's 20th, which is a reference to the fact that Die Another Day is the 20th James Bond film.
Dream simulator
Gustav Graves uses this device to have dreams as he has insomnia.
Virtual reality headset
Used by James Bond for training and by Moneypenny for romancing Bond's virtual avatar.

Several gadgets from previous James Bond films are featured, including Rosa Klebb's stiletto knife shoe, the jetpack from Thunderball and the re-breather apparatus from Thunderball.

== Daniel Craig era (2006–2021) ==
Since the reboot of the franchise with Casino Royale, the character of Q and his lab had been absent from the films until Skyfall.

=== Casino Royale ===
Sony Ericsson K800
Mobile phone with sophisticated GPS and 3.2 megapixel digital camera, with the ability to take multiple pictures very rapidly.
Microchip implant
Bond's arm is implanted with a microchip that helps MI6 keep track of his whereabouts; it also monitors Bond's vital signs, which are transmitted back to MI6 for analysis.
Explosive keychain
Remotely detonated by a cell phone message.
Portable defibrillator
Placed in the glove compartment of Bond's vehicle.

=== Quantum of Solace ===
Sony Ericsson C902
This mobile phone has a built in identification imager, capable of compiling a composite facial image of a potential suspect even when the person being photographed is looking to the side. This phone can also receive information immediately regarding the suspect as it is also tied into the MI6 data mainframe.
Multi-touch table computer
a large conference table that has multi-touch capabilities, allowing users to share documents and pictures of people.

=== Skyfall ===
Walther PPK/S 9mm short
A smartgun version equipped with a palm-print reader, only enabling the gun to fire when it detects Bond's palm-print.
Radio transmitter
A simple radio transmitter that allows MI6 to track Bond's location when activated. Bond expresses his disappointment at the poor selection of gadgets at his disposal from the new Q (Ben Whishaw), who explains that Q branch no longer go in for "exploding pens". Regardless, that simple gadget proves invaluable when it secretly leads MI6 to Silva's lair where he is holding Bond prisoner.
Sony Xperia T
Omega Seamaster wristwatch
Omega Seamaster Planet Ocean and Omega Seamaster Aqua Terra

=== Spectre ===
Smart blood
Implanted into Bond, the nanoparticles allow Q Branch to monitor his whereabouts via Satellite GPS. The smart blood is also used in No Time to Die.
Omega Seamaster wristwatch
Omega Seamaster 300 (special Spectre limited edition) with two-tone NATO strap. Built in explosive charge with a one-minute timer. The real watch is magnetic-resistant up to 15,000 Gauss.
Laser microphone
A microphone attached to Bond's SMG in operation in Mexico.

=== No Time to Die ===
Magnetic bodysuit
Allows the person wearing the bodysuit to fall down a lift shaft and be safely stopped at the bottom with the magnets attached to the walls.
Blofeld's eye
A bionic eye that allows Blofeld to communicate remotely with others. It also has a video log of what it has seen.
Nanobot virus
The main weapon in the film, a virus that can be programmed to kill a person and their blood-related families based on their DNA sequencing. Transmittable by air and by contact.
EMP watch
A watch that emits an electromagnetic pulse to disable nearby electronics.
Q-Dar
Allows Bond and the team to map the architecture of the facility as he moves through it.

== See also ==
- List of James Bond vehicles
- Outline of James Bond

== Other media ==
- James Bond Gadgets: Discover the Secret Technology of the World's Greatest Spy (DVD). Lionsgate. 2015.
- Modern Marvels: James Bond Gadgets (DVD). A&E Home Video. 2007.
- Gresh, Lois H.; Weinberg, Robert (2006). The Science of James Bond: From Bullets to Bowler Hats to Boat Jumps, the Real Technology Behind 007's Fabulous Films. Wiley. ISBN 978-0471661955.
- Millard, Andre (2018). Equipping James Bond: Guns, Gadgets, and Technological Enthusiasm. Johns Hopkins University Press. ISBN 9781421426655.
