= Giù le mani... carogna! (Django Story) =

1970 film by Demofilo Fidani

Giù le mani carogna! (Django Story)
- Poster
- Directed by: Demofilo Fidani
- Starring: Jack Betts; Gordon Mitchell
- Release date: 1971
- Language: Italian

Giù le mani... carogna! (Django Story) (or simply The Django Story or Giù le mani... carogna!) is a 1971 Italian Spaghetti western film directed by Demofilo Fidani (credited as Lucky Dickinson). The film is known in English as Down with Your Hands... You Scum!

== Premise and production ==
Django enters a saloon and meets Wild Bill Hickok; and starts telling the story of various episodes of his life.

This premise allowed the film to re-use lengthy parts of footage from earlier films by Fidani, ...e vennero in quattro per uccidere Sartana! (1969), Quel maledetto giorno d'inverno... Django e Sartana... all'ultimo sangue!'' (1970), Arrivano Django e Sartana... è la fine (1970).

== Cast ==
- Jack Betts (credited as Hunt Powers) as Django
- Gordon Mitchell as Buck / Butch Bradley
- Dino Strano (as Dean Stratford) as Dea / Bobby O'Neill / El Zorro
- Jerry Ross as Bill Hickok

== Reception ==
An Italian review characterized the film as "A Western film directed in the most terrible way". A retrospective review, commenting on the poor quality of the film but also the financial limitations of its production, asks, "The cheapest Spaghetti ever made?"
