= Django (character) =

Film character

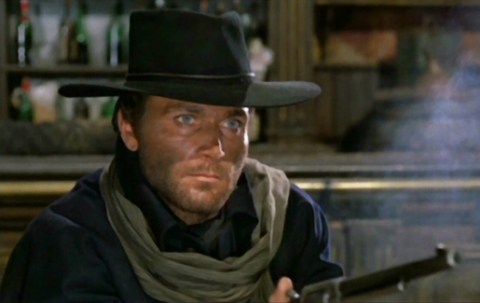
- Franco Nero as Django in Django (1966)
- First appearance: Django (1966)
- Created by: Sergio Corbucci
- Portrayed by: Franco Nero; Other: Terence Hill; Jack Betts; Anthony Steffen; Brad Harris; Gary Hudson; Tomas Milian; John Clark; Tony Kendall; George Eastman; Glenn Saxson; Jeff Cameron; Ruka Uchida; Franco Borelli

In-universe information
- Occupation: Dismissed Union Army soldier
- Spouse: Mercedes Zaro

Django is a fictional character who appears in a number of Spaghetti Western films. Originally played by Franco Nero in the 1966 Italian film of the same name by Sergio Corbucci, he has appeared in 31 films since then. Especially outside of the genre's home country Italy, mainly Germany, countless releases have been retitled in the wake of the original film's enormous success.

== Character biography ==
=== Franco Nero films ===
==== Django ====
Django is a 1966 Spaghetti Western directed by Sergio Corbucci starring Franco Nero as Django, a dismissed Union soldier who fought in the American Civil War. The film is set in 1869, four years after the end of the Civil War. After arriving in a bleak, mud-drenched town in the American Southwest and dragging a coffin behind him, Django gets caught up in a violent feud between exiled Mexican revolutionaries, led by General Hugo, and a gang of militant Neo-Confederates led by Major Jackson. Armed with a deadly Mitrailleuse volley gun, Django proceeds to play each side against the other in the pursuit of money. Ultimately, Django seeks revenge against Jackson, who murdered Django’s wife years before.

==== Django Strikes Again ====
Twenty years after the events in the first film, the title character has left the violent life of a gunslinger to live in seclusion in a monastery. He learns from a dying former lover that he has a young daughter, who has been kidnapped by the ruthless Hungarian arms dealer and slave trader, El Diablo (The Devil) Orlowsky. She and other kidnapped children work in Orlowsky's silver mine. Determined to find his daughter, Django gets goes to war against Orlowsky's private army.

== Appearances ==
=== Official films ===
==== Franco Nero films ====
- Django (1966) – The original film that introduced the character, directed by Sergio Corbucci and starring Franco Nero as the eponymous character.
- Django Strikes Again (1987) – The first official sequel to Django, starring Franco Nero as the eponymous character.

=== Unofficial films ===
The enormous success of the original Django movie in 1966 inspired unofficial sequels to be created by a multitude of studios, due to loose copyright laws in Italy at the time. Some actually feature the character of Django, and some titles just capitalize on the name, even though the character is not in the film.

- Texas, Adios (1966). Released as "Django, der Rächer/Django 2" in West Germany, "La Venganza de Django" in Peru, and "Django i kamp mod terrorbanden/Django - skyd først" in Denmark. Stars Franco Nero
- A Few Dollars for Django (1966) starring Anthony Steffen
- Django Shoots First (1966) starring Glenn Saxson
- Two Thousand Dollars for Coyote a.k.a. Django, A Bullet for You (1966) starring James Philbrook. Original title: "Django cacciatore di taglie".
- Two Sons of Ringo (1966) starring Franco Franchi
- Django Does Not Forgive (1966)
- Massacre Time a.k.a. Django the Runner (1966) starring Franco Nero
- God Forgives... I Don't! (1967)
- The Last Killer (1967) starring George Eastman
- Django Kill... If You Live, Shoot! (1967) starring Tomas Milian
- Don't Wait, Django… Shoot! (1967) starring Ivan Rassimov (as Sean Todd)
- Son of Django a.k.a. Return of Django (1967)
- Ten Thousand Dollars for a Massacre (1967) starring Gianni Garko
- Any Gun Can Play (1967)
- Two Faces of the Dollar (1967)
- Man, Pride and Vengeance (1967) starring Franco Nero. Original title: "L'uomo, l'orgoglio, la vendetta".
- Django Kills Softly (1967). Original title: "Bill il taciturno".
- Vengeance Is Mine (1967) a.k.a. 100,000 Dollars for a Killing. Original title: "Per 100.000 dollari ti ammazzo".
- Rita of the West (1967) (Italian: Little Rita nel West). The character is parodied by Lucio Rosato.
- Django, Prepare a Coffin (1968) starring Terence Hill - This movie is unique among the plethora of films which capitalized on Corbucci's in that it is not only a legitimate sequel, but was also originally intended to star Nero.
- If You Want to Live... Shoot! (1968)
- No Room to Die a.k.a. Hanging for Django a.k.a. A Noose for Django (1969) starring Anthony Steffen. Original title: "Una lunga fila di croci".
- False Django (1969)
- Django the Bastard (1969) starring Anthony Steffen
- One Damned Day at Dawn... Django Meets Sartana! (1970) starring Jack Betts
- Django Defies Sartana a.k.a. Django Against Sartana (1970) starring Tony Kendall
- Django and Sartana Are Coming... It's the End (1970) starring Jack Betts
- Django Is Always No. 2 (1971)
- W Django! a.k.a. Viva! Django a.k.a. A Man Called Django (1971)
- Django's Cut Price Corpses a.k.a. A Pistol for Django a.k.a. Even Django Has His Price. Original title Anche per Django le carogne hanno un prezzo (Even for Django, carrion has a price) (1971)
- Ballad of Django (1971)
- Gunman of One Hundred Crosses (1971)
- Shoot, Django! Shoot First! (1971)
- Kill Django... Kill First (1971)
- Down with Your Hands... You Scum! (1971)
- Django... Adios! a.k.a. Death Is Sweet from the Soldier of God (1972) starring Brad Harris. Original title: Seminò la morte... lo chiamavano Castigo di Dio.
- Long Live Django! (1972)
- Sukiyaki Western Django (2007)
- Django Unchained (2012). A Quentin Tarantino film starring Jamie Foxx and featuring the original actor of Django, Franco Nero, as a minor character. Tarantino's re-envisioned Django character is a former slave turned bounty hunter on a quest to liberate his wife.

=== TV series ===
Django is portrayed by Matthias Schoenaerts in the 2023 TV series of the same name. Franco Nero is featured as a minor character.

== See also ==
- Man with No Name, a milestone Spaghetti Western character
- Sartana, another Spaghetti Western character
- Jango Fett, a Star Wars character named after Django
- The Sabata Trilogy
