= Scarchilli =

Scarchilli is an Italian surname. Notable people with the surname include:

- Alessio Scarchilli (born 1972), Italian footballer
- Claudio Scarchilli (1924–1992), Italian actor
- Sandro Scarchilli (1934–1999), Italian actor
