= No Graves on Boot Hill =

1968 film

- Directed by: Sergio Garrone
- Written by: Franco Cobianchi; Sergio Garrone
- Produced by: Sergio Garrone; Ottavio Poggi
- Starring: Craig Hill; Evelyn Stewart
- Cinematography: Sandro Mancori
- Edited by: Antonietta Zita
- Music by: Vasili Kojucharov
- Release date: 1968
- Country: Italy

No Graves on Boot Hill (Italian: Tre croci per non morire), also known as Three Crosses Not to Die and Three Crosses of Death, is a 1968 Italian Spaghetti Western film co-produced, co-written and directed by Sergio Garrone under the pseudonym Willy S. Regan.

== Cast ==
- Craig Hill as Jerry
- Evelyn Stewart as Dolores
- Ken Wood as Reno
- Peter White as Paco
- Jean Louis as Rod
- Giovanni Ivan Scratuglia as Francisco Ortega
- Mariangela Giordano as Betty Fletcher
- Amedeo Timpani as Mulligan
- Raffaele Di Mario as Sheriff
- Bruno Arié as Brett
- Sandro Scarchilli as Juan
- Renato Lupi as Prior

== Production ==
The film was shot in various Lazio locations. Reportedly, Garrone had several difficulties working with lead actor Craig Hill.

== Reception ==
Rewieving the film, Italian critic Antonio Bruschini noted the similarities with Garrone's following western, Django the Bastard, particularly for its supernatural and gothic horror elements, even if "here the horror aspect is more implied than shown", and praised its production design and its sets, with its "wintry and gloomy landscapes that feel more suited to a thriller than a western".
