= Dry Summer =

- Susuz Yaz
- Directed by: Metin Erksan
- Written by: Metin Erksan; Kemal İnci; İsmet Soydan
- Based on: Susuz Yaz; 1962 novel by Necati Cumalı
- Produced by: Metin Erksan; Ulvi Doğan
- Starring: Hülya Koçyiğit; Erol Taş; Ercan Yazgan; Hakkı Haktan; Zeki Tüney; Alaattin Altıok; Niyazi Er; Ulvi Doğan; Yavuz Yalınkılıç
- Cinematography: Ali Uğur
- Edited by: Turgut İnangiray; Stuart Gellman
- Music by: Ahmet Yamacı; Manos Hadjidakis
- Production company: Hitit Filim
- Distributed by: Manson International
- Release date: 16 December 1963 (Turkey)
- Running time: 90 minutes
- Country: Turkey
- Language: Turkish

Dry Summer (Turkish: Susuz Yaz), released in the United States as Reflections, is a 1963 black-and-white Turkish drama film, co-produced, co-written and directed by Metin Erksan based on a novel by Necati Cumalı, featuring Erol Taş as a tobacco farmer, who dams a river to irrigate his own property and ruin his competitors. It is also available in an English dubbed U.S. theatrical release titled Reflections produced by William Shelton and edited by David E. Durston.

Martin Scorsese has supported the film's preservation through the World Cinema Foundation.

== Plot ==
Osman decides to dam the spring on his property because he knows the summer will be too dry to support all the farmers who rely on its waters. His younger brother Hasan urges him not to dam the spring, but reluctantly goes along with him. The farmers downstream are furious with Osman. They initiate a legal dispute. Osman is ordered to keep the spring open while the dispute is being resolved, but his own lawyer gets that order reversed. Hasan occasionally opens the dam out of pity for his neighbors, but Osman is quick to close it again.

Meanwhile, Hasan courts and marries a young woman named Bahar. On their wedding night, Osman bursts into their bedroom and orders Bahar to breed as many as 10 children for the family. Hasan has to put a dresser in front of the window to block out his drunken brother. Osman finds a crack in the wall and watches the consummation.

One of the farmers kills Osman's dog, prompting the brothers to keep watch at night to prevent further violence. That night, two farmers blow up the dam. Osman and Hasan chase the saboteurs. Osman fires several shots into the darkness, killing one of the farmers. He convinces Hasan to take the blame for the killing by arguing that Hasan is much younger and will get a lighter sentence.

Hasan is sentenced to 24 years, which is reduced to 8 because he was provoked. Osman uses his absence to make advances on Bahar. He destroys Hasan's letters to make it appear as if he has forgotten Bahar. When a prisoner named Hasan is killed in the same prison as her husband, Bahar is distraught. She flees the farm and returns to her mother. Osman convinces her to return by explaining that, as Hasan's widow, she owns half of everything.

Hasan is not dead, and he is eventually pardoned. On his way home from prison, he learns how Osman has tricked Bahar. He goes straight to confront his brother. Osman shoots first at Bahar who runs at him with an axe. He shoots repeatedly at Hasan, but Hasan manages to topple his brother into the spring and drown him. Osman's body washes down the sluice towards the farms he had deprived of water.

== Cast ==
- Hülya Koçyiğit - Bahar
- Erol Taş - Osman
- Ulvi Dogan - Hasan
- Alaettin Altiok
- Hakki Haktan
- Zeki Tüney
- Yavuz Yalinkiliç

== Production ==
Dry Summer helped introduce Turkish cinema to a global audience. It continues a theme of possessiveness that Erksan had previously explored in Revenge of the Snakes.

The film was censured by the Ministry of Interior's film censorship board which objected to Bahar's implied union with her dead husband's brother. The film was banned for fear of broadcasting negative images of Turkish society.

== Awards ==
The film won the Golden Bear at the 14th Berlin International Film Festival and the Biennale Award at the 25th Venice Film Festival. The film was also selected as the Turkish entry for the Best Foreign Language Film at the 37th Academy Awards, but was not accepted as a nominee.

== Social impact ==
Social and individual themes are covered in the movie, as in Necati Cumalı's Dry Summer story. The movie is about the right of property and the power struggle rising over land and water in a society in which agriculture-based production is dominant in the economy, a conflict such as the commodification and devaluation of women's value and body. The power struggle between the Kocabaş brothers and the villagers is told in both legal and violent ways.

== Television adaptation ==
A television adaptation of Susuz Yaz was announced in 2026 by Turkish production company Ay Yapım. Based on Necati Cumalı's literary work of the same name, the series is written by Sema Ergenekon and directed by Yusuf Pirhasan and Mehmet Can Bindal. It is scheduled to broadcast on Kanal D in Turkey.

Set in the 1970s in the Çarlak village of Adana's Çukurova region, the series follows brothers Osman and Hasan, whose relationship deteriorates amid disputes over land, water resources and their feelings for Bahar. The television adaptation expands the original story into a longer narrative, retaining its central themes of property ownership, social inequality, family conflict and control over natural resources.

The principal cast includes Mert Ramazan Demir as Osman, Lizge Cömert as Bahar and Batuhan Bozkurt Yüzgüleç as Hasan. Other cast members include Şebnem Bozoklu, İrem Sak, Serpil Gül, Deniz Celiloğlu, Umut Kurt, Begüm Akkaya and Özgür Daniel Foster.

Filming began in Adana in October 2026. The first promotional trailer was released later that month. The series is scheduled to premiere on Kanal D, although an exact broadcast date has not yet been announced as of November 2026.

== See also ==
- List of submissions to the 37th Academy Awards for Best Foreign Language Film
- List of Turkish submissions for the Academy Award for Best Foreign Language Film
