= Sandro Scarchilli =

Italian film actor

- Scarchilli in The Good, the Bad and the Ugly in 1966
- Born: April 22, 1934; Rome
- Died: August 31, 1999 (aged 65)
- Occupation: Film actor
- Years active: 1966-1978

Sandro Scarchilli (22 April 1934, in Rome – 31 August 1999) was an Italian film actor who appeared in several films in the late 1960s and 1970s.

He is best known in world cinema for his small debut role in the Spaghetti Western The Good, the Bad and the Ugly in 1966, where he played Chico, one of Tuco's Gang Members.

He appeared in Italian crime films, such as Doorman at I.E.I. in Kidnap Syndicate (1975), Park sweeper in Loaded Guns, Garozzi "Carlotta" in Fear in the City (1976), Belmondo's henchman in The Last Round (1976), Live Like a Cop, Die Like a Man (1976), and Fearless (1978).

Sandro, however, was never as famous as his brother Claudio Scarchilli who appeared in over twenty different films and who also appeared in The Good, the Bad and the Ugly.

He made his final appearance in 1978.

== Partial filmography ==
- The Good, the Bad and the Ugly (1966) - Chico, Mexican Peon
- Hate for Hate (1967)
- Bandidos (1967) - Vigonza Henchman (uncredited)
- I'll Sell My Skin Dearly (1968) - Mexican (uncredited)
- Cost of Dying (1968)
- Zorro the Fox (1968) - Bandit (uncredited)
- No Graves on Boot Hill (1968) - Juan
- A Noose for Django (1969) - Santana Henchman (uncredited)
- Django the Bastard (1969) - Hawkins Henchman (uncredited)
- Rough Justice (1970) - Machete's Man
- Adiós, Sabata (1970) - Mexican (uncredited)
- Have a Good Funeral, My Friend... Sartana Will Pay (1970) - Bandit (uncredited)
- Durango Is Coming, Pay or Die (1971) - Manuel Bienvenido (uncredited)
- Sheriff of Rock Springs (1971)
- Seminò morte... lo chiamavano il Castigo di Dio! (1972) - Ramon, Spirito Santo's Man (uncredited)
- Texas Bill (1972)
- Più forte sorelle (1973) - Mammola
- Loaded Guns (1975) - Park Sweeper (uncredited)
- Kidnap Syndicate (1975) - Doorman (uncredited)
- The Last Round (1976) - Belmondo Henchman
- Paura in città (1978) - (final film role)

== Bibliography ==
- Curti, Roberto (24 September 2013). Italian Crime Filmography, 1968-1980. McFarland Publishing. p. 332. ISBN 9780786469765.
