= Claudio Scarchilli =

Italian film actor

Claudio Scarchilli (10 February 1924, Rome – 25 July 1992) was an Italian film actor who appeared in film throughout the 1960s. He acted in nearly twenty films within that decade.

He is best known in world cinema for his small roles in several of Sergio Leone's films, portraying Pedro, member of Tuco's gang, in the Spaghetti Western The Good, the Bad and the Ugly in 1966, and Once Upon a Time in the West in 1968.

His brother Sandro Scarchilli was also an actor and also appeared in The Good, the Bad and the Ugly in 1966.

He made his last appearance in 1970.

== Selected filmography ==
- Messalina (1960)
- Pontius Pilate (1962) - Disma
- The Golden Arrow (1962) - Bandit
- Colossus of the Arena (1962)
- Gladiator of Rome (1962) - Gladiator (uncredited)
- The Fall of Rome (1963)
- Anthar l'invincibile (1964)
- Hercules, Prisoner of Evil (1964) - Lava
- Giants of Rome (1964)
- Hercules and the Treasure of the Incas (1964) - Dance Hall Customer (uncredited)
- Gunmen of the Rio Grande (1964)
- The Falcon of the Desert (1965) - Alì, l'oste
- Doc, Hands of Steel (1965) - Cantina Barman (uncredited)
- Due mafiosi contro Al Capone (1966)
- Wild, Wild Planet (1966) - Scientist on Planet Delfos
- War of the Planets (1966)
- For a Few Extra Dollars (1966) - Riggs Henchman
- The Good, the Bad and the Ugly (1966) - Pedro, Mexican Peon
- The Hellbenders (1966) - Indian Chief
- Dynamite Joe (1967) - Jack Foster
- Bandidos (1967) - Vigonza Henchman (uncredited)
- Tutto per tutto (1968) - Diego, Carranza's Man
- Cost of Dying (1968)
- Once Upon a Time in the West (1968) - Member of Frank's Gang (uncredited)
- A Noose for Django (1969) - Old Mexican (uncredited)
- Chuck Moll (1970) - Saloon Brawler (uncredited)
- Viva Cangaceiro (1970)
- Rough Justice (1970) - Juan's Foster Father (uncredited)
- Compañeros (1970)
- Quel maledetto giorno della resa dei conti (1971) - (final film role)
