= Mahmut Makal =

Turkish writer, poet and teacher

Mahmut Makal (January 1, 1930, in Gülağaç, Aksaray – August 10, 2018, in Ankara, Turkey) was a Turkish writer, poet and teacher who initiated the "Village Literature" movement in 1950 with the publication of his book ‘Bizim Köy’ (Our Village). This was translated into English as 'A Village in Anatolia' and published in 1954.

== Early life ==
Mahmut Makal was born in the hamlet of Demirci in the Gülağaç district of Aksaray on January 1, 1930. In 1943, he began studying literature and poetry at the Ivriz Village Institute. His poems were first published in 1945 in the magazine "Türk'e Doğru (Right for a Turk)" and in 1946 in the "Köy Enstitüsü (Village Institute)" magazine. He also attracted wider notice with his Village Notes in Varlık (Wealth) magazine.

After graduating from the Ivriz Village Institute in 1947, he worked as a village teacher in Nurgöz, Aksaray, for 6 years. In 1950. At the time he was only seventeen and found himself trying to teach in only the most rudimentary of school buildings at a time when many villagers still thought their imams could provide all the education needed by their children.

Makal's observations from these early years of teaching in a village in Central Anatolia were published in a book called ‘Bizim Köy’ (Our Village), the first work of the village literature movement. In the foreword to the English edition, Lewis V Thomas wrote that his book was "probably the first book that any bona fide Turkish peasant ever published" while its editor, Paul Stirling wrote that "Mahmud Makal is the first genuine villager...to describe the village from within". Written at a time of drought, famine and rationing after the Second World War, the book presented a warts and all portrait of grinding poverty and rampant superstition that did not find favour with the reform-minded authorities. It aroused strong reactions across Turkey, and Makal was arrested and imprisoned for a while.

== Later years ==
He enrolled at the Ankara Gazi Institute in 1953 and also visited France to undertake research at the European Sociology Center. In the 1965 elections he stood as a candidate in Istanbul for the Workers' Party of Turkey. He then worked as an inspector of primary schools in the Antalya, Ankara and Adana regions. In 1971, he left this job and started teaching Turkish at the İstanbul School for the Deaf and Dumb. Between 1971 and 1972 he managed Bizim Köy Publishing and in 1972 he taught Turkish Language and Literature at the University of Venice. In 1976 he retired from a position at the Karadeniz Copper Works. Aside from English, his books were translated into many languages including German, Russian, French, Italian, Hebrew, Hungarian and Bulgarian. In 1967 UNESCO nominated Makal as an example for young people.

In 2018 Makal died in the Hacettepe Teaching and Research Hospital in Ankara.

== A Village in Anatolia ==
In 1954 two of Makal's early books on village life in Demirci and Nürgöz - Bizim Köy (Our Village) and Köyümden (From My Village - were translated into English by Sir Wyndham Deedes and published together as A Village in Anatolia. A short book, it mainly consists of episodic descriptions of different aspects of village life such as "Ploughing With a Donkey" and "Where the Money is Kept". Most modern readers would probably find the editorial footnotes irritating since they are often critical of what Makal is saying based on his personal experience both growing up in and then teaching in a part of Anatolia very far from big-city life.

== Works ==
(source)

- Bizim Köy (Our Village) 1950
- Köyümden (From My Village) 1952
- Memleketin Sahipleri (Lords of the Land) 1954
- Kuru Sevda (Dry Passion) 1957
- 17 Nisan (17 April) 1959
- Köye Gidenler (Going to the Village) 1959
- Kalkınma Masalı (The Development Myth) 1960
- Eğitimde Yolumuz Nereye (Which Way Is Our Education Going?) 1960
- İplik Pazarı (Yarn Market) 1964
- Kamçı Teslimi (Giving Up the Whip) 1965
- Ötelerin Havası (The Air of Yonder) 1965
- Halktan Ayrı Düşenler (Those Who Are Separated From the People) (1965)
- Köpeksiz Köy (The Village With No Dogs) (1965)
- Yer Altında Bir Anadolu (An Underground Anatolia) 1968)
- Bu Ne Biçim Ülke (What Kind Of Country Is This?) 1968
- Zulüm Makinesi-Öğretmen Kıyımı (The Oppression Machine-Carnage of Teachers) 1969
- Kokmuş Bir Düzende (A Rotten Order) 1970
- Açlık Pınarı (The Hunger Spring) (1973)
- Değişenler (What Has Changed (Our Village)) (1975)
- Karanlığı Zorlayanlar (Thise Forcing Darkness) 1976
- Köy Enstitüleri ve Ötesi (Village Institutes and Beyond) 1979
- Bir İşçinin Günlüğünden (From A Worker’s Diary) 1980
- Hayal ve Gerçek-Değişenler (Dreams and Reality – What Has Changed?) (1987)
- Ağlatı (Tragedy) (1989)
- Faust'un Dediği (The Sayings of Faust)(1990)
- Anımsı Acımsı (A Bitter Memoir) (1990)
- Bakırdaki Kıvılcım (Spark in Copper) (1992)
- Köy Enstitüleri ya da Deli Memedin Türküsü (Villages Institutes, or The Song of Deli Memet) (1993)

== See also ==
- Fakir Baykurt
- Mevlüt Kaplan
