= Krista Nell =

Austrian film actress (1946–1975)

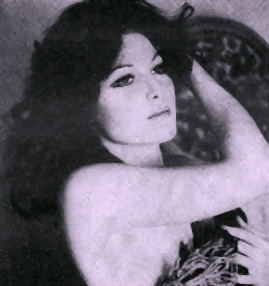
- Nell in 1974
- Born: Doris Kristanel; 21 January 1946; Vienna, Austria
- Died: 19 June 1975 (aged 29); Rome, Italy
- Occupation: Actress
- Partner: Ettore Manni

Krista Nell (born Doris Kristanel; 21 January 1946 – 19 June 1975) was an Austrian film actress.

== Career ==
Born Doris Kristanel, Nell debuted in French cinema, then moved to Rome where became a minor starlet in Italian genre films, especially spaghetti Westerns and commedie sexy all'italiana. Nell went on to star in such films as Ivanhoe, the Norman Swordsman, and spaghetti Westerns such as Paid in Blood, Blindman, Kill Django... Kill First and Django and Sartana Are Coming... It's the End.

Nell's final film was The Bloodsucker Leads the Dance in which she was supposed to be the main actress, but, because of her physical conditions, she turned in a secondary role.

Nell died of leukemia at age 29 on 19 June 1975.

== Personal life ==
She was the companion of actor Ettore Manni.

== Partial filmography ==
- Pierrot le Fou (1965) - Madame Staquet (uncredited)
- Your Money or Your Life (1966) - Geneviève
- The Beckett Affair (1966) - Paulette
- Massacre of Pleasure (1967) - Marion
- Kitosch, the Man Who Came from the North (1967) - Eva
- The Million Eyes of Sumuru (1967) - the Slave of Sumuru / Zoe
- Uno di più all'inferno (1968)
- The Longest Hunt (1968) - Tina
- Un corpo caldo per l'inferno (1969) - Greta Nielsen
- Tarzan in the Golden Grotto (1969) - Mary
- The Guerilla, or He Who Did Not Believe (1969) - Juanita - la femme d'un guerillero
- Eros e Thanatos (1969)
- Ombre roventi (1970)
- La banda de los tres crisantemos (1970) - Marilyn
- Les belles au bois dormantes (1970) - Christine
- Django and Sartana Are Coming... It's the End (1970) - Cleo
- Kill Django... Kill First (1971) - Julia -Amante di Burton
- Ivanhoe, the Norman Swordsman (1971) - Brenda
- The Feast of Satan (1971) - Hilda Salas
- Paid in Blood (1971) - Cora
- Blindman (1971) - Bride
- Karzan, il favoloso uomo della jungla (1972) - Fox's Wife (uncredited)
- Decameron n° 2 - Le altre novelle del Boccaccio (1972) - Egano's wife
- Sei iellato, amico hai incontrato Sacramento (1972) - Evelyn
- Le calde notti del Decameron (1972) - Suor Martuccia
- Decameron proibitissimo (Boccaccio mio statte zitto) (1972) - Donna Piccarda
- The Sensuous Doll (1972) - The Subservient Doll
- So Sweet, So Dead (1972) - Renata
- Indian Summer (1972) - Martine - the girl reading Daniele's palm (uncredited)
- Fratello homo sorella bona (1972) - Laura
- God Is My Colt .45 (1972) - Mary Bryan
- The Godfather's Friend (1972) - Layla
- Decameroticus (1972) - Isabella
- Mamma... li turchi! (1973) - Baroness
- Le amorose notti di Ali Baba (1973) - Yashira
- Prostituzione (1974) - Immacolata Mussomecci
- Delitto d'autore (1974) - Sonia
- The Bloodsucker Leads the Dance (1975) - Cora (final film role)
