= Lover of the Monster =

1974 film

- Film poster
- Directed by: Sergio Garrone
- Screenplay by: Sergio Garrone
- Produced by: Amedeo Mellone; Şakir V. Sözen
- Starring: Klaus Kinski; Katia Christine; Ayhan Işık; Caterina Chiani
- Cinematography: Emore Galeassi
- Edited by: Cesare Bianchini
- Music by: Elio Maestosi; Stefano Liberati
- Production company: Cinequipe
- Distributed by: Morini
- Release date: May 28, 1974 (Italy)
- Running time: 87 minutes
- Countries: Italy; Turkey

Lover of the Monster (Italian: Le amanti del mostro, lit. 'Lovers of the Monster') is a 1974 gothic horror film directed by Sergio Garrone and starring Klaus Kinski.

== Plot ==
Dr. Alex Nijinski (Klaus Kinski) stumbles upon a secret experimental laboratory when he returns to his wife's ancestral homestead. Work in the lab turns the curious doctor into a Jekyll and Hyde split personality, with the evil alter ago going on a killing rampage in the town which is blamed on a pair of tramps.

== Cast ==
- Klaus Kinski as Prof. Alex Nijinsky
- Katia Christine as Anijeska Nijinsky
- Ayhan Işık as Dr. Igor Walensky
- Marzia Damon as the farmer's wife
- Erol Taş as the Tramp
- Roberto Messina as the Farmer
- Bruno Arié as the Inspector
- Osiride Pevarello as Feodor Polanski
- Amedeo Timpani as the Judge
- Romano De Gironcoli
- Luigi Bevilacqua
- Pasquale Toscano

Although credited, Carla Mancini, Alessandro Perrella and Stella Calderoni do not appear in the film. Ayhan Işık, Erol Taş and Roberto Messina are not credited in the Italian prints of the film.

== Production ==
After directing the war film La colomba non deve volare, director Sergio Garrone began work on a horror film. After contacting the Italian distributor named Sabatini, he was introduced to the Rome-based Turkish producer Şakir V. Sözen. Sözen had previously produced Farouk Agrama's crime film L'amico del padrino and was offered the location of a huge villa and proposed casting the Turkish actor Ayhan Işık who had co-starred in Lamico del padrino. According to Garrone, Sözen suggested instead of making one film in six weeks, that they should make two films in eight weeks. This led to the production of both le amanti del mostro and The Hand That Feeds the Dead.

Le amanti del mostro was filmed in Istanbul and at Elios Studios in Rome.

== Release ==
Le amanti del mostro was released theatrically in Italy on 28 May 1974 where it was distributed by Morini.

== Footnotes ==
=== References ===
- Curti, Roberto (2013). Italian Crime Filmography, 1968-1980. McFarland. ISBN 978-0786469765.
- Curti, Roberto (2017). Italian Gothic Horror Films, 1970–1979. McFarland. ISBN 978-1476629605.
