= Ivanhoe, the Norman Swordsman =

- Directed by: Roberto Mauri
- Screenplay by: Piero Regnoli; Manuel Torres; Andre Tranche
- Story by: Piero Regnoli; Manuel Torres; Andre Tranche
- Starring: Mark Damon; Luis Davila; Krista Nell
- Cinematography: Sandro Mancori
- Edited by: Adriano Tagliavia
- Music by: Roberto Pregadio
- Production companies: Oceania Produzioni Cinematografiche; Les Films Corona; Talia Films
- Distributed by: Variety Distribution
- Release date: 29 April 1971
- Running time: 99 minutes
- Countries: Italy; France; Spain

Ivanhoe, the Norman Swordsman (Italian: La spada normanna) is a 1971 Capa e spada film directed by Roberto Mauri.

== Plot ==
After the death of King Henry I in 12th-century England, the throne is taken by Stephen Cunningham who claims to possess the mythical "Sword of Normandy." A man named Ivanhoe returns from years in the Holy Land knowing that Henry I's son, the rightful heir to the throne, died in the Crusades, and that Cunningham's sword is a fake. After forging alliances with a group of highwaymen and a band of traveling thespians, Ivanhoe reclaims the real sword that will topple Cunningham.

== Cast ==
- Mark Damon as Ivanhoe
- Luis Dávila as Stephen of Cunningham
- Krista Nell as Brenda
- Aveline Frederica as Kitty
- Vassili Karis as Trigui
- Alan Collins (aka Luciano Pigozzi) as Mortimer, the Principa
- Linda Sini as Wife of Mortimer
- Aldo Berti as Art
- Spartaco Conversi as Kitts
- Nello Pazzafini as Ghippo

== Production ==
Ivanhoe, the Norman Swordsman was shot in Barcelona Spain at Cardona's Castle and Cardona's Collegiate Church

== Release ==
Ivanhoe, the Norman Swordsman was released on April 29, 1971.

== See also ==
- List of Italian films of 1971
