= Angela Minervini =

Italian actress

Angela Minervini is an Italian actress, known for her roles in films such as La visita (1963), Thunder of Battle (1964), Questa sera parla Mark Twain (1965) and Run, Psycho, Run (1968).

== Filmography ==
Year	Title	Role	Notes
1962	His Days Are Numbered	Graziella	
1963	La visita	Chiaretta	
1964	Coriolanus: Hero without a Country	Livia	
1964	Monsieur	La serveuse du snack	
1964	Terror in the Crypt	Woman	Uncredited
1964	La donna è una cosa meravigliosa		(segment "Una donna dolce, dolce")
1965	Latin Lovers	La ragazzina della ricetta	(segment "Amore e morte")
1967	A Stranger in Town	Village Woman	Uncredited
1968	Django, Prepare a Coffin	Lucy	
1968	Run, Psycho, Run		(final film role)
