= Django Defies Sartana =

1970 Italian film by Pasquale Squitieri

- Poster
- Directed by: Pasquale Squitieri
- Screenplay by: Pasquale Squitieri; William Redford
- Starring: George Ardisson; Tony Kendall
- Production companies: PAC - Produzioni Atlas Cinematografica; BCR Produzioni Cinematografiche
- Release date: 1970
- Country: Italy

Django Defies Sartana (Italian: Django sfida Santana) is a 1970 Italian Spaghetti Western directed by Pasquale Squitieri (as William Redford). The film is also known as Django Against Sartana. or Django Challenges Sartana.

== Plot ==
Django is looking for the murderer of his brother Steve, whom he has found hanged near Tombstone. Django first believes Sartana, a rival bounty hunter, is the murderer and goes after him. However, after a fight, Django understands that he was wrong and both men decide to find the real culprit together.

== Cast ==
- George Ardisson as Sartana
- Tony Kendall as Django

== Production ==
The film is not an official part of either the Django or Sartana series and along with Demofilo Fidani's One Damned Day at Dawn… Django Meets Sartana! and Django and Sartana Are Coming... It's the End, was among three of the Django and Sartana films released in 1970.

The film largely uses the soundtrack from the film Il Figlio di Django from two years earlier and also had a soundtrack composed by Piero Umiliani

== Reception ==
An Italian contemporary review states that this is "a mediocre film, based upon characters, situations and developments more than predictable." A retrospective review on the Spaghetti Western Database finds the film "lame" and states that "As so often" (with Spaghetti Western films) the music (here composed by Piero Umiliani) "is the best part to remember."
