= Jack Betts =

American actor (1929–2025)

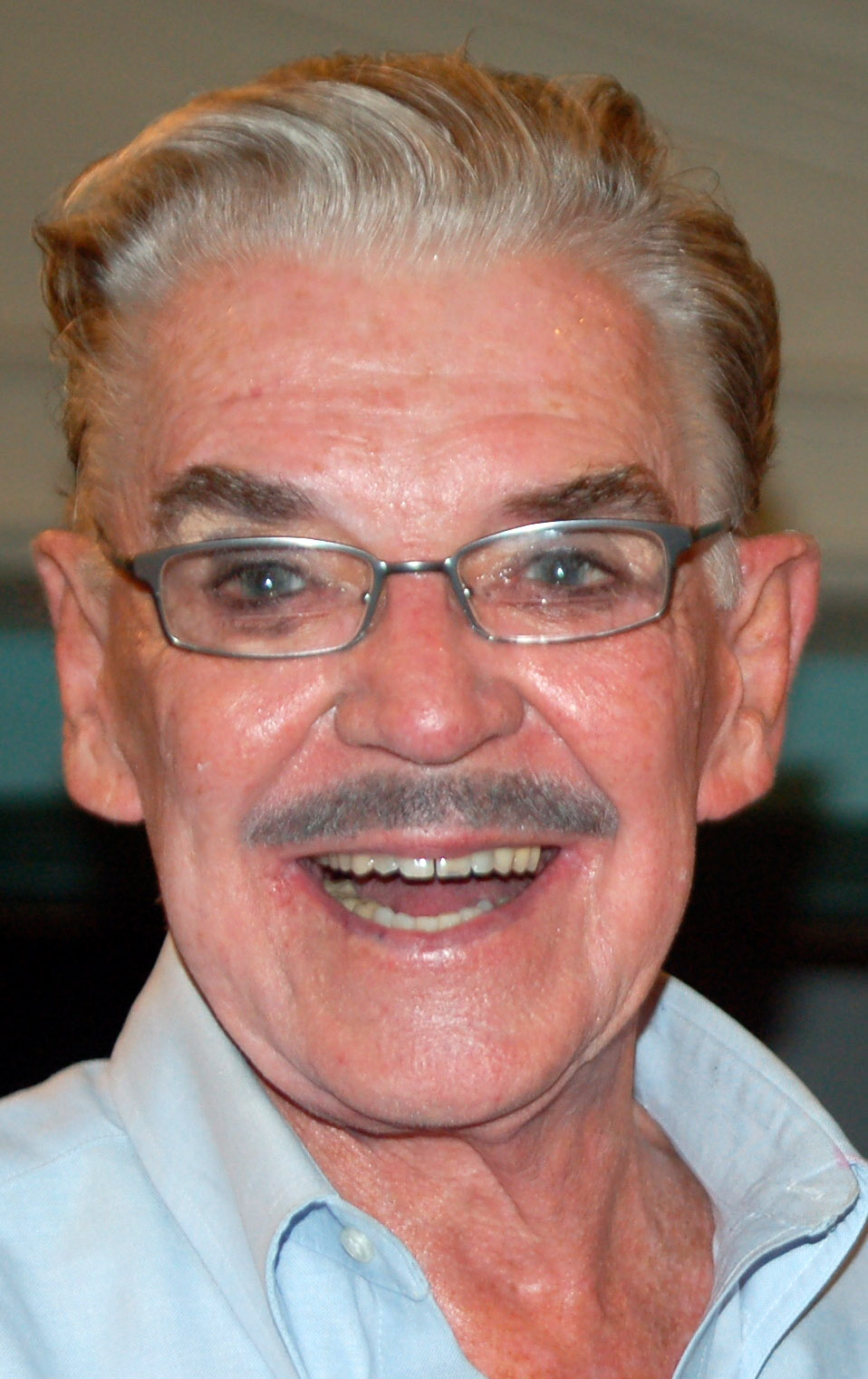
- Betts in 2010
- Born: Jack Fillmore Betts; April 11, 1929; Jersey City, New Jersey, U.S.
- Died: June 19, 2025 (aged 96); Los Osos, California, U.S.
- Other name: Hunt Powers
- Education: University of Miami; Actors Studio
- Occupation: Actor
- Years active: 1953–2018

Jack Fillmore Betts (April 11, 1929 – June 19, 2025), also credited as Hunt Powers, was an American actor. He appeared in over 100 film, stage, and television productions between 1953 and 2018. He was known for his roles on multiple daytime soap operas, including the early seasons of General Hospital, and as a leading man in several Spaghetti Western films in Italy. Later in his career, Betts was a character actor in films like Spider-Man (2002).

== Life and career ==
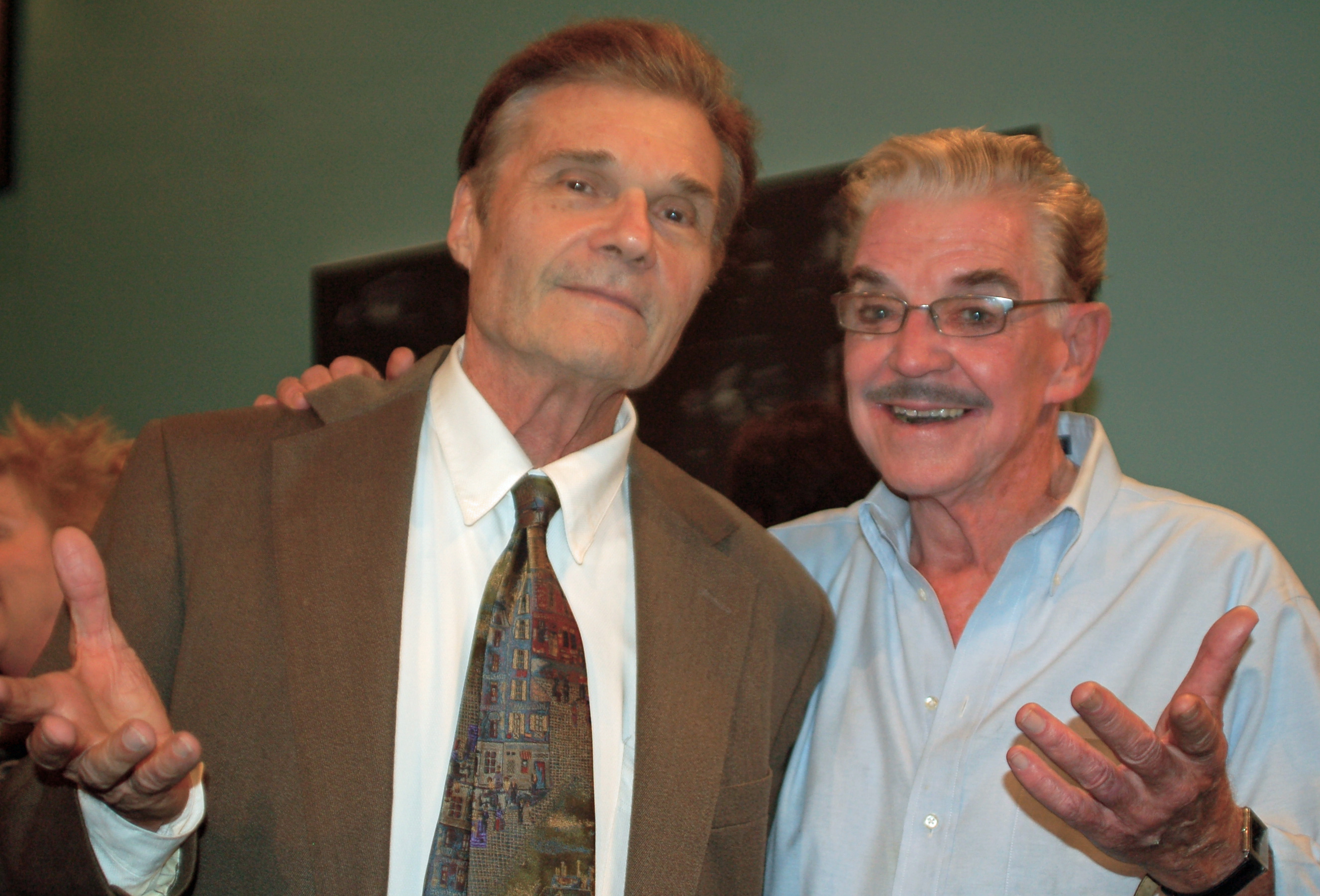
Betts (right) with Fred Willard in 2010

Betts was born on April 11, 1929, and raised in Jersey City, New Jersey. When he was 10 years old, he and his family moved to Miami, Florida. He auditioned for a talent contest on WIOD. He graduated from Miami Senior High School and attended the University of Miami in which he studied theatre. Betts started his career in 1953 in the play Richard III. He portrayed Chris Devlin in the CBS mystery series Checkmate (1960–1962). From 1963 to 1965, he portrayed Dr. Ken Martin in General Hospital. Among his numerous television appearances were four roles on the CBS drama series Perry Mason, including the role of Bert Nickols in the 1961 episode, "The Case of the Impatient Partner," Enos Watterton in the 1962 episode "The Case of the Double Entry Mind", murder victim George Parsons in the 1964 episode, "The Case of the Wooden Nickels," and murder victim Bruce Strickland in the 1966 episode, "The Case of the Fanciful Frail. Betts was also the author of Screen Test: Take One, a play about a soap opera that originated on a film set. In 1966, Betts went to Italy to star in the spaghetti western Sugar Colt. He regularly worked in Europe for several years, appearing mostly in Italian films where he was often credited under the name Hunt Powers. In the United States, he appeared mostly on television. He also played Mr. Fisher, an 80-year-old man on One Life to Live in 1982. In 2002, Betts played Henry Balkan in Sam Raimi's 2002 film Spider-Man, which was arguably his best known film role.

Betts died in his sleep on June 19, 2025, at his home in Los Osos, California, at the age of 96.

== Filmography ==
| Year | Title | Role | Notes |
|---|---|---|---|
| 1959 | The Bloody Brood | Cliff | |
| 1960 | The DuPont Show of the Month | Denis Eady | Episode: "Ethan Frome" |
| 1960 | The United States Steel Hour | Jack Taylor | Episode: "Revolt in Hadley" |
| 1961 | One Plus One | Bill Cannon | |
| 1961 | The Detectives | Tom Harper | Episode: "A Piece of Tomorrow" |
| 1961–1962 | Checkmate | Chris Devlin | 6 episodes |
| 1961–1966 | Perry Mason | Bruce Strickland / George Parsons / Enos Watterton / Bert Nickols | 4 episodes |
| 1962 | Bonanza | Jamie Wrenn | Episode: "The Jury" |
| 1963 | General Hospital | Dr. Ken Martin | 1963–1964 |
| 1964 | Gunsmoke | Cowboy | Episode: "Scot Free" |
| 1964 | 12 O'Clock High | Lt. Kinner | Episode: "Decision" |
| 1965 | The Young Marrieds | Dr. Ken Martin | character from General Hospital |
| 1965–1967 | The F.B.I. | Allen Cole / Woods / Defense Attorney Barker | 3 episodes |
| 1966 | Sugar Colt | Dr. Tom Cooper / Rocco | |
| 1966 | The Man Who Never Was | | Episode: "To Kill an Albatross" |
| 1967 | Halleluja for Django | Santo / David Phaylard | |
| 1968 | One Life to Live | Dr. Ivan Kipling | TV series |
| 1969 | It Takes a Thief | Garrison | Episode: "Saturday Night in Venice" |
| 1970 | Quel maledetto giorno d'inverno... Django e Sartana all'ultimo sangue | Django | |
| 1970 | Django and Sartana Are Coming... It's the End | Django | |
| 1970 | Dead Men Don't Make Shadows | Lazar Peacock / Sabata | |
| 1971 | A Barrel Full of Dollars | Tamayo | |
| 1971 | Down with Your Hands... You Scum! | Django | |
| 1971 | Boulevard du Rhum | Renner | |
| 1971 | He Was Called Holy Ghost | Foster | |
| 1971 | A Fistful of Death | Butch Cassidy | |
| 1972 | The Assassination of Trotsky | Lou | |
| 1972 | A.A.A. Massaggiatrice bella presenza offresi | Enrico Graziani | |
| 1973 | Corte marziale | | |
| 1977 | Kojak | Paul Lawford | Episode: "The Condemned" |
| 1978 | Bye Bye Monkey | Bar Owner | Uncredited |
| 1978 | The Doctors | Hugh McCluskey | |
| 1978 | The Edge of Night | Dr. Stein | |
| 1982 | Another World | Louis St. George | 1 episode |
| 1983 | All My Children | Lars Bogard #3 | 1 episode |
| 1984 | Remington Steele | Walter Gallen | Episode: "Blood Is Thicker Than Steele" |
| 1984 | Falcon Crest | Dr. Roderick | Episode: "Little Boy Blue" |
| 1986 | Search for Tomorrow | Dr. David Glenn | Episode: "Finale" |
| 1987 | Guiding Light | Dr. Wilson Frost (1973–1974) / John Cutter | |
| 1988 | The Chair | Detective | |
| 1989 | Generations | Hugh Gardner | 3 episodes |
| 1990 | Dead Men Don't Die | Alex Cavanaugh | |
| 1991 | In the Heat of the Night | Attorney Mark Harris | Episode: "Unfinished Business" |
| 1992 | Sinatra | Earl Wilson | 2 episodes |
| 1992 | Just My Imagination | Governor | TV movie |
| 1992 | White Trash | CC's father | |
| 1993 | Falling Down | Frank (Golfer) | |
| 1993 | Marilyn & Bobby: Her Final Affair | Director | TV movie |
| 1993 | Sisters | Harry Busby | Episode: "A Kick in the Caboose" |
| 1993 | Fugitive Nights: Danger in the Desert | Doc Morton | TV movie |
| 1995 | Seinfeld | Mr. Green | Episode: "The Doorman" |
| 1995 | Batman Forever | Fisherman | |
| 1995 | MADtv | Judge | 1 episode |
| 1996 | Deadly Games | Gene Murdock | Episode: "Dr. Kramer" |
| 1996 | Power 98 | Waldo Marcel | |
| 1997 | The Big Fall | Tyre | |
| 1997 | Frasier | Ian | Episode: "Ham Radio" |
| 1997 | Batman & Robin | Party Guest #1 | |
| 1998 | Alien Avengers II | Elder | TV movie |
| 1997 | Mike Hammer, Private Eye | Father Dressler | Episode: "Sins of the Fathers" |
| 1998 | Gods and Monsters | Boris Karloff | |
| 1998 | The Scottish Tale | Syd | |
| 1999 | Southern Man | | |
| 1999 | Everybody Loves Raymond | Walter | Episode: "Cruising with Marie" |
| 1999 | Office Space | Judge | |
| 1999 | 8MM | Butler | |
| 1999 | Power Rangers Lost Galaxy | Councilor Brody | 7 episodes |
| 2000 | The Next Best Thing | Vernon | |
| 2000 | True Rights | Thad Whitney | |
| 2000 | Running Mates | Senator | TV movie |
| 2000 | Cut | Alfred Carpenter | TV Short, Uncredited |
| 2001 | Friends | Tom | Episode: "The One with Joey's New Brain" |
| 2001 | Mockingbird Don't Sing | Wes Standon | |
| 2001 | Critical Mass | Atty. Gen. Ames | |
| 2002 | The Young and the Restless | Roberto | 1 episode |
| 2002 | Spider-Man | Henry Balkan | |
| 2002 | The District | Priest | Episode: "Faith" |
| 2003 | The Commission | Allen Dulles | |
| 2004 | I Am Stamos | Preston | Short |
| 2004 | Vendetta: No Conscience, No Mercy | Jack McGuire | |
| 2005 | Cold Case | Dr. Greggs | Episode: "A Perfect Day" |
| 2006 | My Name Is Earl | Prosecutor | Episode: "BB" |
| 2007 | Zoey 101 | Mr. Hodges | Episode: "Curse of PCA" |
| 2007 | The Desert Rose | Joel Shaw | Show |
| 2007 | Being Michael Madsen | James J. Perry | |
| 2008 | It's a Wonderful Death | President Marshall | Short |
| 2009 | The Unit | Old Priest | Episode: "The Last Nazi" |
| 2009 | The Mentalist | Other Mobster | Episode: "Red Sauce" |
| 2009 | Monk | Cowboy Hank | Episode: "Happy Birthday, Mr. Monk" |
| 2011 | Mardi Gras: Spring Break | Elderly Couple | |
| 2014 | About Last Night | Old Man | |
| 2015 | To Dust Return | Mr. Owen | Short |
| 2016 | The Red Maple Leaf | Alfonso Palermo's LA Driver | |
| 2016 | Silver Skies | Mickey | |
| 2016 | JOB's Daughter | Sam Morrison | |
| 2017 | Garlic & Gunpowder | Bookstore Owner | |
| 2018 | D-Railed | The Conductor | |
