= Um Pistoleiro Chamado Papaco =

- Directed by: Mário Vaz Filho
- Screenplay by: Mário Vaz Filho
- Produced by: Iragildo Mariano
- Starring: Fernando Benini; Márcia Ferro; Chumbinho
- Cinematography: Antonio Meliande
- Production company: Olympus Filmes
- Release date: 22 September 1986
- Running time: 75 minutes
- Country: Brazil
- Language: Portuguese

Um Pistoleiro Chamado Papaco (lit. 'A Gunslinger Named Papaco'), also released as Os Amores de um Pistoleiro (lit. 'The Loves of a Gunslinger'), is a 1986 Brazilian Western pornochanchada film directed by Mário Vaz Filho and starring Fernando Benini as the gunslinger Papaco. The film was produced in Boca do Lixo, an area in the Central Zone of São Paulo that was a stronghold of Brazilian underground cinema. The film became an internet meme in Brazil.

== Synopsis ==
The gunslinger Papaco roams the West, dragging his coffin filled with precious merchandise (which is only revealed to the public at the end of the film) to negotiate with a group of outlaws in the town of Santa Cruz das Almas. Along the way, he encounters a man named Pancho Favela. Pancho challenges him, but Papaco easily defeats him, then proceeds to rape him. Papaco later meets Linda after dueling and killing her four husbands, and she asks to join him. Upon arriving in town, several gangs connected to the local crime bosses Jane and Sapato try to steal the merchandise in the coffin. After being taken in at the town brothel by the grave-digger, Papaco is overpowered by the dwarf Big Boy but finally manages to negotiate the trade of the goods.

== Cast ==
- Fernando Benini as Papaco
- Chumbinho as dwarf Big Boy
- Márcia Ferro as Linda
- Nikita as Jane
- Agnaldo Costa as Sapato
- Paco Sanchez as Pancho Favela
- Gustavo Antonho Perin as Bar Dwarf
- Satã (Melquíades França Netto) as Sartana
- Denise Clair as Saloon Prostitute
- Angelica Belmont as Saloon Prostitute
- Camila Gordon as Saloon Prostitute
- Priscila Presley as Saloon Prostitute
- Custódio Gomes as Jane's henchman

== Background and release ==
Um Pistoleiro Chamado Papaco was directed by Mário Vaz Filho and produced by Olympus Filmes in Boca do Lixo (lit. 'Garbage's Mouth'), an area in downtown São Paulo that became a hub for underground cinema during the 1960s and 1980s. Starting in 1981, the pornochanchada genre "bloomed one last time" by incorporating explicit sex scenes, which were then becoming permitted. Mário began directing films in 1982. Um Pistoleiro Chamado Papaco, a Brazilian Western, was "made as a satirical take" on the 1966 Italian film Django. According to journalist Matheus Trunk, Mário "was an intellectual type, so even in explicit content, he sought to use double entendres and humor". For example, instead of a machine gun, the gunslinger carried a collection of dildos in the coffin he dragged around. The film was released on September 22, 1986, in São Paulo and on November 3 in Rio de Janeiro. It was also released with the name Os Amores de um Pistoleiro.

== Reception and legacy ==
According to the Brazilian regulatory agency of cinema (Ancine), the film had 823.533 spectators. To O Globo, F.M.V. described Um Pistoleiro Chamado Papaco as a "porn salad drenched in explicit sex sauce", mixing "a spaghetti-western parody with a slab of pornographic comedy". He criticized the film, arguing that its "few less-contemptible ideas" were overshadowed by excessive sex scenes, "just like any other porno", despite the presence of a skilled cinematographer in the production. Jorge Coli, an art history professor at State University of Campinas, hailed the film as a "phenomenal spaghetti-western parody". Um Pistoleiro Chamado Papaco is Mário Vaz Filho's and Fernando Benini's most famous work, having spawned a comic book adaptation and becoming an internet meme, known for its crude jokes and dialogue packed with swear words.
