= Sergio Garrone =

Italian director, screenwriter and film producer (1925–2023)

- Born: 15 April 1925; Rome, Italy
- Died: 12 July 2023 (aged 98); Road Town, British Virgin Islands
- Occupation: Director
- Relatives: Riccardo Garrone (brother)

Sergio Garrone (15 April 1925 – 12 July 2023) was an Italian director, screenwriter and film producer.

== Life and career ==
Born in Rome, the brother of the actor Riccardo, Garrone began his career in 1948 working as assistant director, documentary filmmaker, and production assistant. In 1953, he abandoned the cinema industry, but in 1965 he resurfaced as a producer of low-budget genre films. Starting from 1968, Garrone was also active as a director and a screenwriter, specializing in the Spaghetti Western genre. He was usually credited as Willy S. Regan. Garrone died in July 2023, at the age of 98.

== Selected filmography ==
Director and screenwriter

- No Graves on Boot Hill (1968)
- A Noose for Django (1969)
- Django the Bastard (1969)
- La colomba non deve volare (1970)
- Kill Django... Kill First (1971)
- Terrible Day of the Big Gundown (1971)
- Lover of the Monster (1974)
- The Hand That Feeds the Dead (1974)
- SS Experiment Camp (1976)
- SS Camp 5: Women's Hell (1977)

Screenwriter

- Death Knocks Twice (1969)
- Five for Hell (1969)
- The Big Bust Out (1972)
- La pagella (1980)
