= Wild Desire =

- Directed by: Enver Burçkin
- Written by: Sacit Öget
- Produced by: Selahattin Burçkin
- Cinematography: Enver Burçkin
- Production company: Burç Film
- Release date: 1953
- Country: Turkey
- Language: Turkish

Wild Desire (Turkish: Vahşi Arzu) is a 1953 Turkish drama film directed by Enver Burçkin and starring Ayhan Işık, Mesiha Yelda and Ahmet Tarik Tekçe.

== Cast ==
- Ayhan Işık
- Mesiha Yelda
- Ahmet Tarik Tekçe
- Zeki Alpan

== Bibliography ==
- Türker İnanoğlu. 5555 afişle Türk Sineması. Kabalcı, 2004.
