= Django Kill... If You Live, Shoot! =

1967 film

- Italian theatrical poster
- Italian: Se sei vivo spara
- Directed by: Giulio Questi
- Screenplay by: Giulio Questi; Franco Arcalli; Benedetto Benedetti
- Story by: Maria Del Carmen; Martinez Roman; Giulio Questi; Franco Arcalli
- Produced by: Sandro Iacovoni
- Starring: Tomas Milian; Marilù Tolo; Roberto Camardiel; Piero Lulli; Milo Quesada; Ray Lovelock
- Cinematography: Franco Delli Colli
- Edited by: Franco Arcalli
- Music by: Ivan Vandor
- Production companies: G.I.A. – Società Cinematografica; Hispamer Filmi
- Distributed by: Titanus
- Release date: January 1967 (Italy)
- Running time: 117 minutes
- Countries: Italy; Spain
- Language: Italian

Django Kill... If You Live, Shoot! (Italian: Se sei vivo spara, lit. 'If You Live Shoot') is a 1967 spaghetti Western film directed by Giulio Questi and starring Tomas Milian, Marilù Tolo, Roberto Camardiel, and Ray Lovelock in his film debut.

== Plot ==
A pair of Indian medicine men encounter a wounded bandit, the Stranger, crawling out from a mass grave; they nurse him back to health. During his recovery, he remembers an assault on a Wells Fargo covered wagon guarded by US Army troops. The Stranger, his partner Oaks, and their gang killed the troops, caught swimming in a river, and stole a strongbox containing bags of powdered gold from the wagon. However, Oaks and the white members of the gang betrayed the Stranger and the Mexican bandits, and forced them to dig their grave before gunning them down. In the present, the Indians inform the Stranger that they have smelted his share of the gold into bullets, and that they wish to be his companions so that he can tell them about the happy hunting ground.

Oaks and his gang arrive in a nearby town (referred to by the Indians as "The Unhappy Place"), where they attempt to buy horses and food with their gold. Bill Templer, the saloon owner, recognises Oaks from a Wanted poster. Templer and Alderman, the town pastor, lead an armed mob in lynching all of the bandits except for Oaks, who barricades himself in a store. The Stranger arrives and shoots the frightened Oaks. Wounded, Oaks is operated on in the saloon, but is killed when the townspeople try to pull the gold bullets from his body. The Stranger spends the night in the saloon, haunted by what has transpired. Templer and Alderman argue over what shares of the bandits' gold they should receive; Flory, Templer's mistress, becomes aroused as she watches the proceedings. Templar's unstable son, Evan, destroys some of Flory's clothes in anger after seeing her watch the argument. Sorrow, an eccentric gay rancher, orders Templer to surrender the gold.

When the Stranger and the Indians cut down the hanging corpses of the bandits to bury them, they are ordered to leave town. While horse-hunting, the Stranger witnesses Evan being kidnapped and held hostage by Sorrow's "muchachos". They return to Sorrow's ranch, where he offers the Stranger work, throws a party and sends a messenger to town to inform Templer of the kidnapping. Templer lies and insists that Alderman has the gold. Sorrow orders Evan killed, but the Stranger saves his life via a drunken shooting game, and Sorrow allows him to live. Whiskey-sodden, the Stranger is unable to help Evan as he is surrounded by amorous muchachos. The next morning, while Sorrow, the Stranger and the other men sleep, Evan takes a gun and commits suicide.

The Stranger returns to town with Evan's body. Enraged by his death, he gets into a savage brawl with Templer and several locals. Knowing that Sorrow will have their saloon searched, Flory and Templer hide the gold in Evan's coffin. Alderman invites the Stranger to live with him, and encourages him to have an affair with Elizabeth, his half-mad wife who is kept locked up in her bedroom. As the Stranger and Elizabeth become attracted to each other, Alderman kills Templer with the Stranger's pistol, placing the blame on him. Flory, witnessing the murder, flees and tells the Stranger what has happened, and that the gold is now in the graveyard due to Evan's burial. Alderman leads the townspeople in a search for the Stranger, during which one of the Indians is scalped and Flory is shot dead by Alderman. Sorrow's muchachos capture the Stranger, crucify him and torture him with vampire bats; he confesses that the gold is in the cemetery. Sorrow's gang uproot the graveyard, but find that Alderman has already dug the gold up. The surviving Indian frees the Stranger, who kills Sorrow's men using a horse laden with dynamite, and shoots Sorrow in his boudoir.

The Stranger returns to town, where he finds that Alderman's house has been set on fire by a distraught Elizabeth. Alderman opens a cabinet to retrieve his gold; having turned molten, it smothers his hands and face. The Stranger and the townspeople watch as Elizabeth and Alderman, covered in boiling gold, die in the flames. Alone, the Stranger rides out of town, where he passes by two children using strings to distort their faces.

== Cast ==
- Tomas Milian as The Stranger
- Marilù Tolo as Flory
  - Ann Collin as Flory's singing voice (uncredited)
- Roberto Camardiel as Sorrow
- Paco Sanz as Alderman
- Milo Quesada as Bill Templer
- Piero Lulli as Oaks
- Ray Lovelock as Evan Templer
- Patrizia Valturri as Elizabeth Alderman
- Miguel Serrano as Indian
- Ángel Silva as Indian
- Félix Sancho Gracia as Willy
- Mirella Panfili as Townswoman

Uncredited

- Lars Bloch as Oaks' Henchman
- Frank Braña as Townsman
- Gene Collins as Collins
- Rafael Hernández as Richie
- Herman Reynoso as Townsman

== Style ==
Django Kill... If You Live, Shoot! was described by film historian Howard Hughes as "difficult to pigeonhole", noting it encompassed the Western, horror film, and splatter film genres, describing it as "the weirdest Italian made Western". It is well known for the surrealistic violence and for the psychedelic editing of Franco "Kim" Arcalli. Phil Hardy defines it as "the most brutally violent spaghetti western ever made". Describing the film, Christopher Frayling says that "the violence was of an extraordinarily savage kind". Antonio Bruschini writes that "this film is the first western to offer a sample of truly horrendous scenes". Marco Giusti referred to the film as the most violent and bizarre ever filmed in Italy. It has also been characterized as an acid Western.

Despite the fact that it has "Django" in its title, the film is unrelated to the Django series, and was just one of many spaghetti Westerns to incorporate the name into the title to cash-in on the success of the Franco Nero film.

== Release ==
Django Kill...If You Live, Shoot! was shown in Italy in January 1967 and was withdrawn from release within one week due to complaints from censorship boards. The film was then cut from its 117 minute running time to a 95 minute running time. The film was released as Oro Maldito in Spain and was reissued as Oro Hondo in an Italian re-issue and under the alternative name Gringo Uccidi! in Italy. The cut version was also released in UK and US in 1970 by Golden Era Film Distributors with the tagline "Terror from the Depths of Hell!".

== See also ==
- Straight to Hell: a 1987 film inspired by Django Kill... If You Live, Shoot!
