= The Lion Has Seven Heads =

1970 film directed by Glauber Rocha

- German poster
- Directed by: Glauber Rocha
- Written by: Glauber Rocha; Gianni Amico
- Produced by: Gianni Barcelloni; Claude-Antoine
- Starring: Rada Rassimov; Giulio Brogi; Gabriele Tinti; Jean-Pierre Léaud
- Cinematography: Guido Cosulich
- Edited by: Eduardo Escorel; Glauber Rocha
- Music by: Baden Powell
- Production companies: Polifilm; Claude Antoine Filmes; Mapa Filmes
- Distributed by: Animatógrafo
- Release date: 1970
- Running time: 103 minutes
- Countries: France; Italy; Brazil
- Language: Portuguese

The Lion Has Seven Heads (original title:Der Leone Have Sept Cabeças) is a 1970 French-Italian-Brazilian film directed by Glauber Rocha. It was shot on location in Brazzaville, the Congo during the time Rocha was exiled.

== Plot ==
In the late 1960s, a white preacher in Africa announces the world is due to end soon as he has captured an emissary of the devil. Rather than an emissary, the man is a Latin American revolutionary who supports the local liberation movement. The man escapes from the preacher and contacts a local liberation leader and offers him assistance in the local's fight against Imperialism.

== Cast ==
- Rada Rassimov as Marlene
- Giulio Brogi as Pablo
- Gabriele Tinti as American Agent
- Jean-Pierre Léaud as Preacher
- Reinhard Kolldehoff as Governor
- Aldo Bixio as Mercenary
- Baiack as Zumbi
- Hugo Carvana as Portuguese
- Pascal N'Zonzi

== Reception ==
Film critic Peter Bradshaw, in his 2023 review for The Guardian, rated the film 4 out of 5 stars, characterizing it as "an avant-gardist adventure that offers us a theatre of absurdity and a theatre of cruelty of an obviously Godardian sort." He compares Rocha's cinematic style to that of Jean-Luc Godard, noting Rocha's adeptness with composition and camera movement. Bradshaw critiques the film's portrayal of colonial themes, mentioning its use of the character Marlene as a symbol of colonial desire and the representation of Congolese locals, stating, "The use of the local people in this film is something else that jars a little now in its not-so-subtle condescension." Despite its flaws, he acknowledges the film's historical significance, noting its engagement with revolutionary ideas: "The Lion Has Seven Heads has its own fierce, mad conviction, a bad dream being reconstructed by actors after the event – and the film itself has historical value."
