= La visita =

1963 film

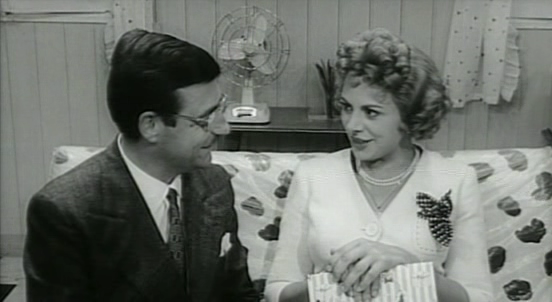
- Screenshot from the film
- Directed by: Antonio Pietrangeli
- Written by: Gino De Santis; Ettore Scola; Ruggero Maccari; Antonio Pietrangeli
- Produced by: Moris Ergas
- Starring: Sandra Milo
- Cinematography: Armando Nannuzzi
- Edited by: Eraldo Da Roma
- Music by: Armando Trovajoli
- Release date: 28 December 1963
- Running time: 100 minutes
- Countries: Italy; France
- Language: Italian

La visita is a 1963 Italian comedy film directed by Antonio Pietrangeli. It was entered into the 14th Berlin International Film Festival.

== Cast ==
- Sandra Milo - Pina
- François Périer - Adolfo Di Palma
- Mario Adorf - Cucaracha
- Gastone Moschin - Renato Gusso
- Angela Minervini - Chiaretta
- Ettore Baraldi
- Giancarlo Bellagamba
- Bruno Benatti
- Paola Del Bon
- Ferdinando Gerra
- Abele Reggiani
- Carla Vivian
- Didi Perego - Nella
