= Hate for Hate =

1967 film

- US film poster
- Directed by: Domenico Paolella
- Screenplay by: Mario Amendola; Bruno Corbucci; Fernando Di Leo; Domenico Paolella
- Produced by: Italo Zingarelli
- Starring: Antonio Sabàto; John Ireland; Mirko Ellis; Nadia Marconi; Gloria Milland; Piero Vida; Fernando Sancho
- Cinematography: Alejandro Ulloa; Giovanni Bergamini
- Edited by: Sergio Montanari
- Music by: Willy Brezza
- Production company: West Film
- Distributed by: Delta (Italy); Metro-Goldwyn-Mayer (International)
- Release date: August 18, 1967
- Country: Italy
- Language: Italian
- Box office: £711.1 million

Hate for Hate (Italian: Odio per odio) is a 1967 Italian Spaghetti Western film directed by Domenico Paolella.

== Plot ==
Digger Manuel has found enough gold to quit working. He is about to retire when robbers steal his fortune from him at the bank. Manuel pursues the bank robbers immediately, determined to get his gold back by all means. Unfortunately he is a little later confused with them and put into prison.

== Cast ==
- Antonio Sabàto as Manuel
- John Ireland as James Arthur Cooper
- Mirko Ellis as Morton
- Nadia Marconi as Jenny Cooper
- Gloria Milland as Maria Consuelo Cooper
- Piero Vida as Sorito
- Fernando Sancho as Coyote
- Gianni De Benedetto as Prison Doctor
- Alba Gallotti as Mrs. Driscoll
- Emilio Sancho as Hyena
- Antonio Irranzo as Fulton
- Mario De Simone as Fisherman
- Donato Baster as Stoney
- Sergio Scarchilli as Martinez
- Osvaldo Genazzani as Sheriff
- Bruno Ariè as Prison Guard
- Luigi Perelli as John Cooper
- César Ojinaga as Mendez
