= Erol Taş =

Turkish actor

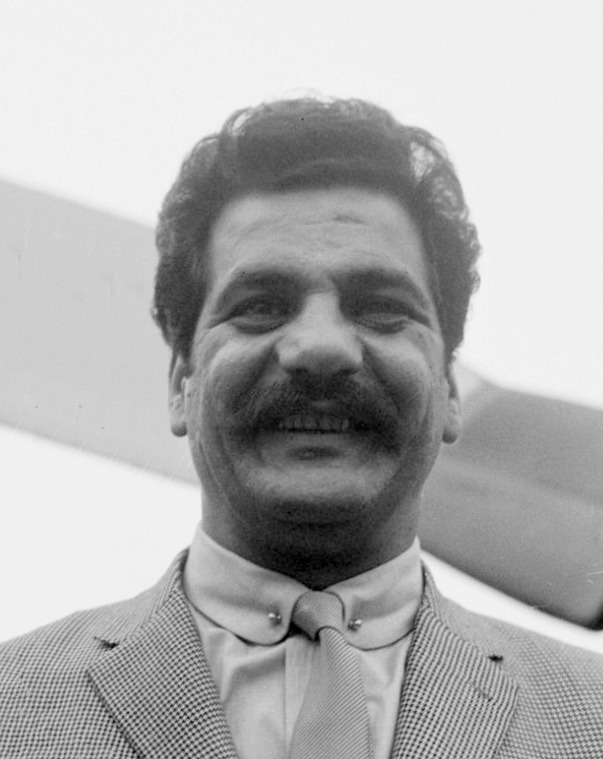
- Erol Taş in 1964
- Born: 28 February 1928; Erzurum, Turkey
- Died: 8 November 1998 (aged 70); Istanbul, Turkey
- Occupation: Actor
- Years active: 1945–1998
- Spouse(s): Hafize Taş (?–1965); Elmas Taş (1966–1998)
- Children: 4

Erol Taş (28 February 1928 – 8 November 1998) was a Turkish film actor. He appeared in 220 films between 1957 and 1998. He starred in the 1964 film Susuz Yaz, which won the Golden Bear at the 14th Berlin International Film Festival.

== Selected filmography ==
- Revenge of the Snakes - 1962
- Stranger in the City - 1962
- Susuz Yaz - 1964
- Beyond the Walls (Duvarların Ötesi) - 1964
- The Hand That Feeds the Dead - 1974
- Lover of the Monster - 1974
