= The Hand That Feeds the Dead =

1974 film

- Film poster
- Directed by: Sergio Garrone
- Screenplay by: Sergio Garrone
- Produced by: Amedeo Mellone; Sakir V. Sozen
- Starring: Klaus Kinski; Katia Christine; Ayhan Işık; Marzia Damon
- Cinematography: Emore Galeassi
- Edited by: Cesare Bianchini
- Music by: Elio Maestosi; Stefano Liberati
- Production company: Cinequipe
- Distributed by: Variety Distribution
- Release date: 29 April 1974 (Italy)
- Running time: 88 minutes
- Countries: Italy; Turkey

The Hand That Feeds the Dead (Italian: La mano che nutre la morte) is a 1974 Gothic horror film directed by Sergio Garrone and starring Klaus Kinski. In this film, a 19th-century doctor finds a laboratory in his basement and starts dabbling in reanimation.

== Cast ==
Although they are credited, Carla Mancini does not appear in the film. Ayhan Işık, Erol Taş and are not credited in Italian prints of the film.

- Klaus Kinski as Prof. Nijinski
- Katia Christine as Masha / Tanja Nijinski
- Ayhan Işık as Alex
- Caterina Chiani as Katja Olenov
- Erol Taş as Vanya

== Production ==
After directing the war film La colomba non deve volare, director Sergio Garrone began work on a horror film. After contacting the Italian distributor named Sabatini, he was introduced to the Rome-based Turkish producer Şakir V. Sözen. Sözen had previously produced Frank Agrama's crime film L'amico del padrino and offered the location of a huge villa and proposed casting the Turkish actor Ayhan Işık who had co-starred in L'amico del padrino. According to Garrone, Sözen suggested instead of making one film in six weeks, that they should make two films in eight weeks. This led to the production of both Le amanti del mostro and The Hand That Feeds the Dead.

Garrone described the general idea for the film as a variation on a "Frankenstein story" The film was shot in Istanbul and Elios Studios in Rome. The special effects for the surgical scenes in the film were provided by Carlo Rambaldi.

== Release ==
The Hand That Feeds the Dead was released in Italy on 29 April 1974. The Turkish version of the film was not released until 1986 after actor and producer Yilmaz Duru bought the negatives from Sözen and released it as Ölümün Nefesi (lit. 'Breath of Death'). Duru re-edited the film and added music by Arif Melikov. Ölümün Nefesi was released on home video for Turkish and German home video markets and broadcast on Turkish television. The Turkish version was shown at the 2001 Ankara Film Festival.
