= Mevlüt Kaplan =

Turkish writer (1930–2026)

Mevlüt Kaplan (20 June 1930 – 14 February 2026) was a Turkish writer, poet and educator, known primarily for his contributions to children's literature and educational publishing. His literary works encompassed poetry, short stories, novels, fairy tales and educational books, many of which were written for young readers.

Kaplan graduated from the İvriz Village Institute and later studied special education at the Gazi Institute of Education. During his career, he worked as a teacher, primary education inspector and educational specialist. He was among the founders of the Teachers' Union of Turkey (TÖS) and established the Özgür Eğitim publishing house in İzmir in 1964. His literary writing frequently drew on rural Anatolian life and educational themes.

== Early life and education ==
Mevlüt Kaplan was born on 20 June 1930 in Ökes, a village in the Akşehir district of Konya Province, Turkey. His father, Mehmet Kaplan, worked in construction, and his mother was Fadime Kaplan. Kaplan experienced a difficult childhood, losing his mother at the age of nine and two of his brothers shortly afterwards. He helped his father support the household and worked as an apprentice and a shepherd.

Kaplan completed the first three years of his primary education in his home village. To continue his schooling, he walked approximately five kilometres each way to a neighbouring village, including during the winter. According to biographical accounts, his father made him shoes from an automobile tyre to help him make the journey through the snow. In 1945, while attending the fourth grade, he was admitted to the İvriz Village Institute in Ereğli, Konya, where he continued his education.

Kaplan graduated from the İvriz Village Institute in 1948 and began working as a primary school teacher in villages around Akşehir. He subsequently studied at the Gazi Institute of Education in Ankara, graduating from its Department of Special Education in 1955.

During his early teaching career, his story Eşeğimiz ve Ben (Our Donkey and Me) was published in the Nasreddin Hoca newspaper, associated with the writer Tarık Buğra and his father. In 1953, Kaplan was prosecuted on allegations of communist propaganda in connection with the work, but was acquitted.

== Professional and literary life ==
Kaplan began his literary career in 1945 while studying at the İvriz Village Institute. His first published poem, "Yaylada", appeared in the Samsun-based literary magazine Yayla in 1946. His poems, stories and articles subsequently appeared in numerous Turkish newspapers and literary journals, including Ülkü, Erciyes, Edebiyat Dünyası, Kaynak, Yücel, İmece, Yeni Ufuklar and Cumhuriyet.

After graduating from the Gazi Institute of Education in 1955, Kaplan continued his professional development in Turkey and abroad. Between 1958 and 1962, he pursued studies in Germany and the United Kingdom, focusing on children's literature and educational practices. He graduated from Marylebone Language College in London in 1962 and worked at BBC Radio in London in 1963. During this period, he also shared his observations through BBC broadcasts and Cyprus Bayrak Radio.

Throughout his professional career, Kaplan worked as a primary school teacher in Konya and Akşehir, a primary education inspector in Mersin and Antalya, and an educational specialist in İzmir. In 1965, he was among the founders of the Teachers' Union of Turkey (TÖS), alongside Fakir Baykurt and 93 other educators. He later served in advisory and selection committee roles at the Turkish Ministry of Culture between 1996 and 2000. Kaplan retired from his educational career in 1981.

In 1964, Kaplan established Özgür Eğitim Yayınevi (Free Education Publishing House) in İzmir. Following his retirement in 1981, he continued his literary and publishing activities, producing books primarily intended for children and young readers.

Kaplan's literary output included children's stories, novels, poetry, fairy tales, folk narratives and educational books. His publications included adaptations of Nasreddin and Keloğlan stories, as well as collections of Anatolian folk tales and works addressing education and rural life.

In addition to his writing and publishing activities, Kaplan was a member of literary and educational organizations, including the Writers' Union of Turkey and the Association of Writers. In 1997, he established the Mevlüt Kaplan Literary Award, a literary writing competition bearing his name. In 2009, the municipality of Konak in İzmir named the street where he lived after him in recognition of his contributions to literature.

== Selected works ==
Kaplan published works in several literary genres, including poetry, novels, short stories, fairy tales and educational literature. His bibliography includes works written for children as well as studies on Turkish education, culture and literature.

=== Poetry ===
- Cıvıltı (1950)
- Anadolu Yankıları (1951)
- Ozanca (1952)
- Yaşama Sevinci (2002)

=== Novels ===
- Köylü Aşkı (1953)
- Yetim Bücür Osman (1958)
- Barış Ülkesi (1980)
- Tren Düdükleri (1994)
- Köyün Demircisi (1996)
- Kınalı Güvercin (2000)

=== Children's literature and short stories ===
- Seçme Türk Halk Masalları (1963)
- Keloğlan ile Delioğlan (1970)
- Telli Turna (1975)
- Yolun Öteki Ucu (1990)
- Serçeler Yakına Konar (1996)
- Yaşayan Anadolu Efsaneleri (2004)

=== Educational and cultural studies ===
- Çağdaş Eğitim ve Köy Enstitüleri (1993)
- Aydınlanma Devrimi ve Köy Enstitüleri (2002)

== Legacy ==
Kaplan authored 720 books, including six collections of poetry. His works include tales, memoirs, short stories, novels and poetry. He received d twelve prizes and awards for his poetry, short stories and criticism. Every year a literary competition and prize is offered in his name.

Kaplan's literary works frequently focused on rural Anatolian life, education and social issues. According to literary scholar Elif Aktaş, his children's literature was influenced by social realism, with an emphasis on realistic settings, accessible language and educational themes. Rather than relying primarily on fantasy, his stories often sought to introduce young readers to everyday life and social realities. His adaptations and collections also drew upon traditional Turkish folk literature, including stories about Nasreddin Hodja and Keloğlan, Anatolian folk tales, riddles and narratives related to the Turkish War of Independence.

Kaplan received his first recorded literary distinction in 1947, placing third in a poetry competition organized by the Bursa-based literary magazine Nilüfer. His contributions to children's literature and education were subsequently recognized by various literary and educational organizations. In 2009, the municipality of Konak in İzmir named the street where he lived after him in recognition of his literary contributions.

== Death ==
Kaplan died on 14 February 2026, at the age of 95.

== See also ==
- Mahmut Makal
