= Rada Rassimov =

Italian actress (born 1938)

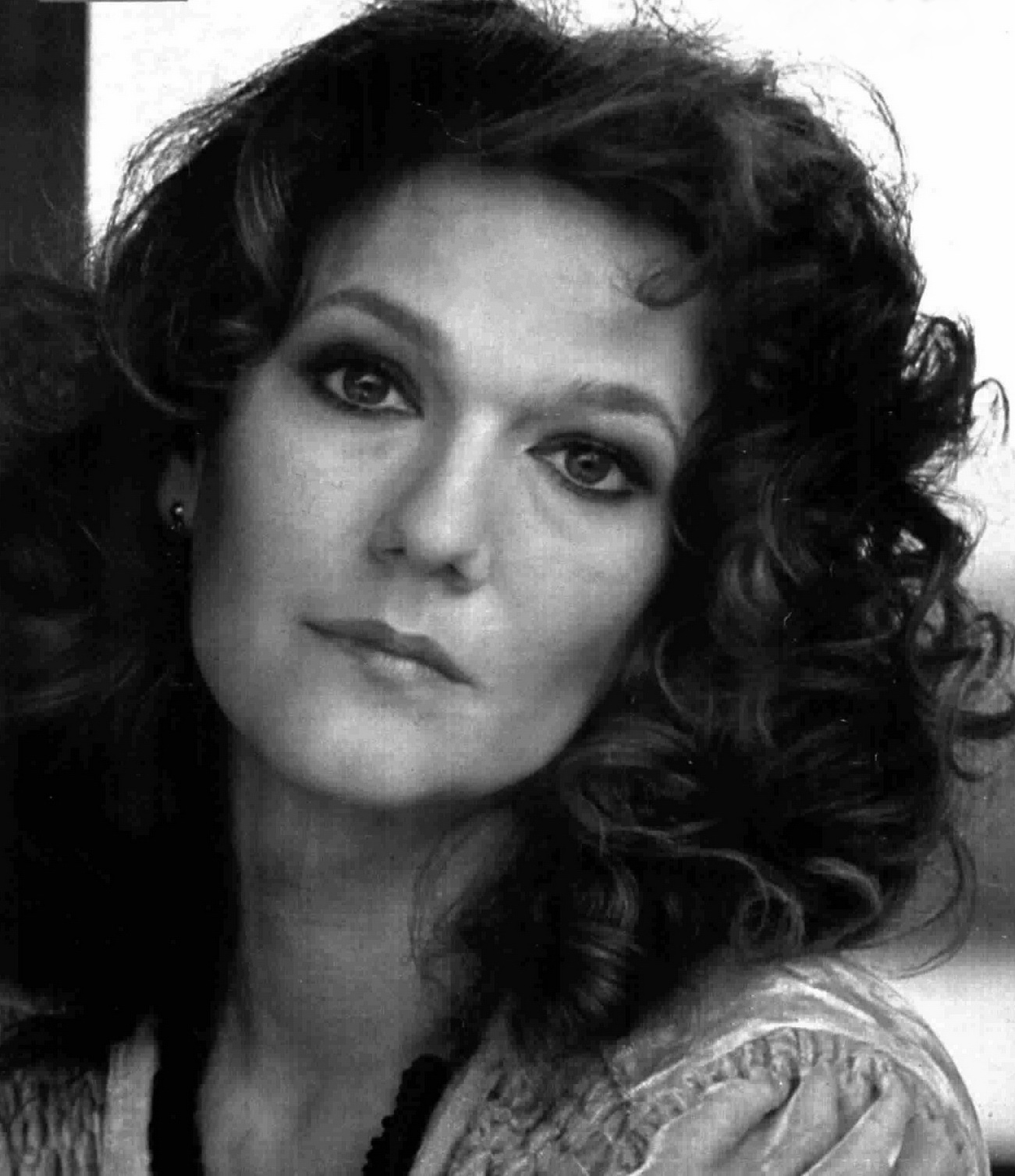
- Rassimov in 1975
- Born: 7 May 1938 (age 88)
- Occupation: Actress
- Years active: 1960s–present

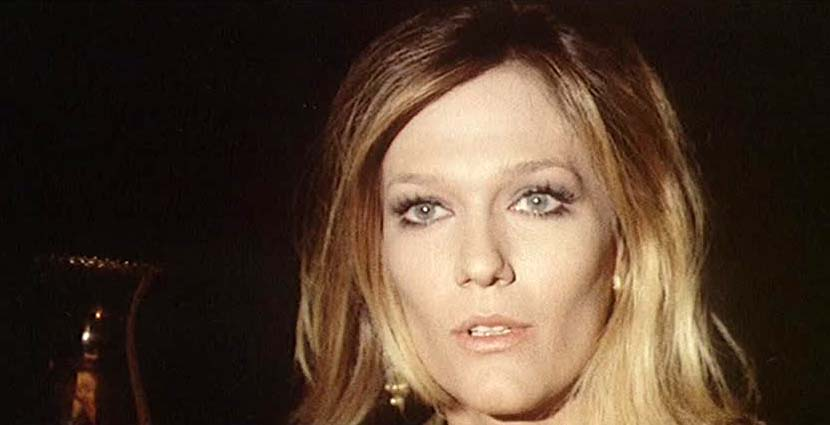
Rada Rassimov in Django the Bastard (1969)

Rada Rassimov (born 7 May 1938) is an Italian actress of Serb origin, who has appeared in film since the early 1960s and television since 1975. She's the sister of Ivan Rassimov.

== Filmography ==
- Una tragedia americana (1962, TV Mini-Series) – La signora Brent
- Sfida al re di Castiglia (1963) – Anna Coronel
- I maniaci (1964) – Rosetta, the French Teacher (segment "Il week-end")
- Per il gusto di uccidere (1966) – Isabelle
- The Good, the Bad and the Ugly (1966) – Maria
- Massacre Mania (1967) – Nicole Bouvier
- Non aspettare Django (1967) – Mary Foster
- Toufan bar farase Petra (1968)
- Gatling Gun (1968) – Mrs. Treble
- The Seed of Man (1969)
- Django the Bastard (1969) – Alethea / Alida Murdok
- The Seven Headed Lion (1970) – Marlene
- Necropolis (1970)
- The Cat o' Nine Tails (1971) – Bianca Merusi
- La grande scrofa nera (1971) – Anita
- A cuore freddo (1971) – Silvana0
- Die rote Kapelle (1973, TV Mini-Series) – Margarete Barcza
- Baron Blood (1972) – Christina Hoffmann
- Stregoni di città (1973)
- Kidnap (1974) – Marta
- Grandeur nature (1974) – Isabelle
- L'olandese scomparso (1974, TV mini-series) – Anne Magnolato
- Il tempo dell'inizio (1974)
- Witchcraft of the City (1974)
- Un uomo curioso (1975, TV movie) – Contessa Luisa
- Michel Strogoff (1975, TV mini-series) – Sangarre
- Processo a Maria Tarnowska (1977, TV mini-series) – Maria Tarnowska
- Hungarian Rhapsody (1979)
- Allegro barbaro (1979)
- Bel Ami (1979, TV Mini-Series) – Madeleine Forestier
- Orient-Express (1982, TV mini-series) – Wanda
- Mein Bruder und ich (1982, TV movie) – Elvira Fioretti
- Quartetto Basileus (1983) – Madame Finkal
- La freccia nel fianco (1983, TV Mini-Series)
- Un caso d'incoscienza (1984, TV movie)
- The Third Solution (1988)
- Gli angeli del potere (1988, TV movie)
- Lost Love (2003) – Clara Pasini (final film role)
