= Fakir Baykurt =

Turkish Novelist

- Fakir Baykurt
- Born: Tahir Baykurt; June 15, 1929; Yeşilova, Burdur, Turkey
- Died: October 11, 1999 (aged 70); Essen, Germany
- Occupations: Poet, novelist and trade unionist

Fakir Baykurt or born Tahir Baykurt (15 June 1929 – 11 October 1999) was a Turkish author and trade unionist.

== Early life ==
Fakir Baykurt was born Tahir on 15 June 1929, son of Elif and Veli Baykurt, in Akçaköy which is a district of Burdur, Turkey. His birth date is not known accurately however he pointed out that he was born in middle of June, 1929 by his mothers memoirs. His family gave him name of his uncle Tahir who died in battle. Tahir enrolled at Akçaköy Primary School in 1936 and lost his father just two years later. After his father's death, Tahir moved to Burhaniye, Bursa by aid of his uncle Osman Erdoğuş in purpose of earning money by textile works. During World War II, his uncle Osman joined Turkish army and that event helps Tahir to continue his education freely. 1942 was a year Tahir began to writing poems when he was deeply malaria ill.

After graduation from primary school, he enrolled at a village institute in Gönen, Isparta . During his institute days he focused on poetry and had a chance to read many books. On village institutes, he said: "Village Institute was huge chance for me. I was not able to enter any high school after graduation from primary school, my family couldn't afford. Village institutes were attracting students in the villages who have own wish for high education like me." In these years, Tahir read poems of Nazım Hikmet, a leftist poet and novelist who is under arrest at that time, he had to read most of these poems in privacy due to political pressure on communists in Turkey.

== Literary career ==
His first published poem Fesleğen Kokulum (My Basil-Scented) took place in a local journal Türke Doğru. In 1947, Tahir used Fakir Baykurt as pen name first time, his pen name Fakir is known more than his real name Tahir among Turkish literature society. One year later Fakir graduated from village institute and he was assigned to Kavacık Village, which is near by Fakir's native hometown, as teacher. During his career, he met poets and authors several times. In 1951 he married Muzaffer, he was appointed to Dereköy and his home was investigated under prosecution process. Two years later Fakir entered Turkish Literature Department of Gazi Faculty of Education. Fakir is judged next year due to some of his writings in Gayret journal. In 1955 he graduated from Gazi Faculty of Education, his first book Çilli (Freckled Face) was published.

In 1957 he was conscripted, his daughter Işık was born, a year later, Fakir won Yunus Nadi Novel Award by his first published novel Yılanların Öcü (Revenge of the Snakes). However he and committee of the Yunus Nadi Award were prosecuted due to this decision. After this prosecution, Fakir began writing for Cumhuriyet which is a secular and republican Turkish daily newspaper. Fakir was unseated by virtue of his articles in Cumhuriyet, after removal of authoritarian Democrat Party by succeeded coup d'état, Fakir had chance to get back on task; he was assigned to Education Inspector of Primary Schools in Ankara and his book Efkar Tepesi (Hill of Pensiveness) was published.

== Political struggles ==
After disappearance of political oppression on leftists in Turkey by 1960 coup d'état, Fakir's first novel Yılanların Öcü was made into a 1962 movie directed by Metin Erksan and adapted into a theatrical play. Although the film was banned at first due to its critical features, it was released again by influence of President Cemal Gürsel. His novels Onuncu Köy (Tenth Village), Karın Ağrısı (The Stomach Pain), Irazca'nın Dirliği (Irazca's Peace) were published at this period. Baykurt had training about aesthetical act of writing and education skills in Indiana University Bloomington. In 1963, his son Tonguç was born, Baykurt returned to Turkey and he resumed inspectorship duty in Ankara. Just a year later Yılanların Öcü was translated into German and Russian whilst Irazca'nın Dirliği was translated into Bulgarian. In 1965, Baykurt was one of members who established Teachers Union of Turkey; he was elected chairman of this union. Baykurt visited Bulgaria and Hungary under the title of chairman of the union. He was unseated from Education Inspector duty in consequence of his efforts in union.

His novels Amerikan Sargısı (American Wrap) and Kaplumbağalar (Turtles) were published in 1967, it was the same year that his novel Onuncu Köy was translated into Russian. Baykurt was prosecuted and exiled to Fevzipaşa which is a small town in eastern Turkey due to his unionist activities and articles in some journals although his determinedness on resuming activities in union. In 1969 he was unseated but one year later he got back on task by state council decisions. At the same time his books Anadolu Garajı (Anatolia Garage) and Tırpan (The Swath) were published. Baykurt won TRT literature award by his novels Sınırdaki Ölü and Tırpan. During military memorandum, Baykurt was arrested twice and judged in court-martial. In 1973 Baykurt was imposed a ban on leaving the country. His books On Binlerce Kağnı (Tens of Thousands Tumbrels), Can Parası, Köygöçüren (The Village Destroyer), Keklik (The Partridge) and İçerdeki Oğul (The Boy in Prison) were published in these years. In 1975 Baykurt was acquitted from Teachers Union of Turkey case at military court.

== Works ==
(source)

=== Novels ===
- Yılanların Öcü (1954)
- Irazcanın Dirliği (1961)
- Onuncu Köy (1961)
- Amerikan Sargısı (1967)
- Tırpan (1970)
- Köygöçüren (1973)
- Keklik (1975)
- Kara Ahmet Destanı (1977)
- Yayla (1977)
- Kaplumbağalar (1980)
- Yüksek Fırınlar (1983)
- Koca Ren (1986)
- Yarım Ekmek (1997)

=== Short stories ===
- Çilli (1955)
- Efendilik Savaşı (1959)
- Karın Ağrısı (1961)
- Cüce Muhammad (1964)
- Anadolu Garajı (1970)
- On Binlerce Kağnı (1971)
- Can Parası (1973)
- İçerdeki Oğul (1974)
- Sınırdaki Ölü (1975)
- Gece Vardiyası (1982)
- Barış Çöreği (1982)
- Duisburg Treni (1986)
- Bizim İnce Kızlar (1992)
- Dikenli Tel (1998)

=== Social commentary ===
- Efkar Tepesi (1960)
- Şamaroğlanları (1976)
- Kerem ile Aslı (1974)
- Kale Kale (1978)
- Kaplumbağalar (1980)

=== Children’s stories ===
- Topal Arkadaş
- Yandım Ali
- Sakarca
- Sarı Köpek
- Dünya Güzeli (1985)
- Saka Kuşları (1985)

=== Poetry ===
- Bir Uzun Yol
- Dostluga Akan Şiirler

== See also ==
- Mevlüt Kaplan
- Mahmut Makal
