= Django, Prepare a Coffin =

1967 Italian Spaghetti Western film by Ferdinando Baldi

- Italian film poster
- Directed by: Ferdinando Baldi
- Screenplay by: Franco Rossetti; Ferdinando Baldi
- Story by: Franco Rossetti
- Produced by: Manolo Bolognini
- Starring: Terence Hill; Horst Frank; George Eastman; Pinuccio Ardia; Guido Lollobrigida; José Torrès
- Cinematography: Enzo Barboni
- Edited by: Eugenio Alabiso
- Music by: Gian Franco Reverberi; Gian Piero Reverberi
- Production company: B.R.C. Produzione Film
- Distributed by: Titanus Distribuzione
- Release date: 27 January 1968
- Running time: 92 minutes
- Country: Italy
- Language: Italian

Django, Prepare a Coffin (Italian: Preparati la bara!, lit. 'Prepare Your Coffin!'), alternatively titled Viva Django, is a 1968 Italian spaghetti Western film directed by Ferdinando Baldi. The film was produced by Manolo Bolognini, who also produced Sergio Corbucci's original film. The film stars Terence Hill in the title role, which was previously played by Franco Nero. Originally Nero was intended to star.

Django, Prepare a Coffin was released in Italy by Titanus Distribuzione on 27 January 1968. It was shown as part of a retrospective on Spaghetti Western at the 64th Venice International Film Festival.

== Plot ==
Django is wounded and his wife is killed when the gold transport that he guards is attacked by the men of his "friend" David Barry, who wants the gold to finance a political career.

Django pretends to be dead and starts working as a hangman, who spares the lives of the condemned victims of David Barry's conspiracies. He organizes them in a band to "haunt" the perjurers that sent them to the gallows. This is part of a plan to disclose Barry and bring him to justice. The "hanged" are supposed to intercept an attack on a gold transport and capture Barry's men to get evidence, but Garcia - who earlier has saved Django's life during a fight within the group - convinces the rest of the men that instead they should take the gold for themselves. Garcia then kills the others.

Django saves Garcia's wife from hanging, and she then saves Django after Barry has captured him. Garcia regrets his treachery, which he explains by the fact that he is poor, and helps Django lure Barry to the graveyard, where Django digs up his own coffin and then kills Barry and his gang with the machine gun kept in the coffin. Garcia dies in the fight. Django leaves a sack of gold to Garcia's wife "for you and the children" before he leaves.

== Cast ==
- Terence Hill as Django
- Horst Frank as David Barry
- George Eastman as Lucas
- José Torrès as Garcia Ibáñez
- Bruna Simionato as Mercedes Ibáñez
- Pinuccio Ardia as Orazio ('Horace' in the English dub)
- Guido Lollobrigida as Jonathan Abbott
- Luciano Rossi as Jack "Yankee Jack"
- Gianni Brezza as Alvarez
- Giovanni Ivan Scratuglia as Pat O'Connor
- Roberto Simmi as Wallace
- Franco Balducci as Sheriff Jack
- Adriana Giuffrè as Mrs. Yankee Jack
- Angela Minervini as Lucy Cassidy
- Giovanni Di Benedetto as Walcott
- Andrea Scotti as Lucas Henchman
- Lucio De Santis and Spartaco Conversi as Django Gang Members

== Music ==
The film's score was composed by brothers Gian Franco and Gian Piero Reverberi. The film's title song, "You'd Better Smile", is performed by Nicola Di Bari.

The score cue "Last Man Standing" was notably sampled in the song "Crazy" by American soul duo Gnarls Barkley.

== Critical reception ==
In his investigation of narrative structures in Spaghetti Western films, Fridlund suggests that though Django, Prepare a Coffin is basically a story of vindication and retribution, the relationship between Django and Garcia shows some affinity with the Gringo specialist/social bandit pair in "political" spaghetti westerns like The Mercenary.

== Restoration ==
Django, Prepare a Coffin was restored at L'Immagine Ritrovata in Bologna. The film was transferred at 2K resolution with Arriscan from a 35mm interpositive print. Django, Prepare a Coffin was digitally restored in high definition and then digitally colour corrected with Film Master by Nucoda. The sound was digitalised using the Chace Optical Sound Precessor from the original soundtrack negative. The restored high definition edition of Django, Prepare a Coffin made its Blu-ray debut in June 2013 from the United Kingdom's Arrow Video.
