= Kill Django... Kill First =

1971 film

- Directed by: Sergio Garrone
- Written by: Palmambrogio Molteni
- Starring: Aldo Sambrell; Krista Nell
- Release date: 1971
- Country: Italy
- Language: Italian

Kill Django... Kill First (Italian: Uccidi Django... uccidi per primo!!!) is a 1971 Spaghetti Western directed by Sergio Garrone.

== Plot ==
Johnny befriends an old prospector in a small western gold town. Johnny fights the corrupted banker Burton and his gang of killers on behalf of the old prospector to protect his claim.

== Cast ==
- Giacomo Rossi Stuart as Johnny
- Kristanell Doris as Molly
- Aldo Sambrell as Burton / Manuel Santana
- George Wang as Lupe Martinez
- Silvio Bagolini as Thomas Livingstone
- Mario Novelli as Skin
- Diana Loris as Julie
- John Benedy as Bearded Burton Lieutenant
- Furio Meniconi as Sheriff
- Umberto Di Grazia as McGreen Brother
- Vittorio Fanfoni as Bill Adams
- Lorenzo Piani as Steve Adams
- Romano Peppino as "Curly"
- Ricca Andrea
- Lilio Beato
- Isarco Ravaioli as Doc
- Laila Shed as Evelyn McGreen
- Lorenzo Robledo as Bill McGreen
- Antonio Jiménez Escribano as Village Elder
- Francisco Bonmatí as Villager
