= One Damned Day at Dawn... Django Meets Sartana! =

1970 film

One Damned Day at Dawn… Django Meets Sartana!
- Directed by: Demofilo Fidani
- Screenplay by: M. Deem; Maria Rosa Vitelli Valenza
- Story by: Demofilo Fidani
- Starring: Hunt Powers; Fabio Testi; Dino Strano; Benito Pacifici
- Cinematography: Franco Villa
- Edited by: Piera Bruni
- Music by: Coriolano Gori
- Production company: Tarquinia Film
- Distributed by: Indipendenti Regionali
- Release date: 1970
- Country: Italy

One Damned Day at Dawn… Django Meets Sartana! (Italian: Quel maledetto giorno d'inverno... Django e Sartana all'ultimo sangue, "That Cursed Winter Day: Django and Sartana to the Death") is a 1970 Spaghetti Western directed by Demofilo Fidani.

== Plot ==
Django, a gunfighter, teams up with another gunfighter named Sartana to wipe out a gang of gun-runners that have been terrorizing the citizens of Black City.

== Release ==
One Damned Day at Dawn… Django Meets Sartana! was released in 1970. The film is not an official part of either the Django or Sartana series and along with Pasquale Squitieri's Django Defies Sartana and Demofilo Fidani's and Diego Spataro's Django and Sartana Are Coming... It's the End, was among three of the unofficial Django and Sartana films released in 1970.

== Reception ==
In a retrospective review, Howard Hughes wrote in his book Cinema Italiana that One Damned Day at Dawn...Django Meets Sartana! was "a plotless meander made on the cheap in familiar Lazio quarries." and stated that "Fidani's westerns, particularly [this film], are notable for their stunt performer's twitching deaths, which more closely resemble electrocution or gymnastics" and finally compared the director to Ed Wood, stating that Fidani's film titles were always more imaginative than the bargain-basement films they publicise.
