= Django and Sartana Are Coming... It's the End =

- Directed by: Demofilo Fidani; Diego Spataro
- Starring: Jack Betts; Franco Borelli; Gordon Mitchell; Krista Nell
- Release date: 1970
- Country: Italy
- Language: Italian

Django and Sartana Are Coming... It's the End (Italian: Arrivano Django e Sartana... è la fine) is a 1970 Spaghetti Western directed by Demofilo Fidani and/or Diego Spataro.

== Plot ==
A pack of outlaws led by Black Burt Keller kidnap Jessica Colby and flee to Mexico. Bounty hunter Django and gunslinger Sartana join forces to rescue her.

== Release ==
Django and Sartana Are Coming... It's the End was released in 1970. The film is not an official part of either the Django or Sartana series and along with Demofilo Fidani's One Damned Day at Dawn… Django Meets Sartana! and Pasquale Squitieri's Django Defies Sartana, was among three of the unofficial Django and Sartana films released in 1970.
