= Revenge of the Snakes =

Yılanların öcü
- Directed by: Metin Erksan
- Written by: Fakir Baykurt (novel), Metin Erksan (script)
- Produced by: Nusret Ikbal
- Starring: Fikret Hakan; Nurhan Nur; Aliye Rona; Erol Taş; Kadir Savun; Ali Şen; Sadiye Arcıman; T. Fikret Uçak; Hakki Haktan
- Cinematography: Mengü Yegin
- Music by: Yalçin Tura
- Distributed by: Be-Ya Film
- Release date: 24 January 1962
- Country: Turkey
- Language: Turkish

Revenge of the Snakes (Turkish language: Yılanların öcü) is a 1962 Turkish realist drama film directed by Metin Erksan and based on a novel by Fakir Baykurt. The film covers issues of an unwanted pregnancy in a small farming village and addressed numerous moral and social issues. The film was remade in 1985, starring Fatma Girik and Kadir İnanır. The TV series was remade in 2014 and was played by Ceyda Ateş, Hande Soral.

== Cast ==
- Fikret Hakan as Kara Bayram
- Nurhan Nur as Hatçe
- Aliye Rona as Irazca
- Erol Taş as Haceli
- Kadir Savun as Ak Ali
- Ali Sen as The headman
- Sadiye Arcıman as Fatma
- T. Fikret Uçak
- Hakki Haktan
