= Pre-certification video =

A pre-certification video is any videotape or laserdisc issued in the UK before the introduction of the 1984 Video Recordings Act.

Pre-certification videos were not required by law to be submitted to the BBFC so the era was unregulated, leading to many uncut releases of videos which would have fallen foul of the BBFC's strict guidelines, and would therefore have been censored if submission to the board was a legal requirement. However, while many of the larger respectable companies simply issued their previously BBFC certificated cinema releases onto video to play safe as they feared there was bound to be a clampdown at some stage, some of the smaller independent companies decided to take advantage of the unregulated video rentals market by issuing "strong uncut" versions depicting graphic violence. A whole barrage of titles previously banned by the BBFC from getting a cinema release suddenly ended up uncensored on home video.

What began as a bill drafted by little known Luton South Conservative back bencher Graham Bright was made law after he and the tabloid press (most notably The Daily Mail) had successfully whipped the media into a frenzied hysteria over so-called "video nasties". "Ban the Sadist Videos!" was one of the more famous headlines they ran. When the bill was made law, it became a legal requirement that all videotapes must be submitted to the BBFC for classification and possible cuts.

The pre-certification video era is best remembered, amongst horror fans in particular, for the ensuing "video nasty" debacle in which a selection of 72 videotapes were singled out and prosecuted by the Director of Public Prosecutions (DPP) under Section 2 or Section 3 of the Obscene Publications Act (OPA). Of these, 39 titles were deemed by the courts to be obscene and it is those titles which formed the final "Video Nasties" list.

Video releases from this unregulated pre-certification era have become increasingly collectible items. While most can be picked up cheaply on eBay and through second hand stores and car boot sales, many titles are highly sought after. In fact some of the very hard to find titles have been known to command prices in excess of £500. There remains to this day a very dedicated pre-cert collector's market.

== Introduction of legislation ==
In 1984, the UK government introduced the Video Recordings Act, which effectively meant that all pre-recorded videocassettes had to be officially classified by an independent body called the BBFC (British Board of Film Classification) before they could legally be released in the United Kingdom. There were some exceptions to this, such as music, educational, documentary and religious programmes providing they contained no profanity, sexual or violent content. These could be released with an Exempt status. Everything else had to be classified - and the costs of getting a cassette classified were considerable.

Before the VRA (Video Recordings Act) came into force, videos were not subject to classification, certification or censorship by any official means (although some companies chose to implement their own, and of course the Obscene Publications Act (1959) meant hardcore pornography would have been swiftly and severely dealt with (at least if it was on ready display).

The Video Recordings Act left uncertified titles in limbo, and unless a distributor acquires them and releases them with a BBFC classification, all titles fall under sections 9 and 10, which state:-

Section 9 - Supplying video recording of unclassified work.

(1) A person who supplies or offers to supply a video recording containing a video work in respect of which no classification certificate has been issued is guilty of an offence unless —

(a) the supply is, or would be if it took place, an exempted supply,

or (b) the video work is an exempted work.

(2) It is a defence to a charge of committing an offence under this section to prove that the accused believed on reasonable grounds —

(a) that the video work concerned or, if the video recording contained more than one work to which the charge relates, each of those works was either an exempted work or a work in respect of which a classification certificate had been issued, or

(b) that the supply was, or would if it took place be, an exempted supply by virtue of section 3(4) or (5) of this Act.

(3) A person guilty of an offence under this section shall be liable —

(a) on conviction on indictment, to imprisonment for a term not exceeding two years or a fine or both,

(b) on summary conviction, to imprisonment for a term not exceeding six months or a fine not exceeding £20,000 or both.

Section 10 Possession of video recording of unclassified work for the purposes of supply.

(1) Where a video recording contains a video work in respect of which no classification certificate has been issued, a person who has the recording in his possession for the purpose of supplying it is guilty of an offence unless —

(a) he has it in his possession for the purpose only of a supply which, if it took place, would be an exempted supply, or

(b) the video work is an exempted work

These years, from about 1978 until the classifications finally took hold good and proper in late 1985, became known as the pre-certification years.
