= Rough Justice (film) =

1970 film

- Film poster
- Directed by: Mario Costa
- Written by: Mario Costa
- Produced by: Paolo Prestano
- Starring: Klaus Kinski
- Cinematography: Luciano Trasatti
- Edited by: Nella Nannuzzi
- Music by: Stelvio Cipriani
- Release date: 12 September 1970
- Running time: 90 minutes
- Country: Italy
- Language: Italian

Rough Justice (Italian: La belva) is a 1970 Italian Western film directed by Mario Costa and starring Klaus Kinski.

== Cast ==
- Klaus Kinski - Johnny Laster
- Gabriella Giorgelli - Juanita
- Steven Tedd - Riccardo
- Giovanni Pallavicino - Machete
- Andrea Aureli - Riccardo's Father
- Remo Capitani
- Giuliano Raffaelli - Gary Pinkerton
- Paolo Casella - Glen (as Paul Sullivan)
- Grazia Di Marzà
- Fiona Florence
- Gioia Garson
- Cristina Iosani - (as Cristina Josani)
- Vittorio Mangano
- Ivana Novak
- Pilù
- Guido Lollobrigida - Logan (as Lee Burton)
- Luisa Rivelli
- Antonio Anelli
- Bruno Arié
- Bruno Boschetti
- Carla Mancini
- Sergio Scarchilli
