= A Noose for Django =

1969 film

- Directed by: Sergio Garrone
- Written by: Sergio Garrone
- Produced by: Gabriele Crisanti
- Starring: Anthony Steffen
- Cinematography: Franco Villa
- Edited by: Cesare Bianchini; Marcello Malvestito
- Music by: Vasco Vassilli
- Release date: 18 April 1969
- Running time: 97 min.
- Country: Italy
- Languages: Italian; English (dub)

A Noose for Django (Italian: Una lunga fila di croci, also known as No Room to Die and Hanging for Django) is a 1969 Italian spaghetti Western film directed by Sergio Garrone.

It was shown as part of a retrospective on Spaghetti Westerns at the 64th Venice International Film Festival.

== Plot summary ==
A pair of bounty hunters team up to hunt down an outlaw gang that has been sneaking illegal immigrants over the border to sell as slaves.

== Cast ==
- Anthony Steffen as Johnny Brandon
- William Berger as Everett Murdock
- Nicoletta Machiavelli as Maya
- Mario Brega as Brandon's Partner
- Riccardo Garrone as Mr. Fargo
- Mariangela Giordano as José's Wife
- Giancarlo Sisti as Buck Sullivan
- Franco Ukmar as Captain Stofer
