= Django the Bastard =

1969 Western film

- Original film poster
- Directed by: Sergio Garrone
- Screenplay by: Sergio Garrone Anthony Steffen as Antonio De Teffè
- Story by: Sergio Garrone; Antonio De Teffè
- Produced by: Pino de Martino
- Starring: Anthony Steffen; Paolo Gozlino; Lu Kamante; Rada Rassimov
- Cinematography: Gino Santini
- Edited by: Cesare Bianchini
- Music by: Vasco Mancuso
- Production companies: S.E.P.A.C. - Società Europea Produzioni Associate Cinematographica; Tigielle 33
- Distributed by: P.A.C. (Produzione Atlas Associate)
- Release date: 1969
- Running time: 107 minutes
- Country: Italy
- Language: Italian

Django the Bastard (Italian: Django il bastardo) is a 1969 Italian Gothic Spaghetti Western film directed by Sergio Garrone who co-wrote the film with the star Anthony Steffen. In 1974 Herman Cohen released an edited American version of the film called The Stranger's Gundown.

== Plot ==
A mysterious, vengeful stranger rides into town and creates all sorts of havoc. It seems there are a number of people on his list and before he metes out justice to each one, he places a cross with that person's name on it in the middle of the street. The burning question becomes whether these people are dealing with a one-man army of flesh and blood or an avenging angel of death. The answer may lie in the betrayal and massacre of a Confederate Army unit during the Civil War...

== Cast ==
- Anthony Steffen as Django
- Paolo Gozlino as Rod Murdok
- Lu Kamante as Jack Murdock
- Rada Rassimov as Alida Murdock
- Teodoro Corrà as Williams
- Jean Louis as Howard Ross
- Fred Robsahm as Sam Hawkins
- Ennio Balbo as Storekeeper

== Release ==
Django the Bastard was first released in 1969.

VCI Entertainment released the English dubbed version on DVD during 2002 in both full and widescreen formats under its U.S. title The Strangers Gundown. This product is currently out of print (OOP).

The film was re-released on 18 September 2015 in the United States under its original title Django il Bastardo from RetroVision Entertainment LLC, as a double bill with Boot Hill. It features both English and Italian dubs.

== See also ==
- Django (character)
- List of Italian films of 1969
