= 45th Saturn Awards =

2019 science fiction, fantasy, and horror awards ceremony

- Date: September 13, 2019
- Site: Avalon Hollywood, Hollywood, California, U.S.
- Hosted by: Aisha Tyler

Highlights
- Most awards: Film: Avengers: Endgame (6); Television: Game of Thrones (4); Streaming Television: Star Trek: Discovery (3)
- Most nominations: Film: Avengers: Endgame (14); Television: Game of Thrones (9); Streaming Television: The Haunting of Hill House (6)

The 45th Saturn Awards, presented by the Academy of Science Fiction, Fantasy and Horror Films and honoring the best in science fiction, fantasy, horror, and other genres belonging to genre fiction in film, television, home entertainment, and local stage production from March 1, 2018, to July 7, 2019, were held on September 13, 2019, in Avalon Hollywood, and hosted by actress and comedian Aisha Tyler. Nominations were announced on July 15, 2019.

The ceremony notably marked considerable changes for the Saturn Awards; although the awards had rewarded solely works from the previous year until 2016 – when the eligibility was changed to works released from March of the previous year to February of the current year, the eligibility was, for this ceremony, extended to March of the previous year to early July of the current year. It is also the first Saturn Awards ceremony not to be held in Burbank, California (since 2008), and the second to air live after the 1978 ceremony (as the show was made available for livestream on several platforms). It also marked major changes for the award categories; most notably, series were split into two different sets of categories ("Television" / "Streaming") for streaming television series released on streaming media/video on demand services such as Netflix or Hulu (films released on those platforms were also eligible for the acting categories).

The number of Best Series awards for streaming (previously limited to Best New Media Television Series and Best New Media Superhero Series) extended; although they had previously shared acting categories with traditional television, streaming series also now get their own. However, certain categories for television were not present for streaming, or have been fused into one, resulting in seven categories compared to twelve for traditional television. Additionally, the Legion M Breakout Director Award, rewarding first-time film directors, was introduced and handed out this year; Ari Aster won for the psychological supernatural horror film Hereditary (2018). Conversely, Best Television Presentation, given out since 1995, was discontinued; however, the award was revived the following ceremony under a new title—Best Television Presentation (under 10 Episodes)—and renamed once again as Best Limited Event Series in 2022.

Avengers: Endgame led the nominations for film with fourteen (sharing Black Panther's nomination record as the second/third most nominated film in the Saturn Awards' history from the previous ceremony), followed by Aladdin with nine and Us with eight. Game of Thrones led the nominations for television with nine, followed by The Walking Dead with six and Outlander with five; The Haunting of Hill House led the nominations for streaming with six, followed by Lost in Space and Star Trek: Discovery with five each.

For film, Avengers: Endgame won the most awards with six, including Best Comic-to-Motion Picture Release and Best Actor in a Film (Robert Downey Jr.), followed by A Quiet Place and Spider-Man: Far From Home with two each. For television, Game of Thrones' eighth and final season won the most awards with four, followed by The Walking Dead with three; Star Trek: Discovery became the streaming series with the most wins with three, followed by Stranger Things with two.

== Winners and nominees ==
=== Film ===
Best Comic-to-Motion Picture Release	Best Science Fiction Film Release
Avengers: Endgame; Aquaman; Avengers: Infinity War; Captain Marvel; Shazam!; Spider-Man: Far From Home; Spider-Man: Into the Spider-Verse	Ready Player One; Alita: Battle Angel; Bumblebee; Jurassic World: Fallen Kingdom; Solo: A Star Wars Story; Sorry to Bother You; Upgrade
Best Fantasy Film Release	Best Horror Film Release
Toy Story 4; Aladdin; Dumbo; Fantastic Beasts: The Crimes of Grindelwald; Godzilla: King of the Monsters; Mary Poppins Returns; Yesterday	A Quiet Place; The Dead Don't Die; Halloween; Hereditary; Overlord; Pet Sematary; Us
Best Action / Adventure Film Release	Best Thriller Film Release
Mission: Impossible – Fallout; Cold Pursuit; Escape Room; Glass; John Wick: Chapter 3 – Parabellum; Skyscraper	Bad Times at the El Royale; Bad Samaritan; Destroyer; Dragged Across Concrete; Greta; Ma; Searching
Best Animated Film Release	Best Independent Film Release
Spider-Man: Into the Spider-Verse; The Grinch; How to Train Your Dragon: The Hidden World; Incredibles 2; Ralph Breaks the Internet; Toy Story 4	Mandy; American Animals; Anna and the Apocalypse; The Man Who Killed Hitler and Then the Bigfoot; Ophelia; Summer of 84; The Tomorrow Man
Best International Film Release	Legion M Breakout Director
Burning; Aniara; Border; Ghost Stories; The Guilty; Shadow	Ari Aster – Hereditary; Michael Chaves – The Curse of La Llorona; Lee Cronin – The Hole in the Ground; Gary Dauberman – Annabelle Comes Home; Steven S. DeKnight – Pacific Rim Uprising; Boots Riley – Sorry to Bother You; Christian Rivers – Mortal Engines; Emma Tammi – The Wind
Best Film Director	Best Film Writing
Jordan Peele – Us; Anna Boden and Ryan Fleck – Captain Marvel; Karyn Kusama – Destroyer; Guy Ritchie – Aladdin; Anthony Russo and Joe Russo – Avengers: Endgame; Steven Spielberg – Ready Player One; James Wan – Aquaman; Zhang Yimou – Shadow	A Quiet Place – Scott Beck, John Krasinski, and Bryan Woods; Avengers: Endgame – Christopher Markus and Stephen McFeely; Bad Times at the El Royale – Drew Goddard; Burning – Lee Chang-dong and Oh Jung-mi; Dragged Across Concrete – S. Craig Zahler; Mission: Impossible – Fallout – Christopher McQuarrie; Us – Jordan Peele
Best Actor in a Film	Best Actress in a Film
Robert Downey Jr. – Avengers: Endgame as Tony Stark / Iron Man; Jeff Bridges – Bad Times at the El Royale as Father Daniel Flynn / Dock O'Kelly; Nicolas Cage – Mandy as Red Miller; Tom Cruise – Mission: Impossible – Fallout as Ethan Hunt; Chris Evans – Avengers: Endgame as Steve Rogers / Captain America; Mel Gibson – Dragged Across Concrete as Brett Ridgeman; Keanu Reeves – John Wick: Chapter 3 – Parabellum as John Wick	Jamie Lee Curtis – Halloween as Laurie Strode; Emily Blunt – Mary Poppins Returns as Mary Poppins; Toni Collette – Hereditary as Annie Graham; Nicole Kidman – Destroyer as Erin Bell; Brie Larson – Captain Marvel as Carol Danvers / Vers / Captain Marvel; Lupita Nyong'o – Us as Adelaide Wilson / Red; Octavia Spencer – Ma as Sue Ann "Ma" Ellington
Best Supporting Actor in a Film	Best Supporting Actress in a Film
Josh Brolin – Avengers: Infinity War as Thanos; John Lithgow – Pet Sematary as Jud Crandall; Lin-Manuel Miranda – Mary Poppins Returns as Jack; Lewis Pullman – Bad Times at the El Royale as Miles Miller; Jeremy Renner – Avengers: Endgame as Clint Barton / Hawkeye; Will Smith – Aladdin as Genie; Steven Yeun – Burning as Ben	Zendaya – Spider-Man: Far From Home as MJ; Cynthia Erivo – Bad Times at the El Royale as Darlene Sweet; Karen Gillan – Avengers: Endgame as Nebula; Amber Heard – Aquaman as Mera; Scarlett Johansson – Avengers: Endgame as Natasha Romanoff / Black Widow; Naomi Scott – Aladdin as Princess Jasmine; Hailee Steinfeld – Bumblebee as Charlie Watson
Best Performance by a Younger Actor in a Film	Best Film Editing
Tom Holland – Spider-Man: Far From Home as Peter Parker / Spider-Man; Evan Alex – Us as Jason Wilson / Pluto; Asher Angel – Shazam! as Billy Batson; Millie Bobby Brown – Godzilla: King of the Monsters as Madison Russell; Jack Dylan Grazer – Shazam! as Frederick "Freddy" Freeman; Shahadi Wright Joseph – Us as Zora Wilson / Umbrae; Millicent Simmonds – A Quiet Place as Regan Abbott	Jeffrey Ford and Matthew Schmidt – Avengers: Endgame; James Herbert – Aladdin; Nicholas Monsour – Us; Kirk Morri – Aquaman; Evan Schiff – John Wick: Chapter 3 – Parabellum; Christopher Tellefsen – A Quiet Place
Best Film Music	Best Film Production Design
Marc Shaiman – Mary Poppins Returns; Danny Elfman – Dumbo; Bear McCreary – Godzilla: King of the Monsters; Alan Menken – Aladdin; Alan Silvestri – Avengers: Endgame; Alan Silvestri – Ready Player One	Charles Wood – Avengers: Endgame; Bill Brzeski – Aquaman; Ruth De Jong – Us; Rick Heinrichs – Dumbo; Gemma Jackson – Aladdin; Horace Ma Gwong-Wing – Shadow; John Myhre – Mary Poppins Returns
Best Film Costume Design	Best Film Make-up
Michael Wilkinson – Aladdin; Kym Barrett – Aquaman; Leah Butler – Shazam!; Judianna Makovsky – Avengers: Endgame; Chen Minzheng – Shadow; Sandy Powell – Mary Poppins Returns	John Blake and Brian Sipe – Avengers: Endgame; Annick Chartier and Adrien Morot – Pet Sematary; Judy Chin and Mike Marino – The Dead Don't Die; Bill Corso – Destroyer; Mark Coulier and Fernanda Perez – Suspiria; Lisa Love and Tate Steinsiek – Dragged Across Concrete; Tristan Versluis, Naomi Donne, and Duncan Jarman – Overlord
Best Film Special / Visual Effects
Matt Aitken, Dan DeLeeuw, Russell Earl, and Dan Sudick – Avengers: Endgame; Scott Benza, Scott Farrar, and Rick O'Connor – A Quiet Place; Theodore Bialek, Brendan Seals, Janek Sirrs, and Alexis Wajsbrot – Spider-Man: Far From Home; Daniele Bigi, Jeff Capogreco, Michael Mulholland, and David Seager – Aladdin; Andrew Booth, Neil Corbould, Huw J. Evans, and Jody Johnson – Mission: Impossible – Fallout; Matthew E. Butler, Grady Cofer, Roger Guyett, and Dave Shirk – Ready Player One; Brian Connor, Eric Frazier, Peter Nofz, and Guillaume Rocheron – Godzilla: King of the Monsters

=== Television ===
==== Programs ====
Television
Best Superhero Television Series	Best Science Fiction Television Series
Supergirl (The CW); Arrow (The CW); Black Lightning (The CW); Cloak & Dagger (Freeform); The Flash (The CW); Gotham (Fox); Legends of Tomorrow (The CW)	Westworld (HBO); The 100 (The CW); Counterpart (Starz); Doctor Who (BBC America); Krypton (Syfy); Manifest (NBC); The Orville (Fox); Roswell, New Mexico (The CW)
Best Fantasy Television Series	Best Horror Television Series
Game of Thrones (HBO); American Gods (Starz); Charmed (The CW); The Good Place (NBC); Good Witch (Hallmark Channel); The Magicians (Syfy); Outlander (Starz); The Outpost (The CW)	The Walking Dead (AMC); American Horror Story: Apocalypse (FX); A Discovery of Witches (AMC); Fear the Walking Dead (AMC); NOS4A2 (AMC); Preacher (AMC); Supernatural (The CW); What We Do in the Shadows (FX)
Best Action / Thriller Television Series	Best Animated Series on Television
Better Call Saul (AMC); Killing Eve (BBC America); The Last Ship (TNT); Mr. Mercedes (Audience); The Purge (USA Network); Riverdale (The CW); The Sinner (USA Network)	Star Wars Resistance (Disney Channel); Archer (FX); DuckTales (Disney Channel); Family Guy (Fox); The Simpsons (Fox)
Streaming Television
Best Streaming Superhero Television Series	Best Streaming Fantasy, Sci-Fi, or Action / Thriller Television Series
Daredevil (Netflix); Doom Patrol (DC Universe); Jessica Jones (Netflix); The Punisher (Netflix); Runaways (Hulu); Swamp Thing (DC Universe); The Umbrella Academy (Netflix)	Star Trek: Discovery (CBS All Access); Black Mirror (Netflix); The Expanse (Prime Video); Good Omens (Prime Video); Jack Ryan (Prime Video); Lost in Space (Netflix); Russian Doll (Netflix)
Best Streaming Horror / Thriller Television Series
Stranger Things (Netflix); Castle Rock (Hulu); Chilling Adventures of Sabrina (Netflix); The Handmaid's Tale (Hulu); The Haunting of Hill House (Netflix); The Twilight Zone (CBS All Access); You (Netflix)

==== Acting ====
Television
Best Actor	Best Actress
Sam Heughan as Jamie Fraser on Outlander (Starz); Grant Gustin as Barry Allen / The Flash on The Flash (The CW); Kit Harington as Jon Snow on Game of Thrones (HBO); Andrew Lincoln as Rick Grimes on The Walking Dead (AMC); Seth MacFarlane as Captain Ed Mercer on The Orville (Fox); Bill Pullman as Detective Harry Ambrose The Sinner (USA Network); Jeffrey Wright as Bernard Lowe / Arnold Weber on Westworld (HBO)	Emilia Clarke as Daenerys Targaryen on Game of Thrones (HBO); Caitríona Balfe as Claire Fraser on Outlander (Starz); Melissa Benoist as Kara Danvers / Supergirl on Supergirl (The CW); Sandra Oh as Eve Polastri on Killing Eve (BBC America); Adrianne Palicki as Commander Kelly Grayson on The Orville (Fox); Candice Patton as Iris West-Allen on The Flash (The CW); Jodie Whittaker as The Doctor on Doctor Who (BBC America)
Best Supporting Actor	Best Supporting Actress
Peter Dinklage as Tyrion Lannister on Game of Thrones (HBO); Jonathan Banks as Mike Ehrmantraut on Better Call Saul (AMC); Nikolaj Coster-Waldau as Jaime Lannister on Game of Thrones (HBO); David Harewood as J'onn J'onzz / Martian Manhunter on Supergirl (The CW); Ed Harris as The Man in Black on Westworld (HBO); Lennie James as Morgan Jones on Fear the Walking Dead (AMC); Khary Payton as Ezekiel on The Walking Dead (AMC)	Danai Gurira as Michonne on The Walking Dead (AMC); Gwendoline Christie as Brienne of Tarth on Game of Thrones (HBO); Lena Headey as Cersei Lannister on Game of Thrones (HBO); Melissa McBride as Carol Peletier on The Walking Dead (AMC); Rhea Seehorn as Kim Wexler on Better Call Saul (AMC); Sophie Skelton as Brianna "Bree" Randall on Outlander (Starz); Sophie Turner as Sansa Stark on Game of Thrones (HBO)
Best Performance by a Younger Actor	Best Guest Starring Performance
Maisie Williams as Arya Stark on Game of Thrones (HBO); KJ Apa as Archie Andrews on Riverdale (The CW); Tosin Cole as Ryan Sinclair on Doctor Who (BBC America); Cameron Cuffe as Seg-El on Krypton (Syfy); David Mazouz as Bruce Wayne / The Dark Knight on Gotham (Fox); Cole Sprouse as Jughead Jones on Riverdale (The CW); Benjamin Wadsworth as Marcus Lopez Arguello on Deadly Class (Syfy)	Jeffrey Dean Morgan as Negan on The Walking Dead (AMC); Rainer Bock as Werner Ziegler on Better Call Saul (AMC); Jon Cryer as Lex Luthor on Supergirl (The CW); Sydney Lemmon as Isabelle on Fear the Walking Dead (AMC); Tonya Pinkins as Martha on Fear the Walking Dead (AMC); Ed Speleers as Stephen Bonnet on Outlander (Starz)
Streaming Television
Best Actor	Best Actress
Henry Thomas as Young Hugh Crain on The Haunting of Hill House (Netflix); Penn Badgley as Joe Goldberg on You (Netflix); Jon Bernthal as Frank Castle / Punisher on The Punisher (Netflix); Charlie Cox as Matt Murdock / Daredevil on Daredevil (Netflix); Zac Efron as Ted Bundy on Extremely Wicked, Shockingly Evil and Vile (Netflix); John Krasinski as Jack Ryan on Jack Ryan (Prime Video); David Tennant as Crowley on Good Omens (Prime Video)	Sonequa Martin-Green as Michael Burnham on Star Trek: Discovery (CBS All Access); Carla Gugino as Olivia Crain on The Haunting of Hill House (Netflix); Elizabeth Lail as Guinevere Beck on You (Netflix); Natasha Lyonne as Nadia Vulvokov on Russian Doll (Netflix); Molly Parker as Maureen Robinson on Lost in Space (Netflix); Krysten Ritter as Jessica Jones on Jessica Jones (Netflix); Kiernan Shipka as Sabrina Spellman on Chilling Adventures of Sabrina (Netflix)
Best Supporting Actor	Best Supporting Actress
Doug Jones as Saru on Star Trek: Discovery (CBS All Access); Wilson Cruz as Hugh Culber on Star Trek: Discovery (CBS All Access); Michiel Huisman as Steven Crain on The Haunting of Hill House (Netflix); Timothy Hutton as Hugh Crain on The Haunting of Hill House (Netflix); Maxwell Jenkins as Will Robinson on Lost in Space (Netflix); Ethan Peck as Spock on Star Trek: Discovery (CBS All Access); Michael Sheen as Aziraphale on Good Omens (Prime Video)	Maya Hawke as Robin Buckley on Stranger Things (Netflix); Elliot Page (Note: Credited as Ellen Page; The Umbrella Academy premiered before Page came out as transgender.) as Vanya Hargreeves / The White Violin / Number Seven on The Umbrella Academy (Netflix); Victoria Pedretti as Eleanor "Nell" Crain Vance on The Haunting of Hill House (Netflix); Parker Posey as June Harris / Dr. Smith on Lost in Space (Netflix); Taylor Russell as Judy Robinson on Lost in Space (Netflix); Sissy Spacek as Ruth Deaver on Castle Rock (Hulu); Deborah Ann Woll as Karen Page on Daredevil (Netflix)

=== Home Entertainment ===
Best DVD or Blu-ray Release	Best DVD or Blu-ray Classic Film Release
King Cohen; Fahrenheit 451; Jonathan; Kin; Nancy Drew and the Hidden Staircase; Time Freak	2001: A Space Odyssey (4K); Deep Rising; Jack the Giant Killer; Maximum Overdrive; The Reincarnation of Peter Proud; The Spiral Staircase
Best DVD or Blu-ray Special Edition Release	Best DVD or Blu-ray Television Movie or Series Release
Waterworld (Limited Edition); 12 Monkeys (Collector's Edition); The Changeling (Limited Edition); Crimson Peak (Limited Edition); A Fistful of Dollars (Special Edition); Horror Express (Special Edition)	The Outer Limits; The Ghost of Sierra de Cobre; The Martian Chronicles; The Night Stalker; The Night Strangler; Trilogy of Terror
Best DVD or Blu-ray Collection Release
Universal Classic Monsters: Complete 30-Film Collection (Dracula, Frankenstein, The Mummy, The Invisible Man, Bride of Frankenstein, Werewolf of London, Dracula's Daughter, Son of Frankenstein, The Invisible Man Returns, The Mummy's Hand, The Invisible Woman, The Wolf Man, The Ghost of Frankenstein, Invisible Agent, The Mummy's Tomb, Phantom of the Opera, Frankenstein Meets the Wolf Man, Son of Dracula, The Invisible Man's Revenge, The Mummy's Ghost, The Mummy's Curse, House of Frankenstein, House of Dracula, She-Wolf of London, Abbott and Costello Meet Frankenstein, Abbott and Costello Meet the Invisible Man, Creature from the Black Lagoon, Abbott and Costello Meet the Mummy, Revenge of the Creature, and The Creature Walks Among Us); The Bloodthirsty Trilogy (The Vampire Doll, Lake of Dracula, and Evil of Dracula); The Complete Sartana (If You Meet Sartana Pray for Your Death, I am Sartana, Your Angel of Death, Sartana's Here... Trade Your Pistol for a Coffin, Have a Good Funeral, My Friend... Sartana Will Pay, and Light the Fuse... Sartana Is Coming); Jack Ryan: 5-Film Collection (4K) (The Hunt for Red October, Patriot Games, Clear and Present Danger, The Sum of All Fears, and Jack Ryan: Shadow Recruit); The Matrix Trilogy (4K) (The Matrix, The Matrix Reloaded, and The Matrix Revolutions); The Pink Panther: Classic Cartoon Collection (see full list of 124 shorts)

=== Local Stage Production ===
Best Local Stage Production
- Puppet Up! – Uncensored (Henson Alternative)
  - Charlie and the Chocolate Factory (Segerstrom Center for the Arts)
  - A Gentleman's Guide to Love and Murder (3-D Theatricals / Cerritos Center)
  - An Inspector Calls (Wallis Annenberg Center for the Performing Arts)
  - The Old Man and the Old Moon (The PigPen Theatre Company at The Wallis)
  - One Flew Over the Cuckoo's Nest – The Immersive Experience (After Hours Theatre Company)
  - The Secret Garden (3-D Theatricals / Cerritos Center)

=== Special Achievement Awards ===
- Visionary Award – Jon Favreau
- Dan Curtis Legacy Award – Jeph Loeb
- Stan Lee World Builder Award – Kevin Feige

== Multiple wins and nominations ==
=== Wins ===
Film
Wins	Film
6	Avengers: Endgame
2	A Quiet Place
2	Spider-Man: Far From Home

Television
Wins	Series
4	Game of Thrones
3	The Walking Dead

Streaming Television
Wins	Series
3	Star Trek: Discovery
2	Stranger Things

=== Nominations ===
Film
Nominations	Film
14	Avengers: Endgame
9	Aladdin
8	Us
6	Aquaman
6	Mary Poppins Returns
5	Bad Times at the El Royale
5	A Quiet Place
4	Destroyer
4	Dragged Across Concrete
4	Godzilla: King of the Monsters
4	Mission: Impossible – Fallout
4	Ready Player One
4	Shadow
4	Shazam!
4	Spider-Man: Far From Home
3	Burning
3	Captain Marvel
3	Dumbo
3	Hereditary
3	John Wick: Chapter 3 – Parabellum
3	Pet Sematary
2	Avengers: Infinity War
2	Bumblebee
2	The Dead Don't Die
2	Halloween
2	Ma
2	Mandy
2	Overlord
2	Sorry to Bother You
2	Spider-Man: Into the Spider-Verse
2	Toy Story 4

Television
Nominations	Series
9	Game of Thrones
6	The Walking Dead
5	Outlander
4	Better Call Saul
4	Fear the Walking Dead
4	Supergirl
3	Doctor Who
3	The Flash
3	The Orville
3	Riverdale
3	Westworld
2	Gotham
2	Killing Eve
2	Krypton
2	The Sinner

Streaming Television
Nominations	Series
6	The Haunting of Hill House
5	Lost in Space
5	Star Trek: Discovery
3	Daredevil
3	Good Omens
3	You
2	Castle Rock
2	Chilling Adventures of Sabrina
2	Jack Ryan
2	Jessica Jones
2	The Punisher
2	Russian Doll
2	Stranger Things
2	The Umbrella Academy
