= If You Meet Sartana Pray for Your Death =

1968 film

- Italian theatrical release poster
- Directed by: Gianfranco Parolini
- Screenplay by: Renato Izzo; Gianfranco Parolini; Theo Maria Werner
- Story by: Luigi De Santis; Fabio Piccioni; Adolfo Cagnacci
- Produced by: Aldo Addobbati; Theo Maria Werner
- Starring: Gianni Garko; William Berger; Sydney Chaplin; Gianni Rizzo; Fernando Sancho; Klaus Kinski
- Cinematography: Sandro Mancori
- Edited by: Edmond Lozzi
- Music by: Piero Piccioni
- Production companies: Paris Etoile Film; Parnass Film
- Distributed by: Paris Etoile Film (Italy); Nora (West Germany)
- Release dates: 14 August 1968 (Italy); 22 August 1969 (Germany)
- Running time: 97 minutes
- Countries: Italy; West Germany

If You Meet Sartana Pray for Your Death (Italian: Se incontri Sartana prega per la tua morte) is a 1968 Spaghetti Western film directed by Gianfranco Parolini. The film stars Gianni Garko, William Berger, Fernando Sancho and Klaus Kinski, and features a musical score by Piero Piccioni.

If You Meet Sartana Pray for Your Death was the first in a series of Spaghetti Westerns based on the character Sartana. It was followed by four other official Sartana films: I Am Sartana Your Angel of Death (Sono Sartana, il vostro becchino, 1969), Have a Good Funeral, My Friend... Sartana Will Pay (Buon funerale, amigos!... paga Sartana, 1970), Light the Fuse... Sartana Is Coming (Una nuvola di polvere... un grido di morte... arriva Sartana, 1970) and Sartana's Here... Trade Your Pistol for a Coffin (C'è Sartana... vendi la pistola e comprati la bara, 1970), in the last of which Garko was replaced by George Hilton. The four sequels were directed by Giuliano Carnimeo, Parolini was chosen to direct The Sabata Trilogy, after producer Alberto Grimaldi saw his work on the first Sartana film. As with Django a few years earlier, several directors, such as Demofilo Fidani, made unofficial sequels to cash in on the success of Sartana.

== History ==
The name "Sartana" first appeared in the film Blood at Sundown (Mille dollari sul nero, 1967), in which Garko played an antagonist called El General Sartana. The film was very successful in Germany and known by the short title Sartana. Italian producer Aldo Addobbati noticed the film's success and set up a co-production with a German producer in Italy. Garko was offered a contract and he accepted after inserting a clause stating that the script must be approved by him. In a 2005 interview, Garko said he wanted a subject that would not be based on vengeance, as he had already portrayed characters bent on revenge in Blood at Sundown and Guns of Violence (10.000 dollari per un massacro, 1967). After he turned down several scripts with a revenge theme, Renato Izzo wrote a story about a smart, non-sentimental character that profits by putting himself between two rival groups. Sartana's use of mechanical gadgets was added by director Parolini, who was a fan of the James Bond films. If You Meet Sartana Pray for Your Death then went into production.

== Plot ==
An elderly couple on a horse-drawn carriage is attacked by a gang led by Morgan. Sartana arrives on the scene and kills the robbers except for Morgan who gets away. Soon after, a stagecoach carrying a shipment of gold is robbed by a Mexican gang at the order of General Jose Manuel Mendoza, with a gang member posing as a passenger murdering the others. However, the gang is ambushed and killed by Lasky and his men. Lasky then tells his gang that he will meet them later. As the men are about to open the strongbox from the coach, Lasky kills them all with a Gatling gun. After opening the strongbox, he finds only rocks instead of gold. Spooked by Sartana's playing one of the murdered passengers' musical watch, he heads to town to meet with Jeff Stewal, a politician, and Alman, a banker, to collect his payment as part of an insurance fraud.

Sartana cleans Lasky out, as well as four other men, in a card game, and outguns the four when they go after him. Lasky collects a gang and goes after Sartana, who lures them to the scene of Lasky's previous massacre. Realizing what Lasky has done, the gang turn on him and chase him to a cabin which Lasky has boobytrapped with dynamite. Lasky detonates the explosives, wiping out his own men, but the watching Sartana again spooks him and allows him to get away. Lasky then sends Morgan, his now-partner, to kill Sartana, but Morgan fails and is killed himself. Another gang hired by Lasky is wiped out by Sartana, who again deliberately lets Lasky escape. After Lasky blackmails Stewal and Alman and the news about the robbed stagecoach finally breaks, the two inform Mendoza that it was Lasky who killed his men. Mendoza's men capture Lasky and try to make him talk, thinking that he knows where the gold is hidden. Lasky tells him that only Sartana knows the location of the gold.

Meanwhile, Stewal, who has been having an affair with the late mayor's widow, plans to escape with the gold, supposedly hidden in the late mayor's coffin, and Alman's wife Evelyn. After Sartana tells him that Mendoza is going to dig up the coffin with the gold and keep it all for himself, Stewal goes to check if it is true and is killed by Mendoza's men. Thinking that Mendoza now has the gold, Lasky sneaks into his residence and kills him and his men with his Gatling gun. Sartana also arrives and the two open the coffin, only to discover it filled with rocks and the mayor's corpse instead of gold. Lasky then shoots Sartana and apparently kills him. The gold has been hidden by Alman, who has killed the mayor's widow and now tells his plan to his wife. Evelyn betrays and kills him, then takes Lasky to the gold, which has been hidden in another coffin. Lasky kills Evelyn, but when Sartana appears alive and unharmed the two engage in a final duel. Lasky is killed and Sartana rides out of town with the coffin full of gold.

== Cast ==
- John Garko as Sartana
- William Berger as Lasky
- Sidney Chaplin as Jeff Stewal
- Gianni Rizzo as Alman
- Fernando Sancho as José Manuel Mendoza
- Klaus Kinski as Morgan
- Andrea Scotti as Perdido
- Carlo Tamberlani as Reverend Logan
- Franco Pesce as Dusty

== Releases ==
If You Meet Sartana Pray for Your Death was released theatrically in Italy on 14 August 1968. Within nine days of its release the film grossed 30 million Italian lira. To promote the film at its premiere, the Roman cinema had a Western set presented complete with horses and a carriage. A sequel to the film was announced shortly after the film's release. An unofficial derivative film titled Sartana Does Not Forgive was released two months after the Italian premiere. Two others followed the next year titled Shadow of Sartana...Shadow of Your Death and Four Came to Kill Sartana. If You Meet Sartana Pray for Your Death was released in Germany on 22 August 1969 as Sartana - Bete um deinen Tod.
