= Blood at Sundown =

1966 film by Alberto Cardone

- Directed by: Alberto Cardone
- Screenplay by: Ernesto Gastaldi; Vittorio Salerno; Rolf Olsen
- Story by: Ernesto Gastaldi; Vittorio Salerno; Rolf Olsen
- Starring: Anthony Steffen; Gianni Garko; Erika Blanc; Carlo D'Angelo
- Cinematography: Gino Santini
- Edited by: Romeo Ciatti
- Music by: Michele Lacerenza
- Production companies: Metheus Film; Lisa Film
- Distributed by: Indipendenti Regionali
- Release date: 18 December 1966 (Italy)
- Countries: Italy; West Germany

Blood at Sundown (German: Sartana; Italian: 1000 dollari sul nero, lit. '1000 dollars on the black') is a Spaghetti Western film directed by Alberto Cardone. The film is notable as the primary inspiration for the Sartana film series, starring Gianni Garko as an antiheroic incarnation of the villainous character he previously portrayed in Blood at Sundown.

== Plot ==
Johnny Liston heads back to his hometown after 12 years in jail, during which time his ruthless brother Sartana (Garko) has taken over control of the town. Johnny is determined to battle Sartana and bring him to justice.

== Cast ==
- Anthony Steffen as Johnny Liston
- Gianni Garko as Sartana Liston (as John Garko)
- Erika Blanc as Joselita Rogers
- Carlo D'Angelo as Judge Waldorf (as Charles of Angel)
- Sieghardt Rupp as Ralph
- Roberto Miali as Jerry Holt (as Jerry Wilson)
- Carla Calò as Rhonda Liston (as Carrol Brown)
- Angelica Ott as Mary
- Daniela Igliozzi as Manuela Holt
- Franco Fantasia as Sheriff
- Gianni Solaro as Forrester
- Chris Howland as Doodle Kramer
- Gino Marturano as Man in bar
- Sal Borgese as Mexican in bar
- Ettore Arena
- Mario Dionisi

== Release ==
Blood at Sundown was released in Italy as 1000 dollari sul nero on 18 December 1966.

== Legacy ==
The character of Sartana proved to be so popular that when Blood at Sundown was released in Germany, it was re-titled to simply Sartana. On noting the film's success, Italian producer Aldo Addobbati and a German producer wanted Garko to continue making films as the Sartana character, but as a hero rather than a villain, with the actor accepting a contract to star as Sartana in several Spaghetti Western films, with a clause granting him script approval; looking to portray a different type of character compared to those he had played in Ten Thousand Dollars for a Massacre and Vengeance Is Mine, which were not very popular with audiences, Garko turned down several scripts with a vengeance theme, before accepting one by Renato Izzo envisioning Sartana as a smart, non-sentimental character that profits by putting himself between two rival groups, which would become If You Meet Sartana Pray for Your Death.
