= Addobbati =

Addobbati is an Italian surname. Notable people with the surname include:

- Aldo Addobbati, Italian film producer
- Andrea Addobbati (born 1964), Italian historian
- Giuseppe Addobbati (1909–1986), Italian film actor
- Mario Addobbati, Italian who appeared in a small uncredited role in King Vidor's War and Peace (1956)
- Pierino Addobbati, minor character in Wu Ming's novel 54
- Cavalieri Addobbati, name for Italian knights, also known as Cavalieri di Corredo
- Ana Addobbati, Brazilian journalist, founder of Women Friendly, initiative that tackles sexual harassment in corporations
- Raphaello Addobbati, Italian who migrated to Brazil and founded the Yolanda factories, first industry of the northeast Region, which plant was located in Recife. Also, presided the football club Sport Clube do Recife
