= Sartana =

Western film series

- Cover of the 2018 The Complete Sartana box set by Arrow Video
- Original work: If You Meet Sartana Pray for Your Death
- Years: 1968 - 1970

Films and television
- Film(s): If You Meet Sartana Pray for Your Death; I am Sartana, Your Angel of Death; Sartana's Here… Trade Your Pistol for a Coffin; Have a Good Funeral, My Friend... Sartana Will Pay; Light the Fuse... Sartana Is Coming

Sartana is a series of Spaghetti Western films which follows the adventures of the title character, a gunfighter and gambler who uses mechanical gadgets and seemingly supernatural powers to trick his rivals. The series features five official entries: If You Meet Sartana Pray for Your Death (1968); I am Sartana, Your Angel of Death (1969); Sartana's Here… Trade Your Pistol for a Coffin (1970); Have a Good Funeral, My Friend... Sartana Will Pay (1970); and Light the Fuse... Sartana Is Coming (1970). The first film was directed by Gianfranco Parolini, with the remaining four directed by Giuliano Carnimeo. Sartana is portrayed by Gianni Garko in all films in the series except for Sartana's Here... Trade Your Pistol for a Coffin, in which he was portrayed by George Hilton.

The name "Sartana" was first used for Garko's character in the film Blood at Sundown (1966), which proved very popular on its release in Italy and Germany, leading to producers to develop a new series around the Sartana character. Garko took creative control of the character, and gave him unique abilities to differentiate him from other spaghetti Western characters such as Django and the Man with No Name. If You Meet Sartana Pray for Your Death was a financial success; aside from its four sequels, it inspired a host of unofficial films made throughout the late 1960s and early 1970s, such as One Damned Day at Dawn… Django Meets Sartana!, Sartana Kills Them All (both 1970) and Alleluja & Sartana are Sons... Sons of God (1972). The unofficial films bear little resemblance to the original character and occasionally do not even feature a character named Sartana, such as Sartana Kills Them All.

In Film Comment, Bert Fridlund described the financial performance of the Sartana films as "fairly successful, with an Italian box office reception well above the average for spaghetti Westerns", although they did not match the success of Parolini's rival Sabata trilogy or Enzo Barboni's Trinity duology.

== Overview ==
In the official Sartana films, Sartana is a gunfighter and gambler who appears to have supernatural abilities which he uses to trick his rivals. These include appearing in improbable and even physically impossible places, such as in I am Sartana, Your Angel of Death, when Sartana is seen by the banker Sims through a window in the distance, and then suddenly enters the room. Of all the Spaghetti Western characters, Kevin Grant wrote in his book Any Gun Can Play that Sartana's personality and traits are sustained and developed among the official films. Film historian and critic Roberto Curti noted that Sartana loses some of his more menacing traits featured in his first film, but still retains his catchphrase "I am your pallbearer". In the second film, Sartana is described by Curti as being a "conjurer of the Wild West" who is able to turn various objects, from spoons to a cartwheel, into weapons. In the third film the series, Sartana's appearance changes, with the character now wearing a black bow-tie, and he often resorts to disguises. Sartana would continue to resort to his conjurer tricks in the film, making his tiny pistol appear out of such unexpected places as a hat, a boot, and a loaf of bread. In the fourth film, Sartana has a moustache and continues to use seemingly ordinary objects as weaponized gadgets, such as razor-sharp playing cards.

The plots of the Sartana films mostly revolve around short-term alliances and betrayals between groups who are attempting to get money or objects of value. These acts of duplicity occur continuously between various characters, which Bert Fridlund of Film International described as "producing quite complex stories". Rather than following a continuous storyline, all films in the series are stand-alone and do not require knowledge of the plots or characters of earlier entries. In the first film, If You Meet Sartana Pray for Your Death (1968), Sartana arrives in a small town that is rife with corruption where several criminals are after a chest of gold and often double-cross and blackmail each other to get it. They are continuously foiled by Sartana, who eventually gets away with the loot. The second film, I am Sartana, Your Angel of Death (1969), finds Sartana as a wanted man after being framed for a bank robbery. He tries to avoid several bounty hunters who are after him, while unmasking who has set him up. In Sartana's Here… Trade Your Pistol for a Coffin (1970), Sartana arrives in a mining town where he gets involved with several double-crosses involving a stolen shipment of gold. He often meets with a character named Sabata, a white-clad gunman who quotes William Shakespeare and Lord Tennyson, who foils several of Sartana's plans. The character of Sabata in this film is not the same character from the 1969 film of the same name. In the fourth film, Have a Good Funeral, My Friend... Sartana Will Pay (1970), an owner of a goldmine is murdered, leading his daughter to arrive in town to claim the property. She finds herself thwarted by several criminals and the town sheriff, who all have their eye on the gold, until Sartana arrives to interfere with their plans. In the last film in the official series, Light the Fuse... Sartana Is Coming (1970), Sartana helps clear the name of Grandville Fuller, who he assists in a jailbreak after he is accused of murder. The two head to the scene of a crime to unravel the situation. Curti described the final film as containing elements of other genres such as the giallo, as it depicts Sartana as a detective who investigates and solves a mystery. Curti also noted that the film features a near-cartoonish amount of irony that was only touched upon in previous entries to the series.

English Title	Italian title	Release date	Ref(s)
If You Meet Sartana Pray for Your Death	Se incontri Sartana prega per la tua morte	14 August 1968	
I am Sartana, Your Angel of Death	Sono Sartana, il vostro becchino	November 1969	
Sartana's Here… Trade Your Pistol for a Coffin	C'è Sartana... vendi la pistola e comprati la bara	August 1970	
Have a Good Funeral, My Friend... Sartana Will Pay	Buon funerale amigos!... paga Sartana	October 1970	
Light the Fuse... Sartana Is Coming	Una nuvola di polvere... un grido di morte... arriva Sartana	24 December 1970	

== Production ==
The character of Sartana was first created by screenwriters Ernesto Gastaldi and Vittorio Salerno for the film Blood at Sundown (1966), directed by Alberto Cardone. Played by Gianni Garko, Sartana is portrayed here as a villain who frames his brother for murder. The character of Sartana proved to be so popular that when Blood at Sundown was released in Germany, it was re-titled to simply Sartana. A German producer wanted Garko to continue making films as the Sartana character, but as a hero rather than a villain. The producer proposed two scripts, neither of which interested Garko as he was looking to portray a different type of character compared to those he had played in Ten Thousand Dollars for a Massacre and Vengeance Is Mine, which were not very popular with audiences.

The Sartana character in Blood at Sundown does not have the look or demeanour that the character that would eventually exhibit, beginning with the film If You Meet Sartana Pray for Your Death. Garko stated that the new interpretation of the character was influenced by the film's director, Gianfranco Parolini, whose interpretation of Sartana was inspired by Lee Falk's comic strip character Mandrake the Magician, a black-caped illusionist. The character would also use mechanical gadgets similar to those used by James Bond in his film series. Contrary to characters such as Django or the protagonists of the Dollars Trilogy, Sartana is entirely money-oriented and typically succeeds in securing his sought-after riches. Sartana also has a flashier wardrobe and browses saloons with lush interiors compared to the typically ragged appearances and simple surroundings of earlier Spaghetti Westerns and their characters. Garko spoke later about the creation of the character in 1990, stating that cartoon strips were "like film, are part of arte d'imagine and therein lie [Sartana's] cultural roots". He specifically consulted with the writers of each film to preserve the character's integrity and would later claim that he had a clause in his contract with producer Aldo Addobbati that the scripts had to meet with his approval. Garko would portray Sartana in all the official films except for Sartana's Here… Trade Your Pistol for a Coffin due to a scheduling conflict with his commitment to Enzo G. Castellari's film Cold Eyes of Fear (1971), which led to George Hilton portraying Sartana. Director Giuliano Carnimeo stated that for Sartana's Here… Trade Your Pistol for a Coffin, the producers decided to develop the project as a Sartana film despite the change in casting due to the character's popularity with audiences.

=== Crew ===
Occupation	Film					Ref(s)
Occupation	If You Meet Sartana Pray for Your Death	I am Sartana, Your Angel of Death	Sartana's Here… Trade Your Pistol for a Coffin	Have a Good Funeral, My Friend... Sartana Will Pay	Light the Fuse... Sartana Is Coming	Ref(s)
Director	Gianfranco Parolini	Giuliano Carnimeo	Giuliano Carnimeo	Giuliano Carnimeo	Giuliano Carnimeo	
Producer(s)	Aldo Addobbati	Aldo Addobbati; Paolo Moffa	Sergio Borelli; Franco Palaggi	Sergio Borelli	Eduardo Manzanos Brochero; Luciano Martino	
Screenwriter(s)	Renato Izzo; Gianfranco Parolini; Werner Hauff	Tito Capri; Enzo Dell'Aquila	Tito Capri	Roberto Gianviti; Giovanni Simonelli	Eduardo Manzanos Brochero; Tito Capri; Ernesto Gastaldi	
Screen story writers	Luigi De Santis; Fabio Piccioni; Adolfo Cagnacci	Tito Carpi	Tito Carpi	Giovanni Simonelli	Eduardo Manzanos Brochero	
Composer(s)	Piero Piccioni	Vasco Vassil Kojucharov; Elsio Mancuso	Francesco De Masi	Bruno Nicolai	Bruno Nicolai	
Director of photography	Sandro Mancori	Giovanni Bergamini	Stelvio Massi	Stelvio Massi	Julio Ortas	
Editor	Edmondo Lozzi	Ornella Micheli	Ornella Micheli	Giuliana Attenni	Ornella Michelli	

== Reception ==
The directors of the Sartana films would later declare their fondness for their entries in the series, with Carnimeo proclaiming that Sartana's Here… Trade Your Pistol for a Coffin was "perhaps [his] best film", describing Hilton as a better fit for the role than Garko due to the increasingly "absurd" situations Sartana would find himself in. Parolini stated that If You Meet Sartana Pray for Your Death was "the film I love the most and gave me the most satisfaction." According to Garko, Parolini left after the first film for the opportunity to work with Lee Van Cleef on Sabata. Van Cleef's Sabata was compared to being similar to Sartana by Grant, noting the character's penchant for gadget-like firearms, and that Sabata is referred similarly to Sartana in the films as a "pallbearer". Bert Fridlund described the financial gross of the Sartana films as "fairly successful, with an Italian box office reception well above the average for spaghetti westerns" while not as popular as Sabata, which had grossed over 1 billion lire, or Barboni's They Call Me Trinity and Trinity Is Still My Name.

Retrospective reviews of the series include Amy Longsdorf of the Courier-Post, who stated that "of all the Spaghetti westerns which arrived in the wake of Clint Eastwood's "Man With No Name" trilogy the "Sartana flicks [...] ranks as some of the best." James Evans of Starburst found the films to be "convoluted and occasionally plodding" but in certain cases, such as Light the Fuse… Sartana is Coming they could be "still convoluted but nevertheless entertaining, well-directed and atmospheric films that combine action, humour and invention throughout."

== Legacy ==
Comparing the character of Django to Sartana, Carnimeo noted that the former solves his issues with high levels of violence, and that while the latter was embroiled in revenge-themed storylines, his more ironic edge and use of humorous weapons served as a precursor to full-blown comedic Spaghetti Western characters such as Trinity.

=== Unofficial Sartana films ===
Although the name "Sartana" would be used by characters in other filmmakers' works, the official films by Parolini and Carmineo had few direct imitators. As Gastaldi and Salerno did not use the name of the character in the film's title for Blood at Sundown, they could not copyright the name. This led to several films being released with "Sartana" in their titles, with only George Ardisson in Django Against Sartana (1970) being a notable example due to the character's resemblance to the Sartana from the official films. In a 1995 interview, Gastaldi commented claimed to have never seen the other Sartana films.

The first unofficial Sartana films appeared shortly after the release of If You Meet Sartana Pray for Your Death. Two months after the release of the film, Alfonso Balcazar's film Sonora (1968) was distributed under the title Sartana Does Not Forgive. In 1969, director Demofilo Fidani directed two unofficial Sartana films: Shadow of Sartana ... Shadow of Your Death (Italian: Passa Sartana è la ombra della tua morte) and Four Came to Kill Sartana (Italian: ...e vennero in quattro per uccidere Sartana!). Fridlund described Fidani's Sartana films as not having very involved plots and contained simply orchestrated fight sequences where "the bad guys (and their director or script writers) can seldom come up with anything more clever than to, one at a time, make an open rush against the sneaking hero and consequently get shot." In 1970, several more unofficial Sartana films were released: Django Defies Sartana and another film directed by Fidani titled One Damned Day at Dawn… Django Meets Sartana!. Other film included Roberto Mauri's Sartana in the Valley of Death and Sartana Kills Them All. In the English version of Sartana in the Valley of Death, titled Ballad of Death Valley, the hero is referred to as Lee Calloway and never as Sartana. Sartana Kills Them All starred Garko as a character called Larry Santana who is dressed in a brown leather jacket with fringes, not a black suit and long coat, and he does not use special weapons or tricks. Fidani made another unofficial Sartana film in 1970, titled Django and Sartana Are Coming... It's the End. In 1971, other films baring the name were released such as Let's Go and Kill Sartana, where the titular character does not appear in the film. Two more films followed in 1972 with Trinity and Sartana are Coming and Alleluja & Sartana are Sons... Sons of God. The two latter films were comedy-oriented films that followed the success of They Call Me Trinity.
