= Samson Burke =

Canadian bodybuilder, wrestler and actor (born 1930)

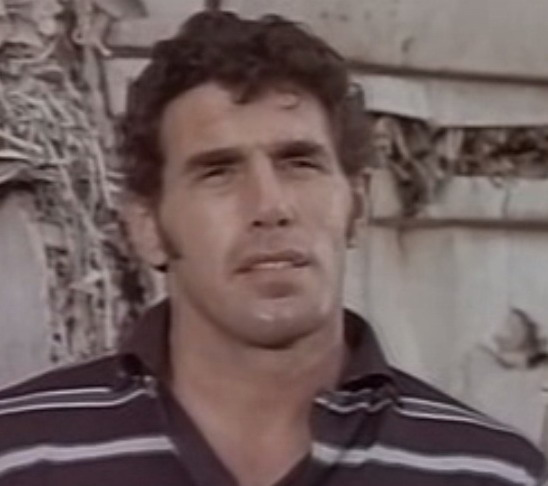
- Burke in Torture Me But Kill Me with Kisses (1968)

Personal information
- Born: 6 April 1930 (age 96) Montreal, Quebec, Canada
- Website: http://www.samsonburke.com/

Professional wrestling career
- Ring name: Sammy Berg
- Billed from: Samuel Burke
- Debut: 1949
- Retired: 1964

Samson Burke (born Samuel Burke; 6 April 1930) is a retired Canadian bodybuilder, swimmer, wrestler and actor.

== Biography ==
Born Samuel Burke in Montreal Canada on 6 April 1930, Burke earned a college degree in physical education. In the 1950s, Burke wrestled for nine years under the names "Sammy Berg" and "Mr Canada", and sparred with athletes including Primo Carnera, Antonino Rocca, Lou Thesz and Joe Louis. He worked in Montreal, Ottawa, Ontario, Toronto, NWA St. Louis, California, Ohio, the Pacific Northwest, Calgary, and Hawaii.

His friend Gordon Mitchell recommended Burke for the lead role of Ursus in the 1961 film The Revenge of Ursus. Burke next appeared opposite Italian comedian Totò in the 1962 comedy Toto vs. Maciste. Norman Maurer then hired him to portray the mythical Greek hero Hercules in The Three Stooges Meet Hercules (1962).

As the sword and sandal craze faded, Burke played Little John in an Italian film called The Triumph of Robin Hood, Polyphemus in a 1968 Italian miniseries of The Odyssey, a villain in a Kommissar X film Kommissar X – Drei grüne Hunde (Death Trip), Harald Reinl's Nibelungenlied films, and appeared alongside Gianni Garko and Klaus Kinski in both a spaghetti Western, Sartana the Gravedigger, and an Italian war film, Five for Hell (similar in theme to The Dirty Dozen). In the 1980s, Burke relocated to Hawaii and worked on the show Magnum, P.I. until it ceased production in 1988.

== Championships and accomplishments ==
- Worldwide Wrestling Associates / NWA Hollywood Wrestling

- NWA International Television Tag Team Championship (1 time) – with Seymour Koenig

- Stampede Wrestling

- NWA Canadian Heavyweight Championship (Calgary version) (1 time)
