= Charles Southwood =

American actor

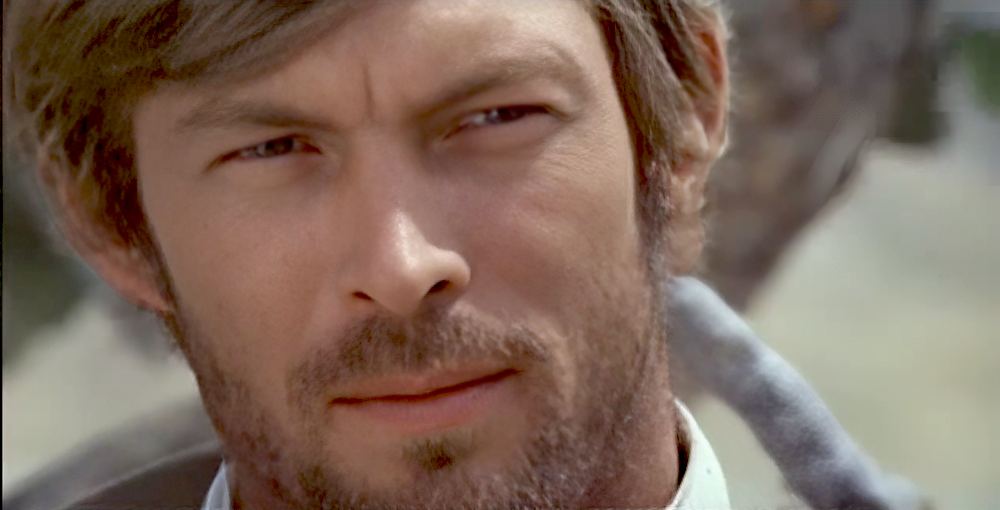
- CharlesSouthwood-1968.
- Born: Charles Allen Southwood; August 30, 1937; Los Angeles, California
- Died: April 8, 2009; Grants Pass, Oregon
- Education: Oregon State University
- Occupation: Actor

Charles Southwood was an American actor in Europe and the founder of Death Cigarettes.

== Biography ==
Southwood is connected with Spaghetti Westerns.

Born in Los Angeles in 1937, his family moved to Oregon at the end of World War II. He earned a degree in philosophy at Oregon State University.

He travelled to Europe where he worked at a variety of jobs before becoming a stand in for Lex Barker on Woman Times Seven in 1966. He was spotted by an agent who led him into lead roles in Spaghetti Westerns.

=== Death Cigarettes ===
Southwood founded Death Cigarettes for "truth-in-advertising".

Returning to Oregon, he came up with the idea of "Death Cigarettes" in 1991. Deciding to be honest about the effect of cigarettes, Southwood, a smoker from age 13 to 40, decided to be brutally honest about his cigarettes. In addition to the standard warnings, Death Cigarettes were packed in their own coffin: a stark little black package bearing a skull and crossbones. Southwood traveled to the Southern United States, where the major U.S. tobacco companies found his idea "antithetical to their interests." He found a small tobacco company in Holland that was willing to manufacture his cigarettes, and he briefly took up smoking again to get the blend of tobaccos just right, however he couldn't find a cigarette distributor willing to move his product into stores. "I think they're afraid of pressure from the major cigarette manufacturers".

See also Death cigarettes (by BJ Cunningham) sold in England from 1991-1999.

== Personal life ==
Southwood was married to Anick, a University teacher and had two children a son, Chris and a daughter Amelie.

== Filmography ==
Year	Title	Role	Notes
1968	Three Silver Dollars	Alan Burton	
1968	Stranger Make the Sign of the Cross	Frank - Bounty Hunter	
1970	C'è Sartana... vendi la pistola e comprati la bara!	Sabbath	
1970	Roy Colt and Winchester Jack	Winchester Jack	
1971	They Call Me Hallelujah	Grand Duke Alexey Wissayolovich Kropotkin	
1971	Manhunt for Murder	Insp. Marvin Hobbart	
1972	There Was Once a Cop	Narcotics Agent	
1972	She No Longer Talks She Shoots	Beatnik	
1973	Some Too Quiet Gentlemen	Charles	
1973	Profession: Adventurers	Henry Ralstrom	
1981	Documenteur	the Man on a Water Bed	(final film role)
