= Federico Boido =

Italian actor (1938–2014)

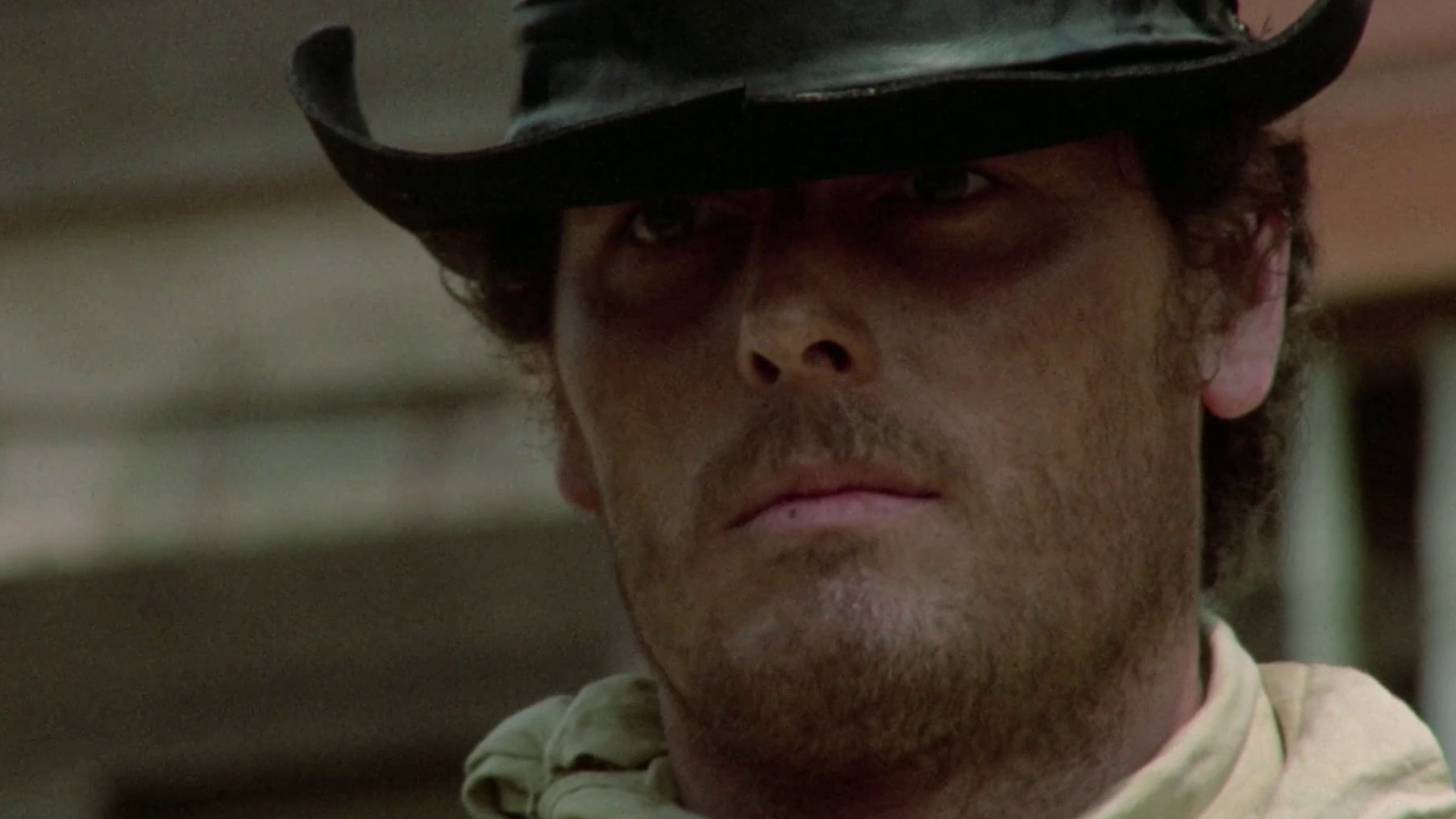
- Federico Boido in Brigitte, Laura, Ursula, Monica, Raquel, Litz, Florinda, Barbara, Claudia, e Sofia le chiamo tutte... anima mia (1974)
- Born: 8 January 1938; Novi Ligure, Kingdom of Italy
- Died: 7 October 2014 (aged 76); Rome, Italy
- Other names: Rick Boyd
- Occupation: Actor

Federico Boido (8 January 1938 – 7 October 2014) was an Italian film actor who appeared in many horror films, Spaghetti Westerns, and sword and sandal movies. He also acted in the Sadistik photo novels and related his experiences in the film The Diabolikal Super-Kriminal.

Boido was born in Novi Ligure, and made his film debut at the age of 26. He appeared in over fifty films, including Planet of the Vampires (1965), Danger: Diabolik (1968), Spirits of the Dead (1968), Roy Colt and Winchester Jack (1970), and Superfly TNT (1973). He had roles in numerous Italian westerns, including several appearances in the Sartana series.

Throughout his film career, he used a variety of screen names, such as Rico Boido, Rich Boyd, Rick Boyd, Rik Boyd, and Ryck Boyd. He died in Ostia, Rome, aged 76.

== Filmography ==
- 1964: Hercules and the Treasure of the Incas as 'Tex'
- 1965: Agent 3S3: Passport to Hell as Man In Vienna Bar (uncredited)
- 1965: Maciste, the Avenger of the Mayans as Ulmar Guard
- 1965: The Dirty Game as Sernas' Henchman At First Meeting With Ferrari (uncredited)
- 1965: Planet of the Vampires as Keir
- 1965: Thrilling (segment "L'autostrada del sole")
- 1966: Djurado as Tucan Henchman (uncredited)
- 1967: The Seventh Floor as Guest At Pajama Party (uncredited)
- 1967: Renegade Riders as Fred Calhoun
- 1967: Django Kills Softly as The Nervous One
- 1967: Cjamango as Rowdy 'El Tigre Rowdy'
- 1967: Halleluja for Django as Jarrett Gang Member
- 1967: Bang Bang Kid (1967) as 'Sixfingers' Sykes (uncredited)
- 1967: Face to Face as Sheriff of Purgatory City (uncredited)
- 1968: Danger: Diabolik as Joe, Valmont's Henchman
- 1968: The Ruthless Four as Alfred Brady
- 1968: Spirits of the Dead as Party Guest (segment "Toby Dammit") (uncredited)
- 1968: I Want Him Dead
- 1968: A Sky Full of Stars for a Roof as Roger Pratt
- 1968: Run, Man, Run as Steve Wilkins
- 1968: Ace High as Drake's Blond Henchman
- 1969: Fellini Satyricon as Scar-Faced Leader (uncredited)
- 1969: I am Sartana, Your Angel of Death as Bill Cochram
- 1969: I diavoli della guerra as Willy Wendt
- 1969: Angels from 2000 as Drug Addict
- 1970: Rangers: attacco ora X as Private McGregor
- 1970: Django Defies Sartana as 1st Gunman (uncredited)
- 1970: Wind from the East
- 1970: Sartana's Here... Trade Your Pistol for a Coffin as Joe Fossit
- 1970: Roy Colt & Winchester Jack as Boida / Blondie
- 1970: Adiós, Sabata as Geroll
- 1970: Have a Good Funeral, My Friend... Sartana Will Pay as Jim Piggot
- 1970: Chapaqua's Gold as Billy George (uncredited)
- 1970: Sartana in the Valley of Death
- 1971: Tre nel mille
- 1971: They Call Me Hallelujah as 'Duke' Slocum
- 1971: Joe Dakota as Chuck
- 1971: His Name Was King as Sam Benson
- 1971: Terrible Day of the Big Gundown as Peter Fargas
- 1971: Return of Sabata as Gunman (uncredited)
- 1971: Drummer of Vengeance as Burt
- 1971: They Call Him Cemetery as Ambusher (uncredited)
- 1971: Trastevere as Hippie At St. Maria In Trastevere (uncredited)
- 1971: Holy Water Joe as Gunman (uncredited)
- 1972: His Name Was Holy Ghost as Burt Crow
- 1972: Two Brothers in Trinity as Blondie
- 1972: Lo chiamavano verità
- 1972: Where the Bullets Fly
- 1973: Canterbury n° 2' Nuove storie d'amore del '300 as Aldo
- 1973: Amico mio, frega tu... che frego io! as Teddy
- 1973: Halleluja to Vera Cruz
- 1973: Super Fly T.N.T. as Rik, Mercenary
- 1973: Ci risiamo, vero Provvidenza? as Blonde Guy With Shotgun
- 1973: The Fighting Fist of Shanghai Joe as 'Slim'
- 1974: Brigitte, Laura, Ursula, Monica, Raquel, Litz, Florinda, Barbara, Claudia, e Sofia le chiamo tutte... anima mia as Gunman
- 1976: Apache Woman as Keith
- 1977: Death Hunt as Duilio Brogi
- 1985: Joan Lui as Medico
- 1988: Dear Gorbachev
- 2001: Zana as Shpend (final film role)
