= Aldo Addobbati =

Italian film producer

Aldo Addobbati was an Italian film producer. In 1968 he produced Gianfranco Parolini's Se incontri Sartana prega per la tua morte, a western starring Gianni Garko, William Berger, Fernando Sancho and Klaus Kinski. He followed this by producing another of Parolini's and Kinski's in 1969 with the war picture 5 per l'inferno and he also co-produced the western Sono Sartana, il vostro becchino with Paolo Moffa. The film was directed by Giuliano Carnimeo and starred Gianni Garko.

== Filmography ==
- The Fantastic Three (1967)
- Se incontri Sartana prega per la tua morte (1968)
- 5 per l'inferno (1969)
- Dio perdoni la mia pistola (1969)
- Sono Sartana, il vostro becchino (1969)
- Afrika (1973)
