= Roy Colt & Winchester Jack =

1970 film

- Italian film poster by Rodolfo Gasparri
- Directed by: Mario Bava
- Screenplay by: Mario di Nardo
- Produced by: Mario Bregni
- Starring: Brett Halsey; Marilù Tolo; Charles Southwood; Teodoro Corra; Guido Lollobrigida; Bruno Corazzari; Mauro Bosco; Isa Miranda
- Cinematography: Antonio Rinaldi
- Edited by: Olga Pedrini
- Music by: Piero Umiliani
- Color process: Eastmancolor
- Production companies: Produzioni Atlas Consorziate; Tigielle 33
- Distributed by: Produzioni Atlas Consorziate
- Release date: 30 August 1970 (Italy)
- Country: Italy
- Language: Italian
- Box office: £263.386 million (Italy)

Roy Colt & Winchester Jack is a 1970 Italian Spaghetti Western film directed by Mario Bava and starring Brett Halsey, Marilù Tolo, Charles Southwood and Isa Miranda.

== Plot ==
Gunslingers Roy Colt and Winchester Jack fail to make a living through crime and Roy dissolves the partnership to earn an honest buck in Carson City as a sheriff. Sheriff Roy is then entrusted by the townsfolk with a replica of a treasure map said to lead to a fortune in buried gold, and his old partner Jack and a gang of desperados try to get to it first.

== Cast ==
- Brett Halsey as Roy Colt
- Marilù Tolo as Manila
- Charles Southwood as Winchester Jack
- Teodoro Corrà as The Reverend
- Federico Boido as Blondie
- Mauro Bosco as Bellatreccia ('Braid' in the English dub)
- Isa Miranda as Mammola ('Violet')
- Guido Lollobrigida as Canne ('Shotgun')
- Bruno Corazzari as Horsetooth
- Piero Morgia as Sandy
- Franco Pesce as Old Checkers Player
- Vincenzo Crocitti as Deaf Man
- Giorgio Gargullio as Samuel Lewis

== Production ==
Roy Colt & Winchester Jack was Produzioni Atlas Consorziate producer Mario Bregni's reward for director Mario Bava after he rescued the film Five Dolls for an August Moon. The screenplay was written by Mario di Nardo, who had also written Five Dolls, a script which Bava did not care for.

Bava biographer Tim Lucas commented that following the release of Once Upon a Time in the West in 1968, Spaghetti Westerns seemed to be in competition with regard to which film could come up with the most flagrantly bizarre characters and situations. This led to Spaghetti Westerns featuring martial arts, exploitive scenes of rape and gore, and gothic themes. These extremities led to Bava approaching Roy Colt & Winchester Jack as a broad spoof of the genre. Lead actor Brett Halsey, who had become friendly with Bava during the shooting of their previous film together, the sex comedy Four Times That Night, stated that it became a comedy as "the script wasn't very good; it kind of lent itself to having fun with it", and revealed that Bava had the idea of playing the film for laughs as early as signing on the cast. Lucas felt that despite being described as a comedy, the film "more correctly belongs to the category of farce or satire", stating that it resembles a Mad magazine sketch that pokes fun at the traditions of Westerns, in contrast to being a film with a straightforward narrative and humorous dialogue.

Charles Southwood stated that Roy Colt & Winchester Jack was "the best thing I did over [in Italy]" and stated that the film was improvised on a day-by-day basis. Southwood continued that "everyone contributed ideas. It was hilarity every morning. We'd make up scenes in the trailer!"

The credits of the film state that it was filmed at De Paolis Studios, but Halsey believes that only the interiors were shot there as he did not recall De Paolis having any standing Western town, and believes the town scenes may have been shot at Cinecittà as the studios were close to each other.

== Release ==
Roy Colt & Winchester Jack was distributed by PAC in Italy on August 13, 1970. It premiered in Rome in the same month. By the end of its Italian run, the film had grossed 263,386,000 Italian lira, making it the 22nd highest-grossing Spaghetti Western released there that year. Lucas noted that it was not until the success of the humorous Western They Call Me Trinity before the film received an international release and was acquired by Spanish, West German and American distributors in 1972.

In the United States, the film was acquired by Cinevision Films, which was also the distributor of Four Times that Night and a production partner in Bava's later film Baron Blood, but with the possible exception of one or two minor playdates to qualify for a tax break, the film appears to have gone unreleased in the United States. Alfredo Leone, the film's rights holder, expressed doubt that more than a few prints of the English-dubbed version were ever struck, and when the film was prepared for its American DVD release in 2002, no print or negative of the English dub was found to exist. The film was released by Image Entertainment in the United States on DVD.

== Reception ==
In his biography on Bava, Lucas commented that the film "involves a deliberate element of grotesquery, resulting sometimes overbearing exaggerations of nature, overstated action and distorted performances that are all too easy to interpret unfavorably", and that the film "contains more artless shots than any other Bava film".

== See also ==
- List of Italian films of 1970
