= Where the Bullets Fly (1972 film) =

1972 film

- Directed by: Sergio Grieco
- Written by: Sergio Grieco; Romano Migliorini; Gianbattista Musetto
- Produced by: Giovanni Addessi
- Starring: Antonio Sabàto; Marisa Mell; Lionel Stander
- Cinematography: Aldo De Roberts
- Edited by: Carlo Reali
- Music by: Guycen
- Release date: 1972

Where the Bullets Fly (Italian: Tutti fratelli nel west... per parte di padre, German: Fünf Klumpen Gold, Spanish: Todos hermanos en el Oeste), also known as All the Brothers of the West Support Their Father, is a 1972 Spaghetti Western-comedy film co-written and directed by Sergio Grieco and starring Antonio Sabàto, Marisa Mell and Lionel Stander.

== Cast ==
- Antonio Sabàto as Jonathan 'Jeepo' Poe
- Marisa Mell as Lulu Belle
- Lionel Stander as Lucky Capone
- Peter Carsten as Tom Slattery
- Fernando Sancho as General Hotshoto
- Giacomo Furia as Gennarino
- Esmeralda Barros as Pigsty's girl
- Franco Pesce as Pigsty
- Franco Ressel as Red Temple
- Brigitte Skay as the blonde prostitute
- Rick Boido as Capone's henchman
- Andrea Scotti as Hotshoto's henchman
- Antonio Gradoli as Governor
- Carla Mancini as a city dweller

== Production ==
The film is an Italian-West German-Spanish co-production by DC7, Terra Filmkunst, and Copercines. It was mainly shot in Mazzano Romano, north of Rome. It had the working title Là dove volano le pallottole.

== Reception ==
A contemporary Corriere della Sera review noted the film "tries to reshuffle the deck to refresh the western by grafting in a touch of the grotesque", but "the attempt falls flat because it lacks flair and inventiveness." Marco Giusti described the film as "crude, not even very funny", with a badly assembled cast and "a somewhat hackneyed premise.".
