= The Heroes (1973 film) =

- Directed by: Duccio Tessari
- Written by: Sergio Donati; Luciano Vincenzoni
- Starring: Rod Steiger; Rod Taylor
- Cinematography: Carlo Carlini
- Edited by: Mario Morra
- Music by: Riz Ortolani
- Distributed by: United Artists
- Release dates: 1973 (Italy); 1974 (UK)
- Running time: 105 minutes
- Countries: Italy; France; Spain
- Language: Italian
- Budget: $2,350,000

The Heroes (also known as Gli eroi, Les héros and Los héroes millonarios) is a 1973 Italian war-comedy film directed by Duccio Tessari.

== Cast ==
- Rod Steiger as Guenther von Lutz
- Rosanna Schiaffino as Katrin
- Rod Taylor as Bob Robson
- Claude Brasseur as Raphael Tilbaudet
- Terry-Thomas as John Cooper
- Gianni Garko as Schreiber
- Aldo Giuffrè as Spartaco Amore
- Ángel Aranda as Cowlich
- Nino Segurini as German soldier
- Miguel Bosé as German soldier
- Antonio Pica as Dietrich
- Lucia Bosé (cameo)

== Production ==
Yul Brynner was announced to play the lead but pulled out.

Part of the film production was done in the Egyptian Western Desert, several miles near the pyramid of Mydoom. A small Carson City, Nevada was built with river Nile mud on a woven reed and palm baskets but looked authentic from a distance. The city was full scale at the entrance but half-scale behind it.
