= The Island Princess (film) =

1954 film

- Directed by: Paolo Moffa; Carlos Serrano de Osma
- Written by: Juan del Río Ayala
- Starring: Silvana Pampanini
- Cinematography: Enzo Serafin
- Edited by: Eraldo Da Roma
- Music by: Franco Ferrara
- Release date: 1954
- Running time: 83 minutes
- Countries: Italy; Spain
- Language: Italian

The Island Princess (Italian: La principessa delle Canarie) is a 1954 Italian-Spanish adventure film directed by Paolo Moffa.

== Plot ==
The story takes place in 15th-century Spain. Canarian forces rise against Castile. Backup troops arrive on the island of Gran Canaria for aid due to the rising power of the Grancanarians. However, opinions about the war differ in the royal class. Guanarteme, the king and his daughter want peace. On the other hand, the warrior leader and the high priest want war.

One day, Castilian officer Don Hernán falls in love with the king's daughter, despite the difference in their status. The high priest poisons the king fatally, and then tries to marry the princess. Soon after, the embassy of Castile, including Don Hernán, arrives for peace. His confession of love causes war in his camp.

The princess and the high priest marry, despite the Castilian troops advance. The princess runs away with the high priest to the mountains of Tirma. Don Hernán follows them and does not let the princess fall off the cliffs with the high priest. However, she is disgusted by him and utters the torn Guanche oath.

== Cast ==
- Silvana Pampanini as Almadena
- Marcello Mastroianni as Don Diego
- Gustavo Rojo as Bentejui
- José María Lado as High priest
- Elvira Quintillá as Tasirga
- José María Rodero as Don Alvaro
- Félix de Pomés as Guanazteml

== Production ==
The film was shot in the Canary Islands. Subsequently, Mastroiani recalled the shooting: “Hellish heat! And then there are weapons, horses, and everything else that I have never dealt with. Moreover, these horses (which I gave to the “princess” on behalf of the King of Spain) had neither tails, nor manes, so they had to fix them with ropes. Crazy work! .. "
