= Fernando Sancho =

Spanish actor (1916–1990)

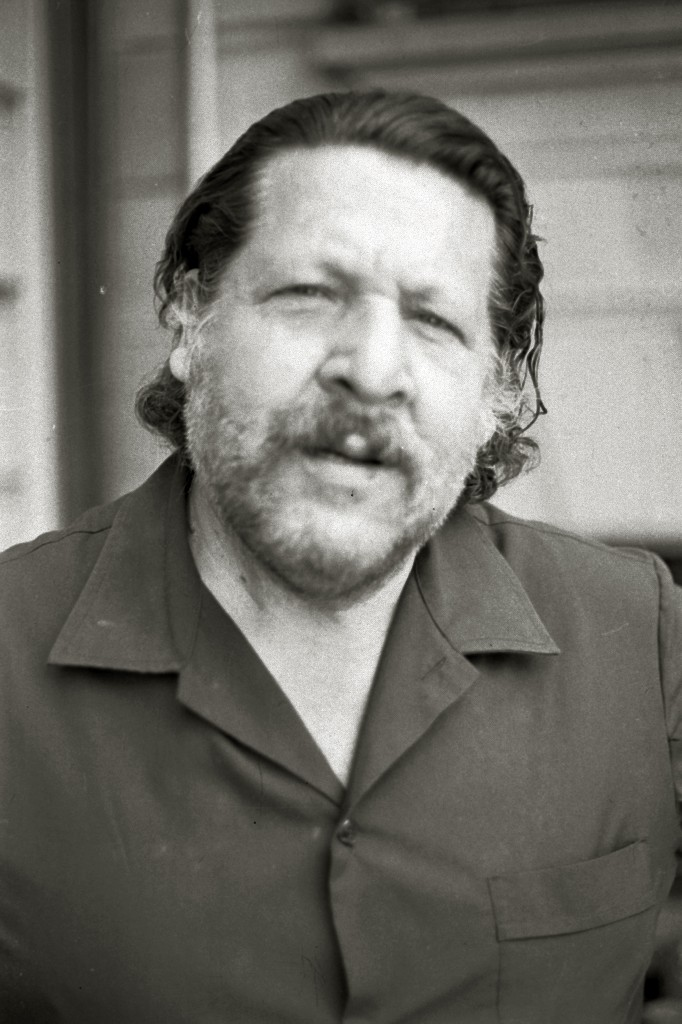
- Fernando Sancho in 1970 at the Festival de San Sebastián
- Born: Fernando Sancho Les; 7 January 1916; Zaragoza, Spain
- Died: 31 July 1990 (aged 74); Madrid, Spain
- Occupation: Actor
- Years active: 1941-1990

Fernando Sancho Les (7 January 1916 – 31 July 1990) was a Spanish actor.

== Biography ==
He was born in Zaragoza, in Aragon, Spain on 7 January 1916 and died at Hospital Militar Gómez Ulla in Madrid on 31 July 1990 from a liver failure during or following surgery to remove a malignant tumor in the pancreas. He was interred in Madrid.

Fernando Sancho fought in the Spanish Civil War on the rebel side, being wounded several times and achieving the rank of lieutenant in the Legion.

== Career ==
He was often typecast as a Mexican bandit in Spaghetti Westerns, including The Big Gundown (directed by Sergio Sollima), A Pistol for Ringo and Return of Ringo (directed by Duccio Tessari), Arizona Colt (directed by Michele Lupo), Minnesota Clay (directed by Sergio Corbucci), and Sartana (directed by Gianfranco Parolini). He also appeared in a number of Spanish horror movies in the 1960s and 1970s. One of his better known horror parts was the role of a corrupt small-town mayor in Return of the Blind Dead (El ataque de los muertos sin ojos), directed by Amando de Ossorio.

Another notable horror film was Orloff and the Invisible Man (1971), directed by Pierre Chevalier and starring Howard Vernon, an unofficial continuation of the Dr. Orloff saga begun by Jess Franco in The Awful Dr. Orloff (1962).

He turned up briefly in the epic film Lawrence of Arabia playing the Turkish sergeant who arrests T. E. Lawrence in Deraa. He appeared in five Greek war movies (1970–73); three of these involved World War II (i.e., Battle of Crete, Greek Resistance, Fort Roupel) and the other two involved the Greek War of Independence and the resistance of Souliotes against Ali Pasha.

Sancho had a prolific career and remained active in films up to his death.

== Awards ==
He won the Medallas del Círculo de Escritores Cinematográficos for La guerrilla in 1972, and in 1980 for all his career.

== Selected filmography ==
- ¡Polizón a bordo! (1941) - Camarero
- Orosia (1944) - Mañico bronquista
- Una mujer en un taxi (1944)
- Ni pobre, ni rico, sino todo lo contrario (1944)
- Estaba escrito (1945)
- Leyenda de feria (1946)
- Eres un caso (1946)
- Las inquietudes de Shanti Andía (1947) - Tristán de Ugarte
- Héroes del 95 (1947) - General Tampico
- Abel Sánchez (1947)
- Mariona Rebull (1947) - Señor Roig
- When the Angels Sleep (1947) - Peral
- El ángel gris (1947)
- The Black Siren (1947) - Mayordomo
- Alma baturra (1948)
- Mi enemigo el doctor (1948)
- Embrujo (1948) - Mister Benson
- El tambor del Bruch (1948)
- La muralla feliz (1948) - Mariano García
- Canción mortal (1948)
- La mies es mucha (1948) - Clarenberg
- Campo Bravo (1948)
- Don Juan de Serrallonga (1949) - Tallaferro
- Aquellas palabras (1949)
- Vida en sombras (1949) - Productor
- Cita con mi viejo corazón (1950)
- That Luzmela Girl (1950)
- Si te hubieses casado conmigo (1950) - Taxista
- Agustina of Aragon (1950)
- La mujer de nadie (1950) - Martorell
- The Dream of Andalusia (1951)
- Service at Sea (1951) - Don Tofol
- Our Lady of Fatima (1951) - Comunista 1
- The Great Galeoto (1951) - Vizconde de Nebreda
- Dawn of America (1951) - Pedro Salcedo
- From Madrid to Heaven (1952) - Empresario de 'El Paraíso'
- The Eyes Leave a Trace (1952) - Comensal irascible
- The Song of Sister Maria (1952) - Rafael
- Sor Intrépida (1952) - Mr. Evans
- Estrella of the Sierra Morena (1952) - Rafael
- Last Day (1952) - Profesor Lorenzo
- María Dolores (1953) - Antonio
- La alegre caravana (1953)
- Airport (1953) - Mr. Fogg
- I Was a Parish Priest (1953) - Barrona
- Plot on the Stage (1953) - Policía 1º
- The Beauty of Cadiz (1953) - Pere gitane
- Nadie lo sabrá (1953) - Ángel
- Judas' Kiss (1954) - Padre del condenado
- The Adventurer of Seville (1954) - Sir Albert
- Castles in Spain (1954) - Posadero
- He Died Fifteen Years Ago (1954) - Joaquín Campos
- Tres hombres van a morir (1954) - Peauleguin
- The Other Life of Captain Contreras (1955) - Antonio Cornejo
- That Lady (1955) - Diego
- Death of a Cyclist (1955) - Guardia de tráfico
- Suspenso en comunismo (1956) - Pedro
- Cuerda de presos (1956) - Juan Díaz de Garayo, 'El Sacamantecas'
- Torrepartida (1956) - El Alicantino
- Pasión en el mar (1956) - Vicente
- Horas de pánico (1957)
- Der Stern von Afrika (1957) - Strauch
- Susanna Whipped Cream (1957) - Giovanni
- Femmine tre volte (1957) - Guardia notturna
- ...Y eligió el infierno (1957)
- El inquilino (1958) - Jiménez
- Io, mammeta e tu (1958) - Turco
- Let's Make the Impossible! (1958) - John
- Gli zitelloni (1958)
- Die Sklavenkarawane (1958) - Prof. Ignaz Pfotenhauer
- Patio andaluz (1958)
- La ragazza di piazza San Pietro (1958) - The Boxing Coach
- Entierro de un funcionario en primavera (1958) - Jefe de bomberos
- Luxury Cabin (1959) - Ernesto
- Llegaron dos hombres (1959) - Gregorio
- Der Löwe von Babylon (1959) - Prof. Ignaz Pfotenhauer
- A sangre fría (1959) - Enrique
- El secreto de papá (1959)
- Toro bravo (1960)
- The Little Colonel (1960) - Vinagre
- El indulto (1960) - El Maroma
- La paz empieza nunca (1960) - Mirín
- Taxi for Tobruk (1961) - German Corporal in the Oasis
- Goliath Against the Giants (1961) - Namathos
- Alerta en el cielo (1961) - Sargento Montebelo
- El pobre García (1961) - Elías
- King of Kings (1961) - the demon-possessed man
- Madame (1961) - Pommier
- My Son, the Hero (1962)
- Zorro the Avenger (1962) - Sargento
- The Son of Captain Blood (1962) - Timothy Thomas
- The Carpet of Horror (1962) - Gunman
- I tromboni di Fra Diavolo (1962) - Mammone
- Lawrence of Arabia (1962) - Turkish Sergeant (uncredited)
- Magic Fountain (1963) - Priest
- 55 Days at Peking (1963) - Belgian Minister
- The Sign of the Coyote (1963) - Lugones Brother
- Tres hombres buenos (1963) - Diego Abriles
- No temas a la ley (1963) - Eugenio - Le patron de l'hôtel
- The Secret of the Black Widow (1963) - Slim
- The Ceremony (1963) - Shaoush
- José María (1963)
- El precio de un asesino (1963) - Rufo
- Three Ruthless Ones (1964) - Pedro Ramirez
- Two Gangsters in the Wild West (1964) - Rio
- Backfire (1964) - Ilmaz
- Black Angel of the Mississippi (1964) - Garcia
- Crimen (1964) - El Juez
- The Seven from Texas (1964) - Scometti, the half-breed
- Minnesota Clay (1964) - Gen. Domingo Ortiz
- Gunmen of the Rio Grande (1964) - Pancho Bogan
- La nueva Cenicienta (1964) - Fernando
- I due toreri (1964) - Don Alonso
- Toto of Arabia (1965) - Ali el Buzur
- Historias de la televisión (1965) - Presentador TV
- A Pistol for Ringo (1965) - Sancho
- Los cuatreros (1965) - Pancho
- Two Sergeants of General Custer (1965) - Colonel Dolukin
- Pistoleros de Arizona (1965) - Carrancho
- Agent 3S3: Passport to Hell (1965) - Serg. Fidhouse
- Agent 077: From the Orient with Fury (1965) - Loud Patron in Paris Restaurant
- Wild Kurdistan (1965) - Padischah
- Man from Canyon City (1965) - Carrancho
- 100.000 dollari per Ringo (1965) - Chuck
- Doc, Hands of Steel (1965) - Pablo Reyes
- The Return of Ringo (1965) - Esteban Fuentes
- Kingdom of the Silver Lion (1965) - Padischah
- Seven Guns for the MacGregors (1966) - Miguel
- Seven Dollars on the Red (1966) - El Cachal / Sancho
- Seven Magnificent Guns (1966) - Sancho Rodrigo Rodriguez
- The Almost Perfect Crime (1966) - Omar
- Agent 3S3: Massacre in the Sun (1966) - General Emilio Siqueiros
- Per il gusto di uccidere (1966) - Sanchez
- Dynamite Jim (1966) - Pablo Reyes
- Arizona Colt (1966) - Torrez Gordo Watch
- Il vostro super agente Flit (1966) - Smirnoff
- Django Shoots First (1966) - Gordon
- The Big Gundown (1966) - Captain Segura
- Il grande colpo di Surcouf (1966) - Le geôlier
- The Tough One (1966)
- Clint the Stranger (1967) - Ross
- Ten Thousand Dollars for a Massacre (1967) - Stardust Vasquez
- Wanted Johnny Texas (1967) - Colonel Steward - Texas Rangers
- Come rubare un quintale di diamanti in Russia (1967) - Prof. Higgins
- Odio per odio (1967) - Coyote
- El rostro del asesino (1967) - Suarez
- Dakota Joe (1967) - Don Carlos
- Killer Kid (1967) - Vilar
- If One Is Born a Swine (1967) - El Bicho
- Massacre Mania (1967) - Professor Kenitz
- Vengeance Is Mine (1967) - Concalves
- Crónica de un atraco (1968) - Fernando Gonzales
- Go for Broke (1968) - Carranza
- Sangue chiama sangue (1968) - 'El Sancho' Rodríguez
- Rita of the West (1968) - Pancho
- If You Meet Sartana Pray for Your Death (1968) - Jose Manuel Mendoza
- Requiem for a Gringo (1968) - Porfirio Carranza
- Wrath of God (1968) - Burd
- The Magnificent Tony Carrera (1968) - Einstein
- Ciccio Forgives, I Don't (1968) - El Dablo / El Pantera
- Tarzan in the Golden Grotto (1969)
- Twenty Thousand Dollars for Seven (1969) - Bill Cochran, capo dei banditi
- Amor a todo gas (1969) - Wagner
- Simón Bolívar (1969) - Fernando González
- Franco, Ciccio e il pirata Barbanera (1969) - Il Pirata Barbanera
- La banda de los tres crisantemos (1970) - Burton
- Golpe de mano (Explosión) (1970) - El Pernas
- In the Folds of the Flesh (1970) - Pascal Gorriot
- The Boldest Job in the West (1970) - Ramón Sartana
- Orloff Against the Invisible Man (1970) - Le garde-chasse
- In the Battle of Crete (1970) - Manousos Kallergis
- 28 October 1940 (1971) - Tryfonas Platanias
- Dig Your Grave Friend... Sabata's Coming (1971) - León Pompero
- Los buitres cavarán tu fosa (1971) - Pancho Corrales
- X312 - Flight to Hell (1971) - Bill - Steward / Paco
- The Great Moment of the Greek War of Independence: Papaflessas (1971) - Mahmud Dramali Pasha
- The Boldest Job in the West (1972) - Reyes
- Timanfaya (Amor prohibido) (1972)
- Watch Out Gringo! Sabata Will Return (1972) - Carrancho
- You Are a Traitor and I'll Kill You! (1972) - Sebastian
- La caza del oro (1972) - Fermín Rojas
- Where the Bullets Fly (1972)
- Fabulous Trinity (1972) - Coronel Jiménez
- Souliotes (1972) - Ali Pasas
- Las juergas de 'El Señorito' (1973) - Toni López
- The Guerrilla (1973) - Juan
- The Last of Rupel (1973)
- Three Supermen of the West (1973) - FBI Director
- Return of the Blind Dead (1973) - Mayor Duncan
- Storia di karatè, pugni e fagioli (1973) - Espartero
- Man with the Golden Winchester (1973) - Colonel Michel Leblanche
- El pantano de los cuervos (1974) - Inspector
- The King is the Best Mayor (1974) - Conde
- Il mio nome è Scopone e faccio sempre cappotto (1974) - Aguadulce
- Voodoo Black Exorcist (1974) - Comisario Domínguez
- Los caballeros del Botón de Ancla (1974) - Andrés Dopico
- Death's Newlyweds (1975) - Comandante Lauria
- The Possessed (1975) - Police Chief
- La cruz del diablo (1975) - Ignacio
- What Changed Charley Farthing? (1975) - Lupez
- La última jugada (1975) - Swartas Pinto
- Los casados y la menor (1975) - Comisario
- The Legion Like Women (1976) - André Meroy
- El alijo (1976) - Paco
- Memoria (1976) - Profesor Ulop
- Halt die Luft an alter Gauner - Der Stockfisch und das Stinktier (1976) - Admiral Pedro Santos
- Las alimañas (1977) - Louis
- La mujer es un buen negocio (1977) - Don Anselmo
- Change of Sex (1977) - José Bou, padre de José María
- The Perfect Killer (1977) - The Arms Dealer
- Doña Perfecta (1977)
- The Last Duel (1977) - Thai film
- Estimado Sr. juez... (1978) - Tambarria
- Trampa sexual (1978) - Padre de Marta
- Venus de fuego (1978) - Subcomisario
- Zwei tolle Käfer räumen auf (1979) - Alfonso, Mafia-Boss
- Father Cami's Wedding (1979) - Blas
- Las siete magníficas y audaces mujeres (1979)
- And in the Third Year, He Rose Again (1980) - Coronel
- Spoiled Children (1980) - Agustín
- El lobo negro (1981)
- Asalto al casino (1981)
- Revenge of the Black Wolf (1981) - Corporal Donovan
- Black Commando (1982) - President Bethancourt
- Fredy el croupier (1982) - Cura
- De camisa vieja a chaqueta nueva (1982) - Cónsul alemán
- Mar brava (1983) - Alcalde
- 1919, crónica del alba (1983) - Don Hermógenes
- The Autonomines (1983) - Bernardo
- Invierno en Marbella (1983) - Cardenal
- Al este del oeste (1984) - Chapulín
- The Cheerful Colsada Girls (1984) - Sr. Barbero
- The Heifer (1985) - Alcalde
- Los presuntos (1986) - Mafioso italiano
- Policía (1987) - Comandante Castillejo
- La luna negra (1989) - Mariano
