= His Name Was Holy Ghost =

1972 film

- Directed by: Giuliano Carnimeo
- Written by: Tito Carpi; Federico De Urrutia
- Produced by: Luciano Martino
- Starring: Gianni Garko; Pilar Velázquez
- Cinematography: Miguel Fernández Mila
- Music by: Bruno Nicolai
- Release date: 1972
- Language: Italian

His Name Was Holy Ghost (Italian: Uomo avvisato mezzo ammazzato... parola di Spirito Santo, Spanish: ...Y le llamaban El Halcón, also known as They Call Him Holy Ghost and El halcón de Sierra Madre) is a 1972 Italian-Spanish Spaghetti Western film directed by Giuliano Carnimeo and starring Gianni Garko, and is the follow-up to They Call Him Cemetery. It received a belated UK release in 1976 under the title Blazing Guns as a supporting film to Monsters From an Unknown Planet.

== Plot ==
A mysterious stranger named Holy Ghost joins forces with a beautiful Mexican revolutionary girl and her father to overthrow a ruthless general and rescue a man who knows the location of a mine, which has been won by Holy Ghost in a poker game.

== Cast ==
- Gianni Garko as Holy Ghost
- Pilar Velázquez as Juana Mendoza
- Paul Stevens as Samuel Crow
- Víctor Israel as The Priest
- Poldo Bendandi as General Ubarte
- Cris Huerta as Carezza
- Jorge Rigaud as Don Firmino Mednoza
- Nello Pazzafini as Colonel
- Fortunato Arena as Colonel Matadodos
- Aldo Barberito as Friar John
- Carlo Gaddi as Captain Fiesta
- Franco Pesce as Engineer Hernandez
- Rick Boyd as Vern Crohn
- Monica Altomonte
- Salvatore Baccaro as Spirito Santo's Men
- Pietro Ceccarelli
- Pasquale Coletta
- Maria D'Incoronato
- Gildo Di Marco as Spirito Santo's Men
- Evi Farinelli as Wendy
- Lina Ferri
- Dada Gallotti as May
- Mario Gas
- Italo Guitto
- Gianclaudio Jabes as Spirito Santo's Men
- Carla Mancini
- Furio Meniconi
- Ricardo Moyán as Drunk
- César Ojinaga as Soldier
- José Palomo as Fight Spectator
- Riccardo Petrazzi
- Mimmo Poli as Barman
- Gianni Pulone
- Moisés Augusto Rocha as Boxing coach
- Thomas Rudy as Lieutenant
- Claudio Ruffini as Poker Player
- Amerigo Santarelli as Spirito Santo's Men
- Maurizio Tocchi
- Juan Torres as Esteban
- Fredy Unger as Cpt. Ortega
- Ettore Arena as Soldier
- Mario Dardanelli as Soldier
- Roberto Dell'Acqua as Card Player
- Alberigo Donadeo as Soldier of General Ubarte
- Marcello Meconizzi as Ubarte Soldier

== See also ==
- List of Italian films of 1972
- List of Spanish films of 1972
