= Five for Hell =

1969 film by Gianfranco Parolini

Five for Hell (Cinque per l'inferno)
- Spanish DVD cover
- Directed by: Frank Kramer
- Screenplay by: Renato Izzo; Gianfranco Parolini
- Story by: Sergio Garrone
- Produced by: Paolo Moffa; Aldo Addobbati
- Starring: John Garko; Margaret Lee; Klaus Kinski; Nick Jordan; Sal Borgese; Luciano Rossi; Sam Burke
- Cinematography: Sandro Mancori
- Edited by: Giuseppe Bellecca; Uncredited: Gianfranco Parolini
- Music by: Vasili Kojucharov; Elsio Mancuso
- Production companies: Società Ambrosiana Cinematografica (SAC); Filmstar
- Distributed by: Paris Etoile Film
- Release date: 18 January 1969
- Running time: 95 minutes
- Country: Italy
- Language: Italian

Five for Hell (Italian: Cinque per l'inferno, also known as Five Into Hell) is a 1969 Italian "macaroni combat" war film starring John Garko, Margaret Lee and Klaus Kinski. Italian cinema specialist Howard Hughes referred to it as a derivative of The Dirty Dozen (1967).

== Summary ==
Gianni Garko is a fun-loving leader of a bunch of oddball G.I.s whose mission is to steal the German's secret attack plans from a villa behind enemy lines, where they run into a brutal Nazi commander.

This film introduced, as it was typical in spaghetti combat films, a very particular and self parodic humour, using also elements inherited directly from the Spaghetti Western, such as the hero using eccentric and odd weaponry, such as an iron baseball.

== Cast ==
- Gianni Garko - Lt. Glenn Hoffmann (as John Garko)
- Margaret Lee - Helga Richter
- Klaus Kinski - SS-Obersturmbannführer Hans Müller
- Nick Jordan - Nick Amadori
- Sal Borgese - Al Siracusa
- Luciano Rossi - Johnny 'Chicken' White
- Samson Burke - Sgt. Sam McCarthy (as Sam Burke)
- Irio Fantini - Maj. Gen. Friedrich Gerbordstadt
- Biagio Gambini - Helga's Lover (uncredited)
- Mike Monty - Capt. Nixon (uncredited)
- Bill Vanders - American General (uncredited)
