= They Call Him Cemetery =

1971 film

They Call Me Cemetery
- Directed by: Giuliano Carnimeo
- Written by: Enzo Barboni
- Produced by: Mino Loy
- Starring: Gianni Garko; William Berger
- Cinematography: Stelvio Massi
- Music by: Bruno Nicolai
- Distributed by: Variety Distribution
- Release date: 1971
- Country: Italy
- Language: Italian

They Call Me Cemetery (Italian: Gli fumavano le Colt... lo chiamavano Camposanto, also known as His Pistols Smoked... They Call Him Cemetery and A Bullet for a Stranger) is a 1971 Italian Spaghetti Western film directed by Giuliano Carnimeo and starring Gianni Garko. It was followed by His Name Was Holy Ghost the following year, also starring Garko and directed by Carnimeo.

== Plot ==
Two brothers find themselves in serious trouble when they arrive in a small western town to visit their father and run afoul of the local gang. This lawless land offers no hope for our well-intentioned but hopeless outnumbered duo. The arrival of a mysterious stranger named Cemetery may prove to be beneficial for the good-natured brothers and their facing off against the ruthless gang and their leader Duke, a crafty hired gunslinger and nemesis of Cemetery.

== Cast ==
- Gianni Garko as Cemetery
- William Berger as Duke
- Chris Chittell as John McIntire
- John Fordyce as George McIntire
- Ugo Fangareggi as Sancho
- Raimondo Penne as Chico
- Franco Ressel as The Judge
- Aldo Barberito as Sheriff Toland
- Ivano Staccioli as Avelin
- Nello Pazzafini as Cobra Ramirez
- Ugo Adinolfi as Breeder
- Bill Vanders as Clay McIntire
- Federico Boido as Ambusher
- Pinuccio Ardia as Gunsmith
- Giovanni Di Benedetto as Douglas Toland
- Gildo Di Marco as Undertaker
