= Encounters in the Deep =

Incontri con gli umanoidi
- Italian theatrical release poster
- Directed by: Tonino Ricci
- Music by: Stelvio Cipriani
- Release date: 1979
- Countries: Italy; Spain; Mexico
- Language: Italian

Encounters in the Deep (Italian: Incontri con gli umanoidi, also known as Uragano sulle Bermude – L'ultimo S.O.S. – Spanish: Encuentro en el abismo), is a 1979 Italian / Spanish / Mexican film directed by Tonino Ricci (as Anthony Richmond) and starring Andrés García, Gianni Garko and Gabriele Ferzetti.

== Plot ==
United States, late 1970s. An engaged couple mysteriously disappears in the Bermuda Triangle. Her father wants to see clearly, and organizes an expedition to that area along with Mike. When they get there, they discover the presence of extraterrestrial communities, who are carrying out studies on the human race.

== Cast ==
- Andrés García as Scott
- Gianni Garko as Mike
- Gabriele Ferzetti as Miles
- Manuel Zarzo as Peters
- Alfredo Mayo as Pop
- Carole André as Mary

== Production ==
The film was partially shot in Dénia, Spain.
