= The Triumph of Robin Hood =

- Directed by: Umberto Lenzi
- Written by: Giancarlo Romitelli
- Produced by: Tiziano Longo
- Starring: Don Burnett; Gia Scala; Samson Burke
- Cinematography: Angelo Filippini
- Edited by: Nella Nannuzzi
- Music by: Aldo Piga
- Production company: Buona Vista
- Distributed by: Regionale
- Release date: 15 September 1962
- Running time: 86 minutes
- Country: Italy
- Language: Italian

The Triumph of Robin Hood (Italian: Il trionfo di Robin Hood) is a 1962 Italian adventure film directed by Umberto Lenzi and starring Don Burnett, Gia Scala and Samson Burke.

The film's sets were designed by the art director Giuseppe Ranieri. It was shot on location in Slovenia and Croatia.

== Plot ==
While King Richard continues his campaign in the Holy Land, his most loyal subjects back in England are led by Robin Hood. Together, Richard's subjects unite to gallantly resist against Baron Elwin, the Sheriff of Nottingham who seeks to enhance his standing with Prince John.

== Cast ==
- Don Burnett as Robin Hood
- Gia Scala as Anna
- Samson Burke as Little John
- Vincenzo Musolino as William Gamwell
- Gaia Germani as Isabella
- Arturo Dominici as Baron Elwin, Sheriff of Nottingham
- Enrico Luzi as Scully
- Daniela Igliozzi as Madeleine
- Vinicio Sofia as Sir Tristan of Goldsborough
- Gianni Solaro as Sir Goodman
- Maks Furijan as Sir Guy
- Nello Pazzafini as Black Peter
- Janez Vrhovec as John Lackland

== See also ==
- List of films and television series featuring Robin Hood

== Bibliography ==
- Roy Kinnard & Tony Crnkovich. Italian Sword and Sandal Films, 1908–1990. McFarland, 2017.
