= Sartana Kills Them All =

1970 film directed by Rafael Romero Marchent

- Spanish: Un par de asesinos
- Directed by: Rafael Romero Marchent
- Written by: Mario Alabiso; Rafael Romero Marchent
- Screenplay by: Santiago Moncada; Joaquín Romero Marchent
- Story by: Santiago Moncada; Joaquín Romero Marchent
- Cinematography: Guglielmo Mancori
- Edited by: Antonio Ramírez de Loaysa
- Music by: Marcello Giombini
- Production companies: Producciones Cinematográficas D.I.A.; Medusa Distribuzione; Tritone Cinematografica
- Distributed by: Columbia Film-Verleih; Medusa Distribuzione; Hispamex Films; Koch Media
- Release date: 11 September 1970
- Running time: 95 min
- Country: Spain

Sartana Kills Them All (Spanish: Un par de asesinos) is a 1970 Spanish crime comedy western film directed by Rafael Romero Marchent, written by Mario Alabiso and Santiago Moncada and starring Gianni Garko (reprising his role from the official Sartana film series), Guglielmo Spoletini and María Silva.

== Cast ==
- Gianni Garko as Sartana
- William Bogard as Marcos
- María Silva as María Anderson
- Andrés Mejuto as Richard Kirby
- Raf Baldassarre as Fred Burton
- Carlos Bravo as Adam Kirby
- Carlos Romero Marchent as Donald Kirby
- Cris Huerta as Deputy Smithy
- Cristina Iosani as Carmencita
- Álvaro de Luna as Patrick Kirby
- Jesús Guzmán as Storekeeper
- Luis Induni as Sheriff Laughton
- Jesús Aristu
- María Martín as Stagecoach Passenger
- Lorenzo Robledo as Deputy
- José Antonio Lopez as Frank Kirby
- Paco Sanz as Judge Parker
- Frank Braña as Brian Lester
- Antonio Calò as Gambling Man
- Fabián Conde as Tommy
- Alfonso Giganti as Croupier
- Alba Maiolini as Ines
- Romano Milani as Bill, croupier
- Joaquín Parra as Sheriff Sam
