= Sartana in the Valley of Death =

1970 film

- Directed by: Roberto Mauri
- Written by: Roberto Mauri
- Starring: William Berger
- Cinematography: Sandro Mancori
- Music by: Augusto Martelli
- Release date: 1970
- Country: Italy
- Language: Italian

Sartana in the Valley of Death (Italian: Sartana nella valle degli avvoltoi, also known as Ballad of Death Valley) is a 1970 Italian Spaghetti Western film written and directed by Roberto Mauri and starring William Berger.

== Cast ==
- William Berger as Lee Calloway / Sartana
- Wayde Preston as Anthony Douglas
- Aldo Berti as George Douglas
- Carlo Giordana as "Slim" Douglas
- Franco De Rosa as Peter Douglas
- Luciano Pigozzi as Paco
- Jolanda Modio as Juanita
- Pamela Tudor as Esther
- Federico Boido as "Slim" Craig
- Josiane Tanzilli as Carmencita
- Franco Ressel as Norton
