= Death (cigarette) =

British cigarette brand

- An old Finnish pack of Death cigarettes, with Finnish and Swedish text warnings at the bottom of the pack.
- Product type: Cigarette
- Produced by: Enlightened Tobacco Company
- Country: United Kingdom
- Introduced: 1991; 35 years ago
- Discontinued: 1999
- Markets: See Markets

Death was a British brand of cigarettes which was owned and manufactured by the Enlightened Tobacco Company in the United Kingdom from 1991 to 1999. It was conceived as a satirical statement on cigarette marketing and advertising, intended to criticize or reveal the true intent of cigarette marketing: namely, the idea that cigarettes were a product that, when consumed in the manner for which they had been manufactured, were essentially fatal and likely to contribute to the death of the person smoking them.

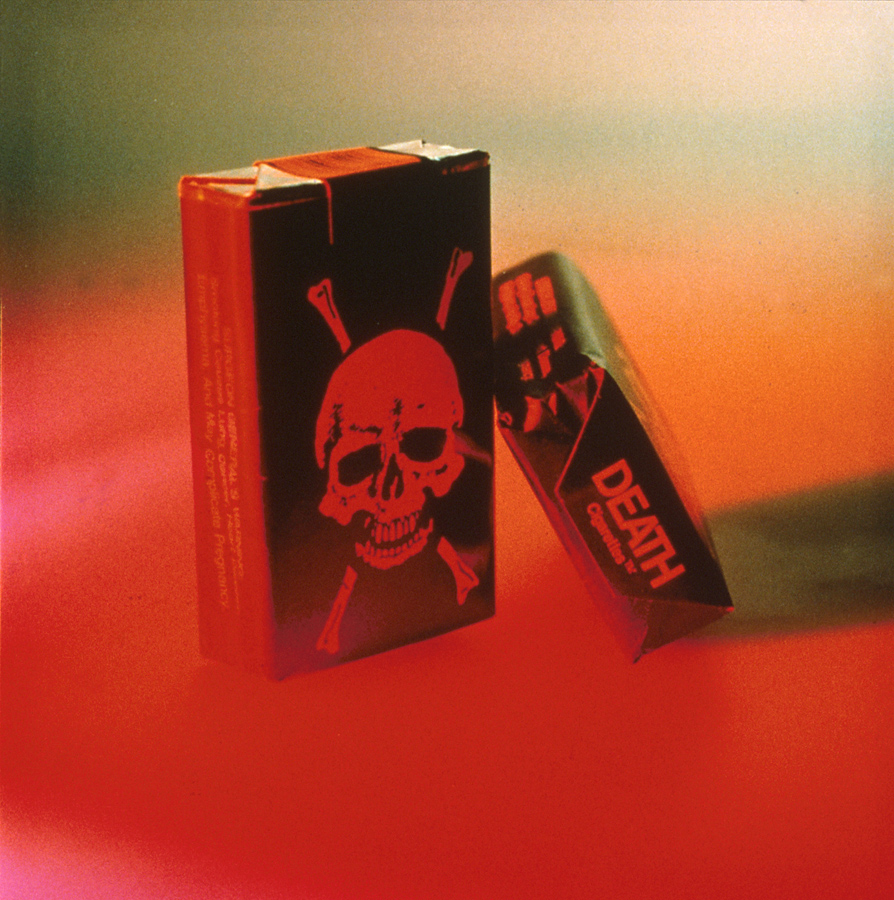
Death cigarettes

== History ==
Entrepreneur BJ Cunningham invested his life savings to create and market an additive-free smoking product called Death. He founded the Enlightened Tobacco Company in 1991. Its product disclosed its hazardous nature by prominently displaying skull and crossbones on its outer package and came in two varieties; Death, and Death Lights. The product was marketed to the "young underground punk rock" consumer market. The products were sold for a time via mail order from Luxembourg to avoid the United Kingdom's excise tax; however, after some time, the Customs and Excise department disallowed this sales channel.

=== The company ===
The company's plans to offer sponsorship to the Pacific Racing F1 in 1994 fell through after Roland Ratzenberger and Ayrton Senna were killed at the San Marino Grand Prix. That year the company was turned down by the "top five poster contractors" who would not provide the company with permission to use their sites because of its "blunt" marketing message and a pending parliamentary bill restricting tobacco advertising.

The company "was losing a million pounds per year" and could not afford a massive advertising campaign. The firm's trademark rights were successfully challenged by an alcohol company called Black Death. The impending lawsuit barred the sale of Death cigarettes and the company closed down.

== Markets ==
Death cigarettes were mainly sold in the United Kingdom, but were also sold in Ireland, the United States, Norway and Finland.
