= Andrea Addobbati =

Italian economic historian

Andrea Addobbati (born 29 September 1964) is an Italian economic historian. He is full professor of early modern history at the University of Pisa. He specializes in documenting the history of the nobility of Pisa and Tuscany and its economic history. He has highlighted the importance and financial significance of Jewish companies in Pisan history and is the author of an essay on the practical consequences of Tuscan trade during the American War of Independence.
