= The Old Man and the Old Moon =

American "play with music"

- Written by: PigPen Theatre Co.
- Music by: PigPen Theatre Co.
- Lyrics by: PigPen Theatre Co.

Premiere

The Old Man and the Old Moon is an American "play with music" written by PigPen Theatre Company. The play follows the Old Man, who is in charge of filling the Moon with light. After his wife is drawn away by a mysterious melody, he goes out on a sea faring adventure looking for her. The play first premiered Off-Broadway in 2012 and a revised version in 2014 at the New Victory Theater.

== Plot ==
The company of storytellers perform "Song from the Stone". Matheson, the play's narrator, offers to the audience the tale of why the Moon changes shape: there once was an Old Man whose job it was to fill the moon with liquid light. He lived a peaceful life with his wife, but they had lived so long they forgot why they needed to fill the moon. One day, the Old Woman hears a mysterious melody she associates with their forgotten past, and runs away to find its source. The Old Man chases after her ("The Rain Will Fall"). Learning she is heading west in a boat, the Old Man tries and fails to charter a boat due to having no money. The boat shop owner gives him the hat of his clerk Mickey, despite Mickey's protests that the hat belonged to his grandfather. The Old Man manages to board a warship when he is mistaken for the legendary First Naval Lieutenant Pericles Llewellyn McWallander by the ship's quartermaster Llewellyn, due to the hat ("The Sailor's Anthem"). However, the ship is actually headed south for war. The Old Man soon notices the Moon continues to lose its light without him performing his duty.

Matheson,the ship's first mate, tells the crew the tale of how Lieutenant McWallander sailed west in search of a mysterious city at the end of the world before his crew allegedly mutinied and threw him overboard. A rebel ship interrupts, and their captain is killed in the skirmish ("The Rain Will Fall (Reprise)"). Facing either certain death in war or desertion charges, the Old Man proposes they instead head west in search of the city: as he tries describing it, he is struck by a strange memory and tells them that the city is filled with liquid light. The crew sail westward ("Sail for Love"), but encounter several obstacles that cause the crew to lose faith in him. Matheson, aware the Old Man is lying, privately warns him not to take his crew for granted like McWallander did before.

At the port of Malefria, the Old Man learns his wife passed through recently from two former members of McWallander's mutinous crew. The Old Man forces his crew to continue west, and ends up sailing them straight through a field of volcanoes, severely damaging the ship and leading the cook to flee ("Sail for Love (Reprise)"). Matheson finally outs the Old Man, explaining he had served as McWallander's cabin boy as a child but let the Old Man keep up the charade because he "like[s] a good story." Just as the crew is ready to throw the Old Man overboard, the moon finally loses all of its light and a sudden storm destroys the ship, sending everyone into the sea. As the Old Man sinks ("Just Like the Sea") he is swallowed by a giant fish.

Awakening in its stomach, he encounters a strange castaway named Perry ("Prison Fish Interlude #1"). Perry reveals he ended up in the fish while he was on a quest to find the city of the light, only to be thrown overboard by his crew ("Prison Fish Interlude #2"). The Old Man figures out they can tear the fish apart from the inside by pulling at two ends of a particular bone, something he learned from his wife. Perry initially refuses to help, revealing to the stunned Old Man he is actually a ghost, and he has nothing to go home to. Realizing Perry is the real Pericles Llewellyn McWallander, the Old Man reveals he got his hat from Perry's grandson Mickey, and convinces Perry there are people still out there waiting for him. Perry decides to help, but knowing he cannot really return home, he gives the Old Man the hat and instructs him to bring it back to his grandson ("Prison Fish Interlude #3").

After destroying the fish, the Old Man awakens alone on a deserted island. He encounters a dog―which once belonged to Mabelu, a member of the ship's crew. With the dog's help, the Old Man builds a raft that they use to sail away. The water around them dissolves into vapor, until they are left in a desert ("I Crash"). Continuing on but lacking drinking water, the Old Man passes out after drinking the moisture from a psychedelic weed. He and the dog are picked up in a hot air balloon flown by Solomon and Bartley Montgolfier, two scientists studying the change in weather since the moon ran out of light. They encounter the rest of the Old Man's former crew and pick them up, but the added weight causes the balloon to spin out of control. The Old Man leaps out in order to save weight.

He lands in what he realizes is the city of the light, unearthed due to the disappearance of the ocean, and his memories of the past finally come back: he was once a resident of the city, which tapped into a well spring of liquid light. But the residents' use of the light brought on a massive thunderstorm, flooding the city. The Old Man saved a bucket of light but was nearly swept away himself, saved at the last second by a young woman. The two decided to keep it safe by hanging it in the sky from a lantern, which became the moon, and was able to calm the storm. Before they could leave to go exploring, they noticed a leak in the lantern, and so they elected to stay so the Old Man could keep refilling it. The Old Man climbs the cliffs with a bucket of liquid light and refills the moon ("Bremen"). Realizing he has gone so far around the world he has made it back home, he goes to his house to find his wife waiting for him, and the two decide to go exploring as they pledged to years ago. Before they leave, the Old Man reunites with Llewellyn, who reveals the entire crew made it home safely as well. The Old Man convinces Llewellyn to take up his old duty of refilling the moon, but assures him it is alright for the moon to not always be full. He also gives Llewellyn the hat, telling him to return it to Mickey, before boarding a boat with the Old Woman and sailing off to parts unknown.

== Musical numbers ==
- "Song from the Stone" — Singer and Company
- "The Rain Will Fall" — Company
- "The Sailor’s Anthem" — Sailors
- "The Rain Will Fall (Reprise)" - Company
- "Sail for Love" — Captain and Sailors
- "Sail for Love (Reprise) — Sailors
- "Just Like the Sea" — Old Man and Company
- "Prison Fish Interlude #1" — Ghost Singer
- "Prison Fish Interlude #2" — Ghost Singer
- "Prison Fish Interlude #3" — Ghost Singer and Company
- "I Crash" — Singer, Matheson, and Company
- "Bremen" — Old Man and Company

== Critical response ==
=== 2012 Off-Broadway premiere ===
Ken Jarowski at The New York Times writes about how the play inspires "giddy feelings" and cannot be summed up into words.

Scott Brown, the theatre critic at Vulture, wrote:

The Old Man is an all-ages journey into the frontiers of undiluted imagination, where tweeness isn’t transcended so much as spun into gold. And if the whole doesn’t really go anywhere, well, that’s entirely beside the point. It’s how you get there, after all. That’s what puts this show — and its thrillingly talented creators — on the map.

=== 2014 Revised Production ===
Ben Brantley, the chief theatre critic for The New York Times in 2014, wrote about how the new production, " has since undergone a makeover of sorts, shedding some weight and smoothing some calluses… But it retains the illusion of a willfully unwieldy beast, which is essential to its appeal."
