= Cavalieri Addobbati =

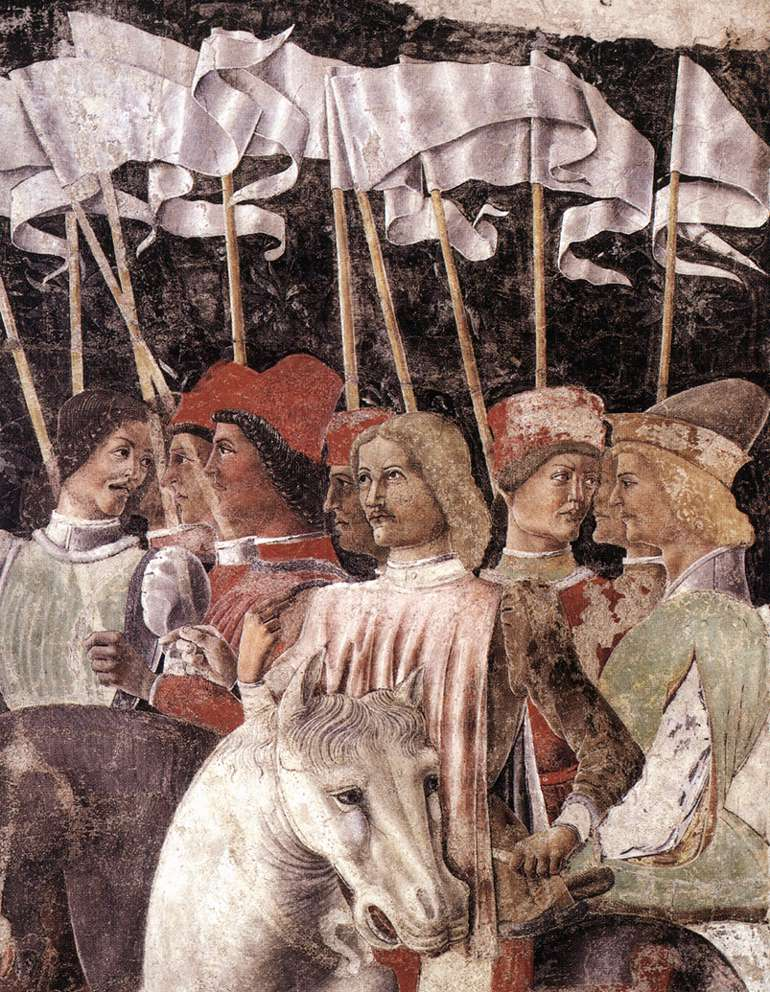
Baldassare Estense - Horseman (detail of fresco in the Palazzo Schifanoia, Ferrara from about 1470

The Cavalieri Addobbati, also known as Cavalieri di Corredo, were the elite among Italian knights in the Middle Ages. The two names are derived from addobbo, the old name for decoration, and corredo, meaning equipment. These were knights who could afford elaborate clothes, armor and equipment for themselves, their charger and their palfrey.

The term "cavaliere", or knight, applied to anyone who fought on horseback, from nobles to peasants. According to Franco Sacchetti (c. 1335 – c. 1400), there were three other types of Italian knight in his day. The cavalieri bagnati, or knights of the bath, were invested with elaborate ceremonies in which they were washed of all impurities. The cavalieri di scudo, or knights of the shield, were men who had been made knights by princes or states. The cavalieri d'arme, or knights of arms, were soldiers who were created knights before or after a battle. These distinctions do not seem to have been particularly rigid. However, the cavalieri addobbati were the elite, roughly corresponding to the nobility.

In Italy in the fourteenth century, the cost of a knight's full equipment would have cost as much as a laborer could earn in several years, and in addition the knight would have to dress their squire and servants. The son of a noble family might gain some rudimentary education in the trivium of grammar, rhetoric and dialectic, and then the quadrivium of arithmetic, music, geometry and astronomy. However, many never learned to read or write. Much more important was learning to ride, to handle the bow, shield, sword and javelin and to fence. By the age of fifteen, the young man would be ready to be knighted in an elaborate ceremony that began in church and ended at the banquet table.

The title of "dominus" was usually reserved for priests and Cavalieri Addobbati. In 1182 we hear that the feudal investiture of Bishop Gaimaro of Ivrea was undertaken in the presence and with the consent of ten vassals, five of whom were cavalieri addobbati from the leading families of Ivria, Vercelli and Canavese.
