= Have a Good Funeral, My Friend... Sartana Will Pay =

1970 film

- Directed by: Giuliano Carnimeo
- Screenplay by: Giovanni Simonelli; Roberto Gianviti
- Story by: Giovanni Simonelli
- Starring: Gianni Garko; António Vilar; Daniela Giordano; Ivano Saccioli
- Cinematography: Stelvio Massi
- Edited by: Giuliana Attenni
- Music by: Bruno Nicolai
- Production companies: Flora Film; Hispamer Films
- Distributed by: Variety Distribution
- Release date: October 1970
- Running time: 92 minutes
- Countries: Italy; Spain

Have a Good Funeral, My Friend... Sartana Will Pay (Italian: Buon funerale amigos!... paga Sartana) is a 1970 Spaghetti Western film directed by Giuliano Carnimeo, written by Roberto Gianviti and starring Gianni Garko as Sartana.

== Plot ==
After witnessing the massacre of Joe Benson and his band of prospectors (and wiping out the killers), Sartana is ready to do some investigating as to why. However, since almost everyone in the town of Indian Creek is eager to buy up the dead man's land, there is a long list of suspects, including the town banker, a female saloon owner and the owner of the local gambling house. Even the local sheriff and the dead prospector's niece who now owns the land cannot be ruled out, and the closer Sartana gets to the truth the more attempts are made on his life and the more funerals he will willingly pay for...as long as HE is the one doing the killing.

== Cast ==
- Gianni Garko as Sartana
- Daniela Giordano as Abigail Benson
- Ivano Staccioli as "Blackie"
- Helga Liné as Saloon Girl Mary
- Luis Induni as The Sheriff
- Franco Ressel as Samuel Piggott
- George Wang as Lee Tse Tung
- Franco Pesce as The Gravedigger
- Rick Boyd as Jim Piggott
- Attilio Dottesio as Joe Benson
- Antonio Vilar as Ronald Hoffman
- Jean-Pierre Clarain as Elmo Piggot
- Roberto Dell'Acqua as Frank Piggot
- Rocco Lerro as Ralph Piggot
- Fortunato Arena as Casino Troublemaker
- Guido Barlocci as Croupier
- Aldo Berti as Joe "Colorado Joe"
- Mario Dardanelli as Tony
- Donato Di Sepio as Barber
- Alberigo Donadeo as Gambling House Guest
- John P. Dulaney as Cowboy
- Oscar Giustini as Hitman
- Mauro Mannatrizio as Bandit
- Romano Milani as Weapon Master At Gambling House
- Fulvio Pellegrino as Bank Employee
- Claudio Ruffini as Casino Bouncer
- Sandro Scarchilli as Bandit
- Sergio Testori as Casino Troublemaker
- Pietro Torrisi as Casino Bouncer
- Clemente Ukmar as Casino Troublemaker

== Release ==
Have a Good Funeral, My Friend...Sartana Will Pay was released in October 1970.
