= Paolo Moffa =

Italian film director

- Born: 16 December 1915; Rome, Italy
- Died: 26 February 2005 (aged 89); Nizza Monferrato, Italy
- Occupations: Film director Film producer Screenwriter
- Years active: 1943–1982

Paolo Moffa (16 December 1915 – 26 February 2005) was an Italian film director, producer and screenwriter. He directed seven films between 1943 and 1982.

Born in Rome, Moffa started his career in the 1930s as a script supervisor. Mainly active as an executive producer, he was also second unit director for numerous films until 1958. He was the founder of the film company Società Ambrosiana Cinematografica. He was also a film editor and a documentarist.

== Selected filmography ==
- The Last Days of Pompeii (a.k.a. Sins of Pompeii) (1950 - director)
- Husband and Wife (1952, producer)
- The Cheerful Squadron (1954 - director)
- The Island Princess (1954 - director)
- Hercules, Prisoner of Evil (1964 - producer)
- Johnny Colt (1966 - producer)
- Five for Hell (1969 - producer)
- Sartana the Gravedigger (1969 - producer)
