= Franco Pesce =

Italian actor and cinematographer

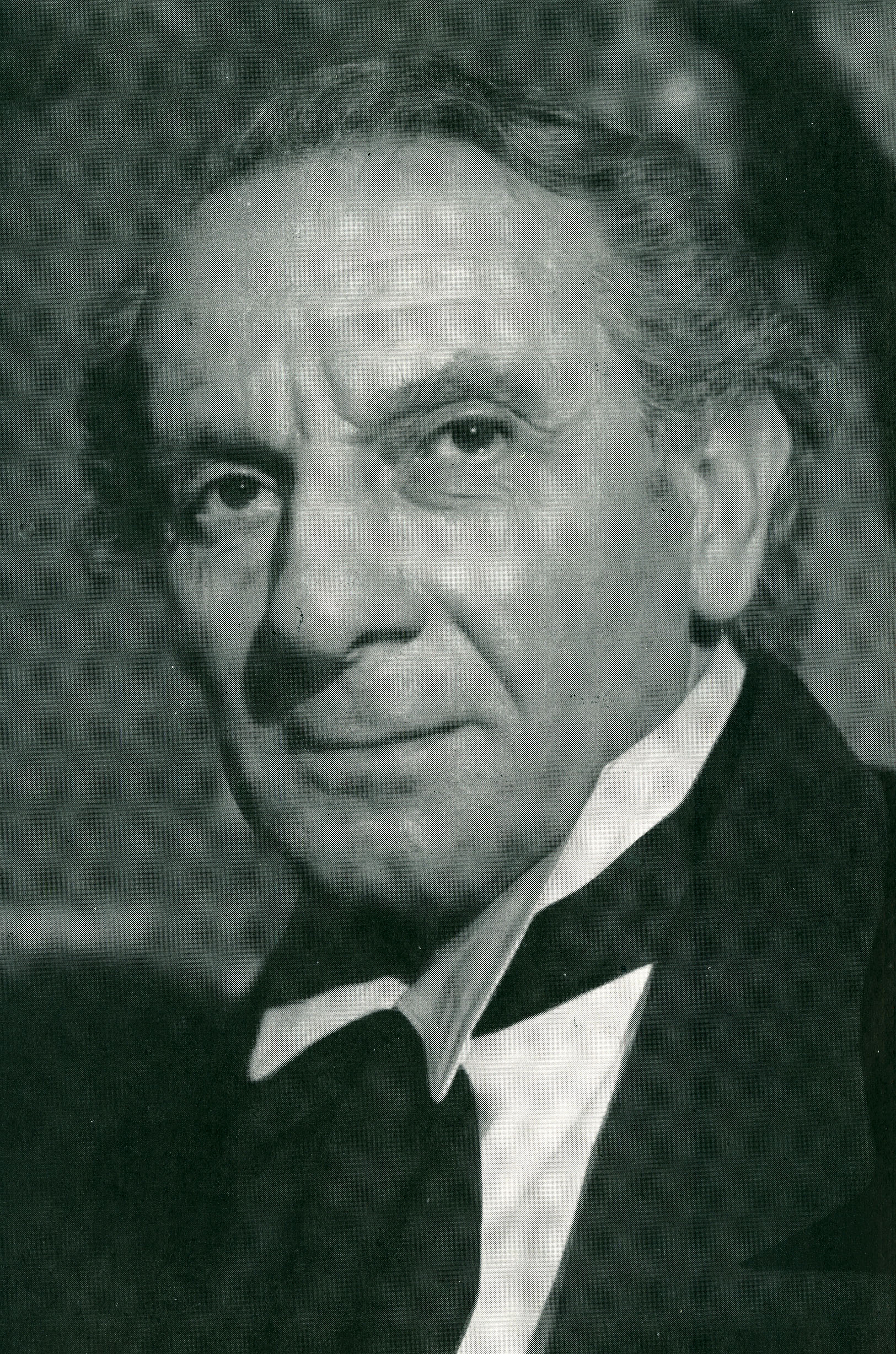
- Born: 11 August 1890; Naples, Kingdom of Italy
- Died: 6 December 1975 (aged 85); Rome, Italy
- Occupation: Actor

Franco Pesce (11 August 1890 – 6 December 1975) was an Italian actor and cinematographer.

== Life and career ==
Franco Pesce was born in Naples. He was the son of the actor Ettore. At a young age Pesce studied lyric singing with the intention of becoming an opera singer. At 20 years old he abandoned his studies to enter the cinema industry as a film operator. Pesce moved to Rome with the advent of sound film where he became a cinematographer. Later in his life, beginning in 1940, he started a very productive career as a character actor. In his later years Pesce was mainly active in spaghetti western films. He was often credited under English pseudonyms, usually interpreting roles of petulant, pedantic and intriguing old men.

== Selected filmography ==
- Eternal Melodies (1940)
- Apparition (1943)
- Farewell, My Beautiful Naples (1946)
- Mad About Opera (1948)
- Baron Carlo Mazza (1948)
- Crossroads of Passion (1948)
- Flying Squadron (1949)
- The Beggar's Daughter (1950)
- The Transporter (1950)
- The Bread Peddler (1950)
- Song of Spring (1951)
- Operation Mitra (1951)
- They Were Three Hundred (1952)
- Prisoners of Darkness (1952)
- Prisoner in the Tower of Fire (1952)
- If You Won a Hundred Million (1953)
- The Lovers of Manon Lescaut (1954)
- The Last Race (1954)
- Revolt of the Mercenaries (1961)
- Long Days of Hate (1968)
- Pistol for a Hundred Coffins (1968)
- Orgasmo (1969)
- Le Mans, Shortcut to Hell (1970)
- Cloud of Dust... Cry of Death... Sartana Is Coming (1970)
- Have a Good Funeral, My Friend... Sartana Will Pay (1970)
- In Love, Every Pleasure Has Its Pain (1971)
- The Last Traitor (1971)
- They Call Me Hallelujah (1971)
- His Name Was Holy Ghost (1972)
- Where the Bullets Fly (1972)
- We Are No Angels (1975)
- The Diamond Peddlers (1976)
