= Vengeance Is Mine (1967 film) =

1967 film

- Directed by: Giovanni Fago
- Screenplay by: Ernesto Gastaldi
- Story by: Sergio Martino
- Produced by: Mino Loy; Luciano Martino
- Starring: Gianni Garko; Claudio Camaso; Claudie Lange; Susanna Martinková; Piero Lulli; Fernando Sancho
- Cinematography: Federico Zanni
- Edited by: Eugenio Alabiso
- Music by: Nora Orlandi
- Production companies: Flora Film; Zenith Cinematografica
- Distributed by: Variety Distribution
- Release date: 30 November 1967
- Running time: 92 minutes
- Country: Italy
- Language: Italian

Vengeance Is Mine (Italian: Per 100.000 dollari ti ammazzo, lit. 'I'll kill you for 100,000 dollars'), also known as $100000 for a Killing and For $100,000 per Killing, is a 1967 Italian Spaghetti Western film. It represents the directorial debut film of Giovanni Fago (here credited as Sidney Lean). On the set of this film Gianni Garko got to know Susanna Martinková, a Czechoslovak actress at her debut in an Italian production, who little later married the actor and had a daughter with him.

== Plot ==
Bounty hunter John delivers four wanted criminals, all of them dead. When he checks out the new posters at the sheriff's office he recognizes his half-brother Clint on one of them. John could never forget how Clint killed their mutual father out of jealousy; Clint later blamed the misdeed on John who wrongly spent 10 years in prison. Now Clint is good for 6,000 dollars. John has no reservations about going after him because it was Clint who rendered John an outcast with no other chance left to make a living other than by becoming a bounty hunter. When John eventually gets to him, Clint is just fighting with his gang about a stash of 100,000 dollars.

== Cast ==
- Gianni Garko (credited as Gary Hudson) as Johnny Forest
- Claudio Camaso as Clint Forest
- Piero Lulli as Jurago
- Fernando Sancho as Concalves
- Claudie Lange as Anne
- Bruno Corazzari as Gary
- Susanna Martinková as Mary
- Andrea Scotti as Jim
- Silvio Bagolini as The Sheriff
- Jole Fierro as John & Clint's Mother
- Dada Gallotti as The Saloon Singer
- Adriana Giuffrè
