= Light the Fuse... Sartana Is Coming =

1970 film

- Directed by: Giuliano Carnimeo
- Screenplay by: Eduardo Maria Brochero; Tito Carpi; Ernesto Gastaldi
- Story by: Eduardo Maria Brochero
- Starring: Gianni Garko; Nieves Navarro; Massimo Serato; Bruno Corazzari
- Cinematography: Julio Ortas
- Edited by: Ornella Micheli
- Music by: Bruno Nicolai
- Production companies: Devon Film; Copercines
- Distributed by: Titanus
- Release date: 24 December 1970
- Running time: 99 minutes
- Countries: Italy; Spain
- Language: Italian

Light the Fuse... Sartana Is Coming (Italian: Una nuvola di polvere... un grido di morte... arriva Sartana, lit. "Cloud of dust... cry of death... Sartana is coming", Spanish: Llega Sartana, also known as Gunman in Town and Run, Man, Run... Sartana's in Town) is a 1970 Italian-Spanish Spaghetti Western film directed by Giuliano Carnimeo and starring Gianni Garko as Sartana.

== Plot ==
After killing a corrupt sheriff and his deputies in the town of Sandy Creek, Sartana surrenders himself to Everglades Penitentiary under the guise of a convict with the purpose of meeting Granville, a man imprisoned there. Sartana helps Granville escape from prison. Granville claims to have been double-crossed by his casino business partner, Horace Johnson, in a deal with the outlaw Monk and Joe, the younger brother of corrupt sheriff Manassas Jim. The deal was for Monk to obtain two million dollars in counterfeit money from Joe in exchange for half a million dollars in gold. Johnson's role, as a banker, was to legalize the transaction, but he killed both Monk's representative and Joe instead and framed Granville for it. Johnson was later found dead in the casino while the counterfeit money and the gold disappeared, thus leaving Granville as the prime suspect who was captured and imprisoned by Manassas Jim.

The loot is hidden somewhere in the town of Mansfield. Granville convinces Sartana to help locate the gold, with the intention of splitting it with him. Sartana goes to Mansfield alone and learns that there are more people after the gold with different versions of how the murders in the casino took place. Manassas Jim's story is identical to that of Granville's, while Monk insists he witnessed only two corpses in the gambling house and insinuates that the sheriff killed Johnson, and placed his body nearby the other two. Sartana also meets Belle, the supposed widow of Johnson, who says her late husband used her money in dirty deals, claiming ownership of the legitimate currency in return. Sartana informs each of them individually that he plans to split the gold with them, without the others knowing about it, and sends them to Sonora where Granville is hiding, with the purpose of manipulating them against one another. His plan succeeds and Granville makes it out alive during the shootout.

Plonplon, an elderly man whom Sartana befriended in Mansfield, is found murdered in a stable after deducing where the gold is hidden. As Sartana arrives to find the body, the killer makes an unsuccessful attempt on his life, but flees the scene before getting discovered. Searching for clues, Sartana pays Belle a visit and finds Johnson's boots covered in crystalline dirt. Sartana later digs up Joe's grave and examine his boots, which confirms his suspicion regarding the location of the counterfeit money. Sartana comes across Sam Puttnam, an undercover federal agent who also is after the gold, believing it is a property of the U.S. government. Puttnam examines the crystalline dirt on the boots and tells Sartana to rendezvous with him at the town's Turkish bath. Before making it to the meeting place, Sartana finds Puttnam murdered, with his last uttered word being "Apache". Manassas Jim's men ambush Sartana at the Turkish bath, but he manages to kill them all and flees to the nearest Apache cave.

Sartana confronts Manassas Jim there, kills him and burns the counterfeit money. Sartana travels back to Mansfield to strike a deal with Belle whom he tells that he has found out where the gold is. Belle, however, secretly informs Monk in hopes of splitting the gold with him if he kills Sartana. Sartana, knowing that Belle would betray him to what she thought would be the stronger side, awaits the arrival of Monk and his gang in Mansfield. A gunfight ensues and Sartana comes out on top. Granville and Belle, who were having an affair behind Johnson's back, were the orchestrators of the entire scheme. Belle, Plonplon's killer, secretly attempts to kill Granville, who shoots her first, having seen through her double-cross. Arriving at the casino, Sartana deduces Granville's scheme: Johnson had never betrayed him but was played for a fool by Granville, who later killed him after hiding the loot in separate locations, with the gold being at the gambling house. Left with no cards to play, Granville faces Sartana in a standoff and dies. Sartana takes the half-million dollars in gold and departs Mansfield.

== Cast ==
- John Garko as Sartana
- Nieves Navarro as Sra. Belle Manassas
- Massimo Serato as Sheriff Manassas Jim
- Piero Lulli as Granville
- José Jaspe as General Monk
- Frank Braña as Sam Puttman
- Bruno Corazzari as Heinz
- Franco Pesce as Plonplon
- Luis Induni as Sheriff in Sandy Creek
- Renato Baldini as Nobody
- Salvatore Borgese as The Traitor
- Giuseppe Castellano as Director of Penitentiary
- Lino Coletta as Sancho, Guard
- Raffaele Di Mario as Gus, Guard
- Fernando Bilbao as Monk's Henchman
- Beatrice Pellegrino
- Brizio Montinaro as Killer In Turkish Bath
- Gianni Pulone
- María Vico
- Francisco Sanz as Judge In Sandy Creek
- Antonio Peral
- Alfonso de la Vega as Monk's Henchman
- Francesco Anniballi as Man In Saloon
- Nestore Cavaricci as Prison Warden
- Alfonso Giganti as Killer In Sauna
- Mara Krupp as Hotel Owner
- Gennarino Pappagalli as Johnson
- Fulvio Pellegrino as Prisoner
- Aysanoa Runachagua as Moko Henchman
- Amerigo Santarelli as Townsman
- Romano Targa as Poker Player
- Dan van Husen as Deputy Sheriff In Sandy Creek

== Release ==
Light the Fuse... Sartana Is Coming was released on 24 December 1970.

== Reception ==
In a contemporary review, Verina Glaessner (Monthly Film Bulletin) reviewed an 89 minute English-dubbed version of the film titled Gunman in Town. Glaessner found the film to be "a thickly and incomprehensibly plotted Western" with "various devices resurrected from the Dollar films help to make it reasonably watchable".
