= Sartana's Here... Trade Your Pistol for a Coffin =

1970 film

Sartana's Here… Trade Your Pistol for a Coffin
- Directed by: Giuliano Carnimeo
- Screenplay by: Tito Carpi
- Story by: Tito Carpi
- Starring: George Hilton; Charles Southwood; Erika Blanc
- Cinematography: Stelvio Massi
- Edited by: Ornella Micheli
- Music by: Francesco De Masi
- Production company: Colt Produzioni Cinematografiche
- Distributed by: Panta Cinematografica
- Release date: August 7, 1970 (Italy)
- Running time: 90 minutes
- Countries: Italy; Spain

Sartana's Here... Trade Your Pistol for a Coffin (Italian: C'è Sartana... vendi la pistola e comprati la bara, "There is Sartana… Sell the Pistol and Buy a Coffin") AKA A Fistful of Lead is a 1970 Spaghetti Western that is the third of the Sartana film series with George Hilton taking over the lead role from Gianni Garko. The film was shot in Italy and directed by Giuliano Carnimeo.

== Plot ==
Bounty hunter Sartana is eagerly awaiting to kill or capture a wanted man who is riding shotgun on a shipment of gold. Interrupting Sartana's picnic and bounty hunting, a gang of Mexican Bandidos kill all the outriders, but leave the gold intact and ride away but not before throwing dynamite into the wagon. Sartana prevents the explosion and discovers the gold sacks in the wagon are full of sand.

Disguised as a Mexican peon, Sartana tracks the Mexicans to their lair and kills several of them before going to the town of Appaloosa where he discovers that the Bandidos were paid by Spencer, the owner of the mine to commit a fake robbery so Spencer can keep the majority of gold for himself. Sartana pits the surviving Mexicans against Spencer, but also faces greedy but impoverished saloon owner Trixie and rival bounty hunter Sabbath, both of whom have their eyes on the gold.

== Cast ==
- George Hilton as Sartana
- Charles Southwood as Sabbath
- Erika Blanc as Trixie
- Piero Lulli as Samuel Spencer
- Nello Pazzafini as Mantas
- Carlo Gaddi as Baxter
- Aldo Barberito as Angelo
- Linda Sini as Mantas' Wife
- Marco Zuanelli as "Dead Eye" Golfay
- Luciano Rossi as Flint Fossit
- Fortunato Arena as Old Man
- John Bartha as Sheriff
- Federico Boido as Joe Fossit
- Luigi Bonos as Posada Owner
- Armando Calvo as Hoagy
- Spartaco Conversi as Emiliano
- Furio Meniconi as Romero

== Release ==
Sartana's Here… Trade Your Pistol for a Coffin was released in Italy in August 1970.
