= I am Sartana, Your Angel of Death =

1969 film

- Film poster
- Directed by: Giuliano Carnimeo
- Screenplay by: Tito Carpi; Enzo Dell'Aquila
- Story by: Tito Carpi
- Produced by: Aldo Addobbati; Paolo Moffa
- Starring: Gianni Garko; Frank Wolff; Ettore Manni; Salvatore Borgese
- Cinematography: Giovanni Bergamini
- Edited by: Ornella Micheli
- Music by: Vasco Vassil Kojucharov; Elsio Mancuso
- Production company: Società Ambrosiana Cinematografica
- Distributed by: Indipendenti Regionali
- Release date: November 1969
- Country: Italy

I am Sartana, Your Angel of Death (Italian: Sono Sartana, il vostro becchino) is a 1969 Italian Western film directed by Giuliano Carnimeo and starring Gianni Garko as Sartana. The film is presented on some DVD reissues under its German title, Sartana - Töten war sein täglich Brot.

== Plot ==
A man disguised as Sartana leads a gang in robbing a bank of $300,000. While the real Sartana tries to prove his innocence and find the imposter, he is constantly pursued by bounty hunters: some who only care about the $10,000 reward on his head, a few who are more interested in locating the stolen money and one who mixes bad luck at gambling with good luck in bounty-hunting.

== Cast ==
- Gianni Garko as Sartana
- Frank Wolff as Buddy Ben
- Klaus Kinski as Hot Dead
- Gordon Mitchell as Deguejo
- Ettore Manni as Baxter Red
- Sal Borgese as Fetente
- Renato Baldini as The Judge
- Federico Boido as Bill

== Production ==
Carnimeo stated that Gianni Garko who plays Sartana came up with many of the illusions and tricks that Sartana would perform in the film. Unlike Gianfranco Parolini, the director of If You Meet Sartana Pray for Your Death, Carnimeo stated he did not have any issues shooting the film with Klaus Kinski. Carnimeo said that Kinski arrived on set, proceeded to costumes and make-up and then on set and that Kinski was "meticulous and precise like a Swiss watch."

== Release ==
I am Sartana, Your Angel of Death was released in November 1969.

== See also ==
- Klaus Kinski filmography
- List of Italian films of 1969
