= Gianni Garko =

Italian actor (born 1935)

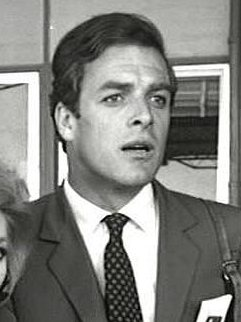
- Garko in Don Camillo in Moscow (1965)
- Born: Giovanni Garcovich; 15 July 1935 (age 91); Zara, Kingdom of Italy (present-day Zadar, Croatia)
- Other names: John Garko; Gary Hudson
- Education: Accademia Nazionale di Arte Drammatica Silvio D'Amico
- Occupation: Actor
- Years active: 1959–present
- Spouse: Susanna Martinková (m. 1973; div. 1986)

Gianni Garko (born Giovanni Garcovich; 15 July 1935) is a Croatian-Italian actor. He found fame as a leading man in 1960s Spaghetti Westerns, where he was often billed as John Garko and occasionally Gary Hudson. He is perhaps best known for his lead role as Sartana, starting with the first official film If You Meet Sartana Pray for Your Death and starring in three sequels as this character.

== Early life and education ==
Of Dalmatian Italian and Croatian parentage, Garko was born Giovanni Garcovich in Zara (now Zadar, Croatia), at the time a part of Fascist Italy. In 1948, he moved to Trieste, and later to Rome, the Accademia Nazionale di Arte Drammatica Silvio D'Amico.

== Career ==
=== Early roles ===
His first prominent film role was a small but important part in the Academy Award-nominated Holocaust drama Kapò (1959), directed by Gillo Pontecorvo. He continued to play parts in several Italian productions, including sword and sandal epics such as The Mongols (1961) and Mole Men Against the Son of Hercules (1961).

In 1964, he starred in the stage comedy Le baruffe chiozzotte at the Teatro Lirico in Milan, directed by Giorgio Strehler.

His big break came when he had a role in Don Camillo in Moscow (1965).

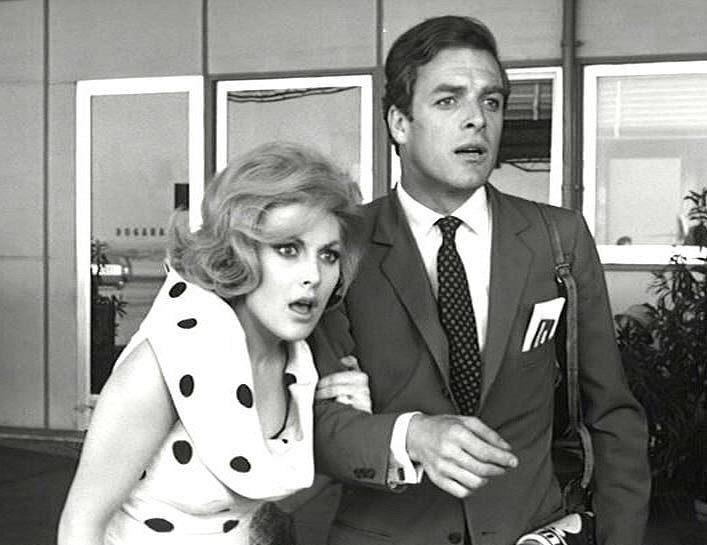
Graziella Granata and Gianni Garko in Don Camillo in Moscow (1965)

=== Spaghetti Western era and Sartana ===
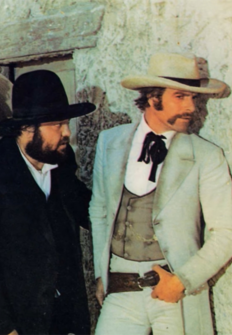
Gianni Garko and Cris Huerta in Uomo avvisato mezzo ammazzato... parola di Spirito Santo (1972)

Garko became a star in Europe in the 1966 Spaghetti Western film Blood at Sundown. In this movie, he played an antagonist named El General Sartana. In 1968, he played an unrelated protagonist also named Sartana in If You Meet Sartana Pray for Your Death (Italian: Se incontri Sartana prega per la tua morte). The movie was an immediate box office success, and led to four official follow-up Sartana films, with Garko starring in the first three of them: I Am Sartana Your Angel of Death (Sono Sartana, il vostro becchino, 1969), Have a Good Funeral, My Friend... Sartana Will Pay (Buon funerale, amigos!... paga Sartana, 1970), and Light the Fuse... Sartana Is Coming (Una nuvola di polvere... un grido di morte... arriva Sartana, 1970). (George Hilton starred in the fourth, Sartana's Here… Trade Your Pistol for a Coffin (C'è Sartana... vendi la pistola e comprati la bara, 1970.)

Other notable westerns Garko starred in were $10,000 Blood Money (1967) as an unofficial Django, Vengeance Is Mine (1967), 10,000 Dollars for a Massacre (1967), The Price of Death (1971), They Call Him Cemetery (1971) alongside William Berger as well as a supporting role in Bad Man's River (1971) with Lee Van Cleef. During this time he achieved considerable fame in Germany, Italy, and Spain. Outside of the western genre, Garko starred in Five for Hell (1969) with frequent co-star Klaus Kinski, a small role in Waterloo (1970) as the brave and energetic French artillery commander Antoine Drouot, and The Heroes (1973), both with Rod Steiger.

=== Post-Spaghetti Westerns ===
Like many of his contemporaries, his star diminished as the Spaghetti Western genre began to decline. He was still able to get roles in several successful gialli and horror movies, sex comedies, and Poliziotteschi movies. Among these are Cold Eyes of Fear (1971), The Night of the Devils (1972), Il Boss (1973), The Flower with the Petals of Steel (1973), Sette note in nero (1977 with Jennifer O'Neill), Joy of Flying (1977), Graf Dracula in Oberbayern (1979, a Bavarian sex comedy), Star Odyssey (1979), Encounters in the Deep (1979), Hercules (1983 with Lou Ferrigno), and Monster Shark (1984).

In 1980, he starred in the play Candida at the Teatro Morlacchi in Perugia.

After appearing in Space: 1999 (1975) as Tony Cellini in the episode "Dragon's Domain", Garko concentrated more on television, theatre, and TV commercials. Although established in Europe, he remained little known in America. In an interview, Garko mentioned that he had turned down the lead role in Pretty Baby (1978) with Brooke Shields.

Garko continued to appear regularly on Italian television well into the new millennium. He played Tancredi Lombardi in 52 episodes of the 2016-2017 teen sitcom Maggie & Bianca: Fashion Friends.

In 2018, he played Father Merrin in the play version of The Exorcist, at the Teatro Nuovo in Milan. In 2022 he received the Almeria Western Film Festival Award.

== Selected filmography ==
- Un soir sur la plage (1961)
- The Mongols (1961)
- Mole Men Against the Son of Hercules (1961)
- Pontius Pilate (1962)
- Crazy Desire (1962)
- Eighteen in the Sun (1962)
- The Avenger (1962)
- Saul and David (1964)
- Don Camillo in Moscow (1965)
- $1,000 on the Black (1966)
- Vengeance Is Mine (1967)
- 10,000 Dollars for a Massacre (1967)
- Giorni di sangue (1968)
- Code Name: Red Roses (1968)
- Taste of Vengeance (1968)
- If You Meet Sartana Pray for Your Death (1968)
- Lucrezia (1968)
- Five for Hell (1969)
- Thunder from the West (1969)
- Sartana the Gravedigger (1969)
- Tulips of Haarlem (1970)
- The Cop (1970)
- Sartana Kills Them All (1970)
- Have a Good Funeral, My Friend... Sartana Will Pay (1970)
- Waterloo (1970)
- Light the Fuse... Sartana Is Coming (1970)
- The Price of Death (1971)
- A Bullet for a Stranger (They Call Him Cemetery) (1971)
- Bad Man's River (1971)
- His Name Was Holy Ghost (1972)
- Night of the Devils (1972)
- The Boss (1973)
- Gli eroi (The Heroes) (1973)
- Those Dirty Dogs (1973)
- The Flower with the Deadly Sting (1973)
- Siete chacales (1974)
- Marco Visconti (1975, TV series)
- The Psychic (1977)
- Joy of Flying (1977)
- Three Swedes in Upper Bavaria (1977)
- Dracula Blows His Cool (1979)
- The New Godfathers (1979)
- Encounters in the Deep (1979)
- Star Odyssey (1979)
- Monster Shark (1984)
- The Betrothed (1989)
- In the Name of the Sovereign People (1990)
- Heads or Tails? (2025)

== In popular culture ==
Garko's name inspired that of the title character in the 2001 film Donnie Darko.
