= Ten Thousand Dollars for a Massacre =

1967 film

- Italian film poster
- Directed by: Romolo Guerrieri
- Screenplay by: Franco Fogagnolo; Ernesto Gastaldi; Luciano Martino; Sauro Scavolini
- Story by: Franco Fogagnolo; Ernesto Gastaldi; Luciano Martino
- Produced by: Mino Loy; Luciano Martino
- Starring: Gary Hudson; Loredana Nusciak; Claudio Camaso; Fernando Sancho
- Cinematography: Federico Zanni
- Edited by: Sergio Montanari
- Music by: Nora Orlandi
- Production companies: Zenith Cinematografica; Flora Film
- Distributed by: Variety Distribution
- Release date: 3 March 1967
- Country: Italy
- Language: Italian

10.000 dollari per un massacro (internationally released as $10.000 Blood Money and Guns of Violence) is a 1967 Italian spaghetti Western film directed by Romolo Guerrieri.

The film was one of the unofficial sequels of Django, and had the working title 7 dollari su Django ("7 Dollars on Django").

It was shown as part of a retrospective on Spaghetti Western at the 64th Venice International Film Festival.

== Plot ==
Local crime boss Manuel kidnaps Dolores, the daughter of rich rancher Mendoza. Her father hires Django to free her.

== Cast ==
- Gary Hudson as Django
- Loredana Nusciak as Mijanou
- Claudio Camaso as Manuel Vasquez
- Fidel Gonzáles as Fidelio, the Photographer
- Fernando Sancho as Stardust Vásquez
- Adriana Ambesi as Dolores Mendoza
- Pinuccio Ardia as Seven Dollars
- Franco Lantieri as Juan, Vasquez Henchman
- Max Pailey as Cisco
- Mary Fleece as Rosita LaPola
- Dada Galore as Scarface's Woman
- Frank Little as Mendoza
- Aldo Cecconi as "Scarface"
- Renato Montalbano as Cardsharper At Poker
- Peggy Nathan as Ms. Gardner, the Shopkeeper
- Nando Poggi as Miguel, Vasquez Henchman
- Mirko Valentin as Vasquez Henchman
- Elio Angelucci as Bar Patron
- Ettore Arena as Mexican
- Alberigo Donadeo as Mendoza's Foreman
- Jimmy il Fenomeno as The Bartender
- Paolo Figlia as Bounty Hunter
- Rocco Lerro as Deputy Joe
- Herman Reynoso as Mendoza
- Umberto Salomone as Saloon Greeter
