= Giuliano Carnimeo =

Italian film director and screenwriter (1932–2016)

- Born: Giuliano Carmineo; 4 July 1932; Bari, Italy
- Died: 10 September 2016 (aged 84); Rome, Italy
- Other name: Anthony Ascott
- Occupations: Film director, screenwriter

Giuliano Carnimeo (born Carmineo; 4 July 1932 – 10 September 2016) was an Italian director and screenwriter, sometimes credited as Anthony Ascott or Antony Ascot.

== Life and career ==
Born in Bari, Carmineo started his career as assistant director for, among others, Giorgio Simonelli and Camillo Mastrocinque. He made his directorial debut as co-director, alongside George Sherman, of the international co-production Panic Button, later focused on genre films, especially Spaghetti Westerns and commedie sexy all'italiana. He died in Rome on 10 September 2016.

== Selected filmography ==
- 1968 – The Moment to Kill
- 1968 – Find a Place to Die
- 1969 – I am Sartana, Your Angel of Death
- 1970 – Sartana's Here... Trade Your Pistol for a Coffin
- 1970 – Have a Good Funeral, My Friend... Sartana Will Pay
- 1970 – Light the Fuse... Sartana Is Coming
- 1971 – They Call Me Hallelujah
- 1971 – The Case of the Bloody Iris
- 1971 – They Call Him Cemetery
- 1972 – His Name Was Holy Ghost
- 1972 – Return of Halleluja
- 1973 – Holy God, Here Comes the Passatore!
- 1973 – Man Named Invincible
- 1973 – Anna, quel particolare piacere
- 1974 – Poker in Bed
- 1975 – Convoy Buddies
- 1976 – Carioca tigre
- 1976 – The Diamond Peddlers
- 1978 – L'insegnante balla... con tutta la classe
- 1981 – Pierino medico della Saub
- 1981 – I carabbimatti
- 1981 – Mia moglie torna a scuola
- 1983 – Zero in condotta
- 1983 – Exterminators of the Year 3000
- 1988 – Ratman
