= Return of Sabata =

1971 film by Gianfranco Parolini

- Italian film poster
- Directed by: Gianfranco Parolini
- Screenplay by: Renato Izzo; Gianfranco Parolini
- Produced by: Alberto Grimaldi
- Starring: Lee Van Cleef; Reiner Schöne; Giampiero Albertini; Ignazio Spalla; Annabella Incontrera; Jacqueline Alexandre; Aldo Canti; Vassili Karis; Gianni Rizzo
- Cinematography: Sandro Mancori
- Edited by: Gianfranco Parolini
- Music by: Marcello Giombini
- Production companies: Produzioni Europee Associati; Les Productions Artistes Associés; Artemis Filmgesellschaft
- Distributed by: United Artists
- Release date: September 3, 1971 (Italy)
- Running time: 107 minutes
- Countries: Italy; France; West Germany

Return of Sabata (Italian: È tornato Sabata ... hai chiuso un'altra volta, lit. 'Sabata is back ... you're finished again') is a 1971 spaghetti Western film directed by Gianfranco Parolini. The third film in The Sabata Trilogy, it features the return of Lee Van Cleef as the title character, which he had played in the first film, Sabata, but was replaced by Yul Brynner in the second film, Adiós, Sabata, due to a scheduling conflict. Return of Sabata was listed in the 1978 book The Fifty Worst Films of All Time.

== Plot ==
Sabata, a former Confederate army officer and steely-eyed, quick-drawing, impossibly accurate gunman with a trick gun, is working for a travelling circus as a stunt marksman. The circus comes to a small Texas town, where a former subordinate officer, a lieutenant from the army, is running a crooked casino. The man owes Sabata $5,000 from some time ago. Then the circus manager runs off with the circus funds, so Sabata decides to stay in town and try to collect on the debt from his friend. Sabata then runs into conflict with the town's land baron, McIntock, who imposes high taxes on gambling, drinking and prostitution with the supposed idea of building the town up, using the money. Sabata, who is after the money himself, finds out that the townspeople's money in McIntock's safe is counterfeit and that he and the priest have hidden it elsewhere, in the form of gold coins. After a few attempts on his life and many badmen dying under his guns, Sabata and the lieutenant are apparently killed so McIntock goes for the money, only to find them both still alive. Sabata is helped throughout by his friends: the acrobat, his partner and a fat, pompous man who is anything but what he seems.

== Cast ==
- Lee Van Cleef as Sabata
- Reiner Schöne as Clyde
- Giampiero Albertini as Joe McIntock
- Ignazio Spalla as Bronco
- Annabella Incontrera as Maggie
- Jacqueline Alexandre as Jackie McIntock
- Vassili Karis as Bionda, the acrobat
- Aldo Canti (credited as Nick Jordan) as Angel, the acrobat
- Gianni Rizzo as Jeremy Sweeney
- Steffen Zacharias as Donovan
- Pia Giancaro as Diane
- John Bartha as Sheriff
- Günther Stoll as Circus Showman
- Carmelo Reale as Chuck
- Franco Fantasia as Circus Owner

== Release ==
Return of Sabata was released in Italy on 3 September 1971.

== Reception ==
From a retrospective review, Donald Guarisco of AllMovie stated that the film "falls prey to the principle of diminishing returns" noting that it followed the plot of the original Sabata films too closely and that it had "erratic pacing" and was too long.
