= List of Hong Kong films of 1974 =

A list of films produced in Hong Kong in 1974:

== 1974 ==
Title	Director	Cast	Genre	Notes
1974
A Champ Called Killer-Kicker	Man-Hung Mo	Yun Wen Chang	Action	IMDB
The Adventurous Air-Steward	Ho Fan	Lap Ban Chan	Comedy	IMDB
All in Dim Cold Night	Feng Pang	Ping-Yu Chan	Drama	IMDB
The Angry Fist	Tieh Han	Kuan-Hsiung Wang	Action	IMDB
Badge 369	Zhu Mu	Yat Fan Lau	Comedy	IMDB
Bamboo Brotherhood	Kuan Jen Yu	Chiu Chen	Drama	IMDB
The Big Raid	Ou Wei	Feng Chang	Drama	IMDB
The Big Risk	Joseph Kong Hung	Like Cheung	Action	IMDB
The Big Showdown	Wong Tin Lam	Charles Heung	Action, Drama	IMDB
The Black Dragon	Tony Liu, Jun Guk			
Blood Reincarnation	Sin-Sai Din	Nan Chiang	Horror	IMDB
Blood Revenge	Li Su	Phillip Ko	Action	IMDB
Bloody Ring	Teddy Yip Wing Cho	Helen Ma	Action	IMDB
Brand	Yeeong-cheol Choi	Hong-ji Kim	Action	IMDB
Brave Lion	Fei-chien Wu	Barry Chan	Action, War	IMDB
Brother Two	Lung Chien	Feng Chi	Action	IMDB
Bruce Takes Dragon Town	Hung Sheng Liu	Lung Chan, Ping Chou	Action	IMDB
Challenge of the Dragon	Ngai Hoi Fung			
Chase Step By Step				
The Cheeky Little Angels	Sun Chung			
China Behind	Cecille Tong Shu Shuen			IMDB
Chinatown Capers	Lo Wei			
Chinese Boxing	Lee Tso Nam			
Chinese Godfather	Chien Lai	Wai-Man Chan	Action	IMDB
Chinese Iron Man	Joseph Kuo			
Chinese Kung Fu	Artis Chow A Chi			
Chinese Kung Fu Against Godfather	Lee Tso Nam			
Chinese Tiger	Teddy Yip			
The Choice of Love				
Code Name Panther				
Coffee, Wing, Lemonade				
The Colorful Ripples				
Come Rain Or Come Shine	Richard Chen			
The Concrete Jungle	Law Chun			
The Country Bumpkin In Style	Richard Yeung Kuen			
Crazy Acrobat	Yeung Jing Chan			
The Crazy Bumpkins	John Law Ma, Zhang Yang			
The Crazy Instructor (aka Iron Head, Snake Fist Dynamo, The Dragon's Snake Fist)	Law Kei	James Yi Lui, Nancy Liang Lan-Si, Michael Lai Siu-Tin, Lydia Shum Tin-Ha, Lily Chen Ching, Chan Lap-Ban	Martial Arts, Comedy	
Crazy Nuts of Kung Fu	Lee Tso Nam			
The Crazy TV Fans	Wu Fung			
Dae Ha Drama				
Deadly Fists Kung Fu	Joseph Kuo Nam Hung			
Desire				
Desperate Crisis	Yeung Sai Hing			
Dragon Blows	Shut Dik, Wong Tin Lam			
The Drug Addicts	David Chiang			
The Dumb Ox	Wu Ma			
The Dwarf Sorcerer	Chui Hon Cheung			
Dynamite Brothers	Al Adamson			
The Early Spring	Cheung Mei Gwan			
Empress Dowager's Agate Vase	Hau Chiu Sing			
Everyday Is Sunday	Stanley Siu Wing			
Evidence				
The Evil Karate				
The Evil Snake Girl	Chui Chik Lim			
Excelsior	Mo Man Hung			
Farewell Dearest	Patrick Tse Yin			
File of Heroes	Lau Daan Ching			
First Come; First Love				
Fists For Revenge	Cheung Mei Gwan			
Five Shaolin Masters	Chang Cheh	David Chiang	Action	IMDB
Five Tough Guys	Pao Hsueh Lieh			
The Fool and His Money	Dung Ming Saan			
Four Real Friends	Jimmy Wang Yu			
Friends	Chang Cheh			
From the Underworld	Hua Shan			
Fun, Hong Kong Style	Ng Wui	Helena Law Lan, Lee Tim-Sing, Lisa Lui Yau-Wai, Lee Heung-Kam, Sandra Lang	Comedy Drama	
The Furious Monk from Shaolin	Hau Chang			
Games Gamblers Play	Michael Hui	Michael Hui, Samuel Hui, Ricky Hui		IMDB
Ghost Eyes	Kuei Chih Hung			
Ghost In The Mirror	Sung Chuen Sau			
The Ghost Lovers	San Seung Yuk			
The Gigolo	Steve Chan Ho			
Girl Friend	Pai Ching Jui			
The Golden Lotus	Li Han Hsiang			
Gone with the Cloud	Lau Ga Cheong			
Gossip Street	Wong Fung			
Green Green Meadow	The Heinous Fiend			
Hero of Kwantung	Joseph Kuo Nam Hung			
Heroes Two	Chang Cheh			
Hiroshima 28	Patrick Lung Kong			
Hong Kong 73	Chu Yuan			
The Hot Pursuit	Cheung Suk Sang			
House of Love				
Inside The Football Circle				
Iron Ox, The Tigers Killer	Gam Sing-Yan	Wang Kuan Hsiung, Chi Laan, Wong Fei-Lung, Ko Jan-Pang, Ko Gam-Dai, Tsang Chiu, Chang Chi-Ping, Chow Ming-Ching, Ma Cheung, Yau Pang-Sang	Martial arts	
The Iron Profligates	Chan Lit Ban, Mo Man Hung			
Jet-do Karate				
Kidnap	Ching Gong			
The Killer Snakes	Kuei Chih Hung			
Korean Connection				
Korean Connection 2				
Kung Fu on the Bosporus			Action	IMDB
Lady Blood Boxer				
Land of the Brave	Stanley Siu Wing			
Left Foot of Wrath	Lee Doo-yong			
Left Hand of Death				
The Legend of the 7 Golden Vampires	Roy Ward-Baker	Peter Cushing	Action, Horror	IMDB
Little Godfather from Hong Kong	Ng See Yuen			
The Little Man Ah Fook	Cheung Sam			
Long Way from Home	James Yi Lui			
The Looks of Hong Kong	Stanley Fung Shui Fan			
Lovable Mr Able				
Love in Cubicle	Patrick Tse Yin			
Love, Love, Love	Lau Ga Cheong			
Love Needs No Sorrow	Cheung Mei Gwan			
Lucky, Lucky	Paul Chang Chung			
The Mini-Skirt Gang	Lui Kei	Birte Tove, Chen Ping, Nancy Liang Lan-Si, Lee Fung-Lan, Chan Mei-Hua	Adult	
The Prodigal Boxer	Chai Yang-Min	Fei Meng	Action	IMDB
The Rat Catcher	Kuei Chih-Hung	Tien Lie, Lau Luk-Wah	Crime comedy	
The Shrine of Ultimate Bliss	Huang Feng	Angela Mao, George Lazenby, Sammo Hung	Martial arts	
Super Stooges vs. the Wonder Women	Alfonso Brescia	Aldo Canti, Marc Hannibal, Hua Yueh	Comedy	Italian-Hong Kong co-production
Tornado of Pearl River	Wong Sing-Loy	Dorian Tan, Hu Chin, Yuk-Yi Yung	Martial Arts	
