= Sabata =

Sabata may refer to:

== Arts and entertainment ==
- Sabata (film series), a series of Spaghetti Westerns directed by Gianfranco Parolini
  - Sabata (film), the first film in the series
  - Sabata, a gunfighter in the film trilogy
- Sabata, a character in the video game Boktai: The Sun Is in Your Hand

== People ==
- Àngel Sabata (1911–1990), Spanish water polo player
- Jaroslav Šabata (1927–2012), Czech political scientist, psychologist, and dissident
- Victor de Sabata (1892–1967), Italian conductor and composer
- Xavier Sabata (born 1976), Spanish operatic countertenor

== Other ==
- Sabata (city), an ancient city in Sittacene, Ancient Assyria, also spelled Sabdata

== See also ==
- Sabatham, a 1971 Indian film
