= 3 Supermen a Tokyo =

- Directed by: Bitto Albertini
- Screenplay by: Evroni Ebert; Mario Amendola; Bitto Albertini
- Story by: Mario Amendola
- Starring: George Martin; Salvatore Borghese; Willi Colombini
- Cinematography: Umberto Grassia
- Edited by: Vincenzo Vanni
- Music by: Ruggero Cini
- Production companies: Cinesecolo-INDIEF; Terra-Filmkunst
- Release dates: 1968 (Italy); 17 July 1968 (West Germany)
- Running time: 100 minutes
- Countries: Italy; West Germany

3 Supermen a Tokyo (Note: The title is often misspelled as 3 supermen in Tokio, even on the Italian DVD release.) is a 1968 superhero comedy film directed by Bitto Albertini.

== Synopsis ==
Two ruthless thieves known as "the supermen" are captured by the government, and in exchange for commuting their sentence they are forced to accompany the agent Martin, who has a mission to find a recording which, if brought to light, would cause a political scandal. But the road is not easy, and they encounter all kinds of obstacles.

== Production ==
3 Supermen a Tokio did not have any of the original cast outside Gloria Paul of the original film The Three Fantastic Supermen.

3 Supermen a Tokio was shot in Tokyo. When shooting there, director Bitto Albertini stated that filming was shot with indifference from the Japanese passers-by when shooting a car chase with the scene being shot with hidden cameras in hopes to capture the shocked reactions from the crowd.

== Release ==
3 Superman a Tokyo was released in Italy in 1968. It was released in Germany as Drei tolle Kerle on 17 July 1968.

== See also ==
- Supermen Against the Orient
- List of Italian films of 1968
