= Sabata (film series) =

Three films directed by Gianfranco Parolini

- Cover of the 2005 The Sabata Trilogy box set by MGM/UA.
- Original work: Sabata (1969)

Films and television
- Film(s): Sabata (1969); Adiós, Sabata (1970); Return of Sabata (1971)

Sabata is a series of Spaghetti Western films released between 1969 and 1971, directed by Gianfranco Parolini, and starring Lee Van Cleef in the first, Sabata, Yul Brynner in the second, Adiós, Sabata, and Van Cleef returning for the third, Return of Sabata.

== Overview ==
=== Sabata (1969) ===
Lee Van Cleef stars as a lone gunman who foils a plan by some leaders of a small Texas town to rob their own bank and sell the town to the railroad. William Berger co-stars as Banjo, an opposing gunman.

=== Adiós, Sabata (1970) ===
With Yul Brynner cast in the lead role, this film was originally going to be entitled Indio Black, but the title was changed after the first Sabata film proved successful and had inspired many imitators. Lee Van Cleef, star of the first Sabata film, had been offered the role, but had to decline because he was committed to The Magnificent Seven Ride! in the role of Chris Adams, which Brynner had made famous in The Magnificent Seven. Adiós, Sabata is set in Mexico under the rule of Emperor Maximilian I, and Sabata is hired to steal a wagonload of gold from the Austrian army.

=== Return of Sabata (1971) ===
Lee Van Cleef returns to the role of Sabata, who goes to a small Texas town and seeks revenge on a robber baron, determined to steal back some money that the man has stolen from the towns people.

=== Cast and characters ===
List indicator

This section includes characters who will appear or have appeared in the Sabata franchise.

- An empty grey cell indicates the character was not in the film, or that the character's official presence has not yet been confirmed.

| Character | Films | | |
| Character | Sabata | Adiós, Sabata | Return of Sabata |
|---|---|---|---|
| Character | 1969 | 1970 | 1971 |
| Sabata | Lee Van Cleef | Yul Brynner | Lee Van Cleef |
| Indio Black | Nick Jordan | Yul Brynner | Nick Jordan |
| Alley Cat / Angel the Acrobat | Nick Jordan | | Nick Jordan |
| Judge O'Hara / Folgen / Jeremy Sweeney | Gianni Rizzo | Gianni Rizzo | Gianni Rizzo |
| Carrincha / Escudo / Bronco | Ignazio Spalla | Ignazio Spalla | Ignazio Spalla |
| Señor Ocaño / Circus Owner | | Franco Fantasia | Franco Fantasia |

=== Crew ===
| Occupation | Film | | | Ref(s) |
| Occupation | Sabata | Adiós, Sabata | Return of Sabata | Ref(s) |
|---|---|---|---|---|
| Occupation | 1969 | 1970 | 1971 | Ref(s) |
| Director | Gianfranco Parolini (as Frank Kramer) | Gianfranco Parolini (as Frank Kramer) | Gianfranco Parolini (as Frank Kramer) | |
| Producer(s) | Alberto Grimaldi | Alberto Grimaldi | Alberto Grimaldi | |
| Screenwriter(s) | Renato Izzo; Gianfranco Parolini | Renato Izzo; Gianfranco Parolini | Renato Izzo; Gianfranco Parolini | |
| Composer(s) | Marcello Giombini | Bruno Nicolai | Marcello Giombini | |
| Director of photography | Sandro Mancori | Sandro Mancori | Sandro Mancori | |
| Editor | Edmond Lozzi | Gianfranco Parolini | Gianfranco Parolini | |

== DVD release ==
The Sabata Trilogy was released on DVD by MGM/UA in October 2005.

== Other Sabata films ==
As was common with successful Spaghetti Western franchises, such as the Dollars Trilogy, Django or Sartana series, several other Sabata imitators were released. None of these are considered part of the "official" series. They include:

- Wanted Sabata (1970) directed by Roberto Mauri and starring Brad Harris.
- Arriva Sabata! (1970) directed by Tulio Demicheli and starring Peter Lee Lawrence.
- Dig Your Grave Friend... Sabata's Coming (1971) directed by Juan Bosch and starring Raf Baldassarre.
- Watch Out Gringo! Sabata Will Return (1972) directed by Alfonso Balcázar and Pedro Luis Ramírez, and starring George Martin.
