= Super Stooges vs. the Wonder Women =

1974 Italian-Hong Kong film by Alfonso Brescia

- Directed by: Alfonso Brescia
- Starring: Aldo Canti; Marc Hannibal; Hua Yueh; Malisa Longo
- Cinematography: Fausto Rossi
- Edited by: Liliana Serra
- Music by: Franco Micalizzi
- Production companies: A Erre Cinematografica; Shaw Brothers
- Release date: 1974 (Italy)
- Running time: 94 minutes
- Countries: Italy; Hong Kong
- Language: Italian

Super Stooges vs. the Wonder Women (Italian: Superuomini, superdonne, superbotte, lit. 'Supermen, Superwomen, Superpunches') is a 1974 superhero comedy film directed by Alfonso Brescia.

== Cast ==
- Nick Jordan as Aru/Dharma II
- Marc Hannibal as Moog
- Hua Yueh as Chung
- Malisa Longo as Mila
- Aldo Bufi Landi as Dharma I
- Genie Woods as Beghira, Queen of the Amazons
- Riccardo Pizzuti as Philones
- Karen Yeh as May May Wong

== Production ==
Super Stooges vs. the Wonder Women was the second film co-production between Ovidio Assonitis and Giorgio Carlo Rossi's Italian production company A Erre Cinematografica and the Hong Kong Shaw Brothers studio after Supermen Against the Orient. The film was influenced by Terence Young's film The Amazons which Assonitis had previously developed a derivative film of in 1973 titled Battle of the Amazons directed by Alfonso Brescia. Among the cast was Harlem Globetrotter Marc Hannibal and Shaw Brothers actor Hua Yueh.

The films credit the screenwriters as Alfonso Brescia and Aldo Crudo, but Assonitis claims that the script was actually written by Brescia and Bruno Corbucci. The film's story contains elements of the Three Fantastic Supermen Italian film series.

== Release ==
Super Stooges vs. the Wonder Women was released in Italy in 1974. Italian film critic and historian Roberto Curti described the film's box office as performing "modestly" in Italy. The film was picked up for release in the United States by American International Pictures where it often played on a double bill with Madhouse.

The film has been released under a variety of titles in English. These include Barbarian Revenge, Return of the Barbarian Women, Amazons and Supermen, Amazons Against Superman and has been released on DVD in the United States as Amazons vs. Supermen by the Rarescope label.

== Reception ==
TV Guide gave the film one star out of five, stating that after watching this film, you would "beg for The Three Stooges Meet Hercules, who conk each other on the noggin a heck of a lot better than these pseudo-stooges."

== See also ==
- List of Hong Kong films of 1974
- List of Italian films of 1974
