= Face to Face (1967 film) =

1967 film by Sergio Sollima

- Italian film poster by Morini
- Directed by: Sergio Sollima
- Screenplay by: Sergio Donati; Sergio Sollima
- Story by: Sergio Sollima
- Produced by: Alberto Grimaldi
- Starring: Gian Maria Volonté; Tomas Milian; William Berger; Jolanda Modio; Carole André; Gianni Rizzo; Aldo Sanbrell; Lidya Alfonsi
- Cinematography: Rafael Pacheco
- Edited by: Eugenio Alabiso
- Music by: Ennio Morricone
- Production companies: Produzioni Europee Associati (PEA); Arturo González Producciones Cinematográficas
- Distributed by: PEA (Italy)
- Release date: November 1967
- Running time: 112 minutes; 93 minutes (English version)
- Countries: Italy; Spain
- Box office: 1.117 billion ITL (Italy)

Face to Face (Italian: Faccia a faccia; Spanish: Cara a cara German: Halleluja, der Teufel lässt Euch grüßen) is a 1967 Italian/Spanish international co-production Spaghetti Western film co-written and directed by Sergio Sollima and produced by Alberto Grimaldi. The film stars Gian Maria Volonté, Tomas Milian and William Berger, and features a musical score by Ennio Morricone. It is the second of Sollima's three Westerns, following The Big Gundown and predating Run, Man, Run, a sequel to the former. Milian stars in a lead role in all three films.

The film portrays the unlikely partnership of Professor Fletcher (Volonté), a university lecturer, and "Beauregard" Bennet (Milian), a wanted outlaw, and a series of events that results in an exchange of their moral values, culminating in Fletcher taking control of Bennet's bandit gang. Frequently interpreted as a parable based on the rise of European fascism, the story and themes of Face to Face were based on Sollima's wartime experiences, and his personal beliefs on the role of environments and societies in the shaping of a person's character.

A major success at the European box office, Face to Face has received praise from critics and scholars of the Spaghetti Western genre for its story and acting, although some criticism has been leveled at the execution of Fletcher's character arc. Sollima considered it to be one of the best and most personal of the films he directed.

== Plot ==
Sometime after the American Civil War, Brad Fletcher retires from his position as History Professor at Boston University due to tuberculosis and retreats to Texas. The sexually repressed Fletcher is a well-meaning, albeit conceited, liberal who opposes violence and human suffering. While taking a siesta, a stagecoach carrying several lawmen and Solomon "Beauregard" Bennet, a captured criminal, stops by Fletcher's hotel. When Fletcher tries to give Bennet a drink of water, he is taken hostage, and they escape on the stagecoach before becoming lost in the desert. Under Bennet's instructions, Fletcher takes him to a hideout in the forest, where Bennet recovers from his wounds. During this time, Fletcher learns from Bennet how to fire a revolver.

Charley Siringo, a mysterious outlaw, encounters Fletcher and Bennet, convincing the latter to reform his gang, "Bennet's Raiders". Bennet agrees, and he convinces Fletcher to return to Boston. While staying in a hotel in Purgatory City, awaiting an Eastbound train, Fletcher finds Bennet again, who has been hired by businessman Williams to dispatch Sam Taylor's gun-fighting gang; in exchange, Aaron Chase, a Raider, will be freed from prison. A gunfight between Bennet and the gunmen ensues, and Fletcher saves Bennet's life by killing one of them. Later, as Fletcher prepares to board his train, he decides to follow Bennet and Aaron; they are soon joined by fellow Raiders Vance and Jason.

Bennet and Fletcher ride to the de Winton Plantation to visit and recruit another Raider, the Southern gentleman Maximillian de Winton. Siringo returns and proves his loyalty by killing a sheriff attempting to capture Bennet and the gang. Bennet's Raiders ride to their main hideout of Puerto de Fuego, an anarchist community of outsiders and desperados. When Bennet and the other Raiders leave to partake in a train robbery, Fletcher accosts Maria, Vance's girlfriend, and they begin an affair.

Vance confronts Maria and Fletcher; the latter subsequently kills him in self-defense. Later, Fletcher suggests to Maria and the Raiders that they rob the Willow Creek Bank, disguising themselves as ordinary citizens to lower the chances of gunplay. After testing Fletcher's ruthlessness with a mock duel, Bennet agrees to the plan. The robbery runs smoothly until a peasant boy recognises Bennet and blows his cover. Siringo, revealing himself as an undercover Pinkerton agent, captures Bennet and aids the local authorities in killing Jason, Maximillian and Aaron. Fletcher and Maria return to Puerto del Fuego with the stolen money, but Maria dies from wounds sustained in the battle. Driven to madness by Maria's death and Siringo's betrayal, Fletcher declares leadership of Bennet's Raiders, turning Puerto del Fuego into a fascist state fuelled by money, violence and fear.

In Silvertown, a vigilante posse is organized to eliminate Bennet's Raiders, as they are cutting a swathe through their profits. Siringo and Bennet, who has lost his passion for violence as a result of his friendship with Fletcher and the death of the peasant boy during the robbery, refuse to lead the vigilantes, but Zachary Shawn, a former, jailed member of the Raiders, agrees. The next morning, Bennet escapes from his prison cell and rides to Puerto del Fuego, where he finds many innocent people massacred.

As Fletcher attempts to take the other refugees across a desert, one of the transport wagons breaks down, and the people on board are forced to travel on foot. Upon being separated, the group is wiped out by Zachary's vigilantes. Bennet meets Fletcher and the others just as the vigilantes prepare to attack. As the refugees escape, Fletcher and Bennet prepare to hold Zachary's gang off. Siringo arrives to stop the posse, killing Zachary and a vigilante to prevent further bloodshed, and confronts Bennet and Fletcher alone. Fletcher, angry at Siringo for his betrayal of the Raiders and the people of Puerto del Fuego, prepares to kill him, but he is shot by Bennet. Expressing regret over his unfulfilled plans for Bennet's Raiders, Fletcher dies. Bennet allows Siringo to execute him, but Siringo, noticing Bennet's desire for redemption, shoots the face of the vigilante's corpse, creating a "fake" Bennet to present to the authorities. Confused but thankful, Bennet rides off to start a new life with the refugees.

== Cast ==
- Gian Maria Volonté as Professor Brad Fletcher (Brett Fletcher in Italian)
- Tomas Milian as Solomon "Beauregard" (Beau) Bennet
- William Berger as Charley "Chas" A. Siringo
- Jolanda Modio as Maria
- Carole André as Annie
- Gianni Rizzo as Williams
- Lidya Alfonsi as Belle de Winton
- Ángel del Pozo as Maximilian de Winton
- Aldo Sanbrell as Zachary Shawn (Zachary Shot in Italian)
- Nello Pazzafini as Vance
- José Torres as Aaron Chase
- Linda Veras as Cathy, Fletcher's Mistress
- Antonio Casas as Leading Citizen of Puerto del Fuego
- Frank Braña as Jason
- Guy Heron as Sheriff at de Winton Plantation
- Rossella D'Aquino as Sally, Purgatory City Hotel Maid (Sandy in Italian)
- Giovanni Ivan Scratuglia as Taylor Henchman
- Lorenzo Robledo as Wallace
- Francisco Sanz as Rusty Rogers

== Release ==
Face to Face was released in November 1967.

== Reception ==
A contemporary review, reviewing a 102-minute version of the film in the Monthly Film Bulletin noted that the "script is so tediously predictable that interest fades well before the halfway mark" stating that "some very obvious cuts [...] may be partly to blame".

== Bibliography ==
- Cox, Alex; Jones, Nick (1993). Moviedrome: The Guide 2 (PDF). London: BBC. Archived from the original (PDF) on 2016-07-17.
- Hughes, Howard (2009). Once Upon A Time in the Italian West: The Filmgoers' Guide to Spaghetti Westerns. I.B. Tauris & Co Ltd. ISBN 978-1-85043-896-0.
- Fisher, Austin (2014). Radical Frontiers in the Spaghetti Western: Politics, Violence and Popular Italian Cinema. I.B.Tauris.
