= Interlenghi =

Interlenghi is an Italian surname. Notable people with the surname include:

- Antonella Interlenghi (born 1960), Italian actress, daughter of Franco
- Franco Interlenghi (1931–2015), Italian actor and producer
