= Yanti =

Yanti may refer to:

- Yanti Kusmiati, former Indonesian badminton player
- Yanti Somer, Finnish actress
