= Linda Veras =

Italian actress and glamour model

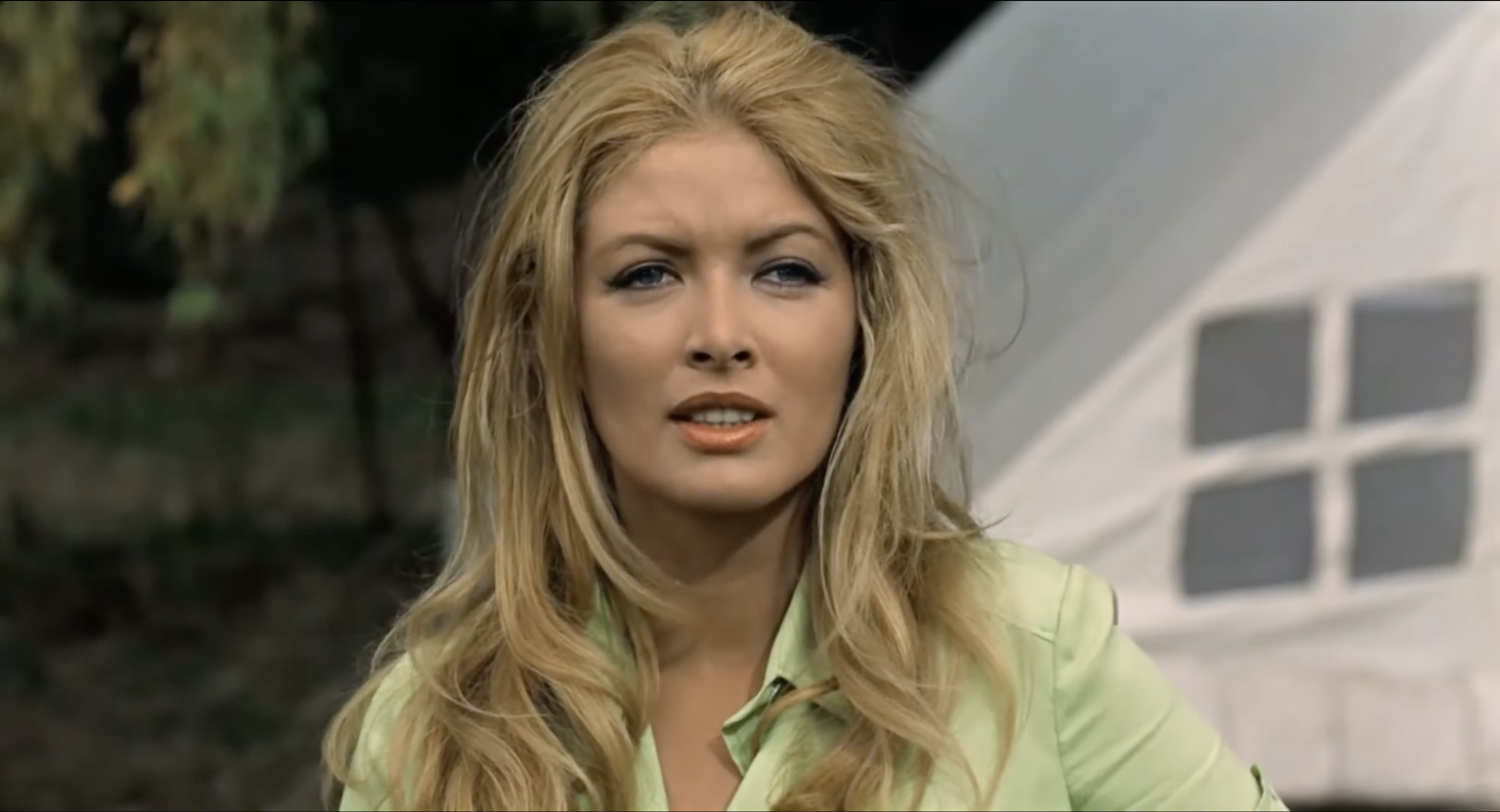
- Veras in Gungala, the Virgin of the Jungle (1967)
- Born: Sieglinda Veras; 1939 (age 86–87); Bolzano, Italy
- Occupations: Actress; model
- Years active: 1959-1971
- Known for: Romance of a Horsethief; Face to Face; Run, Man, Run; Sabata; General della Rovere

Linda Veras (born Sieglinda Veras in 1939) is a former Italian actress and glamour model. She is best known for her appearances in Spaghetti Westerns, namely Sergio Sollima's Face to Face and Run, Man, Run, and Gianfranco Parolini's Sabata.

== Filmography ==
Year	Title	Role	Notes
1959	General della Rovere	German attendant	
1961	The Connection	Siren	
1963	Contempt	Siren	
1967	Sexy Gang	Michelle	
1967	Gungala, Virgin of the Jungle	Fleur	
1967	Face to Face	Cathy, Fletcher's Mistress	
1968	God Made Them... I Kill Them	Suzanne	
1968	Playmates	Sophie Verdier	
1968	Run, Man, Run	Penny Bannington	
1969	Sabata	Jane	
1970	Chapaqua's Gold	Moira Shannon	
1971	Romance of a Horsethief	Countess Grabowsky	(final film role)
