= The Three Fantastic Supermen =

- Directed by: Gianfranco Parolini
- Screenplay by: Marcello Coscia; Gianfranco Parolini
- Story by: Gianfranco Parolini
- Starring: Luciano Stella; Brad Harris; Aldo Canti
- Cinematography: Francesco Izzarelli
- Edited by: Edmondo Lozzi
- Music by: Ruggero Cini; Jimmy Fontana
- Production companies: Cinesecolo; Parnass Film; CFFP; Avala Film
- Release dates: 1967 (Italy); September 3, 1969 (France)
- Running time: 94 minutes
- Countries: Italy; Yugoslavia; France; West Germany

The Three Fantastic Supermen (Italian: I fantastici tre supermen) is a 1967 superhero film directed by Gianfranco Parolini. The film was the first in a series of Three Supermen films.

== Cast ==
- Luciano Stella as Tony
- Brad Harris as Brad McCallum
- Aldo Canti as Nick
- Carlo Tamberlani as Professor Schwarz
- Jochen Brockmann as Golem
- Rossella Bergarmonti as Diana
- Gloria Paul as Havana
- Zorica Gajdas as Rose
- Sabin Sun

== Production ==
The Three Fantastic Supermen was conceived during the period of a superhero film cycle during the mid-1960s in Italy. Howard Hughes described The Three Fantastic Supermen as being patterned after the film Superargo and the Faceless Giants. The director Gianfranco Parolini had worked in several genres including sword-and-sandal films where there are more than one hero helping each other achieve their goals. He also commented on the stunts in the film, noting that they were done on set with actor Aldo Canti having to jump out of 20 feet high window, jump into a trampoline and jump into a truck which was moving at full speed.

Parolini directed several Kommissar X films co-starring Tony Kendall and Brad Harris. Former stuntman Aldo Canti billed as "Nick Jordan" appeared in Parolini's Five for Hell and Sabata films. The film was entirely shot in Yugoslavia.

== Release ==
The Three Fantastic Supermen was released in Italy in 1967. In his book Diabolika: Supercriminals, Superheroes and the Comic Book Universe in Italian Cinema, Roberto Curti described the film as a "reasonable box office success in Italy". It was released in France on 3 September 1969.

The film spawned several sequels where the trio of heroes showing up in Japan (Three Supermen at Tokyo, 1968), Africa (Three Supermen in the Jungle, 1970), Hong Kong (Supermen Against the Orient, 1973) and the American West (The Three Supermen in the West, 1973).

== Reception ==
In a contemporary review, the Monthly Film Bulletin noted that the stunt work of the title characters and their various stunt doubles "provide a welcome relief from the standard secret agent/judo syndrome" as well as that the "ingenuity of this comic strip adventure begins to pall after the first half hour, and the inevitable final holocaust in the master criminal's lair is brightened by the villain's diverting scheme to produce an army of robot villains who all look like the hero."

From retrospective reviews, Roberto Curti described the film as a "mixed bag" taking too much material from its sources such as The Phantom, Zorro and Goldfinger.

== See also ==
- List of French films of 1967
- List of German films of the 1960s
- List of Italian films of 1967
- List of Yugoslav films of the 1960s
