= Lovers and Liars =

1979 film by Mario Monicelli

- Film poster
- Directed by: Mario Monicelli
- Written by: Leonardo Benvenuti; Piero De Bernardi; Mario Monicelli; Tullio Pinelli; Paul D. Zimmerman
- Produced by: Alberto Grimaldi
- Starring: Goldie Hawn; Giancarlo Giannini; Claudine Auger; Laura Betti; Aurore Clément; Andréa Ferréol
- Cinematography: Tonino Delli Colli
- Edited by: Ruggero Mastroianni
- Music by: Ennio Morricone
- Production company: Produzioni Europee Associati
- Distributed by: United Artists
- Release date: April 25, 1979
- Running time: 120 minutes
- Countries: Italy; France
- Language: Italian

Lovers and Liars (Viaggio con Anita) is a 1979 Italian comedy film directed by Mario Monicelli and starring Goldie Hawn and Giancarlo Giannini. It is Hawn's only foreign film. It was released in the United States in February 1981.

== Plot ==
Anita is an American actress who decides to vacation in Rome. There, she becomes involved in a romance with her friend's married lover Guido.

== Cast ==
- Goldie Hawn as Anita
- Giancarlo Giannini as Guido Massacesi
- Claudine Auger as Elisa Massacesi
- Aurore Clément as Cora
- Laura Betti as Laura
- Andréa Ferréol as Noemi
- Renzo Montagnani as Teo
- Franca Tamantini as Oriana Massacesi
- Gino Santercole as Tonino, the truck driver
- Lorraine de Selle as Gennifer

== Critical reception ==
Kelly Scott of the St. Petersburg Times called the film "a strange little comedy" while The Tampa Tribune's Greg Tozian described it as "a poorly edited and dubbed Italian import". In his review of the film in The New York Times, Herbert Mitgang wrote that "the love scenes, which more or less is what this crazy, mixed up plot aims to be leading up to, lack any redeeming social value," that the writers "seem to have made up this script as they went along," that "there are inexplicable sudden cuts, as the plot wavers between the absurd and the serious," and that the film "doesn't really deserve its R rating, unless the phrase is added, For immature adults only." Donna Chernin of The Plain Dealer wrote that "perhaps the producers of Lovers and Liars hoped to cash in on Hawn's popularity following Private Benjamin and Seems Like Old Times. But in this flimsy role, nothing helps. Hawn's daft fails to surface, and Giannini looks more distraught than desirable." Film critic Gene Siskel reported that "this film is full of stupid slapstick and bad sound dubbing," and that "seeing it is a total waste of your time." In print, he said that "the two talented actors have very few serious scenes together, and the comedy bits are pathetic, involving a Smokey and the Bandit-type car crash. Hawn acts as if she is personally quite unhappy, and Giannini's lines are dubbed by an actor who speaks much too loudly." Jim Davidson of The Pittsburgh Press said that the voice of the actor who dubbed Giannini "sounds like a TV anchorman's impersonation of the Godfather." Diane Haithman of the Detroit Free Press called the film "one of those flaky romantic comedies that tries to draw sympathetic laughs through the antics of a cute American tourist going berserk in a foreign land. It's like Gidget Goes To Rome (didn't Gidget go to Rome?) except you can't take Gidget to see it because there's some nudity in it." Bob Sylva of The Sacramento Bee called the film "a cheap takeoff of [Federico] Fellini's classic La Dolce Vita" and said that "the whole yawning enterprise, which is smeary and ridiculously dubbed, should have been deep-sixed in the Trevi Fountain." A reviewer for the San Francisco Chronicle wrote that "She could do worse. He could do worse. The audience, however, couldn't possibly do worse than to watch these otherwise fine performers muddle lamely through a bewildering, irritating and ultimately doomed comedy which serves only to poke around in some peculiar and dreary recesses of distorted Italian machismo." Tim Sacco of The Des Moines Register remarked that "the entire film has the hollow sound of post-production dubbing". Eric Gerber of The Houston Post wrote that "the film obviously has been pitched at the Italian sense of humor (adultery, Catholic guilt, chauvinism and sexual hypocrisy meted out with pasta-like subtlety) and just doesn't work on this American funny bone, Hawn notwithstanding." Steve Millburg of the Omaha World-Herald opined, "I imagine even most Italians would find the movie nearly as tedious as I did" A slightly less negative review came from Robert C. Trussell of The Kansas City Star who wrote that "the film manages to effectively balance pathos with comedy, but ultimately the film fails to make a point and becomes another overlong effort in the 'so, what' category."

On review aggregator website Rotten Tomatoes, no critics' reviews are registered, although 13% of over 500 audience members gave the film a positive review, with an average rating of 2.5 out of 5. Audiences polled by CinemaScore gave the film an average grade of "D+" on an A+ to F scale.
