= Yeti: Giant of the 20th Century =

1976 film directed by Gianfranco Parolini

Yeti: The 20th Century Giant
- American film poster
- Italian: Yeti – Il gigante del 20º secolo
- Directed by: Gianfranco Parolini (Note: Credited as 'Frank Kramer'.)
- Written by: Gianfranco Parolini; Marcello Coscia; Mario di Nardo
- Produced by: Gianfranco Parolini; Mario di Nardo; Wolfranco Coccia; Nicolò Pomilia
- Starring: Antonella Interlenghi; Jim Sullivan; Tony Kendall
- Cinematography: Sandro Mancori
- Edited by: Manlio Camastro
- Music by: Sante Maria Romitelli
- Production company: Stefano Film
- Distributed by: Stefano Film (Italy)
- Release date: 23 December 1977 (Italy)
- Running time: 101 minutes
- Country: Italy

Yeti: Giant of the 20th Century (Italian: Yeti – Il gigante del 20º secolo, lit. 'Yeti: The 20th Century Giant') is a 1977 Italian monster film directed by Gianfranco Parolini (credited as 'Frank Kramer'), starring Antonella Interlenghi, Jim Sullivan and Tony Kendall. Set in Canada, the film is about an industrialist's orphaned grandchildren who befriend an awakened Yeti, whom the industrialist tries to exploit for profit.

== Plot ==
Industry tycoon Morgan Hunnicut asks his friend Professor Waterman to lead an expedition to study the giant Yeti creature found frozen in a large ice block on Newfoundland's coast. The professor does not know that Hunnicut intends to use the prehistoric creature as a trademark of its multinational industrial group. The expedition includes company representative Cliff Chandler and Morgan's grandchildren Jane and her younger brother Herbie, the latter of whom discovered the Yeti. The siblings' parents died in a plane accident, which Herbie was also in, but he survived and has been mute since.

The expedition thaws out and awakens the Yeti. However, their bright lights and camera flashes cause it to rampage, making everyone panic and rendering Jane and Herbie unconscious in the chaos. After the Yeti calms down, the children's dog Indio leads him to where they were left behind, and Jane and Herbie awaken to the Yeti towering over them. After looking at the children curiously, the Yeti takes them away, with Indio, Professor Henry, Cliff, and two other men following. After the Yeti sets the kids down, Jane sends Indio to find and lead the search party to them. Jane and Herbie discover the Yeti is friendly and befriend him as he shares fish with them. Upon seeing the kids with the Yeti, the professor believes their fur-lined and trimmed coats made the creature think they're also of his kind. Reuniting with Herbie and Jane, he also theorizes the Yeti has adopted them as family, seeing them as his son and wife, respectively.

== Cast ==
- Antonella Interlenghi as Jane Hunnicut
- Jim Sullivan as Herbert "Herbie" Hunnicut
- Tony Kendall as Cliff Chandler
- Edoardo Faieta as Morgan Hunnicut
- John Stacy as Henry Wassermann
- Aldo Canti as The Killer
- Donald O'Brien as Sergeant Stricker
- Francesco D'Adda as Benning
- Giuseppe Mattei as Kowarsky
- Claudio Zucchet as Barto
- Mimmo Crao as Yeti

== Production ==
While RKO and Universal Pictures battled over King Kong's rights, Dino De Laurentiis—the producer of the 1976 King Kong remake—announced another giant monster film which would be filmed in the Himalayas, entitled Yeti. Although his version ended up not being made, this film was a low-budget cash in on De Laurentiis' project, which aimed to beat it to theaters.

The film was produced under a then-recent film treaty between Italy and Canada (E100747 - CTS 1985 No. 18), which incentivized Italian productions to shoot in Canada. Exterior filming took place on-location in and around Toronto, while interiors and effects sequences were shot at Cinecittà Studios in Rome.

The film was the debut of 15-year-old Antonella Interlenghi, who was credited under the anglicized pseudonym "Phoenix Grant".

== Reception ==
In a contemporary review, Maurizio Porro of the Corriere della sera was most negative, writing that "[t]he film was shot on such a low budget (the rudimentary effects are accomplished through obvious image superimpositions) that in comparison, the Taviani brothers look like Cecil B. DeMille. But it is not the only issue: [...] the story and screenplay are completely missing. Mystery and suspense are absent, whereas ridiculousness is in full effect, dominating the proceedings."

== Home video ==
The film was released on Blu-ray by boutique label Code Red on May 21, 2022.
