= War of the Robots =

War of the Robots may refer to:

- War of the Robots (adventure book), a 2007 adventure book in the New Series Adventures series written by Trevor Baxendale and based on the British science fiction television series Doctor Who
- War of the Robots (film), a 1978 Italian film directed by Alfonso Brescia
- War of the Robots, Season 1, Episode 20 of Lost in Space
