= Mavie Bardanzellu =

Italian theater and film actress (1938–2022)

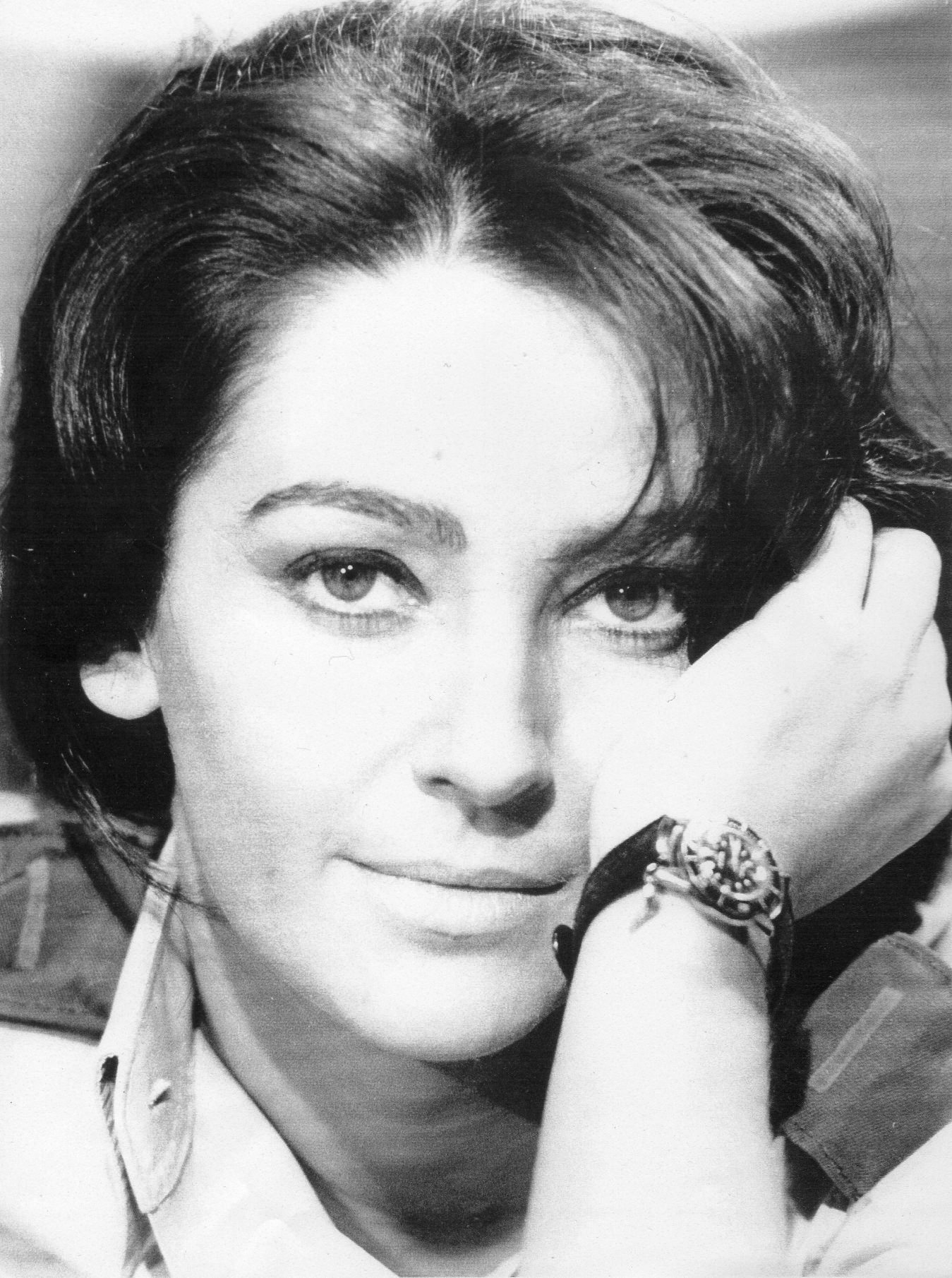
Mavie Bardanzellu

Mavie Bardanzellu (born Maria Vittoria Bardanzellu; 6 April 1938 – 5 February 2022) was an Italian stage and film actress.

== Biography ==
Mavie Bardanzellu was born in Luras, Sardinia and graduated from the Studio Fersen di Arti Sceniche in Rome, where she studied acting according to the Stanislavski method.

In 1962, she debuted as a protagonist in Una storia sarda, a neorealistic movie directed by Piero Livi. She appeared in A Question of Honour by Luigi Zampa, Menage all'italiana (1965), and in Carogne si nasce (by Alfonso Brescia) and Silvia e l’amore (by Silvio Bergonzelli), both in 1968.

In 1969, she had a role in Beatrice Cenci by Lucio Fulci, and played one of the main characters in The Battle of Sinai, an Italian-Israeli film set during the Six-Day War and directed by Maurizio Lucidi. That same year she got a lead role in Pelle di Bandito (by Piero Livi), which ran at the Venice International Film Festival.

In 1972, she worked in the film Abuso di potere (by Camillo Bazzoni).

== Death ==
Bardanzellu died on 5 February 2022, at the age of 83.

== Bibliography ==
- Poppi Roberto, Dizionario del cinema italiano. I film. Vol. 2: Tutti i film italiani, 2007.
- Autore Poppi Roberto & Pecorari Mario, Dizionario del cinema italiano. I film. Vol. 3/1: Tutti i film italiani dal 1960 al 1969, Gremese Editore, 2007.
