= Star Odyssey =

Seven Gold Men in Space
- Directed by: Alfonso Brescia; (as Al Bradley)
- Written by: Alfonso Brescia; Massimo Lo Jacono; Giacomo Mazzocchi
- Produced by: Luigi Alessi
- Starring: Yanti Somer; Gianni Garko; Malisa Longo; Chris Avram
- Cinematography: Silvio Fraschetti
- Edited by: Mariano Arditi
- Music by: Marcello Giombini
- Release date: 26 October 1979 (Italy)
- Running time: 88 minutes (Italy); 103 minutes (US)
- Country: Italy
- Language: Italian

Star Odyssey (Italian: Sette uomini d'oro nello spazio / Seven Gold Men in Space) is a 1979 Italian film directed by Alfonso Brescia. The film is also known as Space Odyssey, Metallica and Captive Planet in other video markets.

== Plot summary ==
In the year 2312, a group of aliens auction off insignificant planets and the winner of the auction for Sol 3 (Earth) is the evil despot Kress. He soon flies to "Sol 3" in what is the first contact with beings from another planet for those living there. Kress starts gathering humanoid slaves using his robot army to sell them to his evil counterparts.

Defending "Sol 3" against the new owner is the kindly Professor Maury and his ragtag band of humans, one of whom wears a Spider-Man t-shirt, and robot friends. Maury and his defenders set out to reclaim the planet from Kress and his cyborg army. Their plan is to destroy the metal of the alien ship, called Iridium (or etherium), after discovering its weakness.

After being defeated and retreating from the planet, Kress resells the planet at the space auction for a profit.

== Production ==
Star Odyssey is one of five low-budget Italian space opera films produced by director Alfonso Brescia (under the pseudonym Al Bradley) in the wake of the success of Star Wars. It is the fourth installment in the cycle, following Cosmos: War of the Planets (1977), Battle of the Stars (1978), and War of the Robots (1978); the adult-oriented The Beast in Space (1980) followed.

The production heavily re-used miniature effects, models, and costumes from Brescia's previous feature, War of the Robots. To save costs, the film utilized low-budget props; a review in Popular Mechanics noted that the "light-sabers" featured in the film were merely cardboard swords coated with fluorescent paint.

== Reception ==
The film received highly negative reviews for its technical quality. Bill Gordon of Worst Movies Ever Made found the special effects poor and characterized the narrative structure as confusing. Similarly, Popular Mechanics dismissed the film as a "dreadful trashpile", while TechRadar described it as alternating between "insufferable or hilariously bad" depending on the viewer's mindset.

== Cast ==
- Yanti Somer as Irene
- Gianni Garko as Dirk Laramie
- Malisa Longo as Bridget
- Chris Avram as Shawn
- Ennio Balbo as Professor Mauri
- Roberto Dell'Acqua as Norman
- Aldo Amoroso Pioso
- Nino Castelnuovo as Lieutenant Oliver "Hollywood" Carrera
- Gianfranca Dionisi
- Pino Ferrara as the Warden
- Aldo Funari
- Cesare Gelli
- Robert Hundar as the Auctioneer
- Claudio Undari
- Filippo Perrone
- Franco Ressel as Commander Barr
- Massimo Righi
- Silvano Tranquilli
- Roberto Messina as the Referee
- Benito Pacifico and Nello Pazzafini as the Card Players
- Claudio Zucchet

== Reception ==
"Creature Feature" found the movie to be an example of sci-fi so bad it has to be seen to be believed, giving the movie two out of five stars. Popular Mechanics noted the movie was a dreadful trashpile. Techradar found the movie either insufferable or hilariously bad, depending on your mood.
