= War of the Robots (film) =

1978 film by Alfonso Brescia

- Directed by: Alfonso Brescia
- Screenplay by: Alfonso Brescia; Aldo Crudo
- Starring: Antonio Sabàto Sr.; Yanti Somer; Malisa Longo
- Cinematography: Silvio Fraschetti
- Edited by: Carlo Reali
- Music by: Marcello Giombini
- Production companies: Koala Cinematografica; Nais Film
- Distributed by: Koala Cinematografica
- Release date: 21 April 1978 (Milan)
- Running time: 99 minutes
- Country: Italy

War of the Robots (Italian: La guerra dei robot, also released internationally as Reactor) is a 1978 Italian space opera film directed and co-written by Alfonso Brescia, and starring Antonio Sabàto Sr., Yanti Somer and Malisa Longo. The plot follows an alien civilization that, facing imminent extinction, kidnaps two famous genetic scientists from Earth, prompting a troop of soldiers to combat the humanoid robots and rescue the victims.

== Plot ==
In the future, Earth's Space Command goes on high alert when a fleet of golden-haired, humanoid androids from the dying planet Anthor launches a surprise raid on a secure research station, kidnapping geneticist Professor Carr and his assistant, Lois. Earth's military dispatches the starship Tristar, commanded by Captain John Boyd, to track the androids to their subterranean home world and rescue the scientists. The crew teams up with human rebels to fight through the citadel, rescuing the hostages and destroying the base to stop a looming energy crisis on Earth.

== Cast ==
- Antonio Sabàto Sr. as Captain John Boyd
- Yanti Somer as Julie
- Malisa Longo as Lois
- Giacomo Rossi Stuart as Roger
- Aldo Canti as Kuba, the Alien
- Venantino Venantini as Paul
- Jacques Herlin as Professor Carr
- Ines Pellegrini as Sonia
- West Buchanan as Herb
- Patrizia Gori as Trissa
- Massimo Righi as Dr. Wilkes
- Dino Scandiuzzi as Jack
- Roger Browne as Commander King
- Licinia Lentini as Commander King's assistant

== Reception ==
War of the Robots received generally negative reviews from retrospective critics. Writing for Salon, Andrew O'Hehir noted that the film was part of a larger wave of low-budget Star Wars imitations emerging from European cinema in the late 1970s.

Film critic R.D. Francis characterized it as part of an interconnected cycle of "spacesploitation" features directed by Alfonso Brescia that recycled the same sets, models, props, and cast members. The other films in this thematic group include Cosmos: War of the Planets (1977), Star Odyssey (1979), and the adult-oriented The Beast in Space (1980).
