= Run, Man, Run =

1968 film

- Film poster
- Directed by: Sergio Sollima
- Screenplay by: Sergio Sollima; Pompeo De Angelis
- Story by: Sergio Sollima
- Produced by: Alvaro Mancori; Anna Maria Chretien
- Starring: Tomas Milian; Donal O'Brien; Linda Veras; John Ireland; Chelo Alonso
- Cinematography: Guglielmo Mancori
- Edited by: Tatiana Casini Morigi
- Music by: Bruno Nicolai; Ennio Morricone (uncredited)
- Production company: Mancori–Chretien
- Distributed by: Ital-Noleggio Cinematografico
- Release date: 29 August 1968
- Running time: 120 minutes
- Countries: Italy; France
- Language: Italian
- Box office: 1,000,146,000 ITL (Italy)

Run, Man, Run (Italian: Corri uomo corri, also known as Big Gundown 2) is an Italian-French Zapata Western film. It is the second film of Sergio Sollima centred on the character of Cuchillo, again played by Tomas Milian, after the two-years earlier successful western The Big Gundown. It is also the final chapter of the political-western trilogy of Sollima, which includes Face to Face, and his last spaghetti western. According to the same Sollima, Run, Man, Run is the most politic, the most revolutionary and even anarchic among his movies.

== Plot ==
When Cuchillo returns to his hometown in Mexico he soon finds himself in prison, sharing a cell with a dangerous desperado, the poet Ramirez. Despite a pardon and release in one day, Ramirez hires Cuchillo to help him escape. Waiting for his release are numerous bounty hunters eager for the price on Ramirez's head. Evading the hunters, they make it to Ramirez's village, but only minutes before the revolutionary bandit Reza arrives. Ramirez is shot but before he dies, he passes information to Cuchillo regarding $3M in hidden gold, and charges him with returning it to the revolutionary leader, Santillana. Hot on Cuchillo's trail are French mercenaries serving President Diaz, Reza and his bandits, an American gunslinger, and Cuchillo's fiancé, Dolores...who simply wants Cuchillo to stop running and marry her. Deceptions and double-crosses rule as all parties race to discover the gold cache.

== Cast ==
- Tomas Milian: Manuel "Cuchillo" Sanchez
- Donal O'Brien: Nathaniel Cassidy
- Linda Veras: Penny Bannington
- John Ireland: Santillana
- Chelo Alonso: Dolores
- Marco Guglielmi: Colonel Michel Sévigny
- José Torres: Ramirez
- Edward Ross: Jean-Paul
- Nello Pazzafini: Riza
- Gianni Rizzo: Mayor Christopher Bannington
- Dan May: Mateos Gonzalez
- Noé Murayama: Pablo
- Attilio Dottesio: Manuel Etchevaria
- Orso Maria Guerrini: Raul
- Federico Boido: Steve Wilkins
- Calisto Calisti: Fernando Lopez

== Soundtrack ==
In addition to composing a large amount of film scores himself, Bruno Nicolai also conducted many of Ennio Morricone's film scores. In an interview in the featurette Run Man Run: 35 Years Running, director Sergio Sollima stated that Morricone, who was then contracted with Universal Pictures was not allowed to work for any other film company, but composed the score to the film without credit.
