= Desert Commandos =

- Italian film poster
- Attentato ai tre grandi
- Directed by: Umberto Lenzi
- Screenplay by: Umberto Lenzi
- Story by: Umberto Lenzi
- Produced by: Alberto Grimaldi
- Starring: Ken Clark; Horst Frank; Jeanne Valérie; Carlo Hintermann; Howard Ross; Fabienne Dali; Franco Fantasia; Gianni Rizzo
- Cinematography: Carlo Carlini
- Edited by: Eugenio Alabiso
- Music by: Angelo Francesco Lavagnino
- Production companies: PEA; Constantin Film; Films Ege
- Distributed by: PEA; Constantin Film
- Release dates: 1 December 1967 (Italy): 15 March 1968 (West Germany)
- Running time: 96 minutes
- Countries: Italy; France; West Germany
- Language: Italian

Desert Commandos (Italian: Attentato ai tre grandi) is a 1967 French/Italian/West German international co-production war film set during World War II in Morocco where it was filmed. The Italian title (Attack on the Big Three) refers to a German commando group with a mission to assassinate Churchill, Roosevelt and de Gaulle at the Casablanca Conference.

The film is a character-based drama that focuses on the German soldiers' various drives and conflicts during encounters with Tuareg nomads, and French and American soldiers.

== Plot ==
The grief-stricken Captain Fritz Schoeller has assisted his terminally ill wife with her wishes for euthanasia. A party of men whisk him from his wife's funeral, not for arrest, but to be briefed on a special mission he will lead. The Captain, Lt. Roland Wolf, Sgt. Erich Huber, Corporal Hans Ludwig and Private Willy Mainz are all skilled in commando tactics and have excellent English language skills. They are dressed in British Commando uniforms and parachuted into Morocco where Faddja Hassen, an Arab woman will guide them to Casablanca where they will assassinate Allied leaders.

== Cast ==
- Ken Clark: Captain Fritz Schoeller
- Horst Frank: Lt. Roland Wolf
- Jeanne Valérie: Faddja Hassen
- Carlo Hintermann: Sgt. Erich Huber
- Howard Ross: Willy Mainz
- Franco Fantasia: Major Dalio
- Hardy Reichelt: Corporal Hans Ludwig
- Fabienne Dali: Simone
- John Stacy: Sir Bryan
- Tom Felleghy: Colonel Ross
- Gianni Rizzo: Perrier

== Release ==
The film was released in West Germany on March 15, 1968, as Fünf gegen Casablanca.
