= Requiem for a Secret Agent =

- Directed by: Sergio Sollima
- Written by: Sergio Donati; Antonio del Amo; Sergio Sollima
- Produced by: Alberto Grimaldi
- Starring: Stewart Granger; Daniela Bianchi; Peter van Eyck; Giulio Bosetti; María Granada; Benny Deus; Luis Induni; Enrique Navarro; Franco Andrei; Mirella Pamphili; John Karlsen; Gianni Rizzo; Giorgia Moll
- Cinematography: Carlo Carlini
- Music by: Antonio Pérez Olea; Piero Umiliani (uncredited)
- Release date: 15 October 1966
- Running time: 102 minutes
- Countries: Italy; Spain; West Germany
- Box office: 203,014 admissions (France); 1,129,042 admissions (Spain)

Requiem for a Secret Agent (also known as Requiem per un agente segreto) is an Italian international co-production Eurospy film. It was co-produced with Spain (where it was released as Consigna: Tánger 67) and West Germany (where it was released as Der Chef schickt seinen besten Mann).

The film was directed by Sergio Sollima. It was Sollima's third and last Eurospy film and the first he directed under his real name (in the two previous spy films he was credited as Simon Sterling). It was shot in Morocco.

== Plot ==
While driving through the streets of Tangier in a convertible, O’Brien notices that he is being followed. Stopping for petrol, O’Brien kills his pursuer. Later, he finds that Bressart, a man he was supposed to meet with, is dead. He is then killed by Alexej, who works for former Nazi intelligence officer Rubeck.

The American secret services operating in Morocco need a replacement for agent A139. The man running the service does not think that a conventional agent will be effective against Rubeck's syndicate, and instructs Moran to contact British agent John Merrill, and bring him to Tangier. Merrill, who has the code name Bingo, has been helping a family escape from East Germany, but only in exchange for all their valuables.

In Tangier, Merrill sees that fellow passenger Evelyn has a gun in her handbag. Ever the gentleman, Bingo removes the gun, smuggles it through security without her knowledge, and then returns it to her. He is met at the airport by Olafson, a Norwegian agent who - together with his colleague Edith - explains their side of the mission. Rubeck was responsible for the bombing of a U.N. airplane carrying Norwegian mediators to peace negotiations in Egypt, so Merrill's job is to both neutralise Rubeck's organisation and to send him to Norway to stand trial.

Bingo and Olafson track down Bressart's lover Betty Lou, but Rubeck has anticipated this and has stationed two of his men in her room. Merrill and Olafson kill the henchmen, but Betty Lou flees before they can talk to her. Evelyn meets Betty Lou and reveals that she is Bressart's wife, and has come to Tangier to avenge his death. Bingo tries to speak to Betty Lou, but Alexej kills her, leaving Evelyn with the idea that Bingo was responsible. Alexej had been found and adopted as a young boy by Rubeck in Poland during World War II, and Rubeck has raised him as his protege.

Assuming that Bingo was also responsible for her husband's death, Evelyn hires locals to kill him, but Bingo overpowers them and visits her to demand an explanation. He slaps her, and reveals what really happened, but she does not believe his story and pulls out her gun. In the ensuing struggle, she is shot and killed by her own gun.

Bingo decides to use Evelyn's death to find Rubeck, and persuades the Moroccan police that a blonde European was the killer. Rubeck is one of the suspects picked up by the police, and once he has been positively identified by Edith, Bingo and Olafson kidnap him. After Bingo threatens to roast him in an oven, Rubeck provides details about his syndicate, but is then rescued by Alexej. Bingo escapes by jumping through a window, and returns to Tangier where Edith tends to his injuries. Meanwhile Olafson has broken into Rubeck's house and stolen incriminating documents.

Rubeck realises the weakness of his position and makes a deal with the Americans, so that he will betray his organisation in exchange for immunity from prosecution for himself and Alexej. Bingo is offered a financial bonus, and agrees to square the deal with the Norwegians. With this in mind, Bingo waits until Olafson goes out, then seduces Edith, steals the documents that Olafson had obtained, and hands them to Moran.

Rubeck arranges a meeting of his syndicate on a yacht, then he and Bingo ensure that it is blown up, killing the senior members of the gang. Moran promises Bingo more money if he can dig up enough evidence to ensure that Rubeck is convicted. Olafson realises that Bingo has betrayed him and berates him about his morals and character, but he still believes he and Edith know enough to ensure that Rubeck will be prosecuted in Norway. However, Alexej overhears the conversation, murders Olafson and plans to eliminate Edith as well.

Edith plans to fly to Oslo, but Rubeck anticipates this and sends Alexej to the airport to intercept her. Edith runs away but Alexej traps her in a hangar and is about to kill her when Bingo arrives and beats him in a fist fight. He goes to Rubeck's villa, where Rubeck pulls a gun on him and calls for help from Moran. But Bingo had previously removed the magazine from the gun, leaving Rubeck at his mercy. Bingo decides not to kill Rubeck, but to hand him over to Norwegian agents, infuriating Moran and sacrificing his payment from the Americans. It seems that his interaction with Olafson has enabled Bingo to find his conscience.

Edith tries again to go to Oslo, but this time she is intercepted by Bingo. They drive into the sunset together.

== Cast ==
- Stewart Granger: John Merrill
- Daniela Bianchi: Evelyn
- Peter van Eyck: Oscar Rubeck
- Giulio Bosetti: Erik Olafson
- Maria Granada: Betty Lou
- Giorgia Moll: Edith
- John Karlsen: The old man
- Luis Induni: Charles Bressart
- Gianni Rizzo: Atenopoulos
- Benny Deus: Moran
- Enrique Navarro: Galvao
- Franco Andrei: Ned Robbins
- Wolf Hillinger: Alexej
- Mirella Pamphili: Stripper

== Soundtrack ==
The film's theme song was "Before it's Too Late", sung by Lydia MacDonald.
