= Mission to Hell =

1964 film

- Directed by: Gianfranco Parolini
- Written by: Wolf C. Hartwig; Johannes Kai
- Produced by: Wolf C. Hartwig
- Starring: Paul Hubschmid; Marianne Hold
- Cinematography: Rolf Kästel
- Music by: Martin Böttcher
- Distributed by: Variety Distribution
- Release dates: 30 January 1964 (Japan); 19 June 1964 (West Germany); 24 March 1965 (France)
- Countries: West Germany; Italy; France
- Languages: German; English; Thai

Mission to Hell (German: Die Diamantenholle am Mekong, French: Les diamants du Mekong, Italian: La sfida viene da Bangkok) is a 1964 West German-French-Italian spy film written and directed by Gianfranco Parolini and starring Paul Hubschmid. One of the first Eurospy productions, it was a box office success.

== Cast ==
- Paul Hubschmid as Werner Homfeld
- Marianne Hold as Dr. Vivian Lancaster
- Horst Frank as Jack McLean
- Brad Harris as Joe Warren
- Dorothee Parker as Gloria Pickerstone
- Chris Howland as Archibald "Smokie" Smoke
- Philippe Lemaire as Richard
- Gianni Rizzo as John Yakiris
- Michèle Mahaut as Jeanette May-Wong
- Adriana Ambesi as Tänzerin
- Reinhard Glemnitz as Journalist
- Elisabeth Volkmann as Secretary
