= Man of the East =

Man of the East (E poi lo chiamarono il magnifico)
- US film poster
- Directed by: E.B. Clucher
- Written by: E.B. Clucher
- Produced by: Alberto Grimaldi
- Starring: Terence Hill; Gregory Walcott; Harry Carey Jr; Dominic Barto; Yanti Somer; Riccardo Pizzuti; Enzo Fiermonte; Danika La Loggia; Jean Louis; Alessandro Sperli; Salvatore Borghese; Antonio Montelesan; Luigi Casellato; Steffen Zacharias; Pupo De Luca
- Cinematography: Aldo Giordani
- Edited by: Eugenio Alabiso; Enzo Ocone
- Music by: Oliver Onions
- Production companies: Produzioni Europee Associati (PEA); Les Productions Artistes Associés
- Distributed by: United Artists Europa
- Release date: 9 September 1972
- Running time: 127 minutes
- Countries: Italy; France
- Language: Italian

Man of the East (Italian: E poi lo chiamarono il magnifico) is a 1972 Italian Spaghetti Western film directed by E.B. Clutcher starring Terence Hill.

The film is set in the Wild West during the time of the railway construction. A recurring theme is the always progressing modernisation which some of the protagonists are trying to escape. The original title E poi lo chiamarono il Magnifico (translatable as And then they called him the Magnificent One) was chosen to capitalize on the success of the two previous movies by E.B. Clutcher, both starring Terrence Hill, They Call Me Trinity and Trinity Is Still My Name, even if in this movies there are different characters and Bud Spencer, historic sidekick of Terrence Hill/Trinity, is not featured.

== Plot ==
The young English nobleman Sir Thomas Fitzpatrick Phillip Moore arrives in the West following the wish of his late father who years earlier had to leave England due to an affair. The trouble led to a conflict with "Vicci Windsor". In the West, the young man joins up with his father's former pals, the stagecoach robbers Monkey, Holy Joe and Bull.

The characters are introduced as time moves on during Tom's journey, beginning with Bull who works at a stagecoach station disguised as a mute man. After Bull has listened in on the conversation of two headhunters and found out about the death of "The Englishman" (Tom's father), he begins a journey of his own. In a small town he finds a preacher in his church, conducting a fiery sermon to a somewhat dubious audience of drunkards, gamblers and easy women who he had to drive into his church just as he had to have the saloon's pianola moved into the church right before. Both of them then proceed to Yuma, where the third one, Monkey is in jail as usual. Through deceit they manage to free Monkey after they manage to keep him from taking revenge on the sadistic warden, because according to Holy on the day of the Lord you don't shoot people. From there they travel to the Englishman's gang's old hideout in the mountain, which is also the destination of Tom's journey, who had just before been in a stagecoach robbery performed by the masked trio of Monkey, Bull and Holy.

Tom was just about to inspect the property around the log cabin when suddenly his walking stick is shot out from under him by the three crooks, who do not know who Tom is and therefore suspect him to have come back to retrieve the stolen money.

Soon the situation is explained by Tom showing them a photograph of his father along with giving Holy a letter of his father for the three of them.

In his letter the father asks them to make a "real man" out of his progress-loving son. Initially they fail miserably since Tom refuses to touch a weapon and would rather ride his bicycle than a horse. This changes once he meets Candida in the town's thrift store, the landowner's daughter who he had once met before when she travelled in the same train as him and had captivated his thoughts. There she asks for Books of Lord Byron, which he can procure, unlike the trader. Candida returns his love.

Since Morton, Candida's father's rough ranch administrator has also set his eyes on the girl this leads to several brawls during which Tom initially ends up on the receiving side. Only after an intensive course in all things brawling, shooting and spitting which his father's accomplices put him through Tom not only manages to put Morton in his place but also Candida's father who has been convinced of Tom's skills. It ends with a happy end although Monkey, Bull and Holy leave the town in which progress has taken a footing, driving them to flee further toward the west. In the last scene they reach the Pacific, shocked to hear the whistle of a steam train and so they turned back.

== Cast ==
- Terence Hill as Sir Thomas Fitzpatrick Phillip Moore
- Gregory Walcott as Bull Smith
- Yanti Somer as Candida Olsen
- Dominic Barto as Monkey Smith
- Harry Carey Jr. as Holy Joe (as Harry Carey)
- Enzo Fiermonte as Frank Olsen
- Danika La Loggia as Iris
- Riccardo Pizzuti as Morton Clayton
- Jean Louis as Prison Warden
- Alessandro Sperli as Tim
- Salvatore Borghese as Cacciatore di taglie (as Salvatore Borgese)
- Steffen Zacharias as Stalliere
- Luigi Casellato as Padrone del ristoro
- Pupo De Luca as Direttore del carcere
- Antonio Monselesan as Cacciatore di taglie (as Tony Norton)
- Rigal Suzanne Leone
- Kevin Richmond
- Zach Bell

== Production ==
Location scenes were filmed at Plitvice Lakes National Park in Yugoslavia (now Croatia).

The film contains several running gags, like the three friends constantly being chased by two bounty hunters. During each encounter one of the three appears behind them, when they are just about to get to business with the others.

Bull every time slams their heads through a then destroyed table, making them appear more bandaged with each new additional encounter.

Another running gag is the calendar problem. Since for the Western heroes every day is a Saturday, Tom has his fair share of problems coordinating meetings with them.

Additionally, there is Bull's Yorkshire Terrier which he stole from a lady during the stagecoach robbery earlier and which he carries around with him. Every time he hands the dog to another person that person has to clean their hands afterwards since the dog appears to not be in control of his bladder.

The story is fairly similar to the comic "The Tenderfoot" from the series Lucky Luke. It is not clear if there is any correlation between the film and the comic. However, in the early 1990s Terence Hill directed and played a TV adaptation of Lucky Luke.
