= Le tue mani =

1970 Easter song written by Marcello Giombini

- Hymn
- English: Your hands
- Occasion: Easter
- Text: by Marcello Giombini
- Language: Italian
- Melody: by Marcello Giombini
- Published: 1970

Le tue mani is a 1970 Easter song written by Marcello Giombini. It has become popular in Sweden as Dina händer är fulla av blommor, with 1972 Swedish-language lyrics by Lars Åke Lundberg.

The song is a so-called response song, which is sung between men and women, and was probably first presented in Sweden at a hymnology seminar during the early 1970s, before Lars Åke Lundberg wrote lyrics in Sweden. However, he wrote the fourth verse as a prayer to the resurrected Jesus. The 1976 Church Assembly wanted to change lyrics. That caused Lars Åke Lundberg to withdraw his entire propose for lyrics, and all verses were approved.

== Publications ==
=== Swedish-language version ===
Published as number 154 in:

- Den svenska psalmboken 1986,
- 1986 års Cecilia-psalmbok
- Psalmer och Sånger 1987
- Segertoner 1988
- Frälsningsarméns sångbok 1990 under the lines "Påsk" (Easter).
