= Jaroslav Šabata =

Czech political scientist, psychologist, and dissident (1927-2012)

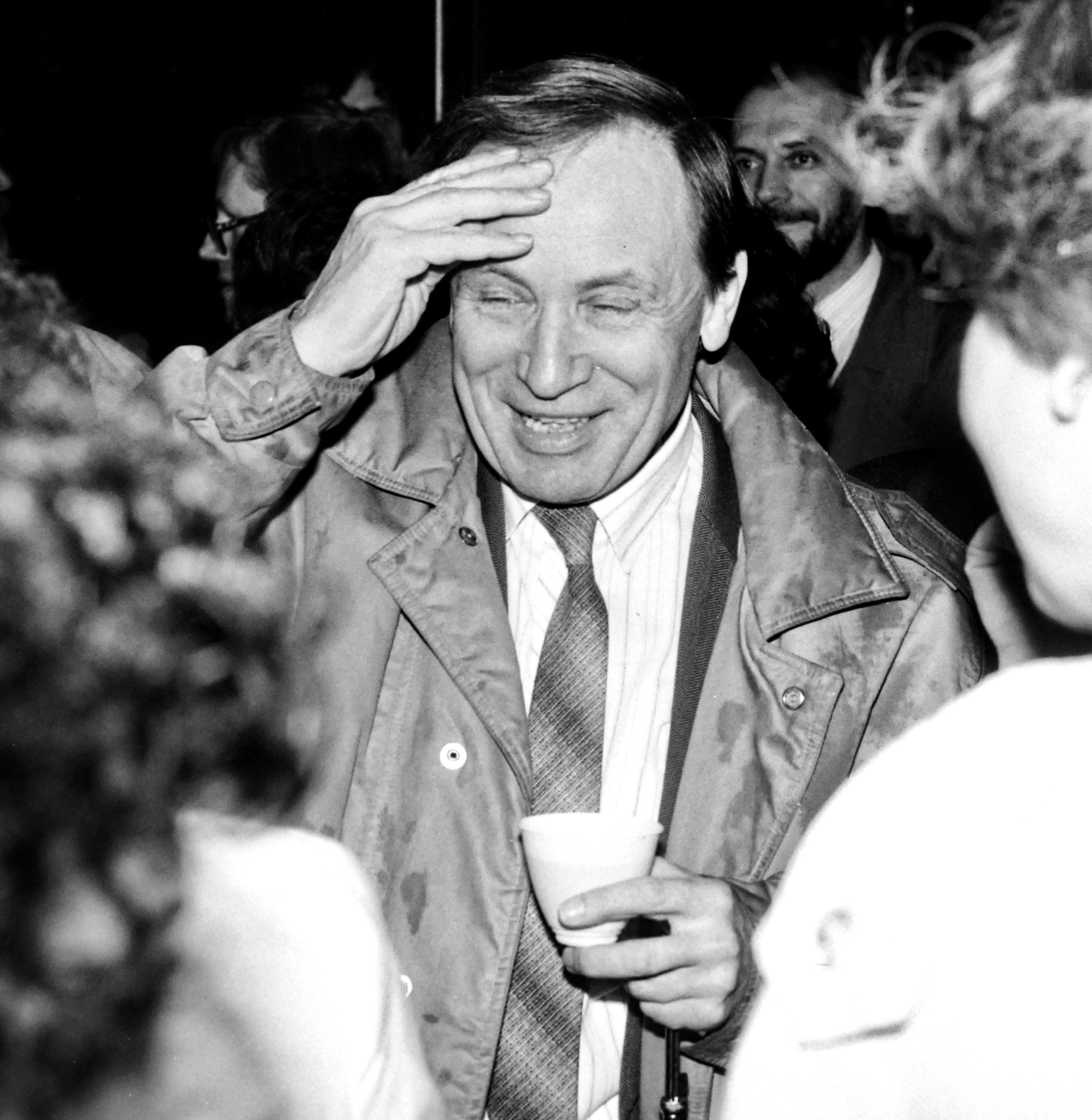
Image of Sabata

Jaroslav Šabata (2 November 1927 – 14 June 2012) was a Czech political scientist, psychologist, and dissident during Czechoslovakia's Communist era. A leading dissident based in Brno, Šabata was a signatory of Charter 77 in 1977. He served as the spokesman of Charter 77, the organization named for the document, from 1978 to 1981.

Sabata was born in Dolenice, South Moravian Region, Czechoslovakia, on 2 November 1927. He taught psychology at present-day Masaryk University throughout the 1950s and 1960s.

Šabata joined the Communist Party of Czechoslovakia in the aftermath of World War II. He became a prominent government supporter of the Prague Spring in 1968. He left the party in 1969, soon after the Prague Spring was crushed by the Soviets, and resigned from his political positions. He founded Communists in Opposition, a dissident group, during the early 1970s. He was twice jailed for his opposition to the government as a political prisoner for a total of seven years: The first from 1971 to 1976, after founding Communists in Opposition, and again from 1978 to 1981, after signing Charter 77.

He was a signatory of the Charter 77 manifest and served as the group's spokesperson from 1978 to 1981, even as he was imprisoned during the same years.

Šabata re-entered politics after the 1989 Velvet Revolution and the Fall of Communism in Czechoslovakia. He represented the Civic Forum (OF), a Czechoslovak anti-authoritarian movement formed during the Velvet Revolution. He was elected as a deputy to the Federal Assembly of Czechoslovakia, which continued to exist until the county's dissolution in 1993. He also served as a Minister Without Portfolio in the government of Czech Republic Prime Minister Petr Pithart, another Charter 77 signer, within the Civic Forum from 1990 to 1992. (The Czech Republic was still an internal region within Czechoslovakia during this time)

Following the Dissolution of Czechoslovakia, Šabata became a member and foreign policy adviser to the Czech Social Democratic Party.

Jaroslav Šabata died in Brno, Czech Republic, on 14 June 2012, at the age of 84.
