= Ignazio Spalla =

Italian film actor (1924–1995)

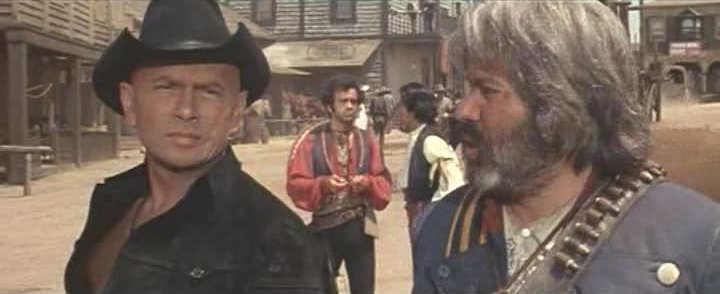
- Yul Brynner and Ignazio Spalla in Adios, Sabata (1970)
- Born: 5 May 1924; Termini Imerese, Italy
- Died: 9 February 2005 (aged 80); Costacciaro, Italy
- Other name: Pedro Sanchez
- Occupation: Actor
- Years active: 1964–1977

Ignazio Spalla (5 May 1924 – 2005), known professionally as Pedro Sanchez, was an Italian character actor associated with the Spaghetti Western genre during its peak production years. He is included among notable Italian character actors in 100 caratteristi del cinema italiano (2006), a reference work dedicated to supporting performers in Italian cinema.

== Early life ==
Spalla was born on 5 May 1924. Some film reference sources list Siena as his birthplace, while other accounts identify Termini Imerese, Sicily. Documentation regarding his birthplace varies among sources.

== Career ==
Spalla's career was spent largely within the Italian Western film cycle. He frequently portrayed Mexican characters, gunfighters, and outlaws, and became a recognizable supporting presence in the genre. His roles were often dubbed by actor Carlo Romano.

His earliest documented appearance was in Bullets in the Flesh (1965), directed by Marino Girolami under the pseudonym Fred Wilson. He subsequently appeared in Blood for a Silver Dollar (1965), directed by Giorgio Ferroni.

In Sabata (1969), director Gianfranco Parolini cast Spalla as Garrincha, the comic companion to Lee Van Cleef's title character. According to 100 caratteristi del cinema italiano, the character attracted audience attention and contributed to his continued participation in related productions. He later appeared in Adios, Sabata (1970), alongside Yul Brynner.

During the 1970s, Spalla appeared primarily in comic Western productions, including Seven Nuns in Kansas City (1974) and Carambola (1974). As production of Italian Westerns declined, his screen appearances became less frequent, concluding with Trinity Plus the Clown and a Guitari (1975), directed by Franz Antel.

Outside the Western genre, he appeared in Shoot loud, louder...I don't understand! (1966), directed by Eduardo De Filippo, and Hitch Hike (1977), directed by Pasquale Festa Campanile.

== Death ==
Ignazio Spalla died in 2005.

== Partial filmography ==
- Two Gangsters in the Wild West (1964) - Uomo con Rio
- Bullet in the Flesh (1964) - Slim McClear
- I figli del leopardo (1964) - Babalone's Henchman
- Blood for a Silver Dollar (1965) - Granjero
- Two Sergeants of General Custer (1965) - Northern Adjutant
- Perché uccidi ancora (1965) - Rojo
- Seven Golden Men Strike Again (1966)
- Go with God, Gringo (1966) - Mexico
- Thompson 1880 (1966) - Pancho - Brady's Henchman
- Shoot Loud, Louder... I Don't Understand (1966) - Carmelo Vitiello
- Two Sons of Ringo (1966) - El Indio
- Pecos Cleans Up (1967) - Dago
- Son of Django (1967) - Thompson
- La morte non conta i dollari (1967) - Pablo Rodriguez
- No Diamonds for Ursula (1967) - Caravella
- Cjamango (1967) - Paco
- Any Gun Can Play (1967) - Pajondo / Bahunda
- Don't Wait, Django... Shoot! (1967) - Barrica
- I barbieri di Sicilia (1967)
- Johnny Hamlet (1968) - Guild
- Vengeance (1968) - Laredo's Henchman (uncredited)
- May God Forgive You... But I Won't (1968) - Garcia Ramirez 'Barrica'
- Zorro the Fox (1968) - Sergeant Gomez
- The Nephews of Zorro (1968) - Sergeante Alvarez
- Pagó cara su muerte (1969)
- Sabata (1969) - Carrincha
- The Conspiracy of Torture (1969) - Catalano
- Quintana (1969) - Pater Mansueto
- Adiós, Sabata (1969) - Escudo
- Reverend's Colt (1970) - Meticcio
- Tara Pokì (1971) - Don Fifi
- Return of Sabata (1971) - Bronco
- La vergine di Bali (1972) - Pedro Porfirio
- Sotto a chi tocca! (1972) - Pietro
- Three Supermen of the West (1973) - Navajo Joe
- Seven Nuns in Kansas City (1973) - Bart
- Carambola (1974) - Mexican Leader
- Trinity Plus the Clown and a Guitar (1975) - Poker Player
- White Fang and the Gold Diggers (1975) - Dollar
- White Fang and the Hunter (1975) - Dollar
- Il sogno di Zorro (1975) - Sergeant Garcia
- Hitch-Hike (1977) - Mexican Way Station Clerk (final film role)
