= Two Sons of Ringo =

- Directed by: Giorgio Simonelli; Giuliano Carnimeo
- Written by: Dino Verde; Marcello Ciorciolini; Roberto Gianviti; Amedeo Sollazzo
- Produced by: Leo Cevenini; Vittorio Martino
- Starring: Franco Franchi; Ciccio Ingrassia; Gloria Paul
- Cinematography: Tino Santoni
- Music by: Piero Umiliani
- Distributed by: Variety Distribution
- Release date: 1966
- Running time: 105 minutes
- Country: Italy
- Language: Italian

Two Sons of Ringo (Italian: I due figli di Ringo) is a 1966 Italian western-parody film starring the comic duo Franco and Ciccio. It was the last film directed by Giorgio Simonelli who, for health reasons, left the production just before the end of filming and was replaced by Giuliano Carnimeo.

== Plot ==
Franco and Ciccio leave Agrigento, in Sicily, to search of their fortune in the American West. In the land of cowboys and dueling weapons, they pretend to be skilled thieves and gunmen under the names Django and Gringo. When they meet a big shot, Franco and Ciccio are forced to live their roles and pretend to be the children of the great gunslinger Ringo.

== Cast ==
- Franco Franchi as Django
- Ciccio Ingrassia as Gringo
- Gloria Paul as Dorothy
- George Hilton as Joe
- Ignazio Spalla as Indio
- Mimmo Palmara as The Sheriff
- Umberto D'Orsi as Simpson
- Orchidea De Santis as Marisol
- Ivano Staccioli as Burt
- Fulvia Franco as Margaret
- Guido Lollobrigida as Fred
- Enzo Andronico as Notaio
- Nino Terzo as Jimmy il Guercio
