= The Grasshopper (1970 film) =

1970 film by Jerry Paris

- Directed by: Jerry Paris
- Written by: Jerry Belson; Garry Marshall
- Based on: novel "The Passing of Evil" by Mark McShane
- Produced by: Garry Marshall; Jerry Paris; Jerry Belson
- Starring: Jacqueline Bisset; Jim Brown; Joseph Cotten
- Cinematography: Sam Leavitt
- Edited by: Aaron Stell
- Music by: Billy Goldenberg
- Distributed by: National General Pictures
- Release date: May 27, 1970
- Running time: 98 minutes
- Country: United States
- Language: English
- Box office: $2 million (US/ Canada rentals)

The Grasshopper is a 1970 drama film starring Jacqueline Bisset, with Jim Brown and Joseph Cotten in featured roles. It was directed by former actor Jerry Paris, his fifth feature film.

== Plot ==
Christine Adams, a carefree 19-year-old from British Columbia, Canada, travels to Los Angeles to be with her fiance, who works there in a bank. When her car breaks down part way she hitches numerous rides, being detoured into Las Vegas by an L.A. comedian and shown the town.

Eventually she gets to Los Angeles. When the relationship with the fiance doesn't work out, she moves to Las Vegas.

She finds work as a showgirl and meets Tommy Marcott, an African-American former pro football player who works as a "celebrity greeter" at a casino. They fall in love and get married. Christine is raped and beaten by Roosevelt Dekker, a wealthy casino patron.

Tommy beats Dekker bloody in a golf course bunker and the pair flees as Dekker promises revenge.

In Los Angeles, Tommy rejects any job offer connected to his life as a pro athlete and the couple's relationship spirals down. Moments after accepting a job from an old teammate, Tommy is shot dead on a basketball court by Dekker’s legman.

After the funeral, Christine OD's on street drugs taken in her grief. She returns to Las Vegas and finds work as a V.I.P. "party girl". She meets and is persuaded by wealthy client Richard Morgan to return to Los Angeles as his mistress.

Christine is fond of Richard but she gets bored in her new life, drifting into a romantic involvement with Jay Rigney, whom she had previously known platonically. She convinces Jay that she can get enough money that they can buy a ranch together. However that plan is doomed when Richard asks Christine to marry him, wanting her to spend all her time with him.

Jay persuades Christine that the only way they can keep the dream of getting a ranch alive is if she becomes a prostitute and he works as her pimp. She ends her relationship with Richard and for a while things go as planned. However one night she returns to the apartment she shares with Jay to discover he has left her and taken all of their money.

Christine goes to the airport where Richard’s private plane is kept and, by promising “some fun” and sharing a marijuana joint, induces airfield employee Elroy, who she had previously flirted with, to take her up in a skywriting plane. Still sharing the joint, Christine, by then twenty-two, has Elroy write "FUCK IT" across the sky, to the amusement or consternation of those below. The police take away Christine and Elroy when they land.

== Cast ==
- Jacqueline Bisset as Christine Adams
- Jim Brown as Tommy Marcott
- Joseph Cotten as Richard Morgan
- Corbett Monica as Danny Raymond
- Christopher Stone as Jay Rigney
- Ramon Bieri as Roosevelt Dekker
- Ed Flanders as Jack Benton
- William Callaway as Elroy
- Roger Garrett as Buck Brown
- William Bassett as Aaron
- Marc Hannibal as Marion Walters
- Penny Marshall as Plaster Casters

== Production ==
Parts of the film were shot in Heber, Utah.

Bisset later said there "were good bits" in the film. "It could have been interesting. The girl in that film was a female Alfie."

== Release ==
The film opened in Chicago and San Francisco in the week ended May 27, 1970.

=== Box office ===
The film grossed $46,000 in its opening week.

== Critical reception ==
Jim Craddock of VideoHound wrote in 2002 that "Bisset is a starstruck Canadian undone by the bright lights and big cities of America. By age 22, she's a burnt-out prostitute in Las Vegas. Cheerless but compelling".

Tom Lisanti and Louis Paul state in 2002 that "Bisset gave one of her finest performances, as a naïve woman who abandons her family for the glamour of Las Vegas". Shirley Halperin and Steve Bloom wrote in 2012 that Bisset is "at the peak of her hotness here, and for some that might be enough to make this pseudofeminist classic worth the watch", adding that she "exudes both naivete and badassness as her character".

== DVD ==
The Grasshopper was released March 23, 2009, on DVD by Warner Bros. via the Warner Archive DVD-on-demand service.

== See also ==
- List of American films of 1970
- List of films set in Las Vegas
