= Menage all'italiana =

1965 Italian comedy film directed by Franco Indovina

- Directed by: Franco Indovina
- Produced by: Dino De Laurentiis
- Starring: Ugo Tognazzi; Maria Grazia Buccella; Dalida; Romina Power; Anna Moffo
- Cinematography: Otello Martelli
- Music by: Ennio Morricone
- Release date: 13 October 1965
- Country: Italy
- Language: Italian

Menage all'italiana, also known as Menage Italian Style, is a 1965 Italian comedy film directed by Franco Indovina. It follows the story of a bigamist who cannot resist getting married again and again. He has eight wives.

== Cast ==
- Ugo Tognazzi: Alfredo
- Anna Moffo: Giovanna
- Maria Grazia Buccella: Egle
- Dalida: Armida
- Romina Power: Stella
- Mavie Bardanzellu: Virginia
- Monica Silwes: Ulla
- Susanna Clemm: Erika
- Rosalia Maggio: mother of Stella
- Paola Borboni
- Dino
