= Antonella Interlenghi =

Italian actress (born 1961)

- Born: 6 August 1961 (age 64); Rome, Italy
- Other name: Antonellina Interlenghi
- Occupation: Actress
- Height: 1.68 m (5 ft 6 in)

Antonella Interlenghi (born 6 August 1961) is an Italian stage, film and television actress. She is also known as Antonellina Interlenghi.

== Life and career ==
Born in Rome, Interlenghi is the daughter of the actors Antonella Lualdi and Franco Interlenghi.

She made her acting debut (credited as Phoenix Grant) in the 1977 Gianfranco Parolini adventure film Yeti: Giant of the 20th Century. In the 1980s she appeared in a number of films, mainly comedy and adventure films. She is also active on stage, where she notably worked with Giorgio Strehler, and on television.

=== Personal life ===
At 15 years old, Interlenghi married the nobleman Giovanni Sanjust di Teulada. The couple had two daughters and divorced two years after the marriage.

== Selected filmography ==
- Yeti: Giant of the 20th Century (1977, credited as Phoenix Grant)
- City of the Living Dead (1981)
- Un centesimo di secondo (1981)
- Vacanze di Natale (1983)
- Vacanze in America (1984)
- La Cage aux Folles 3: The Wedding (1985)
- Sottozero (1987)
- Mother (1990)
- Ho sposato un calciatore (2005)
