= Texas Ranger (film) =

- Italian: I due violenti
- Directed by: Primo Zeglio
- Written by: Marcello Fondato; Manuel Sebares
- Screenplay by: Federico De Urrutia; Jesús María Navarro Carrión
- Story by: Jesús María Navarro Carrión
- Produced by: Alberto Grimaldi
- Cinematography: Alfredo Fraile
- Edited by: Enzo Alabiso
- Music by: Francesco De Masi
- Production companies: Arturo González Producciones Cinematográficas; Produzioni Europee Associate
- Distributed by: Shaw Brothers; Exclusivas Floralva Distribución S.A.; Warner Bros. Television
- Release date: 8 August 1964 (Italy)
- Running time: 94 min

Texas Ranger (Italian: I due violenti) is a 1964 Italian western film directed by Primo Zeglio and scored by Francesco De Masi.

== Cast ==
- Alan Scott as Cassidy
- George Martin as Sgt. Bob Logan
- Susy Andersen as Mary Sheridan
- Mary A. Badmayev as Ann Kenny
- Silvia Solar as Linda Ranson
- José Nieto as Ranger Mayor
- Mike Brendel as Amos
- Andrea Scotti as Barnes Gang member
- José Jaspe as Mortimer
- Francisco Braña as Perkins
- Luis Induni as Barnes
- Aldo Sambrell as Carson
- Antonio Molino Rojo as Perkins
- John Bever Hill as Pat Sheridan
- Pauline Baards as Betty McGregor
- Cris Huerta as Buck
- Juan Antonio Peral as Dan
- Julio Pimentel as Hombre de Barnes
- Fernando Sánchez Polack as Hombre de Barnes
- Agustín Bescos as Ciudadano
- Alfonso de la Vega as Hombre de Barnes
- Ignacio de Paúl as Amos Ranson
- Francisco Diaz Puente as Barman
- Antonio Gandía as Kirby
- Ángel Menéndez as Sheriff
- Jorge Ochando as Jim, Pat's Friend
- Joaquín Parra as Hombre de Barnes
- Hugo Pimentel as Commissioner
- Luis Villar as Judge
