= Adiós, Sabata =

1970 film directed by Gianfranco Parolini

- Italian film poster
- Directed by: Gianfranco Parolini
- Screenplay by: Renato Izzo; Gianfranco Parolini
- Story by: Renato Izzo; Gianfranco Parolini
- Produced by: Alberto Grimaldi
- Starring: Yul Brynner; Dean Reed; Ignazio Spalla; Sal Borgese; Gérard Herter; Franco Fantasia; Turam Quibo; Susan Scott; Gianni Rizzo
- Cinematography: Sandro Mancori
- Edited by: Gianfranco Parolini
- Music by: Bruno Nicolai
- Production company: Produzioni Europee Associati
- Distributed by: Produzioni Europee Associati (Italy)
- Release date: 30 September 1970 (Italy)
- Country: Italy

Adiós, Sabata (Italian: Indio Black, sai che ti dico: Sei un gran figlio di..., lit. "Indio Black, you know what I'm going to tell you... You're a big son of a...") is a 1970 Italian Spaghetti Western film, directed by Gianfranco Parolini. It is the second film in The Sabata Trilogy by Parolini. Yul Brynner takes over the lead role from Lee Van Cleef, who stars in the first and third films.

== Plot ==
Set in Mexico under the rule of Emperor Maximilian I, Sabata is hired by the guerrilla leader Señor Ocaño to steal a wagonload of gold from the Austrian army. However, when Sabata and his partners, Escudo and Ballantine, obtain the wagon, they find it is not full of gold but of sand, and that the gold was taken by Austrian Colonel Skimmel. So, Sabata plans to steal back the gold.

== Cast ==
- Yul Brynner as Sabata / Indio Black
- Dean Reed as Ballantine
- Ignazio Spalla as Escudo
- Gérard Herter as Colonel Skimmel
- Sal Borgese as Septiembre
- Franco Fantasia as Señor Ocaño
- Turam Quibo (credited as Joseph P. Persaud) as Gitano
- Andrea Scotti as José
- Nieves Navarro (credited as Susan Scott) as Saloon Dancer
- Gianni Rizzo as Folgen
- Salvatore Billa as Manuel
- Massimo Carocci as Juan de los Ángeles
- Omar Bonaro as Jesus
- Luciano Casamonica as Juanito
- Vittorio Fanfoni as Barman
- Bruno Corazzari as Hertz

== Release ==
Adiós, Sabata was first released in 1970.

== Reception ==
Tom Milne of the Monthly Film Bulletin reviewed a dubbed version of the film in 1973. Milne found that "the rather routine proceedings are enlivened from time to time by ingeniously macabre details like the model ship firing from all guns with which Skimmel executes informers, or the "flamenco of death" (spurs glittering ominously on drumming heels) with which Gitano announced the end of enemies of the revolution." Milne commented on "it is a pity that so much of the action is clogged up by that old stand-by of the Italian Western-extras falling off roofs in graceful death-falls. This time the supply of cannon-fodder destined for identical deaths is apparently inexhaustible."

== See also ==
- List of Italian films of 1970
