= Beatrice Cenci (1969 film) =

The Conspiracy of Torture
- Italian film poster
- Directed by: Lucio Fulci
- Screenplay by: Lucio Fulci; Roberto Gianviti
- Produced by: Giorgio Agliani
- Starring: Tomas Milian; Adrienne La Russa; Georges Wilson; Antonio Casagrande; Mavi; Pedro Sanchez; Raymond Pellegrin
- Cinematography: Erico Menczer
- Edited by: Antonietta Zita
- Music by: Angelo Francesco Lavagnino; Silvano Spadaccino
- Production company: Filmena
- Distributed by: Consorzio Italiano Distributori Indipendenti Film
- Release date: 14 November 1969 (Italy)
- Running time: 99 minutes
- Country: Italy
- Language: Italian

The Conspiracy of Torture (Italian: Beatrice Cenci) is a 1969 Italian historical drama film directed by Lucio Fulci, starring Adrienne La Russa and Tomas Milian. The shooting title was originally La vera storia di Beatrice Cenci. It depicts the real life events of Francesco Cenci and his daughter Beatrice, emphasizing the more horrific elements of the story.

== Plot ==
In the year 1599 in Italy, the entire Cenci family awaits their fates on the morning of their execution for murder. The events leading up to this day are presented in a series of overlapping flashbacks.

Four years earlier, Francesco Cenci is a rich landowner and nobleman, but is hated by everyone, including his entire family. He's a vicious, conniving, cynical tyrant of the household and a domestic abuser to his wife and children. He also has made numerous enemies within the close-knit halls of the Catholic Church and the state. Francesco's beautiful teenage daughter, Beatrice, confides in her mother that she intends to take the cloth and enter a convent, as much to escape from her abusive father as for spiritual reasons. When Francesco hears about this, he is enraged and reacts by imprisoning Beatrice in the basement of the Cenci castle, observing that there is little difference between dungeon and cloister.

In the present day, it is announced that the Cenci patriarch has been killed in a fall from the battlements, an accident which looks suspiciously like murder. Suspicion closes around Beatrice's lover Olimpio, who is taken into custody and brutally tortured for information about the mysterious death.

In another flashback, Beatrice is released from her father's dungeon after nearly one year in solitary confinement by Francesco to celebrate news that her two older brothers died of smallpox. Beatrice defies the atmosphere demanded by her abrasive and callous father when she attends the party wearing a black funeral dress. A little later that night, Francisco confronts Beatrice in an upstairs bedroom, drunkenly rips off his daughter's black dress and stands swaying over her before he rapes her.

Beatrice changes drastically after this experience; she coerces her besotted servant, Olimpio, with sexual favors, and embroils him in her desire for revenge. Olimpio is told to seek the assistance of the local bandit, Catalano, to exact revenge on her father. Olimpio is not told for what reason he is planning the murder; it is enough for him that his lady lover requires it. When the time comes as Francesco Cenci sleeps, Catalano backs out, revealing that he is a killer "in reputation only." Olimpio, with a knife raised to stab Francesco, also suddenly backs out saying that he cannot stomach the task of killing another human being. In desperation, Beatrice snatches the knife away from Olimpio and does the deed herself, stabbing her father in the eye, while Olimpio restrains the waking victim before he expires.

Beatrice is vengefully jubilant, but Olimpio is stricken with guilt, and wipes his bloody hands on the bedstead. Beatrice calls in her stepmother to help her clean up the mess and gets her little brother to help her carry the dead Francesco onto the ramparts of the castle to throw him off to make it look like an accident. Beatrice uses their silent compliance to ensure future denials.

In the present day, the whole Cenci family is implicated in the murder either as participants or accessories and under Catholic Church law, they are condemned to death. The bandit Catalano is murdered by soldiers when he attempts to escape. The prosecutor in the case, Cardinal Lanciani, attempts to write a statement implicating Beatrice to Olimpio, who has been repeatedly tortured to extract a confession about the Cenci family's involvement. But Olimpio maintains Beatrice's innocence in the crime until he dies from his wounds. The planned execution begins causing great unrest among the people of Rome who feel that Beatrice was justified in killing her father who besmirched her honor. On a court appeal by the Cenci family lawyer, the Pope decides to absolve Beatrice Cenci of all her sins but only after she is beheaded along with the rest of her family. He believes that an absolution will clear the air by making Beatrice a martyr. The film ends as Beatrice and the rest of her family are led out of their cells into the local courtyard for their execution (which is carried out off-camera).

== Cast ==
- Adrienne La Russa as Beatrice Cenci
- Tomas Milian as Olimpio Calvetti
- Georges Wilson as Francesco Cenci, Beatrice's Father
- Mavi as Lucrezia Petroni, Beatrice's Stepmother
- Antonio Casagrande as Don Giacomo Cenci
- Pedro Sanchez as Catalano
- Max Steffen Zacharias as Prospero Farinacci
- Raymond Pellegrin as Cardinal Lanciani
- Massimo Sarchielli as Gasparro
- John Bartha as First Excellency
- Giorgio Jerzy Rayzacher as Second Excellency
- Mirko Ellis as Third Excellency
- Umberto D'Orsi as Inspector
- Giuseppe Fortis as The Chaplain
- Stefano Oppedisano as Inspector's Assistant
- Giancarlo Badessi as Bargello (uncredited)
- Ernesto Colli as Chief Guard (uncredited)
- Amedeo Trilli as Servant (uncredited)

== Release ==
The film was released as Beatrice Cenci in Italy on November 14, 1969. The English-dubbed version, called Conspiracy of Torture, was released in the United States in September 1976.

== Reception ==
Fulci and his wife Maria considered Beatrice Cenci as one of his favorite films.
