= Yanti Somer =

Finnish actress (born 1948)

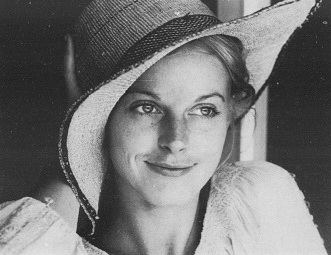
- Born: 29 February 1948 (age 78); Helsinki, Finland
- Occupation: Actress
- Years active: 1970-present

Yanti Somer (born Kirsti Elisa Somersalo, 29 February 1948) is a Finnish actress. She has appeared in more than fifteen films since 1970, predominantly in French and Italian productions.

== Selected filmography ==
Year	Title	Role	Notes
1982	Monsignor	2nd Flaherty Secretary	
1979	Star Odyssey	Irene	
1978	War of the Robots	Julie	
1978	Battle of the Stars	Diane Greene	
1977	Cosmos: War of the Planets	Meela	
1976	Merciless Man	Mayer's henchwoman	
1976	Evil Thoughts	Paola	
1972	Avanti!	Nurse	
1972	Man of the East	Candida Olsen	
1971	Trinity Is Still My Name	Trinity's girl, the farmer's daughter	
