= Alberto Grimaldi =

Italian film producer (1925–2021)

- Born: 28 March 1925; Naples, Kingdom of Italy
- Died: 23 January 2021 (aged 95); Miami, Florida, U.S.
- Occupation: Film producer

Alberto Grimaldi (28 March 1925 – 23 January 2021) was an Italian film producer.

== Life and career ==
Grimaldi was born in Naples and studied law. In 1962 he founded his own production company, P.E.A., and released his first feature film, The Shadow of Zorro the following year and his first Spaghetti Western I due violenti (1964). His producing credits include For a Few Dollars More in 1965, The Good, the Bad and the Ugly in 1966 both with Sergio Leone who initially sought his legal experience advice, Last Tango in Paris in 1972, and Gangs of New York in 2002.

Grimaldi died in Miami on 23 January 2021, at the age of 95. He was survived by his children, Massimo, Maurizio, and Marcello, as well as three grandchildren.

== Selected filmography ==
- The Shadow of Zorro (L'ombra di Zorro, 1962)
- I due violenti (1964)
- For a Few Dollars More (Per qualche dollaro in più, 1965)
- Legacy of the Incas (Das Vermächtnis des Inka, 1965)
- Dollars for a Fast Gun (La muerte cumple condena, 1966)
- Requiem for a Secret Agent (Requiem per un agente segreto, 1966)
- Viva gringo (1966)
- The Big Gundown (La resa dei conti, 1966)
- The Good, the Bad and the Ugly (l buono, il brutto, il cattivo, 1966)
- Listen, Let's Make Love (Scusi, facciamo l'amore? 1967)
- Desert Commandos (Attentato ai tre grandi, 1967)
- Face to Face (Faccia a faccia, 1967)
- The Mercenary (Il mercenario, 1968)
- Spirits of the Dead (Histoires extraordinaires, 1968)
- Burn! (Queimada, 1969)
- The Devil by the Tail (Le diable par la queue, 1969)
- Sabata (Ehi amico... c'è Sabata, hai chiuso!, 1969)
- Rebus (1969)
- A Quiet Place in the Country (Un tranquillo posto di campagna, 1969)
- Fellini Satyricon (Satyricon, 1969)
- Oceano (1971)
- Adiós, Sabata (Indio Black, sai che ti dico: Sei un gran figlio di..., 1971)
- The Decameron (Il Decameron, 1971)
- Return of Sabata (È tornato Sabata... hai chiuso un'altra volta, 1971)
- Africa ama (1971)
- Trastevere (1971)
- The Canterbury Tales (I Racconti di Canterbury, 1972)
- Man of the East (E poi lo chiamarono il magnifico, 1972)
- Last Tango in Paris (Ultimo tango a Parigi, 1972)
- Man of La Mancha (1972)
- They Believed He Was No Saint (La caza del oro, 1972)
- Bawdy Tales (Storie scellerate, 1973)
- Arabian Nights (Il fiore delle mille e una notte, 1974)
- ll mio nome è Scopone e faccio sempre cappotto (1975)
- Salò, or the 120 Days of Sodom (Salò o le 120 giornate di Sodoma, 1976)
- Illustrious Corpses (Cadaveri eccellenti, 1976)
- 1900 (Novecento, 1976)
- Fellini's Casanova (Il Casanova di Federico Fellini, 1976)
- Lovers and Liars (Viaggio con Anita, 1979)
- Corse a perdicuore (1980)
- Ginger and Fred (Ginger e Fred, 1986)
- Gangs of New York (2002)
