= Dolenice =

- Municipality
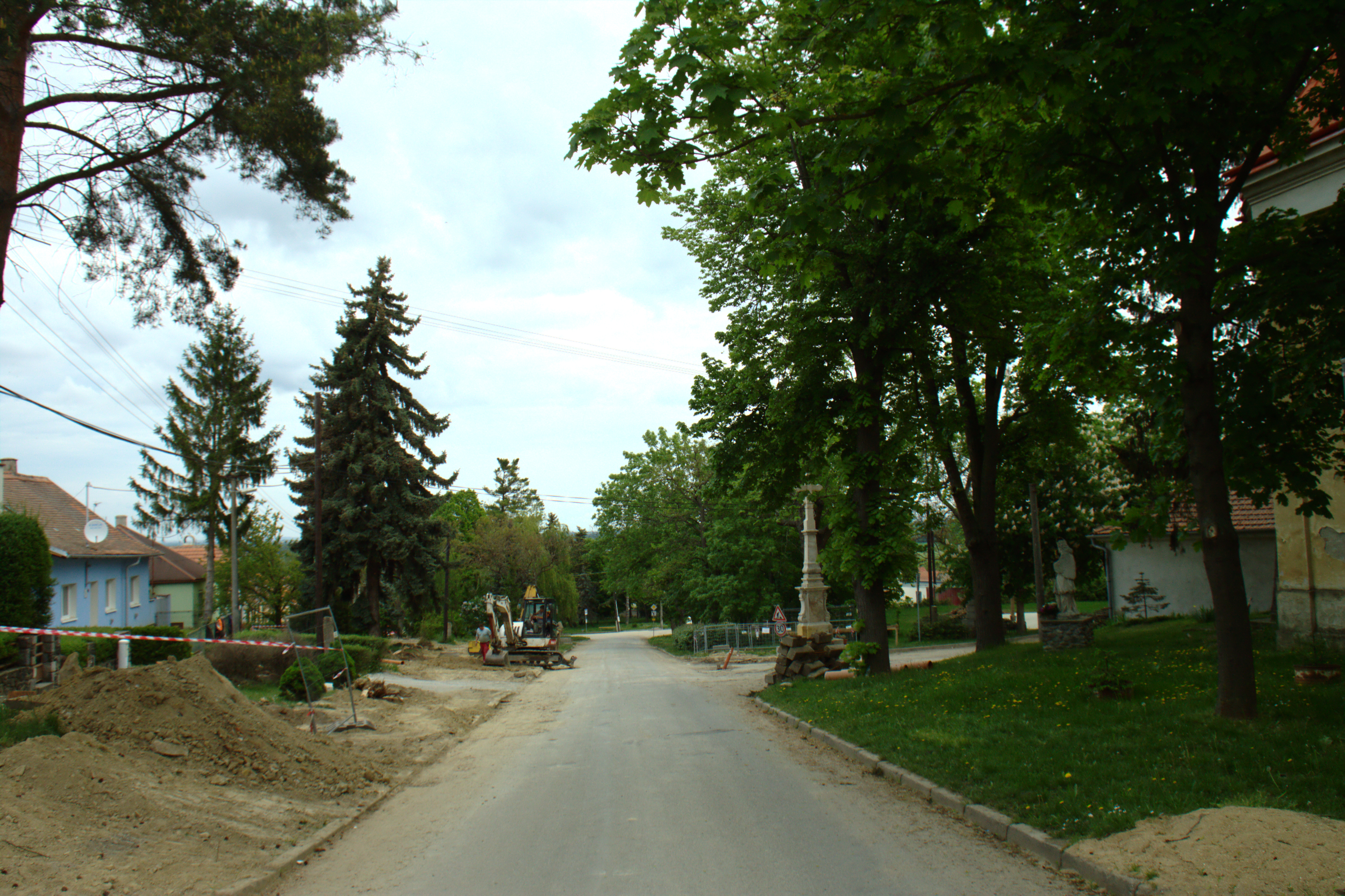
- Main street

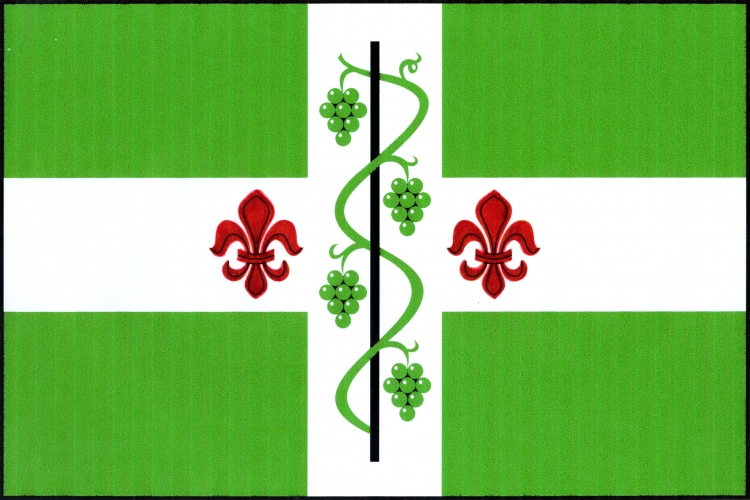
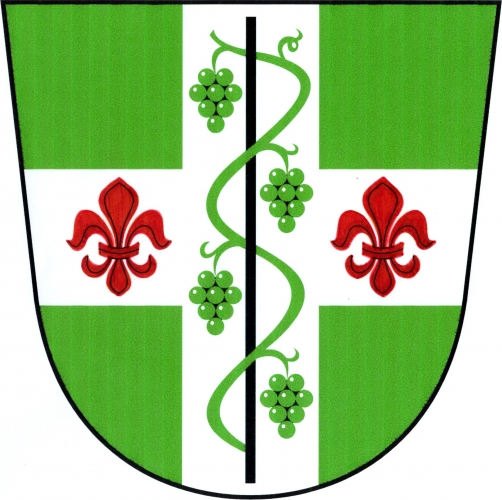
- Flag Coat of arms

- Location in the Czech Republic
- Coordinates: 48°54′33″N 16°21′56″E
- Country: Czech Republic
- Region: South Moravian
- District: Znojmo
- First mentioned: 1046

Area
  - Total: 4.47 km^{2} (1.73 sq mi)
- Elevation: 227 m (745 ft)

Population (2026-01-01)
  - Total: 137
  - Density: 30.6/km^{2} (79.4/sq mi)
- Time zone: UTC+1 (CET)
  - Summer (DST): UTC+2 (CEST)
- Postal code: 671 78
- Website: www.obecdolenice.cz

Dolenice (German: Tullnitz) is a municipality and village in Znojmo District in the South Moravian Region of the Czech Republic. It has about 100 inhabitants.

== Geography ==
Dolenice is located about 23 kilometres (14 mi) east of Znojmo and 35 km (22 mi) south of Brno. It lies in a flat landscape in the Dyje–Svratka Valley.

== History ==
The first written mention of Dolenice is from 1046.

== Demographics ==
Historical population

Year	Pop.	±%
1869	378	—
1880	458	+21.2%
1890	364	−20.5%
1900	360	−1.1%
1910	393	+9.2%

Year	Pop.	±%
1921	440	+12.0%
1930	388	−11.8%
1950	257	−33.8%
1961	259	+0.8%
1970	242	−6.6%

Year	Pop.	±%
1980	214	−11.6%
1991	155	−27.6%
2001	157	+1.3%
2011	148	−5.7%
2021	138	−6.8%

Source: Censuses

== Transport ==
Dolenice is located on the railway line Brno–Hrušovany nad Jevišovkou/Šanov.

== Sights ==
The most valuable monument is the Chapel of the Exaltation of the Holy Cross. This octagonal Baroque building dates from the end of the 17th century.
