= Marcello Giombini =

Italian composer (1928–2003)

- Born: 24 July 1928; Rome, Italy
- Died: 12 December 2003 (aged 75) Assisi, Italy
- Genres: Film scores
- Occupation: Composer

Marcello Giombini (24 July 1928 in Rome, Italy – 12 December 2003 in Assisi, Italy) was an Italian composer, well known for scoring many Spaghetti Westerns, Italian horror and giallo movies, and 1960s peplum films. He is best remembered for his score to the original Sabata (1969), which starred Lee Van Cleef.

His son Pierluigi Giombini is also an accomplished musician and composer.

Additional biographical information, compositions, filmography, and discography may be found (in Italian) at Marcello Giombini.

== Music ==
=== Selected filmography ===
- Vulcan, Son of Giove (1962)
- March on Rome (1962)
- I sette gladiatori (1962)
- The Seven Tasks of Ali Baba (1962)
- The Magnificent Gladiator (1964)
- James Tont operazione U.N.O. (1965)
- Our Man in Jamaica (1965)
- The Relentless Four (1965)
- For a Few Dollars Less (1966)
- Death Walks in Laredo (1966)
- Ballad of a Gunman (1967)
- Mission Stardust (1967)
- Dead Men Don't Count (1968)
- Garringo (1969)
- Battle of the Commandos (1969)
- Sabata (1969)
- Sartana Kills Them All (1970)
- Return of Sabata (1971)
- Holy Water Joe (1971)
- Un gioco per Eveline (1971)
- Knife of Ice (1972)
- They Believed He Was No Saint (1972)
- The Flower with the Petals of Steel (1973)
- The Killer Wore Gloves (1974)
- The Eerie Midnight Horror Show (1974)
- Miracles Still Happen (1974)
- The Bloodsucker Leads the Dance (1975)
- Cosmos: War of the Planets (1978)
- War of the Robots (1978)
- Star Odyssey (1978)
- Eyes Behind the Stars (1978)
- Terror Express (1979)
- Escape from Hell (1980)
- The Beast in Space (1980)
- Antropophagus (1980)
- Erotic Nights of the Living Dead (1980)
- Panic (1982)

=== Other ===
- Le tue mani
