= Gianni Rizzo =

Italian actor (1925–1992)

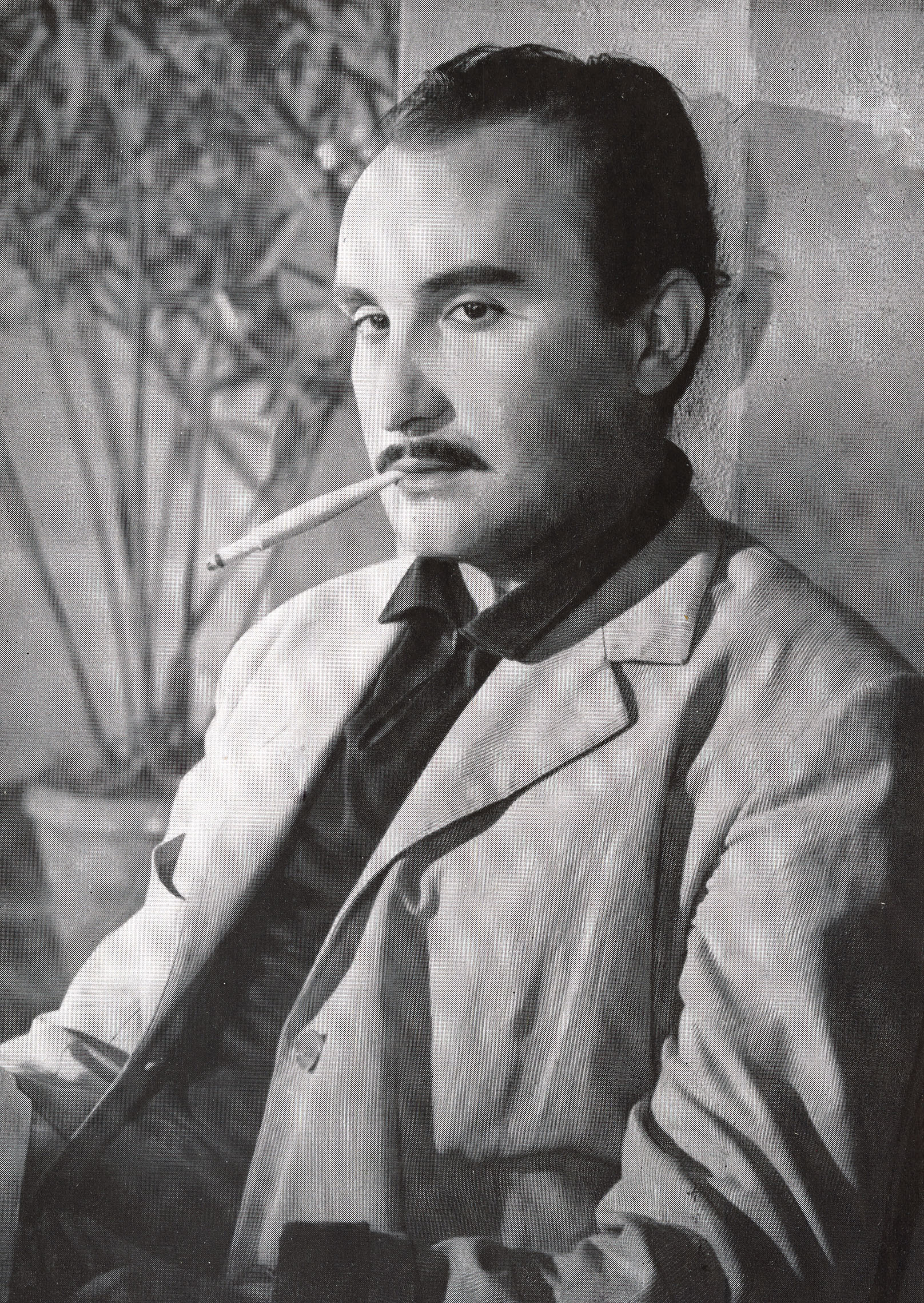
- Rizzo in 1954
- Born: 5 April 1925; Brindisi, Apulia; Italy
- Died: 4 February 1992 (aged 66); Rome, Lazio; Italy
- Occupation: Actor
- Years active: 1944–1986 (film)

Gianni Rizzo (5 April 1925 – 4 February 1992) was an Italian film actor. Between 1944 and 1986, he appeared in over seventy films and television productions, in a variety of supporting roles.

His screen roles included parts in a number of peplum films, such as The Vengeance of Ursus (1961). He also appeared in Italian spy films, spaghetti westerns, and played the villain in the 1967 Perry Rhodan movie, Mission Stardust.

He died in 1992 at age 66.

== Selected filmography ==
- Macario contro Zagomar (1949)
- City of Pain (1949) - Sergio
- A Night of Fame (1949) - Max
- Totò Le Mokò (1949) - Cicerone, Casbah tourguide (uncredited)
- The Crossroads (1951) - Beppe detto il Curato
- Three Steps North (1951) - The Greek
- Wolves Hunt at Night (1952) - Le commissaire italien
- A Mother Returns (1952) - Ex-amante di Elena
- Una croce senza nome (1952)
- Serenata amara (1952) - Peppe
- The Phantom Musketeer (1952) - Pierre de La Tour
- I Chose Love (1953)
- Puccini (1953)
- Carmen proibita (1953)
- Tripoli, Beautiful Land of Love (1954) - Rudi
- Disowned (1954)
- Pirate of the Half Moon (1957) - Visconte di Grand
- Orizzonte infuocato (1957) - Vasco
- Head of a Tyrant (1959) - Ozia
- Avventura a Capri (1959) - Antonio il parrucchiere
- Le secret du Chevalier d'Éon (1959) - (uncredited)
- The Pirate and the Slave Girl (1959) - Nikopoulos
- La notte del grande assalto (1959) - The Maltese
- Agosto, donne mie non vi conosco (1959) - Proprietario del night-club
- Cavalcata selvaggia (1960)
- Gli scontenti (1961)
- The Vengeance of Ursus (1961) - Licurgo
- Zorro in the Court of Spain (1962) - Don Carlos
- Those Two in the Legion (1962) - Suprut
- Lo smemorato di Collegno (1962) - Ragionere
- Zorro and the Three Musketeers (1963) - King Philip
- Slave Queen of Babylon (1963) - Ghelas
- The Ten Gladiators (1963) - Claudius Nero
- Sword in the Shadows (1963) - Giorgio
- Mission to Hell (1964) - John Yakiris
- Triumph of the Ten Gladiators (1964) - Sesto Vitorio
- 3 Avengers (1964) - Teomoco
- Spartacus and the Ten Gladiators (1964) - Senator Giulio Varro
- Le bambole (1965) - Hotel Manager
- Desperate Mission (1965) - Barrow
- I soldi (1965)
- Me, Me, Me... and the Others (1966) - Politician with glasses
- Man on the Spying Trapeze (1966)- Stephanolopoulus
- Vacanze sulla neve (1966)
- Requiem for a Secret Agent (1966) - Atenopoulos
- Lotus Flowers for Miss Quon (1967) - Blackie Lee
- Mission Stardust (1967) - Car Seller
- Desert Commandos (1967) - Perrier
- Face to Face (1967) - Williams
- If You Meet Sartana Pray for Your Death (1968) - Alman
- Run, Man, Run (1968) - Mayor Christopher Bannington
- Sabata (1969) - Judge O'Hara
- Adiós, Sabata (1970) - Folgen
- Lady Caliph (1970) - Un industriale
- Between Miracles (1971) - Priest
- The Decameron (1971) - Father Superior
- Return of Sabata (1971) - Jeremy Sweeney
- Alfredo, Alfredo (1972) - A Judge
- Bawdy Tales (1973) - Il cardinale
- Questa volta ti faccio ricco! (1974) - Giorgiakis
- Anno uno (1974) - Dirigente DC torinese
- Who Breaks... Pays (1975) - Mister Paul
- Beach House (1977) - L'allenatore
- The Uranium Conspiracy (1978) - The Captain
- The Lonely Lady (1983) - Gino Paoluzzi
- Everybody in Jail (1984) - Minister Euclide
- The Name of the Rose (1986) - Päpstliche Gesandte #5 (final film role)

== Bibliography ==
- Hughes, Howard. Cinema Italiano: The Complete Guide from Classics to Cult. I.B.Tauris, 2011.
