= Marc Hannibal =

American singer

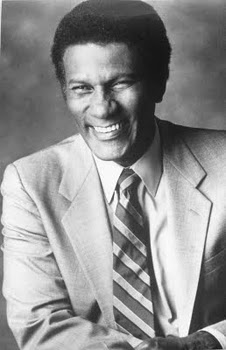
- Born: Frank Charles Hannibal Jr. March 21, 1931; St. Louis, Missouri, U.S.
- Died: July 23, 2011 (aged 80); Salem, Oregon, U.S.
- Education: Benson Polytechnic High School

Frank Charles Hannibal Jr. (March 21, 1931 – July 23, 2011), better known as Marc Hannibal, was an actor, singer and sportsman, perhaps best known for his tenure with the Harlem Globetrotters from 1954 to 1956.

== Basketball career ==
He studied at Benson Polytechnic High School in Portland, Oregon, where he was a star basketball player. After serving briefly in the U.S. Army, he was recruited in 1954 to the Harlem Globetrotters where he played for two years and toured with the team. In 1956 he played with the Harlem Magicians.

== Acting career ==
Hannibal's TV acting debut was in 1963 on "CBS Repertoire Workshop", where he narrated the story of the historical Dred Scott Supreme Court case. He starred in several variety shows, including "Hannibal's Trunk". He had guest appearances in a number of television series including Dragnet 1967, Marcus Welby, M.D., Columbo, a number of Adam-12 episodes and in Mission Impossible, McCloud, Kojak and others. He produced and starred in the Las Vegas variety show On the Strip. Hannibal also appeared in feature films such as Airport and starred as a gladiator superhero in the 1974 film Super Stooges vs. the Wonder Women.

== Singing career ==
As a child, Hannibal was featured on the "Stars of Tomorrow" show in Portland. He sang throughout the 1960s and early 1970s in various Portland venues including the Jazz Quarry and the Prima Donna. He recorded two albums: the first, self-titled Marc Hannibal for Philips label, the second entitled Night Times for First American independent label. His music was chronicled in the Carolan Gladden book entitled The First Book of Oregon Jazz, Rock and All Sorts of Music.

== In popular culture ==
- In 2002, Marc Hannibal's song "Forever Is a Long, Long Time" taken from his debut album Marc Hannibal, was sampled by Royce da 5'9" for the latter's song "Boom" that appeared on the album Rock City
- The song was also used on the soundtrack of MTV's 2001 television film Hip Hopera: Carmen.

== Discography ==
- Marc Hannibal (on Philips label)
- Night Times (on First American label)

== Filmography ==
Year	Title	Role	Notes
1970	Airport	Sgt. Edward Washington – Passenger	Uncredited
1970	The Man from O.R.G.Y.		
1970	The Grasshopper	Marion Walters	
1970	Fools	Dog owner	
1974	Super Stooges vs. the Wonder Women	Moog – African Superhero	(credited as Mark Hannibal)
1977	Joey		
