= Supermen Against the Orient =

1973 Italian-Hong Kong film by Bitto Albertini

- Film poster
- Directed by: Bitto Albertini; Kuei Chi-hung
- Screenplay by: Gino Capone; Bitto Albertini
- Story by: Bitto Albertini
- Starring: Robert Malcolm; Antonio Cantafora; Sal Borgese; Lo Lieh; Shih Szu
- Cinematography: Pier Luigi Santi
- Edited by: Fausto Ulisse
- Music by: Nico Fidenco
- Production companies: I.N.D.I.E.F.; Shaw Brothers
- Release date: 1973 (Italy)
- Running time: 102 minutes
- Countries: Italy; Hong Kong

Supermen Against the Orient (Italian: Crash! Che botte... Strippo strappo stroppio) is a 1973 superhero film directed by Bitto Albertini. An Italian-Hong Kong co-production, it is a sequel of Gianfranco Parolini's 1967 film The Three Fantastic Supermen.

It was a commercial success in Italy and also in Hong Kong.

== Plot ==
FBI agent Robert Wallace has orders to find six Americans who have gone missing in Bangkok. The trace leads to Hong Kong. During his investigation Wallace makes new friends, who stand by his side when he is attacked by members of a criminal gang.

== Cast ==
- Robert Malcolm as Robert Wallace
- Antonio Cantafora as Max
- Salvatore Borgese as Jerry
- Lo Lieh as Master Tang
- Shih Szu as mysterious young lady
- Tung Lin as Chen-Loh
- Alberto Farnese as Colonel Roger
- Jacques Dufilho as American ambassador
- Isabella Biagini as the ambassador's wife

== Production ==
Supermen Against the Orient was an Italian and Hong Kong co-production. After the death of Bruce Lee, the market for Hong Kong film productions became more restricted. Censorship in Singapore and a quota system for local films in Thailand meant that there was a smaller demand for products from large Hong Kong studios like Shaw Brothers and Golden Harvest. This led to both companies seeking respite in overseas productions such as the hybrids between the British Hammer Films (The Legend of the 7 Golden Vampires), Rapid Films with their German co-production Enter the Seven Virgins (1974) and Italy's I.N.D.I.E.F. for Supermen Against the Orient.

The film differs from other entries in the Three Supermen series as Italo Martinenghi's company Cinesecolo had nothing to do with the production.

Jackie Chan is credited among the choreographers in the film.

== Release ==
Supermen Against the Orient was released in Italy in 1973.

== Reception ==
Kevin Lyons from The EOFFTV Review stated the film presented "lots of very silly" moments and an "embarrassing collection of worn-out gags". However, he considered it amusing for slapstick fans. Andrew Pragasam from The Spinning Image described the film as a "lively, if meandering romp" with a "memorably silly theme song".
