= Sabata (film) =

1969 film by Gianfranco Parolini

- Italian film poster.
- Directed by: Gianfranco Parolini
- Screenplay by: Renato Izzo; Gianfranco Parolini
- Story by: Renato Izzo; Gianfranco Parolini
- Produced by: Alberto Grimaldi
- Starring: Lee Van Cleef; William Berger; Ignazio Spalla; Aldo Canti; Linda Veras; Franco Ressel; Antonio Gradoli; Claudio Undari; Gianni Rizzo
- Cinematography: Alessando Mancori
- Edited by: Edmondo Lozzi
- Music by: Marcello Giombini
- Production company: Produzioni Europee Associati
- Distributed by: Produzioni Europee Associati (Italy); United Artists (International)
- Release date: September 1969 (Italy)
- Country: Italy

Sabata (Italian: Ehi amico... c'è Sabata. Hai chiuso!, lit. "Hey man ... that's Sabata. You're finished!"), is a 1969 Italian Spaghetti Western directed by Gianfranco Parolini. It is the first film in The Sabata Trilogy by Parolini, and stars Lee Van Cleef as the title character. Parolini had previously had a major success with the first Sartana Spaghetti Western If You Meet Sartana Pray for Your Death (1968), but the sequels were given to Giuliano Carnimeo. Producer Alberto Grimaldi contacted Parolini for a similar series of Sabata.

== Synopsis ==
In Daugherty, Texas, a group of thieves disguised as Army soldiers steal a safe with $100,000 of the Army's money in it by having a pair of acrobats vault up to the second floor entrance. They haul the vault away in a wagon. During the robbery, Sabata befriends Carrincha, a Confederate veteran. Sabata chases the thieves and shoots them all down from long range. He returns the safe and accepts a $5,000 reward from the Army. On the way back in to town, he notices the acrobats' circus wagon. While relaxing in the hotel, he meets Banjo, a mysterious bard who claims to know him.

In a private room, Stengel, Judge O'Hara and Ferguson lament the return of the safe. They conceived the theft to use the money to purchase land that would soon be wanted for railroad development, vastly increasing its value. Stengel commissions a man named Oswald to kill the acrobats and dispose of their wagon - the only evidence of their involvement. Though Oswald kills the acrobats, Sabata stops them from taking the wagon, and confirms Stengel's involvement by identifying one of the men sent to destroy the wagon. Sabata goes to Stengel's ranch to negotiate, and demands $10,000 to turn over the wagon. He rides into the ranch and Stengel's men open fire; a dummy was propped up in the wagon. For this betrayal, Sabata demands $20,000 and rides off.

Banjo confronts Sabata and tells him that the conspirators will never pay him, because they believe he will keep increasing the bounty no matter what. Immediately thereafter, Stengel's men ambush Sabata, but he kills or subdues them and agrees to meet with Stengel. At dinner, he raises the price to $30,000. Ferguson hires a series of hitmen to kill Sabata, all of whom are unsuccessful. Sabata then raises the price to $60,000 and agrees to accept delivery the next day at Los Palos. A group of men from Banjo's past try to kill him, but he dispatches them with expert skill using a rifle concealed in his instrument. Sabata then enlists his help as protection for the delivery in exchange for the Army's $5,000 reward, which he shows him.

At Los Palos, Banjo double-crosses Sabata and shoots him. Sabata shields himself with the bag of money, which was full of sand underneath the $5,000. He shoots away Banjo's weapon but lets him leave, unharmed. Ferguson, who witnessed the exchange, sends men to chase Sabata. With the help of Charrincha's Indian acrobat friend, they trick the men into entering a canyon and trap them there with dynamite. Sabata, Indio and Carrincha then plant dynamite throughout Stengel's ranch at night, culminating in a large-scale attack and showdown in which Sabata kills Stengel.

The next day, however, Sabata and Banjo duel, and Banjo seemingly kills Sabata. Carrincha loads his body into Banjo's wagon and they ride off. Outside of town, Banjo takes the money bag and unhitches his horse from the wagon. Sabata, only playing dead, shoots the money bag off of his horse and takes it back - their agreement was 50/50. For this final betrayal, Sabata offers Banjo only the original $5,000 bundle, which he then shoots, scattering it to the wind.

== Cast ==
- Lee Van Cleef as Sabata
- William Berger as Banjo
- Ignazio Spalla (as Pedro Sanchez) as Carrincha
- Aldo Canti (as Nick Jordan) as Indio/Alley Cat
- Linda Veras as Jane, a saloon girl and Banjo's lover.
- Franco Ressel as Stengel
- Antonio Gradoli (as Anthony Gradwell) as Ferguson
- Claudio Undari (as Robert Hundar) as Oswald
- Gianni Rizzo as Judge O'Hara

== Release ==
Sabata premiered in Italy in September 1969. It was released in the US almost a year after, in September 2, 1970.
