= Alfonso Brescia =

Italian film director (1930–2001)

- Born: 6 January 1930; Rome, Italy
- Died: 6 June 2001 (aged 71); Rome, Italy
- Other name: Al Bradley
- Occupations: Film director, screenwriter

Alfonso Brescia (6 January 1930 – 6 June 2001) was an Italian film director and screenwriter. He began working in film against his father's wishes, and eventually directed his first film Revolt of the Praetorians in 1964. Brescia worked in several genres in the Italian film industry, including five science fiction films he directed following the release of Star Wars. His work slowed down towards the late 1980s, and his last film Club Vacanze could not get distribution.

== Biography ==
Alfonso Brescia was born in Rome on 6 January 1930. He was the son of a film producer and entered the film business against his father's will. His father had him work as a production driver, which involved getting up early to persuade him against entering the business which did not work. He began work as an assistant director as well as working in production offices, eventually directing his first film Revolt of the Praetorians in 1964.

Following the release of Star Wars, Brescia shot five science fiction films in a row, Anno zero: guerra nello spazio, Battaglie negli spazi stellari (aka Battle of the Stars), La guerra dei robot, Star Odyssey and The Beast in Space. The Beast in Space was a science fiction pornography film based on Walerian Borowczyk's The Beast.

In the 1980s, with the decline of genre cinema, Brescia's output drastically diminished. His final works included Iron Warrior and Miami Cops and Omicidio a luci blu. He directed his last film in 1995, Club Vacanze, which failed to interest a distributor, making it the only film he lost money on.

Brescia died in Rome on 5 May 2001.

== Style and reception ==
Italian film historian Roberto Curti described Brescia as "a hack, but a reliable one." Curti noted that Brescia was "one of the most prolific and versatile Italian filmmakers of the 1970s." Throughout his career, Brescia adapted to the popular cinematic trends of the era, directing works across a wide variety of genres including peplum (sword-and-sandal), Spaghetti Westerns, war films, mondo films, gialli, erotic films, superhero films, children's films, and low-budget science fiction.

== Selected filmography ==
Note: The films listed as N/A are not necessarily chronological.

Title	Year	Credited as				Notes	Ref(s)
Title	Year	Director	Screenwriter	Screen story writer	Other	Notes	Ref(s)
Gladiators 7	1962				Yes	Assistant director	
The Magnificent Gladiator	1964	Yes	Yes				
The Conqueror of Atlantis	1965	Yes	Yes				
The Colt is My Law	1965	Yes	Yes	Yes			
Gold Train	1965		Yes				
How to Rob the Bank of Italy	1966			Yes			
Days of Violence	1967	Yes					
Battle of the Amazons	1973	Yes					
Super Stooges vs. the Wonder Women	1974	Yes	Yes				
Blood and Bullets	1976	Yes	Yes				
The New Godfathers	1979	Yes					
Iron Warrior	1987	Yes	Yes	Yes			
Cosmos: War of the Planets	—N/a	Yes	Yes	Yes			
Battle of the Stars	—N/a	Yes	Yes				
War of the Robots	—N/a	Yes	Yes				
Star Odyssey	—N/a	Yes	Yes	Yes			
The Beast in Space	—N/a	Yes	Yes	Yes			

== Notes ==
=== References ===
- Curti, Roberto (2013). Italian Crime Filmography, 1968–1980. McFarland. ISBN 978-0-7864-6976-5.
- Curti, Roberto (2016). Diabolika: Supercriminals, Superheroes and the Comic Book Universe in Italian Cinema. Midnight Marquee Press. ISBN 978-1-936168-60-6.
- Grant, Kevin (2011). Any Gun Can Play. Fab Press. ISBN 978-1-903254-61-5.
- Kinnard, Roy; Crnkovich, Tony (2017). Italian Sword and Sandal Films, 1908–1990. McFarland. ISBN 978-1-4766-6291-6.
