= Nick Jordan (actor) =

Italian actor (1941–1990)

- Born: Aldo Canti; 16 May 1941; Italy
- Died: 22 January 1990 (aged 48); Rome, Italy
- Occupations: Actor, Stuntman

Aldo Canti, often credited as Nick Jordan (1941–1990), was an Italian actor and stuntman. He is mostly known for his silent role as Alley Cat/Indio in the classic Spaghetti Western Sabata (1969), starring Lee Van Cleef.

== Biography ==
Born Aldo Canti in Rome, Nick Jordan was a stuntman and character actor. He appeared in over two dozen films during his career from 1961 to 1980 and is best remembered for his appearances in two of the Sabata Western films: in Sabata (1969) he co-starred as Indio/Alley Cat, a mute sidekick of the protagonist with a great capacity for acrobacies and jumping at great lengths. Jordan appeared again in Return of Sabata (1971, the last film of the series) as Angel, a similar role as Indio/Alley Cat since the character is also mute and has great physical skills, only that this time he has a brother with the same demeanor and abilities, and both work as hired robbers. Additionally, Jordan appeared in several films in the Three Fantastic Supermen series.

Jordan/Canti was also reportedly linked to the Italian mob, organizing underground gambling dens for the Rome-based Banda della Magliana gang. His death in 1990 is speculated to have been related to these activities.

=== Death ===
According to an article posted on 8 June 2018 in Westernsallitaliana.blogspot.com (westernsallitaliana.blogspot.com/2018/06/spaghetti-western-trivia-mysterious.html Spaghetti Western Trivia ~ The Mysterious Death of Nick Jordan), in his time away from movie productions Aldo Canti was an organizer of clandestine gambling dens and linked to the already mentioned Band of Magliana. He apparently had let a few of his patrons run up a sizable debt. He made arrangements to meet them at Rome's Villa Borghese Park on 21 January 1990. He was found shot in the head at the Villa Borghese Trolley the following morning. During the investigation that followed it was established that he was killed by two persons he knew and that had a gambling debt with him, but the killers were never found.

== Selected filmography ==
- The Revenge of the Crusader (1964)
- War of the Planets (1966)
- The Three Fantastic Supermen (1967)
- Five For Hell (1969)
- Sabata (1969)
- Return of Sabata (1971)
- Super Stooges vs. the Wonder Women (1973)
- War of the Planets (1977)
