= Gloria Paul =

Retired British film actress (b. 1940)

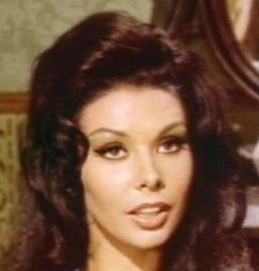
- Paul in Two Sons of Ringo (1967).
- Born: 28 February 1940 (age 86); London, England
- Occupation: Actress
- Years active: 1961–1996

Gloria Paul (born 28 February 1940) is a British retired film actress and dancer.

== Biography ==
Paul was born in London in February 1940. Her father was a journalist and her mother was an opera singer. She began dancing at the age of three years, and began her professional career after high school. While on tour in Rome with an Argentinian ballet company, she decided to quit the company and try her luck in the film industry.

== Career ==
She quickly became an appreciated actress in comedies, having her first major role in Totò, Peppino e... la dolce vita. In 1964 she appeared with Franco and Ciccio in the Goldfinger parody Two Mafiosi Against Goldfinger. In 1966 she starred in the comedy western For a Few Dollars Less alongside Lando Buzzanca. Beyond these, she also acted in theater and worked as a dancer in musical revues with Renato Rascel. She was also one of the first "showgirls" on Italian television.

Paul also made several appearances on English TV, including The Benny Hill Show, and had a major role in the Morecambe and Wise film The Intelligence Men. She was also considered for the role of Domino Derval in the 1965 James Bond film Thunderball, which eventually went to Claudine Auger.

In Darling Lili (1970), starring Julie Andrews and Rock Hudson, Paul played the pivotal role of "Crepe Suzette", who was Andrews's rival for Hudson's affections. Her role featured a striptease scene that Andrews parodied in a later sequence. Paul's last appearance was in the 1996 anthology film Esercizi di stile.

In 1996, she was victim of a freak accident in which a water heater fell through the ceiling onto her while she was taking a shower. The accident paralyzed her from the waist down and forced her retirement from acting.

== Sources ==
- it:Gloria Paul#Biografia
