= Cosmos: War of the Planets =

- Directed by: Alfonso Brescia
- Screenplay by: Alfonso Brescia; Aldo Crudo
- Story by: Alfonso Brescia; Aldo Crudo
- Produced by: Luigi Alessi
- Starring: John Richardson; Yanti Somer; Massimo Bonetti; Romeo Costatini; Katia Christine; Daniele Dublino; Giuseppe Fortis; Percy Hogan; Eleonora King; Malisa Longo; Vassili Karis
- Cinematography: Silvio Fraschetti
- Edited by: Carlo Reali
- Music by: Marcello Giombini
- Production company: Nais Film
- Distributed by: Variety Distribution
- Release date: 1977
- Running time: 89 minutes
- Country: Italy
- Language: English

Cosmos: War of the Planets (Italian: Anno zero – Guerra nello spazio, lit. 'Year Zero – War in Space') is a 1977 English-language Italian science fiction film directed by Alfonso Brescia and starring John Richardson.

== Plot ==
On a spacecraft, a crew finds explosions in space and asteroids flying by. They are afraid that they are going to be hit, but their vessel's computer, named Wiz, tells them that they were seeing the "refraction" of an event that took place millions of years ago. Overjoyed, the ship's crew embrace each other. Later in the Orion space complex of Captain Mike Hamilton who is called to report on himself slapping an officer to the base commander. He says that the other officer did not give him a command personally, but told him to follow the directions of a computer.

Hamilton and his ship, the MK-31, are sent to repair an automated satellite. One of the crew floats over to the satellite and starts work. Viewing this on the screen, Hamilton is upset because it is required that space walkers work in teams of two, and predicts that the acid in the battery will eat through the astronaut's suit. The astronaut says that he is in control of the situation – but it does start to eat through his suit. Hamilton himself goes to rescue him. Later, a couple of astronauts wish to be intimate so they recline on separate beds while a light show machine plays between them while Hamilton tells a female crew member that he does not like this mechanized intimacy and kisses her and that he prefers the old-fashioned way of kissing.

The crew of the MK-31 then investigate an unstable planet where two flying saucers are seen orbiting it. The sensors of the ship state that these alien machines have "disintegrators" and Hamilton commands that they be destroyed, but they struck first leading the MK-31 to spin quickly. Eventually Hamilton gets the ship's engines to counteract the spin and the ship lands on the planet. A portal on this desert planet teleports people who walk through it underground. The first man through it, and a woman who wanders away later, get attacked, but the main body of explorers meet a race of aliens. Their elder says that they are under the control of an evil computer. The astronauts pledge to help the inhabitants of the planet escape their enslavement and succeed in destroying the computer. The ensuing explosion takes out the planet, leading to the crew and one surviving alien set off for Earth only to face further difficulties when a human member of the crew is possessed by the computer and goes on a killing spree. The alien eventually manages to subdue him, heroically sacrificing his own life. Although the crew are pleased at returning to Earth, the voice of the computer Wiz changes to that of the planet's computer.

== Cast ==
- John Richardson as Captain Fred Hamilton
- Yanti Somer as Meela
- Massimo Bonetti as Vassilov
- Aldo Canti as Etor
- Craig Kelly (credited as Romeo Costantini) as Commander Armstrong
- Katia Christine as Greta
- Daniele Dublino as Jack
- Giuseppe Fortis as Marseille
- Percy Hogan as Dr. Max Wright
- Eleonora King as Oko
- Vassili Karis as Peter Segura
- Malisa Longo as Halla
- West Buchanan as Richard Holden
- Charles Borromel as Macintosh
- Jacques Stany as Miller

== Release ==
Cosmos: War of the Planets was released in 1977. It grossed a total of 123,200,000 Italian lire domestically in Italy.

== Reception ==
From a contemporary review in Italy, L'Unità found the film to have drawn too much inspiration from several films of the past and that it had a poor quality script. Film historian Howard Hughes described the film as a remake of the 1965 film Planet of the Vampires.

In his Cinema Italiano: The Complete Guide from Classics to Cult, Hughes criticizes the movie in every respect, for the script, special effects, costumes, music, and acting. Likewise, in his TV Movies and Video Guide, Leonard Maltin gives the film two stars and pans the special effects and acting.

== Notes ==
=== References ===
- Curti, Roberto (2013). Italian Crime Filmography, 1968-1980. McFarland. ISBN 978-0786469765.
- Chiti, Roberto; Poppi, Roberto; Pecorari, Mario (1991). Dizionario del cinema italiano: Dal 1970 al 1979. Vol. 4. Gremese Editore. ISBN 8876059350.
