= Gianfranco Parolini =

Italian film director (1925–2018)

Gianfranco Parolini (20 February 1925 in Rome, Italy – 26 April 2018 in Rome, Italy) was an Italian film director. He is often credited as Frank Kramer. Among his films are The Sabata Trilogy, several sword and sandal films, most of the Kommissar X films and a number of Spaghetti Westerns.

He claimed to have written over 100 thriller novels before becoming an assistant to Giuseppe Amato.

== Filmography ==
=== Director ===
- Francis the Smuggler (1953)
- Samson (1961)
- The Fury of Hercules (1962)
- 79 A.D. (1962)
- The Old Testament (1962)
- The Ten Gladiators (I dieci gladiatori) (1963)
- Mission to Hell (1964)
- 3 Avengers (1964)
- Left Handed Johnny West (1965)
- Kiss Kiss, Kill Kill (1966)
- Kommissar X – In den Klauen des goldenen Drachen (1966)
- The Three Fantastic Supermen (1967)
- If You Meet Sartana Pray for Your Death (Se incontri Sartana prega per la tua morte) (1968)
- Five for Hell (Cinque per l'inferno), aka Five Into Hell (1969)
- Sabata (Ehi amico ... c'è Sabata, hai chiuso!) (1969)
- Adiós, Sabata (Indio Black, sai che ti dico: Sei un gran figlio di...) (1970)
- Return of Sabata (È tornato Sabata... hai chiuso un'altra volta) (1971)
- God's Gun (Diamante Lobo) (1975)
- We Are No Angels (Noi non siamo angeli) (1975)
- Yeti: Giant of the 20th Century (1977)

=== Writer ===
- Fountain of Trevi (1960, directed by Carlo Campogalliani)

=== Actor ===
- Little Red Monkey (1955) - Police Inspector May - sanitorium
- The Ten Gladiators (1963) - Livius Verus
- Mission to Hell (1964) - Thug at Information Booth (uncredited)
- Kommissar X – In den Klauen des goldenen Drachen (1966) - Rex
- Kommissar X - Drei blaue Panther (1968) - Smoky
- If You Meet Sartana Pray for Your Death (1968) - Gambler
- Roma. L'antica chiave dei sensi (1984) - Senator Lucius
- Alla ricerca dell'impero sepolto (1987) - Prof. Alexis Xristopoulos (final film role)
