= Produzioni Europee Associati =

Spanish production company

Produzioni Europee Associati (PEA) is an Italian film production company founded in 1962 by Alberto Grimaldi to produce international co-productions. It released its first feature film The Shadow of Zorro (L'ombra di Zorro) in December that year. Its next production was its first Spaghetti Western: Texas Ranger (I due violenti) released in 1964.

After the immense success of A Fistful of Dollars (1964) in popularizing the genre, United Artists financed the rest of Sergio Leone's Dollars Trilogy films—For a Few Dollars More (1965) and The Good, the Bad and the Ugly (1966)—and signed a contract to distribute PEA films.

In 1976, due to the growing popularity of the cinema of the United States, PEA lost vitality (as well as viewers) and eventually limited its work solely to productions in Europe. In 2002, it produced Gangs of New York by the name of Alberto Grimaldi Productions.
