= Alberto Dell'Acqua =

Italian stuntman and actor

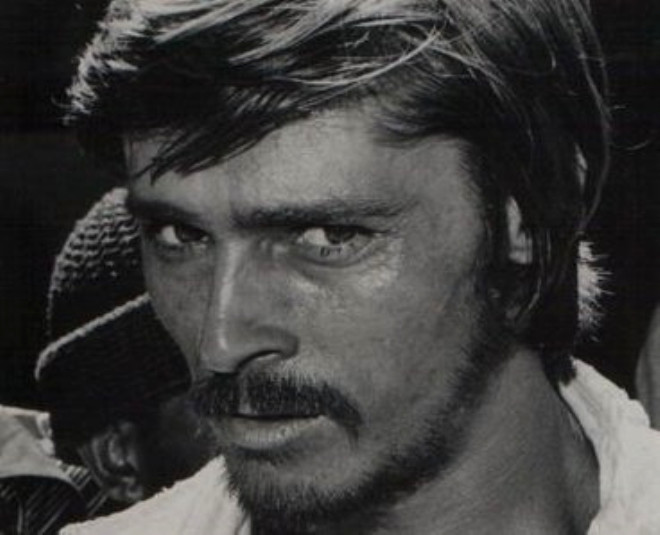
- credited as Robert Widmark
- Born: 14 May 1944 (age 82); Campobasso, Italy
- Other names: Robert Widmark; Cole Kitosh; Al Waterman; Albert Nova
- Occupations: Actor, stuntman, circus artist
- Years active: 1955–2001 (Cinema & TV); active in circus arts
- Parent(s): Fausto Dell'Acqua, Giovanna Huesca
- Relatives: Roberto, Arnaldo, Ottaviano, and Franco Dell'Acqua (brothers); Nené Huesca (uncle)

Alberto Dell'Acqua (born 14 May 1944) is a prominent Italian actor and stuntman, widely celebrated for his extensive work in Spaghetti Westerns, action films, and cult horror. Coming from a legendary circus family, his physical agility, acrobatic background, and stunt expertise made him a staple of European genre cinema through the 1960s, 70s, and 80s. He often performed under pseudonyms such as Albert Waterman or Cole Kitosh early in his career.

== Early life and circus background ==
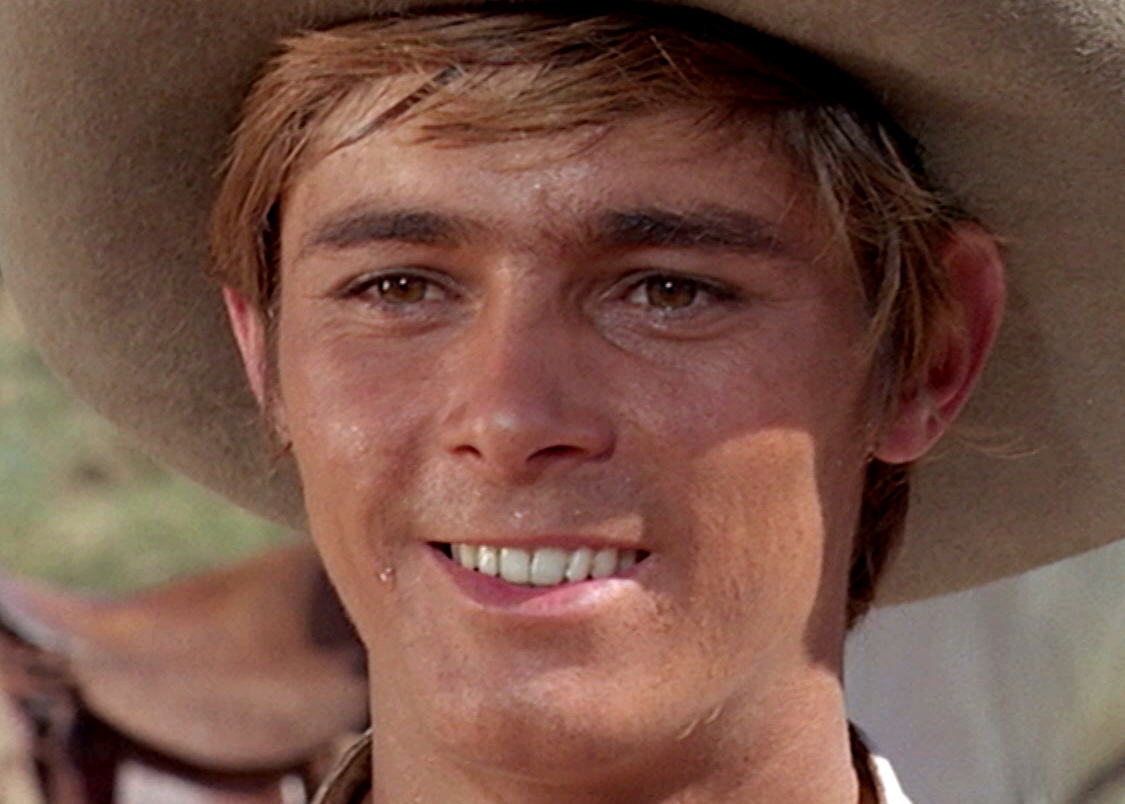
Dell'Acqua in Up the MacGregors! (1967)

Dell'Acqua was born in Campobasso, Italy, into one of Italy's most prestigious traditional circus families, a multi-generational dynasty associated with renowned shows such as the Royal Circus, Circo Demar, and Togni Circus. He is the son of Fausto Dell'Acqua and Giovanna Huesca—sister of the celebrated clown Nené Huesca. Alongside his brothers Roberto, Arnaldo, Ottaviano, and Franco—all of whom also pursued careers as actors and stunt performers in Italian genre cinema—he trained extensively in acrobatics, tumbling, and physical performance from childhood.

Reflecting on his identity in later interviews, Dell'Acqua described himself as "a circus performer lent to the cinema," noting that the physical discipline and spatial awareness acquired under the big top directly enabled his transition into stunt work.

== Career ==
=== Beginnings and stunt work ===
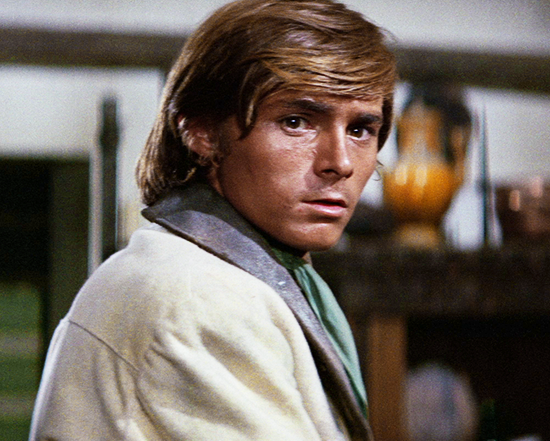
Dell'Acqua in Texas, Addio (1966)

After making a childhood screen appearance in Luigi Capuano's [La rossa (film 1955)| La Rossa], Dell'Acqua's formal entry into the film industry occurred incidentally in the early 1960s. While assisting renowned master-of-arms Freddy Unger with circus equipment and providing a trampoline for a film production, Dell'Acqua impressed Unger with his athleticism. Unger subsequently hired the 18-year-old as a stuntman for the 1964 feature I malamondo, produced by Titanus with a score by Ennio Morricone. That same year, Dell'Acqua received his first credited acting role as Valerius in Antonio Margheriti's sword-and-sandal epic Giants of Rome (1964) by Anthony Dawson.

=== Breakthrough in Spaghetti Westerns ===
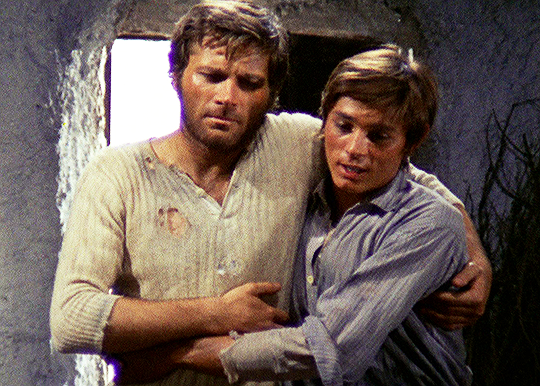
Dell'Acqua (Left) and Nero (Right) in Man, Pride and Vengeance (1968)

Dell'Acqua's breakthrough as a leading and supporting actor arrived with Franco Giraldi's Seven Guns for the MacGregors (1966) (7 pistole per i MacGregor), in which he portrayed Dick MacGregor under the stage name Albert Waterman. Giraldi had previously met Dell'Acqua while serving as an assistant director on I malamondo and specifically sought him out for the role. During the Spanish location shoot, Dell'Acqua suffered his first serious on-set work accident while performing stunts, though he recovered quickly enough to complete filming to the applause of the crew. He reprised his role in the sequel Up the MacGregors! (7 donne per i MacGregor, 1967).

This led to a lead role in Texas, Addio, playing the younger brother of Franco Nero. The two actors developed a lifelong friendship during the production. During this period, producer Manolo Bolognini briefly imposed the pseudonym Cole Kitosh on him, though Dell'Acqua felt the name did not contribute to his success. In the film, he portrayed the naive and idealistic younger brother of Sheriff Burt Sullivan (played by Franco Nero). His character stubbornly accompanies Burt on a journey to Mexico in pursuit of the sadistic bandit Cisco Delgado. (José Suárez), aiming to avenge their father's murder. As the brothers become entangled with a group of Mexican revolutionaries, the story builds toward a violent and emotionally charged climax. Dell'Acqua's performance received positive attention from reviewers; in a retrospective review of the Blu-ray release, Fanboy Destroy wrote: "It’s all Nero’s show, but Dell’Acqua’s athletic stunts and striking good looks make him a pretty decent co-star."

In 1968, Dell'Acqua collaborated once again with his on-screen brother, Franco Nero, in the film Man, Pride and Vengeance, directed by Luigi Bazzoni. This film is a Western adaptation of the novella Carmen by Prosper Mérimée. During filming, on a particularly scorching day in Spain, Dell'Acqua lay down to rest about half an hour before a scheduled break. When the break began, Nero called out to him to join the crew. However, Dell'Acqua was not merely asleep; he had suffered a heatstroke. Fortunately, Nero quickly recognized the seriousness of the situation and took him to the hospital, ultimately saving his life.

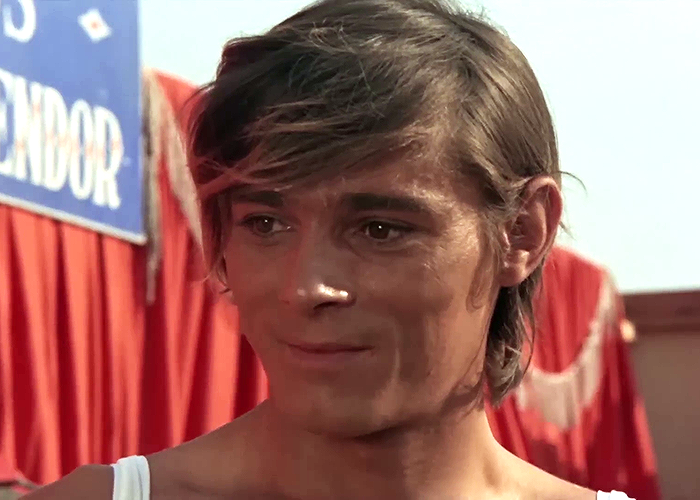
Dell'Acqua in Fighters from Ave Maria (1970)

In 1970, Alberto Dell'Acqua appeared in the Italian Spaghetti Western Fighters from Ave Maria (I vendicatori dell’Ave Maria), directed by Bitto Albertini. The film is set during the California Gold Rush and combines elements of action and comedy within the Western genre, following a troupe of circus acrobats who become embroiled in the struggles of a small frontier town. Dell'Acqua portrays Pete Garrison, one of the Garrison brothers and a member of the traveling circus troupe whose acrobatic skills and courage aid the inhabitants of the town of Goldfield against the oppressive landowner Parker.

=== International Co-Productions, Cult Horror, and Later Work (1973–2001) ===
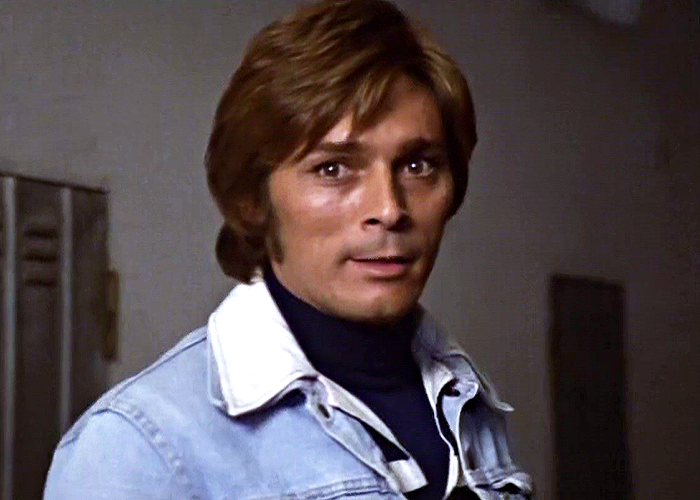
Dell'Acqua in The Perfect Killer (1977)

Dell'Acqua transitioned to leading man status, adopting the name Robert Widmark. He famously replaced an American actor in Alleluja & Sartana are Sons... Sons of God (1972) directed by Mario Siciliano because the original lead lacked the athletic ability to perform the fight scenes. The film was a major commercial success in Germany, earning Dell'Acqua a special industry award.

In 1973, Dell’Acqua starred in the Italian-Spanish Spaghetti Western adventure film Man with the Golden Winchester (Il figlio di Zorro), directed by Gianfranco Baldanello. In the film, portrays Don Rocardo Villaverde, a masked hero identified with the legendary figure of Zorro.

In 1979, Dell’Acqua appeared in the Italian-Spanish-Yugoslav crime thriller Dinero maldito (also known internationally as Killer’s Gold), directed by Sergio Garrone. In the film, Dell’Acqua portrays the character José, a professional thief caught up in a violent struggle for stolen money after betrayal within a criminal underworld. The plot centers on José’s conflict with gangsters intent on reclaiming the loot, weaving elements of action and crime drama throughout the narrative.

=== Injuries and death-defying stunts ===
Dell’Acqua was known for performing his own stunts and, as a result, sustained several serious injuries during his career. While filming Seven Guns for the MacGregors, he was involved in a horse-riding accident that caused fractured vertebrae, a skull fracture, and five broken ribs, requiring four months of recovery in a body cast before he resumed work on the film.

During productions in Colombia, he performed a wing-walking stunt on an aircraft at an altitude of approximately 1,000 metres and was later blown from a military ship into the sea, narrowly avoiding drowning. In an incident known as the “Cocomero” accident, he suffered a severe internal hematoma to his back during a wagon stunt. Despite the injury, he continued filming in the Italian–Spanish action film The Perfect Killer (1977) (directed by Mario Siciliano) with Lee Van Cleef after undergoing a surgical procedure in which the hematoma was drained and gauze was inserted to allow limited mobility during production.

In the film, Dell'Acqua portrayed the character Luc, a younger professional assassin sent by a clandestine organization to pursue the protagonist, Harry Chapman (played by Lee Van Cleef). The plot follows Chapman after he is coerced into working as a hitman; as the story unfolds, Luc becomes a significant antagonist whose pursuit adds tension to the narrative. Dell'Acqua's performance in the film reflects his versatility beyond the Spaghetti Western genre that initially brought him recognition in the 1960s and 1970s, showcasing his ability to work in crime‑oriented action roles as well.

== Personal life and return to the circus ==
During his time as a rising star in the Spaghetti Western genre, Dell'Acqua was a prominent figure in the social scene of Almería and Madrid. He confirmed a romantic connection with Spanish actress Elisa Montés during the filming of Texas, Addio. Decades later, the two maintained a warm friendship; in 2017, Dell'Acqua traveled to Spain to surprise Montés at the Almería Western Film Festival, where they were both honored for their contributions to the genre.

In the late 1970s, at the height of his international popularity, Dell'Acqua abruptly left the film industry. While traveling to a vacation in Calabria, he stopped at his relatives' circus and decided to stay to ensure he could be present for his children's upbringing. He spent the next seven years back in the circus world.

His family has continued the circus tradition; his children became accomplished artists, and his granddaughter won a silver award at the Monte Carlo Circus Festival for "antipodism" (foot juggling).

In his later years, Dell'Acqua has expressed a deep nostalgia for the Western genre, stating that "the actor is truly seen in the Western" due to the unique physicality and behavioral changes the genre requires of a performer.

=== Retirement from cinema and family legacy ===
In the late 1970s, Dell'Acqua was at the peak of his international career, particularly following the success of his "Robert Widmark" action films in Germany and Turkey. His retirement was not a planned professional move but a sudden personal decision made during a family road trip.

While driving his caravan toward a campsite in Gioia Tauro, Calabria, for a summer vacation, Dell'Acqua passed a circus belonging to his relatives. He intended to stop for only a few days, but after seeing his children "bloom" while practicing in the circus ring, he decided to abandon his film career entirely to ensure his family stayed together. He famously stated that his phone "rang off the hook" with film offers at his home in Rome, but he refused to return, choosing instead to spend the next seven to eight years traveling with the circus.

In a brief attempt to merge his two worlds, Dell'Acqua founded a traveling theater-circus company called Diva le Risate. The show combined circus attractions with comedic sketches inspired by the legendary Italian comedian Totò. The venture saw success in campsites and small venues for two years, but Dell'Acqua was forced to close the business after a violent storm destroyed the performance tent and he was unable to secure further government funding.

== Selected filmography ==
Year	Title	Role	Notes
1955	La rossa	Bambino	Italian film; uncredited child debut
1964	Giants of Rome	Valerius	Italian/French film; first credited role
1965	Seven Guns for the MacGregors	Dick MacGregor	Italian Spaghetti Western; credited as Albert Waterman
1966	Texas, Adios	Jim Sullivan	Italian Spaghetti Western; credited as Cole Kitosch
1967	Up the MacGregors!	Dick MacGregor	Italian Spaghetti Western
1967	Wanted		Italian Spaghetti Western
1967	Long Days of Hate	Rooney	Italian Spaghetti Western
1968	A Minute to Pray, a Second to Die		Italian Spaghetti Western; uncredited
1968	Man, Pride and Vengeance	Remendado	Italian Spaghetti Western
1968	Kill Them All and Come Back Alone	The Kid	Italian Spaghetti Western
1968	A Sky Full of Stars for a Roof		Italian Spaghetti Western
1968	Il suo nome gridava vendetta		Italian Spaghetti Western
1968	Vengeance	Richie	Italian Spaghetti Western
1969	Boot Hill	Sam	Italian Spaghetti Western
1970	I vendicatori dell'Ave Maria	Pete	Italian Spaghetti Western
1970	They Call Me Trinity		Italian Spaghetti Western; stuntman / bit part
1971	Return of Sabata		Italian Spaghetti Western
1972	Trinity and Sartana Are Coming	Sartana	Italian Spaghetti Western; credited as Robert Widmark
1972	Alleluja & Sartana are Sons... Sons of God	Sartana	Italian Spaghetti Western; credited as Robert Widmark
1973	Battle of the Amazons	Llio	Italian/Spanish film
1974	Man with the Golden Winchester	Don Rocardo Villaverde / Zorro	aka Son of Zorro; Italian/Spanish film
1974	Dschungelmädchen für zwei Halunken	Jeff	West German/Italian film
1975	Zwei Teufelskerle auf dem Weg ins Kloster	Jim	West German/Italian film
1975	Üç Kağıtçılar / Che carambole... ragazzi!!!	Piç Rıza	Turkish/Italian bilingual film
1976	Baş Belası	Piç Rıza / Fırlama Necmi	Turkish film
1977	Babanın Evlatları	Pire Mehmet	Turkish film
1977	California		Italian Spaghetti Western
1977	The Perfect Killer	Luc	Italian film
1979	Zombi 2	Zombi	Italian/American film
1983	Endgame	Gabe Mantrax	Italian film
1989	After Death	Scientist	Italian film
1998	The Son of Sandokan	Jafar	Italian TV series
2001	Nella terra di nessuno		Italian film
