= La bambolona =

- Italian theatrical release poster
- Directed by: Franco Giraldi
- Screenplay by: Ruggero Maccari; Franco Giraldi
- Based on: La bambolona 1967 novel by Alba de Céspedes
- Starring: Ugo Tognazzi; Isabella Rei
- Cinematography: Dario Di Palma
- Edited by: Ruggero Mastroianni
- Music by: Luis Bacalov
- Production company: Mega Film
- Distributed by: Panta Cinematografica
- Release date: 1968
- Running time: 107 minutes
- Country: Italy
- Language: Italian

La bambolona (internationally released as Baby Doll and Big Baby Doll) is a 1968 Italian comedy film directed by Franco Giraldi. It is the Giraldi's fifth film after four successful spaghetti western and the first film in which he is credited with his real name and not as Frank Garfield. The film also represents the first of the four collaborations between Giraldi and the screenwriter Ruggero Maccari. The film is based on the novel with the same name written by Alba De Céspedes.

For his role in this movie Ugo Tognazzi was awarded with a Nastro d'Argento for Best Actor. He later starred in two more movies directed by Giraldi, Cuori solitari and La supertestimone.

== Cast ==
- Ugo Tognazzi as Giulio Broggini
- Isabella Rei as Ivana
- Corrado Sonni as Rosario, Ivana's father
- Lilla Brignone as Adelina, Ivana's mother
- Marisa Bartoli as Luisa
- Susy Andersen as Silvia
- Margherita Guzzinati as Daria
