= Texas, Adios =

1966 film

- Italian poster
- Directed by: Ferdinando Baldi
- Screenplay by: Ferdinando Baldi; Franco Rossetti
- Produced by: Manolo Bolognini
- Starring: Franco Nero; Alberto Dell'Acqua; José Suarez; Elisa Montés
- Cinematography: Enzo Barboni
- Edited by: Sergio Montanari
- Music by: Anton Abril
- Production companies: B.R.C. Produzione Film; Estela Films
- Distributed by: Euro International Films (Italy); C.C.D. (Spain)
- Release dates: 26 August 1966 (Italy); 22 June 1967 (Spain)
- Running time: 93 minutes
- Countries: Italy; Spain

Texas, Adios (Italian: Texas, addio; Spanish: Adiós, Texas) is a 1966 Italian-Spanish spaghetti Western film co-written and directed by Ferdinando Baldi and starring Franco Nero, Alberto Dell'Acqua (as Cole Kitosch), José Suárez and Elisa Montés.

Arriving shortly after Django, and featuring some of the same team but a different director, it ditches much of the former's European idiosyncrasies. Instead, it opts for a more classical, Hollywood-inspired approach that has been likened, including by Nero himself, to the films of Gary Cooper. Perhaps for this reason, it is not as widely remembered as its predecessor, although it was a commercial success at the time.

== Synopsis ==
A two-fisted and taciturn Texas sheriff, Burt Sullivan, is a man committed to duty and justice but possessed by a desire for revenge. Sullivan, along with his younger brother Jim, crosses the border to bring wealthy and sadistic Mexican crime boss Cisco Delgado to justice for the murder of their father. Eventually joining forces with a group of Mexican revolutionaries, Burt and Jim soon find themselves at the center of a bloodbath.

== Cast ==
- Franco Nero as Sheriff Burt Sullivan
- Alberto Dell'Acqua as Jim Sullivan (credited as Cole Kitosch)
- José Suárez as Cisco Delgado
- Elisa Montés as "Dancing" Mulatta
- José Guardiola as McLeod
- Livio Lorenzon as Alcalde Miguel, the Mayor
- Hugo Blanco as Pedro
- Luigi Pistilli as Hernandez, the Lawyer
- Antonella Murgia as Burt's Mother In Flashback
- Gino Pernice as Bank Employee
- Giovanni Ivan Scratuglia (credited as Ivan Scratuglia) as Dick, Burt's Deputy
- Silvana Bacci as Paquita, the Barmaid
- Remo De Angelis as Juan, Delgado Henchman
- Mario Novelli as Bounty Hunter
- Enrico Chiappafreddo as Outlaw (uncredited)
- Lucio De Santis as McLeod Henchman (uncredited)

== Production ==
=== Development ===
Texas, Adios was the second film in a planned three-picture contract between star Franco Nero and Manolo Bolognini's B.R.C. Produzione Film of Rome, after the highly influential Django. It was co-produced with Estela Films of Madrid, a joint venture between Eduardo Manzanos Brochero and Jorge Tusell which partnered on other notable Westerns of the era like Seven Guns for the MacGregors. Although only about three months elapsed between his two films for Bolognini, Nero still found time to star in Massacre Time, another Western whose story has been compared to that of Texas, Adios.

According to film historian Marco Giusti, making the film a Django sequel was considered. It was offered to Django helmer Sergio Corbucci, who turned it down. A young Ruggero Deodato, who had been Corbucci's assistant on Navajo Joe and Django, saw the project as a potential career booster and lobbied hard to direct it, but Bolognini ultimately chose Ferdinando Baldi, who was a friend of his. Baldi had almost directed Django, when Corbucci had second thoughts about doing it. This was his first Western as a director. It was announced in the Italian trade press right as production commenced.

=== Filming ===
The film was shot in April and May 1966. Baldi was a quick, no-frills craftsman, forcing producer Bolognini to stay on set and order more takes, as he feared the director would miss some technical details that were crucial to the Western genre. Renzo Rosselini was asked by Baldi to be his assistant; he accepted as a friendly gesture and for the fun of working on a Western. Although Corbucci was absent, other crew members did return from Django, such as cinematographer Enzo Barboni, stunt coordinator Remo De Angelis and costume designer Giancarlo Simi. During the shoot, Barboni, who aspired to direct, tried to pitch a more comedic take on the Western to Nero, who was not interested. It would become the runaway hit They Call Me Trinity a few years later.

The shoot took place in Spain and Italy. Spanish locations encompassed various locations in the Community of Madrid and the Tabernas Desert in the province of Almería. Nero sometimes socialized with Clint Eastwood, who was shooting The Good, the Bad and the Ugly in Almería, and several supporting actors (Lorenzon, Pistilli, Bacci) appeared in both films. A few more locations were found in the vicinity of Rome. Studio scenes were also shot in Rome, at Cinecittà and Elios Studios for the Mexican village lot. By the time of filming, Nero's career had changed course, and was Hollywood-bound to play Lancelot in Camelot. Director Joshua Logan called him regularly to urge him to stay away from physical scenes, so as to not endanger his participation in his own film.

Immediately after wrapping up his part, Nero moved on to Camelot. Some of the principals did not provide their own voice, even in their native language, a common occurrence in European genre films at the time. Nero and Dell'Acqua were respectively voiced in Italian by Enrico Maria Salerno and it:Massimo Turci, and Montés was voiced in Spanish by Lola Cervantes. Suárez did voice himself in Spanish.

== Release ==
At the start of production, Texas, Adios was announced for Italian release on 2 September 1966 through Euro International Films, but it was moved up slightly to 26 August. It came fairly close to matching Django's success in the market, grossing ITL903 million. In Spain, it was released by Cooperativa cinematográfica de distribución and opened in Madrid on 22 June 1967. It drew 993,000 admissions.

In some territories, including West Germany where Django had been a bonafide hit, the film was one of many to be marketed as a pseudo sequel. There, it was re-titled Django, Der Rächer ('Django, The Avenger') by Constantin Film, and was the 10th best attended film of the year. In the U.K., the film released by Supreme Film Distributors as The Avenger, as part of a double feature with El 'Che' Guevara. It opened in Liverpool on 17 October 1970.

=== Special screenings ===
Texas, Adios was screened as part of a Franco Nero mini-retrospective presented during the 8th Los Angeles, Italia Film, Fashion and Art Fest in February 2013.

=== Home media ===
The film received an English-language tape from U.K. label Inter-Ocean in 1980. Texas, Adios was part of a trilogy of Nero DVD reissues from Anchor Bay Entertainment in 2001, with Compañeros and Keoma. In 2018, the film was re-issued on Blu-ray by British outfit Arrow Video.

=== Soundtrack ===
Although the film itself paid tribute to American Westerns, Spanish composer Antón García Abril noted that his score was primarily influenced by his Italian contemporaries who worked in the genre.

== Reception ==
=== Contemporary ===
The Italian daily Corriere d'informazione called Texas, Adios an "umpteenth festival of violence" and added that it "follows faithfully the by-now usual pattern of the Italian Western which, all things considered, allows the viewers to get an ever-increasing number of dead bodies on the screen for the same ticket price." La Stampa deemed that the it was "shot masterfully by director of photography [Enzo] Barboni", while director Baldi "carries to its predictable outcome a film once again over-abundant with violence." The paper noted that the ending, which coincided with the advent of a revolution, invited a sequel.

=== Retrospective ===
Trevor Johnston of Time Out described Nero's character as a "standard issue laconic" and the film as "[w]orkmanlike and unpretentious, but not a patch on Leone or even the Django series." Phil Hardy's book The Western found Baldi's direction "Americanized with few of the ritual time-stretching sequences or balletic set-pieces one expects from an Italian Western. Nero's performance, however, is typically Italian." In the book Spaghetti Westerns – The Good, the Bad and the Violent, Tom Weisser opined that "with camerawork by the always excellent Enzo Barboni, this Continental co-production delivers the goods", and features "a good macho score".

== Follow-ups ==
After trying out Hollywood, Nero quickly opted to return to Italy and signed up for 1967's Man, Pride and Vengeance, a Western-style adaptation of Prosper Mérimée's Carmen, in which Dell'Acqua also co-starred. Baldi re-teamed with Bolognini, Barboni and screenwriter Rossetti for 1968's Django, Prepare a Coffin, an official yet loose prequel to the original where Terence Hill replaced Nero.
