= Adolfo Cofiño =

Spanish art director

- Born: February 19, 1931 (age 95); Madrid, Spain
- Occupation: Art director
- Years active: 1955-1988 (film)

Adolfo Cofiño (born 1931) is a Spanish art director. He has designed the sets for more than a hundred productions during his career.

== Selected filmography ==
- Operación Plus Ultra (1966)
- OK Connery (1967)
- Pasqualino Cammarata, Frigate Captain (1974)
- Dick Turpin (1974)
- Zorrita Martinez (1975)

== Bibliography ==
- Bentley, Bernard. A Companion to Spanish Cinema. Boydell & Brewer 2008.
