= Cry, Onion! =

- Italian film poster
- Directed by: Enzo G. Castellari
- Screenplay by: Luciano Vincenzoni; Sergio Donati
- Produced by: Zev Braun; Carlo Ponti
- Starring: Franco Nero; Sterling Hayden; Martin Balsam; Emma Cohen; Leo Anchóriz
- Cinematography: Alejandro Ulloa
- Edited by: Gianfranco Amicucci
- Music by: Guido & Maurizio De Angelis
- Production companies: Compagnia Cinematografica Champion; C.I.P.I. Cinematografica S.A; T.I.T. Filmproduktion GmbH
- Distributed by: Produzione Intercontinentali Cinematografiche
- Release date: 25 August 1975 (Italy)
- Running time: 91 minutes
- Countries: Italy; Spain; West Germany
- Language: Italian

Cry, Onion! (Italian: Cipolla Colt, lit. "Onion Colt", also known as The Smell of Onion) is a 1975 Spaghetti Western comedy film directed by Enzo G. Castellari. It is openly comedic and parodic.

== Cast ==
- Franco Nero as Onion Stark
- Martin Balsam as Petrus Lamb
- Sterling Hayden as Henry 'Jack' Pulitzer
- Dick Butkus as Jeff
- Leo Anchóriz as Sheriff
- Romano Puppo as Stinky
- Neno Zamperla as Oblò - 'Monocle'
- Emma Cohen as Mary Ann Pulitzer
- Massimo Vanni as Buck, Lamb Henchman
- Helmut Brasch as Judge Logan
- Duilio Cruciani as Cal 'Caligola' Foster
- Fernando Castro as Dutch Foster
- Wal Davis as Zeke
- Dan van Husen as Deputy Zachary
- Agustín Bescos as Oil Board Member
- Xan das Bolas as Sam - Merchant
- Charly Bravo as Judd
- Enzo G. Castellari as Deputy Sheriff
- Alejandro de Enciso as John
- Leopold Francis as Mack
- Daniel Martín as Jim
- Antonio Pica as Hal Foster
- George Rigaud as Terrateniente
- Lucy Tiller as Violet
- Mariano Vidal Molina as Owen
- David Warbeck as Villain with Sunglasses
- Manuel Zarzo as Jack

== Release ==
Cry, Onion! was released in Italy on 25 August 1975.

== Trivia ==
The film was broadcast on Tele 5 as part of the programme format SchleFaZ in season 2.
