= Víctor Israel =

Spanish actor (1929–2009)

- Born: José María Soler Vilanova; 13 June 1929; Barcelona, Catalonia, Spain
- Died: 19 September 2009 (aged 80); Barcelona, Catalonia, Spain
- Occupation: Actor
- Years active: 1961–2009

José María Soler Vilanova (13 June 1929 – 19 September 2009), known professionally as Víctor Israel, was a Spanish actor. He was known for his character roles, typically in genre films, in over 200 productions between 1961 and 2008.

== Biography ==
Israel was born José María Soler Vilanova to Catalan parents in Barcelona in 1929. After completing his basic education, Israel studied Commerce. At the same time, he pursued a wide range of cultural and artistic studies, including Psychology, Philosophy, Public Relations, Languages, and Music. His education in Dramatic Arts was divided between Julio Coll and Fernando Espona's acting studio and the Theater Institute.

He began his film career in 1961 in Antonio Isasi-Isasmendi film A Land for All. Throughout his career, he appeared in more than 140 films, mostly horror and westerns, in supporting roles. His distinctive physical appearance made him ideal for playing mysterious and untrustworthy characters. In the 1980s, his workload declined. However, his film image was revived and even honored, with him receiving roles from Catalan filmmakers such as Santiago Lapeira, Carlos Benpar, Antoni Martí, Carlos Balagué, and José Luis Valls, among others.

In terms of television, his participation in the series Doctor Caparrós, medicina general alongside Joan Capri, broadcast in 1979 by Televisión Española on the regional channel TVE Cataluña, is noteworthy.

In 2006, he was awarded the Brigadoon Nosferatu honorary award at the Sitges Film Festival.

He died on September 19, 2009, at the age of 80.

== Selected filmography ==
- Savage Guns (1961) - (uncredited)
- ¿Pena de muerte? (1961) - Amigo de Pablo (uncredited)
- Tierra de todos (1962) - Soldado (uncredited)
- The Lovely Lola (1962) - Modisto (uncredited)
- La cuarta ventana (1963) - Hombre con Montes (uncredited)
- La gran coartada (1963) - Andrés (uncredited)
- La ruta de los narcóticos (1963) - Miembro del Patronato (uncredited)
- El mujeriego (1964) - Huésped
- Circus World (1964) - (uncredited)
- La boda era a las doce (1964) - Camarero (uncredited)
- El salario del crimen (1964) - Delincuente interrogado
- The Thief of Tibidabo (1965)
- Toto of Arabia (1965) - Boris
- Shoot to Kill (1965) - 2nd Gambler
- The Hell of Manitoba (1965) - Hotel Clerk (uncredited)
- Two Sergeants of General Custer (1965)
- Muere una mujer (1965) - Un policia
- Playa de Formentor (1965) - Criado
- Operation Double Cross (1965) - Un technicien de la police
- Doctor Zhivago (1965) - Hospital Inmate (uncredited)
- Tumba para un forajido (1965) - Rembert
- La otra orilla (1965)
- Seven Guns for the MacGregors (1966) - Pianist (uncredited)
- El Greco (1966) - Mental Patient (uncredited)
- The Texican (1966) - Wilkins
- La llamada (1966) - Vigilante
- Dynamite Jim (1966) - Conserje del Hotel
- The Sea Pirate (1966) - (uncredited)
- Yankee (1966) - Sceriffo
- Five for Revenge (1966) - Barber (uncredited)
- Sugar Colt (1966) - Gravedigger
- Hallucination Generation (1966)
- Il grande colpo di Surcouf (1966) - (uncredited)
- The Tough One (1966) - Esbirro de Villarda
- The Good, the Bad and the Ugly (1966) - Sergeant at Confederate Fort (uncredited)
- Huida en la frontera (1966) - Andreas
- Espi... ando (1966)
- Su nombre es Daphne (1966)
- Up the MacGregors! (1967) - Trevor the Tooth-Drawer
- Después del gran robo (1967)
- Bandidos (1967) - Smaller Train Conductor (uncredited)
- La morte non conta i dollari (1967) - Professor Alex (uncredited)
- Killer Adios (1968) - Dixon
- A Devil Under the Pillow (1968) - Delegado inglés
- Operation Mata Hari (1968) - Militar alemán bizco
- No somos de piedra (1968) - Padrino
- White Comanche (1968) - Carter
- Persecución hasta Valencia (1968)
- One Dollar Too Many (1968) - Bakery Boss (uncredited)
- Pistol for a Hundred Coffins (1968) - Barrett, Madman (uncredited)
- A Sky Full of Stars for a Roof (1968) - Innkeeper (uncredited)
- Long-Play (1968) - Hombre que ignora su existencia
- Elisabet (1968)
- O.K. Yevtushenko (1968) - Trilby
- ¿Por qué te engaña tu marido? (1969) - Alfredo
- The Exquisite Cadaver (1969) - Portero
- Mónica Stop (1969) - Espía
- Sundance and the Kid (1969) - Mayor's Supporter (uncredited)
- Cry Chicago (1969) - Dr. MacDonald
- El ángel (1969) - El Rokefeller
- El abogado, el alcalde y el notario (1969) - Pianista
- Matrimonios separados (1969) - El Polvoriento (uncredited)
- The House That Screamed (1969) - Brechard
- The Ancines Woods (1970) - Lameiro
- Long Live the Bride and Groom (1970) - Vicente
- The Arizona Kid (1970) - Frank, 2nd Outlaw Leader
- Cabezas cortadas (1970) - Doctor
- El vértigo del crimen (1970) - Willy
- Compañeros (1970) - Rosenbloom Henchman with Brown Suit (uncredited)
- Topical Spanish (1971) - Técnico de grabación
- The Light at the Edge of the World (1971) - Das Mortes
- Murders in the Rue Morgue (1971) - Cowardly Coachman (uncredited)
- Una chica casi decente (1971) - Carlitos
- Aunque la hormona se vista de seda... (1971) - Sebastián
- Catlow (1971) - Pesquiera
- The Butcher of Binbrook (1971) - Mr. Fowles
- Kill! Kill! Kill! Kill! (1971) - Baron
- Long Live Your Death (1971) - Manuel Mendoza
- Exorcism's Daughter (1971) - Barbero
- His Name Was Holy Ghost (1972) - Priest
- ¡No firmes más letras, cielo! (1972) - Operador de sonidos (uncredited)
- The Summertime Killer (1972) - Mechanic
- Sonny and Jed (1972) - Felipe (uncredited)
- Horror Express (1972) - Maletero - Baggage Man
- Treasure Island (1972) - Morgan
- Trop jolies pour être honnêtes (1972) - Le psychiatre
- What Am I Doing in the Middle of a Revolution? (1972) - Augusto
- Secuestro a la española (1972) - Don Jacinto
- Even Angels Eat Beans (1973) - Giuda
- The Mysterious Island (1973) - Pirate
- High Crime (1973) - Boat Captain (uncredited)
- Ricco the Mean Machine (1973) - Checana, the nightclub owner
- Three Supermen of the West (1973) - Banchiere (uncredited)
- The Witches Mountain (1973) - Posadero
- The Girl from the Red Cabaret (1973) - Abogado
- Jenaro el de los 14 (1974) - El Rendijas
- Un curita cañón (1974) - Damián (uncredited)
- Una pareja... distinta (1974) - Hombre gordo
- El pez de los ojos de oro (1974) - Pedro
- The Marriage Revolution (1974) - Dentista
- El último proceso en París (1974) - Pierre Raymond
- The Werewolf and the Yeti (1975) - Joel
- The White, the Yellow, and the Black (1975) - Tuxedo Prisoner (uncredited)
- What Changed Charley Farthing? (1975) - Christmas
- Clara is the Price (1975) - (uncredited)
- Tres suecas para tres Rodríguez (1975) - Genaro
- Pim, pam, pum... ¡fuego! (1975) - Sr. Dimas
- From Hong Kong with Love (1975) - Victor
- Los hijos de Scaramouche (1975) - Posadero
- Zorrita Martinez (1975) - Paciente con muletas
- Madrid, Costa Fleming (1976) - Obrero
- Las ratas no duermen de noche (1976) - Karl
- Manuela (1976) - Aguacharco
- Las delicias de los verdes años (1976)
- La ciutat cremada (1976) - Inspector Haya
- El secreto inconfesable de un chico bien (1976) - Don Nicolás
- Devil's Kiss (1976) - Baron de Clanchart
- The young Dracula (1976) - Renfield
- Vivir a mil (1976) - Prestamista
- Tío, ¿de verdad vienen de París? (1977) - Guarda
- Sexy... amor y fantasía (1977) - Gerardo
- Cuentos de las sábanas blancas (1977) - Calixto / mesonero
- The Last Remake of Beau Geste (1977) - Legionnaire (uncredited)
- El pobrecito Draculín (1977) - Vladimir
- Me siento extraña (1977) - Invitado
- Makarras Conexion (1977) - Hombre hablando por teléfono
- Las locuras de Jane (1978)
- Carne apaleada (1978) - Recluso Calvo
- Un hombre llamado flor de otoño (1978) - Ramón
- Spectrum (Beyond the World's End) (1978) - Tabernero
- Trampa sexual (1978) - Viajante
- Obscene Desire (1978) - Giovanni
- Killer's Gold (1979) - Morgan
- Rocky Carambola (1979) - Gangster jefe
- Jaguar Lives! (1979) - Sicilian party guest
- Five Forks (1980) - Los Monteros
- Hell of the Living Dead (1980) - Zombie Priest
- La cripta (1981) - Recepcionista
- ¡Viva la Pepa! (1981) - Sr. Fortuny
- Neumonía erótica y pasota (1981) - Pepe
- Made in China (1981) - Doctor Stahl
- Queen Lear (1982) - Hobo
- La rebelión de los pájaros (1982) - Vendedor de pájaros
- Cristóbal Colón, de oficio... descubridor (1982) - Un sefardí
- El ser (1982) - Sepulturero
- Asalto al Banco Central (1983) - El Seta
- Morbus (o bon profit) (1983) - Shiu Shi
- Victòria! La gran aventura d'un poble (1983)
- Juana la Loca... de vez en cuando (1983) - Torturador
- Un genio en apuros (1983) - Profeta
- Victòria! 2: La disbauxa del 17 (1983)
- El invernadero (1983) - Jardinero
- Victòria! 3: El seny i la rauxa (1984)
- Al este del oeste (1984) - Tumbas - Undertaker
- Denver (1985) - Guarda
- Perras callejeras (1985) - Padrastro de Crista
- Serpiente de mar (1985) - Porto
- Acosada (1985) - Simón Montes
- De hombre a hombre (1985) - Borracho
- Escapada final (Scapegoat) (1985) - Encargado alcantarillas
- Los nuevos curanderos (1986) - Ramón
- Más allá de la muerte (1986) - Conserje Academia
- Adela (1987) - Testigo
- La veritat oculta (1987) - Pescador
- Una nit a Casa Blanca (1987)
- Tempesta d'estiu (1987)
- Andalucía chica (1988) - Detective
- Garum (fantástica contradicción) (1988) - Recepcionista
- Bueno y tierno como un ángel (1989)
- El anticristo 2 (Magic London) (1989) - Inspector Welles
- Superagentes en Mallorca (1990)
- Un submarí a les estovalles (1991) - Ramon
- L'home de neó (1991) - El profesor
- Un plaer indescriptible (1992) - Carpena
- Ciudad Baja (Downtown Heat) (1994) - Vagabond
- Tiempos mejores (1994) - Taxista
- Quince (1998) - Quitamal
- Ten Days Without Love (2001) - Abuelo Jazmina
- Mi casa es tu casa (2002) - Jordi
- Vivancos 3 (2002) - Borracho
- Cásate conmigo, Maribel (2002) - Don Manuel
- Goya's Ghosts (2006) - Money Monk
- Sitges-Nagasaki (2007) - Doctor
