= Dario Sabatello =

Italian film producer

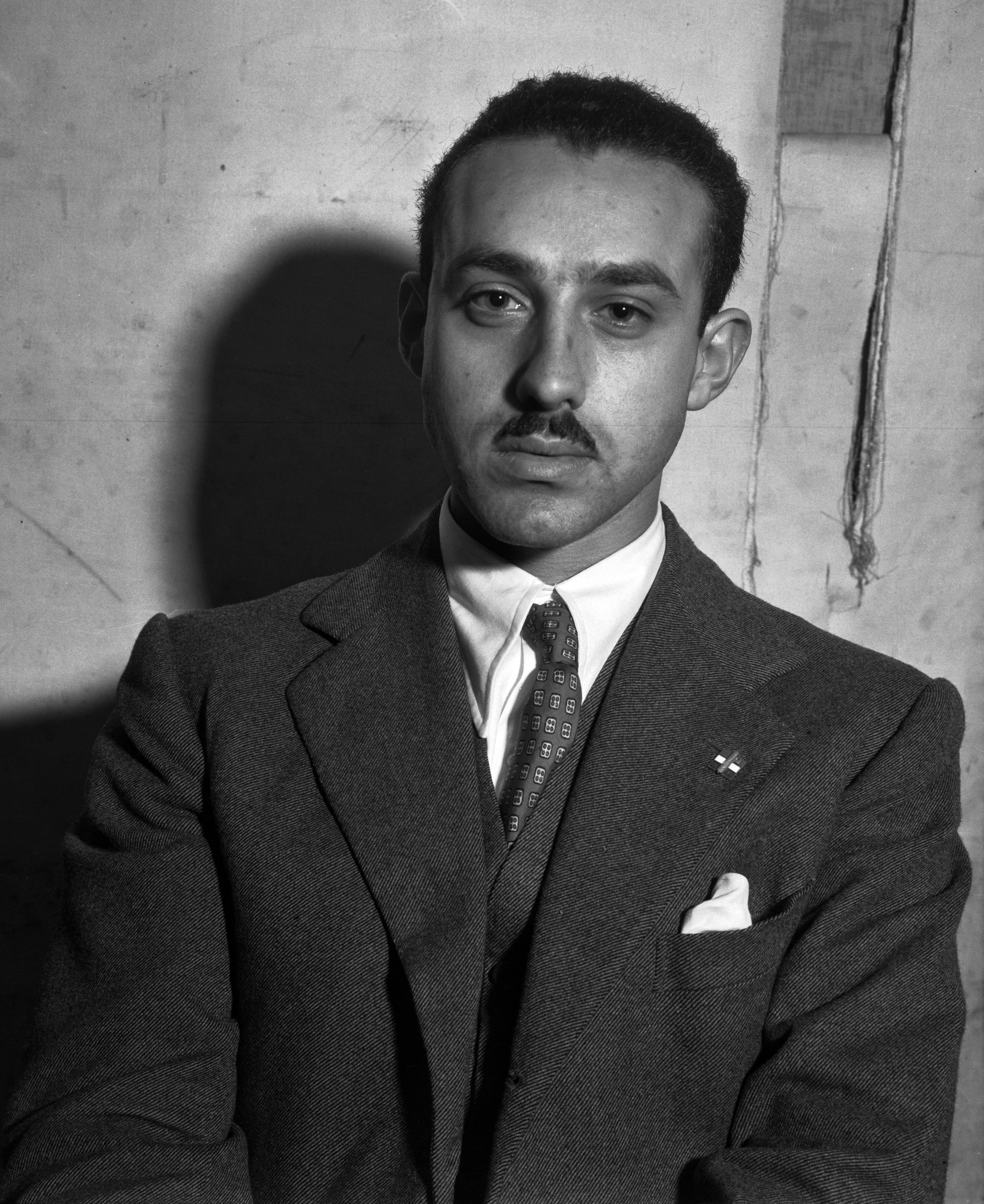
- Sabatello in 1933
- Born: 26 October 1911; Rome, Lazio, Italy
- Died: 10 March 1992 (aged 80); Rome
- Occupation: Producer
- Years active: 1946-1974 (film)

Dario Sabatello (1911–1992) was an Italian film producer. He was married to the actress Agata Flori.

== Biography ==
Sabatello worked as a journalist and an art critic for Il Tevere, the newspaper founded by Benito Mussolini in December 1924. From 1932 to 1934 he had his own art gallery in Rome. The Jewish Sabatello was removed from his position after punching Giuseppe Pensabene who made anti-Jewish remarks. He transferred his talents to dealing in art.

He worked as a technical advisor on the 1946 American film The Beast with Five Fingers before entering film production three years later, beginning as an associate producer on Black Magic (1949) that was shot in Italy using frozen funds.

During the 1960s he made a series of Spaghetti Westerns, the Eurospy film Operation Kid Brother and a Tarzan film Tarzan and the Brown Prince (1972); many of these films featured Agata Flori.

== Selected filmography ==
- Black Magic (1949)
- Shadow of the Eagle (1950)
- The Thief of Venice (1950)
- The Rival of the Empress (1951)
- Era lui... sì! sì! (1951)
- The Enchanting Enemy (1953)
- The Count of Bragelonne (1954)
- Sins of Casanova (1955)
- The Lady Doctor (1957)
- Love, the Italian Way (1960)
- Le olimpiadi dei mariti (1960)
- The Swindlers (1963)
- The Twelve-Handed Men of Mars (1964)
- Le repas des fauves (1964)
- Seven Guns for the MacGregors (1966)
- Up the MacGregors! (1967)
- O.K. Connery (1967)
- One Dollar Too Many (1968)
- Tarzan and the Brown Prince (1972)
- Return of Halleluja (1972)
- Pasqualino Cammarata, Frigate Captain (1974)

== Bibliography ==
- Paietta, Ann & Kauppila, Jean. Health Professionals on Screen. Scarecrow Press, 1999.
