= Neil Connery =

Scottish actor (1938–2021)

- Connery in The Body Stealers (1969)
- Born: Neil Niren Connery; 16 December 1938; Edinburgh, Scotland
- Died: 9 May 2021 (aged 82); Edinburgh, Scotland
- Occupations: Actor; plasterer
- Years active: 1967–1996
- Spouse: Eleanor Connery
- Children: 2
- Relatives: Sean Connery (brother); Jason Connery (nephew)

Neil Niren Connery (16 December 1938 – 9 May 2021) was a Scottish plasterer and occasional actor. He was the younger brother of actor Sean Connery.

== Early life ==
Connery was born in Edinburgh, Scotland. The Connery family is of partial Irish origin. His father, Joseph Connery, was a lorry driver; and his mother, Euphemia (Effie) McLean, worked as a cleaner. Connery had a modest upbringing in Fountainbridge, a deprived area of Edinburgh.

== Career ==
Connery's film debut was in O.K. Connery (1967), a James Bond-inspired film. The film was retitled Operation Kid Brother in the United States and is also known as Operation Double 007. It became known for having a number of the original James Bond series actors appearing as similar characters. O.K. Connery was featured in Mystery Science Theater 3000 (1998) under its alternative title, Operation Double 007.

In 1969, Connery appeared in the science fiction film The Body Stealers, also known as Thin Air, where he played Jim Radford, an investigator trying to figure out why paratroopers are disappearing in mid-air.

In 1980, Connery appeared as a guest star in the British television series Only When I Laugh. He also played in the 7th episode ("Last Tango") from the second season.

For most of his life, Connery worked as a plasterer, until he broke his pelvis falling off a ladder in 1983 ending his career.

== Personal life ==
Connery was married to Eleanor, with whom he had two daughters.

Six months after his elder brother Sean died, Connery died on 9 May 2021, aged 82, from a short illness.

== Filmography ==
- O.K. Connery (1967) as Dr. Neil Connery (film debut)
- The Body Stealers (1969) as Jim Radford
