= Scorticateli vivi =

- Original movie poster
- Directed by: Mario Siciliano
- Written by: Amedeo Mellone; Mario Siciliano
- Produced by: Mario Siciliano
- Starring: Bryan Rostron; Mario Novelli; Karin Well; Charles Borromel
- Cinematography: Gino Santini
- Music by: Stelvio Cipriani
- Release date: 1978
- Running time: 95 minutes
- Country: Italy

Scorticateli vivi also known as Skin 'em Alive and The Wild Geese Attack Again is a 1978 Italian Macaroni combat film about a fictional group of mercenaries in Africa. The film was co-written, produced and directed by screenwriter Mario Siciliano that was inspired by the international success of The Wild Geese. The film features extensive reuse of action footage from Siciliano's 1969 mercenary film Seven Red Berets. The film stars South African journalist Bryan Torquil Rostron in his final film appearance. Despite the title, none of the characters are skinned alive in the film.

== Plot ==
Rudy, a young man from an unnamed European nation is beaten up by gangsters and threatened with death if he does not pay his debts. Rudy uses deceit to gain enough money to join his half brother Colonel Franz Kṻbler who leads a pack of mercenaries in an unnamed African nation. Rudy finds himself joining the mercenaries to rescue his brother and claim a share of diamonds.
