= Alleluja & Sartana are Sons... Sons of God =

1972 film by Mario Siciliano

- Spanish theatrical poster
- Directed by: Mario Siciliano
- Written by: Adriano Bolzoni
- Produced by: Mario Siciliano; Otto Retzer
- Starring: Ron Ely; Alberto dell'Acqua; Uschi Glas
- Cinematography: Gino Santini
- Edited by: Giancarlo Venarucci; Eva Seyn
- Music by: Elvio Monti; Fausto Zauli
- Release date: 22 December 1972 (Italy)
- Countries: Italy; West Germany
- Language: Italian

Alleluja & Sartana are Sons... Sons of God (Italian: Alleluja e Sartana figli di... Dio, German: 100 Fäuste und ein Vaterunser, lit. '100 Fists and a Prayer') is an Italian-West German Spaghetti Western film directed by Mario Siciliano. It was released in 1972.

== Cast ==
- Ron Ely as Allaluja
- Alberto dell'Acqua as Sartana
- Uschi Glas as Mrs. Gibbons
- Angelika Ott as Therese
- Dan van Husen as Olsen
- Ezio Marano as Le Loup (credited as Alan Abbott)
- Dante Maggio as The General
- Stelio Candelli as "Falco"
- Enzo Andronico as Father O'Connor
- Lars Bloch as The Danish
- Carla Mancini as Julia
- Furio Meniconi as A Citizen of Mossville
- Mimì Maggio as A Wolf Hunter
