= Robin Aristorenas =

Filipino actor

- Born: 1964 (age 60–61)
- Occupation: Actor
- Years active: 1972–1984

Robin Gaerlan Aristorenas (born 1964) is a Filipino former "Child Wonder" known for his role as Robin.

Born in 1964, Aristorenas is the eldest son of actor Jun Aristorenas and actress Virginia. He is also the brother of Peter Aristorenas who made their first and last movie together with their father in 1977 movie under Junar Production, Mga Anak ni Harabas.

Aristorenas now is living in the United Kingdom with his family.

== Filmography ==
- 1972 - Batman & Robin
- 1972 - Central Luzon
- 1972 - Tarzan and the Brown Prince
- 1977 - Mga Anak ni Harabas
- 1981 - Estong Balisong
