= Marisa Bartoli =

Italian actress (1942–2024)

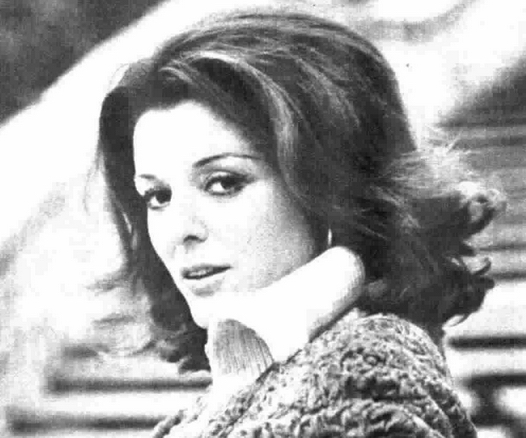
- Marisa Bartoli in 1973
- Born: 10 November 1942; Pola, Italy
- Died: 26 October 2024 (aged 81); Trieste, Italy
- Occupation: Actress

Marisa Bartoli (10 November 1942 – 26 October 2024) was an Italian actress.

== Life and career ==
Bartoli was the daughter of Gianni Bartoli who was a mayor of Trieste. After Bartoli attended drama school in Trieste, she was engaged at the local Teatro Stabile. In Rome, after graduating from the Accademia d'Arte Drammatica, television offered her her first role in the crime thriller La sciarpa, directed by Guglielmo Morandi. She remained mainly a television actress in her career, where she starred in numerous crime series (Vivere insieme, Le inchieste del commissario Maigret, I gialli di Nero Wolfe) and other series during the 1960s; her most notable role was in Franco Rossi's Eneide in 1971. In addition to stage and radio work, she also appeared in a handful of film roles between 1969 and 1974, including a version of her great success, Le avventure di Enea, in 1974.

Bartoli died on 27 October 2024, at the age of 81.

== Filmography ==
- 1963: La sciarpa (TV movie)
- 1968: La Bambolona – the big doll (La bambolona)
- 1971: The Angel of Death (La vittima designata)
- 1974: The Legend of Aeneas
- 1974: A Sweet Beast (La sculacciata)
