= Agata Flori =

Italian actress

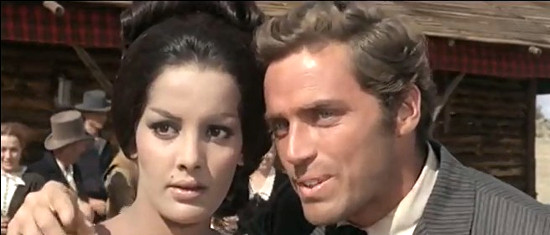
- Flori in Seven Guns for the MacGregors
- Born: 15 April 1938 (age 88); Tunis, French Tunisia
- Occupation: Actress
- Years active: 1964–1974 (film)

Agata Flori (born 1938) is an Italian former film actress. She starred in several spaghetti westerns during the 1960s and 1970s. She was married to the producer Dario Sabatello.

== Selected filmography ==
- Seven Guns for the MacGregors (1966)
- Up the MacGregors! (1967)
- O.K. Connery (1967)
- How to Kill 400 Duponts (1967)
- One Dollar Too Many (1968)
- The Nephews of Zorro (1968)
- They Call Me Hallelujah (1971)
- Return of Halleluja (1972)
- Pasqualino Cammarata, Frigate Captain (1974)

== Bibliography ==
- Hughes, Howard. Cinema Italiano: The Complete Guide from Classics to Cult. I.B.Tauris, 2011.
- Weisser, Thomas. Spaghetti Westerns: The Good, the Bad, and the Violent : a Comprehensive, Illustrated Filmography of 558 Eurowesterns and Their Personnel, 1961-1977. McFarland, 1992.
