= The Body Stealers =

1969 British film by Gerry Levy

- Theatrical release poster
- Directed by: Gerry Levy
- Written by: Michael St. Clair; Gerry Levy
- Produced by: Tony Tenser
- Starring: George Sanders; Maurice Evans; Patrick Allen
- Cinematography: John Coquillon
- Edited by: Howard Lanning
- Music by: Reg Tilsley
- Production company: Tigon British Film Productions
- Release date: 1969
- Running time: 91 minutes
- Country: United Kingdom

The Body Stealers, also known as Invasion of the Body Stealers and Thin Air, is a 1969 British science fiction film directed by Gerry Levy, and starring George Sanders and Maurice Evans. Two investigators uncover an alien plot to steal bodies of earthlings by snatching them out of the air.

== Plot ==
When British paratroopers disappear in mid-air during routine jumps, former air force investigator Bob Megan is brought in to solve the mystery. While making inquiries at a military research laboratory headed by Dr Matthews, he has several encounters with a woman called Lorna who vanishes after each meeting.

One of the troopers is found barely alive and dies on arrival at the laboratory. An autopsy performed by Dr Julie Slade reveals that the man's biochemistry had been altered. Megan learns that all of the missing troopers had received spaceflight training, leading Matthews to theorise that they are being adapted to survive in a non-Earth environment.

Travelling to Matthews' cottage, Slade discovers that the human Matthews has been killed and his form assumed by an alien called Marthus. When Megan arrives, Marthus explains that the troopers were abducted as part of a plan to re-populate his home planet, Mygon, which has been devastated by plague. Marthus attempts to kill Megan and Slade but is incapacitated by Lorna, who is revealed to be his alien companion. Lorna shows Megan the surviving troopers, who are being held in suspended animation, as well as her and Marthus' spacecraft. Megan asks Lorna to return the troopers in exchange for his promise to find a group of volunteers to assist her with the re-population. Lorna agrees and vanishes once again, taking Marthus and the spacecraft with her.

== Cast ==
- George Sanders as General Armstrong
- Maurice Evans as Dr Matthews and Marthus
- Patrick Allen as Bob Megan
- Neil Connery as Jim Radford
- Hilary Dwyer as Dr Julie Slade
- Robert Flemyng as Wing Commander Baldwin
- Lorna Wilde as Lorna
- Allan Cuthbertson as Hindesmith
- Michael Culver as Lieutenant Bailes
- Sally Faulkner as Joanna
- Shelagh Fraser as Mrs Thatcher
- Carl Rigg as Briggs
- Carol Hawkins as Paula
- Dixon Adams as David
- Derek Pollitt as Davies
- Johnnie Wade as Orderly
- Clifford Earl as Sergeant in laboratory

== Effects ==
The alien spacecraft is the Dalek flying saucer from the film Daleks' Invasion Earth 2150 A.D. (1966).

== Critical reception ==
The Monthly Film Bulletin said "As body-stealers, these aliens invite no comparison with Invasion of the Body Snatchers [1956]. The initial idea is promising, 'but it is soon buried under a mountain of sub-plots and unexplained mysterious happenings; and the feeble, talkative script gives the cast little chance to make much impression.

Alan Jones of Radio Times gave the film one star out of five, calling it a "talky, laughably low-budget and hopelessly inept clone of Invasion of the Body Snatchers".

Time Out described it as a "threadbare Anglo-American enterprise with too much vapid chat and too little action" that "[ends] very feebly (in a British sort of way)".
