= Bernard Lee on stage and screen =

Bernard Lee (1908–1981) was an English actor who performed in many light entertainment media, including film, television and theatre. His career spanned from 1934 to 1981, although he made his first appearance on the stage at the age of six. He is perhaps best known for playing M in the first eleven Eon-produced James Bond films.

Lee trained at the Royal Academy of Dramatic Art, before making his professional stage debut in 1924. He appeared on film for the first time in 1934 in the Leslie Howard Gordon-directed comedy The Double Event, where he played the part of Dennison. Although he was in wartime service with the Royal Sussex Regiment between 1940 and 1946, he had already been in several films, which were released between 1939 and 1943. He returned to acting after the war and was offered a role in the play Stage Door while awaiting his demob.

Lee appeared on stage and television dramatisations, as well as in more than 100 films. He was known for his roles as authority figures, often playing military characters, policemen or officials. Highlights in his career included The Third Man, The Blue Lamp, The Battle of the River Plate, Whistle Down the Wind and the James Bond series. Suffering from stomach cancer, Lee died in 1981; in his obituary The Guardian noted that Lee was a "solid and reliable character actor" who displayed "a rugged dependency".

== Stage ==
Known stage credits of Bernard Lee
Production	Date	Role	Theatre	Ref.
White Cargo	1926	Longford	UK tour	
The Ringer	20 February 1928 –	John Lenley	Hull Grand Theatre	
The Ringer	May 1928 –	John Lenley	Grand Theatre, Derby	
The Happy Ending	June 1928 –	—	Rusholme Theatre, Manchester	
East Lynne	25 May 1929 – 31 May 1929	Archibald Carlyle	Regent Theatre	
The Squeaker	9 November 1929 –	Captain Leslie	Regent Theatre	
Journey's End	1930	Captain Stanhope	UK tour	
A Pair of Silk Stockings	14 March 1930 –	—	Alexandra Theatre, Harwich	
The Whole Town's Talking	4 February 1931 –	—	Alexandra Hall, Dovercourt	
On the Spot	12 December 1931 –	Captain Perrelli	Regent Theatre	
The Case of the Frightened Lady	April 1932 –	Lord Lebanon	Regent Theatre	
Appearances	December 1932 –	Fred Kellard	Fortune Theatre	
Heritage	May 1933 –	Peter and Geoffrey Trail	Fortune Theatre	
Love for Sale	May 1933 –	Pip	Fortune Theatre	
Tudor Wench	October 1933 –	Sir John Harlington	Embassy Theatre	
The Terror	November 1933 –	Ferdinand Fane	Lyceum Theatre	
Take Heed!	28 January 1934 –	Roman	Piccadilly Theatre	
The Queen Who Kept Her Head	February 1934 –	Sir Thomas Seymour	Kingsway Theatre	
Without Witness	March 1934 –	Saunders	Duke of York's Theatre	
Murder in Motley	April 1934 –	—	Royalty Theatre	
Ten Minute Alibi	May 1934 –	Colin Derwent	Phoenix Theatre	
Root of all Evil	July 1934 –	—	St Martin's Theatre	
Murder in Motley	January 1935 –	Jimmy O'Bryan	Kingsway Theatre	
The Shadow Man	April 1935 –	Johnny Clayton	Piccadilly Theatre	
The Philanthropist	September 1935 –	Antoine Duval	Arts Theatre	
Distinguished Gathering	October 1935 –	Felix Montague	Embassy Theatre	
Murder Gang	November 1935 –	Walter Grainger	Embassy Theatre	
Red Night	March 1936 –	Private Whitman	Queen's Theatre, London	
The Future That Was	April 1936 –	Anthony Pittman and Ben Manassey	Ambassadors Theatre	
The Provoked Wife	October 1936 –	Heartfree	Embassy Theatre	
Young Madam Conti	November 1936 –	Stephen Horka	Savoy Theatre	
And the Music Stopped	1937 –	—	Streatham Hill Theatre	
Night Sky	January 1937 –	Ray Dawson	Savoy Theatre	
Tavern in the Town	February 1937 –	—	Embassy Theatre	
Young Madam Conti	31 March 1937 –	—	Music Box Theatre, New York	
And the Music Stopped	May 1937 –	Detective-Inspector Kinneir	New Theatre	
The Gusher	July 1937 –	Clarence, the Dodger	Prince's Theatre	
If I Were You	24 January 1938 – 1 February 1938	Arthur Blunt	Mansfield Theatre, New York	
People of Our Class	April 1938 –	Henry Hayes	Manchester Opera House	
People of Our Class	May 1938 –	Henry Hayes	New Theatre	
Blind Man's Buff	23 September 1938 –	Dr. Chavesse	Arts Theatre	
Number Six	December 1938 –	Franklyn Dyall	Aldwych Theatre	
Without Motive?	June 1939 –	Hayland Marlow	Richmond Theatre	
The Long Mirror	February 1940 –	—	Haymarket Theatre	
The Long Mirror	March 1940 –	Michael Camber	Oxford Playhouse	
Penny Wise	June 1940 –	Gordon	Richmond Theatre	
Stage Door	February 1946 –	David Kingsley	Saville Theatre	
Fools Rush In	June 1946 –	Paul	UK tour	
Fools Rush In	September 1946 –	Paul	Fortune Theatre	
Peace in Our Time	July 1947 –	Fred Shattock	Lyric Theatre	
Seagulls Over Sorrento	June 1950 –	Seaman "Lofty" Turner	Apollo Theatre	
The Desperate Hours	April 1955 –	Dan Hilliard	Hippodrome Theatre	
Act of Violence	October 1962 –	—	St Martin's Theatre, and subsequent UK tour	
Norman	April 1963 –	Charlie	Royal Court Theatre, Liverpool	
Norman	20 May 1963 –	Charlie	Duchess Theatre	
The Farm	26 September 1973 – 27 October 1973	Mr Slattery	Royal Court Theatre	
The Farm	1 November 1973 – 8 December 1973	Mr Slattery	Mayfair Theatre	
Jingo	August 1975 –	Bernard	Aldwych Theatre	

- ^1 There is no evidence available to help with end dates for the productions.

== Filmography ==
Filmography of Bernard Lee^{[1]}
Film	Year	Role	Notes
The Double Event	1934	Dennison	
The River House Mystery	1935	Wade Belloc	
Rhodes of Africa	1936	Cartwright	
Love from a Stranger	1937	Cast Member	Uncredited
The Black Tulip	1937	William of Orange	
The Terror	1938	Ferdy Fane	
Murder in Soho	1939	Roy Barnes	
The Frozen Limits	1939	Bill McGrew	
Let George Do It!	1940	Oscar	US title To Hell with Hitler
Spare a Copper	1940	Jake	
Once a Crook	1941	The Duke	
The New Lot	1943	Interviewing Officer	Uncredited
This Man Is Mine	1946	James Nicholls	
The Courtneys of Curzon Street	1947	Colonel Gascoyne	US title Kathy's Love Affair
Dusty Bates	1947	Captain Ford	US title The Adventures of Dusty Bates
The Fallen Idol	1948	Detective Hart	
Quartet	1948	Ned Preston, Prison Visitor	(segment "The Kite")
Elizabeth of Ladymead	1948	John Beresford in 1903	
The Third Man	1949	Sergeant Paine	
The Blue Lamp	1950	Inspector Cherry	
Morning Departure	1950	Commander Gates	US title Operation Disaster
Last Holiday	1950	Inspector Wilton	
Odette	1950	Jack	
Cage of Gold	1950	Inspector Grey	
The Adventurers	1951	Jack O'Connell	US title Fortune in Diamonds
White Corridors	1951	Burgess	
Calling Bulldog Drummond	1951	Colonel Webson	
Appointment with Venus	1951	Brigadier	US title Island Rescue
Mr. Denning Drives North	1951	Inspector Dodds	
Gift Horse	1952	Able Seaman 'Stripey' Wood	US title Glory at Sea
The Yellow Balloon	1953	Constable Chapman	
Single-Handed	1953	Petty Officer 'Stokes' Wheatley	US title C.S. Forester's Sailor of the King
Beat the Devil	1953	Inspector Jack Clayton	
The Rainbow Jacket	1954	Racketeer	Uncredited
Father Brown	1954	Inspector Valentine	US title The Detective
Seagulls Over Sorrento	1954	Seaman 'Lofty' Turner	US title Crest of the Wave
The Purple Plain	1954	Doctor Harris	
Out of the Clouds	1955	Customs Officer	
The Ship That Died of Shame	1955	Sam Brewster	US title PT Raiders
The Battle of the River Plate	1956	Captain Dove—M.S. Africa Shell	US title Pursuit of the Graf Spee
The Spanish Gardener	1956	Leighton Bailey	
Fire Down Below	1957	Doctor Sam Blake	
Across the Bridge	1957	Chief Inspector Hadden	
High Flight	1957	Flight Sergeant Harris	
Dunkirk	1958	Charles Foreman	
The Key	1958	Commander Wadlow	
The Man Upstairs	1958	Inspector Thompson	
Nowhere to Go	1958	Victor Sloane, alias Lee Henderson	
Kidnapped	1959	Captain Hoseason	
Danger Within	1959	Lieutenant-Colonel Huxley	US title Breakout
Beyond This Place	1959	Patrick Mathry	US title Web of Evidence
Clue of the Twisted Candle	1960	Superintendent Meredith	
Sink the Bismarck!	1960	Firing Officer	Uncredited
The Angry Silence	1960	Bert Connolly	
Cone of Silence	1960	Captain George Gort	US title Trouble in the Sky
Partners in Crime	1961	Inspector Mann	
Clue of the Silver Key	1961	Superintendent Meredith	
Fury at Smugglers' Bay	1961	Black John	
The Secret Partner	1961	Superintendent Frank Hanbury	
Whistle Down the Wind	1961	Mr Bostock	
The Share Out	1962	Superintendent Meredith	
Dr. No	1962	M	
The Brain	1962	Doctor Frank Shears	
The L-Shaped Room	1962	Charlie	
From Russia with Love	1963	M	
Ring of Spies	1964	Henry Houghton	US Title Ring of Treason
Saturday Night Out	1964	George Hudson	
A Place to Go	1964	Matt Flint	
Goldfinger	1964	M	
Dr. Terror's House of Horrors	1965	Hopkins	(segment "Creeping Vine")
Two Left Feet	1965	Mr Crabbe	
The Spy Who Came In from the Cold	1965	Patmore	
The Legend of Young Dick Turpin	1965	Jeremiah	
The Amorous Adventures of Moll Flanders	1965	Landlord	Uncredited
Thunderball	1965	M	
O.K. Connery	1967	Commander Cunningham	(Bond Parody) US title Operation Kid Brother
You Only Live Twice	1967	M	
Journey to Midnight	1968	Ben Loker	(episode 'Poor Butterfly')
Crossplot	1969	Chilmore	
On Her Majesty's Secret Service	1969	M	
The Raging Moon	1971	Uncle Bob	US title Long Ago, Tomorrow
Dulcima	1971	Mr Gaskain	
Diamonds Are Forever	1971	M	
Danger Point	1971	Captain	
Live and Let Die	1973	M	
Frankenstein and the Monster from Hell	1974	Tarmut	
Percy's Progress	1974	Barraclough	US title It's Not the Size That Counts
The Man with the Golden Gun	1974	M	
Bons Baisers de Hong Kong	1975	David Marton	(Bond Parody) Also known as From Hong Kong with Love
The Spy Who Loved Me	1977	M	
Moonraker	1979	M	

- ^1 The 1958 British Film and Television Yearbook also lists Lee as appearing in an undated film The Outsider, although it does not say whether this uncredited role was in the 1931 or 1939 film of that name. The 1942 International Motion Picture Almanac claims Lee appeared in The Tunnel (for Gaumont-British), Secret Agent (for Gaumont-British) and The Terror (for Alliance); this last is almost certainly the 1940 U.S. release of the 1938 British film listed above.

== Television ==
Bernard Lee's television appearances
Programme	Date	Role	Channel	Notes	Ref.
Television Playhouse, "The Golden Fleece"	31 December 1955	William Lotless	ITV	Television production of a J. B. Priestley play	
Theatre Royal, "The Stolen Pearl"	8 January 1956	Candleblow Smith	ITV		
Douglas Fairbanks, Jr., Presents, "A Borderline Case"	30 October 1956	Rudi Lankert	ITV		
Playdate, "All Correct, Sir"	13 December 1956	Cast Member	ITV		
Television Playhouse: Cornelius	18 July 1958	Cornelius	ITV	Television production of a J. B. Priestley play	
Armchair Theatre, "Ernie Barger is 50"	8 February 1959	Ernie Barger	ITV		
Play of the Week, "Family on Trial"	21 April 1959	Detective Inspector Lunt	ITV		
Sunday Night Theatre, "Crime Passionnel"	20 September 1959	Hoederer	BBC Television	Television production of a Jean-Paul Sartre play	
Armchair Theatre, "Cold Fury"	31 January 1960	Aaronson	ITV		
Armchair Theatre, "Nest of Four"	15 May 1960	Tom	ITV		
The Interrogator	22 December 1961	Superintendent Farron	BBC Television		
The Third Man, "Portrait of Harry"	18 May 1963	Angus Meyrick	BBC Television		
Who Was Maddox?	1964	Superintendent Meredith	ITV	Television production of an Edgar Wallace thriller	
Espionage, "Snow on Mount Kama"	15 February 1964	John Neary	ITV		
Thursday Theatre, "Flowering Cherry"	7 January 1965	Jim Cherry	BBC Two		
Danger Man, "Whatever Happened To George Foster?"	30 January 1965	Lord Ammanford	ITV		
The Human Jungle, "Ring of Hate"	18 March 1965	Jim Garner	ITV		
Thirty-Minute Theatre, "The Passenger"	30 December 1965	The Man	BBC Two		
Danger Man, "The Man with the Foot"	3 March 1966	Derringham	ITV		
Armchair Theatre, "The Night Before the Morning After"	2 April 1966	Daniel Whittaker	ITV		
King of the River	6 July 1966	Joss King	BBC One		
The Baron, "Masquerade"	15 October 1966	Morgan Travis	ITV	Part 1 of a 2-part story: part 2 is called "The Killing"	
Talking to a Stranger	October 1966	—	BBC Two	Four-part series	
The Baron, "The Killing"	22 October 1966	Morgan Travis	ITV	Part 2 of a 2-part story: part 1 is called "Masquerade"	
Half-Hour Story, "Friends"	6 September 1967	Frank	ITV		
Man in a Suitcase, "Girl Who Never Was"	25 November 1967	Kershaw	ITV		
The Gamblers: The Man Beneath	7 December 1967	Bob Townsend	–		
The Jazz Age: Post Mortem	17 September 1968	Sir James	BBC Two	Television production of the Noël Coward play Post-Mortem	
The System: Them Down There	24 September 1968	Baxter	ITV		
The Wednesday Play, "Nothing Will Be The Same Again"	6 November 1968	Frank Lanton	BBC One		
Journey to the Unknown: Poor Butterfly	1969	Loker	ABC	Also broadcast on ITV 19 May 1969	
The Expert, "Post-Mortem on Harry Kirby"	13 July 1969	Harry Kirby	BBC Two		
The Persuaders!, "Someone Like Me"	29 October 1971	Sam Milford	ITV		
Pathfinders, "Codename Gomorrah"	13 December 1972	Air Vice-Marshal	ITV		
The Man Who Died Twice	13 April 1973	Cast Member	–	First broadcast in the USA	
Once Upon a Time: Silver	12 August 1973	James Cable	ITV	Based on the Robert Louis Stevenson story Treasure Island	
Crime of Passion: Emile	10 September 1973	Marcel Amiot	ITV		
Vienna 1900 Games With Love And Death: Story 1 Mother And Son	8 December 1973	Herr Welponer	BBC Two		
Play of the Month, "The Skin Game"	19 May 1974	Hornblower	BBC One	Television production of a John Galsworthy play	
Father Brown: The Quick One	21 November 1974	John Raggley	ITV	Based on G. K. Chesterton's Father Brown stories	
Play of the Month, "The School for Scandal"	2 February 1975	Cast Member	BBC One	Based on The School for Scandal, by Richard Brinsley Sheridan	
Affairs of the Heart: Kate	9 March 1975	Mr Drury	ITV		
Against The Crowd: Murrain	27 July 1975	Beeley	ITV		
What A Turn Up	7 August 1975	Cast Member	ITV		
Warship, "Knight Errant"	20 January 1976	Yachtsman	BBC One		
Killers: The Chalkpit Murder	25 August 1976	Thomas Ley	ITV		
Hallmark Hall of Fame, "Beauty and the Beast"	3 December 1976	Beaumont	NBC	US television production	
The Foundation: Business Not Quite As Usual	1977	Cast Member	ITV	Nine-part television series	
A Christmas Carol Being a Ghost Story of Christmas	24 December 1977	Ghost of Christmas Present	BBC Two		
Saint Joan	30 December 1979	Monseigneur de la Trémouille, Lord Chamberlain	BBC One	Television production of a George Bernard Shaw play	
Star Games	4 November 1980	On-screen Participant	ITV		
Dangerous Davies – The Last Detective	4 January 1981	Sergeant Ben	ITV	Part of the Dangerous Davies series	

== Bibliography ==
- Aldgate, Anthony; Richards, Jeffrey (2007). Britain can take it: British cinema in the Second World War. London: I.B. Tauris. ISBN 978-1-84511-445-9.
- Bolton, H. Philip (2000). Women Writers Dramatized: A Calendar of Performances from Narrative Works Published in English to 1900. Continuum International Publishing Group. ISBN 978-0-7201-2117-9.
- British Film and Television Yearbook. British and American Film Press. 1956.
- Gifford, Denis (1986). The British film catalogue 1895–1985: a reference guide. London: David & Charles Plc. ISBN 978-0-7153-8835-8.
- Guernsey, Otis L., ed. (1974). The Best Plays of 1973–1974. Dodd, Mead and Company. ISBN 9780396070177.
- Halliwell, Leslie (1987). Halliwell's film guide. London: Scribner. ISBN 978-0-684-18826-3.
- International Motion Picture Almanac. Groton, MA: Quigley Publishing Company. 1942.
- Kabatchnik, Amnon (2010). Blood on the Stage, 1925–1950: Milestone Plays of Crime, Mystery and Detection. Plymouth, Devon: Scarecrow Press. ISBN 978-0-8108-6963-9.
- Kabatchnik, Amnon (2011). Blood on the Stage, 1950–1975: Milestone Plays of Crime, Mystery and Detection: An Annotated Repertoire. Plymouth, Devon: Scarecrow Press. ISBN 978-0-8108-7783-2.
- Katz, Ephraim (1979). The film encyclopaedia. New York: Crowell. ISBN 978-0-690-01204-0.
- Klunder, Achim, ed. (1991). Lexikon der Fernsehspiele / Encyclopedia of television plays in German speaking Europe. 1978/87. Berlin: Walter de Gruyter. ISBN 978-3-11-141194-1.
- Lloyd, Ann; Fuller, Graham; Desser, Arnold (1983). The Illustrated who's who of the cinema. London: Orbis Publishing. ISBN 978-0-85613-521-7.
- McFarlane, Brian (2005). The encyclopaedia of British film. London: Methuen Publishing. ISBN 978-0-413-77526-9.
- Nowlan, Robert A.; Wright Nowlan, Gwendolyn (1991). The films of the eighties. Jefferson: McFarland & Company. ISBN 978-0-89950-560-2.
- Parker, John (1981). Who's Who in the Theatre. London: Pitman Books.
- Pettigrew, Terence (1982). British film character actors: great names and memorable moments. Rowman & Littlefield. ISBN 978-0-7153-8270-7.
- Quinlan, David (1998). The film lover's companion: an A to Z guide to 2,000 stars and the movies they made. New York: Carol Publishing Group. ISBN 978-0-8065-1892-3.
- Slide, Anthony (1998). 'Banned in the USA': British films in the United States and their censorship, 1933–1960. London: I.B. Tauris. ISBN 978-1-86064-254-8.
- Smith, Jim; Lavington, Stephen (2002). Bond films. London: Virgin Books. ISBN 978-0-7535-0709-4.
- Stephens, Frances, ed. (1963). Theatre World Annual (London): A Pictorial Review of West End Productions with a Record of Plays and Players. Rockliff.
