= The Seven Red Berets =

Sette baschi rossi
- Original movie poster
- Directed by: Mario Siciliano
- Written by: Piero Regnoli (novel); August Rieger
- Produced by: Mario Siciliano
- Starring: Ivan Rassimov; Sieghardt Rupp; Kirk Morris; Serge Nubret; Robert Cummings Jr. Priscilla Drake
- Cinematography: Gino Santini
- Music by: Gianni Marchetti
- Release date: 1969
- Running time: 90 m
- Countries: Italy; West Germany

Sette baschi rossi also known as The Red Berets, Seven Red Berets and Congo Hell is a 1969 Italian/West German co-production, filmed in Ethiopia, about a fictional group of mercenaries. The film was produced and directed by screenwriter Mario Siciliano in his debut as a director. It was based on the novel Rebellion by Piero Regnoli, under his pen name Dean Craig.

== Plot ==
Set during the Simba rebellion, during the Congo Crisis, the film begins with a quote from Martin Luther King Jr., the spearing executions of a group of captured mercenaries, and the gang rape of a French female journalist.

At Mercenary Central an angry Colonel Kimber rebukes the only survivor of the incident, German Captain De Brand. De Brand has left important documents in the Simba village that contains information on the activities and employers of the mercenaries. The documents must be retrieved within four days. De Brand says he can recover the papers and rescue the captured journalist with a small patrol. The Colonel agrees, but informs De Brand that his record of performance clearly shows he is incapable of leadership, and appoints African-American Captain Lauderwood to lead the patrol.

Kimber adds three men to the patrol: a German Field Commander, a black African named Martinez and an Irishman named O'Fearn. As the patrol is unfamiliar with a swamp and desert they have to cross, Lauderwood recruits Carrès, a French gunrunner, for the fee of $15,000. Carrès is familiar with the area as he has sold weapons to the Simbas. Carrès became a weapons salesman after witnessing the torture of his wife who was burned and beaten to death in front of him. He became further alienated when the French government did not want to antagonise the local situation by seeking their prosecution. Lauderwood also takes along Wooder, a female mercenary doctor.

== Cast ==
- Ivan Rassimov as Alain Carrès
- Sieghardt Rupp as Vlasky
- Kirk Morris as O'Fearn
- Robert Cummings Jr. as Colonel Schroeder
- Serge Nubret as Captain Lauderwood
- Pamela Tudor as Mary Wooder
- Arthur Brauss as De Brand
- Wilbert Gurley as Martinez
- Angelica Ott as Journalist
- Gino Marturano as Field Commander

Note: the pairings of actor-to-role at IMDB and BFI are not in complete agreement

== Production trivia ==
- Marturano also acted as the film's armourer and stunt director.
- Several of the action set pieces of the film were reused in Siciliano's 1978 Scorticateli vivi (Skin 'em Alive).
- Like the 1968 film Dark of the Sun, also about mercenaries fighting in the Congo Crisis, The Seven Red Berets features a train sequence.
