= Leo Anchóriz =

Spanish actor and writer

- Born: Leopoldo de Anchóriz Fustel; September 22, 1932; Almería, Spain
- Died: February 17, 1987 (aged 54); Madrid, Spain
- Other names: Leo Anchóriz
- Occupations: Actor and writer
- Years active: 1957–1976

Leopoldo de Anchóriz Fustel (September 22, 1932 – February 17, 1987) was a Spanish actor and writer, most notable for appearing in spaghetti Westerns.

== Biography ==
Fustel was born in Almería, Spain on 22 September 1932. His real name was Leopoldo Anchóriz Fustel, but his stage name 'Leo Anchóriz' was instead used in films, appearing in some credits in English as 'Leo Anchoris'. He was also great friends with José María Forqué and Jaime de Armiñán, with whom he collaborated on several films, either as an actor or as a screenwriter.

In 1965, he married María Callejón.

He died on 17 February 1987 from a cardiac disease aged 54.

== Filmography ==
He specialised in Spaghetti Western films filmed in Almería, in the 1960s and 1970s, but he also worked in various other Spanish films and television series. He also worked at the same time as a screenwriter and as an artistic director.

He has worked with directors such as José María Forqué and Italian directors Sergio Corbucci, Enzo Castellari, Franco Giraldi and Umberto Lenzi.

Throughout his film career, he has shared the screen with Agustín González, María Asquerino, Marisol, Sara Montiel and Vittorio Gassman.

- 1957: The Girls in Blue - Carlos - novio de Pilar
- 1957: K.O. Miguel - Carlos
- 1958: El inquilino - Inspector
- 1959: Duelo en la cañada - Ramon
- 1961: The Invincible Gladiator - Prime Minister Rabirus
- 1962: Milagro a los cobardes
- 1962: The Balcony of the Moon
- 1962: The Legion's Last Patrol - Garcia
- 1963: Perseo l'invincibile - Galenore
- 1963: La cuarta ventana - Carlos
- 1963: The Blancheville Monster - Doctor LaRouche
- 1963: El juego de la verdad
- 1963: Noches de Casablanca - Lucien
- 1963: Sandokan, la tigre di Mompracem - Lord Guillonk
- 1964: I pirati della Malesia - Lord Brook
- 1965: Finger on the Trigger - Ed Bannister
- 1965: Umorismo in nero - Gayton - segment 2 'La Mandrilla - Miss Wilma'
- 1966: Seven Guns for the MacGregors - Santillana
- 1967: Up the MacGregors! - Maldonado
- 1968: I tre che sconvolsero il West - Garrito Lopez
- 1968: Kill Them All and Come Back Alone - Deker
- 1969: Carola de día, Carola de noche - Comisario
- 1969: El escuadrón del pánico
- 1969: A Bullet for Sandoval - Friar
- 1970: Viva Cangaceiro - Colonel Minas
- 1970: What Am I Doing in the Middle of the Revolution? - Carrasco
- 1973: The Three Musketeers of the West - Aramirez
- 1975: Cipolla Colt - Sheriff
