= One Dollar Too Many =

1968 film

- Italian: I tre che sconvolsero il West
- Directed by: Enzo G. Castellari
- Screenplay by: Augusto Finocchi; Vittorio Metz; José Maria Rodriguez; Enrique Llovet
- Story by: Augusto Finocchi; Vittorio Metz
- Produced by: Dario Sabatello
- Starring: Antonio Sabàto; John Saxon; Frank Wolff; Agata Flori
- Cinematography: Alejandro Ulloa
- Edited by: Tatiana Casini
- Music by: Carlo Rustichelli
- Production companies: Produzione D.S.; Aspa Films
- Distributed by: Titanus
- Release date: 1968
- Countries: Italy; Spain
- Languages: Italian; English

One Dollar Too Many (Italian: I tre che sconvolsero il West [Vado, vedo e sparo], lit. 'The three who shook the West [I go, I see and I shoot]') is a 1968 Spaghetti Western feature film directed by Enzo G. Castellari and starring Antonio Sabàto, John Saxon, and Frank Wolff.

== Plot summary ==
Sabàto, Wolff, and Saxon are three different types of con men out to get a bag full of money stolen from a bank.

== Cast ==
- Antonio Sabato as Moses Lang
- John Saxon as Clay Watson
- Frank Wolff as Edwin Kean
- Agata Flori as Rosario Fuentes
- Leo Anchóriz as Garrito Lopez
- Antonio Vico as Jeremias Casey
- Rossella Bergamonti as Hotel Receptionist
- Tito García as Corpulent member of Garrito's horde
- Edi Biagetti as Mr. Baker

== Production ==
Director Enzo G. Castellari described One Dollar Too Many as "a true slapstick with an abundance of stuntment, exaggerated action and three important actors: John Saxon, who I finally got to meet, Frank Wolff and Antonio Sabato. Castellari specifically noted Saxon stating that both had similar tastes such as a love of art and that they both had "attended the Accademeia delle Belle Arti [Academy of Fine Arts] in Rome" where Castellari got his diploma. Saxon made several Westerns during the 1960s.

Castellari stated that the only issue he had with the film was Agata Flori as the female lead, as she was cast by producer Dario Sabatello, her lover at the time.

== Release ==
One Dollar Too Many was first distributed in 1968. It was distributed by Titanus in Italy.
