= Pasqualino Cammarata, Frigate Captain =

1974 film

- Directed by: Mario Amendola
- Written by: Federico Fellini (idea); Mario Amendola; Bruno Corbucci; José Luis Piqueras
- Produced by: Dario Sabatello
- Starring: Aldo Giuffrè; Agata Flori; Ninetto Davoli
- Cinematography: Francisco Marín
- Edited by: Daniele Alabiso
- Music by: Renato Serio
- Production companies: Colosseo Artistica; Hesperia Films
- Distributed by: Delta Film; Mercurio Films
- Release date: 18 April 1974
- Running time: 90 minutes
- Countries: Italy; Spain
- Language: Italian

Pasqualino Cammarata, Frigate Captain (Italian: Pasqualino Cammarata... capitano di fregata) is a 1974 Italian-Spanish comedy film directed by Mario Amendola and starring Aldo Giuffrè, Agata Flori and Ninetto Davoli.

The film's sets were designed by the art director Adolfo Cofiño.

== Cast ==
- Aldo Giuffrè as Pasqualino Cammarata
- Agata Flori as Dolores
- Ninetto Davoli as Otello Meniconi
- Tano Cimarosa as Patanò
- José Sacristán as Gianni Cuocolo
- Ágata Lys as Novella Ferraris
- Stefano Amato as Stefano Peluso
- Mario Carotenuto as Ammiraglio Santi
- Ricardo Palacios
- Lara Sanders
- Manuel de Benito
- Leonardo Scavino
- Lucia Modugno
- Renato Baldini
- Iwao Yoshioka
- Luigi Bonos
- Sergio Bianchini
- José Jaspe
- Dante Cleri
- Luigi Antonio Guerra
- Maria Desta Birrù
- Lucia Righi
- Carla Mancini as Gypsie
- Sal Borgese

== Bibliography ==
- Poppi, Roberto. I registi: dal 1930 ai giorni nostri. Gremese Editore, 2002.
