= Dick Turpin (1974 film) =

- Directed by: Fernando Merino
- Written by: José Truchado; Fernando Merino; Ricardo Palacios
- Starring: Cihangir Ghaffari; Inés Morales; Sancho Gracia
- Cinematography: Leopoldo Villaseñor
- Edited by: Pedro del Rey
- Music by: Alfonso Santisteban
- Production company: Plata Films
- Distributed by: Hispano Mexicana Films
- Release date: 30 December 1974
- Running time: 94 minutes
- Country: Spain
- Language: Spanish

Dick Turpin is a 1974 Spanish historical adventure film directed by Fernando Merino and starring Cihangir Ghaffari, Inés Morales and Sancho Gracia. It is based on the life of the legendary English highwayman Dick Turpin.

The film's sets were designed by the art director Adolfo Cofiño.

== Cast ==
- Cihangir Ghaffari as Dick Turpin
- Inés Morales as Isabel
- Sancho Gracia as Richard
- Manuel Zarzo as Brassier
- Rafael Hernández as Peter
- Cris Huerta as Conde de Belfort
- Helga Liné as Anna
- Antonio Mayans as Sean McGregor
- Paloma Cela as María
- Luis Gaspar as Thomas
- Ramón Lillo as Dan
- André Konan as Bud
- Ricardo Palacios as Moscarda
- Isabel Luque as Dama asaltada
- Tito García as Mesonero
- Juan Antonio Soler as Conde de Durham
- Javier de Rivera as Fray Benito
- Cristino Almodóvar as Oficial 1
- Román Ariznavarreta as Oficial 2

== Bibliography ==
- Pascual Cebollada & Luis Rubio Gil. Enciclopedia del cine español: cronología. Ediciones del Serbal, 1996.
