= The Perfect Killer =

1977 film

- Directed by: Mario Siciliano
- Written by: Santiago Moncada; Mario Siciliano
- Starring: Lee Van Cleef; Carmen Cervera; John Ireland
- Cinematography: Alejandro Ulloa
- Edited by: Otello Colangeli
- Music by: Stelvio Cipriani
- Release date: 1977
- Countries: Italy; Spain
- Language: Italian

The Perfect Killer (Italian: Quel pomeriggio maledetto, lit. 'That damned afternoon', Spanish: Objetivo: matar, lit. 'Objective: kill'), also known as Satanic Mechanic, is a 1977 crime drama film directed by Mario Siciliano under the pseudonym Marlon Sirko. An Italian-Spanish co-production, it stars Lee Van Cleef, Carmen Cervera and John Ireland.

== Cast ==
- Lee Van Cleef as Harry Chapman
- Carmen Cervera as Krista
- John Ireland as Benny
- Alberto Dell'Acqua as Luc
- Karin Well as Liz
- Fernando Sancho as the Arms Dealer
- Aldo Bufi Landi as Jack

== Production ==
The film was produced by Metheus Film and Julio Pérez Tabernero P.C.

== Release ==
The film was released in Italian cinemas by Matheus on 30 November 1977. In Spain, it was released in September 1981.

== Reception ==
Corriere della Sera's film critic Maurizio Porro described the film as "a schizophrenic giallo", "not because of any sharp sense of tension, but due to a complete lack of logic and coherence". Film historian Roberto Curti noted the film's plot similarities with Charles Bronson's vehicles The Mechanic and Violent City, and described it as "essentially a rather downbeat film noir" that "looks little like other Italian crime efforts of the period", and praised the "remarkable villain" played by Alberto Dell'Acqua, whose scenes "are much more enjoyable that the overall story, which feels needlessly contrived at times and somewhat drags in its middle section".

The film grossed 221.903 million lire at the Italian box office.
