= Jun Aristorenas =

Filipino actor (1933–2000)

- Born: Juanito Madarang Aristorenas; May 7, 1933; Manila, Philippine Islands
- Died: April 25, 2000 (aged 66); Metro Manila, Philippines
- Resting place: Manila Memorial Park – Sucat, Paranaque, Philippines
- Occupations: Actor, film director, film producer, dancer, writer
- Years active: 1957–2000
- Spouse: Virginia Gaerlan
- Children: 2

Juanito "Jun" Madarang Aristorenas (May 7, 1933 – April 25, 2000) was a Filipino actor, director, dancer, producer and writer. Aristorenas was known for his western roles, and had topbilled cowboy movies such as Sagupaan ng mga Patapon, Dugong Tigre, and Apat na Bagwis.

As an actor, Aristorenas has performed in movies such as Danilo Ronquillo: Cavite Boy, released in 1965, in which he portrayed Danilo Ronquillo, Rico Solitaryo (1966), and Bale-bale Kung Lumaban (1964). As a movie director, he has worked on movies such as Matalino man ang matsing na-iisahan din!, released in 2000, Cara y Cruz: Walang Sinasanto! (1996), and Marami Ka Pang Kakaining Bigas (1994).

Aristorenas has also written the story of "Matalino man ang matsing na-iisahan din!", released in 2000.

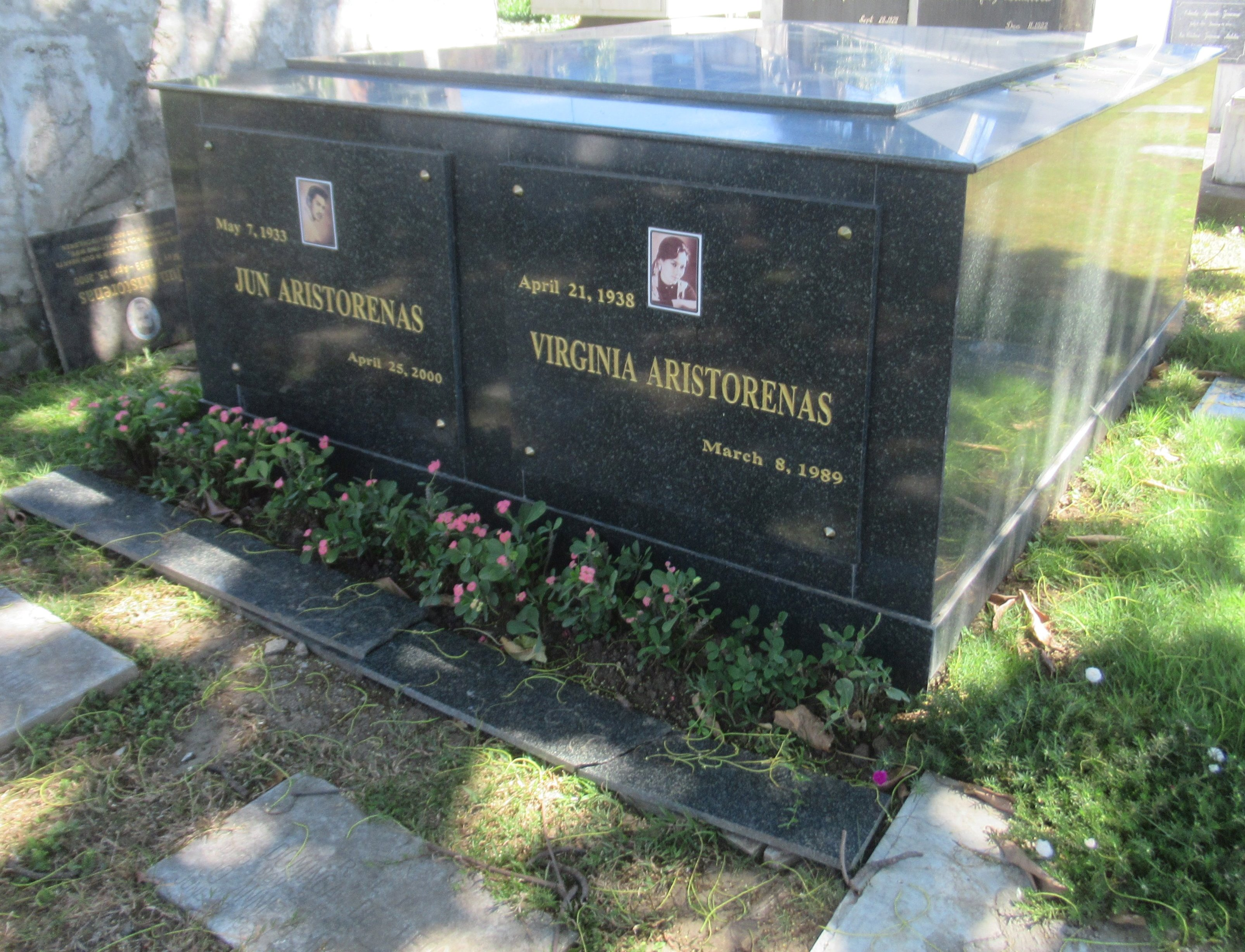
Virginia Gaerlan & Aristorenas' graves at Manila Memorial Park – Sucat.

== Personal life ==
Aristorenas was married to Virginia Gaerlan (April 21, 1938 – March 8, 1989), a former actress. Their sons, Robin (born 1964), Junar (born 1968) are former child actors.

== Filmography ==
- Turista (1957)
- Eternally (1957)
- Alias Golden Boy (1963)
- Labo-labo (1964)
- Agent 69 (1964)
- Sagupaan ng mga Patapon (1964)
- Bilis at Tapang (1964)
- Dugong Tigre (1964) as Dugong Tigre
- Bale-bale Kung Lumaban (1964)
- Danilo Ronquillo: Cavite Boy (1965) as Danilo Ronquillo
- Tatlo sa Tatlo (1965)
- Limbas: Walang gulat! (1965)
- Ben Barracuda (1965) as Ben Barracuda
- Soliman Brothers (1966)
- Rico Solitaryo (1966)
- Not for Hire (1966)
- Katapat ng Bawat Lakas (1966)
- Ang Babaing Ito ay Akin! (1966)
- Johnny West (1966) as Johnny West
- Valiente Brothers (1968)
- Tigre Gitano (1968)
- Simarron Brothers (1968)
- Rancho Diablo (1968) as Professional Gambler
- Magnum Barracuda (1968) as Magnum Barracuda
- Eskinita 29 (1968)
- De Colores (1968)
- Deadly Jacks (1968)
- Cuadro de Jack (1968)
- 3 Kilabot sa Barilan (1968) as Tiger
- The Samurai Fighters (1969)
- The Magnificent Ifugao (1969)
- Samurai Master (1969)
- El Tigre (1969)
- 3 Patapon (1969)
- San Diego (1970)
- Dimasalang (1970) as Dimasalang
- Pulang Lupa (1971)
- Mandawi (1971)
- Guadalupe (1971)
- Putol na Kampilan (1972)
- Elias, Basilio at Sisa (1972) as Elias
- Apat na Bagwis (1972)
- San Cristobal (1972)
- KINGPin (1973)
- Hit and Run (1975)
- Mulawin (1976)
- She Devils in Chains (1976)
- Ang Pagbabalik ni Harabas at Bulilit (1977)
- Harabas' Angels (1979) as Harabas
- Harabas at Kidlat (1980)
- Rocky Four-ma (1986)
- Isang Kumot Tatlong Unan (1986)
- Baril at Balisong (1986)
- Ano Ba Yan? (1992) as Lt. Joe Estrada
- Leonardo Delos Reyes: Alyas Waway (1993) as Captain Llamas
- Masahol pa sa Hayop (1993) as Gen. Montalban
- Victor Meneses: Dugong Kriminal (1993) as Mang Temiong
- Markadong Hudas (1993) as Don Gonzalo
- Di na natuto (Sorry na, Puede ba?) (1993)
- Cuadro de Jack (1994) as Joe
- Marami Ka Pang Kakaining Bigas (1994) as Eric
- Urban Rangers (1995) as Zaragosa
- Hagedorn (1996) as Mr. Angeles
- Melencio Magat: Dugo Laban sa Dugo (1996) as Gomer
- Isa, Dalawa, Takbo! (1996) as Pompeyo
- Cara y Cruz: Walang Sinasanto! (1996) as Don Sebastian
- Matalino Man ang Matsing Na-iisahan Din! (2000)
- Pag Oras Mo, Oras Mo Na [Games of the Generals] (2000)
