= Kitty Swan =

Danish actress (born 1943)

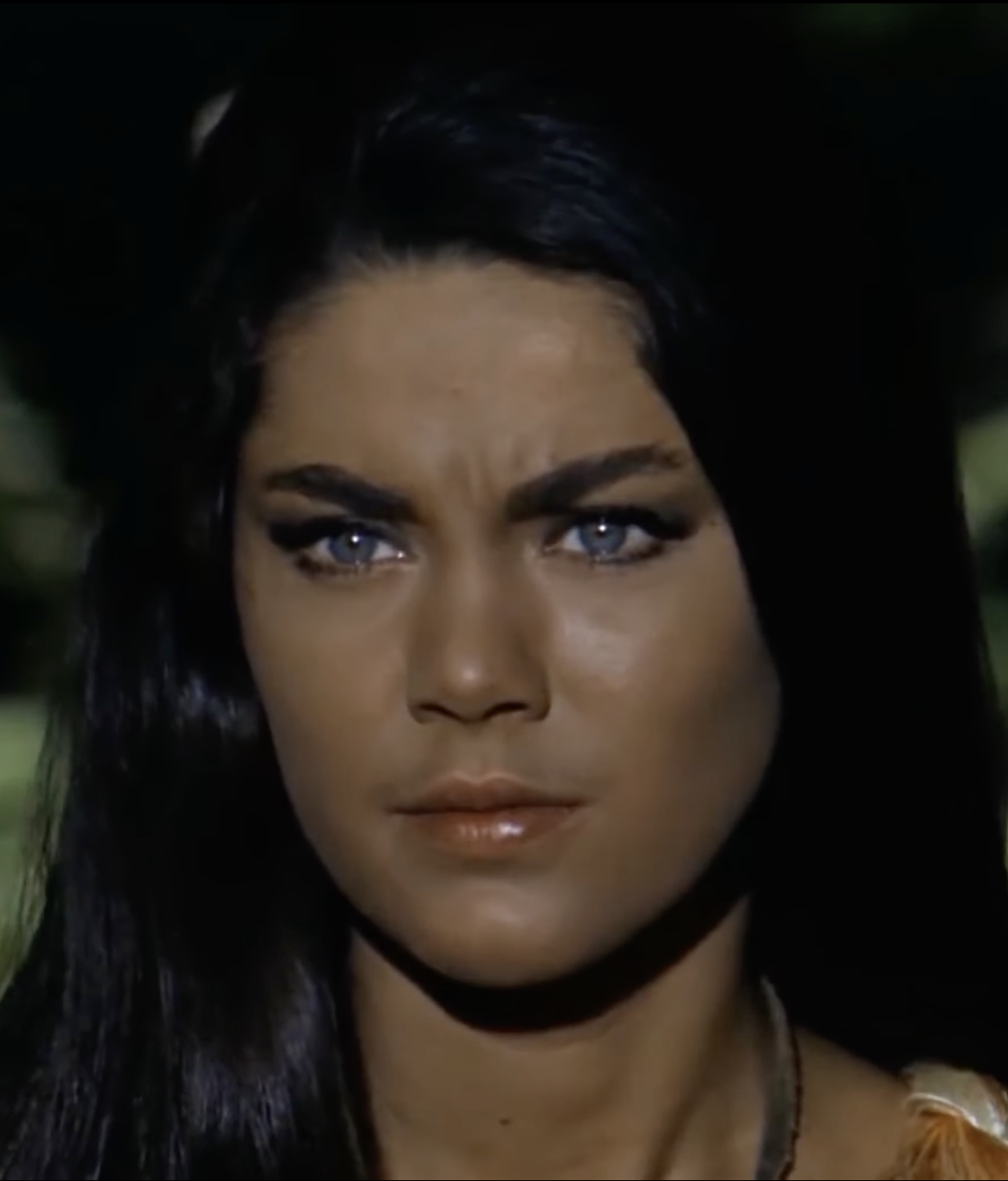
- Kitty Swan as Gungala in Gungala, the Virgin of the Jungle (1967)
- Born: Kirsten Svanholm; 25 May 1943 (age 83); Copenhagen, Denmark
- Occupation: Actress
- Years active: 1966–1972

Kitty Swan (born Kirsten Svanholm; 25 May 1943) is a Danish actress. She appeared in more than twelve films from 1966 to 1972.

== Early life ==
Kitty Swan was born on 25 May 1943 in Copenhagen, Denmark.

== Career ==
Kitty Swan was known for portraying the jungle girl Gungala in the 1967 sexploitation film Gungala, the Virgin of the Jungle and its 1968 sequel Gungala, the Black Panther Girl. The film careers of Swan, and co-star Steve Hawkes, were ended after they suffered serious burns on the set of Tarzan and the Brown PrinceA 1972 sequel, Tarzan and the Brown Prince, followed with sequences filmed in Rainbow Springs, Florida, where both Sipek and Swan were burned in a fire that got out of control. When the two actors were tied down in a scene, some spilled fuel began a blaze that panicked the film crew. The lion in the film who had been trained to remove Hawkes' bonds freed him. though he suffered 90% burns to his body. Sipek vowed he would pay the lion back by looking after big cats.

== Selected filmography ==
Year	Title	Role	Notes
1966	Almost a Man		
1966	How We Robbed the Bank of Italy		
1967	Il vostro super agente Flit		
1967	Gungala, the Virgin of the Jungle	Gungala	
1968	Gungala, the Black Panther Girl	Gungala	
1969	Tarzan's Greatest Challenge	Irula	
1972	Tarzan and the Brown Prince	Irula	Also known as Tarzan and Treasure of the Emerald Cave
