= Tarzan and the Brown Prince =

1972 Spanish/Italian adventure film

- Original film poster
- Directed by: Manuel Caño
- Written by: Santiago Moncada; Dario Sabatello
- Based on: Characters created by Edgar Rice Burroughs
- Produced by: Dario Sabatello
- Starring: Steve Sipek; Kitty Swan; Robin Aristorenas; Peter Lee Lawrence
- Cinematography: Marcello Masciocchi
- Music by: Sante Maria Romitelli
- Distributed by: CITA Films; Produzione D.S. (Dario Sabatello)
- Release date: 1972
- Language: Various

Tarzan and the Brown Prince is a 1972 Spanish/Italian co-production Tarzan film with Steve Sipek and Kitty Swan repeating their roles from 1968's King of the Jungle. The film became a serialised Filipino graphic novel written in Tagalog and illustrated by Franc Reyes who acted as an illustrator on the film. The role of the Brown Prince was played by Filipino child actor Robin Aristorenas.

== Synopsis ==
After a ruler dies, tradition dictates the new ruler must accomplish a series of harrowing challenges whilst competing with other aspirants. One of them, a young prince (Robin Aristorenas) engages in the contest, but evildoers plan the young prince's demise. Tarzan protects him while ensuring he meets the tests.

== Production ==
Steve Sipek also known as Steve Hawkes gained recognition by playing Tarzan in two Spanish/Italian produced films. Tarzán en la gruta del oro/King of the Jungle/Tarzan in the Golden Grotto (1968) that was filmed in Suriname, South America, Florida, Africa, Spain and Italy where the producers ran out of money and had to begin filming again. Unlike his first "Tarzan" film, Sipek claimed the film company paid the huge licensing fees from Edgar Rice Burroughs' estate and were able to use the name "Tarzan" for the character.

Portions were filmed in Rainbow Springs Florida where both Sipek and Swan were burned in a fire that got out of control. When the two actors were tied down in a scene, some spilled fuel began a blaze that panicked the film crew. The lion in the film who had been trained to remove Hawkes' bonds freed him, though he suffered 90% burns to his body. Sipek vowed he would pay the lion back by looking after big cats.
