= Zorrita Martinez =

- Directed by: Vicente Escrivá
- Written by: Vicente Escrivá
- Starring: José Luis López Vázquez; Nadiuska; Manuel Zarzo
- Cinematography: Raúl Pérez Cubero
- Edited by: Pedro del Rey
- Music by: Antón García Abril
- Production companies: Aspa Producciones Cinematográficas; Impala
- Distributed by: Warner Española S.A.
- Release date: 1975
- Running time: 95 minutes
- Country: Spain
- Language: Spanish

Zorrita Martinez (Spanish: Zorrita Martínez) is a 1975 Spanish comedy drama film directed by Vicente Escrivá and starring José Luis López Vázquez, Nadiuska and Manuel Zarzo. A Venezuelan performer living in Spain gets married so she can get a permit to stay in the country.

The film's sets were designed by the art director Adolfo Cofiño.

== Cast ==
- José Luis López Vázquez as Serafín
- Nadiuska as Zorrita
- Manuel Zarzo as Manolo
- Bárbara Rey as Bibiana
- Rafael Alonso as Don Arturo
- Fernando Santos as Comisario
- Jesús Guzmán as Subirana
- Francisco Cecilio as Mariquita
- José Luis Lizalde
- Luis Barbero as Sacerdote
- Emilio S. Espinosa
- Carmen Platero
- José Alonso
- Yolanda Farr
- Mariano Venancio
- Raquel Rodrigo as Monja
- Judy Stephen as Mujer de Jonathan
- Víctor Israel as Paciente con muletas
- Alfonso del Real as Ortigosa
- Juana Jiménez
- Marisa Bell as Corista
- Lola Lemos
- Emilio Fornet as Paciente
- Scott Miller as Jonathan
- Fabián Conde as Paciente
- Elmer Modling as Americano
- Guadalupe Muñoz Sampedro as Madre superiora
- Alberto de Mendoza as Antonio

== Bibliography ==
- Rafael de España. Directory of Spanish and Portuguese film-makers and films. Greenwood Press, 1994.
