= Steve Sipek =

Croatian-born American actor and animal sanctuary owner (1942–2019)

Stjepan Šipek (Sisak 1942 – June 23, 2019), also known by his screen name Steve Hawkes, was a Croatian-born American actor and animal sanctuary owner.

== Life ==
Sipek was born in Yugoslavia, what is now Croatia, relocated to Canada in 1959, and subsequently acted in B-movies as Steve Hawkes. He played Tarzan in the 1969 Spanish-made film Tarzán en la gruta del oro / King of the Jungle / Tarzan in the Golden Grotto alongside Kitty Swan, filmed in Suriname, Florida, Africa, Spain and Italy where the producers ran out of money and had to begin filming again. Sipek, working under the name Steve Hawkes, claimed that the film company could not pay the huge licensing fees from Edgar Rice Burroughs' estate and settled for the name "Zan" for the character.

A 1972 sequel, Tarzan and the Brown Prince, followed with sequences filmed in Rainbow Springs, Florida, where both Sipek and Swan were burned in a fire that got out of control. When the two actors were tied down in a scene, some spilled fuel began a blaze that panicked the film crew. The lion in the film who had been trained to remove Hawkes' bonds freed him, though he suffered 90% burns to his body. Sipek vowed he would pay the lion back by looking after big cats.

Sipek also wrote, directed and starred in other films such as Blood Freak and Stevie, Samson and Delilah. The second film was based around his love of his immediate family and how they integrated with his beloved pets.

An animal lover, Sipek later relocated to Loxahatchee, Florida where he started an animal sanctuary that attracted attention when a Bengal tiger escaped and was killed.

He died on June 23, 2019, at the age of 77.
