= Man with the Golden Winchester =

1973 film

- Directed by: Gianfranco Baldanello
- Written by: Arpad DeRiso; Joaquín Luis Romero Marchent; Guido Zurli
- Starring: Alberto Dell'Acqua; Fernando Sancho
- Cinematography: Franco Delli Colli
- Edited by: Gian Maria Messeri
- Music by: Carmelo Gigante
- Release date: 1973
- Language: Italian

Man with the Golden Winchester (Italian: Il figlio di Zorro, Spanish: El hijo del Zorro, also known as Son of Zorro) is a 1973 Spaghetti Western-adventure film directed by Gianfranco Baldanello and starring Alberto Dell'Acqua and Fernando Sancho.

== Plot ==
The young nobleman Don Ricardo Villaverde lives in Mexico, which is ruled by Emperor Maximilian and led by Governor Leblanche as his very enjoyable representative Son of Zorro, a fighter for the poor peons and rebels suffering under the governor and thus for the revolution. When a load of weapons is on its way to the Alcalde of the town of San Ramon, Don Herrera Coser, the transport is attacked by the rebel Garincha and Herrera is killed; his daughter Donna Conchita escapes with the help of the son of Zoro and is hidden by him. They both fall in love. Meanwhile, the weapons become the property of the rebels who equip the peons with them and the revolution begins, causing the governor and his wife to flee. The son of Zorro, who made all these happenings possible and supported, goes to the house of the unhappily married Conchita and reveals himself to her.

== Cast ==
- Alberto Dell'Acqua (credited as Robert Widmark) as Don Rocardo Villaverde (Zorro)
- Fernando Sancho as Col. Michel Leblanche
- Elisa Ramírez as Conchita Herrera
- William Berger as Mathias Boyd
- George Wang as Pedro Garincha
- Dada Gallotti as Mathilde Leblanche
- Franco Fantasia as Captain François Bardeau
- Marina Malfatti as Mathilda

== See also ==
- List of Italian films of 1973
