= The Designated Victim =

- Italian film poster
- Directed by: Maurizio Lucidi
- Screenplay by: Fulvio Gicca Palli; Fabio Carpi; Luigi Malerba
- Story by: Augusto Caminito; Maurizio Lucidi; Aldo Lado; Antonio Troiso
- Produced by: Vico Pavoni
- Starring: Tomas Milian; Pierre Clémenti; Katia Christine; Luigi Casellato; Marisa Bartoli; Ottavio Alessi
- Cinematography: Aldo Tonti
- Edited by: Alessandro Lucidi
- Music by: Luis Enriquez Bacalov; New Trolls
- Production company: Produzioni Cinematografiche Europee (P.C.E.)
- Distributed by: Euro International Films
- Release date: 22 April 1971
- Running time: 105 minutes
- Country: Italy
- Language: Italian

The Designated Victim (Italian: La vittima designata, also known as Slam Out) is a 1971 Italian giallo film directed by Maurizio Lucidi.

== Plot ==
Ad executive Stefano Augenti (Milian) is at the height of his career, but has a tumultuous marriage to Luisa (Bartoli). Luisa, a socialite, refuses to fund his projects and resents his affair with French citizen Fabienne Béranger (Christine). On the street, Stefano meets the enigmatic Count Matteo Tiepolo (Clémenti), who warns it’ll be destiny if they meet four more times. Sure enough, they continue to cross paths, and when they meet at a party, Matteo speaks with Stefano alone on the boat ride home to imply he wants something out of their "friendship".

On their fourth meeting, where Matteo deliberately seeks Stefano out, he mentions they’ve both got people in their lives they have problems with: Stefano bickering with Luisa, and Matteo’s brother fights with him and plays mind games constantly. Matteo insists they each kill the other’s respective family, so they may be rid of their problems and get away with the "perfect crime" from barely having relations to each other. Stefano refuses, but he does forge Luisa’s signature to get the project going, then takes a German woman, Christina Müller (Cardini), home with him.

After a row with Luisa, where Matteo sent Luisa flowers hinting at Stefano’s deception and affairs, Stefano storms out because of the situation, while Matteo arrives shortly after and convinces Luisa to let him in. When Stefan’s returns, the police are crawling throughout his home, the apartment is trashed, and Luisa is strangled to death in her bed with a stocking, in what looks like a robbery gone wrong. Stefano slowly becomes the prime suspect, due to his affairs and business troubles, and he can’t prove what happened the night she was murdered because he can’t find Christina or a ticket he had from passing through a toll booth. Stefan tries to accuse Matteo, but as he’s nobility, the police don’t believe Stefano.

Matteo follows Stefano around, haunting his life and demanding he do what Matteo ordered of him, leaving Stefano increasingly unhinged with the walls closing in on him. It’s only worse as Matteo framed Stefano as a contingency, having hired Christina to find Stefano for a setup, and sending Luisa’s jewelry he didn’t hide in a curtain rod in the house to Fabienne. Matteo eventually tells Stefano his plans: he will invite his brother to dinner at his Venetian mansion, and Stefano is to snipe him to death at the appropriate time.

Matteo dispatches the police to rush Stefano’s decision on the murder plot, so Stefano gathers the rifle Matteo arranged for him and rushes to the vantage point. As the police and Fabienne try to find Stefano and to stop him, he fires into the mansion, aiming at the dining room where Matteo and his brother are supposed to be. It is then revealed that the person Stefano killed was Matteo, hoping to finally be rid of him once and for all.

== Cast ==
- Tomas Milian as Stefano Augenti
- Pierre Clémenti as Matteo Tiepolo
- Katia Christine as Fabienne Béranger
- Luigi Casellato as Commissioner Finzi
- Marisa Bartoli as Luisa Augenti
- Ottavio Alessi as Balsamo
- Sandra Cardini as Christina Müller
- Enzo Tarascio as Del Bosco
- Bruno Boschetti as Butler
