= Manuel Zarzo =

Spanish actor (1932–2025)

- Born: Manuel López Zarza; 26 April 1932; Madrid, Spain
- Died: June 2025 (aged 93); Pozuelo de Alarcón, Spain
- Other name: Manolo Zarzo
- Occupation: Actor
- Years active: 1951–2022

Manuel López Zarza (Spanish: [manˈwel ˈlopeθ ˈθaɾθa]; 26 April 1932 – 16 or 17 June 2025), better known as Manuel Zarzo (Spanish: [ˈθaɾθo]), was a Spanish film actor. He appeared in more than 200 television and film works over his seven-decade long career.

Zarzo made his film debut in Day by Day (1951). In 1960, the actor was clinically dead for two hours due to an injury received saving a woman from a fire.

Zarzo died in Pozuelo de Alarcón on the night of 16 to 17 June 2025, at the age of 93.

== Selected filmography ==
- Day by Day (1951)
- Love in a Hot Climate (1954)
- Cursed Mountain (1954)
- The Fisher of Songs (1954)
- The Song of the Nightingale (1959)
- The Showgirl (1960)
- The Delinquents (1960)
- My Love Is Called Margarita (1961)
- The Balcony of the Moon (1962)
- Bullet in the Flesh (1964)
- Weeping for a Bandit (1964)
- Sheriff Won't Shoot (1965)
- The 317th Platoon (1965)
- Seven Golden Men (1965)
- Seven Golden Men Strike Again (1966)
- Seven Guns for the MacGregors (1966)
- Madamigella di Maupin (1966)
- Up the MacGregors! (1967)
- It's Your Move (1968)
- Train for Durango (1968)
- Will Our Heroes Be Able to Find Their Friend Who Has Mysteriously Disappeared in Africa? (1968)
- The Price of Power (1969)
- The Legend of Frenchie King (1971)
- Long Live Robin Hood (1971)
- My Dear Killer (1972)
- The Two Faces of Fear (1972)
- Counselor at Crime (1973)
- Ricco the Mean Machine (1973)
- Little Funny Guy (1973)
- Holy God, Here Comes the Passatore! (1973)
- Dick Turpin (1974)
- Zorrita Martinez (1975)
- Naked Therapy (1975)
- Unmarried Mothers (1975)
- Order to Kill (1975)
- Ambitious (1976)
- Saturday, Sunday and Friday (1979)
- Encounters in the Deep (1979)
- Nightmare City (1980)
- Old Shirt to New Jacket (1982)
- La colmena (1982)
- Stico (1985)
- Requiem for a Spanish Peasant (1985)
- The Bastard Brother of God (1986)
- The Color of the Clouds (1997)
- The Wolf (2004)
- Tiovivo c. 1950 (2004)
- Proyecto Dos (2008)
