= Seven Guns for the MacGregors =

1968 film

- Directed by: Franco Giraldi
- Screenplay by: Enzo Dell' Aquila; Fernando di Leo; David Moreno; Duccio Tessari
- Story by: David Moreno
- Produced by: Dario Sabatello
- Starring: Robert Woods; Manolo Zarzo; Fernando Sancho; Agata Flory
- Cinematography: Alejandro Ulloa
- Edited by: Mario Morra; Nino Baragli
- Music by: Ennio Morricone
- Production companies: Jolly Film; Produzione D.S.; Estela Films
- Distributed by: U.N.I.D.I.S
- Release date: 1966
- Countries: Italy; Spain

Seven Guns for the MacGregors (Italian: Sette pistole per i MacGregor) is a Technicolor 1966 Spaghetti Western. It is the directorial debut film of Franco Giraldi (here credited as Frank Garfield), who was Sergio Leone's assistant in A Fistful of Dollars. The film gained a great commercial success and generated an immediate sequel, Up the MacGregors! (1967), again directed by Giraldi,

== Plot ==
The MacGregors, horse ranchers of Scottish descent, are underway to the market when they are robbed of their horses by a gang under the helm of a corrupt sheriff. One of the brothers infiltrates the gang but his first attempt tries to play them backfires.

== Cast ==
- Robert Woods as Gregor MacGregor
- Fernando Sancho as Miguel
- Agata Flori as Rosita Carson
- Nazzareno Zamperla as Peter MacGregor
- Paolo Magalotti as Kenneth MacGregor
- Leo Anchóriz as Santillana
- Perla Cristal as Perla
- George Rigaud as Alastair MacGregor
- Manuel Zarzo as David MacGregor
- Alberto Dell'Acqua as Dick MacGregor (credited as Cole Kitosch)
- Julio Pérez Tabernero as Mark MacGregor
- Cris Huerta as Crawford
- Rafael Bardem as Justice Garland
- Víctor Israel as Trevor

== Release ==
Seven Guns for the MacGregors was released ins 1966. It was distributed by U.N.I.D.I.S. in Italy. The film was followed by the sequel Up the MacGregors! featuring overlapping plot and character similarities.

== Reception ==
In contemporary reviews, from "Japa." of Variety found the film to have a "predictable but fast moving plotline" noting that the "offbeat flavor of having the Scottish MacGregor clan living in the rough in 19th century Texas gives this Italian western an added zing., helping overcome simplistic scripting and pedestrian direction." and that the film "avoids pitfalls of many overblown Italo-made westerns which tend to become over philosophical and dramatic in their approach to violence and love in the old west." A review in the Monthly Film Bulletin noted that the films "colour is so variable and that the script plays it straight around the middle, where the blood-letting makes an uneasy contrast with the tongue-incheek bravado of the earlier scenes."
