= Lonely Hearts (1970 film) =

- Directed by: Franco Giraldi
- Written by: Franco Giraldi; Ruggero Maccari
- Produced by: Ugo Santalucia
- Starring: Ugo Tognazzi; Senta Berger
- Cinematography: Dario Di Palma
- Edited by: Franco Arcalli
- Music by: Luis Bacalov
- Release date: 1970
- Running time: 122 minutes
- Country: Italy
- Language: Italian

Lonely Hearts (Italian: Cuori solitari) is a 1970 Italian romantic drama film directed by Franco Giraldi.

== Plot ==
The upper class couple Stefano and Giovanna spend the summer in their little house on Lake Como. The everyday life of the 45-year-old architect and the young housewife is monotonous and boring. One morning a young couple pitched a tent on their property and is swimming naked in the lake. Stefano's brief indignation quickly evaporates in favor of his interest in the visitor. He lets the couple spend the night in his house and makes hints that he would be interested in a partner swap.

Nothing will come of it because the young people in love stay to themselves and unabashedly practice their exciting sex life. The next morning they disappeared. Despite Stefano's verbal moralism, he sleeps with his secretary. He comes up to Giovanna more and more frequently on the topic of partner swapping without her abandoning her negative attitude. She also has little interest in his suggestion to post an ad and simply read the incoming letters. While reading the box number ads in the newspaper, she suddenly discovered something that she suspected Stefano was behind. He immediately admits it. Reading the letters received gives the couple an amusing evening. Due to Stefano's persistent obsession with swapping partners, Giovanna finally agrees. The first couple they go to turn out to be old and unsightly. Giovanna laughs and they leave. When the second couple comes to visit, Stefano takes a liking to the woman, but Giovanna finds the man pushy. Stefano then comes to mind where he has already seen the woman: in a photo as a prostitute. He rightly suspects an attempt at fraud and the man makes off with the whore. After another, unsuccessful visit to a corresponding club in Ticino, they give it up.

An unexpected opportunity arises later when they let their friends Diego and Gabriella show them a large palazzo. Giovanna is really taken with the cultivated and handsome Diego. While he is playing a Beethoven piece for her on the piano, Gabriella goes to bed with Stefano in a bedroom. But when Diego's piano can suddenly no longer be heard, Stefano suffers a blockage. He runs from bedroom to bedroom in the Palazzo without being able to find Giovanna. In the morning she appears before him with the face of a woman who has had a great night. He doesn't want to know anything about swapping partners; Distraught, he asks her to confirm under an oath that nothing has happened that night. It gives him, slightly alienated, the required support in his attempt to suppress reality.

== Cast ==
- Ugo Tognazzi: Stefano
- Senta Berger: Giovanna
- Silvano Tranquilli: Diego
- Clara Colosimo: Carla
- Edda Di Benedetto: Elena
- Orso Maria Guerrini

== See also ==
- List of Italian films of 1970
