= Mario Siciliano =

Italian film director, screenwriter and film producer

- Born: 1925; Rome, Italy
- Died: January 1987 (aged 61–62); Rome, Italy
- Occupation: Director
- Years active: 1969–1984

Mario Siciliano (1925–1987) was an Italian film director, screenwriter and producer.

In 1962 he founded Metheus Film.

He directed more than twenty films from 1969 to 1984. He often used the names Marlon Sirko, Lee Castle, and Luca Delli Azzer.

== Selected filmography ==
Year	Title	Role
1966	How to Seduce a Playboy	Producer, Writer
1969	The Seven Red Berets	Director, Producer
1969	Taste of Vengeance	Director
1970	La lunga notte dei disertori – I 7 di Marsa Matruh	Director
1972	Alleluja & Sartana are Sons... Sons of God	Director
1972	Trinity and Sartana Are Coming	Director
1975	Beyond the Exorcism	Director
1976	Campagnola bella	Director
1977	The Perfect Killer	Director
1978	The Wild Geese Attack Again	Director
1981	Happy Sex	Director
1984	Rolf	Director
