= Up the MacGregors! =

1967 film

- Directed by: Franco Giraldi
- Screenplay by: Fernando Di Leo; Enzo Dell'Aquila; Paolo Levi; José Maria Rodriguez; Franco Giraldi
- Story by: Fernando Di Leo; Enzo Dell'Aquila
- Starring: David Bailey; Agata Flori; Leo Anchóriz
- Cinematography: Alejandro Ulloa
- Edited by: Nino Baragli
- Music by: Ennio Morricone
- Production companies: Jolly Film; Produzione D.S.; Talia Films
- Distributed by: U.N.I.D.I.S
- Release dates: 1967 (Rome); July 1967 (Spain)
- Countries: Italy; Spain

Up the MacGregors! (Italian: 7 donne per i MacGregor, also known as 7 Women for the MacGregors) is a 1967 Italian spaghetti Western Technicolor film in Techniscope directed by Franco Giraldi (credited as Frank Garfield). It is the immediate sequel of Seven Guns for the MacGregors, still directed by Giraldi.

== Plot summary ==
On the eve of one of his sons' marriage, the elder MacGregor, worried that the bride might be after his family's fortune, wakes up in the middle of the night to take out a chest of gold ingots and coins and bury it outside their house. Unbeknown to him, he is being secretly watched by bandits.

On the day of the engagement party between his son Gregor and Rosita Carson, the bandit Maldonado, along with his gang, rob the MacGregors of the gold that the elder MacGregor buried. They leave a note, purporting to be from Frank James, in the hole where the chest of gold was buried. The MacGregor brothers throw themselves in pursuit of Frank James. When they find Frank who is now a run down old man, they are told that he was framed by Maldonado. They then set out again to find Maldonado.

Maldonado summons a traveling dentist to his hideout. Gregor joins the dentist and his blonde daughter, Dolly, on their trip to the hideout. Rosita, upon hearing that Gregor is with the blonde, rides out to confront Dolly in a fit of jealousy. To the delight of onlookers, Rosita defeats Dolly in a fistfight, but her and Gregor are taken prisoner by the outlaws. The remaining MacGregor brothers ride out to Maldonado's hide out to rescue Gregor and Rosita and recover the gold. They escape but are later trapped in an empty cargo train wagon. Soon they are rescued by their parents, the Donovans, a band of Apaches, and other cowboys. During a fight with Gregor, Maldonado is killed.

== Cast ==
- David Bailey as Gregor MacGregor
- Agata Flori as Rosita Carson (credited as Agatha Flory)
- Nazzareno Zamperla as Peter MacGregor (credited as Nick Anderson)
- Roberto Camardiel as Pa Donovan
- Paolo Magalotti as Kenneth MacGregor (credited as Peter Carter)
- Ana Casares as Dolly
- Víctor Israel as Trevor
- Leo Anchóriz as Maldonado
- George Rigaud as Alistair MacGregor
- Alberto Dell'Acqua as Dick MacGregor (credited as Cole Kitosch)
- Hugo Blanco as David MacGregor
- Jeff Cameron as Bandit (credited as Nino Scarciofolo)
- Francesco Tensi as Harold MacGregor (credited as Harry Cotton)
- Saturno Cerra as Johnny MacGregor
- Julio Perez Tabernero as Mark MacGregor
- Ana Maria Noe as Mamie MacGregor (credited as Anne Marie Noe)
- Margherita Horowitz as Annie MacGregor (credited as Margaret Horowitz)

== Production ==
The film has the same cast as its predecessor except for Manuel Zarzo and Robert Woods, who refused their roles due to conflicts with the leading actress Agata Flori, the wife of producer Dario Sabatello.

== Release ==
Up the MacGregors! was released in Rome in 1967 and in Spain in July 1967.

Although a sequel, Up the MacGregors! was released in the United States prior to the prequel Seven Guns for the MacGregors.

== Reception ==
Like the first movie about the McGregor family, this sequel is a combination of violence and comedy. The family gold is stolen by a gang of Mexican bandits and it's up to the sons to retrieve it. They also save seven sisters in danger of being abducted (hence the title). Robert Woods is replaced by the relatively unknown David Bailey. Agatha Flori turns in a lively performance as Rosita, in hot pursuit (very hot) of her fiancée after she has heard rumors about him and a voluptuous blonde.

In a contemporary review, Stuart Byron of Variety found the film to be "an acceptably entertaining affair" while noting the film was bloodless and non-violent but had good action scenes directed by Franco Giraldi.

In his 2010 book Spaghetti Westerns, author Hughes describes the movie as a "...cross between broad comedy (with plenty of rambunctious punch-ups between the Scots and Irish over who has the best whisky) and less than humorous violence.”
