= O.K. Connery =

1967 Italian comedy film

O. K. Connery
- Italian theatrical release poster
- Directed by: Alberto De Martino
- Screenplay by: Paolo Levi; Frank Walker; Stanley Wright; Stefano Canzio
- Story by: Paolo Levi
- Produced by: Dario Sabatello
- Starring: Neil Connery; Daniela Bianchi; Adolfo Celi; Agata Flori; Bernard Lee; Anthony Dawson; Lois Maxwell; Yee-Wah Yang
- Cinematography: Gianni Bergamini
- Edited by: Otello Colangeli
- Music by: Ennio Morricone; Bruno Nicolai
- Production company: Produzione D. S.
- Distributed by: Titanus
- Release dates: 20 April 1967 (Italy); 22 November 1967 (United States)
- Running time: 104 minutes
- Country: Italy
- Language: Italian

O. K. Connery, released in the U. S. as Operation Kid Brother, is a 1967 Italian Eurospy comedy film shot in Technicolor and Techniscope, and directed by Alberto De Martino. The spy-fi plot involves the brother of the British spy James Bond, played by Neil Connery (the actual brother of Sean Connery, star of the Eon Productions Bond films), who is obliged to take the lead in foiling a world-domination plot. The film's cast includes several actors from the Eon-produced James Bond film series: From Russia with Love's Daniela Bianchi, Thunderball's Adolfo Celi, Dr. No's Anthony Dawson, Bernard Lee (M), and Lois Maxwell (Moneypenny), as well as the producer's wife Agata Flori, Gina Lollobrigida's cousin Guido Lollobrigida, and Yasuko Yama (a.k.a. Yee-Wah Young or Yee-Wah Yang, then in the publicity spotlight due to her relationship with James Mason; she appeared as a bath girl in You Only Live Twice under the name Yee-Wah Yang).

The film received generally negative reviews from the New York Times, Variety and the Monthly Film Bulletin. The film was featured on the television series Mystery Science Theater 3000 in 1993.

== Plot ==
A man named Ward Jones lands his light aircraft at an airfield in Monte Carlo, but it is destroyed following a collision with a remote controlled car operated by Thayer, a member of the secret THANATOS organisation. Jones dies in the explosion, and a package is retrieved from the wrecked aircraft by Thayer's henchwoman Maya.

In a medical conference in Monte Carlo, Jones' girlfriend Yachuko escapes from Thayer's henchmen, aided by cosmetic surgeon Neil Connery. She is later kidnapped by British agent Miss Maxwell, but another of Thayer's henchwomen, Krayendorf, then captures Yachuko.

Connery meets Maxwell and her boss Commander Cunningham. Jones had wanted to sell them the package and asked them to protect Yachuko, who also had access to relevant information. Connery believes that Jones has transferred the data to Yachuko using hypnosis. Cunningham demands that Connery help retrieve the information. After being reminded that he killed one of Thayer's henchmen in a fight at the conference, Connery agrees to help in exchange for the police investigation being dropped.

Cunningham dispatches Connery to Malaga where Yachuko has been spotted. Connery and Maxwell are met by Juan, who has left his wedding early to greet them. Thayer's henchwoman Mildred has followed them to Malaga, but Connery hypnotizes her to reveal Yachuko's location, Krayendorf's castle.

Firing an arrow, Connery short-circuits the electric fence protecting the castle and destroys its defensive machine gun position. Connery, Maxwell, Juan and their colleagues then attack the castle and defeat Krayendorf's henchmen. Juan kills Krayendorf and Connery rescues Yachuko. Using hypnosis, he accesses most of the critical information, but Mildred kills Yachuko before the process is complete. Juan then kills Mildred.

Meanwhile, an "atomic nucleus" is being transported by American military police. Maya and more henchwomen dress up as can-can dancers, lure the MPs from their vehicles and steal the nucleus. With it, THANATOS can now power their "ultra-high-frequency magnetic waves", which will cause all metal machines to stop working. This will force world leaders to give THANATOS their gold.

Following up information revealed by Yachuko, Cunningham persuades Connery to travel to Tétouan, Morocco, where Thayer owns a rug factory staffed exclusively by blind men. Goons try to kill Connery in the street, but he is rescued by Maya. THANATOS leader Alpha wants Connery dead, but Thayer wants to keep him alive. Connery attends a party hosted by Thayer, who resents Alpha's power. He is plotting to replace Alpha with a double, and Connery is required to change the man's face. Thayer also plans to murder his henchwomen, a fact that Connery passes on to Maya.

Disguised as a blind Moroccan weaver, Connery infiltrates the factory, where the workers are in contact with dangerous radioactive materials. Connery warns a worker, who soon instigates a riot. Connery is eventually captured by Thayer. Later, at a yacht, Connery is to be forced to transform Thayer's henchman Kurt into an Alpha lookalike. Before the operation begins, Connery hypnotises Kurt, causing him to attack Thayer. Meanwhile, the female crewmembers of Thayer's yacht attack their male counterparts. The women take over the yacht, but Thayer escapes in a rubber dinghy.

Alpha blames Thayer for his failure and demands that he kill himself. Thayer kills Alpha instead and takes control of THANATOS. Connery and Maya meet Juan in Munich, where they are also joined by the Scottish members of a Monte Carlo archery club.

Using a Geiger counter to detect the radioactive rugs, Connery and Maya locate THANATOS's secret lair. Meanwhile, Thayer triggers the magnetic wave, paralysing machinery all over the world. Guns are no longer operational, so bows and arrows are now optimal weapons. Connery, Maya, Juan and the archers enter the base.

While the archers tackle Thayer's henchmen, Connery plants an "anti-magnetic explosive" to stop the wave. He is discovered by Thayer and they fight, culminating in an archery duel in which Thayer is killed. Connery, Maya and the surviving archers escape from the base, which explodes. Cunningham wants to recruit Connery as a permanent agent, but Connery uses his hypnotic powers to dissuade him. Maya and Connery depart on Thayer's yacht for a romantic cruise.

== Cast ==
- Neil Connery as Dr. Neil Connery
- Daniela Bianchi as Maya Rafis
- Adolfo Celi as Mr. Thayer (Beta)
- Agata Flori as Mildred
- Bernard Lee as Commander Cunningham
- Anthony Dawson as Alpha
- Lois Maxwell as Miss Maxwell
- Yee-Wah Yang as Yachuko (credited as Yachuo Yama)
- Franco Giacobini as Juan
- Ana María Noé as Lotte Krayendorf
- Guido Lollobrigida as Kurt

== Production ==
Neil Connery was working as a plasterer in Scotland until he was sacked for losing his tools. Based on Connery's relation to his brother Sean, the matter received international media attention. When Terence Young heard Connery interviewed with his trade union about the matter on the radio, he mentioned to Italian producer Dario Sabatello that Connery sounded like his brother. Sabatello met Connery at the Caledonian Hotel in Edinburgh to recruit him to play the lead role in a Eurospy film. Connery recalled when he did his screen test the crew kept saying "OK, Connery, OK"; that became the title for the film.

Experienced director Alberto De Martino, who had previously filmed Upperseven, the Man to Kill and Special Mission Lady Chaplin (both 1966), recalled his father Romolo de Martino doing Connery's extensive makeup and having problems with Connery's inexperience as an actor. He also recalled Sabatello approaching Sean Connery to do an appearance in the film; he emphatically refused.

Connery's voice is dubbed by an actor with an American accent. In an interview in Cinema Retro, Connery said that he was undergoing medical treatment when voice dubbing of the film was in progress, leading another person to voice his lines in the English version.

Lois Maxwell recalled she earned more money for the film than any of her other award wage payments from her appearances in the Eon Productions 007 films.

O. K. Connery was filmed in Tetuán, Morocco, Monaco and Spain.

== Release ==
O. K. Connery was released in Italy in 1967, the same year Sean Connery left the James Bond series. The film was distributed in the U. S. by United Artists (at the time also the distributor of the Eon Productions Bond films) under the title Operation Kid Brother. It was one of six Italian films released worldwide by United Artists in 1967.

The film had alternate titles for video release which included Operation Double 007, Secret Agent 00, and Operation Kid Brother.

O. K. Connery was featured on the television series Mystery Science Theater 3000 as Operation Double 007 on September 11, 1993.

== Reception ==
In contemporary reviews, Bosley Crowther writing for The New York Times referred to the film as "a wobbly carbon copy of the James Bond thrillers." Variety described the film as so "unbelievably inept," that "many viewers may find it hilarious fun." The Monthly Film Bulletin stated that O. K. Connery was a "grotesque parody of a parody," noting endless allusions to Neil Connery's brother Sean Connery. The review concluded that "the film as a whole is bad enough to be hysterically funny." The Cleveland Press referred to the film as a "dreary and dismal espionage movie," stating that the film lacked the "flair and skill with which the Bond films are made. The script is labored, the direction slow and the acting is barely adequate."

In Phil Hardy's book Science Fiction (1984), a review noted that "though it's stylishly mounted, the result is a routine Italian spy romp."

In an interview in 1996, Lois Maxwell said that Sean Connery, when he learned that she would join the cast, got very angry and started screaming: "You have betrayed me!" but he later forgave her.

As a "James Bond rip-off", reaction to the film is mixed. Ben Child from The Guardian called it one of the worst movies made for the genre. In contrast, Andy Roberts from The Daily Telegraph and Tom Cole for Radio Times considered it to be one of the best.

== See also ==
- Spymaker: The Secret Life of Ian Fleming – a fictionalised account of Ian Fleming played by Jason Connery
- Bernard Lee on stage and screen
- List of Italian films of 1967
- List of James Bond parodies
- List of Mystery Science Theater 3000 episodes
- Outline of James Bond
