= Franco Giraldi =

Italian film director (1931–2020)

- Born: 11 July 1931; Comeno, Kingdom of Italy now Komen, Slovenia
- Died: 2 December 2020 (aged 89); Trieste, Italy
- Occupation(s): Film director, screenwriter

Franco Giraldi (11 July 1931 – 2 December 2020) was an Italian film director and screenwriter.

== Life and career ==
Born in Komen from an Italian father and a Slovene mother, Giraldi spent his childhood and adolescence between the Carso, Trieste and Gorizia. During the Second World War, still in minor age, he helped the Italian partisans.

His first professional contact with the world of cinema was as a film critic from the pages of the newspaper L'Unità. Later Giraldi had the opportunity to work as assistant director of, among others, Gillo Pontecorvo, Giuseppe De Santis, Sergio Corbucci and Sergio Leone. Shortly after his work with Leone in A Fistful of Dollars Giraldi directed his first Spaghetti Western, Seven Guns for the MacGregors, released in 1966.

After four westerns, in which he used the pseudonyms of Frank Garfield and Frank Prestand, in 1968 Giraldi directed his first film with his real name, the commedia all'italiana La bambolona. After some other comedies he dedicated himself to literary adaptations.

Giraldo died from COVID-19 on 2 December 2020, at the age of 89, amidst the COVID-19 pandemic in Italy.

== Filmography ==
- Seven Guns for the MacGregors (1966)
- Sugar Colt (1967)
- Up the MacGregors! (1967)
- A Minute to Pray, a Second to Die (1968)
- La bambolona (1968)
- Lonely Hearts (1970)
- La supertestimone (1971)
- Gli ordini sono ordini (1972)
- La rosa rossa (1973)
- Il lungo viaggio (1975)
- Colpita da improvviso benessere (1976)
- Un anno di scuola (1977)
- La giacca verde (1980)
- Il corsaro (1985)
- The Border (1996)
- L'avvocato Porta (TV-series, 1997–99)
- Voci (2000)
- Delitto e Castigo (2007)
