= Bruno Nicolai =

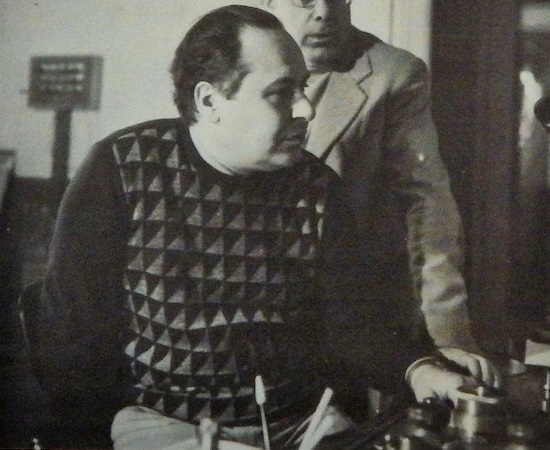

Background information
- Born: 26 May 1926; Rome, Italy
- Died: 16 August 1991 (aged 65) Rome, Italy
- Genres: Film score
- Occupation: Film composer

Bruno Nicolai (20 May 1926 – 16 August 1991) was an Italian film music composer, orchestra director, conductor, pianist and musical editor, most active in the 1960s through the 1980s.

While studying piano and composition at the Santa Cecilia Conservatory in Rome, he befriended Ennio Morricone and formed a long working relationship, with Nicolai eventually conducting for and co-scoring films with Morricone. Morricone noted in an interview discussing the Dollars Trilogy, "I chose a great musician and friend to be my conductor: Bruno Nicolai, who conducted almost every score of mine from that point on until 1974." Nicolai also scored a number of giallo exploitation films and wrote many scores for director Jesús Franco.

== Collaboration with Ennio Morricone ==
Nicolai frequently collaborated with Morricone, conducting many of his scores, including those for Sergio Leone's "For a Few Dollars More" (1965) and "The Good, the Bad and the Ugly" (1966). Morricone praised Nicolai as a great musician and friend who conducted nearly all his scores until 1974. Their partnership eventually ended due to disagreements over credit attribution. His work was featured in the Quentin Tarantino films Kill Bill: Volume 2 and Once Upon a Time in Hollywood.

== Independent career ==
Beyond his work with Morricone, Nicolai established himself as a distinguished composer, scoring over 100 films and numerous television productions. He was particularly noted for his contributions to the giallo and exploitation genres, collaborating with directors like Jesús Franco, Tinto Brass, and Alberto De Martino. Notable scores include "The Red Queen Kills Seven Times" (1972) and "The Case of the Bloody Iris" (1972).

== Musical style and legacy ==
Nicolai's compositions are characterised by their rich orchestration and innovative use of instruments, including bells, anvils, and whips, elements that became synonymous with the spaghetti western sound. He also explored various musical styles, from classical to avant-garde, and was known for his work in library music, founding the labels Gemelli and Edi-Pan.

His music has experienced a resurgence in popularity, featuring in modern films such as Quentin Tarantino's "Kill Bill: Volume 2" (2004) and "Once Upon a Time in Hollywood" (2019).

== Later years and death ==
Nicolai continued to compose and conduct until his final years, with his last known score being for the 1988 TV series "La coscienza di Zeno." He died on 16 August 1991 in Rome. Despite being overshadowed during his lifetime, Nicolai's work has gained recognition posthumously, cementing his status as a significant figure in Italian film music.

== Selected filmography ==
Year	Film	Directed by	Notes	Latest CD / Digital Release
1964	Romeo and Juliet	Riccardo Freda		
1964	Mondo Inferno	Antonio Margheriti	with Marco Vicario	Beat Records / BCM9587 / 2019
1964	Vita Di Michelangelo	Silverio Blasi		Kronos Records / KRONGOLD007 / 2014
1965	$100,000 for Ringo	Alberto De Martino		GDM / CD CLUB 7009 / 2002
1966	K.O. va e uccidi	Carlo Ferrero		Saimel Bandas Sonoras / 3998920 / 2011
1966	The Spy with Ten Faces	Alberto De Martino		Quartet Records / QR337 / 2018
1966	Kiss Kiss...Bang Bang	Duccio Tessari		Quartet Records / QR337 / 2018
1966	Django Shoots First	Alberto De Martino		GDM / GDM 4149 / 2012
1966	Special Mission Lady Chaplin	Alberto De Martino		Digitmovies / CDDM082 / 2007
1966	The Christmas That Almost Wasn't	Rossano Brazzi		Digitmovies / CDDM047 / 2006
1966	El Cisco	Sergio Bergonzelli		Digitmovies / CDDM073 / 2006
1967	Day of Violence	Alfonso Brescia		GDM / CD CLUB 7016 / 2003
1967	Lucky, the Inscrutable	Jesús Franco		Quartet Records / QR337 / 2018
1967	Dirty Heroes	Alberto De Martino		Beat Records / CDCR 86 / 2009
1968	Gentleman Killer	Giorgio Stegani	as George Finley	Digitmovies / CDDM036 / 2005
1968	Run, Man, Run	Sergio Sollima		Digitmovies / CDDM095 / 2007
1968	Bandits in Rome	Alberto de Martino	a.k.a. Bandits in Rome	Quartet Records / QR441 / 2021
1968	Phenomenal and the Treasure of Tutankhamen	Ruggero Deodato	as Roger Rockefeller	Digitmovies / CDDM079 / 2007
1968	The Last Mercenary	Mel Welles	as Dieter Müller	Beat Records / CDCR 32 / 1996
1969	99 Women	Jesús Franco		Digitmovies / CDDM034 / 2005
1969	Marquis de Sade: Justine	Jesús Franco		Digitmovies / CDDM268 / 2014
1969	Desert Assault	Mino Loy		Digitmovies / CDDM049 / 2006
1969	Carnal Circuit	Alberto De Martino	a.k.a. Femmine Insaziabili	Quartet Records / QR463 / 2021
1969	Flashback	Raffaele Andreassi		
1969	Geminus	Luciano Emmer		Edipan / PANCD2506 / 2014
1969	Zenabel	Ruggero Deodato		Saimel Bandas Sonoras / 3997610 / 2006
1969	Love Birds - Una strana voglia d'amare	Mario Caiano		GDM / GDM 4106 / 2007
1970	Eugenie… The Story of Her Journey into Perversion	Jesús Franco		Digitmovies / CDDM030 / 2005
1970	Land Raiders	Nathan Juran		Digitmovies / CDDM190 / 2011
1970	Nightmares Come At Night	Jesús Franco		Digitmovies / CDDM117 / 2008
1970	Arizona Colt Returns	Sergio Martino		Saimel Bandas Sonoras / 3998010 / 2007
1970	The Bloody Judge	Jesús Franco		Lucertola Media / LMCD 011 / 1998
1970	Count Dracula	Jesús Franco		Digitmovies / CDDM319 / 2022
1970	Adiós, Sabata	Gianfranco Parolini		Quartet Records / QR198 / 2015
1970	Have a Good Funeral, My Friend... Sartana Will Pay	Giuliano Carnimeo	as Anthony Ascott	Beat Records / CDCR 39 / 2005
1970	Apocalypse Joe	Leopoldo Savona		Beat Records / CDCR 45 / 1998
1970	Cloud of Dust... Cry of Death... Sartana Is Coming	Giuliano Carnimeo		Saimel Bandas Sonoras / 3997910 / 2007
1971	Christ from the ocean	Ramon Fernández		Digitmovies / CDDM159 / 2010
1971	And the Crows Will Dig Your Grave	Juan Bosch	as John Wood	Saimel Bandas Sonoras / 3998010 / 2007
1971	The Case of the Scorpion's Tail	Sergio Martino		Digitmovies / CDDM028 / 2004
1971	The Night Evelyn Came Out of the Grave	Emilio Miraglia		Digitmovies / CDDM040 / 2005
1971	Dead Men Ride	Aldo Florio		GDM / GDM 4150 / 2012
1971	Civilta Del Mediterraneo			Kronos Records / KRONGOLD039 / 2021
1972	When Women Lost Their Tails	Pasquale Festa Campanile		Digitmovies / DGST025 / 2017
1972	All the Colors of the Dark	Sergio Martino		Digitmovies / CDDM019 / 2004
1972	His Name Was Holy Ghost	Giuliano Carnimeo	as Anthony Ascott	Beat Records / CDCR 127 / 2014
1972	The French Sex Murders	Ferdinando Merighi		
1972	God in Heaven... Arizona on Earth	Juan Bosch	as John Wood	
1972	A Virgin Among the Living Dead	Jesús Franco		GDM / GDM 4150 / 2012
1972	Your Vice Is a Locked Room and Only I Have the Key	Sergio Martino		Digitmovies / CDDM016 / 2004
1972	The Case of the Bloody Iris	Giuliano Carnimeo		Digitmovies / CDDM013 / 2004
1972	My Horse, My Gun, Your Widow	Juan Bosch	as John Wood	
1972	The Red Queen Kills Seven Times	Emilio Miraglia		Cam Sugar / CS009RSD / 2022
1972	Ubalda, All Naked and Warm	Mariano Laurenti		Digitmovies / CDDM055 / 2006
1973	The Big Family	Tonino Ricci		Edipan / PAN CD 2504 / 1997
1973	A Full Day's Work	Jean-Louis Trintignant		GDM / GDM 2019 / 2019
1973	Man Called Invincible	Giuliano Carnimeo		Beat Records / CDCR 117 / 2012
1973	Forbidden to Know	Nadine Trintignant		Digitmovies / CDDM132 / 2009
1973	The Bloody Vultures of Alaska	Harald Reinl		
1973	Eleonora	Silverio Blasi		Edipan / PAN CD 2507 / 2014
1973	My Name Is Shanghai Joe	Mario Caiano		GDM / GDM 4174 / 2014
1974	And Then There Were None	Peter Collinson		Digitmovies / CDDM320 / 2023
1975	Eyeball	Umberto Lenzi		Quartet Records / QR554 / 2024
1975	Manhunt in the City	Umberto Lenzi		Digitmovies / CDDM100 / 2007
1975	Then, The Train	Emilio Marsili		CAM / Digital / 2025
1977	Don Giovanni In Sicilia	Guglielmo Morandi		Kronos Records / KRONGOLD012 / 2015
1979	Caligula	Tinto Brass	as Paul Clemente	Cimmerian Records / CRCD023 / 2017
1982	Cammina, cammina	Ermanno Olmi		
