= The Night Evelyn Came Out of the Grave =

- Italian theatrical release poster
- Directed by: Emilio Miraglia
- Screenplay by: Massimo Felisatti; Fabio Pittorru; Emilio P. Miraglia
- Story by: Massimo Felisatti; Fabio Pittorru
- Produced by: Antonio Sarno
- Starring: Anthony Steffen; Marina Malfatti; Enzo Tarascio; Giacomo Rossi Stuart
- Cinematography: Gastone Di Giovanni
- Edited by: Romeo Ciatti
- Music by: Bruno Nicolai
- Production company: Phoenix Cinematografica
- Distributed by: Cineriz
- Release date: 18 August 1971 (Italy)
- Running time: 103 minutes
- Country: Italy
- Box office: ₤446.574 million

The Night Evelyn Came Out of the Grave (Italian: La notte che Evelyn uscì dalla tomba) is a 1971 Italian gothic film directed by Emilio Miraglia.

== Plot ==
Alan (Anthony Steffen) is a wealthy aristocrat who has just been released from a mental institution following the death of his wife, the red-haired Evelyn. Having caught Evelyn making love with an unknown man prior to his institutionalization, the psychotic Alan begins luring red-haired strippers and prostitutes to his home to torture and kill them, as a way to deal with his grief and inability to get revenge on his deceased wife.

Alan attends a séance in which the medium contacts Evelyn, causing Alan to faint. George Harriman (Enzo Tarascio) – Alan's cousin and his only living heir – offers to move into the mansion to take care of him. George takes him to a strip club and Alan takes home Susan (Erika Blanc), one of the strippers at the club who disappears after barely escaping with her life. Afterward, George suggests that Alan would be cured of his instability if he replaces Evelyn with a new bride that resembles her. On his advice, Alan moves to London to get away from his home and marries Gladys (Marina Malfatti), a blonde.

Gladys finds herself being haunted by the strange goings-on at her new home and being shunned by Evelyn's brother and Alan's invalid aunt, whom Alan has taken in as staff at his mansion. Gladys tells Alan her suspicions that Evelyn faked her death to escape Alan and run away with her lover. Alan's mental state continues to unravel as Evelyn's brother and Alan's aunt are each killed by a mysterious killer. When he sees a zombified Evelyn beckoning to him from her tomb, he breaks down completely.

When Alan is taken away for permanent institutionalization, Gladys and George celebrate, as they had been trying to push Alan back into insanity, with George supposedly impersonating Evelyn, so that he would gain control of Alan's fortune and estate. After they toast their success, Susan appears. George reveals that Susan was the one impersonating Evelyn and that the champagne Gladys is drinking has been poisoned. He stands by as Gladys attacks and kills Susan before succumbing to the poison.

However, Alan appears along with Richard Timberlane (Giacomo Rossi Stuart), the doctor who treated him for his first mental breakdown. Alan had suspected he was being manipulated all along and had faked his most recent breakdown to lure out the members of the conspiracy against him. George tries to escape and in the ensuing fight, a bag of sulfur-based fertilizer falls into the nearby pool. The water in the pool becomes acidic and George falls in, getting burned horribly. Getting out of the pool, George is arrested and Alan manages to get away with his crimes.

== Cast ==
- Anthony Steffen as Lord Alan Cunningham
- Marina Malfatti as Lady Gladys Cunningham
- Enzo Tarascio as George Harriman
- Erika Blanc as Susie
- Giacomo Rossi Stuart as Dr. Richard S. Timberlane
- Roberto Maldera as Groundskeeper Albert
- Joan C. Davies as Aunt Agatha Cunningham
- Umberto Raho as Farley Cunningham
- M. Teresa Toffano as Polly
- Ettore Bevilacqua as The Undertaker
- Paola Natale as Lady Evelyn Cunningham

== Style ==
Italian film historian Roberto Curti described the film as an example of a hybrid of a Gothic film and the rising popularity of Dario Argentoesque giallo films. Curti noted the Gothic elements combined with the elements of a castle, a crypt, a séance, and a vengeful ghost evoked by a portrait that haunts the main character.

== Production ==
The Night Evelyn Came Out of the Grave was written by screenwriters, Massimo Felisatti and Fabio Pittorru who had previously worked together on the television miniseries Qui squadra mobile. This film was their second giallo film after The Weekend Murders based on a story by Sergio Donati.

== Release ==
The Night Evelyn Came Out of the Grave was released in Italy on 18 August 1971 where it was distributed by Cineriz. The film grossed a total of 446,574,000 Italian lire on its domestic release. Curti described its profits in Italy as a "reasonable success". In the UK, the film was retitled The Night She Rose from the Tomb and released by Miracle Films in 1973, where it appeared on a double bill with Cold Blooded Beast.

It was released theatrically in the United States on 26 July 1972 as The Night Evelyn Came Out of the Grave. When shown theatrically in the United States, it was distributed with such gimmicks as theaters serving "bloodcorn", popcorn that had been dyed red. Several versions of the film circulated which were often edited and/or re-edited, such as the television version titled Evelyn Raises the Dead.

=== Home video ===
The film was first released on Blu-ray by Australian distribution company Gryphon Entertainment on 20 June 2013. The film was again released, with wider distribution, by Arrow Films on 30 May 2016 as part of the two-film Emilio P. Miraglia DVD/Blu-ray combo set Killer Dames (AV053). The other film on this release was The Red Queen Kills Seven Times, a similar film also directed by Miraglia.

== Critical reception ==
On the review aggregator website Rotten Tomatoes, 40% of 5 critics' reviews are positive. AllMovie wrote "The Night Evelyn Came Out of the Grave might make acceptable fodder for giallo fans but isn't as memorable as its reputation suggests."
