= Fabio Pittorru =

Italian film director, screenwriter and writer

- Born: 24 August 1928; Ferrara, Kingdom of Italy
- Died: 4 September 1995 (aged 67); Rome, Italy
- Occupation: Writer

Fabio Pittorru (24 August 1928 – 4 September 1995) was an Italian novelist, essayist, screenwriter, journalist and film director.

== Biography ==
Born in Ferrara, after the World War II Pittorru was very active in the local cultural scene, working as a documentarist and as a journalist. In the mid-1960s he moved to Rome, where he started a proficuous collaboration with Massimo Felisatti, writing some successful giallo novels and several film screenplays. He was also very active on television, co-creating with Felisatti the crime TV-series Qui squadra mobile, and writing a number of screenplays for television films. In 1975, he wrote and directed the commedia sexy all'italiana Strip First, Then We Talk.

Pittorru's literary works include biographies, historic essays and humorous novels.

== Selected filmography ==
- Blow Hot, Blow Cold, directed by Florestano Vancini (1970)
- The Weekend Murders, directed by Michele Lupo (1970)
- When Men Carried Clubs and Women Played Ding-Dong, directed by Bruno Corbucci (1971)
- The Night Evelyn Came Out of the Grave, directed by Emilio P. Miraglia (1971)
- Shadows Unseen, directed by Camillo Bazzoni (1972)
- The Red Queen Kills Seven Times, directed by Emilio P. Miraglia (1972)
- Fiorina la vacca, directed by Vittorio De Sisti (1972)
- The Sicilian Checkmate, directed by Florestano Vancini (1972)
- Last Days of Mussolini, directed by Carlo Lizzani (1974)
- The Body, directed by Luigi Scattini (1974)
- Silent Action, directed by Sergio Martino (1975)
- Calling All Police Cars, directed by Mario Caiano (1975)
- Waves of Lust, directed by Ruggero Deodato (1975)
- Sexycop, directed by Duccio Tessari (1975)
- El Macho, directed by Marcello Andrei (1977)
- Nine Guests for a Crime, directed by Ferdinando Baldi (1977)

== Books ==
- Violenza a Roma, with Massimo Felisatti. Garzanti, 1973.
- Gli strateghi di Yalta, with Massimo Felisatti. Fabbri, 1974.
- La spartizione del mondo. Fratelli Fabbri, 1974.
- La Madama, with Massimo Felisatti. Garzanti, 1974.
- Per vincere ci vogliono i leoni. with Massimo Felisatti. Mondadori, 1977.
- Torquato Tasso: l'uomo, il poeta, il Cortigiano. Bompiani, 1982.
- Agrippina imperatrice: sorella di Caligola, moglie di Claudio, madre di Nerone. Camunia, 1986.
- Chi è senza peccato. Wilson, 1987.
- Ciano: i giorni contati. Leonardo, 1991.
- Il caso Vittoria Accoramboni. Net, 2004.
