= When Men Carried Clubs and Women Played Ding-Dong =

- Italian: Quando gli uomini armarono la clava e... con le donne fecero din don
- Directed by: Bruno Corbucci
- Screenplay by: Fabio Pittorru; Massimo Felisatti
- Starring: Antonio Sabàto Sr. Aldo Giuffrè; Vittorio Caprioli; Elio Pandolfi
- Cinematography: Fausto Zuccoli
- Edited by: Vincenzo Tomassi
- Music by: Giancarlo Chiaramello
- Release date: 1971
- Country: Italy
- Language: Italian

When Men Carried Clubs and Women Played Ding-Dong (Italian: Quando gli uomini armarono la clava e... con le donne fecero din don) is a 1971 film directed by Bruno Corbucci.

== Plot ==
While two prehistoric tribes are fighting against each other, Listra, a woman, is trying to persuade her 'husband' not to join the war. In order to achieve the same goal with their respective partners, the women of the tribe start a sex strike.

== Cast ==
- Antonio Sabato as Ari
- Aldo Giuffré as Gott
- Vittorio Caprioli as Gran Profe
- Nadia Cassini as Listra
- Howard Ross as Maci
- Elio Pandolfi as Lonno
- Lucretia Love as Lella
- Pia Giancaro as Bea
- Gisela Hahn as Sissi
- Elio Crovetto as the referee
- Valeria Fabrizi as the referee's wife
- Sandro Dori as Gork
- Vittorio Congia as Sunk
- Gerry Bruno as Runt
- Patrizia Adiutori as Lulla
- Ria De Simone as Malle
- Barbara Pignaton as Mella
- Enzo Maggio as Big Chief
- Mimmo Poli as Non
- Bruna Beani as Lep
- Annabella Incontrera as a prehistoric woman

== Production ==
The story is a free adaptation in Prehistoric times of two comedies by Aristophanes, Lysistrata and Women at the Thesmophoria The film was shot between Tor San Lorenzo and Tor Caldera, in the Lazio region, a location usually chosen by Corbucci and other directors for Spaghetti westerns.

== Critical response ==
A contemporary review in the "Segnalazioni Cinematografiche” saw in it

— a comedy with extremely poor ideas, and that relies upon the lowest kind of comic expedients.

A retrospective review of the English dubbed DVD version distributed by Cheezy Flicks states: "It's not particularly well dubbed, not particularly sexy, and not even nearly as funny as it seems to want to be. However, if you're into low-budget B-movies or you have some weird caveman fetish, then this could very well be the film for you" while a review of the 2003 DVD released by Something Weird Video finds that "As moviemaking, this is very basic stuff. Most of the film is shot on exterior sets of fairly well-dressed tribal camps. The lighting is basic and the 'scope screen allows directors Corbucci and Campanile to play the action loose. There aren't any special effects, and the actual content of the film is basically 30 hairy guys and sexy gals running around on some barren real estate. Ding Dong wants to be funny rather than outright sexy. There's enough nudity to go around, but most of the soft sex scenes cut away from the action, just as older films did. There's a gay 'interior decorator' typed caveman on hand for some cheap digs. If one is deeply into stupid comedy, there might be a laugh here. (...) The picture is just a big curiosity."
