= Massimo Felisatti =

Italian screenwriter and writer

- Born: 12 May 1932; Ferrara, Italy
- Died: 7 September 2016 (aged 84); Rome, Italy
- Occupations: Writer, director

Massimo Felisatti (12 May 1932 – 7 September 2016) was an Italian novelist, essayist, screenwriter, and director.

== Biography ==
Born in Ferrara, Felisatti graduated in Modern Letters, and then he started collaborating with some local newspapers, also directing the cultural magazine Ferrara. In 1966 he moved to Rome, where he first worked as translator and essayist. In the 1970s, he started a proficuous collaboration with the writer Fabio Pittorru, debuting with the successful giallo novel Violenza a Roma, and writing screenplays for numerous films and for the crime TV-series Qui squadra mobile.

Felisatti was also active as a film director, co-directing with Sergio Grieco the poliziottesco Terror in Rome (1976) and a segment of the anthology film Un altro mondo è possibile (2001).

== Screenplays ==
- Il primo premio si chiama Irene, directed by Renzo Ragazzi (1969)
- Blow Hot, Blow Cold, directed by Florestano Vancini (1970)
- The Weekend Murders, directed by Michele Lupo (1970)
- Quando gli uomini armarono la clava e... con le donne fecero din don, directed by Bruno Corbucci (1971)
- The Night Evelyn Came Out of the Grave, directed by Emilio P. Miraglia (1971)
- Shadows Unseen, directed by Camillo Bazzoni (1972)
- The Sicilian Checkmate, directed by Florestano Vancini (1972)
- The Body, directed by Luigi Scattini (1974)
- Silent Action, directed by Sergio Martino (1975)
- Calling All Police Cars, directed by Mario Caiano (1975)
- Nude per l'assassino, directed by Andrea Bianchi (1975)
- Sexycop, directed by Duccio Tessari (1975)
- Confessions of a Frustrated Housewife, directed by Andrea Bianchi (1976)
- Il disertore, directed by Giuliana Berlinguer (1983)
- La neve nel bicchiere, directed by Florestano Vancini (1984)
- Un uomo di razza, directed by Bruno Rasia (1989)
- Sulla spiaggia e di là dal molo, directed by Giovanni Fago (1999)
- L'appuntamento, directed by Veronica Bilbao La Vieja (2002)
- Amorfù, directed by Emanuela Piovano (2003)
- Pontormo – Un amore eretico, directed by Giovanni Fago (2004)
- E ridendo l'uccise, directed by Florestano Vancini (2005)

== Books ==
- Violenza a Roma, with Fabio Pittorru. Milan, Garzanti, 1973.
- Gli strateghi di Yalta, with Fabio Pittorru. Milan, Fabbri, 1974.
- La Madama, with Fabio Pittorru. Milan, Garzanti, 1974.
- Un delitto della polizia?. Milan, Bompiani, 1975.
- La nipote scomoda, with Bruno Gambarotta. Milan, Mondadori, 1977.
- Per vincere ci vogliono i leoni. with Fabio Pittorru, Milan, Mondadori, 1977.
- Qui squadra mobile. Milan, Garzanti, 1978.
- Agave, with Andrea Santini. Milan, Rizzoli, 1981.
- Isabella d'Este. Milan, Bompiani, 1982.
- Storia di Ferrara, terra d'acqua e di cielo. Milan, Camunia, 1986.
- O dolce terra addio, with Marco Leto. Milan, Rizzoli, 1987.
- Baruffino buffone. Ferrara, Liberty House, 1991.
- Tutta per gli occhi, in Carlo Bassi et al., Ferrara 1492-1992. Ferrara, Corbo, 1992. pp. 294–295.
- Corso di sceneggiatura, with Lucio Battistrada. Milan, Sansoni, 1993.
- Rosso su nero. Milan, Mondadori, 1996.
- A teatro con gli Estensi. Ferrara, Corbo, 1999.
- Sette colli in nero, anthology of short stories edited by Gian Franco Orsi. Milan, Alacran, 2006.
