= Seven Blood-Stained Orchids =

- Italian film poster
- Directed by: Umberto Lenzi
- Screenplay by: Roberto Gianviti; Umberto Lenzi
- Produced by: Lamberto Palmieri
- Starring: Antonio Sabato; Uschi Glas; Pier Paolo Capponi; Marisa Mell
- Cinematography: Angelo Lotti
- Edited by: Eugenio Alabiso
- Music by: Riz Ortolani
- Production companies: Flora Film S.r.l.; Rialto Film Preben Philipsen GmbH & Co. KG
- Distributed by: Variety Distribution
- Release date: February 24, 1972
- Running time: 92 minutes
- Countries: Italy; West Germany

Seven Blood-Stained Orchids (Italian: Sette orchidee macchiate di rosso) is a 1972 giallo film directed by Umberto Lenzi, who also co-wrote the screenplay.

== Plot ==
A killer is driving around the streets of Italy looking for a specific victim. The killer breaks into her home and kills her, before catching a glimpse of the woman's daughter, Ines, in a photograph before leaving. Later, he poses as an escort and kills her in a field. Elsewhere, Giulia Torresi is picking a dress for her marriage to Mario, a wealthy clothing designer, when she receives a mysterious call, who hangs up when asked their identity. That night, another mysterious call is received by a partygoer named Kathy. The caller is revealed to be close to the party. Kathy is later followed home and killed.

A now newlywed Giulia is attacked and presumably killed on a train. However, the funeral was staged in an attempt to catch the killer. Giulia is alive, but is unable to remember the face of her attacker. While the police suspect Mario, Giulia recognizes one of the previous victims as a fellow employee at the hotel she formerly worked at. A suspect is pinpointed by Giulia recalls a lover of said employee, who was outed to the police by Giulia for stealing from the hotel. The suspect, Rau is brutally interrogated by Vismara's fellow detectives. He proclaims his innocence, but fails to give a strong alibi.

Once free from recovery, Giulia second guesses herself and confesses to Mario that she thinks she's accused the wrong man. In the car, she notices that Mario suspiciously has the exact half moon plaque left behind at each murder scene. Giulia subsequently remembers a vague memory of a frequent guest at her hotel who shared a similar half moon on their key chain. She and Mario race over to the hotel where she had worked. They do not find out anything. Whilst driving back however, she remembers that the names of the previous guests must be legally kept in an official hotel register. They find that the page of the particular date she remembers had been suspiciously ripped out. The page is soon discovered and is looked over by Mario and Giulia. As it turns out, the mystery person, whom she remembers to be an American man's name, is missing. What is present is a list of women: Anita Ferri, Kathy Adams, Elena Marchi, Concetta de Rosa, Anna Sartori, as well as Ines and Giulia who had worked at the hotel.

After not being able to relax and have a proper honeymoon, Mario and Giulia return to Italy to carry out their own investigation, starting with paying the third woman on the list a visit. Said woman, Elena Marchi now resides at a home for the mentally unstable. Once they finally come across the home, Mario goes into the building while Giulia stays in the car. However, they are too late, as Elena is dead. Mario chases the figure into a dark corridor where he is slashed on his shoulder. After this, Giulia catches a lengthy glimpse of the killer as he is escaping. However, she is still unable to describe the murderer to the authorities. Suspicions are cast on Mario.

The following day, Vismara pays Concetta De Rosa a visit. He informs her that she might be in danger of being next. Mario, now strictly focused on finding the identity of the American man, goes to a sketch artist. A sketch is developed of the man, prompting Mario to go and see if anyone recognizes the sketch. These areas include a parish house where a friendly farsighted priest is introduced to the illustration. He draws a complete blank and sends Mario to a local hangout for artists. One student recognizes the man as a friend of someone named Barrett. Mario finds Barrett, who recognizes the sketch as someone named Frank Saunders. From what he understood, Frank got “hung up” on some girl and never saw him since. Mario realizes that one of the women on the list might be the girl. An odd circumstance comes up when the parish priest, briefly seen during Mario's investigation, informs the police that the teacher, Concetta de Rosa, had not attended church as usual. The police soon find her dead in a confession booth. The killer is subsequently dubbed "The Half Moon Maniac".

Mario receives a clue to where Frank Saunders might be located from an anonymous tipster. After going to the address stated, Mario finds out that his suspect, Frank Saunders, had died in an automobile accident two years prior. Anna Sartori, a name not explored much on the list, arrives in Italy only to be immediately confronted by the police. Her arrival is also being watched by The Half Moon Maniac. Anna's husband explains she experienced a traumatic event of sorts while briefly living in Italy. Meanwhile, Mario finds himself at the hospital where Frank had died. He meets with a professor who believes Frank's death was caused by someone else behind the wheel. The professor thinks that it is the woman he got hooked on.

With all this new information, Mario bursts into Barrett's home, believing he is somehow involved in the killings. He however finds Barrett drugged. He returns to the parish house to see if the priest knows the name of the minister who officiated Frank's funeral. Mario is hopeful that the minister will remember some of the people who had been in attendance at the funeral. The priest gets this information for him, but to no avail.

Anna, not able to do practically anything to ensure her safety, sends her identical twin sister, Maria, out to get the newspaper for her. Whilst doing so, she is mistaken for Anna and is killed. At this point, Giulia is sick of hiding out and hatches a plan to catch the murderer by announcing her state to the public. The plan goes sideways and she faints due to the shock. Now with the authorities trusting him, Mario takes them to his new favorite suspect, Barrett, who upon arrival had committed suicide. Mario, unsure whether or not this was actually a suicide, visits Anna. She is interrogated into admitting that she was indeed the driver during Frank's accident. She had left him to die in order for her husband to never find out about their affair. With this exposed, she identifies the only living relative of Frank's she knows, his brother. He was the one that gave Frank the half moon plaque. Mario realizes during said description this is a person he has met before.

Giulia, who is at home by herself, hears her record abruptly end and assumes it's Mario. After finding a half moon on her record player, she encounters the priest. Realizing he was the killer, she runs to her pool area where she is followed and confronted by the priest. He explains that the killings were sparked out of the fact that one of the many women on the list had to have been the one to abandon his brother and leave him to die in the car accident. He also reveals that he killed Barrett and staged it as a suicide in order to keep everyone off his trail. He begins to strangle her, but Mario arrives and drowns the vengeful clergy in the pool.

== Cast ==
- Antonio Sabàto as Mario Gerosa
- Uschi Glas as Giulia Torresi
- Pier Paolo Capponi as Inspector Vismara
- Rossella Falk as Elena Marchi
- Marina Malfatti as Kathy Adams
- Renato Romano as The Priest
- Claudio Gora as Raffaele Ferri
- Gabriella Giorgelli as Ines Tamborini / Toscana
- Aldo Barberito as Lieutenant Palumbo
- Bruno Corazzari as Barrett
- Franco Fantasia as Lieutenant Renzi
- Petra Schürmann as Concetta De Rosa
- Ivano Davoli as Dr. Palmieri
- Linda Sini as Wanda
- Nello Pazzafini as Giovanni Rau
- Carla Mancini as Anna's Maid
- Enzo Andronico as Hotel Director
- Fulvio Mingozzi as Agent
- Nestore Cavaricci as Agent
- Marisa Mell as Anna Sartori / Maria Sartori

== Production ==
Towards the 1970s, Umberto Lenzi began focusing his attention on poliziotteschi films and his contributions to making gialli began to deteriorate. The score in the film by Riz Ortolani borrows liberally from his previous scores, including So Sweet...So Perverse and Perversion Story.

The appearance of German actress Uschi Glas was imposed on by the German co-producers, who promoted the film as both a krimi film and an Edgar Wallace adaptation. Editor Clarissa Ambach is credited only in the German version of the film.

== Reception ==
Lenzi later declared the film to be "superbly shot" as well as having a "pendantic" story.

== Releases ==
There are several releases of the film on DVD, as well as a recent 2018 transfer to Blu-ray by Code Red.
