= Gloria Piedimonte =

Italian singer and actress (1955–2022)

- Born: 27 May 1955; Mantua, Lombardy, Italy
- Died: 6 January 2022 (aged 66); Mantua, Lombardy, Italy
- Other names: La Guapa
- Occupations: Singer; actress; dancer

Gloria Piedimonte (27 May 1955 – 6 January 2022), also known as La Guapa, was an Italian singer, actress, dancer, and television personality.

== Life and career ==
Piedimonte was born in Mantua, Italy, on 27 May 1955. After some minor film roles Piedimonte gained some popularity in 1978 appearing in the music show Discoring, in which she danced to the tune of the theme song "Baila Guapa", performed by Bus Connection. In the same year she released two singles, the disco music song "Uno" and the space music song "Ping Pong Space". The following year she starred in her only film as lead actress, Baila Guapa. After appearances in other films and in photonovelas, she brought out one more single in 1983, "Ma che bella serata". In the same period she posed in several hard-core magazines, such as Le Ore and Men, although not personally involved in sex scenes. In her late years she focused on painting, holding several solo exhibitions. She died from COVID-19 in Mantua on 6 January 2022, at the age of 66.

== Filmography ==
- Calling All Police Cars, directed by Mario Caiano (1975)
- Substitute Teacher, directed by Guido Leoni (1975)
- Oh, mia bella matrigna, directed by Guido Leoni (1976)
- Like Rabid Dogs, directed by Mario Imperoli (1976)
- Private Vices, Public Pleasures, directed by Miklós Jancsó (1976)
- Young, Violent, Dangerous, directed by Romolo Guerrieri (1976)
- Le seminariste, directed by Guido Leoni (1976)
- Terror in Rome, directed by Sergio Grieco (1976)
- Amore all'arrabbiata, directed by Carlo Veo (1977)
- La svastica nel ventre, directed by Mario Caiano (1977)
- Deadly Chase, directed by Franco Prosperi (1978)
- The Face with Two Left Feet, directed by Neri Parenti (1979)
- Kriminal Porno, directed by Melih Gülgen (1979)
- Baila Guapa, directed by Adriano Tagliavia (1979)

== Discography ==
Singles

- 1978 - "Ping Pong Space"/"Ping Pong Space (Instrumental Version)" (Durium, LD AL 8018, 7")
- 1978 - "Uno"/"Chi sei" (Durium, LD AL 8036, 7")
- 1983 - "Ma che bella serata"/"Torno stasera" (Gattocicova, GT 501, 7")
- 1983 - "Sogno in blu" (Melody Records, MR 068/069)
- 2013 - "Ma che bella serata" [New Version]
