= Calling All Police Cars =

1975 film

- Italian theatrical release poster
- Directed by: Mario Caiano; Eduardo Salerno (asst. dir.)
- Written by: Massimo Felisatti; Fabio Pittorru
- Produced by: Renato Angiolini; Capitol Cinematografica
- Starring: Antonio Sabàto
- Cinematography: Pier Luigi Santi
- Edited by: Romeo Ciatti
- Music by: Lallo Gori
- Distributed by: Stacofilm
- Release date: 28 August 1975
- Running time: 100 minutes
- Country: Italy
- Language: Italian

Calling All Police Cars (Italian: ...a tutte le auto della polizia..., literally "...To All the Police Cars") is a 1975 Italian giallo/poliziottesco film. It stars Antonio Sabàto, Gabriele Ferzetti and Enrico Maria Salerno. The film is very graphic for its time, with excessive gore and nudity. The screenplay was based on a novel called Violenza a Roma by Massimo Felisatti.

== Plot ==
Rome, Italy mid-70s. The sixteen-year-old daughter of a famous Roman surgeon is found dead in Lake Albano. The police suspect a pervert named Enrico Tummoli. After following one of the girl's classmates named Carla, the police discover an underage sex trafficking ring led by Dutchman Franz Hekker and an ex-government official. The gynecologist who was performing abortions for Hekker winds up dead with his throat slashed. Next Carla is murdered, as well as the pervert Tummoli who was blackmailing the murderer.

== Cast ==
- Antonio Sabàto as Fernando Solmi
- Enrico Maria Salerno as Carraro
- Gabriele Ferzetti as Professor Icardi
- Elio Zamuto as Professor Giacometti
- Ettore Manni as Enrico Tummoli
- Luciana Paluzzi as Giovanna Nunziante
- Bedy Moratti as Signora Icardi
- Gloria Piedimonte as Carla
- Adriana Falco as Fiorella
- Tino Bianchi as Commissario
- Margherita Horowitz as Antonietta
- Franco Ressel as The Gynecologist
- Andrea Lala as Attardi
- Marino Masé as Franz Pagano
- Ida Di Benedetto as Una Signora Alla Villa
- Ilona Staller as Una Prostituta Alla Villa
