= Joe Dakota =

Joe Dakota may refer to:

- Joe Dakota (1972 film), a Spaghetti Western film directed by Emilio Miraglia
- Joe Dakota (1957 film), an American Western film directed by Richard Bartlett
