= Felisatti =

Felisatti is an Italian surname. Notable people with the surname include:

- Gian Pietro Felisatti (1950–2022), Italian music producer and songwriter
- Massimo Felisatti (1932–2016), Italian novelist, essayist, screenwriter, and director
