= The Weekend Murders =

- Italian film poster
- Italian: Concerto per pistola solista
- Directed by: Michele Lupo
- Screenplay by: Fabio Pittorru; Massimo Felisatti; Sergio Donati
- Dialogue by: Sergio Donati
- Produced by: Antonio Mazza
- Starring: Anna Moffo; Ida Galli; Peter Baldwin; Lance Percival; Marisa Fabbri; Orchidea De Santis; Christopher Chittell; Beryl Cunningham; Giacomo Rossi Stuart; Gastone Moschin
- Cinematography: Guglielmo Mancori
- Edited by: Vincenzo Tomassi
- Music by: Francesco De Masi
- Production company: Jupiter Generale Cinematografica
- Distributed by: Fida Cinematografica (Italy); Metro-Goldwyn-Mayer (International)
- Release dates: 15 October 1970 (Italy); 7 June 1972 (United States)
- Running time: 98 minutes
- Country: Italy

The Weekend Murders (Italian: Concerto per pistola solista, lit. 'Concerto for Solo Pistol', also known as The Story of a Crime) is a 1970 Italian giallo film directed by Michele Lupo. Inspired by Agatha Christie's And Then There Were None, it is about a family at an English country house for the reading of a will, who are murdered one-by-one. It stars an ensemble cast, featuring Anna Moffo, Ida Galli, Peter Baldwin, Lance Percival, Orchidea De Santis, Chris Chittell, Beryl Cunningham, Giacomo Rossi Stuart and Gastone Moschin.

== Plot ==
A family goes to a British estate to hear the reading of a will and while there they are murdered one by one, beginning with the butler. The murders are investigated by a Scotland Yard detective and a bumbling local Police Sergeant.

== Cast ==
- Anna Moffo as Barbara Worth
- Gastone Moschin as Sergeant Aloysius Thorpe
- Ida Galli as Isabelle Carter
- Lance Percival as Inspector Grey
- Peter Baldwin as Anthony Carter
- Giacomo Rossi Stuart as Ted Collins
- Chris Chittell as Georgie Kemple
- Marisa Fabbri as Aunt Gladys Kemple
- Beryl Cunningham as Pauline Collins
- Quinto Parmeggiani as Lawrence Carter
- Orchidea De Santis as Evelyn, the maid
- Robert Hundar as Arthur, the valet
- Franco Borelli as Tom, the stranger
- Ballard Berkeley as Peter, the butler
- Richard Caldicot as Thornton, the lawyer
- Harry Hutchinson as Harry, the gardener

== Production ==
The filmed mainly on-location at Somerleyton Hall in Suffolk, both for interior and exterior shots. There are also several scenes at Somerleyton railway station.
