= Elio Pandolfi =

Italian actor and voice actor (1926–2021)

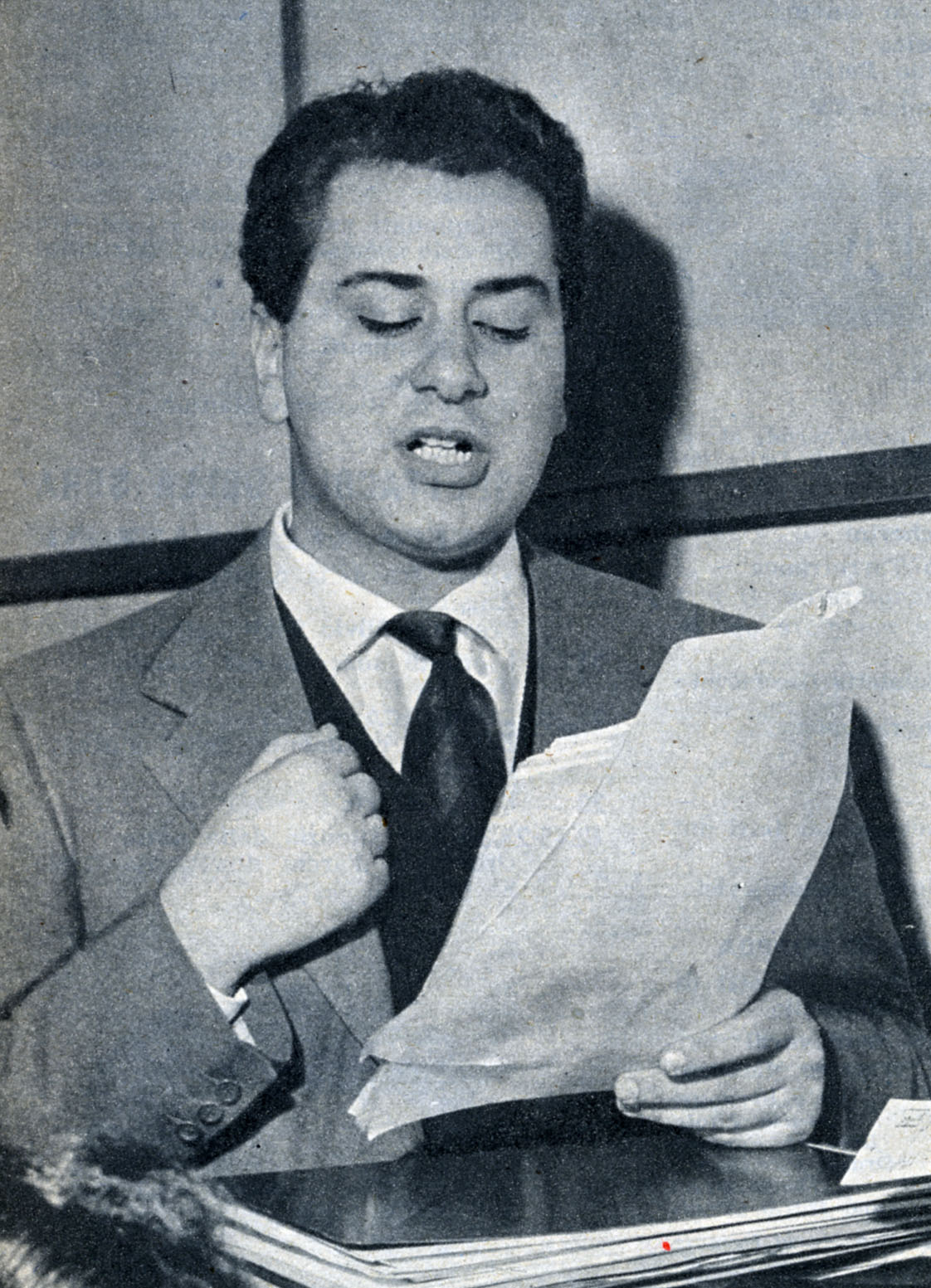
- Pandolfi in 1954
- Born: 17 June 1926; Rome, Kingdom of Italy
- Died: 11 October 2021 (aged 95); Rome, Italy
- Occupations: actor; voice actor; director

Elio Pandolfi (17 June 1926 – 11 October 2021) was an Italian stage, film and television actor, voice actor, and radio personality.

== Life and career ==
Born in Rome, Pandolfi got a degree in accounting, and then enrolled at the Silvio d’Amico Academy of Dramatic Arts graduating in 1948. He debuted on stage the same year, and was mainly active in theater, including operetta, musical theatre and revue. Pandolfi appeared as a character actor in a number of films, mainly in humorous roles, and was known for his skills as an impressionist, imitating other people (both men and women), foreign accents, and languages. Pursuing a career as a voice actor and dubber, he was renowned for his ability in dubbing even female roles effectively, which sometimes led him to provide post-syncronized dialogue of a few Italian actresses. With some help from Marcello Mastroianni, later described by Pandolfi as "the best friend I've ever had", he met and got to work with Federico Fellini, who hired him to voice many characters in films such as La dolce vita and 8½.

Pandolfi died on 11 October 2021, at the age of 95.

== Selected filmography ==
- In Olden Days (1951)
- Totò lascia o raddoppia? (1956)
- Son of the Red Corsair (1959)
- Tough Guys (1960)
- Obiettivo ragazze (1963)
- The Magnificent Adventurer (1964)
- For a Few Dollars Less (1966)
- The Most Beautiful Couple in the World (1968)
- When Men Carried Clubs and Women Played Ding-Dong (1971)
- Rugantino (1973)
- Too Much Romance... It's Time for Stuffed Peppers (2004)

== Voice work ==
Year	Title	Role	Notes	Ref
1963	Black Sabbath	Voice on the phone	Horror film, voice-over	
1981	Che casino... con Pierino!	Narrator	Comedy film	
1989	12 registi per 12 città	Narrator	Documentary ("Verona" segment)	
2004	Leo the Lion	Camea	Animated film	
2005	Yo-Rhad - Un amico dallo spazio	Merope	Animated film	
2006	Tormenti - Film disegnato	Tarantinellis, commissioner, porter, La Merz, Spanish guard, English officer	Animated film	
