= All the Colors of the Dark =

1972 film by Sergio Martino

- Italian theatrical release poster
- Italian: Tutti i colori del buio
- Directed by: Sergio Martino
- Screenplay by: Ernesto Gastaldi; Sauro Scavolini
- Story by: Santiago Moncada
- Produced by: Mino Loy; Luciano Martino
- Starring: George Hilton; Edwige Fenech; Ivan Rassimov; Julián Ugarte Landa; George Rigaud; Susan Scott; Marina Malfatti
- Cinematography: Miguel F. Mila; Giancarlo Ferrando
- Edited by: Eugenio Alabiso
- Music by: Bruno Nicolai
- Production companies: Lea Film; National Cinematografica; C.C. Astro
- Distributed by: Interfilm (Italy); Aitor Films (Spain)
- Release dates: 28 February 1972 (Italy); 27 August 1973 (Spain)
- Running time: 94 minutes
- Countries: Italy; Spain
- Language: Italian
- Box office: ₤294.5 million

All the Colors of the Dark (Italian: Tutti i colori del buio), also released as Day of the Maniac and They're Coming to Get You!, is a 1972 giallo film directed by Sergio Martino from a screenplay co-written by Ernesto Gastaldi, and starring Edwige Fenech, George Hilton, Ivan Rassimov, Nieves Navarro, Marina Malfatti and George Rigaud. Fenech portrays a troubled London woman who becomes involved in a Satanic cult.

This was the fourth giallo directed by Martino, and the second collaboration between the director and Fenech. An Italian and Spanish co-production, it premiered on 28 February 1972.

== Plot ==
Jane Harrison lives in London with her boyfriend Richard Steele, a pharmaceutical salesman often away on business trips. After losing her unborn child in a car accident, Jane has been unable to engage in sex with Richard, while still dealing with the trauma of witnessing her mother's murder at a young age. Despite Richard's skepticism of psychiatry, Jane's sister Barbara takes her to consult a psychiatrist, Dr. Burton, for whom Barbara works. Jane tells Dr. Burton that she has been having nightmares of a sinister man with piercing blue eyes murdering her mother, insisting that she has just seen the same man in the waiting room.

After encountering the blue-eyed man twice on her way back home, Jane meets Mary, a mysterious woman who recently moved into her apartment building. Jane confides her troubles to Mary, and the blue-eyed man later tries to kill Jane with an axe. Under the guise of helping Jane overcome her trauma, Mary takes her to a castle where a Satanic cult led by J.P. McBrian is performing a Black Mass. J.P. sacrifices a puppy and has Jane drink its blood, before forcing himself on her while surrounded by the other members. That night, Jane and Richard reignite their sex life. While out with Richard the next day, Jane spots the blue-eyed man and flees in a taxi.

Jane continues to attend the cult's rituals, but is horrified when the latest ritual results in Mary's sacrifice. After Jane awakens in a field, the blue-eyed man, Mark Cogan, brings her back to J.P., who explains that Mary allowed herself to be sacrificed after bringing Jane in as a novice, as it is the only way to leave the cult. Attempting to flee, Jane is attacked by two German Shepherds before Mark sedates her. Jane awakens in her own bed and rushes to Mary's apartment, now occupied by an elderly woman.

One night, while Richard and Barbara are both out of town, an increasingly disturbed Jane visits Dr. Burton's office and tells him about the recent events. Despite dismissing the events as nightmares, Dr. Burton allows Jane to spend the night at his country house with an elderly couple who work as housekeepers. The next day, when Richard returns to find that Jane is not home, he alerts Barbara by phone. Meanwhile, Jane awakens and is horrified to find that the housekeepers have been murdered. She frantically calls Dr. Burton, who is in his office with Richard and Barbara. Dr. Burton privately tells Barbara it was Jane on the phone. As Dr. Burton drives off to his country house, Richard follows him.

Mark finds Jane, revealing that her mother was a member of the cult and that she was killed after trying to escape. After Jane finds Dr. Burton murdered in his car, Mark chases her through the woods and attempts to kill her, but Richard fatally stabs him with a pitchfork, noticing a tattoo on Mark's wrist. Richard confronts Barbara at her apartment, having noticed that she has the same tattoo as Mark's on her arm. While secretly reaching for a gun, Barbara attempts to persuade Richard to join the cult, but as she leans in for a kiss, he shoots her dead with the gun.

At the hospital, Jane has a nightmare in which she is framed by the cult for Richard's murder, with J.P. posing as a police inspector. After she awakens, the police inform Jane and Richard that the cult was a cover-up for a drug ring, and that Barbara was the mastermind behind the cult. They also reveal that the man who murdered Jane and Barbara's mother died two months earlier and left an inheritance to both sisters; Barbara was planning to kill Jane to claim the inheritance all for herself. When Jane and Richard return home, J.P. attacks Richard, blaming him for Barbara's death. Richard chases J.P. up to the rooftop, where J.P. attacks Jane. Richard throws J.P. off the rooftop, killing him.

== Cast ==
- George Hilton as Richard Steele
- Edwige Fenech as Jane Harrison
- Ivan Rassimov as Mark Cogan
- Julián Ugarte as J.P. McBrian
- George Rigaud as Dr. Burton
- Nieves Navarro (credited as Susan Scott) as Barbara Harrison
- Maria Cumani Quasimodo as elderly neighbor
- Marina Malfatti as Mary Weil
- Luciano Pigozzi (credited as Alan Collins) as Lawyer Franciscus Clay
- Dominique Boschero as Jane's mother
- Renato Chiantoni as Mr. Main
- Tom Felleghy as Inspector Smith

== Production ==
The exteriors were filmed in London and West Sussex, England. Martino originally considered shooting in Dublin due to the lower production costs in Ireland, but was unable to find a suitable flat location. The occultist's manor was Wykehurst Place. Other locations included Kenilworth Court (Jane and Richard's flat), Aldwych tube station, Bishops Park, and the Anchor pub. Studio interiors were shot at De Paolis Studios in Rome.

== Release ==
All the Colors of the Dark was released in Italy on 28 February 1972 by Interfilm. The film grossed a total of 294,470,000 Italian lire domestically.

In Spain, the film was released on 27 August 1973 under the title Todos los colores de la oscuridad.

== Critical reception ==
Robert Firsching of AllMovie called the film "tiresome".
