= Assassination (1967 film) =

- Theatrical release poster
- Directed by: Emilio Miraglia
- Written by: Emil Bridge; Lou Stateman; Luciano Ercoli (as Andy Colbert); Massimo De Rita (as Max Hatired)
- Starring: Henry Silva; Fred Beir; Evelyn Stewart; Peter Dane; Bill Vanders
- Cinematography: Erico Menczer
- Edited by: Sergio Montanari
- Music by: Robby Poitevin
- Production companies: Cinegai S.p.A. Jolly Film
- Release date: 18 August 1967 (Italy)
- Running time: 95 minutes
- Country: Italy
- Language: Italian

Assassination is a 1967 Italian thriller-spy film starring Henry Silva. It marked the directorial debut of Emilio Miraglia.

== Plot ==
A Secret Service agent, supposedly dead, discovers that his wife is planning to marry the double agent he must expose.

== Cast ==
- Henry Silva as John Chandler / Philip Chandler
- Fred Beir as Bob
- Evelyn Stewart as Barbara
- Peter Dane as Lang
- Bill Vanders as Thomas
- Alfredo Varelli as Morrison (credited as Fred Farrell)
- Roberto Maldera as Otto (credited as Bob Molden)
- Karl-Heinz Menzinger as Hans (credited as Karl Menzinger)
- Gunther Scholtz as Senator
- Gert von Zitzewitz as Baron

== Reception ==
The Italian film critic Francesco Puma described the film as "ambiguous, crepuscular and uneasy" and as a Eurospy version of The Late Mattia Pascal.
