= Sexycop =

- Directed by: Duccio Tessari
- Screenplay by: Massimo Felisatti; Fabio Pittorru; Duccio Tessari
- Based on: La Madama by: Massimo Felisatti; Fabio Pittorru
- Produced by: Giorgio Venturini
- Starring: Christian De Sica; Ines Pellegrini; Oreste Lionello; Ettore Manni; Gigi Ballista; Maria Grazia Spina; Nazzareno Zamperla; Lorella De Luca; Alessandra Panaro; Francesco De Rosa; Tom Skerritt; Carole André
- Cinematography: Giulio Albonico
- Edited by: Mario Morra
- Music by: Manuel De Sica
- Production company: Filmes Cinematographica
- Distributed by: Titanus
- Release date: 16 January 1976 (Italy)
- Running time: 94 minutes
- Country: Italy

Sexycop (Italian: La Madama) 1976 Italian crime comedy film directed by Duccio Tessari. It is based on the novel with the same name written by Massimo Felisatti and Fabio Pittorru.

== Cast ==
- Christian De Sica as Vito Militiello
- Carole André as "La Madama"
- Tom Skerritt as Jack
- Ines Pellegrini as Irma
- Oreste Lionello as Inspector Solmi
- Ettore Manni as Sante Tonnaro
- Gigi Ballista as The Venetian
- Francesco De Rosa as Squillace

== Production ==
Sexycop was based on the novel La Madama written by Massimo Felisatti and Fabio Pittorru. The term Madama itself, was a Rome-based slang for Italy's mobile police, similar to the English slang "the fuzz". The book was the third in a series of novels and was adapted to film by director Duccio Tessari who turned the film into more of a comedy oriented film.

== Release ==
Sexycop was distributed theatrically in Italy by Titanus on 16 January 1976. It grossed a total of 173,627,420 Italian lire domestically. The film has also been released as La Madama l'agente Minchiello e il caso Patacchioni. Italian film historian Roberto Curti described the Italian box office as "disappointing".

== Reception ==
Curti stated that contemporary critics "ravaged the film". Corriere della Sera's Renato Palazzo found the film to be closer to "the childish comic-adventure series starring Bud Spencer and Terence Hill" noting that "this formula has been frayed for a long time." Orio Caldiron of La Rivista del cinematografo stated that although Tessari has never been a master filmmaker, wondered how far he could have lost his way with the film.

== See also ==
- List of Italian films of 1976
