= Antonio Sabàto Sr. =

Italian actor (1943–2021)

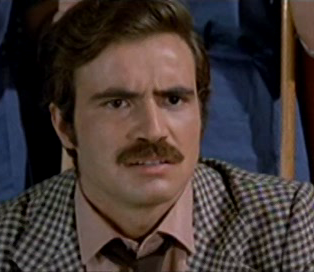
- Sabàto in Gang War in Milan (1973)
- Born: April 2, 1943; Montelepre, Sicily, Kingdom of Italy
- Died: January 10, 2021 (aged 77); Hemet, California, U.S.
- Occupation: Actor
- Years active: 1966–2006
- Children: 5, including Antonio Jr.

Antonio Sabàto Sr. (2 April 1943 – 10 January 2021) was an Italian actor, best known for his starring roles in Spaghetti Western and poliziotteschi films. He was nominated for the Golden Globe Award for New Star of the Year – Actor for his performance in Grand Prix (1966).

== Life and career ==
Sabàto was born in Montelepre, Sicily on 2 April 1943. He made his film debut at the age of 23 in the 1966 film Lo scandolo, with Anouk Aimée and Philippe Leroy.

That same year, Sabàto had his breakout role in the John Frankenheimer-directed Formula One racing drama Grand Prix, playing the hotshot Italian driver Nino Barlini. The film was both a critical and commercial success, becoming one of the highest-grossing films of 1966 and winning three Academy Awards. Sabàto was nominated for New Star of the Year – Actor at the 24th Golden Globe Awards.

Sabato subsequently starred in a string of Spaghetti Westerns. He was cast in a supporting role in the sci-fi film Barbarella (1968), but during filming he was recast with David Hemmings and all his scenes were reshot. Production stills of Sabato in the role still exist.

During the 1970s, Sabàto starred in numerous poliziotteschi films.

In 1985, Sabàto moved to the United States and retired to Southern California. He appeared opposite his son, actor Antonio Sabàto Jr., in the 1997 film High Voltage and on seven episodes of the soap opera The Bold and the Beautiful.

== Personal life ==
Sabàto married a Czech Jewish woman, Yvonne, in 1971. She was born in Prague (then part of Czechoslovakia) and was the daughter of a Holocaust survivor. They had two children together, a son, Antonio Jr, and a daughter, Simonne. They divorced sometime before 1997, when she remarried to California-based businessman George F. Kabouchy.

He became a naturalized United States citizen after moving to California in the 1980s.

=== Death ===
Sabàto died from complications of COVID-19 at a hospice in Hemet, California, on 10 January 2021 at age 77.

== Selected filmography ==
- Lo scandalo (1966) - Mauro
- Grand Prix (1966) - Nino Barlini
- Hate for Hate (1967, a.k.a. Odio per odio) - Miguel
- Shoot Twice (1968, Due volte Giuda) - Luke Barrett
- Beyond the Law (1968, Al di là della legge) - Ben Novack
- One Dollar Too Many (1968, I tre che sconvolsero il West / Vado, vedo e sparo) - Moses Lang
- The Lady of Monza (1969, a.k.a. La monaca di Monza) - Giampaolo Osio
- Diary of a Telephone Operator (1969, Certo, certissimo, anzi... probabile) - Carmelo
- Lovemaker (1969) - Giorgio Marelli
- Mafia Connection (1970, E venne il giorno dei limoni neri) - Rosario Inzulìa
- The Man with Icy Eyes (1971, a.k.a. L'uomo dagli occhi di ghiaccio) - Eddie Mills
- When Men Carried Clubs and Women Played Ding-Dong (1971) - Ari
- L'occhio del ragno (1971) - Paul Valéry / Frank Vogel
- Seven Blood-Stained Orchids (1972) - Mario
- I senza Dio (1972) - Roy, detto 'El Santo'
- Crime Boss (1972) - Antonio Mancuso
- Where the Bullets Fly (1972) - Jonathan 'Jeepo' Poe
- Gang War in Milan (1973) - Salvatore "Toto" Cangemi
- Questa volta ti faccio ricco! (1974) - Joe Esposito
- The Last Desperate Hours (1974, a.k.a. Milano: il clan dei calabresi) - Paolo Mancuso
- El clan de los Nazarenos (1975) - Jorge
- Calling All Police Cars (1975) - Commissario Fernando Solmi
- Crimebusters (1976) - Comm. Paolo Tosi
- Terror in Rome (1976) - Inspector De Gregori
- Four Billion in Four Minutes (1976) - Raffaele
- Return of the 38 Gang (1977) - Marshall Tinto Baragli
- Canne mozze (1977) - Giovanni Molet
- War of the Robots (1978) - Captain John Boyd
- The New Godfathers (1979) - Don Michele Vizzini
- Napoli... la camorra sfida, la città risponde (1979) - Vito
- La tua vita per mio figlio (1980) - Antonio Esposito
- Escape from the Bronx (1983) - Dablone / Toblerone
- Thunder Warrior (1983) - Thomas
- Zampognaro innamorato (1983) - Marito di Angela
- Tuareg: The Desert Warrior (1984, a.k.a. Tuareg – Il guerriero del deserto) - The Captain
- Thunder Squad (1985) - Martin Cuomo
- Bye Bye Vietnam (1988) - Razor
- High Voltage (1997) - Carlo
- The Bold and the Beautiful (2006, TV Series) – Aldo Damiano (final appearance)
