= Terror in Rome =

- Directed by: Sergio Grieco; Massimo Felisatti
- Screenplay by: Massimo Felisatti; Luigi Mordini; Giuseppe Maggi
- Story by: Massimo Felisatti; Sergio Grieco
- Starring: Antonio Sabàto
- Cinematography: Sergio Martinelli
- Edited by: Giancarlo Venarucci
- Music by: Lallo Gori
- Production company: David Film
- Distributed by: C.I.A.
- Release date: 12 August 1976 (Italy)
- Running time: 85 minutes
- Country: Italy
- Box office: ₤518.107 million

Terror in Rome (Italian: I violenti di Roma bene), also known as Violence for Kicks, is a 1976 Italian "poliziottesco" film. written and directed by Sergio Grieco and Massimo Felisatti, credited as Segri & Ferrara. It is loosely inspired by the Circeo massacre, in which three young men abducted, and then raped and tortured, two young women over a two-day period.

== Plot ==
A gang of bikers terrorize the streets of Rome.

== Cast ==
- Antonio Sabàto as Commissioner De Gregori
- Pierre Marfurt as Stefano Donini
- Cesare Barro as Bruno
- Franca Gonella as Marco's sister
- Pupo De Luca as Marshall Turrini
- Gianluca Farnese as Marco Liberatori
- Giuliana Melis as Giovanna
- Giacomo Rossi Stuart as Donini
- Gloria Piedimonte as Elena

== Production ==
Terror in Rome was filmed at Cave Film Studio in Rome and on location in Rome.

== Release ==
Terror in Rome was distributed theatrically in Italy by C.I.A. on 12 August 1976. The film grossed a total of 518,107,310 lire domestically. It was released in France in 1979 as La Nuit de excitcées with additional sex scenes.

== Reception ==
In his analysis of the film, Roberto Curti heavily criticized it, noting that "the story is stretched beyond belief" and that "the budget is so poor that Terror In Rome could well pass for a Turkish movie", and eventually complaining that "the film is so badly written and directed that it is hard to believe it came from such an experienced filmmaker as Grieco and a renowned writer as Felisatti."

== See also ==
- List of Italian films of 1976
