= The Fighting Fist of Shanghai Joe =

1973 film

- Directed by: Mario Caiano
- Screenplay by: Mario Caiano; Fabrizio Trifone Trecca
- Story by: Carlo Alberto Alfieri; Mario Caiano; Fabrizio Trifone Trecca (as T.F. Karter)
- Produced by: Renato Angiolini; Roberto Bessi
- Starring: Chen Lee; Carla Romanelli; Gordon Mitchell; Piero Lulli; Katsutoshi Mikuriya; Giacomo Rossi-Stuart; Robert Hundar; Klaus Kinski
- Cinematography: Guglielmo Mancori
- Edited by: Amedeo Giomini
- Music by: Bruno Nicolai
- Production companies: C.B.A. Produttori e Distributori Associati; Compagnia Cinematografica Champion
- Distributed by: Jumbo Cinematografica
- Release date: 28 December 1973
- Running time: 98 minutes
- Country: Italy
- Language: Italian

The Fighting Fist of Shanghai Joe (Italian: Il mio nome è Shanghai Joe, lit. "My name is Shanghai Joe") is a 1973 spaghetti Western kung fu film directed by Mario Caiano and starring Chen Lee as Shanghai Joe. It was released under alternate titles in the United States, including To Kill or to Die and The Dragon Strikes Back.

== Plot ==
A Chinese immigrant named Chin Hao who skilled in martial arts arrives in America and travels to Texas looking for honest work. Wherever he goes he encounters racism. He soon impinges on the interests of a slave trader called Spencer, which results in a price being put on his head. Earning a nickname "Shanghai Joe", Chin Hao uses his martial arts expertise to free the Mexican slaves from their cruel master. Spencer and his friends then hire the four most terrifying bounty hunters of the West, among them a cannibal, a scalp hunter, a killer who skins his victims, and another martial arts champion, his old friend Mikuja.

== Cast ==
- Chen Lee (Myoshin Hayakawa) - Chin Hao/Shanghai Joe
- Carla Romanelli - Cristina
- Gordon Mitchell - Buryin' Sam
- Klaus Kinski - Scalper Jack
- Katsutoshi Mikuriya - Mikuja
- Robert Hundar - Pedro, the Cannibal
- Giacomo Rossi-Stuart - Triky, the gamber
- Piero Lulli - Spencer
- Carla Mancini - Conchita
- George Wang - Yang
- Rick Boyd - Slim
- Umberto D'Orsi - Poker player
- Dante Maggio - Doctor
- Francisco Sanz - Cristina's Father

== DVD release ==
On May 26, 2009, a Region 0 DVD of the movie was released by Alpha Video.
