= The Body (1974 film) =

- Directed by: Luigi Scattini
- Written by: Massimo Felisatti; Fabio Pittorru; Luigi Scattini
- Cinematography: Antonio Borghesi
- Music by: Piero Umiliani
- Release date: 1974
- Language: Italian

The Body (Italian: Il corpo) is a 1974 Italian erotic drama film written and directed by Luigi Scattini.

== Plot ==
In Trinidad, Princess arouses a violent passion in two men, the young penniless Alan and the mature and alcoholic Antoine.

== Cast ==
- Zeudi Araya as Princess
- Enrico Maria Salerno as Antoine
- Leonard Mann as Alan
- Carroll Baker as Madeliene

== See also ==
- List of Italian films of 1974
