= Shadow of Illusion =

- Italian film poster. Art by Tino Avelli.
- Directed by: Mario Caiano
- Screenplay by: Enrico Rossetti; Frank Agrama; Mario Caiano
- Story by: Enrico Rossetti; Frank Agrama; Mario Caiano
- Produced by: Nino Milano
- Starring: William Berger; Daniela Giordano; Krista Nell; Antonio Cantafora
- Cinematography: Enrico Menczer
- Edited by: Tatiana Casini Morigi
- Music by: Carlo Savina
- Production company: Liger
- Distributed by: Icar
- Release date: 1970
- Running time: 95 minutes
- Country: Italy
- Language: Italian
- Box office: ₤20.525 million

Shadow of Illusion (Italian: Ombre roventi) is an Italian film directed by Mario Caiano. The film stars William Berger, Daniela Giordano and Krista Nell. It is about a fashion model named Gail Bland who travels to Cairo where she meets a mysterious man named Caleb. Bland then runs into a cult of hippies who worship Osiris and make human sacrifices.

The film was shot at Cinecittà and on location in Egypt. The film had a troubled production history being shot during the War of Attrition in Egypt and with cast members signing on shortly before production (William Berger) and the female lead being replaced with Daniela Giordano during the first day of production. The release date in Italy of Shadow of Illusion is unclear, with Associazione Nazionale Industrie Cinematografiche Audiovisive e Multimedia (ANICA) dating the first public screening of the film to be April 16, 1972 while La Stampa wrote about a screening as early as 1971.

== Cast ==
- William Berger as Caleb
- Daniela Giordano as Gail Bland
- Krista Nell as Sekhmet
- Antonio Cantafora as Seth
- Mirella Pamphili
- Enzo Maggio

== Production ==
Director Mario Caiano began work on Shadow of Illusion right after his film Love Birds – Una strana voglia d'amare. The film began production under the original title Le ombre. Caiano recalled that the film had a strange production with producers who were not seen before or after production. Caiano was promised by the producers an actor that was internationally known for the film, but did not get him. William Berger was shooting La colomba non deva volare in Egypt at the time and got in contact to star in the film. Other members of Berger's family joined the cast including his daughter and his wife Carol Lobravico.

Shadow of Illusion was shot at Cinecittà studios in Rome and on location in Egypt. Daniela Giordano became the lead actress after the initial lead left production after the first day of shooting. Caiano said the original lead for the film was Luciana Paluzzi while Giordano insists the actress was Gianna Serra. Shooting was during the War of Attrition where Egypt was at war with Israel making production difficult. While filming in the desert, the crew had to be escorted by soldiers who would turn of the lights in case of air raids.

Caiano claimed he never watched a completed version of the film and only finished a rough cut of it.

== Release ==
Film historian Roberto Curti described the film as having a "troubled commercial life." The film was submitted to the Italian Board of Censors in April 1970 with the title Le Ombre Roventi. The Italian release date of the film is unclear. The Associazione Nazionale Industrie Cinematografiche Audiovisive e Multimedia (ANICA) date the first public screening of the film to be April 16, 1972 while the newspaper La Stampa records the film being released in Imperia on July 13, 1971. Publicity material for the film is dated October 1970. The film was distributed by Icar and grossed 25,525,000 Italian lire in Italy.

The film has been released as Shadow of Illusion on what Curti described as a "badly panned-and-scanned English-language copy of a Japanese laserdisc".
