= The Red Queen Kills Seven Times =

- Italian theatrical release poster
- Directed by: Emilio Miraglia
- Screenplay by: Fabio Pittorru; Emilio P. Miraglia
- Story by: Fabio Pittorru
- Starring: Barbara Bouchet; Ugo Pagliai; Marina Malfatti; Sybil Danning
- Cinematography: Alberto Spagnoli
- Edited by: Romeo Ciatti
- Music by: Bruno Nicolai
- Production companies: Phoenix Cinematografica; Romano Film G.M.B.H.; Traian Boeru
- Distributed by: Cineriz
- Release date: 18 August 1972 (Italy)
- Running time: 98 minutes
- Countries: Italy; West Germany
- Box office: ₤513.725 million

The Red Queen Kills Seven Times (Italian: La dama rossa uccide sette volte) is a 1972 giallo film directed by Emilio Miraglia.

== Plot ==
Two sisters, Kitty and Evelyn, are cursed by a family painting depicting a hundred year-cycle in which a Red Queen is raised from the dead to kill seven times. Hoping to end the cycle, their grandfather, Tobias, orders the painting removed from their sight. Years later, Kitty accidentally kills Evelyn during a fight. Their older cousin, Franziska, covers up the death, and everyone, including Tobias, is told that Evelyn immigrated to the United States. This doesn't sit well with Kitty, who is willing to allow Franziska to cover up the murder but feels overwhelming guilt. When their grandfather dies from a fear-induced heart attack, a series of murders begin to occur around Kitty, all of which appear to have been caused by a red-cloaked Evelyn. The police begin to suspect that Kitty and her married lover Martin are the perpetrators of the murders, especially after Martin's institutionalized wife is found dead. It's eventually revealed that Kitty had only stunned Evelyn, who was also not her biological sister–Tobias had adopted her as an additional way of ending the hundred year-cycle. Evelyn's true murderer was Franziska, who murdered her at the start of an impulsive plan to be the only person to inherit Tobias' vast fortune. Resentful that she was not the main beneficiary despite providing his daily care, Franziska recruited some of Kitty's co-workers, who were unhappy with Kitty's station and preferential treatment by Martin. After murdering her female accomplices (while also trying to frame one of them, Rosemary, by dressing her up as the Red Queen, which was also the one to reveal so to Kitty), Franziska tricks Kitty into entering the basement of Tobias' mansion, where she tries to slowly drown her via flooding. Realizing the truth, Martin confronts Franziska and gets a confession, only for the woman to be shot by her own husband, Herbert, who had thus far been complicit with her actions. Before dying, Franziska stabs Martin with a dagger she has hidden in her coat. Herbert then leads the police to Kitty's location, saving her from death but drowning himself in the process. Kitty and Martin are taken to the hospital.

== Cast ==
- Barbara Bouchet as Kitty Wildenbrück
- Ugo Pagliai as Martin Hoffmann (credited as Hugh Patrick)
- Marina Malfatti as Franziska Wildenbrück
- Marino Masé as Inspector Toller
- Pia Giancaro as Rosemary Müller (credited as Maria Pia Giancaro)
- Sybil Danning as Lulù Palm
- Nino Korda as Herbert Zieler
- Rudolf Schündler as Tobias Wildenbrück (credited as Rudolf Schindler)
- Fabrizio Moresco as Peter
- Carla Mancini as Elizabeth Hoffmann
- Bruno Bertocci as Hans Meyer

== Production ==
The Red Queen Kills Seven Times was the final film of director Emilio Miraglia and his second giallo film in a row. The film was predominantly shot in Würzburg and Weikersheim in Germany.

== Release ==
The Red Queen Kills Seven Times was distributed theatrically in Italy by Cineriz on 18 August 1972. The film grossed a total of 513,725,000 Italian lire in Italy. The German version of the film is 15 minutes shorter than the Italian release.

Arrow Films released a Region 2 DVD edition & a Region B Blu-ray edition for the British market on 17 April 2017.

== Critical reception ==
AllMovie called it a "standard but solid entry in the giallo genre."
