= Marina Malfatti =

Italian actress (1933–2016)

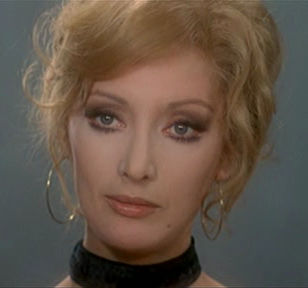
- Malfatti in the film All the Colors of the Dark (1972)
- Born: 25 April 1933; Florence, Kingdom of Italy
- Died: 8 June 2016 (aged 83); Rome, Italy
- Occupation: Actress
- Spouse: Umberto La Rocca

Marina Malfatti (25 April 1933 – 8 June 2016) was an Italian actress.

== Biography ==
Born in Florence, Malfatti moved to Paris at the age of 17 where she attended the Cours d'Art Dramatique, the drama school founded by René Simon. Two years later, after returning to Italy, she obtained a scholarship for the Centro Sperimentale di Cinematografia and started appearing in films and on stage in some small roles.

Her theater career was launched by Arnoldo Foà who chose her as his co-star in the play Two for the Seesaw by William Gibson. Hence Malfatti's stage career alternated comedic and dramatic roles.

During the 1970s, Malfatti was an icon of Italian horror films, especially of demonic background. In the 1980s, her career focused on theatre, and in 1986 Alberto Moravia wrote specifically for her the drama La cintura. In 1990 she began a critically acclaimed collaboration with stage director Luigi Squarzina.

Malfatti was married to the diplomat Umberto La Rocca.

== Selected filmography ==
- Le cameriere (1959) – Venerina
- A Mistress for the Summer (1960) – L'étrangère
- A Man for Burning (1962) – Wilma
- Outlaws of Love (1963) – Rosanna
- The Reckless (1965)
- Me, Me, Me... and the Others (1966) – Dancer
- Missione Wiesenthal (1967) – Anne Marie Mistelbach
- More Than a Miracle (1967) – Olimpia Capece Latro, princess Altamura
- Pronto... c'è una certa Giuliana per te (1967) – Annalisa
- Run, Psycho, Run (1968)
- I dannati della Terra (1969) – Luciana
- The Fourth Victim (1971) – Julie Spencer
- The Night Evelyn Came Out of the Grave (1971) – Gladys Cunningham
- Per amore o per forza (1971) – Nora
- Savage Guns (1971) – Marge (uncredited)
- Seven Blood-Stained Orchids (1972) – Kathy Adams
- All the Colors of the Dark (1972) – Mary Weil
- Decameron n° 3 – Le più belle donne del Boccaccio (1972) – Wife of Jealous Husband (segment "The Jealous Husband")
- The Red Queen Kills Seven Times (1972) – Franziska Wildenbrück
- The Return of Clint the Stranger (1972) – Norma Harrison
- Testa in giù... gambe in aria (1972)
- Alexander Zwo (1972, TV miniseries) – Sonja
- Sans sommation (1973) – Isabelle Maury
- The Bloodstained Lawn (1973) – Nina Genovese
- Man with the Golden Winchester (1973) – Carmen (uncredited)
- La notte dell'ultimo giorno (1973) – Francesca
- A Black Ribbon for Deborah (1974) – Deborah – wife of Michel
- The Balloon Vendor (1974) – Maria
- Lezioni di violoncello con toccata e fuga (1976) – Stella Brega
