= Joe Dakota (1971 film) =

- Directed by: Emilio Miraglia
- Written by: Jean Josipovici; Emilio Miraglia
- Starring: Richard Harrison; Jose Torres; Franca Polesello; Indio Gonzales; Rick Boyd; Antonio Cantafora
- Release date: May 10, 1971 (Italian)
- Running time: 87 minutes
- Country: Italy
- Language: Italian

Joe Dakota (also known as Spara Joe... e così sia!) is a 1971 Spaghetti Western film directed by Emilio Miraglia.

== Plot ==
Bandits track down a man named Joe who has a map to a fortune of stolen money taken in a bank robbery.
