= Pia Giancaro =

Italian actress and television personality

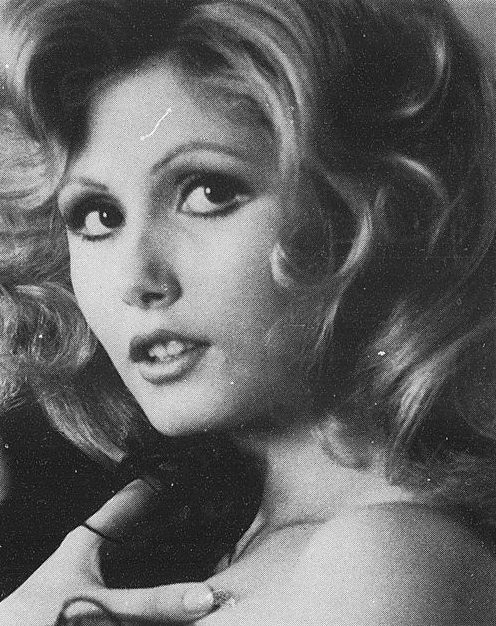
- Giancaro in a photo published by La Stampa, 6 May 1973
- Born: Maria Pia Gianporcaro; 12 March 1950 (age 76); Palermo, Italy
- Occupations: Actress; television personality
- Years active: 1970-

Pia Giancaro (born 12 March 1950) is an Italian former actress and television personality.

== Life and career ==
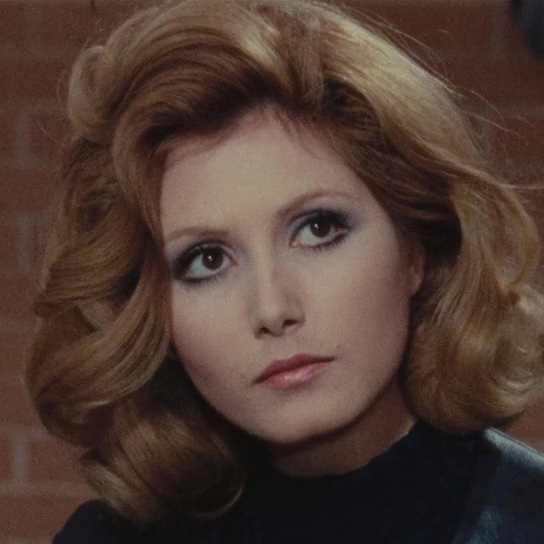
Giancaro in The Red Queen Kills Seven Times (1972)

Born Maria Pia Gianporcaro in Palermo, the daughter of a Sicilian railroad worker and a Slavic mother, Giancaro in 1968 won the Miss Sicily beauty contest and entered the Miss Italy competition. One year later she made her television debut alongside Corrado in the RAI quiz show A che gioco giochiamo?. Shorty later Giancaro started appearing in films, mainly in character roles.

== Personal life ==
Giancaro married the prince Lillio Sforza Marescotti Ruspoli and retired from show business.

== Filmography ==
=== Film ===
Year	Title	Role	Notes
1971	Return of Sabata	Diane (as Maria Pia Giancaro)	Drama western film
1971	Man of the Year	Friend of Coco	Comedy film
1971	Roma Bene	L'invitata in nude-look	
1972	Boccaccio	Monna Lisa	
1972	The Red Queen Kills Seven Times	Rosemary Muller (as Maria Pia Giancaro)	Crime horror mystery film
1973	The Bloody Hands of the Law	Lilly Antonelli	Crime film
1974	Il romanzo di un giovane povero	Margherita (as Maria Pia Giancaro)	Drama film
1975	Malocchio	Tanya	Crime horror film
1976	Geometra Prinetti selvaggiamente Osvaldo	Marisa Galbusera	Comedy film
1977	L'amantide	Annalisa Santoro	Drama film
2003	Tosca and the Women	Marchesa Attavanti (as Maria Pia Ruspoli)	Italian title: Tosca e altre due
2010	The Unseen World	Lady Cavendish	Biographical film
