= Qui squadra mobile =

- Title card
- Written by: Massimo Felisatti; Anton Giulio Majano; Fabio Pittorru
- Directed by: Anton Giulio Majano
- Starring: Orazio Orlando; Luigi Vannucchi
- Country of origin: Italy
- Original language: Italian
- No. of seasons: 2
- No. of episodes: 12

Original release
- Network: Programma Nazionale (1973) Rete 1 (1976)
- Release: May 8, 1973 – October 12, 1976

Qui squadra mobile is an Italian television series starring Orazio Orlando and Luigi Vannucchi. All 12 episodes were directed by Anton Giulio Majano and written by Massimo Felisatti, Anton Giulio Majano, and Fabio Pittorru.

== See also ==
- List of Italian television series
