= Desert Assault =

1991 video game

- U.S. arcade flyer
- Developer: Data East
- Publisher: Data East
- Producer: Naomi Susa
- Designer: Yoshiaki Honda
- Programmers: Sōichi Akiyama; Haruyuki Kobayashi; Nod Suzuki
- Composers: Hiroaki Yoshida; Akira Takemoto
- Platform: Arcade
- Release: 1991
- Genre: Run and gun
- Modes: Single-player, multiplayer

Desert Assault, known in Japan as Thunder Zone (サンダーゾーン), is a 1991 run and gun arcade game developed and published by Data East. Up to four players control four soldiers holding machine guns and other projectile weapons, while fighting their way through the terrorist arsenal to take control of the Persian War.

== Reception ==
In Japan, Game Machine listed Desert Assault on their June 15, 1991 issue as being the fourth most-successful table arcade unit of the month.
