= Emilio Miraglia =

Italian film director

- Born: Emilio Paolo Miraglia; 1 January 1924; Casarano, Italy
- Died: 26 August 1982 (aged 58); Rome, Italy
- Occupation: Film director

Emilio Paolo Miraglia (1 January 1924 – 26 August 1982) was an Italian film director. He began working in film as a director's assistant and technician and worked on many B movies.

Miraglia is known for his two early 1970s giallo films, The Night Evelyn Came Out of the Grave and The Red Queen Kills Seven Times, which was his final film. He died in Rome in 1982, at age 58.

== Filmography ==
- Assassination (1967)
- Frame Up (1968)
- The Vatican Affair (1968)
- The Night Evelyn Came Out of the Grave (1971)
- Joe Dakota (1972)
- The Red Queen Kills Seven Times (1972)
