= Giallo =

Film genre

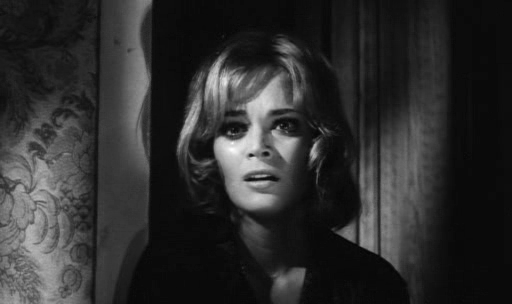
Letícia Román in The Girl Who Knew Too Much (1963), considered by most critics to be the first giallo film

In Italian cinema, giallo (Italian: [ˈdʒallo]; pl.: gialli; from giallo, lit. 'yellow') is a genre that often contains slasher, thriller, psychological horror, psychological thriller, sexploitation, and, less frequently, supernatural horror elements.

This particular style of Italian-produced murder mystery horror-thriller film usually blends the atmosphere and suspense of thriller fiction with elements of horror fiction (such as slasher violence) and eroticism (similar to the French fantastique genre), and it often involves stylized depictions of a mysterious killer whose identity is not revealed until the final act of the film. The genre developed in the mid-to-late 1960s, peaked in popularity during the 1970s, and subsequently declined in commercial mainstream filmmaking over the next few decades, though examples continue to be produced. It was a predecessor to, and had significant influence on, the later slasher film genre.

== Literary origins ==
In the Italian language, giallo is a genre of novel including any literary genre involving crime and mystery, with all its sub-genres such as crime fiction, detective story, murder mystery, or thriller-horror.

Mondadori's 1933 translation of Edgar Wallace's 1920 novel Jack O' Judgement (rendered in Italian as Il Fante di Fiori, The Jack of Clubs), with the characteristic yellow background and the figure of a masked killer

The term giallo ("yellow") derives from a series of crime-mystery pulp novels entitled Il Giallo Mondadori (Mondadori Yellow), published by Mondadori from 1929 and taking its name from the trademark yellow cover background. The series consisted almost exclusively of Italian translations of mystery novels by British and American writers. These included Agatha Christie, Ellery Queen, Edgar Wallace, Ed McBain, Rex Stout, Edgar Allan Poe, and Raymond Chandler.

Published as cheap paperbacks, the success of the giallo novels soon began attracting the attention of other Italian publishing houses. They published their own versions and mimicked the yellow covers. The popularity of these series eventually established the word giallo as a synonym in Italian for a mystery novel. In colloquial and media usage in Italy, it also applied to a mysterious or unsolved affair.

The Italian film genre began as literal adaptations of the original giallo mystery novels (see the 1933 film simply known as Giallo). Directors soon began taking advantage of modern cinematic techniques to create a unique genre that retained the mystery and crime fiction elements of giallo novels but veered more closely into the psychological thriller or psychological horror genres. Many of the typical characteristics of these films were incorporated into the later American slasher genre.

== Terminology ==
In the film context, for Italian audiences giallo refers to any kind of murder mystery or horror thriller, regardless of its national origin.

Meanwhile, English-speaking audiences have used the term giallo to refer specifically to a genre of Italian-produced thriller-horror films known to Italian audiences as giallo all'italiana.

In the English-speaking world, Italian giallo films are also sometimes referred to as spaghetti thrillers or spaghetti slashers, in a similar manner to how Italian Western films and poliziotteschi films from the same period have been referred to as spaghetti Westerns and spaghetti crime films, respectively.

== Characteristics ==
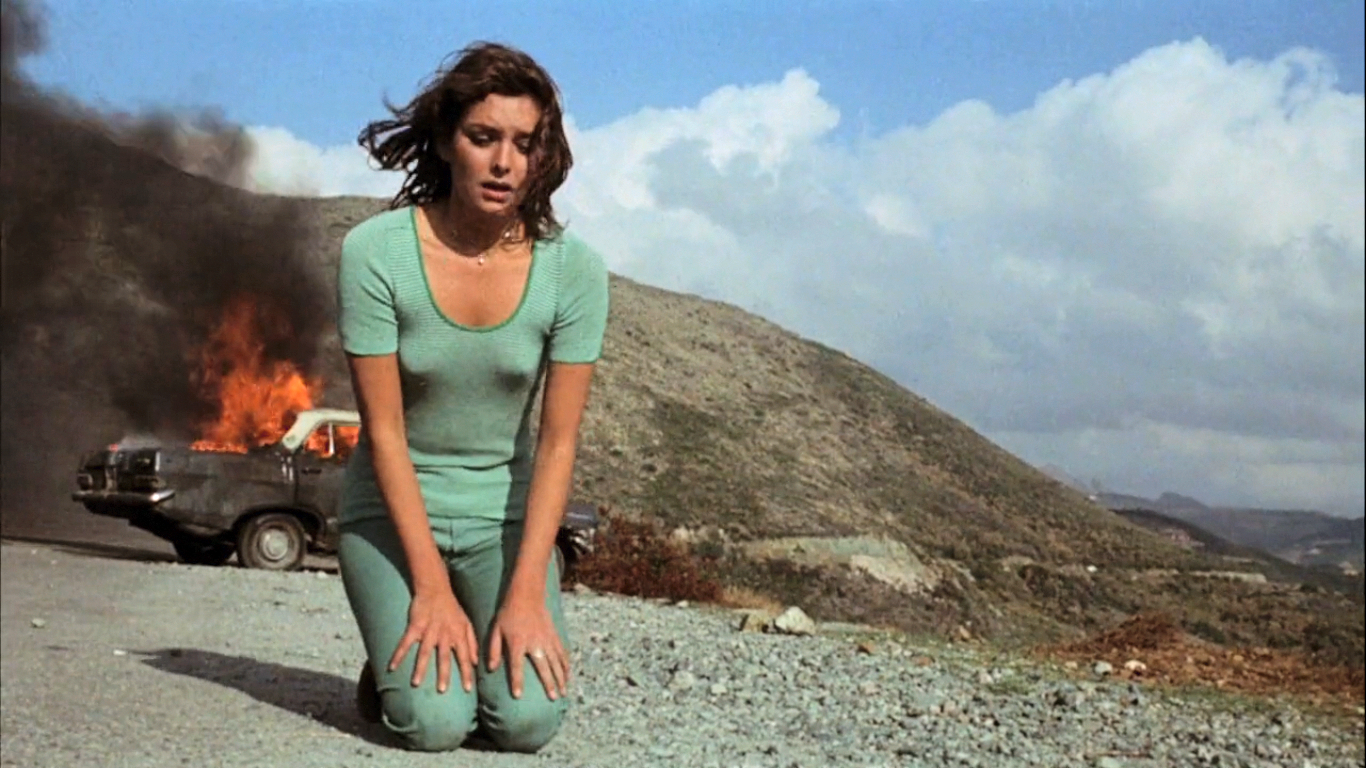
Eye in the Labyrinth (1972) features a female outsider whose own private investigation leads her into a strange environment.

Most critics agree that the giallo represents a distinct category with characteristic thematic and stylistic features, though various critics have proposed slightly different characteristics (which consequently creates some confusion over which films can be considered gialli).

Although they often involve crime and detective work, gialli should not be confused with the other popular Italian crime genre of the 1970s, the poliziotteschi, which includes more action-oriented films about violent law enforcement officers (largely influenced by gritty American films such as Bullitt, Dirty Harry, Death Wish, The Godfather, Serpico, and The French Connection). Directors and actors often moved between both genres and there is some overlap between them. While most poliziotteschi dealt with organized crime and police responses to it, some early examples of the genre focused instead on murder investigations, and especially on cases where a woman had been murdered in sexual circumstances. These films were more psychological than action-driven, and borrowed various themes and motifs from gialli. Examples include Investigation of a Citizen Above Suspicion (1970) and No, the Case Is Happily Resolved (1973). Some films could even be considered under the banner of either genre, such as Fernando Di Leo's Naked Violence (1969) and Massimo Dallamano's 1974 film La polizia chiede aiuto (What Have They Done to Your Daughters?).

=== Structure ===
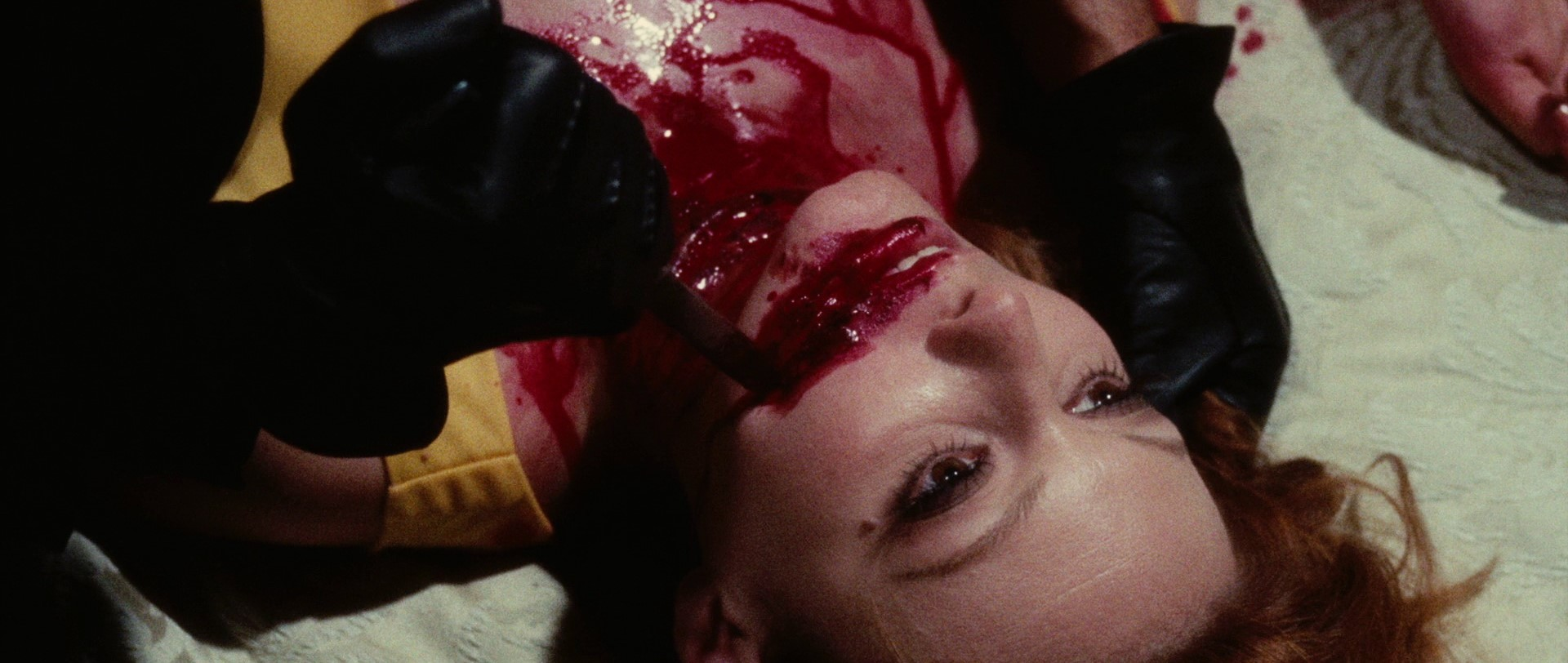
A scene from Death Walks on High Heels (1971) showing excessive violence associated with many gialli

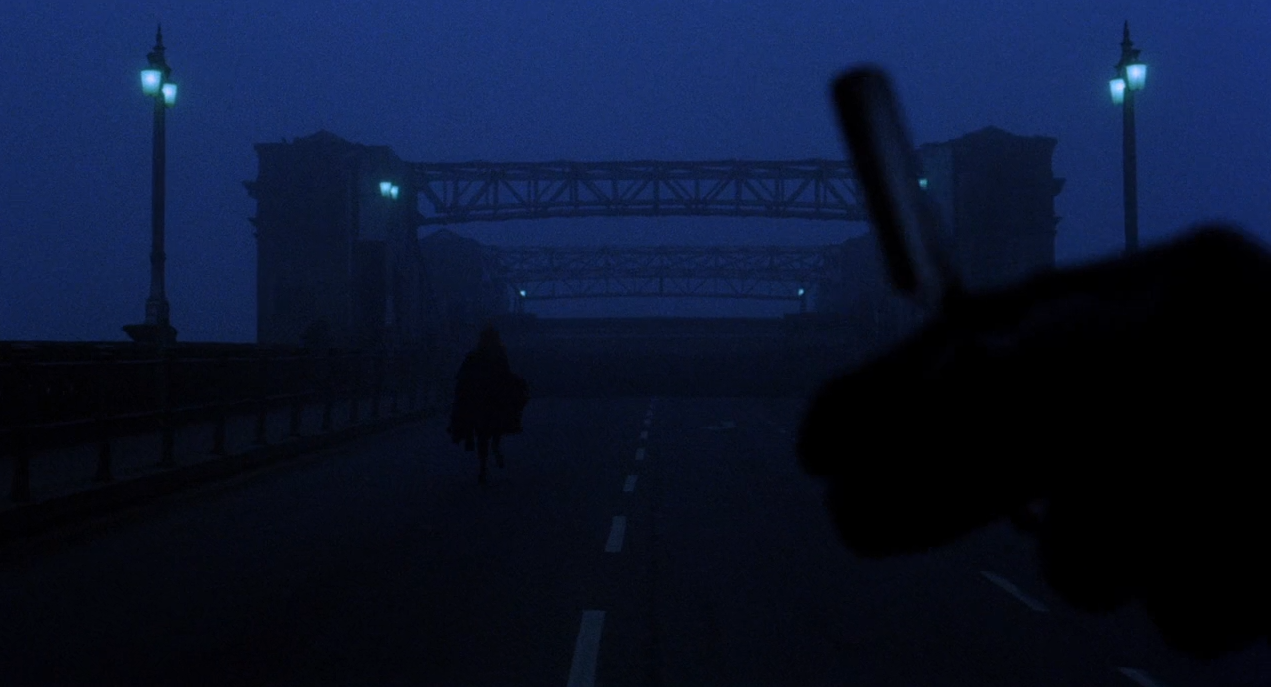
Shadowy atmosphere in a chase sequence from The Iguana with the Tongue of Fire (1971), shot from the killer's POV, featuring their black-gloved hand brandishing a razor on the right

Giallo films are generally characterized as gruesome murder-mystery thrillers that combine the suspense elements of detective fiction with scenes of shocking horror, featuring excessive bloodletting, stylish camerawork, and often jarring musical arrangements. The archetypal giallo plot involves a mysterious, black-gloved psychopathic killer who stalks and butchers a series of beautiful women. While most gialli involve a human killer, some also feature a supernatural element.

The typical giallo protagonist is an outsider of some type, often a traveller, tourist, outcast, or even an alienated or disgraced private investigator, and frequently a young woman, often a young woman who is lonely or alone in a strange or foreign situation or environment (gialli rarely or less frequently feature law enforcement officers as chief protagonists, which would be more characteristic of the poliziotteschi genre). The protagonists are generally or often unconnected to the murders before they begin and are drawn to help find the killer through their role as a witness to one of the murders. Author Michael Mackenzie has written that gialli can be divided into the male-focused m. gialli, which usually sees a male outsider witness a murder and become the target of the killer when he attempts to solve the crime; and f. gialli, which features a female protagonist who is embroiled in a more sexual and psychological story, typically focusing on her sexuality, psyche, and fragile mental state.

The mystery is the identity of the killer, who is often revealed in the climax to be another key character, who conceals his or her identity with a disguise (usually some combination of hat, mask, sunglasses, gloves, and trench coat). Thus, the literary whodunit element of the giallo novels is retained, while being filtered through horror genre elements and Italy's long-standing tradition of opera and staged grand guignol drama. The structure of giallo films is also sometimes reminiscent of the so-called "weird menace" pulp magazine horror mystery genre alongside Edgar Allan Poe and Agatha Christie.

While most gialli have elements of this basic narrative structure, not all do. Some films (for example Mario Bava's 1970 Hatchet for the Honeymoon, which features the killer as the protagonist) may radically alter the traditional structure or abandon it altogether and still be considered gialli due to stylistic or thematic tropes, rather than narrative ones. A consistent element of the genre is an unusual lack of focus on coherent or logical narrative storytelling. While most have a nominal mystery structure, they may feature bizarre or seemingly nonsensical plot elements and a general disregard for realism in acting, dialogue, and character motivation. As Jon Abrams wrote, "Individually, each [giallo] is like an improv exercise in murder, with each filmmaker having access to a handful of shared props and themes. Black gloves, sexual ambiguity, and psychoanalytic trauma may be at the heart of each film, but the genre itself is without consistent narrative form."

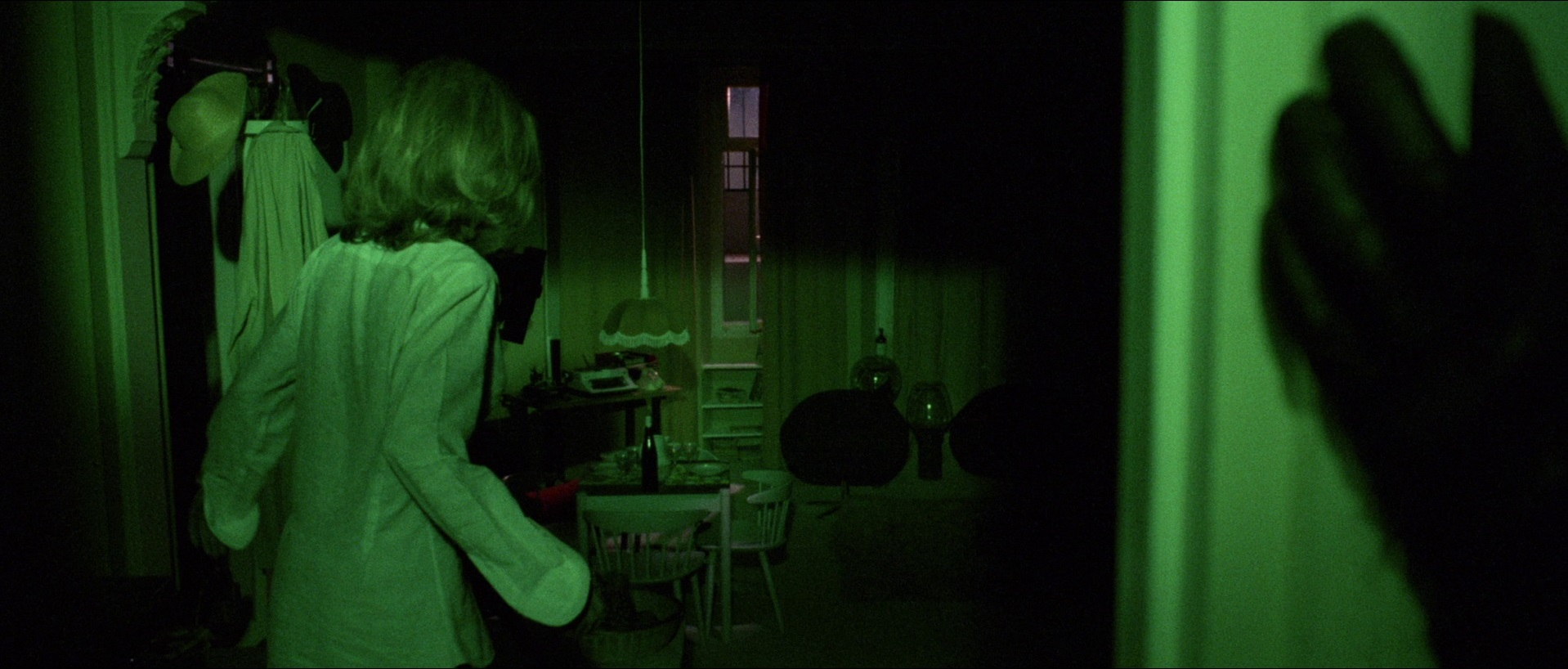
Anita Strindberg in The Case of the Scorpion's Tail (1971), showing giallo trademarks: a black-gloved killer's POV, vivid colour and a vulnerable young woman

=== Content ===
While a shadowy killer and mystery narrative are common to most gialli, the most consistent and notable shared trope in the giallo tradition is the focus on grisly death sequences. The murders are invariably violent and gory, featuring a variety of explicit and imaginative attacks. These scenes frequently evoke some degree of voyeurism, sometimes going so far as to present the murder from the first-person perspective of the killer, with the black-gloved hand holding a knife viewed from the killer's point of view. The murders often occur when the victim is most vulnerable (showering, taking a bath, or scantily clad); as such, giallo films often include liberal amounts of nudity and sex, almost all of it featuring beautiful young women. Actresses associated with the genre include Edwige Fenech, Barbara Bach, Daria Nicolodi, Mimsy Farmer, Barbara Bouchet, Suzy Kendall, Ida Galli, and Anita Strindberg. Due to the titillating emphasis on explicit sex and violence, gialli are sometimes categorized as exploitation cinema. The association of female sexuality and brutal violence has led the genre to be accused of misogyny.

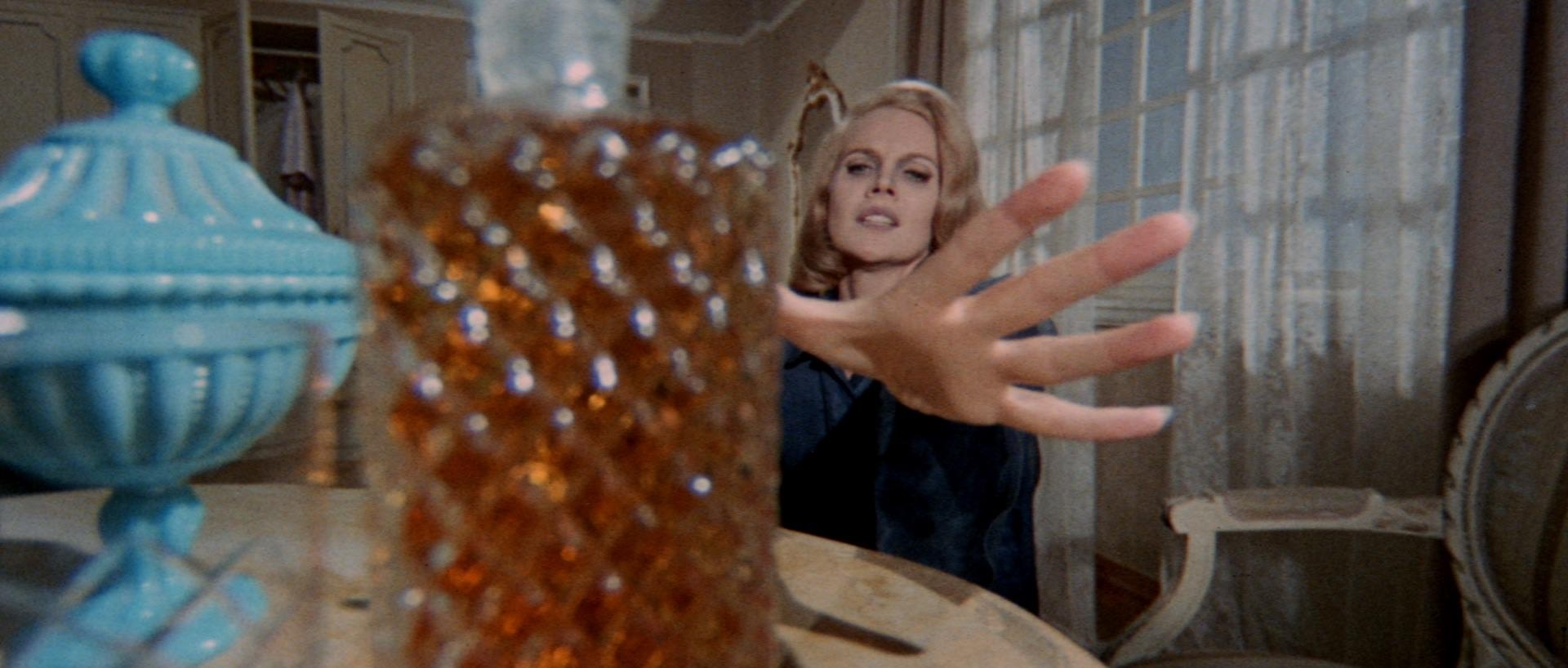
Orgasmo (1969) features a female protagonist (Carroll Baker) who becomes embroiled in a psychological, sexual conflict.

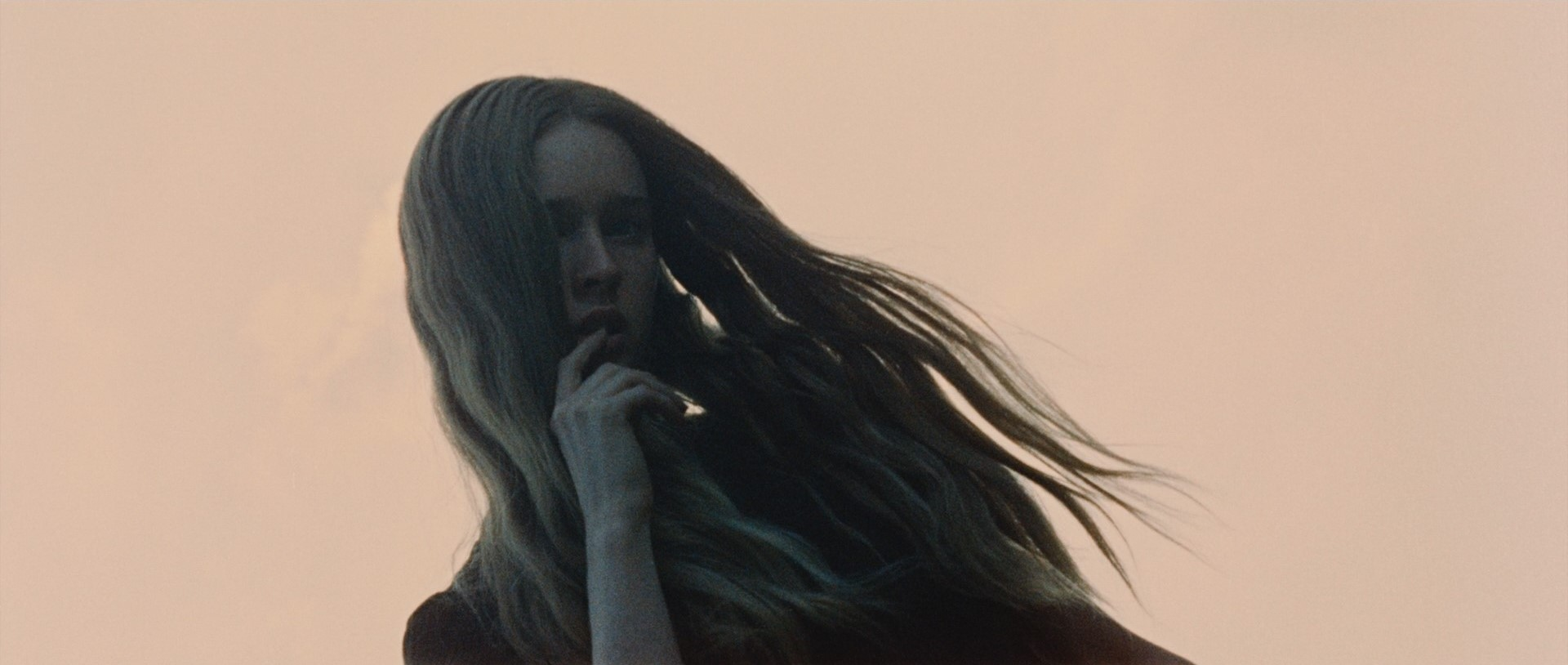
What Have You Done to Solange? (1972) incorporates themes of female sexuality and past psychological trauma, depicted prominently through flashbacks.

=== Themes ===
Gialli are noted for psychological themes of madness, alienation, sexuality, and paranoia. The protagonist is usually a witness to a gruesome crime but frequently finds their testimony subject to skepticism from authority figures, leading to a questioning of their own perception and authority. This ambiguity of memory and perception can escalate to delusion, hallucination, or delirious paranoia. Since gialli protagonists are typically female, this can lead to what writer Gary Needham calls, "...the giallo's inherent pathologising of femininity and fascination with "sick" women". The killer is likely to be mentally-ill as well; giallo killers are almost always motivated by insanity caused by some past psychological trauma, often of a sexual nature (and sometimes depicted in flashbacks). The emphasis on madness and subjective perception has roots in the giallo novels (for example, Sergio Martino's Your Vice Is a Locked Room and Only I Have the Key was based on Edgar Allan Poe's short story "The Black Cat", which deals with a psychologically unstable narrator) but also finds expression in the tools of cinema. Writer Mikel J. Koven posits that gialli reflect an ambivalence over the social upheaval modernity brought to Italian culture in the 1960s.

The changes within Italian culture... can be seen throughout the giallo film as something to be discussed and debated – issues pertaining to identity, sexuality, increasing levels of violence, women's control over their own lives and bodies, history, the state – all abstract ideas, which are all portrayed situationally as human stories in the giallo film.

== Production ==
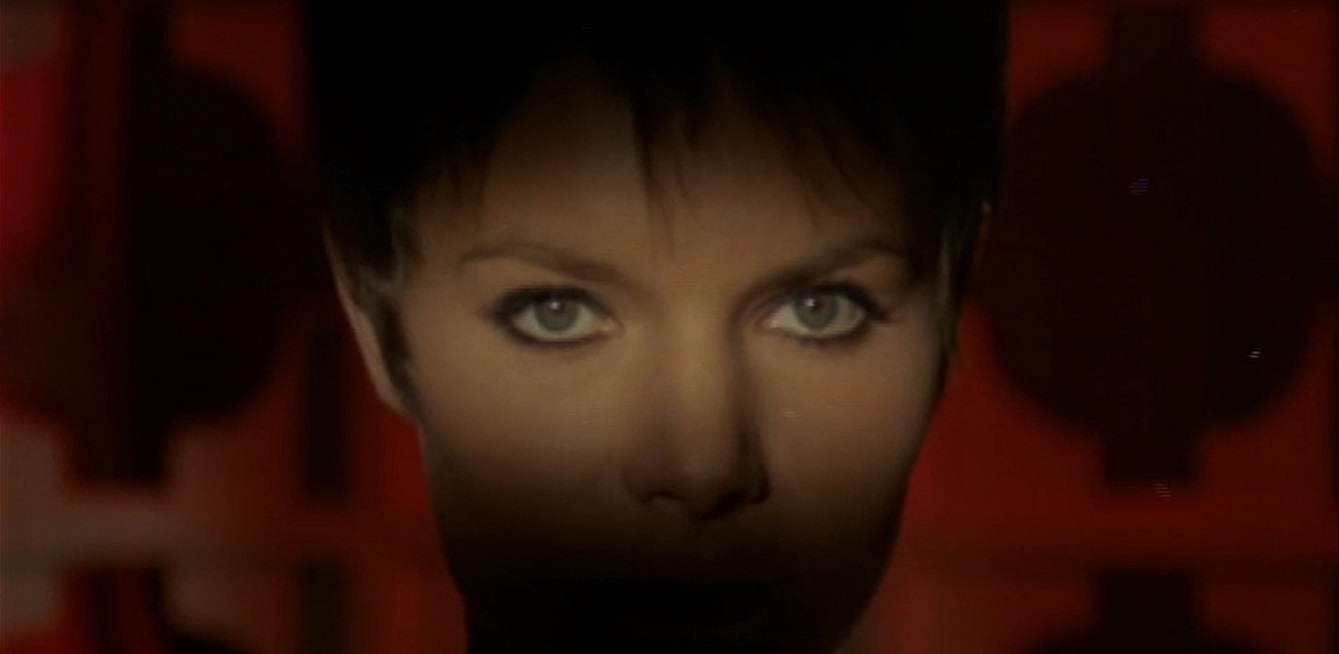
Colette Descombes in a scene from Orgasmo (1969), an example of stylish visual and close-up emphasis on eyes

Gialli have been noted for their strong cinematic technique, with critics praising their editing, production design, music, and visual style even in the marked absence of other facets usually associated with critical admiration (as gialli frequently lack characterization, believable dialogue, realistic performances and logical coherence in the narrative). Alexia Kannas wrote of 1968's La morte ha fatto l'uovo (Death Laid an Egg) that "While the film has garnered a reputation for its supreme narrative difficulty (just as many art films have), its aesthetic brilliance is irrefutable", while Leon Hunt wrote that frequent gialli director Dario Argento's work "vacillate[s] between strategies of art cinema and exploitation".

=== Visual style ===
Gialli are frequently associated with strong technical cinematography and stylish visuals. Critic Maitland McDonagh describes the visuals of Profondo rosso (Deep Red) as "vivid colors and bizarre camera angles, dizzying pans and flamboyant tracking shots, disorienting framing and composition, fetishistic close-ups of quivering eyes and weird objects (knives, dolls, marbles, braided scraps of wool)...". Critic Roberto Curti describes the visual style of gialli in relation to the counterculture era as, "a pop delirium filled with psychedelic paraphernalia". In addition to the iconic images of shadowy black-gloved killers and gruesome violence, gialli also frequently employ strongly stylized and even occasionally surreal uses of color. Directors Dario Argento and Mario Bava are particularly known for their impressionistic imagery and use of lurid colors, though other giallo directors (notably Lucio Fulci) employed more sedate, realistic styles as well. Due to their typical 1970s milieu, some commentators have also noted their potential for visual camp, especially in terms of fashion and decor.

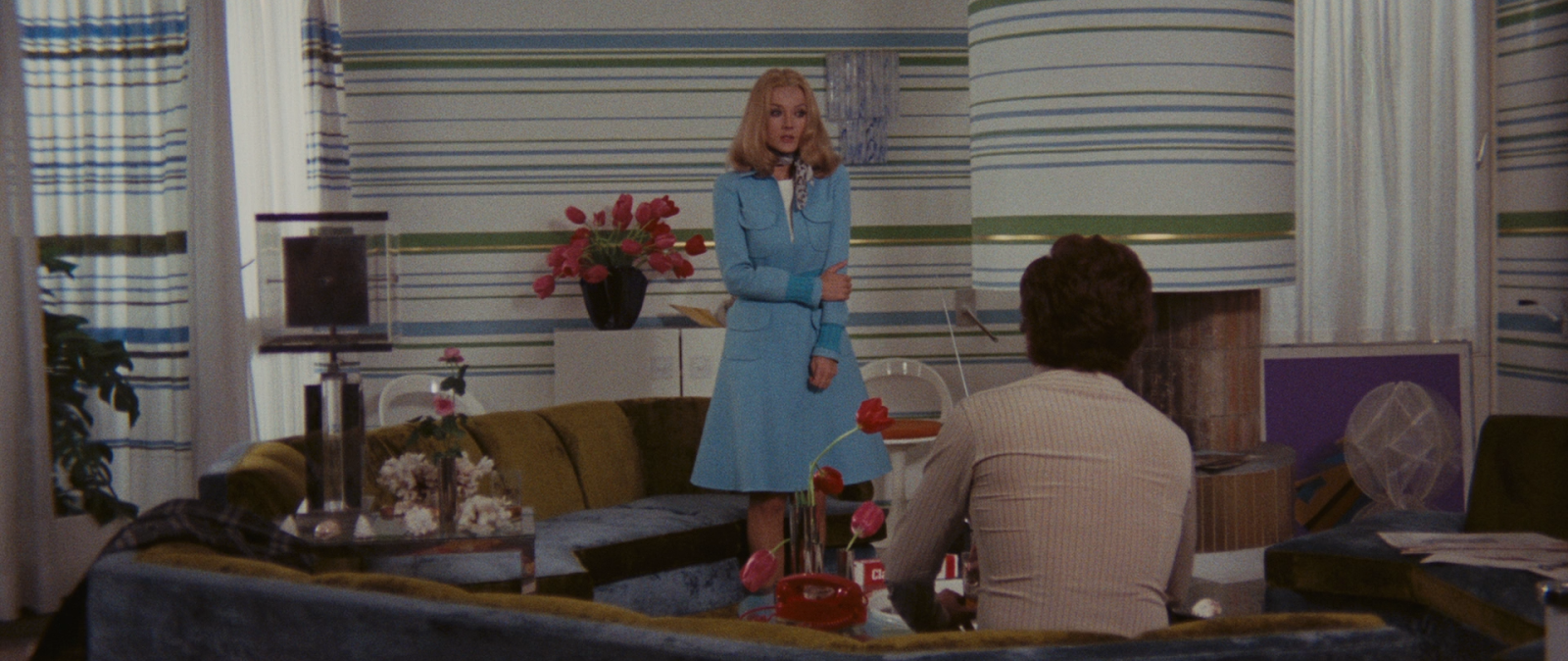
The Red Queen Kills Seven Times (1972) is noted for its interiors and colorful early 1970s fashion.

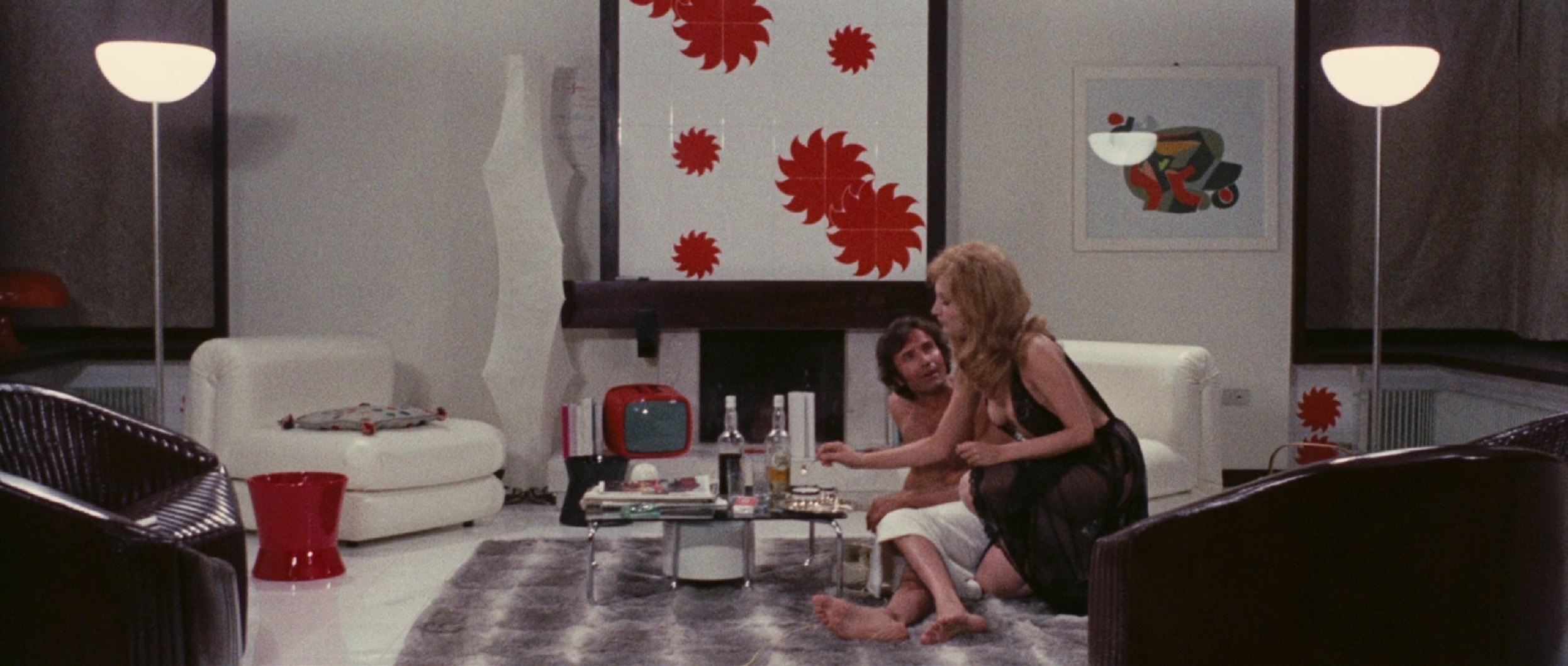
Gladys Cunningham's (Marina Malfatti) apartment decor in The Night Evelyn Came Out of the Grave (1971)

=== Music ===
Music has been cited as a key to the genre's unique character; critic Maitland McDonagh describes Profondo rosso (Deep Red) as an "overwhelming visceral experience ... equal parts visual ... and aural". Writer Anne Billson explains, "The Giallo Sound is typically an intoxicating mix of groovy lounge music, nerve-jangling discord, and the sort of soothing lyricism that belies the fact that it's actually accompanying, say, a slow motion decapitation", (she cites as an example Ennio Morricone's score for 1971's Four Flies on Grey Velvet). Many notable giallo soundtracks feature instrumentalist, Alessandro Alessandroni, his vocal group, I Cantori Moderni and wordless female vocals, usually performed by Edda Dell'Orso, or Nora Orlandi, including Bruno Nicolai's score for All the Colors of the Dark. Composers of note include Morricone, Nicolai, and the Italian band Goblin. Other important composers known for their work on giallo films include Piero Umiliani (composer for Five Dolls for an August Moon), Riz Ortolani (The Pyjama Girl Case), Nora Orlandi (The Strange Vice of Mrs. Wardh), Stelvio Cipriani (The Iguana with the Tongue of Fire), and Fabio Frizzi (Sette note in nero a.k.a.The Psychic).

=== Titles ===
Gialli often feature lurid or Baroque titles, frequently employing animal references or the use of numbers. Examples of the former trend include Sette scialli di seta gialla (Crimes of the Black Cat), Non si sevizia un paperino (Don't Torture a Duckling), La morte negli occhi del gatto (Seven Deaths in the Cat's Eye), and La tarantola dal ventre nero (Black Belly of the Tarantula); while instances of the latter include Sette note in nero (Seven Notes in Black) and The Fifth Cord.

== History and development ==
The first giallo novel to be adapted for film was James M. Cain's The Postman Always Rings Twice, adapted in 1943 by Luchino Visconti as Ossessione. Though the film was technically the first of Mondadori's giallo series to be adapted, its neo-realist style was markedly different from the stylized, violent character which subsequent adaptations would acquire. Condemned by the fascist government, Ossessione was eventually hailed as a landmark of neo-realist cinema, but it did not provoke any further giallo adaptations for almost 20 years.

In addition to the literary giallo tradition, early gialli were also influenced by the German "krimi" films of the early 1960s. Produced by Danish/German studio Rialto Film, these black-and-white crime movies based on Edgar Wallace stories typically featured whodunit mystery plots with a masked killer, anticipating several key components of the giallo movement by several years. Despite their link to giallo author Wallace, they featured little of the excessive stylization and gore which would define Italian gialli.

The Swedish director Arne Mattsson has also been pointed to as a possible influence, in particular his 1958 film Mannequin in Red. Though the film shares stylistic and narrative similarities with later giallo films (particularly its use of color and its multiple murder plot), there is no direct evidence that subsequent Italian directors had seen it.

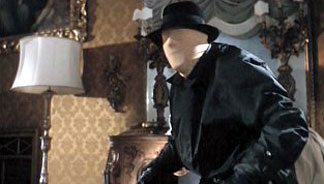
Goffredo Unger (doubling for the murderer revealed at the end of the film) as The Masked Killer from Blood and Black Lace (1964) would serve as the visual template for the stock giallo killer. Tim Lucas has noted that the film's depiction of a "split identity" villain – an evolution from the split personality antagonist present in such films as Psycho – predates its later use in the Scream franchise, while Michael Mackenzie has noted that the disguising of the character(s)' gender would become a recurring element in other gialli.

The first "true" giallo film is usually considered to be Mario Bava's The Girl Who Knew Too Much (1963). Its title alludes to Alfred Hitchcock's classic The Man Who Knew Too Much (1934, remade by Hitchcock in 1956), highlighting the early link between gialli and Anglo-American crime stories. Though shot in black and white and lacking the lurid violence and sexuality which would define later gialli, the film has been credited with establishing the essential structure of the genre: in it, a young American tourist in Rome witnesses a murder, finds her testimony dismissed by the authorities, and must attempt to uncover the killer's identity herself. Bava drew on the krimi tradition as well as the Hitchcockian style referenced in the title, and the film's structure served as a basic template for many of the gialli that would follow.

Bava followed The Girl Who Knew Too Much the next year with the stylish and influential Blood and Black Lace (1964). It introduced a number of elements that became emblematic of the genre: a masked stalker with a shiny weapon in his black-gloved hand who brutally murders a series of glamorous fashion models. Though the movie was not a financial success at the time, the tropes it introduced (particularly its black-gloved killer, provocative sexuality, and bold use of color) would become iconic of the genre.

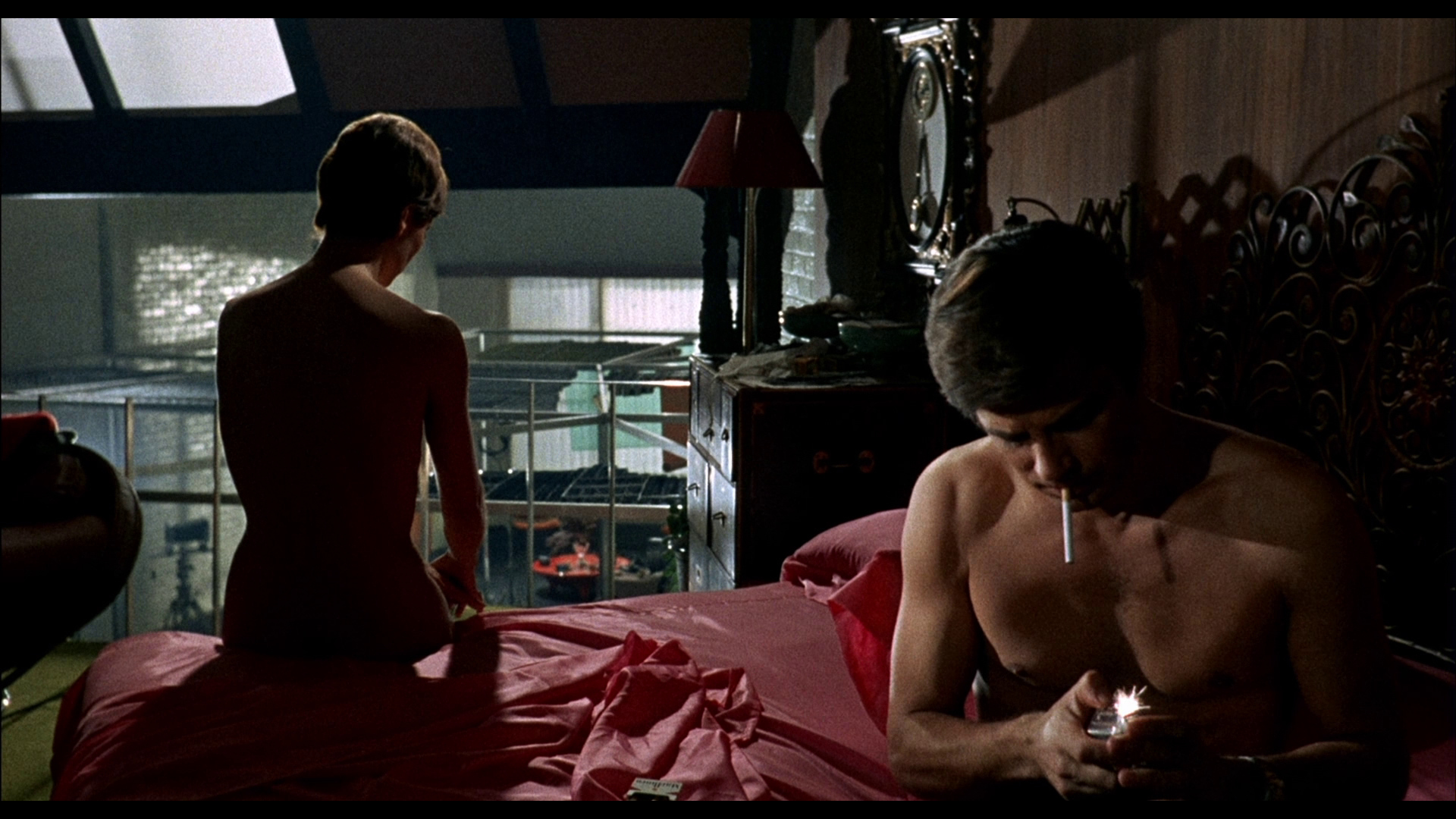
Jean Sorel and Elsa Martinelli in One on Top of the Other (1969); an erotic thriller of the late 1960s, released before the giallo explosion

Several similarly themed crime/thriller movies followed in the next few years, including early efforts from directors Antonio Margheriti (Nude... si muore [Naked You Die] in 1968), Romolo Girolami (Il dolce corpo di Deborah [The Sweet Body of Deborah] in 1968), Umberto Lenzi (Orgasmo in 1969, Paranoia [A Quiet Place to Kill] and Così dolce... così perversa [So Sweet... So Perverse] in 1969), Riccardo Freda (A doppia faccia [Double Face] in 1969), and Lucio Fulci (Una sull'altra [One on Top of the Other] in 1969), all of whom would go on to become major creative forces in the burgeoning genre. But it was Dario Argento's first feature, in 1970, that turned the giallo into a major cultural phenomenon. That film, The Bird with the Crystal Plumage, was greatly influenced by Blood and Black Lace, and introduced a new level of stylish violence and suspense that helped redefine the genre. The film was a box office smash and was widely imitated. Its success provoked a frenzy of Italian films with stylish, violent, and sexually provocative murder plots (Argento alone made three more in the next five years) essentially cementing the genre in the public consciousness. In 1996, director Michele Soavi wrote, "There's no doubt that it was Mario Bava who started the 'spaghetti thrillers' [but] Argento gave them a great boost, a turning point, a new style...'new clothes'. Mario had grown old and Dario made it his own genre... this had repercussions on genre cinema, which, thanks to Dario, was given a new lease on life." The success of The Bird with the Crystal Plumage provoked a decade which saw multiple gialli produced every year. In English-language film circles, the term giallo gradually became synonymous with a heavy, theatrical and stylized visual element.

In 2021, a festival named the Giallo Film Festival was founded by the film director Yan Berthemy. Dedicated to genre cinema, this annual event showcases international short films. It is funded by the Sorbonne Nouvelle University and the Crous of Paris, ensuring both accessibility and visibility.

The 2024 edition of the festival was marked by the jury being co-chaired by Nicolas Martin and Pablo Dury. Two films by Bertrand Mandico and Julia Kowalski were also screened to close the festival.

== Popularity and legacy ==
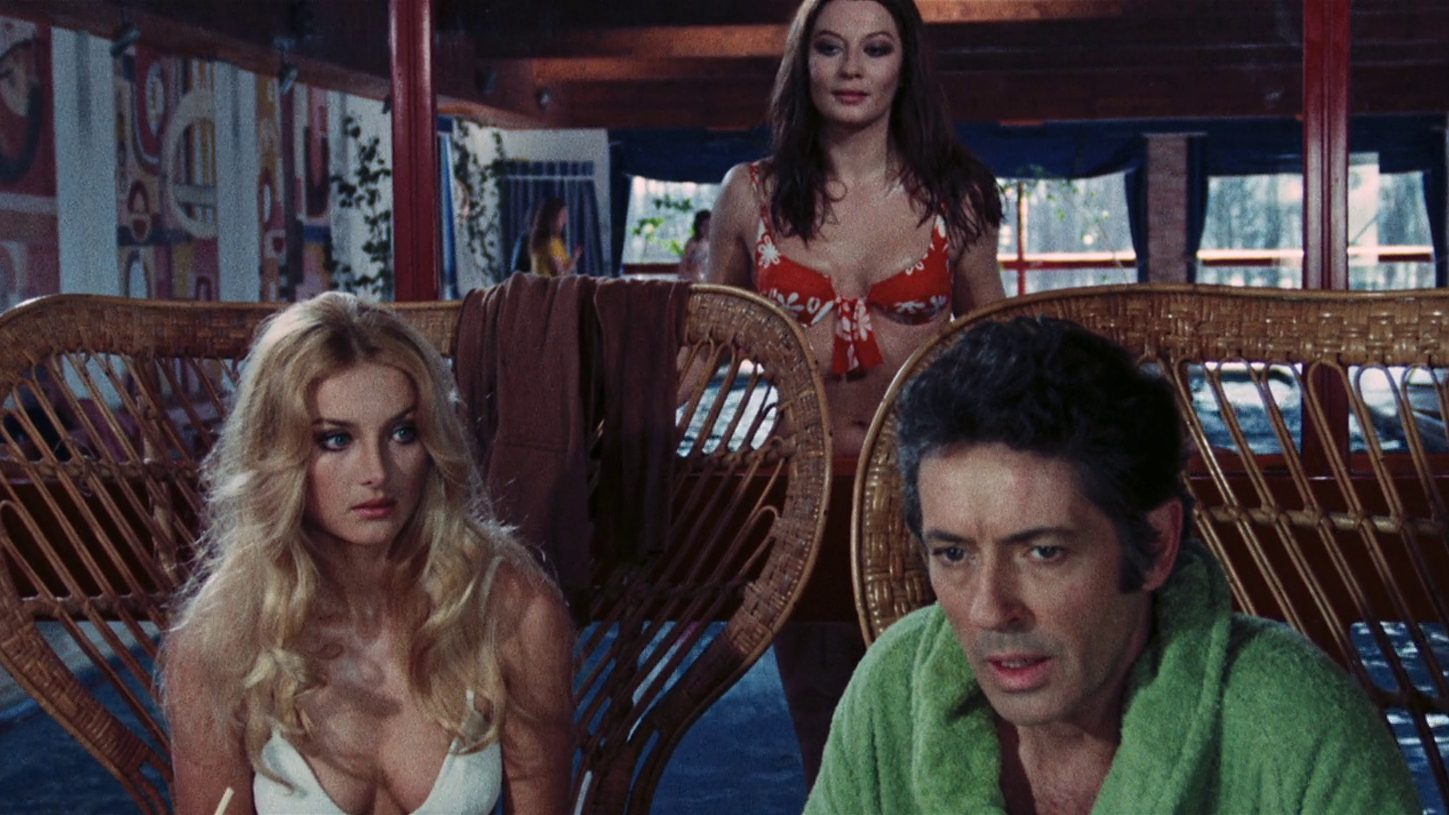
Barbara Bouchet, Rosalba Neri and Farley Granger in Amuck! (1972), released during the peak popularity of gialli

The giallo genre had its heyday from 1968 through 1978. The most prolific period, however, was the five-year timespan between 1971 and 1975, during which time over 100 different gialli were produced (see List of giallo films). Directors like Bava, Argento, Fulci, Lenzi, Freda and Margheriti continued to produce gialli throughout the 70s and beyond, and were soon joined by other notable directors including Sergio Martino, Paolo Cavara, Armando Crispino, Ruggero Deodato, and Bava's son Lamberto Bava. The genre also spread to Spain by the early 70s, resulting in films like La residencia (The House That Screamed) (1969) and Los Ojos Azules de la Muñeca Rota (Blue Eyes Of The Broken Doll) (1973), which had unmistakable giallo characteristics, but featured Spanish casts and production talent. Though they preceded the first giallo by a few years, German krimi films continued to be made contemporaneously with early gialli, and were also influenced by their success. As the popularity of krimis declined in Germany, Rialto Film began increasingly pairing with Italian production companies and filmmakers (such as composer Ennio Morricone and director, cinematographer Joe D'Amato, who worked on later krimi films following their successes in Italy). The overlap between the two movements is extensive enough that one of Rialto's final krimi films, Cosa avete fatto a Solange? (What Have You Done to Solange?), features an Italian director and crew and has been called a giallo in its own right.

Gialli continued to be produced throughout the 1970s and 1980s, but gradually their popularity diminished and film budgets and production values began shrinking. Director Pupi Avati satirized the genre in 1977 with a slapstick giallo titled Tutti defunti... tranne i morti.

Though the giallo cycle waned in the 1990s and saw few entries in the 2000s, they continue to be produced, notably by Argento (who in 2009 released a film actually titled Giallo, somewhat in homage to his long career in the genre) and co-directors Hélène Cattet and Bruno Forzani, whose Amer (which uses music from older gialli, including tracks by Morricone and Nicolai) received a positive critical reception upon its release in 2009. To a large degree, the genre's influence lives on in the slasher films which became enormously popular during the 1980s and drew heavily on tropes developed by earlier gialli.

=== Influence ===
The giallo cycle has had a lasting effect on horror films and murder mysteries made outside Italy since the late 1960s as this cinematic style and unflinching content is also at the root of the gory slasher and splatter films that became widely popular in the early 1980s. In particular, two violent shockers from Mario Bava, Hatchet for the Honeymoon (1970) and Twitch of the Death Nerve (1971) were especially influential.

Early examples of the giallo effect can be seen in the British film Berserk! (1967) and such American mystery-thrillers as No Way to Treat a Lady (1968), the Oscar-winning Klute (1971), Pretty Maids All in a Row (1971, based on an Italian novel), Alfred Hitchcock's Frenzy (1972), Vincent Price's Madhouse (1974), Eyes of Laura Mars (1978), and Brian De Palma's Dressed to Kill (1980). Berberian Sound Studio (2012) offers an affectionate tribute to the genre.

Director Eli Roth has called the giallo "one of my favorite, favorite subgenres of film", and specifically cited Sergio Martino's Torso (I corpi presentano tracce di violenza carnale) (along with the Spanish horror film Who Can Kill a Child?) as influential on his 2005 film Hostel, writing, "...these seventies Italian giallos start off with a group of students that are in Rome, lots of scenes in piazzas with telephoto lenses, and you get the feeling they're being watched. There's this real ominous creepy feeling. The girls are always going on some trip somewhere and they're all very smart. They all make decisions the audience would make."

== Filmography ==
- List of giallo films

== Notable personalities ==
=== Directors ===
- Silvio Amadio
- Dario Argento
- Pupi Avati
- Francesco Barilli
- Lamberto Bava
- Mario Bava
- Luigi Bazzoni
- Sergio Bergonzelli
- Giuliano Carnimeo
- Paolo Cavara
- Armando Crispino
- Massimo Dallamano
- Alberto De Martino
- Ruggero Deodato
- Brian De Palma
- Luciano Ercoli
- Riccardo Freda
- Lucio Fulci
- Romolo Guerrieri
- Aldo Lado
- Umberto Lenzi
- Michele Lupo
- Antonio Margheriti
- Sergio Martino
- Emilio Miraglia
- Brunello Rondi
- Salvatore Samperi
- Duccio Tessari

=== Writers ===
- Sandro Continenza
- Sergio Corbucci
- Ennio De Concini
- Sergio Donati
- Ernesto Gastaldi
- Mino Guerrini

=== Actors and actresses ===
- Simón Andreu
- Claudine Auger
- Ewa Aulin
- Barbara Bach
- Carroll Baker
- Eva Bartók
- Agostina Belli
- Femi Benussi
- Helmut Berger
- Erika Blanc
- Florinda Bolkan
- Barbara Bouchet
- Pier Paolo Capponi
- Adolfo Celi
- Orchidea De Santis
- Anita Ekberg
- Eduardo Fajardo
- Rossella Falk
- Mimsy Farmer
- Edwige Fenech
- James Franciscus
- Cristina Galbó
- Ida Galli
- Giancarlo Giannini
- Farley Granger
- Brett Halsey
- David Hemmings
- George Hilton
- Robert Hoffmann
- Annabella Incontrera
- Suzy Kendall
- Sylva Koscina
- Dagmar Lassander
- Philippe Leroy
- Helga Liné
- Beba Lončar
- Ray Lovelock
- Marina Malfatti
- Leonard Mann
- Marisa Mell
- Alberto de Mendoza
- Luc Merenda
- Macha Méril
- Tomas Milian
- Cameron Mitchell
- Silvia Monti
- Tony Musante
- Paul Naschy
- Nieves Navarro
- Rosalba Neri
- Franco Nero
- Daria Nicolodi
- Luciana Paluzzi
- Irene Papas
- Luigi Pistilli
- Ivan Rassimov
- Fernando Rey
- John Richardson
- George Rigaud
- Letícia Román
- Howard Ross
- John Saxon
- Erna Schürer
- Jean Sorel
- Anthony Steffen
- John Steiner
- Anita Strindberg
- Fabio Testi
- Gabriele Tinti
- Marilu Tolo
- Silvano Tranquilli
- Jean-Louis Trintignant

=== Composers ===
- Stelvio Cipriani
- Pino Donaggio
- Gianni Ferrio
- Giorgio Gaslini
- Goblin
- Ennio Morricone
- Bruno Nicolai
- Nora Orlandi
- Riz Ortolani
- Piero Piccioni
- Berto Pisano
- Carlo Savina
- Claudio Simonetti
- Armando Trovajoli
- Piero Umiliani

== Films influenced by giallo ==
- Blowup (Michelangelo Antonioni; 1966)
- Night After Night After Night (Lewis J. Force; 1969)
- She Killed in Ecstasy (Jesús Franco; 1970)
- Klute (Alan J. Pakula; 1971)
- Frenzy (Alfred Hitchcock; 1972)
- The Gore Gore Girls (Herschell Gordon Lewis; 1972)
- Sisters (Brian De Palma; 1973)
- Knife for the Ladies (Larry G. Spangler; 1974)
- Night of the Skull (Jesús Franco; 1974)
- Black Christmas (Bob Clark; 1974)
- Schizo (Pete Walker; 1976)
- Alice, Sweet Alice (Alfred Sole; 1976)
- The Toolbox Murders (Dennis Donnelly; 1978)
- Eyes of Laura Mars (Irvin Kershner; 1978)
- Halloween (John Carpenter; 1978)
- Cruising (William Friedkin; 1980)
- Friday the 13th (Sean S. Cunningham; 1980)
- Dressed to Kill (Brian De Palma; 1980)
- Bloody Moon (Jesús Franco; 1981)
- The Burning (Tony Maylam; 1981)
- Happy Birthday to Me (J. Lee Thompson; 1981)
- Blow Out (Brian De Palma; 1981)
- Night School (Ken Hughes; 1981)
- Next of Kin (Tony Williams; 1982)
- Pieces (Juan Piquer Simón; 1982)
- Unhinged (Don Gronquist; 1982)
- American Nightmare (Don McBrearty; 1983)
- The Fourth Man (1983 film) (Paul Verhoeven)
- Don't Open till Christmas (Edmund Purdom; 1984)
- Body Double (Brian De Palma; 1984)
- City in Panic (Robert Bouvier; 1986)
- Knight Moves (Carl Schenkel; 1992)
- Basic Instinct (Paul Verhoeven; 1992)
- The Dark Half (George A. Romero; 1993)
- Color of Night (Richard Rush; 1994)
- Perfect Blue (Satoshi Kon, 1997)
- Kill Bill: Volume 2 (Quentin Tarantino; 2004)
- Hostel (Eli Roth; 2005)
- I Know Who Killed Me (Chris Sivertson; 2007)
- Knife+Heart (Yann Gonzalez; 2018)
- Last Night in Soho (Edgar Wright; 2021)
- Censor (Prano Bailey-Bond; 2021)
- Malignant (James Wan; 2021)
- Emesis Blue (Chad Payne; 2023)
- MaXXXine (Ti West; 2024)
- Her Private Hell (Nicolas Winding Refn; 2026)

== See also ==
- List of giallo films
