= Mario Caiano =

Italian film director and archeologist (1933–2015)

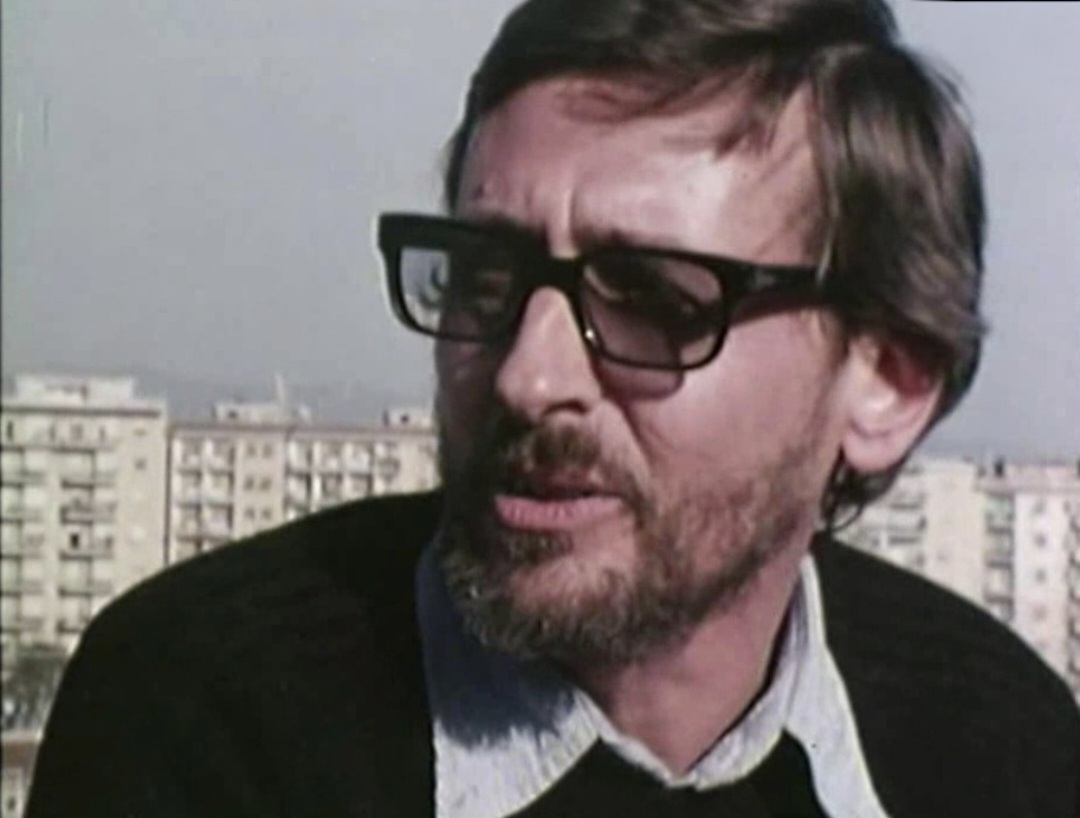
- Caiano in 1977
- Born: February 13, 1933; Rome, Italy
- Died: September 20, 2015 (aged 82)
- Occupations: Director; producer; screenwriter
- Years active: 1954–2002

Mario Caiano (February 13, 1933 – September 20, 2015) was an Italian film director, screenwriter, producer, art director and second unit director.

== Career ==
Born in Rome, he directed nearly 50 films between 1961 and 2001 and wrote some 27 films and TV scripts since 1954.

He is primarily known for his work on Spaghetti Westerns, Pepla, Euro Crime and to a slightly lesser degree on horror films. Caiano directed (as Allen Grünewald) and wrote the script for Nightmare Castle (Amanti d'oltretomba, 1965), which stars Barbara Steele. Eye in the Labyrinth (1972) is a later film in the genre that he directed.

== Partial filmography ==
Title	Year	Credited as				Notes	Ref(s)
Title	Year	Director	Screenwriter	Screen story writer	Other	Notes	Ref(s)
The Pirate of the Black Hawk	1958		Yes				
Pia of Ptolemy	1958				Yes	Assistant director	
The Loves of Salammbo	1960		Yes		Yes	Assistant director	
Journey Beneath the Desert	1961				Yes	2nd Unit Director	
Ulysses Against the Son of Hercules	1962	Yes	Yes	Yes			
Medusa Against the Son of Hercules	1963		Yes				
Goliath and the Rebel Slave	1963	Yes					
Bullets Don't Argue	1964	Yes					
The Two Gladiators	1964	Yes					
The Terror of Rome Against the Son of Hercules	1964	Yes					
Nightmare Castle	1965	Yes	Yes	Yes			
Vengeance of the Vikings	1965	Yes	Yes				
A Coffin for the Sheriff	—N/a	Yes					
Spies Strike Silently - Le spie uccidono in silenzio	1966	Yes	Yes				
7 pistole per un massacro	1967	Yes					
Ringo the Lone Rider	—N/a		Yes	Yes			
Love Birds - Una strana voglia d'amare	1969	Yes	Yes				
Shadow of Illusion	197?	Yes	Yes	Yes			
Eye in the Labyrinth	1972	Yes	Yes	Yes			
My Name Is Shanghai Joe	—N/a	Yes	Yes	Yes			
Calling All Police Cars	1975	Yes					
Bloody Payroll	1976	Yes	Yes	Yes			
Nazi Love Camp 27	—N/a	Yes	Yes				
Napoli spara!	1977	Yes					
La malavita attacca... la polizia risponde!	1977	Yes	Yes				

== Works cited ==
- Curti, Roberto (2013). Italian Crime Filmography, 1968-1980. McFarland. ISBN 978-0786469765.
- Curti, Roberto (2015). Italian Gothic Horror Films, 1957–1969. McFarland. ISBN 978-1-4766-1989-7.
- Curti, Roberto (2017). Italian Gothic Horror Films, 1970-1979. McFarland. ISBN 978-1476629605.
- Kinnard, Roy; Crnkovich, Tony (2017). Italian Sword and Sandal Films, 1908-1990. McFarland. ISBN 978-1476662916.
