= List of Italian films of 1972 =

A list of films produced in Italy in 1972 (see 1972 in film):

Italian films released in 1972
Title	Director	Cast	Genre	Notes
1931: Once Upon a Time in New York	Luigi Vanzi	Tony Anthony, Adolfo Celi, Richard Conte	Crime	
Alfredo, Alfredo	Pietro Germi	Dustin Hoffman, Carla Gravina, Stefania Sandrelli	Comedy	
All the Colors of the Dark	Sergio Martino	George Hilton, Edwige Fenech, Ivan Rassimov	Giallo	Italian-Spanish co-production
An Animal Called Man	Roberto Mauri	Vassili Karamesinis, Omero Capanna, Gillian Bray	Western	
The Avenger, Zorro	Rafael Romero Marchent	Fabio Testi, Simonetta Vitelli, Riccardo Garrone	Western	
L'amico del padrino	Farouk Agrama	Richard Harrison, Erika Blanc, Krista Nell	—N/a	Italian-Turkish co-production
Un apprezzato professionista di sicuro avvenire	Giuseppe De Santis	Lino Capolicchio, Riccardo Cucciolla, Femi Benussi, Robert Hoffmann	drama	
Arcana	Giulio Questi	Lucia Bosè, Tina Aumont	—N/a	
The Assassin of Rome	Damiano Damiani	Nino Manfredi, Gabriele Lavia	historical drama	
Baron Blood	Mario Bava	Joseph Cotten, Elke Sommer, Massimo Girotti	—N/a	Italian-West German co-production
Beati i ricchi	Salvatore Samperi	Paolo Villaggio, Sylva Koscina	Comedy	
Beau Masque	Bernard Paul	Luigi Diberti	Drama	
Beyond the Frontiers of Hate	Alessandro Santini	Giovanni Scarciofolo, Stefania Nelli, George Cavendish	Western	
La bella Antonia, prima monica e poi dimonia	Mariano Laurenti	Edwige Fenech, Piero Focaccia	Commedia sexy all'italiana	
Ben and Charlie	Michele Lupo	Giuliano Gemma, George Eastman, Marisa Mell	Western	
Bianco, rosso e...	Alberto Lattuada	Sophia Loren, Adriano Celentano	Comedy	
The Black Decameron	Piero Vivarelli	Beryl Cunningham	Comedy	
Black Turin	Carlo Lizzani	Bud Spencer, Françoise Fabian, Andrea Balestri	—N/a	Italian-French co-production
Blood Story	Amasi Damiani	Tony Kendall, Femi Benussi, Philip McNamara	—N/a	
Bloody Friday	Rolf Olsen	Gianni Macchia, Raimund Harmstorf, Amadeus August	—N/a	West German-Italian co-production
Boccaccio	Bruno Corbucci	Alighiero Noschese, Enrico Montesano, Sylva Koscina	Comedy	
The Boldest Job in the West	Jose Antonio de la Loma	Mark Edwards, Fernando Sancho, Carmen Sevilla	Western	Spanish-Italian-French co-production
Brother Sun, Sister Moon (Fratello Sole, Sorella Luna)	Franco Zeffirelli	Graham Faulkner, Judi Bowker	Drama	
A Bounty Killer for Trinity	Joe	Giovanni Scarciofolo, Enzo Pulcrano, Marina Malfatti	Western	
Byleth - The Demon of Incest	Leopoldo Savona	Mark Damon, Claudia Gravy, Aldo Bufi Landi	—N/a	
La calandria	Pasquale Festa Campanile	Lando Buzzanca, Barbara Bouchet, Agostina Belli	Comedy	
Caliber 9	Fernando Di Leo	Gastone Moschin, Barbara Bouchet, Mario Adorf	—N/a	
The Call of the Wild	Ken Annakin	Charlton Heston, Michèle Mercier, Raimund Harmstorf	Western	British-French-German-Italian-Spanish co-production
Can Be Done... Amigo	Mauizio Lucidi	Bud Spencer, Jack Palance, Renato Cestiè	Western	Italian-French-Spanish co-production
Casa d'appuntamento	Ferdinando Merighi	Anita Ekberg, Barbara Bouchet	giallo	
Il caso Pisciotta	Eriprando Visconti	Tony Musante, Carla Gravina	historical drama	
The Canterbury Tales	Pier Paolo Pasolini	Hugh Griffith, Laura Betti, Ninetto Davoli, Franco Citti	Erotic, Comedy	Golden Bear winner at Berlin. Second film in Pasolini's 'Trilogy of Life'. Spoken in English
The Case of the Bloody Iris	Giuliano Carnimeo	Edwige Fenech, George Hilton, Paola Quattrini	Giallo	
Una cavalla tutta nuda	Franco Rossetti	Don Backy, Barbara Bouchet, Renzo Montagnani	Commedia sexy all'italiana	
Chronicle of a Homicide	Mauro Bolognini	Massimo Ranieri, Martin Balsam, Turi Ferro	Crime	
Il coltello di ghiaccio	Umberto Lenzi	Carroll Baker, Evelyn Stewart	Giallo	
Crime Boss	Alberto De Martino	Antonio Sabàto, Telly Savalas, Paola Tedesco	—N/a	
The Dead Are Alive	Armando Crispino	Alex Cord, Samantha Eggar, John Marley	horror	
The Deadly Trackers	Tanio Boccia	Richard Harrison, Anita Ekberg, Dada Gallotti	Western	
Death Played the Flute	Angelo Pannaccio	Michael Forest, Franco Borelli, Giuseppe Cardillo	Western	
Devil in the Brain	Sergio Sollima	Keir Dullea, Stefania Sandrelli	Giallo	
Django... Adios	Roberto Mauri	Brad Harris, Jose Torres, Vassili Karamesinis	Western	
Don't Torture a Duckling (Non si sevizia un paperino)	Lucio Fulci	Barbara Bouchet, Tomas Milian, Irene Papas, Florinda Bolkan	Giallo	Acclaimed giallo noted for its dark subject matter on child killings.
Doppia coppia con Regina	Julio Buchs	Marisa Mell, Gabriele Ferzetti	thriller	
I due gattoni a nove code... e mezza ad Amsterdam	Osvaldo Civirani	Franco and Ciccio	Comedy	
The Eroticist	Lucio Fulci	Lando Buzzanca, Lionel Stander, Laura Antonelli	Commedia sexy all'italiana	
Execution Squad	Mario Caiano	Enrico Maria Salerno, Mariangela Melato, Cyril Cusack	Poliziotteschi	Italian-West German co-production
Eye in the Labyrinth	Mario Caiano	Rosemary Dexter, Adolfo Celi, Alida Valli	horror	
The Fabulous Trinity	Ignacio F Iquino	Richard Harrison, Fernando Sancho, Fanny Grey	Western	
Fiorina la vacca	Vittorio De Sisti	Janet Agren, Gastone Moschin, Ornella Muti	Comedy	
Frankenstein 80	Mario Mancini	John Richardson, Gordon Mitchell, Dalila Di Lazzaro	—N/a	
Gang War in Naples	Pasquale Squitieri	Fabio Testi, Jean Seberg, Raymond Pellegrin	—N/a	Italian-French co-production
Il generale dorme in piedi	Francesco Massaro	Ugo Tognazzi, Mariangela Melato	Commedia all'italiana	
Go Away! Trinity Has Arrived in Eldorado	—N/a	Gordon Mitchell, Stelvio Rosi, Craig Hill	Western	
God in Heaven...Arizona on Earth	Juan Bosch	Peter Lee Lawrence, Maria Pia Conte, Roberto Camardiel	Western	Spanish-Italian co-production
God is My Colt	Luigi Batzella	Giovanni Scarciofolo, Donal O'Brien, Krista Nell	Western	Italian-German co-production
The Grand Duel	Giancarlo Santi	Lee Van Cleef, Horst Frank, Alberto Dentice	Western	Italian-French-German co-production
The Great Treasure Hunt	Tonino Ricci	Mark Damon, Rosalba Neri, Stelvio Rosi	Western	Italian-Spanish co-production
A Gunman Called Dakota	Mario Sabatini	Gordon Mitchell, Mario Novelli, Bill Vanders	Western	
Hallelujah & Sartana Strike Again	Mario Sicilliano	Ron Ely, Alberto Dell'Acqua, Uschi Glas	Western	Italian-German co-production
The Hassled Hooker	Eriprando Visconti	Terence Hill, Paola Pitagora, Martin Balsam	Crime	
Hector the Mighty	Enzo G. Castellari	Vittorio Caprioli, Giancarlo Giannini	Comedy	
His Name Was Holy Ghost	Giuliano Carnimeo	Gianni Garko, Pilar Velázquez, Cris Huerta	Western	Italian-Spanish co-production
La prima notte di quiete	Valerio Zurlini	Alain Delon, Giancarlo Giannini, Sonia Petrovna	Drama, Romance	
The Infamous Column	Nelo Risi	Helmut Berger, Vittorio Caprioli, Francisco Rabal	historical drama	
The Italian Connection	Fernando Di Leo	Henry Silva, Mario Adorf, Woody Strode	Crime	Italian-West German co-production
It Can Be Done Amigo	Maurizio Lucidi	Bud Spencer, Jack Palance	Spaghetti Western	
Jesse & Lester: Two Brothers in a Place Called Trinity	—N/a	Richard Harrison, Donal O'Brien, Gino Marturano	Western	
Jus primae noctis	Pasquale Festa Campanile	Lando Buzzanca, Renzo Montagnani, Marilù Tolo	comedy	
Kill the Poker Player	Mario Bianchi	Robert Woods, Nieves Navarro, Frank Braña	Western	Italian-Spanish co-production
The Killer is on the Phone	Alberto De Martino	Telly Savalas, Anne Heywood, Rossella Falk	giallo	
Last Tango in Paris (Ultimo Tango a Parigi)	Bernardo Bertolucci	Marlon Brando, Maria Schneider	Romantic Drama	
Life Is Tough, Eh Providence?	Giulio Petroni	Tomas Milian, Gregg Palmer, Janet Ågren	Western	Italian-French-German co-production
Liza (La cagna)	Marco Ferreri	Catherine Deneuve, Marcello Mastroianni	drama	
Lo chiameremo Andrea	Vittorio De Sica	Nino Manfredi, Mariangela Melato	Commedia all'italiana	
Long Arm of the Godfather	Nardo Bonomi	Adolfo Celi, Peter Lee Lawrence, Erika Blanc	—N/a	
Ludwig	Luchino Visconti	Helmut Berger, Romy Schneider, Silvana Mangano, Trevor Howard, Helmut Griem, Umberto Orsini	Historical drama	David di Donatello winner. There's a restored long version. It's about Ludwig II of Bavaria
The Master and Margaret	Aleksandar Petrović	Ugo Tognazzi, Mimsy Farmer	fantasy	
The Master Touch	Michele Lupo	Kirk Douglas, Giuliano Gemma, Florinda Bolkan	Crime	Italian-West German co-production
The Mattei Affair (Il caso Mattei)	Francesco Rosi	Gian Maria Volonté, Luigi Squarzina, Franco Graziosi	Political drama	Palme d'Or winner at the 1972 Cannes Film Festival. Based on the death of Enrico Mattei
Miss Dynamite	Sergio Grieco	Antonio Sabàto, Marisa Mell, Fernando Sancho	Western	Italian-German-Spanish co-production
La Mortadella (Lady Liberty)	Mario Monicelli	Sophia Loren, William Devane, Gigi Proietti, Susan Sarandon, Danny DeVito	Comedy	
Lucifera: Demon Lover	Paolo Lombardo	Edmund Purdom, Rosalba Neri	Horror	
The Magnificent West	Gianni Crea	Vassili Karamesinis, Dario Pino, Gordon Mitchell	Western	
Man Called Amen	Alfio Caltabiano	Luc Merenda, Sydne Rome	Western	
Man of the East	Enzo Barboni	Terence Hill, Gregory Walcott, Henry Carey Jr.	Western	Italian-French-Yugoslavian
Man from the Deep River	Umberto Lenzi	Ivan Rassimov, Me Me Lai	horror	
The Mighty Anselmo and His Squire	Bruno Corbucci	Alighiero Noschese, Enrico Montesano, Erminio Macario	Comedy	
More Sexy Canterbury Tales	Joe D'Amato	Monica Audras, Attilio Dottesio, Ari Hanow	decamerotico	
La morte accarezza a mezzanotte	Luciano Ercoli	Susan Scott, Peter Martell	Giallo	
The Most Wonderful Evening of My Life	Ettore Scola	Alberto Sordi, Michel Simon, Pierre Brasseur	Commedia all'italiana	
My Dear Killer	Tonino Valerii	George Hilton, Marilù Tolo	Giallo	
My Horse... My Gun... Your Widow	Juan Bosch	Craig Hill, Claudie Lange, Cris Huerta	Western	Italian-Spanish co-production
Naked Girl Killed in the Park	Alfonso Brescia	Robert Hoffmann, Adolfo Celi	Giallo	
The Night of the Devils	Giorgio Ferroni	Gianni Garko, Agostina Belli, Roberto Maldera		Italian-Spanish co-production
Not Dumb, The Bird	Jean Delannoy	Françoise Rosay, Anny Duperey, Bruno Pradal	Comedy crime	Co-production with France and West Germany
Now They Call Him Sacramento	Alfonso Balcázar	Michael Forest, Fernando Bilbao, Malisa Longo	Western	Spanish-Italian co-production
The Adventures of Pinocchio	Giuliano Cenci	Renato Rascel, Lauro Gazzolo	animated film	
Il provinciale	Luciano Salce	Gianni Morandi, Maria Grazia Buccella	Comedy	
La ragazza dalla pelle di luna	Luigi Scattini	Zeudi Araya, Ugo Pagliai, Beba Lončar	erotic	
The Red Headed Corpse	Renzo Russo	Farley Granger, Erika Blanc, Krista Nell	Giallo	
The Red Queen Kills Seven Times	Emilio Miraglia	Barbara Bouchet, Ugo Pagliai, Sybil Danning	Giallo	Italian-West German co-production
The Return of Clint the Stranger	Alfonso Balcázar	George Martin, Klaus Kinski	Western	
Return of Halleluja	Giuliano Carnimeo	George Hilton, Lincoln Tate	Western	Italian-German-French co-production
Return of the Holy Ghost	Roberto Mauri	Vassili Karamesinis, Craig Hill, Remo Capitani	Western	
The Ribald Decameron	Giuseppe Vari	Malisa Longo, Orchidea De Santis	Commedia sexy all'italiana	
Tough Guy	Franco Prosperi	Robert Blake, Catherine Spaak, Ernest Borgnine	Film noir	
Roma	Federico Fellini	Peter Gonzales Falcon, Pia De Doses, Alvaro Vitali	Felliniesque	Cannes Award
La schiava io ce l'ho e tu no	Giorgio Capitani	Lando Buzzanca, Catherine Spaak	Comedy	
The Scientific Cardplayer (Lo scopone scientifico)	Luigi Comencini	Alberto Sordi, Silvana Mangano, Joseph Cotten, Bette Davis, Mario Carotenuto	Commedia all'italiana	2 David di Donatello
The Seduction of Mimi (Mimí metallurgico ferito nell'onore)	Lina Wertmüller	Giancarlo Giannini, Mariangela Melato	Commedia all'italiana	Entered into the 1972 Cannes Film Festival
Seven Blood-Stained Orchids	Umberto Lenzi	Rossella Falk, Antonio Sabàto	Giallo	
Shadows Unseen	Camillo Bazzoni	Frederick Stafford, Marilù Tolo, Franco Fabrizi	—N/a	Italian-French-West German co-production
Shoot Joe, and Shoot Again	Emilio Miraglia	Richard Harrison, Jose Torres, Franca Polesello	Western	Italian-Spanish co-production
The Sicilian Checkmate	Florestano Vancini	Enrico Maria Salerno, Gastone Moschin, Mario Adorf	—N/a	
The Sicilian Connection	Ferdinando Baldi	Ben Gazzara, Silvia Monti, Fausto Tozzi	—N/a	
Il sindacalista	Luciano Salce	Lando Buzzanca, Paola Pitagora	Comedy	
Slap the Monster on Page One	Marco Bellocchio	Gian Maria Volonté, Laura Betti	Drama	
Smile Before Death	Silvio Amadio	Jenny Tamburi, Rosalba Neri	Giallo	
Sonny and Jed	Sergio Corbucci	Tomas Milian, Susan George, Telly Savalas	Western	Italian-Spanish-German co-production
So Sweet, So Dead	Roberto Bianchi Montero	Farley Granger, Sylva Koscina	Giallo	
Spirits of Death	Romano Scavolini	Evelyn Stewart, Luigi Pistilli, Ivan Rassimov	—N/a	
Sting of the West	Enzo G. Castellari	Jack Palance, Lionel Stander	Western	
Summertime Killer	Antonio Isasi-Isasmendi	Ben Gazzara, Silvia Monti, Fausto Tozzi	—N/a	Spanish-French-Italian co-production
Sweet Deception	Édouard Molinaro	Annie Girardot, Philippe Noiret, Madeleine Renaud	Comedy	Co-production with France
Tarzan and the Brown Prince	Manuel Caño	Steve Hawkes	Jungle adventure	
Le Tueur	Denys de La Patellière	Jean Gabin, Fabio Testi, Uschi Glas	Crime	French-Italian-West German co-production
They Believed He Was No Saint	Juan Bosch	Anthony Steffen, Daniel Martin, Tania Alvardo	Western	Spanish-Italian co-production
They Call Him Amen	Alfio Caltabiano	Luc Merenda, Alfio Caltabiano, Tano Cimarosa	Western	
They Call Him Varitas	Luigi Perelli	Mark Damon, Pat Nigro, Pietro Ceccarelli	Western	
This Kind of Love	Alberto Bevilacqua	Jean Seberg, Ugo Tognazzi	drama	
Thunder Over El Paso	Roberto Bianchi Montero	Antonio Sabàto, Chris Avram, Erika Blanc	Western	Italian-Spanish co-production
Tragic Ceremony	Riccardo Freda	Camille Keaton, Luciana Paluzzi, Luigi Pistilli	Horror	
Trinity and Sartana are Coming	Mario Siciliano	Alberto Dell'Acqua, Harry Baird, Beatric Pella	Western	
The Two Faces of Fear	Tulio Demicheli	George Hilton, Luciana Paluzzi	giallo	Spanish-Italian co-production
Two Sons of Trinity	Osvaldo Civirani	Franco and Ciccio, Lucreita Love	Western	
Ubalda, All Naked and Warm	Mariano Laurenti	Edwige Fenech, Pippo Franco	Commedia sexy all'italiana	
L'uccello migratore	Steno	Lando Buzzanca, Rossana Podestà	Comedy	
L'udienza	Marco Ferreri	Enzo Jannacci, Claudia Cardinale, Vittorio Gassman	comedy-drama	Entered into the 22nd Berlin International Film Festival
The Valachi Papers	Terence Young	Charles Bronson, Lino Ventura	Crime	
Valerie Inside Outside	Brunello Rondi	Barbara Bouchet, Pier Paolo Capponi, Erna Schürer	drama	
Your Vice Is a Locked Room and Only I Have the Key	Sergio Martino	Edwige Fenech, Beba Lončar, Anita Strindberg	Giallo	
Watch Out Gringo! Sabata Will Return	Pedro Luis Ramirez	George Martin, Fernando Sancho, Vittorio Richelmy	Western	
The Weapon, the Hour & the Motive	Francesco Mazzei	Renzo Montagnani, Eva Czemerys	Giallo	
What Am I Doing in the Middle of the Revolution?	Sergio Corbucci	Vittorio Gassman, Paolo Villaggio	Western	Italian-Spanish co-production
What Have You Done to Solange?	Massimo Dallamano	Fabio Testi, Cristina Galbó	Giallo	
When Women Lost Their Tails	Pasquale Festa Campanile	Senta Berger, Lando Buzzanca, Frank Wolff	Comedy	
When Women Were Called Virgins	Aldo Grimaldi	Edwige Fenech, Vittorio Caprioli	Commedia sexy all'italiana	
Winged Devils	Duccio Tessari	Riccardo Salvino, Barbara Bouchet	Adventure	
Without Family	Vittorio Gassman	Vittorio Gassman, Paolo Villaggio	Commedia all'italiana	
Who Killed the Prosecutor and Why?	Giuseppe Vari	Lou Castel, Beba Lončar, Adolfo Celi	Crime	
Who Saw Her Die? (Chi l'ha vista morire? )	Aldo Lado	George Lazenby, Anita Strindberg, Adolfo Celi	Crime	
You Are a Traitor and I'll Kill You	Manuel Esteba	Pierre Brice, Giuseppe Cardillo, Fernando Sancho	Western	Spanish-Italian co-production
You're Jinxed, Friend, You've Met Sacramento	Giorgio Cristallini	Ty Hardin, Christian Hay, Jenny Atkins	Western	
