= Spirits of Death =

- Directed by: Romano Scavolini
- Screenplay by: Giuseppe Mangione; Remigio Del Grosso
- Story by: Giuseppe Mangione
- Produced by: Franca Luciani
- Starring: Ida Galli; Luigi Pistilli; Ivan Rassimov; Pilar Velázquez
- Cinematography: Romano Scavolini
- Edited by: Francesco Bertuccioli
- Music by: Fiorenzo Carpi
- Production company: KMG Cinema
- Distributed by: Regional
- Release date: 30 November 1972 (Italy)
- Running time: 92 minutes
- Country: Italy
- Box office: ₤65.564 million

Spirits of Death (Italian: Un bianco vestito per Marialé, lit. 'A White Dress for Mariale') is a 1972 Italian film directed by Romano Scavolini and starring Ida Galli, Ivan Rassimov and Luigi Pistilli. The film was also released as Exorcisme Tragique ('Tragic Exorcism').

== Plot ==
As a child, Mariale witnesses her father shooting dead her mother and her mother's lover before her father kills himself. She later becomes a recluse, isolated with her husband and their servant in a dark, gloomy castle. Mariale decides to invite some friends over for the weekend and stages a decadent orgiastic party. Then a series of grisly murders occur.

== Cast ==
- Ida Galli as Marialè
- Ivan Rassimov as Massimo
- Shawn Robinson as Semy
- Luigi Pistilli as Paolo
- Pilar Velázquez as Mercedes
- Carla Mancini
- Ezio Marano as Sebastiano
- Gianni Dei as The Lover of Marialè's Mother

== Style ==
Although the film is often described as a giallo, film historian Roberto Curti stated that it only becomes a violent murder mystery about an hour into the film. Curti described the giallo trademarks of violent murders and a twist ending are marginal when compared to other films of the genre at the time. Curti opined that the film was like a perverse kammerspiel which borrowed from both Gothic and avant-garde theatre.

== Release ==
Spirits of Death was released in Italy on 30 November 1972. The film grossed 65.564 million Italian lire in Italy on its release. When the film was released later in France, it was titled Exorcisme tragique to try and bank on the popular success of The Exorcist.

== Reception ==
In a retrospective review, Curti stated that Scavolini's direction and Fiorenzo Carpi's score "cannot overcome the script's many shortcomings – namely, sketchily developed characters, pretentious dialogue, heavy-handed symbolism." Scavolini later referred to the film as one "which only deserves to be forgotten"

== See also ==
- List of Italian films of 1972
