= The Case of the Scorpion's Tail =

1971 film by Sergio Martino

- Italian theatrical poster by Averardo Ciriello
- Italian: La coda dello scorpione
- Directed by: Sergio Martino
- Screenplay by: Eduardo M. Brochero; Ernesto Gastaldi; Sauro Scavolini
- Story by: Eduardo M. Brochero
- Produced by: Luciano Martino
- Starring: George Hilton; Anita Strindberg; Alberto de Mendoza; Evelyn Stewart; Luigi Pistilli; Janine Reynaud
- Cinematography: Emilio Foriscot; Giancarlo Ferrando
- Edited by: Eugenio Alabiso
- Music by: Bruno Nicolai
- Production companies: Devon Film; Copercines Cooperativa Cinematográfica
- Distributed by: Titanus (Italy); Rosa Films (Spain)
- Release dates: 16 August 1971 (Italy); 2 February 1972 (Spain)
- Running time: 93 minutes
- Countries: Italy; Spain
- Box office: ITL 687 million (Italy); Pta 19,6 million (Spain)

The Case of the Scorpion's Tail (Italian: La coda dello scorpione) is a 1971 giallo film directed by Sergio Martino, co-written by Ernesto Gastaldi, and starring George Hilton, Anita Strindberg, Alberto de Mendoza, Ida Galli, Luigi Pistilli, and Janine Reynaud. The film follows a string of murders occurring after the sudden death of a businessman with a valuable life insurance policy.

== Plot ==
In London, Lisa Baumer, who is engaged in an extramarital affair with George Barnet, is informed that her husband Kurt has died in a plane explosion en route to Tokyo and that she will receive a life insurance payout of $1 million in Athens. Lisa's former lover Philip threatens to expose a possibly incriminating letter from her unless she pays him off for it. A man murders Philip in his apartment and steals the letter before Lisa arrives.

Lisa travels to Athens, followed by insurance investigator Peter Lynch. At the hotel restaurant, Lisa tells Peter that she knows his identity and that she did not kill her husband. Lisa goes to meet Kurt's mistress Lara and her hitman Sharif, who murdered Philip and stole the letter, unbeknownst to Lisa. Lara accuses Lisa of planning the death of Kurt, who she says intended to divorce Lisa, marry Lara, and make her his beneficiary. Lara threatens to blackmail Lisa or have Sharif kill her if she refuses to sign half the payout over to Lara. Lisa escapes, aided by Peter. The next day, Lisa cashes the insurance check and plans to catch an evening flight to Tokyo for a rendezvous with Barnet. Peter is nearly run over by Sharif while investigating Kurt's villa. Lisa is later murdered in her hotel room, and the insurance money is stolen.

Police inspector Stavros, working with Interpol agent Stanley, informs Peter that he is a suspect and confiscates his passport. Peter tails Stanley to Lara's apartment. Lara insists that she did not kill Lisa. Sharif nearly kills the eavesdropping Peter and flees. Peter accuses Lara of having Lisa killed and trying to kill him, which she denies. Peter meets Cléo, a journalist assigned to the case, and the two start a romantic affair and investigate together. Sharif ransacks Peter's hotel room but finds no evidence to implicate Peter in Lisa's murder. Lara and Sharif are later murdered. Stanley informs Cléo about the murders. After Peter leaves Cléo's apartment, a figure tries to murder her. Peter returns, having forgotten his car keys, and the figure flees. Afterward, Stanley discovers a scorpion-shaped cufflink on the floor.

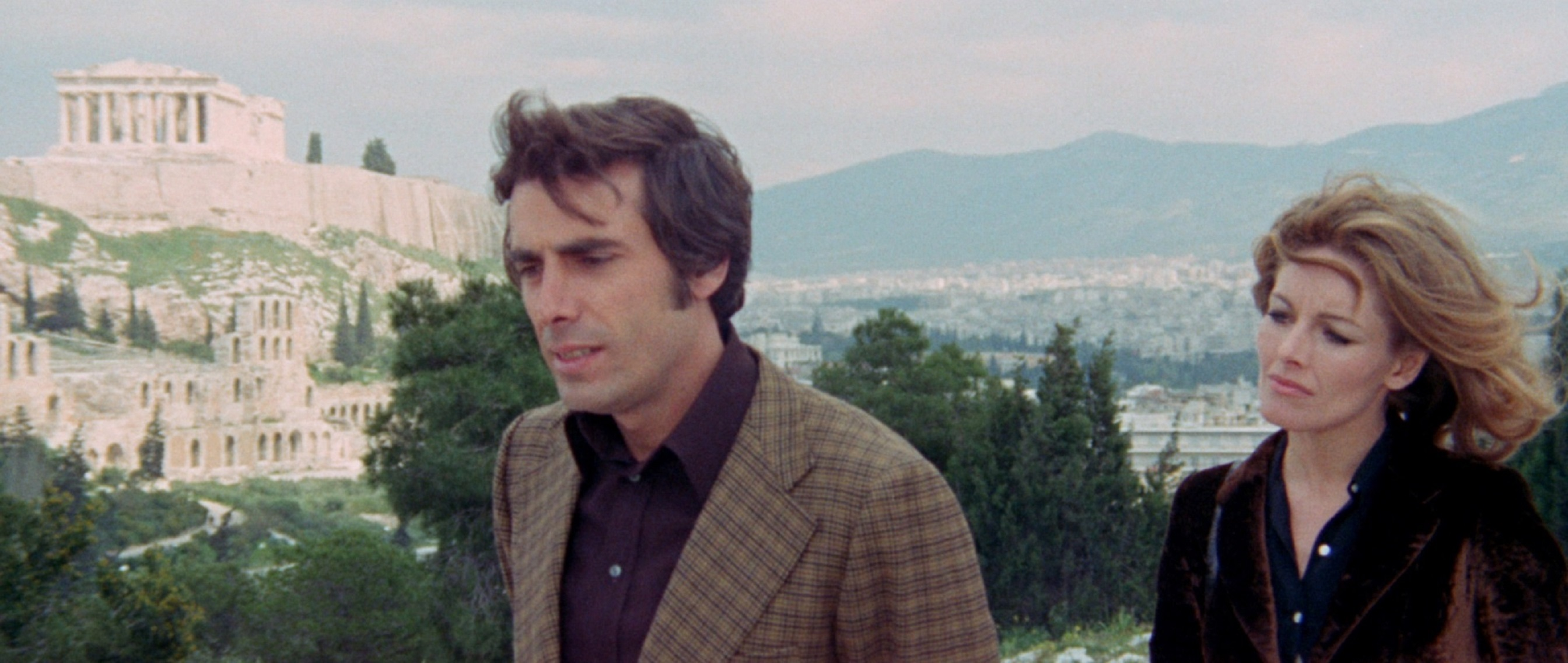
George Hilton and Anita Strindberg in a scene from the film

Lisa's lover Barnet is murdered in the Athens hotel room of his mistress; the pair are revealed to be flight attendants. Peter obtains a photograph of Kurt wearing a scorpion cufflink. Peter, Cléo, Stavros, and Stanley theorize that Kurt faked his own death, possibly with Barnet's help, then murdered Lisa, Lara, Sharif, and Barnet to claim the insurance payout and frame Peter. They arrange for Peter to take a vacation with Cléo in the Saronic Gulf, pretending that he is a fugitive in order to lull Kurt into a false sense of security.

During Peter's and Cléo's getaway, Cléo observes Peter scuba diving into a cave with a sack allegedly containing spare harpoons and other equipment, then emerging with the sack apparently empty. Later, while he sleeps on the boat, Cléo investigates the cave and discovers the sack with $1 million inside. Peter apprehends her and takes her back to the boat, where he reveals that he had Barnet plant a bomb in Kurt's plane, after which Peter stole the payout from Lisa and killed her, Lara, Sharif, and finally Barnet, who had attacked Cléo and dropped the scorpion cufflink to make the authorities suspect Kurt. Peter asks Cléo to escape with him, but she rushes to the radio to call for help, stabs Peter's shoulder, and flees ashore with Peter in pursuit. Peter attacks Cléo, but police suddenly shoot him dead. They deduced Peter's scheme from Barnet's mistress's mermaid brooch, which was of similar make to the counterfeit scorpion cufflink. After Cléo recovers in a hospital, Stavros sends her off in a taxi with Stanley, who suggests that he would like to take her on a date.

== Cast ==
- George Hilton as Peter Lynch
- Anita Strindberg as Cléo Dupont
- Ida Galli (Note: Credited as 'Evelyn Stewart'.) as Lisa Baumer
- Janine Reynaud as Lara Florakis
- Alberto de Mendoza as John Stanley
- Luigi Pistilli as Inspector Stavros
- Tom Felleghy as Mr. Brenton
- Luis Barboo as Sharif
- Lisa Leonardi as Hostess
- Tomás Picó as George Barnet
- Fulvio Mingozzi (Note: Uncredited.) as Kurt Baumer

== Production ==
=== Development ===
The Case of the Scorpion's Tail was Sergio Martino's second giallo after the commercially successful The Strange Vice of Mrs. Wardh. Like the prior film, it was a 70/30 co-production between Devon Film of Rome (owned by Sergio's brother Luciano) and Eduardo Manzanos Brochero's Copercines of Madrid. Also like its predecessor, it was primarily written by Ernesto Gastaldi and featured an insurance-related plot loosely inspired by an Italian true crime, the Giovanni Fenaroli case. The star of Mrs. Wardh, Luciano Martino's favorite actress and soon-to-be wife Edwige Fenech, was pregnant with her son Edwin and could not participate. Her co-lead George Hilton did return, and far preferred this film to the former, deeming it to be his best giallo alongside My Dear Killer. At an early stage, the project was sometimes identified as The Golden Scorpion.

=== Filming ===
Production started in early April 1971 in Greece, which was chosen due to financial incentives. That part of the shoot was organized by Aegian Film of Athens, with whom Luciano Martino had already worked on Web of Deception (Il sorriso del ragno), filmed the previous year in the same country. As part of the agreement, Greek citizen Costas Roussos was hired as assistant director. Although the two films' stories had little in common, Martino found formal inspiration in Greek director Costa-Gavras' Z, whose realism led him to make his leanest giallo in terms of style. The majority of filming took place in the Athens area, with the climax set on Vráchos Pondikóniso, a small island located to the southeast of the capital.

Interiors were shot in Rome, mostly at Elios Studios. Additional scenes took place in London, as part of a subplot created to lengthen the film after it came up short. Spaniard Luis Barboo, who played the stalker, offered to travel there on short notice, but they were done with a skeleton crew and Martino himself stood in for Barboo in a few brief instances.

== Release ==
=== Trailer ===
The Case of the Scorpion's Tail is noted for its bombastic trailer. It starts with brightly colored, intense stills taken from four classics of European cinema (below right), which the voiceover then attempts to conflate with Martino's film into a single artistic lineage, despite seemingly wide differences in genre and historical significance.

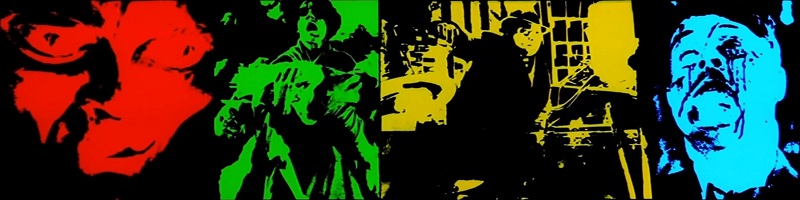
The case of the scorpion's tail trailer montage

1920: The Golem, directed by Paul Wegener and Henrik Galeen
1926: Battleship Potemkin, directed by Sergei Eisenstein
1930: M, directed by Fritz Lang
1931: L'Age d'or, directed by Luis Buñuel

Four pictures. Four masterpieces of violence.
Today, it is Sergio Martino who brings back the expressive violence of early cinema with... The Scorpion's Tail.

— The Case of the Scorpion's Tail trailer narration (translated from Italian)

=== Theatrical ===
In Italy the film was released by Titanus on 16 August 1971, and arrived in Rome on 20 August. It grossed ITL 687 million, up slightly from Mrs. Wardh.

In Spain, it was released as La cola del escorpión (lit. "The Scorpion's Tail") by Distribuidora cinematograficas Rosa Films and opened in Barcelona on 2 February 1972, reaching Madrid on 30 October 1972. It drew 573,496 patrons for a gross of Pta 19,6 million.

In Greece, the film was released as I avgi ton mavron stileton ('Dawn of the Black Stilletos').

== Reception ==
=== Contemporary ===
Achille Valdata of La Stampa wrote: "From a coldly calculated plot that has been designed at the desk, with every element positioned according to the manual, has been assembled another of those imitative thrillers, to which the favors of our producers go since the success of Argento's movies." However, he conceded that "in this case, it benefits from efficient narrative tension and actors who belong in their role." A staffer for L'Unità found that the picture "does not distinguish itself from the other filmic examples of the same genre due to the gratuitousness of a plot open to all (and no) solutions (there is even a callback to Blow Up in the scorpion cufflink that appears by way of a photographic enlargement)". Segnalazioni cinematografiche, a Catholic film magazine, deemed that "[t]he characters, used as simple mechanisms inside a gear system, show an absolute lack of consistency, just like the whole story which ends up paradoxical and implausible."

A.M.T. of La Vanguardia española deemed that "Sergio Martino has skillfully combined the elements of this intrigue, which quickly turns into a top-notch thriller. Every happening is laden with unsettling questions. And almost every character who appears on screen could be the abominable wanted criminal." He acknowledged that "[m]any of the film's chilling episodes would hardly withstand close scrutiny. But the truth is, one shouldn't be too demanding. [...] It's simply about entertaining the audience by keeping them intrigued, no matter the cost. And this modest aspiration is easily achieved." In Marca, R. Capilla assessed that Martino offered "an interesting display of suspense thanks to the continuous appearance and disappearance of suspects, clues and corpses", while "the staging of Greece's tourism landmarks adds an alluring backdrop to the complicated plot" and "George Hilton manages the various expressions that his double-dealing role demands".

=== Retrospective ===
Donald Guarisco of AllMovie found that the film "never succumbs to the baroque stylistic eccentricities for which the genre is known" which, coupled with "genuinely nerve-jangling" suspense and "solid performances", make it "good entry-level fare for those new to Italian thrillers." In his giallo compendium Blood & Black Lace, Adrian Luther Smith called it "one of the best of Sergio Martino's impressive batch of thrillers. Besides a jigsaw puzzle of a plot, it has considerable energy, some pleasing exotic locations and is crammed with a great cast of shady characters. [...] The resulting gory carnage is graphically presented."

== Soundtrack ==
The film's score was composed, orchestrated and conducted by Bruno Nicolai. It was belatedly released on a CD from Italian label Digitmovies in 2004, as Volume IV of their Bruno Nicolai in Giallo collection. Also on that disc is the vocal track Shadows, whose lyrics were written by Audrey Nohra and performed by Annibale Giannarelli (as David King). It did not appear in the finished film but, later that year, served as the B-side for "Diana", a theme song created by the same team for the hit miniseries Come un uragano.

=== In popular culture ===
The main theme from The Case of the Scorpion's Tail opens, and is one of several vintage tracks featured in, the 2009 Franco-Belgian film Amer by Hélène Cattet and Bruno Forzani, a filmmaking couple who mix auteur cinema and 70s kitsch.

== Post-release ==
=== Photonovels ===
The Case of the Scorpion's Tail has received photonovel adaptations in Italian magazine Cinesex Attualità and Spanish counterpart Big Film.

=== Home media ===
A domestic VHS of the film was released by Videogram Italia, circa 1991. In 2005, it was issued on DVD, both in Italy by Alan Young Pictures and in the U.S. by NoShame Films. In 2014, a DVD was released in Spain as part of distributor Regia Films' Cinema Giallo collection, although the local-language track is in Catalan rather than Spanish. The film was brought to U.K. and U.S. Blu-ray by Arrow Video in 2018.

=== Related works ===
In 1982, Gastaldi and the Martinos partnered again on The Scorpion with Two Tails, which was released as a feature and, less widely, as a television miniseries. The story again revolves around a scorpion-shaped piece of jewelry, but it is entirely disconnected from the older film and leans more into fantasy.
