= The Strange Vice of Mrs. Wardh =

1971 film by Sergio Martino

- Italian theatrical release poster
- Italian: Lo strano vizio della Signora Wardh
- Directed by: Sergio Martino
- Screenplay by: Eduardo M. Brochero; Ernesto Gastaldi; Vittorio Caronia
- Story by: Eduardo M. Brochero
- Produced by: Luciano Martino; Antonio Crescenzi
- Starring: George Hilton; Edwige Fenech; Cristina Airoldi; Manuel Gil; Carlo Alighiero; Ivan Rassimov; Alberto de Mendoza
- Cinematography: Anton Giulio Borghesi; Giancarlo Ferrando
- Edited by: Eugenio Alabiso
- Music by: Nora Orlandi
- Production companies: Devon Film; Copercines Cooperativa Cinematográfica
- Distributed by: Interfilm (Italy); Regia Arturo González Rodríguez (Spain)
- Release dates: 15 January 1971 (Italy); 12 June 1972 (Spain)
- Running time: 100 minutes
- Countries: Italy; Spain
- Budget: ITL 170 million
- Box office: ITL 612 million (Italy); Pta 15.2 million (Spain)

The Strange Vice of Mrs. Wardh (Italian: Lo strano vizio della Signora Wardh) is a 1971 giallo film directed by Sergio Martino, and starring George Hilton, Edwige Fenech, Cristina Airoldi, Manuel Gil, Carlo Alighiero, Ivan Rassimov, and Alberto de Mendoza. Fenech plays an American diplomat's wife in Austria, who finds herself stalked by her abusive former lover (Rassimov), and blackmailed for cheating on her husband (de Mendoza) with a playboy (Hilton).

The film was an Italian and Spanish co-production. It was the first of several gialli produced by Luciano Martino with Fenech, after parting ways with American star Caroll Baker. Now regarded as a classic of the genre, it received a retrospective screening at the 61st Venice International Film Festival in 2004.

== Plot ==
After spending time in New York City, Julie Wardh and her diplomat husband Neil return to Vienna, where several women have recently been murdered by a suspect wielding a straight razor. Julie is delivered a flower bouquet with a sinister note from Jean, her former lover, with whom she had a sadomasochistic relationship that became abusive. At a high-society party, Julie's friend Carol introduces her Australian cousin George. Carol's and George's wealthy uncle has just died, and they are his only heirs. George flirts with Julie, who is unhappy in her marriage to the neglectful Neil. Julie leaves the party after noticing Jean, but Jean confronts her outside, alluding to their past and offering to drive her home. Neil intervenes and slaps Jean, who laughs and leaves.

After a lunch date arranged by Carol, Julie and George begin a romantic affair, despite Julie's initial reluctance. Julie receives an anonymous call from a blackmailer demanding 20,000 schillings not to tell Neil about the affair. Julie suspects Jean is the blackmailer, and Carol insists on meeting the blackmailer for Julie in Schönbrunn Palace Park, where she is murdered by an assailant wielding a straight razor. Julie learns about Carol's murder and urges the police to investigate Jean, but Jean has an alibi. Julie is later attacked in the parking garage of her apartment building by a figure with a straight razor, but she escapes. After she tells Neil about the encounter, he arms himself with a handgun and orders her to take him to Jean's residence. There, the pair discover Jean in a bloody bathtub.

Terrified of staying in Vienna, Julie secretly leaves Neil to travel to Sitges with George. Back in Vienna, one of the razor killer's intended victims kills him in self-defense. Julie is relieved after learning that the dead killer was a stranger to her, but someone continues to stalk her in Spain and sends her a note signed "Jean", causing her to have a nervous breakdown. When George goes to get a doctor, Julie is ambushed and knocked out with chloroform by Jean, who faked his death. He stages the kitchen to look like Julie has committed suicide by carbon monoxide poisoning. George and the doctor arrive to find Julie locked in the kitchen, from which they quickly remove her, and the doctor tries to resuscitate her as George calls for an ambulance.

At the police station, the police inform George and Neil, who has been summoned from Vienna, that Julie has died and that her death has been ruled a suicide. Neil angrily accuses George of murder, despite his being with the doctor. George secretly meets Jean, whom he hired to kill Julie. Jean demands his promised payment and fake passport so that he can flee to Rio de Janeiro, but George shoots him dead and stages his death as a suicide.

George meets with Neil, and their car ride conversation reveals that they conspired to murder Carol and Julie. Carol's death makes George the sole inheritor of his uncle's fortune, and Julie's death yields a huge insurance payment for Neil to avoid bankruptcy. To give each other alibis and shift suspicion onto the razor killer, Neil killed Carol in the park, and George tried to kill Julie in the parking garage, then hired Jean to kill her after the death of the razor killer and Jean's faked death.

Neil sees Julie standing on the side of the road, and he and George are suddenly pursued by police vehicles. While trying to evade the police, George and Neil drive off a cliff to their deaths. It is revealed that the doctor resuscitated Julie, but the police faked her death to trick George and Neil into meeting, having grown suspicious when Carol's death did not fit the razor killer's modus operandi. Julie is consoled by the doctor as they drive away.

== Cast ==
- George Hilton as George Corro
- Edwige Fenech as Julie Wardh
- Conchita Airoldi (credited as Cristina Airoldi) as Carol Brandt
- Manuel Gil as Dr. Harbe
- Carlo Alighiero as Police Inspector
- Ivan Rassimov as Jean
- Alberto de Mendoza as Neil Wardh
- Bruno Corazzari as the razor killer
- Marella Corbi as the flight attendant
- Miguel del Castillo as doctor in Sitges
- Luis de Tejada as inspector in Stiges
- Anne Pouchie (credited as Pouchie) as shower victim
- Mira Vidotto as housemaid

== Production ==
=== Development and writing ===
Although this was Sergio Martino's first giallo as a director, he had worked as a production manager on a pair of Caroll Baker vehicles, The Sweet Body of Deborah (1968) and So Sweet... So Perverse (1969), which his brother Luciano produced and co-wrote with Ernesto Gastaldi. The film was announced as just La signora Ward. Budgeted at ITL 170 million, it was a 70/30 joint venture between Luciano Martino's Devon Film of Rome and Eduardo Manzanos Brochero's Copercines of Madrid, a regular of Italian co-productions.

It shares influences with the Baker movies, such as that of Gastaldi's favorite Les Diaboliques. The plot also draws inspiration from the Genaro Fenaroli case, a life insurance murder that became a media sensation in Italy. By the time Dario Argento's giallo The Bird with the Crystal Plumage became a hit, the screenplay was already finished, but a serial killer angle was added by Martino to exploit the former's formula.

The film begins with a quote from Sigmund Freud's Thoughts for the Times on War and Death. One of Jean's cards to Julia reads "Your vice is like a room locked from the inside and only I have the key". A poster for Lucio Fulci's contemporary giallo A Lizard in a Woman's Skin features an Edgar A. Poe quote, which is widely accepted as fictional and reads similarly to Jean's message. Fulci has claimed to be the one who originated the phrase, although this remains uncorroborated.

=== Casting ===
This was Edwige Fenech's second giallo after a supporting role in Mario Bava's Five Dolls for an August Moon, as well as her second collaboration with the Martinos after the erotic drama Madame Bovary (1969), which Luciano had co-produced and for which Sergio had directed additional scenes.

According to George Hilton, his friendship with Fenech predated her relationship with Luciano, and he had been relied upon by the smitten producer to make introductions, which was rewarded with a part in this film. The Uruguayan, with whom she would form an enduring on-screen couple, graduated from a supporting role in The Sweet Body of Deborah. Hilton also recommended his Argentinian friend Alberto de Mendoza to Luciano.

This was the feature debut of Cristina "Conchita" Airoldi, who had a modest acting career but found greater acclaim as a producer.

=== Filming ===
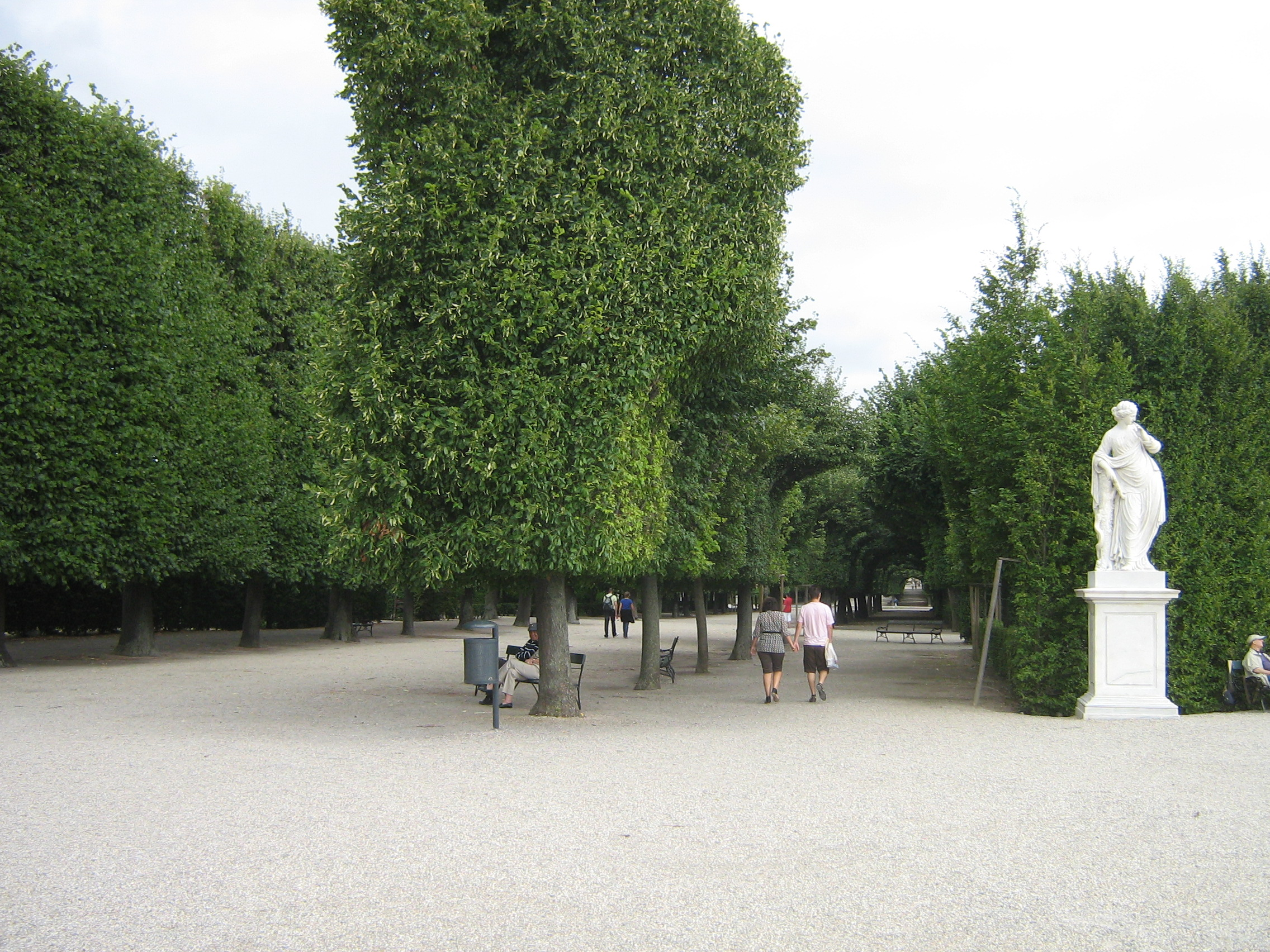
The Schönbrunn Palace Park.

Photography started on 24 August 1970 and lasted 36 days, of which 10 were spent in Austria, eight in Spain and 18 in Italy. Austria was inserted due to the distributor's belief that the Italian public was more likely to accept crime stories set abroad. The regions of Vienna, with a murder scene shot at Schönbrunn Palace Park, and Semmering were visited.

Spanish filming took place in and around Sitges, Catalonia. The shoot was bookended by interiors, and some ancillary exteriors, in Rome. Interiors were a mix of locations and sets built at Elios Studios. The fictional Stephan Residence, where Julie Wardh lives, was a composite of the Haus des Buches (a Vienna library), for exteriors, and Casa Papanice in Rome, for its vivid interiors designed by noted architect Paolo Portoghesi.

Although Spaniard Emilio Foriscot was credited to satisfy coproduction regulations, the actual cinematographer was Italian Anton Giulio Borghesi, except for Austrian scenes which were entrusted to (credited) camera operator Giancarlo Ferrando and director of production Floriano Trenker.

While the film was made with English-language export in mind, including alternate shots for written notes, it was primarily acted in Italian on set. By the end of production, it was referred to by its eventual title.

== Release ==
=== Pre-release ===
The letter "h" was added to the name "Ward" when an Italian woman named Mrs. Ward threatened legal action over the original title potentially damaging her good name, just before the film was released. In Spain, the character kept the patronym "Ward". Part of a sex scene between Hilton and Fenech was cut by censorship during the film's initial domestic run, but later reintegrated on ancillary media.

=== Domestic ===
In Italy, the film was distributed by Interfilm, which carried many Martino productions at the time. Some sources date the film's Rome opening on 15 January 1971, but this may have been an industry event, as the general-interest press puts it on 11 February. It grossed ITL 612 million during its domestic run. In Spain, it was released by Regia Arturo González as La perversa señora Ward (lit. "The Perverse Mrs. Ward") and opened in Madrid on 12 June 1972. It drew 536,503 admissions for a gross Pta 15.2 million in the country.

=== United States ===
In the U.S., the film was distributed by Gemini Films and Maron Releasing. It opened in New York City on 6 August 1971 as Next!. The U.S. release was credited to MLR Films and Laurie International. For later dates, the film was retitled The Next Victim, although this was likely only a poster retitling.

== Critical reception ==
=== Contemporary ===
Despite being considered a classic of the giallo genre by modern film critics and giallo aficionados, many contemporaneous reviewers were unimpressed with the film, troubled by its themes of sadomasochistic sex and violence and nudity. Segnalazioni cinematografiche, a Catholic film magazine, summed up the movie as "an artificial and incongruous thriller, full of tropes and tasteless effects." A staff review for L'Unità dismissed the story as "a pretext to show buttocks and breasts" and noted that "[t]his Strange Vice does not belong to Mrs. Wardh (obvious victim of the husband who wants to cash in on insurance money) but to some directors (in this case Sergio Martino), whose mental vice is considering the audience like a mass of idiots". R.B. of El Adelantado de Segovia found the Spanish title just as hyperbolic, yet representative of a tale "too cluttered, too far-fetched, too clumsy in its execution—full of dead air, staging flaws, etc.—and too boring, so that it only starts to work and become somewhat interesting in the last ten minutes. It's not worth making these kinds of co-productions, really." A.M.T. of La Vanguardia española granted that "poor Mrs. Ward is by no means that perverse" and that the film had "moments where it difficult for the viewer to grasp what's going on. However, it is filled with shocks, some of them chilling, much to the delight of those members of the audience who favor scary and violent films." As such, they concluded that it "quietly fulfills its artistic aspirations."

Robert L. Jerome of American magazine Cinefantastique deemed that the combination of Caroll Baker-style giallo and American influences resulted in a "largely unoriginal stew", lamenting that "the scripters attempt to pile twist upon twist in order to keep a few jumps ahead of the audience, which has anticipated the ending from reel one. The cast, left to the mercy of dubbing, looks more attractive than it sounds". Howard Thompson writing in the New York Times in August 1971 described the film as "a flat, flabby pancake of a suspense melodrama," declaring that "Anyone willing to shell out good money to watch a razor slashing and hacking human flesh, with some casual nudity and Viennese backgrounds added, is welcome to this picture". Wanda Hale of the New York Daily News wrote that the Italian producers "made a gosh-awful mess in trying to make an American murder mystery type of film. She added that "[t]he plot wouldn't be so bad if it wasn't so obvious. Europeans speaking for the American characters they portray are unintentionally funny. Edwige Fenech is a very beautiful actress, playing a very stupid woman. The cameraman gives so many closeups of her he retards suspense to the point of boredom."

=== Retrospective ===
Donald Guarisco of AllMovie assessed that "Sergio Martino's first entry into Italy's giallo genre delivers everything this style of thriller requires and then some", calling it "a skillful example of how the giallo can be a head-spinning experience in style over substance." Adrian Smith of Cinema Retro praised "an entertaining thriller which continues to enthrall and fascinate fans". He found the plot "an interesting blend of Hitchcock's Frenzy (1972) and Clouzot's Les Diaboliques (1955), with more red herrings and plot twists than an M. Night Shyamalan film." However, he conceded that Fenech was frequently seen "running around looking scared or confused, seemingly to pad out the running time".

== Soundtrack ==
The film's score was composed by Nora Orlandi, who had worked on The Sweet Body of Deborah. It was recorded at Rome's Dirmaphon Studios and conducted by Paolo Ormi. It was released for the first time on a CD from new label Hexacord in 2000. It made its vinyl debut from Hexacord and Cinedelic Records in 2002. Veteran British critic John Mansell has called it "one of her best works for cinema". The "Dies Irae" theme iterates on Orlandi's own work for 1969's A doppia faccia.

== Post-release ==
=== Special screenings ===
The film was shown during the 61st Venice Festival in 2004, as part of a selection of Italian genre films curated by Quentin Tarantino and Joe Dante. It also received a screening at the 2001 Sitges Festival.

=== Home media ===
GVR Realvision of Italy and Major Video of Spain brought the film to domestic videocassette. A U.S. tape arrived in 1984 through Regal Video, as Blade of the Ripper. That edition suffered from a very poor video transfer and new, digitally composited credits, but retained most of the violence. Video Gems reissued it in 1985 as The Next Victim. That version boasted higher visual fidelity but excised much of the graphic content.

In 2005, the film was reissued by Alan Young Home Video of Italy, based on a recent digital master used for the Venice Festival screening. This was billed as its DVD premiere. A U.S. edition arrived the same year from NoShame Films. In 2017, U.K. label Shameless Screen Entertainment released what was billed as its Blu-ray premiere. Later that year, Cecchi Gori Entertainment launched a crowd funding campaign for an Italian special edition Blu-ray in collaboration with genre magazine Nocturno, but it was not successful. U.S. distributor Severin Films brought its own Blu-ray to market in 2020.

=== Photonovels ===
The film was adapted into photonovels in the 4 October 1971 issue of Italian magazine Cinesex attualità, and in the November 1977 edition of the French magazine CinEscandale. The latter was translated into English and reprinted by distributor Severin in 2020, to coincide with their Blu-ray reissue of the film.

=== Conference ===
In 2015, an international academic conference entitled "The Strange Vice of Mrs. Wardh and the Giallo" was hosted around the film in Rome. It was organized by the Austrian Historical Institute, Sheffield Hallam University and the Cineteca Nazionale.

=== Related works ===
Fenech went on to do three more gialli for producer-turned-husband Luciano Martino in 1971–72: All the Colors of the Dark, The Case of the Bloody Iris and Your Vice Is a Locked Room and Only I Have the Key, whose title was derived from a scene in this movie, although it is not a sequel. All of these were written or co-written by Gastaldi. Two were directed by Sergio Martino and featured Ivan Rassimov as another threatening figure. Two of them co-starred George Hilton. Hilton also starred in the Martinos' The Case of the Scorpion's Tail (1971), a similar insurance story filmed right after this one, but from which Fenech was absent.

=== Unofficial remakes ===
An unlicensed remake was made in Turkey in 1972 as Aşka Susayanlar: Seks ve Cinayet (lit. 'Thirsty for Love: Sex and Murder'), as part of a trend of appropriation of Italian material by the local film industry. Another Turkish version, Çırpınış (lit. 'Spasms'), was released in 1980 and takes a more pornographic tone. The 1995 giallo, The Strange Story of Olga O., which was co-written by Gastaldi, also revisits some elements of this film. The ice cube trick makes a reappearance in another giallo produced by the Martinos in 1994, La ragazza di Cortina.

== In popular culture ==
A variant of Orlandi's "Dies Irae" was later reused by Quentin Tarantino as a recurring theme in the film Kill Bill: Volume 2.

Hélène Cattet and Bruno Forzani, a director couple who mix auteur cinema and throwbacks to 1970s Italian exploitation, have paid several tributes to the film. A scene from The Strange Colour of Your Body's Tears (2013) is patterned after one of Julia Wardh's flashbacks, and Orlandi's "Sequence 25" is included on the soundtrack for Reflection in a Dead Diamond (2025).

Several genre historians, as well as Italy's critic of record Paolo Mereghetti, have posited the influence of the Schönbrunn Palace Park murder on a similar scene in Dario Argento's Four Flies on Grey Velvet.

== See also ==
- List of Italian films of 1971
