= Island of the Fishmen =

- Italian theatrical release poster
- Directed by: Sergio Martino
- Screenplay by: Sergio Martino; Sergio Donati; Cesare Frugoni
- Story by: Luciano Martino; Cesare Frugoni
- Produced by: Luciano Martino
- Starring: Barbara Bach; Claudio Cassinelli; Richard Johnson; Joseph Cotten
- Cinematography: Giancarlo Ferrando
- Edited by: Eugenio Alabiso
- Music by: Luciano Michelini
- Production companies: Dania Film; Medusa Cinematografica
- Distributed by: Medusa Distribuzione (Italy); New World Pictures (United States)
- Release dates: 18 January 1979 (Italy); 26 June 1981 (U.S.)
- Running time: 100 minutes (Italy); 93 minutes (Sweden); 81 minutes (United States); 85 minutes (West Germany); 99 minutes (Finland)
- Countries: Italy; United States
- Languages: Italian; English

Island of the Fishmen or Island of Mutations (Italian: L'isola degli uomini pesce) is a 1979 action-horror film directed by Sergio Martino, starring Barbara Bach, Joseph Cotten and Richard Johnson.

In 1980, about 30 minutes of footage was removed from the original film and replaced with new material for international release. This version was first given the title Something Waits in the Dark; it was re-edited and re-released in 1981 as Screamers.

== Plot ==
It is the year 1891 and a military doctor, Lieutenant Claude de Ross (Claudio Cassinelli) a survivor of not one, but two shipwrecks, washes ashore on a mysterious and uncharted Caribbean island along with a handful of convicts. When several of these convicts meet unfortunate ends at the hands of the titular fishmen, Claude and the other survivors flee into the jungle, only to encounter the sadistic Edmond Rackham (Richard Johnson) and his beautiful captive Amanda Marvin (Barbara Bach).

Amanda's father, Professor Ernest Marvin (Joseph Cotten), a once-famed biologist, has discovered a way to transform humans into amphibious creatures and controls their every move. Rackham manipulates Marvin into performing the procedure upon both willing and unwilling participants by assuring him that his work is undertaken for purely scientific and humanitarian motives (Marvin hopes to reduce strain on the world food supply by creating a race of people who can live in the resource-untapped ocean). Having discovered the lost city of Atlantis beneath the waters surrounding the island however, Rackham is in actuality using the half-human monsters to plunder the lost city of its treasures.

Shakira (Beryl Cunningham), a voodoo priestess in the employ of Rackham foretells death and destruction descending upon the island.

The priestess' prophecy is fulfilled as the film ends with Claude and Amanda attempting an escape from a gun-wielding Rackham, a crazed Shakira, uncontrolled fishmen and the very volcano that doomed Atlantis which awakens and threatens to send what unsubmerged landmass remains to oblivion.

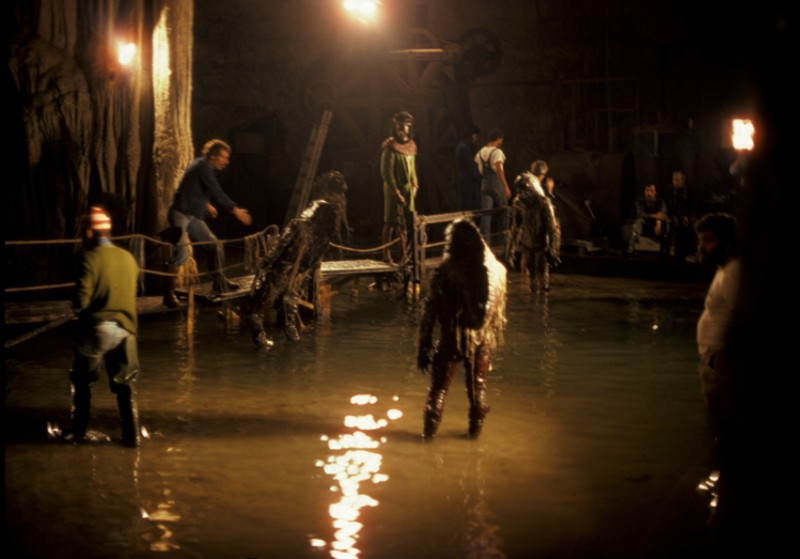
The backstage on the set in Neptune's Grotto

== Cast ==
- Claudio Cassinelli as Lieutenant Claude de Ross
- Barbara Bach as Amanda Marvin
- Richard Johnson as Edmond Rackham
- Joseph Cotten as Professor Ernest Marvin
- Beryl Cunningham as Shakira
- Franco Iavarone as José
- Roberto Posse as Peter
- Giuseppe Castellano as Skip
- Franco Mazzieri as François
- Cameron Mitchell as Decker (US version)
- Mel Ferrer as Radcliffe (US version)
- Eunice Bolt as Samantha (US version)
- Jim Alquist as James (US version)
- Tom J. Delaney as Patterson (US version)
- Bobby Rhodes as Rackman's servant (uncredited)
- Riccardo Petrazzi as the prisoner on the lifeboat (uncredited)

== Production ==
It was one of several Italian exploitation films Richard Johnson made in the 1970s.

== Release ==
Islands of the Fishmen was released in Italy on January 18, 1979.

== Alternate versions ==
After being acquired by American distributors New World Pictures and United Pictures Organization, Miller Drake was hired to pen and helm a new opening for the film. This prologue featured Cameron Mitchell as a sea captain leading a gentleman (Mel Ferrer) who had squandered his family fortune in search of Atlantean treasure on the island.

This footage contained grisly special make-up effects of fishmen-inflicted wounds created by Chris Walas. Changes to the film itself included abbreviated scenes in the original Italian version, with additional musical cues by Sandy Berman, a new English dub track and a new title, Something Waits in the Dark.

After this 1980 release proved unsuccessful, Jim Wynorski spearheaded New World Pictures' re-release of the film. Wynorski re-titled the film (again) into a new version entitled Screamers, with a tag line about "men turned inside out". A scene meant to evoke that tag line was filmed specifically for inclusion in a trailer designed to lure in audiences who had failed to give Something Waits in the Dark much notice. However, New World were forced to splice the footage from that trailer onto all theatrical prints, after misled customer caused riots at drive-ins. It was never included in the film's negative print, therefore the scene is absent in the video version.

== Reception ==
Gene Siskel of the Chicago Tribune gave the film half of one star out of four and remarked, "'Screamers' (a fresh title for what appears to be an old film) never generates any scream."

== Sequel ==
In 1995, Sergio Martino returned to direct a made-for-Italian-TV sequel titled The Fishmen and Their Queen, a.k.a. Queen of the Fishmen.
