= Return of Halleluja =

1972 film

- Directed by: Giuliano Carnimeo
- Written by: Tito Carpi; Ingo Hermes; Giovanni Simonelli
- Story by: Giovanni Simonelli
- Produced by: Dario Sabatello
- Starring: George Hilton; Lincoln Tate
- Cinematography: Stelvio Massi
- Music by: Stelvio Cipriani
- Release date: 1972
- Language: Italian

Return of Halleluja (Italian: Il West ti va stretto, amico... è arrivato Alleluja, also known as The West Is Very Close, Amigo) is a 1972 Italian Spaghetti Western film directed by Giuliano Carnimeo and starring George Hilton. It is the sequel to They Call Me Hallelujah.

== Plot ==
In tumultuous Mexico in the 1860s the revolutionary General Ramirez hires Hallelujah, an American gunfighter, to retrieve a stolen Aztec statue. The general believes having recovered it will bring indigenous Indians over to his cause. Also going after the statue is a Scottish adventurer, his argumentative female companion, a pair of bickering brothers from a religious community, the army, and assorted bandits.

== Cast ==
- George Hilton as Alleluja
- Lincoln Tate as Archie
- Agata Flori as Fleurette
- Raymond Bussières as Sam
- Riccardo Garrone as Zagaya
- Michael Hinz as Von Steffen
- Aldo Barberito as Prete
- Roberto Camardiel as Gen. Ramirez
- Lars Bloch as Caino
- Giovanni Pazzafini as Abele
- Paolo Gozlino as Drake
- Umberto D'Orsi as Ferguson
- Renato Baldini as Ferguson's Henchman
- Peter Berling as Schultz
- Mara Krupp as Mara
- Adriana Facchetti as The Austrian

== See also ==
- List of Italian films of 1972
