= Don't Play with Tigers =

1982 film by Sergio Martino

- Italian theatrical release poster by Enzo Sciotti
- Directed by: Sergio Martino
- Written by: Sergio Martino; Alberto Silvestri; Castellano & Pipolo
- Cinematography: Giancarlo Ferrando
- Music by: Detto Mariano
- Release date: 1982
- Language: Italian

Don't Play with Tigers (Italian: Ricchi, ricchissimi... praticamente in mutande) is a 1982 Italian comedy film directed by Sergio Martino.

== Plot ==
Three segments. Cesare Domenichini is a poor man who, to bring the family to the sea, builds an abusive hut on a nudist beach. The businessman Mario Zamboni, on vacation in Livorno with his wife and his daughter Aurora, gives in to the advances of Frau Kruppe, a rich German woman with a passion for card games. Alberto Del Pra, owner of a shipyard on the brink of bankruptcy, is able to get the assignment to build a super yacht for a wealthy Arab emir, on condition that his wife Francesca would stay a night with him.

== Cast ==
- Pippo Franco: Cesare Domenichini
- Lino Banfi: Mario Zamboni
- Renato Pozzetto: Alberto Del Prà
- Edwige Fenech: Francesca Del Prà
- Janet Agren: Frau Kruppe aka Evelina Krugher
- Adriana Russo: Maria Domenichini
- Néstor Garay: Kuzz Viller aka Federico Partibòn
- George Hilton: Sheik Omar Abdul Youssef El Rāchid
- Daniele Formica: Akim
- Annabella Schiavone: Adalgisa Cavallari
- Pippo Santonastaso: Praetor
- Riccardo Garrone: Admiral Ulderisi

== See also ==
- List of Italian films of 1982
