= They Call Me Hallelujah =

1971 film

- Directed by: Giuliano Carnimeo
- Written by: Tito Carpi
- Produced by: Dario Sabatello
- Starring: George Hilton; Charles Southwood
- Cinematography: Stelvio Massi
- Music by: Stelvio Cipriani
- Release date: 1971
- Language: Italian

They Call Me Hallelujah (Italian: Testa t'ammazzo, croce... sei morto - Mi chiamano Alleluja, also known as Guns for Dollars, Deep West and Heads I Kill You, Tails You're Dead! They Call Me Hallalujah) is a 1971 Italian Spaghetti Western film directed by Giuliano Carnimeo and starring George Hilton. The film spawned a 1972 sequel, Return of Hallelujah, also directed by Carnimeo and starring many of the same actors as in the original.

== Plot ==
In tumultuous Mexico in the 1860s, a band of revolutionaries led by General Ramirez plan to use the jewelry in the possession of the oppressive governing forces to finance their armed struggle. They hire Hallelujah, an American gunfighter, to steal the jewelry for them. He succeeds, but the jewelry turns out to be fake. Hallelujah goes off in pursuit of the real jewels. Also after them is a mysterious fake nun, a flamboyant Russian nobleman, and assorted bandits, soldiers and townspeople.

== Cast ==
- George Hilton as Hallelujah
- Charles Southwood as Alexi
- Agata Flori as Sister Anna Lee
- Robert Camardiel as Gen. Emiliano Ramirez
- Rick Boyd as Duke Slocum
- Paolo Gozlino as Fortune
- Andrea Bosic as Krantz
- Linda Sini as Gertrude
- Aldo Barberito as The Priest
- Franco Pesce as Ebeneezer
- Ugo Adinolfi as Pablito
- Fortunato Arena as The Sheriff
- Furio Meniconi as Glock

== See also ==
- List of Italian films of 1971
