= The Masked Man Against the Pirates =

- Directed by: Vertunnio De Angelis (aka Dean Vert)
- Screenplay by: Aldo Barni; Giorgio Costantini; Vertunnio De Angelis; Dino Sant'Ambrogio
- Produced by: Pino Addario
- Starring: George Hilton; Claude Dantes; Giovanni Cianfriglia; Adriana Ambesi
- Cinematography: Antonio Belviso
- Edited by: Mariano Arditi
- Music by: Alessandro Nadin/Felice di Stefano
- Production companies: Rio Film; Seven Film; Titanus
- Distributed by: Variety Distribution
- Release date: 12 July 1964 (Italy)
- Country: Italy
- Language: Italian

The Masked Man Against the Pirates (Italian: L'uomo mascherato contro i pirati and on some Italian prints as L'Uomo Mascherato Contro Il Corsaro Nero) is a 1964 Italian pirate swashbuckler film co-written and directed by Vertunnio De Angelis and starring George Hilton.

== Plot ==
In 1659, Captain Garcia, the most cunning and ferocious pirate in the waters of the New World, encounters a Spanish galleon camouflaged as merchant ship. When Garcia's ship, the Albatross, comes close and fires a warning shot, the Spanish ship opens fire, hitting the Albatross. Now close enough, the pirates board and put the Spanish ship on fire. Garcia is defeated by the Spanish captain, Gomez, but when Gomez threatens to kill him, he in turn threatens that his men will kill the Spanish prisoners on his pirate island if he does not return. Ruiz, Gomez's officer, still urges Gomez to kill Garcia when Juarez captures Anna, the Spanish princess of Aragon, and the Spanish are forced to surrender.

In his quarters, Juarez approaches Anna, but she prefers staying with the other prisoners. Garcia looks forward to torturing Ruiz and calls for celebration to distribute the bounty. A masked man in green stuns Ruiz's prison guard to pass him a message in his cell. During the celebration, Anna sits next to Garcia to keep him company and witness Ruiz's execution. Ruiz is suspended on a swing with a noose around his neck and Garcia tries to hit the cords with his pistol, when Juarez asks for a duel during which Ruiz jumps off the ship and escapes. As prize for his victory, Juarez asks for Anna. Then, the pirates dance, and the women are brought to their quarters. The guard is whipped. Garcia distributes the bounty, including Ruiz's watch. At the end of the night, Garcia, drunk, tries to enter in Juarez' cabin to be alone with Anna, but is knocked out by the masked man, who kisses Anna.

At daybreak, they reach the pirates' island, where Garcia is welcomed by Rosita. Of the Spanish prisoners, the women are to be incarcerated, the men executed. Garcia tries to convince Juarez to let go of Anna, arguing that he can sell her to Ramirez. Juarez in turn says that they could sell the men instead and get just as much. The men are just about to be hanged when Juarez calls off the execution, afterwards joining Garcia for food and female company. A bellydance concludes the scene.

Ramirez, a slaver, and his female companion Amina arrive, while the masked man discovers Ruiz at the beach and tells him about the danger the men are in. Amina is ready to sell the men in Havana, but Ramirez pleads for their hanging the following day, insisting on not selling men and fearful of the masked man. During a feast (with more bellydancing), Ramirez inspects the female merchandise and haggles with Garcia.

The masked man and Ruiz, both masked and clad in green, overcome the guards, and Ruiz gets back his watch. They free the men, and Ruiz shoots Diego. Meanwhile, Anna is brought to the feast, where Garcia intends to sell her although she belongs to Juarez.

Meanwhile, the escaped Spanish stuttering padre uses the pirate ship's cannon to fire at Ramirez's ship, which causes Ramirez to duel Garcia, when the Spanish prisoners attack, outnumbering and defeating the pirates.

Ramirez takes Ann to a tower, but Amina, jealous, leads the masked man there. Ramirez kills Amina. Garcia fights Ruiz, then tries to escape on the "Albatross". The masked man kills Ramirez, who asked for his identity in vain. Only to Anna, and after a vow of silence since he plans to remain active, does he reveal himself as Juarez.

Garcia is captured by Ruiz on ship and caged; he is to be executed in Spain. Padre Ramon takes his confession.

Juarez explains to Anna that he had to help the pirates capture the women so he could get to Ramirez, which was his mission. They kiss, and he promises to meet her again in Spain.

== Cast ==
- George Hilton as Juarez
- Claude Dantes as Princess Anna of Aragon
- Giovanni Vari (as John Vari) as Captain Pedro Ramon Garcia
- Pietro De Vico as Pedrito
- Tony Kendall as Lieutenant Ruiz
- Gina Rovere as Amina
- Lucien Benetti
- Lucio De Santis as Ramirez
- José Torres as Josh, The Raven
- Mario Zicavo
- Angelo Santiamantini
- Paolo Reale
- Antonio Bullo
- Giorgio Costantini
- Pino Musco

== Release ==
=== Cinematic release ===
The Masked Man Against the Pirates was released in Italy on 12 July 1964.

=== DVD release ===
On 6 May 2011, a DVD with the title Fluch der Piraten II was released in Germany by MCP Sound & Media that contains the German and the English dub of the film.

On 7 October 2014, the film was released in Italy on DVD by Cecchi Gori Home Video under the title 'L'uomo mascherato contro il corsaro nero, containing the Italian dub and optional Italian SDH.
