= The Antichrist (film) =

1974 horror film by Alberto De Martino

- Original release film poster
- Italian: L'anticristo
- Directed by: Alberto De Martino
- Written by: Gianfranco Clerici; Vincenzo Mannino; Alberto De Martino
- Produced by: Edmondo Amati
- Starring: Carla Gravina; Mel Ferrer; Arthur Kennedy; George Coulouris; Alida Valli; Umberto Orsini; Anita Strindberg; Remo Girone
- Cinematography: Aristide Massaccesi
- Edited by: Vincenzo Tomassi
- Music by: Ennio Morricone; Bruno Nicolai
- Production company: Capitolina Produzioni Cinematografiche
- Distributed by: Fida Cinematografica
- Release date: 22 November 1974 (Italy)
- Running time: 112 minutes
- Country: Italy

The Antichrist (Italian: L'anticristo, also released as The Tempter) is a 1974 Italian supernatural horror film directed and co-written by Alberto De Martino, and starring Carla Gravina, Mel Ferrer, Arthur Kennedy, Umberto Orsini, Alida Valli, Remo Girone, Anita Strindberg, and George Coulouris. The musical score was composed by Ennio Morricone and Bruno Nicolai.

The film is widely regarded as a cash-in on The Exorcist, a similarly-themed and widely-successful American film released the previous year. It is considered a cult film.

== Plot ==
Ippolita Oderisi, the adult daughter of wealthy Rome aristocrat Massimo Oderisi, has been paraplegic since a car accident at age 12 that also killed her mother. Doctors have diagnosed the paralysis as psychosomatic, stemming from Ippolita's mental trauma rather than a physical injury. Having been reliant on her father since the accident, Ippolita has developed severe attachment issues, aggravated when she learns that Massimo has begun a relationship with a woman named Greta.

Ippolita visits her uncle Ascanio, a Vatican cardinal, for help. He tells her there's little he can do, but recommends a secular parapsychologist named Marcello Sinibaldi. Dr. Sinibaldi determines that Ippolita has strong extrasensory perception and believes that her disorder is caused by unconscious memories of past lives. Using hypnosis, Sinibaldi causes her to relive the suppressed memories of her namesake ancestor, a witch who was tried by the Inquisition and burned at the stake. The memory of her past life causes Ippolita to be possessed by the spirit of her ancestor, who entered a covenant with Satan before her death. Ippolita regains the ability to walk, but the possession causes her to dissociate, during which time she seduces and murders a tourist.

Eventually, Ippolita is fully possessed during a celebratory dinner with her family. She displays incredible telekinetic powers, and is only subdued by the sound of church bells. Dr. Sinibaldi dismisses the notion of demonic possession, believing the phenomenon is entirely scientific, but Massimo maintains there's no other explanation. He goes to his brother for help, but Ascanio insists there's nothing he can do without permission from higher-ups in the Church. The family maid, Irene, hires a local mystic to attempt an exorcism, but the possessed Ippolita exposes him as a con artist and expels him from her room. Ascanio’s own exorcism likewise fails, as the demon rebukes the Cardinal for turning Ippolita away when she asked for help It reveals that Ippolita’s ancestor renounced him in her dying moments, preventing him from taking her soul, and now intends to finish its original goal of birthing a child through Ippolita’s body.

The Vatican authorizes Father Mittner (implied to be the reincarnation of the original Ippolita’s executioner) to carry out a formal exorcism. The demon tries to stop him through all manner of psychic manifestations and telepathy, revealing that the unborn child of Ippolita will be his son; the Antichrist. Mittner prevails and Ippolita flees the house, her father and brother in pursuit. She reaches the Colosseum, but is felled by the sound of church bells, allowing Massimo to force her hands against an iron cross and finally expelling the demon and its child from her body. Restored, Ippolita’s helps her brother up and walks off with her father as the sun rises.

== Cast ==
- Carla Gravina as Ippolita Oderisi
- Mel Ferrer as Massimo Oderisi
- Arthur Kennedy as Cardinal Ascanio Oderisi
- Remo Girone as Filippo Oderisi
- Umberto Orsini as Dr. Marcello Sinibaldi
- Alida Valli as Irene
- George Coulouris as Father Mittner
- Anita Strindberg as Greta
- Mario Scaccia as the mystic
- Lea Lander as Mariangela
- Ernesto Colli as the possessed man
- John Francis Lane as party guest

== Production ==
Interviewed by Blanco y Negro in 1974, Carla Gravina revealed that she would not accept again a role like that. More she confessed publicly subject to a strange disease which started after shooting. "I feel a kind of general malaise," said Gravina. "Sometimes, it translates into intense cold, others in dizziness, feeling of emptiness, severe headaches, lack of appetite, and so on ". The actress was fearful of the origins of this disease but doctors had diagnosed that, perhaps, it was due to exhaustion from overwork or curious psychic influences.

Carlo Rambaldi helped create the film's special effects.

== Release ==
The Antichrist was released on November 22, 1974 in Italy. It was released in the United States in 1978 by AVCO Embassy Pictures under the title The Tempter.

=== Home media ===
The film was released on Blu-Ray by US boutique label Kino Lorber in September 2022, and on Ultra HD Blu-ray two years later.

== Reception ==
From contemporary reviews, Geoff Brown (Monthly Film Bulletin) stated that "admirers of carbon-copy cinema—if any exist—will be well pleased with Alberto De Martino's The Antichrist" noting that it managed to emulate The Exorcist more closely than the Italian film The Devil Within Her.

In retrospective reviews, AllMovie gave the film a negative review, noting that "long stretches of not a lot happening are supposed to create suspense, but all they do is delay the inevitable finale, which was the original audience's entire reason for being there since they knew it was going to include elements of The Exorcist." The review concluded that The Antichrist "probably was intense, but that intensity has diminished over the years" and that the film was "for Italian horror collectors only."
