= Luciano Martino =

Italian film producer, director (1933–2013)

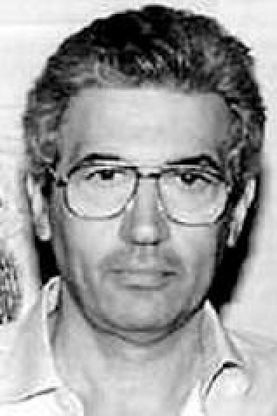
- Martino in the 1970s
- Born: 22 December 1933; Naples, Italy
- Died: 14 August 2013 (aged 79); Malindi, Kenya
- Occupations: Film producer, director, screenwriter
- Spouse: Edwige Fenech (m. 1971; div. 1979)
- Relatives: Sergio Martino (brother)

Luciano Martino (22 December 1933 – 14 August 2013) was an Italian film producer, director and screenwriter.

== Biography ==
Born in Naples, the brother of the director and screenwriter Sergio Martino, he was active in the cinema industry since the early fifties.

After several credits as screenwriter and assistant director he made his directorial debut with the eurospy film Secret Agent Fireball. Among the screenplays he collaborated The Whip and the Body by Mario Bava, Arizona Colt by Michele Lupo and the Lamberto Bava's giallo Delirium. In the seventies he produced and co-wrote a long series of successful commedie sexy all'italiana including Ubalda, All Naked and Warm, Giovannona Long-Thigh and The School Teacher, which launched the career of Edwige Fenech, with whom he was engaged at the time. With the decline of the genre he focused on television, producing TV series and television films.

== Death ==
Martino died of a pulmonary edema in his house in Malindi, Kenya.

== Selected filmography (as producer) ==
- Who Hesitates Is Lost (1960)
- The Warrior Empress (1960)
- Flashman (1967)
- Madame Bovary (1969)
- The Strange Vice of Mrs. Wardh (1971) a.k.a. Blade of the Ripper
- The Case of the Scorpion's Tail (1971)
- All the Colors of the Dark (1972)
- Your Vice Is a Locked Room and Only I Have the Key (1972)
- The Case of the Bloody Iris (1972)
- My Horse, My Gun, Your Widow (1972)
- The Violent Professionals (1973)
- Slave of the Cannibal God (1978)
- The Great Alligator River (1979)
- Island of the Fishmen (1979)
- Concorde Affaire '79 (1979)
- Eaten Alive! (1980)
- Cannibal Ferox (1980)
- The Scorpion with Two Tails (1982)
- Ironmaster (1983)
- A Blade in the Dark (1983)
- 2019, After the Fall of New York (1983)
- Blastfighter (1984)
- Miami Golem (1985)
- Hands of Steel (1986) a.k.a. Fists of Steel, a.k.a. Atomic Cyborg
