= George Hilton (actor) =

Uruguayan actor (1934–2019)

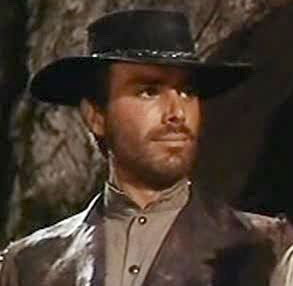
- Hilton in Any Gun Can Play (1967)
- Born: Jorge Hill Acosta y Lara; 16 July 1934; Montevideo, Uruguay
- Died: 28 July 2019 (aged 85); Rome, Italy
- Occupation: Actor
- Years active: 1956–2019

George Hilton (born Jorge Hill Acosta y Lara; 16 July 1934 – 28 July 2019) was a Uruguayan actor, best known for his roles in spaghetti Westerns. Sometimes credited as Jorge Hilton, he appeared in over 20 Euro-Westerns as well as several giallo and action films.

Born in Montevideo, Hilton moved to Italy in 1963, before he got the lead role in the 1964 Italian pirate swashbuckler film The Masked Man Against the Pirates. The film that launched him to fame was Massacre Time (1966), while his roles as Sartana in the 1970 film Sartana's Here… Trade Your Pistol for a Coffin and Hallelujah in the 1971 film They Call Me Hallelujah made him a spaghetti Western star.

== Early life ==
Hilton was born Jorge Hill Acosta y Lara in Montevideo on 16 July 1934. His maternal grandfather, Manuel Acosta y Lara, was a founder of the La Mañana newspaper. He was of partial English descent.

== Career ==
Hilton began his career working in radio. In 1955, he moved to Argentina, adopting the pseudonym Jorge Hilton. He soon began to appear in several soap operas and film production for Argentina's domestic market. In 1963, he moved to Italy, following the footsteps of other famous South American actors such as the Argentines Jorge Rigaud and Alberto de Mendoza, who were attracted by the thriving Italian film industry of the 1960s. After Anglicizing his first name to 'George', he got the lead role in The Masked Man Against the Pirates (Il corsaro nero nell'isola del Tesoro, 1965) and appeared in the Franco and Ciccio Bond spoof comedy Due mafiosi contro Goldginger, directed by Giorgio Simonelli.

=== Spaghetti Western star ===
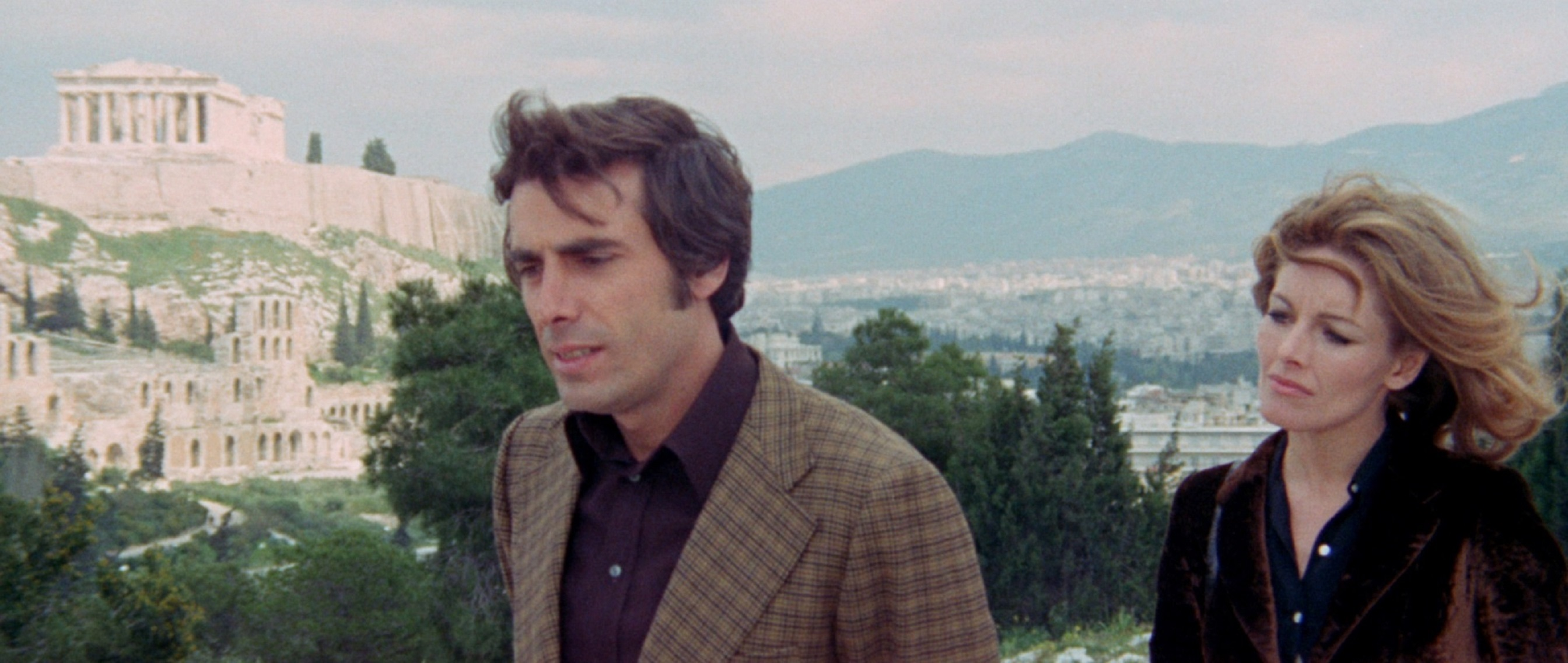
Hilton and Anita Strindberg in The Case of the Scorpion's Tail (1971)

His career in the Euro-Western genre was launched by director Lucio Fulci with the film Massacre Time (1966), starring Franco Nero, where his supporting role made him an instant icon in the genre. In 1967 he appeared to even greater effect as "Stranger" in Any Gun Can Play (also known as Go Kill and Come Back) with Edd Byrnes and Gilbert Roland. In the following year he participated in seven productions, enhancing his international reputation and garnering him significant attention, especially in Spain. Soon Hilton became one of the major stars of spaghetti Westerns, eventually playing Sartana in the last film of the "Sartana" series, Sartana's Here… Trade Your Pistol for a Coffin, after Gianni Garko left the role. His most famous character is arguably that of the gunslinger Allelujah (or Hallelujah) in They Call Me Hallelujah (1971), created with director Giuliano Carnimeo, who also directed the sequel involving the same character in Return of Hallelujah (1972) as well as Man Called Invincible (1973), in which Hilton played Tresette, another of his famous roles.

=== Giallo ===
Besides Westerns, Hilton was well-known as a leading man in numerous "gialli" films throughout the 1970s, including many considered to be classics of the giallo genre, often playing suave and successful businessmen or dashing playboy roles. He frequently collaborated with director Sergio Martino, starring in The Strange Vice of Mrs. Wardh (1971), The Case of The Scorpion's Tail (1971), and All the Colors of the Dark (1972) as well as starring in other well-known giallo including The Sweet Body of Deborah (1968), The Case of the Bloody Iris (1972), Tonino Valerii's My Dear Killer (1972) and The Killer Must Kill Again (1975). Hilton also featured in more conventional crime and action films after the spaghetti Western craze ended in the 1980s.

=== Later roles ===
During the 1990s, Hilton appeared mostly in television series. In his last years Hilton reduced his film appearances but nevertheless remained active, being still fondly remembered as one of the biggest stars of Italian cinema, along with Terence Hill, Franco Nero and Giuliano Gemma. His legacy as a film star also remained intact, with Hilton asked to do many interviews and retrospectives on his film career on a regular basis.

== Death ==
On 28 July 2019, Hilton died at a clinic in Rome, Italy, at the age of 85, after suffering of a long undisclosed illness. The funeral was held the next day at 4.30 pm local time, at the Santa Maria in Montesanto in Piazza del Popolo.

== Selected filmography ==
- Los tallos amargos (1956)
- Después del silencio (1956) – Minor Role
- Una viuda difícil (1957)
- Alto Paraná (1958) – Luis
- El bote, el río y la gente (1960)
- La procesión (1960)
- Los que verán a Dios (1963)
- Las modelos (1963)
- The Masked Man Against the Pirates (1964) – Suarez
- Two Mafiosi Against Goldfinger (1965) – 007
- Massacre Time (1966) – Jeff 'Slim' Corbett
- Two Sons of Ringo (1966) – Joe
- Kitosch, the Man Who Came from the North (1967) – David Kitosch
- Poker with Pistols (1967) – Ponson
- Il tempo degli avvoltoi (1967) – Kitosch
- A Ghentar si muore facile (1967) – Teddy Jason
- Her Harem (1967) – (uncredited)
- Any Gun Can Play (1967) – The Stranger / Lo Straniero / Django / - un cacciatore di taglie
- Halleluja for Django (1967) – Billy 'Rum' Cooney
- Red Blood, Yellow Gold (1967) – Tim Dooley
- The Ruthless Four (1968) – Manolo Sanchez
- The Sweet Body of Deborah (1968) – Robert Simack
- The Moment to Kill (1968) – Lord
- One More to Hell (1968) – Johnny King
- Trusting Is Good... Shooting Is Better (1968) – Glenn Reno
- The Battle of El Alamein (1969) – Lt. Graham
- La battaglia del deserto (1969) – Captain George Bradbury
- Salt in the Wound (1969) – Michael Sheppard
- A Bullet for Sandoval (1969) – Corporal John Warner
- Siete minutos para morir (1969) – Mike Russo
- Sartana's Here... Trade Your Pistol for a Coffin (1970) – Sartana
- The Strange Vice of Mrs. Wardh (1971) – George Corro
- They Call Me Hallelujah (1971) – Alleluja
- The Case of the Scorpion's Tail (1971) – Peter Lynch
- The Devil Has Seven Faces (1972) – Tony Shane
- My Dear Killer (1972) – Inspector Luca Peretti
- All the Colors of the Dark (1972) – Richard Steele
- The Two Faces of Fear (1972) – Dr. Roberto Carli
- The Case of the Bloody Iris (1972) – Andrea Antinori
- Return of Hallelujah (1972) – Alleluja
- Holy God, Here Comes the Passatore! (1973) – Stefano Pelloni, il 'Passatore'
- Man Called Invincible (1973) – Tresette / Tricky Dicky
- Contratto carnale (1973) – James McDougall
- Seven Hours of Violence (1973) – George Anderson
- Di Tresette ce n'è uno, tutti gli altri son nessuno (1974) – Tresette / Tricky Dicky
- The Silkworm (1974) – Didier
- The Killer Must Kill Again (1975) – Giorgio
- Trinity Plus the Clown and a Guitar (1975) – Johnny Chitara / Johnny Guitar
- Mark of Zorro (1975) – Philip Mackintosh / Don Alba de Mendoza
- Taxi Girl (1977) – Ramon
- El Macho (1977) – Hidalgo, the Duke
- Sweetly You'll Die Through Love (1977) – Carlos
- Double Game (1977) – Insp. Ugo Moretti
- Blazing Flowers (1978) – Commissioner Morani
- El lugar del humo (1979)
- Teste di quoio (1981) – Capo Terrorista Boodoostano
- Don't Play with Tigers (1982) – Prince Omar Abdul Yussef El Rahid
- The Secret Nights of Lucrezia Borgia (1982) – Duccio
- The Atlantis Interceptors (1983) – Professor Peter Saunders
- College (1984)
- Dinner with a Vampire (1989, TV Series) – Jurek
- Double Game (1989)
- College (1990, TV Series) – Colonnello Madison
- Abbronzatissimi 2 – Un anno dopo (1993) – Alfredo
- Prestazione straordinaria (1994) – Miccichè
- Fireworks (1997) – Gerard de la Fasse
- Cient' anne (1999) – Mauro De Angelis
- Killer's Playlist (2006) – Commissario
- Natale in crociera (2007) – Comandante della Nave
- Un coccodrillo per amico (2009)
