= The Scorpion with Two Tails =

- Italian theatrical release poster by Enzo Sciotti
- Directed by: Sergio Martino
- Screenplay by: Ernesto Gastaldi; Maria Chianetta
- Story by: Ernesto Gastaldi; Dardano Sacchetti
- Produced by: Luciano Martino
- Starring: Elvire Audray; Paolo Malco; Claudio Cassinelli; Marilù Tolo; Wandisa Guida
- Cinematography: Giancarlo Ferrando
- Edited by: Eugenio Alabiso; Daniele Alabiso
- Music by: Fabio Frizzi
- Production companies: Dania Film; Medusa Distribuzione; Imp.Ex.Ci.Sa.; Les Films Jacques Leitienne
- Distributed by: Medusa
- Release dates: 17 September 1982 (Italy); 24 August 1983 (France)
- Running time: 98 minutes
- Countries: Italy; France

The Scorpion with Two Tails (Italian: Assassinio al cimitero etrusco, lit. 'Murder in the Etruscan Cemetery') is a 1982 film directed by Sergio Martino.

== Plot ==
Joan has nightmares of Etruscan sacrifices. She knows very well the Etruscan language and her husband Arthur is an archeologist studying Etruscan tombs. In her nightmare, she foresees her husband's death. And Arthur is then killed in the same way the Etruscans killed their sacrifice victims, convincing her that someone (or something) may be after her as well.

== Cast ==
- Elvire Audray as Joan Barnard
- Paolo Malco as Mike Grant
- Claudio Cassinelli as Paolo Dameli
- Marilù Tolo as Countess Maria Volumna
- John Saxon as Arthur Barnard
- Van Johnson as Mulligan, Joan's father
- Wandisa Guida as Heather Hull
- Gianfranco Barra as Commissioner
- Franco Garofalo as Gianni Andrucci
- Maurizio Mattioli as Masaccio
- Carlo Monni as Senaldi

== Production ==
The Scorpion with Two Tails originally started life as an 8-part television series to be titled Il mistero degli Etruschi or Lo scorpione a due code. Two original scripts are located in the SIAE archives, one signed by Ernesto Gastaldi and one by Dardano Sacchetti in 1982. The French film producer Jacques Leitienne is also listed in the credits as a co-writer, but this was purely for bureaucratic reasons.

Shooting lasted for four months in Volterra, Cerveteri, Formello, New York City and at R.P.A. Elios Studios in Rome. Although originally made for television, the film was shot on 16mm and blown up to 35mm for its theatrical release.

== Release ==
The Scorpion with Two Tails was distributed theatrically in Italy by Medusa on 17 September 1982. It was distributed in France as Crime au cimetière étrusque on 24 August 1983. In the late 1980s, the series was purchased by Reteitalia to be shown as a two-part feature for Canale 5. This abridged version was re-edited by Claudio Lattanzi but was never shown on Canale 5.

Sergio Martino later regretted the film saying "it didn't add anything to my career, not even from an economic standpoint."

== See also ==
- List of Italian films of 1982

== Footnotes ==
=== Sources ===
- Curti, Roberto (2019). Italian Gothic Horror Films, 1980-1989. McFarland. ISBN 978-1476672434.
