= Luigi Pistilli =

Italian actor (1929–1996)

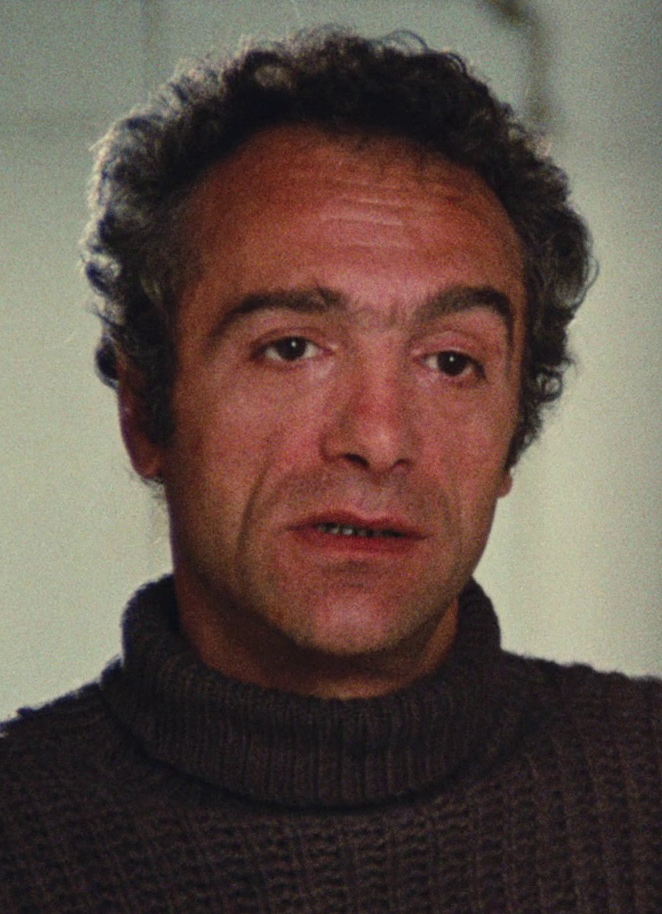
- Pistilli in Your Vice Is a Locked Room and Only I Have the Key (1972)
- Born: 19 July 1929; Grosseto, Kingdom of Italy
- Died: 21 April 1996 (aged 66); Milan, Italy
- Resting place: Cori, Latina, Italy
- Occupation: Actor

Luigi Pistilli (19 July 1929 – 21 April 1996) was an Italian actor. During his lifetime, he was one of Italy's most respected actors of stage, screen, and television; on stage, he was considered one of the country's finest interpreters of Bertolt Brecht's plays, including The Threepenny Opera and St Joan of the Stockyards.

He is known to Italian horror movie buffs mainly for his three 1972 thrillers Twitch of the Death Nerve, Iguana with the Tongue of Fire and Your Vice is a Locked Room and Only I Have the Key. Pistilli died by suicide in 1996 at age 66.

== Biography ==
Pistilli was born in Grosseto, and studied acting at Milan's Piccolo Teatro, graduating in 1955. Although he went into acting in films, he never completely severed his ties with the theater and often returned to appear in plays directed by Giorgio Strehler.

He appeared in many Spaghetti Westerns such as The Good, the Bad and the Ugly (1966) (as the priest Pablo Ramírez, brother of Eli Wallach's character Tuco) and in For a Few Dollars More (1965) as the cunning second-in-command Groggy (his first credited film role). He played the murderous Albert in the Mario Bava giallo Twitch of the Death Nerve (A Bay of Blood) in 1971. He had a regular role on the popular Italian television Mafia drama La piovra (The Octopus). He also appeared as the main villain in Death Rides a Horse (1967).

After a role in the 1970 Charles Bronson thriller Cold Sweat, in 1972 he appeared in two giallo films Iguana With the Tongue of Fire and Your Vice Is a Locked Room and Only I Have the Key (playing an alcoholic), and appeared as an exorcising priest in the 1974 cult horror film The Eerie Midnight Horror Show (aka The Sexorcist).

== Death ==
Pistilli committed suicide in his home in Milan just before he was scheduled to appear in the final performance of Terence Rattigan's Tosca on 21 April 1996. The program was panned by critics and audiences, and that might have contributed to Pistilli's state of mind. However, according to his suicide note, Pistilli had suffered deep despair after making bitter public comments regarding the recent end of a four-year off-stage relationship with singer/actress Milva. In his note he apologized to her for the spiteful statements released in the published interview.

== Selected filmography ==
- Walter e i suoi cugini (1961) – Man discussing with Tavolini (uncredited)
- For a Few Dollars More (1965) – Groggy (Indio's Gang)
- One Hundred Thousand Dollars for Lassiter (1966) – Danny
- Texas, Adios (1966) – Hernandez
- The Good, the Bad and the Ugly (1966) – Father Pablo Ramírez
- We Still Kill the Old Way (1967) – Arturo Manno
- Death Rides a Horse (1967) – Walcott
- La lunga sfida (1967) – Paynes
- The Sweet Body of Deborah (1968) – Philip (starring Carroll Baker)
- Bandits in Rome (1969) – Colangeli
- The Great Silence (1968) – Henry Pollicut
- The Libertine (1968) – Otto Frank, aka Mr. X
- The Protagonists (1968) – Tassoni
- The Bandit (1969)
- The Lady of Monza (1969) – Count Fuentes
- Machine Gun McCain (1969) – Duke Mazzanga
- Eagles Over London (1969) – Major Krueger
- Night of the Serpent (1969) – Lieutenant 'The Snake' Hernandez
- Dead of Summer (1970) – Doctor Volterra
- Cold Sweat (1970) – Fausto Gelardi (starring Charles Bronson)
- Veruschka – poesia di una donna (1971) – Luigi the manager
- Twitch of the Death Nerve (1971) aka A Bay of Blood – Albert
- The Case of the Scorpion's Tail (1971) – Inspector Stavros
- The Iguana with the Tongue of Fire (1971) – Detective John Norton
- Summer Affair (1971) – Lo Versi
- Caliber 9 (1972) – Mercuri
- Your Vice Is a Locked Room and Only I Have the Key (1972) – Oliviero
- A White Dress for Marialé (1972) – Paolo
- Tragic Ceremony at Villa Alexander (1972) – Lord Alexander
- Il gatto di Brooklyn aspirante detective (1973) – Tony Mangialafoglia
- The Black Hand (The Birth of the Mafia) (1973) – Don Nunzio Pantaleo
- Number One (1973) – Carabinieri commander
- One Way (1973) – Javier
- Silence the Witness (1974) – Inspector De Luca
- The Eerie Midnight Horror Show (1974) aka The Sexorcist – Father Xeno
- The Suspects (1974) – Marcello Angiotti
- The Killers Are Our Guests (1974) – Commissario Di Stefano
- Cagliostro (1975) – Cardinal de Rohan
- Due Magnum .38 per una città di carogne (1975) – Commissario Perri
- Sins Without Intentions (1975) – Stefania's Stepfather
- MitGift (1976) – Commissario
- La principessa nuda (1976) – Marco
- Illustrious Corpses (1976) – Cusan
- Confessions of a Frustrated Housewife (1976) – Doctor Carlo
- Antonio Gramsci: The Days of Prison (1977) – Gennaro Gramsci
- Mamma Ebe (1985) – Roberto Lavagnino
- Una casa in bilico (1986)
- Mal d'Africa (1990)
- L'amante senza volto (1993) – Athos Magnani
