= Your Vice Is a Locked Room and Only I Have the Key =

1972 film by Sergio Martino

- Theatrical release poster
- Italian: Il tuo vizio è una stanza chiusa e solo io ne ho la chiave
- Directed by: Sergio Martino
- Screenplay by: Ernesto Gastaldi; Adriano Bolzoni; Sauro Scavolini
- Story by: Luciano Martino; Sauro Scavolini
- Based on: "The Black Cat" by Edgar Allan Poe
- Produced by: Luciano Martino
- Starring: Edwige Fenech; Anita Strindberg; Luigi Pistilli; Ivan Rassimov; Franco Nebbia; Riccardo Salvino
- Cinematography: Giancarlo Ferrando
- Edited by: Attilio Vincioni
- Music by: Bruno Nicolai
- Production company: Lea Film
- Distributed by: Titanus
- Release date: 4 August 1972
- Running time: 96 minutes
- Country: Italy
- Language: Italian

Your Vice Is a Locked Room and Only I Have the Key (Italian: Il tuo vizio è una stanza chiusa e solo io ne ho la chiave) is a 1972 Italian giallo film directed by Sergio Martino and starring Edwige Fenech, Luigi Pistilli, and Anita Strindberg. The film revolves around a depraved writer and his mistreated wife, whose fragile relationship is further complicated by local murders and the arrival of the writer's beautiful niece.

The film was Martino's fourth giallo and loosely adapts elements from Edgar Allan Poe's 1843 short story "The Black Cat". Its title derives from Martino's earlier The Strange Vice of Mrs. Wardh (1971), in which the titular character (played by Fenech) receives a note containing a similar phrase. The film has been released under several alternative titles, including Gently Before She Dies, Eye of the Black Cat, and Excite Me.

== Plot ==
Oliviero Rouvigny, a washed-up, alcoholic writer, lives in an old villa in Teolo, where he abuses his wife Irina and their maid Brenda and hosts debauched parties for local hippies. Irina lives in fear of her husband and his black cat Satan, who belonged to Oliviero's late mother Esther, a former actress. Oliviero is protective of the cat and his mother's special dress that she wore to portray Mary Stuart.

After his mistress Fausta is found murdered, Oliviero is questioned by Inspector Farla after being identified by Fausta's boss Bartoli. Oliviero claims that he was at home, and Irina reluctantly supports his false alibi. That night, Brenda puts on Esther's dress, unknowingly watched by a drunk Oliviero. Brenda is attacked by someone with a billhook and dies as Irina discovers her. Fearful after being suspected for Fausta's death, Oliviero walls up Brenda's body in the cellar and orders Irina to discreetly clean his mother's gown.

Oliviero's niece Floriana announces a surprise visit, and the Rouvignys fetch her at the train station the next day, unknowingly watched by a mysterious gray-haired man. That night, the gray-haired man delivers Esther's dry-cleaned gown to Irina, whose indiscretion enrages Oliviero, prompting him to lock Irina in a closet to be clawed by Satan. Floriana teases her uncle Oliviero for his attraction to her and alludes to a rumor that he had an incestuous affair with his mother Esther. She later finds Irina in the closet and frees her. Irina confides in Floriana about Oliviero's abuse and cover-up, and the two have sex.

The killer murders prostitute Giovanna, whose madam kills the attacker, revealed to be Bartoli, who escaped a psychiatric hospital and faked a new identity. Floriana begins dating motorbike racer Dario, who is also the Rouvignys' milkman. After being forced to drop out of a race, Dario has sex with Floriana in an abandoned loft, where Oliviero spies on them. At the villa, local junk dealer Mrs. Molinar witnesses Irina stabbing one of Satan's eyes out with scissors after he kills several of Irina's pet doves.

That night, Oliviero discovers Floriana in his mother's gown. Floriana reveals she knew that he witnessed her and Dario's tryst, before she seduces her uncle and the two have sex. Floriana later informs an unsurprised Irina about the encounter and Oliviero's burgeoning desire to murder Irina, then implies that Irina should preemptively kill Oliviero and make it look like an accident. Irina eavesdrops on Floriana and Oliviero's pillow talk and overhears Oliviero's plot to murder Irina and hide her body in the cellar. Oliviero finds and beats her. Dario secretly invites Floriana to meet him in the morning to watch him race for a lucrative contract. Irina chases Satan into the cellar, where she discovers that Brenda's corpse has been uncovered, convincing her that Oliviero is serious about his plan to murder her.

Irina eventually kills Oliviero at his desk with scissors. Floriana reveals that she covets her grandmother Esther's valuable jewelry, which Irina gives her after she helps hide Oliviero's body in the cellar. Irina convinces Floriana to stay for one last night of sex. A figure enters the villa and repeatedly types "vendetta" on Oliviero's typewriter, and a terrified Floriana flees the villa with the jewelry. The figure is revealed to be the gray-haired man, Walter, who is Irina's secret lover and accomplice in her plot to torment and destroy her husband. Irina killed Esther and had Walter kill Brenda to cast police suspicion on Oliviero and cause him to agonize over whether he killed Brenda in a rage and forgot after drinking to blackout.

The next day, Walter creates an oil spill that causes Dario and Floriana to die in a motorcycle accident. He retrieves Esther's jewelry and returns it to Irina, who pushes him off a cliff to his death. Irina returns to the villa, where she is approached by Inspector Farla and a police officer, who are investigating Mrs. Molinar's report that Irina maimed Satan. They hear Satan's meowing in the villa and trace the sounds to the cellar, where they discover Satan walled off beside Oliviero's body, to Irina's horror.

== Cast ==
- Edwige Fenech as Floriana
- Anita Strindberg as Irina Rouvigny
- Luigi Pistilli as Oliviero Rouvigny
- Ivan Rassimov as Walter
- Angela La Vorgna as Brenda
- Enrica Bonaccorti as Giovanna
- Daniela Giordano as Fausta
- Ermelinda De Felice as madam
- Marco Mariani as Bartoli
- Nerina Montagnani as Molinar
- Carla Mancini
- Bruno Boschetti as Vittorio
- Franco Nebbia as Inspector Farla
- Riccardo Salvino as Dario
- Dalila Di Lazzaro as stripper (uncredited)

== Reception ==
On review aggregator website Rotten Tomatoes, the film holds an approval rating of 100% based on 10 reviews, with an average rating of 7.0/10.
