= Sergio Martino =

Italian film director and producer

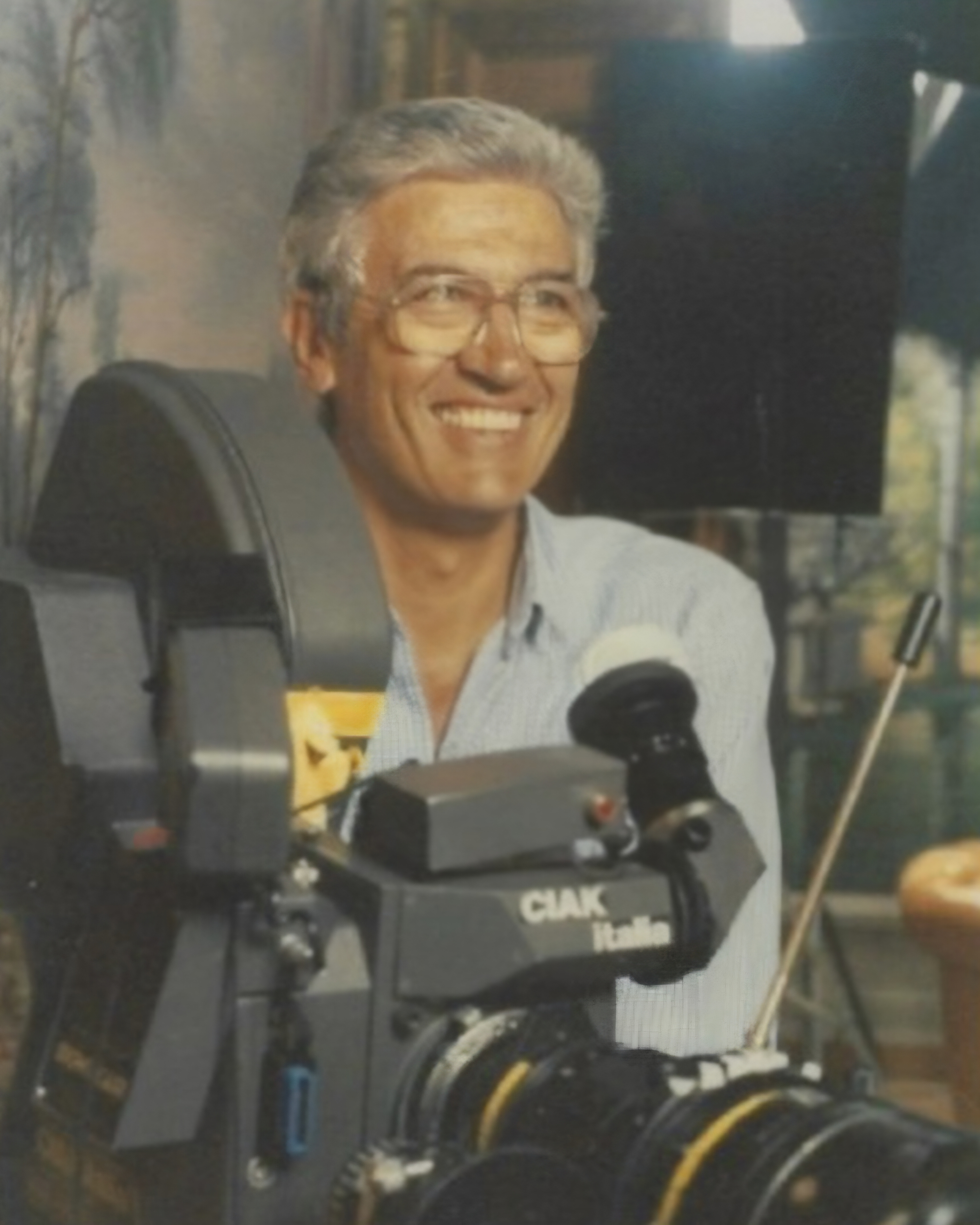
- Sergio Martino
- Born: 19 July 1938 (age 88); Rome, Italy
- Occupations: Producer, film director, writer
- Relatives: Luciano Martino (brother); Gennaro Righelli (grandfather); Maria Jacobini (grandmother)

Signature
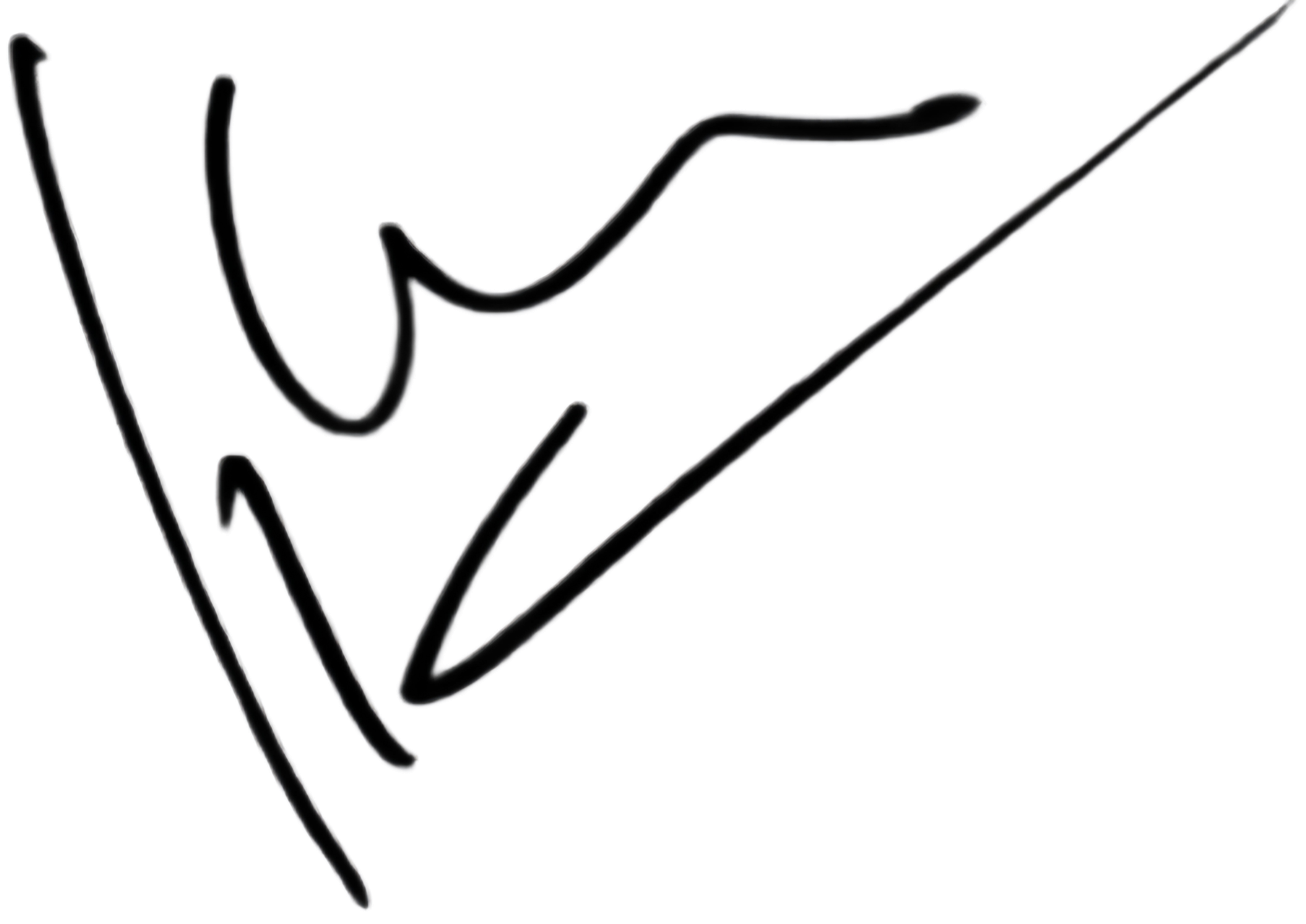

Sergio Martino (born 19 July 1938) is an Italian film and television director, screenwriter, and producer. He is best known for his contributions to the giallo genre.

== Early life ==
Martino was born in Rome in 1938. He was the grandson of director Gennaro Righelli, and the younger brother of producer Luciano Martino, whom he frequently collaborated with.

== Career ==
Martino began his career working for his brother. He was an assistant director to Brunello Rondi (on The Demon) and Mario Bava (on The Whip and the Body). His directorial debut was the 1969 mondo film Mille peccati... nessuna virtù.

Beginning with 1971's The Strange Vice of Mrs. Wardh, Martino was a major figure in the giallo genre. He became frequent collaborators with its star Edwige Fenech, who throughout the 1970s was married to his brother Luciano. After the decline of gialli, he directed her in several commedia sexy all'italiana films.

He also worked with many genre actors such as George Hilton (who was married to Sergio's cousin), Anita Strindberg, Ivan Rassimov and Claudio Cassinelli, as well as famed Italian screenwriter Ernesto Gastaldi.

In 1984, Martino directed the football comedy L'allenatore nel pallone, which has gained a large cult following in Italy. He directed the sequel in 2008.

Martino's pseudonyms include Julian Barry, Martin Dolman, Serge Martin, Christian Plummer, and George Raminto.

== Selected filmography ==
Note: The films listed as N/A are not necessarily chronological.

| Title | Year | Credited as | | | Notes | Ref(s) |
| Title | Year | Director | Screenwriter | Other | Notes | Ref(s) |
|---|---|---|---|---|---|---|
| The Whip and the Body | 1963 | | | Yes | 2nd assistant director. (uncredited) | |
| Hercules Against Rome | 1964 | | | Yes | Assistant director | |
| Vengeance Is Mine | —N/a | | | Yes | Screen story author | |
| Seven Pistols for a Massacre | —N/a | | | Yes | Cinematographer | |
| Mille peccati... nessuna virtù | —N/a | Yes | | | | |
| So Sweet... So Perverse | 1969 | | | Yes | Executive producer | |
| America così nuda, così violenta | —N/a | Yes | | | | |
| Arizona Colt Returns | 1970 | Yes | | | | |
| The Strange Vice of Mrs. Wardh | —N/a | Yes | | | | |
| The Case of the Scorpion's Tail | —N/a | Yes | | | | |
| I segreti delle città più nude del mondo | —N/a | | | Yes | Screen story writer | |
| Your Vice Is a Locked Room and Only I Have the Key | —N/a | Yes | | | | |
| All the Colors of the Dark | 1972 | Yes | | | | |
| Torso | 1973 | Yes | Yes | Yes | Screen story writer | |
| Giovannona Long-Thigh | —N/a | Yes | | | | |
| The Violent Professionals | 1973 | Yes | | | | |
| La bellissima estate | —N/a | Yes | Yes | Yes | Screen story writer | |
| High School Girl | 1974 | Yes | Yes | Yes | Screen story writer | |
| Gambling City | 1975 | Yes | Yes | | | |
| Silent Action | 1975 | Yes | Yes | | | |
| The Suspicious Death of a Minor | 1975 | Yes | | | | |
| Sex with a Smile | —N/a | Yes | Yes | | | |
| Sex with a Smile II | —N/a | Yes | Yes | | | |
| Mannaja | 1977 | Yes | Yes | Yes | Screen story writer | |
| Slave of the Cannibal God | 1978 | Yes | Yes | Yes | Screen story writer | |
| The Great Alligator River | —N/a | Yes | Yes | Yes | Screen story writer | |
| Island of the Fishmen | 1979 | Yes | Yes | Yes | Screen story writer | |
| Saturday, Sunday and Friday | 1979 | Yes | | | | |
| The Scorpion with Two Tails | 1982 | Yes | | | | |
| La moglie in vacanza... l'amante in città | —N/a | Yes | Yes | Yes | Screen story writer | |
| Sugar, Honey and Pepper | —N/a | Yes | | | | |
| Cornetti alla crema | —N/a | Yes | Yes | | | |
| Spaghetti a mezzanotte | —N/a | Yes | Yes | | | |
| Don't Play with Tigers | —N/a | Yes | Yes | Yes | Screen story writer, music composer | |
| Acapulco, prima spiaggia... a sinistra | —N/a | Yes | | Yes | Screen story writer | |
| 2019, After the Fall of New York | —N/a | Yes | Yes | Yes | Screen story writer | |
| Occhio, malocchio, prezzemolo e finocchio | —N/a | Yes | Yes | Yes | Screen story writer | |
| L'allenatore nel pallone | —N/a | Yes | Yes | Yes | Screen story writer, actor (se stesso) | |
| Se tutto va bene siamo rovinati | —N/a | Yes | Yes | | | |
| Monster Shark | —N/a | | | Yes | Screen story writer | |
| Mezzo destro, mezzo sinistro... 2 calciatori senza pallone | —N/a | Yes | Yes | Yes | Screen story writer | |
| Vendetta dal futuro | —N/a | Yes | Yes | Yes | Screen story writer | |
| The Opponent | —N/a | Yes | Yes | Yes | Screen story writer | |
| American Rickshaw | —N/a | Yes | | Yes | Screen story writer | |
| Casablanca Express | —N/a | Yes | Yes | | | |
| Beyond the Kilimanjaro, Across the River of Blood | —N/a | Yes | | Yes | Screen story writer | |
| After The Condor | —N/a | Yes | | Yes | Screen story writer | |
| Un orso chiamato Arturo | —N/a | Yes | | Yes | Screen story writer | |
| Spiando Marina | —N/a | Yes | | | | |
| Graffiante desiderio | —N/a | Yes | Yes | Yes | Screen story writer | |
| Gratta e vinci | —N/a | | Yes | Yes | Screen story writer | |
| L'allenatore nel pallone 2 | —N/a | Yes | Yes | Yes | Screen story writer | |
| Napoletans | —N/a | | Yes | | | |
