= Madame Bovary (1969 film) =

1969 film by Hans Schott-Schöbinger

- Directed by: Hans Schott-Schöbinger
- Written by: Valeria Bonamano; Arnulf Mann
- Based on: Madame Bovary; 1857 novel by Gustave Flaubert
- Produced by: Roger Fritz; Harald A. Hoeller; Luciano Martino; Alfredo Mirabile
- Starring: Edwige Fenech; Gerhard Riedmann; Franco Ressel
- Cinematography: Klaus von Rautenfeld
- Edited by: Enzo Alabiso; Rosemarie Kubera
- Music by: Hans Hammerschmidt
- Production companies: Devon Film; Roger Fritz Filmproduktion; Tritone Cinematografica
- Distributed by: Alpha Film
- Release date: 10 October 1969
- Running time: 91 minutes
- Countries: Italy; West Germany
- Languages: Italian; German

Madame Bovary (Italian: I peccati di Madame Bovary, lit. 'The Sins of Madame Bovary', German: Die nackte Bovary, Play the Game or Leave the Bed) is a 1969 Italian-West German historical erotic drama film directed by Hans Schott-Schöbinger and starring Edwige Fenech, Gerhard Riedmann and Franco Ressel. It is based on Gustave Flaubert's 1857 novel Madame Bovary, although the film cuts out the book's portrayal of her early life and focuses more heavily on her sexual relationships.

== Plot summary ==
In nineteenth century France a provincial doctor's wife harbours ambitions to rise in the world, but finds herself in a compromising situation following a string of love affairs.

== Cast ==
- Edwige Fenech as Emma Bovary
- Gerhard Riedmann as Dr. Charles Bovary
- Franco Ressel as Adolphe Lheureus
- Peter Carsten as Rudolf Boulanger
- Gianni Dei as Leon Dupuis
- Rossana Rovere
- Franco Borelli as Vicomte Gaston Fresnaye
- Patrizia Adiutori as Brigitte, die Nymphe
- Maria Pia Conte as Felicitas
- Edda Ferronao as Anastasia
- Luigi Bonos as Herzog von Artois
- Jimmy Piazza as Justin
- Poldi Waraschitz as Butler
- Manja Golec as Madeleine

== Bibliography ==
- Goble, Alan. The Complete Index to Literary Sources in Film. Walter de Gruyter, 1999.
