= The Eroticist =

1972 film directed by Lucio Fulci

- Italian film poster
- Directed by: Lucio Fulci
- Screenplay by: Lucio Fulci; Sandro Continenza; Ottavio Jemma
- Story by: Lucio Fulci; Sandro Continenza
- Produced by: Edmondo Amati
- Starring: Francis Blanche; Laura Antonelli; Corrado Gaipa; Renzo Palmer; Agostina Belli; José Quaglio; Arturo Dominici; Christian Aligny; Armando Bandini; Claudio Nicastro; Aldo Puglisi; Eva Czemerys; Lando Buzzanca; Lionel Stander; Anita Strindberg
- Cinematography: Sergio D'Offizi
- Edited by: Vincenzo Tomassi
- Music by: Fred Bongusto
- Production companies: New Film Production; Les Productions Jacques Roitfeld
- Distributed by: Fida Cinematografica
- Release dates: February 11, 1972 (Italy); July 30, 1975 (France)
- Running time: 108 minutes
- Countries: Italy; France
- Language: Italian

The Eroticist (Italian: Nonostante le apparenze... e purchè la nazione non lo sappia... all'onorevole piacciono le donne, lit. 'Despite Appearances... and Provided the Nation Doesn't Know... The Senator Likes Women') is a 1972 Italian commedia sexy all'italiana film directed and co-written by Lucio Fulci. It had censorship problems and was banned shortly after its release. Later it was released in a heavily cut version and prohibited for persons under 18 years.

== Plot ==
At an airport, Italian senator Gianni Puppis arrives greets the female president of the Republic of Urania. Puppis, a contender for the Italian presidency, is captured on film groping her bottom as she greets the press. No one notices the incident, and she is unsure of who was responsible.

Photos of the incident reach Father Lucian, a Catholic priest. Lucian arranges a meeting with Puppis and demands blackmail money in exchange for the pictures. Puppis remembers nothing about the incident and refuses to pay. That night, Puppis dreams of a naked woman beckoning him.

Puppis calls Lucian and offers him the money. In return, Lucian offers to arrange a consultation with a psychiatrist. During the session, Puppis describes his recent affliction: his dreams and waking thoughts center around behinds, primarily female ones, despite Puppis being a homosexual. Behinds fill his thoughts and precipitate black-outs, during which he commits acts of bottom-pinching. Puppis vows to maintain his self-control, but later that day his hands wander while standing behind a woman in an elevator at the Senate offices.

The next day, Puppis announces that he is going on a "spiritual retreat" until the results of the elections are announced. Lucian drives Puppis into the countryside, temporarily stopping at a gas station. Puppis experiences a barrage of ladies' bottoms at the station forecourt. Before Lucian can stop him, he lurches over to one woman bent over to examine the car's engine, only to find himself face to face with a furious Scotsman.

Later, Lucian and Puppis arrive at a cloister run by Schirer, a priest and psychiatrist. However, Puppis is drunk after consuming liquor he bought at the rest stop. All of Schirer's nurses turn out to be young nuns. That night, the sleeping Puppis grabs a nurse's bottom.

In Rome, the Vatican secret police learn of Puppis's relationship with Lucian through bugged conversations. Cardinal Maravigili, a clergyman and patron of Puppis, is enraged at the possible scandal upon watching film of the airport incident.

At the cloister, Puppis describes a dream to Schirer while under hypnosis, including visions of the Garden of Eden where foliage bursts with naked female bottoms. The following night, Puppis sleepwalks to Schirer's room and molests him while he is asleep. Protecting his vow of chastity, Schirer wakes up Puppis. Realizing his actions, Puppis professes to feel better, claiming that his dreams liberated his mind. He returns to Rome the following morning. At the cloister, Schirer takes confession from the nuns and discovers that Puppis's rampaging sexual dreams were enacted for real.

Furious, Schirer visits Puppis and demands an explanation, but is forced to hide when Maravigili arrives. Hiding in Puppis's shower, Schirer suffers a fatal heart attack when he thinks Maravigili will walk in. Unaware of Schirer's demise, Puppis leaves with Maravigili to attend a garden party. After experiencing erotic visions, Puppis seduces the French ambassador's wife in the bushes. Meanwhile, Puppis's chauffeur discovers Schirer's body and rushes to tell his boss, only to be abducted by Don Gesualdo, the mafioso leading the Vatican secret police.

Returning home, Puppis is met by Sister Hildergarde, the only one of the cloistered order not to have been ravished by him. Begging him to relieve her of temptation and simultaneously scolding him for wickedness, she implores that they whip each for their sins. As the couple gets down to it, the Vatican thugs arrive. Puppis and Hildergarde flee.

Don Gesualdo and his thugs track down the couple to a motel room and kidnap Hildegarde. Maravigli then appears. Puppis says that he wants out of politics, to no avail, as a lot of time and effort was secretly expended to hoist Puppis into position. Maravigli takes Puppis into the Vatican's bowels to view waxworks of recently canonized saints. They include Carmelino, Lucian and Schirer. The Cardinals threatens to do the same to Puppis. When Senator Torsello dies the next day in a "plane crash," Puppis is declared the winner of the election by default.

At an acceptance ceremony, Puppis genuflects before a wax statue of Hildegarde. As he gives his inaugural address on live television, someone in a bar switches the channel to a game show.

== Cast ==
- Lando Buzzanca as Giacinto 'Gianni' Puppis
- Lionel Stander as Cardinal Maravidi
- Laura Antonelli as Sister Hildegarde
- Renzo Palmer as Father Lucion
- Corrado Gaipa as Don Gesualdo
- Agostina Belli as Sister Brunhilde
- Feodor Chaliapin Jr. as Senator Torsello
- Francis Blanche as Father Schirer
- Eva Czemerys as Fantasy Woman
- José Quaglio as Pietro Fornari
- Arturo Dominici as His Excellency
- Anita Strindberg as French Ambassador's Wife
- Aldo Puglisi as Carmelino

== Release ==
The Eroticsist was first distributed in Italy as Nonostante le apparenze... e purchè la nazione non lo sappia... all'onorevole piacciono le donne on February 11, 1972. It was followed by screenings in Bari starting on April 1, 1972 then later in Rome on May 12, 1972. It was released in France on 30 July 1975.

It was distributed by Fida Cinematograica in Italy and Etoile Distribution in France.

== Reception ==
An Italian contemporary review states that "It is an indecent and stupid farce, that has nothing to do with political satire." and that it "lacks all sense of sharpness in humour, everything being marked with the seal of the most unhealthy and vulgar taste".
