= Winged Devils =

- Film poster by Robert McGinnis
- Directed by: Duccio Tessari
- Written by: Giovanni d'Eramo; Gianni Orlando; Duccio Tessari
- Produced by: Franco Cristaldi
- Starring: Riccardo Salvino; Pino Colizzi; Mico Cundari; Ernesto Colli; Barbara Bouchet
- Cinematography: Stelvio Massi
- Edited by: Mario Morra
- Music by: Ennio Morricone
- Distributed by: United Artists Europa
- Release date: 1972
- Running time: 102 minutes
- Country: Italy
- Language: Italian

Winged Devils (Italian: Forza "G", literally "G" Force) is a 1972 Italian adventure-comedy film directed by Duccio Tessari.

== Cast ==
- Riccardo Salvino: Lt. Gianni Orlando
- Pino Colizzi: Cpt. Bergamini
- Mico Cundari: Lt. Muschin
- Ernesto Colli: Lt. Ernesto Del Prete
- Barbara Bouchet: Karin
- Miranda Campa: Ernesto's Mother
- Anita Strindberg: Gianni's Friend
- Magda Konopka: Gianni's Friend
- Giancarlo Prete : Lt. Pettarin
- Duccio Tessari : De Santis
- Dori Ghezzi
