= The Two Faces of Fear =

1972 film

- Spanish film poster
- Directed by: Tulio Demicheli
- Screenplay by: Pedro Mario Herrero; Mario Di Nardo
- Starring: George Hilton; Anita Strindberg; Luciana Paluzzi; Fernando Rey
- Cinematography: Manuel Rojas
- Edited by: Angel Serrano
- Music by: Franco Micalizzi
- Production companies: B.R.C.; Tecisa
- Release date: 24 March 1972 (Spain)
- Countries: Italy; Spain

The Two Faces of Fear (Italian: I Due Volti della Paura) is a film directed by Tulio Demicheli. The film is an Italian and Spanish co-production between the Rome based company B.R.C. and Tecisa a Madrid based company.

== Cast ==
- George Hilton as Dr. Roberto Carli
- Fernando Rey as Inspector Nardi
- Luciana Paluzzi as Elena Carli
- Anita Strindberg as Dr. Paola Lombardi
- Manuel Zarzo as Félix, Nardi's assistant
- Luis Dávila as Dr. Michele Azzini
- Eduardo Fajardo as Luisi
- Antonio del Real as Dr. Michele Azzini
- Teresa Guayda González as Maria

== Release ==
The Two Faces of Fear was distributed in Spain on 24 March 1972. It grossed a contemporary value of 81,001.29 Euro with admissions of 396,942 in Spain.

== Reception ==
From contemporary reviews, David McGillivray reviewed an 88 minute dubbed version in the Monthly Film Bulletin. McGillivray stated that "Apart from one taut and reasonably well played sequence in which a woman-convinced that her husband is about to murder her on the operating table-pleads for understanding as she succumbs to the anaesthetic, this routine and underdeveloped thriller consists of little more than bits of badly tied wrapping." McGillivray also stated that the film had "expressionless dubbing".
