= Romano Scavolini =

Italian film director

- Born: 18 June 1940 (age 86); Fiume, Italy
- Occupations: Film director, film producer, scriptwriter, cinematographer
- Years active: 1958–present
- Notable work: Nightmare, A White Dress for Marialé

Romano Scavolini (born 18 June 1940) is an Italian film director and the younger brother of screenwriter Sauro Scavolini.

== Career ==
He has been directing since the 1960s. Most of his films are shot independently and with an experimental style. Following his return from Vietnam where he was a freelance photographer, director Romano Scavolini returned to his native Italy where he started his film career again as a genre filmmaker. His best-known horror films are Nightmare (1981), a gruesome horror film that was banned as a video nasty in the UK, and his 1972 A White Dress for Marialé.

== Filmography ==
- The Devastated One (I devastati) – 1958/1959
- Blind Fly (A mosca cieca) (Ricordati di Haron) – 1966
- The Dress Rehearsal (La prova generale) – 1968
- Entonce – 1969
- L'amore breve (Lo stato d'assedio) (also known as State of Siege – Besieged) – 1969
- The long march (La lunga marcia)
- A White Dress for Marialé; aka Un bianco vestito per Marialé (also known as Spirits of Death) – 1972
- Heart (Cuore) – 1973
- Your Honor (Servo suo) – 1973
- The Savage Hunt (also known as Condor's Run) – 1980
- Nightmare (1981 film) (also known as Nightmares in a Damaged Brain or Blood Splash) – 1981
- Dog Tags – 1981 film)
- Ustica: a thorn in the heart (Ustica. Una spina nel cuore) – 2001/2002/2003
- "Che" The Last Hours (Le ultime ore del Che) – 2003
- Apocalisse delle scimmie – A TRILOGY – 2004/2005/2006/2007/2008
- Two Families – 2007
- Two Days – 2012

as interviewed:

- Ban the Sadist Videos! – 2005
- The Diabolikal Super-Kriminal – 2007
