= Anita Strindberg =

Swedish actress

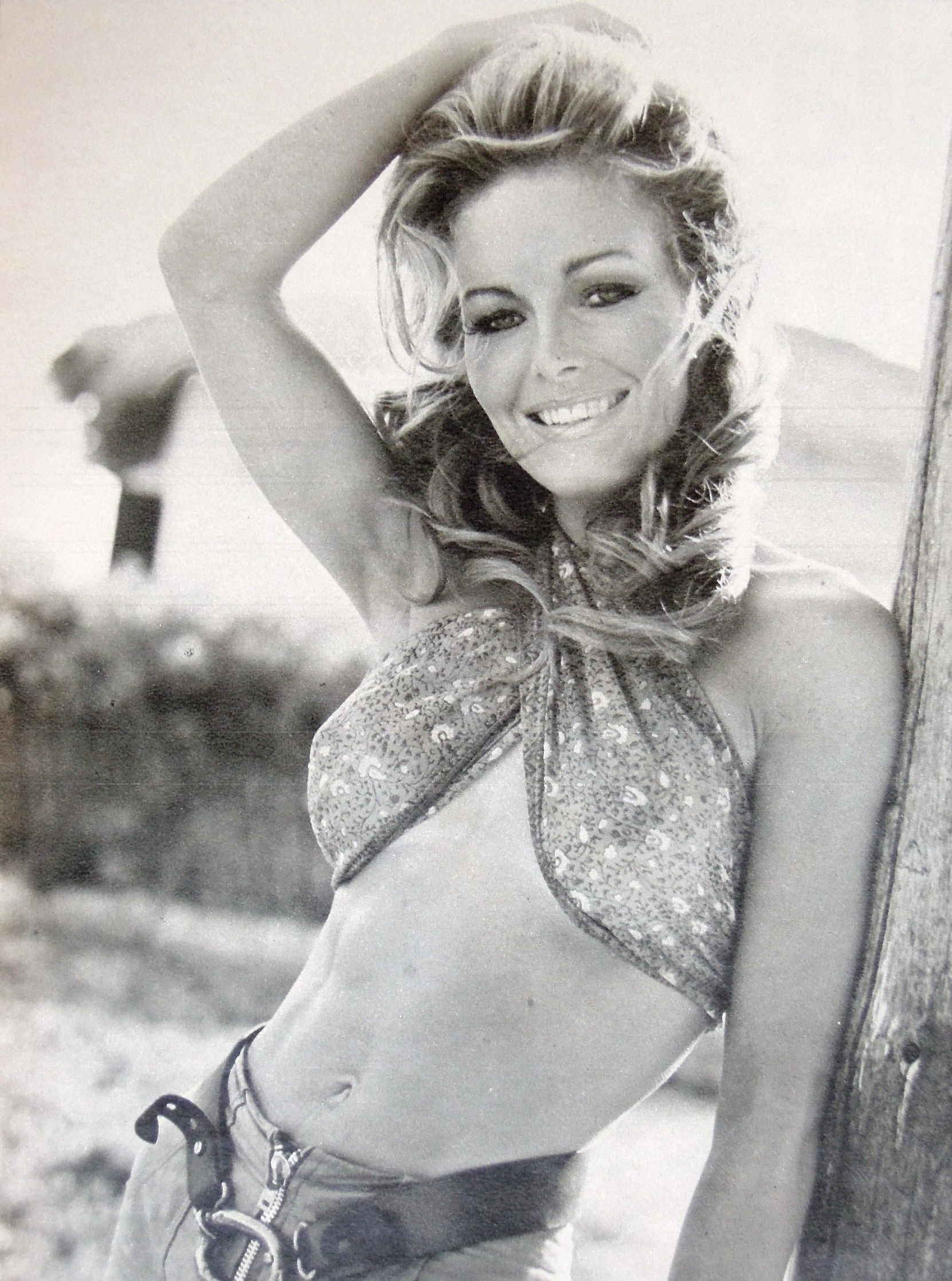
- Born: 19 June 1937 (age 88); Spain
- Occupation: Actress
- Known for: A Lizard in a Woman's Skin

Anita Strindberg (born 19 June 1937) is a Swedish former actress who appeared in numerous Italian giallo films in the 1970s.

Strindberg appeared as Anita Edberg in two Swedish films in the late 1950s. She started her career in gialli with Lucio Fulci's A Lizard in a Woman's Skin in 1971 and starred in her first lead role that same year, in the Sergio Martino-directed The Case of the Scorpion's Tail. In 1972, she starred in three more gialli: Aldo Lado's Who Saw Her Die?, Martino's Your Vice Is a Locked Room and Only I Have the Key and Tropic of Cancer alongside Anthony Steffen.

After the early 1970s, Strindberg acted in many types of genre films: a women in prison film Women in Cell Block 7 (1973); The Antichrist (1974); and the poliziotteschi film Almost Human (1974), directed by Umberto Lenzi. Her last film was Riccardo Freda's Murder Obsession, also known as Fear, co-starring Laura Gemser.

== Filmography ==
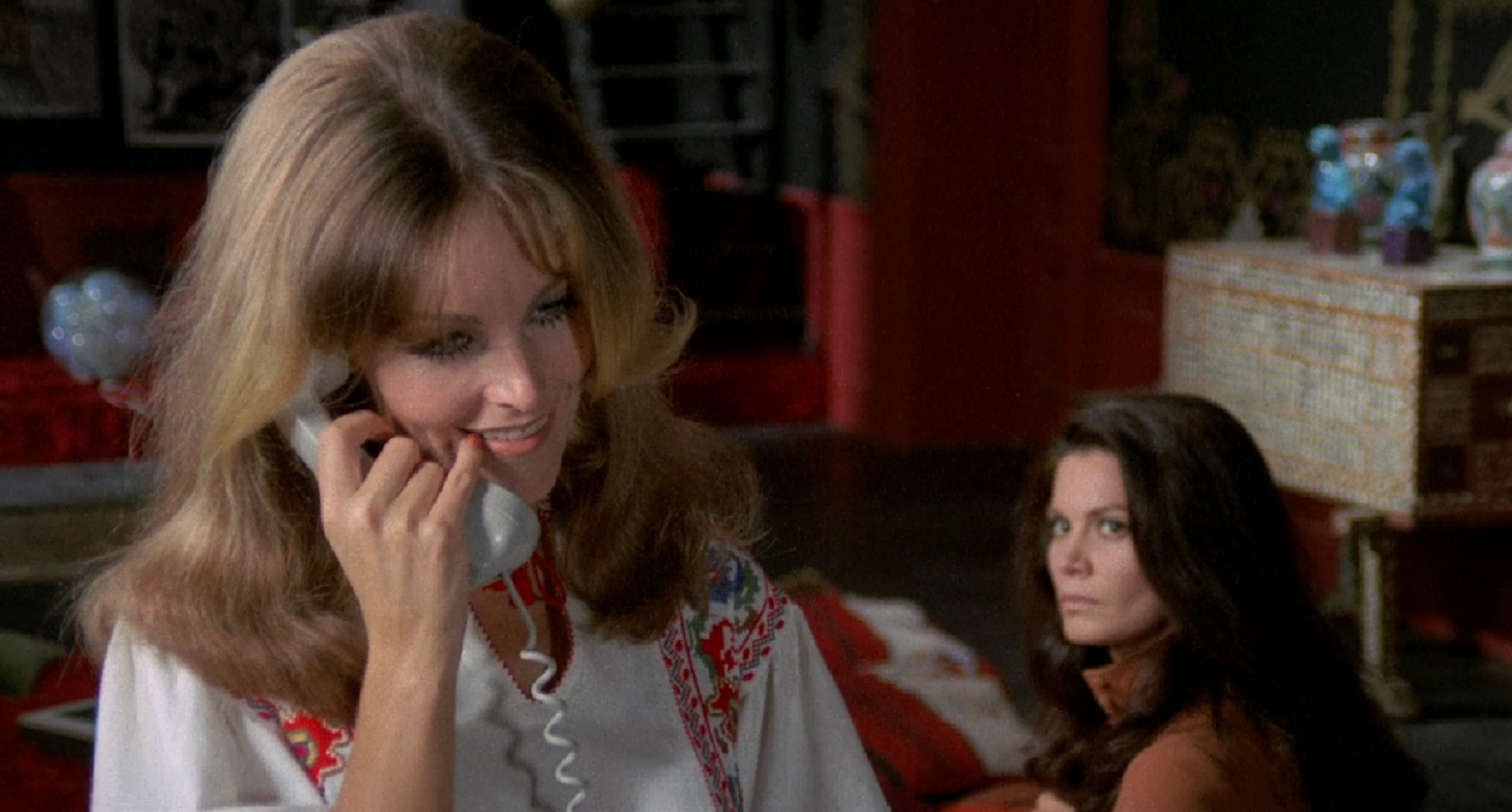
Strindberg and Florinda Bolkan in A Lizard in a Woman's Skin (1971)

- Blonde in Bondage (1957) - Telephone Operator
- Sköna Susanna och gubbarna (1959) - Susanna
- Quella chiara notte d'ottobre (1970) - Victim (uncredited)
- A Lizard in a Woman's Skin (Una lucertola con la pelle di donna, 1971) - Julia Durer
- The Case of the Scorpion's Tail (La coda dello scorpione, 1971) - Cléo Dupont
- The Two Faces of Fear (Coartada en disco rojo, 1972) - Dr. Paola Lombardi
- The Eroticist (1972) - French Ambassador's Wife
- Who Saw Her Die? (Chi l'ha vista morire?, 1972) - Elizabeth Serpieri
- Your Vice Is a Locked Room and Only I Have the Key (Il tuo vizio è una stanza chiusa e solo io ne ho la chiave, 1972) - Irina
- Winged Devils (Forza 'G', 1972) - Cléo Dupont
- Tropic of Cancer (Al tropico del cancro, 1972) - Grace Wright
- Halleluja to Vera Cruz (Partirono preti, tornarono... curati, 1973)
- Women in Cell Block 7 (Diario segreto da un carcere femminile, 1973) - Daughter of Musumeci
- The African Deal (Contratto carnale, 1974) - Eva McDougall
- La profanazione (1974)
- Almost Human (Milano odia: la polizia non può sparare, 1974) - Iona Tucci
- Puzzle (L'uomo senza memoria, 1974) - Mary Caine
- The Antichrist (L'anticristo, 1974) - Greta
- La verginella (1975)
- My Father's Private Secretary (1976) - Ingrid
- L'inconveniente (1976)
- The Salamander (1981) - Princess Faubiani
- Murder Obsession (1981) - Glenda Stanford (final film role)
