= Pilar Velázquez =

Spanish actress (born 1946)

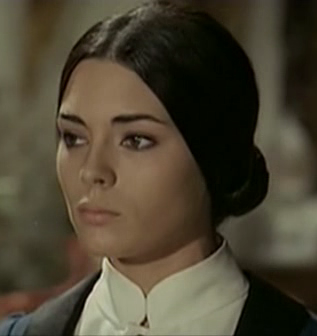
- Velázquez in The Forgotten Pistolero (1969)
- Born: February 13, 1946 (age 79); Madrid
- Occupation: actress

Pilar Velázquez (born 13 February 1946) is a Spanish actress.

Born as María del Pilar Velázquez Llorente in Madrid, she made her debut in 1964 at the Teatro Español, with the drama Caminos de Damasco. Between 1966 and 1977 she starred in about 50 films and television roles; she was active in Italian genre cinema, especially in Spaghetti Westerns. In 1979 Velázquez married the Spanish singer and actor Miguel Gallardo.
