= Le foto proibite di una signora per bene =

- Italian theatrical release poster
- Directed by: Luciano Ercoli
- Screenplay by: Ernesto Gastaldi; Mahnahén Velasco
- Produced by: Alberto Pugliese; Luciano Ercoli
- Starring: Dagmar Lassander; Pier Paolo Capponi; Simon Andreu; Susan Scott
- Cinematography: Alejandro Ulloa
- Edited by: Luciano Ercoli
- Music by: Ennio Morricone
- Production companies: Produzioni Cinematografiche Mediterranee; Trebol Film
- Distributed by: Overseas Film Company
- Release date: November 19, 1970 (Italy)
- Running time: 96 minutes
- Countries: Spain; Italy
- Languages: Italian; English
- Box office: ESP €20,085,120 (Spain)

Le foto proibite di una signora per bene, also known as The Forbidden Photos of a Lady Above Suspicion, is a 1970 giallo film directed by Luciano Ercoli. Written by Ernesto Gastaldi and Mahnahén Velasco, the film stars Pier Paolo Capponi, Simon Andreu and Dagmar Lassander. The film, featuring a score written by Ennio Morricone, has received mixed to positive reviews from critics.

Minou (Lassander) is married to Peter (Pier), a financially-struggling businessman. She becomes the target of a menacing stranger who convinces Minou that her husband has murdered a business partner; unless she submits to a sadistic relationship with the stranger he will expose the husband to the police.

== Plot ==
Minou is married to apparently wealthy businessman Peter. Peter is secretive and frequently absent from home, distracted by financial problems in his business. Minou is becoming disturbed and addicted to alcohol and tranquilizers. One night, Minou is out alone when she is attacked by a strange man, who cuts open her clothes and intimidates her sexually, and tells her that her husband has committed a murder.

Minou refuses to believe this, until she finds out that a man who has made a big loan to Peter's company, has now been found suddenly dead. She receives a telephone call from her attacker, who plays a tape recording that seems to be Peter participating in a murder. The attacker tells Minou that he will go public with this evidence if she does not come to his studio; at the studio she offers him money but he rejects that and demands that she participates with him in sadistic sex. This is captured on a hidden camera, thus giving him new material to continue blackmailing her.

Dominique, a close friend of Minou, initially seems to be trustworthy, but Minou discovers a pornographic photograph of her blackmailer in Dominique's possession. She denies any knowledge of the man, saying she bought the photo in a shop in Copenhagen.

Peter privately contacts a police inspector that he knows, to investigate what has been happening to Minou. When Minou leads the police to the blackmailer's studio, it has been emptied of all belongings; also the photograph has disappeared and Dominique refuses to corroborate that the photograph ever existed. Minou becomes desperate, unable to trust her husband or her best friend, leading to her taking an overdose of tranquilizers.

At the conclusion, the blackmailer comes to Minou's house at night (her husband is absent, as is the servant) with the intention to attack and kill her. In the middle of the attack, Peter comes into the house and shoots the blackmailer dead. Minou is wounded but still alive. Then suddenly the police arrive to arrest Peter – revealing that Peter had arranged a plot to murder his wife and cash in a large insurance policy that he took out for her life. Peter has employed the blackmailer (whom he met by chance on a trip to Copenhagen – hence the photograph) to intimidate his wife and arranged the final attack so that Peter would appear to be an innocent victim and thus claim the life insurance to rescue his business finances.

== Cast ==
- Dagmar Lassander as Minou
- Pier Paolo Capponi as Peter
- Simon Andreu as The Blackmailer
- Osvaldo Genazzani as Commissioner Frank
- Salvador Huguet as George
- Susan Scott as Dominique

== Production ==
Le foto proibite di una signora per bene marks the first collaboration between director Luciano Ercoli and screenwriter Ernesto Gastaldi, who would later work together on 1971's Death Walks on High Heels and 1972's Death Walks at Midnight. The film has been cited as "defin[ing] Ercoli's style", featuring the recurring theme of "the nightmare of being threatened by one's own sexual partner".

Composer Ennio Morricone's bossa nova-influenced score has been compared to the works of Brazilian bossa nova artist Antônio Carlos Jobim. Several of Morricone's compositions for the film feature Edda Dell'Orso on vocals; Morricone and Dell'Orso frequently worked together on his film scores. Bruno Nicolai conducted the score for the film.

== Release ==
Le foto proibite di una signora per bene was released in Italy on November 19, 1970. The film has also been released under the title Forbidden Photos of a Lady Above Suspicion. An English-language DVD release under the title The Forbidden Photos of a Lady Above Suspicion was published by Blue Underground on March 28, 2006.

== Reception ==
The "explicit connection between female sexuality and violence" in Le foto proibite di una signora per bene has been cited as a precursor to "sexually-themed" giallo films such as La ragazza dal pigiama giallo and Tenebrae. Mikel J. Koven, writing in La Dolce Morte also notes that the film also deviates from traditional giallo tropes, highlighting the plot's focus on a blackmail as the central crime makes it more of a suspense thriller than a murder mystery.

AllMovie's Robert Firsching has also described the "vibrant Ennio Morricone score and slick photography by Alejandro Ulloa" as highlights of the film. Writing for DVD Talk, Ian Jane rated the film three-and-a-half stars out of five, praising Morricone's score and complimenting the film's plot and suspense. Jane noted that while the film is "low on nudity and murderous mayhem, it does have some interesting suspense and enough underlying themes of kinky depravity to keep things interesting despite the slow pace at which it plays out". Fellow DVD Talk reviewer Glenn Erickson also rated the film three-and-a-half stars out of five, writing that it "looks and sounds great, with attractive settings and cinematography. But its unconvincing sexual blackmail story isn't engaging, and we keep watching mainly to find out if there are going to be any surprise". Erickson felt that more attention had been paid to "the attractive camerawork and the smartly designed interior sets" than to the script or acting. Dread Central's Jon Condit rated the film one out of five, deriding its "molasses in January, threadbare story". However, Condit felt the film was an example of the "warmth and often gorgeously artistic composition of Italian cinema", although he found the characters "flat" and the film's dénouement disappointing.

== Sources ==
- Adinolfi, Francesco; Pinkus, Karen (2008). Mondo Exotica: Sounds, Visions, Obsessions of the Cocktail Generation. Duke University Press. ISBN 978-0822341567.
- Shipka, Danny (2011). Perverse Titillation: The Exploitation Cinema of Italy, Spain and France, 1960–1980 (illustrated ed.). McFarland & Company. ISBN 978-0786448883.
- Spencer, Kristopher (2008). Film And Television Scores 1950-1979: A Critical Survey by Genre. McFarland & Company. ISBN 978-0786436828.
