= Sonja Jeannine =

Austrian actress

- Born: Sonja Jeannine; 9 May 1956 (age 70); Austria
- Occupation: Actress
- Years active: 1972 - 1986

Sonja Jeannine (May 9, 1956) is a retired Austrian stage and film actress.

== Career ==
Jeannine started her career with the ensemble Löwinger-Bühne and later passed to cinema, especially acting in sex report films directed by Ernst Hofbauer, such as three Schulmädchen-Report films as well as Schlüsselloch-Report (hotel sexuality report) and Frühreifen-Report (adolescent sexuality report). During 1976 and 1977, she was active in Italian exploitation cinema but returned to Viennese theatres with Erich Padalewski by 1978. By the early 1980s, she was performing at Theater in der Josefstadt and during this period, she met entrepreneur Richard Lugner in 1983 with whom she got engaged. Jeannine's last acting performance was in the play Der Schwierige at the Bregenz Festival the same year.

== Personal life ==
Sonja Jeannine left Austria and settled in the USA.

== Selected filmography ==
- The Countess Died of Laughter (1973)
- Virgins of the Seven Seas (1974)
- The Net (1975)
- La figliastra (1976)
- The Black Corsair (1977)
- Mannaja (1977)
- Breakthrough (1979)
