= Virgins of the Seven Seas =

1974 Hong Kong-German film by Ernst Hofbauer and Kuei Chih-hung

- German DVD cover under the title Karate, Küsse, blonde Katzen
- Traditional Chinese: 洋妓
- Hanyu Pinyin: Yáng jì
- Directed by: Kuei Chih-Hung; Ernst Hofbauer
- Written by: Cheng Yi Hsun
- Produced by: Runme Shaw; Wolf C. Hartwig
- Starring: Yueh Hua; Hui-Ling Liu; Sonja Jeannine
- Cinematography: Chi Yu
- Edited by: Chiang Hsing-Lung; Chang Shao-Hsi
- Music by: Wang Fu-Ling
- Production companies: Shaw Brothers; Rapid Film; Constantin Film; Film Ventures International
- Release date: 21 June 1974
- Running time: 91 minutes
- Countries: Hong Kong; West Germany
- Languages: Mandarin; English

Virgins of the Seven Seas (original title: Yang Chi, also known as Enter The 7 Virgins and The Bod Squad) is a 1974 martial arts-comedy film directed by Kuei Chih-Hung and Ernst Hofbauer and starring Yueh Hua and Sonja Jeannine. The film is a Hong Kong-West German co-production. The German version titled Karate, Küsse, blonde Katzen saw theatrical release on 15 August 1974 and was released on DVD in August 2010.

== Theme ==
Virgins of the Seven Seas features a great amount of gratuitous nudity and its title cast is composed of sexploitation film actresses of the period, two of them, Sonja Jeannine and Deborah Ralls, from sex report films of Hofbauer. The German film encyclopaedia Lexikon des internationalen Films describes the film as "Schoolgirls goes Hong Kong: Wild mix of cheap Asian pirate-kung fu films and the German sex posse."

== Plot ==
A ship sailing in the pre-First Opium War South China Sea is attacked by pirates and five British maidens on board are kidnapped. They are sold to a brothel run by Chao (Hsieh Wang), where they start being trained in sexual techniques for the day when they shall be auctioned. However, one of the attendants, Ko Mei-Mei (Hui-Ling Liu) takes pity at the girls' fate and, with her brother Ko Pao (Yueh Hua), begins to secretly instruct the girls in kung fu. Meanwhile, a romantic liaison between Pao and one of the girls, Dawn (Sonja Jeannine) emerges.

== Cast ==
- Yueh Hua – Ko Pao
- Hui-Ling Liu – Ko Mei-Mei
- Sonja Jeannine – Dawn
- Tamara Elliot – Karin
- Diane Drube – Anna
- Deborah Ralls – Celia
- Gillian Bray – Brenda
- Hsieh Wang – Chao
- Helen Ko – Tao Fu

== Home Video ==
The German version titled Karate, Küsse, blonde Katzen was released on DVD by the label Camera Obscura in August 2010 and on limited edition Blu-ray by the label FilmArt on 6 May 2022.
