= Death Carries a Cane =

- Italian theatrical release poster
- Directed by: Maurizio Pradeaux
- Written by: Alfonso Balcázar; Arpad DeRiso; George Martin; Maurizio Pradeaux
- Produced by: Francisco Balcazar; SEFI Cinematografica
- Starring: Robert Hoffmann; Susan Scott; George Martin
- Cinematography: Jaime Deu Casas
- Edited by: Eugenio Alabiso
- Music by: Roberto Pregadio
- Production companies: Balcázar Producciones Cinematográficas; Società Europea Films Internazionali Cinematografica (SEFI)
- Release date: 5 January 1973
- Running time: 91 minutes
- Countries: Italy; Spain
- Language: Italian
- Budget: ESP 11,919,640 (Spain)

Death Carries a Cane (Italian: Passi di danza su una lama di rasoio, lit. 'Dance Steps on the Edge of a Razor'), is a 1973 Italian giallo film directed by Maurizio Pradeaux. It starred Robert Hoffmann, Nieves Navarro and Luciano Rossi. The film was later released on video as The Tormentor, Maniac at Large, The Night of the Rolling Heads and Devil Blade. (Pradeaux went on to direct another giallo, the 1977 Death Steps in the Dark.)

== Plot ==
Kitty (Susan Scott) is vacationing in Italy with her parents to again meet with her boyfriend Alberto (Robert Hoffmann). She tries the coin-operated binoculars and scans the city's buildings, when she sees an attack through a window. A woman is killed in her apartment by being stabbed to death by a killer in a black hat, glasses, and overcoat. She runs out of time for the scope, so she tries again with another coin. She can only catch the house number, a peanut vendor, and a cleaning woman on the street where the killer escapes, but the killer is nowhere to be found.

When Kitty fails to get the attention of an off-duty fire brigade officer, she tells Alberto, and they go to the police. Alberto has a limp from an injury, but he does not specify the details. The investigator is concerned about the lack of details in the case, not fully invested in an investigation. But Kitty and Alberto are visited later by the inspector, who reveals the dead woman's been found.

Kitty is asked to try and recall details, and she remembers the murderer walked with a cane. Alberto is briefly suspected due to his injury, which he lambasts Kitty for despite her only trying to help. The vendor is later stalked to his home by the killer, grabbed through the window by the killer's cane, and his throat is slashed with a straight razor. It is revealed he blackmailed the killer on his identity and was murdered to keep him quiet.

Once Alberto was cleared of suspicion, the inspector confides in him a second woman was killed well before the two recent murders. They're all connected by imprints from the killer's cane at each scene. Alberto is later called by the cleaning lady, who brings him to her apartment and tries to extort him in exchange for information about the killer. Alberto agrees, but the lady is later killed as well. Alberto accompanies a friend and colleague of his, Marco, to an audition of a dancer, Magda, which is managed by Marco's wife Lidia. (Lidia has a twin sister, Silvia.) Magda returns to her hotel room, where the killer is hiding under the bed and proceeds to smother her with a pillow.

In the interest of catching the killer under assumption he's a maniac, Alberto convinces Kitty to pose as a prostitute to catch him in a police sting. She offers a hundred bucks to people who drive up, while in full costume. One gives her the money, and Kitty shows the watching responders he's in possession of a cane. When the cars roll in to stop the driver, the police commissioner gets out and reveals himself. The embarrassment calls off the sting and leaves the commissioner making the investigation turning up its heat.

A woman offers information on the killer, as she saw his face at the scene of one of the murders and has a sense of what his intentions are. She comes to the Arrighi house, and when Lidia asks her to wait, the woman sees a photo and flees in horror from recognizing something in it. The killer creeps into the backseat of her car before driving off, careening her off the road from grabbing her throat with the cane, and slashes her to death.

Kitty and Alberto try to look for other leads, and they realize Magda and the two women first murdered all attended the same dance academy. One of the students offers to try and assist when the owner is of no help. They all agree to look through records during a break-in at night. When they eventually get in, the files reveal a familiar face. Alberto and the student get separated when the killer locks them in a closet. The killer tries to murder Kitty and chases her into a nearby greenhouse. As the killer's about to strike, the inspector arrives and shoots him dead.

A flashlight shining on the killer reveals he's Marco. All three dancers audition for Marco, who found them failures and murdered them in retaliation. The cane was a cover to throw the police off his tracks. Lidia elaborates this to Alberto once the case is closed.

== Cast ==
- Robert Hoffmann as Alberto Morosini
- Nieves Navarro as Kitty (credited as Susan Scott)
- George Martin as Inspector Merughi
- Anuska Borova as Lidia Arrighi / Silvia Arrighi, the twins
- Simón Andreu as Marco
- Salvatore Borgese as Asdrubale Magno
- Luciano Rossi as Richard
- Serafino Profumo
- Anna Liberati
- Salvatore Borgese: Paleto

== Critical reception ==
AllMovie wrote of the film, "a complex plot and stylish visuals don't necessarily combine to instantly produce a good giallo", but that "the film is good for a few chuckles and has a pair of memorable murder sequences."
