= Death Walks at Midnight =

1972 film by Luciano Ercoli

- Theatrical release poster
- Directed by: Luciano Ercoli
- Screenplay by: Ernesto Gastaldi; Mahnahén Velasco
- Dialogue by: Guido Leoni
- Story by: Sergio Corbucci
- Produced by: Alberto Pugliese; Luciano Ercoli
- Starring: Susan Scott; Simón Andreu; Peter Martell; Carlo Gentili; Ivano Staccioli; Fabrizio Moresco; Claudio Pellegrini; Luciano Rossi; Claudie Lange
- Cinematography: Fernando Arribas
- Edited by: Angelo Curi
- Music by: Gianni Ferrio
- Production companies: Cinecompany; C.B. Films
- Distributed by: Cineriz
- Release date: 17 November 1972 (Italy)
- Running time: 103 minutes
- Countries: Italy; Spain
- Language: Italian

Death Walks at Midnight (Italian: La morte accarezza a mezzanotte, Spanish: Muerte acaricia a medianoche) is a 1972 giallo film directed by Luciano Ercoli and written by Ernesto Gastaldi, Guido Leoni, Mahnahén Velasco and Mannuel Velasco. It stars Susan Scott, Simón Andreu, Peter Martell, Claudie Lange and Carlo Gentili.

== Plot ==
Fashion model Valentina agrees to help her journalist boyfriend Gio Baldi research the effects of a new hallucinogen similar to LSD. While under the influence of the drug, Valentina sees a man bludgeon a woman to death with a spiked gauntlet. Baldi publishes a report of her hallucinations; however, Valentina believes what she has seen is real. She begins to realise that the killer is stalking her, although neither Baldi nor the police will believe what she tells them.

== Cast ==
- Susan Scott as Valentina
- Simón Andreu as Gio Baldi
- Peter Martell as Stefano
- Carlo Gentili as Inspector Serino
- Ivano Staccioli as Professor Otto Wuttenberg
- Claudio Pellegrini as Henri Velaq
- Fabrizio Moresco as Pepito
- Alessandro Perrella as Van Driver
- Elio Veller as Pino
- Luciano Rossi as Hans Krutzer
- Raúl Aparici as Juan Hernandez
- Giuliana Rivera as Vanessa
- Anna Recchimuzzi as Nun
- Manuel Muñiz as The Porter (credited as Pajarito)
- Guido Spadea as Policeman
- Franco Moraldi as L'ispettore Capo Toscano
- Giorgio White (credited as Giorgio Penna)
- Giacomo Pergola as Il Pazzo Ballerino
- Roberta Cifarelli as Dolores Jachia
- Danilo Bellucci
- Claudie Lange as Verushka Wuttenberg

== Production ==
Death Walks at Midnight marks the third collaboration between director Luciano Ercoli and screenwriter Ernesto Gastaldi, who had previously worked together on 1971's Death Walks on High Heels and 1970's Le foto proibite di una signora per bene. Ercoli's wife Nieves Navarro, credited here as Susan Scott, featured in several of his other films, often in similar roles as "tough, independent" women. The director's preference for this type of character has been noted as being inspired by fumetti, a form of Italian photonovel often featuring such roles.

== Release ==
The film was released in Italy on 17 November 1972. It was released under that title in English by NoShame Films as part of a box set with Death Walks on High Heels, titled Luciano Ercoli's Death Box Set. It has also been distributed under the title Cry Out in Terror.

== Reception ==
Writing for AllMovie, Robert Firsching gave the film one star out of five, calling it "laughably camp fun". Writing for DVD Talk, Stuart Galbraith described the film as having "an exciting knock-down, drag-out climax". Reviewing the film alongside Death Walks on High Heels, Galbraith felt that Death Walks at Midnight had "a stronger, less-predictable screenplay [and] a bit more visual flair" than its companion film; he ultimately rated both films together three-and-a-half stars out of five. A retrospective of Gastaldi's films by the Italian magazine Nocturno described it as "flow[ing] smoothly and with some good jolts", highlighting Scott's screen presence as the film's main strength. (Note: Original text—"scorre via senza intoppi e con qualche buon sussulto".)
