= Gambling City =

1975 film by Sergio Martino

- Italian film poster
- Italian: La città gioca d'azzardo
- Directed by: Sergio Martino
- Screenplay by: Ernesto Gastaldi; Sergio Martino
- Story by: Ernesto Gastaldi
- Produced by: Luciano Martino
- Starring: Luc Merenda; Dayle Haddon; Enrico Maria Salerno
- Cinematography: Giancarlo Ferrando
- Edited by: Eugenio Alabiso
- Music by: Luciano Michelini
- Production companies: Dania Film; Medusa
- Distributed by: Medusa
- Release date: January 23, 1975 (Italy)
- Running time: 101 minutes
- Country: Italy
- Language: Italian
- Box office: ₤777.334 million

Gambling City (Italian: La città gioca d'azzardo, also released as The Cheaters) is a 1975 Italian poliziottesco heist film directed by Sergio Martino, from a screenplay he co-wrote with Ernesto Gastaldi. It stars Luc Merenda, Enrico Maria Salerno, Dayle Haddon and Corrado Pani.

This was one of several European heist films produced in response to the popular success of American films in the genre like The Sting (1973). Gambling City features many of the genre's standard conventions, including a Byronic hero who acts as a social bandit by practicing confidence tricks, the hero's forbidden love with a socially repressed damsel in distress (who may or may not exhibit facets of the femme fatale) and a morally corrupt dandy as villain and the hero's foil.

== Plot ==
Master poker player and card sharp Luca Altieri enters an illegal gambling parlor in Milan and takes a seat beside several tuxedoed patrons at its high-roller table. In contrast to his slickly attired opponents, Altieri is dressed in a threadbare cardigan and slacks. Noticing the newcomer's obvious lack of means at a table where a single chip is worth 10,000 lira, one player asks Altieri if he has enough money to back his bets. To this Altieri responds, "Win or bust." Altieri initially pretends to be a poker novice. He fumbles his cards and requests a re-deal despite his having four-of-a-kind queens, explaining that he does not trust receiving such a strong hand so early. Within minutes he has fleeced his fellow players, and while waiting to make his exit via elevator, he reveals his scheme to a security guard standing beside him. In response, the security guard tells Altieri the elevator is not an exit at all and escorts him into it. The elevator goes to the casino's basement, where Altieri meets underground gambling kingpin "The President", Corrado and Maria Luisa.

Altieri begins working for "The President". Soon after, however, Altieri enters into a violent competition with The President's hot-tempered, self-entitled son and heir, Corrado, for the hand of Corrado's girlfriend, Maria Luisa.

== Cast ==
- Luc Merenda as Luca Altieri
- Dayle Haddon as Maria Luisa
- Enrico Maria Salerno as "The President"
- Corrado Pani as Corrado
- Lino Troisi as Nino
- Franco Javarone as Lisander
- Carlo Alighiero as Police Inspector
- Piero Palermini as Casino Director
- Salvatore Puntillo as Casino Employee
- Carlo Gaddi as Boss
- Bruno Ariè as Bodyguard
- Tom Felleghy as Surgeon

== Production ==
According to Roberto Curti, Martino's contributions to the scrip were "just nominal". Ernesto Gastaldi stated that he "wrote the script with Enrico Maria Salerno in mind as the boss of a sharp - and not just violent - criminal organization which has succession problem when the son shows he's not cut from the same cloth as his father."

Gastaldi considers the script he wrote to be one of his best efforts, but stated that "I believe the actors were very good on this film, improving upon a story that, although not very original, was rather different from crime films of that era." Gambling City was shot at Dear Studios in Rome and on location in Milan and Nice.

== Release ==
Gambling City was released on January 23, 1975 in Italy where it was distributed by Medusa. The film grossed a total of 777,334,540 Italian lire on its theatrical run.

The film released on Region 0 NTSC DVD by NoShame films in 2005 as part of the "Sergio Martino Collection." The DVD is currently out-of-print.

== Reception ==
Gambling City received little attention in the European or American press at its release, but experienced a revival in interest when now-defunct Italian cult-film company NoShame Films re-released it on DVD in 2005. At the time of its re-release New York Times reviewer Dave Kehr noted the "powerful, rhythmic sense of violence" the film shares with other Martino films. But Kehr's review primarily focused on the film as an early example of Martino's talents. Kehr praised the absolute lack of sentimentality displayed by a director who would go on to make over 50 feature-length films, including spaghetti westerns like A Man Called Blade (1977) and science-fiction fantasies like 2019: After the Fall of New York (1983).

Since the film's release on DVD, however, no other mainstream critics have commented on it, and what attention it has received from the blogosphere has been mostly negative. TwitchFilm.net reviewer "logboy" called it "a fairly odd experience," but qualified his disparagement with, "It has its saving graces in amount substantial enough to make it an interesting experience in many isolated regards." And Gambling City critic Matt Hwang called the film's score "something between the distorted wind-up chime of a broken Jack-in-the-Box and the Merry-go-Round accordion."

== See also ==
- List of Italian films of 1975

== Footnotes ==
=== References ===
- Curti, Roberto (2013). Italian Crime Filmography, 1968-1980. McFarland. ISBN 978-0786469765.
