= Flashman (film) =

- Directed by: Mino Loy
- Screenplay by: Ernesto Gastaldi
- Story by: Ernesto Gastaldi
- Produced by: Mino Loy; Luciano Martino
- Starring: Paolo Gozlino; Claudie Lange; Ivano Staccioli
- Cinematography: Floriano Trenker
- Edited by: Eugenio Alabiso
- Music by: Franco Tamponi
- Production company: Zenith Cinematografica
- Distributed by: Indipendenti Regionali
- Release date: 1967 (Italy)
- Running time: 96 minutes
- Country: Italy

Flashman is a 1967 Italian film directed by Mino Loy and written by Ernesto Gastaldi.

== Cast ==
- Paolo Gozlino as Lord Alex Burman / John Smith / Flashman
- Claudie Lange as Alika
- Ivano Staccioli as Kid
- Jacques Ary as Inspector Baxter
- Micaela Pignatelli as Nevenka
- Anne Marie Williams as Sheila

== Production ==
For the script Ernesto Gastaldi was inspired by H.G. Wells' novella The Invisible Man. Gastaldi noted that the starting point for the film's development was comic books and director Mino Loy's desire to develop a film with special effects involving partially reflecting mirrors. It was directed by Mino Loy, whose real name was Guglielmo Loy Donà. It was his third last film as a director.

Paolo Gozlino acted in the film under the name Paul Stevens. Gozlino was a well-known dancer and choreographer in Italy mostly due to his appears in many television shows.

== Release and reception ==
Flashman was released in Italy in 1967 where it was distributed by Indipendenti Regionali.

In a retrospective film historian Roberto Curti noted that the special effects vary in quality throughout the film, ranging from objects on visible fishing wire and poor miniature work while praising the work on the invisibility effects.

== See also ==
- List of Italian films of 1967
