= Salvatore Puntillo =

Italian actor (1935–2024)

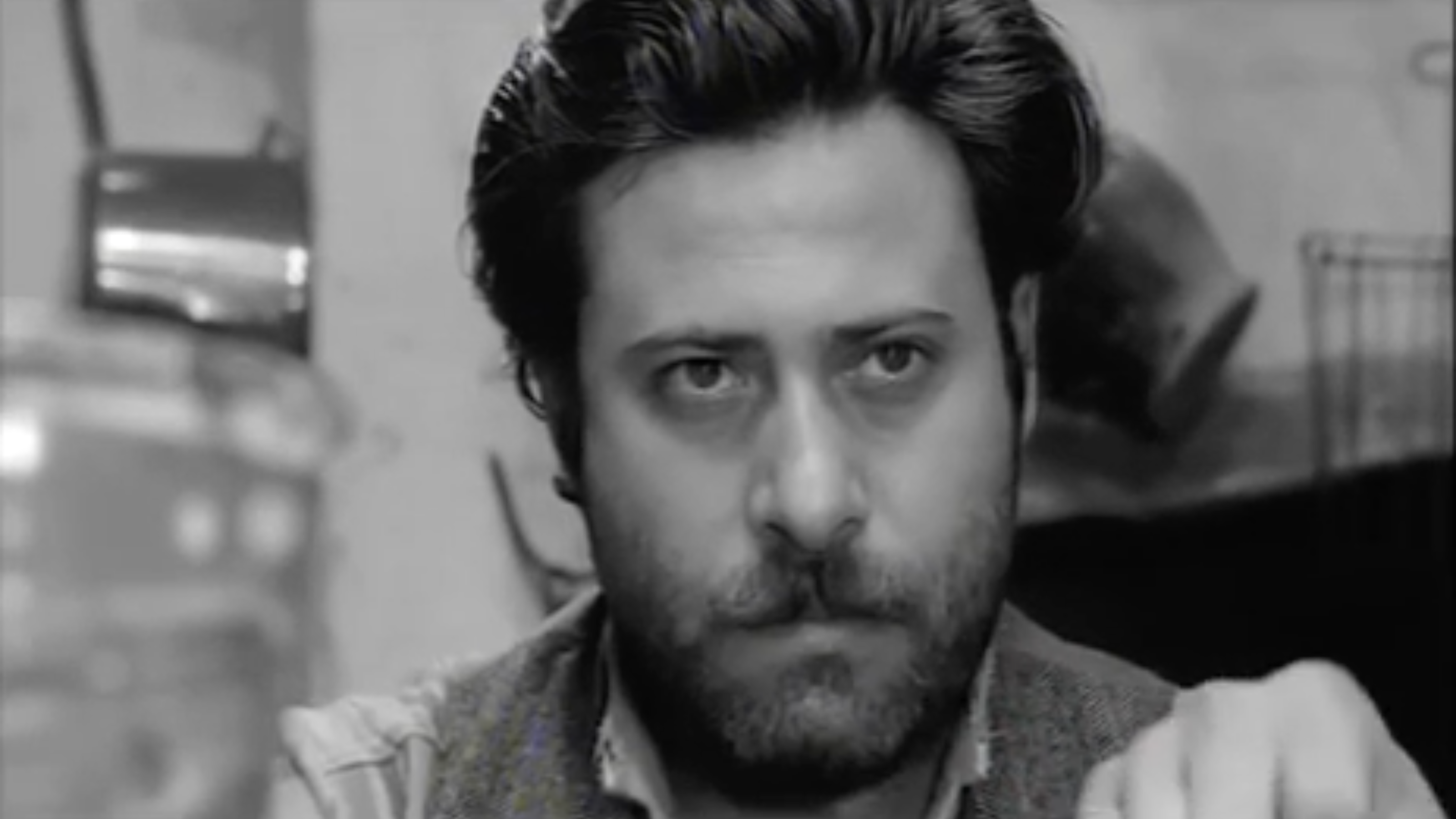
- Puntillo in Io e Dio (1970)
- Born: 27 July 1935; Rende, Italy
- Died: 14 July 2024 (aged 88); Rome, Italy
- Occupation: Actor

Salvatore Puntillo (27 July 1935 – 14 July 2024) was an Italian film, stage and television actor.

== Life and career ==
Born in Rende, in the province of Cosenza, Puntillo left his law studies to enroll at the Accademia Nazionale di Arte Drammatica Silvio D'Amico. A character actor, during his career he alternated auteur films and genre films, being mainly active in the commedia sexy all'italiana sub-genre. On stage, he is best known for the play Francesco e il re, which he performed alongside Nando Gazzolo. He died from a heart attack in Rome, on 14 July 2024, at the age of 88.

== Selected filmography ==
- A Stranger in Town (1967)
- Faustina (1968)
- The Seducers (1969)
- The Hassled Hooker (1972)
- Gang War in Naples (1972)
- The Weapon, the Hour & the Motive (1972)
- Forbidden Decameron (1972)
- House of 1000 Pleasures (1973)
- Il figlioccio del padrino (1973)
- Il figlio della sepolta viva (1974)
- What Have They Done to Your Daughters? (1974)
- Gambling City (1975)
- Deep Red (1975)
- The Sex Machine (1975)
- Four of the Apocalypse (1975)
- Sins in the Country (1976)
- Sex Diary (1976)
- Bloody Payroll (1976)
- Sette note in nero (1977)
- Mannaja (1977)
- Gangbuster (1977)
- Stato interessante (1977)
- Father of the Godfathers (1978)
- The Yes Man (1991)
- Law of Courage (1994)
- Mollo tutto (1995)
- A Cold, Cold Winter (1996)
- Li chiamarono... briganti! (1999)
