= Uno di più all'inferno =

1968 film

- Italian theatrical release poster by Renato Casaro
- Directed by: Giovanni Fago
- Written by: Ernesto Gastaldi; Luciano Martino
- Produced by: Luciano Martino; Vittorio Martino; Leo Cevenini
- Starring: George Hilton
- Cinematography: Antonio Borghesi
- Edited by: Eugenio Alabiso
- Music by: Nico Fidenco
- Distributed by: Variety Distribution
- Release date: August 17, 1968 (Italy)
- Running time: 93 minutes
- Country: Italy
- Language: English

Uno di più all'inferno (internationally released as One More to Hell, Full House for the Devil, and To Hell and Back) is a 1968 Italian Spaghetti Western directed by Giovanni Fago (here credited as Sidney Lean) and starring George Hilton.

== Premise ==
Ended up in jail for love affairs, the adopted son of a pastor escapes, takes part in a robbery, falls in love and avenge his father's death.

== Cast ==
- George Hilton: Johnny King
- Paolo Gozlino: Meredith (credited as Paul Stevens)
- Claudie Lange: Liz
- Gérard Herter: Ernest Ward
- Paul Muller: George Ward
- Carlo Gaddi: Gary
- Pietro Tordi: Pastor Steve

== Release ==
The film was released in Italy on August 17, 1968.
