= NoShame =

- Industry: DVD releases
- Defunct: 2006
- Fate: Out of business
- Headquarters: Italy, United States
- Products: DVD

NoShame, or NoShame Films, was an Italian-American company specializing in releasing authoritative editions of cult Italian movies on DVD.

== History ==
NoShame Films started its office in Italy and opened an office in Los Angeles, California the following year. Its specialty was remastering and releasing cult Italian films on DVD from such subgenres as giallo and poliziotteschi. The company was praised by DVD collectors for the amount of effort that went into its releases, which included thick booklets and plenty of special features.

In 2006 the company quietly went out of business, amid rumors of content/privacy lawsuits initiated by a former Mayfair Model, with its website going offline and all future releases being canceled. Its previously released DVDs also started to go out of print. A new DVD company, MYA Communications, releases many films along the same lines as NoShame and has even slowly started to re-issue some of NoShame's out-of-print films.

== DVD releases ==
- Almost Human
- Uno Bianca
- The Big Alligator River
- Boccaccio '70
- The Case of the Scorpion's Tail
- Colt 38 Special Squad / La Bidonata
- Convoy Busters
- Dark Waters
- Devil in the Flesh
- Double Game / Tony: Another Double Game
- Emergency Squad
- The Emilio Miraglia Killer Queen Box Set (The Night Evelyn Came Out of the Grave / The Red Queen Kills Seven Times)
- Gambling City
- Giovannona Long-Thigh
- Last Days of Mussolini
- The Last Round
- Love and Anger
- Luciano Ercoli's The Death Box Set (Death Walks at Midnight / Death Walks on High Heels)
- A Man Called Magnum
- Massacre in Rome
- The Most Beautiful Wife
- Open Letter to the Evening News
- Padre Pio: Miracle Man
- Partner
- The Railroad Man
- Roma Citta Libera
- Secrets of a Call Girl
- Secret Sex Tape of a Centerfold - Francesca
- The Sensuous Nurse
- St. Francis
- Story of a Cloistered Nun
- Story of a Love Affair
- The Strange Vice of Mrs Wardh
- The Desert of the Tartars
- Ubalda, All Naked and Warm
- The Valerio Zurlini Box Set: The Early Masterpieces
- A Whisper in the Dark
- Yesterday, Today and Tomorrow
- Your Vice Is a Locked Room and Only I Have the Key
