= The Magnificent Dare Devil =

1973 film

- Directed by: Luciano Ercoli
- Written by: Ernesto Gastaldi; Luciano Ercoli
- Starring: Giuliano Gemma; Susan Scott
- Cinematography: Claudio Cirillo
- Edited by: Angelo Curi
- Music by: Giampaolo Chiti
- Release date: 1973
- Country: Italy
- Language: Italian

The Magnificent Dare Devil (Italian: Troppo rischio per un uomo solo, lit. 'Too much risk for one man alone') is a 1973 action-thriller film co-written and directed by Luciano Ercoli and starring Giuliano Gemma.

== Cast ==
- Giuliano Gemma as Rodolfo "Rudy" Patti
- Susan Scott as Mina
- Venantino Venantini as Piero Albertini
- Michael Forest as Brauner
- Stella Carnacina as Eva
- Mario Erpichini as Mitridates
- Glauco Onorato as Grossmann
- Giancarlo Zanetti as Donald
- Carlo Gentili as Inspector Forrest
- Isabelle Marchall as Isabelle
- Christa Linder as Ingrid
- Hansi Linder as Helga
- Nello Pazzafini as Prisoner

== Reception ==
A contemporary La Stampa review called the film "a commercially acceptable mix" between "erotic overtones, violence, echoes of the 007 franchise, and a serviceable giallo plot". L'Unità dismissed it, referring to it as "extremely crude and slapdash", "failing to satisfy even the modest expectations of a regular amusement-park-goer". Paolo Mereghetti also panned the film, describing it as just "uninterrupted Marlboro commercial [...] disguised as a giallo-action film, punctuated by ill-judged comedic digressions".
