= Maurizio Pradeaux =

Italian film director (1931–2022)

Maurizio Pradeaux (16 April 1931 – 1 July 2022) was an Italian film director and screenwriter. He began his career as a production assistant, working with Emimmo Salvi.

Ramon the Mexican, a western, which was released in 1967, was his debut as a film director. He wrote the screenplays for all the films he directed. Many fell into the category known in Italian as giallo ('yellow'), which defines a style of mystery and detective fiction and films.

== Filmography ==
- Death Carries a Cane
- Death Steps in the Dark
- Churchill's Leopards
