= Crossplot (film) =

1969 British film by Alvin Rakoff

- Directed by: Alvin Rakoff
- Written by: Leigh Vance; John Kruse
- Produced by: Robert S. Baker
- Starring: Roger Moore; Claudie Lange; Alexis Kanner
- Cinematography: Brendan J. Stafford
- Edited by: Burt Rule
- Music by: Stanley Black
- Production companies: Television Reporters International; Tribune Productions
- Distributed by: United Artists
- Release date: 25 November 1969
- Running time: 96 minutes
- Country: United Kingdom
- Language: English

Crossplot is a 1969 British neo noir crime film directed by Alvin Rakoff and starring Roger Moore and Claudie Lange (in her largest English-speaking role). It was written by Leigh Vance and John Kruse and is a loose remake of North by Northwest.

== Plot ==
Gary Fenn is a shrewd advertising executive for a London agency, seeking an elusive modeling type to satisfy a difficult client. He finds her in Hungarian Marla Kugash, a peace activist deep in the bohemian society of Swinging London. She is accompanied by a young man, Tarquin, who is extremely protective of her and overtly aggressive to Fenn.

Kugash, an illegal refugee, accompanies Fenn to a photoshoot. She confesses she is in fear of her life, and seems disturbed by the presence of her aunt. When she is nearly killed, the girl drops out of sight and Fenn has to go on the run himself, suspected of a separate murder. He locates her in a country house, the home of Tarquin, an aristocrat in spite of his anti-war sentiments.

Marla's aunt is revealed as part of a shadowy organisation trying to destabilise the existing world order so they can achieve power. They will go to any lengths to silence Fenn and Marla. Their quarries escape to London, where they realise that the conspirators are planning to assassinate a visiting African head of state in Hyde Park. They foil the plot.

== Cast ==
- Roger Moore as Gary Fenn
- Claudie Lange as Marla Kugash
- Martha Hyer as Jo Grinling
- Alexis Kanner as Tarquin
- Derek Francis as Sir Charles Moberley
- Ursula Howells as Maggi Thwaites
- Bernard Lee as Chilmore
- Francis Matthews as Ruddock
- Dudley Sutton as Warren
- Mona Bruce as Myrna
- Veronica Carlson as Dinah
- Michael Culver as Jim
- Gabrielle Drake as Celia
- Tim Preece as Sebastian
- Norman Eshley as Athol
- Michael Robbins as garage attendant
- John Barrard as wedding guest
- David Prowse as best man
- Les Conrad as tugboat captain
- Derek Benfield as man in cafe

== Reception ==
The Monthly Film Bulletin wrote: "A feeble attempt to refurbish the familiar story of the innocent booby frustrating the assassination of a V.I.P. at a state ceremony, already well-used when Hitchcock first filmed it some thirty-five years ago. Indeed, virtually the only room for manoeuvre lies in the final showdown, which coincides here with the occasion of the birthday salute in Hyde Park, with the chief assassin trampled to death beneath the thundering hoofs and limbers of the Royal Horse Artillery. Otherwise it is the old mixture as before, with uninspired direction, a hero singu[l]arly devoid of charm, and a plot nearly incomprehensible in its perfunctoriness. After an interesting start, the film settles down to an apparently determined mediocrity and a bedroom ending of almost incredible archness."

Variety wrote: "Leigh Vance, with added scenes by John Kruse, has written a thriller into which he has dropped a few good jokes, red herrings, a few quick genuine thrills, chases, sex and some mystery. It doesn't jell because the mystery is too cloudy. Motivation of most characters is indecisive and some are badly undeveloped (notably Martha Hyer, Bernard Lee and Alexis Kanner). ... Tighter direction by Alvin Rakoff would have been a plus. ... Moore plays amiably and tosses off some wisecracks brightly enough, but is not wholly convincing as a man of action. Claudie Lange tags along as the model and provides Moore with some provocative teasing. Miss Hyer, thanks to a poorly written part as a TV executive mixed up with the anarchists as a head girl, is a non-event, while Alexis Kanner as a peer on the side of Marchers for Peace gets what he ean out of a shadowy part."
