= Luciano Rossi =

Italian actor (1934–2005)

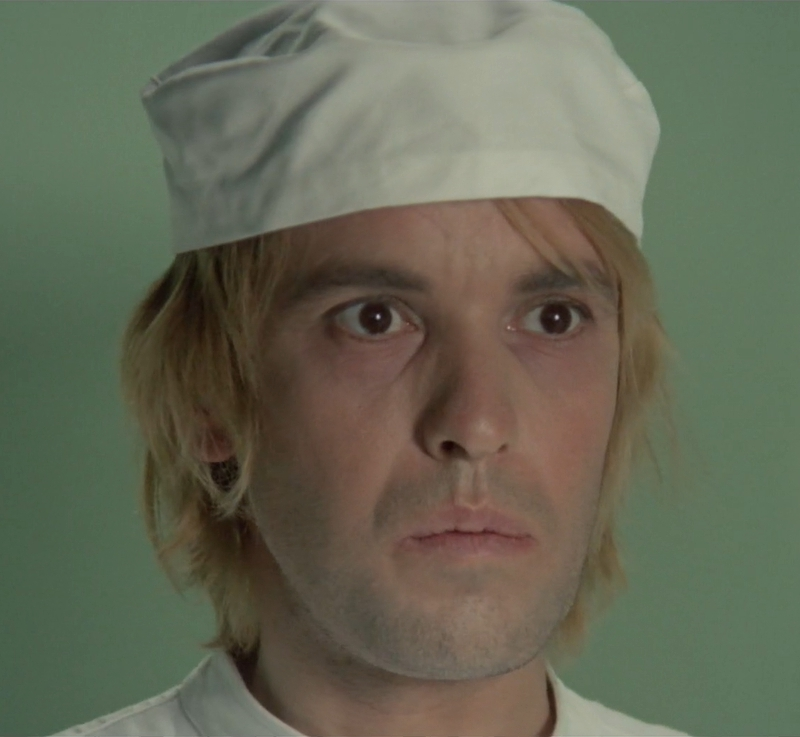
- Rossi in So Sweet, So Dead (1972)
- Born: 28 November 1934; Rome, Kingdom of Italy
- Died: 29 May 2005 (aged 70); Rome, Italy
- Occupation: Actor
- Years active: 1966–1987

Luciano Rossi (28 November 1934 – 29 May 2005) was an Italian film actor. He appeared in 67 films between 1966 and 1987.

Born in Rome, Rossi became first known as a spaghetti western character actor, being sometimes credited Lou Kamante and Edward G. Ross. After the decline of the genre, he specialized in mentally disturbed, schizophrenic or psychopatic characters, being mainly active in poliziotteschi films.

== Partial filmography ==
- Ten Italians for One German (1962) - German Soldier at Fosse Ardeatine (uncredited)
- Django (1966) - Klan Member (uncredited)
- Killer 77, Alive or Dead (1966) - Dr. Krauss (uncredited)
- Ramon il Messicano (1966)
- Uno sceriffo tutto d'oro (1966) - Jack
- LSD Flesh of Devil (1967) - Stanis - Gioglu's man
- Bill il taciturno (1967) - Dr. Thompson
- Date for a Murder (1967) - Massimo Tucci
- Son of Django (1967) - Mack
- The Rover (1967) - Michel
- Halleluja for Django (1967) - Astola
- Death Sentence (1968) - Paco
- Django, Prepare a Coffin (1968) - One of the Hanged
- The Last Chance (1968) - Besive
- Frame Up (1968) - Tippit
- Run, Man, Run (1968) - Jean-Paul
- Five for Hell (1969) - Johnny 'Chicken' White
- Hate Is My God (1969) - Joe
- The Forgotten Pistolero (1969) - Juanito
- Django the Bastard (1969) - Hugh / Jack Murdok
- Boot Hill (1969) - Sam - the Storekeeper
- Chuck Moll (1970) - Fair Poker Player
- The Conformist (1970)
- I Am Sartana, Trade Your Guns for a Coffin (1970) - Flint Fossit
- A Man Called Sledge (1970) - The "Wolf" (uncredited)
- They Call Me Trinity (1970) - Timmy / Timid
- Belle d'amore (1970) - Assassino di una prostituta (uncredited)
- Crepa padrone, crepa tranquillo (1970)
- They Call Me Hallelujah (1971) - Ross, Guy trying Violation (uncredited)
- Return of Sabata (1971) - Circus Man Wearing Glasses (uncredited)
- Death Walks on High Heels (1971) - Hallory
- Two Brothers in Trinity (1972) - Stage Robber
- Watch Out Gringo! Sabata Will Return (1972) - Imprisoned Bandit
- Rivelazioni di un maniaco sessuale al capo della squadra mobile (1972) - Gastone
- Il terrore con gli occhi storti (1972)
- Death Walks at Midnight (1972) - Hans Krutzer
- The Sicilian Connection (1972) - Hans
- Death Carries a Cane (1973) - Richard - Silvia's Boyfriend (uncredited)
- Los Amigos (1973) - Moss
- Hospitals: The White Mafia (1973) - Son of a patient
- Donne e magia con satanasso in compagnia (1973)
- Death Smiles at a Murderer (1973) - Franz, Greta's Brother
- The Violent Professionals (1973) - Cruciani
- The Bloody Hands of the Law (1973)
- Ingrid sulla strada (1973) - The traitor
- Giuda uccide il venerdì (1974)
- Il bacio di una morta (1974) - Friend of Andrea
- Silence the Witness (1974) - Antonio - un teppista
- I figli di Zanna Bianca (1974) - Kidnapper #1
- Una donna per 7 bastardi (1974) - Mute
- Commissariato di notturna (1974) - The Polish Sailor
- Prostituzione (1974) - Faustino
- Heroes in Hell (1974) - Kommandant
- White Fang to the Rescue (1974) - Bailey
- Emanuelle's Revenge (1975) - Card Player (uncredited)
- Violent Rome (1975) - Delivery Man
- Salon Kitty (1976) - Dr. Schwab
- Perché si uccidono (1976)
- Violent Naples (1976) - Quasimodo
- Free Hand for a Tough Cop (1976) - Dealer
- Carioca tigre (1976)
- Le lunghe notti della Gestapo (1977) - Erich Schwab
- Crime Busters (1977) - Geronimo
- I Am Afraid (1977) - The Man with hidden Camera (uncredited)
- Return of the 38 Gang (1977) - Racket boss
- Contraband (1980) - Chemist
- City of the Living Dead (1980) - Policeman in apartment
- Orinoco: Prigioniere del sesso (1980) - Jordan
- The Sword of the Barbarians (1982) - Belem, Village Chief
- Long Live the Lady! (1987) - Monsieur Pig
