= Carlo Ausino =

Italian film director (1938–2020)

- Born: 20 July 1938; Messina, Kingdom of Italy
- Died: 22 November 2020 (aged 82); Turin, Italy
- Occupations: Film Director; Screenwriter

Carlo Ausino (20 July 1938 – 22 November 2020) was an Italian film director and screenwriter.

== Biography ==
Ausino was born in Messina, Sicily in 1938. At the age of one, his family moved to the Piedmont region, to the cities of Druento and Turin. In the 1960s, he began working in the film industry and for RAI. In 1969, he directed his first film, titled L'ora della pietà. Subsequently, his career largely consisted of smaller-budget films. He managed to reach national attention with the films La città dell'ultima paura and Prima che il sole tramonti. Other genres in his repertoire included romantic, erotic, and horror films.

Carlo Ausino died in Turin on 22 November 2020 at the age of 82.

== Filmography ==
=== Director and screenwriter ===
- L'ora della pietà (1969)
- La città dell'ultima paura (1975)
- Prima che il sole tramonti (1976)
- Double Game (1977)
- Tony: Another Double Game (1980)
- La villa delle anime maledette (1982)
- Nebuneff (1988)
- Racconto di natale (1997)
- Una favola moderna (2001)
- Killer's Playlist (2006)

=== Director ===
- Senza scrupoli 2 (1990)
