= Colt 38 Special Squad =

- Italian theatrical release poster
- Directed by: Massimo Dallamano
- Written by: Massimo Dallamano; Franco Bottari; Marco Guglielmi; Ettore Sanzò
- Produced by: Paolo Infascelli
- Starring: Marcel Bozzuffi; Carole André; Ivan Rassimov
- Cinematography: Gábor Pogány
- Edited by: Antonio Siciliano
- Music by: Stelvio Cipriani
- Production companies: European Inc.; P.A.C. - Produzioni Atlas Consorziate
- Distributed by: P.A.C.
- Release date: 24 July 1976 (Italy)
- Running time: 105 minutes
- Country: Italy
- Box office: ₤1.286 billion

Colt 38 Special Squad (Italian: Quelli della Calibro 38) is a 1976 Italian poliziottesco film. This film, by Massimo Dallamano, stars Ivan Rassimov and Marcel Bozzuffi.

== Plot ==
Turin, Italy mid-1970s. When his wife becomes the latest innocent victim of a merciless Marseilles crime lord (Ivan Rassimov), police captain Vanni (Marcel Bozzuffi) goes beyond the law to form a secret squad of rogue cops, each armed with an unlicensed .38 Colt Diamondback revolver. As Vanni and his vigilante crew take back the night bullet by bullet, the Marseillaise joins the game by instigating a wave of violent crime that turns the city into a war zone.

== Cast ==
- Marcel Bozzuffi as Inspector Vanni
- Carole André as Sandra
- Ivan Rassimov as Il Marsigliese / Black Angel
- Riccardo Salvino as Nicola Silvestri
- Fabrizio Capucci as Ciro
- Armando Brancia as Prosecutor
- Grace Jones as The Club Singer

== Production ==
Colt 38 Special Squad was filmed at Cinestudi Dear in Rome and on location in Turin. In March 1976, the bank robbery scene was filmed on Corso Unione Sovietica, across from the Fiat Mirafiori plant in Turin. In April 1976, André told Stampa Sera that a nude scene involving Sandra had been dropped from the final script. The newspaper also reported that a nightclub scene was scheduled to be filmed at a venue on Via Camerana in Turin.

The film would be director Massimo Dallamano's last film as he died on November 4, 1976, in a car accident. He was 59.

== Releases ==
Colt 38 Special Squad was released in Italy on July 24, 1976 where it was distributed by P.A.C. It grossed a total of 1,285,707,500 Italian lira on its theatrical release in Italy. The film's success allowed it an in-name only sequel Return of the 38 Gang.

NoShame films released a DVD in 2006. This version included the Luciano Ercoli film La Bidonata.

== See also ==
- List of Italian films of 1976

== Notes ==
=== References ===
- Curti, Roberto (2013). Italian Crime Filmography, 1968-1980. McFarland. ISBN 978-0786469765.
