= So Sweet, So Dead =

- Directed by: Roberto Bianchi Montero
- Written by: Luigi Angelo
- Produced by: Eugenio Florimonte
- Starring: Farley Granger
- Cinematography: Fausto Rossi
- Edited by: Rolando Salvatori
- Music by: Giorgio Gaslini
- Distributed by: Variety Distribution
- Release date: 1972
- Running time: 88 minutes
- Country: Italy
- Language: Italian

So Sweet, So Dead (Italian: Rivelazioni di un maniaco sessuale al capo della squadra mobile, also known as The Slasher is the Sex Maniac) is a 1972 Italian giallo film directed by Roberto Bianchi Montero, and starring Farley Granger, Sylva Koscina and Silvano Tranquilli.

A separate US version of the film was also released under the title of Penetration (featuring hardcore inserts involving Harry Reems and Kim Pope).

== Plot ==
Inspector Capuana (Farley Granger), a small town investigator who transferred to the big city with his wife Barbara, investigates the murder of a brutally slashed woman, naked in her bed with developed photos scattered around her corpse, showing she was having an affair. The chief insists Capuana dedicate to the case, as he's the best man for the job, even in the heat of scrutiny from the papers consistently criticizing the competence of the police. As the murder is high-profile, the police put a rush on rounding up the usual suspects of gays, transvestites, prostitutes, drug addicts, and vagrants, with no promising results. Professor Casali, Capuana's trusted colleague, provides critical insight and offers a psychological profile of the killer through autopsy work and analysis of the crime's execution. Casali's trusted assistant in the morgue, Gastone, is briefly considered a suspect by Capuani, as he retains naked pictures of the dead women he prepares and is possibly a necrophile, but this worry is soon dispatched.

The killings progress, with more women being slashed at their liaison places, in their homes, one even on a commuter train. They all are found dead with photos of affairs with their lovers scattered at the scenes of the crimes. One husband with physical disabilities dies from a fall down the stairs after his wife's murder because he couldn't find her. The pressure increases on the police, and Capuana and the chief are utterly begrudged by the public backlash and the missing leads they needed to break the case. Barbara consoles Capuana at home, and he openly states he wishes he was back at his home town. A false suspect with mental instability places a call to try and falsely confess to the crimes. When this breaks the news, the killer is furious and anonymously calls Capuana on his office phone. The killer threatens to kill Barbara, revealing she's also cheating and he will slaughter her where she meets her lover.

Capuana is horrified when he thinks back to just who might be the mister, and he realizes a mutual friend of the couple they knew for years is Barbara's lover. Capuana knows the friend's home, but not the killer's home, until he plays the recording of the call back and recognizes the sounds of a grandfather clock, in an office he's been in before. Capuana rushes to the office and finds the film equipment used for the photos at the murder scenes, including proof of Barbara's affair. Going through the desk, Capuana eventually reads newspaper clippings, revealing the motive of the killer is his wife dying in a car accident after she left the country for a meeting with her lover, which broke the killer's heart and turned his grief into rage at women and infidelity.

Capuana reaches the friend's house, where Barbara's already there. The killer arrives just as Capuana peers through the window, attacking Barbara. Too heartbroken and seething with bitterness over Barbara's betrayal, Capuana doesn't save her and watches through the window, allowing the killer to murder his wife. Barbara grabs at and rips the stocking mask over the killer's face to see who he is before expiring, as the killer leaves photos around her too. Capuana enters and stops the killer from running, revealing Casali had always been the murderer. Without provocation, Capuana shoots Casali dead point-blank, then takes a breath and calls the chief from the phone in the house to inform him the case is over.

== Cast ==
- Farley Granger as Inspector Capuana
- Sylva Koscina as Barbara Capuana
- Silvano Tranquilli as Paolo Santangeli
- Annabella Incontrera as Franca Santangeli
- Chris Avram as Professor Casali
- Sandro Pizzochero as Roberto (credited as Sandro Pizzorro)
- Krista Nell as Renata
- Angela Covello as Bettina Santangeli
- Fabrizio Moresco as Piero
- Andrea Scotti as Gianni
- Irene Pollmer as Giannina
- Luciano Rossi as Gastone
- Ivano Staccioli as The Liar
- Nino Foti
- Jessica Dublin as Rossella
- Paul Oxon as Mauro
- Philippe Hersent as The Questor
- Susan Scott as Lilly
- Femi Benussi as Serena
- Bruno Boschetti as Policeman
- Benito Stefanelli as Lilly's Husband
- Luigi Ciavarro
