= Tony: Another Double Game =

- Original Italian Poster Art
- Directed by: Carlo Ausino
- Written by: Carlo Ausino
- Starring: Emanuel Cannarsa
- Cinematography: Carlo Ausino
- Edited by: Eugenio Alabiso
- Music by: Stelvio Cipriani
- Release date: 1980
- Running time: 88 minutes
- Country: Italy
- Language: Italian

Tony: Another Double Game, also known as Tony: The Other Side of Violent Turin (Italian: Tony, l'altra faccia della Torino violenta), is a 1980 poliziotteschi film. This film by Carlo Ausino is a sequel to Double Game.

== Synopsis ==
Sequel in-name alone to Double Game has a good-hearted drifter named Tony (Emanuel Cannarsa) get targeted by a vicious gang when he attempts to stop a kidnapping. He must turn to his friend on the police force Santini (Giuseppe Alotta) and use his wits to stay alive.

== Last Print ==
According to NoShame films (distributor of the DVD) all the original elements for this movie no longer exist. The 35mm print used for the NoShame DVD release is from director Carlo Ausino's private collection and is believed to be the last print in existence.

== Releases ==
Director Carlo Ausino provided his own personal print for NoShame films to release on DVD. Due to the damage to the print NoShame released the film as a bonus on their release for the first film Double Game.
