= Sixteen (1973 film) =

1973 film

- Directed by: Tiziano Longo
- Written by: Piero Amati; Tiziano Longo; Bruno Torregiani
- Starring: Eva Czemerys; Ely Galleani
- Cinematography: Roberto Girometti
- Edited by: Mario Gargiulo
- Music by: Elio Maestosi; Stefano Liberati
- Release date: 1973
- Language: Italian

Sixteen (Italian: Sedicianni, also spelled Sedici anni) is a 1973 commedia sexy all'italiana film co-written and directed by Tiziano Longo and starring Eva Czemerys, Ely Galleani and Giorgio Ardisson.

== Cast ==
- Eva Czemerys as Mara
- Ely Galleani as Francesca
- Giorgio Ardisson as Giorgio
- Anthony Steffen as Sergio
- Danika La Loggia as Sandra
- Carla Giarè as Patrizia

== Production ==
The film was produced by PEG. It was shot between Lake Nemi and Elios studios in Rome.

== Release ==
The film was released in Italian cinemas by Italian International Film on 3 November 1973.

== Reception ==
Corriere della Sera paired the film to Fernando Di Leo's Seduction, but "with an absence of elegance", and "more modest results". Piero Virgentino from La Gazzetta del Mezzogiorno described it as "an adult comic book which is dull and conventional in terms of situations, ridiculous with its banal fotoromanzi–style dialogues, and completely lacking any psychological depth". The film was a box office success, grossing domestically about 825 million lire.
