= Giovanni Fago =

Italian director and screenwriter (born 1933)

Giovanni Fago (born 25 April 1933) is an Italian director and screenwriter.

Born in Rome, Fago began his cinema career in 1959 as assistant director of, among others, Mario Monicelli, Camillo Mastrocinque, Vittorio De Sica, Renato Castellani, Joseph L. Mankiewicz, Lucio Fulci. In 1967 he became a director, consecutively filming three spaghetti westerns, Vengeance Is Mine, Uno di più all'inferno and Viva Cangaceiro. During the 1970s and the 1980s he focused primarily on television works.
