= Double Game =

1977 film by Carlo Ausino

- Original Italian Poster Art
- Directed by: Carlo Ausino
- Screenplay by: Carlo Ausino
- Story by: Carlo Ausino
- Produced by: Ivano Luigino Brizzi
- Cinematography: Carlo Ausino
- Edited by: Eugenio Alabiso
- Music by: Stelvio Cipriani
- Production companies: Lark Cinematografica; Vigor Film
- Distributed by: Lark
- Release date: October 13, 1977 (Italy)
- Running time: 93 minutes
- Country: Italy
- Box office: ₤1.279 billion

Double Game, also known as Violent Turin (in original Italian, Torino violenta), is a 1977 poliziotteschi film. The film is directed by Carlo Ausino and stars George Hilton.

== Plot ==
The fatal stabbing of a wealthy doctor, the rape and strangulation of a seventeen-year-old girl, and a series of destructive smash-and-grabs keep police inspectors Danieli (Emanuel Cannarsa) and Moretti (George Hilton) working overtime. In addition, there is a growing gang war between the established local dons and an invading French crime syndicate that threatens the city. To keep the Turin from becoming the most violent city in Italy, Moretti patrols the streets at night to fight crime as a vigilante.

== Production ==
Double Game was made because director Carlo Ausino was unable to find a distribution deal for his previous film "Prima che il sole tramonti" (1976) and so he asked the producers for advice. Poliziotteschi films about violent cities were popular at the time (Violent Rome, Violent Naples) and the producers were aware that Carlo lived in Turin so they asked him to make a crime film called "Torino violenta" to recoup the lost money. Carlo agreed provided the producers arranged the film's distribution. Needing a star to promote the film the lead role was offered to popular genre actor George Hilton. The rest of the cast and crew were made up of natives of Turin. Turin native Emanuel Cannarsa was cast as Hilton's partner because the director thought that Emanuel looked American and Charles Bronson-like (Emanuel would return to play the lead role in this film's sequel Tony: Another Double Game). When shooting began George Hilton questioned the ability of the crew and director because they were shooting much faster in Turin than crews in Rome. However, Hilton eventually came to accept this.

The production had some difficulties along the way. The first major problem was locating the cars to be used as police cars in the film. The crew had to use cars from a wrecking yard that were unable to go very fast and director Carlo Ausino used camera tricks to make them appear to be going much faster. Ausino also took one of the prop cars home to paint in order to make it look like a police car for the film and the police received an anonymous tip that a suspicious person was painting a car to look like a police car. As there were terrorist incidents in Italy at that time the police visited the director's home to find out what he was doing.

== Releases ==
Double Game was released in Italy on 13 October 1977 where it was distributed by Lark. It grossed 1,279,000,000 billion Italian lira.

It was released in the Netherlands on VHS as Geweld in TURYN. The film was released on Region 1 DVD by NoShame films in 2005, with its rare sequel Tony: Another Double Game as a bonus feature. The DVD subsequently went out of print.

== Reception ==
Corriere della Sera's Giovanna Grassi described the film as racist towards Southern Italians, and characterized by "surreal distortions", "a reactionary cult of authority", and "a latent class hatred".
