= La figliastra =

1976 film by Edoardo Mulargia

- Directed by: Edoardo Mulargia
- Written by: Luigi Angelo; Piero Regnoli; Edoardo Mulargia; Giuseppe Carbone; Anselmo Parinello
- Produced by: Anselmo Parrinello; Paolo Prestano
- Starring: Sonja Jeannine; Lucretia Love
- Cinematography: Maurizio Gennaro
- Edited by: Luciano Anconetani
- Music by: Gianfranco Di Stefano
- Release date: 31 July 1976
- Running time: 88 minutes
- Country: Italy
- Language: Italian

La figliastra: Storia di corna e di passioni is a 1976 commedia sexy all'italiana film directed by Edoardo Mulargia. It features Bruno Scipioni with Austrian sexploitation star Sonja Jeannine (credited as Sonia Jeanine).

In France, the film was released in an adult version with added hardcore scenes and under the title Veuves excitées.

== Plot ==
The wife of the Sicilian barone Francesco 'Cocò' Laganà dies of heart failure while having sex with the lecherous gardener Fefè. Cocò marries a Northerner widow named Nadia, her beautiful teenage daughter Daniela later moving to her stepfather's house. Both Cocò and Fefè (who is now married to Cocò's nymphomaniac sister Agata) make sexual advances to Daniela but to no avail. Meanwhile Cocò's heirship to a large inheritance is in jeopardy because his late wife did not beget him a child and Nadia cannot get pregnant, the Sicilian customary law barring a man without offspring from heirship.

== Cast ==
- Sonja Jeannine as Daniela
- Lucretia Love as Agata
- Bruno Scipioni as Baron Francesco Laganà
- Nino Terzo as Fefè
- Maristella Greco as Nadia
- Beppe Carbone

== Production ==
The film was produced by Austerity film. Initially, Lucio Fulci was announced as the director.
