= Return of the 38 Gang =

- Directed by: Giuseppe Vari
- Written by: Giuseppe Vari; Ettore Sanzo
- Produced by: Pino Buricchi
- Starring: Antonio Sabato
- Cinematography: Cristiano Pogany
- Music by: Lallo Gori
- Release date: 1977
- Language: Italian

Return of the 38 Gang (Italian: Ritornano quelli della calibro 38, also known as Gangsters) is a 1977 Italian poliziottesco film directed by Giuseppe Vari. The film is an in-name-only sequel to Massimo Dallamano's Colt 38 Special Squad with different plot, characters and cast.

== Cast ==
- Antonio Sabato as Marshall Tinto Baragli
- Max Delys as Bruno
- Dagmar Lassander as Rosy
- Giampiero Albertini as Folco Bordoni
- Rik Battaglia as Police Commissioner
- Luciano Rossi as Racket boss
- Daniele Dublino as Lucas
- Luciano Pigozzi as Romolo
- Maurice Poli as Maurice

== See also ==
- List of Italian films of 1977
