= Claudie Lange =

Belgian model and actress

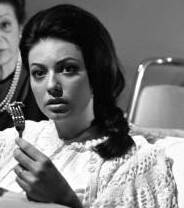
- Claudie Lange in 1965
- Occupation(s): Model, Actress
- Years active: 1960s–1970s

Claudie Lange is a Belgian actress and model, mainly active in Italian cinema.

Lange entered the film industry at 21, when she met Federico Fellini during a vacation in Rome; Fellini gave her a minor part in Juliet of the Spirits (1965), and after that she appeared in The Bible (1966), the Roger Moore spy thriller Crossplot (1969), and in a large number of Italian genre movies, including the cult giallo films Death Walks on High Heels (1971) and Death Walks at Midnight (1972).

== Filmography ==
- The Invincible Brothers Maciste (1964) as Queen Thaliade
- Juliet of the Spirits (1965) (uncredited)
- I complessi (1965) as Erminia (segment "Il Complesso della Schiava nubiana")
- Made in Italy (1965) as Silvio's Mistress (segment "5 'La Famiglia', episode 2")
- James Tont operazione D.U.E. (1966) as Clarissa
- Agente segreto 777 - Invito ad uccidere (1966) as Elsie
- The Bible: In the Beginning... (1966) as Nimrod's Wife
- Gli amori di Angelica (1966)
- Flashman (1967) as Alika
- Vengeance Is Mine (1967) as Anne
- Erotes sti Lesvo (1967)
- È stato bello amarti (1968) as Eleonora
- To Hell and Back (1968) as Liz
- Gatling Gun (1968) as Martha Simpson
- Il mondo di Pirandello (1968, TV) as Margherita Masci
- Crossplot (1969) as Marla Kugash
- Love Me, Baby, Love Me! (1969) as Ghita
- La pelle a scacchi (Il distacco) (1969) as Claudine
- The Divorce (1970) as Sandra
- Mazzabubù... quante corna stanno quaggiù? (1971) as Luisa - Bordiga's wife
- Quickly - Spari e baci a colazione (1971)
- Death Walks on High Heels (1971) as Vanessa Matthews
- My Horse, My Gun, Your Widow (1972) as Deborah Page
- Death Walks at Midnight (1972) as Verushka Wuttenberg
- La punition (1973) as Françoise
