= Viva Cangaceiro =

1970 film

- Directed by: Giovanni Fago
- Written by: Giovanni Fago
- Produced by: Alexandre Adamiu
- Starring: Tomas Milian; Ugo Pagliai
- Cinematography: Alejandro Ulloa
- Edited by: Eugenio Alabiso
- Music by: Riz Ortolani
- Release date: 1970
- Running time: 104 minutes
- Countries: Italy; Spain
- Language: Italian

Viva Cangaceiro (originally titled as O' Cangaçeiro, also known as The Magnificent Bandits) is a Brazilian themed Spaghetti Western-like movie co-produced by Spain and Italy and directed by Giovanni Fago.

== Plot ==
Espedito is the sole survivor of his hometown after it got annihilated by Colonel Minas and his death squad for harbouring an infamous cangaceiro. A hermit consoles him by planting the idea in his mind that he was from now on chosen to fight injustice. Espedito tries to live up to this vision.

== Cast ==
- Tomas Milian: Espedito
- Ugo Pagliai: Vincenzo
- Eduardo Fajardo: Gov. Branco
- Leo Anchóriz: Army Officer
- Howard Ross: Hoffmann
- Claudio Scarchilli

== Reception ==
The movie received mixed reviews and is generally considered a minor variant of the similar movies Tomas Milian has starred in for Sergio Sollima (Face to Face and Run, Man, Run!), Sergio Corbucci (The Mercenary and Compañeros) and Giulio Petroni (Tepepa). Simon Gelton (aka "Scherpschutter") wrote for spaghetti-western.net considered Riz Ortolani's film score unique and praised Alejandro Ulloa's pictures of Bahia. Yet he didn't "recommend the film wholeheartedly" because due to a lack of "emotional depth" Viva Cangaceiro would never "really take off". He stated the plot was occasionally at the brink of being "absurd".

== See also ==
- O Cangaceiro (1953)
