= Nieves Navarro =

Retired Spanish actress and model (b. 1938)

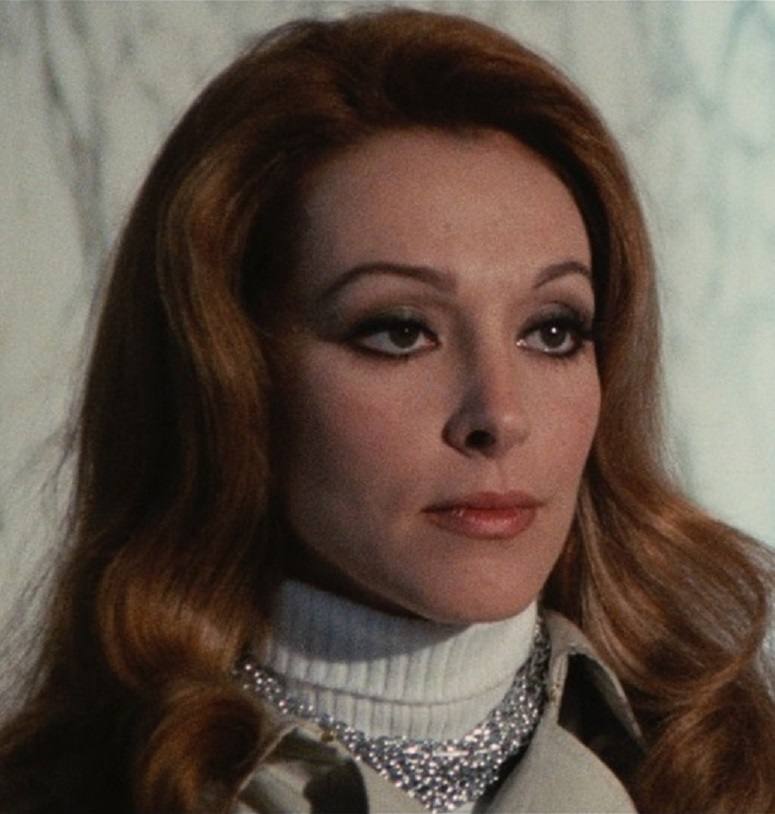
- Navarro in Death Walks on High Heels (1971)
- Born: Nieves Navarro García; 11 November 1938 (age 87); Almería, Andalusia, Spain
- Other names: Susan Scott; Suzanne Scott
- Occupations: Actress; Model
- Years active: 1964–1989
- Spouse: Luciano Ercoli (1972–2015; his death)

Nieves Navarro García (born 11 November 1938) is a retired Spanish actress and fashion model. She worked extensively in Italian cinema appearing alongside actors such as Totò and Lino Banfi in the 1960s and 1970s. She later adopted the Anglicized stage name Susan Scott (or Suzanne Scott) for many of her productions after 1969.

Navarro was also one of the first female stars of the Spaghetti Western genre making her feature film debut in A Pistol for Ringo and its sequel The Return of Ringo along with later appearances in The Big Gundown (1966), Long Days of Vengeance (1967), Light the Fuse... Sartana Is Coming (1970) and Adiós, Sabata (1971). In 1972, she married the Italian director and producer Luciano Ercoli, starring in many of his productions up until the early-1980s, and was familiar with her erotically themed roles in giallo and sex comedies.

She went into semi-retirement after 1983, making two last films in 1989. In recent years, she returned to live in her native Spain with her husband.

== Early life ==
Navarro was born in Almería, to an Andalusian father and a Catalan mother. Her family moved to Barcelona when she was twelve years old.

Her career began as advertising and fashion model. The introduction of television in Spain in 1956 led to further appearances in commercials and other work in the industry during the next few years.

== Acting career ==
She began her career as a film actress in Italy alongside Totò in the Lawrence of Arabia parody Toto of Arabia (1965), a Spanish-Italian co-production, in which she played Doris, a beautiful spy in the service of the British SIS, who charms the Sheik of Kuwait El Ali el Buzur (Fernando Sancho) and allows Totò to use her to drive the one hundred wives of the Sheik jealous.

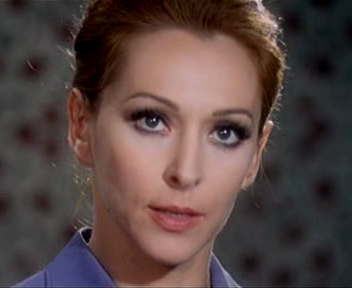
Navarro in All the Colors of the Dark (1972)

Her early work in films took place in the Spaghetti Westerns that were shot regularly in her hometown of Almeria. In 1965, she appeared in A Pistol for Ringo, starring Giuliano Gemma, as the girlfriend of the Mexican bandit Sancho (Fernando Sancho). Navarro also appeared in the sequel The Return of Ringo, and supporting roles in The Big Gundown (1966), Long Days of Vengeance (1967), Light the Fuse... Sartana Is Coming (1970) and Adiós, Sabata (1971). Nieves also had leading roles in a number of action and horror films during this period and was among the protagonists of the film Death Walks At Midnight (1972), directed by Luciano Ercoli, who eventually became her husband.

She subsequently moved to Italy with Ercoli where she spent the rest of her career, starring in many of her husband's projects, which ended veering towards Italian erotica and "giallo" cinema. It was in the erotica genre that highlighted her as a major star especially her appearances in the Emannuelle series, Emanuelle and the Last Cannibals (1977) and Emanuelle e Lolita (1978), directed by Joe D'Amato and Henri Sala respectively.

== Later films and retirement ==
In 1983, Navarro attempted to return to Spanish cinema with films like Gianfranco Angelucci's drama Honey with Fernando Rey, but with less than expected success. She made two last films in 1989, Fiori di zucca and Casa di piacere, before going into retirement. In recent years, she returned to Spain, settling in Barcelona with Ercoli.

== Filmography ==
Year	Title	Role	Notes
1965	Toto of Arabia	Doris	
1965	A Pistol for Ringo	Dolores	
1965	The Return of Ringo	Rosita	
1966	Kiss Kiss...Bang Bang	Alina Shakespeare	
1966	El Rojo	Consuelo	
1966	Che notte, ragazzi!	Consuelo	
1966	The Big Gundown	The Widow	
1967	Long Days of Vengeance	Dolly	
1969	Le Paria	Sylvia	
1969	A Wrong Way to Love	Anna Lanfranchi	
1969	Amor a todo gas	Laura Montes / Falsa Elena	
1969	Siete minutos para morir	Karin Foster	
1969	Naked Violence	Livia Ussaro	
1970	Adiós, Sabata	Kingsville Saloon Dancer	
1970	Le foto proibite di una signora per bene	Dominique	
1970	Light the Fuse... Sartana Is Coming	Belle Manassas	
1971	Death Walks on High Heels	Nicole Rochard	
1972	All the Colors of the Dark	Barbara Harrison	
1972	Kill the Poker Player	Lilly / Kate	
1972	So Sweet, So Dead	Lily	
1972	Death Walks at Midnight	Valentina	
1973	Death Carries a Cane	Kitty	
1973	The Magnificent Dare Devil	Nina	
1974	Il giudice e la minorenne	Laura	
1974	Chi ha rubato il tesoro dello scia?		
1975	The Family Vice	Ines, the Countess	
1975	Los hijos de Scaramouche	Princesa	
1976	There's a Spy in My Bed	Madame	
1976	Smooth Velvet, Raw Silk	Crystal	
1976	Mauricio, mon amour		Uncredited
1976	Noi siam come le lucciole		
1976	Il medico... la studentessa	Luisa	
1977	The Rip-Off	Ornella	
1977	Emanuelle and the Last Cannibals	Maggie McKenzie	
1978	Cugine mie	Aunt Gaia	
1978	Emanuelle e Lolita	Emanuelle	
1979	Candide Lolita	Adrienne Larousse	
1979	The Nurse in the Military Madhouse	Veronica La Russa	
1980	Sex and Black Magic	Helen	
1981	La moglie in bianco... l'amante al pepe	Anna-Maria Mancuso	
1981	Honey	Governess	
1983	El fascista, doña Pura y el follón de la escultura	Pura	
1989	Fiori di zucca	Madre di Enzo	
1989	Casa di piacere		(final film role)
