= Churchill's Leopards =

1970 film

Churchill's Leopards I leopardi di Churchill
- Italian poster
- Directed by: Maurizio Pradeaux
- Written by: Maurizio Pradeaux; Arpad DeRiso; Federico De Urrutia
- Produced by: Roberto Capitani; Marcello Ciriaci
- Starring: Richard Harrison; Klaus Kinski
- Cinematography: Miguel Fernández Mila
- Edited by: Enzo Alabiso
- Music by: Franco Salina
- Release date: 14 August 1970 (Italy)
- Running time: 88 minutes
- Countries: Italy; Spain
- Language: Italian

Churchill's Leopards (Italian: I leopardi di Churchill, Spanish: Los Leopardos de Churchill) is a 1970 Italian-Spanish "macaroni combat" war film directed by Maurizio Pradeaux and starring Richard Harrison and Klaus Kinski.

== Plot ==
A British commando team heads into occupied France to blow up a German held dam in preparation for D-Day, while a British officer infiltrates the German garrison, posing as his recently dead German twin brother, in order to provide help from the inside. The German commander is, however, becoming very suspicious.

== Main cast ==
- Richard Harrison as Lt. Richard Benson / Lt. Hans Müller
- Pilar Velázquez as Elise
- Giacomo Rossi-Stuart as Major Powell
- Frank Braña as François Leduc
- Helga Liné as Marlene Schulman
- Antonio Casas as "La Tulipe"
- Klaus Kinski as Hauptsturmführer Holtz
- Herb Andress

== See also ==
- Euro War
- War Film
