= Luciano Ercoli =

Italian film director (1929–2015)

- Born: 19 October 1929; Rome, Italy
- Died: 15 March 2015 (aged 85); Barcelona, Spain
- Occupations: Film director, film producer, screenwriter
- Years active: 1955–1977
- Spouse: Nieves Navarro

Luciano Ercoli (19 October 1929 – 15 March 2015) was an Italian film director, screenwriter, producer and unit production manager. Ercoli's career spanned approximately two decades before his retirement in the late 1970s, and saw him direct several films in the giallo genre, as well producing several Spaghetti Westerns. Ercoli was married to Spanish actress Nieves Navarro, who has appeared in several of the films he worked on.

== Life and career ==
Ercoli was born in Rome, Italy, on 19 October 1929. His first film credit was as an assistant director for the 1955 film Rice Girl, directed by Raffaello Matarazzo. Ercoli then acted as a film producer on several titles throughout the 1960s, before making his directorial début in 1970, helming the giallo film Le foto proibite di una signora per bene, which he also produced and edited. Ercoli went on to direct several more films throughout the early to mid-1970s, including Il figlio della sepolta viva and The Magnificent Dare Devil.

Ercoli was married to Spanish actress Nieves Navarro, who has appeared in several of his giallo films, starring in 1971's Death Walks on High Heels and 1972's Death Walks at Midnight. Navarro had also appeared in lesser roles in Le foto proibite di una signora per bene, and the Ercoli-produced Spaghetti Westerns A Pistol for Ringo and The Return of Ringo. Ercoli, described as "one of the first directors to jump on the thriller bandwagon", retired from the film industry in the late 1970s after inheriting "a fortune". His last role was as the director of the 1975 poliziottesco film Killer Cop.

Ercoli's final film was La Bidonata from 1977. La Bidonata, also known as The Big Ripoff, was released as an extra on the DVD release of the Italian thriller Colt 38 Special Squad.

== Filmography ==
| Year | Film | Role |
|---|---|---|
| 1955 | Rice Girl | Assistant director |
| 1960 | Il mondo di notte | Unit production manager |
| 1961 | Odissea nuda | Producer |
| 1964 | What Ever Happened to Baby Toto? | Producer |
| 1965 | A Pistol for Ringo | Producer |
| 1966 | The Return of Ringo | Producer |
| 1970 | Le foto proibite di una signora per bene | Director, producer and editor |
| 1971 | Death Walks on High Heels | Director |
| 1972 | Death Walks at Midnight | Director |
| 1974 | Il figlio della sepolta viva | Director (as André Colbert) |
| 1974 | Young Lucrezia | Director (as André Colbert) |
| 1974 | The Magnificent Dare Devil | Director |
| 1975 | Killer Cop | Director |
| 1977 | La Bidonata | Director |

== Footnotes ==
=== References ===
- Bondanella, Peter E. (2009). A History of Italian Cinema (illustrated ed.). Continuum International Publishing Group. ISBN 978-1441160690.
- Shipka, Danny (2011). Perverse Titillation: The Exploitation Cinema of Italy, Spain and France, 1960–1980 (illustrated ed.). McFarland & Company. ISBN 978-0786448883.
