= House of 1000 Pleasures =

1973 film

- Directed by: Antonio Margheriti
- Written by: Antonio Margheriti; Dino Verde
- Starring: Barbara Bouchet; Femi Benussi
- Cinematography: Sergio D'Offizi
- Edited by: Otello Colangeli
- Music by: Carlo Savina
- Distributed by: Medusa
- Release date: 1973
- Language: Italian

House of 1000 Pleasures (Italian: Finalmente... le mille e una notte, lit. 'Finally...the thousand and one nights', also known as Bed of a Thousand Pleasures and 1001 Nights of Pleasure) is a 1973 commedia sexy all'italiana film co-written and directed by Antonio Margheriti.

== Cast ==
- Barbara Bouchet as Mariam
- Femi Benussi as Zumurud
- Barbara Marzano as Queen Aziza
- Esmeralda Barros as the storyteller
- Pupo De Luca as Samandar
- Gastone Pescucci as Karim
- Alberto Atenari as Raji
- Ignazio Leone as Mariam's husband
- Annie Carol Edel as Zobeide
- Gino Milli as Aladino
- Remo Capitani as Sultan Almamud
- Vassili Karis as Aziza's servant
- Gigi Ballista as Genie in the lamp
- Gigi Bonos as Baba
- Salvatore Puntillo

== Production ==
The film was a co-production between Medusa and Pink International Film. Loosely inspired by One Thousand and One Nights, its production started shortly after Pier Paolo Pasolini announced the similarly themed Arabian Nights. Davide Pulici from Nocturno described it as a film with a strange status: "on the one hand a copy of an idea [Pasolini], on the other an original and pragmatic model" of numerous rip-offs.

== Release ==
The film was released in Italian cinemas by Medusa on 7 December 1973.

== Reception ==
Italian film critic Marco Giusti wrote that, despite some "trash" elements, the film is "an extremely well-done decameronico, pursuing more the path of the fantastic than the erotic [...] with above-average special effects". Similarly, Nocturno's Davide Pulici described it as an above-average decameronico, both narratively, thanks to Dino Verde's involvement, and visually, due to rich sets, D'Offizi's virtuosistic cinematography and Margheriti's visual effects.
