= The Weapon, the Hour & the Motive =

- Directed by: Francesco Mazzei
- Written by: Francesco Mazzei; Marcello Aliprandi; Mario Bianchi (screenplay); Bruno Di Geronimo (screenplay); Vinicio Marinucci (screenplay)
- Produced by: Francesco Mazzei
- Starring: Renzo Montagnani; Eva Czemerys; Bedy Moratti
- Cinematography: Giovanni Ciarlo
- Edited by: Alberto Gallitti
- Music by: Francesco De Masi
- Release date: 1972
- Running time: 105 minutes
- Country: Italy
- Language: Italian

L'arma, l'ora, il movente, internationally released as The Weapon, the Hour, the Motive, is a 1972 Italian giallo film produced, co-written and directed by Francesco Mazzei. It is the first giallo that showed a corrupt priest as victim of a crime, a plot that would become a topos of the genre. Co-plotter Marcello Aliprandi went on to create another similar film in 1982, involving murder and Catholicism, entitled The Vatican Conspiracy.

== Plot ==
Don Giorgio (Maurizio Bonuglia), a handsome priest who teaches in a convent, has been having affairs with two different women. He decides to break off relations with both of them, and soon after he is murdered. The police suspect one of the two women of the murder, but the field is narrowed when one of the two women has her throat slashed. The police learn that a little boy (Arturo Trina) witnessed one of the killings, but they're not sure if he is reliable.

== Cast ==
- Renzo Montagnani as Commissario Franco Boito
- Bedy Moratti as Orchidea Durantini
- Eva Czemerys as Giulia Pisani
- Maurizio Bonuglia as Don Giorgio
- Francesco D'Adda as Giulia's Husband
- Adolfo Belletti as Anselmo Barsetti
- Arturo Trina as Ferruccio
- Salvatore Puntillo as Moriconi
- Claudia Gravy as Sister Tarquinia
- Gina Mascetti as Mother Superior
- Alcira Harris
