= Kill the Poker Player =

1972 film

- Film poster
- Italian: Hai sbagliato... dovevi uccidermi subito!
- Directed by: Mario Bianchi
- Screenplay by: Mario Bianchi; Paola Bianchini; Luis G. de Blain
- Story by: Mario Bianchi
- Produced by: Silvio Battistini
- Starring: Robert Woods; Susan Scott; Frank Braña; Carlo Gaddi; Ernesto Colli; Ivano Staccioli
- Cinematography: Rafael Pacheco
- Edited by: Marcello Malvestito
- Music by: Carlo Savina
- Production companies: Kinesis Films; Mundial Films
- Distributed by: Mundial Films; Loving the Classics
- Release dates: 9 April 1972 (Italy); 15 November 1972 (Spain)
- Running time: 94 min
- Country: Italy
- Language: Italian

Kill the Poker Player (Italian: Hai sbagliato... dovevi uccidermi subito!) is a 1972 Italian western film directed by Mario Bianchi and starred by Robert Woods, Ivano Staccioli and Nieves Navarro. It was scored by Carlo Savina and written by Mario Bianchi, Paola Bianchini and Luis G de Blain. It has been described as a mix between western, giallo and horror.

== Cast ==
- Robert Woods as Jonathan Pinkerton
- Frank Braña as Sheriff Lewis Burton
- Susan Scott as Kate
- Carlo Gaddi as Karl
- Ernesto Colli as Dr. Torres
- Ivano Staccioli as Clinton
- Enrico Canestrini
- Francesco D'Adda as Piano Player
- Vittorio Fanfoni
- Irio Fantini
- Filippo Marcelli
- Ottorino Polentini
- Saturno Cerra as Robber Accomplice
- Ernesto Vañes
- Rafael Albaicín
- Omero Capanna as Fred, Clinton Foreman
- María Luisa Tobar
- Tino Braña
- María Dolores Tobar
- José Luis Lizalde
- Miguel Guzmán
