= Eva Czemerys =

German-born film actress

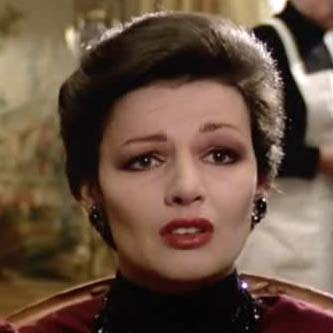
- Czemerys in Hallucination Strip (1975)
- Born: 1940 (age 84–85); Munich, Germany
- Occupation: Actress

Eva Czemerys (born 1940) is a German-born film actress, mainly active in Italy.

Born in Munich to Russian parents, her family moved to Rome, Italy when she was only 1. She studied acting and debuted as the main actress in 1971 in Bella di giorno moglie di notte. She was a minor starlet in Italian cinema, especially in commedie sexy all'italiana and giallo films. Czemerys retired from showbusiness in the mid-eighties and focused on volunteering.

== Selected filmography ==
- Bella di giorno moglie di notte (1971)
- The Weapon, the Hour & the Motive (1972)
- The Eroticist (1972)
- Poppea: A Prostitute in Service of the Emperor (1972)
- Women in Cell Block 7 (1973)
- Long Lasting Days (1973)
- Sixteen (1973)
- The Killer Reserved Nine Seats (1974)
- Il figlio della sepolta viva (1974)
- Hallucination Strip (1975)
- How to Kill a Judge (1975)
- Escape from the Bronx (1983)
- Le feu sous la peau (1985)
