= Death Steps in the Dark =

- Directed by: Maurizio Pradeaux
- Written by: Arpad De Riso; Maurizio Pradeaux
- Starring: Leonard Mann; Robert Webber
- Cinematography: Aldo Ricci
- Edited by: Eugenio Alabiso
- Music by: Riz Ortolani
- Release date: 1977
- Running time: 95 minutes
- Countries: Italy; Greece
- Language: Italian

Death Steps in the Dark (Italian: Passi di morte perduti nel buio, which translates as Death Steps Lost in the Dark) is a 1977 Italian-Greek giallo film directed by Maurizio Pradeaux. Pradeaux directed only one other giallo, the 1973 Death Carries a Cane.

== Plot ==
Italian reporter Luciano Morelli (Leonard Mann) is taking an express train to Greece from Istanbul with his girlfriend, Swedish up-and-coming model Ingrid Stelmossen. Several other passengers are in their car, including a Lebanese man, a Greek socialite woman, a Turkish priest, and a nervous young French woman. One passenger goes to the lavatory to clip some wires for the lighting in their car, leaving their black gloves behind. As the train goes into a darkened tunnel, a scream is heard, and once light comes through again, the young, nervous woman is seen murdered. Luciano's letter opener is lodged in her heart.

Despite the inspector questioning all the passengers in the car, Luciano is treated as the prime suspect due to the murder weapon. No suspects are allowed to leave and have their passports taken. However, a young bisexual singer and entrepreneur, Ulla, hears from her boyfriend, Raul, that he has one of the killer's gloves and is planning an extortion. The killer receives a ransom for thousands of drachmas in exchange for the glove's return. Ulla wants Raul to demand double, but he keeps himself at the asking price to not provoke the killer. At the arranged meeting place, the killer leaves the money as a lure for Raul, then cracks his head with a wooden post and slashes his throat.

Luciano retcons with an acquaintance in organized crime, where the guy translates a local paper saying he's the prime suspect in the train murder. After some time in disguise, he's offered a place to hide—a fishing cabin right next to train tracks—which is highly unideal for him. He tries to call Ingrid for supplies he needs and a discreet rendezvous, but the inspector picks up the call when Ingrid doesn't come up with a convincing ruse. The police still don't find Luciano, and he's frustrated when Ingrid doesn't bring the food and water he wanted.

The remaining passengers' lives play out in the meantime. The Lebanese passenger watches the investigation from afar; the priest isn't a priest and just uses the guise to meet his mistress in Greece; and the socialite wants a divorce from her husband. Ulla is with another lover of hers, Teodorus Teodopolous, where she sponsors a sculpture of her head as a bust. She, in the meantime, has left the killer another blackmail note with a higher ransom. When she sings at a nightclub one night, Luciano demands answers from her, and she agrees to a meeting the next day. Ulla places the glove in a Chinese box and gives it to Teodorus for safekeeping. But that night, the killer breaks into the apartment Ulla shares with a girlfriend, murders her girlfriend by drowning and slashing her on the roof, then kills Ulla by closing her in a bathroom door and slashing her too.

The inspector catches up to Luciano but leaves him little time to prove his innocence after arresting a drug dealer who approaches them both. Desperate, Luciano insists on breaking into Teodorus home to get Ulla's bust for a plan. His friend hooks him up with a woman who works as a crime boss, and for a hefty price, they arrange the heist. But the boss' daughter arrives with Luciano and Ingrid the night of the burglary and is having her first safe cracking, which dashes Luciano's hopes. Luciano's friend ditches them all when the pressure's on to evade the cops, but they successfully break in. They can't crack the safe until Ingrid opens it by accident, but the killer murders Teodorus in the house and flees, leaving the trio to find him dead. They snatch the bust and run before the responders arrive.

All three remaining suspects are invited to a fashion show, with Ingrid as the main event. While Luciano and the inspector watch, each one is offered a cigarette, with both the Lebanese citizen and the priest refusing. The socialite takes a light, but sees "Ulla" lit her cigarette. She screams and flees, revealing herself as the killer. Ingrid is confused, but Luciano and the police chase the woman. She's haunted by all the people she killed badly enough that, when she reaches a rooftop, she stumbles off and plummets to the gravel below, falling to her death. The young safe cracker arrives, revealing she wore a mask made from Ulla's bust to catch the killer in the trap.

The inspector confesses that he knew Luciano wasn't guilty and was glad he came up with his plan. The woman, Ida Tuclidis, wanted to be more excited than her unsatisfactory husband, so she ran with a crowd of drug traffickers. The French woman was going to report her, so Tuclidis planned the murder on the train. Teodorus ran in the same circle, and Ulla recognized Tuclidis from the papers, so Tuclidis killed them all and stole the black glove back to stop the blackmail and eliminate all witnesses. The Lebanese man works as a narcotics officer and was on Tuclidis' trail when the killings occurred. The young safe cracker blabs about the burglary, so Luciano warns her about the cops present; the turnout in the end is left ambiguous.

== Cast ==
- Leonard Mann as Luciano Morelli
- Robert Webber as Inspector
- Vera Kruska as Ingrid Stelmosson
- Nino Maimone as Omar Effendi
- Barbara Seidel as Ida Tuclidis
- Albertina Capuani
- Luigi Romano
- Bartolillo Palma
- Susy Jennings as Ulla
- Imelde Marani

== See also ==
- List of Italian films of 1977
