= Ivano Staccioli =

Italian film actor (1927–1995)

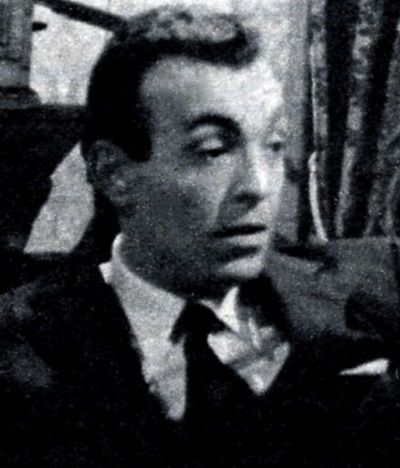
- Ivano Staccioli in 1962
- Born: 3 January 1927; Siena, Italy
- Died: 15 July 1995 (aged 68); Roma, Italy
- Other name: John Heston
- Years active: 1960 - 1991

Ivano Staccioli (3 January 1927 – 15 July 1995) was an Italian film actor.

== Careetr ==
Staccioli made 70 appearances between 1960 and 1991, mostly in film. He is best known for his appearances in historical adventures and action or western films in the 1960s. Particularly in the early 1960s he appeared in many gladiatorial films or ancient epics. In 1965 he starred in the western Gold Train and A 008, operazione Sterminio, a spoof of the James Bond genre.

In the mid to late 1960s he was often credited as John Heston for Italian films dubbed for the American audience, particularly his westerns. He also appeared in a number of Italian giallo films, such as Death Walks at Midnight and The Flower with the Petals of Steel. Two of his last films before retiring were controversial Nazi death camp films, KZ9 and SS Girls, both directed by Bruno Mattei.

== Selected filmography ==
- Pia de' Tolomei (1958)
- Knight Without a Country (1959)
- The Nights of Lucretia Borgia (1959) - Fossombrone
- The Loves of Salammbo (1960) - Gell
- Lipstick (1960) - Dott. Mauri
- Cleopatra's Daughter (1960)
- La grande vallata (1961)
- Spade senza bandiera (1961) - Jester
- Blood Feud (1961)
- The Centurion (1961) - Hippolytus
- Ursus and the Tartar Princess (1961) - Prince Ahmed
- Ultimatum alla vita (1962) - Nazi soldier
- Il vecchio testamento (1962)
- Triumph of the Ten Gladiators (1963) - Gladiator
- Rome Against Rome (1964) - Sirion
- Il ribelle di Castelmonte (1964) - Duke Alberto Di Castelmonte
- 008: Operation Exterminate (1964) - Kemp
- Gold Train (1965) - Black
- 3 colpi di Winchester per Ringo (1966) - Daniels
- A... For Assassin (1966) - George Prescott
- The Sea Pirate (1966) - Decrees
- Il grande colpo di Surcouf (1966) - Decrees
- Two Sons of Ringo (1966) - Burt 'The Bear Trap'
- Kriminal (1966) - Alex Lafont
- Flashman (1967) - Kid
- Il lungo, il corto, il gatto (1967) - Il Gatto
- Any Gun Can Play (1967) - Il capitano
- Samoa, Queen of the Jungle (1968) - Pierre Moro
- God Made Them... I Kill Them (1968) - Judge Kincaid
- ...dai nemici mi guardo io! (1968) - Luis Garcia
- Commandos (1968) - Rodolfo - Radio Man
- The Nephews of Zorro (1968) - Captain Martines
- Lady Desire (1968)
- Cemetery Without Crosses (1969) - Vallee Brother
- La battaglia del deserto (1969) - Salter
- Quel giorno Dio non c'era (Il caso Defregger) (1969) - German Officer
- Formula 1: Nell'Inferno del Grand Prix (1970) - Jim Connors
- A Sword for Brando (1970)
- A Girl Called Jules (1970) - Professore di filosofia
- Le Mans, Shortcut to Hell (1970) - TV host (uncredited)
- Have a Good Funeral, My Friend... Sartana Will Pay (1970) - Blackie
- Road to Salina (1970) - Linda's Husband
- They Call Him Cemetery (1971) - Avelin
- African Story (1971) - Florio
- The Devil Has Seven Faces (1971) - Hank
- And the Crows Will Dig Your Grave (1972) - Donovan
- Kill the Poker Player (1972) - Clinton
- So Sweet, So Dead (1972) - The Liar
- Death Walks at Midnight (1973) - Prof. Otto Wuttenberg
- Studio legale per una rapina (1973) - Felix
- Li chiamavano i tre moschettieri... invece erano quattro (1973) - Cardinal Richelieu
- The Flower with the Petals of Steel (1973) - Ispettore Garrano
- Afrika (1973) - Prof. Philip Stone
- Una donna per 7 bastardi (1974) - Smith
- Ciak si muore (1974) - Richard Hanson
- SS Girls (1977) - General Berger
- Gola profonda nera (1977) - Jose Depardieu
- KZ9 - Lager di sterminio (1977) - Wieker, the Camp Commander
- Ultimo confine (1994) - (final film role)

== External links and sources ==
- Ivano Staccioli at IMDb
