= Simón Andreu =

Spanish actor

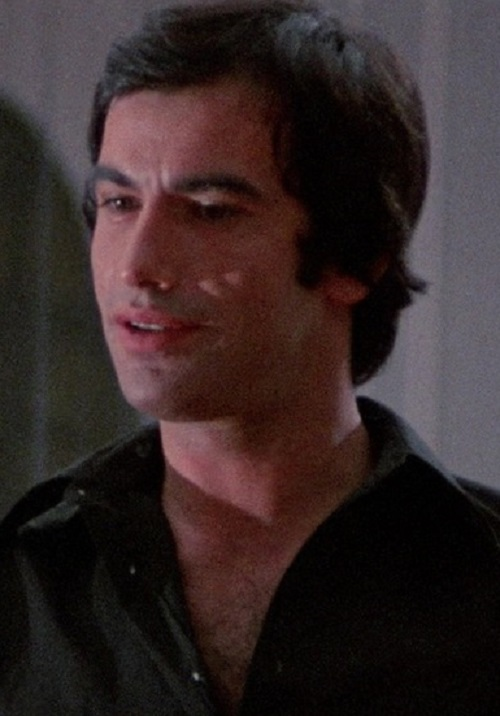
- Andreu in Forbidden Photos of a Lady Above Suspicion (1970)
- Born: Simón Andreu Trobat; 1 January 1941 (age 85); Sa Pobla, Mallorca, Spain
- Occupation: Actor
- Years active: 1961–present

Simón Andreu Trobat (born 1 January 1941) is a Spanish actor. He has appeared in more than 180 films and television shows since 1961. In 2013 he was awarded the Nosferatu Award at the Festival Internacional de Cinema Fantàstic de Catalunya for his long career.

== Selected filmography ==
- Rocío from La Mancha (1963)
- The Good Love (1963)
- Constance aux enfers (1963)
- Ballad of a Bounty Hunter (1968)
- Forbidden Photos of a Lady Above Suspicion (1970)
- Death Walks on High Heels (1971)
- Bad Man's River (1971)
- Spaniards in Paris (1971)
- The Blood Spattered Bride (1972)
- Death Walks at Midnight (1972)
- Those Dirty Dogs (1973)
- Children of Rage (1975)
- Hidden Pleasures (1977)
- El sacerdote (1979)
- Flesh+Blood (1985)
- El viaje a ninguna parte (1986)
- Fine Gold (1989)
- Prince of Shadows (1991)
- The Shooter (1995)
- The Sea (2000)
- Die Another Day (2002) - Dr. Alvarez
- Beyond Re-Animator (2003)
- Bridget Jones: The Edge of Reason (2004)
- Eyes of Crystal (2004)
- Nero (2005)
- The Chronicles of Narnia: Prince Caspian (2008) - Lord Scythley
- Little Ashes (2008) - Fernando de Valle
- I Come with the Rain (2009)
- The Way (2010) - Don Santiago
- The Cold Light of Day (2012) - Pizarro
- Prim, el asesinato de la calle del Turco (2014) - General Serrano
- The Infiltrator (2016) - Gonzalo Mora Sr.
- Wild Oats (2016) - Manager
- The Promise (2016) - Old Peasant Man
- Verano Rojo (2017) - Abuelo
- Las Chicas Del Cable (2017, TV Series) - Ricardo Cifuentes
- Josephine (2021)
