= Il figlio della sepolta viva =

1974 film

- Directed by: Luciano Ercoli
- Written by: Aurelia Tuzzi
- Starring: Fred Robsahm; Eva Czemerys
- Cinematography: Aldo De Robertis
- Music by: Franco Micalizzi
- Release date: 1974
- Country: Italy
- Language: Italian

Il figlio della sepolta viva is a 1974 Italian drama film directed by Luciano Ercoli. Based on the novel with the same name written by Carolina Invernizio, it is part of the Invernizio's revival occurred in the early 1970s. In this adaptation Ercoli emphasized the gothic horror elements of the melodramatic plot.

== Cast ==
- Fred Robsahm: François
- Eva Czemerys: Giovanna de Cambise
- Pier Maria Rossi: L'Italiano
- Gianni Cavina: Dany
- Gabriella Lepori: Elisabetta
- Piero Lulli: Amadeus
