= Mannaja =

1977 film by Sergio Martino

- Italian theatrical release poster
- Directed by: Sergio Martino
- Screenplay by: Sauro Scavolini; Sergio Martino
- Story by: Sergio Martino
- Produced by: Luciano Martino
- Starring: Maurizio Merli; John Steiner; Sonja Jeannine; Donald O'Brien; Philippe Leroy; Martine Brochard
- Cinematography: Federico Zanni
- Edited by: Eugenio Alabiso
- Music by: Guido & Maurizio De Angelis
- Production companies: Devon Film; Medusa Distribuzione
- Distributed by: Medusa Distribuzione
- Release date: 1977
- Running time: 101 minutes
- Country: Italy
- Language: Italian

Mannaja (also known as A Man Called Blade) is an Italian 1977 spaghetti Western film directed by Sergio Martino. The main role, Blade, is played by Maurizio Merli. Other central roles are played by: John Steiner, Sonja Jeannine, Donald O'Brien, Philippe Leroy and Martine Brochard.

== Plot ==
Bounty hunter Blade (Maurizio Merli), who uses a tomahawk as a throwing weapon, arrives at the mining town of Suttonville with the outlaw Burt Craven (Donald O'Brien) as his prisoner. His real motive is to kill mining big boss McGowan (Philippe Leroy) who has killed his father. Blade gives up his revenge – because McGowan "is not worth it" – and instead accepts to deliver the ransom for the mine owner's daughter (Sonja Jeannine). However, this mission fails because she turns out to be the lover of her kidnapper, McGowan's foreman Voller (John Steiner), who secretly works for a gang that regularly robs the shipments of silver from the mine. Voller then kills his boss and turns his mining empire into bloody chaos by massacring the mine workers. Blade is beaten up and buried up to his neck and left to be blinded by the sun. However, he survives and returns for a showdown with Voller.

== Cast ==
- Maurizio Merli as Blade (Mannaja)
- John Steiner as Theo Voller
- Sonja Jeannine as Deborah McGowan
- Donald O'Brien as Burt Craven
- Philippe Leroy as Ed McGowan
- Martine Brochard as Angela
- Salvatore Puntillo as Johnny
- Antonio Casale as Dahlman
- Enzo Fiermonte as the government agent
- Rick Battaglia as the father of Mannaja
- Aldo Rendine as the robbed man
- Enzo Maggio as the old man
- Sergio Tardioli as the bartender
- Sophia Lombardo as Lucy

== Music ==
The film's score was composed and performed by Guido & Maurizio De Angelis, whose soundtrack has been described as "[veering] unpredictability between Italian Western ballads, contemporary pop songs, synth-led horror motifs and 1970s prog rock."

== Release ==
Mannaja was released in 1977. It grossed a 750 million Italian lire (about 1/2 million US dollars) domestically in Italy.

It was released on DVD by Blue Underground.

== Reception ==
In his investigation of narrative structures in Spaghetti Western films, Fridlund ranges Mannaja among stories obeying the "Tragic Mercenary" plot where the pursuit of a monetary motive entails the killing or wounding of someone close to the hero, who then sets out on a vengeance mission. This story appears in the very influential Django. In the case of Blade his economic arrangement with the man he should have killed sets off a course of action leading to him being tortured and to the death of the showgirl Angela, who loves him. The situation where a kidnapped woman betrays her savior because she is the lover of her would-be abductor also appears in Ten Thousand Dollars for a Massacre - another "Tragic Mercenary" story.

== Notes ==
=== References ===
- Curti, Roberto (2013). Italian Crime Filmography, 1968–1980. McFarland. ISBN 978-0786469765.
