= Death Walks on High Heels =

- Italian film poster
- Directed by: Luciano Ercoli
- Screenplay by: Ernesto Gastaldi; Mahnahén Velasco
- Story by: Ernesto Gastaldi; Mahnahén Velasco; Dino Verde
- Produced by: Alberto Pugliese; Luciano Ercoli
- Starring: Frank Wolff; Susan Scott; Simón Andreu; Carlo Gentili; Fabrizio Moresco; J. Manuel Martin; George Rigaud; Luciano Rossi; Claudie Lange
- Cinematography: Fernando Arribas
- Edited by: Angelo Curi
- Music by: Stelvio Cipriani
- Production companies: Cinecompany; Atlántida Films
- Distributed by: Cineriz
- Release dates: 19 November 1971 (Italy); 2 April 1972 (Spain)
- Running time: 105 minutes (Italy); 98 minutes (Spain)
- Countries: Italy; Spain
- Languages: Italian; English
- Box office: ESP 24,592,669 (Spain)

Death Walks on High Heels (Italian: La morte cammina con i tacchi alti, Spanish: La muerte camina con tacón alto) is a 1971 giallo film directed and co-produced by Luciano Ercoli. It starred Frank Wolff and Susan Scott, co-written by Ernesto Gastaldi, with music by Stelvio Cipriani. It was also released as Death Stalks in High Heels and Nights of Love and Terror.

== Plot ==
A beautiful French stripper named Nicole Rochard (Susan Scott) learns that her father was stabbed to death on a train, and she is questioned by the police about some missing diamonds. It transpires that Nicole’s father, Ernest Rochard, was a famed thief although he had since "gone straight". Shortly after this Nicole begins receiving threatening phone calls from a mysterious character who uses a voice changer. Later while performing at nightclubs Nicole is watched and filmed by a distinguished looking gentleman (Frank Wolff), who meets her in person in her dressing room after sending her flowers. The man with the voice changer calls a second time and a frightened Nicole returns to her apartment. The man appears in person wearing a black ski-mask with piercing blue eyes and threatens the woman with a razor and demands to know where the diamonds are. Following these events, Nicole goes to the apartment of her boyfriend Michel (Simon Andreu) where she spends the night.

In the morning, Nicole discovers Michel has a pair of blue contact lenses and flees in a panic believing him to be the masked man. She meets up with the handsome stranger from before who is Dr. Robert Matthews, a British eye-surgeon. Nicole begs Matthews to take her away from Paris. The two fly to London where Nicole goes on a shopping spree and is taken by Matthews to his countryside getaway in a remote part of the country. The locals are shown to be quite unfriendly and conservative and the wily Dr. Matthews attempts to pass off his new lover as his wife. He explains that all his money comes from his real wife Vanessa. Despite her feelings for Matthews, Nicole quickly becomes unnerved by the new location including Dr. Matthews handyman, a sinister local named Hallory (Luciano Rossi), who has a false hand. Its revealed someone is spying on Dr. Matthews house from nearby and specifically targeting Nicole. Dr. Matthews has to leave for work but upon his return he takes Nicole to a nearby tavern where they meet Captain Lenny (George Riguad) about a new boat. Nicole overhears the local clergyman talking on the phone with a voice changer and is frightened and demands to be taken home. Matthews drops Nicole off but tells her he has to leave again for London. That night the person with the telescope continues to spy on Nicole and a woman in black is seen entering the house and offering large amounts of money to Nicole.

The next day Matthews returns but finds Nicole missing. Hallory claims to have never seen Nicole leave and Captain Lenny tells Dr. Matthews the whole village believes Nicole ran away with another man. Dr. Matthews travels to London to perform an eye surgery on an elderly man named Smith who is blind. Following the operation, a mysterious woman appears in the dark and shoots Matthews in his shoulder, wounding him nonfatally. The police immediately launch an investigation and the hardnosed Inspector Baxter focuses on the small details including the drugged Dr. Matthews asking for "Nicole" post-surgery even though his wife is named Vanessa. Both Vanessa and Smith deny knowing anyone named Nicole. Upon the police traveling to the fishing village, its shown that Nicole's body has been fished out of the water by local fisherman Phillips. A drunken Michel appears and is questioned by the suspicious police who think he had something to do with his girlfriends death. Inspector Baxter takes Michel's passport but lets him go. Michel sees Captain Lenny hanging around nearby and questions him about what happened. In London, Baxter questions Dr. Matthews who firmly denies it was Nicole who shot at him. Michel shows up at Vanessa Matthews house and threatens her with violence unless she tells him why she was seen in the village the night Nicole died.

Baxter hauls Michel in for questioning and he admits that Captain Lenny told him he saw a mysterious woman in the village. The Inspector takes Michel and Vanessa to sit-down with Captain Lenny who is unsure if Vanessa was the woman after all. Following this they go to Dr. Matthews cottage where the gate is easily opened by Vanessa, revealing she has been there before. Forced to confess. Mrs. Matthews tells Baxter that she paid off Nicole to leave Dr. Matthews and return to Paris. Later that night after Matthews has gone to bed, the same masked man who threatened Nicole shows up and sneaks into the house and brutally murders Vanessa. The police show up and are forced to sedate the distraught Dr. Matthews. Inspector Baxter visits the coroner’s office and after realizing that bodies kept on ice can alter the time of death becomes convinced that bricks of ice were used on Nicole’s body. This theory is confirmed by a visit to the other side of the cottage where a rope and anchor with room for a body and ice bricks is found in the water. Inspector Baxter and Bergson are leaving when they hear a shot from nearby. It came from the home of Captain Lenny, who had pulled a gun on Michel. The police arrive while Michel escapes using the Inspector’s car. Baxter questions Captain Lenny after seeing large amounts of money, it transpires that the captain was the one spying nightly on Nicole. He admits he saw a man but due to the rain he could not see his face. The money given to Nicole by Vanessa was stolen by the greedy Captain. Baxter arrests Captain Lenny and returns to London.

Michel soon phones the police and tells them to focus on the blind man Smith. Smith is hauled in for questioning and it all comes out that he was blinded in the diamond heist when Ernest Rochard accidentally turned the blowtorch towards his face. Smith reveals the final piece of information needed to solve the mystery: He and Rochard both agreed Nicole would keep the diamonds. Baxter, Bergson, Dr. Matthews, and Smith travel back to the cottage where a fight has broken out between the transvestite Hallory, dressed in the clothes of Nicole, and a furious Michel. Just as Hallory is about to kill Michel, the others arrive. Bergson discovers the blue contact lenses on Michel, seemingly confirming that he was the mysterious masked villain. Michel attempts to escape but gets knocked out with a judo chop from Inspector Baxter. Smith discovers the diamonds where they were hidden.

The case is seemingly closed as the men go to leave when the fisherman Phillips appears and mentions that he gave a bunch of ice to Dr. Matthews. Realizing the truth, the police confront Dr. Matthews. It turns out that Matthews and Rochard were partners and that Robert planned the heist and then double-crossed Rochard for the diamonds. Vanessa had told this to Nicole when she had visited her at the cottage, thus leading to Dr. Matthews having to eliminate both Nicole and his wife (who was the one who shot at him). It also is revealed that the blue contact lenses were planted in Michel’s apartment by Dr. Matthews as part of a frame-up. The movie ends with Inspector Baxter and Bergson seeing Michel off at the airport.

== Cast ==
- Frank Wolff as Dr. Robert Matthews
- Nieves Navarro as Nicole Rochard (credited as Susan Scott)
- Simón Andreu as Michel Aumont (credited as Simon Andreu)
- Carlo Gentili as Inspector Baxter
- George Rigaud as Captain Lenny
- José Manuel Martín as Smith (credited as J. Manuel Martin)
- Fabrizio Moresco as Bergson
- Luciano Rossi as Hallory
- Claudie Lange as Vanessa Matthews

== Critical reception ==
Allmovie gave the film a mixed review, citing its "demented screenplay" and "Luciano Ercoli's often overreaching direction" as drawbacks.
