= Schulmädchen-Report =

1970 film

- Directed by: Ernst Hofbauer
- Written by: Günther Hunold
- Produced by: Wolf C. Hartwig
- Starring: Günther Kieslich; Wolf Harnisch; Helga Kruck
- Music by: Gert Wilden
- Release date: 23 October 1970
- Running time: 90 min.
- Country: West Germany
- Language: German

Schulmädchen-Report: Was Eltern nicht für möglich halten (Schoolgirl Report Part 1: What Parents Don't Think Is Possible) (UK release title: Confessions of a Sixth Form Girl) is a 1970 West German sex report film directed by Ernst Hofbauer and produced by Wolf C. Hartwig.

== Background ==
The film is a pseudo-documentary loosely based on the non-fictional book Schulmädchen-Report by sexologist de:Günther Hunold. Published by Kindler Verlag in Munich in the same year, the book presented interviews with twelve teenage girls on their sexual lives.

== Reception ==
The film was a commercial success in 1970, topping the German cinema charts for weeks, becoming the first in a series that would last thirteen titles until 1980.

== Musical score ==
The music by Gert Wilden combined beat lounge and acid rock.

== Bibliography ==
- Faulstich, Werner (2005). Filmgeschichte (in German). Paderborn: Wilhelm Fink Verlag. pp. 173–175. ISBN 978-3-8252-2638-1.
- Miersch, Annette (2003). Schulmädchen-Report: der deutsche Sexfilm der 70er Jahre (in German). Berlin: Bertz + Fischer Verlag. ISBN 978-3-929470-12-3.
- Spencer, Kristopher (2008). Film and Television Scores, 1950–1979: A Critical Survey by Genre. Jefferson, NC: McFarland. ISBN 978-0-7864-3682-8.
