= Sex report film =

Film genre

Sex report films (German: Report-Filme) were pseudo-documentaries that had sexual life as their subject matter. Effectively sexploitation films, the genre was particularly popular in early 1970s Europe.

== Background ==
Mostly a German (or Germanophone) phenomenon, these films followed in the wake of the Kinsey and Masters and Johnson type reports as well as maintaining elements from the German-speaking educational films (Aufklärungsfilme) tradition. Producers Erwin C. Dietrich (particularly in the late 1960s) and Wolf C. Hartwig were active in the genre: the latter produced the Schulmädchen-Report films, which may be considered a subgenre on their own.

== After Schulmädchen-Report ==
The success of the Schulmädchen-Report: Was Eltern nicht für möglich halten in 1970 triggered a range of new films that had titles ending with the word -Report per norm, which ostensibly focused on certain populations and gradually lost their pseudo-documentary tone. Hausfrauen-Report (1971), Ehemänner-Report (1971), Lehrmädchen-Report (1972), Krankenschwestern-Report (1972), Zum zweiten Frühstück: Heiße Liebe (1972), Teenager-Report (1973) are examples of the genre, in which Ernst Hofbauer was a pioneering director.
