= Eugenio Alabiso =

Italian film editor

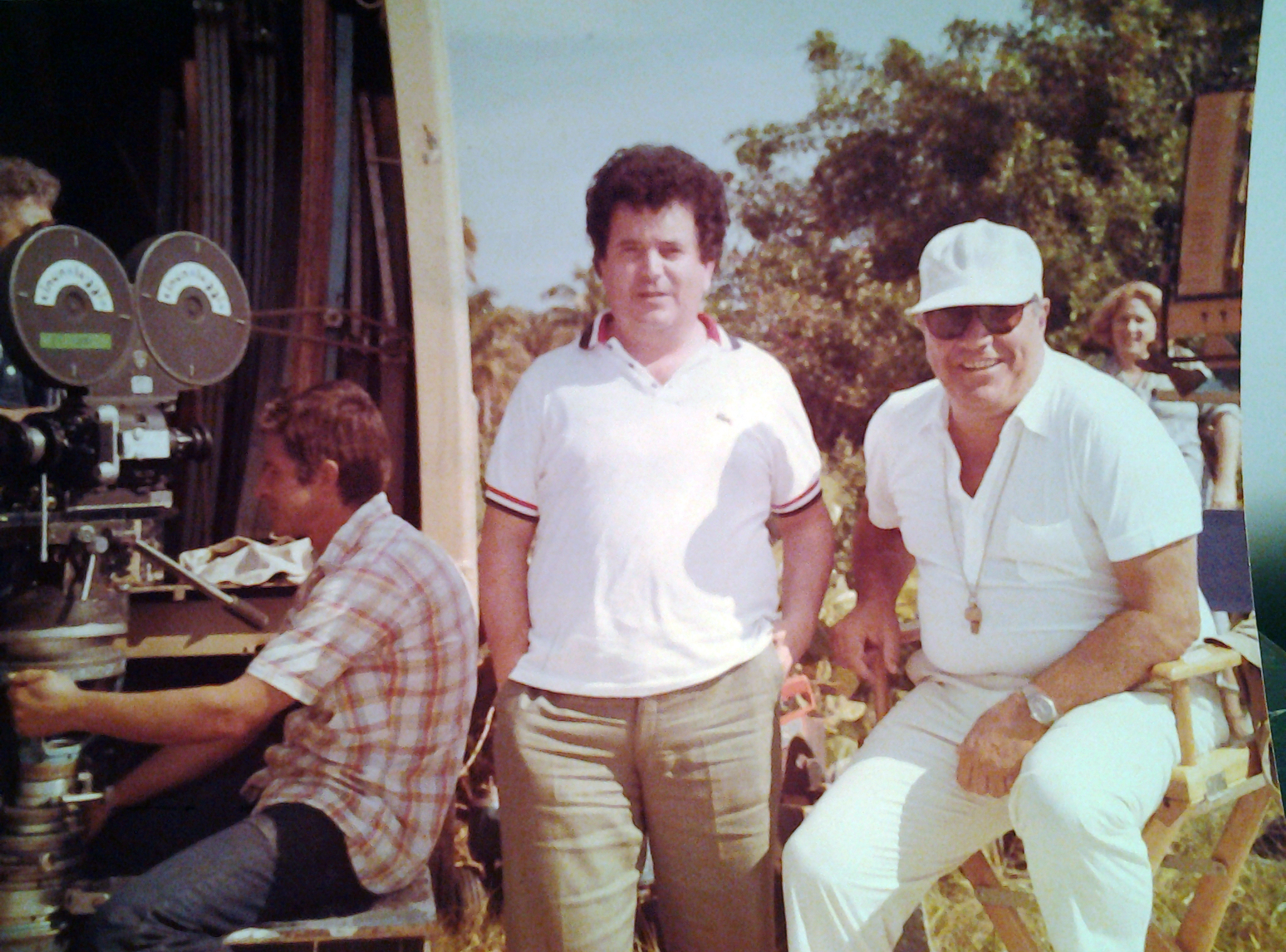
- Alabiso with Sergio Corbucci
- Born: 30 July 1937 (age 88); Rome, Lazio, Kingdom of Italy
- Occupation: Film editor

Eugenio Alabiso (born 30 July 1937) is an Italian film editor.

He edited The Good, the Bad and the Ugly (1966)

He edited The Case of the Scorpion's Tail (1971), Silent Action (1975), and The Scorpion with Two Tails (1982), directed by Sergio Martino, and Face to Face (1967), directed by Sergio Sollima. He worked in crime films like Long Lasting Days (1973), Almost Human (1974), Manhunt in the City (1975), and From Corleone to Brooklyn (1979), directed by Umberto Lenzi.

== Filmography ==
=== Films ===
- Deadly Kitesurf (2008)
- L'allenatore nel pallone 2 (2008)
- Bastardi (2008)
- Nemici per la pelle (2006)
- El khoubz el hafi (2005)
- Taxi Lovers (2005)
- Il monastero (2004)
- L'apparenza (2003)
- Stregeria (2003)
- La bella di Mosca (2001)
- Mozart Is a Murderer (1999)
- Cyberflic (1997)
- La ragazza di Cortina (1994)
- Troublemakers (1994)
- Il giorno del giudizio (1994)
- Craving Desire (1993)
- Un orso chiamato Arturo (1992)
- Lucky Luke (1991)
- Speaking of the Devil (1991)
- Mal d'Africa] (1990)
- American risciò (1989)
- Casablanca Express (1989)
- Acción suicida (1989)
- Io, Peter Pan (1989)
- The Opponent (1988)
- Holocausto caníbal 2 (1988)
- La famiglia Brandacci (1987)
- Provare per credere (1987)
- Tenerezza (1987)
- Un'australiana a Roma (1987)
- They Call Me Renegade (1987)
- Italiani a Rio (1987)
- The Barbarians (1987)
- Doppio misto (1986)
- Ferragosto O.K. (1986)
- Honor Thy Father (1986)
- The Lone Runner (1986)
- Bodycount, recuento de cadáveres (1986)
- Operation Nam (1986)
- Hands of Steel (1986)
- Mezzo destro mezzo sinistro - 2 calciatori senza pallone (1985)
- Wild Team (1985)
- L'allenatore nel pallone (1984)
- Thunder, policía sin ley (1983)
- 2019: After the Fall of New York (1983)
- Neapolitan Sting (1983)
- Ironmaster (1983)
- Acapulco, prima spiaggia... a sinistra (1983)
- Setenta y dos horas para pecar (1982)
- The Scorpion with Two Tails (1982)
- Bombardero (1982)
- Mademoiselle (1982)
- Ricas, riquisimas (1982)
- Freddie of the Jungle (1981)
- La doctora de los marineros (1981)
- Cream Horn (1981)
- Dos granujas en el Oeste (1981)
- Cuernos con salsa picante (1981)
- Do It with the Pamango (1980)
- Tony: Another Double Game (1980)
- La doctora seduce al coronel (1980)
- El supersheriff (1980)
- Orinoco, paraíso del sexo (1980)
- Azúcar y miel (1980)
- Super Fuzz (1980)
- La mujer de vacaciones, la amante en la ciudad (1980)
- La maestra va al mar con toda la clase (1980)
- El infierno de las mujeres (1980)
- Eaten Alive! (1980)
- Spaghetti (1980)
- Perdone, señorita, ¿es usted normal? (1979)
- Alligator (1979)
- Sábado, domingo y viernes (1979)
- El sheriff y el pequeño extraterrestre (1979)
- From Corleone to Brooklyn (1979)
- Operación Concorde (1979)
- Screamers (1979)
- Odds and Evens (1978)
- La mafia de los asesinos (1978)
- The Fifth Commandment (1978)
- La montaña del dios caníbal (1978)
- The Biggest Battle (1978)
- Double Game (1977)
- A Man Called Blade (1977)
- Crime Busters (1977)
- Death Steps in the Dark (1977)
- El cínico, el infame, el violento (1977)
- Erotic Exploits of a Sexy Seducer (1977)
- Carioca tigre (1976)
- Desnudémonos sin pudor (1976)
- Los violentos de Africa (1976)
- Mandinga (Ultraje a una raza) (1976)
- Emmanuelle blanca y negra (1976)
- Con la ley y con el hampa (1976)
- High Rollers (1976)
- El soldado de fortuna (1976)
- Sex with a Smile (1976)
- Los signos del zodíaco (1975)
- Africa express (1975)
- The Manhunt (1975)
- Silent Action (1975)
- Gambling City (1975)
- Shoot First... Ask Questions Later (1975)
- The Beast (1974)
- El contragolpe (1974)
- Póker de camas (1974)
- Almost Human (1974)
- The Killer Wore Gloves (1974)
- Dallas (1974)
- De tresillo no hay más que uno (1974)
- High School Girl (1974)
- Spasmo (1974)
- Long Lasting Days (1973)
- Ana, ese particular placer (1973)
- Milán, tiembla, la policía pide justicia (1973)
- The Killer with a Thousand Eyes (1973)
- Even Angels Eat Beans (1973)
- Pasos de danza sobre el filo de una navaja (1973)
- Torso (1973)
- La ruta del opio (1972)
- What Am I Doing in the Middle of a Revolution? (1972)
- Man of the East (1972)
- Los hijos del día y de la noche (1972)
- The Case of the Bloody Iris (1972)
- Sacrifice! (1972)
- Nights of Boccaccio (1972)
- Todos los colores de la oscuridad (1972)
- Siete orquídeas manchadas de rojo (1972)
- El bandido Malpelo (1971)
- El guapo (1971)
- Un lugar ideal para matar (1971)
- The Fifth Cord (1971)
- The Case of the Scorpion's Tail (1971)
- Los corsarios (1971)
- The Fourth Victim (1971)
- The Strange Vice of Mrs. Wardh (1971)
- Companeros (1970)
- Stagecoach of the Condemned (1970)
- Viva Cangaceiro (1970)
- A Sword for Brando (1970)
- The Unholy Four (1970)
- Así de dulce, así de maravillosa (1969)
- Gunman of Ave Maria (1969)
- Wages of Sin (1969)
- La batalla del desierto (1969)
- Bloody Che Contra (1969)
- América rugiente (1969)
- The Battle of El Alamein (1969)
- Appointment in Beirut (1969)
- The Mercenary (1968)
- Emma Hamilton (1968)
- To Hell and Back (1968)
- I Want Him Dead (1968)
- Go for Broke (1968)
- El dulce cuerpo de Deborah (1968)
- Django, Prepare a Coffin (1968)
- Vengeance Is Mine (1967)
- Cara a cara (1967)
- Dakota Joe (1967)
- 28 Minutes for 3 Million Dollars (1967)
- Desert commando (1967)
- Flashman contra el hombre invisible (1967)
- The Good, the Bad and the Ugly (1966)
- Man on the Spying Trapeze (1966)
- Furia en Marrakech (1966)
- Dollars for a Fast Gun (1966)
- For a Few Dollars More (1965)
- Misión en Hong Kong (1965)
- Sexy magico (1963)
- Supersexy '64 (1963)
- Notti e donne proibite (1963)
- Mondo Sexuality (1962)

=== Television series ===
- L'ispettore Giusti (1999)
- Private Crimes (1993)
- Lucky Luke (1992)
- Ocean (1956)

== Bibliography ==
- Bayman, Louis (2011). Directory of World Cinema: Italy. Intellect Books. p. 296. ISBN 9781841504001.
- Curti, Roberto (22 October 2013). Italian Crime Filmography, 1968-1980. McFarland Publishing. p. 332. ISBN 9780786469765.
