= Ernesto Gastaldi =

Italian screenwriter (born 1934)

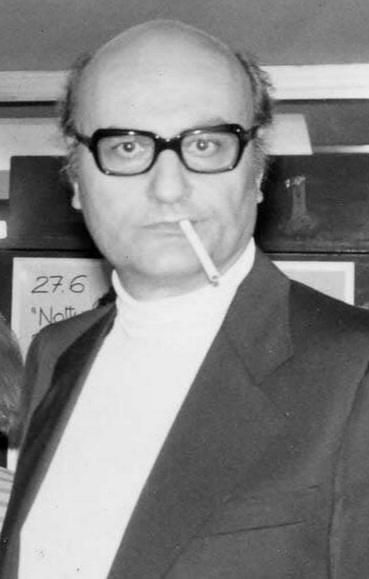
- Gastaldi in 1981
- Born: 10 September 1934 (age 92); Graglia, Italy
- Occupations: Screenwriter; film director
- Writing career
- Pen name: Julian Berry

Signature
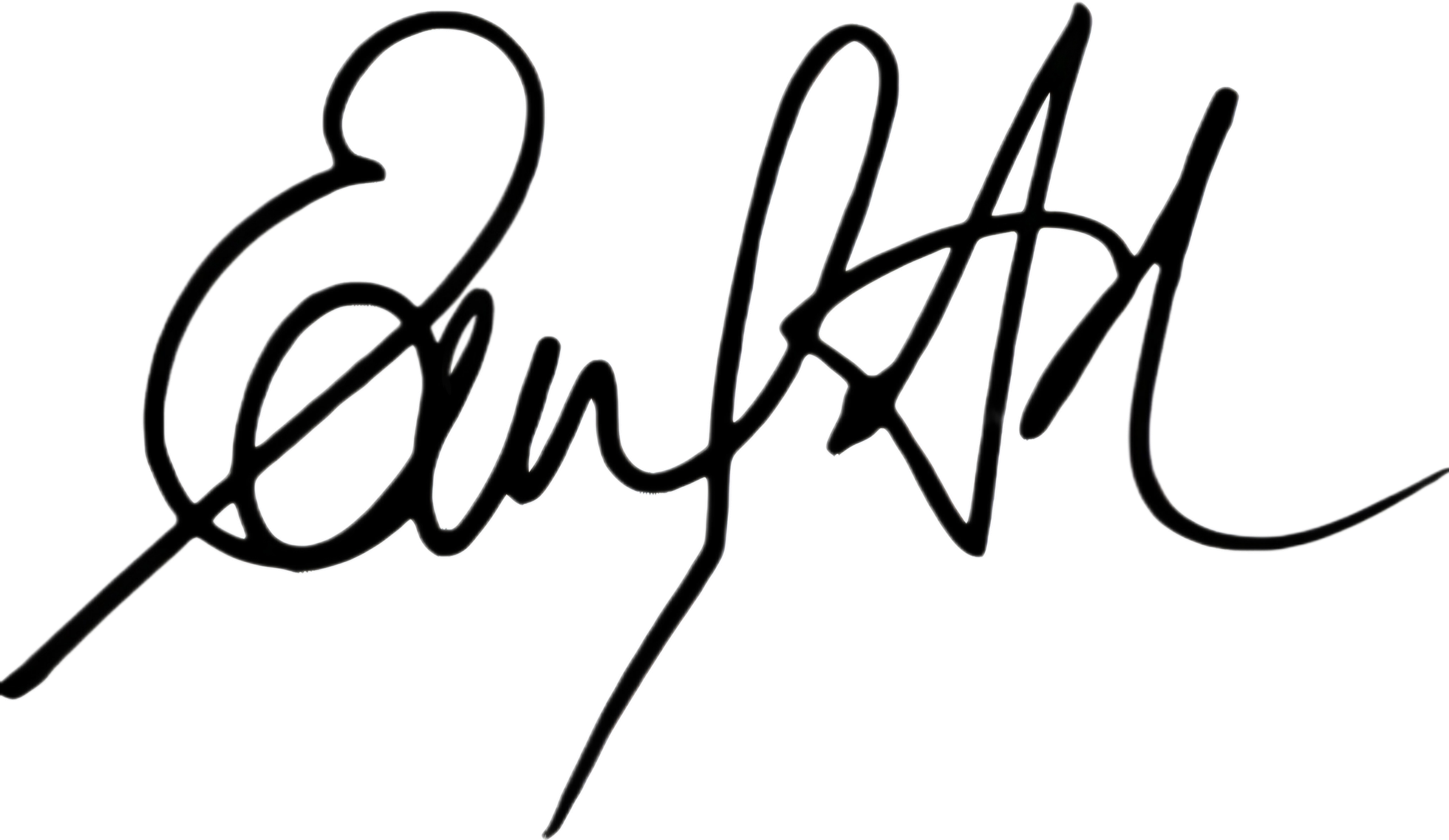

Ernesto Gastaldi (born 10 September 1934) is an Italian screenwriter and film director. Film historian and critic Tim Lucas described Gastaldi as the first Italian screenwriter to specialize in horror and thriller films. Gastaldi worked within several popular genres including pepla, Western and spy films.

== Biography ==
Ernesto Gastaldi was born on 10 September 1934 in Graglia in the province of Province of Biella, Piedmont. Gastaldi left his job as a clerk at the Sella bank in Biella to move to Rome where he was admitted into Centro Sperimentale di Cinematografia. After graduating, Gastaldi had trouble finding work. In 1957, Gastaldi wrote his first science fiction novel which the publishers requested an English-language name for the cover. Gastaldi was sharing an apartment at the time with an Anglo-Italian man named Julian Birri, whom he adapted his name to for his alias, Julian Berry. Gastaldi would write more crime and science fiction novels during this period such as Sangue intasca (1957) as James Duffy, Brivido sulla schiena (1957) as Freddy Foster and Tempo zero (1960) as Berry.

Gastaldi's debut as a screenwriter and assistant director was with the film The Vampire and the Ballerina by Renato Polselli. Gastaldi reflected on writing the film by stating that his working hours were from 8 in the morning until midnight, stating that "if someone had told me I was making a Gothic film I would have laughed." Other works in gothic horror included Gastaldi writing for Werewolf in a Girls' Dormitory, The Horrible Dr. Hichcock and The Whip and the Body. Following his gothic works, was his work in giallo film, where Gastaldi directed films such as Libido, which was released in 1965.

== Selected filmography ==
Title	Year	Credited as			Notes	Ref(s)
Title	Year	Screenwriter	Screen story writer	Other	Notes	Ref(s)
The Vampire and the Ballerina	1960	Yes	Yes			
Guns of the Black Witch	1961	Yes				
Werewolf in a Girls' Dormitory	1961	Yes				
Queen of the Seas	1961	Yes				
Venus Against the Son of Hercules	1962		Yes			
The Horrible Dr. Hichcock	1962	Yes	Yes			
Alone Against Rome	1962	Yes				
Avenger of the Seven Seas	1962	Yes				
Charge of the Black Lancers	1962	Yes				
Medusa Against the Son of Hercules	1963	Yes				
The Whip and the Body	1963	Yes	Yes	Yes	Assistant director	
Hercules and the Masked Rider	1963	Yes				
Terror in the Crypt	1964	Yes				
The Vampire of the Opera	1964	Yes	Yes			
The Long Hair of Death	1964		Yes			
Goliath at the Conquest of Damascus	1965	Yes				
The Possessed	1965	Yes			Uncredited	
Libido	1965	Yes		Yes	Director	
The Murder Clinic	1966	Yes	Yes			
Killer's Carnival	1966	Yes				
Arizona Colt	1966	Yes	Yes			
Blood at Sundown	1966	Yes	Yes			
Day of Anger	1967	Yes				
Flashman	1967	Yes	Yes			
The Sweet Body of Deborah	1968	Yes	Yes			
The Battle of El Alamein	1969	Yes				
So Sweet... So Perverse	1969	Yes				
The Price of Power	1969	Yes				
Arizona Colt Returns	1970		Yes			
Light the Fuse... Sartana Is Coming	1970	Yes				
All the Colors of the Dark	1972	Yes				
Death Walks at Midnight	1972	Yes				
The Grand Duel	1972	Yes				
Torso	1973	Yes				
The Violent Professionals	1973	Yes	Yes			
My Name Is Nobody	1973	Yes	Yes			
Almost Human	1974	Yes				
Gambling City	1975	Yes	Yes			
Kidnap Syndicate	1975	Yes				
Savage Three	1975	Yes	Yes	Yes	Treatment	
The Suspicious Death of a Minor	1975	Yes	Yes			
A Genius, Two Partners and a Dupe	1975	Yes	Yes			
The Cynic, the Rat and the Fist	1977	Yes				
Sahara Cross	1977	Yes				
Concorde Affaire '79	1979	Yes				
The Scorpion with Two Tails	1982	Yes	Yes			
Notturno con grida	1982	Yes	Yes	Yes	Director	
Once Upon a Time in America	1984	Yes			Uncredited	
Shatterer	1987	Yes				

== Footnotes ==
=== References ===
- Curti, Roberto (2013). Italian Crime Filmography, 1968-1980. McFarland. ISBN 978-0786469765.
- Curti, Roberto (2015). Italian Gothic Horror Films, 1957–1969. McFarland. ISBN 978-1-4766-1989-7.
- Curti, Roberto (2016a). Diabolika: Supercriminals, Superheroes and the Comic Book Universe in Italian Cinema. Midnight Marquee Press. ISBN 978-1-936168-60-6.
- Curti, Roberto (2016b). Tonino Valerii: The Films. McFarland. ISBN 978-1476664682.
- Curti, Roberto (2017a). Italian Gothic Horror Films, 1970-1979. McFarland. ISBN 978-1476629605.
- Curti, Roberto (2017b). Riccardo Freda: The Life and Works of a Born Filmmaker. McFarland. ISBN 978-1476628387.
- Curti, Roberto (2019). Italian Gothic Horror Films, 1980-1989. McFarland. ISBN 978-1476672434.
- Ehrenreich, Andreas (2018). "The Production of The Possessed". The Possessed (booklet). Arrow Video. FCD1850 / AV183.
- Galbraith IV, Stuart (2008). The Toho Studios Story: A History and Complete Filmography. Scarecrow Press. ISBN 978-1461673743.
- Gastaldi, Ernesto (2017). "Foreword by Ernesto Gastaldi". Italian Gothic Horror Films, 1970-1979. McFarland. ISBN 978-1476629605.
- Grant, Kevin (2011). Any Gun Can Play. Fab Press. ISBN 9781903254615.
- Howarth, Troy (2015). So Deadly, So Perverse: 50 Years of Italian Giallo Films. Midnight Marquee Press, Inc. ISBN 978-1936168507.
- Kinnard, Roy; Crnkovich, Tony (2017). Italian Sword and Sandal Films, 1908-1990. McFarland. ISBN 978-1476662916.
- Lucas, Tim (2013). Mario Bava - All the Colors of the Dark. ISBN 978-0-9633756-1-2.
- Sconce, Jeffrey, ed. (2007). Sleze Artists: Cinema at the Margins of Taste, Style, and Politics. Duke University Press. ISBN 978-0822390190.
