= Susanna Javicoli =

Italian actress (1954–2005)

- Born: 7 August 1954; Rome, Italy
- Died: 17 June 2005 (aged 50); Rome, Italy
- Occupations: Actress; voice actress; dialogue writer; dubbing director
- Years active: 1974–2005

Susanna Javicoli (7 August 1954 – 17 June 2005) was an Italian actress and voice actress.

== Biography ==
Javicoli began her career as an actress in the 1970s. Some of her earlier works include starring in TV films which were adapted by plays written by William Shakespeare. Her film debut was in La nottata starring Sara Sperati. As a diplomat of the Silvio D'Amico National Academy of Dramatic Arts, Javicoli often made collaborations with many theatre directors such as Mario Missiroli and Carlo Cecchi.

As a voice actress, Javicoli dubbed Michelle Pfeiffer, Bonnie Bedelia, Elizabeth Perkins, Miranda Richardson, Holly Hunter and Melanie Griffith in some of their films. Her most famous dubbing role was providing the Italian voice of Darling in the 1997 redub of Lady and the Tramp and in Lady and the Tramp II: Scamp's Adventure.

== Death ==
On 17 June 2005, Javicoli died after suffering from terminal kidney cancer. She was less than two months away from reaching her 51st birthday.

== Filmography ==
=== Cinema ===
- La nottata (1974) - Angela
- Private Vices, Public Pleasures (1976)
- Suspiria (1977) - Sonia
- Armaguedon (1977) - Gabriella
- Pigs Have Wings (1977) - Carla
- Ecce bombo (1978) - Silvia
- The Days Are Numbered (1979)
- Action (1980) - Doris / Ofelia
- Canto d'amore (1982)
- Monitors (1985) - Susanna
- Blu cobalto (1985)
- Non più di uno (1989)
- Body Puzzle (1992) - Mrs. Consorti
- When a Man Loves a Woman (2000) - Adriana
- The Last Kiss (2001) - Luisa

== Dubbing roles ==
=== Animation ===
- Darling in Lady and the Tramp (1997 redub)
- Darling in Lady and the Tramp II: Scamp's Adventure

=== Live action ===
- Madame Marie de Tourvel in Dangerous Liaisons
- Susie Diamond in The Fabulous Baker Boys
- Holly Gennero-McClane in Die Hard
- Susan Lawrence in Big
- Ed McDunnough in Raising Arizona
- Carolyn Stilton in Kansas City
- Tess McGill in Working Girl
- Diana Roth in A World Apart
- Juana in Kika
- Mrs. Utley in P.U.N.K.S.
- Dorothy Silk in The Human Stain
- Audrey in Little Shop of Horrors
- Leslie in Marked for Death
- Lina Bingham in It's My Party
