= I figli di nessuno =

I figli di nessuno may refer to:

- Nobody's Children (1951 film) (Italian:I figli di nessuno), a French-Italian melodrama film
- I figli di nessuno (1974 film), an Italian drama film
