= Action (1980 film) =

- Directed by: Tinto Brass
- Written by: Tinto Brass; Gian Carlo Fusco; Roberto Lerici; Vincenzo Siniscalchi
- Story by: Tinto Brass
- Produced by: Ars Cinematografica
- Starring: Luc Merenda
- Cinematography: Silvano Ippoliti
- Edited by: Tinto Brass
- Music by: Riccardo Giovannini; Blue Malbeix Band
- Distributed by: Cidif
- Release date: 4 January 1980
- Running time: 121 mins
- Country: Italy
- Language: Italian
- Budget: $100,000

Action is a 1980 Italian black comedy directed by Tinto Brass. The film is reminiscent of the director's earlier avant-garde low-budget works such as The Howl and Nerosubianco.

Brass faced many difficulties in Italy due to lawsuits concerning the production of Caligula, so he filmed Action in London in 1979.

In the film, an actor with hero syndrome has a nervous breakdown. He flees the town with an actress obsessed with the role of Ophelia, but they end up locked at a mental asylum. Following the suicide of "Ophelia", the actor flees the asylum with an anarchist patient.

== Plot ==
Bruno Martel (Luc Merenda) is a "Z movie" actor with hero syndrome, often quarrelling with directors. He meets Doris (Susanna Javicoli) an actress who is obsessed with Ophelia but cannot get any Shakespearean bookings.

One day, during a nervous breakdown, Bruno "rescues" Doris from the set, leaving the town to encounter various absurd situations. They meet an old anarchist (Alberto Sorrentino) who thinks he is Giuseppe Garibaldi and the three are locked at a mental asylum where Doris commits suicide. Bruno and "Garibaldi" escape and take refuge at an awkward petrol station run by Florence (Adriana Asti) and her invalid husband Joe (Alberto Lupo).

== Cast ==
- Luc Merenda: Bruno Martel
- Adriana Asti: Florence
- Susanna Javicoli: Doris / Ofelia
- Paola Senatore: Ann Shimpton
- Alberto Sorrentino: Garibaldi
- Alberto Lupo: Joe
- John Steiner: the manager
- Franco Fabrizi: the producer
- Tinto Brass: the director (cameo)
- Gianfranco Bullo: the director
- Giancarlo Badessi
- Edoardo Florio
- Luciano Crovato
- Paola Montenero: leader of the thugs
- Alina De Simone
- Beatrice Brass
- Hélène Chauvin
- Gigi D'Ecclesia
- Eolo Capritti

== Release ==
In Germany, the film was released as Sodom 2000.

== Reception ==
According to Italian film critic Marco Giusti, Action is for many the cult film among Tinto Brass' films. Giusti praises the finale with the dream of Luc Merenda, who sees four knights who have sexes in place of their noses and four women who have sexes in place of their mouthes.

== Bibliography ==
- Giusti, Marco (1999). dizionario dei film italiani STRACULT [sic]. Cles: Sterling & Kupfer. ISBN 88-200-2919-7.
