= Avec Amour =

Avec Amour (French "With Love") may refer to:

- Avec Amour (Anna Prucnal album), 1981
- Avec Amour (Azalia Snail album), 2005
- Avec Amour, a 2012 box set by Serge Gainsbourg
