= The Suspicious Death of a Minor =

1975 film

- Directed by: Sergio Martino
- Screenplay by: Ernesto Gastaldi; Sergio Martino
- Story by: Ernesto Gastaldi
- Produced by: Luciano Martino
- Starring: Claudio Cassinelli; Mel Ferrer; Jenny Tamburi; Massimo Girotti
- Cinematography: Giancarlo Ferrando
- Edited by: Raimondo Crociani
- Music by: Luciano Michelini
- Production company: Dania Film
- Distributed by: Titanus
- Release date: 12 August 1975 (Italy)
- Running time: 100 minutes
- Country: Italy
- Box office: ₤507.396 million

The Suspicious Death of a Minor (Italian: Morte sospetta di una minorenne), also known as Too Young to Die, is a 1975 Italian giallo film directed by Sergio Martino.

== Plot summary ==
Undercover cop Paolo Germi and the mysterious Marisa meet each other at a dance hall. Germi is unaware of the secret Marisa carries with her; conditions in her life have forced her into underage prostitution. After she is brutally murdered, he decides to go after her killers. However, a killer-for-hire ensures that Germi's investigation will not be easy, while continuing to kill.

== Cast ==
- Claudio Cassinelli as Paolo Germi
- Mel Ferrer as Police Superintendent
- Lia Tanzi as Carmela
- Gianfranco Barra as Teti
- Patrizia Castaldi as Marisa
- Adolfo Caruso as Giannino
- Jenny Tamburi as Gloria
- Massimo Girotti as Gaudenzio Pesce
- Carlo Alighiero as Chief of S.M.C.D. Office
- Franco Alpestre as Il Menga
- Fiammetta Baralla as Landlady
- Barbara Magnolfi as Floriana
- Aldo Massasso as Listri
- Roberto Posse as Killer
- Carlotta Wittig as Director of S.M.C.D.

== Production ==
The Suspicious Death of a Minor was developed under the title Milano Violenta (transl. Violent Milan), a title later used for Mario Caiano's film Bloody Payroll. The film was a hybrid of a crime film and a giallo. The screenwriter, Ernesto Gastaldi, later spoke about the film stating "In my opinion, it's a minor film [...] the usually very good Martino didn't manage to give the film a decisive shot-in-the-arm."

== Release ==
The Suspicious Death of a Minor was distributed theatrically by Titanus in Italy on 12 August 1975. The film grossed a total of 507,396,250 Italian lire on its domestic release.

== Notes ==
=== References ===
- Curti, Roberto (2013). Italian Crime Filmography, 1968-1980. McFarland. ISBN 978-0786469765.
