= Claudio Cassinelli =

Italian actor (1938–1985)

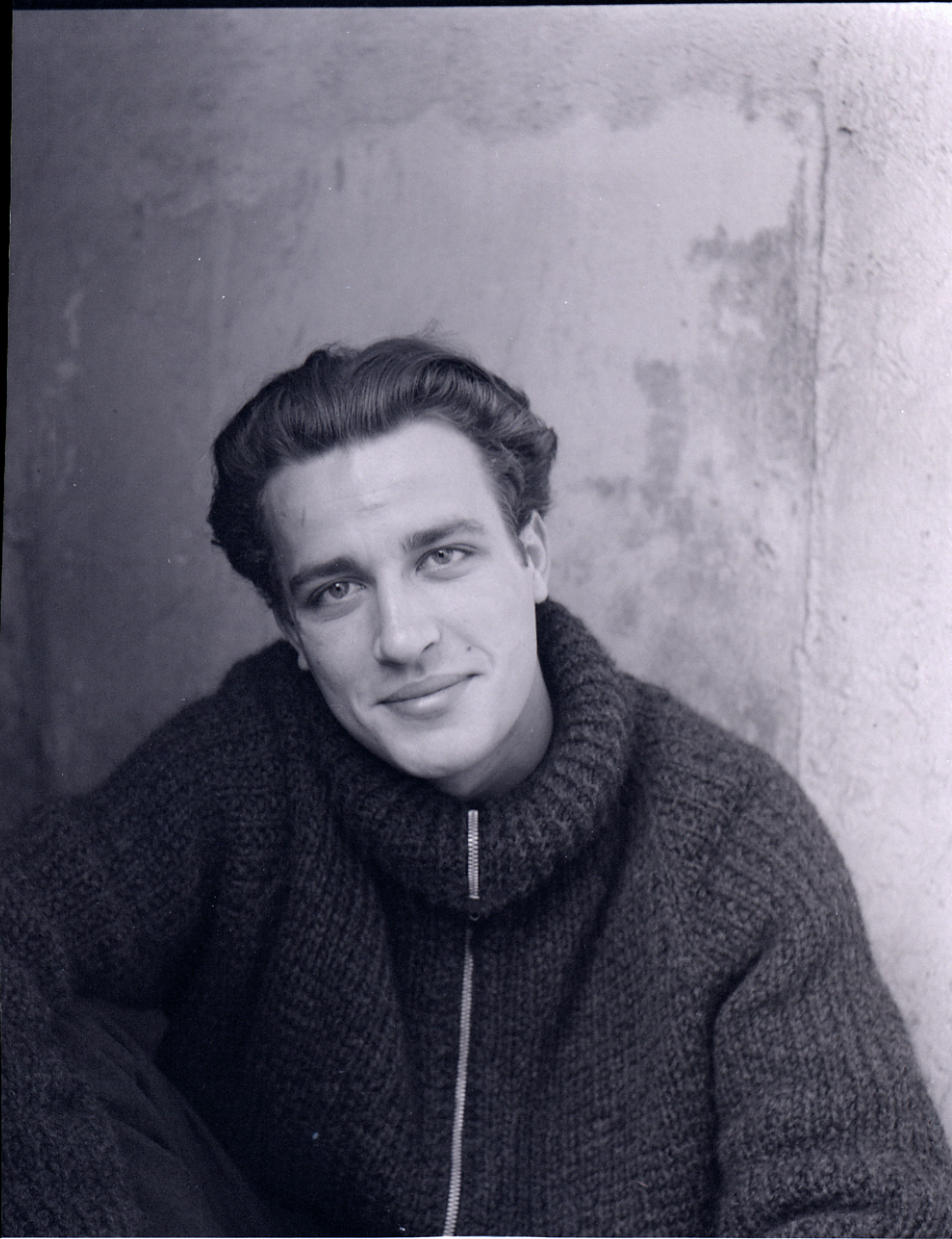
- Cassinelli portraying Paolo Monti in 1965
- Born: 13 September 1938; Bologna, Italy
- Died: 13 July 1985 (aged 46); Page, Arizona, United States
- Occupation: actor

Claudio Cassinelli (13 September 1938 – 13 July 1985) was an Italian film, stage and television actor.

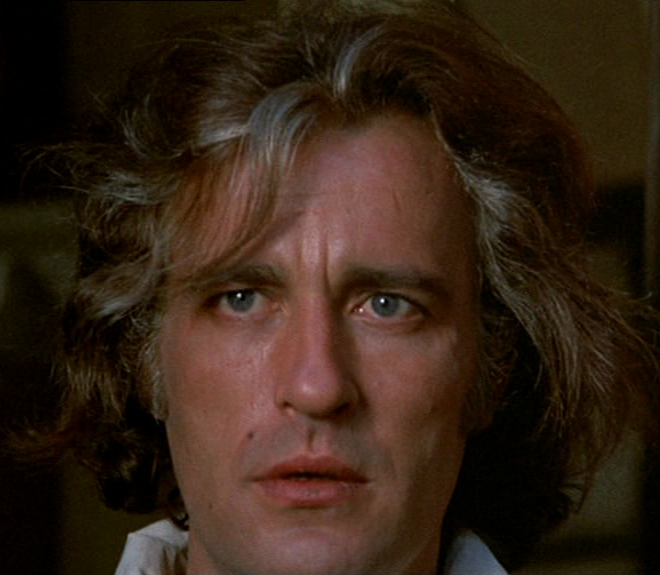
Cassinelli in Allonsanfàn (1974)

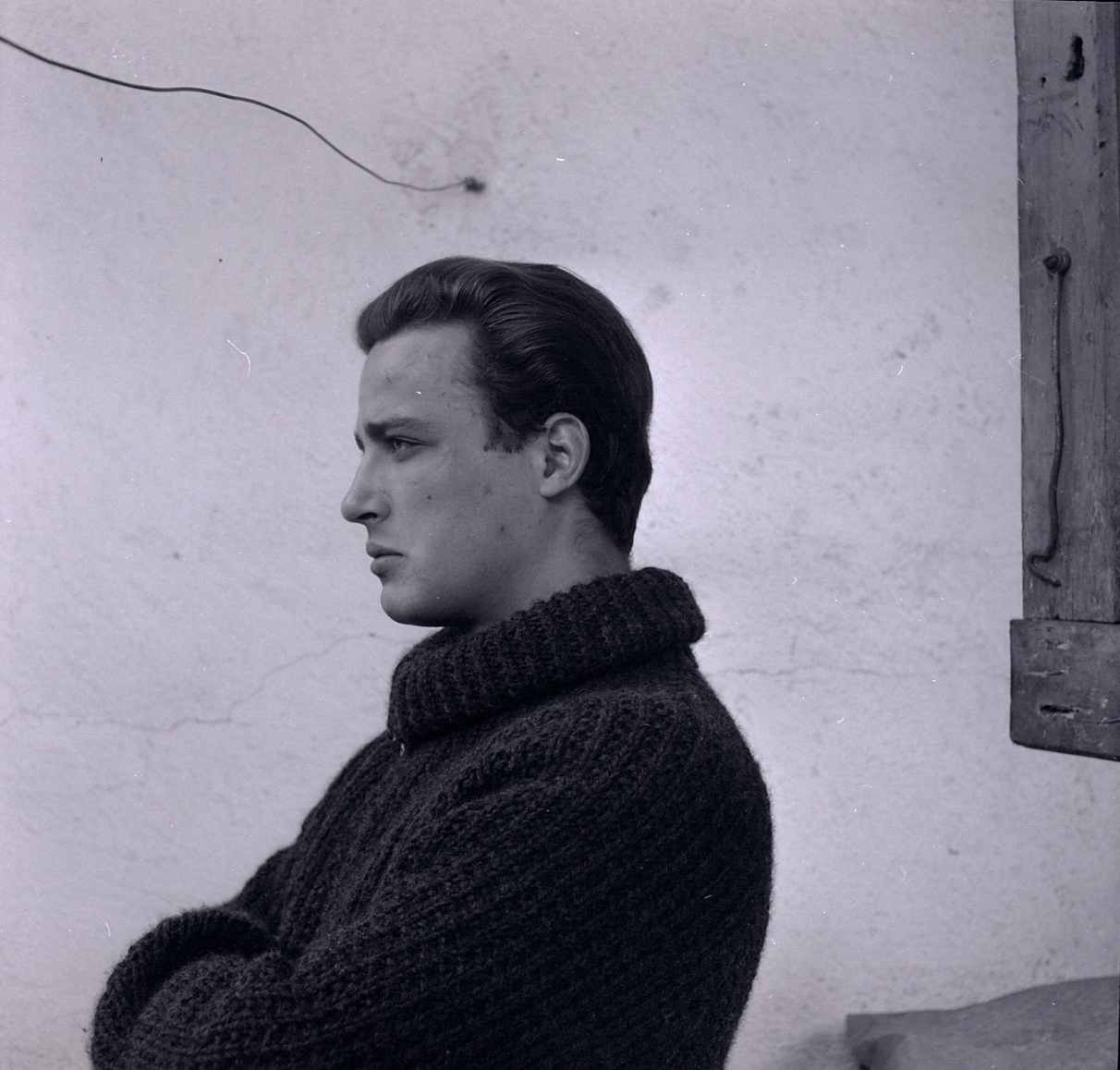
Cassinelli portraying Paolo Monti in 1965 (Fondo Paolo Monti, BEIC)

== Life and career ==
Born in Bologna to Giuseppina Tafani and Antonio Cassinelli, a well known opera singer, he had two sisters, Paola Cristina and Loretta. Cassinelli began his career in theater, later dedicating himself to film and television work. His film career is divided equally between auteur films (with, among others, Paolo and Vittorio Taviani, Liliana Cavani, Pasquale Festa Campanile, Damiano Damiani) and genre films, especially poliziotteschi and action films.

Cassinelli died in Page, Arizona during the filming of a scene in Sergio Martino's Vendetta dal futuro. He was on a helicopter that crashed into the Navajo Bridge due to pilot error. He was 46 and left three children: Sebastiano, Filippo and Giovanni.

== Selected filmography ==
- China Is Near (1967) - Furio
- Galileo (1968)
- The Devil Is a Woman (1973) - Rodolfo Solina
- Flavia the Heretic (1974) - Abraham
- What Have They Done to Your Daughters? (1974) - Insp. Silvestri
- Allonsanfàn (1974) - Lionello
- La nottata (1975) - Davide
- Killer Cop (1975) - Commissario Matteo Rolandi
- The First Time on the Grass (1975) - Hans
- The Suspicious Death of a Minor (1975) - Paolo Germi
- Free Hand for a Tough Cop (1976) - Antonio Sarti
- A Matter of Time (1976) - (uncredited)
- Bloody Payroll (1976) - Raul Montalbani
- Blood and Diamonds (1977) - Guido Mauri
- Slave of the Cannibal God (1978) - Manolo
- Island of the Fishmen (1979) - Lt. Claude de Ross
- Avalanche Express (1979) - Col. Molinari
- The Great Alligator River (1979) - Daniel Nessel
- The Good Thief (1980) - Jesus
- Lion of the Desert (1980) - Prisoner Escort Guard (uncredited)
- Roma dalla finestra (1982) - Carlo
- Grog (1982) - Commissario
- Scorpion with Two Tails (1982) - Paolo Domelli
- Notturno (1983) - The Contacter
- Hercules (1983) - Zeus
- Unguided Tour (1983)
- Warriors of the Year 2072 (1984) - Cortez
- Murder Rock (1984) - Dick Gibson
- The Adventures of Hercules (1985) - Zeus
- Vendetta dal futuro (1986) - Peter Howell
