= La nottata =

- Film poster
- Directed by: Tonino Cervi
- Starring: Sara Sperati; Susanna Javicoli; Giancarlo Prete; Giorgio Albertazzi; Martine Brochard; Claudio Cassinelli; Giuliana Calandra
- Release date: 1974
- Running time: 95 minutes
- Country: Italy
- Language: Italian

La nottata (lit. 'The big night') is a 1974 Italian film directed by Tonino Cervi.

== Plot ==
The film is set in Milan, where Susy and Angela meet in a club bathroom. There, they take possession of a ring forgotten by a lady. After going to movie, they meet Vito, a taxi-driver who promises to help them selling the ring. The search for a buyer begins at a fence's house and continues until a party at the house of Destino, a travesti, where a jeweler buys the ring at a fraudulent price that the trio are forced to pay. But, after going out and loading a "life boy" (ragazzo di vita) in the car, they realize that the money is gone.

Despite this setback, the evening continues and, after a meeting with Marta and Davide, a rich vicious couple who involve them in erotic games, the two girls fight, to the disappointment of Susy who seems not to accept the greatest success of Angela with men. At this moment the three separate: Angela spends a disappointing night with Piero, a young boy met in the villa of the vicious couple, while Susy goes to the station to leave Milan. In the morning the two girls meet again and after confessing that Angela took the money that seemed to have disappeared and Susy managed to steal the ring from the jeweler, they become friends.

== Cast ==
- Sara Sperati: Susy
- Susanna Javicoli: Angela
- Giancarlo Prete: Vito, taxi-driver
- Max Delys: Piero
- Giorgio Albertazzi: Destino
- Martine Brochard: Marta
- Claudio Cassinelli: Davide
- Raoul Casadei: himself
- Giuliana Calandra: the owner of the ring
- Riccardo Berlingieri
- Aldo Bonamano
- Emilio Lo Curcio
- Francesco Bagagli
- Elisa Mainardi
- Delio Cioni
- Luciana Passin
- Angelo Pellegrino: the fence
- Benedetto Simonelli
- Gino Uras
- Gabriele Villa
