= Werewolf Woman =

- Theatrical release poster
- Directed by: Rino Di Silvestro
- Screenplay by: Rino Di Silvestro
- Story by: Rino Di Silvestro
- Produced by: Diego Alchimede
- Starring: Annik Borel; Howard Ross; Dagmar Lassander; Tino Carraro; Elio Zamuto
- Cinematography: Mario Capriotti
- Edited by: Angelo Curi
- Music by: Coriolano Gori
- Production company: Dialchi Film
- Distributed by: Agorà
- Release date: 18 March 1976 (Italy)
- Running time: 100 minutes
- Country: Italy
- Box office: ₤389.164 million

Werewolf Woman (Italian: La lupa mannara), also known as The Legend of the Wolf Woman, is a 1976 Italian horror film directed by Rino Di Silvestro.

== Plot ==
When Daniella Neseri was a child, she was raped. The trauma from this has stunted her emotional growth and sexuality, so much so that she cannot have normal romantic relationships with men. One day she discovers that one of her female ancestors was killed for purportedly being a werewolf and that she strongly resembles this woman. This causes her to have nightmares where she transforms into a werewolf and is chased by angry villagers. Eventually, this delusion surfaces in her daily life, and as a result, she murders her sister Elena's lover after watching the two make love. Daniella hides the murder by throwing the body over a cliff, meant to give the impression that he was attacked by a dog and accidentally fell.

Daniella is discovered unresponsive near the cliff and is institutionalized. Her family and physicians believe that she merely discovered the body, and the shock was too much for her. Her personality flickers between calm and violent, and eventually, Daniella manages to escape the institution after murdering a fellow patient who made sexual advances to her. While on the run, she murders a man who tried to rape her, and she is found by Luca, a handsome stuntman living in a movie set for Western films. Meanwhile, both detectives and her family are searching for her, as they now believe that she is responsible for all of the murders that have happened thus far.

Daniella falls in love with Luca due to his care and gentleness, even managing to overcome her urge to murder. Believing herself cured of her mental illness, Daniella spends a happy month with Luca and is able to have a seemingly stable sexual relationship with him. This ends after another person living in the same movie set breaks into Luca's home with two of his friends and take turns violently raping Daniella. They also murder Luca when he returns home, shattering what is left of Daniella's sanity. She follows them to their homes and jobs, murdering them out of revenge. The police discover her living in the forest where her ancestor was killed, fully believing herself to be a werewolf. She is captured and institutionalized, where she dies. Her father also commits suicide, leaving her sister as the only living Neseri.

== Cast ==
- Annik Borel as Daniella Neseri
- Howard Ross as Luca Mondini
- Dagmar Lassander as Elena Neseri
- Tino Carraro as Count Neseri
- Elio Zamuto as Psychiatrist
- Andrea Scotti as Arrighi
- Frederick Stafford as Inspector Modica
- Felicita Fanny as Doctor in car
- Salvatore Billa as Rapist
- Pietro Torrisi as Rapist

== Production ==
Filming for Werewolf Woman began in September 1975 in Rome. Initially, the film was known as La licantropa. Director Di Silvestro emphasized in interview that he was trying to make a "serious" film about lycanthropy. Di Silvestro also claimed the film to be the first focused on a werewolf woman, which is untrue as the theme had been explored as early as The Werewolf in 1913.

Annik Borel was cast as the werewolf, Daniella Neseri. Di Silvestro recalled seeing hundred of photos from international agents and when seeing Borel he realized "something was exploding within her, in her psychic and cultural background" Di Silvestro stated he gave her several screen tests which he described as "almost devastating" before casting her.

== Release ==
Werewolf Woman was distributed theatrically in Italy by Agorà on 18 March 1976. The film grossed a total of 389,164,094 Italian lire domestically.

The film was distributed abroad in the United States, Canada and Australia. The director believed his films had an "international feel about them–they were understandable even without dialogue or music, just by watching the images" The film was released in the United States in June 1977 where it was distributed by Dimension Pictures. It has been released in the United States as Daughter of a Werewolf, Naked Werewolf Woman, She-Wolf and Terror of the She Wolf. It was released in Australia as Legend of the Wolf Woman.

== Reception ==
Italian film historian and critic Roberto Curti described the film's reception in Italy as being "predictably ridiculed by critics". Tom Milne of the Monthly Film Bulletin reviewed a 98-minute dubbed version of the film in 1980. Milne described the film as a "random concoction of horror, exploitation, policier and psychological trash-bucket incredibly stilted in all departments." Milne specifically noted the romance in the film, finding it "all soft-focus, rompings on the beach, which heralds the 'cure' for lycanthropy".

In a retrospective review, Curti described the film as an "over-the-top sexploitation potboiler" and found that the film was "not technically [as] poor as those by some of his peers". Curto also called Di Silvestro's work "naive" with heavy-handed symbolism and too many close-ups, zooms and camera angles resulting in the film looking "unintentionally ridiculous".
