= Lunatics and Lovers =

1976 film

- Film poster
- Directed by: Flavio Mogherini
- Written by: Maurizio Costanzo
- Starring: Marcello Mastroianni; Claudia Mori; Lino Toffolo
- Cinematography: Carlo Carlini
- Music by: Detto Mariano
- Release date: 1976
- Running time: 110 minutes
- Country: Italy
- Language: Italian

Lunatics and Lovers (Italian: Culastrisce nobile veneziano) is a 1976 Italian comedy film directed by Flavio Mogherini.

== Cast ==
- Marcello Mastroianni as Marquis Luca Maria
- Lino Toffolo as Agostino
- Claudia Mori as Luca Maria's wife
- Adriano Celentano as Sprint Boss
- Flora Carabella as Aunt Luisa
- Anna Miserocchi as Helga
- Olga Bisera as Ivana, the Barman
- Andrea Aureli as The Deputy

== See also ==
- List of Italian films of 1976
