= Yuppi du =

1975 film

- Film poster
- Directed by: Adriano Celentano
- Written by: Adriano Celentano; Alberto Silvestri
- Starring: Adriano Celentano; Charlotte Rampling; Claudia Mori
- Cinematography: Alfio Contini
- Edited by: Adriano Celentano
- Music by: Adriano Celentano
- Release date: 1975
- Running time: 120 minutes
- Country: Italy
- Language: Italian

Yuppi du is a 1975 Italian comedy film directed by Adriano Celentano. It is the second film directed by Celentano following Super rapina a Milano in 1964.

The film premiered at the 1975 Cannes Film Festival and won the Nastro d'Argento award for Best Film Score in 1976.

== Background ==
The film can be described as a cross between a musical and a fairytale for adults.

== Plot ==
The story revolves around Felice Pietà, a man of modest means who resides with his second wife, Adelaide. Together, they raise Monica, Felice's daughter from his first wife, Silvia, who took her own life years ago under mysterious circumstances.

Haunted by Silvia's absence, Felice decides to visit the place where she ended her life one final time. To his astonishment, Silvia reappears and reveals that she faked her suicide because she grew weary of living in poverty with Felice in Venice. Silvia discloses her intention to return since she missed her life with him. Consequently, Felice leaves Adelaide to embark on a new chapter with his beloved Silvia.

Silvia departs for London to address matters with her current husband, and Felice suggests taking their daughter along. However, Silvia departs without actually returning. After a few months, Felice discovers their whereabouts and tracks them down in Milan, where Silvia's affluent husband emphasizes her desire to maintain the luxurious lifestyle she has become accustomed to while also seeking custody of Monica, despite the legal complexities. In this context, Felice, adopting a detached and market-driven approach, suggests selling Monica based on her weight. Silvia's husband attempts to negotiate the weight and eventually pays 45 million for the child. During the train journey back to Venice, Felice encounters a woman who bears an uncanny resemblance to Silvia. The silent exchange between them occurs through voiceovers. Felice responds to the woman's promise of eternal love and happiness by expressing his disbelief in love, understanding her true motives as merely an attempt to take away his money.

== Cast ==
- Adriano Celentano as Felice Della Pietà
- Charlotte Rampling as Silvia
- Gino Santercole as Napoleone
- Claudia Mori as Adelaide
- Lino Toffolo as Nane
- Sonia Viviani as Napoleone's girl
- Rosita Celentano as Monica
- Carla Brait as the maid
- Memo Dittongo as Scognamillo
- Jack La Cayenne as the mime
- John Lee
- Carla Mancini (credit only)
- Raffaele di Sipio as man in the toilet (uncredited)
- Pippo Starnazza as old man in Milan bar (uncredited)

== Curiosity ==
- The Italian singer-songwriter Mao graduated in History and Criticism of Cinema at the Faculty of Letters and Philosophy of the University of Turin in 2003 discussing a thesis on Yuppi du, under the supervision of Prof. Dario Tomasi. The thesis is reported in full in his music novel Olràit! Mao sogna Celentano e glile canta, published by Arcana Edizioni in 2013.
