= When Women Had Tails =

- Theatrical release poster
- Directed by: Pasquale Festa Campanile
- Written by: Marcello Coscia; Lina Wertmüller; Pasquale Festa Campanile
- Produced by: Silvio Clementelli
- Starring: Senta Berger; Giuliano Gemma; Lando Buzzanca
- Cinematography: Franco Di Giacomo
- Music by: Ennio Morricone
- Distributed by: Film Ventures International
- Release date: 1970
- Running time: 90 minutes
- Country: Italy
- Language: Italian

When Women Had Tails (Italian: Quando le Donne Avevano la Coda) is a 1970 Italian comedy film. Set in pre-historic times when “women had tails” and were hunted by cavemen, the film stars Giuliano Gemma, Senta Berger, and Lando Buzzanca. It was followed by When Women Lost Their Tails in 1972.

== Plot ==
Seven orphan cavemen grow up on a little island all by themselves. After a fire burns all the vegetation, they set out to find a new place to live. One day they trap a strange animal, looking very similar to them, only softer and with longer hair.

She, Filli (Senta Berger), is attracted to one of the brothers, Ulli (Giuliano Gemma), and convinces him that a certain kind of playing with each other is far more satisfying than just eating her.

== Cast ==
- Senta Berger as Filli
- Giuliano Gemma as Ulli
- Lando Buzzanca as Kao
- Frank Wolff as Grr
- Renzo Montagnani as Maluc
- Lino Toffolo as Put
- Francesco Mulé aa Uto
- Aldo Giuffrè as Zog
- Paola Borboni as leader of the tribe of cave women

== Home video release ==
It was released on VHS by Simitar Entertainment.

Oct. 9, 2020 Update: It was released on DVD in 2003 by Miracle Pictures a Division of PMC Corp. (and an October 9, 2020 internet search of "When Women Lost Their Tails (DVD 2003)" shows at least two different DVD cover art versions and one combination two movies on one DVD with "Blitz" as the second movie)
