= Beati i ricchi =

- Directed by: Salvatore Samperi
- Written by: Sandro Continenza; Aldo Lado; Salvatore Samperi
- Starring: Paolo Villaggio; Lino Toffolo
- Cinematography: Claudio Cirillo; Angelo Samperi
- Edited by: Franco Arcalli
- Music by: Luis Bacalov
- Distributed by: Millennium Storm
- Release date: 1972
- Running time: 113 minute
- Country: Italy
- Language: Italian

Beati i ricchi (Blessed Are the Rich) is a 1972 Italian comedy film written and directed by Salvatore Samperi.

== Cast ==
- Paolo Villaggio as Augusto
- Lino Toffolo as Geremia
- Sylva Koscina as the Countess
- Piero Vida as the Priest
- Eugene Walter as the Mayor
- Enzo Robutti as Bank Manager
- Gigi Ballista as the Commendatore
- Neda Arnerić as Miss Barti
- Enrica Bonaccorti as Adele
- Olga Bisera
