= Fiammetta Baralla =

Italian actress

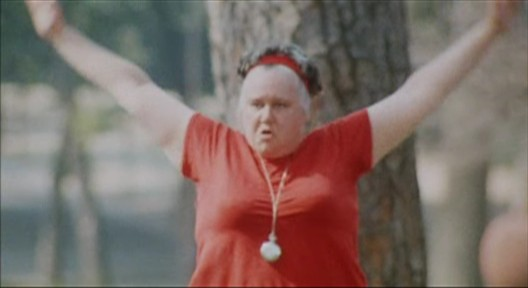
- Born: 2 May 1943; Rome, Italy
- Died: 7 September 2013 (aged 70); Rome, Italy
- Occupation: Actress
- Years active: 1958-2006

Fiammetta Baralla (2 May 1943 - 7 September 2013) was an Italian actress. She appeared in more than forty films from 1958 to 2006.

== Selected filmography ==
Year	Title	Role	Notes
1990	There Was a Castle with Forty Dogs		
1987	Da grande		
1986	Il ragazzo del Pony Express		
1986	7 chili in 7 giorni		
1984	Vediamoci chiaro		
1983	The Story of Piera		
1981	Fracchia la belva umana		
1981	Camera d'albergo		
1980	City of Women		
1977	The Virgo, the Taurus and the Capricorn		
1976	Sex with a Smile		
1976	Classe mista		
1975	The Suspicious Death of a Minor		
1972	When Women Lost Their Tails		
1971	Trastevere		
