= Lino Toffolo =

Italian actor, singer-songwriter and comedian

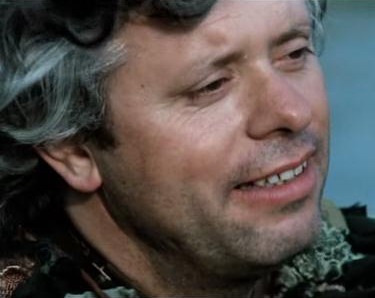
- Toffolo in the movie Yuppi du (1975)
- Born: Lino Toffolo Rossit; 31 December 1934; Venice, Italy
- Died: 16 May 2016 (aged 81); Venice, Italy
- Occupation: Actor
- Years active: 1950–2013
- Height: 1.68 m (5 ft 6 in)
- Spouse: Antonia (m. 1961)

Lino Toffolo (31 December 1934 – 16 May 2016) was an Italian actor, singer-songwriter, author, and television presenter.

== Life and career ==
Born in Murano, shortly after his debut Toffolo moved to Milan where he obtained his first successes at the Derby Club, performing the character of the drunkard who sang his songs in Venetian dialect. Toffolo made his film debut in 1968, in Chimera. He appeared in 24 titles between 1968 and 1978, including films by Dino Risi, Mario Monicelli, Salvatore Samperi, Pasquale Festa Campanile, then focused his works on stage and on television.

His variegated career includes three music albums and several singles, of which the most successful was "Johnny Bassotto", that in 1972 ranked second on the Italian Hit Parade. Toffolo even wrote two books, A Ramengo and A Gratis, and is the author of two theatrical plays, Gelati caldi and Fisimat.

== Selected filmography ==
- I Vitelloni (1953) - Un ragazzo al carnevale (uncredited)
- Chimera (1968) - Sammarco
- I quattro del pater noster (1969) - Paul
- When Women Had Tails (1970) - Put
- Brancaleone at the Crusades (1970) - Panigotto
- Million Dollar Eel (1971) - Giovanni Boscolo 'Bissa'
- Secret Fantasy (1971) - Cavalmoretti
- In Love, Every Pleasure Has Its Pain (1971) - Bazzarello
- When Women Lost Their Tails (1972) - Put
- Cause of Divorce (1972) - Vladimiro Pellegrini
- Beati i ricchi (1972) - Geremia
- Little Funny Guy (1973) - Italian anarchist
- Lovers and Other Relatives (1974) - Lino
- La bellissima estate (1974) - Red Baron
- Yuppi du (1975) - Nane
- The Sensuous Nurse (1975) - Giovanni Garbin
- Lunatics and Lovers (1976) - Gondrano Rossi
- Sturmtruppen (1976) - Una recluta
- The Career of a Chambermaid (1976) - Agostino
- Messalina, Messalina! (1977) - Giulio Nelio, the Man from Venice
- Scherzi da prete (1978) - Monsignor Cassola
- L'inquilina del piano di sopra (1978) - Arturo Canestrari
- One Day More (2011) - Fausto
