= Hanna D. - The Girl from Vondel Park =

- Film poster
- Directed by: Rino Di Silvestro; Bruno Mattei
- Screenplay by: Rino Di Silvestro; Hervé Piccini
- Starring: Ann-Gisel Glass; Donatella Damiani; Karin Schubert
- Cinematography: Franco Delli Colli
- Edited by: Bruno Mattei
- Music by: Luigi Ceccarelli
- Production companies: Beatrice Film; Les Films Jacques Leitienne
- Release date: 2 November 1984 (France)
- Countries: Italy; France

Hanna D. - The Girl from Vondel Park (Italian: Hanna D. - La ragazza del Vondel Park; French: À seize ans dans l'enfer d'Amsterdam) is a 1984 erotic drama film directed by Rino Di Silvestro. Bruno Mattei completed the film.

== Plot ==
Hanna is a poor girl abandoned to herself and forced to prostitute on the streets to obtain her drug fix from unscrupulous people like Miguel. But one day she meets Alex, who falls for her and helps her return to a normal life.

== Cast ==
- Ann-Gisel Glass as Hanna
- Tony Serrano as Miguel
- Sebastiano Somma as Alex
- Donatella Damiani
- Jacques Stany
- Georges Millon
- Fausto Lombardi
- Karin Schubert as Hanna's Mother

== Release ==
Hanna D. was released as Angel in the Dark on home video in Germany in October 1988.

== Reception ==
The film has been widely described as an Italian rip-off of the German film Christiane F. In the German Fischer film almanach from 1989, the review described the film as strictly based on "voyeurism" opposed to any enlightenment about the Hannah's plight.

== See also ==
- List of Italian films of 1984
- List of French films of 1984
