= What's Your Sign? (1975 film) =

1975 film

- Poster
- Italian: Di che segno sei?
- Directed by: Sergio Corbucci
- Written by: Mario Amendola; Castellano & Pipolo; Sabatino Ciuffini; Bruno Corbucci; Sergio Corbucci; Massimo Franciosa; Rodolfo Sonego; Alberto Sordi
- Produced by: Franco Cristaldi
- Starring: Alberto Sordi; Adriano Celentano; Mariangela Melato; Paolo Villaggio; Renato Pozzetto
- Cinematography: Claudio Cirillo
- Edited by: Eugenio Alabiso
- Music by: Lelio Luttazzi
- Distributed by: Vides Cinematografica
- Release date: 1975 (Italy)
- Running time: 127 minutes
- Country: Italy
- Language: Italian language

What's Your Sign? (Italian: Di che segno sei?) is a 1975 Italian anthology comedy film directed by Sergio Corbucci and starring Alberto Sordi.

== Plot ==
The film is divided into four episodes. In the first Paolo Villaggio plays the role of a sailor from Genoa who learns from his doctor that he will soon become a woman. He begins to make plans and to daydream of what it will be like to be a woman. In the second episode Adriano Celentano is a former dancer in Emilia Romagna who now trains a woman for boxing fights. When he meets a beautiful Emilian girl who is enrolling in a dance competition where a large sum of money will be awarded to the winners, Adriano does not miss the opportunity. He first tries to kill the boxer woman he works with, called "King Kong" and then leaves to go dancing with the girl, winning one turn after another. But as the couple wins the first prize Adriano is arrested by the police. In the third episode Renato Pozzetto plays the role of a poor mason from Milan who bets with some friends that he will be able to seduce the wife of his boss. Renato will succeed but will pay the consequences. In the last episode Alberto Sordi plays the role of hick Roman Nando Moriconi (same character of the film An American in Rome by Steno - 1954), this time he works as a body guard of a prominent Italian financier who has been the victim of many attempts to kidnap him .

== Cast ==
Segment Acqua

- Paolo Villaggio as Dante Bompazzi
- Giuliana Calandra as Maria Bompazzi
- Gino Pernice as the doctor
- Barbara Magnolfi as Giancarla
- Lello Bersani as the journalist
- Carmen Russo as the harassed girl
- Luca Sportelli as the husband at the nightclub

Segment Aria

- Adriano Celentano as Alfredo Astarita, aka Fred Astaire
- Mariangela Melato as Marietta, aka Claquette
- Jack La Cayenne as Enea Giacomazzi, aka Bolero
- Lilli Carati as Chewingum
- Angelo Pellegrino as Lorenzo
- Maria Antonietta Beluzzi as Maria Vincenzoni, aka King Kong
- Raoul Casadei as the dance competition presenter
- Claudio Ruffini as the boxer

Segment Terra

- Renato Pozzetto as Basilio
- Giovanna Ralli as Cristina
- Luciano Salce as Count Leonardo Bronzi Ballarin
- Massimo Boldi as Massimo

Segment Fuoco

- Alberto Sordi as Nando Moriconi
- Ugo Bologna as Commendatore Ubaldo Bravetta
- Marilda Donà as Carolina
- Marcello Di Falco as Cosimo
- Shirley Corrigan as Shirla
