= Anna Prucnal =

Polish actress (born 1940)

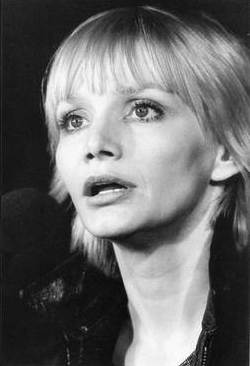
- Born: 17 December 1940 (age 85); Warsaw, Poland

Anna Magdalena Prucnal-Michaud (born 17 December 1940) is a Polish actress and singer who worked in film and theatre.

== Life ==
Prucnal was born in Warsaw, Poland. After her father, a surgeon, was killed by the Germans during World War II, Anna and her sister were raised by their mother, who was of noble descent and related to the 18th-century King of Poland Stanisław Leszczyński. After studying piano and lyrical song, Anna Prucnal went on an acting career at the Studencki Teatr Satyryków, in Warsaw.

Prucnal first appeared in a movie at the age of twenty-two in the film “Sun and Shadow” (Slăntzeto i siankata), a popular release. In 1970, Prucnal moved to France and embarked upon a theatrical career, appearing in a number of plays by Bertolt Brecht. She worked with many important directors including Jorge Lavelli, Georges Wilson, Roger Planchon, Jean-Louis Barrault, Marc’O, Petrika Ionesco, Lucian Pintilie, Federico Fellini and Jacques Lassalle. She appeared in several notable films, the most notorious of which was Dusan Makavejev's Sweet Movie, which Polish authorities deemed to be pornographic and anticommunist. As a result, she was banned from using her Polish passport, effectively exiling her from her homeland.

During the 1970s, Anna developed her career as a singer. Her album “Dream of West, Dream of East” was popular, initially in France, then Belgium, worldwide and, finally, in Warsaw in 1989, as part of the celebration of the bicentenary of the French Revolution, and representing a homecoming of sorts for her.

Prucnal has continued to release records (such as “Monsieur Brecht” in 2006), and act in movies (“Wimbledon Stage” in 2001) and TV, as well as appearing on stage in the acclaimed play “The Vagina Monologues” in 2005.

In 2002, Prucnal published her autobiography (not yet translated in English) entitled “Moi qui suis née à Varsovie” (“I, who was born in Warsaw”), co-authored with Jean Mailland.

== Filmography ==
- 1962 : Sun and Shadow (Original title: Слънцето и сянката or Slăntzeto i siankata)
- 1963 : Teenager (Original title: Smarkula)
- 1963 : New year eve adventure (Original title: Przygoda noworoczna)
- 1964 : The Flying Dutchman (Original title: Le Hollandais volant)
- 1966 : Reise ins Ehebett
- 1970 : Nowy
- 1970 : Unterwegs zu Lenin
- 1970 : Der Sekretär
- 1972 : Hellé
- 1974 : Sweet Movie
- 1976 : Dracula père et fils
- 1976 : Guerres civiles en France - premier empire - La semaine sanglante
- 1978 : Le Dossier 51
- 1979 : Bastien, Bastienne
- 1979 : Mais où et donc Ornicar
- 1980 : La città delle donne
- 1981 : Neige
- 1981 : L'Ogre de barbarie
- 1983 : L'Homme qui aimait deux femmes
- 1989 : Un amour tardif
- 1993 : Lepiej być piękną i bogatą (Better to be pretty and rich)
- 1993 : Au port de la lune
- 1994 : Crows (Wrony)
- 1997 : C'est la tangente que je préfère
- 2002 : Le Stade de Wimbledon
- 2005 : Slogans pour 343 actrices

== Discography ==
- 1967 : Letkiss-Boy
- 1967 : Träume sind so wunderschön
- 1979 : Félicité
- 1979 : L'Été
- 1980 : Théâtre de la ville
- 1981 : Avec Amour
- 1982 : Loin de Pologne
- 1984 : L'âge de cœur
- 1987 : Rêve d'ouest, rêve d'est
- 1987 : Ivre vive - Luna moon
- 1988 : Concert 88
- 1993 : Monsieur Brecht
- 1993 : C'était à Babelsberg
- 1995 : Dédicaces
- 1995 : L'intégrale
- 1996 : Rêve d'Ouest - Rêve d'Est
- 1998 : Anna Prucnal chante Vertynski
- 1999 : Les années fatales
- 2001 : Le Cirque de Giuseppe
- 2002 : Je vous aime
- 2006 : Monsieur Brecht
- 2006 : Rêve d'ouest - Rêve d'est

== Television ==
- 1968 : Przekładaniec, by Andrzej Wajda
- 1968 : Wege übers Land, by Martin Eckermann
- 1974 : The Festival with Spitz, by Edouard Luntz
- 1974 : A Young Man Alone, by Jean Mailland
- 1976 : Nick Verlaine or How to steal the Tower Eiffel, by Claude Boissol
- 1979 : Quincailler of Meaux, by Pierre Lary
- 1981 : War in neutral country, by Philippe Lefèbvre
- 1982 : Anna Prucnal, dream of west-dream of east, by Jean Mailland
- 1982 : The Ogre of cruelty, Pierre Matteuzzi
- 1986 : The Laughter of Caïn, Marcel Moussy
- 1988 : Toâ realized, by Yves-André Hubert
- 1988 : A madness, by Alain Dhenault
- 1989 : Anna Prucnal, until new order, by Jean Mailland
- 1990 : Silesia, letter with two votes, by Jean Mailland

== Theatre ==
- 1971 : Small Mahagonny, Bertolt Brecht
- 1971 : The Parisian life, Jacques Offenbach
- 1972 : Seven deadly sins, Bertolt Brecht and Kurt Weill
- 1972 : Gave Mobil, Claude Prey
- 1973 : Rock bottom, Marc’ O
- 1973 : The Four binoculars, Copi
- 1974 : Ubu with the opera, Alfred Jarry
- 1975 : A.A. theaters of Adamov, Roger Planchon
- 1975 : Middle-class Madnesses, Roger Planchon
- 1975 : The Man occis, Claude Prey
- 1975 : Nights of Paris
- 1976 : The French Grandmother, by Eugène Ionesco'
- 1977 : Jacques or the tender and the future in the eggs, by Eugène Ionesco'
- 1977 : Domestic industry, F.K. Kroetz, Jacques Lassalle
- 1978 : Remagen, Anna Seghers, by Jacques Lassalle
- 1978 : Kabaret, Jean Mailland
- 1984 : The Beautiful Helene, Jacques Offenbach
- 1984 : The human Voice, Jean Cocteau and Francis Poulenc
- 1986 : Ghetto, Josual Sobol
- 1987 : Connected, Eugene O’ Neill
- 1988 : Awakes Philadelphia, François Billetdoux
- 1990 : The Opera of quat’ under, Bertolt Brecht and Kurt Weill
- 1991 : The Room, Wilhelm de Tove Ditlevsen
- 1992 : Mr Brecht, according to Bertolt Brecht
- 1993 : The human Voice, Jean Cocteau and Francis Poulenc
- 1994 : The following days which sing false, Josual Sobol
- 1996 : Gernika 1937, a lyric review, of Jean Mailland'
- 1999 : The Circus of Giuseppe, Jean-Louis Bauer and Piotr Moss
- 2000 : Song of the swan and other stories, Anton Tchekhov'
- 2002 : The Foreigner of the city, Bernard Martin
- 2003 : Red Evil and gold, Jean Cocteau
- 2004 : Anna Prucnal and Jean Cocteau
- 2005 : The Vagina Monologues, by Eve Ensler
