= City of Women =

1980 film by Federico Fellini

- Theatrical release poster
- Italian: La città delle donne
- Directed by: Federico Fellini
- Screenplay by: Federico Fellini; Bernardino Zapponi; Brunello Rondi (Note: Collaboration)
- Story by: Federico Fellini; Bernardino Zapponi
- Produced by: Franco Rossellini; Renzo Rossellini; Daniel Toscan du Plantier
- Starring: Marcello Mastroianni; Anna Prucnal; Bernice Stegers; Donatella Damiani; Iole Silvani; Ettore Manni
- Cinematography: Giuseppe Rotunno
- Edited by: Ruggero Mastroianni
- Music by: Luis Bacalov
- Production companies: Opera Film Produzione; Gaumont
- Distributed by: Gaumont Italia (Italy); Gaumont Distribution (France)
- Release dates: 28 March 1980 (Italy); 5 November 1980 (France)
- Running time: 139 minutes
- Countries: Italy; France
- Language: Italian

City of Women (Italian: La città delle donne) is a 1980 fantasy comedy-drama film directed by Federico Fellini, who co-wrote it with Bernardino Zapponi and Brunello Rondi. Amid Fellini's characteristic combination of dreamlike, outrageous, and artistic imagery, Marcello Mastroianni plays Snàporaz, a man who voyages through male and female spaces towards a confrontation with his own attitudes towards women and his wife.

== Plot ==
Snàporaz wakes up during a train ride and has a brief fling with a mysterious woman in the bathroom, but it is cut short when the train suddenly stops at Fregene and the woman gets off. Snàporaz follows her through a forest and into a hotel overrun with women in attendance for a surrealistic feminist convention. He winds up in a conference about polyandry, where his presence is rejected. A frightened Snàporaz retreats to the hotel lobby, but the exit is blocked; instead, he seeks refuge inside an elevator with a young woman, Donatella, who offers her assistance.

Donatella leads Snàporaz into a gymnasium and forces him to don roller skates. He is yet again cornered and berated by a group of angry women who circle around him in roller skates and practice testicle-kicking with a dummy. Dazed, Snàporaz makes his exit down a flight of stairs, falling down and hurting himself, and into the domain of a burly woman tending to the hotel's furnace. The woman offers him a ride to the train station on her motorcycle, but she stops by a farm and lures Snàporaz into a nursery, where she tries to rape him. They are interrupted by the woman's mother, who steps in to chastise her daughter. Snàporaz escapes and follows a lonely woman through the countryside. He joins her and her girlfriends in a car ride on the promise of being delivered to the station, but the ride goes on well into the night, the women smoking marijuana and listening to Italo disco. A frustrated Snàporaz ditches the women only to be harassed by others. He finally finds shelter at the mansion of Dr. Xavier Katzone, who shoots at his persecutors.

Dr. Katzone promises to deliver Snàporaz to the train station in the morning and invites him to stay for a party. Snàporaz walks around Katzone's extravagant home, which is filled with sexual imagery and phallic sculptures. He is also fascinated by a collection of photographs on the manor walls commemorating Katzone's sexual conquests; the photos light up and whisper arousing dialogue. Taking pride in his many inventions, Katzone celebrates his 10,000th conquest with an eccentric party that involves the blowing out of 10,000 candles and a performance by his wife, in which she sucks coins and pearls into her vagina by means of telekinesis. During the party, Snàporaz encounters his ex-wife, Elena, who has a drunken argument with him, and meets Donatella again.

The police (composed solely of women dressed in Nazi attire) arrive, interrupting Katzone mid-song and announcing the imminent demolition of his house. They also inform him that they have shot his most beloved dog, Italo, which a grieving Katzone buries. Meanwhile, Snàporaz dances to a song by Fred Astaire with a scantily clad Donatella and a friend of hers, but he fails to sleep with either of them, instead getting stuck in bed with his ex-wife. Hearing strange noises, he crawls under the bed, entering another dreamlike world in which he slides down a toboggan, revisiting his childhood crushes (including a sitter, a nurse, and a prostitute) along the way. Caged at the end of the slide, he is transported before a bizarre court and judged for his masculinity. Dismissed and set free, he climbs into a towering boxing ring before a female crowd. At the top of the ring, he boards a hot air balloon in the form of Donatella. Donatella herself fires at him from below with a machine gun, bursting the balloon and sending Snàporaz plummeting.

Snàporaz wakes up again on the very same train, with Elena across the way, indicating the entire story has been a mere nightmare. Just as he comes to this conclusion, he realizes his glasses are broken (as in his dream), before the mysterious woman and Donatella walk in and sit next to him. Elena and the mysterious woman exchange knowing smiles, and the train races into a tunnel.

== Cast ==
- Marcello Mastroianni as Snàporaz
- Anna Prucnal as Elena, the wife
- Bernice Stegers as woman on train
- Donatella Damiani as Donatella, woman on roller skates
- Iole Silvani as motorcyclist
- Ettore Manni as Dr. Xavier Katzone
- Fiammetta Baralla as Onlio
- Hélène G. Calzarelli as feminist
- Catherine Carrel as commandant
- Marcello Di Falco as slave
- Silvana Fusacchia as skater
- Gabriella Giorgelli as fishwoman of San Leo
- Dominique Labourier as feminist
- Stéphane Emilfork as feminist
- Sylvie Meyer as feminist
- Alessandra Panelli as housewife
- Marina Confalone as feminist (uncredited)
- Marina Hedman as first girl of Giro della Morte (uncredited)

== Critical reception ==
=== Italy and France ===
City of Women opened in eighty Italian theaters in March 1980 and received generally favorable reviews bordering "on respect rather than praise". Corriere della Sera critic Giovanni Grazzini interpreted the film as "a catalogue of emotions, sometimes grotesque, sometimes farcical, which provides a few caustic jibes against the destruction of femininity by aggressive feminism... From a stylistic point of view, it's less homogeneous than usual but other parts of the film are delightful. For instance, when fantasy is used to create types of people rather than caricatures. In this sense Fellini, having abandoned his gallery of monsters, becomes more prosaic. Or when the ambiguity of certain characters - an excellent example is the soubrette played by the charming Donatella Damiani - provides a touch of grace and bitchiness; or when the film becomes almost a musical; or when paradox becomes surrealist, such as the party and the hurricane at the villa of Katzone who's in despair because his favourite dog has died".

"Fellini appears as the Madame Bovary of his adolescence", wrote Claudio G. Fava for Corriere Mercantile. "He revels in the enjoyment he feels at working with an experienced crew, side by side with faithful technicians who simulate trains on the move or the sea washing the shores of the inevitable Romagnol beaches as though they were working of the set of Georges Méliès. But then, again and again, Fellini has shown us that he is the greatest and most ingenious of Méliès's heirs. Only the magic does not always work, especially in the attempt to create a kind of astonished confession of amused impotence when faced with the new woman of today, together with a feeling of nostalgia for the old woman of the past... Despite Fellini's extraordinary virtuosity, the film rarely achieves harmony of inspiration, of order, of strip-cartoon fantasy, or of irony." Francesco Bolzoni of L'Avvenire insisted that Fellini was "only playing games. But then we would hardly expect from Fellini a deep analysis of the nature of women... It is a game with occasional gaps and, more often, inventions that rejuvenate an all too familiar, all too hackneyed subject. A surprising serenity predominates... It is a film with a tragic vein that in the end proves to be light-hearted and occasionally amusing". La Notte magazine's Giorgio Carbone felt the maestro had "finally reached a splendid maturity that permits him to lavish his treasures upon us for the simple pleasure of doing so. Behind the festival of images and colours we can feel his delight in making this film, a delight which, from the very first scene, becomes ours too, and it's something we haven't felt in a long time... If the film lacks suspense in its story (we care little what happens to Snàporaz or Katzone because we know that sooner or later Rimini and those bosomy extras will appear on the scene), there's suspense in the images and in the scenic inventions".

Screened out of competition on 19 May 1980 at the 33rd Cannes Film Festival, the film was badly received by the majority of French critics, some of whom offered review titles such as "Zero for Fellini", "A Tiring Deception", "A Disaster", as well as "A Mountain of Tedious Pretension". Russian film director Andrei Tarkovsky, in Rome that year for the pre-production of Nostalghia, noted in his diary that City of Women was a fiasco: "At the Cannes Festival the papers said that Fellini's last film was a total disaster, and that he himself had ceased to exist. It's terrible, but it's true, his film is worthless."

=== United Kingdom ===
Derek Malcolm of The Guardian said the film was "full of Fellinian stereotypes, even if they do mouth words at times that come straight from feminist mouths." Patrick Gibbs of The Daily Telegraph wrote that "the once exciting Italian director, Federico Fellini, has long been in deep decline, at least to my taste; and his latest film City of Women,, shown at the Cannes Festival of 1980, is typical of his later work in that the illustration is often superb but the ideas infantile." Neil Sinyard of The Sunday Telegraph wrote that "rather than follow through hints about his fear of certain aspects of today's women and today's youth, Fellini eventually takes refuge in subjective reverie. Modernity is displaced 'by memory, and what promised to rise to incisive feminism has to make way for elegant frivolousness." Philip French of The Observer called it "an endless series of glittering, often vulgar, set-pieces at the service of a characteristic piece of confessional analysis that for all its theatrical flair remains a pretty childish exercise."

=== Australia ===
Susie Eisenhuth of The Sun-Herald wrote that "apart from the fact that feminists come in for a bit of a drubbing, the film, having dabbled with a more interesting approach to its subject, falls back on a series of predictable set pieces based on well-charted male fantasies." Neil Jillett of The Age wrote that "at 139 minutes 'City of Women' is far too long, and it never recaptures the exuberant silliness of the early scenes at the convention. But as a fantasy it is often beautiful and sets the imagination going, and as a confession it should give you a charitable fellow-feeling, a warm glow or superiority, or an occasional therapeutic flush of anger."

=== United States and Canada ===
Released by New Yorker Films in the United States on 8 April 1981, the film garnered generally favorable reviews but little box-office success. Daniel Talbot of New Yorker Films offered an explanation for the public's lack of interest: "Here, it played in less than fifty theatres, and of those, six provided 75 percent of the earnings. I don't know what Gaumont or Fellini could have expected with that kind of personal film. He had lost most of his audience here by then. Which isn't to say that I don't think him one of the great filmmakers of the world."

Kathleen Carroll of the New York Daily News said that "compared with Fellini's '8½,' 'City of Women' seems terribly flat and lifeless." Marke Andrews of The Sun in Vancouver wrote that "while City of Women is captivating, even dazzling at times, it is far too long for comfort. Several of the scenes, particularly those which take place at the playboy's party, drag on interminably." Jacqi Tully of The Arizona Daily Star wrote that the film "begins to drone once Snaporaz reaches Zuberkock's house. We've seen Fellini grapple with the male ego before, but he did it better in '8½,' and we've seen him go dreamy and surreal on us to the point of ridiculous self-absorption. The didacticism that was in 'Orchestra Rehearsal,' another recent Fellini movie that didn't work, is here, too. Message, message, find the message. The brilliant Fellini is the director who has looked into the past in fresh ways, as with 'I Vitelloni' and 'The Clowns,' and 'Amarcord,' who worked with what he knows best his homeland of Italy and the people there, as with 'La Strada,' and 'Roma' and 'Nights of Cabiria.' Fellini needs to have his hands in the earth, but in 'City of Women' his head is in the topical clouds. He's looking at feminism and the new woman, but making a movie on that subject isn't his strong suit. It's repetitive, used-up in spots. Fellini can overstate an image because he can do that magnificently, but he cannot overstate ideas. At that, he wilts."

Ed Blank of The Pittsburgh Press said the film was "like an extension of '8½', but bereft of inspiration and perilously close to self-parody." Joe Baltake of the Philadelphia Daily News called the film "hilariously awful, an incomprehensible pop-art bore. Above and beyond the fact that Fellini is rehashing his same old thoughts here and trying to foist them on us as some great vision of feminism, the film is also sloppily made and badly acted. Still, there's no doubt in my mind that this will be an art-house hit. Fellini has so successfully bamboozled pseudo-intellectuals in the past 10 years that many of them are convinced that a film's importance is directly related to its incoherence. I've a hunch that 'City of Women' will be mistaken for something serious and will be promptly overintellectualized. Instead, it should be simply dismissed as desperate filmmaking by a tired filmmaker. If I hadn't known beforehand that this was made by Fellini, I'd have taken it for a Fellini spoof from Andy Warhol's film factory. It plays like Fellini imitating Bob Fosse imitating Lina Wertmuller imitating Fellini."

Desmond Ryan of The Philadelphia Inquirer said that "at the conclusion of Fellini's 138-minute collage of dreams and sexual fantasies, Marcello Mastroianni imagines himself suspended in the basket of a giant balloon that is shaped like a voluptuous woman. Much of what precedes this rather whimsical ending has the substance of hot air, and that is a keen disappointment, since City of Women begins with every sign of having something to say about the impact of feminism on relations between the sexes." Candice Russell of the Fort Lauderdale News wrote that "you leave City of Women dazzled by what Fellini hath wrought visually, climaxed by the glittering roller coaster sequence that brings Snaporaz in touch with the sexuality of his boyhood. But the impression is muddled because you don't know exactly who or what he's lampooning, or even why." Gene Siskel of the Chicago Tribune called the film "a repetitive, overlong essay on the predicament of modern man confronted by the women's movement. Five years ago, this film might have been fresh; today, it's more like an endless doodle by a master filmmaker." He added:

The principal point the film makes is obvious: Men think of women as madonnas and whores; women prefer to think of themselves as individuals.

Inasmuch as you probably knew that walking into the theater, one is left to simply admire and eventually despair of Fellini's signature imagery of grotesque beings and carnival-like commotion. We have seen this film before.

To put it another way: Is Fellini really trying to stretch himself when he offers as his final image a light at the end of a tunnel?

Roger Ebert of the Chicago Sun-Times wrote that the film "does nothing original or very challenging with this material. Although it pretends to be Fellini's film about feminism, it reveals no great understanding of the subject; Fellini basically sees feminists as shrill harems of whip-wielding harridans, forever dangling the carrot of sex just out of reach of his suffering hero. Fellini has rarely been able to discover human beings hidden inside his female characters, and it's a little late for him to start blaming that on the women's liberation movement." He added:

Is “City of Women” worth seeing? Yes, probably, even though it is not a successful movie and certainly not up to Fellini's best work. It's worth seeing because it's a bedazzling collection of images, because at times it's a graceful and fluid celebration of pure filmmaking skill, and because Fellini can certainly make a bad film but cannot quite make a boring one.

Donna Chernin of The Plain Dealer wrote that " Fellini takes us on a visually arresting ride that teems with symbolism and colorful characters but which finally proves an unsatisfying trip. One leaves 'City of Women' wishing that its creator had dared to explore some new territories." Patrick Taggart of the Austin American-Statesman wrote that "one assumes Fellini gets great personal satisfaction out of these flights of imaginative fancy. The audience, by contrast, feels a little like a victim of a ceremonial stoning. After the first hour, I could not force my eyes to follow the subtitles any more. It wasn't a matter of keeping the eyes open—there is plenty of entertaining imagery—the problem is the story, which snakes through Fellini's thicket with more hairpin turns than a European car rally." Lou Cedrone of the Baltimore Evening Sun called the film "noisy and witless. It looks like the work of a dirty old man, a nocturnal eruption if you will, and because it is not cheap, because it won't begin to win back the money invested in it, Fellini may have made his last major film. A pity. 'City of Women,' at the Charles, is grotesque, a film, which, at 134 minutes, seems endless. The maestro has gone back to his "8 1/2" and come up with zero."

Tom McElfresh of The Cincinnati Enquirer described the film as having "events and elements that warrant all the usual Fellini review words again: Macabre, penetrating, illusive, antic, astounding, perverse, playful, acerbic . . . Almost." Lawrence Toppman of The Charlotte News wrote that "one thing can be said with certainty about this confusing compendium of images: it ain't whistling a happy tune." Joann Rhetts of The Charlotte Observer called the film "a grotesque dream banquet from which participants will awake hungry." Robert W. Butler of The Kansas City Star said that the film "has so many conflicting elements—from the aging satyr whose living room is shared by a collection of phallic statuary and a shrine to his mother to the tribunal of women who convict Snaporaz of misunderstanding females—that you can draw any conclusion. Aggressively bouncing breasts issue silent challenges to mousy men incapable of action. Nobody comes out the winner. Because Mr. Fellini isn’t offering any new observations, it falls to his unique visual style to make 'City of Women' diverting." To Casey St. Charnez of the Santa Fe New Mexican, the film "takes a simple proposition—what if women ruled society?—and turns it into two hours of eye-filling dreck."

For Vincent Canby of The New York Times, however, the film was a success: "Though the film is overlong, even for a Fellini aficionado, it is spell-binding, a dazzling visual display that is part burlesque, part satire, part Folies-Bergère, and all cinema. As Snàporaz is haunted by the phantoms of all the women he has known, or wanted to know, from childhood on, Mr Fellini in City of Women is obsessed by his own feelings toward women, by his need for them, his treatment (mostly poor) of them, his continued fascination by them and his awareness that (thank heavens) they'll always be different... Though City of Women is about a libertine, it's anything but licentious. Mr Fellini's licentiousness suggests a profound longing for some kind of protective discipline, if not complete chastity. As such discipline would destroy Snàporaz, it would make impossible the conception and production of a film as wonderfully uninhibited as City of Women." John Gould Boyum of The Wall Street Journal observed that "the film's entire thrust has little or nothing to do with the striking of attitudes, the analyzing of ideas. What Fellini seems after here is the recording and communicating of a set of feelings: those complex, contradictory ones experienced by a middle-aged Italian male suddenly faced with a cataclysmic upheaval in social and sexual mores... We do not go to Fellini to immerse ourselves in story and character or to encounter ideas. What we want from the maestro and what he gives us are fabulous adventures in feeling - a decidedly original mixture of nostalgia, poignancy, and joy that is unmistakably Fellini's own." Nancy Scott had a similar opinion, writing in the San Francisco Examiner that Fellini "plays ringmaster to his own psyche like the greatest showman on earth, and that's fun while it lasts. Afterwards, it's no more interesting than any ordinary fellow's obsession."

Bruce Bailey of the Montreal Gazette commented that "though this may all sound a little too didactic, this two hour and 15 minute movie manages to hold our attention because it's still a fine example of Fellini's imaginative knack at work." Sheila Benson of the Los Angeles Times called the film "fine, mature Fellini with a few reprises from the past but memorable and inspired new ones as well. Nowhere is there a sense of a tired film maker retreading his images yet again. The viewpoint is not only affectionate (which can have overtones of condescension), but generous. Fellini views neither with alarm nor judgment, but with wide-eyed fascination the women he has been quoted as saying, 'represent myth, mystery, diversity, fascination, the thirst for knowledge and the search for one's own identity.'" Micheline Keating of the Tucson Citizen said that "you can almost hear [Fellini's] laughter all the way through this wonderfully witty and flamboyant film — laughter at the wayward oddballs who people his scenes, laughter at the inequities with which he hoodwinks and delights his viewers, even gentle laughter at himself for being such a provocative deluder." Bill Cosford of The Miami Herald called the film "a spectacular return to form by an immensely entertaining filmmaker." Marylynn Uricchio of the Pittsburgh Post-Gazette said the film was "so imaginative, so much in a class by itself that it redefines, like all Fellini films, the boundaries of cinema. It's sophisticated, delightful, occasionally trying and not for everybody. For Fellini, it's another shining accomplishment." Michael Maza of The Arizona Republic called the film "a fascinating survey of the modern sexual landscape." Joanna Connors of The Minneapolis Star wrote that "Fellini has little new to say about the sexual carnival, but he portrays it with such wit and ferocity that 'City of Women,' though very long, rarely becomes tiresome."

John V. Hurst of The Sacramento Bee said it was "unsettling, surreal, and typically Fellini in being replete with ephemeral, allegorical allusions that are placed alongside the starkly obvious." Will Jones of The Minneapolis Tribune wrote that "maybe there's a case to be made for the possibility that he lets it go on a bit too long, but I'd be hard put to think of a single frame that could have been left out." Dale Stevens of The Cincinnati Post wrote that "Fellini is a great stylist. But with his style comes content. And 'City of Women' has plenty of important ideas offered for individual interpretation. It’s quite a marvelous movie." Diane Haithman of the Detroit Free Press called the film "a funny, nostalgic dirge for the death of middle-aged machismo at the hands of the New Woman." Perry Stewart of the Fort Worth Star-Telegram wrote that "the fact that City of Women is 'standard Fellini' accounts for much of its appeal. Perhaps he needs to be chided for lack of invention, but that's a stone I can't hurl. When the same old bizarre imagery is consistently good as well, as thematically on target, why change?" Betsy Light of The Indianapolis Star wrote that "for those who know and like Fellini's work, 'City of Women,' should prove an entertaining frolic in fantasy. And for those unacquainted with his magical worlds, this film could prove a titillating introduction." Joe Pollack of the St. Louis Post-Dispatch wrote that "Fellini overdoes much of the sexual symbolism, and 'City of Women' lingers too long in many scenes, but it's often a lot of fun."
