= Armaguedon =

- Directed by: Alain Jessua
- Written by: Alain Jessua (adaptation); Alain Jessua (dialogue)
- Based on: The Voice of Armageddon; 1974 novel by David Lippincott
- Produced by: Raymond Danon; Alain Delon
- Starring: Alain Delon; Jean Yanne
- Cinematography: Jacques Robin
- Edited by: Héléne Plemiannikov
- Music by: Astor Piazzolla
- Production companies: Lira Films; Adel Productions; Filmes
- Distributed by: AMLF (France)
- Release date: 16 March 1977
- Running time: 95 minutes
- Countries: France; Italy
- Language: French

Armaguedon (Italian: Quel giorno il mondo tremerà) is a 1977 crime-thriller film starring Alain Delon, and adapted from the novel The Voice of Armageddon by David Lippincott.

It recorded admissions of 716,098 in France.

== Plot ==
After years of poverty, Carrier, a repairman, inherits a large sum of money upon his brother's death in an accident. Now rich, he decides it is time to make his mark. Becoming more and more mentally unstable, he begins to threaten police and the government signing his tracts.

== Cast ==
- Alain Delon as Dr. Michel Ambroise
- Jean Yanne as Louis Carrier
- Renato Salvatori as Albert, aka "Einstein"
- Michel Duchaussoy as Inspector Jacques Vivien
- Marie Déa as Gisèle Valin
- Michel Creton as Bob
- Susanna Javicoli as Gabriella
- Guy Saint-Jean as Dupré
- Luigi Lavagnetto as Sampieri
- Jeanne Herviale as La voisine d'en face
- Gabriel Cattand as Jimmy Laurent
- Robert Dalban as Taxi Driver
- Michèle Cotta as Journalist
