= Jack La Cayenne =

Italian comedian and actor

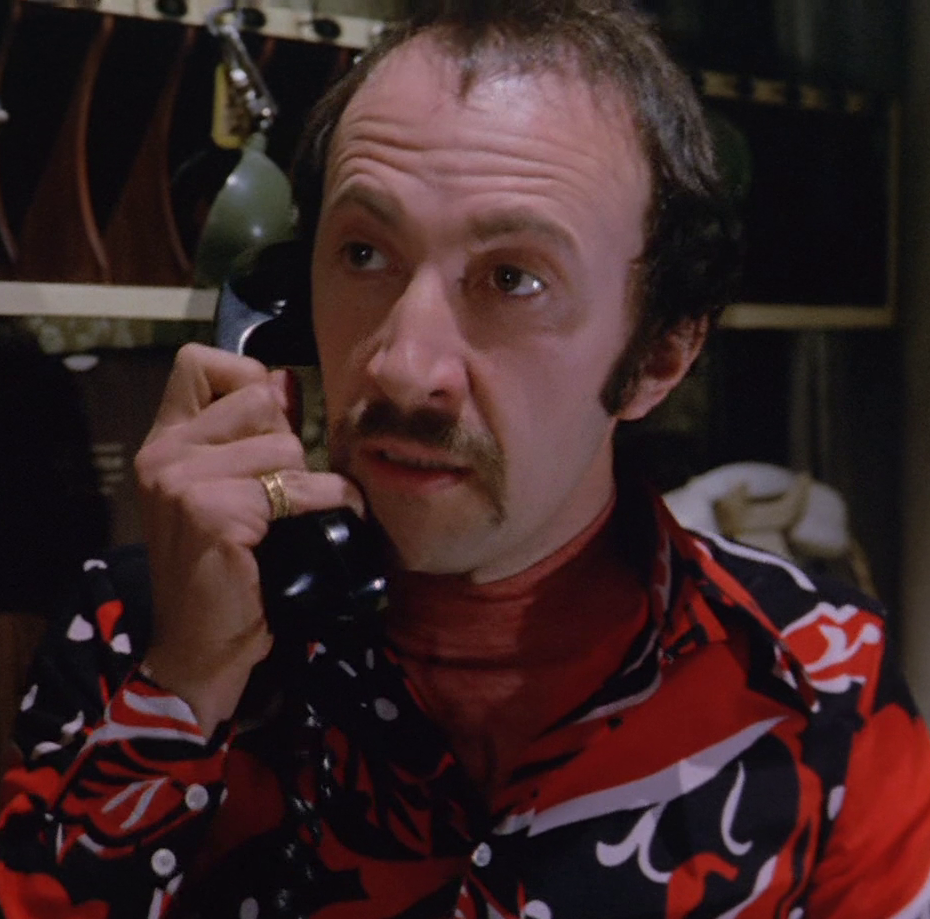
- La Cayenne in Death Occurred Last Night (1970)
- Born: Alberto Longoni; 4 January 1937 (age 89); Milan, Italy
- Occupations: Comedian; Dancer; Actor

Alberto Longoni (born 4 January 1937), best known as Jack La Cayenne, is an Italian comedian, dancer and actor.

== Life and career ==
Born in Milan, La Cayenne became first known as a rock'n'roll acrobatic dancer in the second half of the 1950s; his skills in mimicry and flexible movements earned him the nickname "Molleggiato" ('Spring-loaded'), which was soon afterward associated with Adriano Celentano. He later became an international attraction, performing on night clubs, theaters, casinos and luxury hotels, and also appearing on The Ed Sullivan Show.

In Italy, La Cayenne is best known for his participation in the Rai 1 Variety show Non stop, where he performed a recurring sketch in which he ate a coffee cup. He was also active in films, mostly in character roles, best known for his appearances in Sergio Corbucci's What's Your Sign? and in Celentano's Yuppi du; in 1976, he had his only leading role, in Giancarlo Nicotra's comedy film Vai col liscio.
