= Jean Mailland =

- Born: Jean Michaud; 26 April 1937; Aix-les-Bains, Savoie, France
- Died: 9 May 2017 (aged 80)
- Education: Conservatoire national supérieur de musique et de danse de Lyon
- Occupations: Film director, novelist, playwright, songwriter
- Spouse: Anna Prucnal

Jean Mailland (26 April 1937 – 9 May 2017) was a French film director, novelist, playwright and songwriter.

== Early life ==
Jean Mailland was born as Jean Michaud on 26 April 1937 in Aix-les-Bains. He graduated from the Conservatoire national supérieur de musique et de danse de Lyon. He also attended Roger Planchon's classes at the Théâtre de la Comédie in Lyon and Henri Bose's classes in Paris.

== Career ==
Mailland began his career as a television film director at Studios de Buttes Chaumont. He was an assistant to Claude Barma, André Michel and Jean-Jacques Vierne. He also directed feature films. He wrote many songs for his wife, Anne Prucnal.

Mailland was the author of novels and plays. He also composed poetry.

== Personal life and death ==
Mailland was married to Anna Prucnal. He died on 9 May 2017.

== Works ==
=== Poems ===
- Tout merveilleusement (HC, 1955)
- Le Présent définitif (Le Bruit des autres, 2005)
- Ombres des choses naturelles (Le Bruit des autres, 2006)
- Village. État de lieux (Le Bruit des autres, 2013)

=== Novels ===
- Armand Gatti, l'enclos (Fayard, 1961)
- Les Compagnons de Baal (Solar, 1967)
- La Tête à la renverse, roman (Calmann-Lévy, 1971)
- Moi qui suis née à Varsovie (co-authored with Anna Prucnal, Neige/L'Archipel, 2002)
- Déclaration d’absence (Neige/Le Bruit des autres, 2004)
- Chansons et contre-chansons pour Anna (Éditions l'Amourier, 2004)
- Le Journal des arbres (Le Bruit des autres, 2009)

=== Plays ===
- Les Mauvais Coups (1974)
- Travail (1986)
- La Brûlée vive (1988)
- Face à face (1989)
- Noyés (1989)
- Guernika 1937, une revue lyrique (1996)
- Déserteur (1997)
