= Prostituzione =

1974 film

- Film poster
- Directed by: Rino Di Silvestro
- Written by: Rino Di Silvestro
- Starring: Maria Fiore; Elio Zamuto; Krista Nell
- Release date: 1974
- Country: Italy
- Language: Italian

Prostituzione (lit. Prostitution; also known as Love Angels and The Red Light Girls) is a 1974 Italian giallo film written and directed by Rino Di Silvestro.

== Plot ==
Prostitutes in Italy find themselves being stalked by a mysterious killer.

== Cast ==
- Maria Fiore - Primavera
- Aldo Giuffré - Inspector Macaluso
- Paolo Giusti - Antonio
- Magda Konopka - Mrs. North
- Lucretia Love
- Liana Trouché
- Andrea Scotti - Lt. Variale
