= Rino Di Silvestro =

Italian director, screenwriter, producer, and actor

- Born: Salvatore Di Silvestro; 30 January 1932; Rome, Italy
- Died: 3 October 2009 (aged 77); Rome, Italy
- Occupation(s): Director, screenwriter

Salvatore Di Silvestro, best known as Rino Di Silvestro (30 January 1932 - 3 October 2009) was an Italian director, screenwriter, producer and actor.

== Life and career ==
Born in Rome, Di Silvestro became first known thanks to Op bop pop nip, a play that he wrote, directed and in whose original production he starred: it was continuously represented at the Teatro delle Muse in Rome from 1962 to 1966. After having collaborated uncredited to the screenplays of a number of genre films in 1973, he made his debut as director with Women in Cell Block 7, a film which is regarded as the first Italian women in prison film.

== Selected filmography ==
- Women in Cell Block 7 (1973)
- Prostituzione (1974)
- Deported Women of the SS Special Section (1976)
- Werewolf Woman (1976)
- Baby Love (1979)
- Bello di mamma (1980)
- Hanna D. - The Girl from Vondel Park (1984)
- The Erotic Dreams of Cleopatra (1985)
