= Geppo il folle =

- Directed by: Adriano Celentano
- Starring: Adriano Celentano; Claudia Mori; Marco Columbro
- Cinematography: Alfio Contini
- Edited by: Adriano Celentano
- Music by: Adriano Celentano
- Distributed by: Consorzio Italiano Distributori Indipendenti Film
- Release date: 1978
- Country: Italy
- Language: Italian

Geppo il folle is a 1978 Italian musical-comedy film written, directed and starred by Adriano Celentano.

== Plot ==
Geppo is a successful singer, idolized in Italy and famous throughout Europe, who wants to make it big in America, where his idol, Barbra Streisand, lives—the only person in the world he considers to be on his level. But he doesn't know English. So, he turns to an attractive English teacher, Gilda, who gives him some lessons. Every time Geppo shows up in class, the female students literally fall at his feet, but Gilda seems to resist his charm.

Meanwhile, he attracts the animosity of three young men who try to kill him, and at first, it seems like they succeed. However, he survives and begins to "preach"; he even delivers a sort of speech on a mountain, but no one listens to him. But when he starts singing, everyone goes wild for him.

He also wins Gilda's love, who actually always had feelings for him. However, Gilda wants him to stay with her and not go to America. Geppo, on the other hand, decides to leave, and as photographers capture him on the steps of the plane about to depart, he grabs the flight attendant in his arms and kisses her, thus showing that he puts success above everything else.

== Cast ==
- Adriano Celentano: Geppo
- Claudia Mori: Gilda
- Iris De Santis: mother of Geppo
- Marco Columbro: disc jockey
- Jennifer: Marcella
- Gino Santercole: journalist
- Loredana Del Santo: student
- Giorgio Faletti: student
