= Anna Moroni =

Italian cook and television personality (born 1939)

Anna Moroni in 2024

Anna Moroni (née Urbani; born 27 February 1939 in Rome) is an Italian cook and television personality, chiefly known for taking part in the cooking show La prova del cuoco from 2002 to 2018. Not a professional chef, she previously worked as an interpreter for the Australian embassy in Italy. Since 2013, she has also had a cooking school in the Prati rione of Rome.

== Biography ==
After graduating as an accountant, Anna Moroni worked as an interpreter at the Embassy of Australia in Rome before dedicating her career to gastronomy.

She became a household name primarily for her participation in the popular Italian television cooking show La prova del cuoco, which aired live on Rai 1. From 2002 to 2018, she hosted a recurring segment in which she provided cooking lessons to the show's host, Antonella Clerici. Both Moroni and Clerici departed from the program on June 1, 2018.

In addition to her television work, she has authored several cookbooks, some of which were co-written with Antonella Clerici.
