= Paolo Poiret =

Italian actor and voice actor

- Born: 29 September 1945; Milan, Italy
- Died: 1 November 2015 (aged 70); Rocca San Giovanni, Italy
- Occupations: Actor; voice actor; dubbing director
- Years active: 1972–2015

Paolo Poiret (29 September 1945 – 1 November 2015) was an Italian actor and voice actor.

== Biography ==
Poiret began working on stage in 1972 and entered a career of film, television and voice acting in 1975. He was mostly active as a voice dubber during the 1980s and he dubbed over the voices of Robert De Niro, Craig T. Nelson, Steve Martin, Harvey Keitel and Arnold Schwarzenegger in some of their films. He was also the Italian voice of Leonard "Bones" McCoy (portrayed by DeForest Kelley) in Star Trek III: The Search for Spock.

In Poiret's animated roles, he was renowned locally and internationally for providing the Italian dubbed voice of The Horned King (originally voiced by John Hurt) in the 1985 Disney film The Black Cauldron. He also voiced Venger in the Italian version of Dungeons & Dragons.

== Death ==
After a long illness, Poiret died on 1 November 2015 in Rocca San Giovanni at the age of 70.

== Filmography ==
=== Cinema ===
- Killer Cop (1975)
- Stark System (1980)
- Cartoline da Roma (1980)

=== Television ===
- Una tranquilla coppia di killer (1982)
- Vuoto di memoria (1983)
- A viso coperto (1985)
- Puccini (2009)

== Dubbing roles ==
=== Animation ===
- The Horned King in The Black Cauldron
- Venger in Dungeons & Dragons

=== Live action ===
- Neal Page in Planes, Trains and Automobiles
- Louis Cyphre in Angel Heart
- Steve Freeling in Poltergeist
- Edward R. Rooney in Ferris Bueller's Day Off
- Roger Murdock in Airplane!
- Leonard McCoy in Star Trek III: The Search for Spock
- Judas Iscariot in The Last Temptation of Christ
- Lord Kalidor in Red Sonja
- Terry Gilliam's roles in Monty Python's The Meaning of Life
- Herman Dietrich in Indiana Jones and the Raiders of the Lost Ark
- Andrew Bogomil in Beverly Hills Cop
- Andrew Bogomil in Beverly Hills Cop II
- Wylie Cooper in Best Defense
- Alan Shepard in The Right Stuff
