= Elio Zamuto =

Italian actor and voice actor (1941–2026)

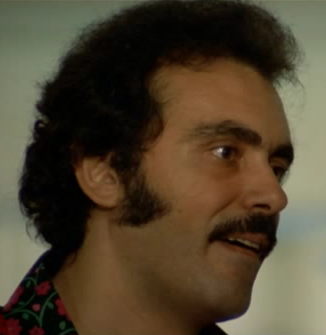
- Zamuto in Shoot First, Die Later (1974)
- Born: Elio Mazzamuto; 1 May 1941; Syracuse, Italy
- Died: 9 September 2026 (aged 85); Oriolo Romano, Italy
- Occupation: Actor
- Years active: 1965–2026

Elio Mazzamuto (1 May 1941 – 9 September 2026), known professionally as Elio Zamuto, was an Italian actor.

== Life and career ==
Born in Syracuse, Sicily, Zamuto started his career in the mid-1960s, and had a prolific career between television and cinema, especially during the 1970s and mainly playing roles of seducer, gangster or police officer.

As a voice actor, he was best known as the official Italian dubbing voice of Tom Selleck in the TV-series Magnum, P.I.

Zamuto died on 9 September 2026, at the age of 85.

== Partial filmography ==
- Catherine, il suffit d'un amour (1969) – Le soldat jobard
- Un caso di coscienza (1970) – Nunzio
- The Sicilian Checkmate (1972) – Verzi
- Shadows Unseen (1972) – Sgt. Mortesi
- The Assassin of Rome (1972) – Italo Balbo
- Black Turin (1972) – Scarcella
- Shoot First, Die Later (1974) – Rio
- Silence the Witness (1974) – Judge Belli
- Prostituzione (1974) – Michele Esposito
- Il trafficone (1974) – Vito Macaluso
- How to Kill a Judge (1975) – Onorevole Ugo Selimi
- Calling All Police Cars (1975) – Professore Giacometti
- Gamma (1975) – Procuratore Forel
- Werewolf Woman (1976) – Psychiatrist
- Violent Naples (1976) – Franco Casagrande
- Bloody Payroll (1976) – Police Commissioner Foschi
- Destruction Force (1977) – Belli
- SuperGulp! (1978–1979) – Lothar (voice)
- Il mammasantissima (1979) – Avvocato
- The Nurse in the Military Madhouse (1979) – John – the Thief
- The Finzi Detective Agency (1979) – Commissario Salimbeni
- Blood Ties (1986)
- Il giornalino di Gian Burrasca (1991) – The Father (voice)
