= Marco Columbro =

Italian actor and television host

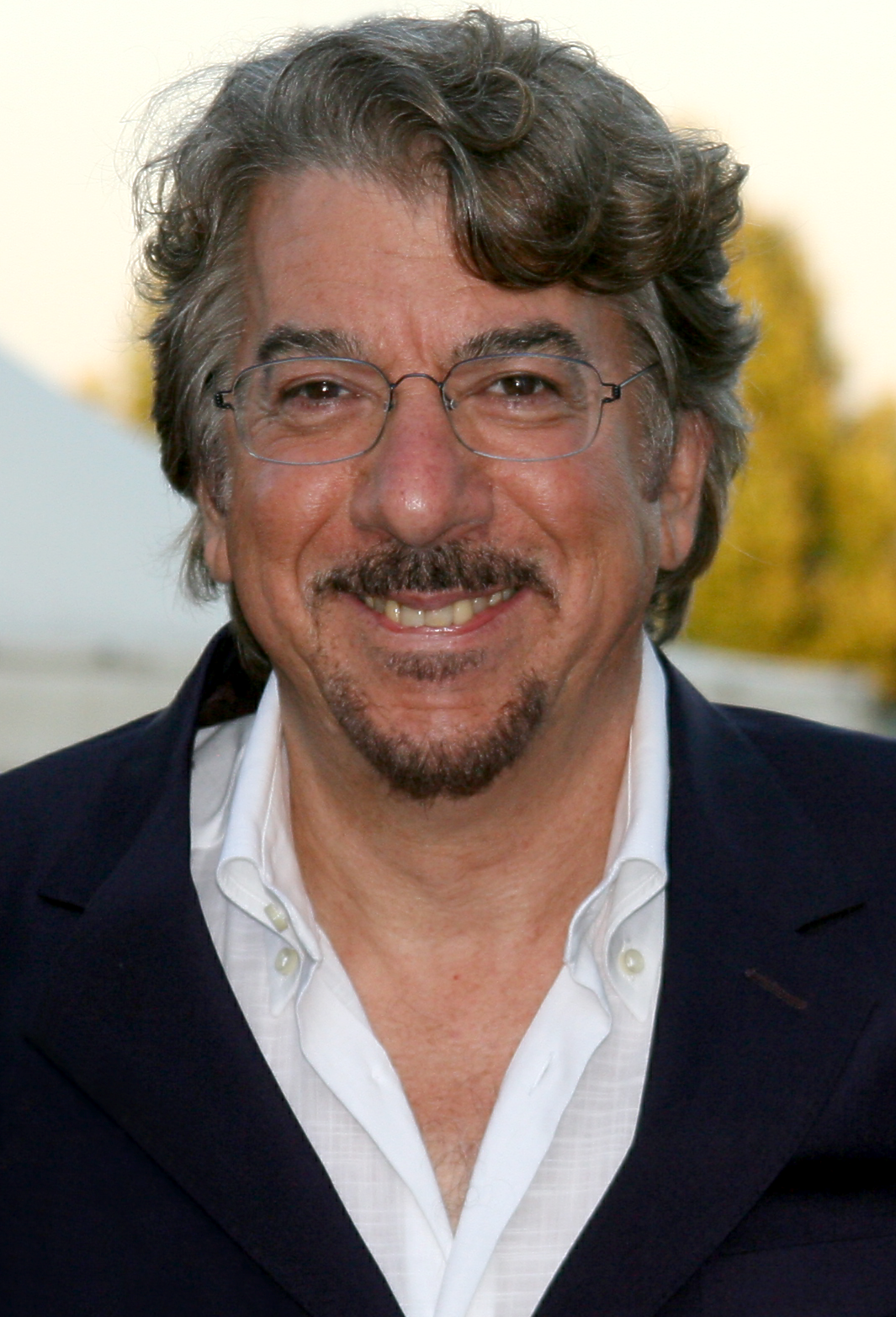
- Columbro in 2009
- Born: 28 June 1950 (age 75); Viareggio, Italy
- Occupations: TV presenter; actor
- Height: 177 cm (5 ft 10 in)

Marco Columbro (born 28 June 1950) is an Italian actor and television host.

== Biography ==
Marco Columbro was born in Viareggio, Tuscany. He had a Roman Catholic background but later became a follower of 14th Dalai Lama and Buddhist and Oriental concepts.

He studied psychology at the University of Florence. Columbro worked as actor for numerous companies, collaborating, among the others, with Dario Fo. In 1981 he debuted for television as dubber of a puppet in Canale 5, Silvio Berlusconi's channel. Columbro subsequently hosted numerous shows in Berlusconi's channel, including Buona Domenica and Tra moglie e marito.

In 2003 he briefly worked for RAI, Italian's state television, for a show with Lorella Cuccarini. From 1993 onwards he worked mostly as actor for television series and for theatrical productions.

In the 1990s, he had a relationship with Elena Perrucchini, with whom he had a son in 1993. After a second relationship with Stefania Santini from 2008 to 2011, he has been engaged to Marzia Risalti, with whom he runs a hotel near Siena.

== Filmography ==
Year	Title	Role	Notes
1978	Geppo il folle	The disc jockey	
1980	The Taming of the Scoundrel	The driver	
1981	Le corderie dell'immaginario		
2004	Tommaso è andato via		
2006	Parentesi tonde	Marco Columbro	
