= Women in Cell Block 7 =

1973 film

- Directed by: Rino Di Silvestro
- Written by: Rino Di Silvestro, Jack Lyons
- Starring: Anita Strindberg; Eva Czemerys; Jenny Tamburi
- Music by: Franco Bixio
- Release date: 1973
- Country: Italy
- Language: Italian

Diario segreto da un carcere femminile (International title: Women in Cell Block 7, UK title: Love in a Woman's Prison) is a 1973 Italian women-in-prison film written and directed by Rino Di Silvestro. It marks Di Silvestro's directorial debut and the first Italian entry in the women-in-prison genre. The story follows a woman who goes to prison to save her father's life.

== Cast ==
- Anita Strindberg as Hilda
- Eva Czemerys as Mother S.
- Jenny Tamburi as Daniela Vinci
- Cristina Gajoni as Religious Prisoner
- Bedy Moratti as Pyromaniac
- Massimo Serato as The Warden
- Elisa Mainardi as Prison Matron
- Olga Bisera as Gerda
- Valeria Fabrizi as Napolitana
- Paola Senatore as Musumeci
- Roger Browne as Inspector Weil
- Franco Fantasia as Chief Inspector
- Umberto Raho as Daniela's Lawyer
- Gabriella Giorgelli
