= The Devil Is a Woman (1974 film) =

1974 film by Damiano Damiani

- Italian theatrical release poster
- Il sorriso del grande tentatore
- Directed by: Damiano Damiani
- Written by: Damiano Damiani; Audrey Nohra; Fabrizio Onofri
- Produced by: Anis Nohra
- Starring: Glenda Jackson
- Cinematography: Mario Vulpiani
- Edited by: Peter Taylor
- Music by: Ennio Morricone
- Release date: 1974
- Running time: 105 minutes
- Countries: United Kingdom; Italy
- Language: English

The Devil Is a Woman (Italian: Il sorriso del grande tentatore, UK title: The Tempter) is a 1974 British-Italian drama film directed by Damiano Damiani and starring Glenda Jackson and Claudio Cassinelli. It was written by Damiani, Audrey Nohra and Fabrizio Onofri.

== Plot ==
Sister Geraldine is the head of a convent that has a hospital wing for troubled patients. She resorts to bullying and tormenting those who come to this place, but things change when Rodolfo, a writer editing the life story of a priest who collaborated with the Nazis, comes to stay.

== Cast ==
- Glenda Jackson as Sister Geraldine
- Claudio Cassinelli as Rodolfo Solina
- Lisa Harrow as Emilia Contreras
- Adolfo Celi as Father Borelli
- Duilio Del Prete as Monsignor Salvi
- Arnoldo Foà as Monsignor Badensky
- Gabriele Lavia as Prince Ottavio Ranieri d'Aragona
- Francisco Rabal as Bishop Marquez
- André Trottier as Bishop's assistant
- Rolf Tasna as Monsignor Meitner
- Sara Sperati as Princess Alessandra Ranieri d'Aragona (credited as Adele Sperati)
- Edoardo Canali
- Edda Ferronao as Kitchen maid
- Ely Galleani as Rodolfo's girlfriend
- Margherita Horowitz as Prince Ottavio's mother
- Fabrizio Jovine as the doctor

== Reception ==
The Monthly Film Bulletin wrote: "In spite of its firmly modern setting, Glenda Jackson's presence, and an excellently dubbed soundtrack, the thematic interest of The Tempter in this country would seem to be slight. ... The camera and sets constantly emphasise that 'we are, part of one another' by means of a regular juxtaposition of long, high 'public' shots of the ascetic, well-lit corridor with a mobile investigation of the more ornate decor of the private rooms. Exterior sequences are kept to a minimum, and the use of music – even ritual music – is perfunctory. The dominant tone, from the backcloth of the credits sequence to the nuns' habits and the interiors of the convent, is an antiseptic grey. None of the momentous events, past or present, is ever enacted, but simply presented or referred to, and the lush panoply of Catholicism which Fellini, for example, delights in, is totally absent. This relentless singlemindedness is only bearable because, in taking literally the dictum 'in my house are many mansions'."

The Independent Film Journal wrote: "The characters in this Italian-British co-production are put through a series of personality changes so abrupt, with so little regard for such things as motivation or continuity, that it's as if the projectionist had scrambled the sequence of the reels. The lack of clarity, compounded by long stretches of undramatic verbosity, murky symbolism and a surprisingly uninspired, mannered performance by star Glenda Jackson hardly bodes well for commercial acceptance, even at those select art sites where the Jackson name would normally count as a draw. ... At times indulging in trendy pot-shots at the hypocrisy of the church hierarchy, at other times reverentially affirming the power of faith, Damiani may have designed the film to express his love-hate attitudes towards Catholicism. But whatever his intentions, nothing comes through clearly, particularly on the dramatic level where the characters are too confusingly drawn to sustain interest. With Ms. Jackson's behavior unaccountably shifting back and forth between rationality and perversity, and Ms. Harrow vacillating like a weather-vane from atheism to devout faith, from frigidity to sudden seizures of nymphomania, what this convent needs more than anything else is a good exorcist."

Vincent Canby wrote in The New York Times: "The film seems to have been so badly edited for its American release that it contradicts its own plot at key places. Also, some of the post-sychronized English dialogue is impossible to understand. Behind this cracked facade one occasionally glimpses the traces of an interesting if overwrought intellectual drama of the kind that Europeans take more seriously than we do. ...Neither Miss Jackson nor the other performers is especially convincing meeting the film's sometimes operatic requirements, including suicide, self-abuse (a priest's discreet term), fetishism and the like. Moral dilemmas are introduced, labelled and then passed over, like the fancy decor seen by the camera. Nothing is explored in depth. The Devil Is a Woman sort of scratches ideas as if they were minor itches."

Boxoffice wrote: "Glenda Jackson's reputation in this country as a two-time Academy Award winner and an actress of fascinating power is the main selling point of this Italian-British co-production. Screenplay by Damiano Fabrizio Onofri and Audrey Nohra, from Damiani's story, has some interesting elements which never rise to dramatic heights under Damiani's direction."
