= Killer Cop =

- DVD Cover
- Directed by: Luciano Ercoli
- Screenplay by: Gianfranco Gallgarich
- Story by: Mario Bregni
- Produced by: Alberto Pugliese; Luciano Ercoli
- Starring: Claudio Cassinelli; Arthur Kennedy; Franco Fabrizi; Sara Sperati
- Cinematography: Marcello Gatti
- Edited by: Angelo Curi
- Music by: Stelvio Cipriani
- Production company: Prouzioni Atlas consorziate
- Distributed by: Prouzioni Atlas consorziate
- Release date: 27 March 1975 (Italy)
- Running time: 95 minutes
- Country: Italy
- Language: Italian
- Box office: ₤854.8 million

Killer Cop (Italian: La polizia ha le mani legate, literally the police's hands are tied) is a 1975 Italian poliziottesco-crime film directed in 1975 by Luciano Ercoli. The film's plot reprises the Piazza Fontana bombing which happened in Milan in 1969. The gun in the umbrella used in the movie is similar to a Bulgarian umbrella used in London in 1978 to kill Bulgarian dissident Georgi Markov.

== Cast ==
- Claudio Cassinelli as Commissioner Matteo Rolandi
- Arthur Kennedy as Armando Di Federico
- Franco Fabrizi as Luigi Balsamo
- Sara Sperati as Papaya Girotti
- Bruno Zanin as Franco Ludovisi
- Valeria D'Obici as Falena
- Enzo Fisichella as Francalancia
- Paolo Poiret as Rocco Altieri
- Giovanni Cianfriglia as Hitman
- Jack Lemmon as Narrator (voice, English version)

== Production ==
Killer Cop was shot in Milan. Killer Cop's plot is influenced from the Piazza Fontana bombings. The funerals seen in the film on a television screen are actual footage of the funerals of the victims of the bombings.

== Release ==
Killer Cop was released in Italy on 27 March 1975 where it was distributed by Prouzioni Atlas consorziate (P.A.C.). It grossed 854,798,250 Italian lire.

Killer Cop has been released on DVD in Italy by Cecchi Gori with a running time of 92 minutes and 58 seconds.

== Footnotes ==
=== References ===
- Curti, Roberto (2013). Italian Crime Filmography, 1968–1980. McFarland. ISBN 978-0786469765.
