= Deported Women of the SS Special Section =

- Danish theatrical poster
- Directed by: Rino Di Silvestro (as Alex Berger)
- Written by: Rino Di Silvestro
- Produced by: Giuseppe Zaccariello
- Starring: John Steiner; Lina Polito; Erna Schurer; Sara Sperati
- Cinematography: Sergio D'Offizi
- Edited by: Romeo Ciatti
- Music by: Stelvio Cipriani
- Distributed by: Italian Stallion Productions (US, dubbed)
- Release date: 1976
- Running time: 98 minutes
- Country: Italy
- Language: Italian

Le deportate della sezione speciale SS (internationally released as Deported Women of the SS Special Section, SS Special Section Women and Deported Women) is a 1976 Italian erotic-drama film directed by Rino Di Silvestro. The film is considered the first Italian Nazi exploitation film, after the "auteur" progenitors such as Liliana Cavani's art film Il portiere di notte and Tinto Brass' exploitation film Salon Kitty.

== Plot ==
In Nazi Germany, a group of female prisoners are transported by train to an SS concentration camp and subjected to torture by the camp commandant (John Steiner) and his guards which include a lesbian warden. There is also a joint suicide by cyanide capsule of a guard and his inmate lover just before they are forced to make love before the entire camp. Meanwhile the commandant develops an infatuation with a particular inmate, Tania Nobel, who he was in love with before the war and who rejected him in favor of another man, who is later murdered on the orders of the commandant. After initially attempting to starve herself, she feigns falling in love with him. However, following an evening together in the commandant's bedroom, he reveals his plan to escape to South America and in an act of revenge, Tania severs his manhood using a hidden razor blade in her vagina during their love making. During the film's climax whilst allowing the other inmates to escape, she guns down a group of SS guards, only to then be shot herself by one of the fatally wounded guards.

== Cast ==
- John Steiner: Herr Erner
- Lina Polito: Tania Nobel
- Erna Schürer: Kapo Helga
- Sara Sperati: Monique DuPré
- Solvi Stubing: Fräulein Greta
- Guido Leontini: Dobermann
- Stefania D'Amario: Angela Modena
- Rik Battaglia: Soldier Fredrick

== Production ==
Lina Polito was terrified when she read the script, especially for nude scenes. Rino Di Silvestro told her, and then had him add on her contract, that she would never shoot completely naked, but in the end, on the screen, she would appear as if she were. She had a little coverage, a triangle on her pubis and stars on her nipples. Silvestro filmed it in such a way that these covers were never seen. And she finally looked naked, but she wasn't.

== See also ==
- List of Italian films of 1976
