= Er Più – storia d'amore e di coltello =

- Directed by: Sergio Corbucci
- Written by: Mario Amendola, Sergio Corbucci
- Produced by: Salvatore Argento
- Starring: Adriano Celentano, Claudia Mori, Vittorio Caprioli, Fiorenzo Fiorentini
- Cinematography: Pasqualino De Santis
- Edited by: Eugenio Alabiso
- Music by: Carlo Rustichelli, Adriano Celentano, Sabatino Ciuffini
- Release date: 1971
- Running time: 108 minutes
- Country: Italy
- Language: Italian

Er Più – storia d'amore e di coltello is a 1971 Italian black comedy film directed by Sergio Corbucci.

The film is inspired by the true story of Romeo Ottaviani, a Roman bully called er Tinèa. In the film, a young gang member aspires to marry his love interest, but he has to deal with a rival suitor who is affiliated with another gang. His rival accidentally kills himself, and the gangster is able to marry his love interest. But he is killed shortly after his wedding by a cowardly enemy.

== Plot summary ==
The story is set in Rome in 1900. In a seedy area of the city, "borghiciano" Nino Patroni, called in Roman dialect "Er Più de Borgo", seeks to marry a fellow rogue to his sister. Nino also tries to fix himself with the beautiful turbines Rosa, but the girl is disputed by the protagonist with the squire Augustarello, leader of a gang of thugs in the village adverse to that of Nino.

After moments of respite and battles with stab wounds, Nino manages to make peace with the family of Augustarello; as a matter of fact, after Nino is wounded in a duel, Augustarello accidentally kills himself with his stab. Nino, in view of the wedding, makes also peace with the police officer who arrests him often because of his fights. However, just when the protagonist and Rose are just married, Nino is betrayed and killed by a coward commonly called "the Chinese", a slimy, cowardly impostor, who is always taunted by Nino and his band.

== Cast ==
- Adriano Celentano: Nino "Er Fanello" Patroni
- Claudia Mori: Rosa Turbine
- Vittorio Caprioli: "Er Cinese"
- Romolo Valli: Il Maresciallo
- Gianni Macchia: Augustarello Di Lorenzo
- Maurizio Arena: Bartolo Di Lorenzo
- Fiorenzo Fiorentini: Ignazio il "Frascatano"
- Ninetto Davoli: Antonio "Totarello" Cerino
- Gino Santercole: Verdicchio
- Gino Pernice: Pietro Di Lorenzo
- Anita Durante: Teresa
- Alessandra Cardini: Velia
- Benito Stefanelli: Alfredo Di Lorenzo
- Mario Castellani: Il Dottore
- Tonino Guerra
