= Claudia Mori =

Italian actress, singer, TV producer (born 1944)

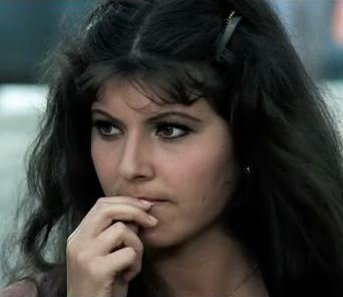
- Mori in Yuppi du (1975)
- Born: Claudia Moroni; 12 February 1944 (age 82); Rome, Kingdom of Italy
- Occupations: Television producer; record producer; actress; singer-songwriter
- Years active: 1959–1985 (actress); 1964–2009 (singer); 1998–present (producer)
- Spouse: Adriano Celentano (m. 1964)
- Children: Rosita Celentano; Giacomo Celentano; Rosalinda Celentano

Claudia Mori (born Claudia Moroni, 12 February 1944) is an Italian producer, retired actress and singer.

== Biography ==
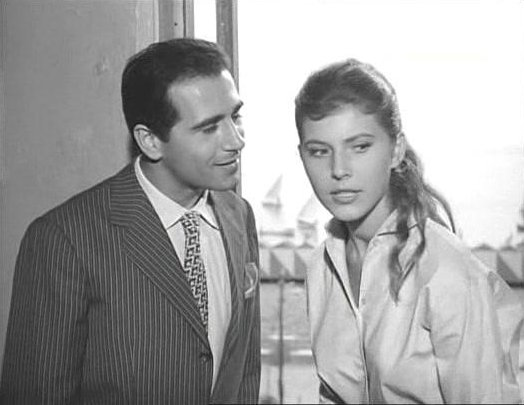
Luigi De Filippo with Claudia Mori in Cerasella (1959)

=== 1960s ===
She began her career in show business as an actress playing in musicals, then in major films such as Rocco and His Brothers by Luchino Visconti and Sodom and Gomorrah by Robert Aldrich.

In 1963, she met Adriano Celentano on the film set of Uno strano tipo. Celentano left his girlfriend Milena Cantù, and in 1964 he secretly married Claudia at the church of San Francesco in Grosseto. She bore three children: Rosita (1965), Giacomo (1966) and Rosalinda (1968).

In 1964, she acted in Super rapina a Milano, the first film directed by Celentano. Thereafter, her acting career was on hiatus, in favor of that as singer. In 1964, with Non guardarmi, she recorded her first album. The flip side of the vinyl record includes a cover of Little Eva's "The Loco-Motion".

She achieved a big success while singing with her husband, in 1967 with "La coppia più bella del mondo" and in 1970, winning the Sanremo Music Festival with "Chi non lavora non fa l'amore".

=== 1970s ===
She returned to the film set many years later, in 1971, with her husband in Er più - Storia d'amore e coltello with Vittorio Caprioli, Romolo Valli, Maurizio Arena and Ninetto Davoli directed by Sergio Corbucci. In 1973, she acted in the film Rugantino, with Adriano Celentano, and played Rosita Flores in L'emigrante, directed by Pasquale Festa Campanile.

In 1972, she performed with her husband and also appeared in the music video of the nonsense song Prisencolinensinainciusol which charted in several European countries.

In 1974, she recorded the album Fuori tempo, collaborating with Paolo Limiti, who wrote the song "Buonasera dottore", sung with Franco Morgan.

In 1975, Claudia participated in Yuppi du, a film directed by Celentano. In the same year, she starred in the film Culastrisce nobile veneziano with Marcello Mastroianni.

Another foray into the world of music was in 1977, with release of the album È amore, with the title song written by Shel Shapiro. It is the first single "Ehi, ehi, ehi", written by Roberto Vecchioni. The LP also contains "Mi vuoi" (written by Ivano Fossati and published the following year on a single version of Marcella Bella) and a cover of Roberto Carlos' "Io bella figlia".

In 1978, she was Marcella in her husband's film Geppo il folle, and in 1979, she took part in the movie Bloodline by Terence Young, with Audrey Hepburn, Ben Gazzara, Irene Papas, Romy Schneider and Omar Sharif.

=== 1980s and 1990s ===
In 1980, she played Mirandolina in the film La locandiera, directed by Paolo Cavara, with Paolo Villaggio and Milena Vukotic. In 1982, Mori returned as a guest at the Sanremo Music Festival, singing the known song "Non succederà più"). The song, which enjoyed some commercial success in Spain, France and Germany, contains a vocal interlude by Adriano Celentano. This success helped the couple at an alleged time of crisis, and therefore the text was understood as autobiographical. In 1988, the song was featured in the Soviet movie Igla (Russian: Игла), starring Viktor Tsoi. In 1984, she released Claudia canta Adriano, an album where she sings her husband's songs. In 1985, she acted in the film Joan Lui - Ma un giorno nel paese arrivo io di lunedì and participated at the Sanremo Music Festival with the song "Chiudi la porta".

In 1989, she hosted the show Du du du with Pino Caruso; in 1991, she became the CEO of the label Clan Celentano, producing her husband's famous albums, as Mina Celentano (1998). In 1994, Claudia participated at the Sanremo Music Festival with the song "Se mi ami", written by Toto Cutugno.

=== Recent activities ===
In 2009, Mori released the Claudia Mori Collection, containing a CD with her greatest hits and a DVD with a Celentano family private movie. In September 2009, she joined the X Factor judging panel, with Mara Maionchi and Morgan.

In the 2010s, she emerged as a TV series and TV movie producer, such as with C'era una volta la città dei matti... ("There Once Was a City of Fools"), with her production company Ciao ragazzi!, winning the Roma FictionFest Special Award for her achievements as a TV producer.

== Discography ==
=== Albums ===
- Fuori tempo (1974)
- È amore (1977)
- Claudia canta Adriano (1984)
- Chiudi la porta (1985)

== Filmography ==
=== As an actress ===
Year	Title	Role	Notes
1959	Cerasella	Cerasella	
1960	Rocco and His Brothers	Laundress	
1960	Il carrozziere	Mirella Lanfranchi	
1962	Sodom and Gomorrah	Maleb	
1962	Of Wayward Love	Bruna	segment: "Le donne"
1963	La leggenda di Fra Diavolo	Luisa	
1963	Ursus in the Land of Fire	Mila	
1963	The Magnificent Adventurer	Piera	
1964	Super rapina a Milano	Wanda	
1965	Un amore e un addio	Lisa Branzeri	
1971	Er Più – storia d'amore e di coltello	Rosa Turbine	
1973	Rugantino	Rosetta	
1973	Little Funny Guy	Rosita Flores	
1975	Yuppi du	Adelaide	
1976	Lunatics and Lovers	Luisa/ Nadia	
1978	Geppo il folle	Gilda	
1979	Bloodline	Donatella	
1980	La locandiera	Mirandolina	
1982	Grand Hotel Excelsior	Hotel guest	
1985	Joan Lui	Tina Foster	

=== As a producer ===
Year	Title	Notes
1998	Treno di panna	feature film
2002	Padri	miniseries
2005	Un anno a primavera	miniseries
2005	De Gasperi, l'uomo della sapienza	miniseries
2007	Rino Gaetano: Ma il cielo è sempre più blu	miniseries
2008	Einstein	television movie
2010	Once Upon a Time the City of Fools	miniseries
2012	Caruso, la voce dell'amore	miniseries
2019	Adrian	animated television series
