= Sweet Movie =

- Theatrical release poster
- Directed by: Dušan Makavejev
- Written by: Dušan Makavejev
- Produced by: Richard Hellman; Vincent Malle
- Starring: Carole Laure; John Vernon; Anna Prucnal; Pierre Clémenti; Jane Mallett; Roy Callender
- Cinematography: Pierre Lhomme
- Edited by: Yann Dedet
- Music by: Manos Hadjidakis
- Production companies: V. M. Productions; Mojack Film; Maran Film GmbH & Co. KG
- Distributed by: AMLF (France)
- Release dates: May 1974 (Cannes); 12 June 1974 (France); 21 March 1975 (Canada); 3 October 1975 (West Germany)
- Running time: 98 minutes
- Countries: France; Canada; West Germany
- Languages: English; French; Italian; Polish; Spanish
- Budget: CAD$700,000

Sweet Movie is a 1974 surrealist erotic black comedy drama film written and directed by Serbian filmmaker Dušan Makavejev.

An international co-production of companies from France, Canada, and West Germany, the film follows two women: a Canadian beauty queen, who represents a modern commodity culture, and a captain aboard a ship laden with candy and sugar, who is a failed communist revolutionary. The film generated significant controversy upon its release, and was banned or partially censored in many countries.

== Plot ==
The first narrative follows Miss Monde 1984/Miss Canada, who wins a contest of the "most virgin"; her prize is the marriage to a milk industry tycoon. However, following his degrading puritanical introduction to intercourse, in which he first disinfects her with isopropyl alcohol and then urinates on her from a gold-painted penis, she vents her intention to leave to her mother-in-law who, at that point, nearly has her killed. The family bodyguard takes her away, further humiliates her, and finally packs her in a trunk bound for Paris. She finds herself on the Eiffel Tower, where she absently meets and has intercourse with a Latin singer, El Macho. The sexual act is interrupted by touring nuns who frighten the lovers into penis captivus. In her post-coital shocked state, she is adopted into an artist community led by Otto Muehl, where she finds affectionate care. The commune practices some liberating sessions, where a member, with the assistance of the others, goes through a (re)birth experience, cries, urinates and defecates like a baby, while the others are cleaning and pampering him. Later she is seen acting for a television advertisement, in which she is naked, covered in liquid chocolate, striking seductive poses and finally drowned in the chocolate.

The second narrative involves a woman, Anna Planeta, piloting a candy-filled boat in the canals of Amsterdam with a large papier-mâché head of Karl Marx on the prow. She picks up the hitchhiking sailor Potemkin (a reference to the 1925 Soviet film Battleship Potemkin), though she warns him that if he falls in love, she will kill him. He ignores her warnings for him to leave and their relationship evolves. In the state of love making, she stabs him to death in their nidus made of sugar. She then seduces children into her world of sweets and revolution, eventually getting arrested by the Dutch police who lay down plastic sacks containing the children's bodies on the side of the canal—implying they too have been murdered by Planeta. The film ends with the children, unseen by the others, being reborn from their plastic cocoons.

== Cast ==
- Carole Laure as Miss Monde 1984/Miss Canada
- Anna Prucnal as Captain Anna Planeta
- Pierre Clémenti as Potemkin Sailor
- John Vernon as Aristote/ M. Kapital
- Jane Mallett as Mrs. Alplanalpe/ Aristote's mother
- Roy Callender as Jeremiah Muscle/ Mrs. Alplanalpe's bodyguard
- Sami Frey as El Macho
- Otto Muehl as Member of Therapie-Komune
- Marpessa Dawn as Mama Communa
- Renate Steiger as herself
- Don Arioli as Dr. Mittlefinger
- Roland Topor
- George Melly
- Catherine Sola
- Sabine Haudepin
- Robin Gammell
- Vivian Vachon

== Production ==
The film was originally intended to focus solely on the experiences of Miss Canada. However, the actress portraying the character, Carole Laure, left the production after becoming increasingly disgusted over the actions required for her performance; she decided to quit after shooting a scene in which she fondled a man's penis on-screen. After Laure's departure, Makavejev rewrote the script to include the second narrative, starring Anna Prucnal.

Filming took place in Amsterdam, Montréal, Paris and Germany.

== Reception ==
The film generated significant controversy upon its release, with scenes of coprophilia, emetophilia, implied child molestation, and footage of real-life remains of the Polish Katyn Massacre victims. The film had its North American premiere at the inaugural Telluride Film Festival in 1974. The 5 April 1976 issue of Time mentioned Sweet Movie as an example of the "porno plague" allegedly spreading in the United States. The film was banned in many countries, including the United Kingdom, where the film was considered “unsuitable for classification” by the British Board of Film Classification, or severely cut. Polish authorities banned Anna Prucnal—a Warsaw-born Polish citizen—from using her passport due to her involvement in the film, preventing her from entering Poland for several years.

Makavejev said: "After Sweet Movie it was as if I had burned all my bridges. I just lost the chance to talk to producers."

=== Critical response ===
"Sweet Movie tackles the limits of personal and political freedom with kaleidoscopic feverishness, shuttling viewers from a gynecological beauty pageant to a grotesque food orgy with scatological, taboo-shattering glee."

The film received mixed reviews from critics. On the review aggregator website Rotten Tomatoes, the film holds a 50% approval rating based on 22 reviews, with an average rating of 5.4/10.

American philosopher Steven Shaviro commented that, in Sweet Movie, Makavejev went where no filmmaker had gone but the film is "too intellectual to be ecstatic [and] too visceral to be theorizable", and that "certain questions [Sweet Movie] asks simply can't be answered", such as whether the practices seen in Otto Muehl's commune were genuinely liberating or forced by the commune's groupthink.

Sweet Movie: Poems, a winner of the 2022 National Poetry Series by poet Alisha Dietzman, is an ekphrasis of the film. The book mirrors "the uncertain, unstable tenor of Dušan Makavejev’s controversial avant-garde film Sweet Movie."

=== Home media ===
The film was nearly impossible to find since its initial release in 1974, until The Criterion Collection released the film on DVD in a region 1 DVD in 2007.

== See also ==
- Salò, or the 120 Days of Sodom
- Pink Flamingos
- W.R.: Mysteries of the Organism
- List of mainstream films with unsimulated sex
