= Donatella Damiani =

Italian actress (born 1958)

Donatella Damiani (born Donatella Casula on 3 June 1956) is an Italian actress and model. She is best known for her role in the 1980 Federico Fellini film The City of Women, in which she played a woman who is sweet, protective, seductive and by her own admission, "full of contradictions." Damiani quickly rose to fame as an Italian sex symbol in the 1980s, featuring in pictorials such as the June 1980 edition of Playboy and the March 1985 edition of Playmen.

== Filmography ==
- How to Seduce Your Teacher (La liceale seduce i professori) - 1979
- The City of Women (La città delle donne) - 1980
- I Don't Understand You Anymore (Non ti conosco più amore) - 1980
- I carabbinieri - 1981
- Honey (Miele di donna) - 1981
- Vigili e vigilesse - 1982
- Grog - 1982
- Hanna D. - The Girl from Vondel Park (Hanna D. - La ragazza del Vondel Park) - 1984
- Lola's Secret (Il peccato di Lola) - 1985
