= When Women Lost Their Tails =

1972 film

- Directed by: Pasquale Festa Campanile
- Written by: Marcello Coscia; Pasquale Festa Campanile; Ottavio Jemma
- Story by: Lina Wertmüller
- Cinematography: Silvano Ippoliti
- Edited by: Nino Baragli
- Music by: Ennio Morricone; Bruno Nicolai
- Release date: 24 February 1972
- Country: Italy
- Language: Italian

When Women Lost Their Tails (Italian: Quando le donne persero la coda) is a 1972 Italian fantasy-comedy film directed by Pasquale Festa Campanile. It is the sequel of When Women Had Tails.

== Cast ==
- Senta Berger: Filli
- Lando Buzzanca: Ham
- Frank Wolff: Grr
- Renzo Montagnani: Maluc
- Lino Toffolo: Put
- Mario Adorf: Pap
- Aldo Puglisi: Zog
- Francesco Mulé: Uto
- Fiammetta Baralla: Katorcia
