= Bloody Payroll =

- Italian film poster for Bloody Payroll
- Directed by: Mario Caiano
- Screenplay by: Mario Caiano
- Story by: Mario Caiano
- Produced by: Renato Angiolini
- Starring: Claudio Cassinelli; Silvia Dionisio; Elio Zamuto; Vittorio Mezzogiorno
- Cinematography: Pier Luigi Santi
- Edited by: Renato Cinquini
- Music by: Pulsar Music Ltd.
- Production company: Jarama Film
- Release date: March 5, 1976 (Italy)
- Country: Italy
- Box office: ₤1.015 billion

Bloody Payroll (Italian: Milano violenta) is a 1976 Italian noir-poliziotteschi crime film written and directed by Mario Caiano. Author Roberto Curti described the film as more of a film noir than a poliziottesco.

== Cast ==
- Claudio Cassinelli as Raul Montalbani, aka "The Cat"
- Silvia Dionisio as Layla
- John Steiner as Fausto
- Vittorio Mezzogiorno as Walter
- Elio Zamuto as Police Commissioner Foschi
- Biagio Pelligra as Tropea
- Salvatore Puntillo as Inspector Tucci

== Release ==
Bloody Payroll was shown in Italy on March 5, 1976. It grossed a total of 1,015,886,510 Italian lire.

The score of the film is credited to Pulsar Music Ltd. It is a funk styled score performed by pianist Enrico Pieranunzi and guitarist Silvano Chimenti.

== See also ==
- List of Italian films of 1976

== Notes ==
=== References ===
- Curti, Roberto (2013). Italian Crime Filmography, 1968-1980. McFarland. ISBN 978-0786469765.
