= Vincenzo Siniscalchi =

Italian politician (1931–2024)

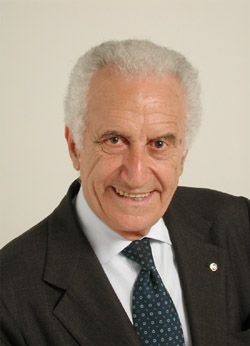
- Vincenzo Siniscalchi

Member of the Chamber of Deputies of Italy for Campania 1
- In office 25 October 1995 – 27 April 2006

Personal details
- Born: 7 August 1931 Naples, Italy
- Died: 12 February 2024 (aged 92) Naples, Italy
- Party: PDS (1995–1998); DS (1998–2007)
- Education: University of Naples Federico II
- Occupation: Lawyer

Vincenzo Siniscalchi (7 August 1931 – 12 February 2024) was an Italian lawyer and politician. A member of the Democratic Party of the Left and the Democrats of the Left, he served in the Chamber of Deputies of Italy from 1995 to 2006.

Siniscalchi died in Naples on 12 February 2024, at the age of 92.
