= Avec Amour (Anna Prucnal album) =

Studio album by Anna Prucnal
- Released: 1981

Avec Amour is the 1981 third album of French singer Anna Prucnal.

== Track listing ==
1. Histoire d'amour
2. Cède le passage
3. La Complainte du partisan
4. À la belle saison
5. L'Exilée (theme for Costa-Gavras film version of the novel Clair de femme)
6. Trois œillets rouges
7. Che
8. Tes Amours de quarantaine
9. La Voleuse
10. Fuite
