= Sara Sperati =

Italian film actress (born 1956)

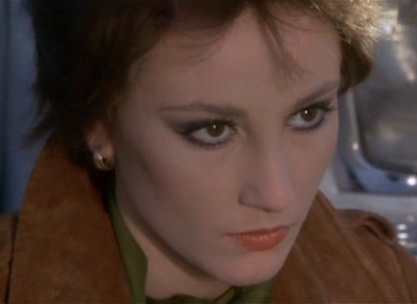
Sperati in Killer Cop (1975)

Sara Sperati (born October 7, 1956), born as Adele Sperati, was an Italian film actress.

She was a minor starlet in 1970s Italian genre films.

== Selected filmography ==
- The Devil Is a Woman (1974, as Adele Sperati)
- La nottata (1974)
- I figli di nessuno (1974)
- Mark of the Cop (1975)
- Killer Cop (1975)
- Salon Kitty (1976)
- Deported Women of the SS Special Section (1976)
