= Osiride Pevarello =

Italian actor

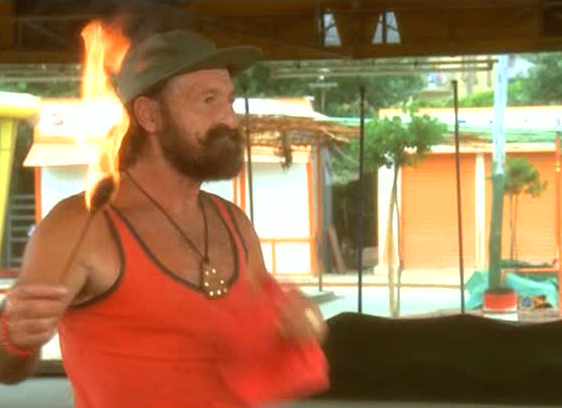
- Osiride Pevarello in the 1975 film Loaded Guns
- Born: 26 July 1920; Montagnana
- Died: 15 December 2016 (aged 96); Ostia, Rome
- Occupation: Actor

Osiride Pevarello (26 July 1920 – 15 December 2016) was an Italian actor. His brother is Renzo Pevarello.

== Selected filmography ==
- The Mill on the Po (1949)
- Gladiators Seven (1964) - Gladiator (uncredited)
- The Triumph of Hercules (1964) - Soldier (uncredited)
- The Two Gladiators (1964)
- Revolt of the Praetorians (1964) - Fireflasher (uncredited)
- The Magnificent Gladiator (1964) - Attalus' Companion Freeing Emperor (uncredited)
- Buffalo Bill, Hero of the Far West (1965) - Cowboy in Saloon (uncredited)
- Letti sbagliati (1965) - The Man with the Dog (segment "Il complicato") (uncredited)
- Blood for a Silver Dollar (1965)
- Two Sergeants of General Custer (1965) - Brawler
- Adiós gringo (1965) - Ranchester Cowboy (uncredited)
- Bob Fleming... Mission Casablanca (1966) - Brawler (uncredited)
- Password: Kill Agent Gordon (1966) - Thug (uncredited)
- Knives of the Avenger (1966) - Hagen's Henchman (uncredited)
- Yankee (1966)
- The Hills Run Red (1966) - Mendez Henchman (uncredited)
- Sugar Colt (1966) - Man in Saloon (uncredited)
- Thompson 1880 (1966) - Augustine - Brady's henchman
- Django Shoots First (1966) - Drunkard (uncredited)
- Up the MacGregors! (1967) - Bandit (uncredited)
- Wanted (1967) - Hitman (uncredited)
- Pecos Cleans Up (1967)
- Seven Pistols for a Massacre (1967) - Blacksmith (uncredited)
- Son of Django (1967) - Bum, Eyepatch Henchman (uncredited)
- The Magnificent Texan (1967) - Stark Henchman (uncredited)
- 2 RRRingos no Texas (1967) - Sentenza Jane Henchman (uncredited)
- Any Gun Can Play (1967) - Montero Gang Member (uncredited)
- The Dirty Outlaws (1967) - Piano Player (uncredited)
- Bandidos (1967) - Saloon Patron (uncredited)
- Face to Face (1967) - Blacksmith of Willow Creek (uncredited)
- Red Blood, Yellow Gold (1967) - Bandit in Tavern (uncredited)
- Two Faces of the Dollar (1967) - Bandit with the Mexican (uncredited)
- Marinai in coperta (1967) - Man with Beard in the Pub (uncredited)
- Vengeance Is My Forgiveness (1968) - Juan (uncredited)
- Vengeance Is Mine (1968) - Member of Jurago's gang
- A Minute to Pray, a Second to Die (1968) - Fuzzy
- Hate Thy Neighbor (1968) - Bearded gang member (uncredited)
- Man Who Cried for Revenge (1968) - Thomas (uncredited)
- Run, Man, Run (1968) - Blacksmith of Burton City (uncredited)
- The Longest Hunt (1968) - Fuertas
- Kill Them All and Come Back Alone (1968) - Soldier (uncredited)
- God Will Forgive My Pistol (1969) - Clanton Henchman (uncredited)
- Fellini Satyricon (1969) - Soldier Killing the Emperor (uncredited)
- The Five Man Army (1969) - Full-Bearded Singing Mexican (uncredited)
- The Forgotten Pistolero (1969) - Hitman (uncredited)
- Agguato sul Bosforo (1969) - Bearded brawler in bar (uncredited)
- Django the Bastard (1969) - Nick / Fuzzy (uncredited)
- And God Said to Cain (1970) - Pedro (uncredited)
- Chuck Moll (1970) - Flaming Bill (uncredited)
- Shango (1970) - Bandit (uncredited)
- The Howl (1970) - Cannibal philosopher
- Roy Colt & Winchester Jack (1970) - Reverend's Henchman (uncredited)
- Chapagua (1970)
- Fighters from Ave Maria (1970) - Fighter in Saloon (uncredited)
- They Call Me Trinity (1970) - Gioele (uncredited)
- Nights and Loves of Don Juan (1971) - One of Aiscia's Wardens (uncredited)
- Long Live Robin Hood (1971) - Man at wedding ceremony (uncredited)
- His Name Was King (1971) - One of Foster's deputies (uncredited)
- Riuscirà l'avvocato Franco Benenato a sconfiggere il suo acerrimo nemico il pretore Ciccio De Ingras? (1971) - Uomo nel saloon (uncredited)
- La vacanza (1971) - Olindo
- The Price of Death (1971) - Goldseeker (uncredited)
- Trinity Is Still My Name (1971) - Hitman (uncredited)
- Blackie the Pirate (1971)
- Ben and Charlie (1972) - Brawler (uncredited)
- Panhandle 38 (1972) - Joe Henchman
- Two Brothers in Trinity (1972) - Outlaw #2
- Trinity and Sartana Are Coming (1972) - Mexican Soldier at Fort (uncredited)
- Two Sons of Trinity (1972) -Chun Chin Champa Henchman (uncredited)
- Therefore It Is (1972) - Townsman during Fire (uncredited)
- Man of the East (1972) - Brawler (uncredited)
- Life Is Tough, Eh Providence? (1972) - James Henchman (uncredited)
- Alleluja & Sartana are Sons... Sons of God (1972) - Wolf Henchman with Beard (uncredited)
- Those Dirty Dogs (1973) - Sergeant in Dormitory Fistfight (uncredited)
- Fra' Tazio da Velletri (1973) - Farmer (uncredited)
- The Three Musketeers of the West (1973) - Fireeater (uncredited)
- Flatfoot (1973) - Thug with Beard (uncredited)
- Mean Frank and Crazy Tony (1973) - Thug in Prison (uncredited)
- The Fighting Fist of Shanghai Joe (1973) - False Teeth - Ranch Hand
- Man with the Golden Winchester (1973) - Soldier (uncredited)
- Sgarro alla camorra (1973)
- The Arena (1974) - (uncredited)
- Watch Out, We're Mad! (1974) - Gymnast (uncredited)
- The Hand That Feeds the Dead (1974) - Inn-Keeper
- Lover of the Monster (1974) - Polanski
- Loaded Guns (1975) - Don Calò Henchman (uncredited)
- Flatfoot in Hong Kong (1975) - Cook in street (uncredited)
- Carambola's Philosophy: In the Right Pocket (1975) - Photographer (uncredited)
- Return of Shanghai Joe (1975) - Hitman (uncredited)
- Legend of the Sea Wolf (1975)
- The Exorcist: Italian Style (1975) - Uomo al garage di Pasquale (uncredited)
- Soldier of Fortune (1976) - Soldato francese (uncredited)
- Salon Kitty (1976) - Man with Indian Costume in Salon (uncredited)
- The Big Racket (1976) - Sentry (uncredited)
- Crime Busters (1977) - Circus Man (uncredited)
- They Called Him Bulldozer (1978) - Waiter (uncredited)
- The Sheriff and the Satellite Kid (1979) - Party Participant (uncredited)
- Caligula (1979) - Giant
- Action (1980) - Detenuto (uncredited)
- Flatfoot in Egypt (1980) - Temple's Guard (uncredited)
- Buddy Goes West (1981) - Lavoratory Worker (uncredited)
- Bomber (1982) - Cook (uncredited)
- Ator 2 - L'invincibile Orion (1982) - Sandur
- Thor the Conqueror (1983) - Barbarian (uncredited)
- Pappa e ciccia (1983) - The Head of the Alpini (second story) (uncredited)
- The Key (1983)
- Rush (1983) - Homer
- Miranda (1985) - Man That Sings in Bar (uncredited)
- Capriccio (1987) - Serse
- Paprika (1991) - Remo
- All Ladies Do It (1992) - Passenger on the Bus
- Monella (1998)
- Senso '45 (2002) - (final film role)
