= Fortunato Arena =

Italian stuntman and actor (1922–1994)

- Born: 3 May 1922; Catanzaro, Italy
- Died: 7 March 1994 (aged 71); Rome, Italy
- Occupation: Actor
- Years active: 1954–1989

Fortunato Arena (23 May 1922 – 7 March 1994) was an Italian stuntman and actor who appeared in more than one hundred films from 1954 to 1989.

== Selected filmography ==
- Theodora, Slave Empress (1954) – Una guardia (uncredited)
- Ben-Hur (1959) – Soldier (uncredited)
- The Giant of Marathon (1959) – Mate (uncredited)
- Carthage in Flames (1960) – Soldier on Hiram's Ship (uncredited)
- The Cossacks (1960) – Cossack (uncredited)
- Tough Guys (1960) – Un gangster (uncredited)
- Five Branded Women (1960) – Un partigiano alla rasatura (uncredited)
- The Giants of Thessaly (1960) – Argonaut (uncredited)
- The Thief of Baghdad (1961) – Prison Guards' Captain (uncredited)
- Don Camillo: Monsignor (1961) – Truck Driver (uncredited)
- Dynamite Jack (1961)
- Totò Diabolicus (1962) – Private Guard (uncredited)
- Samson Against the Sheik (1962) – Fighter (uncredited)
- Colossus of the Arena (1962) – Gladiator (uncredited)
- I Am Semiramis (1963) – Captain of the Guard (uncredited)
- Torpedo Bay (1963) – Italian Marine
- Hercules, Samson and Ulysses (1963) – Eriphos
- Hercules vs. Moloch (1963) – Gladiator Instructor
- Terror of the Steppes (1964) – Soldato di Sandar Khan (uncredited)
- Thunder of Battle (1964) – Domestico (uncredited)
- The Terror of Rome Against the Son of Hercules (1964) – One of Maciste's Accomplices (uncredited)
- Temple of the White Elephant (1964) – Sect Member (uncredited)
- Gladiators Seven (1964) – Gladiator (uncredited)
- Hero of Rome (1964) – Etruscan Soldier
- Maciste in King Solomon's Mines (1964) – Prisoner in the Mines (uncredited)
- Messalina vs. the Son of Hercules (1964) – Bearded Soldier / Attacker (uncredited)
- The Triumph of Hercules (1964) – Archer (uncredited)
- The Two Gladiators (1964)
- The Secret Invasion (1964) – Sailor Firing Signal Rocket (uncredited)
- Attack and Retreat (1964) – Italian Soldier (uncredited)
- The Revenge of Spartacus (1964) – Roman Mercenary (uncredited)
- I pirati della Malesia (1964) – English Officer (uncredited)
- Spartacus and the Ten Gladiators (1964) – Prison Warden (uncredited)
- Revenge of The Gladiators (1964) – Guard (uncredited)
- The Magnificent Gladiator (1964) – Gladiator (uncredited)
- Erik, the Viking (1965) – Thormann
- Conqueror of Atlantis (1965) – Golden Ghost Man (uncredited)
- Maciste, the Avenger of the Mayans (1965) – Manur warrior
- Treasure of the Petrified Forest (1965) – Nibelung Warrior (uncredited)
- Blood for a Silver Dollar (1965) – Juez
- Captain from Toledo (1965) – Spanish Grande (uncredited)
- 008: Operation Exterminate (1965) – Kemp's Henchman
- The Agony and the Ecstasy (1965) – Pope's Bodyguard (uncredited)
- Slalom (1965) – Thug with Knife (uncredited)
- Bob Fleming... Mission Casablanca (1966) – Brawler (uncredited)
- The Mona Lisa Has Been Stolen (1966) – Servant de Romeo
- Due mafiosi contro Al Capone (1966) – Minasi's Henchman #1
- Seven Dollars on the Red (1966) – Prisoner (uncredited)
- An Angel for Satan (1966) – Tavern Customer (uncredited)
- Per un pugno di canzoni (1966) – Gangster
- Ringo and His Golden Pistol (1966) – Perez Henchman (uncredited)
- Killer's Carnival (1966) – Taxi Driver (Rome segment) (uncredited)
- Johnny Yuma (1966) – Poker Player (uncredited)
- For a Few Dollars Less (1966) – Poker Player (uncredited)
- Missione apocalisse (1966) – Francis
- Jim Golden Poker (1966) – Dallas, Gang Boss (uncredited)
- The Hills Run Red (1966)
- Sugar Colt (1966) – Man in Saloon (uncredited)
- Django Shoots First (1966) – Cluster Gunman (uncredited)
- Navajo Joe (1966) – Townsman (uncredited)
- Two Sons of Ringo (1966) – Indio's Right Hand (uncredited)
- Superargo Versus Diabolicus (1966) – Pirate in Speedboat (uncredited)
- Sheriff with the Gold (1966) – Vargas
- The Good, the Bad and the Ugly (1966) – 1st Sombrero Onlooker at Tuco's 1st Hanging (uncredited)
- Un dollaro tra i denti (1967) – Captain Cordoba
- Snow Devils (1967) – Snow Devil (uncredited)
- How We Stole the Atomic Bomb (1967)
- Up the MacGregors! (1967) – Bandit (uncredited)
- Wanted (1967) – Poorland Barman (uncredited)
- Wanted Johnny Texas (1967) – O'Connor's Gunman (uncredited)
- The Million Dollar Countdown (1967)
- The Handsome, the Ugly, and the Stupid (1967) – Mexican
- The Stranger Returns (1967) – En Plein Henchman at Water Trough
- Killer Kid (1967) – José (uncredited)
- Two Faces of the Dollar (1967) – Mexican Bandit (uncredited)
- A Minute to Pray, a Second to Die (1967) – Poker player
- If You Want to Live... Shoot! (1968) – Lookout
- Kommissar X – Drei blaue Panther (1968) – Second Killer with Harpoon (uncredited)
- Vengeance Is My Forgiveness (1968) – Bandit brought to Sheriff (uncredited)
- Una forca per un bastardo (1968) – Ciudadano
- I Live for Your Death (1968) – Gambler (uncredited)
- Long Days of Hate (1968) – Carl
- Psychopath (1968) – Little John from Tunisia (uncredited)
- Madigan's Millions (1968) – Partoni
- Donne... botte e bersaglieri (1968) – Gangster (uncredited)
- Man Who Cried for Revenge (1968) – Crazy Joe
- Chiedi Perdono a Dio... Non a Me (1968) – Man carrying a corpse on his back (uncredited)
- Day After Tomorrow (1968) – Trent
- If You Meet Sartana Pray for Your Death (1968) – Tampico Gang Member (uncredited)
- Il lungo giorno del massacro (1968) – Green (uncredited)
- The Longest Hunt (1968) – Sheriff
- Cry of Death (1968)
- The Great Silence (1968) – Outlaw (uncredited)
- Time and Place for Killing (1968) – Mulligan Henchman #1
- I quattro del pater noster (1969) – Uomo di scorta alla diligenza
- Hate Is My God (1969) – Sheriff Henchman
- The Five Man Army (1969) – Execution Squad Commander (uncredited)
- Tarzana, the Wild Girl (1969)
- Texas Calibre 38 (1969) – Stagecoach Driver (uncredited)
- Sabata (1969) – Henchman at Ranch (uncredited)
- Django the Bastard (1969) – Murdok Henchman (uncredited)
- Zorro marchese di Navarra (1969) – French Sergeant
- Poppea's Hot Nights (1969) – Soldier Cila
- Quintana: Dead or Alive (1969) – Prison Warden (uncredited)
- Franco, Ciccio e il pirata Barbanera (1969) – Timoniere
- Franco e Ciccio... Ladro e Guardia (1969)
- Sartana the Gravedigger (1969)
- The Unholy Four (1970) – Asylum Warden (uncredited)
- The Most Beautiful Wife (1970)
- Shango (1970) – Martinez Soldier (uncredited)
- Django Defies Sartana (1970) – Bandit (uncredited)
- Sartana's Here… Trade Your Pistol for a Coffin (1970) – Old man (uncredited)
- Adiós, Sabata (1970)
- Have a Good Funeral, My Friend... Sartana Will Pay (1970) – Casino Troublemaker (uncredited)
- They Call Me Trinity (1970) – Barman (uncredited)
- The Statue (1971) – Customs officer (uncredited)
- Cose di Cosa Nostra (1971) – Un picciotto di Manzano
- Brother Outlaw (1971) – Jackson
- Here's Django... Pay or Die! (1971) – Poker player (uncredited)
- Nights and Loves of Don Juan (1971) – One of Aiscia's Wardens (uncredited)
- L'arciere di fuoco (1971) – Un villager (uncredited)
- The Last Traitor (1971) – Judge Stump
- They Call Me Hallelujah (1971) – Sheriff of Yucca
- Summer Affair (1971) – Truck Driver
- Tara Pokì (1971) – Alphonso
- Riuscirà il nostro eroe a ritrovare il più grande diamante del mondo? (1971) – Brett
- Shoot the Living and Pray for the Dead (1971) – Coachman
- Il ritorno del gladiatore più forte del mondo (1971) – A Soldier with Caio Appio (uncredited)
- Return of Sabata (1971) – Saloon Owner (uncredited)
- The Price of Death (1971) – Hangman (uncredited)
- Armiamoci e partite! (1971) – German Soldier
- They Call Him Cemetery (1971) – Ambusher (uncredited)
- W Django! (1971) – Townsman (uncredited)
- Trinity Is Still My Name (1971) – Parker Henchman
- Blindman (1971) – Mexican Officer
- Ripped Off (1972)
- Brother Sun, Sister Moon (1972) – Assisi Inhabitant (uncredited)
- His Name Was Holy Ghost (1972) – Colonel
- Without Family (1972) – prof. Pampardella
- Seminò morte... lo chiamavano il Castigo di Dio! (1972) – Card Player (não creditado)
- Who Killed the Prosecutor and Why? (1972) – Don Salvatore Aniello
- Il sindacalista (1972) – Worker (uncredited)
- Two Brothers in Trinity (1972) – Outlaw (uncredited)
- Spirito Santo e le 5 magnifiche canaglie (1972) – 1st killer
- Bada alla tua pelle Spirito Santo! (1972) – Suomi's Father
- Blood Story (1972) – Sam
- Trinità e Sartana figli di... (1972) – Sheriff (uncredited)
- Two Sons of Trinity (1972) – Jack Gordon
- Man Called Amen (1972) – Stagecoach Driver (uncredited)
- Naughty Nun (1972) – (uncredited)
- Return of Halleluja (1972) – Sheriff with Fishes
- Man of the East (1972) – Danny Dillman
- Metti lo diavolo tuo ne lo mio inferno (1972) – Buoncostume Mayor
- The Assassin of Rome (1972) – Caccavallo
- Meo Patacca (1972)
- Holy God, Here Comes the Passatore! (1973) – servitore di villa Casadei
- Sono stato io! (1973) – Carcerato (uncredited)
- Even Angels Eat Beans (1973) – Policeman
- Man Called Invincible (1973) – Tangarango (uncredited)
- Counselor at Crime (1973) – Uomo di Garofalo
- Mean Frank and Crazy Tony (1973) – Prison Warden (uncredited)
- Corte marziale (1973) – Farmer (uncredited)
- Bad Kids of the West (1973) – Sheriff
- Patroclooo!... e il soldato Camillone, grande grosso e frescone (1973) – Padre di Tamara
- ...e continuavano a mettere lo diavolo ne lo inferno (1973) – Podestà
- Cry of a Prostitute (1974) – Killer (uncredited)
- Without Family (1972) – prof. Pampardella
- Seminò morte... lo chiamavano il Castigo di Dio! (1972) – Card Player (não creditado)
- Who Killed the Prosecutor and Why? (1972) – Don Salvatore Aniello
- Il sindacalista (1972) – Worker (uncredited)
- Two Brothers in Trinity (1972) – Outlaw (uncredited)
- Spirito Santo e le 5 magnifiche canaglie (1972) – 1st killer
- Bada alla tua pelle Spirito Santo! (1972) – Suomi's Father
- Blood Story (1972) – Sam
- Trinità e Sartana figli di... (1972) – Sheriff (uncredited)
- Two Sons of Trinity (1972) – Jack Gordon
- Man Called Amen (1972) – Stagecoach Driver (uncredited)
- Naughty Nun (1972) – (uncredited)
- Return of Halleluja (1972) – Sheriff with Fishes
- Man of the East (1972) – Danny Dillman
- Metti lo diavolo tuo ne lo mio inferno (1972) – Buoncostume Mayor
- The Assassin of Rome (1972) – Caccavallo
- Meo Patacca (1972)
- Holy God, Here Comes the Passatore! (1973) – servitore di villa Casadei
- Sono stato io! (1973) – Carcerato (uncredited)
- Even Angels Eat Beans (1973) – Policeman
- Man Called Invincible (1973) – Tangarango (uncredited)
- Counselor at Crime (1973) – Uomo di Garofalo
- Mean Frank and Crazy Tony (1973) – Prison Warden (uncredited)
- Corte marziale (1973) – Farmer (uncredited)
- Bad Kids of the West (1973) – Sheriff
- Patroclooo!... e il soldato Camillone, grande grosso e frescone (1973) – Padre di Tamara
- ...e continuavano a mettere lo diavolo ne lo inferno (1973) – Podestà
- Bread and Chocolate (1974) – Shantytowner (uncredited)
- Di Tresette ce n'è uno, tutti gli altri son nessuno (1974) – Frisco Joe Henchman (uncredited)
- The Godfather Squad (1974) – Leader of Attackers at Parking Lot
- Charleston (1974) – Peluso, Chestnut Seller
- Return of Shanghai Joe (1975) – Sheriff Wilson
- Silent Action (1975) – Man Draging Body of Scanni (uncredited)
- Salvo D'Acquisto (1975)
- La peccatrice (1975) – Old Miner
- Due cuori, una cappella (1975) – Vigile urbano (uncredited)
- La liceale (1975) – Policeman (uncredited)
- The Diamond Peddlers (1976) – Cashier
- Confessions of a Lady Cop (1976) – Man Falling Into the Fountain (uncredited)
- The Con Artists (1976) – Philip's Accomplice
- Crimebusters (1976) – Mobster (uncredited)
- A Special Cop in Action (1976) – Morel
- The Last Round (1976) – Rico Henchman (uncredited)
- The Lady Medic (1976) – Worker (uncredited)
- The Cynic, the Rat and the Fist (1977) – Large Jail Hood
- Destruction Force (1977) – Il tassinaro
- Crime Busters (1977) – Bouncer at Bowling
- Kakkientruppen (1977) – Soldier 'Marlene'
- A Man Called Magnum (1977) – Bank Robber
- Swindle (1977) – Porter (uncredited)
- Il... Belpaese (1977) – The Restaurateur (uncredited)
- The Bloodstained Shadow (1978) – Antonio, Innkeeper (uncredited)
- Brothers Till We Die (1978) – Male Nurse
- They Called Him Bulldozer (1978) – Osvaldo's Thug #2 (uncredited)
- Pugni, dollari e spinaci (1978) – Gangster (uncredited)
- Brillantina Rock (1979)
- From Hell to Victory (1979) – Soldato Anziano (uncredited)
- Calígula (1979) – Roman (uncredited)
- S*H*E (1980) – Paesano
- Kenn' ich, weiß ich, war ich schon! (1981) – Don Erminio
- The Salamander (1981) – General Pantaleone
- Ciao nemico (1982) – Santoni
- Gunan, King of the Barbarians (1982) – Mevian
- Giovani, belle... probabilmente ricche (1982) – Edicolante (uncredited)
- Due strani papà (1984) – Uomo al tavolo da poker (uncredited)
- Good King Dagobert (1984) – Man in Tavern (uncredited)
