= Suicide Mission to Singapore =

- Directed by: Ferdinando Baldi
- Written by: Ferdinando Baldi; María del Carmen Martínez Román
- Starring: Stelio Candelli; Yoko Tani
- Cinematography: Emilio Foriscot
- Music by: Carlo Savina
- Release date: June 3, 1966 (Italy)
- Language: Italian

Suicide Mission to Singapore (Italian: Goldsnake Anonima Killers, Spanish: Singapur hora cero, French: Mission suicide à Singapour, also known as Goldsnake) is a 1966 Italian-Spanish-French Eurospy film shot on location in Singapore that was written and directed by Ferdinando Baldi. It was the first role as absolute protagonist for Stelio Candelli (credited as Stanley Kent), who shortly before had appeared in another spy film, Secret Agent 777, as a villain.

== Plot ==
A Chinese scientist somewhere in Singapore has developed very small atomic weapons. The US sends agent Kurt Jackson who is up against criminal organisations who want to sell the scientist to the highest bidder as well as the Red Chinese.

== Cast ==
- Stelio Candelli as Kurt Jackson
- Annabella Incontrera as Evelyne
- Yoko Tani as Annie Wong
- Juan Cortés as Jean
- Salleh Melan as Gordo

== Soundtrack ==
The score was composed by Carlo Savina who had composed the scores of Secret Agent Fireball (1965) and its sequel Bob Fleming... Mission Casablanca (1966).

- The theme song "Goldsnake" is performed by Iva Zanicchi.
- Yoko Tani as a lounge singer sings Crazy in the film.
