= Annabella Incontrera =

Italian film and television actress (1943–2004)

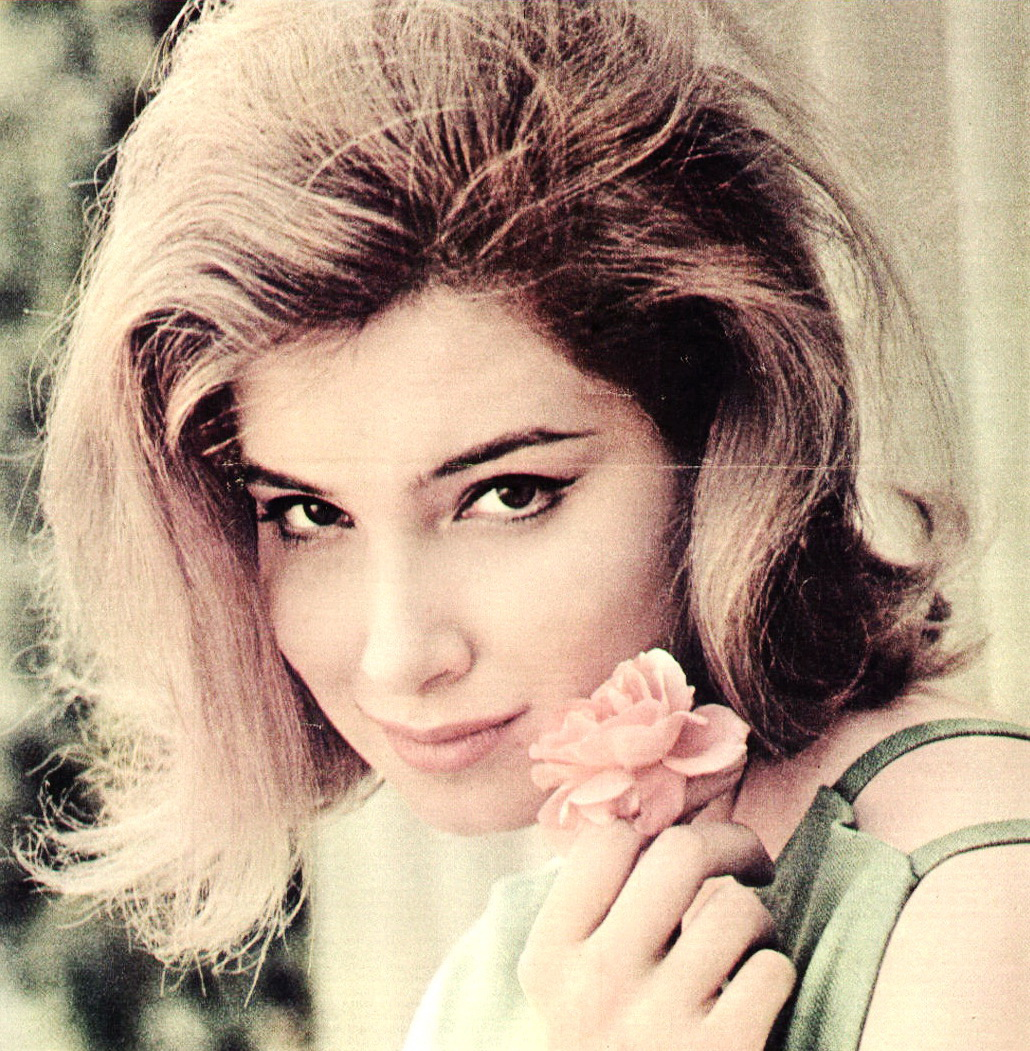
Incontrera in 1962

Annabella Incontrera (11 June 1943 – 19 September 2004), sometimes credited as Pam Stevenson, was an Italian film and television actress.

== Career ==
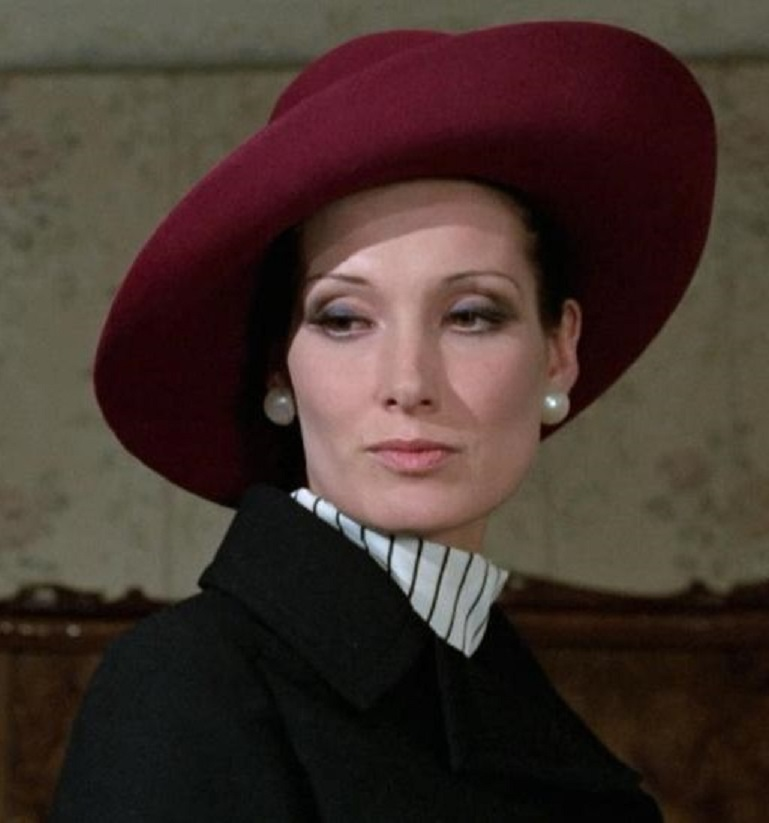
Incontrera in So Sweet, So Dead (1972)

Born in Milan, Italy, Incontrera attended the Centro Sperimentale di Cinematografia without finishing the course. She made her film debut at 16, in Love Now, Pay Later (L'inferno addosso, 1959), and appeared in about 40 films, mostly in secondary roles.

== Personal life ==
In 1969, she married Guglielmo Biraghi, film critic for the newspaper Il Messaggero, but they divorced a few years later.

She was romantically involved with the married British Labour Party politician Geoffrey Robinson, who in the 1970s was a businessman in charge of the Italian offshoot of British Leyland, and was reputedly introduced to his colleagues as 'Signora Robinson'.

The actress suffered from a severe form of osteoporosis for years, and was forced to use a wheelchair.

== Filmography ==
- Love Now, Pay Later (1959) – Micki
- Maciste contro il vampiro (1961) – Magda
- Una domenica d'estate (1962) – Lilly
- L'uomo che bruciò il suo cadavere (1964)
- Suicide Mission to Singapore (1966) – Evelyne
- The Devil in Love (1966, directed by Ettore Scola) – Lucrezia
- Poker with Pistols (1967, directed by Giuseppe Vari) – Lola
- The Ambushers (1967) – Slaygirl
- Quella carogna di Frank Mitraglia (1968) – Eva
- A suon di lupara (1968) – Lucienne
- The Assassination Bureau (1969) – Eleanora Spado
- Une fille nommée Amour (1969) – Cécile, la soeur
- Double Face (1969) – Liz
- A Bullet for Sandoval (1969) – Carol Day
- Challenge of the McKennas (1970) – Maggie
- Due ragazzi da marciapiede (1970) – Matilde
- Commando di spie (1970) – Madeleine
- Amore Formula 2 (1970) – Loreley
- Nights and Loves of Don Juan (1971) – Maddalena
- I pirati dell'isola verde (1971) – Isabella
- Return of Sabata (1971) – Maggie, Saloon Girl
- Black Belly of the Tarantula (1971) – Mirta Ricci
- When Men Carried Clubs and Women Played Ding-Dong (1971) – Prehistoric woman (uncredited)
- Roma Bene (1971, directed by Carlo Lizzani) – La Lesbica
- The Beasts (1971, episode Processo a porte chiuse) – Carmela Sparapaoli (segment "Processo a porte chiuse")
- The Case of the Bloody Iris (1972) – Sheila Heindricks
- So Sweet, So Dead (1972) – Franca Santangeli
- Sette scialli di seta gialla (1972) – Helga Schurn
- The Infamous Column (1972) – L'amante di Arconati
- L'illazione (1972, directed by Lelio Luttazzi)
- Il gatto di Brooklyn aspirante detective (1973) – Gravida De Porcaris
- The Voyage (1974, directed by Vittorio De Sica) – Simona
- Verginità (1974)
- Ciak, si muore (1974) – Lucia
- Paolo Barca, Schoolteacher and Weekend Nudist (1975)
- Le braghe del padrone (1978) – Wife of Eugenio
- Estigma (1980) – (final film role)
