= Shoot the Living and Pray for the Dead =

1971 film

- Italian theatrical poster
- Directed by: Giuseppe Vari
- Written by: Adriano Bolzoni
- Starring: Klaus Kinski; Dante Maggio
- Cinematography: Franco Villa
- Edited by: Giuseppe Vari
- Music by: Mario Migliardi
- Production company: Castor Film
- Release date: 31 August 1971
- Running time: 90 minutes
- Country: Italy
- Language: Italian

Shoot the Living and Pray for the Dead (Italian: Prega il Morto e Ammazza il Vivo) is the original release title of the 1971 Italian dramatic spaghetti Western film directed by Giuseppe Vari, and starring Klaus Kinski and Dante Maggio. With its many international releases, the film had additional English titles of Pray to Kill and Return Alive, To Kill a Jackal, and Renegade Gun. The script by Adriano Bolzoni is inspired by American noir-crime films of the 1930s and 1940s, and Kinski's entry into the scene reprises Edward G. Robinson's presence in Key Largo (1948).

== Plot ==
After having robbed a bank for $100,000 in gold bars, Dan Hogan (Klaus Kinski) and his gang meet up at the Jackal's Ranch stagecoach way station near the Mexican border, where Hogan's girlfriend Daisy (Anna Zinnemann) is to surreptitiously bring their stolen gold to them. While they await her arrival, they encounter John Webb (Paolo Casella), a stranger who had shot the man who was to be their guide and who himself wants half their gold in exchange for leading them into Mexico. Webb implies there is a traitor in the gang, causing mutual suspicion including of Daisy. The gang also imprison the travellers on a stagecoach that stops at the station. Reed, one of Hogan's men, holds the others at gunpoint and destroys the telegraph, over Hogan's objections. An attempt by Jonathan, the station owner, to intimidate Reed into standing down fails after Webb intervenes. After Daisy arrives, Hogan kills Reed and offers Webb Reed's share, but Webb insists on a full half.

Rangers arrive at the station, having realised that the telegraph is out. The gang hastily conceal themselves and their female hostages. The rangers eventually leave, unsuspecting, but one of the gang members accidentally kills one of the women while trying to rape her. Another gang member, disgusted, attacks him, and they kill each other. The coachman persuades one of his passengers to try to kill Hogan, but when he fails, Hogan shoots the coachman. In the morning, Webb leads the remaining gang members, including one of the women from the coach, and Sandy, Jonathan's granddaughter, into the desert.

Jonathan informs the rangers about their likely route and sets off in pursuit in the hope of rescuing the women. The rangers find him, and their commander tells him that Webb is in fact a man named Parker, the son of a famous judge who was killed along with his family by Hogan during the Civil War.

On the trail, the party members die one by one. One of the women, Eleanor, drowns in quicksand while Hogan watches. As mutual suspicion grows, Hogan becomes separated from the group. After Cobra goes to look for him, the other holds Webb and Sandy at gunpoint and tells Webb to escort him to the border alone. However they soon re-encounter Hogan and Cobra, and Hogan kills his man for deserting him. Before they reach the border, Webb releases Sandy, the final hostage, before reminding Hogan that he never found out who betrayed him, prompting Hogan to kill Cobra. Webb then reveals that in fact Daisy was the traitor, and that the gold is fake.

Webb finally reveals his identity to Hogan, who becomes even more determined to kill him. In a final confrontation, Webb shoots and kills Hogan. He then retrieves Sandy and meets up with the rangers and Jonathan. He offers to let Sandy take in Hogan's body for the bounty, but she decides instead to ride off with Webb.

== Cast ==
- Klaus Kinski as Dan Hogan
- Paolo Casella as John Webb
- Dante Maggio as Jonathan
- Dino Strano as Reed
- Patrizia Adiutori as Santa
- Goffredo Unger as Skelton
- Aldo Barberito as Greene
- Victoria Zinny as Eleanor
- Anna Zinnemann as Daisy
- John Ely
- Anthony Rock
- Fortunato Arena
- Adriana Giuffrè
- Gianni Pulone

== Production ==
The film was shot simultaneously with The Last Traitor (Il tredicesimo è sempre Giuda), another Spaghetti Western that was also directed and written by Vari and Bolzoni.

== Releases ==
First released theatrically as Prega il morto e ammazza il vivo in Italy on 31 August 1971, the film was distributed internationally under different titles. In West Germany it was released as Der Mörder des Klans. In its 24 May 1972 French release, it was Priez les morts, tuez les vivants. On release on cable television in Brazil it was titled Mata o Vivo E Reza Pelo Morto. When first released in the United States, it was as Pray to Kill and Return Alive, while its international release title in English was Renegade Gun. Subsequently, it was also released as To Kill a Jackal and then Shoot the Living and Pray for the Dead. It was released in Finland as Rukous kuolleiden puolesta. In its 19 September 1973 release in Sweden it was as Skjut de levande - bed för de döda, while in Portugal on 28 July 1975, it was as Reza Pelo Morto e Mata o Vivo, and its latest US release was as To Kill a Jackal.

=== DVD release ===
The German DVD release quality is considered very good, with the image being clean and sharp. The German language dubbing is well done but the English language dubbing is a bit dull. DVD extras include a picture gallery showing stills of the film, as well as stills of international poster artwork, clips of other Klaus Kinski projects, and trailers for other Koch Media films.

== Reception ==
Of its German release, Das Filmmagazin said that there was nothing wrong in principle for Klaus Kinski to be in this Spaghetti Western even though the actor and genre have been in better productions. The role of Dan Hogan was a perfect opportunity for Kinski to create a character who was an ice cold lunatic on the verge. Das Filmmagazin also felt that the reduced scope of the limited locations of the coach station and the desert allowed the director to use hand-held shots to create a surreal tonality. The wobbling close-ups of faces captured intensity of expressions, short shots with wide focal lengths, tilted camera angles, and other unusual camera work were used to generate mood. They summarised by writing "Ein spannender, nahezu minimalistischer Italowestern, der zwar nicht mit den Besten seines Fachs mithalten kann, aber in der zweiten Liga eine ziemlich gute Figur macht." (An exciting, almost minimalist Spaghetti Western, which, although it cannot compete with the best in its field, makes a pretty good figure in the second division). The Spaghetti Western Database calls the film a "thoroughly interesting mystery thriller disguised as a Western" and representative of "one of the best examples of the forgotten gems of the Spaghetti Western". On the other hand, Italian film critic Paolo Mereghetti criticized the film, calling it "an absolutely conventional western, with a Kinski to the minimum of his actorial capabilities". In his review for the website Sense of View, Carsten Henkelmann, while highlighting the lack of rhythm ("The action is for the most part very quiet, the narration is quite slow"), praised the originality of the plot ("it is a Western that uses the usual gunfights as a last resort").

In his investigation of narrative structures in Spaghetti Western films, Fridlund counts Shoot the Living and Pray for the Dead among the many stories about an infiltrator with a hidden agenda that took their inspiration from A Fistful of Dollars.

Quentin Tarantino ranked the film 16th in his personal "Top 20 favorite Spaghetti Westerns".
