= Kill Them All and Come Back Alone =

1968 film by Enzo Castellari

- U.S. poster
- Directed by: Enzo G. Castellari
- Screenplay by: Tito Carpi; Francesco Scardamaglia; Joaquín Romero Hernández; Enzo G. Castellari
- Story by: Tito Carpi; Enzo G. Castellari
- Produced by: Edmondo Amati
- Starring: Chuck Connors; Frank Wolff; Franco Citti; Leo Anchóriz; Ken Wood; Alberto Dell'Acqua; Hercules Cortez
- Cinematography: Alejandro Ulloa
- Edited by: Tatiana Casini Morigi
- Music by: Francesco De Masi
- Production companies: Fida Cinematografica; Centauro Films
- Distributed by: Fida Cinematografica (Italy); Ízaro Films (Spain); Fanfare Films (U.S.)
- Release date: 24 January 1969; (Rome)
- Running time: 100 minutes
- Countries: Italy; Spain
- Languages: Italian; English

Kill Them All and Come Back Alone (Italian: Ammazzali tutti e torna solo; Spanish: Mátalos y vuelve) is a 1968 Italian–Spanish Western film directed by Enzo G. Castellari. Chuck Connors headlines an ensemble cast that also includes Frank Wolff, Franco Citti, Leo Anchóriz, Giovanni Cianfriglia, Alberto Dell'Acqua and Hercules Cortez. No woman is seen in the entire movie.

The story centers around a gang of robbers, whose boss (Connors) is tasked by a Confederate captain (Wolff) with stealing gold from a Union fort, before wiping out all of his men to save on their share of the booty. The film has earned notice as one of the genre's most action-oriented examples. It is a spiritual successor to Vado... l'ammazzo e torno (lit. 'I Go... I Kill Him and I Come Back'), another heist-themed Western made the previous year by Castellari, writer Tito Carpi and producer Edmondo Amati.

== Synopsis ==
During the American Civil War, Clyde MacKay has recruited a group of criminals, each gifted with a specific physical ability or fighting technique. The gang is summoned to a Confederate town and hired to steal the $1 million in gold secretly stored by Union troops inside Todos Santos, an old mission they ostensibly use as a gunpowder repository. However, Confederate intelligence captain Lynch decrees that, once MacKay's men have helped him fulfill his orders, he is to "kill them all and come back alone". Lynch leads the group on their mission, where brawls, gunfights and more double crosses will soon unfold.

== Cast ==
MacKay's crew

- Chuck Connors as Clyde MacKay, the mastermind
- Franco Citti as Hoagy, the boleador
- Leo Anchóriz as Deker, the pyrotechnician
- Giovanni Cianfriglia as Blade, the knife thrower
- Alberto Dell'Acqua as Kid, the acrobat
- Hercules Cortez as Bogard, the strongman

Military personnel

- Frank Wolff as Captain Lynch
- Antonio Molino Rojo as Sergeant
- Furio Meniconi (as Men Fury) as Buddy
- Alfonso Rojas as Checkpoint Sergeant
- Ugo Adinolfi as Lieutenant McKenzie
- John Bartha as Prison Camp Captain

Sergio Citti, Vincenzo Maggio, Osiride Pevarello and Pietro Torrisi also appear in stunt roles as soldiers.

== Production ==
The film was a co-production between Edmondo Amati's Fida Cinematografica of Rome, and Felix Duran Aparicio's Centauro Films of Madrid. Chuck Connors was announced as the lead in May 1968. The star pitched the film, whose English working title was reported as Kill and Come Back, as "kind of a Civil War Dirty Dozen". Filming was announced to start on June 15 at Cinecittà studios in Italy. Due to the popularity of his show The Rifleman, which was still airing in the country, the actor reportedly drew a crowd of one thousand Italian youths upon his airport arrival. On Sundays, Connors, an ex-Major Leaguer, gave baseball lessons to local children at a Rome public park.

Filming continued over the summer with location work in the Spanish provinces of Madrid and Almería. In Madrid, the town of Colmenar Viejo, the Poblado Lega y Michelena set in nearby Dehesa de Navalvillar and the Alberche river were visited. In Almería, the gorge of Rambla Lanujar and the plains of Las Salinas provided desert backdrops. The so-called American set recently opened at Las Salinas was used as a Union outpost, while other sets were found at Rancho Leone. The Todos Santos mission was integrated atop the mountains surrounding Las Salinas thanks to matte painting from veteran Spanish effects artist Emilio Ruiz.

The film was shot using the Techniscope format. As with many Italian efforts of the era, the footage was captured without sound and voiced in post-production. Behind-the-scenes coverage was featured in a contemporary documentary dedicated to Spaghetti Westerns called Western, Italian Style, which was narrated by co-star Frank Wolff.

== Release ==
=== Pre-release ===
In the U.S., the film was given an R rating, although one of the members of the ratings' board, critic Stephen Farber, was particularly incensed by it and made an unsuccessful push to give it an X. Counting more than 125 homicides and 80 beatings, he argued that the over-the-top mayhem featured therein was more desensitizing to youths than the grounded violence seen in works such as The Wild Bunch. In the U.K., the film was subjected to undisclosed cuts and received an X rating (which at the time meant no admittance under 16). The Spanish version was also shorter by about 9 minutes.

=== Theatrical ===
In Italy, the film was released by Fida Cinematografica, who hyped it as "The biggest western of 1969". It opened on 24 January 1969 in Rome, and on 5 March in Turin. In Spain, it was distributed by Ízaro Films. It opened on 29 September 1969 in Madrid, and on 30 April 1970 in Barcelona.

In the U.K., the film was released through Rank Film Distributors, and paired with Emma Hamilton. It debuted on 13 November 1969 in London, and on 14 December 1969 in Manchester. In the U.S., the film's rights were picked up by upstart Fanfare Films, who opened it on 19 May 1970 in the Los Angeles metro, and on 5 August in the New York metro. Fanfare used it as the second feature of a drive-in double bill with their in-house production, the biker film The Losers.

== Reception ==
=== Box office ===
In both Italy and Spain, the film was a commercial success. In the former, it drew an estimated 2,100,000 admissions, a sizeable audience, albeit not as strong as that of Vado... l'ammazzo e torno. In the latter, it registered an official 1,466,924 admissions.

=== Critical ===
Kill Them All and Come Back Alive has received mostly positive reviews, and has gained plaudits over time, as the film's action focus grew more aligned with modern filmgoers' sensibilities.

==== Contemporary ====
In the U.S., trade magazine Boxoffice noted the film's "handsome" look and commanded Castellari for pacing the action "briskly enough", as well as Connors for bringing to his role "a casualness befitting of a n'er-do-well more than willing to cast his fate on the wind". Louise Boyka of the Schenectady Gazette praised the film's action, writing that heist was pulled off in "amazing fashion, with some of the most spectacular stunt scenes that I have seen in ages". She noted that Connors' "pretty heartless" character differed from his usual good guy roles, "but then this is spaghetti western, filmed in Rome, and morality is never a strong point in these epics."

In Italy, communist paper L'Unità disapproved of the film's amorality, pointing to its "sad and depressing vicissitudes", and adding that its colors and widescreen only exacerbated the characters' small-mindedness. La Stampa took the opposite stance. Calling it "a western with irony", it found that the title did not fully reflect its content, which continued the director's habit of "facetiously exploring certain situations that are usually solely presented through the prism of ferocity". It deemed the actors "all worthy of praise, especially Connors and Wolff".

==== Retrospective ====
Spanish film magazine Fotogramas was less impressed by "[a]n archetypal spaghetti western, constructed with a precision superior to most of its peers. Its amorality and extreme violence are trademarks that will not surprise anyone, and the rest flows within a predictable range." Massimo Bertarelli of Il Giornale called it "[a]lmost passable, despite the grim title, [...] and endowed with a surprising self-irony. In the first part it actually is an enjoyable film, then the pace becomes asthmatic, even though you need a calculator to keep count of the deceased."

Phil Hardy's book The Western, part of William Morrow's The Film Encyclopedia collection, called it "[a] superior variant on The Dirty Dozen", adding that "[t]he stunt work is more realistic than usual and, together with the film's fast pace, helps paper over the gaping cracks in the script." Film historian Roberto Curti wrote: "Of Castellari's first films—all of them Westerns—Ammazzali tutti e torna solo, starring Chuck Connors, definitely stands out with its unusual seaside setting and pop culture influences. It still is one of the most original and striking Spaghetti Westerns of its era." Leonard Maltin was most positive, hailing the film as a "[h]ighly entertaining, action-packed spaghetti Western with nonstop fistfights, gun battles, and explosions, plus some clever plot twists."

== Post release ==
=== Special screenings ===
The film received a screening in presence of director Enzo G. Castellari during the 2014 Almería Western Film Festival.

=== Home media ===
In Spain, the film received a VHS from distributor Bilig in 1986. It came to DVD in 2007 courtesy of vintage film specialists Suevia Films. In Italy, distributor Multivision released a VHS with a 2002 date under the Number One Video label. Multivision also issued a DVD with a 2001 date, although wholesaler Terminal Video mentions a 2006 release.

An English-language DVD was released by U.S. preservationists Wild East Productions as Volume 23 of their Spaghetti Western Collection in 2008. A Blu-ray offered by U.S. distributor Kino Lorber in 2020 features both an English-language cut and an Italian cut, with minimal differences between the two.

== Soundtrack ==
The film's original score was composed by Francesco De Masi, and combines his Italian and American influences. It was issued on LP by Italian label Beat Records in 1978, on a split album with the score for Vado... l'ammazzo e torno (Any Gun Can Play). Select tracks have appeared on several CD compilations dedicated to De Masi's works or Western films in general, before the full tracklist was re-issued by Beat Records as part of their limited edition Gold Series in 2011.

The song "Gold", a vocal version of the film's main theme performed by Ettore Raoul Lovecchio under the mononym Raoul, was selected for the Tritone d'Oro, a film song contest broadcast by Italian public broadcaster RAI, but lost to the Italian version of "The Windmills of Your Mind" from The Thomas Crown Affair.
