= Two Brothers in Trinity =

- Italian: Jesse & Lester - Due fratelli in un posto chiamato Trinità
- Directed by: Renzo Genta; Richard Harrison
- Screenplay by: Renzo Genta; Richard Harrison
- Produced by: Richard Harrison; Fernando Piazza
- Cinematography: Antonio Modica
- Music by: Carlo Savina
- Production company: H.P. International
- Distributed by: Koch Media; Video Star; Videoasia
- Release date: 27 April 1972
- Running time: 97 min
- Country: Italy

Two Brothers in Trinity or Two Brothers in a Place Called Trinity (Italian: Jesse & Lester - Due fratelli in un posto chiamato Trinità) is a 1972 Italian Spaghetti Western low comedy film directed by Renzo Genta and Richard Harrison, and produced by Fernando Piazza. It was originally called Due Fratelli (Two Brothers). It stars Gino Marturano, Luciano Rossi, and Osiride Pevarello.

In this film the half brothers pair Jesse and Lester converges to lay their hands and what keepst them together is their inherited mind, as between Hallelujah and Sartana in Alleluja & Sartana are Sons... Sons of God (1972), the hero and the monk in Tedeum (1972) and Slim and the pizza baker/preacher in Posate le pistole... reverendo (1971).

== Cast ==
- Richard Harrison as Jesse Smith, a womanising gunslinger.
- Donald O'Brien as Lester O'Hara, an honest Mormon.
- Anna Zinnemann as Elena Von Schaffer
- George Wang as Chinaman
- Gino Marturano as Poker
- Aldo Cecconi as Banker
- Fernando Cerulli as Thompson
- Luciano Rossi as Stage Robber
- Galliano Sbarra as Doctor
- Daniela Meroni as Whore
- Alba Bonfatti as Whore
- Ada Pometti as Whore
- John Bartha as Carson
- Artemio Antonini
- Fortunato Arena as Outlaw
- Gianfranco Barra
- Michele Branca
- Calogero Caruana as Townsman
- John P. Dulaney as Angry Bank Customer
- Rodolfo Licari
- Emilio Messina as Player
- Osiride Pevarello as Outlaw
- Claudio Ruffini as Miner
- Goffredo Unger as Doc
- Salvatore Baccaro as Paco
- Pasquale Basile as Cantina Owner
- Federico Boido as Blondie
- Franca Haas as Fat Woman in Saloon
- Edward Mannix as Lester
- Riccardo Petrazzi as Bandit
- Renzo Pevarello as Poker Henchman
- Ted Rusoff as Jesse
- Sergio Smacchi as Fighter in Saloon
- Robert Sommer as One-Eye
- Frank von Kuegelgen as Doc

== Bibliography ==
- Lancia, Enrico (2003). Gli Attori M-z - 8884402697. Vol. 2. Gremese Editore. p. 292. ISBN 9788884402691.
