= Vengeance (1968 film) =

1968 film by Antonio Margheriti

- Directed by: Antonio Margheriti
- Written by: Antonio Margheriti; Renato Savino
- Story by: Renato Savino
- Produced by: Alfred Leone; Renato Savino
- Starring: Richard Harrison; Claudio Camaso; Špela Rozin; Guido Lollobrigida; Werner Pochath; Paolo Gozlino; Alberto Dell'Acqua
- Cinematography: Riccardo Pallottini
- Music by: Carlo Savina
- Production companies: Super International Pictures; Top-Film; Arlington International Films
- Distributed by: Magna (Italy); Regional distributors (Germany); Cinevision Films (U.S.)
- Release date: 19 April 1968 (Italy)
- Running time: 99 minutes
- Countries: Italy; West Germany
- Language: English

Vengeance (Italian: Joko – Invoca Dio... e muori, lit. 'Joko – Invoke God... and Die', German: Fünf blutige Stricke, lit. 'Five Bloody Ropes') is a 1968 spaghetti Western film co-written and directed by Antonio Margheriti. An Italian-West German co-production funded by American interests, it starred Richard Harrison, Claudio Camaso and Špela Rozin. Harrison plays Joko Barrett, an outlaw after the five men who double-crossed him and his crew during a robbery. He finds some distraction from the demise of his psychotic accomplice Mendoza (Camaso) in the company of a traveling woman (Rosin), but keeps pieces of the five ropes they used to quarter his young recruit Richie (Alberto Dell'Acqua), only handing one back to each culprit before killing him.

The film has been noted for infusing Gothic influences into the Western, with Mario Bava biographer Leon Hunt describing it as the Western Bava might have made, had he ever attempted one. Today, it is often regarded as one of Margheriti's better efforts although most, including son Edoardo and genre historian Alex Cox, view it as a stepping stone towards his most accomplished Western, 1970's And God Said to Cain.

== Plot ==
Joko, Richie, Domingo and Mendoza hatch a plan to steal gold from bandits. Domingo, however, betrays them by revealing the attempted theft to the bandits. Joko, Ritchie and Mendoza are thus discovered during the robbery: Mendoza dies while trying to cover the escape of his friends. Ritchie escapes with the gold but is captured by five bandits and tortured in an attempt to force him to reveal where he was to meet with Joko.

When the bandits understand that Ricky won't speak, they dismember him by tying his limbs with ropes to horses. Joko thus begins his personal war to avenge his dead comrades and first kills Domingo, the traitor, and then sets off in search of the five bandits who killed Ricky: to each bandit, before killing him, Joko throws a piece of bloodied rope collected from those used to dismember Ricky. Joko, however, knows only four of the five bandits: the discovery of the identity of the last one will reserve him a bitter surprise. During the hunt for the assassins, Joko will also have to understand the role of a mysterious detective who shadows him.

== Cast ==
- Richard Harrison as Joko Barrett
- Claudio Camaso as Mendoza
- Špela Rozin as Jane (credited as Sheyla Rosin)
- Guido Lollobrigida as (credited as Lee Burton)
- Werner Pochath as Kid
- Paolo Gozlino as Lester (credited as Paul Lino)
- Alberto Dell'Acqua as Ricky / Richie (English version)
  (credited as Albert Nova)
- Ignazio Spalla as Laredo
- Mariangela Giordano as Rosita
- Goffredo Unger as Yuma
- Luciano Pigozzi as Domingo

== Production ==
The film was a co-production between Super International Pictures of Rome, and Top Film of Munich. It was backed by Arlington International Pictures, a company formed by Alfred Leone, a New York financial advisor of Italian descent, and his investor, Florida-based David B. Putnam (a member of the Putnam publishing family). The hero, use of flashbacks and some specific scenes bear the influence of the popular Sergio Leone films of the day. Co-star Claudio Camaso was also the brother of Leone actor Gian Maria Volonté. It was director Margheriti's second Western after Dynamite Joe. He collaborated on the screenplay with producer Renato Savino, who brought the story, and steered the film towards Gothic horror from the writing phase. The opening torture scene was such a nod to the genre. The film's Italian title was suggested by Harrison.

A poster announced the project in the Italian trade press in December 1967. The film was shot in Italy and Spain. Spanish locations included Rambla de Lanujar and Pechina in the Tabernas Desert of Almería. The main building of the Sierra Alhamilla Thermal Baths was repurposed to fit the story. The Tor Caldara nature reserve near Anzio, Italy, was used as well. Sets were shot at Dino de Laurentiis and Elios Studios in the Rome agglomeration. As on many of his works, Margheriti was seconded by director of photography Riccardo Pallottini. According to star Richard Harrison, the notoriously troubled Camaso was under the influence of drugs during filming. Margheriti had to move on to another film and did not oversee the editing phase, to his dissatisfaction.

== Release ==
=== Pre-release ===
Leone's relationship with Putnam soon crumbled and he ran out of money during the making of a later project, 1971's Baron Blood. American film executive Sam Lang bailed him out, but demanded that Leone give him the U.S. rights to his two prior films, Vengeance and Four Times That Night, as he needed content for the new distribution outfit he was setting up, Cinevision Films.

=== Theatrical ===
In Italy, the film was distributed by Magna. It opened on 19 April 1968, but did not debut in Rome until 9 August of that year. The film drew 1,331,000 admissions, an adequate performance by the standards of the era. In West Germany, the film was released through a network of regional distributors, including Aktuell-Film (Düsseldorf), Filmagentur Gleim (Frankfurt) and Filmagentur Süd (Munich). It debuted on 30 October 1970. The film was trimmed by a few minutes, including some dialogue.

In the U.S., the film debuted in Florida in May 1972, with the earliest screening on record occurring on the 12th. In the U.K. the film's rights were acquired by MGM-EMI Distributors, and it debuted on November 11, 1973. The U.K. theatrical cut clocked in at just 82 minutes.

=== Home media ===
The film received a German VHS in 1985 from UFA. It also received an English-language VHS in 1985 from U.K. company Guild Home Video. A widescreen VHS followed in 1993, also in the U.K., as part of distributor Aktiv's "Western Collection".

The film was released on DVD by U.S. company Image Entertainment in 2001. In Germany the film received a double DVD re-issue from the video arm of genre film magazine X-Rated in 2003. It was accompanied by a feature-length trailer marathon, as the first film in their Italowestern Series. Many home editions of the film use an art work that was actually commissioned for an earlier Harrison starrer, El Rojo. The film received a Blu-ray from U.S. label Code Red in 2017. Although that edition's box cover list a running time of 81 minutes, the full film is accounted for on the disc.

== Reception ==
=== Contemporary ===
In a contemporary review, the Monthly Film Bulletin noted that Vengeance had a "strange and colourful Gothic flavour, marred only by a hero clearly turned out on the Italian assembly line of faceless Clint Eastwood substitutes." The review also noted an "engagingly baroque villain" while "The plot, admittedly, allows Margheriti to do little but dress up proceedings and make the action as taut as possible;" The review concluded that "Margheriti's visual panache and ingenuity lift Vengeance out of the Italian Western rut and lend it a flavour more commonly associated with Bava or Freda."

Italian newspaper L'Unità found that people "drop dead like bowling pins" and that "as an Italian-style Western [...], the spectacle won't disappoint. Especially since there is a real display of technical means". However, it found that it suffered from Claudio Camaso's "fumbled character" whose "restrained histrionics needed a background and some substance". La Stampa similarly noted that the film's second half formed "one long shootout", punctuated by Camaso's "histrionic death". Segnalazioni cinematografiche, a Catholic magazine, criticized "a modest Western that follows overused and conventional patterns."

=== Retrospective ===
Time Out's Tom Charity praised "a sterling score by Carlo Savina, a juicy climax in a sulphur mine, and a remarkable opening shot" that set it apart from the more conventional approach of Fordian westerns. Sight and Sound praised "[a]n immensely enjoyable mix of Gothic horror, thriller and Western motifs," noting that "the deaths in particular are unusually imaginative."

Phil Hardy's compendium The Western appraised it as "an interesting Gothic Italian Western that survives the inept acting of its macho hero, Harrison, imitating Clint Eastwood's every gesture, by centering on atmosphere rather than action." He noted that "night scenes are particularly good, as one might expect from a director schooled in the horror genre." Veteran critic Leslie Halliwell acknowledged "a bravura and baroque, if violent, spaghetti Western, in which style triumphs over substance." John Elliot's Guide to Home Entertainment dismissed "an extremely violent but unmemorable tale".

== Soundtrack ==
Five tracks from Carlo Savina's score appeared on a split LP issued by Creazioni Artistiche Musicali (CAM) in 1968, with Gianni Ferrio's score for Find a Place to Die completing the record. An extended version was released on a limited edition CD by GDM Music in 2008.

The theme song, also called "Vengeance", was co-written and sung by Don Powell, an American expatriate to Italy who featured on several Western soundtracks of the era. According to film music journalist Jon Mansell, Nico Fidenco gets a composer credit for "Vengeance" on an early pressing, possibly in error.

== Related works ==
When Harrison was hired by Amerigo Anton for the 1971 Western The Long Ride to Vengeance, he was given a script that Anton claimed to have written, but noticed it was almost the same as that of Vengeance. Based on his objections, some rewrites were made. Some stock footage from this film was also re-used in 1971's His Name Was King, to which both Harrison and Savino participated.
