= Gianni Solaro =

Italian film and television actor (1926–2006)

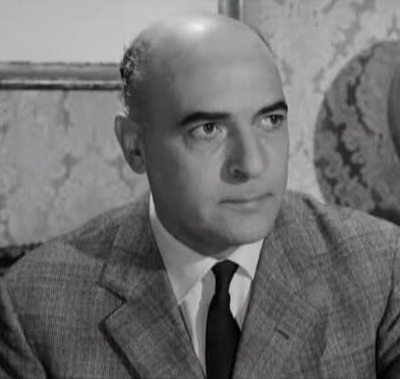
- Solaro in I criminali della metropoli (1965)
- Born: 11 August 1926; Rome, Italy
- Died: 12 August 2006 (aged 80)
- Occupation: Actor

Gianni Solaro (born Gianni Lorenzon, 11 August 1926 – 12 August 2006) was an Italian film and television actor.

== Life and career ==
Born in Rome, Solaro was a character actor in the Italian film industry for about twenty years, between the late 1950s and the late 1970s. During his career he spanned any sort of role, alternating genre films and art films, and notably working with Mario Monicelli, Marco Bellocchio, Luigi Zampa, Mario Camerini, Francesco Maselli and Florestano Vancini. He was sometimes credited John Sun. His brother was the actor Livio Lorenzon. Solaro died on 12 August 2006, one day after his 80th birthday.

== Partial filmography ==
- Tough Guys (1960)
- Erik the Conqueror (1961)
- Queen of the Seas (1961)
- The Triumph of Robin Hood (1962)
- Redhead (1962)
- Gladiator of Rome (1962)
- The Thief of Damascus (1964)
- The Two Gladiators (1964)
- Messalina vs. the Son of Hercules (1964)
- La vendetta di Spartacus (1964)
- M.M.M. 83 (1965)
- I criminali della metropoli (1965)
- Hercules the Avenger (1965)
- Captain from Toledo (1965)
- Arizona Colt (1966)
- One Thousand Dollars on the Black (1966)
- The Oldest Profession (1967)
- All on the Red (1968)
- Bootleggers (1969)
- Scipio the African (1971)
- Slap the Monster on Page One (1972)
- The Assassination of Matteotti (1973)
- We Want the Colonels (1973)
- Rome: The Other Side of Violence (1976) - Laurenti
- My Sister in Law (1976) - Magni - lawyer of Amorini
- La clinica dell'amore (1976) - Angelo Bortolotti
- Last Feelings (1978) - Hospital Doctor
