= Three Men on Fire =

- Directed by: Richard Harrison
- Screenplay by: Richard Harrison; Romano Kristoff
- Produced by: Richard Harrison; Alphonse Beni
- Starring: Richard Harrison
- Cinematography: John Knaller
- Edited by: Adriano Tagliavia
- Music by: Paolo Ormi
- Distributed by: Fank Films
- Release date: 1986
- Running time: 89 minutes
- Country: Italy
- Language: Italian

Three Men on Fire AKA Terror Force Commando is a 1986 Italian movie directed by, starring and co-written by Richard Harrison. It co-stars Romano Kristoff and Gordon Mitchell.

== Plot ==
The plot is about Inspector Baiko, a Cameroonese police officer (Alphonse Beni) who has learnt that Italian terrorists led by a man called "Zero" (Romano Kristoff) are planning to murder the Pope during his African tour in Cameroon. He then goes to Rome with a CIA agent (Richard Harrison) to investigate.

== Cast ==
- Richard Harrison as CIA agent Mathews
- Alphonse Beni as Michael Baiko
- Romano Kristoff as Zero the terrorist leader
- Gordon Mitchell as Dr. Andrew Milhench
- Ninette Assor as Olga
- Lorenzo Piani (actor) as Luca the terrorist
