= Empire of the Dark =

1991 American film by Steve Barkett

- DVD cover
- Directed by: Steve Barkett
- Screenplay by: Steve Barkett
- Produced by: Steve Barkett; Isam Jamjoom
- Starring: Steve Barkett; Richard Harrison
- Cinematography: William Stromberg; Robert Stromberg
- Edited by: Steve Barkett
- Music by: John Morgan
- Production company: The Nautilus Film Company
- Distributed by: VCI Entertainment
- Release date: 1991
- Running time: 93 minutes
- Country: United States
- Language: English

Empire of the Dark is a 1991 American fantasy action horror film written, co-produced, directed and edited by Steve Barkett, who also stars in the film. Barkett plays Richard, an ex-police officer who seeks to avenge the apparent death of his former lover (Tera Hendrickson), whom he witnessed be ritually sacrificed two decades prior by Satan worshipper Arkham (Richard Harrison) after entering a portal to Hell.

== Cast ==
- Steve Barkett as Richard Flynn
- Christopher Barkett as Terry Nash
- Tera Hendrickson as Angela Nash
- Richard Harrison as Arkham
- Dawn Wildsmith as Madame Oleska
- Jay Richardson as Eddie Green
- Patricia Schiotis as Stacey Brent
- Joseph Pilato as Guy Zupan

Animator Jim Danforth appears as one of Satan's henchmen.

== Production ==
Empire of the Dark was shot on 35 mm film.

Barkett described the film to Tulsa World:

It's really very much a Sleeping Beauty story, combined with Bela Lugosi's White Zombie and a lot of other stuff. It's the toughest movie, and the most expensive movie, I've ever made, and it's been a tough sell.

== Home media ==
The film was released on VHS by the Tulsa, Oklahoma-based distributor VCI Home Video in 1997; VCI later re-released the film on DVD and later a Blu-ray/DVD combo pack containing a 4K transfer and extras.
