= Richard Harrison (actor) =

American actor (1936–2026)

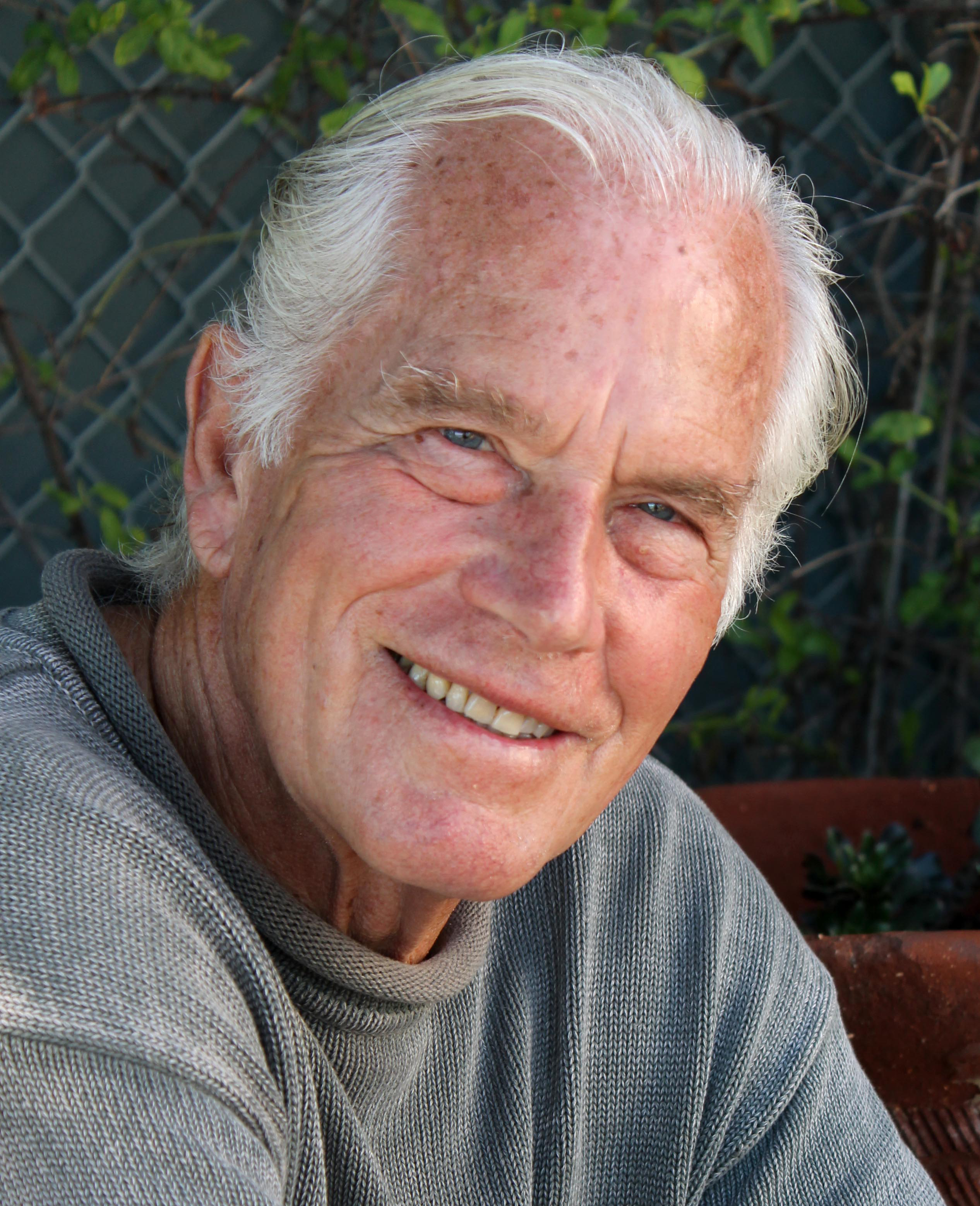
- Harrison in January 2013
- Born: May 26, 1936; Salt Lake City, Utah, U.S.
- Died: September 18, 2026 (aged 90); Los Angeles, California, U.S.
- Occupations: Actor; film director; producer
- Years active: 1957–2013
- Spouses: Loretta Nicholson (m. 1961, divorced) Francesca (m. 1978)
- Children: 4
- Relatives: James H. Nicholson (father-in-law)

Richard Harrison (May 26, 1936 – September 18, 2026) was an American actor, writer, director and producer known for his work in European B-movies during the 1960s and 1970s, and exploitation films of the early 1970s.

== Early life ==
Born in Salt Lake City, Utah, Harrison moved to Los Angeles at 17, where he was first employed at the Vic Tanny and Bert Goodrich gyms. Certain people working in the film industry trained at the gym and these encounters led Harrison to study acting.

== Career ==
=== Early American roles ===
Harrison appeared in a Santa Monica stage production, TV, and small parts in feature films. Next, Harrison worked at Twentieth Century Fox under acting coach Sandy Meisner, where he made an appearance at the beginning of South Pacific along with Tom Laughlin and Ron Ely. He eventually signed a three-film deal with American International Pictures, which led him to Italy, where he remained for almost three decades, appearing in sword and sandal films, then Eurospy films and Spaghetti Westerns. Formal acting studies differentiated Harrison from other muscular American actors working in Italy in the early 1960s, such as Brad Harris and Steve Reeves, with whom he is often grouped.

=== 1960s European movies ===
Harrison relocated to Italy in the early 1960s with his first wife Loretta, initially in a three-picture contract with producer Italo Zingarelli. He remained in Italy and became a lead in sword and sandal films, Eurospy films, and later Spaghetti Westerns. His first Italian film and first starring role were in The Invincible Gladiator (1962), directed by Alberto De Martino and Antonio Momplet. Harrison's most well-known film from his early career is the western Gunfight at Red Sands (Duello Nel Texas), directed by Ricardo Blasco in 1963. Harrison turned down Sergio Leone's A Fistful of Dollars and recommended Clint Eastwood for the role. Harrison joked that this was his greatest contribution to cinema.

He also acted in the 1968 film Joko - Invoca Dio... e muori a.k.a. Vengeance, directed by Antonio Margheriti. Luciano Martino's 1965 movie Secret Agent Fireball, Harrison's first Eurospy film, is also often cited as his best film in the genre and one of his better earlier films. He again played the role of CIA Agent Fleming in a sequel, Killers Are Challenged, in 1966.

The Italian actor Bruno Piergentili who made European features during this period was given the name "Dan Harrison," perhaps to evoke Richard's name.

=== 1970s exploitation films ===
Harrison's career declined gradually in the 1970s, coinciding with the decline of Spaghetti Westerns. He began appearing in lower-budget movies shot all over the world: In Egypt (You Can Do a Lot with 7 Women, 1971), with the Shaw Brothers in Hong Kong starring in the title role of Marco Polo (1975) and playing the German commander von Waldersee in The Boxer Rebellion (1976). Harrison worked in Turkey (The Godfather's Friend, 1972), directed by Farouk "Frank" Agrama, and as Sgt. Taylor in a Yugoslavian war film, the 1979 effort Pakleni otok, led by Vladimir Tadej.

He directed several notable films in the first half of the 1970s, including the comedic Spaghetti Western Due Fratelli, also known as Two Brothers in Trinity (1972). His co-star in Due Fratelli was the Irish American actor Donald O'Brien. Harrison and O'Brien played two estranged brothers who rejoined after receiving an inheritance, Harrison a "lovable rogue" and O'Brien a pious Mormon. Harrison wants to spend his money on building a bordello, and comic adventures in the spirit of the Terence Hill/Bud Spencer hit My Name is Trinity (1971) follow.

Other notable early 1970s films were Churchill's Leopards (1970), directed by Maurizio Pradeaux and also starring Giacomo Rossi Stuart and Klaus Kinski, in which Harrison played a double role; Acquasanta Joe (1971), directed by Mario Gariazzo and starring Ty Hardin and Lincoln Tate; and Dig Your Grave, Friend...Sabata's Coming (1971), directed by Juan Bosch, is a western livened up by the presence of Spanish actor Fernando Sancho. Harrison acted in several films with Sancho, the archetypal Mexican bandit of paella and Spaghetti Westerns, most of which were produced and/or directed by Ignacio F. Aquino.

One of the more successful Harrison films from the latter half of the 1970s was the Italian crime thriller La Belva Col Mitra (1977), a.k.a. Beast With a Gun, directed by Sergio Grieco, also starring Helmut Berger and Marisa Mell. Harrison played the part of Police Commissioner Giulio Santini, with top-billed Berger as psychotic criminal Nanni Vitali, out to kill Santini and everyone else who testified against him in court. La Belva Col Mitra had some controversy, apparently, Harrison's scenes were cut down in the film at Berger's request.

A notable curio in Harrison's 1970s filmography is the 1971 film L'Explosion, directed by Marc Simenon (the son of Georges Simenon) and co-starring Mylène Demongeot. The 1978 martial arts/spy film Challenge of the Tiger is also of curio interest, if only for the presence of Bruce Lee imitator Bruce Le (who also directed the film, with noncredit help from Paolo Solvay), European softcore star Nadiuska and Harrison's son Sebastian.

=== Z-movies in Asia ===
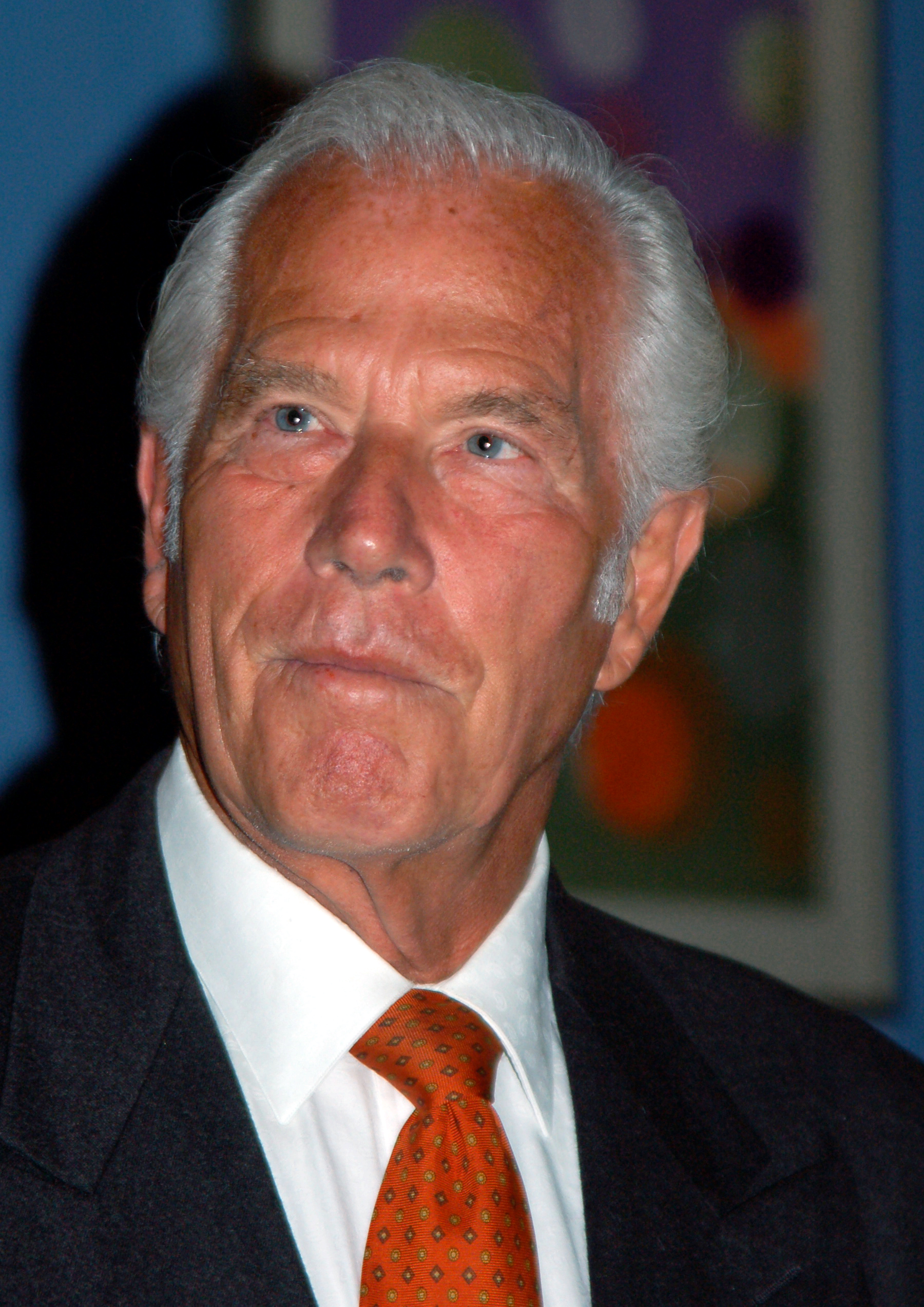
Harrison in 2011

During the 1980s, Harrison primarily appeared in B-movie action films produced in the Philippines and Hong Kong. While these films are often regarded as a low point in his career, some of his works from that era have developed a cult following.

In the Philippines, Harrison acted in five ultralow-budget actioners, best classified as Z-movies, produced by K.Y. Lim for Silver Star Film Company (called Kinavesa in the Philippines). Three, Fireback, Hunter's Crossing and Blood Debts (1985), were directed by Teddy Page, and two, Intrusion Cambodia (1984) and Rescue Team by John Gale. In the books Gods in Polyester and Gods in Spandex, Harrison states that he wrote some of the screenplays for Filipino films practically overnight, using a pseudonym. For example, Harrison's "Fireback" screenplay Harrison wrote is credited to "Timothy Jorge," a pseudonym usually used by Don Gordon Bell, one of the expatriate American actors working for Silver Star. Harrison also mentions that the Silver Star films he acted in didn't have complete shooting scripts, and many scenes were improvised on the spot, contributing to their disjointed narrative.

Silver Star reused the same group of American and European expatriate actors from film to film, all appearing in the Harrison vehicles. Mike Monty, an old acquaintance of Harrison from the Italian days who had migrated to the archipelago, James Gaines, Romano Kristoff, Bruce Baron, Ann Milhench, and others. Harrison struck a friendship with Kristoff, one of the leading Silver Star actors, and later invited him to Italy to act in a film he produced and directed, Three Men on Fire (1986).

When they were made, the poor quality of Filipino films hurt Harrison's reputation. However, they have attracted cult interest in some movie fandoms over the years. Although he fondly remembers Teddy Page, Harrison doesn't have kind words for Lim and working for the Silver Star.

In Hong Kong, Harrison starred in what was supposed to be a small number of low-budget martial arts "ninja" films directed by Chinese filmmaker Godfrey Ho, with whom he was already familiar from working for the Shaw Brothers in the 1970s. However, Ho later re-edited his scenes into many more films in a cut-and-paste style of filmmaking. As a result, Harrison found himself the unwilling star of at least twenty-four different movies, with titles like Ninja Terminator, Cobra Vs. Ninja, Golden Ninja Warrior, and Diamond Ninja Force. Like the Silver Star productions, the "ninja" films have become cult films. Disgusted with that outcome, Harrison returned to the United States.

In 1991, Harrison played Jack Roth in the drama film Lies of the Twins opposite Aidan Quinn, Isabella Rossellini, and Iman. Directed by Tim Hunter, much of the movie was shot at Harrison's beach-front home in Malibu. The film was generally well-received by critics upon release.

Harrison subsequently slowed down his film work over the next few years. His last movies were the 1993 erotic thriller Angel Eyes and the 2000 film Jerks. Angel Eyes was directed by the cinematographer/director Gary Graver and starred Erik Estrada, John Phillip Law, and Monique Gabrielle.

Some of the more noteworthy movies in Harrison's later career were the Moroccan film Amok (1982) and Dark Mission (1987), by controversial Spanish director Jesús Franco. It had a cast featuring Christopher Lee, Christopher Mitchum, and French adult film star Brigitte Lahaie (also known for appearing in the horror films of Jean Rollin).

One of the few serious roles that Harrison portrayed in the 1980s was that of American President Andrew Johnson in Ali Hatami's Iranian production Hajji Washington. The film was completed in 1982 but was not screened in Iran until 1998.

He later founded a now defunct, multisystem electronics company named Gladiator Electronics with his son Sebastian.

== Personal life and death ==
In 1961 he married Loretta Nicholson, the daughter of American International Pictures co-chief James H. Nicholson. He married his second wife, Francesca, in 1978. He had four children (Richard II, Robert, Sebastian, Summer).

It was reported in January 2025 that Harrison's Malibu home had been destroyed in the Palisades Fire. Harrison was evacuated by first responders.

Harrison died of natural causes in Los Angeles on September 18, 2026, at the age of 90.

== Partial filmography ==
- Kronos (1957), as Pilot
- Jeanne Eagels (1957), as Cpl. Hodgson (uncredited)
- South Pacific (1958), as Co-Pilot
- Too Much, Too Soon (1958), as Swimming Companion (uncredited)
- Battle Flame (1959), as 2nd Lt. Wechsler
- Tall Story (1960), as Student (uncredited)
- Master of the World (1961), as Alistair
- The Invincible Gladiator (1961), as Rezius
- Avenger of the Seven Seas a.k.a. Il giustiziere dei mari (1962), as Lieutenant David Robinson
- Gladiators 7 (1962), as Darius
- Medusa Against the Son of Hercules a.k.a. Perseo l'invincibile (1963), as Perseo
- The Saracens a.k.a. Il pirata del diavolo (1963), as Marco Trevisan
- Gunfight at Red Sands a.k.a. Duello nel Texas a.k.a. Gringo (1963), as Ricardo 'Gringo' Martinez
- Sons of Vengeance (1964), as Jeff Walker
- Messalina vs. the Son of Hercules a.k.a. L'ultimo gladiatore (1964), as Glaucus
- The Two Gladiators a.k.a. Fight or Die (1964), as Lucius Crassus
- Revolt of the Praetorians (1964), as Velerio Rufo
- Giants of Rome (1964), as Claudius Marcellus
- Adventures of the Bengal Lancers (1964), as Sgt. Frankie Ross
- Jungle Adventurer a.k.a. Temple of a Thousand Lights (1965), as Alan Foster
- Secret Agent Fireball (1965), as Bob Fleming
- 100.000 dollari per Ringo a.k.a. $100,000 for Ringo (1965), as Lee 'Ringo' Barton
- Bob Fleming... Mission Casablanca a.k.a. Killers Are Challenged (1966), as Bob Fleming
- El Rojo (1966), as Donald 'El Rojo' Sorensen
- Ring Around the World a.k.a. Duello nel mondo (1966), as Fred Lester
- Master Stroke a.k.a. Colpo maestro al servizio di Sua Maestà britannica (1967), as Arthur Lang / Owen
- 28 minuti per 3 milioni di dollari a.k.a. 28 Minutes for 3 Million Dollars (1967), as Jacques
- L'uomo del colpo perfetto a.k.a. Hot Diamonds in Cold Blood (1967), as Steve Norton
- Fantabulous Inc. (1967), as Richard Werner aka Karl Meyer
- Vengeance a.k.a. Joko - Invoca Dio... e muori (1968), as Joko / Rocco Barrett
- Day After Tomorrow a.k.a. Uno dopo l'altro (1968), as Stan Ross
- Between God, the Devil and a Winchester (1968), as Father Pat Jordan
- C'era una volta un gangster (1969), as Larry Alfieri
- 36 Hours to Hell (1969), as Captain Stern
- Pussycat, Pussycat, I Love You (1970), as Hero
- Stagecoach of the Condemned (1970), as Robert Walton
- Churchill's Leopards (1970), as Lt. Richard Benson / Lt. Hans Müller
- Reverend's Colt (1970), as Sheriff Donovan
- L'Explosion (1971), as Max
- Dig Your Grave Friend... Sabata's Coming (1971), as Steve McGowan
- His Name Was King (1971), as John 'King' Marley
- Holy Water Joe (1971), as Charlie Bennett
- Lo sceriffo di Rockspring a.k.a. Sheriff of Rock Springs (1971), as The Sheriff
- You Can Do a Lot with 7 Women a.k.a. Si può fare molto con 7 donne (1972), as Mike Spencer
- Two Brothers in Trinity (1972), as Jesse Smith
- Deadly Trackers (1972), as Jeff Carter / James Luke / Django
- Los fabulosos de Trinidad (1972), as Scott
- The Godfather's Friend a.k.a. The Way of the Godfather (1972), as Richard Maddock
- Joe Dakota (1972), as Joe Dakota
- Pugni, pirati e karatè (1973), as Gargantua / 'Garga'
- Dört Hergele (1974)
- Anasinin Gozu (1974)
- Story of a Poor Young Man (1974)
- Una donna per 7 bastardi (1974), as Cripple
- Un viaje de locos (1974)
- Yankesici (1975)
- Marco Polo a.k.a. The Four Assassins (1975), as Marco Polo
- The Boxer Rebellion a.k.a. The Bloody Avengers (1976), as General von Waldersee, the German Commander
- Achtung! The Desert Tigers (1977), as Maj. Lexman
- Natascha - Todesgrüße aus Moskau (1977), as Bukow
- La belva col mitra a.k.a. Beast with a Gun (1977), as Santini
- Clouzot & C. contro Borsalino & C. (1977), as Borsalino
- Chubby Chiro's Big Con (1978)
- Sahit (1978)
- Provincia violenta (1978), as Augusto
- Napoli... i 5 della squadra speciale (1978), as Areangeli
- Black Gold Dossier (1979), as Richard Benson
- Pakleni otok (1979), as Americki narednik Taylor
- Napoli storia d'amore e di vendetta (1979), as Frank
- Don't Trust the Mafia (1979), as Questore Ferrari
- Challenge of the Tiger a.k.a. Gymkata Killer (1980), as Richard Cannon
- Orgasmo nero a.k.a. Voodoo Baby (1980), as Paul
- La mondana nuda (1980)
- Hajji Washington (1982), as President Andrew Johnson / Grover Cleveland
- Corri come il vento, Kiko (1982), as Guido
- Rescue Team (1983)
- Hunter's Crossing (1983), as Burns Jr.
- Fireback (1983), as Jack Kaplan
- Intrusion Cambodia (1983)
- Amok (1983), as Elton Horn
- Zhi zun shen tou (1984)
- Blood Debts a.k.a. Eliminator (1985), as Mark Collins
- È arrivato mio fratello a.k.a. Here's My Brother (1985), as Spinetti
- Ninja Terminator (1985), as Ninja master Harry
- Ninja Holocaust (1985)
- Lei ting chu chuan (1985), as Richard
- Three Men on Fire (1986), as Mathews - CIA agent
- Ninja the Protector (1986), as Ninja Master Gordon Anderson
- Ninja Champion (1986), as Richard
- Ninja Thunderbolt (1986), as Richard
- The Ninja Squad (1986), as Ninja master Gordon
- Ninja Hunt (1986)
- Ninja Dragon (1986), as Ninja Master Gordon
- Golden Ninja Warrior (1986)
- Ninja Kill (1987), as Ninja master Gordon
- Ninja Operation: Licensed to Terminate (1987)
- Evil Spawn (1987), as Max Adrian
- Hitman the Cobra (1987), as Phillip
- Ninja: Silent Assassin (1987), as Ninja Master Gordon
- Operação Ninja III (1987), as Ninja Master Gordon
- Ninja Commandments (1987), as Ninja Master Gordon
- Ninja Avengers (1987), as Master Gordon
- Cobra vs. Ninja (1987), as Ninja master Gordon
- The Ninja Showdown (1988), as Ninja Master Gordon
- Ninja Powerforce (1988), as Ninja Master Gordon
- Ninja: The Bootlace Philosophy (1988)
- Diamond Ninja Force (1988), as Ninja Master Gordon
- Hands of Death (1988)
- Dark Mission (1988), as Lt. Sparks
- The Power of Ninjitsu (1988), as Gordon
- Scorpion Thunderbolt (1988)
- Ninja Strike Force (1988), as Ninja Master Gordon
- Gemini, the Twin Stars (1988), as Senator Buffington
- Above the War (1989), as General O'Connor
- Terminal Force (1989), as Nick Tyree
- Operation Las Vegas (1990), as Jefferson
- Highway to Hell (1990)
- Empire of the Dark (1991), as Arkham
- The Channeler (1991), as Jack
- Lies of the Twins (1991), as Jack Roth
- Paid to Kill (1991), as James Burton
- Angel Eyes (1993), as Vince
- Un affare trasversale (1998)
- Jerks (2000)

== Bibliography ==
Harrison contributed pieces on his 1970s and 1980s films to two compilations:

- Gods In Polyester, or, A Survivors' Account of 70's Cinema Obscura (2004)
- Gods In Spandex, or, A Survivors' Account of 80's Cinema Obscura (2007)
