= Devil's Island (1979 film) =

- Directed by: Vladimir Tadej
- Starring: Peter Carsten; Igor Galo; Richard Harrison; Beba Lončar; Klaus Löwitsch; Miodrag Krstović; Ružica Sokić; Slavko Štimac; Pavle Vuisić; Vera Zima
- Release date: 1979
- Running time: 90 minute

Devil's Island (Pakleni otok) is a Croatian film directed by Vladimir Tadej. It was released in 1979.
