= Adriana Giuffrè =

Italian actress (1939–2023)

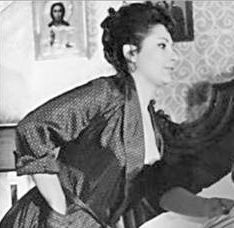
- Giuffrè in Be Sick... It's Free (1968)
- Born: 9 March 1939; Rome, Italy
- Died: 14 August 2023 (aged 84); Tarquinia, Italy
- Occupation: Actress
- Years active: 1961–2023

Adriana Giuffrè (9 March 1939 – 14 August 2023) was an Italian actress. She appeared in more than fifty films since 1961. Giuffrè died in Tarquinia on 14 August 2023, at the age of 84.

== Filmography ==
Year	Title	Role	Notes
1967	Any Gun Can Play		
1967	Vengeance Is Mine		
1968	Django, Prepare a Coffin		
1968	The Great Silence		
1968	Be Sick... It's Free		
1970	Shango		
1971	Il clan dei due Borsalini		
1971	Shoot the Living and Pray for the Dead		
1981	Chaste and Pure		
1981	Fantasma d'amore		
1981	Mia moglie torna a scuola		
1982	Sesso e volentieri		
1982	Vai avanti tu che mi vien da ridere		
1982	W la foca		
1982	I camionisti		
1983	The Atlantis Interceptors		
