= Infame accusa =

- Directed by: Giuseppe Vari
- Music by: Carlo Innocenzi
- Release date: 20 February 1953
- Country: Italy
- Language: Italian

Infame accusa is a 1953 Italian melodrama film. It represents the directorial debut by Giuseppe Vari.

== Cast ==
- Mirella Uberti as Gina
- Piero Lulli as Marco
- Folco Lulli as Giovannino
- Marisa Merlini as Lover of Giovannino
- Arnoldo Foà as Don Antonio
- Vittorio Duse
