= Day After Tomorrow (film) =

1968 Italian film directed by Nick Nostro

- Italian: Uno dopo l'altro
- Directed by: Nick Nostro
- Screenplay by: Nick Nostro; Simon O'Neill; Carlos Emilio Rodríguez; Giovanni Simonelli; Mariano de Lope
- Story by: Nick Nostro; Simon O'Neill; Carlos Emilio Rodríguez; Giovanni Simonelli; Mariano de Lope
- Starring: Richard Harrison; Pamela Tudor
- Cinematography: Mario Pacheco
- Edited by: Renato Cinquini
- Music by: Fred Bongusto; Berto Pisano; Paolo Gozlino
- Production companies: Atlantica Cinematografica Produzione Films; Euroatlantica; Midega Film
- Distributed by: Adria Filmverleih; As Films S.A.; Colosseo-Film; Interpeninsular
- Release date: 13 August 1968 (Italy)
- Running time: 99 min
- Country: Italy

Day After Tomorrow (Italian: Uno dopo l'altro) is a 1968 Italian Spaghetti Western film directed by Nick Nostro, written by Mariano De Lope, Simon O'Neill, Giovanni Simonelli and starring Richard Harrison, Pamela Tudor and José Bódalo. Music for the film was composed by Fred Bongusto and Berto Pisano.

== Cast ==
- Richard Harrison as Stan Ross
- Pamela Tudor as Sabine
- Paolo Gozlino as Glenn
- José Bódalo as Colonel Jefferson
- Jolanda Modio as Tina
- Hugo Blanco as Miguel
- José Manuel Martín as Espartero
- Fortunato Arena as Trent
- José Jaspe as Pablo
- Eugenio Galatini
- María Saavedra as Salma
- José Canalejas as Frank
- Luis Barboo as Hud
- Dario Micheli as Pedro
- Mirella Pamphili as Juanita
- Ettore Arena as Townsman
- Angelo Casadei as Townsman
- Alberigo Donadeo as Townsman
- Gilberto Galimberti as Espartero Henchman
- Emilio Messina as Herb
- Roberto Messina as Bartender
- Gaetano Scala as Bill Ross
- Goffredo Unger as Burt
