= Who Killed the Prosecutor and Why? =

1972 film

- Film poster
- Directed by: Giuseppe Vari
- Written by: Thomas Lang
- Produced by: Mario Bertolazzi
- Starring: Lou Castel; Adolfo Celi; Beba Lončar
- Cinematography: Franco Villa
- Edited by: Giuseppe Vari
- Music by: Mario Bertolazzi
- Release date: 15 April 1972
- Running time: 92 minutes
- Country: Italy
- Language: Italian

Who Killed the Prosecutor and Why? (Italian: Terza ipotesi su un caso di perfetta strategia criminale) is a 1972 Italian thriller film directed by Giuseppe Vari and starring Lou Castel. The hardcore inserts were edited for some foreign markets.

== Cast ==
- Lou Castel as Carlo
- Beba Lončar as Olga
- Adolfo Celi as Inspector Vezzi
- Massimo Serato as Uncle Fifi
- Umberto D'Orsi as Romano, Don Salvatore's lawyer
- Renato Baldini as Marshal Notarantonio
- Consalvo Dell'Arti as Superintendent Portella
- Antonio La Raina as Mauri
- Carlo Landa as Roversi
- Carla Mancini as Nightclub Employee
- Renato Malavasi
- Fortunato Arena as Don Salvatore Aniello
- Domenico Maggio as Garrù

== Plot ==
Young photographer Carlo and his model girlfriend Olga conduct a photoshoot on the beach, then make out. At a nearby road, two men take a murdered man to a car, rear-end the vehicle, and set it on fire to stage his death as an accident. Carlo and Olga see the whole thing, Carlo taking photos of the most crucial moments.

The victim is revealed to be Giuseppe Anchisi, a high-ranking prosecutor. Inspector Vezzi is under pressure to solve the case, so he tells his colleague to distract the press, who he knows will follow the case, by lying the suspect the mob. Carlo takes the photos to his boss, Ivan Smirkov a.k.a. "Uncle Fifi", the paraplegic studio director. Uncle Fifi agrees they can make big money from the evidence.

Don Salvatore Aniello, a mafia boss, is approached by Carlo with exonerating photos, but Carlo wants 20 million lire. Don Salvatore is shocked by Carlo's boldness and laughs off the offer, refusing. In the meantime, one of the killers, Garrù, is shot dead by the other killer outside a nightclub. Carlo then turns to a paper he worked with before, demanding the same payment. The editor, Mauri, is consulted, and he's extremely hesitant about the photos given the risks posed from releasing them.

When the killer calls anonymously and says he'll pay the ransom, the paper cautiously agrees to the drop and sends one of their employees, Roversi. The killer stabs Roversi to steal the photos, but they're not with him, the whole thing revealed to be a trap, from which the killer escapes. Inspector Vezzi is furious at the paper, Carlo, and Uncle Fifi for delaying the investigation, especially since the killer has now set his sights on them.

Carlo and Olga go into hiding, but the killer strangles Uncle Fifi. He then finds where the couple are hiding, but Olga's the only one there. The killer beats Olga to try and find out where Carlo is, in spite of her pleas for mercy. When Carlo hears Olga being attacked over the photo, he rushes to save her, but he's too late, and she dies in the hospital.

Carlo finally relies on Vezzi, who decides to use Carlo as bait. The killer appears to shoot Carlo during another arranged meeting, but the bullet was lodged in protective glass. When lights shine on the killer, he's revealed to be Mauri, who fails to escape and is arrested. Mauri was a drug dealer with Garrù's assistance, and he killed Anchisi to stop his rapidly accelerating investigation into the operations. Carlo recognized Mauri and decided to directly target him, but the blackmail resulted the murders and attacks that followed. Carlo is absolved of scrutiny for his cooperation.
