= The Invincible Gladiator =

- Directed by: Alberto De Martino; Antonio Momplet
- Screenplay by: Francesco De Feo; Alberto De Martino; Anacleto Fontini; Antonio Momplet; Francesco Thellung; Nativdad Zaro
- Story by: Francesco De Feo; Anacleto Fontini; Francesco Thellung; Nativdad Zaro
- Produced by: Alberto De Martino; Antonio Momplet
- Starring: Richard Harrison; Isabelle Corey; Livio Lorenzon; Leo Anchóriz
- Cinematography: Eloy Mella
- Edited by: Otello Colangeli
- Production companies: Films Columbus; Variety Film Productions; Athena Films
- Release date: 13 October 1961 (Italy)
- Running time: 105 minutes
- Countries: Italy; Spain

The Invincible Gladiator (Italian: Il gladiatore invincibile, Spanish: El gladiador invencible) is a 1961 film directed by Alberto De Martino and Antonio Momplet. The film stars Richard Harrison.

== Plot summary ==
Twelve-year-old royal king Darius, the tyrannical Rabirius, leads Acastus, a member of the Roman Empire. Gladiator Rezius saves the life of Rabirius and is tasked with leading a military expedition to destroy the band of mountain robbers. In the course of his mission, Rezius discovers that the bandits are in fact rebels led by Darius' sister Sira. Rezius's gladiator friends raise the people to rebellion, Darius ascends the throne, and Sira and Rezius get each other.

== Cast ==
- Richard Harrison as Rezio
- Isabelle Corey as Sira
- Livio Lorenzon as Ito
- Leo Anchóriz as Rabirio
- José Marco as Vibio
- Ricardo Canales as Semanzio
- Antonio Molino Rojo as Euclante
- Edoardo Nevola as Dario
- Jole Mauro as Xenia
- Giorgio Ubaldi

== Production ==
The film's exterior scenes were shot at Sevilla Film Studios in Sevilla and in La Pedriza, while the interior scenes were filmed at the De Paolis Studios in Rome.

== Release ==
The Invincible Gladiator was released in Italy on 31 October 1961. It was released in the United States in September 1963 with a 96-minute running time.
