= Between God, the Devil and a Winchester =

1968 film by Marino Girolami

- Directed by: Marino Girolami
- Screenplay by: Marino Girolami; Amedeo Sollazzo; Tito Carpi; Manuel Martinez Ramis
- Story by: Gino De Santis
- Starring: Richard Harrison; Gilbert Roland; Enio Girolami; Folco Lulli
- Cinematography: Pablo Ripoll; Alberto Fusi
- Edited by: Antonio Gimeno
- Music by: Carlo Savina
- Production companies: Circus Film; R.M. Films
- Distributed by: Fida Cinematografica
- Release date: 1968
- Countries: Italy; Spain

Between God, the Devil and a Winchester (Italian: Anche nel west c'era una volta Dio) is a 1968 Spaghetti Western film directed by Marino Girolami. The story is based on the 1883 novel Treasure Island by Robert Louis Stevenson.

== Cast ==
- Richard Harrison as Father Pat Jordan
- Gilbert Roland as Juan Chasquisdo
- Enio Girolami as Marco Serraldo
- Folco Lulli as Colonel Bob Ford
- Raf Baldassarre as Pedro Batch
- Dominique Boschero as Marta
- Roberto Camardiel as Uncle Pink

== Release ==
Between God, the Devil and a Winchester was first distributed in 1968. It was distributed by Fida Cinematografica in Italy.

== See also ==
- List of Italian films of 1968
