= Moira Orfei =

Italian actress and circus performer (1931–2015)

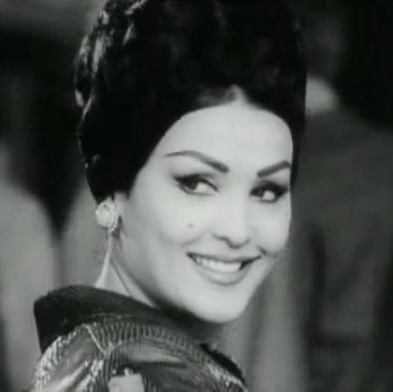
- Orfei in the movie Signore & signori (1966)
- Born: Miranda Orfei; 21 December 1931; Codroipo, Udine, Kingdom of Italy
- Died: 15 November 2015 (aged 83); Brescia, Italy
- Other name: Moira degli elefanti ("Moira of the Elephants")
- Occupations: Circus performer; actress; television personality
- Spouse: Walter Nones (m. 1961)
- Children: 2
- Website: www.moiraorfei.it

Moira Orfei (Italian pronunciation: [ˈmɔira orˈfɛi]; born Miranda Orfei; 21 December 1931 – 15 November 2015) was an Italian circus performer, actress and television personality of remote Romani origins. Moira was also considered the queen of the Italian circus, one stage name being "Moira of the Elephants". Cult movie fans know her for the many sword-and-sandal (peplum) films she starred in.

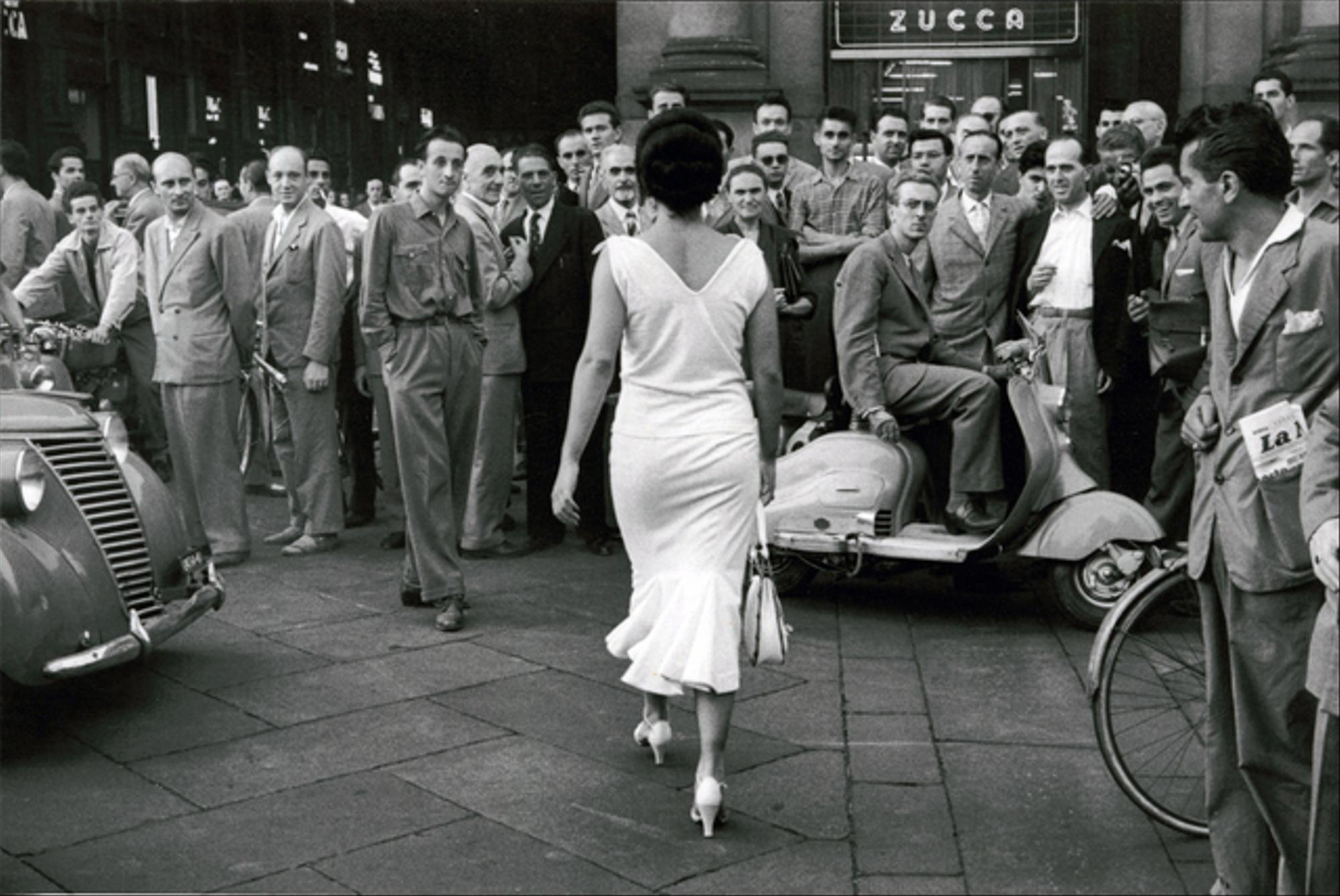
Young actress and circus performer Moira Orfei walks towards the Galleria Vittorio Emanuele II in Milan, while a large group of men turn to look at her. 1954.

== Biography ==
Raised in a family who owned the circus company Circus Orfei, Moira became the symbol of circus in Italy and attained international fame. The Circus Moira Orfei itself was founded in 1960. She was photographed in various scenes as a rider, trapeze artist, acrobat, dominatrice of elephants and trainer of doves.

Her excessively garish image mirrors her eccentric and exuberant personality. It was Dino De Laurentiis who suggested that she change her name from Miranda to Moira. From then on, her face became an effigy of unchanging characteristics: heavy make-up with eyes coated with eyeliner, bright lipstick, an accentuated mole above the lip, hair tied in a turban. Promotional billboards were carpeted with this picture in every city that the circus stopped. She also became a film actress, acting in over forty films, from comedies to sword-and-sandal films (among which were many Italian crime films).

== Personal life ==
Her parents were Riccardo Orfei, who was the clown Bigolon, and Violetta Arata. She married Walter Nones in 1961, and they had two children Stefano Orfei and Lara Orfei.

== Death ==
On 4 August 2006, Moira Orfei suffered an ischemic stroke during a show in Gioiosa Ionica. The artist was still under medical care when she died nine years later from natural causes on 15 November 2015 in Brescia, Italy.

== Filmography ==
Year	Title	Role	Notes
1960	The Loves of Hercules	Nemea	
1960	Under Ten Flags	Shipwrecked	Cameo appearance
1960	Ti aspetterò all'inferno	Anouk	
1960	Queen of the Pirates	Jana	
1960	The Giants of Thessaly	Atalanta	Cameo appearance
1961	Ursus	Attea	
1961	Revenge of the Conquered	Edma	
1961	Mole Men Against the Son of Hercules	Halis Mosab	
1961	Rocco e le sorelle	Lola	
1961	Armi contro la legge	Norma	
1961	Atlas in the Land of the Cyclops	Paesant girl	Cameo appearance
1961	Che femmina e… che dollari!	Moira	
1962	Kerim, Son of the Sheik	Zaira	
1962	Il re Manfredi	Grenda	
1962	I tromboni di Fra' Diavolo	Carmela	
1962	Ursus in the Valley of the Lions	Diar	
1962	Gli italiani e le donne	Claudia Caracci	Segment: "L'abito non fa il monaco"
1963	I due mafiosi	Claudette	
1963	Toto vs. the Four	Mrs. Fiore	Scenes cut
1963	Toto and Cleopatra	Octavia the Younger	
1963	Samson and the Slave Queen	Malva	
1963	Divorzio alla siciliana	Marisa	
1963	The Monk of Monza	Sister Virginia	
1963	The Beast of Babylon Against the Son of Hercules	Ura	
1964	The Two Gladiators	Marzia	
1964	I predoni della steppa	Malina	
1964	Revolt of the Praetorians	Artamne	
1964	Samson and His Mighty Challenge	Dalila	
1964	The Triumph of Hercules	Pasiphae	
1965	Casanova 70	Santina	
1965	How We Got into Trouble with the Army	Taide Bonafini	
1965	L'incendio di Roma	Poppaeia	
1965	Two Sergeants of General Custer	Baby O'Connor	
1966	Due mafiosi contro Al Capone	Rosalía	
1966	The Birds, the Bees and the Italians	Giorgia Casellato	
1968	Torture Me But Kill Me with Kisses	Adelaide	
1974	Paolo il freddo	Herself	Cameo appearance
1974	Scent of a Woman	Mirka	
1975	Dracula in the Provinces	Bestia Assatanata	
1980	Arrivano i bersaglieri	Herself	Cameo appearance
1982	Pin il monello	Herself	Cameo appearance
1990	Vacanze di Natale '90	Gloria	
2003	Natale in India	Herself	Cameo appearance
2006	Moira Orfei: Amore e fiori	Herself	Documentary

== See also ==
- Anastasini Circus
