= Return of Shanghai Joe =

1974 film

- Directed by: Bitto Albertini
- Screenplay by: Bitto Albertini
- Produced by: Gerd Scheede; Ennio Onorati
- Starring: Cheen Lie; Klaus Kinski; Karin Field; Tommy Polgar
- Cinematography: Pier Luigi Santi
- Music by: Mauro Chiari
- Production companies: C.B.A. Produttori e Distributori Associati S.r.l.; KG Divina-Film GmbH & Co.
- Release dates: 28 February 1975 (Italy); 27 May 1977 (West Germany)
- Running time: 90 minutes
- Countries: Italy; West Germany

Return of Shanghai Joe (Italian: Il ritorno di Shanghai Joe) is a 1975 Western film directed by Bitto Albertini and starring Klaus Kinski.

== Plot ==
The medicine show man Bill Cannon gives refuge to the bandit Pedro Gomez, who is wounded by the men of Barnes. Before dying, Gomez suggests that Cannon should bring in his body to collect bounty. Bill is subsequently robbed by Barnes' men, but they are stopped with kung fu fighting by the Chinese Shanghai Joe. Cannon steals his horse, but Joe follows and convinces him that they should be friends.

In town Joe helps Cannon at gambling and force a bartender to eat crooked dice. Cannon helps Joe at an ambush by Barnes' men, and later helps him escape when he is to be lynched on a trumped up charge. They get support from the judge. The two men attack Barnes' ranch and the latter is killed by Cannon in a fight on top of a cliff.

When it is disclosed that Joe is a federal agent Cannon at first leaves in disgust, but then he comes back and they leave together.

== Cast ==
- Klaus Kinski - Pat Barnes
- Cheen Lie - Shanghai Joe
- Tommy Polgár - Bill Cannon
- Karin Field - Carol Finney
- Fortunato Arena - Sheriff Wilson
- Paolo Casella
- Roberto Dell'Acqua
- Consalvo Dell'Arti
- Attilio Dottesio - Village Elder
- Tom Felleghy - Judge Finney
- Claudio Giorgi - Manuel
- Renato Malavasi
- Riccardo Petrazzi
- Renzo Pevarello
- Claudio Ruffini
- Pietro Torrisi

== Release ==
Return of Shanghai Joe was released in Italy on 28 February 1975. It was released in Germany on 27 May 1977.

== Reception ==
From retrospective reviews, Thomas Weisser, author of a book reviewing Spaghetti Westerns, stated that Klaus Kinski gave a "surprisingly dignified performance" but that the film was predominantly filmed for laughs and lost the tone of the original film and was "almost as wretched as Kung Fu Brothers in the Wild West".
