= The Last Traitor =

1971 film

- Directed by: Giuseppe Vari
- Written by: Adriano Bolzoni
- Cinematography: Angelo Lotti
- Edited by: Giuseppe Vari
- Music by: Carlo Savina
- Release date: 1971
- Country: Italy
- Language: Italian

The Last Traitor (Italian: Il tredicesimo è sempre Giuda, also known as Thirteenth Is a Judas) is a 1971 Italian Spaghetti Western film directed by Giuseppe Vari.

== Plot ==
A wedding is set to take place in Sonora, Mexico sometime after the American Civil War. Former Confederate Captain Ned Carter is to marry Mary Belle. Ned's former comrades make up his wedding guests and they feast awaiting the arrival of Marry Belle on a mail stagecoach from El Paso.

The stagecoach arrives, but everyone aboard has been murdered. For what, and by whom? Something doesn't add up, and the mystery only deepens as wedding guests begin to die under suspicious circumstances.

== Cast ==
- Donald O'Brien: Captain Ned Carter
- Maurice Poli: Tim
- Dino Strano: Joe (credited as Dean Stratford)
- Maily Doria: Mary Belle Owens
- Fortunato Arena: Richter Stump
- Giuseppe Castellano: Slim
- Adriana Giuffré: Emilia
- Attilio Dottesio: General
- Franco Pesce: Fotograf
