= Giuseppe Vari =

Italian film director, editor and screenwriter

- Born: 9 March 1924; Segni
- Died: 1 October 1993 (aged 69); Rome
- Occupation: film director

Giuseppe Vari (9 March 1924 – 1 October 1993) was an Italian film director, editor and screenwriter.

== Life and career ==
Born in Segni, Rome, Vari started his career as an editor of films and documentaries, collaborating among others with Federico Fellini, Damiano Damiani and Giorgio Simonelli. In 1953 he made his directorial debut with Infame accusa, then specialized in melodramatic films. From the early sixties he focused on genre films, especially Spaghetti Westerns, sometimes being credited as Joseph Warren.

== Filmography ==
=== Director ===
- Infame accusa, (also screenwriter, 1953)
- Due lacrime, (1954)
- Mamma, perdonami!, (1954)
- Vendicata!, (1955)
- Addio sogni di gloria, (also screenwriter, 1955)
- Il ricatto di un padre, (also screenwriter, 1957)
- Giovane canaglia, (also screenwriter, 1958)
- Spavaldi e innamorati, (1959)
- Revenge of the Barbarians, (1960)
- Attack of the Normans, (1962)
- Canzoni in... bikini, (1963)
- Rome Against Rome, (1964)
- Degueyo, (also screenwriter, 1966) - under the name of Joseph Warren
- Poker with Pistols, (1967) - under the name of Joseph Warren
- Death Rides Along, (1967) - under the name of Joseph Warren
- The Last Killer, (also editor, 1967) - under the name of Joseph Warren
- A Hole in the Forehead, (also editor, 1968) - under the name of Joseph Warren
- Un posto all'inferno, (also editor, 1969) - under the name of Joseph Warren
- Shoot the Living and Pray for the Dead, (also editor, 1971) - under the name of Joseph Warren
- The Last Traitor, (also screenwriter, 1971) - under the name of Joseph Warren
- Who Killed the Prosecutor and Why?, (1972) - under the name of Joseph Warren
- The Ribald Decameron, (1972) - under the name of Walter Pisani
- Lady Dynamite (1973) - under the name of Al Pisani
- Metti... che ti rompo il muso, (1973)
- Legend of the Sea Wolf, (1975) - under the name of Joseph Green
- Sister Emanuelle, (also editor, 1977) - under the name of Joseph Warren
- Return of the 38 Gang, (also screenwriter and editor, 1977)
- Urban Warriors, (1987) - under the name of Joseph Warren

=== Screenwriter ===
- The Attic, directed by Gianni Puccini (1962)

=== Film Editor ===
- Il vento mi ha cantato una canzone, directed by Camillo Mastrocinque (1947)
- Accidenti alla guerra!..., directed by Giorgio Simonelli (1948)
- Love and Poison, directed by Giorgio Simonelli (1949)
- The Transporter, directed by Giorgio Simonelli (1950)
- The Seven Dwarfs to the Rescue, directed by Paolo W. Tamburella (1951)
- La peccatrice dell'isola, directed by Sergio Corbucci (1952)
- Il Bidone, directed by Federico Fellini (1955)
- The Reunion, directed by Damiano Damiani (1963)
- Quella dannata pattuglia, directed by Roberto Bianchi Montero (1969)
