= Revolt of the Praetorians =

La Rivolta dei Pretoriani (Revolt of the Praetorians)
- Film poster
- Directed by: Alfonso Brescia
- Written by: Gian Paolo Callegari
- Produced by: Carlo Vassalle
- Starring: Richard Harrison; Piero Lulli; Paola Pitti; Giuliano Gemma
- Cinematography: Antonio L. Ballesteros
- Edited by: Eraldo Da Roma
- Music by: Carlo Franci
- Distributed by: Variety Distribution
- Release date: 1964
- Running time: Italy, France: 100 min. USA, Germany: 95 min.
- Country: Italy
- Language: Italian

La Rivolta dei Pretoriani (AKA: Revolt of the Praetorians) is a 1964 sword and sandal film about the conspiracy to assassinate the emperor Domitian in the year AD 96, though the historical facts have been heavily fictionized. This film was written by Gian Paolo Callegari, directed by Alfonso Brescia in his directorial debut and starred Richard Harrison, Moira Orfei, Giuliano Gemma and Piero Lulli as Emperor Domitian.

== Plot ==
In Ancient Rome, at about 96 AD, Emperor Domitian has become a highly paranoid and tyrannical despot who keeps the people oppressed in constant fear of a revolt. He has only a few retainers left whom he perceives as loyal: his lover Artamne, a scheming Egyptian priestess of Isis; his diminutive jester, Elpidion; his gladiator bodyguards under the command of Soterus; his palace guards; and his Imperial Praetorian Guard under the command of their centurion, Valerius Rufus. Anyone who dares speak up against the Emperor - and may it be only a minor complaint - or is suspected of treason is either imprisoned or summarily executed.

Although Valerius appears loyal, he secretly harbors resentment against the tyrant, but is careful not to reveal it. He begins fighting Domitian's rule in a masked identity; when he begins to use a red wolf's coat to hide his face, he becomes known as the "Red Wolf". Among his allies are the young senator Nerva and the old patrician Fabius Lucillius and his family, especially Fabius' daughter Lucilla, Valerius' love interest.

One day, Artamne persuades Domitian to hold a sacrificial celebration in the Imperial palace, forcing Lucilla and other patrician daughters to attend and to be subjected to exploitation by the Emperor's lust. Valerius manages to prevent this, but as he hides his mask in a secret cache in the palace garden, he is spotted by Elpidion. The next day, Valerius arranges for Lucilla, the other girls and the fugitives he has rescued to flee to Lucillius' country estate. When he returns to his quarters, he discovers Elpidion, clad in his wolfpelt mask, waiting for him, but the dwarf declares that he, too, hates Domitian and wants to join his cause. He tells of Domitian and Artamne's plan to arrest and execute all patricians suspected of treason, and Valerius, as the Red Wolf, arrives just in time to help his friends escape to Lucillius' estate.

The fugitives decide to organize an armed resistance movement, and Valerius kidnaps Artamne as a hostage. But in time, Artamne charms one of her guards into releasing her; she returns to Domitian and reveals the location of the rebels' hideout. Domitian sends out Soterus and his gladiators to eliminate the rebels. Valerius, alerted by Elpidion, fights them, allowing his friends to escape, but is wounded in the arm and Lucilla is captured. While Valerius temporarily hides his secret by putting his mask onto one of his killed friends, Soterus notices the injury and exposes him. Valerius escapes, but as he later tries to free Lucilla, he is captured himself and both are sentenced to death. In the dungeons, however, Valerius is approached by his loyal friend and subordinate in the guard, Sejanus, who reveals that the Praetorian Guards are also resentful of Domitian's tyranny and wish to overthrow him.

Valerius sends Sejanus to contact his fugitive friends, and together with a group of disgruntled travelling artists the rebels prepare to overthrow Domitian when Valerius and Lucilla are to be executed in the palace garden the following night. With Elpidion's aid, the rebel's main group enters the palace through the dungeons and takes the Emperor and his retinue by surprise. Artamne and Soterus are killed, and with the appearance of the Praetorian Guardsmen, the battle is quickly ended. Domitian makes it as far as his throne room with Lucilla as his hostage, but Valerius follows him and kills him in the ensuing duel, ending his tyranny.

== Cast ==
- Richard Harrison as Valerius Rufus
- Moira Orfei as Artamne
- Piero Lulli as Domitian
- Giuliano Gemma as Nerva
- Paola Pitti as Lucilla
- Ivy Holzer as Zusa
- Fedele Gentile as Fabius Lucilius
- Amedeo Trilli as Il guardiano della cava ("the Cave Guard")
- Mirko Ellis as Sejanus
- Renato Montalbano as Soterus
- Salvatore Furnari as Elpidion
- Massimo Carocci
- Aldo Cecconi as Soterus

== See also ==
- List of historical drama films
