= Messalina vs. the Son of Hercules =

- Directed by: Umberto Lenzi
- Screenplay by: Gian Paolo Callegari; Alberto Valentin
- Story by: Gian Paolo Callegari; Alberto Valentin
- Produced by: Alfonso Sansone
- Starring: Richard Harrison; Lisa Gastoni; Marilu Tolo; Philippe Hersent
- Cinematography: Pier Ludovico Pavoni
- Edited by: Nella Nannuzzi
- Music by: Carlo Franci
- Production companies: Promoteo Film S.R.L.; Sancro Film; Unicite; Les Films Jacques Leitienne
- Distributed by: Variety Distribution
- Release date: 27 June 1964
- Running time: 98 minutes
- Countries: Italy; France

Messalina vs. the Son of Hercules (Italian: L'ultimo gladiatore, lit. 'The Last Gladiator') is a 1964 peplum film directed by Umberto Lenzi and starring Richard Harrison and Lisa Gastoni.

== Cast ==
- Richard Harrison as Glaucus
- Lisa Gastoni as Messalina
- Marilù Tolo as Ena
- Philippe Hersent as Claudius
- Jean Claudio as Silius
- Gianni Solaro as Cassius Chaerea
- John McDouglas as Lucilius
- Charles Borromel as Caligula
- Maria Laura Rocca as Procusa
- Lydia Alfonsi
- Livio Lorenzon as Prefect of the court
- Enzo Fiermonte

== Release ==
Messalina vs. the Son of Hercules was released on June 27, 1964. In Italy, it had a runtime of 98 minutes and was titled L'ultimo gladiatore.
