= Secret Agent Fireball =

- AIP film poster
- Directed by: Luciano Martino
- Screenplay by: Ernesto Gastaldi
- Produced by: Mino Loy; Luciano Martino
- Starring: Richard Harrison
- Cinematography: Riccardo Pallottini
- Edited by: Roberto Cinquini
- Music by: Carlo Savina
- Distributed by: American International Pictures
- Release date: April 1965 (Italy)
- Running time: 89 minutes
- Country: Italy
- Language: Italian

Le spie uccidono a Beirut (literally, The Spies kill in Beirut, also titled Da 077 : le spie uccidono a Beirut, i.e. Message from 077 : the spies kill in Beirut) is a 1965 Italian/French international co-production spy film pertaining to the Eurospy genre.

In this film inspired by the James Bond film series, Richard Harrison stars as Secret Agent Fleming known as Bart Fleming Agent X-117 in some prints and as Bob Fleming Agent 077 in others. The film was directed by film producer Luciano Martino, in one of his few forays into directing. It was released in the United States by American International Pictures as Secret Agent Fireball (to exploit the then current 007 film, Thunderball) and double billed with Spy in Your Eye. The film was shot in Paris, Hamburg and Beirut.

Harrison repeated his Agent Fleming role in A 077, sfida ai killers/Killers are Challenged/Mission Casablanca.

== Plot ==
When a series of scientists are killed, Bart Fleming Secret Agent X-177 travels to Hamburg and Beirut to discover that Soviet Agents are killing the scientists. Both sides want the information the scientists took with them when they escaped from the USSR; a roll of microfilm containing information about the Soviet H-Bomb. The only link left to the film is a daughter of one of the scientists.

== Cast ==
- Richard Harrison ... Agent Fleming
- Dominique Boschero ... Liz
- Luciano Pigozzi ... Yuri (as Alan Collins)
- Aldo Cecconi ... Ivan (as Jim Clay)
- Wandisa Guida ... Elena
- Alcide Borik ... Lepetit the Taxi Driver
- Danny Taborra ... Adolf Grune
- Goffredo Unger ... Baalbek the Tribal Leader
- Carla Calò ... Jane Cartland
- Jean Ozenne ... Fleming's Boss
- Audry Fisher ... Heidi
