= Carlo Savina =

Italian composer

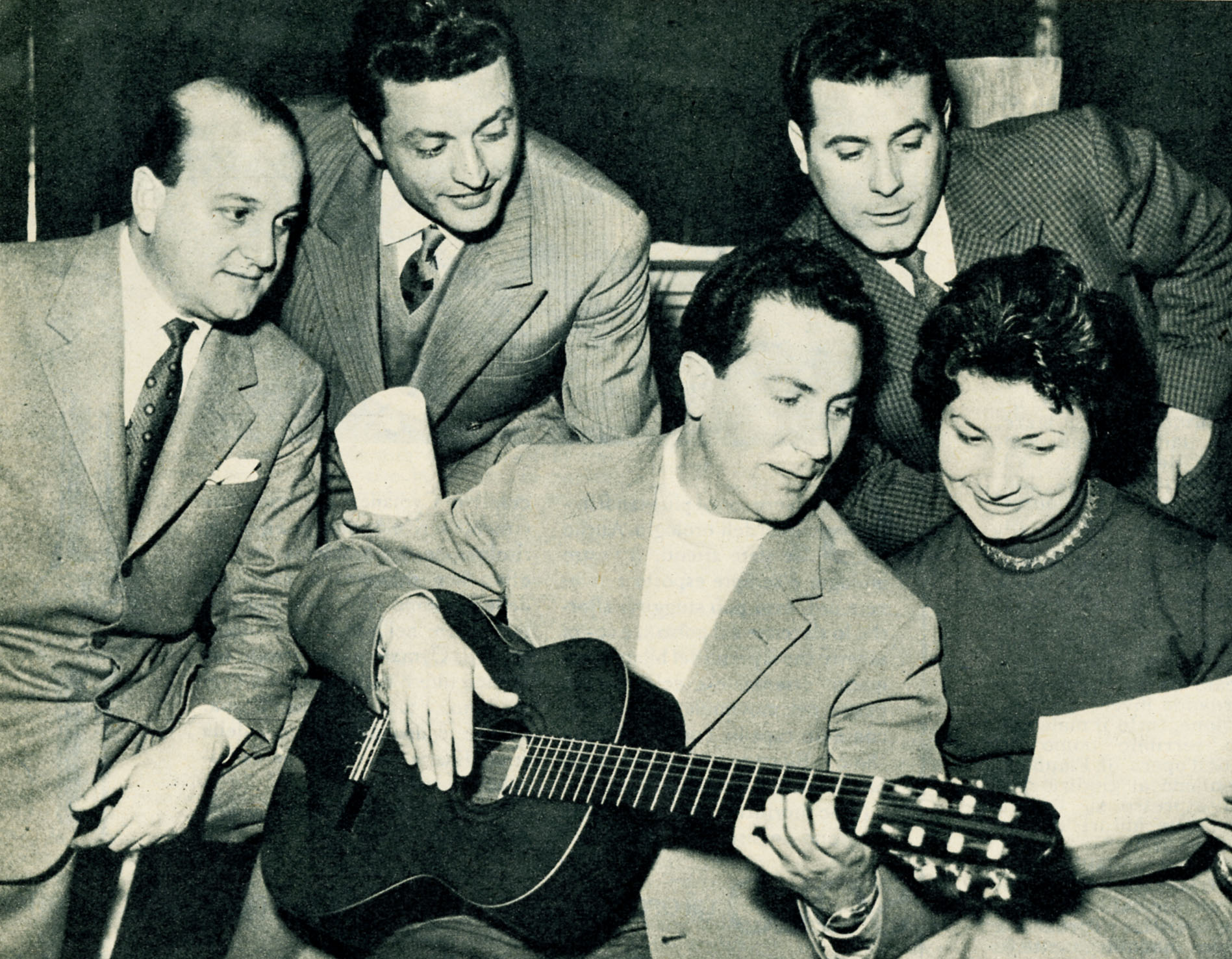
- Carlo Savina playing guitar (1954)
- Born: 2 August 1919; Turin, Piedmont, Kingdom of Italy
- Died: 23 June 2002 (aged 82); Rome, Italy
- Other names: Herbert Buckman, Charles Hanger, James Munshin
- Occupation: Composer
- Known for: Amarcord, The Godfather, The Bear

Carlo Savina (2 August 1919 – 23 June 2002) was an Italian composer and conductor who composed, arranged, and conducted music for films, and is especially remembered for being the music director of films such as The Godfather (1972), Amarcord (1973), and The Bear (1988).

Savina worked with many of the notable film score composers of the 20th century including: Ennio Morricone, Armando Trovajoli, Nino Rota, Mario Nascimbene, Stanley Myers, Stephen Sondheim, Philippe Sarde, and Miklos Rozsa. His work ranged from composing music for frequent Spaghetti Westerns such as Johnny Oro to being the musical director and conductor in Federico Fellini's Orchestra Rehearsal.

In 1985 he won the David di Donatello Best Music award for the film score of Pizza Connection.

== Biography ==
Carlo Savina came from a musical family—his father was the first clarinettist for the orchestra of an Italian public radio broadcaster EIAR. Carlo learned the violin as a child and went on to graduate from the Conservatory of Music Giuseppe Verdi in Turin where he studied piano, violin, composition, and conducting.

In 1945 he began composing music for radio. Early in his career, he was awarded a prize by the Accademia Musicale Chigiana. He started his own orchestra and soon was famous.

In 1950 he began composing and arranging music for film. For the next thirty years, he composed, arranged, and conducted music for over 200 films and became one of the most prolific, and perhaps underrated, screen and television composers of the 20th century.

== Selected filmography ==
- 1954 Toto Seeks Peace
- 1955 Girls of Today
- 1958 Herod the Great
- 1959 Head of a Tyrant
- 1959 The Moralist
- 1960 It Started in Naples
- 1960 Ferragosto in bikini
- 1961 Girl Under the Sheet
- 1961 A Difficult Life
- 1962 War Gods of Babylon
- 1962 The Fury of Achilles
- 1962 Samson Against the Sheik
- 1962 Eva
- 1962 The Rebel Gladiators
- 1962 Three Fables of Love
- 1963 Slave Queen of Babylon
- 1963 The Motorized
- 1963 Hercules Against the Mongols
- 1964 Hercules Against the Barbarians
- 1964 Spartacus and the Ten Gladiators
- 1964 Terror in the Crypt
- 1965 Gli amanti latini
- 1965 Secret Agent Fireball
- 1965 Bullet in the Flesh
- 1965 Här kommer bärsärkarna
- 1965 Veneri al sole
- 1966 Mutiny at Fort Sharpe
- 1966 The Man Who Laughs
- 1966 Bob Fleming... Mission Casablanca
- 1966 Fury in Marrakech
- 1966 Goldsnake
- 1966 Johnny Oro
- 1966 Few Dollars for Django
- 1967 Massacre in the Black Forest
- 1967 In Ghentar you die easy
- 1967 A Pact with the Devil
- 1968 The Young, the Evil and the Savage
- 1968 Death Knows No Time
- 1968 A Long Ride from Hell
- 1968 Franco, Ciccio And The Cheerful Widows
- 1968 Vengeance
- 1968 Between God, the Devil and a Winchester
- 1969 The Unnaturals
- 1969 Heads or Tails
- 1969 Malenka
- 1970 And God Said to Cain
- 1970 A Suitcase for a Corpse
- 1970 Mr. Superinvisible
- 1970 Hey Amigo! A Toast to Your Death
- 1971 The Great Swindle (1971 film)
- 1971 The Last Traitor
- 1971 School of Erotic Enjoyment
- 1971 Nights and Loves of Don Juan
- 1971 The Feast of Satan
- 1971 Eye of the Spider
- 1971 Stress
- 1972 Thunder Over El Paso
- 1972 Jesse & Lester, Two Brothers in a Place Called Trinity
- 1972 Naked Girl Killed in the Park
- 1972 An Animal Called Man
- 1972 Poppea: A Prostitute in Service of the Emperor
- 1973 Ingrid on the Road
- 1973 Love and Anarchy
- 1973 Mr. Hercules Against Karate
- 1973 The Legend of Blood Castle
- 1973 Macadam Jungle
- 1973 House of 1000 Pleasures
- 1974 I figli di nessuno
- 1974 La profanazione
- 1974 The Killer Reserved Nine Seats
- 1974 Manone il ladrone
- 1974 Orders Signed in White
- 1974 Lisa and the Devil
- 1974 Carnal Revenge
- 1975 The Stranger and the Gunfighter
- 1975 L'ingenua
- 1975 Heat in the Suburbs
- 1975 A Diary of a Murderess
- 1975 Reflections in Black
- 1975 Savage Man Savage Beast
- 1975 Bolognese
- 1976 A Riding Bull
- 1977 Nine Guests for a Crime
- 1977 Friendly Monsters from the Deep
- 1977 Grand Tour (Library Music)
- 1978 Suggestionata
- 1978 Fury
- 1978 The Perfect Crime
- 1978 Obscene Desire
- 1979 The Count of Monte-Cristo (mini-série)
- 1981 Comin' at Ya!
- 1982 Hunters of the Golden Cobra
- 1985 Pizza Connection
