= Vengeance Is My Forgiveness =

1968 film

- Directed by: Roberto Mauri
- Written by: Tito Carpi; Francesco Degli Espinosa; Roberto Natale; Luciana Ribet
- Story by: Roberto Mauri
- Starring: Tab Hunter
- Cinematography: Franco Delli Colli; Mario Mancini
- Music by: Franco Bizzi
- Distributed by: Variety Distribution
- Release date: 1968
- Language: Italian

Vengeance Is My Forgiveness (Italian: La vendetta è il mio perdono, also known as Shotgun) is a 1968 Italian Spaghetti Western film written and directed by Roberto Mauri.

== Cast ==
- Tab Hunter as Sheriff Durango
- Erika Blanc as Jane
- Piero Lulli as John Kindar
- Mimmo Palmara as Jack Quartz
- Daniele Vargas as Dr. Frank Decker
- Renato Romano as Fred Madigan
- Ugo Sasso as McLaine
- Alfredo Rizzo as Pete, the Pianist
- Dada Gallotti as Lucy McLaine
- Osiride Pevarello as Juan
- Solvejg D'Assunta as Durango's Mother
