= His Name Was King =

1971 film

- Film poster
- Directed by: Giancarlo Romitelli
- Written by: Renato Savino
- Starring: Richard Harrison; Klaus Kinski
- Cinematography: Guglielmo Mancori
- Music by: Luis Bacalov
- Release date: 18 May 1971
- Running time: 90 minutes
- Country: Italy
- Language: Italian

His Name Was King (Italian: Lo chiamavano King) is a 1971 Italian Western film directed by Giancarlo Romitelli and starring Richard Harrison and Klaus Kinski.

== Plot ==
The bounty killer "King" Marley kills one of the Benson brothers, who are wanted smugglers. In retaliation the Bensons kill King's brother and rape his sister-in-law. While King goes after the gang the widow is taken in by King's friend sheriff Foster. She is raped again by his deputy who is then killed by Foster.

The government agent Collins has King arrested, but this turns out to be a ruse to catch the real boss of the smuggling activities, which in fact is Foster. Collins also assists King in the final reckoning with the sheriff.

== Cast ==
- Richard Harrison as John 'King' Marley
- Klaus Kinski as Brian Foster
- Anne Puskin
- Tom Felleghy
- Lorenzo Fineschi
- Vassili Karis
- John Bartha
- Federico Boido (as Rick Boyd)
- Giorgio Dolfin
- Paolo Magalotti
- Osiride Pevarello
- Luciano Pigozzi as Mr. Collins
- Ada Pometti

== Reception ==
In his investigation of narrative structures in Spaghetti Western films, Fridlund writes that His Name Was King is an example of vengeance stories with an "external second motive", where there besides the avenger is a second protagonist with a different motive. This is a variant of the partnership plot that was used in many Spaghetti Westerns following the success of For a Few Dollars More where one of the bounty killer partners turns out to have a secret vengeance motive. In His Name Was King the different motivations of Collins (ending the smuggling activities) and King (revenge) in the end brings them together - the initial conflict being a stratagem by Collins. Also, in the seminal Django the hero has two conflicting motives (avenging himself on the villain Jackson for stealing his fortune) that strongly influence the plot, while King's two motives (revenge and collecting bounty for the Bensons) do not come into conflict, thus presenting a weaker version of such an "internal second motive".
