= Any Gun Can Play =

1967 film by Enzo G. Castellari

- Directed by: Enzo G. Castellari
- Screenplay by: Tito Carpi; Giovanni Simonelli; Enzo G. Castellari
- Story by: Romolo Girolami; Sauro Scavolini
- Starring: George Hilton; Gilbert Roland; Edd Byrnes
- Cinematography: Giovanni Bergamini
- Edited by: Tatiana Casini
- Music by: Francesco De Masi
- Production company: Fida Cinematografica di Amati Edmondo
- Distributed by: Fida Cinematografica
- Release date: 1967 (Italy)
- Running time: 105 minutes
- Countries: Italy; Spain
- Languages: Italian; English

Any Gun Can Play (Italian: Vado... l'ammazzo e torno) is a 1967 spaghetti Western starring Gilbert Roland, Edd Byrnes and George Hilton. The film is directed by Enzo G. Castellari. The film revolves around a group of cowboys in search of gold, leading to double-crosses as they continually change allegiances and gain the upper hand, only to be thwarted by fellow outlaws, mysterious insurance investigators, and each other.

== Plot ==
Monetero, along with his gang, successfully pulls off a train heist carrying $300,000 worth of gold despite the military's defense. One of Monetero's own, Pajondo, seizes the opportunity, betrays his comrades, and escapes with the loot.

The Stranger, a relentless bounty hunter tracking Monetero for a long time, sees the chance to finally catch him. As Monetero heads towards the Mexico border, he confronts Pajondo, coercing him into revealing the treasure's location. Pajondo, before being killed by the arriving army, manages to give Monetero a medal indicating the path to the loot. Monetero is arrested.

Facing torture and a death sentence by the military, Monetero is condemned. A banker named Clayton, assigned to recover the stolen gold at any cost, disagrees with the execution. Disguised as a priest, The Stranger enters Monetero's cell, promising him freedom in exchange for a share of the loot. Monetero, suspicious, breaks Pajondo's medal in half, giving one piece to The Stranger. The next day, Clayton discovers the broken medal during the execution, raising suspicions.

As promised, The Stranger stages Monetero's execution, creating a diversion. Outside the fort, Monetero's men reclaim half of the medal from The Stranger but spare his life. Clayton struggles to reconstruct the medal with his piece, using an almanac with local landowners' crests, but fails. Monetero's men attempt to retrieve the half of the medal from Clayton, and The Stranger intervenes, killing them and forming an alliance with Clayton.

The following morning, Monetero's men kidnap Clayton, and The Stranger allows it to happen. Following discreetly, he discovers Monetero's hideout and overhears an interrogation. It is revealed that Clayton and Monetero had planned the gold theft together. Clayton promises to deliver The Stranger to Monetero, obtaining the remaining half of the medal for further research.

Upon Clayton's return to town with the complete medal, The Stranger reveals his knowledge of the secret deal with the bandit. However, Clayton is illiterate, so The Stranger needs him to decipher the book. With the complete medal, they discover it belongs to the Montigo family, who owned land near the city in 1750, leading to ruins. Monetero's men arrive, causing chaos, and The Stranger manages to escape. Clayton and Monetero head to the ruins, where The Stranger awaits.

Having already deceived the insurance company official with bags of rocks, The Stranger, unwilling to live with two enemies pursuing him for the loot, proposes to share the treasure. Hidden in the organ pipes, the gold is revealed. However, Monetero's men no longer trust their leader, leading to a shootout. The bounty hunter, the banker, and the bandit are forced to collaborate. In the end, they eliminate the enemies and face off in a Mexican standoff. Instead of shooting each other, they unleash their pistols on the organ pipes, celebrating the sight of the gold.

== Cast ==
- Edd Byrnes as Clayton, the Banker
- George Hilton as Straniero
- Gilbert Roland as Monetero
- Kareen O'Hara as Marisol
- Pedro Sanchez as Pajondo
- Gérard Herter as Lawrence Blackman, allied insurance
- Ivano Staccioli as The Capitan
- José Torres as Colonel Jose Huerta
- Adriana Giuffrè as Conchetta
- Valentino Macchi as Charro Ruiz
- Rick Piper as Paco
- Rodolfo Valadier as Pablo
- Marco Mariani as Yankee Sergeant
- Sal Borgese as Prison Guard
- Omero Capanna as Man With Quinto
- Gonzalo de Esquiroz as Bahuda Henchman
- Lina Franchi as Woman Behind Window
- Rocco Lerro as Montero Gang Member
- Joaquín Parra as Soldier
- Osiride Pevarello as Montero Gang Member
- Guglielmo Spoletini as Quinto, Montero Gang Member
- Clemente Ukmar as Montero Gang Member
- Franco Ukmar as Montero Gang Member
- José Yepes as Montero Gang Member

== Release ==
Any Gun Can Play was released in Italy in 1967. The film has also been released under the English titles Go Kill and Come Back and Blood River.

== Connections to other films ==
The Italian phrase Vado... l'ammazzo e torno translates to English as "I'm going... I'll kill him and come back." This is a line spoken by the character Tuco (Eli Wallach) in the movie The Good, the Bad and the Ugly.

The film itself loosely follows the plot of the Sergio Leone movie, featuring three men on a quest for a hidden treasure. In the opening scene of the film, the three bandits who arrive in town clearly resemble the characters Tuco, Sentenza (Lee Van Cleef), and Blondie (Clint Eastwood).
