= The Two Gladiators =

- Directed by: Mario Caiano
- Written by: Alfonso Brescia; Mario Amendola
- Produced by: Armando Morandi
- Starring: Richard Harrison; Moira Orfei
- Cinematography: Pier Ludovico Pavoni
- Music by: Carlo Franci
- Distributed by: Variety Distribution
- Release date: 1964
- Language: Italian

The Two Gladiators (Italian: I due gladiatori, also known as Fight or Die) is a 1964 Italian peplum film directed by Mario Caiano and starring Richard Harrison.

In the film, the Roman Emperor Marcus Aurelius fathered twin sons. It is decided that one son will become Aurelius' heir, while the other will be killed to avoid a potential succession crisis between two rival heirs. The senator tasked with infanticide has moral reservations against the practice, and he instead offers the infant to a foster family. Several years later, Commodus succeeds his father. The senator tries to use Commodus' estranged twin brother Lucius Crassus as a candidate for the throne. The two brothers are soon scheming against each other, in a conflict that ends in fratricide during gladiatorial combat.

== Plot ==
The Roman Emperor Marcus Aurelius dies, leaving the throne to his son Commodus, an arrogant thug who enjoys fighting as an amateur gladiator. Rome soon begins to suffer from Commodus' excesses, and his mistress Marcia tries to entice him towards a less dissolute lifestyle. In response, he discards her and forces his attentions on a chaste Roman aristocrat named Aemelia.

Unbeknownst to most of the world, Aurelius fathered twin sons; it was decided that one of them should be killed in order to prevent future contention over the throne. Tarruntius, the Roman Senator given this task, could not bear to take the infant's life and instead gave it to a foster family. Relocating Commodus' brother, who has grown up to be a fine Roman soldier under the name Lucius Crassus, Tarruntius encourages him to depose his reprehensible sibling and become the new Emperor. Commodus finds out about the plot, and orders his henchmen Laetus and Cleander to destroy the usurper. Lucius and two of his army comrades make their way to Rome, where they try to stir up a revolt and evade Laetus's Praetorian Guards. During a brief interval in captivity, Lucius meets and falls in love with Aemelia, who has been imprisoned for refusing to become Commodus's new mistress. He takes her along when he escapes, and she becomes a partner in his adventures.

Unable to induce the populace of Rome to depose Commodus, Lucius personally confronts and kills his twin during a gladiatorial bout. The grateful Roman Senate name Lucius Emperor, and he uses his new power to reward his friends and helpers. Having done so, he abdicates in favor of a better man, the wise senator Pertinax.

== Cast ==
- Richard Harrison as Lucius Crassus
- Moira Orfei as Marcia
- Mimmo Palmara as Commodus
- Alberto Farnese as Laetus
- Piero Lulli as Cleander
- Mirko Ellis as Pertinax
- Enzo Fiermonte as General Octavius Craticus
- Ivy Holzer as Aemilia
- Giuliano Gemma as Horatius
- Álvaro de Luna as Pannuntius
- Gianni Solaro as Tarruntius
- Adriano Micantoni as Pompeius
- Nello Pazzafini as Head of Decurions
- Renato Montalbano as Centurion
