= Nights and Loves of Don Juan =

1971 comedy film

- Directed by: Alfonso Brescia
- Written by: Arpad De Riso; Aldo Crudo
- Cinematography: Godofredo Pacheco; Julio Ortas Plaza
- Edited by: Rolando Salvatori
- Music by: Carlo Savina
- Release date: 1971
- Countries: Italy; Spain
- Language: Italian

Nights and Loves of Don Juan (Italian: Le calde notti di Don Giovanni, Spanish: Los amores de Don Juan) is a 1971 commedia sexy all'italiana directed by Alfonso Brescia.

== Cast ==
- Robert Hoffmann as Don Giovanni Tenorio
- Barbara Bouchet as Esmeralda Vargas
- Edwige Fenech as Aisha
- Ira von Fürstenberg as Isabella Gonzales
- Annabella Incontrera as Sister Magdalena
- Lucretia Love as the Queen of Cyprus
- José Calvo as Sultan Selim
- Adriano Micantoni as Emir Omar
- Emma Baron as Mother Superior
- Cris Huerta as Chiki, the eunuch
- Franco Marletta as Don Pedro de Alcantara
- Pietro Torrisi as Ali, the strongman
- Franco Fantasia as Majid

== Production ==
The film was co-produced by Italian company Luis Film and Spanish company Fénix Cooperativa Cinematográfica. It was shot between Frascati and Rome, with locations including Villa Borghese, Villa Ada, and Villa Parisi.

== Release ==
The film was released in Italian cinemas by Florida Cinematografica on 10 March 1971.

== Reception ==
Piero Virgintino on La Gazzetta del Mezzogiorno wrote: "glossily decked out, as much as visually sterile, the film is a sexy fotoromanzo [...] with a few hints of crude humor". Stampa Sera's critic Achille Valdata complained about the film's use of the Don Juan character, noting "it's disappointing [...] that such a lively and compelling figure [...] has to be reduced to such a kind of soulless puppet, of little prestige and nobility, possessing an amatory vocation that does not transcend the limits of the ordinary."
