= The Longest Hunt =

1968 film

- Directed by: Bruno Corbucci
- Written by: Bruno Corbucci; Mario Amendola
- Cinematography: Fausto Zuccoli
- Music by: Vasili Kojucharov
- Release date: 1968
- Country: Italy
- Languages: Italian; English

Spara, Gringo, spara (internationally released as The Longest Hunt and Shoot, Gringo... Shoot!) is a 1968 Italian Spaghetti Western directed by Bruno Corbucci.

It is the first western directed by Bruno Corbucci (brother of western specialist Sergio Corbucci), and except the parodistic and bizarre The Three Musketeers of the West it is his only western. The title song "Rainbow... vorrei... vorrei" is performed by Little Tony. Alex Cox in his book 10,000 Ways to Die refers to the film as "derivative and boring", "a reminder that talent as a director is not inheritable, or a family trait."

== Plot ==
US-American adventurer Stark has been sentenced to death in a Mexican village. A rich Mexican rancher saves him from getting hanged but he must return the favour by saving the rancher's son Fidel. He is told that Fidel has somehow been persuaded or even forced to join a gang. Stark shall bring Fidel back to his father. The American believes that the rancher is worried sick about his son's well-being. When he delivers Fidel he understands just on time that things are very different. The rancher intends to whitewash his honour by getting rid of Fidel because he's ashamed of having an illegitimate son.

== Cast ==
- Brian Kelly as Stark
- Keenan Wynn as Major Charlie Doneghan
- Erika Blanc as Jocelyn
- Folco Lulli as Don Hernando Gutierrez
- Fabrizio Moroni as Fidel
- Linda Sini as Dona Sol Gutierrez
- Krista Nell as Sheila
- Rik Battaglia as Cpt. Norton
- Luigi Bonos as Sgt. Peck
- Enzo Andronico as Gunther
- Ignazio Leone as Doctor
- Luca Sportelli
