= Bob Fleming... Mission Casablanca =

Bob Fleming... Mission Casablanca A 077, Sfida ai killers
- Directed by: Anthony Dawson
- Written by: Ernesto Gastaldi
- Produced by: Mino Loy; Luciano Martino
- Cinematography: Riccardo Pallottini
- Music by: Carlo Savina
- Distributed by: Variety Distribution
- Release date: 1966
- Running time: 84 minutes
- Language: Italian

A 077, Sfida ai killers, (lit. A 077, Challenge to the Killers) internationally released as Bob Fleming: Mission Casablanca and The Killers Are Challenged, is a 1966 Italian/French international co-production eurospy film directed by Anthony Dawson. Richard Harrison reprised his role as Bob Fleming from Secret Agent Fireball (1965). The film was shot in Casablanca and Geneva.

The film revolves around research for new energy sources. Two research scientists are murdered, and the CIA decides to protect their surviving partner. Agent Bob Fleming partners himself with the scientist's wife. Among the film's villains is a Texas oil baron who fears that alternative energy sources will undermine the oil industry.

== Plot ==
After two scientists are murdered the CIA sends Agent Fleming to meet up with Coleman, a scientist who had worked on a new energy source with the two murder victims. The CIA smuggles Coleman out of the country to Geneva with Fleming taking his place to discover who is behind the murders. This opportunity arises when Coleman has plastic surgery to alter his face for his protection.

The major stumbling block to the scheme is Coleman's wife. Fleming contacts the wife in Casablanca explaining the scheme but she demands proof by speaking to her husband by telephone. Once this is accomplished she becomes a willing participant but joins Fleming as a target for assassins, secret agents and a Texas oil baron who will go to any length to keep a new form of effective energy from appearing and affecting the oil industry.

== Cast ==
- Richard Harrison : Bob Fleming
- Susy Andersen: Velka
- Wandisa Guida : Sheena
- Marcel Charvey : Coleman
- Janine Reynaud : Halima
- Maryse Guy Mitsouko : Moira
- Aldo Cecconi : Tommy Sturges (billed as Jim Clay)
- Giovanni Di Benedetto : Fleming's Boss (billed as John Hawkwood)
