= List of Italian films of 1967 =

A list of films produced in Italy in 1967 (see 1967 in film):

== Films ==
Title	Director	Cast	Genre	Notes
$10,000 Blood Money	Romolo Guerrieri	Gianni Garko, Loredana Nusciak, Claudio Camaso	Western	
$20,000 on Number Seven	Alberto Cardone	Roberto Miali, Aurora Bautista, Adriano Micantoni	Western	
The 25th Hour	Henri Verneuil	Anthony Quinn, Virna Lisi, Serge Reggiani	War	French–Italian co-production
Any Gun Can Play	Enzo G. Castellari	George Hilton, Gilbert Roland, Edd Byrnes	Western	Italian–Spanish co-production
Arabella	Mauro Bolognini	Virna Lisi, James Fox, Margaret Rutherford	Comedy	
Argoman the Fantastic Superman	Sergio Grieco	Roger Browne, Dominique Boschero	Superhero, spy	
Assassination	Emilio Miraglia	Henry Silva	Eurospy	
Avenger X	Piero Vivarelli	Pier Paolo Capponi, Giovanna Giardina, Armando Calvo	—N/a	Italian–Spanish co-production
Ballad of a Gunman	Alfio Caltabiano	Anthony Ghidra, Angelo Infanti, Mario Novelli	Western	Italian–German co-production
Bandidos	Massimo Dallamano	Enrico Maria Salerno, Terry Jenkins, Venantino Venantini	Western	Italian–Spanish co-production
The Bang Bang Kid	Stanley Prager	Tom Bosley, Guy Madison, Sandra Milo	Western	Italian–Spanish–American co-production
I barbieri di Sicilia				
Belle de Jour	Luis Buñuel	Catherine Deneuve, Jean Sorel, Michel Piccoli	Drama	French–Italian co-production
The Big Gundown	Sergio Sollima	Lee Van Cleef, Tomas Milian, Walt Barnes	Western	Italian–Spanish co-production
The Blonde from Peking				
Blueprint for a Massacre				
Born to Kill	Antonio Mollica	Gordon Mitchell, Femi Benussi, Aldo Berti	Western	
Buckaroo	Adelchi Bianchi	Dean Reed, Monika Brugger, Livio Lorenzon	Western	
Catch as Catch Can				
Cervantes				
China is Near	Marco Bellocchio	Glauco Mauri, Elda Tattoli, Paolo Graziosi	Drama	
Cjamango	Edoardo Mulargia	Ivan Rassimov, Mickey Hargitay, Hélène Chanel	Western	
Clint the Stranger	Alfonso Balcázar	George Martin, Marianne Koch, Paolo Gozlino	Western	Spanish–Italian–German co-production
The Cobra				
Col cuore in gola	Tinto Brass	Jean-Louis Trintignant, Ewa Aulin, Roberto Bisacco	Thriller	Italian–French co-production
Colt in the Hand of the Devil	Sergion Bergonzelli	Bob Henry, Marisa Solinas, George Wang	Western	
Come rubammo la bomba atomica	Lucio Fulci	Franco Franchi, Ciccio Ingrassia, Julie Menard	Comedy	
The Crazy Kids of the War			War, musical	
I criminali della metropoli				
Cuore matto... matto da legare				
The Curse of Belphegor	Georges Combret, Jean Maley	Raymond Souplex, Raymond Bussières, Noëlle Noblecourt	—N/a	French-Italian co-production
Danger!! Death Ray	Gianfranco Baldanello	Gordon Scott	Eurospy	
Day of Anger	Tonino Valerii	Lee Van Cleef, Giuliano Gemma	Western	Italian–West German co-production
Days of Violence	Alfonso Brescia	Peter Lee Lawrence, Rosalba Neri, Beba Lončar	Western	
Dead Run	Christian-Jaque			
Death on the Run	Sergio Corbucci	Ty Hardin	Eurospy	
Death Rides a Horse	Giulio Petroni	Lee Van Cleef, John Phillip Law	Western	
Death Rides Along	Giuseppe Vari	Mike Marshall, Giuseppe Addobbatti, Carole André	Western	
Death Sentence	Mario Lanfranchi	Robin Clarke, Tomas Milian, Richard Conte	Western	
Death Trip	Rudolf Zehetgruber, Gianfranco Parolini	Tony Kendall, Brad Harris, Olga Schoberová	—N/a	West German–Italian–French co-production
Death Walks in Laredo	Enzo Peri	Thomas Hunter, James Shigeta, Nadir Moretti	Western	Italian–Algerian co-production
Desert Commandos	Umberto Lenzi	Ken Clark, Horst Frank, Jeanne Valérie	Eurowar	Italian–French–West German co-production
The Devil's Man	Paolo Bianchini	Guy Madison, Luisa Baratto, Luciano Pigozzi	Science fiction, adventure	
Diabolically Yours	Julien Duvivier	Senta Berger, Alain Delon, Sergio Fantoni	Thriller	French–Italian–West German co-production
Dirty Heroes	Alberto De Martino	Frederick Stafford		
The Dirty Outlaws				
Django Kill... If You Live, Shoot!	Giulio Questi	Tomas Milian, Marilù Tolo, Roberto Camardiel	Western	Italian–Spanish co-production
Django Kills Softly	Massimo Pupillo	Luigi Montefiori, Luciano Rossi, Liana Orfei	Western	Italian–French co-production
Django, the Last Killer	Giuseppe Vari	Luigi Montefiori, Anthony Ghidra, Dana Ghia	Western	
Don Juan in Sicily				
Don't Sting the Mosquito				
Don't Wait, Django Shoot!	Edoardo Mulargia	Ivan Rassimov, Ignazio Spalla, Rada Rassimov	Western	
Dynamite Joe	Antonio Margheriti	Rik Van Nutter, Halina Zalewska, Mercedes Castro	Western	Italian–Spanish co-production
Face to Face	Sergio Sollima	Gian Maria Volonté, Tomas Milian, William Berger	Western	Italian–Spanish co-production
Fantômas contre Scotland Yard	André Hunebelle	Jean Marais, Louis de Funès, Mylène Demongeot	Crime, comedy	French–Italian co-production
Fifteen Scaffolds for a Killer	Nunzio Malasomma	Craig Hill, Susy Andersen, George Martin	Western	Italian–Spanish co-production
Fire of Love				
Five Ashore in Singapore	Bernard Toublanc-Michel	Sean Flynn	Eurospy	French co-production
Flashman	Mino Loy	Paolo Gozlino, Claudie Lange, Ivano Staccioli	Superhero	
Per 100.000 dollari ti ammazzo	Giovanni Fago	Gianni Garko, Claudio Camaso, Claudie Lange	Western	
Fury of Johnny Kid	Gianni Puccini	Peter Lee Lawrence, Cristina Galbó, Maria Cuadra	Western	Italian–Spanish co-production
Gentleman Killer	Giorgio Stegani	Anthony Steffen, Eduardo Fajardo, Silvia Solar	Western	Italian–Spanish co-production
Ghosts – Italian Style				
The Girl and the General	Pasquale Festa Campanile	Virna Lisi, Rod Steiger, Umberto Orsini	Comedy	
The Glass Sphinx	Luigi Scattini	Robert Taylor, Anita Ekberg	Adventure	
God Forgives... I Don't!	Giuseppe Colizzi	Terence Hill, Bud Spencer, Frank Wolff	Western	Italian–Spanish co-production
Goldface, the Fantastic Superman	Bitto Albertini	Espartaco Santoni, Evi Marandi	—N/a	Italian–Spanish–Venezuelan co-production
Grand Slam	Giuliano Montaldo	Janet Leigh, Klaus Kinski, Edward G. Robinson	Crime	Italian–Spanish–West German co-production
Les grandes vacances				
The Greatest Robbery in the West	Maurizio Lucidi	George Hilton, Hunt Powers, Walter Barnes	Western	Italian–Spanish co-production
A Handful of Heroes	Fritz Umgelter	Horst Frank, Valeria Ciangottini, Karl-Heinz Fiege	—N/a	West German–Italian co-production
The Handsome, the Ugly, and the Stupid	Giovanni Grimaldi Franco and Ciccio, Mimmo Palmara	Italian–German co-production		
Hate for Hate	Domenico Paolella	Antonio Sabàto Sr., John Ireland, Mirko Ellis	Western	
The Hellbenders	Sergio Corbucci	Joseph Cotten, Norma Bengell, Julián Mateos	Western	Italian–Spanish co-production
Her Harem				
How to Kill 400 Duponts	Steno	Johnny Dorelli, Margaret Lee, Alfred Adam	Comedy	
L'immorale	Pietro Germi			
Io non protesto, io amo	Ferdinando Baldi	Caterina Caselli, Mario Girotti		
An Italian in America				
John the Bastard	Armando Crispino	John Richardson, Claudio Camaso, Martine Beswick	Western	
Johnny Banco				
Kill Me Quick, I'm Cold				
Kill the Wicked!	Tanio Boccia	Larry Ward, Furio Meniconi	Western	Italian–Spanish co-production
Killer Caliber .32	Alfonso Brescia	Peter Lee Lawrence, Agnes Spaak, Alberto Del'Acqua	Western	
Killer Kid	Leopoldo Savona	Anthony Steffen, Luisa Baratto	Western	
Kitosch, the Man Who Came from the North	José Luis Merino	George Hilton, Krista Nell, Piero Lulli	Western	Spanish–Italian co-production
The Last Adventure (1967 film)	Robert Enrico	Alain Delon, Lino Ventura, Joanna Shimkus	Adventure	French–Italian co-production
Listen, Let's Make Love				
Live for Life				
Lola Colt	Siro Marcellini	Lola Falana, Peter Martell, Erna Schürer	Western	
Long Days of Hate				
Long Days of Vengeance	Florestano Vancini	Giuliano Gemma, Francisco Rabal, Gabriella Giorgelli	Western	Italian–Spanish co-production
The Looters				
Lucky, the Inscrutable	Jesús Franco	Ray Danton, Dieter Eppler, Rosalba Neri		Italian-Spanish-West German co-production
Il lungo, il corto, il gatto	Lucio Fulci	Franco Franchi, Ciccio Ingrassia, Ivy Holzer	Comedy	
The Magnificent Texan	Luigi Capuano	Glenn Saxson, Massimo Serato, Beni Deus	Western	Italian–Spanish co-production
A Man and a Colt	Tulio Demicheli	Claudio Undari, Fernando Sancho, Mirko Ellis	Western	Spanish–Italian co-production
Man, Pride and Vengeance	Luigi Bazzoni	Franco Nero, Klaus Kinski, Tina Aumont	Western	Italian–German co-production
The Man Who Killed Billy the Kid	Julio Buchs	Peter Lee Lawrence, Fausto Tozzi, Dyanik Zurakowska	Western	Spanish–Italian co-production
Il marchio di Kriminal	Fernando Cerchio	Roel Bos, Helga Liné, Andrea Bosic	—N/a	
I Married You for Fun				
Massacre in the Black Forest		Cameron Mitchell	Sword and Sandal	German co-production
Massacre Mania	Paolo Bianchini	Robert Woods, Rada Rassimov, Giovanni Cianfriglia	—N/a	
Master Stroke				
Matchless		Patrick O'Neal, Nicoletta Machiavelli	Eurospy	
The Million Dollar Countdown				
Mission Stardust	Primo Zeglio	Lang Jeffries, Essy Persson, John Karlsen	Science Fiction	Italian–West German–Spanish co-production
More Than a Miracle				
La morte non conta i dollari	Riccardo Freda	Mark Damon, Stephen Forsyth, Luciana Gilli	Spaghetti western	
Nel sole				
Oedipus Rex	Pier Paolo Pasolini	Franco Citti, Silvana Mangano, Alida Valli	Greek tragedy	
OK Connery	Alberto De Martino	Neil Connery, Adolfo Celi	Spy	
Omicidio per appuntamento				
Pecos Cleans Up	Maurizio Lucidi	Robert Woods, Luciana Gilli, Erno Crisa	Western	
Peggio per me... meglio per te				
The Peking Medallion	Frank Winterstein	Elke Sommer, Robert Stack, Nancy Kwan	—N/a	West German–French–Italian co-production
Per amore... per magia...				
Poker with Pistols	Giuseppe Vari	George Hilton, Luigi Montefiori, Annabella Incontrera	Western	
Playtime	Jacques Tati	Jacques Tati, Barbara Dennek, Georges Montant	Comedy	French–Italian co-production
Pronto... c'è una certa Giuliana per te				
Rattler Kid	León Klimovsky	Richard Wyler, Brad Harris, Guglielmo Spoletini	Western	Italian–Spanish co-production
Red Blood, Yellow Gold	Nando Cicero	George Hilton, Edd Byrnes, George Martin	Western	Italian–Spanish co-production
Renegade Riders	Enzo G. Castellari	Edd Byrnes, Guy Madison, Enio Girolami	Western	
Requiescant	Carlo Lizzani	Lou Castel, Mark Damon, Pier Paolo Pasolini	Western	Italian–German co-production
Rick and John, Conquerors of the West	Osvaldo Civirani	Riccardo Miniggio, Gianfabio Bosco, Craig Hill	Western	
Rififi in Amsterdam				
Rita of the West	Ferdinando Baldi	Rita Pavone, Terence Hill, Lucio Dalla	Western	
The Road to Corinthe				
A Rose for Everyone				
The Rover				
Le Samouraï	Jean-Pierre Melville	Alain Delon, Nathalie Delon, Cathy Rosier	Crime, thriller	French–Italian co-production
Scorpions and Miniskirts				
The Seven Cervi Brothers				
Seven Pistols for a Massacre	Mario Caiano	Craig Hill, Piero Lulli, Eduardo Fajardo	Western	Italian–Spanish co-production
The Seventh Floor	Ugo Tognazzi			
Shock Troops	Costa-Gavras	Michel Piccoli, Bruno Cremer, Jean-Claude Brialy	War	French–Italian co-production
The Stranger Returns	Luigi Vanzi	Tony Anthony, Daniele Vargas, Marco Guglielmi	Western	Italian–German co-production
Soldati e capelloni				
Son of Django	Osvaldo Civirani	Guy Madison, Gabriele Tinti, Ingrid Schoeller	Western	
Spy Today, Die Tomorrow	Franz Josef Gottlieb	Lex Barker, Maria Perschy	Eurospy	German Spanish co-production
The Strange Night	Alfredo Angeli			
The Stranger	Luchino Visconti			
A Stranger in Town	Luigi Vanzi	Tony Anthony, Frank Wolff, Jolanda Modio	Western	Italian–American co-production
The Subversives				
The Sweet Sins of Sexy Susan				
The Taming of the Shrew	Franco Zeffirelli			
Il tempo degli avvoltoi	Nando Cicero	George Hilton, Frank Wolff, Pamela Tudor	Western	
The Thief of Paris	Louis Malle	Jean-Paul Belmondo, Geneviève Bujold, Marie Dubois	Crime	French–Italian co-production
The Three Fantastic Supermen	Gianfranco Parolini	Luciano Stella, Aldo Canti	—N/a	Italian–Yugoslav–French–West German co-production
Tiffany Memorandum		Ken Clark	Eurospy	
The Tiger and the Pussycat	Dino Risi	Vittorio Gassman, Ann-Margret, Eleanor Parker	Commedia all'italiana	
To Commit a Murder				
Tom Dollar	Marcello Ciorciolini	Maurice Poli, Giorgia Moll, Erika Blanc	Spy	Italian–French co-production
Top Crack	Mario Russo	Terry-Thomas, Gastone Moschin, Didier Haudepin, Oreste Lionello	Comedy	
Top Secret	Fernando Cerchio	Gordon Scott	Eurospy	Spanish co-production
La traviata				
Turn...I'll Kill You!	Alfonso Brescia	Richard Wyler, Fernando Sancho, Eleonora Bianchi	Western	Italian–Spanish co-production
Two Crosses at Danger Pass	Rafael Romero Marchent	Peter Martell, Mario Novelli, Nuccia Cardinali	Western	Spanish–Italian co-production
Two Faces of the Dollar	Roberto Bianchi Montero	Maurice Poli, Jacques Herlin, Gabriella Giorgelli	Western	Italian–French co-production
Two R-R-Ringos from Texas	Marino Girolami	Franco Franchi, Ciccio Ingrassia, Enio Girolami	Western	
Up the MacGregors!	Franco Giraldi	David Bailey, Leo Anchóriz	Comedy, western	
Untamable Angelique	Bernard Borderie	Michèle Mercier, Robert Hossein, Roger Pigaut	Adventure	French-West German-Italian co-production
Wanted	Giorgio Ferroni	Giuliano Gemma, Teresa Gimpera, Nello Pazzafini	Western	
Wanted Johnny Texas	Emimmo Salvi	Willy Colombini, Fernando Sancho, Monika Brugger	Western	
We Still Kill the Old Way	Elio Petri	Gian Maria Volonté, Irene Papas	Melodrama	
Weekend	Jean-Luc Godard	Mireille Darc, Jean Yanne, Jean-Pierre Kalfon	Avant-garde	French–Italian co-production
The Wild Eye	Paolo Cavara			
The Witches	Luchino Visconti, Pier Paolo Pasolini, Vittorio De Sica, Franco Rossi, Mauro Bolognini	Silvana Mangano, Clint Eastwood, Totò, Ninetto Davoli, Clara Calamai, Francisco Rabal, Annie Girardot	Commedia all'italiana	
Woman Times Seven	Vittorio De Sica	Shirley MacLaine		
Your Turn to Die				
Zärtliche Haie	Michel Deville	Anna Karina, Mario Adorf, Gérard Barray	—N/a	French-Wester German-Italian co-production
