= List of Italian films of 1968 =

A list of films produced in Italy in 1968 (see 1968 in film):

== Films ==
Title	Director	Cast	Genre	Notes
1001 Nights	José María Elorrieta	Raf Vallone, Luciana Paluzzi		
15 Scaffolds for a Murderer	Nunzio Malasomma			
I 2 deputati		Franco and Ciccio	Comedy	
20.000 dollari sul 7	Alberto Cardone		Western	
3 Supermen a Tokyo	Bitto Albertini	George Martin, Salvatore Borghese, Willi Colombini	Superhero film	Italian-West German co-production
Ace High	Giuseppe Colizzi	Eli Wallach, Terence Hill, Bud Spencer	Western	
Acid - delirio dei sensi	Giuseppe Maria Scotese			
Addio giovinezza!				
Adélaïde	Jean-Daniel Simon	Ingrid Thulin, Jean Sorel, Sylvie Fennec		French-Italian co-production
Adieu l'ami	Jean Herman	Alain Delon, Charles Bronson	—N/a	French-Italian co-production
L'affare Dreyfuss				
Agamennone	Davide Montemurri			Television film
All on the Red	Aldo Florio			
American secret service: cronache di ieri e di oggi	Enzo Di Gianni	Dalida, Franco and Ciccio	Crime	
L'amore in tutte le sue espressioni				
Amore o qualcosa del genere	Dino B. Partesano			
Amore, amore	Alfredo Leonardi			
Angelique and the Sultan	Bernard Borderie	Michèle Mercier, Robert Hossein, Jean-Claude Pascal	—N/a	French-West German-Italian-Tunsian co-production
Anzio	Edward Dmytryk	Robert Mitchum	War	Italian-American co-production
Appunti per un film sull'India				
Assassino senza volto				
Le bal des voyous	Jean-Claude Dague	Jean-Claude Bercq, Donna Michelle, Michel Le Royer		French-Italian co-production
Il balla-balla				
La bambolona	Franco Giraldi			
Bandits in Milan	Carlo Lizzani	Gian Maria Volonté, Don Backy, Tomas Milian	Crime	
Barbarella	Roger Vadim	Jane Fonda, Ugo Tognazzi, Anita Pallenberg	Science fiction	Italian-French co-production
Il barocco leccese				
Be Sick... It's Free	Luigi Zampa	Alberto Sordi, Leopoldo Trieste, Pupella Maggio	Comedy	
The Belle Starr Story	Piero Cristofani	Elsa Martinelli, Robert Woods, George Eastman	Western	
Better a Widow	Duccio Tessari			
Between God, the Devil and a Winchester	Marino Girolami	Gilbert Roland, Richard Harrison, Dominique Boschero	Western	Italian-Spanish co-production
Beyond Control	Helmut Förnbacher	William Berger, Helga Anders, Giorgia Moll	—N/a	Italian-West German co-production
Beyond the Law	Giorgio Stegani	Lee Van Cleef, Antonio Sabato, Bud Spencer		Italian-German co-production
Les Biches	Claude Chabrol	Jean-Louis Trintignant, Jacqueline Sassard, Stéphane Audran		French-Italian co-production
The Black Hand	Max Pecas	James Harris, Janine Reynaud, Anny Nelsen		French-Italian co-production
Black Jack	Gianfranco Baldanello	Robert Woods, Mimmo Palmara, Rik Battaglia	Western	
Black Jesus	Valerio Zurlini			
The Black Sheep	Luciano Salce			
A Black Veil for Lisa	Massimo Dallamano	John Mills, Luciana Paluzzi, Robert Hoffmann		Italian-West German co-production
Blood for Blood	Luigi Capuano	Germán Cobos, Fernando Sancho, Stephen Forsyth	Western	
Bocche cucite				
Bora Bora				
La bancarotta				
La brava gente				
The Bride Wore Black	François Truffaut	Jeanne Moreau, Charles Denner, Jean-Claude Brialy	Thriller	French-Italian co-production
Brutti di notte				
Bury Them Deep	Paolo Moffa	Craig Hill, Ettore Manni, Giovanni Cianfriglia	Western	
Caccia ai violenti				
Candy	Christian Marquand	Charles Aznavour, Marlon Brando, Richard Burton	Comedy	American-Italian-French co-production
Capitaine Singrid				
Caprice Italian Style	Mario Monicelli, Steno, Mauro Bolognini, Pier Paolo Pasolini, Pino Zac, Franco Rossi		—N/a	
Carogne si nasce	Alfonso Brescia	Glenn Saxson, Gordon Mitchell, Renato Baldini	Western	
Caroline Chérie				
Il caso Chessman				
Un caso di cronaca				
The Cats	Duccio Tessari	Giuliano Gemma, Klaus Kinski, Margaret Lee	Crime	
La Chamade	Alain Cavalier	Catherine Deneuve, Michel Piccoli, Roger Van Hool		
Chimera				
The Chronicle of Anna Magdalena Bach				
Chrysanthemums for a Bunch of Swine	Sergio Pastore	Edmund Purdom, Gianni Manera, Marilena Possenti	Western	
Ciccio Forgives, I Don't	Marcello Ciorciolini	Franco and Ciccio, Adriano Micantoni	Western	
Cin... cin... cianuro				
Cinegiornali del movimento studentesco				
Il circolo Pickwick				
Code Name: Red Roses	Fernando Di Leo	James Daly, Anna Maria Pierangeli, Peter van Eyck	War	
Colpo di sole				
Colpo sensazionale al servizio del Sifar				
Comandamenti per un gangster	Alfio Caltabiano	Ljuba Tadic, Alfio Caltabiano, Dante Maggio	Crime	Italian-Yugoslavian co-production
Come Play with Me	Salvatore Samperi			
Commandos	Armando Crispino	Lee Van Cleef, Jack Kelly, Joachim Fuchsberger	War	Italian-West German co-production
A Complicated Girl	Damiano Damiani			
Coplan Saves His Skin	Yves Boisset	Claudio Brook, Margaret Lee	—N/a	French-Italian co-production
Un corpo caldo per l'inferno				
Les Cracks	Alex Joffé	Bourvil, Robert Hirsch, Monique Tarbès		French-Italian co-production
Crónica de un atraco	Jaime Jesús Balcázar	Tomas Milian, Anita Ekberg	Crime	
Cowards Don't Pray	Mario Siciliano	Gianni Garko, Ivan Rassimov, Elisa Montés	Western	Italian-Spanish co-production
Da Kronstadt, dove?				
Danger: Diabolik	Mario Bava	John Phillip Law, Michel Piccoli, Marisa Mell	Action	Italian-French co-production
Day After Tomorrow	Nick Nostro	Richard Harrison, Pamela Tudor, Paolo Gozlino	Western	Italian-Spanish co-production
The Day of the Owl	Damiano Damiani	Claudia Cardinale, Franco Nero, Lee J. Cobb	—N/a	
Dead Men Don't Count	Rafael Romero Marchent	Anthony Steffen, Mark Damon, Luis Induni	Western	
Death in the Red Jaguar	Harald Reinl	George Nader, Heinz Weiss, Grit Boettcher	—N/a	West German-Italian co-production
Death Laid an Egg	Giulio Questi	Gina Lollobrigida, Jean-Louis Trintignant, Ewa Aulin	Thriller	Italian-French co-production
Death Sentence	Mario Lanfranchi			
Dei				
Delia Scala Story				
Der Turm der verbotenen Liebe				
Un diablo bajo la almohada				
Diary of a Schizophrenic Girl	Nelo Risi			
Il diario segreto di una minorenne				
Dismissed on His Wedding Night	Ugo Tognazzi			
Django, Prepare a Coffin	Ferdinando Baldi	Terence Hill, Horst Frank, George Eastman	Western	
Donne... botte e bersaglieri				
The Duck Rings at Half Past Seven	Rolf Thiele	Heinz Rühmann, Hertha Feiler, Graziella Granata	Comedy	Co-production with West Germany
Due occhi per uccidere	Renato Borraccetti			
I due pompieri		Franco and Ciccio	Comedy	
I due rusteghi				
Dynamit in grüner Seide	Harald Reinl	George Nader, Heinz Weiss, Silvia Solar		West German-Italian co-production
È stato bello amarti	Adimaro Sala			
Eat It	Francesco Casaretti	Frank Wolff		
Ecce Homo				
Ed ora... raccomanda l'anima a Dio!	Demofilo Fidani	Fardin, Giovanni Scarciofolo, Fabio Testi	Western	
El 'Che' Guevara				
Emma Hamilton	Christian-Jaque	Michèle Mercier, Harald Leipnitz, Gisela Uhlen	—N/a	West German-Italian-French co-production
Escalation				
Execution	Domenico Paolella	John Richardson, Mimmo Palmara, Franco Giornelli	Western	
Fantabulous Inc.	Sergio Spina	Richard Harrison		Italian-French co-production
La fantarca				
Faustina				
Fedra West	Joaquin Romero Marchent	James Philbrook, Norma Bengeli, Simon Andreu	Western	Spanish-Italian co-production
Felicità Colombo				
Fermate il mondo... voglio scendere				
Find a Place to Die	Giuliano Carnimeo	Jeffrey Hunter, Pascale Petit	Western	
Frame Up	Emilio P. Miraglia	Henry Silva, Beba Lončar, Keenan Wynn		
Franco, Ciccio e le vedove allegre				
Fuoco!	Gian Vittorio Baldi			
Galileo				
Gangster '70	Mino Guerrini	Joseph Cotten, Franca Polesello, Giulio Brogi		
Garter Colt	Gian Rocco	Nocletta Machiavelli, Claudio Camaso, Walt Barnes	Western	
Gatling Gun	Paolo Bianchini	Robert Woords, John Ireland, Ennio Balbo	Western	Italian-Spanish co-production
Le gendarme se marie	Jean Girault	Louis de Funès, Michel Galabru, Claude Gensac		
Giorni di sangue				
I giovani tigri				
The Girl with the Pistol	Mario Monicelli	Monica Vitti, Stanley Baker	Comedy	
Giugno '44 - Sbarcheremo in Normandia	León Klimovsky	Michael Rennie	War	
God Made Them... I Kill Them	Paolo Bianchini	Dean Reed, Peter Martell, Piero Lulli	Western	
The Great Silence	Sergio Corbucci	Jean-Louis Trintignant, Klaus Kinski	Western	Italian-French co-production
Gungala la pantera nuda				
Gun Shy Piluk	Guido Celano	Edmund Purdom, Peter Holden, Micaela Pignatelli	Western	
Guns for San Sebastian	Henri Verneuil	Anthony Quinn, Anjanette Comer, Charles Bronson	Western	French-Italian-Mexican co-production
Hate Thy Neighbor	Ferdinando Baldi	Spiros Focas, George Eastman, Nicoletta Machiavelli	Western	
Hell in Normandy	Alfonso Brescia			
Hermitage				
Ho!	Robert Enrico	Jean-Paul Belmondo, Paul Crauchet, Joanna Shimkus		
A Hole in the Forehead	Giuseppe Vari	Anthony Ghidra, Rosy Zichel, Claudio Undari	Western	
I Want Him Dead	Paolo Bianchini	Craig Hill, Lea Massari, José Manuel Martín	Western	Italian–Spanish co-production
Una iena in cassaforte	Cesare Canevari	Dimitry Nabokov, Cristina Gaioni, Maria Luisa Geisberger	—N/a	
If You Meet Sartana Pray for Your Death	Gianfranco Parolini	John Garko, William Berger, Sidney Chaplin		Italian-West German co-production
I'll Sell My Skin Dearly	Ettore M. Fizzarotti	Mike Marshall, Michele Giardon, Valerio Bartoleschi	Western	
Indovina chi viene a merenda?	Marcello Ciorciolini			
Io ti amo	Antonio Margheriti			
L'italiana in Algeri				
Italia vista dal cielo				
Italian Secret Service	Luigi Comencini			
Johnny Hamlet	Enzo G. Castellari	Andrea Giordana, Gilbert Roland, Horst Frank	Western	
Kampf um Rom. 1. Teil	Robert Siodmak	Laurence Harvey, Orson Welles, Sylva Koscina		
Kill Them All and Come Back Alone	Enzo G. Castellari	Chuck Connors, Frank Wolff, Franco Citti	Western	Italian-Spanish co-production
Killer Adios	Primo Zeglio	Peter Lee Lawrence, Marisa Solinas, Eduardo Fajardo	Western	Italian-Spanish Co-production
The Killer Likes Candy	Federico Chentrens, Maurice Cloche	Kerwin Mathews, Bruno Cremer, Marilù Tolo		Italian-French-West German co-production
Komm nur, mein liebstes Vögelein	Rolf Thiele	Maria Raber, Peter Hohberger, Tanja Gruber		West German-Italian co-production
Kommissar X - Drei blaue Panther	Gianfranco Parolini	Hannelore Auer, Siegfried Rauch, Erwin Strahl		West German-Italian co-production
Kong Island				
Lady Desire				
The Last Chance	Giuseppe Rosati			
The Last Mercenary	Mel Welles	Ray Danton	—N/a	West German-Spanish-Italian co-production
The Libertine	Pasquale Festa Campanile	Catherine Spaak, Jean-Louis Trintignant	Comedy	
The Little Bather	Robert Dhéry	Robert Dhéry, Louis de Funès, Colette Brosset		French-Italian co-production
Llaman de Jamaica, Mr. Ward	Mel Welles	Ray Danton		
The Long Day of the Massacre	Alberto Cardone	Peter Martell, Glenn Saxson, Manuel Serrano	Western	
Long Days of Hate	Gianfranco Baldanello	Guy Madison, Lucienne Bridou, Rik Battaglia	Western	
A Long Ride from Hell	Camillo Bazzoni	Steve Reeves	Western	
The Longest Hunt	Bruno Corbucci	Brian Kelly, Fabrizio Moroni, Keenan Wynn	Western	
Love in the Night	Marcel Camus	Jacques Perrin, Catherine Jourdan, Georges Géret		French-Italian co-production
Love Problems	Giuliano Biagetti			
La louve solitaire				
Luana la figlia delle foresta vergine				
Lucrezia Borgia, l'amante del diavolo				
Madigan's Millions	Stanley Prager			
The Magic Bird				
The Magnificent Texan	Luigi Capuano		Western	
The Magnificent Tony Carrera				
Maldonne				
Manon 70	Jean Aurel			
May God Forgive You... But I Won't	Vinecnzo Musolino	George Ardisson, Anthony Ghirda, Peter Martell	Western	
The Mercenary	Sergio Corbucci	Franco Nero, Tony Musante, Jack Palance	Western	Italian-Spanish co-production
A Minute to Pray, a Second to Die	Franco Giraldi	Alex Cord, Arthur Kennedy, Roberty Ryan	Western	
La moglie giapponese				
The Moment to Kill	Giuliano Carmineo	George Hilton, Walter Barnes, Horst Frank	Western	West German-Italian co-production
Il mondo brucia				
Morire gratis				
The Most Beautiful Couple in the World	Camillo Mastrocinque			
Mr. Kinky				
Nardino sul Po				
The Nephews of Zorro	Marcello Ciorciolini	Franco and Ciccio, Dean Reed	Western	
Next of Kin				
Die Nichten der Frau Oberst	Erwin C. Dietrich	Kai Fischer		West German-Italian co-production
No Graves on Boot Hill	Sergio Garrone	Craig Hill, Ida Galli, Giovanni Cianfriglia	Western	
Non cantare, spara	Daniele D'Anza		Western comedy	Television film
La notte è fatta per... rubare				
O tutto o niente	Guido Zurli	George Ardisson, Isarco Ravaioli, Lorenz Guerrieri	Western	
One Dollar Too Many	Enzo G. Castellari	Antonio Sabata, John Saxon, Frank Wolff	Western	Italian-Spanish co-production
One for All	Umberto Lenzi	Mark Damon, John Ireland, Fernando Sancho	Western	Italian-Spanish co-production
L'oro del mondo	Aldo Grimaldi			
Operazione ricchezza	Vittorio Musy Glori			
Once Upon a Time in the West	Sergio Leone	Claudia Cardinale, Henry Fonda, Jason Robards	Western	
One by One	Rafael Romero Marchent	Peter Lee Lawrence, Guglielmo Spoletini, Sidney Chaplin	Western	Spanish-Italian co-production
Operation St. Peter's	Lucio Fulci	Lando Buzzanca, Jean-Claude Brialy, Edward G. Robinson	Comedy	Italian-French-West German co-production
OSS 117 – Double Agent	Jean-Pierre Desagnat, Renzo Cerrato	John Gavin, Margaret Lee, Curd Jürgens		Italian-French co-production
Our Lady of the Turks	Carmelo Bene	Carmelo Bene, Lydia Mancinelli, Ornella Ferrari, Anita Masini		
Le pacha				
Pagliacci				
Partner	Bernardo Bertolucci	Pierre Clémenti, Stefania Sandrelli	Drama	
Per un corpo assente				
Phenomenal and the Treasure of Tutankhamen	Ruggero Deodato	Nicola Mauro Parenti, Lucretia Love, Gordon Mitchell	—N/a	
Pistol for a Hundred Coffins	Umberto Lenzi	Peter Lee Lawrence, John Ireland, Piero Lulli	Western	Italian-Spanish co-production
Il pistolero segnato da Dio	Giorgio Ferroni	Anthony Steffen, Richard Wyler, Luisa Baratto	Western	
A Place for Lovers	Vittorio De Sica			
La Prisonnière	Henri-Georges Clouzot	Laurent Terzieff, Élisabeth Wiener, Bernard Fresson		French-Italian co-production
Processo a Gesù	Gianfranco Bettetini			Television film
Processo di famiglia				
Il professor Matusa e i suoi hippies				
A proposito di 'Arden of Feversham'			Documentary short	
The Protagonists	Marcello Fondato			
La prova generale				
Psychopath	Guido Zurli	George Martin, Ingrid Schoeller, Karin Field	—N/a	Italian-West German co-production
Questione di vita				
A Quiet Place in the Country	Elio Petri	Franco Nero, Vanessa Redgrave, Georges Géret		Italian-French co-production
Racconti del cinquantenario della vittoria 1915-1918				
Radhapura - Endstation der Verdammten				
Ragan				
Il ragazzo che sorride	Aldo Grimaldi			
Le Rapace	José Giovanni	Lino Ventura, Rosa Furman, Xavier Marc		French-Italian-Mexican co-production
Red Roses for Angelica	Steno	Jacques Perrin, Raffaella Carrà		
Requiem for a Gringo	Eugenio Martín, José Luis Merino	Lang Jeffries	Western	
Requiem for a Ringo	Jose Luis Marchent	Lang Jeffries, Fernando Sancho, Aldo Sambrell	Western	Spanish-Italian co-production
Ringo the Lone Rider	Rafael Romero Marchent	Peter Martell, Piero Lulli, Paolo Hertz	Western	Spanish-Italian co-production
La rivoluzione sessuale				
Roma Bologna 2 città 2 volti				
Roma come Chicago	Alberto de Martino	John Cassavetes, Gabriele Ferzetti, Nikos Kourkoulos	Crime	
Romeo and Juliet	Franco Zeffirelli	Leonard Whiting, Olivia Hussey, John McEnery	Drama, romance	Italian-British co-production
A Rope for a Bastard	Amasi Damiani	Mimmo Palmara, Livio Lorenzon, Monica Millesi	Western	
Run, Man, Run	Sergio Sollima	Tomas Milian, Donal O'Brien, Linda Veras	Western	
Run, Psycho, Run	Brunello Rondi	Gary Merrill, Elga Andersen, Georges Rivière	—N/a	Italian-French co-production
The Ruthless Four	Giorgio Capitani	Van Heflin, Gilbert Roland, George Hilton	Western	Italian-German co-production
Saguaro	Tanio Boccia	Adriano Bellini, Larry Ward, Sergio Ciani	Western	
Samoa, Queen of the Jungle	Guido Malatesta			
Sapere - Volta e Galvani				
Sartana Does Not Forgive	Alfonso Balcazar	George Martin, Gilbert Roland, Jack Elam	Western	Spanish-Italian co-production
Satanik	Piero Vivarelli	Magda Konopka, Julio Pena, Umberto Raho	—N/a	Italian-Spanish co-production
Satellite				
Say Your Prayers and Dig Your Grave	Edoardo Mulargia	Robert Woords, Giovanni Scarciofolo, Cristina Penz	Western	
Scusi, lei conosce il sesso?				
Se vuoi vivere... spara	Sergio Garrone	Ivan Rassimov, Giovanni Cianfriglia, Riccardo Garrone	Western	
Sei anni dopo				
Sequestro di persona	Gianfranco Mingozzi			
Serafino	Pietro Germi			
Il sesso degli angeli				
Seven Pistols for a Massacre	Mario Caiano			
Il sole è di tutti				
The Silent Stranger	Luigi Vanzi	Tony Anthony, Lloyd Battista, Kim Omae	Western	Italian-Japanese-American co-production
Seven Men and One Brain	Rossano Brazzi			
Seven Times Seven	Michele Lupo			
Sexy Susan Sins Again	Franz Antel	Jeffrey Hunter, Harald Leipnitz, Pascale Petit		Austrian-West German-Italian co-production
A Sky Full of Stars for a Roof	Giulio Petroni	Giuliano Gemma, Mario Adorf, Magda Konopka	Western	
Silvia e l'amore				
Sommersprossen				
Something Like Love	Enzo Muzii			
The Son of Black Eagle	Guido Malatesta	Mimmo Palmara, Edwige Fenech, Franco Ressel	Adventure	
Spirits of the Dead	Roger Vadim, Louis Malle, Federico Fellini	Jane Fonda, Alain Delon, Terence Stamp	Horror	Italian-French co-production
A Stranger in Paso Bravo	Salvatore Rosso	Anthony Steffen, Eduardo Fajardo, Giulia Rubini	Western	Italian-Spanish co-production
Studio Uno				
Stuntman				
Suicide Commandos	Camillo Bazzoni	Aldo Ray	Eurowar	
Summit				
Il suo nome gridava vendetta	Mario Caiano	Anthony Steffen, William Berger, Claudio Undari	Western	
Superargo and the Faceless Giants	Paolo Bianchini	Giovanni Cianfriglia, Guy Madison, Luisa Baratto	Science fiction	Italian-Spanish co-production
A suon di lupara				
Svezia, inferno e paradiso				
The Sweet Body of Deborah	Romolo Guerrieri	Carroll Baker, Jean Sorel, Ida Galli	—N/a	Italian-French co-production
Tabula rasa				
A Taste of Death	Sergio Merolle	Andrea Giordana, John Ireland, Raymond Pellegrin	Western	Italian-French co-production
Le tatoué	Denys de La Patellière	Jean Gabin, Louis de Funès, Dominique Davray		French-Italian co-production
Temptation	Lamberto Benvenuti	Stefania Careddu, Mark Damon, Nicoletta Machiavelli, Marina Berti	Drama	
Teorema	Pier Paolo Pasolini	Terence Stamp, Silvana Mangano, Massimo Girotti	Drama	
Tepepa	Giulio Petroni	Tomas Milian, Orson Welles, John Steiner	Western	Italian-Spanish co-production
Tequila Joe	Vincenzo Dell'Aquila	Antony Ghidra, Jean Sobieski, Mimmo Palmara	Western	
They Came to Rob Las Vegas				
Three Silver Dollars	Mario Amendola	Charles Southwood, Julián Mateos, Alida Chelli	Western	
Today We Kill... Tomorrow We Die!	Tonino Cervi	Montgomery Ford, Bud Spencer, Wayde Preston	Western	Italian-Japanese co-production
Torture Me But Kill Me with Kisses	Dino Risi			
À tout casser	John Berry	Eddie Constantine, Johnny Hallyday	—N/a	French-Italian co-production
Train for Durango	Mario Caiano	Anthony Steffen, Mark Damon	Western	Italian-Spanish co-production
Una tranquilla villeggiatura				
Trusting Is Good... Shooting Is Better	Osvaldo Civirani	George Hilton, Sandra Milo, John Ireland	Western	
Tu seras terriblement gentille				
The Two Crusaders				
Uno di più all'inferno	Giovanni Fago	George Hilton, Paolo Gozlino, Claudie Lange	Western	
Uomini e cose				
Vacanze sulla Costa Smeralda				
The Valley of Death	Harald Reinl	Lex Barker, Pierre Brice, Rik Battaglia	Western	German-Italian-Yugoslavian co-production
The Vatican Affair	Emilio Miraglia			
La vedova allegra				
Vedove inconsolabili in cerca di... distrazioni				
Vengeance for Vengeance	Mario Colucci	John Ireland, Gianni Medici, Loredana Nusciak	Western	
Vengeance	Antonio Margheriti	Richard Harrison, Claudio Camaso, Sheyla Rosin	Western	Italian-German co-production
Vengeance Is My Forgiveness	Roberto Mauri	Tab Hunter, Mimmo Palmara, Erika Blanc	Western	
Vento notturno	Ottavio Spadaro			Television film
Le vergogne del mondo				
La verità difficile				
Vietnam, guerra e pace	Lamberto Antonelli		Documentary	
VIP my Brother Superman	Bruno Bozzetto			Animated feature film
The Visionaries	Maurizio Ponzi			
Volver a vivir				
La vuole lui... lo vuole lei				
Will Our Heroes Be Able to Find Their Friend Who Has Mysteriously Disappeared in Africa?	Ettore Scola			
The Wrath of God	Alberto Cardone	Brett Halsey, Dana Ghia, Fernando Sancho	Western	Italian-Spanish co-production
The Young Wolves	Marcel Carné	Christian Hay, Haydée Politoff, Yves Beneyton		French-Italian co-production
The Young, the Evil and the Savage	Antonio Margheriti	Eleonora Brown, Selly Smith, Patrizia Valturri	Giallo	
Zbehovia a pútnici				
Zorro the Fox	Guido Zurli	George Ardisson, Giacomo Rossi Stuart, Femi Benussi	Western	
Zum zum zum	Bruno Corbucci, Sergio Corbucci		Musical comedy	
