= José Canalejas (actor) =

Spanish actor

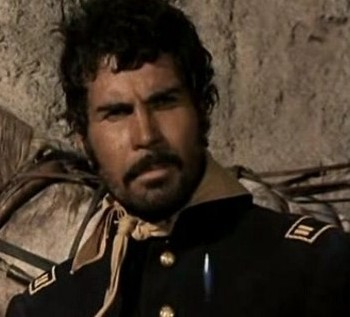
- Jose Canalejas in Per il gusto di uccidere (1966)
- Born: José Álvarez Canalejas; 14 February 1925; Madrid, Spain
- Died: 1 May 2015 (aged 90); Madrid, Spain
- Occupation: Actor
- Years active: 1960–1997
- Father: Manuel Álvarez Trigo
- Relatives: Lina Canalejas (sister); Arturo Canalejas (grandfather)

José Álvarez Canalejas (14 February 1925 – 1 May 2015), known as José Canalejas, was a Spanish actor. He appeared in more than 100 films and television shows between 1960 and 1997. He died on 1 May 2015 at his home in Madrid at the age of 90.

He was the son of the soloist violinist Manuel Álvarez Trigo, grandson of the pianist and composer Arturo Canalejas, and brother of the actress and dancer Lina Canalejas, who died on 1 September 2012 from cancer at the age of 80.

== Selected filmography ==
- Labios rojos (1960) – Paul, el pianista
- Torrejón City (1962) – Mejicano
- Il segno di Zorro (1963) – Teniente
- Gidget Goes to Rome (1963) – Pinchman (uncredited)
- Una chica casi formal (1963)
- Los conquistadores del Pacífico (1963)
- Llegar a más (1963)
- El escándalo (1964)
- Fuera de la ley (1964)
- A Fistful of Dollars (1964) – Rojo Gang Member (uncredited)
- Brandy (1964) – Chirlo
- La tumba del pistolero (1964) – Sbirro
- La boda (1964)
- 100 Horsemen (1964) – Moorish Warrior (uncredited)
- Jesse James' Kid (1965) – Cabo
- The Relentless Four (1965) – Rex Calhoun
- For a Few Dollars More (1965) – Chico (Indio's Gang) (uncredited)
- Mutiny at Fort Sharpe (1966)
- Gunman Called Nebraska (1966) – Elmer Dowson
- Django (1966) – Member of Hugo's Gang
- Per il gusto di uccidere (1966) – Peter
- Sugar Colt (1966) – Bearded Bandit
- The Ugly Ones (1966)
- The Hellbenders (1967) – Mexican Bandit
- El hombre que mató a Billy el Niño (1967) – Jake – Travis's Henchman
- Un hombre y un colt (1967)
- El halcón de Castilla (1967)
- God Forgives... I Don't! (1967) – Mexican henchman
- Cervantes (1967) – (uncredited)
- 15 Scaffolds for a Murderer (1967) – Tim, Mack's Blond Henchman
- Killer Adios (1968) – Manuel, Lobo Henchman (uncredited)
- Uno straniero a Paso Bravo (1968)
- A Minute to Pray, a Second to Die (1968) – Seminole – Bounty Hunter (uncredited)
- Villa Rides (1968) – Villa's Guerrillero Rapist Killed by Fierro (uncredited)
- Lo voglio morto (1968)
- All'ultimo sangue (1968) – Officer (uncredited)
- Uno dopo l'altro (1968) – Frank
- El secreto del capitán O'Hara (1968) – Wills
- The Mercenary (1968) – Lerkin
- White Comanche (1968) – (uncredited)
- Cemetery Without Crosses (1969) – Vallee Brother (uncredited)
- Sundance and the Kid (1969) – Ranger (uncredited)
- The Price of Power (1969) – Deputy (uncredited)
- Sabata the Killer (1970) – Chaco
- Adiós, Sabata (1970) – Duel Observer (uncredited)
- Compañeros (1970) – Mongo Henchman (uncredited)
- Reverend's Colt (1970) – Martin
- Black Beauty (1971) – Gate Sergant [Spanish prints] (uncredited)
- Grazie zio, ci provo anch'io (1971)
- Raise Your Hands, Dead Man, You're Under Arrest (1971) – Angel, Grayton's Henchman in Black
- La casa de las Chivas (1972) – Guzmán
- Sonny & Jed (O Bando J & S) (1972) – Don García Henchman (uncredited)
- Horror Express (1972) – Russian Guard
- Entre dos amores (1972) – Niño
- What Am I Doing in the Middle of a Revolution? (1972)
- The Man Called Noon (1973) – Cherry
- Ricco (1973)
- Three Supermen of the West (1973) – Buffalo Bill
- Return of the Blind Dead (1973) – Murdo
- The Three Musketeers of the West (1973) – Mendoza
- Dieci bianchi uccisi da un piccolo indiano (1974) – (uncredited)
- La dynamite est bonne à boire (1974)
- En la cresta de la ola (1975) – Redactor
- Il richiamo del lupo (1975) – Bates Henchman
- A Dragonfly for Each Corpse (1975) – Ruggero
- Docteur Justice (1975) – Khalid
- Si quieres vivir… dispara (1975) – Tex
- Ambitious (1976)
- La espada negra (1976)
- Le due orfanelle (1976)
- The Standard (1977)
- Der Tiefstapler (1978) – Präsident Cusano
- Cabo de vara (1978)
- Tac-tac (1982) – Amigo de Ángel
- Femenino singular (1982)
- Huevos revueltos (1982)
- La desconocida (1983) – Dr. Salas
- Cuando Almanzor perdió el tambor (1984)
- Padre nuestro (1985) – Guardia Civil 1
- Serpiente de mar (1985)
- Bad Medicine (1985) – Professor Hugo
- White Apache (1987) – White Bear
- El Lute: Run for Your Life (1987) – Carcelero
- Scalps (1987) – Chief Black Eagle
- Niño nadie (1997) – Míster
