= Giuseppe Fortis =

Italian actor (1935–2000)

- Born: 20 July 1935; Rome, Italy
- Died: 27 May 2000 (aged 64); Turin, Italy
- Occupation: Actor
- Years active: 1962–1981 (film & TV)

Giuseppe Fortis (20 July 1935 – 27 May 2000) was an Italian film and television actor. He was also a voice actor, dubbing foreign films for release in Italian.

== Filmography ==
Year	Title	Role	Notes
1962	The Changing of the Guard	Luciano Crippa	
1963	The Sign of the Coyote	Wilkes	
1963	Goliath and the Rebel Slave	Barbuk	
1964	The Thief of Damascus	Mannaen	
1964	Delitto allo specchio	Aldo	
1964	La Sfinge sorride prima di morire - Stop Londra	Alain Nol	
1964	Bianco, rosso, giallo, rosa		
1965	Agent 077: From the Orient with Fury	Faux Carpet Salesman	
1966	How We Robbed the Bank of Italy	Lawyer	
1966	Missione sabbie roventi		
1966	Tecnica di una spia	Professor	
1966	Trap for Seven Spies		
1967	Killer Caliber .32	Poker Player	Uncredited
1968	Ringo the Lone Rider	Gonzalez	
1969	Beatrice Cenci	The Chaplain	
1971	Erika	Baron Giovanni Laurana	
1971	Black Belly of the Tarantula	Psychiatrist	
1971	The Working Class Goes to Heaven	Valli	
1972	The Eroticist	Vittorio Giorello - TV Reporter	
1977	Cosmos: War of the Planets	Marseille	
1978	Battle of the Stars	Herman Wesson	
1980	La bestia nello spazio	Commander Green	

== Bibliography ==
- Roy Kinnard & Tony Crnkovich. Italian Sword and Sandal Films, 1908–1990. McFarland, 2017.
