= Joaquín Parra (actor) =

Spanish actor (died 2022)

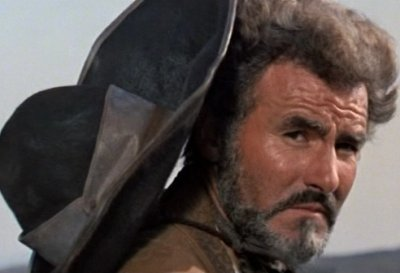
Parra between 1960s and 1970s

Joaquín Parra (d. 2022) was a Spanish film actor, fencing master and stunt performer. He played Pícaro in A Bullet for the General (1967), Pedro Henchman in Johnny Yuma (1966), Mendoza in The Royal Hunt of the Sun (1969), and he also appeared in A Bullet for the General (1969), and Pistol for a Hundred Coffins (1968).

== Filmography ==
- Texas Ranger (1964) as Hombre de Barnes
- Tomb of the Pistolero (1964) as Sbirro
- Canadian Wilderness (1965) as Sullivan's Employee
- Adiós gringo (1965) as Ranchester Cowboy
- Seven Guns for the MacGregors (1966) as Santillana Henchman
- Johnny Yuma (1966) as Pedro henchman
- Ringo, the Mark of Vengeance (1966) as ayudante del sheriff
- A Few Dollars for Django (1966) as Freeman
- A Bullet for the General (1967) as Picaro
- Any Gun Can Play (1967) as Soldier
- Face to Face (1967) as Deputy at Way Station
- A Minute to Pray, a Second to Die (1967) as Sheriff
- Train for Durango (1968) as Lobo Henchman
- Tutto per tutto (1968)
- Ringo the Lone Rider (1968) as Brawler
- La hora del coraje (1968) as Carrancha's Man
- One by One (1968) as Deputy Sheriff Lou
- Pistol for a Hundred Coffins (1968)
- Sundance and the Kid (1969) as Bad Jim's Henchman
- The Royal Hunt of the Sun (1969) as Mendoza
- The Price of Power (1969) as Slim
- Boot Hill (1969) as Finch Henchman
- Awkward Hands (1970)
- Arizona Colt Returns (1970) as Keene Gang Member
- Sartana Kills Them All (1970) as Sheriff Sam
- Sabata the Killer (1970) as Garfield Hechman
- Matalo! (1970) as Bearded Bandit
- Compañeros (1970) as Mexican Patrol Lieutenant
- Valdez Is Coming (1971)
- Dead Men Ride (1971) as Bob, Redfield Henchman
- Raise Your Hands, Dead Man, You're Under Arrest (1971) as Mr. Burton
- Ben and Charlie (1972) as Walker Henchman
- Odio mi cuerpo (1974)
- Hay que matar a B. (1974) as Assailant 2
- Curro Jiménez (1976)
- Las alimañas (1977) as Doctor
- Fantasma en el Oeste (1978)
- Fuoco incrociato (1984)
- Marbella, un golpe de cinco estrellas (1985) as Guardaespaldas 2
- Los gusanos no llevan bufanda (1992) as Joe
