= Antonio Pierfederici =

Italian actor and voice actor

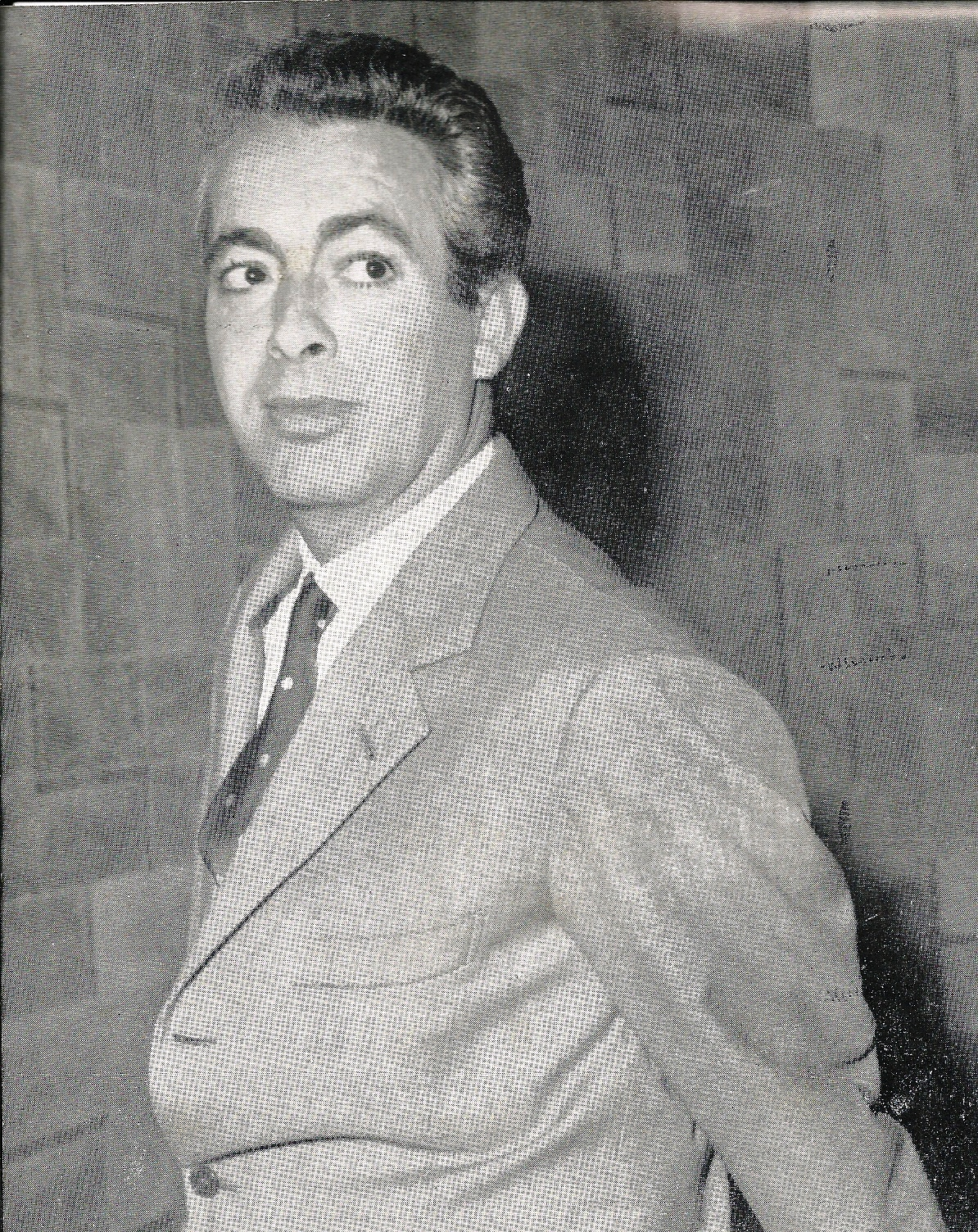
- Pierfederici in 1964
- Born: 18 March 1919; La Maddalena
- Died: 6 January 1999 (aged 79); Rome

Antonio Pierfederici (18 March 1919 – 6 January 1999) was an Italian actor and voice actor.

== Life and career ==
Born in La Maddalena, Pierfederici graduated in law and then he enrolled at the Silvio d’Amico Academy of Dramatic Arts. He started his acting career in 1943 and was mainly active on stage, getting his first personal critical success with his performance in Luchino Visconti's I parenti terribili. One of the favorite actors of Visconti, he also worked on stage with Giorgio Strehler and Orazio Costa, among others.

== Filmography ==
Year	Title	Role	Notes
1946	Un giorno nella vita	Giovanni	
1950	The Last Days of Pompeii	Olinto / Olinte / Olinth	
1955	Andrea Chénier		
1960	Black Sunday	Priest	
1960	Ti aspetterò all'inferno	Jules	
1961	Totò, Peppino e... la dolce vita	Oscar	
1961	Vanina Vanini	Livio Savelli	
1961	La tragica notte di Assisi	Monaldo	
1963	Le monachine	The President	
1968	Romeo and Juliet	Lord Montague	
1971	Four Gunmen of the Holy Trinity	Mr. Martinez	
1971	The Double	Professor Bergamo	
1974	The Kiss		
1974	Ciak si muore	Benner	
1975	Cagliostro	A naturalist monk	
1975	Il caso Raoul	Alberto	
1976	Perché si uccidono		
1986	Otello	Doge	
1987	Secondo Ponzio Pilato	Giuseppe di Arimatea	
