= Tomb of the Pistolero =

1964 film by Amando de Ossorio

- Spanish: La tumba del pistolero
- Directed by: Amando de Ossorio
- Written by: H.S. Valdés
- Screenplay by: Amando de Ossorio
- Story by: Amando de Ossorio
- Produced by: Arturo Marcos
- Starring: George Martin; Mercedes Alonso; Silvia Solar; Todd Martens; Jack Taylor
- Cinematography: Miguel Fernández Mila
- Edited by: Ángel Serrano
- Music by: Daniel White
- Production company: Fénix Cooperativa Cinematográfica
- Distributed by: Chamartín
- Release date: 21 November 1964 (Spain)
- Running time: 81 min
- Country: Spain

Tomb of the Pistolero or Grave of the Gunfighter (Spanish: La tumba del pistolero) is a 1964 Spanish black and white western film directed by Amando de Ossorio, written by H. S. Valdés and starring George Martin, Mercedes Alonso, Silvia Solar, Todd Martens and Jack Taylor. It is composed by Daniel White.

== Cast ==
- George Martin as Tom Bogarde
- Luis Villar as Hotelero
- Mercedes Alonso as Russ Brandon
- Silvia Solar as Taffy
- Jack Taylor as Herbert Brandon
- Luis Induni as Sheriff
- Frank Braña as Jinete negro
- José Canalejas as Sbirro
- Miguel del Castillo as Barman
- Tito García as Cochero
- José Marco as Hamilton
- Todd Martin as Jack Bogarde
- Ángel Ortiz as Stassy
- Joaquín Pamplona as Viejo pistolero
- Lorenzo Robledo as Sbirro
- Aldo Sambrell as Minero
- José Villasante as Minero
- Alfonso de la Vega as Sbirro
- Dina Loy as Chica del saloon
- Joaquín Parra as Sbirro
