= Four Gunmen of the Holy Trinity =

1971 film by Giorgio Cristallini

- Italian: I quattro pistoleri di Santa Trinità
- Directed by: Giorgio Cristallini
- Written by: Ted Rusoff (dialogue)
- Screenplay by: Giorgio Cristallini
- Story by: Giorgio Cristallini
- Produced by: Umberto Russo; Vittorio Russo
- Starring: Peter Lee Lawrence; Evelyn Stewart; Ralph Baldwin
- Cinematography: Alessandro D'Eva
- Edited by: Otello Colangeli
- Music by: Roberto Pregadio
- Production company: Buton Film
- Release date: 21 May 1971 (Italy)
- Running time: 85 min

Four Gunmen of the Holy Trinity or Four Pistols for Trinity (Italian: I quattro pistoleri di Santa Trinità) is a 1971 Italian western film directed by Giorgio Cristallini, scored by Roberto Pregadio and starring Peter Lee Lawrence, Evelyn Stewart, Daniele Vargas and Daniela Giordano.

== Cast ==
- Peter Lee Lawrence as George
- Evelyn Stewart as Julia
- Ralph Baldwin as Dingus
- Valeria Fabrizi as Adeline Martinez
- Salvatore Furnari as Ned
- Daniela Giordano as Sarah Baldwin
- Philippe Hersent as Marshal Thomas
- Antonella Murgia as Ana
- Tonino Pierfederici as Mr. Martinez
- Daniele Vargas as Thompson
- Paul Oxon as Navarro
- Umberto Raho as Quinn Paradine
- Raymond Bussières as Dr. Gordon
- Filippo Antonelli
- Antonio Buonomo
- Katia Cardinali as Sarah's friend
- Bernadette Frank as Sarah's friend
- Giglio Gigli
- Mimmo Maggio
- Luigi Mannoia
- Alessandro Perrella
- Aldo Sala
- Marcello Tamborra
