= Avenger X =

Mister X
- Film poster
- Directed by: Piero Vivarelli
- Screenplay by: Eduardo Manzanos Brochero
- Story by: Adriano Bolzoni; Augusto Caminito
- Starring: Pier Paolo Capponi; Gaia Germani; Armando Calvo
- Cinematography: Emanuele Di Cola
- Edited by: Gianmaria Messeri
- Music by: Manuel Parada
- Production companies: Terra Film; Copercine
- Distributed by: Euro International
- Release dates: 1967 (Italy); 22 January 1968 (Spain)
- Running time: 90 minutes
- Countries: Italy; Spain
- Language: Italian
- Box office: ₤112 million

Avenger X (Italian: Mister-X) is a 1967 film based on the Italian comic series Mister-X.

== Plot ==
George Lamarro is the head of a pharmaceutical company that is also involved in the production and distribution of illegal narcotics. When his secretary attempts to blackmail him for a share of the profits and his hand in marriage, he has her killed with her death arranged in a way to implicate a master criminal called "Mister X" who is a master of disguise, efficient killer and professional golf champion. The real Mister X uses his skills to discover the criminals are involved in a scheme by an unnamed foreign nation using the company and a Scottish and an American criminal to distribute illegal narcotics in the Western World.

== Cast ==
- Pier Paolo Capponi as Mister X
- Gaia Germani as Timmy
- Armando Calvo as George Lamar
- Anna Zinnemann as Dolly
- Umberto Raho as MacDoug
- Renato Baldini as Jack Caruso
- Franco Fantasia as Inspector Roux
- Dante Posani as Jim
- Helga Liné as Gloria

== Production ==
Avenger X was based on the comic series Mister-X as created by writer Cesare Melloncelli and drawing artist Giancarlo Tenenti. The comic was first published by Milan's Edizioni Cervinia in October 1964. Unlike other fumetti neri of the era, Mister-X had very little violent content, with the titular character being a gentleman thief similar to Arsène Lupin. In the film, the titular character Mister X visually differs from the comics design who had a black hood and leotard opposed to the red cape, white boots and hood that covers his face that his comic book counterpart wears.

Parts of the film were shot in Rome including location shooting at the Stadio dei Marmi.

== Release ==
Avenger X was released in Italy in 1967 as Mister X. The English-language title of the film ignores the characters name and is titled Avenger X. Director Piero Vivarelli stated most of the violent scenes in the film were removed from the Italian version of the film to earn a V.M.14 rating. Censors documents only suggested that 47 seconds of the film were cut in Italy This included scenes where a blowtorch approaches Mister-X's bare chest and a shot of a speedboat moving towards a reef. The film grossed 112 million Italian lire in Italy during its theatrical run. The film was distributed by Euro International.

The film was released in Spain on 22 January 1968 where it sold 707,889 admissions.

== See also ==
- List of films based on comics
- List of Italian films of 1967
- List of Spanish films of 1967
