= Pistol for a Hundred Coffins =

1968 film

- Directed by: Umberto Lenzi
- Written by: Marco Leto; Vittorio Salerno
- Produced by: Alvaro Mancori
- Starring: Peter Lee Lawrence; John Ireland
- Cinematography: Alejandro Ulloa
- Music by: Angelo Francesco Lavagnino
- Release date: 1968
- Language: Italian

Pistol for a Hundred Coffins (Italian: Una pistola per cento bare, Spanish: El sabor del odio (The Taste of Hate), also known as A Gun for One Hundred Graves and Vengeance) is a 1968 Italian-Spanish Spaghetti Western film written and directed by Umberto Lenzi and starring Peter Lee Lawrence.

== Cast ==
- Peter Lee Lawrence as Jim Slade
- John Ireland as Douglas
- Gloria Oçaña as Marjorie
- Eduardo Fajardo as Chavel, madman
- Julio Peña as Mayor
- Raf Baldassarre as Verdugo
- Piero Lulli as J. Texas Corbett
- Franco Pesce as Old Ben
- Andrea Scotti as Blacksmith
- Calisto Calisti as Cassidy
- Paola Natale as Elizabeth
- Francisco Braña as Joe, Stagecoach Driver
- José Jaspe as David, madman
- Víctor Israel as Barrett, madman
- Franco Narducci as Bartender
- Ivan Scratuglia
- Luis de Tejada
- Agustín Bescos
- Antonio Cintado
- Fabián Conde
- Juan Fairen
- Jesús Guzmán
- Vicente Haro
- Rafael Hernández
- José Marco
- Armando Calvo
- Miguel del Castillo as Glaerstone Banker
- Leonidas Guerra
- Miguel Guzmán
- Joaquín Parra
- Giovanni Petrucci as Jeff Mortimer Logan
- Alfonso Rojas as Percy, Townsman
- Gino Turini as Freddy Butcher

== See also ==
- List of Italian films of 1968
- List of Spanish films of 1968
