= Ringo, the Mark of Vengeance =

1966 Italian film directed by Mario Caiano

- Spanish: Los cuatro salvajes
- Directed by: Mario Caiano
- Written by: Mario Caiano
- Screenplay by: Eduardo Manzanos
- Story by: Eduardo Manzanos
- Produced by: Carlo Caiano; Mario Caiano
- Starring: Anthony Steffen; Frank Wolff; Alejandro Nilo
- Cinematography: Julio Ortas
- Edited by: Antonio Gimeno
- Music by: Francesco De Masi
- Production companies: Cinematografica EmmeCi; Estela Films
- Distributed by: Austria; Paradise Film Exchange; Sánchez Ramade
- Release date: 26 August 1966 (Italy)
- Running time: 102 min
- Country: Italy

Ringo, the Mark of Vengeance (Italian: Ringo, il volto della vendetta, Spanish: Los cuatro salvajes) is a 1966 Italian-Spanish spaghetti western film directed by Mario Caiano, scored by Francesco De Masi and starring Anthony Steffen. It was shot in Almería.

== Cast ==
- Anthony Steffen as Ringo
- Frank Wolff as Trikie Ferguson
- Eduardo Fajardo as Tim
- Armando Calvo as Fidel
- Alejandra Nilo as Manuela
- Alfonso Godá as Sheriff Sam Dellinger
- Román Ariznavarreta as Jugador
- Manuel Bermúdez 'Boliche' as Mortimer
- Agustín Bescos as Ciudadano
- Ricardo Canales as Alcalde de san agustin
- Nazzareno Natale as Paco
- Antonio Orengo as Sacerdote
- Joaquín Parra as Ayudante del sheriff
- Patty Shepard as Chica del saloon
- Amedeo Trilli as Boss of Mexican Village
- Rafael Vaquero as Hombre de Trikie
