= The Killer Must Kill Again =

- Italian theatrical release poster
- Directed by: Luigi Cozzi
- Written by: Adriano Bolzoni
- Screenplay by: Luigi Cozzi; Daniele Del Giudice; Patrick Jamain (French screenplay)
- Story by: Luigi Cozzi; Daniele Del Giudice
- Produced by: Sergio Gobbi; Umberto Lenzi (as Umberto Linzi); Giuseppe Tortorella
- Starring: George Hilton
- Cinematography: Riccardo Pallottini
- Edited by: Alberto Moro
- Music by: Nando De Luca
- Production companies: Albione Cinematografica; Git International Film; Paris-Cannes Productions
- Release date: 1975
- Running time: 86 minutes
- Countries: Italy; France
- Language: Italian

The Killer Must Kill Again (Italian: L'assassino è costretto ad uccidere ancora) is a 1975 Italian giallo film directed by Luigi Cozzi, and starring George Hilton.

Cozzi originally wanted to call the film Il Ragno (The Spider) but it was changed to The Killer Must Kill Again by the producers. It is based on the novel Al mare con la ragazza (translation: By the Sea With the Girl) by Giorgio Scerbanenco. The film was also released as The Dark Is Death's Friend. Michel Antoine (who plays the killer in this film) later played the tortured painter in Lucio Fulci's The Beyond.

== Plot ==
A serial rapist and killer of women across Italy is seen sinking the latest woman he murdered into a river by Giorgio Mainardi (George Hilton). Giorgio married his wife Norma for money and has numerous affairs, making for an unhappy marriage. When he takes the killer's lighter, which has his initials, he says he won't turn the killer into the police if he murders Norma on Giorgio's behalf. The killer eventually does so, but a young couple, Luca and Laura, steals the killer's car with Norma's body in the trunk. They wanted the car for the chance to go to the beach, and because of the carjacking, the killer takes his own car to find them. Giorgio, meanwhile, pretends to be in grief from Norma's disappearance, but the police immediately suspect him.

When the couple arrive at a rundown villa, Luca leaves Laura to get some supplies. He picks up a stranded blond woman on the side of the road when she has car troubles. Back at the villa, the killer finds Laura alone, and furious at her and Luca carjacking him, he rapes her, coinciding with Luca making out with the blond woman in the back of his car. When Luca and the woman return to the villa, the killer knocks Luca out and stabs the blonde woman dead. As he prepares to kill the couple, Laura breaks free from her ties and stabs the killer to death. The police thank the couple for stopping him, as they'd been searching for him for months. To catch Giorgio, they leave the car with Norma's body in front of his house. When Giorgio is caught trying to sink Norma and the car, he's arrested.

== Cast ==
- George Hilton as Giorgio Mainardi
- Antoine Saint-John as Killer (credited as Michel Antoine)
- Femi Benussi as Ditzy Blonde
- Cristina Galbó as Laura
- Eduardo Fajardo as Inspector
- Tere Velázquez as Norma Mainardi
- Alessio Orano as Luca

== Critical reception ==
AllMovie called the film "too erratic for the general horror audience", but "offers just enough suspense and style to please patient giallo fans."

== See also ==
- List of giallo films
- List of Italian films of 1975
