= Sabata the Killer =

1970 film by Tulio Demicheli

- Italian: Arriva Sabata!
- Directed by: Tulio Demicheli
- Written by: Tulio Demicheli
- Screenplay by: Florentino Soria; Nino Stresa
- Story by: Florentino Soria; Nino Stresa
- Starring: Anthony Steffen; Peter Lee Lawrence; Eduardo Fajardo; Alfredo Mayo; Rossana Rovere; María Villa
- Cinematography: Aldo Ricci
- Edited by: Antonio Ramírez de Loaysa
- Music by: Marcello Giombini
- Production companies: Producciones Cinematográficas A.B.; Tritone Cinematografica
- Distributed by: Adria Filmverleih; CEA Distribución; Twentieth Century Fox; Rai Movie; Video 49; Video Screen; X-Gabu Film
- Release date: 12 September 1970 (Italy)
- Running time: 87 min
- Country: Argentina

Sabata the Killer (Italian: Arriva Sabata!) is a 1970 Argentine comedy western film directed by Tulio Demicheli, written by Nino Stresa, scored by Marcello Giombini, and starring Anthony Steffen, Peter Lee Lawrence and Eduardo Fajardo. It is an unofficial sequel to Sabata.

== Cast ==
- Anthony Steffen as Sabata / Garringo
- Peter Lee Lawrence as Peter
- Eduardo Fajardo as Mangosta
- Alfredo Mayo as Garfield
- Luis Induni as Charlie McKenzie
- Rossana Rovere as Patricia
- Alfonso Rojas as Sheriff
- María Villa as Manolita
- Cris Huerta as Fuller
- José Canalejas as Chaco
- Alfredo Santacruz as Butch Garrett
- Tito García as Fuller
- Lorenzo Robledo as Man In Sheriff's Office
- Álvaro de Luna as Garfield Henchman
- Alfonso de la Vega as Garfield Henchman
- Simón Arriaga as Garfield Henchman
- Miguel del Castillo as Poker Player
- José Riesgo as Poker Player
- Xan das Bolas as Telegrafo
- Marisa Porcel as Gordita
- Emilio Rodríguez as Villager
- Antonio Moreno as Clemens
- Joaquín Parra as Garfield Henchman
- Guillermo Méndez as Pedro
- Rafael Albaicín as Jose
- Nazzareno Natale as Mexicano
