= Awkward Hands =

1970 film

- Spanish: Manos torpes
- Directed by: Rafael Romero Marchent
- Screenplay by: Santiago Moncada; Joaquín Romero Hernández
- Story by: Santiago Moncada; Joaquín Romero Hernández
- Produced by: Ricardo Sanz
- Cinematography: Miguel Fernández Mila
- Edited by: Antonio Gimeno
- Music by: Antón García Abril
- Production companies: Aitor Films; Emat Cinematografica
- Distributed by: Ízaro Films
- Release date: 18 May 1970 (Madrid)
- Running time: 93 min
- Country: Spain

Awkward Hands (Spanish: Manos torpes) is a 1970 Spanish western film directed by Rafael Romero Marchent, written by Santiago Moncada and Joaquín Romero Hernández, and starring Peter Lee Lawrence, Alberto de Mendoza and Pilar Velázquez.

== Cast ==
- Peter Lee Lawrence as Peter Cushmich
- Alberto de Mendoza as Latimore
- Pilar Velázquez as Dorothy
- Antonio Casas as Warren
- Manuel de Blas as Johnny
- Antonio Pica as Ted
- Luis Induni as Charly
- Antonio Molino Rojo as Frank
- Aldo Sambrell as Torturers
- Frank Braña as Chief of torturers
- Lorenzo Robledo
- Vidal Molina as Pistolero
- Joaquín Parra
- Saturno Cerra
- Beni Deus as Dueño Saloon
- Dina Loy
- Gene Reyes
- Yelena Samarina as Sra. Warren
- Josefina Serratosa
- Alfredo Ulecia
- Enrique Vázquez
- Mario Filippo
