= Raise Your Hands, Dead Man, You're Under Arrest =

1971 film directed by León Klimovsky

- Italian: Su le mani, cadavere! Sei in arresto
- Directed by: León Klimovsky
- Screenplay by: Enrico Zuccarini; José Luis Navarro; Sergio Bergonzelli
- Story by: Enrico Zuccarini; Jesus Maria Elorietta
- Produced by: Sergio Bergonzelli; Espartaco Santoni
- Cinematography: Tonino Maccoppi
- Edited by: Juan Pison; José Antonino Rojo
- Music by: Alessandro Alessandroni
- Production companies: Dauro Films; Sara Film
- Distributed by: Columbus; Divisa Home Video; Intercontinental Home Entertainment; Video Screen
- Release date: 17 December 1971
- Running time: 94 min
- Countries: Italy; Spain

Raise Your Hands, Dead Man, You're Under Arrest is a 1971 Italian-Spanish western film directed by Sergio Bergonzelli but credited to León Klimovsky for contractual reasons, produced by Sergio Bergonzelli, scored by Alessandro Alessandroni, and starring Peter Lee Lawrence as Sando Kid, Helga Liné, Espartaco Santoni, and José Canalejas.

It was shot in Almería.

== Cast ==
- Espartaco Santoni as Dollar
- Peter Lee Lawrence as Sando Kid
- Aldo Sambrell as Lee Grayton
- Helga Liné as Maybelle
- Tomás Blanco as Mr. Carson
- Mary Zan as Leonor Carson
- José Canalejas as Angel, Grayton's Henchman in Black
- Lorenzo Robledo as Ballor
- Simón Arriaga as Grayton's Henchman
- Antonio Cintado as Springfield Sheriff
- Rafael Corés as Porter, Springfield Banker
- Luis Barboo as J. Mac
- Alfonso de la Vega as Ranger Captain
- Franco Agostini as Brother Bamba
- Giovanni Santoponte as Sheriff
- Rafael de la Rosa
- Aurora de Alba as Mrs. Elizabeth Carson
- Ramón Fernández Tejela
- Joaquín Parra as Mr. Burton
