= One by One (1968 film) =

1968 film

- Directed by: Rafael Romero Marchent
- Screenplay by: Marino Girolami; Odoardo Fiory; Tito Carpi
- Story by: Eduardo Manzanos Brochero
- Produced by: Eduardo Manzanos Brochero; Luigi Mondello; Roberto Santini
- Starring: Peter Lee Lawrence; Willian Bogart; Dianik Zurakowska
- Cinematography: Emilio Foriscot
- Edited by: Antonio Jimeno
- Music by: Elsio Mancuso
- Production companies: Nike Cinematografica; Coop. Copercines
- Release date: 1968
- Countries: Spain; Italy

One by One (Spanish: Uno a uno, sin piedad) is a 1968 western film directed by Rafael R. Marchent, scored by Elsio Mancuso and starring Peter Lee Lawrence, William Bogart, Dianik Zurakowska, Eduardo Fajardo, Cris Huerta and Sidney Chaplin.

== Cast ==
- Peter Lee Lawrence as Bill 'Chico' Grayson
- William Bogart as Joe 'El Chato' Charro
- Dianik Zurakowska as Dolly
- Eduardo Fajardo as Sheriff Lyman
- Monica Mills as Lupe
- Miguel del Castillo as Priest
- Lucio De Santis as Big Boss Blackie
- Aurora Battista as Dolly's Maid
- Manuel Tejada as Frogmouth
- Chris Huerta as Lonely Drunkard in Saloon
- Paco Sanz as Zebulon
- Adriano Domínguez
- Alfonso Rojas as Capt. Jack Hawkins / Mr. Stuart

== Release ==
One By One was first distributed in 1968. It was released in Spain in 1969 where it sold 927,481 tickets. It was also released as One Against One... No Mercy.

== See also ==
- List of Italian films of 1968
