= Giuseppe Rosati =

Italian polymath

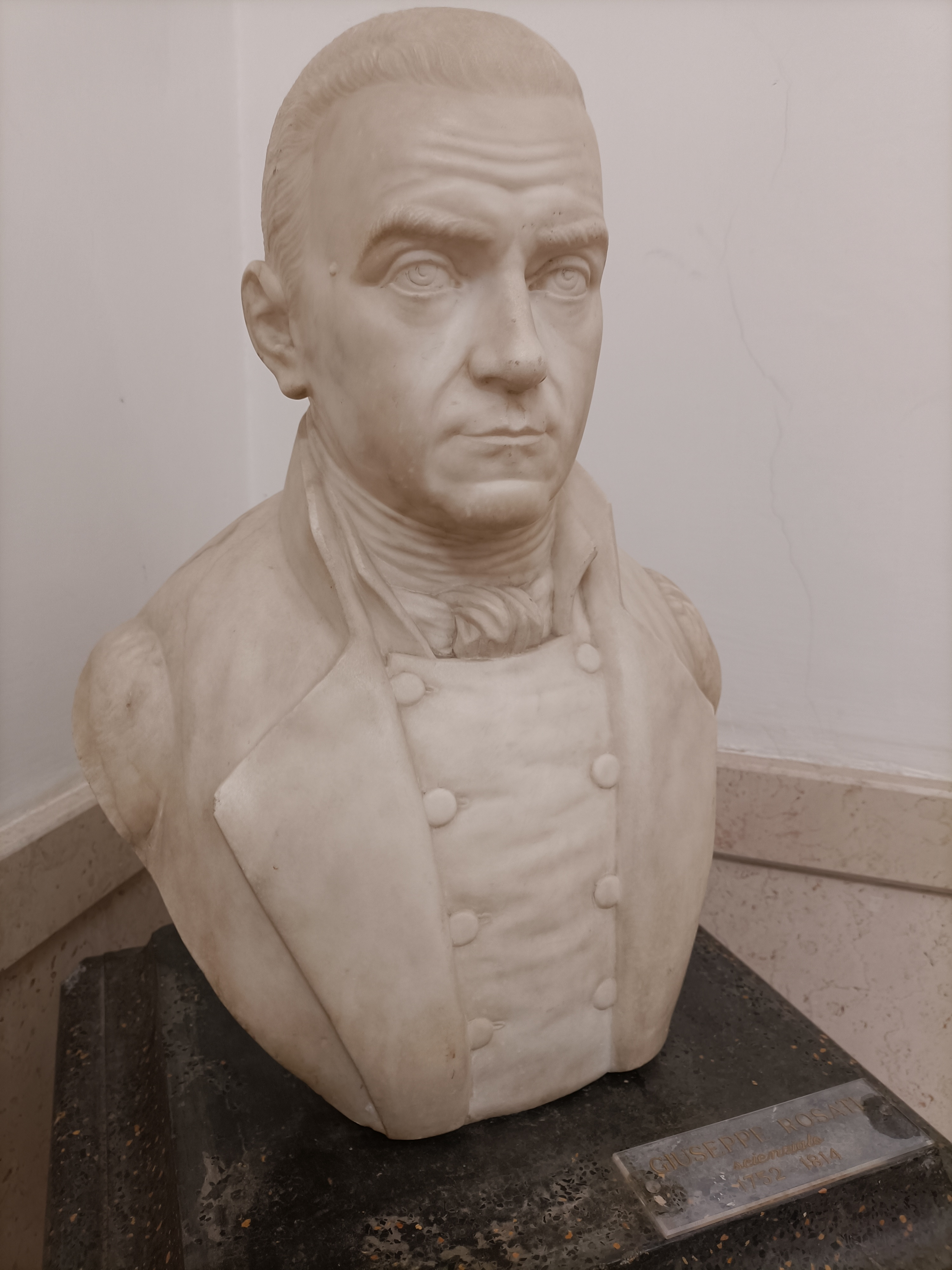
Bust of Giuseppe Rosati at the 'museo civico di Foggia'

Giuseppe Rosati (Foggia, 21 September 1752; Foggia, 1 September 1814) was an Italian physician, agronomist, philosopher and mathematician.

He was born in Foggia to Raffaele Rosati and Marianna Giannone. He attended the University of Medicine in Naples and, at the same time, he studied philosophy, agronomy and mathematics. In Naples, he started to write many works about agronomy, medicine, geography and mathematics. Upon returning to Foggia, he devoted himself to teaching the young and became the "doctor of the poor".

== Biography ==
He graduated in Medicine from the University of Naples Federico II, and at the same time studied and conducted research in various scientific disciplines such as mathematics, geography, architecture, and agronomy. Upon his return to Foggia in 1804, he was awarded a professorship in Agriculture, later Rural Economics, at the College of the Piarist Fathers, and in 1810 he became president of the Agricultural Society, later the Royal Economic Society of Capitanata di Foggia. Nicknamed the Newton of Puglia, he devoted his energies to the training and education of young people and wrote numerous works in various fields of his culture.

== Main works ==
- La geografia moderna, teoretica, istorica e pratica, Napoli, Raimondi, 1785
- Gli elementi dell’agrimensura teoretica e pratica, Napoli, Raimondi, 1787
- Discorso sull’agricoltura di Puglia 1792
- Elementi dell’aritmetica, Napoli, 1796
- Il metodo millenario, Foggia, 1803
- Elementi per l’edificazione, con 11 tavole, Napoli, Coda, 1805
- Le industrie di Puglia, con una carta geografica incisa dall’autore, Foggia, Variento, 1808
- Breviario dell’Historia sacra, Foggia, Russo, 1815
- Saggio storico sulla medicina, Foggia, Russo, 1826
- Geometria pratica. La piana, Napoli, Caggiano & C., 1832–33
