= Ringo the Lone Rider =

1968 Spaghetti Western film

- Film poster
- Directed by: Rafael Romero Marchent
- Screenplay by: Mario Caiano
- Story by: Eduardo M. Brochero
- Produced by: Eduardo Manzanos; Mario Caiano
- Cinematography: Emmanuele di Cola
- Edited by: Antonio Gimeno; Renato Cinquini
- Music by: Francesco De Masi; Manuel Parada
- Production companies: Copercines, Cooperativa Cinematográfica; Cinematografica EmmeCi
- Distributed by: Paradise Film Exchange; Koch Media; Hispamex Films; Isidoro Llorca Riera
- Release date: 1968
- Running time: 87 min

Ringo the Lone Rider (Spanish: Dos hombres van a morir, Italian: Ringo, il cavaliere solitario) is a 1968 Spanish-Italian Spaghetti Western film directed by Rafael Romero Marchent.

== Cast ==
- Peter Martell as Ringo
- Piero Lulli as Daniel G. Samuelson
- Armando Calvo as Bill Anderson
- Paolo Herzl as Michael aka 'Kid'
- José Jaspe as Zachary Hutchinson
- Jesús Puente as Mayor Gorbet
- Dianik as Lucy
- Giuseppe Fortis as Gonzalez
- Antonio Pica as Sheriff
- Ángel Menéndez as Judge Grant
- Francisco Braña as judge
- Guillermo Méndez as Anderson Henchman
- Alfonso Rojas as Stockwell, the miner
- Luis Barboo as Finnegan, a henchman
- Joaquín Burgos as Land Notary
- Alfonso de la Vega as Snake, a henchman
- Miguel del Castillo as rancher
- Pedro Fenollar as Thomas, the Springfield Barman
- Mario Morales as captured posse member
- Joaquín Parra as brawler
- Juan Antonio Peral as Anderson Henchman
- José Sepúlveda as Colorado Barman
- Jesús Tordesillas as Mormon Leader

== Releases ==
Wild East Productions released this on a limited edition DVD in 2008 alongside Eurospy film The Cobra, also starring Peter Martell.
