= Armando Calvo =

Puerto Rican actor (1919–1996)

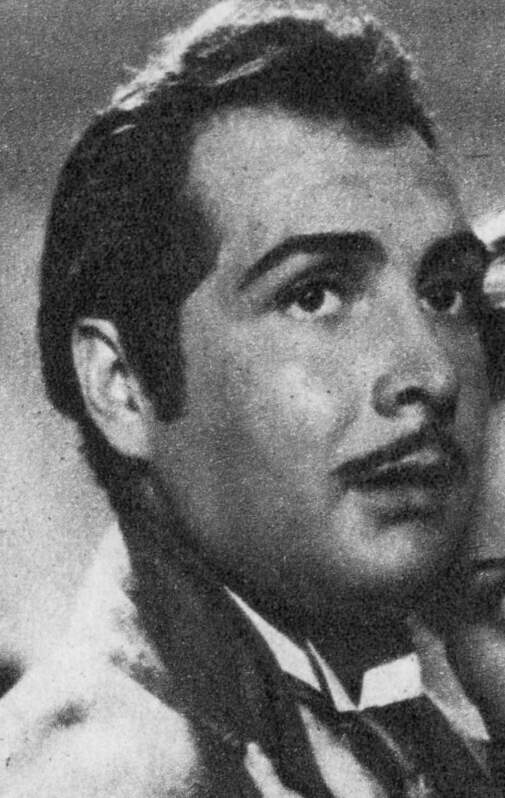
- Armando Calvo in 1948
- Born: 25 December 1919; San Juan, Puerto Rico
- Died: 6 July 1996 (aged 76); Mexico City, Mexico
- Occupation: Actor
- Years active: 1939–1996

Armando Calvo (25 December 1919 – 6 July 1996) was a Puerto Rican actor. His father was Juan Calvo Domenech, a Spanish actor and his mother was Minerva Lespier, a Puerto Rican. Calvo worked in Spain, Italy, and Mexico appearing in ninety films between 1939 and 1984. By the end of his career, there were over a hundred film credits in his resume. He died in Mexico on 6 July 1996 from renal and digestive issues.

== Entertainment career ==
Calvo was born in San Juan to actors Minerva Lespier and Juan Calvo, who had met during an operetta held in the island. At two months, he was introduced to the public in a play held at Mayagüez. When he was seven months old, the same was done in a enactment of Lecciones de Buen Amor in Spain, where they continued touring. Calvo was one of two siblings. He was instructed by his mother, since the couple lacked the money to enrol their sons in a formal school. Despite this, Calvo would learn seven different languages. At the age of five, the family moved to Alicante, where Calvo formally began his acting career. By the age of 12, he had become one of the best paid young actors in Madrid. Calvo joined the Infant Isabel initiative. Afterwards, he spent three seasons performing in classical theatre and began his involvement in cinema. He would frequent local cafés (one named after Puerto Rico) in search of opportunities. His debut took place in 1939's El Genio Alegre, along his father. The following year Calvo performed in Amore di Ussaro. In 1941, he appeared in Tierra y Cielo and L Ispecttore Vargas. The following year Calvo appeared in Correo de Indias and Pedro Alarcón's award-winning Goyescas. Calvo's performance in 1943's El Escándalo heightened his acting profile, and was responsible for him being cast for La Mujer de Todos.

Calvo's performance in 1945's Los Últimos de Filipinas earned him the Best Actor award from the Círculo de Escritores Cinematográficos. He next appeared in Bel Ami (1947), which went on to win three Ariel awards. During this time, Calvo also appeared in La Dama del Velo. Calvo starred in 1952's Doña Francisquita, which won the grand prize at the Cannes Film Festival. Five years later, he reappeared in El último cuplé. Calvo received the Fotogramas de Plata "Best Actor" award for his performance in La Muralla (1958). The following year, he was critical of the state of Spanish cinema, noting prevalent individuals and commercialization.

Calvo debuted in Hollywood in 1962's Call me Bad. Calvo also appeared in a number of spaghetti westerns, including 1963's Il Segno di Zorro and 1965's Una Bara per lo sceriffo. Other Italian projects included Criminal (1966), Grande notte di Ringo, La italian (1967), Agente Sigma 3: Missione Goldwather (1967).<ef name="Rivera39"/> He returned to Hollywood in 1968's The Witch's Mirror. In 1979, Calvo appeared in the Hollywood film Guyana: Cult of the Damned.

During the second half of the 1980s and into the mid 1990s, Calvo participated in telenovelasRosa Salvaje, Colorina, Monte Calvario and Marimar. Parallel to this he appeared in theatre, where he won the "Best Actor" award in Mexico for his performance in Crónica de una suegra in 1987.

== Personal life ==
Calvo was married twice and had nine children with his wife Ursula. Besides acting, Calvo had an interest in poesy. In 1989, Calvo published a book titled Para ti, futuro actor. Calvo was involved in the founding of Televicentro (WAPA-TV) along the main partners (Jorge Negrette, Arturo de Córdova). Calvo was involved in founding the Asociación Nacional de Actores de México and its subsequent separation from the Sindicato de Trabajadores de la Industria Mexicana and it joining STPC. Calvo died of a heart attack on July 6, 1996.

== Selected filmography ==
- El genio alegre (1939) - Antoñito
- Amore di ussaro (1940) - Carlos
- L'ispettore Vargas (1940)
- Tierra y cielo (1941) - Juan Ernesto Florín
- Goyescas (1942) - Luis Alfonso de Nuévalos
- Correo de Indias (1942) - Virrey del Perú
- The Scandal (1943) - Fabián Conde
- Life Begins at Midnight (1944) - Ricardo
- El hombre que las enamora (1944) - Eduardo
- Espronceda (1945) - José de Espronceda
- Last Stand in the Philippines (1945) - Teniente Martín Cerezo
- Everybody's Woman (1946) - Capitán Jorge Serralde
- Bel Ami (1947) - Jorge Duroy
- Encadenada (El yugo) (1947) - Enrique
- Ángel o demonio (1947) - Gabriel Araiza
- La mujer del otro (1948)
- La casa de la Troya (1948) - Gerardo Roquer
- La vorágine (1949)
- The Lady of the Veil (1949) - Esteban Navarro
- La venenosa (1949) - Luis de Sevilla
- Piña madura (1950) - Leonardo Pérez
- Doctor on Call (1950) - El Director de Hospital (Dr. Enrique Méndez)
- My Husband (1951) - Gustavo Duarte y Luque
- Among Lawyers I See You (1951) - El Abogangster
- Monte de piedad (1951) - Don Mario de Córdova
- Lodo y armiño (1951)
- Acapulco (1952) - Ricardo Serrano
- My Adorable Savage (1952)
- El ruiseñor del barrio (1952) - German Ricardi
- Doña Francisquita (1952) - Fernando
- Caribbean (1953)
- The Unfaithful (1953) - Rafael
- ¡Lo que no se puede perdonar! (1953) - Jorge del Río
- You Had To Be a Gypsy (1953) - Señor Calvo
- Romance de fieras (1954) - Ricardo Narváez
- La Calle de los amores (1954) - Arcadio Miranda
- Tu vida entre mis manos (1955) - Dr. Roberto Alonso
- El pueblo sin Dios (1955) - Padre Fernando
- Maternidad imposible (1955)
- La fuerza del deseo (1955) - Arturo
- El hombre que quiso ser pobre (1956) - Jorge Deval
- Ultraje al amor (1956) - Julio Soler
- Besos prohibidos (1956) - Dr. Daniel Solórzano
- Esposas infieles (1956)
- The Last Torch Song (1957) - Juan Contreras
- Call Me Bad (1957) - Dr. Luis Novoa
- Ama a tu prójimo (1958) - Doctor Ricardo Lugo
- La muralla (1958)
- La edad de la tentación (1959) - Ricardo Olivares, Padre
- Mi esposa me comprende (1959)
- Música de ayer (1959) - Carlos, Conde de San Telmo
- The Thieves (1959) - Joe Castagnato
- El amor que yo te di (1960) - Ricardo
- El hombre que perdió el tren (1960) - Maximino López
- Thaimí, la hija del pescador (1960) - Javier
- Orlak, el infierno de Frankenstein (1960) - Inspector Santos
- The Witch's Mirror (1962) - Eduardo Ramos
- Il segno di Zorro (1963) - Gen. Gutiérrez
- Bochorno (1963) - Don Luis
- A Coffin for the Sheriff (1965) - Lupe Rojo
- Ringo's Big Night (1966) - José the Mexican
- Ringo, the Mark of Vengeance (1966) - Fidel
- Kriminal (1966) - Kandur
- Django Does Not Forgive (1966)
- Agente Sigma 3 - Missione Goldwather (1967) - Karamesinis
- Two Crosses at Danger Pass (1967) - Old Moran
- Mister X (1967) - George Lamarro
- Killer Adios (1968) - Bill Bragg
- Ringo the Lone Rider (1968) - Bill Anderson
- Go for Broke (1968) - José Gomez
- Satanik (1968) - Commissioner Gonzalez
- Pistol for a Hundred Coffins (1968) - (uncredited)
- El taxi de los conflictos (1969) - El marido engañado
- Cry Chicago (1969) - Senador
- Sartana's Here… Trade Your Pistol for a Coffin (1970) - Hoagy (uncredited)
- Il corsaro (1970)
- La otra residencia (1970)
- The Doubt (1972) - Prior de Zaratay
- El caserío (1972) - Santi
- Corazón solitario (1973) - Gerardo
- El amor empieza a medianoche (1974) - Paco
- Proceso a Jesús (1974) - Espectador
- Cabaret Woman (1974)
- Sábado, chica, motel ¡qué lío aquel! (1976) - Ricardo
- Marcada por los hombres (1977) - Ramón
- Fango (1977) - Andrés
- Guyana: Crime of the Century (1979) - Reporter
- El oreja rajada (1980) - Juez
- El canto de la cigarra (1980) - José
- Ni Chana, ni Juana (1984) - Armando

== See also ==
- List of Puerto Ricans
