= Master Stroke =

1967 film

- Film poster
- Directed by: Michele Lupo
- Written by: Lewis E. Ciannelli; Sandro Continenza; Ettore Giannini; Roberto Gianviti
- Produced by: Edmondo Amati; Maurizio Amati
- Starring: Richard Harrison
- Cinematography: Francisco Sánchez
- Edited by: Antonietta Zita
- Music by: Francesco De Masi
- Release date: 1 June 1967
- Running time: 111 minutes
- Country: Italy
- Language: Italian

Master Stroke (Italian: Colpo maestro al servizio di Sua Maestà britannica) is a 1967 Italian crime film directed by Michele Lupo and starring Richard Harrison.

== Cast ==
- Richard Harrison - Arthur Lang
- Adolfo Celi - Mr. Bernard
- Margaret Lee - Evelyn
- Gérard Tichy - Max
- Antonio Casas - Col. Jenkins
- Eduardo Fajardo - Mr. Ferrick
- Andrea Bosic - Mr. Van Doren
- Livio Lorenzon - Miguel (as Charlie Lawrence)
- Ennio Balbo - Doctor
- Luciano Pigozzi - Billy (as Alan Collins)
- Mary Arden - Dorothy
- George Eastman
- Jacques Herlin - Goldsmith
- Tom Felleghy
