= Black Beauty (1971 film) =

1971 British film by James Hill

- North American film poster
- Directed by: James Hill
- Screenplay by: Wolf Mankowitz
- Additional dialogue by: James Hill
- Based on: Black Beauty by Anna Sewell
- Produced by: Peter L. Andrews; Malcolm B. Heyworth
- Starring: Mark Lester; Walter Slezak; Ursula Glas; Peter Lee Lawrence; John Nettleton; Patrick Mower; Maria Rohm
- Cinematography: Chris Menges
- Edited by: Ann Chegwidden
- Music by: Lionel Bart; John Cameron
- Production companies: Tigon British Film Productions; Chilton Film and Television Enterprises
- Distributed by: Tigon Pictures
- Release date: April 1971
- Running time: 106 minutes
- Country: United Kingdom
- Language: English

Black Beauty is a 1971 British drama film directed by James Hill and starring Walter Slezak, Mark Lester, Uschi Glas, Patrick Mower and John Nettleton. It was written by Wolf Mankowitz based on Anna Sewell's 1877 novel of the same name. It is the fourth feature film adaptation of Anna Sewell's story. Lionel Bart provided the score.

== Plot ==
Black Beauty is a stallion who, as a foal in England c. 1856, is born in front of a boy named Joe to whom it is given by his father. He is taken by a brutal squire, who takes over Joe's family farm when the bank forecloses on the loan. After the squire is killed, he is acquired by Irish Travellers. After a horse race and fist fight to determine leadership, Black Beauty runs away but is captured by a horse trader who then sells him to a Spanish circus.

In the circus, he learns many tricks before being given to Sir William, an arrogant British military man; and then is passed to Sir William's daughter Anne. Anne's fiancé is Lt. Gervaise Caldicott, a half French half English hussar officer whom Sir William falsely accuses of being a coward and unworthy of his daughter's hand. When Gervaise volunteers for overseas active military service to prove his bravery his fiancée gives him Black Beauty as his steed.

Black Beauty then travels to the Northwest Frontier, where Gervaise is killed in battle.

Because of his bravery in battle, the horse is shipped back to England, but is then sold by Gervaise's comrade in arms, now a penniless and alcoholic army officer. The horse is used for hauling coal by another heartless owner, but acquires pneumonia. At his most sick, he is rescued by a friendly old woman who runs a farm for retired horses and her employee, some time after 1870. The employee turns out to be the boy named Joe whom Black Beauty knew when he was a foal, while the woman was Anna Sewell (author of the original Black Beauty book).

== Cast ==
- Mark Lester as Joe Evans
- Walter Slezak as Hackenschmidt
- Uschi Glas as Marie Hackenschmidt (credited as Ursula Glas)
- Peter Lee Lawrence as Lt. Gervaise Caldicott
- Patrick Mower as Sam Greene
- John Nettleton as Sir William
- Maria Rohm as Lady Anne Piggott
- Eddie Golden as Evans, Joe's father
- Clive Geraghty as Roger
- John Hoey as Muldoon
- Patrick Gardiner as Seamus O'Flaherty
- Brian McGrath as Mark Beauchamp
- Ronan Smith as farmboy
- John Franklyn as coalman
- Margaret Lacey as Anna Sewell

== Filming ==
The film was shot over eight weeks on location in Ireland and Spain, four weeks each.

== Reception ==
The Monthly Film Bulletin wrote: "An appealing film, unfussily taking the switches from gypsy romance to circus comedy to frontier adventure in its animal-loving stride. Director James Hill plays the assorted episodes for all they are worth; and if the story appears a little thin at times – reflecting the simple-minded didacticism of Anna Sewell's original – it at least has the comparative advantage of not being told entirely from the equine viewpoint, while in the swirl of events there is little chance for its downtrodden hero (any of the five of him needed for different portions of the story) to steal the show. Even so, adults indifferent to animals may find the sentimental journey just a little hard to take."

Roger Ebert was overall complimentary of the film, and believed the re-telling of the book remained true to the original aims of the author, although changing the actual biography of the horse. According to Ebert, James Hill's version of Black Beauty is "more than just an animal movie." Ebert was also generally complimentary of the human actors, although he panned the performance of Mark Lester as Joe. He gave the film three out of four stars.

A review in The New York Times also commented on the major plot changes, but called the movie "uncommonly interesting, handsome and sometimes quite marvelously inventive". The review praised the atmosphere of the movie and the performances of several actors in secondary roles, but called the performances of Mark Lester and Walter Slezak "utterly pedestrian".

Variety felt that the "trouble" with the film was "obvious":

In their attempt to please all audiences, in too many different lands, the filmmakers had to ride off in all directions at once. If the heavies in the story hammed up their parts, they probably intended to suit the Spanish taste. Besides that bombast, an oversweet saccharin streak of German “heart and soul” oozes through the picture. Still another element, quite foreign to the original story, was unsuccessfully aimed at Yank preferences. To some extent, this charming horse saga emerges as a rough-riding Western.

== See also ==
- List of films about horses
