= Andrea Bosic =

Italian actor (1919–2012)

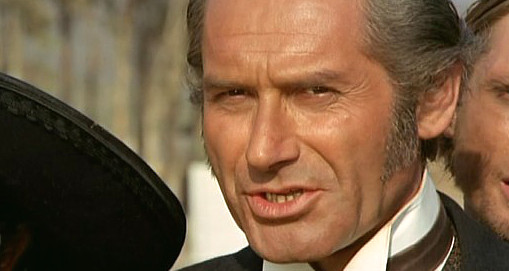
- Andrea Bosic in I Want Him Dead (1968)
- Born: Ignazio Andrej Božič; 15 August 1919; Gomilsko (Maribor), Kingdom of Serbs, Croats and Slovenes (today in Slovenia)
- Died: 8 January 2012 (aged 92); Bologna, Italy
- Occupation: Actor
- Years active: 1951–1985

Andrea Bosic (15 August 1919 – 8 January 2012) was an Italian film actor of Slovene origin. He appeared in more than 50 films between 1951 and 1985, mainly in films called Spaghetti Westerns. He has appeared in films alongside John Phillip Law, Giuliano Gemma, Lee Van Cleef and Ivan Rassimov. He was born as Ignazio Andrej Božič in Gomilško, now a suburb of Maribor, Slovenia.

== Partial filmography ==
- Appointment for Murder (1951) - Aldo Manni
- Two Nights with Cleopatra (1954) - Caio Malpurnio (uncredited)
- Ulysses (1954) - Agamemnon (uncredited)
- La cambiale (1959) - Prince Vasilij
- The Prisoner of the Iron Mask (1961)
- Sword of the Conqueror (1961) - King Cunimond
- Rômulo e Remo (1961) - Faustolo
- The Witch's Curse (1962) - Judge Parris
- Damon and Pythias (1962) - Arcanos
- Il sangue e la sfida (1962)
- Imperial Venus (1962) - Del Val
- The Verona Trial (1963) - Tullio Cianetti
- The Magnificent Adventurer (1963) - Michelangelo
- Sandokan the Great (1963) - Yanez
- The Avenger of Venice (1964)
- Temple of the White Elephant (1964) - Colonel
- Romeo and Juliet (1964) - Capulet
- Pirates of Malaysia (1964) - Yanez
- Genoveffa di Brabante (1964) - Duque di Brabante
- Adventures of the Bengal Lancers (1964) - Col. Lee McDonald
- Due mafiosi contro Goldginger (1965) - Col. Herrman
- Spies Strike Silently (1966) - Rashid
- El Greco (1966) - Prosecutor
- Arizona Colt (1966) - Pedro / Pete
- For a Few Extra Dollars (1966) - Colonel as Davis camp
- Kill or Be Killed (1966) - Lo sceriffo
- Kriminal (1966) - Ispettore Milton
- Master Stroke (1967) - Mr. Van Doren
- Argoman the Fantastic Superman (1967) - Admiral Durand
- Killer Caliber .32 (1967) - Averell
- I giorni della violenza (1967) - Mr. Evans
- Death Rides Along (1967) - Bryan Talbot
- 15 forche per un assassino (1967) - Andrew Ferguson, the Pastor
- Day of Anger (1967) - Abel Murray
- Two Faces of the Dollar (1967) - Col. Talbert
- Your Turn to Die (1967) - Diplomat
- Danger: Diabolik (1968) - Bank Manager
- Gunman Sent by God (1968) - Jonathan Murphy
- I Want Him Dead (1968) - Mallek
- Il marchio di Kriminal (1968) - Inspector Patrick Milton
- Rebu (1969) - Manager of Beirut Casino
- Death Knows No Time (1969)
- A Bullet for Rommel (1969) - Captain Agamemnon Geeves
- Hornets' Nest (1970) - Gen. Von Kleber
- The Tigers of Mompracem (1970) - Yanez
- They Call Me Hallelujah (1971) - Johannes Krantz
- Siamo tutti in libertà provvisoria (1971)
- Goodnight, Ladies and Gentlemen (1976) - Bishop of Naples (uncredited)
- The Greatest Battle (1978) - Mimmo Parnat
- Manhattan Baby (1982) - Optician
- Formula for a Murder (1985) - Father Peter
