= Cjamango =

1967 film

- Wild East DVD Cover
- Directed by: Edoardo Mulargia
- Written by: Vincenzo Musolino
- Produced by: Vincenzo Musolino
- Starring: Ivan Rassimov (as Sean Todd)
- Cinematography: Vitaliano Natalucci
- Edited by: Enzo Alabiso
- Music by: Felice Di Stefano
- Release date: 1967
- Running time: 90 minutes
- Country: Italy
- Language: Italian

Cjamango is a 1967 Italian Spaghetti Western starring Ivan Rassimov billed as Sean Todd. The film was officially released in Germany as Django Kreuze im Blutigen Sand, as another unofficial sequel to the 1966 film Django. The film May God Forgive You... But I Won't (1968) features George Ardisson as Cjamango McDonald.

== Plot ==
After winning gold in a poker game, Cjamango only has it stolen by his partners. Cjamango sets out for revenge.

== Cast ==
- Sean Todd: Cjamango
- Hélène Chanel: Perla Hernandez
- Mickey Hargitay: Clinton
- Livio Lorenzon: Don Pablo
- Piero Lulli: El Tigre
- Giusva Fioravanti: Manuel Hernandez
- Ignazio Spalla: Mexikanischer Spieler
- Gino Buzzanca: Hernandez

== Releases ==
Wild East released the film on a limited edition Region 1 DVD in 2007.
