= God Made Them... I Kill Them =

1968 film

- Directed by: Paolo Bianchini
- Written by: Fernando Di Leo
- Produced by: Cineriz
- Starring: Dean Reed; Peter Martell
- Cinematography: Sergio D'Offizi
- Music by: Marcello Gigante
- Release date: 1968
- Country: Italy
- Language: Italian

God Made Them... I Kill Them (Italian: Dio li crea... Io li ammazzo!, also known as God Forgives: His Life Is Mine) is a 1968 Italian Spaghetti Western film written by Fernando Di Leo and directed by Paolo Bianchini.

== Cast ==
- Dean Reed as Slim Corbett
- Peter Martell as Don Luis / Rod Douglas
- Piero Lulli as Sheriff Lancaster
- Agnès Spaak as Dolores
- Linda Veras as Suzanne
- Rossella Bergamonti as Dolly
- Ivano Staccioli as Judge Kincaid
- Fidel Gonzáles as Job
- Piero Mazzinghi as Major Toland
- Bruno Ariè as Dark
- Giuseppe Alizeri as Cobb
