= Day of Violence =

1967 film by Alfonso Brescia

- Italian: I giorni della violenza
- Directed by: Al Bradley
- Screenplay by: Mario Amendola; Antonio Boccaci; Gian Luigi Buzzi; Paolo Lombardo
- Story by: Gian Luigi Buzzi
- Produced by: Bruno Turchetto
- Starring: Beba Loncar; Luigi Vannucchi; Andrea Bosic; Lucio Rosato; Nello Pazzafini; Rosalba Neri
- Cinematography: Fausto Rossi
- Edited by: Antonietta Zita
- Music by: Bruno Nicolai
- Production company: Concord Film
- Distributed by: Constantin Film; Koch Media; Lighthouse Home Entertainment; 'Sein Wechselgeld ist Blei'; Loving the Classics
- Release date: 10 August 1967 (Italy)
- Running time: 105 min
- Country: Italy

Day of Violence (Italian: I giorni della violenza) is a 1967 Italian western film directed by Al Bradley, written by Mario Amendola, Antonio Boccaci, Gian Luigi Buzzi and Paolo Lombardo, and starring Peter Lee Lawrence, Rosalba Neri, Andrea Bosic and Harold Bradley.

== Synopsis ==
During the Civil War in Missouri, a young man named Johs Lee witnesses his brother and sister-in-law's murder, carried out by Northern captain Clifford and his accomplice Hank Stone. Clifford, driven by jealousy, kills his rival, while Stone murders his lover for rejecting him. To seek vengeance, Lee abandons his wife Christine and his stepfather's ranch to join Southern rebels. Meanwhile, Christine, influenced by her father's grief and Clifford's outlaw status, marries Clifford to keep their ranch. Enraged, Lee kidnaps Christine, his former wife, and flees, pursued by Clifford, his men, and Stone, planning his revenge.

== Cast ==
- Peter Lee Lawrence as Johs Lee
- Beba Loncar as Christine Evans
- Luigi Vannucchi as Capt. Dan Clifford
- Andrea Bosic as Mr. Evans
- Nello Pazzafini as Butch
- Lucio Rosato as Hank Stone
- Rosalba Neri as Lizzy
- Gianni Solaro as Man from Boston
- Romano Puppo as Clell
- Adalberto Rossetti
- Bruna Beani
- Claudio Trionfi
- Gloria Selva as Jenny
- Harold Bradley as Nathan
- Bruno Ariè as Soldier Shot on Coach
- Arnaldo Dell'Acqua as Soldier
- Lina Franchi as Saloon Girl
- Gilberto Galimberti as Butch Henchman
- Riccardo Petrazzi as Soldier
- Renzo Pevarello as Soldier
- Claudio Ruffini as Butch Henchman
- Bruno Ukmar as Sergeant
- Rinaldo Zamperla as Soldier
