= Cristina Galbó =

Spanish actress

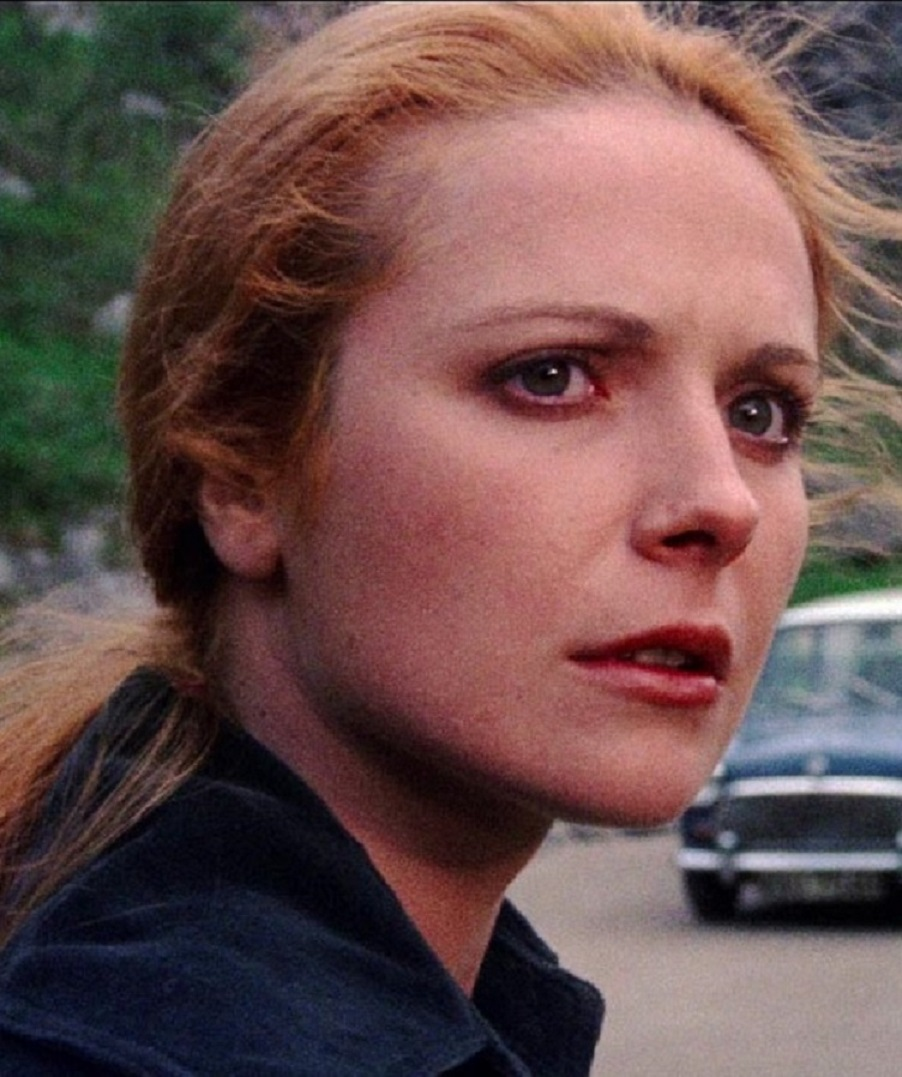
- Cristina Galbó in Let Sleeping Corpses Lie (1974)
- Born: Cristina Galbó Sánchez; 17 January 1950 (age 75); Madrid, Spain
- Spouse: Peter Lee Lawrence (1969-1974)
- Children: David Hyrenbach
- Relatives: Beatriz Galbó (sister)

Cristina Galbó Sánchez (born 17 January 1950) is a Spanish actress who achieved moderate fame in Europe during the late 1960s and early 1970s, making a name for herself in film mostly for European horror films.

She started her career with a young age in the film Aquella joven de blanco in a leading role, which is about Bernadette Soubirous. In 1963 she appeared in Del rosa al amarillo, directed by Manuel Summers, who also directed Suéltate el pelo, about Hombres G, where she also had a role (Manuel Summers married her sister Beatriz Galbó and got a daughter named Cheyenne). She also appeared in Los chicos del Preu, she played the couple of Palomo Linares in Nuevo en esta plaza, and a lover of Joan Manuel Serrat in Palabras de amor.

In 1967 she appeared in Dove si spara di più, a spaghetti western directed by Gianni Puccini and starring Peter Lee Lawrence, with whom she married two years later in 1969. They moved to Rome and got a child named David Hyrenbach.

Arguably her best-known role is as "Elizabeth Seccles", a boarding school girl having an affair with a married professor of Italian and gymnastics, in the 1972 Massimo Dallamano giallo, What Have You Done to Solange? A recent DVD release of her 1975 film The Killer Must Kill Again, the most notable work of Luigi Cozzi (a friend and associate of giallo film master Dario Argento) has presented her controversial work in that more obscure representative of the Italian horror genre.

Cozzi mentions on his DVD commentary for the film how Galbó was uncomfortable with the film's most disturbing scene, the killer's rape of her kidnapped and abused character. Galbó also has a significant role in another boarding school shocker, Narciso Ibáñez Serrador's 1969 Spanish film The House That Screamed, and in Cosa avete fatto a Solange? (1972).

Peter Lee Lawrence died in 1974, and in 1988 she retired. She moved to California and opened a flamenco dancing academy, where she is working until today.

== Filmography ==
Year	Title	Role	Notes
1966	La ciudad no es para mí	Sara	
1969	Blood in the Bullring	Paloma Domínguez	
1969	Shoot Twice	Saloon Singer	Credited as Cristina Galbo; also known as Twice a Judas
1969	The House That Screamed	Teresa Garan	Also known as The Finishing School
1972	What Have You Done to Solange?	Elizabeth Seccles	
1974	Let Sleeping Corpses Lie	Edna Simmonds	Also known as The Living Dead at Manchester Morgue and Don't Open the Window
1975	The Killer Must Kill Again	Laura	Also known as The Dark Is Death's Friend
1975	Forget the Drums	Pili	
