= All on the Red =

- Directed by: Aldo Florio
- Written by: Aldo Florio; Mario Guerra; Vittorio Vighi
- Starring: Brett Halsey
- Cinematography: Guglielmo Mancori
- Music by: Franco Salina
- Release date: 1968
- Country: Italy
- Language: Italian

All on the Red (Italian: Tutto sul rosso) is a 1968 Italian crime-thriller film written and directed by Aldo Florio and starring Brett Halsey.

== Cast ==
- Brett Halsey as Mike Chapman
- Barbara Zimmermann as Belinda Duval
- Piero Lulli as Laszlo
- José Greci as Yvette
- Gordon Mitchell as Erikson
- Franco Ressel as Reikovic
- Vladimir Bacic as Tankovic
- Antonio Nalis as Mark
- Giovanni Ivan Scratuglia as Tacci
- Gianni Solaro as Marello
