= Killer Caliber .32 =

1967 film

- Directed by: Alfonso Brescia
- Written by: Vincenzo Gicca Palli
- Starring: Peter Lee Lawrence; Agnès Spaak
- Cinematography: Fulvio Testi
- Edited by: Edmondo Lozzi
- Music by: Robby Poitevin
- Release date: 1967
- Language: Italian

Killer Caliber .32 (Italian: Killer calibro 32, also known as 32 Caliber Killer) is a 1967 Italian Spaghetti Western film written and directed by Alfonso Brescia and starring Peter Lee Lawrence.

== Plot ==
Silver kills the seven members of a masked gang, one by one. Saloon girls and poker games enliven this action-packed movie which culminates in the unmasking of the evil gang's boss.

== Cast ==
- Peter Lee Lawrence as Silver
- Agnès Spaak as Beth
- Hélène Chanel as Doll
- Andrea Bosic as Averell
- Mirko Ellis as Sheriff Bear
- John Bartha as Parker
- Silvio Bagolini as Old Man
- Michael Bolt as Carruthers
- Alberto Dell'Acqua as Spot Averell
- Massimo Righi as Jud
- Nello Pazzafini as Fitch

== See also ==
- List of Italian films of 1967
