= Fury of Johnny Kid =

1967 Italian-Spanish film directed by Gianni Puccini

- Directed by: Gianni Puccini
- Written by: Maria del Carmen; Martinez Roman; Bruno Baratti
- Produced by: Francesco Merli
- Starring: Peter Lee Lawrence; Cristina Galbo; Andres Mejuto; Piero Lulli; Pietro Martellanza; Paul Naschy (uncredited)
- Cinematography: Mario Montuori
- Edited by: Rosa Salgado; Amadeo Giomini
- Music by: Gino Peguri
- Distributed by: Variety Distribution
- Release dates: March 2, 1967 (Italy); July 1969 (Spain)
- Country: Spain/ Italy

Fury of Johnny Kid (Italian: Dove si spara di più, Spanish: La furia de Johnny Kidd, also known as Ultimate Gunfighter) is a 1967 Italian-Spanish film directed by Gianni Puccini. The Italian and Spanish versions of the film have different endings. The film is a Spaghetti Western version of William Shakespeare's tragedy Romeo and Juliet. Paul Naschy worked as an assistant director on this film, and Director Puccini told him he wanted to bring Naschy back to Rome to work with him on other projects. Puccini died in Rome in December 1968, so it was not to be.

== Plot ==
Two family clans have always been enemies; they spend their time hating and killing each other. The daughter of the Campos family and the son of the Mounter family fall in love, thus causing further hatred and deaths.

== Cast ==
- Peter Lee Lawrence: Johnny Monter (credited as Arthur Grant)
- Cristina Galbó: Jiulieta Campos
- María Cuadra: Rosalind
- Andrés Mejuto: Lefty
- Piero Lulli: Sheriff
- Peter Martell: Lodorigo Campos
- Luis Induni: Father Monter
- Ana María Noé: Mother Monter
- Ángel Álvarez: Padre
- Pepe Rubio: Jack (credited as José Rubio)
- Luciano Catenacci: Campos henchman
- Paul Naschy as pistolero in saloon
