= Hell in Normandy =

- Italian film poster
- Directed by: Alfonso Brescia
- Written by: Maurice De Vries; Lorenzo Gicca Palli
- Screenplay by: Maurice De Vries; Lorenzo Gicca Palli
- Starring: Guy Madison; Peter Lee Lawrence; Erika Blanc
- Cinematography: Fausto Rossi
- Edited by: Renato Cinquini
- Music by: Giorgio Fabor; Italo Fischetti
- Distributed by: Mogul Communications
- Release date: August 13, 1968 (Italy)
- Running time: 90 min
- Countries: Italy; France
- Languages: French; Italian

Hell in Normandy (Italian title: Testa di sbarco per otto implacabili, French title: Tête de pont pour huit implacables) is a 1968 French/Italian international co-production Euro War film set during World War II and directed by Alfonso Brescia.

== Plot ==
Prior to the invasion of France, Allied Intelligence launches Operation GAMBIT, the destruction of a bunker containing the controls to a device to flood the waters off the American landing at Omaha Beach with oil and ignite it to destroy the landing craft.

The first phase is a preliminary reconnaissance by a contingent of the French Resistance led by a woman codenamed Denise (Erika Blanc). The second phase is infiltration of the bunker by a team of three Allied commandoes impersonating two German officers that includes the inventor of the process and their driver who have been scheduled to visit the installation that have been intercepted and assassinated by the Resistance. The team, led by Lt. Strobel (Peter Lee Lawrence) is to locate the mechanism for the process and relay that information to England. Phase three is an American parachute attack on the installation on the night prior to D-Day led by Captain Murphy (Guy Madison).

Leading his strike force in rehearsals for the raid, Captain Murphy is growing more disillusioned about the scheme due to what he feels is Allied Intelligence giving the surprise away due to the continued reconnaissance. Murphy also feels the code name "gambit", a chess term for the sacrifice of a pawn, is meant to apply to his command.

Phase two is initially successful until the bodies of the Germans the Allied infiltrators are impersonating are discovered by German detector dogs. Only Lt. Strobel is able to escape to the safety of Denise and her father, an old man tired and frightened of war.

Captain Murphy's strike force flies to France on the night of June 4, with the first of the invasion force but after Murphy and nine of his men parachute into France the mission is suddenly aborted due to bad weather; the rest of Murphy's unit returns to England leaving Murphy and his men on their own.

Denise, Strobel and Murphy and his small group pool their resources at Denise's father's farm for what they feel is a suicide mission.

== Cast ==
- Guy Madison: Captain Jack Murphy
- Peter Lee Lawrence: Lt. Strobel
- Erika Blanc: Denise
- Philippe Hersent: Professor Aubernet
- Massimo Carocci: Captain Ryan
- George F. Salvage (as G.F. Savage)
- Pierre Richard: Sergeant Doss
- Antonio Monselesan (as Tony Norton)
- Max Turilli: Feldwebel Siedler
- Giuseppe Castellano (as G. Castellano)
- Renato Pinciroli: Denise's father (as R. Pinciroli)
- Luciano Lorcas
- Paolo Magalotti
- Guido Di Salvo
- Gianni Pulone
- Giovanni Ivan Scratuglia: Navy officer (as Ivan Scratuglia)
- Giuseppe Terranova
- Sergio Testori
- R. Mantovani
- John Bartha: Ted Bancroft - American General (uncredited)
- William Conroy: German Soldier (uncredited)
- Tom Felleghy: Colonel Voller (uncredited)
- Renato Pugluai: (uncredited)
- Michele Titov: (uncredited)
- Bill Vanders: David - American Officer (uncredited)
