= Eduardo Fajardo =

Spanish actor (1924–2019)

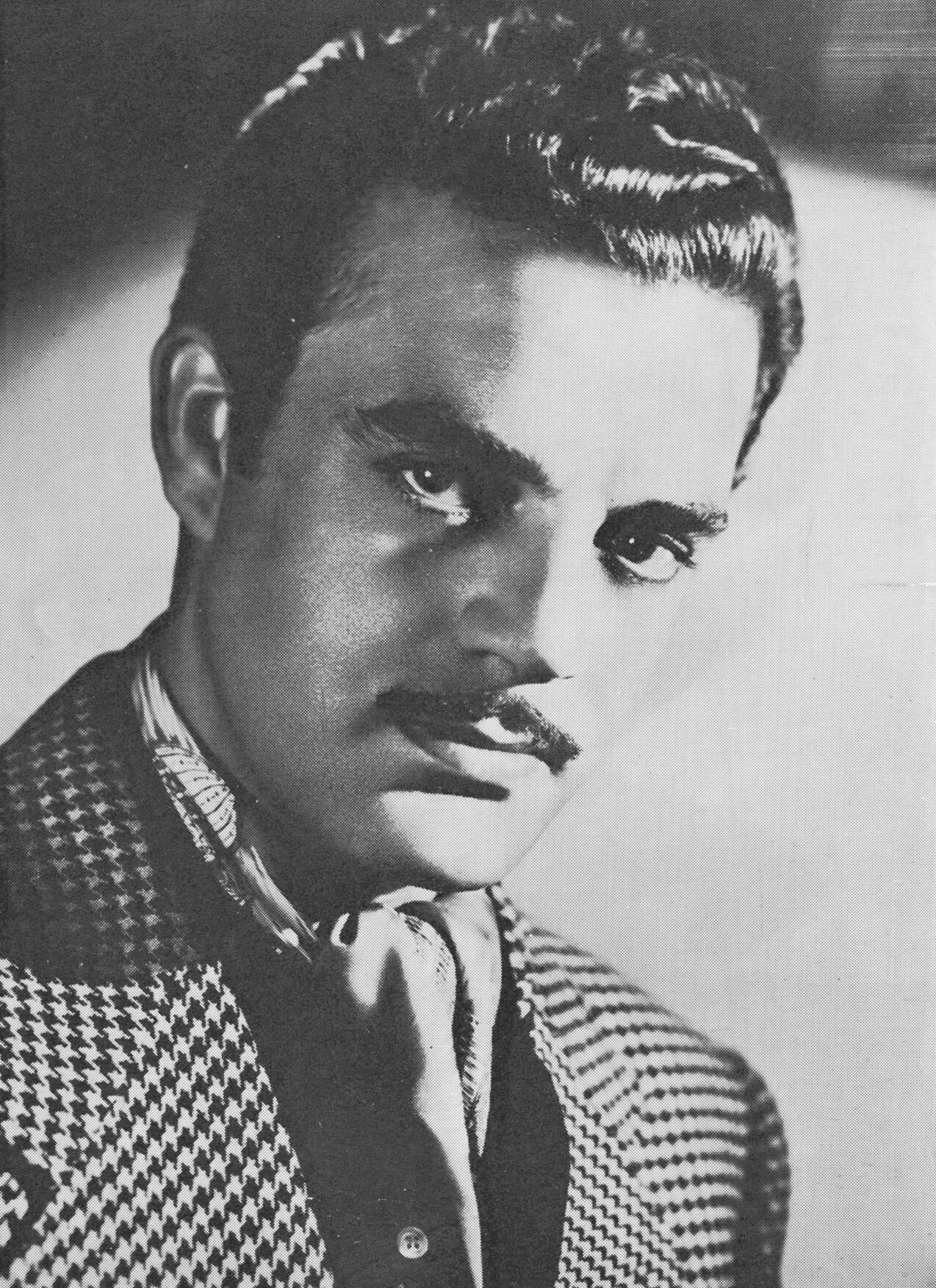
- Fajardo in 1954
- Born: Eduardo Martínez Fajardo; 14 August 1924; Meis, Pontevedra, Spain
- Died: 4 July 2019 (aged 94); Mexico City, Mexico
- Occupation: Actor
- Years active: 1947–2002
- Spouse: Carmelita González
- Children: 7

Eduardo Martínez Fajardo (14 August 1924 – 4 July 2019) was a Spanish actor. He was known to international audiences for his roles in Spaghetti Western films, including Django (1966), The Mercenary (1968), Long Live Your Death (1971), Sting of the West (1972), Sonny and Jed (1972) and What Am I Doing in the Middle of a Revolution? (1972); often directed by Sergio Corbucci. A long-time resident of Mexico, he also had noted supporting roles in the award-winning films Tizoc (1957) and Ánimas Trujano (1962).

== Life and career ==
Fajardo was born in Meis, Pontevedra on 14 August 1924, and raised in Haro and Santander, where he studied Bachillerato.

He entered the film industry as a Castilian Spanish-language dubber in 1942. He re-voiced Orson Welles in Othello (1951), as well as John Wayne and Clark Gable. He made his live-action film debut in the 1947 film Héroes del 95, directed by Raúl Alfonso.

In 1953, Fajardo moved to Mexico, largely for political reasons (members of his family were Republican sympathizers), where he would live full-time until 1973. His arrival coincided with the Golden Age of Mexican cinema and he appeared in many Mexican films. He worked with Ismael Rodríguez several times, including the internationally-acclaimed Tizoc (1957) and Ánimas Trujano (1962).

His return to European cinema saw him become a regular actor of Italian spaghetti westerns and their Spanish domestic equivalent, the paella western, typically as villains. One of his best-known Western roles was as KKK leader Major Jackson in Django (1966). He collaborated with Django director Sergio Corbucci in many subsequent films. In 1972, he won the Best Actor Prize of the Spanish National Syndicate of Spectacle for his performance in the horror film La mansión de la niebla (English: "The Murder Mansion").

== Awards and honours ==
His close relationship with Almería saw him receive the inaugural star on the Almeria Walk of Fame on 11 April 2012, and several civic honours including the Provincial Culture Medal and the Almería Land of Cinema award. In 2010, he was named hijo predilecto ("Favorite Son") of his hometown of Meis. In January 2019, he was honored by the Almería Western Museo del Cine.

He was awarded the "Ignacio Comonfort" Medal by the Mexican government for helping strengthen cultural ties between Spain and Mexico.

== Personal life ==
From 1994 until his death, Fajardo resided in Almería, where many of his Spaghetti Westerns were filmed. He was married four times. In Mexico he married twice, once with the actress Carmelita González, with whom he had a daughter, Paloma del Rocío. His others children are José Antonio, Corazón, Lucero, Dusko, Alma and Eduardo.

In 2002, he founded Teatro sin barreras in Almeria, in order to help people with disabilities.

=== Death ===
Fajardo died while visiting Mexico City with five of his seven children on 4 July 2019, at the age of 94.

== Selected filmography ==
- Héroes del 95 (1947) – Enrique de Mendoza
- Dulcinea (1947) – Ginés de la Hera
- La nao Capitana (1947) – Soldier (uncredited)
- Lady in Ermine (1947) – Don Luis Tristán
- The Princess of the Ursines (1947) – Capitán emisario
- Fuenteovejuna (1947) – Soldado
- 2 cuentos para 2 (1947) – Franklin Perry
- Don Quijote de la Mancha (1947) – Don Fernando
- Amanhã Como Hoje (1948) – Capitão
- Madness for Love (1948) – Marqués de Villena
- Mare Nostrum (1948) – Capitán
- The Captain from Loyola (1949)
- Currito de la Cruz (1949) – Man at bullring (uncredited)
- Noche de Reyes (1949)
- Just Any Woman (1949) – Ricardo
- The Duchess of Benameji (1949) – Carlos, Marqués de Miraflores
- ¡El santuario no se rinde! (1949) – Teniente Ramos
- Paz (1949) – Voz en radio (voice, uncredited)
- El sótano (1949) – Juan Bell
- Tempest (1949) – Coronel Puig Moltó
- Tormented Soul (1950)
- Woman to Woman (1950) – Luis
- Agustina of Aragon (1950) – Luis Montana
- Tres ladrones en la casa (1950) – Felipe
- Reckless (1951) – Mario Santos
- The Lioness of Castille (1951) – Tovar
- Dawn of America (1951) – Gastón
- Cerca de la ciudad (1952) – Antonio
- Gloria Mairena (1952) – Paulino Céspedes
- The Curious Impertinent (1953) – Bocaccio
- Airport (1953) – Espectador (uncredited)
- La intrusa (1954) – Raúl Gómez de Fonseca
- Tehuantepec (1954)
- La engañadora (1955)
- Orgullo de mujer (1956) – Ramón Durán
- Tizoc (1957) – Arturo
- La ciudad de los niños (1957) – Señor Jaime Andrade
- Las últimas banderas (1957)
- Escuela de rateros (1958) – Eduardo, ladrón de joyas
- Macario (1960) – Virrey
- La Llorona (1960) – Don Nuño de Montes Claros
- Ánimas Trujano (1961) – El Español
- Los invisibles (1963) – Jewel Thief
- Las hijas del Zorro (1964)
- Canción del alma (1964) – Alejandro
- Las invencibles (1964)
- I due toreri (1965) – Ispettore N.B.
- Vengeance of the Vikings (1965) – Olaf
- Heroes of Fort Worth (1965) – Col. George Bonnet
- A Coffin for the Sheriff (1965) – Russell Murdock
- Ringo's Big Night (1966) – Joseph Finley
- La ciudad no es para mí (1966) – Dr. Agustín Valverde hijo
- Django (1966) – Major Jackson
- Agent 3S3: Massacre in the Sun (1966) – Professor Theodore Karleston
- Pas de panique (1966) – Lorenzaccio
- Missione apocalisse (1966) – Axel
- Ringo, the Mark of Vengeance (1966) – Tim
- Trap for Seven Spies (1966) – Colonnello Riteau
- El aventurero de Guaynas (1966)
- Master Stroke (1967) – Mr. Ferrington
- Argoman the Fantastic Superman (1967) – Shandra, butler
- Seven Pistols for a Massacre (1967) – Tilly
- Come rubare un quintale di diamanti in Russia (1967) – Gen. Poniatowski
- Il tempo degli avvoltoi (1967) – Don Jaime Mendoza
- Gentleman Killer (1967) – Colonel Fernando Ferreras
- Killer Adios (1968) – Sam Ringold
- Cover Girl (1968) – Maurice Behar
- Uno straniero a Paso Bravo (1968) – Acombar
- Los flamencos (1968) – Kuis
- Go for Broke (1968) – Paco Nuñez
- A Stroke of 1000 Millions (1968) – Teopulos
- Pistol for a Hundred Coffins (1968) – Chavel, Madman
- Uno a uno, sin piedad (1968) – Sheriff Lyman
- The Mercenary (1968) – Alfonso García
- No le busques tres pies... (1968) – Juan
- Tiempos de Chicago (1969) – Captain Harper
- Pagó cara su muerte (1969) – Trevor
- Bootleggers (1969) – Sir Louis Baymond
- El taxi de los conflictos (1969) – Comisario Diéguez
- Sharon vestida de rojo (1969) – Matthews
- Eagles Over London (1969) – German officer
- Cry Chicago (1969) – Dick O'Connor
- Cuatro noches de boda (1969) – Miguel
- Las nenas del mini-mini (1969) – Padre de Chalo
- Homicidios en Chicago (1969) – Arthur
- El perfil de Satanás (1969) – Staub
- El mesón del gitano (1970) – Jaime
- Os cinco Avisos de Satanás (1970) – Leonardo
- Shango (1970) – Maj. Droster
- Helena y Fernanda (1970)
- ¿Quién soy yo? (1970) – General Varclano
- Viva Cangaceiro (1970) – Governor Branco
- Il tuo dolce corpo da uccidere (1970) – Franz Adler
- Sabata the Killer (1970) – Mangosta
- Apocalypse Joe (1970) – Berg
- Compañeros (1970) – Mexican Colonel
- Trasplante de un cerebro (1970) – Clifton Reynolds
- La araucana (1971) – Virrey Lagasca
- Dead Men Ride (1971) – Redfield
- Il lungo giorno della violenza (1971) – Juan Cisneros 'Malpelo'
- Bad Man's River (1971) – General Duarte
- Delusions of Grandeur (1971) – Gen. Huerta Un Grand d'Espagne
- Long Live Your Death (1971) – Gen. Huerta
- The Two Faces of Fear (1972) – Luisi
- La mansión de la niebla (1972) – Mr. Tremont
- Sonny and Jed (1972) – Don García Moreno
- Knife of Ice (1972) – Marcos
- Fuenteovejuna (1972)
- Sting of the West (1972) – Grant
- What Am I Doing in the Middle of the Revolution? (1972) – Herrero
- La redada (1973) – El Conde
- The Scarlet Letter (1973)
- The Killer with a Thousand Eyes (1973) – Costa
- No es bueno que el hombre esté solo (1973) – Don Alfonso
- Fuzzy the Hero (1973) – Cogan
- The Lonely Woman (1973) – Lawyer
- Ricco the Mean Machine (1973) – Cyrano
- Counselor at Crime (1973) – Calogero Vezza (uncredited)
- Yankee Dudler (1973) – Henry
- The Three Musketeers of the West (1973) – Horatio Maurice DeLuc
- Lisa and the Devil (1973) – Francis Lehar
- La hiena (1973) – Capitán Steven
- Una chica y un señor (1974) – Médico
- El último viaje (1974) – Comisario Mendoza
- ¿... Y el prójimo? (1974) – Vicente
- The Four Musketeers (1974) – General
- Siete chacales (1974)
- El último proceso en París (1974) – Mr. Dupont
- The Killer Must Kill Again (1975) – Inspector
- Evil Eye (1975) – Walter, the majordomo
- La cruz del diablo (1975) – Enrique Carrillo
- Lisa and the Devil (1975) – Francis Lehar
- Valley of the Dancing Widows (1975) – Dynamite Dick
- Convoy Buddies (1975) – Monsieur Le Renard
- Juego sucio en Panamá (1975) – Edward
- Las adolescentes (1975) – Ana's Father
- Docteur Justice (1975) – Dr. Alverio
- El socarrón (1975)
- Guapa, rica y... especial (1976) – Don Arístides
- La ragazza dalla pelle di corallo (1976) – Barrymore
- Storia di arcieri, pugni e occhi neri (1976) – Baron / Duke of Sherwood
- Lucecita (1976)
- Las marginadas (1977) – Don Fernando
- La llamada del sexo (1977) – Sr. Montero
- El despertar de los sentidos (1977) – Juan
- Espectro (Más allá del fin del mundo) (1978) – Profesor Antón del Valle
- Venus de fuego (1978) – Padre de Alberto
- Polvos mágicos (1979) – Leandro
- The Shark Hunter (1979) – Il capitano Gómez
- Tres mujeres de hoy (1980) – Rafael
- Nightmare City (1980) – Dr. Kramer
- El niño de su mamá (1980) – Enrique
- Buitres sobre la ciudad (1981) – Bonardis
- Asalto al casino (1981) – Director of Security
- El lago de las vírgenes (1982) – Sebastián
- Oasis of the Zombies (1982) – Colonel Kurt Meitzell
- La vida, el amor y la muerte (1982)
- Vatican Conspiracy (1982) – Rettore
- Pájaros de ciudad (1983)
- Hundra (1983) – Chieftain
- Exterminators of the Year 3000 (1983) – Senator
- Yellow Hair and the Fortress of Gold (1984) – Man-Who-Knows
- Café, coca y puro (1985) – Tío de Pablo
- Bangkok, cita con la muerte (1985) – Flanagan
- Mordiendo la vida (1986) – Don Ricardo
- Esto es un atraco (1987) – Ramón
- Fratello dello spazio (1988) – General Bradley
