= Piero Lulli =

Italian actor

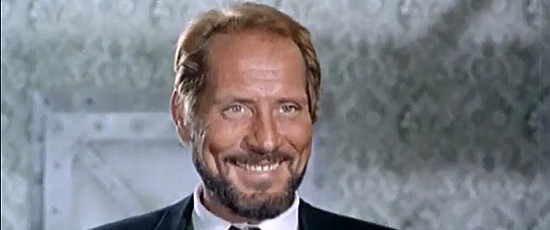
- Piero Lulli as Collins in For the Taste of Killing (1966)
- Born: 1 February 1923; Florence, Italy
- Died: 23 June 1991 (aged 68); Rome, Italy
- Occupation: Actor
- Years active: 1942–1977

Piero Lulli (1 February 1923 – 23 June 1991) was an Italian film actor. He appeared in 111 films between 1942 and 1977. He was the younger brother of actor Folco Lulli.

== Selected filmography ==
- A Pilot Returns (1942) - De Santis
- Love Story (1942) - Gianni Castelli
- Knights of the Desert (1942)
- Uno tra la folla (1946) - Renato
- Tragic Hunt (1947) - L'autista
- L'eroe della strada (1948) - Paolo
- How I Lost the War (1948) - Ufficiale tedesco sul ponte
- Vertigine d'amore (1949) - Olivero / France: Ollivier Desmichels
- Cintura di castità (1950)
- Rapture (1950)
- Il sentiero dell'odio (1950)
- Song of Spring (1951) - Ugo
- Anna (1951) - Il dottor Manzi
- Operation Mitra (1951)
- Frontier Wolf (1952) - Guido
- Infame accusa (1953) - Marco
- Riscatto (1953) - Rizieri Chiari
- Viva la rivista! (1953)
- Core furastiero (1953) - Giovanni
- Condannata senza colpa (1953) - Barbe Zef
- La prigioniera di Amalfi (1954) - Carlo
- Acque amare (1954) - Leo Ferri
- Ulysses (1954) - Achilles
- Ultima illusione (1954) - Mario
- La campana di San Giusto (1954) - Bruno Visentini
- Di qua, di là del Piave (1954)
- Yalis, la vergine del Roncador (1955)
- Supreme Confession (1956) - Franz
- Pezzo, capopezzo e capitano (1958) - Franco
- Captain Falcon (1958) - Lupo
- I cattivi vanno in paradiso (1959) - Il sacerdote
- Wolves of the Deep (1959) - Teppista
- Il principe fusto (1960)
- The Huns (1960) - Seikor
- Vacanze in Argentina (1960)
- The Last of the Vikings (1961) - Hardak - uomo di Sveno (uncredited)
- Sword Without a Country (1961) - Benedetto
- Duel of the Titans (1961) - Sulpicius
- Hawk of the Caribbean (1962) - Manuel
- Samson Against the Sheik (1962) - Ramiro
- Julius Caesar Against The Pirates (1962) - Edom
- Passport for a Corpse (1962) - Piero
- Charge of the Black Lancers (1962)
- Gladiator of Rome (1962) - General Astarte
- The Fury of Achilles (1962) - Odysseus
- Attack of the Normans (1962) - Barton
- The Defeat of the Barbarians (1962) - Manfredi
- Duel at the Rio Grande (1963) - Herrero
- The Sign of the Coyote (1963) - Lenny
- Goliath and the Sins of Babylon (1963) - Pergasos
- The Beast of Babylon Against the Son of Hercules (1963) - Balthazar
- The Organizer (1963) - (uncredited)
- Revenge of the Musketeers (1963)
- Hercules and the Black Pirates (1964) - Rodrigo Sanchez
- Parias de la gloire (1964)
- The Triumph of Hercules (1964) - Euristeo
- The Two Gladiators (1964) - Cleandro
- Revolt of the Praetorians (1964) - Domiziano
- Giants of Rome (1964) - Pompeus
- The Beast of Babylon Against the Son of Hercules (1964) - Wrestler #3
- Gladiators Seven (1964) - Silone
- Bullet in the Flesh (1964) - Jonathan
- Buffalo Bill, Hero of the Far West (1965) - Red
- Goliath at the Conquest of Damascus (1965) - Thor
- Conqueror of Atlantis (1965) - Ramir
- Challenge of the Gladiator (1965) - Consul Metello
- Hands of a Gunfighter (1965) - Davy Castle
- Una ráfaga de plomo (1965)
- Savage Gringo (1966) - Bill Carter
- Kill, Baby, Kill (1966) - Inspector Kruger
- Taste of Killing (1966) - Collins
- El Rojo (1966) - Lasky
- Fury of Johnny Kid (1967) - Sheriff Cooper
- Kitosch, the Man Who Came from the North (1967) - Major Zachary Backer
- Adios, Hombre (1967) - Luke Brabham
- Django Kill (1967) - Oaks
- Cjamango (1967) - El Tigre
- Vengeance Is Mine (1967) - Jurago
- The Dirty Outlaws (1967) - Sam
- Gente d'onore (1967)
- Ringo the Lone Rider (1968) - Daniel G. Samuelson
- Un diablo bajo la almohada (1968) - Rafael
- Vengeance Is My Forgiveness (1968) - John Kildare
- Pistol for a Hundred Coffins (1968) - J. Texas Corbett
- God Made Them... I Kill Them (1968) - Sheriff Lancaster
- All on the Red (1968) - Laszlo
- OSS 117 – Double Agent (1968) - Heindrich Van Dyck - un rappresentante dell'ONU
- Pistol for a Hundred Coffins (1968) - J. Texas Corbett
- Find a Place to Die (1968) - Paul Martin
- Dead Men Don't Count (1968) - Sheriff Bob Watson
- Hell Commandos (1969) - Col. Kreuzfeld
- The Forgotten Pistolero (1969) - Francisco
- Eros e Thanatos (1969)
- The Avenger, Zorro (1969) - Buck
- Sartana's Here… Trade Your Pistol for a Coffin (1970) - Samuel Spencer
- Chapaqua (1970) - Major / Captain Garrett
- When Heroes Die (1970) - Erwin Rommel
- Cloud of Dust... Cry of Death... Sartana Is Coming (1970) - Grand Full
- My Dear Killer (1972) - Alessandro Moroni
- The Boldest Job in the West (1972) - Jeremias
- Come fu che Masuccio Salernitano, fuggendo con le brache in mano, riuscì a conservarlo sano (1972) - Fra' Jeronimo
- My Name is Nobody (1973) - Sheriff
- The Fighting Fist of Shanghai Joe (1973) - Stanley Spencer
- Il figlio della sepolta viva (1974) - Amadeus
- Young Lucrezia (1974) - Ludovico Maria Sforza 'il Moro'
- Carambola's Philosophy: In the Right Pocket (1975) - Colonel
- Zwei tolle Hechte – Wir sind die Größten (1975) - Minstrel / El Moro
- Nazi Love Camp 27 (1977) - General at the Nazi Brothel
