= Killer Adios =

1968 film

- Directed by: Primo Zeglio
- Starring: Peter Lee Lawrence
- Music by: Claudio Tallino
- Release date: 1968
- Country: Italy
- Language: Italian

Killer Adios (also known as Killer Goodbye, Winchester Justice and Winchester One of One Thousand) is a 1968 Italian Spaghetti Western directed by Primo Zeglio.

== Cast ==
- Peter Lee Lawrence: Jess Bryan
- Rosalba Neri: Fanny Endes (as Sara Bay)
- Marisa Solinas: Sheila Simpson
- Armando Calvo: Bill Bragg
- Nello Pazzafini: Jack Bradshaw
- Luis Induni: Sheriff Clint Simpson
- Eduardo Fajardo: Sam Ringold
- José Jaspe: Elliott
- Victor Israel: Dixon
- Paola Barbara: Bragg's sister

== Reception ==
Film Mese noticed how the film functioned largely as a detective film, and praised the sensual representation of actresses Solinas and Neri. Lexikon des Internationalen Films wrote: "Relatively bloodless, average spaghetti western". Christian Kessler recommended the film as a highly enjoyable experience, even if you have already seen the ingredients of the story in other titles.

== Releases ==
Wild East released this on a limited edition R0 NTSC DVD alongside Killer Calibre 32, also starring Peter Lee Lawrence, in 2011.
