= Peter Lee Lawrence =

German actor

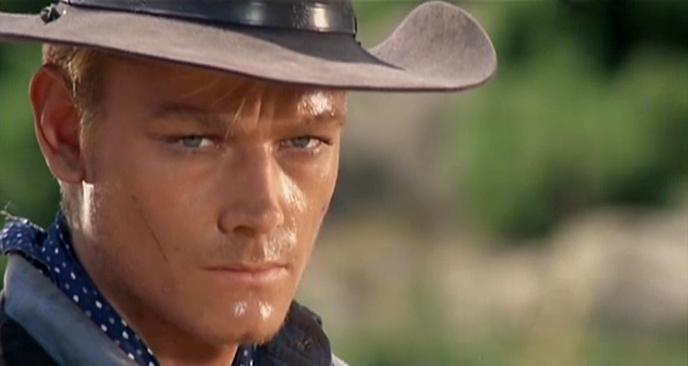
- Peter Lee Lawrence in Una pistola per cento bare (1968)
- Born: Karl Hyrenbach; 21 February 1944; Lindau, Germany
- Died: 20 April 1974 (aged 30); Rome, Italy
- Occupation: Actor
- Spouse: Cristina Galbó (m. 1969)

Peter Lee Lawrence (born Karl Hyrenbach, 21 February 1944 – 20 April 1974) was a German actor and a citizen of France. He enjoyed brief fame as a prolific leading man of Spaghetti Westerns before dying at the age of 30.

== Biography ==
Lawrence lived in Nice for several years with his mother and then in Rome (Italy) with his wife and son. He was also cast in photonovels under the name Pierre Clément.

His first notable film role was a small, uncredited, but important appearance as the brother-in-law of Lee Van Cleef in For a Few Dollars More. From then on he went on to star in 16 more Spaghetti Westerns from 1967 to 1973. He was also credited in several of these films as Arthur Grant. Some of these films were hits in Europe including Killer Caliber .32 (1967), Day of Violence (1967), Fury of Johnny Kid (1967), The Man Who Killed Billy the Kid (1967), Killer Adios (1968). He was a particularly popular actor in Cuba.

In 1971, Lawrence had a supporting role in Black Beauty. He continued acting until his death. He had 30 film credits in his nine-year career. He played Carlos on Los Caballeros del Botón de Ancla (1974), his last credited appearance.

== Death ==
He met actress Cristina Galbó during the filming of Dove si spara di più in 1967, and they married two years later on 30 July 1969, remaining married until his death.

In 1972 Lawrence began suffering from headaches. Once filming finished on Los Caballeros del Botón de Ancla, he was admitted to the Foundation Jimenez Diaz Hospital in Madrid, where he was operated on. The surgery was a success, but the biopsy report revealed it was glioblastoma. He moved to Zurich, where he began both chemo and radium treatment. On 25 March 1974 Lawrence was admitted to the Villa Stuart Clinic in Rome with severe stomach pains. He died on 20 April 1974, at 3:10 in the morning, from a brain tumor.

== Filmography ==
- For a Few Dollars More (1965) - Mortimer's Brother-in-Law (uncredited)
- Fury of Johnny Kid (1967) - Johnny Mounters
- I'll Kill Him and Return Alone (1967) - William 'Billy the Kid' Bonney
- Killer Caliber .32 (1967) - Silver
- Day of Violence (1967) - Johs Lee
- Killer Adios (1968) - Jess Bryan
- Hell in Normandy Testa di sbarco per otto implacabili (1968) - Lt. Strobel
- Pistol for a Hundred Coffins (1968) - Jim Slade
- Uno a uno, sin piedad (1968) - Bill 'Chico' Grayson
- Death on High Mountain (1969) - Loring Vandervelt
- Tiempos de Chicago (1969) - Erik
- Garringo (1969) - Johnny
- La furia dei Khyber (1970) - Sergeant Cullen
- Manos torpes (1970) - Peter Cushmich
- Sabata the Killer (1970) - Peter
- More Dollars for the MacGregors (1970) - Robert McGregor / Blondie
- Black Beauty (1971) - Gervaise
- Four Gunmen of the Holy Trinity (1971) - George
- Raise Your Hands, Dead Man, You're Under Arrest (1971) - Sando Kid
- Un dólar de recompensa (1972) - Danny Lom
- Tarzán y el arco iris (1972) - Richard
- Arizona Kid (1972) - Garringo / Arizona
- Long Arm of the Godfather (1972) - Vincenzo - 'Raffica'
- Il mio corpo con rabbia (1972) - Paolo
- Amore e morte nel giardino degli dei (1972) - Manfredi
- God in Heaven... Arizona on Earth (1972) - Garringo/Arizona
- Mia moglie, un corpo per l'amore (1973) - Marco Santi
- Giorni d'amore sul filo di una lama (1973) - Stefano Bruni
- Il bacio di una morta (1974) - Andrea Valverde
- Los caballeros del botón de ancla (1974) - Carlos Corbián (final film role)
