= Mary Arden =

Mary Arden may refer to:

- Mary Shakespeare (c. 1537–1608), née Mary Arden, mother of William Shakespeare
- Mary Arden, Lady Arden of Heswall (born 1947), British judge
- Mary Arden (actress) (1933–2014), American actress
