= Osvaldo Civirani =

Italian filmmaker (1917–2008)

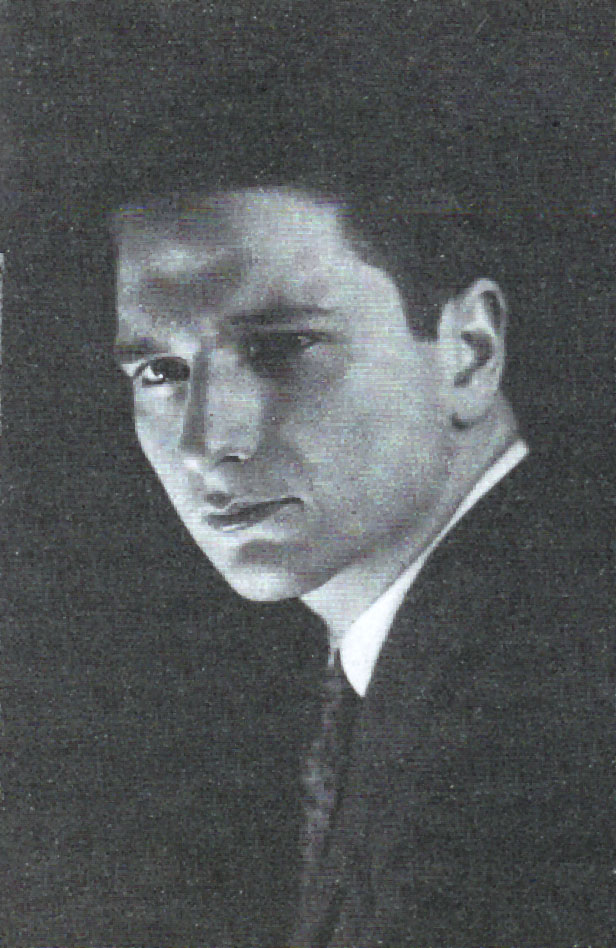
- Born: 19 May 1917; Rome, Italy
- Died: 20 February 2008 (aged 90); Rome, Italy
- Occupation: Film director

Osvaldo Civirani (19 May 1917 – 20 February 2008) was an Italian still photographer, producer, director, cinematographer, screenwriter and author.

Until 1963, Civirani worked mainly as still photographer on over two hundred films.

From 1963 until 1976, Civirani produced and directed 20 films in such diverse genres as erotic mondo film, peplum, eurospy film, Spaghetti Western, costume drama, comedy, giallo, and exotic erotic drama.

As author, he wrote two autobiographical books that were published in 1995 and 2003.

== Early life and still photography ==
Civirani was born in Rome as son of a photographer.

From 1935 to 1965, Civirani was still photographer on the set of more than two hundred films.

In 1943, being hired as still photographer on the set of Luchino Visconti's Ossessione, Civirani introduced the novelty of taking pictures not after the scene was shot - in a constellation that was staged for this purpose -, but while the scene was being shot, using for that purpose the lighter and unobtrusive Plaubel Makina 3. According to Civirani, this was also the first time that the still photographer appeared in the title credits.

Civirani continued working as still photographer for other Italian directors such as Alessandro Blasetti (Fabiola), Federico Fellini (The White Sheik), Roberto Rossellini (The Flowers of St. Francis) and Carlo Lizzani (Chronicle of Poor Lovers).

== Film directing ==
From 1963 to 1976, Civirani produced and directed 20 films in various genres.

It started in 1963 when Civirani convinced the producer Gino Mordini to co-finance with himself the low-budget night report Sexy proibito consisting of about 15 variety show numbers and six ballet numbers and compositions by Gino Landi, which Civirani directed with a troupe of 12 people in 12 days mostly at the De Paolis studio and pioneered using an Arriflex 35, a cheaper and lighter camera normally only used for news and documentaries, for a proper film. The soundtrack by Lallo Gori and the commentary written and spoken by Dino Verde were added afterwards at the moviola. Sexy proibito proved to be an unexpected financial success, which caused Mordini to produce another one like it on his own, titled Sexy proibitissimo.

In 1964, Civirani in turn produced and directed a second report film of his own titled Tentazioni proibite (Forbidden Temptations). The film was shot in techniscope with a very small troupe including, again, Gino Landi and Giuseppe Giannini as cameraman. The first numbers were shot on location at the Berlin Wall, at the Reeperbahn, in Soho and on the third platform of the Eiffel Tower for a striptease - a trip of nine days, after which a striptease in a gondola on the Grand Canal and a few dance numbers were added, including one starring Yvonne De Carlo.

In 1965, Civirani co-wrote, produced and directed the sword-and-sandal film Hercules Against the Sons of the Sun starring Mark Forest and Giuliano Gemma, which was shot in four weeks, and subsequently a second adventure film, Kindar the Invulnerable, starring, again, Mark Forest as well as Rosalba Neri, Mimmo Palmara and Orchidea De Santis and shot on location in Egypt with 300 horses and 200 camels and riders from the Egyptian cavalry.

In Civirani's next film, the western Sheriff with the Gold, Klaus Kinski was to have a major role, but Civirani tore up the contract due to Kinski insisting on his clause securing him the right to change any sequence as he saw fit. The film was shot with a small troupe in Sardinia starring Jacques Berthier and Kathleen Parker. Civirani used the pseudonym Richard Kean as it had become a fashion in Italian westerns to use American names.

For his next film, the eurospy film Operation Poker, Ken Clark had signed up as protagonist. Civirani asked for a new actor when Clark had not cut his hair as Civirani had asked, and was given Roger Browne. The film was shot on a tight schedule in Copenhagen at the Tuborg Brewery, in Lugano, in Marrakesh and in Torremolinos. Civirani remembers relentlessly and unsuccessfully courting main actress Josè Greci during the shoot, contrary to his own code of conduct.

With The Beckett Affair, Civirani produced and directed another eurospy film in 1966. It starred Lang Jeffries and was co-produced with a French company, who helped with the shooting in Paris and sent Civirani two actors: Ivan Desny and Krista Nell.

There followed Civirani's second western, Son of Django starring Guy Madison, Gabriele Tinti, Daniele Vargas and Gordon Mitchell. The film was shot entirely in Rome: the exteriors at the Magliana, the interiors at the De Paolis studio.

Civirani's psychological giallo titled The Devil Has Seven Faces starred Carroll Baker, Stephen Boyd and George Hilton. The co-production with a Spanish company, who was in for 30 percent, broke up during the shoot, and Civirani was left on his own. He also had to reshoot part of the material due to it being out of focus. In the end, Civirani flew to New York City and personally sold an English dubbed version of the film.

Le Mans, Shortcut to Hell, based on a story by Tito Carpi, starred again Lang Jeffries flanked by Edwige Fenech, who was only on set for three days, and Erna Schürer. Civirani's son Walter caught the 1970 real life accident of Jacky Ickx on film, which was used in the film.

With the trio Sandra Milo, George Hilton and John Ireland, Civirani produced and directed the comedic western Trusting Is Good... Shooting Is Better.

In 1968, assisted by historian Maria Bellonci and screenwriter Barbara Alberti, Civirani embarked on a film project based on a story of his own titled ‘‘Lucrezia‘‘ and dealing with the life of Lucrezia Borgia. For the title role, he wished for Czech actress Olga Schoberová, who accepted and managed to catch a flight from Prague to Rome at the last minute, thus managing to escape the consequences of the Warsaw Pact invasion of Czechoslovakia. For the role of Pope Alexander VI, Civirani contacted Orson Welles and visited him during the shoot of ‘‘Battle of Neretva in Dubrovnic. Welles afterwards signed the contract, but had to back down in the end due to his commitment to the Yugoslawian government and was substituted by Leon Askin. Lucrezia was shot at the De Paolis studio in Rome, then in the woods of Manziana, where Fiorella Mannoia acted as body double for Schoberová in a nude riding scene, and finally at the Villa Farnese in Caprarola, where Landi also staged a dance choreography.

When the case of Matthias Defregger was in the news, the auxiliary bishop of Munich who in 1944 as Hauptmann of the 114th Jäger Division had been forced to shoot 17 hostages in the Italian hamlet Filetto di Camarda near L'Aquila, Civirani decided to make a film about it titled Quel giorno Dio non c'ero (literal translation: "That day God was not there"), founding the production company "Escalation Film". He went to Filetto "a couple of times" to speak with witnesses and set up a treatment, aided by a young journalist. For the shoot, he went there with a troupe of 12 people and the actors, among them Ivano Staccioli and Anna Miserocchi, recruited extras on location, who all helped in the reconstruction. This latter process brought to light new facts, which resulted in the screenplay being adapted on the fly. The resulting film was distributed by "Euro International" and barely turned in the already low guaranteed minimum in Italy. However, Civirani could turn a small profit through foreign sales.

In 1971, Civirani produced and directed a film with the comedic duo Ric e Gian titled Ric e Gian alla conquista del West (Rick and John, Conquerors of the West). The predictions for the film's success were very favorable, but it failed at the box office: It had cost 80 million lire, of which it returned only 30. According to Civirani, this was due to an unfortunate distribution strategy.

In the following years, Civirani produced and directed a total of four films with Franco and Ciccio. He started with the intent of shooting only two, Two Sons of Trinity and I due gattoni a nove code... e mezza ad Amsterdam, founding the production company "Production International Films" for the purpose and convincing Giulio Sbarigia from "Fono Roma" to co-produce the films with him at 30 percent participation, who in turn managed to secure 20th Century Fox as distributor for Two Sons of Trinity. According to Civirani, it was the first Franco and Ciccio film to appear on an American distribution list. Civirani then shot two more films with the comedic duo, the mafia-themed I due pezzi da 90, and I 2 della Formula 1 alla corsa più pazza del mondo.

On 14 August 1974, Civirani and his foreign production secretary Umberto Chinigo travelled to Santo Domingo to scout for a possible co-production. After the financial disaster of Ugo Liberatore's film Noa-Noa in which the Dominican Republic had lost 100.000 dollars, no Italian production company was involved on site anymore, although film equipment had been left behind. Civirani signed a co-production contract with Hugo Mateo and his company "Filmica La Trinitaria". After a brief return to Rome came back on 20 September 1974 and shot the voodoo-themed Il pavone nero (literal: "The Black Peacock") starring Karin Schubert mostly on location at Boca Chica and at the hotel "Viña del Mar", where a pagan altar was erected with the help of Haitian sugarcane harvesters who still practised the religion more than the locals.

In 1975, Civirani decided to shoot a second film there, La ragazza dalla pelle di corallo (literal: "The Girl with the Coral Skin"), again in co-production with Hugo Mateo. Civirani wrote the screenplay, which was semi-autobiographical. The film was shot for the most part at the Hotel Ambassador, where Civirani had reserved 20 rooms for four weeks for the purpose. This time, he used a Spanish troupe from the co-producing "Tecisa Film", with whom there were several difficulties during the shoot. The film's starring actress Rosanna Schiaffino did not travel to Santo Domingo, all her scenes were shot in Rome. The film also starred Gabriele Tinti and Eduardo Fajardo.

== Later years ==
After these, Civirani retired from his activities in film production. With his company "Parade Films Import-Export", he bought foreign films, dubbed them, and sold them to regional distributors. Civirani also founded the "Jolly Videoreg" which he used to sell VHS editions of his own films and those foreign films for which he had the home video distribution rights. Finally, Civirani also sold the rights to his films, after which both his companies were dissolved.

In 1995, Civirani's autobiographical book Un fotografo a Cinecittà. Tra negativi, positivi, e belle donne (literal English translation: "A photographer at Cinecittà. Inbetween negatives, positives, and beautiful women") was published, and in 2003, a second autobiographical book titled Le donne dei sogni. Amori e trasgressioni sui set cinematografici (lit.: "The Women of the Dreams. Love relations and transgressions on the cinematographic sets") was published, both by Gremese Editore. The latter is dedicated to Civirani's sons Walter and Fabrizio.

== Filmography ==
Civirani both produced (or co-produced) and directed a total of 20 films:

- Sexy proibito (1962)
- Tentazioni proibite (1963)
- Hercules Against the Sons of the Sun (1965)
- Kindar the Invulnerable / Kindar l'invulnerabile (1964)
- Sheriff with the Gold / Uno sceriffo tutto d'oro (1967)
- Operation Poker (1966)
- The Beckett Affair / L'affare Beckett (1966)
- Son of Django (1966)
- Trusting Is Good... Shooting Is Better (1968)
- Lucrezia (1968)
- Ric e Gian alla conquista del West (1968)
- The Devil Has Seven Faces (1969)
- Quel giorno Dio non c'era (1969)
- Le Mans, Shortcut to Hell (1970)
- Two Sons of Trinity (1971)
- I due gattoni a nove code... e mezza ad Amsterdam (1972)
- I due pezzi da 90 (1972)
- I 2 della Formula 1 alla corsa più pazza del mondo (1972)
- Il pavone nero (1974)
- La ragazza dalla pelle di corallo (1976)

== Bibliography ==
- Civirani, Osvaldo (2003). Le donne dei sogni. Amori e trasgressioni sui set cinematografici. Rome: Gremese Editore. ISBN 88-8440-250-6.
