= Revenge of the Gladiators =

Revenge of the Gladiators may refer to:

- La vendetta di Spartacus, a 1964 Italian film directed by Michele Lupo starring Roger Browne
- La vendetta dei gladiatori, a 1964 Italian film directed by Luigi Capuano starring Mickey Hargitay
