= Andrea Scotti =

Italian film and television actor (1931–2003)

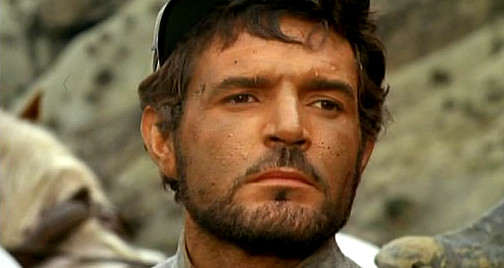
- Scotti in I Want Him Dead (1968)
- Born: 27 August 1931; Naples, Italy
- Died: 21 December 2003 (aged 72); Nepi, Italy
- Occupation: Actor

Andrea Scotti (27 August 1931 – 21 December 2003) was an Italian film and television actor.

== Background ==
Born in Naples, Scotti attended the Centro Sperimentale di Cinematografia in Rome, graduating in 1956. During his career, he was mainly active in genre films, particularly peplum, Spaghetti Western and crime films. He was sometimes credited Andrew Scott. Scotti died in Nepi on 21 December 2003, at the age of 72.

== Selected filmography ==
- Captain Falcon (1958)
- Three Strangers in Rome (1958)
- Death of a Friend (1959)
- Attack of the Moors (1959)
- Ragazzi del Juke-Box (1965) as the Dark-haired man in striped t-shirt at La Fogna
- Atom Age Vampire (1960)
- The Huns (1960)
- Don Camillo: Monsignor (1961)
- Taras Bulba, the Cossack (1962)
- Samson and the Slave Queen (1963)
- The Sign of the Coyote (1963)
- Hercules and the Tyrants of Babylon (1964)
- Hercules and the Treasure of the Incas (1964)
- The Beast of Babylon Against the Son of Hercules (1964)
- Come inguaiammo l'esercito (1965)
- Blood for a Silver Dollar (1965)
- Captain from Toledo (1965)
- Conqueror of Atlantis (1965)
- Operation Poker (1965)
- Agent 077: Mission Bloody Mary (1965)
- In a Colt's Shadow (1965)
- Blood for a Silver Dollar (1965)
- Buffalo Bill, Hero of the Far West (1965)
- Come inguaiammo l'esercito (1965) as Captain who orders Franco and Ciccio
- Password: Kill Agent Gordon (1966)
- Special Code: Assignment Lost Formula (1966)
- Johnny Colt (1966)
- Son of Django (1967)
- Il lungo, il corto, il gatto (1967) as Martinez
- Trusting Is Good... Shooting Is Better (1968)
- I Want Him Dead (1968)
- Django, Prepare a Coffin (1968)
- Pistol for a Hundred Coffins (1968)
- Adiós, Sabata (1970)
- The Price of Death (1971)
- The Fifth Cord (1971)
- Poppea: A Prostitute in Service of the Emperor (1972)
- Where the Bullets Fly (1972)
- Those Dirty Dogs (1973)
- The Killer Reserved Nine Seats (1974)
- Terror Express (1976)
- Werewolf Woman (1976)
- Fearless (1978)
