= Letícia Román =

Italian actress (1941–2025)

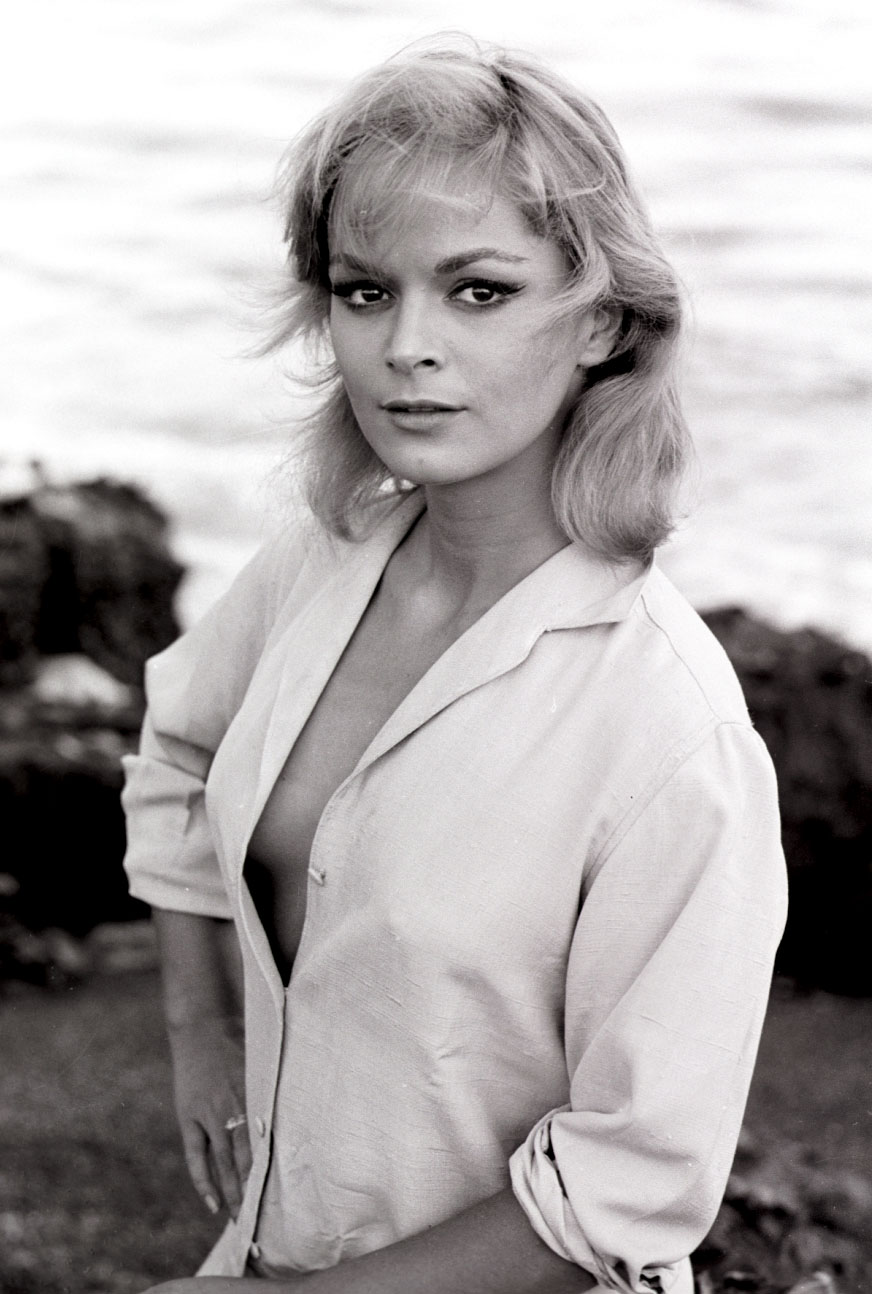
- Román in 1961
- Born: Letizia Novarese; August 12, 1941; Rome, Italy
- Died: June 26, 2025 (aged 83); Fort Myers, Florida, U.S.
- Occupation: Actress
- Years active: 1960–1966
- Spouse: Peter Anthony Gelles (m. 1970)
- Children: 1
- Parent(s): Vittorio Nino Novarese; Giuliana Gianni

Letícia Román (née Novarese; August 12, 1941 – June 26, 2025) was an Italian-born film actress.

== Early life ==
Román was born Letizia Novarese in Rome on August 12, 1941. She was the daughter of stage actress Giuliana Gianni and screenwriter/costume designer Nino Novarese.

Taught by tutors, Roman received the equivalent of an American high school education. She was fluent in five languages.

Roman said that her parents did not want her to be an actress, but after arriving in Hollywood, she began studying acting under Sandy Meisner. She studied with Gladys Vogeler to diminish her accent.

== Career ==
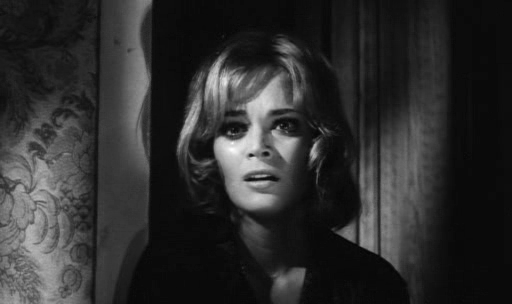
Román in The Girl Who Knew Too Much (1963)

Román started her film career with a small part in the Elvis Presley film G.I. Blues, where she plays Tina. Román had her first leading role in the film The Girl Who Knew Too Much (1963), where she plays Nora Davis, a mystery obsessed woman who believes she has witnessed a murder. After completing the film, Román went to Germany, where she made several films, including Russ Meyer's Fanny Hill.

== Later life and death ==
Román retired from acting after getting married in 1966 to Peter Anthony Gelles, by whom she had one child. According to actor John Saxon, Román later worked in the real estate business in Los Angeles briefly.

Román died in Fort Myers, Florida on June 26, 2025, at the age of 83.

== Selected filmography ==
- G.I. Blues (1960)
- Pirates of Tortuga (1961)
- Gold of the Seven Saints (1961)
- Charge of the Black Lancers (1962)
- Pontius Pilate (1962)
- The Girl Who Knew Too Much (1963)
- Fanny Hill (1964)
- Marry Me, Cherie (1964)
- The Swedish Girl (1965)
- The Gentlemen (1965)
- Who Wants to Sleep? (1965)
- When the Grapevines Bloom on the Danube (1965)
- Old Surehand (1965)
- High Season for Spies (1966)
- F Troop: La Dolce Courage (1966)
- The Spy in the Green Hat (1967)
- Mannix: Make It Like It Never Happened – TV episode (1967)
- I Spy: Casanova from Canarsie – TV episode (1967)
- The Big Valley (1967)
