= Per il gusto di uccidere =

1966 film

Taste of Killing
- Directed by: Tonino Valerii
- Screenplay by: Tonino Valerii
- Story by: Tonino Valerii
- Produced by: Francesco Genesi; Vincenzo Genesi; Daniele Senatore; Stefano Melpignano; Jose Lopez Moreno
- Cinematography: Stelvio Massi
- Edited by: Rosa G. Salgado
- Music by: Nico Massi
- Production companies: Hercules Cinematografica; Montana Films
- Distributed by: Titanus
- Release date: 8 June 1966 (Italy)
- Running time: 88 minutes
- Countries: Italy; Spain
- Box office: ₤495.449 million

Per il gusto di uccidere (internationally released as Taste of Killing, Lanky Fellow and For the Taste of Killing and originally titled as Cacciatore di taglie) is the 1966 Italian Spaghetti Western film debut directed by Tonino Valerii. It is also the first film to use the camera system known as 2P. It was filmed in Almería. It is produced by Francesco Genesi, Vincenzo Genesi, Daniele Senatore, Stefano Melpignano and Jose Lopez Moreno, scored by Nico Massi and edited by Rosa G. Salgado.

== Plot ==
At the start of the story, the band of Sanchez ambushes a military transport escorting $100,000 to Omaha. He leaves together with two men to take the money to Mexico, while the other gang members dress in the uniforms of the dead soldiers and continue the transport, to use this as a cover to enter and rob the bank of Omaha. This nifty plan is undone by the bounty hunter Hank Fellow, who has been watching the attack in the telescopic sight of his rifle – without firing or otherwise interfering. He then takes his time following Sanchez' group, unnerving the men with some long range pot shots, before confronting and killing them in a stand up gunfight at close range. Then he hurries back to warn the town, and the "soldiers" are ambushed at the bank and killed, most of them by Fellows himself.

The mine owner Collins, who urgently needs to ship a load of gold past the dangerous gang of Gus Kennebeck, suggests a deal – Fellows cuts up his 10% reward as an insurance, and gets the double amount back if he manages to get the gold to Omaha and keep it there until a military escort picks it up. Fellows accepts, and when Kennebeck's gang waits in ambush, the bounty killer picks off a few of them, which makes Kennebeck hold off the attack. At night Fellows has the gold taken away from the bank, and refuses to tell Collins where it is. The same night he has observed Kennebeck visiting a woman in town, Isabelle, and the next day he captures Kennebeck's captain Machete after a visit there. The sheriff and his men beat up Machete until he confesses to them that Isabelle is Kennebeck's woman, and when the gang will attack.

When the bandits attack, Fellows blows up a bridge on their way to town. They attack from other directions against the citizens waiting in prepared positions. After a lot of casualties on both sides the bandits reach the bank and make their way into the vault, where Fellows has prepared a barrel of explosives connected to the telegraph line. When a signal is given that they are inside, Fellows orders the telegraph operator to start sending, and the remaining bandits are killed in an explosion.

Kennebeck did not take part in the attack, but when he learns about the outcome he arrives to fight Fellows. He challenges him to drop the rifle with the telescopic sight. When his two remaining men appear, and are killed before they can shoot, Kennebeck goes for that rifle but is shot by Fellows through the sight.

When the military troop arrives, the banker discloses that the gold has been disguised as the new stairs of the bank. Fellows is paid and leaves. On the road he observes the military transport being ambushed by another gang of bandits, and grins.

== Cast ==
- Craig Hill as Hank Fellows
- George Martin as Gus Kennebeck
- Piero Lulli as Collins
- Fernando Sancho as Sánchez
- Rada Rassimov as Isabel
- Franco Ressel as Aarons
- José Manuel Martín as Rodrigo
- George Wang as Mingo / Machete
- Diana Martín as Peggy / Molly Kennebeck
- Graham Sooty as Jefferson
- José Marco as John Kennebeck
- Lorenzo Robledo as Sheriff
- Sancho Gracia as Bill Kilpatrick
- José Canalejas as Peter
- Dario De Grasi as Steve
- Enrique Santiago as Sanchez henchman
- Frank Braña
- Olga Karlatos as Molly

== Release ==
Per il gusto di uccidere was released in Italy on 8 June 1966 where it was distributed by Titanus. The film grossed a total of 495.449 million Italian lire in Italy.

== Reception ==
In his investigation of narrative structures in Spaghetti Western films, Fridlund writes that Per il gusto di uccidere, unlike influential Spaghetti Western films like For a Few Dollars More or Django, presents a protagonist who is always in control. The developments never put him at the mercy of any villain, so he is never subject to torture. He does not go out of his way to pursue a second motive, and his choices do not put any loved ones of his in danger. However, these kinds of complications are not missing, but instead befall other characters in the story.

== Releases ==
Wild East released this on an out-of-print limited edition R0 NTSC DVD in 2006

== Bibliography ==
- Curti, Roberto (5 August 2016). Tonino Valerii: The Films. McFarland Publishing. p. 232. ISBN 978-1476626185.
