= Marry Me, Cherie =

1964 film

Marry Me, Cherie (German: Heirate mich, Chéri) is a 1964 German-Austrian comedy film directed by Axel von Ambesser and starring Paul Hubschmid, Letícia Román and Ann Smyrner. It is based on a novel by Gábor Vaszary.

== Cast ==
- Paul Hubschmid as Andreas
- Letícia Román as Christine
- Ann Smyrner as Marianne
- Peter Weck as Georg
- Adeline Wagner as Susanne
- Fritz Muliar
- Helli Servi
- Lotte Lang
- Hugo Gottschlich
