= Aïché Nana =

Lebanese-Italian dancer and stripper (1935/36–2014)

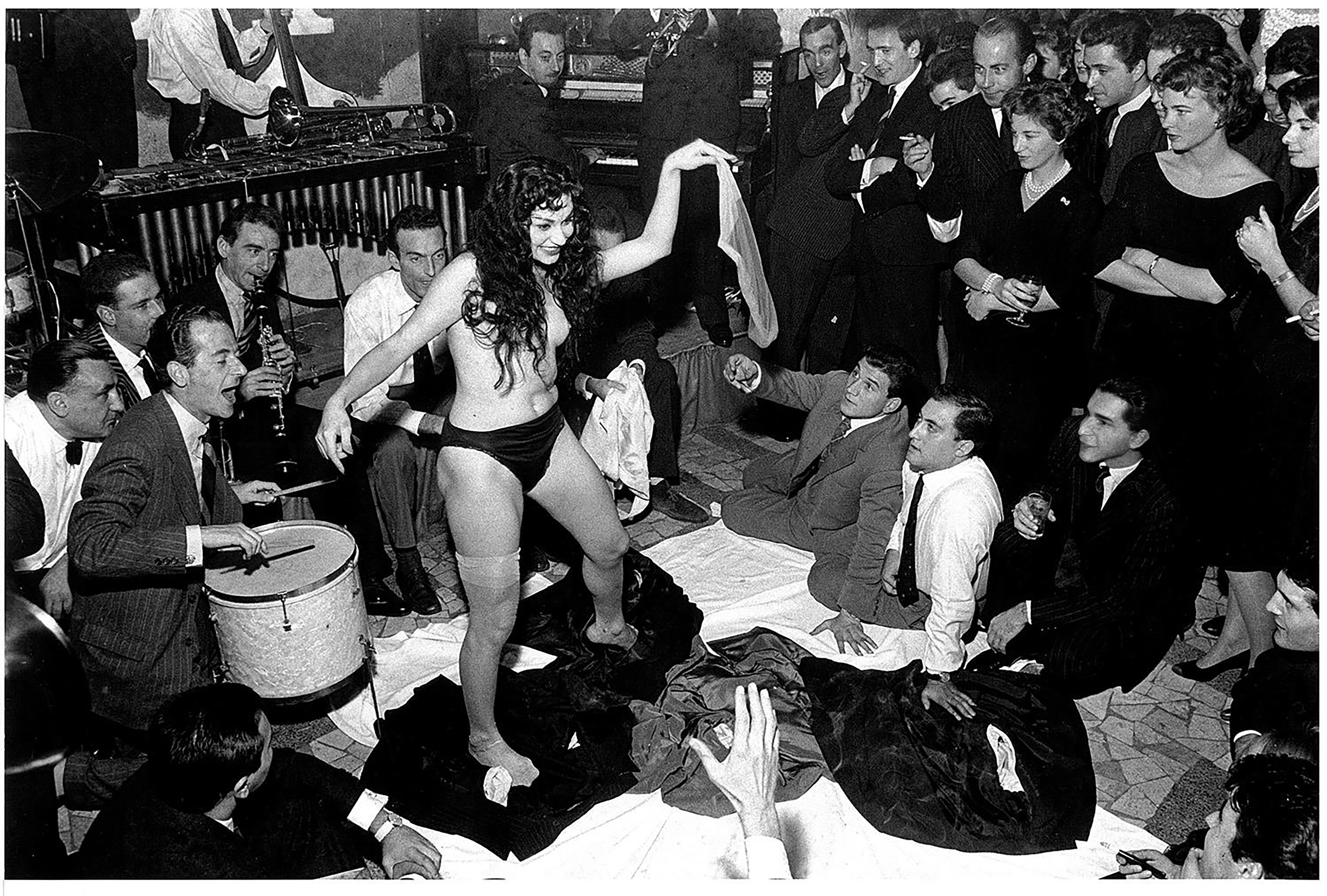
- Aïché Nana during an infamous striptease in Trastevere (Rome), 1958
- Born: Kiash Nanah; 1935 or 1936; Beirut, Lebanon
- Died: January 29, 2014 (aged 78); Rome, Italy
- Occupations: Actress, dancer, stripper
- Years active: 1954–2014
- Spouse: Sergio Pastore

Kiash Nanah (1935/36 – 29 January 2014), better known by her stage name Aïché (Ayşe) Nana, was a Lebanese-born dancer and stripper.

Born in Beirut, Lebanon to Armenian parents, she began her career in 1954, before moving to France then Italy and becoming a belly dancer. She was married to Italian film director and producer and screenwriter Sergio Pastore.

She became a celebrity in Italy, following a famous striptease on 5 November 1958 during a private party at the Rugantino restaurant and nightclub on the Viale di Trastevere in Rome, which caused a national scandal and went on to provide the inspiration for the 'orgy' scene in Federico Fellini's film La dolce vita.

== Death ==
Nana died from cancer on 29 January 2014 at the Aurelia Hospital in Rome, Italy. She was 78.

== Filmography ==
Year	Title	Role	Notes
1956	The Lebanese Mission	La danseuse	
1956	A Touch of the Sun	Belly Dancer	
1965	Sheriff Won't Shoot	Desiree	
1966	A... For Assassin	Adriana Prescott	
1966	Thompson - 1880	Fanny	
1968	Giurò... e li uccise ad uno ad uno... Piluk il timido	Daisy Sugar Candy	
1968	Due occhi per uccidere	Nadia	
1968	Crisantemi per un branco di carogne		
1970	Edipeon	Lola	
1977	I nuovi mostri	La principessa Altoprati	(segment "First Aid")
1978	Porco mondo		
1978	Enfantasme	Gipsy	
1979	Images in a Convent	Mother Superior	
1983	The Story of Piera	La veggente / Midwife	
1985	King David	Ahinoab	
1991	Strepitosamente... flop	Pon	(final film role)
