= The Devil Has Seven Faces =

- Directed by: Osvaldo Civirani
- Written by: Tito Carpi; Osvaldo Civirani
- Produced by: Osvaldo Civirani
- Starring: Carroll Baker; Stephen Boyd; George Hilton
- Cinematography: Walter Civirani
- Edited by: Mauro Contini
- Music by: Stelvio Cipriani
- Distributed by: Variety Distribution
- Release date: 9 December 1971 (Italy)
- Running time: 90 minutes
- Country: Italy
- Language: Italian

The Devil Has Seven Faces (Italian: Il diavolo a sette facce, also known as The Devil with Seven Faces) is a 1971 Italian giallo film directed and co-written by Osvaldo Civirani. It starred George Hilton, Carroll Baker and Luciano Pigozzi. The film has also been released on video as Bloody Mary (US) and Nights of Terror (UK).

== Plot ==
Carroll Baker plays a dual role in this film, two identical twins named Julie and Mary. While in Holland, Julie begins receiving threats from some mysterious men who attempt to kidnap her, and one of them menaces her while wearing a gorilla mask. They are confusing her with her twin sister Mary in London, who stole a massive diamond from a Maharaja and even betrayed her husband Craig, who was in on the heist. A racecar driver named Tony (George Hilton) saves Julie from being kidnapped and hides her out in an apartment owned by an old blind woman, who later turns up murdered. Luciano Pigozzi plays an insurance investigator who is searching for the diamond.

== Cast ==
- Carroll Baker as Julie Harrison
- Stephen Boyd as Dave Barton
- George Hilton as Tony Shane
- Lucretia Love as Margareth
- Luciano Pigozzi as Steve Hunter
- Ivano Staccioli as Hank
- Daniele Vargas as James Marlowe
- Franco Ressel as Inspector Rinker
- Carla Mancini
- Gianni Pulone
- Roberto Messina
