= Sheriff Won't Shoot =

1965 film

Lo sceriffo che non spara
- Directed by: José Luis Monter; Renato Polselli
- Written by: Vincenzo Cascino; Guido Malatesta
- Release date: 1965
- Countries: Spain; Italy
- Language: Italian

Sheriff Won't Shoot (Italian: Lo sceriffo che non spara, Spanish: El sheriff no dispara) is a 1965 Italian and Spanish Spaghetti Western film.

== Cast ==
- Mickey Hargitay as Allan
- Vincenzo Cascino as Barone Vermont (as Vincent Cashino)
- Dan Clark
- Aïché Nana as Desiree (as Aichè Nanà)
- Pilar Clemens
- Ángel Ter
- Sancho Gracia
- Gianni Dei as Stephen
- Antonio Devi (as Anthony Devi)
- German Grech
- Victor Kasline
- Marco Mariani as Jim
- Solvi Stubing as Rita
- José Luis Zalde
- Manuel Zarzo as Brett
