= A... For Assassin =

1966 film by Angelo Dorigo

- Directed by: Angelo Dorigo
- Written by: Sergio Bazzini; Roberto Natale
- Story by: Ernesto Gastaldi
- Produced by: Walter Brandi
- Starring: Alan Steel; Mary Arden; Ivano Staccioli
- Cinematography: Aldo Tonti
- Edited by: Nella Nannuzzi
- Music by: Aldo Piga
- Release date: 1966
- Running time: 76 minutes
- Country: Italy
- Language: Italian

A... For Assassin (Italian: A... come assassino) is a 1966 Italian mystery film directed by Angelo Dorigo and starring Alan Steel and Mary Arden.

== Plot ==
A wealthy diamond mine owner gets killed, and his relatives (who all hate each other) gather in the family villa for the reading of the will. They are told they must spend an entire month living together in the villa, during which time they will be eliminated down to only three heirs. An aging Scotland Yard detective is present to resolve the first crime that set this whole chain of events into motion. One by one, the relatives are eliminated until there is only one left.

== Cast ==
- Alan Steel as Giacomo
- Mary Arden as Angela Prescott
- Ivano Staccioli as George Prescott (credited as John Heston)
- Ivano Davoli as Armando
- Giovanna Galletti as Marta Prescott
- Charlie Karum (credited as Charlie Charun) as Julien Prescott
- Aïché Nana as Adriana Prescott
- Gilberto Mazzi as Inspector Matt
- Roland Redman as Sergeant Robson
- Giovanna Lenzi as Mary, the Maid (credited as Barbara Pen)
- Aldo Rendine as Jackson
- Franco Pesce as Peter

== Production ==
A... For Assassin was shot at Balsorano castle in April 1966. The film is allegedly based on a story by Ernesto Gastaldi. The title refers to a dagger with the letter "A" carved on it, which plays an important part in the mystery.
