= Operation Poker =

- Film poster by Renato Casaro
- Directed by: Osvaldo Civirani
- Written by: Osvaldo Civirani; Roberto Gianviti
- Produced by: Osvaldo Civirani; Santos Alcocer
- Starring: Roger Browne
- Cinematography: Alfonso Nieva
- Music by: Piero Umiliani
- Release date: 1965
- Countries: Italy; Spain
- Language: Italian

Operation Poker (Italian: Operazione Poker, Spanish: Operación Póker: agente 05-14) is a 1965 Italian-Spanish spy film produced, written and directed by Osvaldo Civirani. The first choice for the main role was Ken Clark, who was replaced by Roger Browne a few days before the start of filming. It was mainly shot in Copenhagen.

== Cast ==
- Roger Browne as Glenn Forest
- José Greci as Helga
- Sancho Gracia as John Parker
- Roberto Messina as Omar (credited as Bob Messenger)
- Carla Calò as Russian Agent (credited as Carol Brown)
- Andrea Scotti as Frank (credited as Andrew Scott)
- Helga Liné as Glenn's Girlfriend
