= Remo Capitani =

Italian actor (1927–2014)

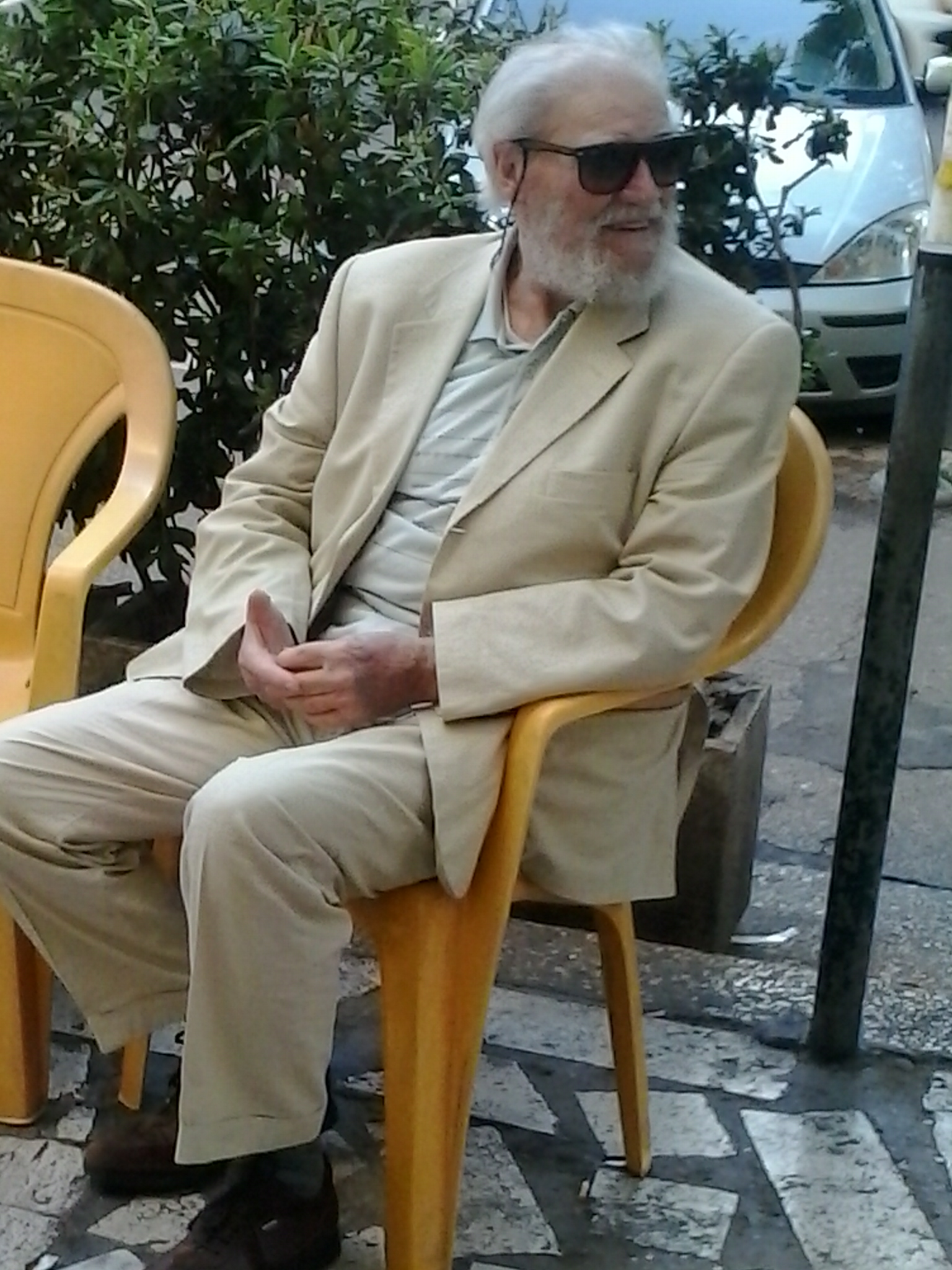
- Remo Capitani in May 2013.
- Born: 19 December 1927; Rome, Italy
- Died: 14 February 2014 (aged 86); Rome, Italy
- Other names: Ray O'Connor; Ray O'Conner
- Occupation: Actor
- Years active: 1966–1979

Remo Capitani (19 December 1927 – 14 February 2014), also known as Ray O'Connor and Ray O'Conner, was an Italian actor from Rome. He was probably best known for his role in the western They Call Me Trinity as Mezcal, a Mexican thief.

Capitani died on 14 February 2014 in his hometown of Rome. He was aged 86.

== Selected filmography ==
- Five for Revenge (1966) – Gonzales henchman (uncredited)
- Kill or Be Killed (1966)
- Two Sons of Ringo (1966) – Indio henchman (uncredited)
- Up the MacGregors! (1967) – Maldonado henchman (uncredited)
- Bill il taciturno (1967) – Henchman (uncredited)
- Son of Django (1967) – Thompson Henchman (uncredited)
- Cjamango (1967) – Paco (uncredited)
- The Last Killer (1967) – Barrett henchman (uncredited)
- Death Rides a Horse (1967) – Scorta di oro (uncredited)
- The Dirty Outlaws (1967) – Man holding Rope (uncredited)
- Bandidos (1967) – Saloon Patron (uncredited)
- Buckaroo: The Winchester Does Not Forgive (1967) – Sheriff Helper (uncredited)
- God Forgives... I Don't! (1967) – Publican in saloon
- Face to Face (1967) – Taylor Henchman (uncredited)
- Don't Wait, Django... Shoot! (1967) – Alvarez henchman (uncredited)
- Colt in the Hand of the Devil (1967) – Hitman (uncredited)
- And Then a Time for Killing (1968) – Man Carrying Sign at Funeral
- Sapevano solo uccidere (1968) – Stagecoach driver
- Today We Kill... Tomorrow We Die! (1968) – Publican (uncredited)
- May God Forgive You... But I Won't (1968) – Sleepy Smart Guard (uncredited)
- Sartana the Gravedigger (1968) – Lieutenant Miguel (uncredited)
- Revenge for Revenge (1968) – Sheriff
- Ace High (1968) – Cangaceiro
- Django the Bastard (1969) – Murdok Henchman Playing with Dynamite (uncredited)
- Chuck Moll (1970) – Jack – Asylum Warden (uncredited)
- Rough Justice (1970) – Sheriff Jack
- I vendicatori dell'Ave Maria (1970) – Pedro Serrano
- They Call Me Trinity (1970) – Mezcal
- Bastard, Go and Kill (1971) – Sgt. Hernandez
- W Django! (1971)
- Ben and Charlie (1972) – Charro
- Panhandle 38 (1972) – El Tornado
- Spirito Santo e le 5 magnifiche canaglie (1972) – Diego d'Asburgo
- Bada alla tua pelle, Spirito Santo! (1972) – Diego di Asburgo
- Two Sons of Trinity (1972) – Requiem (uncredited)
- Così sia (1972) – 2nd Sheriff (uncredited)
- Novelle galeotte d'amore (1972)
- Canterbury proibito (1972) – Friar (segment "Viola")
- The Grand Duel (1972) – Bounty Hunter
- House of 1000 Pleasures (1973)
- Fra' Tazio da Velletri (1973) – Fra' Tazio da Velletri
- Kid il monello del west (1973)
- Abbasso tutti, viva noi (1974) – Mar. Finocchioni – Father of Aristide
- Carambola's Philosophy: In the Right Pocket (1975) – Gonzales
- Porno-Erotic Western (1979) – (final film role)

== Other websites ==
- Remo Capitani at IMDb
