= Mary Arden (actress) =

American actress and model (1933-2014)

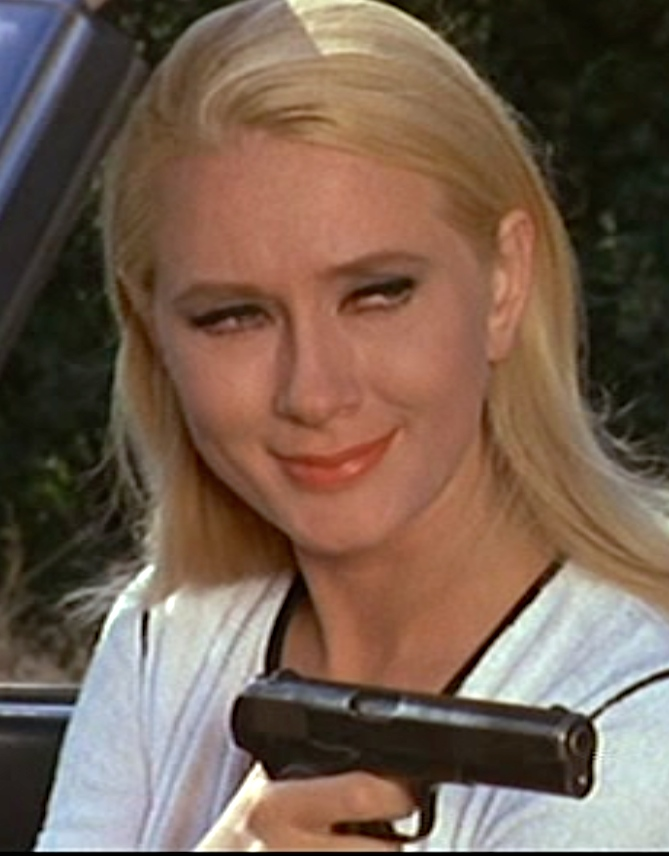
- Arden in Kriminal (1966)
- Born: July 30, 1933; St. Louis, Missouri, U.S.
- Died: December 13, 2014 (aged 81); Brooklyn, New York City, U.S.
- Occupation: Actress
- Spouse: A.A. Hansi (1965–??)

Mary Dawne Arden (July 30, 1933 – December 13, 2014) was an American actress and model, who worked in both Hollywood and Italy.

== Early years ==
Arden was born in St. Louis, Missouri, but moved to New York City at the age of 12 to attend an art school.

== Career ==
Arden had a successful modeling career in Europe and appeared in numerous Italian movies during the 1960s. She made her film debut in Gianni Puccini's comedy The Attic (1962).

Arden's best known role is that of model Peggy Peyton in Mario Bava's Blood and Black Lace. Aside from acting in the film, Arden was also responsible for writing its English dialogue, as she seemed the original translated screenplay to be too stilted.

She also made an uncredited appearance in Juliet of the Spirits as an on-screen TV personality. In the 1960s, she also worked in the United States as a member of the June Taylor Dancers, on the televised Jackie Gleason show.

While in Italy, she also appeared in photo comics including a well-known series of the period, entitled Kriminal. After living and working in Italy for eight years, she returned to the United States in 1979, and performed in only a couple of more roles, before retiring completely from the cinema.

She spent nine years in Latin America where she held marketing and managing positions for Helena Rubinstein Cosmetics. When she returned to NYC, she began her own marketing and body language consulting practice, Arden Associates.

Arden was also on the faculty of New York University, in the Department of Culture and Communication, where she taught business communication.

== Personal life ==
Arden married A.A. Hansi in Rome in 1965.

This actress is not to be confused with Mary Arden, who worked in Hollywood in the 1930s and 1940s, but worked professionally as Mary Arden.

=== Death ===
Arden died in Calvary Hospital in Brooklyn, New York, on December 13, 2014, at the age of 81.

== Filmography ==
Year	Title	Role	Notes	Ref.
1962	The Attic	Gunilla		
1964	Blood and Black Lace	Peggy Peyton		
1964	I maniaci	Blonde Party Guest	Segment: "L'hobby"	
1964	La vendetta di Spartacus	Noblewoman		
1964	I due evasi di Sing Sing	Tall Blonde Woman		
1964	Oh! Those Most Secret Agents!	Nadja		
1965	Juliet of the Spirits	TV Hostess	Uncredited	
1966	A... come assassino	Angela Prescott		
1966	Kriminal	Gloria Farr		
1966	I due sanculotti	Teresina		
1967	Master Stroke	Dorothy		
1971	Doctors' Wives	Lorrie's Relative	Uncredited	
1971	They Call Him Marcado	Rubia		
2012	Bloody Christmas	Sister Rose		
