= The Attic (1962 film) =

1962 film

- Directed by: Gianni Puccini
- Starring: Daniela Rocca; Tomas Milian
- Cinematography: Marcello Gatti
- Edited by: Mario Serandrei
- Music by: Piero Piccioni
- Release date: 1962
- Country: Italy
- Language: Italian

The Attic (Italian: L'attico, also known as The Penthouse) is a 1962 Italian comedy film directed by Gianni Puccini.

== Plot ==
In the 1960s, Silvana, a beautiful girl from the countryside, decides to spend the night in Rome after missing the last bus home. Without a place to stay, she seeks refuge in an under-construction attic. There, she meets a young man, leading to a short-lived romance. He opens her eyes to the wonders of the economic boom shaping the capital in those years. Despite the chaos of buses, protests, and big stores, Silvana chooses to make Rome her home.

After a brief relationship with the first man ends, Silvana starts anew with a young aristocrat from Rome. However, their differences lead to another breakup. Returning to the construction site attic, Silvana coincidentally crosses paths with the young engineer overseeing the project, sparking a new connection. Unfortunately, this story also takes an unexpected turn.

In the end, Silvana marries the wealthy owner of the construction company responsible for the building where the attic is located, who happens to be the father of the engineer. She becomes a wealthy widow just two weeks after tying the knot.

== Cast ==
- Daniela Rocca as Silvana D'Angelo
- Tomas Milian as Claudio
- Mary Arden as Gunilla
- Walter Chiari as Gabriele
- Philippe Leroy as Tommaso
- Lilla Brignone
- Gino Pernice
