= Rififi in Amsterdam (1966 film) =

- Directed by: Sergio Grieco
- Written by: Lucio Battistrada; Armando Crispino; Ramón Comas
- Starring: Roger Browne
- Cinematography: Eloy Mella
- Music by: Piero Umiliani
- Release date: 1966
- Language: Italian

Rififi in Amsterdam (Italian: Rififi ad Amsterdam, Spanish: Rififí en Amsterdam) is a 1966 Italian-Spanish crime-adventure film directed by Sergio Grieco and starring Roger Browne.

== Plot ==
An ex-con and thief must elude the authorities and the criminal underworld as he attempts to locate a stash of jewelry stolen by the Nazis.

== Cast ==
- Roger Browne as Rex Morrison
- Evelyn Stewart as Ethel Fischer, Max Fischer's wife
- Aida Power as Oriana
- Umberto Raho as Vladek
- Franco Ressel as professor Max Fischer
- Tullio Altamura as Manolo
- Erika Blanc (uncredited)
- Franco Lantieri as Frank Linston
- Tito García as Ben
