= The Girl Who Knew Too Much (1963 film) =

1963 film by Mario Bava

- Theatrical release poster
- Italian: La ragazza che sapeva troppo
- Directed by: Mario Bava
- Screenplay by: Ennio De Concini; Enzo Corbucci; Eliana de Sabata; Mino Guerrini; Franco Prosperi; Mario Bava
- Story by: Ennio de Concini; Enzo Corbucci; Eliana de Sabata
- Produced by: Massimo De Rita
- Starring: John Saxon; Letícia Román; Valentina Cortese; Dante DiPaolo
- Cinematography: Mario Bava
- Edited by: Mario Serandrei
- Music by: Roberto Nicolosi
- Production companies: Galatea Film; Coronet Films
- Distributed by: Warner Bros.
- Release dates: 10 February 1963 (Cagliari, Italy)
- Running time: 86 minutes
- Country: Italy
- Language: Italian
- Budget: 190 million Italian lire
- Box office: 80 million Italian lire (Italy)

The Girl Who Knew Too Much (Italian: La ragazza che sapeva troppo) is a 1963 Italian giallo film directed by Mario Bava, starring John Saxon as Dr. Marcello Bassi and Letícia Román as Nora Davis. The plot revolves around a young American woman named Nora, who travels to Rome and witnesses a murder. The police and Dr. Bassi do not believe her, since a corpse has not been found. Several more killings follow, tied to a decade-long string of murder victims chosen in alphabetical order.

The Girl Who Knew Too Much is considered to be the first giallo film, a film genre with a mixture of thriller, sexploitation and horror conventions. An alternative cut titled The Evil Eye was released in the United States and the United Kingdom by American International Pictures; this version features a score by Les Baxter, deletes several scenes, and adds others which place a greater emphasis on comedy compared to the Italian release.

== Plot ==
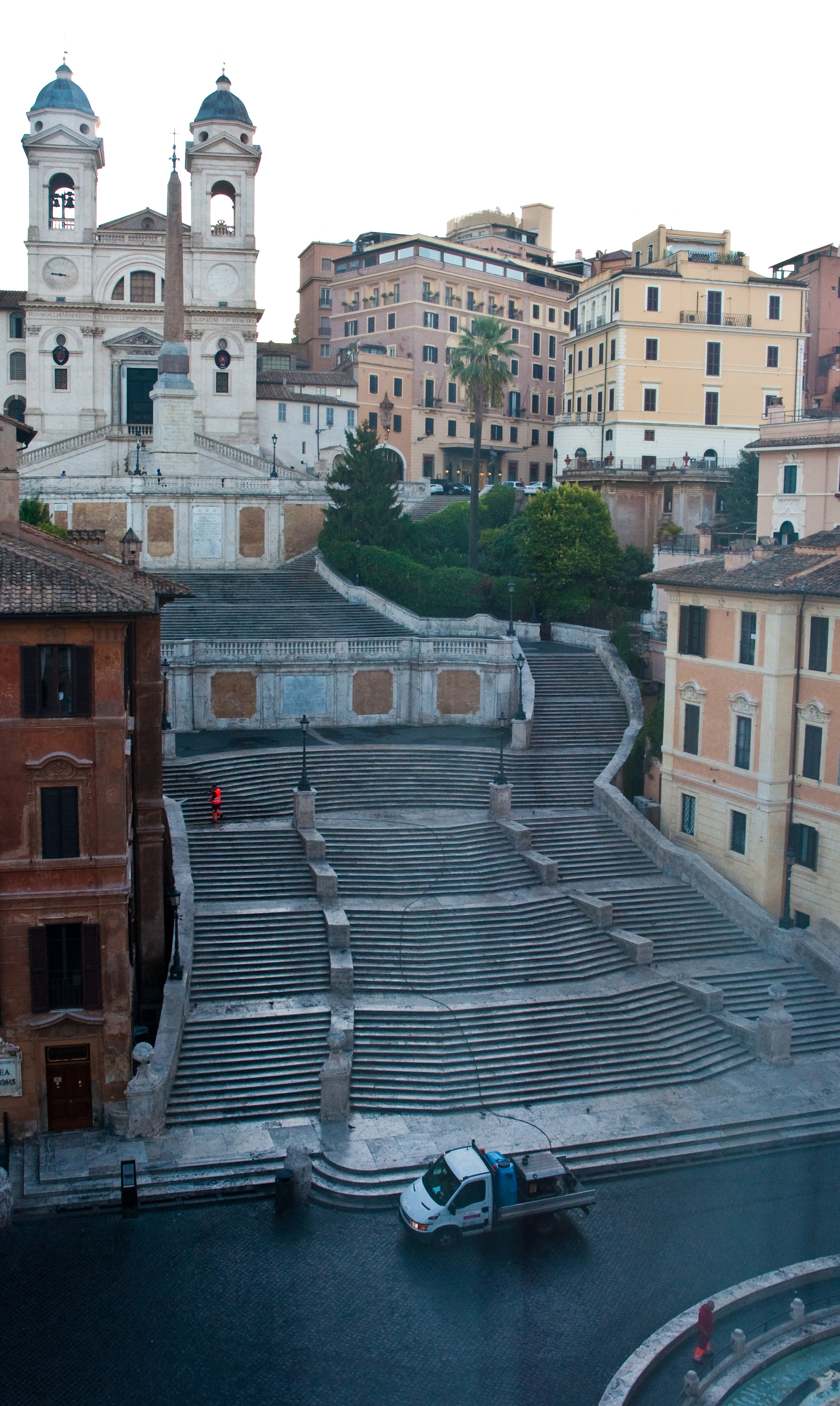
The Spanish Steps, where Nora believes she has witnessed a murder

On vacation, American tourist Nora Davis arrives in Rome to visit her elderly ailing aunt, who is being treated by Dr. Marcello Bassi. On the first night of Nora's visit, her aunt dies and she walks to the nearby hospital to notify Marcello. On the way, she is mugged and knocked out in Piazza di Spagna. When she wakes up, she witnesses a young woman being murdered in front of a house. She also observes a bearded man pulling a knife out of the woman's corpse. Nora then faints. Waking up in the hospital the next morning, she reports the incident to the police, who do not believe her after finding no evidence that a murder has been committed.

At her aunt's funeral, Nora meets a close friend of her aunt's, Laura Craven-Torrani, who lives in Piazza di Spagna. Laura is travelling to Switzerland the next day and offers Nora to stay in her house. At Laura's, Nora comes across newspaper clippings about the "Alphabet Killer", a serial killer whose victims have been murdered in alphabetical order by surname. The killer has already murdered three women whose last names begin with "A", "B" and "C". The latest victim, Laura's sister, was killed ten years earlier in front of Laura's house. Nora receives a telephone call from an anonymous caller who taunts her by saying that "'D' is for death".

Marcello takes Nora on a sightseeing tour of Rome to distract her from the recent events, and they become romantically involved. That night, after Marcello drops Nora off at the Craven house, an anonymous call lures her into an empty apartment. Marcello follows Nora to the apartment, where they find a voice emanating from a tape recorder, telling Nora to be cautious since her last name begins with a "D". They discover the apartment is leased to investigative reporter Andrea Landini. After several unsuccessful attempts to locate him, Nora and Marcello go to the beach to relax.

Upon returning to the Craven house, Nora and Marcello find Landini, who has been told that they had been inquiring about him. Landini has been secretly following them since he spotted Nora in the square. He explains that he collaborated with the police while writing articles about the "Alphabet Murders", leading to the arrest of a mentally ill man named Straccianeve, who denied being the killer. Landini became determined to prove Straccianeve's innocence, but eventually lost his job as a result. Nora agrees to help Landini, but as they tour Rome, they find no clues. The next day, Nora visits Landini's apartment and finds clues that lead her to believe that he is the killer, including the tape recorder, a confession note on his typewriter and a photo of herself labelled as the possible fourth victim. Shortly afterwards, she finds Landini dead, an apparent suicide.

Laura returns to Rome from her trip. Nora reads in the newspaper that the young woman's body has been found. At the morgue, Nora positively identifies the body, and the victim is revealed to be Straccianeve's daughter. Alone in the house that night, Nora notices the study door is ajar. On entering, she sees a man rising from his chair, whom she recognises as the man who was standing over the body. He then collapses to the floor, a knife in his back. Nora is confronted by a deranged Laura, who confesses to the killings. She stabbed that man, her husband, because he wanted to have her committed to a psychiatric hospital. He was actually disposing of the body for his wife the night Nora saw him. Laura reveals that she murdered her sister in order to claim their father's inheritance. Laura prepares to shoot Nora but is shot dead by her dying husband. Nora is happily reunited with Marcello, and they plan to marry soon.

== Cast ==
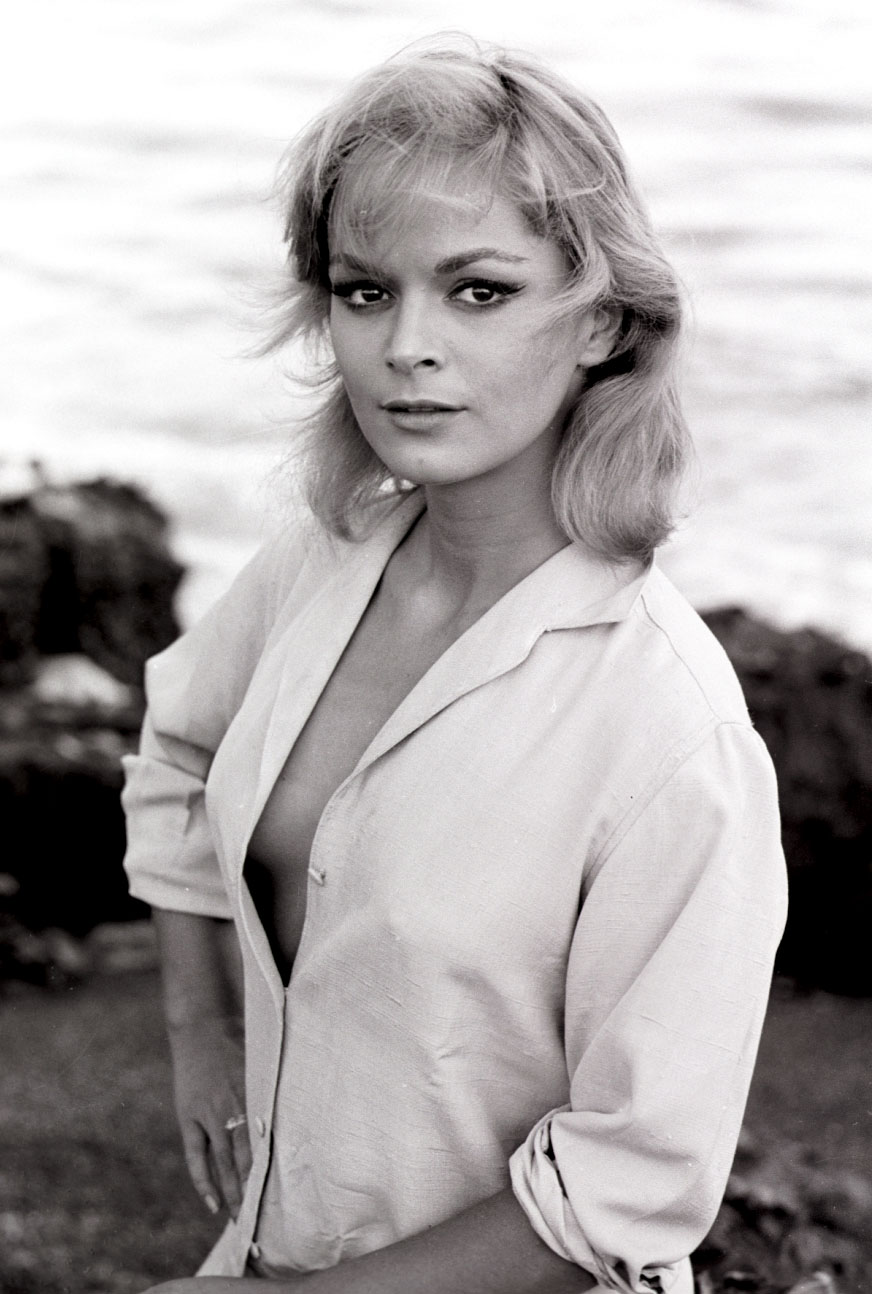
Letícia Román in 1961. The Girl Who Knew Too Much was Román's first leading role.

- John Saxon as Dr. Marcello Bassi
- Letícia Román as Nora Davis ('Nora Drowson' in The Evil Eye)
- Valentina Cortese as Laura Craven-Torrani
- Dante DiPaolo as Andrea Landini
- Titti Tomaino as Police Inspector
- Luigi Bonos as Hotel Clerk
- Milo Quesada as De Vico ('Paccini')
- Walter Williams (credited as Robert Buchanan) as Dr. Alessi
- Gustavo De Nardo as Dr. Facchetti
- Gianni Di Benedetto as Professor Torrani
- Lucia Modugno as Nurse
- Marta Melocco as Murder Victim

Uncredited

- Peggy Nathan as Aunt Ethel
- Mario Bava as Uncle Augusto
- Geoffrey Copleston as Asylum Employee
- Franco Ressel as Police Officer at Airport

== Production ==
=== Development and writing ===
Prior to working on The Girl Who Knew Too Much, Bava had taken a six-month break after filming the last of the special effects shots for his previous film Erik the Conqueror (1961). Bava spent this extended period reading mystery and horror magazines. He pondered retiring from directing and thought he might only return to work on special effects for film. Bava was convinced to return to directing by Samuel Arkoff and Jim Nicholson, who had begun co-producing Italian films for release in the United States. The Girl Who Knew Too Much was the first film in this venture for Arkoff and Nicholson's company American International Pictures (AIP). The film was produced by Galatea Film, which also produced Bava's earlier film Black Sunday (1960), and Coronet films. The film benefited from AIP as a deal was set between the company and Galatea to have confirmed distribution overseas.

The opening credits credit Sergio Corbucci (credited as "Enzo Corbucci"), Ennio De Concini and Eliana de Sabata and the writers of the film, while crediting Bava, Mino Guerrini and Franco Prosperi as collaborators. Italian screenwriter Luigi Cozzi has said that the original script was more of a romantic comedy, but the film became more of a thriller as it went into production.

=== Casting ===
Letícia Román was cast in The Girl Who Knew Too Much, her first leading role. Román knew actor John Saxon prior to production on the film. Saxon has stated that he was invited by Román to work on the film by asking if he would be interested in an art film in Rome. Saxon agreed, but on receiving the script, he found that he misunderstood her as she said horror film instead. Dante DiPaolo stated that Bava initially thought DiPaolo was too young for his role in the film, but after seeing his screen test, he felt DiPaolo understood his part well and cast him in this film and later again in Blood and Black Lace (1964). Film began with tentative title Incubo infuori programma with the planned English title being Incubus.

=== Filming ===
The Girl Who Knew Too Much began shooting on 2 May 1962. Bava thought the plot was silly, and focused more on the technical aspects of the film. This included shooting the film in black and white, Bava's last film shot in this style. Bava had made earlier films in colour, but films in the horror and thriller genre made in Italy were generally shot in black and white in this period. Location shooting in Rome took place at various locations including Leonardo da Vinci–Fiumicino Airport and the Trinità dei Monti. Some set pieces were borrowed from other Italian films, such as the painting in Nora's aunt's house, which is from Divorce Italian Style (1961).

Saxon stated that he had initially gotten along with Bava during production. Later, Saxon would be practicing judo on the beach, which would upset Bava who felt as if Saxon was showing off. Saxon stated that later in a conversation with a producer for the film, that the producer said that Román convinced Saxon to enter the film as she said Saxon was in love with her. Saxon felt that Bava was perhaps initially annoyed at him as he felt his action might have interpreted from Bava as trying to usurp attention from Román. Filming finished on 14 July 1962. Bava biographer Tim Lucas said that some re-shoots were apparently done towards the end of 1962. Bava completed the film at a cost of 190 million Italian lire.

=== Music ===
The theme song of the film is sung by Adriano Celentano. The film's score was by Roberto Nicolosi, who had previously worked with Bava on Black Sunday (1960) and Erik the Conqueror (1961).

== Release ==
The Girl Who Knew Too Much was first released on 10 February 1963 in Cagliari. The film grossed less than $27,000 on its opening and only weekend and failed to cover its own production cost. It was the least commercially successful film in Bava's directorial career. The giallo films were not popular among the Italian film audiences on its initial theatrical release as the genre never gained popularity in its home country until the release of Dario Argento's The Bird with the Crystal Plumage (1970) and The Cat o' Nine Tails (1971). It grossed a total of 80 million Italian lire in Italy.

The Girl Who Knew Too Much was released by American International Pictures in the United States on 6 May 1964, where it was shown on a double bill with Bava's Black Sabbath; this release of the film retitled it as The Evil Eye. Alterations between the two versions include the deletion of several scenes, including all references to marijuana, the addition of more comical scenes, and Roberto Nicolosi's jazz score being replaced with one performed by Les Baxter. The two versions also have different endings. When Bava's films were being released on DVD and Blu-ray, the Evil Eye edit of the film became more difficult to find as Bava's original Italian version of the film was used. This led to audiences knowing the film under its translated Italian title, The Girl Who Knew Too Much.

== Reception ==
In a contemporary review, The Monthly Film Bulletin described the film as "a tolerably silly but quite enjoyable thriller". The reviewer praised the camerawork and acting by Valentina Cortese, whom he compared to Joan Crawford. The reviewer noted the plot, stating that "Bava, always a better cameraman than director hasn't Riccardo Freda's ability to make a merit of cliches, and often seems rather unhappy with his complicated plot, which is packed to the brim with red herrings, lurking shadows and sinister happenings known to thrillerdom."

Bava did not look back positively on the film, claiming that he "thought [the film] was too preposterous. Perhaps it could have worked with James Stewart and Kim Novak, whereas I had... oh, well, I can't even remember their names." On the review aggregator website Rotten Tomatoes, the film holds an approval rating of 71% based on seven reviews, which note the stylish look to the film, but negatively point out its story. James of Blackford Sight & Sound stated, "Although certainly pioneering, The Girl Who Knew Too Much is a low-key, modest film. It would be Bava's subsequent production, the violent, striking Blood and Black Lace, that would announce the genre's arrival in bold primary colours."
