= Blood and Black Lace =

1964 film by Mario Bava

- Italian film poster by Marcello Colizzi
- Original title: 6 donne per l'assassino
- Directed by: Mario Bava
- Produced by: Massimo Patrizi; Alfredo Mirabile
- Starring: Eva Bartok; Cameron Mitchell; Thomas Reiner; Claude Dantes; Dante Di Paolo
- Cinematography: Ubaldo Terzano
- Edited by: Mario Serandrei
- Music by: Carlo Rustichelli
- Production companies: Emmepi Cinematografica; Les Productions Georges de Beauregard; Monachia Film
- Distributed by: Unidis (Italy); Gloria Film (West Germany); Les Films Marbeuf (France)
- Release dates: 14 March 1964 (Italy); 27 November 1964 (West Germany); 30 December 1964 (France)
- Running time: 88 minutes
- Countries: Italy; West Germany; France
- Budget: ITL141.755 million
- Box office: ITL137 million (Italy)

Blood and Black Lace (Italian: 6 donne per l'assassino, lit. 'Six Women for the Murderer') is a 1964 giallo film directed by Mario Bava, and starring Eva Bartok and Cameron Mitchell. The story concerns the brutal murders of a Roman fashion house's models, committed by a masked killer in a desperate attempt to obtain a scandal-revealing diary.

The film began development shortly after Bava had ended his long-time association with Galatea Film, for whom he had made most of his earlier works as a cinematographer and director. Made with a budget that was lower than several of the director's prior horror films, Blood and Black Lace was an Italian, French and West German international co-production between Emmepi Cinematografica, Les Productions Georges de Beauregard and Monachia Film. Different sources and ministerial papers provide varying degrees of information on the authorship of the film's screenplay, with most sources crediting Marcello Fondato, Giuseppe Barillà and Bava as co-writers; co-star Mary Arden is credited with having adapted the script's dialogue into English. Most of the technical staff and several cast members were veterans of Bava's previous films. Principal photography began in Rome in late 1963 with an international, multilingual cast; some actors read their lines fluently, while others performed them phonetically.

Film critics and historians such as Tim Lucas and Roberto Curti have identified Blood and Black Lace as representing an evolution in both Bava's style and the thriller genre depicted in cinema. Having used thriller conventions in his earlier films The Girl Who Knew Too Much and "The Telephone", a segment of Black Sabbath, Bava used this film to combine elements of contemporary West German murder mystery films (krimis) with the lurid juxtaposition of eroticism and violence present in popular fiction of the time, namely the long-running Giallo Mondadori series of pulp novels. Though it did not start a trend in the genre, the film has retrospectively been described as being among the first giallo films, as its exaggerated use of colour photography and eschewing of a traditional mystery in favour of a focus on set pieces of graphic murder would become staples of the form.

The film premiered in Rome on March 14, 1964, where it was commercially unsuccessful. Contemporary and retrospective reviews primarily praised Bava's direction and its visual style, although some found its plot to be weak and lacking in characterisation. After the successful release of Dario Argento's The Bird with the Crystal Plumage in 1970, a wave of gialli were made in Italy, with many sharing stylistic traits from Blood and Black Lace. Works by such filmmakers as Martin Scorsese and Pedro Almodóvar have referenced the film, and it has appeared on several "best of" lists related to thriller, horror and slasher films.

== Plot ==
Isabella, one of many beautiful models employed at Christian Haute Couture, a fashion house in Rome, is walking through the property's grounds at night when she is violently killed by an assailant wearing a white, featureless mask, a black fedora and a trenchcoat. Police inspector Silvestri investigates and interviews Massimo Morlacchi, who co-manages the salon with the recently widowed Countess Cristiana Cuomo. He also questions Isabella's ex-boyfriend Franco Scalo, an antiques dealer; Silvestri discovers that he is a cocaine user, and that Isabella had attempted to break his addiction.

It is revealed that Isabella kept a diary detailing the staff's personal lives and vices. One of the models, Nicole—who is Scalo's current lover—finds the diary and promises to give it to the police, but her co-worker Peggy steals it during a fashion show. That night, Nicole visits Scalo's store to supply him with cocaine where she is stalked by the murderer, who murders her with a spiked glove. The figure searches her corpse and her purse for the diary, but cannot find it. Marco, a nervous, pill-popping dresser who has unrequited feelings for Peggy, visits her at her apartment offering protection, which she politely refuses. She is then confronted and beaten by the killer, who writes a demand in a notebook for the location of the diary. She says she burned it in her fireplace because it contained details of an abortion she underwent. Enraged, the murderer knocks her unconscious. The assailant then carries her away just as Silvestri arrives, takes her to another location, ties her to a chair, and continues the interrogation. Peggy pulls off the mask and is shocked to recognize her assailant, who burns her to death using a furnace.

Silvestri surmises that the murderer is a sex maniac and is one of the men associated with the salon, so he arrests everyone he believes might be responsible. Panicking when he is identified as having visited Peggy's apartment, Marco tries to accuse Cesare, the house's eavesdropping dress designer, for the killings because of impotency; he then suffers an epileptic seizure and is hospitalised, and his drugs turn out to be medication for his condition. While the suspects are in custody, Greta, another model, finds Peggy's corpse stashed in the trunk of her car, and the killer smothers her to death in the mansion of her fiancé. Once Peggy and Greta's bodies are discovered, Silvestri releases all the men; Morlacchi retrieves the same notebook he used earlier to interrogate Peggy.

Morlacchi and Cristina later discuss their murder spree: he killed Isabella, Nicole and Peggy, and Cristiana murdered Greta to give him an alibi; the hypersexualization of the killings was merely a red herring to disguise their motivations. Isabella had found out that they had earlier murdered Christiana’s husband and tried to blackmail them.

Morlacchi convinces Cristiana that, although the diary has been destroyed, they must commit one more murder to satisfy Silvestri's hypothesis. Later that night, Cristiana kills a fifth model, making the death look like a suicide and leaving the mask, hat and coat strewn around the bathroom to his implicate the model as the murderer. Cristiana prepares to leave the apartment when she is interrupted by a loud knocking on the front door. While attempting to escape she falls from a second-story window.

At the fashion house, Morlacchi excitedly searches through Cristiana's desk for her jewelry. Cristiana enters, now realizing that Morlacchi had been responsible for her fall and that their marriage was merely a means for him to become the heir to her fortune. She kills Morlacchi. After calling Silvestri, Cristiana collapses next to Morlacchi's body.

== Cast ==
- Eva Bartok as Countess Cristiana Cuomo (Countess Christina Como in the English version)
- Cameron Mitchell as Massimo Morlacchi (Max Morlan)
- Thomas Reiner as Inspector Silvestri (Sylvester)
- Arianna Gorini as Nicole
- Mary Arden as Peggy Peyton
- Lea Krugher as Greta
- Claude Dantes as Tao-Li (Tilde)
- Dante DiPaolo as Franco Scalo (Frank Scalo)
- Massimo Righi as Marco
- Franco Ressel as Marquis Riccardo Morelli (Richard Morell)
- Luciano Pigozzi as Cesare Lazzarini (Caesar Lazar)
- Giuliano Raffaelli as Inspector Zanchin
- Francesca Ungaro as Isabella
- Harriet White Medin as Clarice
- Enzo Cerusico as Gas Station Attendant
- Heidi Stroh and Nadia Anty as Models
- Goffredo Unger as the Masked Killer (uncredited)

Credits adapted from Mario Bava: All the Colors of the Dark and the Arrow Video Blu-ray booklet.

== Background and style ==
In West Germany, a film genre called krimis — murder mystery films inspired by the works of Edgar Wallace — became popular in the early 1960s, with the first being 1959's Der Frosch mit der Maske (transl. The Frog with the Mask). These films were made initially in black and white, but were later shot in colour and received distribution in Italy. Italian film historian Stefano Baschiera spoke about their influence on Italian cinema, noting that Italian popular cinema attempted their own style of the krimi as they had done with the horror films of Hammer Film Productions and American genre films by "using their 'tested' imagery in order to satisfy the demand of a national market". Another rising trend of the early 1960s followed the success of Terence Fisher's 1958 version of Dracula in Italy. This led to the rise in popularity of pulp paperback novels, comics and photonovels in the horror, mystery and crime genres, which included elements of eroticism.

Italian film historian and critic Roberto Curti described the plot of Blood and Black Lace as being lifted from the themes of these novels, and adapting elements of the krimi, with a "mysterious villain with sadistic tendencies" who is seen in films like Karl Anton's The Avenger or Franz Josef Gottlieb's The Black Abbot. Bava had explored the elements of suspense and eroticism in the film genre that would become the giallo with The Girl Who Knew Too Much, which involved a woman who witnesses a murder and becomes the target of a serial killer, and the Black Sabbath segment "The Telephone", in which a prostitute is blackmailed while she is undressing for the night. The term giallo, which means "yellow" in Italian, is derived from Il Giallo Mondadori, a long-running series of mystery and crime novels identifiable by their distinctive uniform yellow covers, and is used in Italy to describe all mystery and thriller fiction. English-language critics use the term to describe more specific films within the genre, involving a murder mystery that revels in the details of the murder rather than the deduction of it or police procedural elements.

Bava's biographer Tim Lucas deemed The Girl Who Knew Too Much to be a tongue-in-cheek tribute to the giallo novels, while "The Telephone" is closer to what would become the traditional giallo film style, albeit in short form. Curti described Blood and Black Lace as predominantly a series of violent, erotically charged set pieces that are "increasingly elaborate and spectacular" in their construction, and that Bava pushed these elements to the extreme. Curti noted the film was promoted as a whodunnit in Italy but differed from both that genre and krimis of the period, specifically in its lack of humour or a string of clues as to the identity of the murderer.

== Production ==
=== Development ===
Prior to directing Blood and Black Lace, Mario Bava had directed several films aimed at foreign markets, including Black Sunday, Erik the Conqueror, The Girl Who Knew Too Much and Black Sabbath. These films were produced primarily through Lionello Santi's production company Galatea Film, which suspended their operations by 1964 because of financial hardship. This forced Bava to move from producer to producer for the rest of his career, which left him "not always happy with the results" according to Curti. Bava began work on Blood and Black Lace under the working title of L'atelier della morte (transl. The Fashion House of Death) for Emmepi Cinematografica, a small company founded on November 27, 1962, which had only produced four films, and had made a minor contribution to Black Sabbath; Blood and Black Lace was Emmepi's only film as a majority investor. According to ministerial papers, Bava signed the contract to work on the film on March 16, 1963.

The film had a smaller budget than Bava's previous horror films, estimated at 180 million Italian lire, of which 141.755 million was used in production; by contrast, Black Sabbath had a budget of 205 million lire. Emmepi set up the film as a co-production with France and West Germany, with the respective investment quotas being 50% (Italy), 20% (France), and 30% (West Germany). The French partner was Georges de Beauregard, who would work with productions varying from Jean-Luc Godard's Breathless and Le petit soldat (transl. The Little Soldier) to genre film co-productions like Goliath and the Rebel Slave and The Vampire of Düsseldorf. According to documents at Rome's Archive of State, De Beauregard's largest contribution to the film was the services of his press officer (and future film director) Bertrand Tavernier as an assistant director. Tavernier dismissed this, saying that, "These Italian credits are based on scams. French names were needed for the co-production. I have never been to Italy and haven't met anyone involved in these films." Tavernier concluded his contributions to the film were that he "read a scenario of Mario Bava's Blood and Black Lace and my name is in the credits". The West German partner was Top Film, working under its Monachia Film subsidiary, which was based in Munich and financed only two other films.

The synopsis of Blood and Black Lace at the Archive of State in Italy and the script at the Centro Sperimentale di Cinematografia library are credited to Marcello Fondato and Giuseppe Barillà. Fondato had previously worked on several comedies before Blood and Black Lace, and on the script for Black Sabbath. Barillà was a co-editor of the literary magazine Elsinore. Curti suggests that Barillà's contributions to the script were minor. The estimated budget attached to bureaucratic papers submitted to the Ministry at the beginning of production list Fondato and Bava as the authors of the story and credits the script to "Giuseppe Milizia", a name that does not appear in any other documents. In contrast, the opening titles of the film credit Fondato as the author of the story and screenplay, while Barillà and Bava's names are listed following "with the collaboration of". Ministerial papers state that Bava was paid 3 million lire as co-scenarist and 7 million for directing, while Fondato and Barillà were paid roughly 1.5 million each for screenwriting.

Lucas has suggested that the 1958 Swedish film Mannequin in Red may have influenced Blood and Black Lace because of its use of colour cinematography with diffused lighting filters similar to Bava's style, as well as the film's plot being set in a fashion salon where murders are taking place. Curti contests this notion because Mannequin in Red was never released in Italy, deeming it unlikely that Bava or the screenwriters ever saw it.

=== Pre-production ===
Blood and Black Lace utilised an international cast. It included Italians (Arianna Gorini, Massimo Righi, Franco Ressel, Luciano Pigozzi, Giuliano Raffaelli, Francesca Ungaro and Enzo Cerusico), Americans (Cameron Mitchell, Mary Arden, Dante DiPaolo and Harriet White Medin), Germans (Thomas Reiner, Lea Lander and Heidi Stroh), French actress Claude Dantes, and Hungarian-British actress Eva Bartok. Lander, who was credited onscreen as "Lea Krugher" due to her being a distant cousin of actor Hardy Krüger, moved to Italy to work on the film. She spoke positively on working with Bava, but was particularly excited to be working with Bartok. Bartok was known at the time for her work in Robert Siodmak's film The Crimson Pirate, and Lander recalled that Bartok kept her distance from the rest of the cast, had her own make-up room and had the cast and crew often having to wait for her on set. The cast also included some character actors, many of which who had worked with Bava previously, such as Righi, who was in Black Sabbath, DiPaolo, who played a reporter in The Girl Who Knew Too Much, Ressel, who had played supporting parts in The Wonders of Aladdin, Erik the Conqueror and The Girl Who Knew Too Much, and Pigozzi, who was in The Whip and the Body.

Reiner and Dantes were late additions to the cast, as they took over roles initially intended for Gustavo De Nardo and Yoko Tani, respectively. Reiner, a classically trained actor whose experience was primarily in West German television and voice dubbing, was impressed by Bava's working methods, believing that the lack of obligation to record direct sound on-set allowed him to film shots in imaginative ways; Reiner spent his off-set time walking Centi, Bava's pet Basset Hound, which inspired him to buy one for himself and his wife upon his return to Germany. Curti has described Dantes' replacement for Tani as "hasty", noting that despite being made-up to appear Asian in line with her scripted character, these efforts were obstructed by her strong jawline, wide cheekbones and androgynous appearance. Mitchell recalled that Dantes told him that she suffered from an eating disorder and had undergone an experimental weight loss procedure in Paris a month prior to the start of filming, whereby "they'd put you to sleep for three weeks, massage you, give you pills or injections to relax you and it would help take the weight right off"; Lucas corroborates this by noting that Dantes appeared to be "at least forty pounds heavier" in The Hyena of London, which she had filmed prior to working on Blood and Black Lace.

A regular actor for Bava, Mitchell had remained in touch with the director since their last project together, Erik the Conqueror. Mitchell stated "There was a special chemistry between us, Bava was one of my favorite people on the planet." Mitchell stated that Bava's mood on-set was genial despite hearing rumours that he had recently suffered a nervous breakdown, explaining "In this business, frankly, everybody breaks down. I think it was fairly serious with Mario, however." Medin, a recurring Bava actress who played the role of Clarice the housekeeper, did not remember anything about the production, but confessed to Lucas that she thought the film was "absolutely horrible" and that "When you get to be my age [...] violence on the screen loses whatever entertainment value it may have had when you were younger and thought of yourself as immortal and indestructible." Due to the film's status as an international co-production, the cast's revenue was not divided equally: while Mitchell (and possibly Bartok) were paid in cash at the beginning of each week of shooting, and the German actors were fully imbursed for their stay in Rome, many cast members, such as Arden, worked under the promise that they would be paid in full at the end of production, but never received their salaries.

The crew consisted of many other of Bava's regular collaborators, including director of photography Ubaldo Terzano, film editor Mario Serandrei and costume designer Tina Loriedo Grani.

=== Filming ===
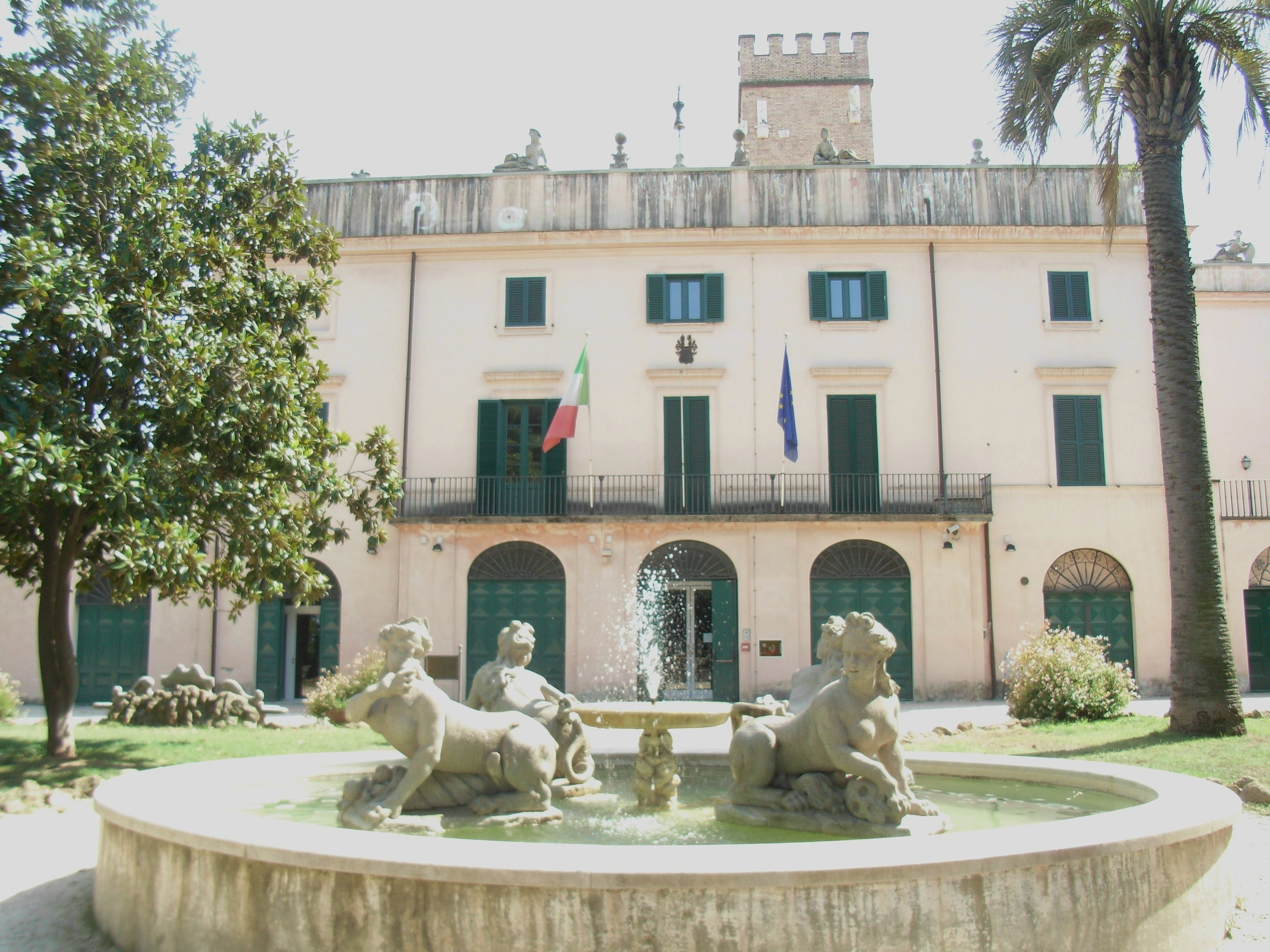
The exteriors of the Christian Haute Couture were shot at the Villa Sciarra in Rome.

Lucas stated that filming began in November 1963, while Curti found the schedule began on September 26, 1963. Arden recalled she finished her scenes around the time of the assassination of John F. Kennedy. While Lucas said that filming ended in mid-January 1964, the documents found by Curti showed that principal photography finished on October 26, 1963. The film was shot in Rome, with the exteriors of the fashion house filmed at Villa Sciarra, interiors shot at Palazzo Brancaccio, and other scenes shot at A.T.C. Studios. Scenes such as the antique shop were shot at a storage facility for film props.

Although the film was a European co-production, it was filmed with the majority of the cast speaking their lines in English to ensure international marketability. Arden spoke about the script, saying that the "Italian guy who wrote the script had no great knowledge of American or English conversation, so the script was full of mistakes". Arden was fluent in three languages and rewrote the dialogue as a favour for Bava during filming so it would make more sense. For the film's violent scenes, Arden remembered performing most of her own stunts. These included scenes where she was to fall on to a mattress that would be placed under her at the last second. The team often mistimed the move, leading to Arden being bruised on subsequent re-takes. The film's stunt coordinator, Goffredo "Freddy" Unger, explained that Bava often had to deal with actors wanting to do their own stunts. When actors requested to do fight scenes, he filmed them only briefly, before telling them he had all the footage they needed. Mitchell recalled that Bava created the film's tracking shots by mounting the camera on a children's toy wagon, while crane shots were made by using a makeshift see-saw that counterbalanced the camera with crew members. Curti has disputed the idea of a wagon being used on the film, as Lamberto Bava said on an Italian DVD audio commentary that the cameras used were Mitchells, which would have been too heavy to mount on such a device (as opposed to lighter Arriflexs).

It took four hours for makeup artist Emilio Trani to apply burned features to Arden for the sequences where she portrayed a corpse; these took five days to shoot. To avoid having the makeup added and removed each day, Arden left it on her face for the latter days of shooting; she recalled that her made-up appearance terrified her mother, who was staying with her in Rome. An accident during the filming of these sequences left Arden with a permanent scar across her nose. In the scene where Greta discovers Peggy's body in the trunk of her car, Bava instructed Lander to wait until the trunk lid was completely open (as indicated by a click in the mechanism) before jumping and recoiling backwards, as the lid used a strong spring that caused it to fall rapidly into place if it was not secured. In her nervousness, Lander failed to open the trunk fully, resulting in the lid's sharp lock hitting Arden in the face, narrowly missing her eye. Arden became hysterical, prompting Bava to stop shooting immediately and calm her down by holding ice to her face while hugging her.

=== Music ===
Carlo Rustichelli composed the film's score, as he had for Bava's previous film, The Whip and the Body. Rustichelli recalled his own reaction to the film saying, "There was no doubt, it was something new. I was somewhat shocked by it, partly by its erotic quality." The film's main theme is titled "Atelier" and is reprised throughout the film in various forms. Lucas notes that as the number of characters' deaths grows throughout the film, the orchestration of the score scales down. At Bava's behest, Rustichelli reused several cues he had written and recorded for The Whip and the Body. Rustichelli also reused a cue from the film La bellezza di Ippolita (transl. The Beauty of Hippolyta), which can be heard during the fashion show sequence.

Coinciding with the film's release, the score's publisher, C.A.M., released "Atelier" as a 45 RPM single, with an alternate version of the theme, "Defilé", as the B-side. In 2005, the year after Rustichelli's death, Digitmovies released the complete score on CD as a two-disc set along with the music from The Whip and the Body. Spikerot Records later released the score, remastered from the original session tapes, as a limited edition LP (400 copies) in October 2020.

== Release ==
Blood and Black Lace premiered in Rome on March 14, 1964. During post-production on the film, the title changed from L'atelier della morte to 6 donne per l'assassino. Both the on-screen title and ministerial papers list the film as 6 donne per l'assassino, while some promotional materials refer to it as Sei donne per l'assassino (transl. Six Women for the Killer), a title which has since been used in reviews, essays and reference books. Unidis distributed the film in Italy where Curti described it as not being a commercial success. It grossed a little over 137 million Italian lire, making it the 161st highest-grossing film on domestic release in Italy that year; Curti described the gross as not enough to spark any trends within Italian cinema, but enough for Emmepi to recoup its investment. Gloria Film released the film in West Germany on November 27, 1964 as Blutige Seide (transl. Bloody Silk) and Les Films Marbeuf distributed it in France as 6 femmes pour l'assassin, where it was released on December 30, 1964.

It was released in the United States under the title Blood and Black Lace on July 7, 1965 by the Woolner Brothers (who had previously distributed Bava's Hercules in the Haunted World) as part of a deal with Allied Artists. In contrast to the often drastic alterations made to Bava's earlier films by American International Pictures and other distributors, the US version is largely identical to its Italian counterpart, featuring only two very minor cuts in dialogue exchanges. Filmation Associates created a new title sequence for this version, which credited much of the cast and crew aside from Bava under "Americanized" pseudonyms, such as "Herman Tarzana" (Ubaldo Terzano), "Mark Suran" (Mario Serandei) and "Carl Rustic" (Carlo Rustichelli). Lucas deemed Filmation's opening titles, consisting of a montage of nude store mannequins and skulls, to be a compelling alternative to the Italian version's series of tracking shots through the fashion house where each of the key actors are portrayed as if they were mannequins. Gala Film Distributors released Blood and Black Lace in the United Kingdom on January 6, 1966, where the British Board of Film Censors gave the film an X rating after four minutes of cuts were made.

Two separate English dub tracks for the film were created: actor Mel Welles directed the original version in Rome, which featured most of the English-speaking actors, including Mitchell, Bartok and Arden, reprising their on-screen roles; Welles dubbed Reiner and several other actors. Now believed to be lost, the Woolners rejected this track for American distribution. They commissioned a second dub track that was produced under the supervision of Lou Moss in Los Angeles. Except for DiPaolo, who looped his own lines for this version, Paul Frees provided most of the male voices for the second dub, including Mitchell and Reiner's. Some adult material was toned down in the English version compared to the dialogue of the Italian dub, such as Marco declaring Cesare to be the killer because of his apparent impotence.

=== Home media ===
Blood and Black Lace was released on VHS in several countries, including Italy, France, Germany, Japan, and Spain. According to Lucas, all known VHS releases of the film were censored to varying degrees. Early American home media releases include a VHS and Betamax from Media Home Entertainment and a LaserDisc from The Roan Group. Iver Film and Nouveaux Pictures released it on VHS in the United Kingdom. In 1997, the film was set to be released by Quentin Tarantino's Rolling Thunder Pictures, a division of Miramax designed to introduce audiences to the works of low-budget filmmakers he admired. Rolling Thunder was unable to release the film because of an inability to source usable 35 mm English language elements; in a 1998 interview, Tarantino said that "people over [in Italy] just don't care. We tried to get the rights to Blood and Black Lace [...] and release it in Italian with English subtitles. We couldn't do that. It's not even about money; they don't care." VCI Video released the film twice in the United States on DVD in 2000, and again in 2005 with more bonus features. Both releases feature English and Italian audio tracks with subtitles.

Arrow Video released Blood and Black Lace on Blu-ray Disc on April 13 in the United Kingdom and April 21, 2015, in the United States. Presented with an aspect ratio of 1.66:1 in Italian and English, this release was extensively restored from the original camera negative in 2K resolution at L'Immagine Ritrovata, and graded at Deluxe Restoration in London under the supervision of Tim Lucas. The disc's special features include an audio commentary by Lucas, various original and archival video essays and interviews, the US version's title sequence (restored from a print owned by Joe Dante) and Yellow, a 2012 short film made by Ryan Haysom and Jon Britt as a tribute to the giallo genre. VCI released a Blu-ray/DVD combo pack on October 23, 2018, utilizing a different restoration of the film with a 1.85:1 aspect ratio using only the English audio track; the set includes two audio commentaries, one by film historian Kat Ellinger, the other by critics David Del Valle and C. Courtney Joyner, and the special features from VCI's earlier DVDs.

== Critical reception ==
=== Contemporary ===
Curti said that Blood and Black Lace was "barely reviewed in newspapers", and that the few critics who did acknowledged its stylistic qualities. Reviews in Europe in La Stampa noted the film was "finely photographed" and that it "dispenses thrills and emotions more by way of the director's excellent technique than with the shaky gimmicks of a clumsy script". Corriere d'Informazione found the film to be "technically remarkable, but as a spectacle it is asthmatic". Ugo Casirhagi of L'Unità felt Bava was "a fellow who has lots of fun playing with macabre elements ornaments, intermittent lighting, and changing colors" and "putting the characters to death (and with even more relish when they are elegant and sophisticated ladies) in the most hideous ways. We can not deny that, as a butcher, he has a pulse." An anonymous reviewer in Cahiers du Cinéma dismissed the film as a "riot of hideous lighting and effects as heavy as the Ritz: all of it in a jumble of objects as Ophuls, Sternberg or even Albicocco never dared to offer". Peter John Dyer, credited as "P.J.D.", in the Monthly Film Bulletin declared it as Bava's "most expensive-looking and decorative horror film to date" concluding that "if this is a very good (i.e. characteristic) example of Bava's work, it is a less good example of the murder thriller genre, being derivative, for the most part poorly acted and written, and risible in its several descents into bathos".

Outside Europe, A. H. Weiler of The New York Times found the film was a "super-gory whodunit" where characters "are dispatched in varying horrendous styles, leaving nary a lissome lovely around to model those fancy gowns. It's a waste ... but considering the obvious, ponderous plot and their acting, they deserve their bloody fate or the semi-blackout which greeted them." "Whit." of Variety summarized the film as an "okay mystery with a few chills here and there", while noting the visuals are "backgrounded by expensive sets which add a certain quality not always distinguishable in films of this sort". He declared the art direction "is tops" with colour photography to take advantage of it. The review commented on Bava's direction as setting "a grim mood never relinquished" adding the "score by [Rustichelli] maintains this atmosphere".

=== Retrospective ===
Thematically, Blood and Black Lace offers the giallo an irresolvable obsession with female violation that's simultaneously cruel and heartfelt. Here, the murders are understood to reflect a debasement that suggests a furthering of the debasement of modelling, a suggestion that's literalized by the killer's placement of the bodies in hideous poses [...] This thematic is complicated further by the identity of the killer, who reflects the fashion industry's self-loathing and self-consumption, driven by a mixture of profound self-interest and neurosis that would be enormously influential to the subgenre at large. In a giallo, a woman's worst enemy is often a woman driven to shirk the chains of status quo that shackle her.

— Chuck Bowen, Slant Magazine

From retrospective reviews, the BBC, AllMovie and Slant Magazine critics praised the film for its visual inventiveness, while noting its violence. Almar Haflidason, reviewing the film for the BBC, said that, "Through a prowling camera style and shadow-strewn baroque sets that are illuminated only by single brilliant colours, [Bava] creates a claustrophobic paranoia that seeps into the fabric of the movie and the viewer." Chuck Bowen of Slant Magazine praised the visuals and plot, noting that the film "floods the eye with stimulation, overwhelming our senses so much that the subtle and ingenious plot rushes by in a blur". He added, "The killings in Blood and Black Lace are still disturbing, yet have the vitality of pop art." Patrick Legar of AllMovie praised Bava's "visual eye and use of color, which give the film a highly unique style and look. The brilliant use of primary hues serve as visual foreshadowing throughout the picture and make repeated viewings a fascinating necessity." He noted, "the striking brutality" of the murders. "The killings are highly disturbing in their savagery -- strangling, gouging, drowning, and a torturous scalding among them". In the book The Definitive Guide to Horror Movies, James Marriott described the film as "fascinating and flamboyantly stylish" and found the scenes of eroticized violence disturbing.

Leonard Maltin's Movie Guide gives the film one and a half out of four stars, criticizing its "wooden script and performances" but complimenting Bava's direction, calling it "imaginative". Years after its release, several publications have included the film on "Best of" lists relating to horror, thriller and slasher themes by Paste Magazine, Esquire, and Slant Magazine. In 2004, one of its sequences was voted number 85 on The 100 Scariest Movie Moments by the Bravo TV network. On the review aggregator website Rotten Tomatoes, 75% of 16 critics' reviews are positive, with an average rating of 7.2/10.

== Legacy ==
The scene of Tao-Li's murder has been referenced by several filmmakers, such as Martin Scorsese, Pedro Almodóvar and Dario Argento.

Curti opined that the film did not enjoy the commercial success necessary to inspire a wave of similar works during its initial release. While some critics such as Lucas have suggested that Bava's use of colour influenced new krimi films to be shot in colour, such as Alfred Vohrer's The Hunchback of Soho, there is no documentation to suggest that the switch can be attributed to Blood and Black Lace. Italian thrillers released in the immediate wake of its release were described as either variations on themes found in Alfred Hitchcock's films, such as Assassination in Rome by Silvio Amadio, or murder mystery films such as Romano Ferrara's Crimine a due (transl. Crime for Two).

Among the few works immediately influenced by Blood and Black Lace was the fifth issue of the fumetto nero (black comic) Kriminal, which used the same plot as the film. Meanwhile, films labelled as gialli from Italy that were released in the late 1960s, such as Umberto Lenzi's films with Carroll Baker (Orgasmo, So Sweet... So Perverse and A Quiet Place to Kill) and Lucio Fulci's One on Top of the Other, focused on eroticism rather than an emulation of Bava's focus on murder scenes. It was not until the success of Dario Argento's 1970 film The Bird with the Crystal Plumage that the giallo genre started a major trend in Italian cinema. Argento's film borrows elements from Blood and Black Lace, particularly its murder scenes. Giallo films released after The Bird with the Crystal Plumage showed a stronger influence from Blood and Black Lace, such as Roberto Bianchi Montero's So Sweet, So Dead, Stelvio Massi's Five Women for the Killer, and Renato Polselli's Delirium.

The scene in the film involving the murder of Tao-Li in a bathtub was later referenced or used in other features. These include the opening scene of Pedro Almodóvar's Matador, where Eusebio Poncela's character is seen masturbating to this scene. It has been imitated in several films, including J. Lee Thompson's Happy Birthday to Me, Argento's Two Evil Eyes, and Martin Scorsese's Kundun.

== See also ==
- Cameron Mitchell filmography
- List of Italian films of 1964
- List of French films of 1964
- List of German films of the 1960s
