= Charge of the Black Lancers =

1962 film

- Directed by: Giacomo Gentilomo
- Screenplay by: Ottavio Alessi; Ernesto Gastaldi; Ugo Guerra; Luciano Martino
- Produced by: Jone Tuzi
- Starring: Mel Ferrer; Yvonne Furneaux; Letícia Román; Lorella De Luca
- Cinematography: Raffaele Masciocchi
- Music by: Mario Nascimbene
- Production companies: Royal Film; France-Cinema Productions; C.F.S. Kosutnjak
- Distributed by: Variety Distribution (Italy); Gaumont Distribution (France)
- Release date: 31 August 1962 (Italy)
- Running time: 97 minutes
- Countries: Italy; France; Yugoslavia

Charge of the Black Lancers (Italian: I lancieri neri) is a 1962 swashbuckling adventure film directed by Giacomo Gentilomo and starring Mel Ferrer, Yvonne Furneaux and Leticia Román.

== Plot ==
Sergio of Tula goes to Dubno to free Princess Mascia imprisoned by Queen Jassa, but he is instead seduced by the Queen igniting his ambition to let him commandeer her armed forces to have him seize her husband King Stephen's throne.

== Cast ==
- Mel Ferrer as Andrea
- Yvonne Furneaux as Jassa
- Leticia Román as Mascia
- Lorella De Luca as Samal
- Jean Claudio as Prince Sergio
- Annibale Ninchi as Prince Nikiev
- Franco Silva as Gamul
- Nando Tamberlani as King Stefano III
- Renato De Carmine as Polish Prince
- Arturo Dominici as Chief of Krevires
- Remo De Angelis as Official
- Mirko Ellis as Member of the Council
- Umberto Raho as Member of the Council

== Release ==
Charge of the Black Lancers was released in Italy on 31 August 1962.

== Reception ==
A review in the Monthly Film Bulletin stated that the film's story and sub-plots are "almost enough to fill three or four less exuberant action-spectacles" but was a better than average film of its genre noting its "pace, verve and panache essential for entertainment of this kind"
