= Le Mans, Shortcut to Hell =

1970 Italian film by Osvaldo Civirani

- Directed by: Osvaldo Civirani
- Written by: Tito Carpi; Osvaldo Civirani
- Starring: Lang Jeffries; Erna Schürer
- Cinematography: Walter Civirani
- Music by: Stelvio Cipriani
- Release date: 1970
- Country: Italy
- Language: Italian

Le Mans, Shortcut to Hell (Italian: Le Mans - Scorciatoia per l'inferno, also known as Summer Love) is a 1970 Italian action film directed by Osvaldo Civirani.

== Cast ==
- Lang Jeffries as John Lee Scott
- Erna Schürer as Sheila
- Maurizio Bonuglia as Dustin Rich
- Edwige Fenech as Cora
- Gaetano Imbrò as Kurt Weiss
- Franco Pesce as Agostino Bonelli

== See also ==
List of Italian films of 1970
