= Franco Ressel =

Italian actor (1925–1985)

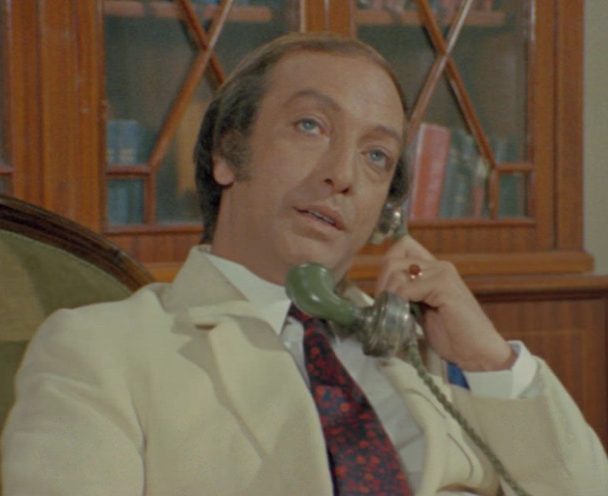
- Ressel in Il ragazzo che sorride (1969)
- Born: 8 February 1925; Naples, Italy
- Died: 30 April 1985 (aged 60); Rome, Italy
- Occupation: Actor
- Years active: 1961–1985

Franco Ressel (8 February 1925 – 30 April 1985) was an Italian film actor. He appeared in more than 120 films between 1961 and 1985.

== Selected filmography ==
- La cento chilometri (1959) – The Gay Race Walker (uncredited)
- The Assassin (1961) – Dottore Francesconi
- Rome 1585 (1961) – Grillo
- Samson and the Seven Miracles of the World (1961) – Captain of the Khan's Guards
- The Wonders of Aladdin (1961) – Vizier's Lieutenant
- Erik the Conqueror (1961) – King Lotar
- Caccia all'uomo (1961) – Capo Cameriere (uncredited)
- His Women (1961) – René
- Marco Polo (1962)
- Damon and Pythias (1962)
- Lo smemorato di Collegno (1962) – Agente Pubblicitario
- The Four Monks (1962) – Il Barone Cimino
- The Girl Who Knew Too Much (1963) – Arresting Officer at Airport (uncredited)
- The Monk of Monza (1963) – Ufficiale del balzello
- Toto and Cleopatra (1963) – (uncredited)
- Scandali nudi (1963) – Regista Pagiolini
- The Four Musketeers (1963) – Lord Buckingham
- Revenge of the Musketeers (1963)
- Toto vs. the Black Pirate (1964) – Lo sfregiato
- Blood and Black Lace (1964) – Marquis Richard Morell
- What Ever Happened to Baby Toto? (1964) – Ufficiale americano (uncredited)
- Secret of the Sphinx (1964)
- In ginocchio da te (1964) – Gian Maria
- Challenge of the Gladiator (1965)
- Hercules the Avenger (1965) – Eteocles
- Agent 077: From the Orient with Fury (1965) – Goldwyn
- Operation Atlantis (1965) – Fritz
- War Italian Style (1965) – Col. Jaeger
- In a Colt's Shadow (1965) – Jackson
- James Tont operazione U.N.O. (1965)
- The Upper Hand (1966)
- James Tont operazione D.U.E. (1966) – Jack Clifford – the spaceman
- Password: Kill Agent Gordon (1966) – Albert Kowalski / Ms. Kastiadis
- Wild, Wild Planet (1966) – Lt. Jeffries
- War of the Planets (1966) – Freddie (uncredited)
- War Between the Planets (1966) – Capt. Charles Danton
- Taste for Killing (1966) - Aarons
- Rififi in Amsterdam (1966) – Max Fischer
- El Rojo (1966) – Wallace
- Blueprint for a Massacre (1967)
- La morte viene dal pianeta Aytin (1967)
- El hombre del puño de oro (1967) – Krasna
- Assault on the State Treasure (1967) – Elias
- Tom Dollar (1967) – mr. Gaber
- Crónica de nueve meses (1967) – Juan
- Man, Pride and Vengeance (1967) – Lieutenant Pepe / Commander
- Delitto a Posillipo - Londra chiama Napoli (1967) – Peter Harriman
- Days of Fire (1968) – Passenger
- All on the Red (1968) – Reikovic
- The Last Chance (1968) – Commissioner
- Persecución hasta Valencia (1968)
- Trusting Is Good... Shooting Is Better (1968) – Mr. Hartman
- The Son of Black Eagle (1968) – General Volkonsky
- The Magnificent Tony Carrera (1968)
- The Mercenary (1968) – Studs
- Lucrezia (1968) – Ambasciatore d'Aragona
- L'amore è come il sole (1969)
- Zorro in the Court of England (1969) – Lord Percy Moore
- Il ragazzo che sorride (1969) – Mine owner
- Un corpo caldo per l'inferno (1969) – Mr. Wilkins
- Nel labirinto del sesso (Psichidion) (1969) – Fetishist
- Tarzana, the Wild Girl (1969) – Groder
- Sabata (1969) – Stengel
- Madame Bovary (1969) – Adolphe Lheureus
- Rangers: attacco ora X (1970) – Captain Köhler
- Formula 1: Nell'Inferno del Grand Prix (1970) – Frank Donovan
- Sartana in the Valley of Death (1970) – Norton
- Mr. Superinvisible (1970)
- Have a Good Funeral, My Friend... Sartana Will Pay (1970) - Samuel Piggot
- Lady Caliph (1970) – Un industriale
- Stanza 17-17 palazzo delle tasse, ufficio imposte (1971) – Gay at Railway Station (uncredited)
- Trafic (1971)
- The Deadly Trap (1971)
- Oasis of Fear (1971) – Man That Buys Aural Porn (uncredited)
- Cross Current (1971) – Tommy Brown
- They Call Him Cemetery (1971) – Judge
- Trinity Is Still My Name (1971) – Maitre D'
- Il sergente Klems (1971) – Lieutenant Dupleix
- The Devil with Seven Faces (1971) – Inspector Rinker
- The Beasts (1971) – Attorney (segment "Processo a porte chiuse")
- The Valachi Papers (1972) – (uncredited)
- Eye in the Labyrinth (1972) – Eugene
- Naked Girl Killed in the Park (1972) – Bruno – the butler (uncredited)
- Two Sons of Trinity (1972) – Alex Armstrong, '4 assi'
- A.A.A. Massaggiatrice bella presenza offresi... (1972) – D'Angelo
- Where the Bullets Fly (1972)
- Treasure Island (1972) – Sgt. Dance (uncredited)
- Seven Deaths in the Cat's Eye (1973) – Priest
- The Inconsolable Widow Thanks All Those Who Consoled Her (1973) – l'avvocato di Caterina
- The Off-Road Girl (1973) – Piero Badani
- Mr. Hercules Against Karate (1973) – Assistant to Site Administrator
- Bad Kids of the West (1973) – Wilson
- Long Lasting Days (1973) – The Doctor
- The Sinful Nuns of Saint Valentine (1974) – Don Alonso – Lucita's father
- Silence the Witness (1974) – L'ingegner Aldo Marchetti
- L'eredità dello zio buonanima (1974) – L'architetto
- Manone il ladrone (1974) – Avvocato
- Cagliostro (1975) – Morandi, News editor
- Il pavone nero (1975) – Kluger / engineer
- Calling All Police Cars (1975) – Gynaecologist
- La polizia interviene: ordine di uccidere! (1975) – Lombardi's Lawyer
- L'arbre de Guernica (1975) – Onesimo
- Povero Cristo (1975) – Pregiudicato
- Nick the Sting (1976) – Jeweller Parker
- Per amore (1976) – The Doctor in Geneva
- Fear in the City (1976) – Lo Cascio
- La malavita attacca... la polizia risponde! (1976) – Franco
- California (1977) – Full
- Bobby Deerfield (1977) – Man With Dog
- Nazis dans le rétro (1977) – Général Keitel
- Un amore così fragile, così violento (1978) – Maresciallo
- Fearless (1978) – Dr. Zimmer
- The Perfect Crime (1978) – Sgt. Phillips
- Scherzi da prete (1978) – Il direttore del giornale
- L'inquilina del piano di sopra (1978)
- Star Odyssey (1979) – Cmdr. Barr
- Inchon (1981) – Officer Aboard Mt. McKinley (uncredited)
- Panic (1982) – Mr. Milton
- Il conte Tacchia (1982)
- And the Ship Sails On (1983) – Il medico (uncredited)
- Petomaniac (1983) – Guglielmo II°
- A tu per tu (1984) – Notary
