= Two Sons of Trinity =

- Italian theatrical release poster
- Directed by: Osvaldo Civirani
- Written by: Osvaldo Civirani
- Based on: They Call Me Trinity by Enzo Barboni
- Produced by: Robert Paget
- Starring: Franco Franchi; Ciccio Ingrassia
- Cinematography: Walter Civirani
- Music by: Sante Maria Romitelli
- Release date: 1972
- Language: Italian

Two Sons of Trinity (Italian: I due figli dei Trinità) is a 1972 Italian Western-comedy film written and directed by Osvaldo Civirani and starring the comic duo Franco and Ciccio. The film features Anna Degli Uberti as Calamity Jane, Claudio Ruffini as Sabata, and Pietro Torrisi as Sartana.

== Plot summary ==
Franco and Ciccio are two cousins who open a service station in the old West where they wash, and dry the horses for passing riders. They also open a bar for the passing riders as well.

== Cast ==
- Franco Franchi as Franco Trinità
- Ciccio Ingrassia as Ciccio Trinità
- Anna Degli Uberti as Calamity Jane
- Lucretia Love as Lola
- Franco Ressel as Armstrong
- Goffredo Unger as Father Superior
- Angelo Susani as Chun Chin Champa
- Fortunato Arena as Jack Gordon
- Artemio Antonini as Friar
- Bruno Arié as Ringo
- Remo Capitani as Requiem
- Gilberto Galimberti as Friar
- Fulvio Pellegrino as Roger
- Osiride Pevarello as Chun Chin Champa's Henchman
- Claudio Ruffini as Sabata
- Pietro Torrisi as Sartana

== See also ==
- List of Italian films of 1972
