= Son of Django =

- Directed by: Osvaldo Civirani
- Cinematography: Osvaldo Civirani
- Music by: Piero Umiliani
- Release date: 1967
- Language: Italian

Son of Django (Italian: Il figlio di Django, also known as Vengeance Is a Colt 45 and Return of Django) is a 1967 Italian Spaghetti Western film written and directed by Osvaldo Civirani.

== Plot ==
When he was a child, Jeff Tracey's father, Django, was murdered by an unknown assailant. A now adult Tracey has become a gunslinger searching for the killer. After his horse is stolen, Tracey arrives in the territory of Topeka, where rival ranchers Thompson and Clay Ferguson compete for control of the area. Tracey is imprisoned after killing three of Clay's men. Tracey escapes jail with the aid of his cellmate, a Frenchman known as Four Aces, and Logan, both of whom work for Thompson. They offer Tracey a job, but he distrusts Thompson, believing that he played a role in Django's murder.

Tracey aids Four Aces and Logan in defending pro-Thompson rancher Joe Grayson when he is assaulted by Clay henchmen. Tracey meets the preacher Gus Fleming, who explains he saved Tracey after his father was killed. The territorial conflict proceeds to escalate, with Clay sending men to burn down several Thompson ranches, including one belonging to Grayson. Clay later kills Grayson when he confronts the boss in his saloon.

Grayson's wife, Jane, attempts to avenge her husband, but Clay accidentally kills her. Tracey learns Clay was responsible for killing his father, and ignores Fleming's attempts to dissuade him from seeking vengeance. Tracey attempts to confront Clay only to be ambushed and tortured. Fleming intervenes and saves Tracey, only for Tracey to knock him out so he can continue his quest for vengeance undisturbed.

Clay heavily fortifies his saloon, expecting Tracey to arrive soon. Tracey breaks into the saloon and a gunfight erupts. Fleming returns to town and intercepts a large Clay posse. When informed of the fighting, Thompson sends word to his men and then joins Fleming. With his henchmen overpowered, Clay absconds with the money, killing Thompson's traitorous lieutenant Mack in the process.

Tracey pursues Clay, finding him already captured and tied up by Fleming, Thompson, and his men. Tracey shoots Clay's ropes, then shares one last look with Fleming before departing.

== Cast ==
- Guy Madison as Father Gus Fleming
- Gabriele Tinti as Jeff Tracey
- Ingrid Schöller as Jane Grayson
- Daniele Vargas as Clay Ferguson
- Pedro Sanchez as Thompson
- Ivan Scratt as "Four Aces"
- Andrea Scotti as Coward Sheriff
- Renato Mambor as Clint Sullivan
- Bob Messenger as Logan
- Christl Penz as Saloon Singer
- Luis Chavarro as "Eyepatch"
- Franco Gulà as Hotel Clerk
- Lucio De Santis as "Hurricane", Henchman
- Luciano Rossi as Mack
- John Bartha as Sheriff
- Giuseppe Castellano as Bill
- Giorgio Dionisio as Joe Grayson
- Piero Morgia as Ferguson's Right Hand
- Remo Capitani as Thompson Henchman
- Carol Danell as Carol, Saloon Singer
- Alberigo Donadeo as Townsman
- Rocco Lerro as Ferguson Henchman
- Osiride Pevarello as "Bum", Eyepatch Henchman
- Attilio Severini as Ferguson Henchman
- Franco Ukmar as Ferguson Henchman
- The Wilder Brothers as Musicians
