= Dante DiPaolo =

American dancer and actor (1926-2013)

- Born: Dante Cesare DiPaolo; February 18, 1926; Frederick, Colorado, U.S.
- Died: September 4, 2013 (aged 87); Los Angeles, California, U.S.
- Other name: Dante De Paulo; Dante D' Paulo; Dante Di Paola
- Occupations: Dancer, actor
- Spouse: Rosemary Clooney (m. 1997; died 2002)
- Children: Miguel Ferrer (step-son)
- Relatives: Nick Clooney (brother-in-law); George Clooney (nephew); Debby Boone (daughter-in-law)

Dante Cesare DiPaolo (February 18, 1926 – September 4, 2013) was an American dancer and actor.

== Life and career ==
The son of an immigrant miner from Italy, DiPaolo started his career as a dancer when he was a child; he was nicknamed "the whirlwind of Colorado." At 13, he appeared opposite Bing Crosby in The Star Maker, his first small film role; in 1945 he appeared with Judy Garland in Ziegfeld Follies. His first credited film role was in Seven Brides for Seven Brothers, as Matt the townsman. From 1948 to 1950, he played in various Broadway shows. He was a featured performer in the revue Along Fifth Avenue.

In the 1950s he worked as a dancer, mainly in Las Vegas, and married a showgirl. The couple moved to Europe and for several years lived in Rome during the "Hollywood on the Tiber" era, where DiPaolo continued acting in films. He notably starred in two horror films directed by Mario Bava; in The Girl Who Knew Too Much (1963) and Blood and Black Lace (1964). At the end of the decade, he returned to the United States and played a supporting role in Bob Fosse's Sweet Charity (1969). From 1971 to 1973, he understudied on the national tour of No, No, Nanette.

He largely retired from acting in the 1970s, though he played a fictionalized version of himself on the 2005 comedy series Unscripted.

== Personal life ==
By 1973, DiPaolo was divorced and became romantically involved with singer Rosemary Clooney, whom he met in Hollywood during the late 1940s. The two married in November 1997. and the marriage lasted until the death of Clooney in 2002.

Sometimes, he was credited under the names Dante De Paulo, Dante D' Paulo, and Dante Di Paola.

=== Death ===
On September 4, 2013, DiPaolo died of pneumonia in Los Angeles at the age of 87.

== Filmography ==
=== Film ===
Year	Title	Role	Notes
1939	The Star Maker	Turkey	Uncredited
1944	Chip Off the Old Block	Member of The Jivin' Jacks & Jills	Uncredited
1944	The Three Caballeros	Brazilian Dancer	Uncredited
1945	Rhapsody in Blue	"Blue Monday" Dancer	Uncredited
1945	Ziegfeld Follies	Chorus Boy	Uncredited
1948	The Pirate	Dancer	Uncredited
1948	Easter Parade	Dancer	Uncredited
1948	Bodyguard	Man in Police Station	Uncredited
1953	Meet Me at the Fair	Blackface Dancer	Uncredited
1953	Call Me Madam	"The Ocarina" Dancer	Uncredited
1953	Abbott and Costello Meet Dr. Jekyll and Mr. Hyde	Specialty Dancer	Uncredited
1954	Red Garters	Dancing Townsman	Uncredited
1954	Seven Brides for Seven Brothers	Matt	
1956	Cha-Cha-Cha Boom!	Elvarez	
1961	Atlas in the Land of the Cyclops	Ifito	
1961	The Story of Joseph and His Brethren	Simeon	
1961	Samson and the Seven Miracles of the World	Bayan	
1962	Pontius Pilate	Simon	
1962	Venus Against the Son of Hercules	Frixos	
1962	Carmen di Trastevere	Tom	
1963	The Girl Who Knew Too Much	Andrea Landini	
1964	Blood and Black Lace	Franco Scalo	
1969	Sweet Charity	Charlie	

=== Television ===
Year	Title	Role	Notes
1955	The Loretta Young Show	Dancer	1 episode
1955	Allen in Movieland	—N/a	Special; As choreographer
1959	The Bob Hope Show	—N/a	1 episode As choreographer
1967	The Wild Wild West	Jeff Smith	1 episode
2005	Unscripted	Dante	3 episodes

== Partial stage credits ==
Year	Title	Role	Venue	Notes
1948	Heaven on Earth	Dancer	New Century Theatre, New York City	
1949	Along Fifth Avenue	Performer	Broadhurst Theatre, New York City	Revue
1949	Along Fifth Avenue	Performer	Imperial Theatre, New York City	Revue
1949-50	Texas, Li'l Darlin'	Amos Hall, Cowboy	Mark Hellinger Theatre, New York City	
1971-73	No, No, Nanette	Billy Early (understudy)	US tour	
