= In a Colt's Shadow =

1965 film

- Italian film poster
- Directed by: Gianni Grimaldi
- Screenplay by: Gianni Grimaldi
- Story by: Aldo Barni; Aldo Luxardo
- Produced by: Vincenzo Genesi
- Starring: Stephen Forsyth; Conrado San Martín; Anna Maria Polani; Eugenio Galadini
- Cinematography: Stelvio Massi
- Edited by: Franco Fraticelli
- Music by: Nico Fidenco
- Production companies: Hercules Cinematografica; Hispamer Films
- Distributed by: Warner Bros.
- Release date: 10 December 1965
- Running time: 82 minutes
- Countries: Italy; Spain

In a Colt's Shadow (Italian: All'ombra di una colt) is a 1965 Italian Spaghetti Western film directed and written by Giovanni Grimaldi.

== Story ==
Two professional gunfighters separate after they complete a job in a small Mexican town where they rid it of the Ramirez gang. Steve married Duke's daughter and tries to settle down to a peaceful life on a ranch outside a town controlled by Jackson and Burns.

== Cast ==
- Stephen Forsyth - Steve Blaine
- Conrado San Martín - Duke Buchanan
- Anna Maria Polani - Susan Buchanan
- Helga Liné - Fabienne
- Franco Ressel - Harold Jackson
- Virigilio Gazzolo - Buck
- Aldo Sambrell - Ramirez
- José Calvo - Sheriff
- Andrea Scotti - Oliver
- Gino Cassani - Jim
- Franco Lauteri - Burns
- Tito García - Bartender
- José Rosello
- Xan das Bolas
- Javier de Rivera
- Rafael Albaicín
- Hugo Blanco
- Sancho Gracia
- Hugo Ricardo
- Alvaro de Luna
