= Venus Against the Son of Hercules =

- Directed by: Marcello Baldi
- Screenplay by: Marcello Baldi; Sandro Continenza
- Story by: Ernesto Gastaldi; Ugo Guerra
- Starring: Roger Browne; Jocelyn Lane; Linda Sini; Dante DiPaolo
- Cinematography: Marcello Masciocchi
- Edited by: Maurizio Lucidi
- Production companies: Galatea Film; Incei Film; SpA Cinematografica
- Release date: 24 June 1962 (Italy)
- Running time: 98 minutes
- Country: Italy

Venus Against the Son of Hercules (Italian: Marte, dio della guerra, also known as Mars, God of War and The Son of Hercules vs. Venus) is a 1962 Italian peplum film written and directed by Marcello Baldi and starring Roger Browne and Jackie Lane.

In the films, the god Mars descends from Mount Olympus to defend a kingdom against an invasion led by an African warlord Afros. Meanwhile, a courtier conspires to cease the throne by marrying a princess and making a deal with the warlord.

== Plot ==
Mars descends from Mount Olympus to planet Earth to defend a kingdom besieged by invaders led by an African warlord named Afros. The warlord threatens to destroy the kingdom's capital unless they surrender. Antarus, a corrupt and ambitious courtier conspires to become king. His plans include a deal with Afros and marrying Ecuba, daughter of the king. He is distracted by the beautiful maiden Daphne, whose father the king's emissary was recently killed by Afros during the midst of a parley. Afros is killed in a duel with Mars and his army is scattered during a siege. Antarus continues his plot to become king while maneuvering his pawns in court.

Mars rescues Daphne from a couple of Afros' men during her attempt to recover her father's body on the roadside. After falling in love at first sight with Daphne, Mars reluctantly returns to Olympus to reunite with Venus, who he accuses of deceiving him to look like Daphne on earth. Venus releases Ares, explaining her beauty and grace exists in all mortal women including Daphne who she recognizes Mars is profoundly in love with. He returns to earth in time to learn that Daphne has been condemned to be sacrificed to a carnivorous plant monster alongside a deaf-mute slave girl accused of murdering Ecuba (who was killed by Antarus). Mars arrives with heroic timing to save the women from sacrifice but Daphne is fatally shot with an arrow by Antarus who followed after Mars to kill him. The two fight and Antarus is subsequently cornered and devoured by the monstrous plant. Recognizing Mars' eternal love for Daphne, Jupiter answers his son's prayer and spares her life as she appears waiting in a white chariot. Mars joins her and bids farewell to the king and his people who arrived at the sacrificial site in time to see the pair ride off into the heavens presumably to live on Mount Olympus forever.

== Cast ==
- Roger Browne as Mars
- Jackie Lane as Daphne
- Massimo Serato as Antarus
- Linda Sini as Ecuba
- Dante Di Paolo as Frixos
- Renato Speziali
- Michèle Bailly as Venus
- John Kitzmiller as Afros
- Giuseppe Addobbati
- Renato Navarrini
- Folco Lulli
- Corrado Annicelli
- Aldo Bufi Landi
- Giulio Donnini
- Livio Lorenzon
- Gianni Solaro

== Release ==
Venus Against the Son of Hercules was released in Italy on 24 June 1962. The film was also released as The Son of Hercules vs. Venus and Mars, God of War.
