= Trusting Is Good... Shooting Is Better =

- Directed by: Osvaldo Civirani
- Cinematography: Osvaldo Civirani
- Music by: Angelo Francesco Lavagnino
- Release date: 1968
- Language: Italian

Trusting Is Good... Shooting Is Better (Italian: T'ammazzo!... Raccomandati a Dio, also known as Dead for a Dollar and I'll Kill You, and Recommend You to God) is a 1968 Italian Spaghetti Western film written and directed by Osvaldo Civirani.

== Cast ==
- George Hilton: Glenn Reno
- John Ireland: The Colonel
- Sandra Milo: Liz
- Piero Vida: The Portuguese
- Gordon Mitchell: Roy Fulton
- Franco Ressel: Hartmann
- Mimmo Palmara: Nick (credited as Dick Palmer)
- Andrea Scotti: Higgins
