= Sancho Gracia =

Spanish actor (1936–2012)

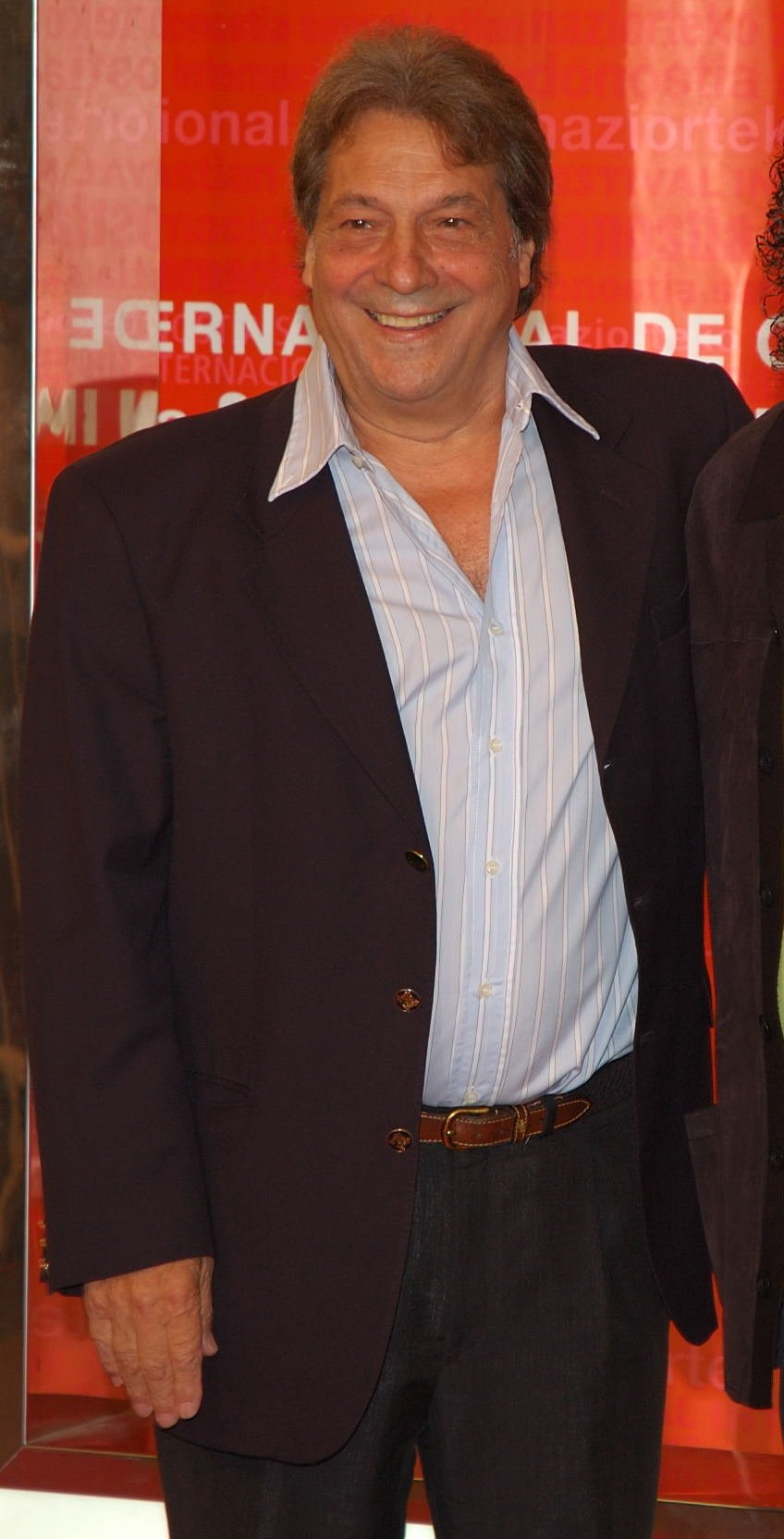
- Gracia at the San Sebastián International Film Festival in 2005
- Born: Félix Ángel Sancho Gracia; 27 September 1936; Madrid, Spain
- Died: 8 August 2012 (aged 75); Madrid, Spain
- Occupation: Actor
- Years active: 1962–2012
- Spouse: Noelia Aguirre (m. 1969–2012)
- Children: 3 (including Rodolfo)

Félix Ángel Sancho Gracia (27 September 1936 – 8 August 2012) was a Spanish motion picture and television actor.

== Career ==
Born in Madrid, Gracia started his acting career in Montevideo, Uruguay, where he lived from 1947 until 1961. In Uruguay he was a student of Margarita Xirgu at the Multidisciplinary School of Dramatic Art. He made his movie acting debut in France in the 1963 film L'Autre femme opposite Annie Girardot. Since then he has appeared in more than eighty motion pictures including several Hollywood productions during the 1970s and in 1999's Outlaw Justice with Willie Nelson and Kris Kristofferson. Gracia also worked in Australia, performing as a regular cast member in the 1982 television series Runaway Island and in the 1991 made-for-TV film Pirates Island. He also participated in the Oscar-nominated Mexican film The Crime of Padre Amaro (2002).

In 2003, he was nominated for the Goya Award for Best Actor for his performance in the 2002 film 800 Bullets.

In addition to motion pictures, Sancho Gracia made more than sixty guest appearances on Spanish television shows. He became famous in Spain for the role of Curro Jiménez, in the Televisión Española drama series of the same name, that was broadcast from 1976 to 1979, being rebroadcast several times since then.

== Personal life ==
In 1969, Sancho Gracia married Noelia Aguirre Gomensoro, the daughter of an Uruguayan National Party politician, with whom he had three children, including Rodolfo.

During the shooting of the film 100 Rifles in Spain in 1968, Gracia had an affair with American actress Raquel Welch, who at the time was married to producer Patrick Curtis. Welch's husband, upon finding out about the affair, chased Gracia at gunpoint through the hotel where they were staying in Aguadulce.

=== Death ===
Sancho Gracia died of lung cancer on 8 August 2012 in Madrid.

== Selected filmography ==
- Vampiresas 1930 (1962) – Negra de la orquesta
- A Nearly Decent Girl (1963) – Amigote de Carlos
- L'autre femme (1964)
- Murieta (1965) – Bandido de Murrieta (uncredited)
- El Zorro cabalga otra vez (1965) – Juan
- Sheriff Won't Shoot (1965) – Sam, Handsome Bandit
- In a Colt's Shadow (1965) – Saloon Gunslinger (uncredited)
- Operation Poker (1965) – John Parker
- La ciudad no es para mí (1966) – Dr. Ricardo Torres
- He's My Man! (1966) – Jefe banda Sing-Sing
- Los duendes de Andalucía (1966) – Simon Legrand
- Per il gusto di uccidere (1966) – Bill Kilpatrick
- Las viudas (1966) – Joven seductor (segment "El Aniversario")
- Fray Torero (1966) – Antonio
- Road to Rocío (1966) – Médico
- Savage Pampas (1966) – Carlos
- Espi... ando (1966)
- ¿Qué hacemos con los hijos? (1967) – José
- Django Kill... If You Live, Shoot! (1967) – Willy
- Club de solteros (1967) – Tomás
- Run Like a Thief (1967) – Wes
- The House of 1,000 Dolls (1967) – Fernando
- La chica de los anuncios (1968) – Teddy
- Honeymoon with a Stranger (1969) - Sergeant (ABC Movie of the Week)
- 100 Rifles (1969) – Mexican Leader (uncredited)
- Guns of the Magnificent Seven (1969) – Miguel
- Simón Bolívar (1969) – Cardona
- El último día de la guerra (1970) – Pvt. Martínez
- Rain for a Dusty Summer (1971) – Humberto Pro
- Antony and Cleopatra (1972) – Canidius
- The Call of the Wild (1972) – Taglish Charlie
- El espectro del terror (1973) – Doctor
- Dick Turpin (1974) – Richard
- País S.A. (1975) – Actores invitados
- Guerreras verdes (1976) – Sargento Saez
- Avisa a Curro Jiménez (1978) – Curro Jiménez
- Él y él (1980) – Alberto
- Marbella, un golpe de cinco estrellas (1985) – Police Inspector Vargas
- The Witching Hour (1985) – Rubén Blázquez y Delgado de Aguilera
- De tripas corazón (1985) – Arturo
- Freckled Max and the Spooks (1987) – Prokurator
- Gallego (1988)
- Love, Hate and Death (1989) – Antonio Montoya
- Tango (1991) – Marcos
- Huidos (1993) – Juan
- Tocando fondo (1993) – Bartolo
- Cachito (1996) – Rafael
- Martín (hache) (1997) – José M.ª Navarro
- The Naked Eye (1998) – Ignacio
- Dying of Laughter (1999) – Legionario brutal
- Inferno (1999) – Muñoz
- A galope tendido (2000) – Tío Boni
- La comunidad (2000) – Castro
- No te fallaré (2001) – Sandro
- ¡Hasta aquí hemos llegado! (2002) – Lago
- The Crime of Father Amaro (2002) – Padre Benito Díaz
- Box 507 (2002) – Santos Guijuelo
- El robo más grande jamás contado (2002) – Fernando Baeza "Garganta Profunda"
- 800 Bullets (2002) – Julián
- El oro de Moscú (2003) – Teniente de la Guardia Civil
- El furgón (2003) – El Manco
- El Cid: The Legend (2003) – Gormaz (voice)
- Love by Mistake (2004) – Manolo
- Mala uva (2004) – César
- R2 y el caso del cadáver sin cabeza (2005) – Inspector jefe
- Bailando chachacha (2005)
- La bicicleta (2006) – Mario
- Los managers (2006) – Josete
- Donkey Xote (2007) – Sansón Carrasco / Siniestro (voice)
- Barreiros, motor humano (2008) – (voice)
- 7 pasos y medio (2009) – Antonio
- The Last Circus (2010) – Coronel Salcedo
- Entrelobos (2010) – Atanasio
