= Roger Browne =

American actor (1930–2024)

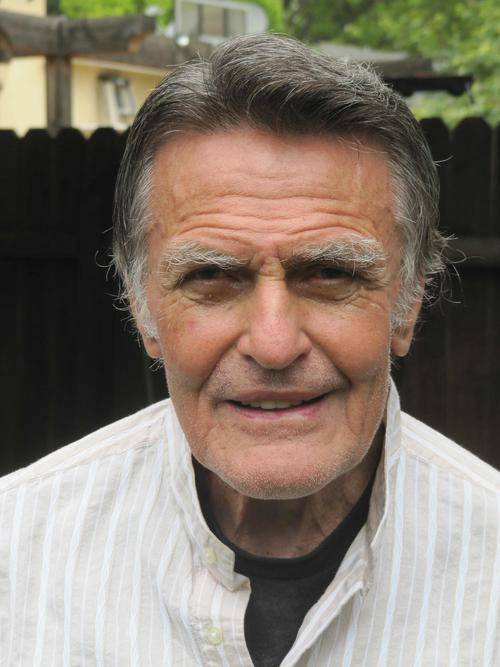
- Browne in 2012
- Born: April 13, 1930; Cincinnati, Ohio, U.S.
- Died: October 11, 2024 (aged 94); Burbank, California, U.S.
- Occupation: Actor
- Years active: 1960–2020

Roger Browne Jr. (April 13, 1930 – October 11, 2024) was an American actor, best known for his work in Italian cinema. He was a star of peplum and Eurospy films popular in Europe during the 1960s and 1970s. Browne was best known as the title role in the 1967 film Argoman the Fantastic Superman.

== Early life ==
Browne was born in Cincinnati, Ohio, on April 13, 1930. He enrolled in pilot training while serving in the U.S. Air Force, flying the AT-6 trainer aircraft. Browne completed 64 hours of training, including 20 hours of solo flight but was unable to finish due to airsickness and related symptoms of Manifestations of Apprehension (MOA).

== Career ==
In a telephone interview with Monster Kid Radio, Browne said that while he was studying acting and getting bit roles, he supported himself as a physical therapist. One of his clients was going to Rome and asked Roger if he would come with him to carry on his work. As the 1960 Summer Olympics were under way, Roger eagerly accepted the offer. He remained in Europe where he was discovered and offered a role in the Jayne Mansfield film It Happened in Athens. Upon his return to Rome, Browne was asked to appear as Mars in Vulcan, Son of Giove and repeated his role in the film Mars, God of War. With the decline of the sword and sandal genre Browne moved into the Eurospy genre.

Browne lived in Rome from 1960 to 1980 and made films throughout Europe. He had roles in more than 30 films and television shows. During his time in Rome, he became frequently involved with the English Language Dubbers Association of Rome (ELDA), at one point the leading English dubbing group in Europe. He witnessed the organization’s growth into becoming more professional, and in 1966 succeeded Tony Russel as president. ELDA were still an “unofficial” company, however, and suffered from lack of tax and income being paid, including an incident where Browne was robbed while delivering payroll. Deciding to finally become “official”, ELDA became Associated Recording Artists (ARA) in the 1970s.

Browne worked with Franco Nero, Sophia Loren, Luciano Salce, Anthony Quinn, Vittorio Gassman, Ernest Borgnine, Rita Tushingham, Richard Lester, the Taviani Brothers, Yoko Tani, Gordon Mitchell, Charlie Fawcett, and Jayne Mansfield. He is best remembered for his role in Argoman the Fantastic Superman (also known as The Incredible Paris Incident and Come rubare la corona d'Inghilterra), 1967.

He also appeared as himself in the Fine Brothers Elders React YouTube series.

== Death ==
Browne died after a short illness in Burbank, California, on October 11, 2024, at the age of 94.

== Partial filmography ==
- 13 Fighting Men (1960) – Pvt. Connors (uncredited)
- Heroes Die Young (1960) – Mule
- Barabbas (1961) – Gladiator (uncredited)
- Pontius Pilate (1962) – Minor Role
- Vulcan, Son of Giove (1962) – Mars – God of War
- Mars, God of War (1962) – Mars
- The Ten Gladiators (a.k.a. I dieci gladiatori) (1963) – Glaucus Valerius
- Seven Slaves Against the World (a.k.a. Gli schiavi più forti del mondo) (1964) – Marcus
- The Revenge of Spartacus (a.k.a. La vendetta di Spartacus) (1964) – Valerio
- Three Swords for Rome (1964) – Fabio
- Revenge of the Gladiators (1964)
- Seven Rebel Gladiators (a.k.a. Sette contro tutti) (1965) – Marcus Aulus
- Super Seven Calling Cairo (a.k.a. Superseven chiama Cairo) (1965) – Martin Stevens / Superseven
- Operation Poker (a.k.a. Operazione poker) (1965) – Glenn Foster
- Password: Kill Agent Gordon (1966) – Douglas Gordon
- The Spy Who Loved Flowers (1966) – Martin Stevens
- Rififi in Amsterdam (1966) – Rex Monroe
- Un milione di dollari per sette assassini (a.k.a. Last Man to Kill) (1966) – Michael King
- Argoman the Fantastic Superman (aka The Incredible Paris Incident) (1967) – Sir Reginald Hoover / Argoman
- Assault on the State Treasure (a.k.a. Assalto al tesoro di stato) (1967) – Johnny Quick
- È stato bello amarti (1968)
- Samoa, Queen of the Jungle (a.k.a. Samoa, regina della giungla) (1968) – Clint Loman
- One Day, My Daddy (a.k.a. It Was Nice Loving You) (1968)
- Patton (1970) – Soldier on Bridge (uncredited)
- Jungle Master (1972) – Lord Carter
- The Black Hand (a.k.a. La Mano Nera (Prima della mafia, più della mafia)) (1973) – State Attorney
- Women in Cell Block 7 (1973) – Inspector Weil
- Mahogany (1975) – Ad Agency Executive
- The Big Operator (1976) – James (uncredited)
- Emanuelle in America (1977) – The Senator
- War of the Robots (1978) – Cmdr. King (uncredited)
- Backwards ... March! (a.k.a. Riavanti ... Marsch!) (1979) – General Thompson
- Do It with the Pamango (1980) – Harry Brakson
- Killer Looks (2018) – Creepy Old Man
- The Lone Road (2020) – Dad
