= La vendetta di Spartacus =

- Directed by: Michele Lupo
- Screenplay by: Lionello De Felice; Ernesto Guida; Ernesto Gastaldi
- Produced by: Elio Scardamaglia
- Cinematography: Guglielmo Mancori
- Edited by: Alberto Gallitti
- Music by: Francesco De Masi
- Production company: Leone Film
- Release date: September 24, 1964 (Italy)
- Running time: 105 minutes
- Country: Italy

La vendetta di Spartacus (lit. 'The revenge of Spartacus') is a 1964 Italian film directed by Michele Lupo. It was one of a number of Italian productions that was released as an unofficial sequel to Stanley Kubrick's Spartacus (1960).

It was released in the United States as Revenge of the Gladiators.

== Plot ==
Arminio and Trasone do believe that the legendary Spartacus is still alive and has organized a group of armed men to destroy the Romans. Valerio, a Roman legionary, discovers the deception and attempts to warn those who believe in the false news. The attempt is unsuccessful. After killing the two Spartacists, Valerio and his followers fought against the remaining forces of Arminius, defeating them after a bitter battle.

== Cast ==
- Roger Browne as Valerio
- Scilla Gabel as Cinzia
- Giacomo Rossi-Stuart as Fulvius
- Daniele Vargas as Lucius Transone
- Germano Longo as Marcellus
- Gianni Solaro
- Franco Di Trocchio
- Gian Paolo Rosmino (as Giampaolo Rosmino)
- Alfio Caltabiano
- Pietro Ceccarelli
- Pietro Marascalchi
- Mario Novelli
- Nello Pazzafini (as Giovanni Pazzafini)
- Calisto Calisti
- Antonio Corevi
- Gordon Mitchell (as Arminius)

== Development ==
Martin M. Winkler described it as one of several Italian films inspired by and cashing in on the popularity of Stanley Kubrick's Spartacus (1960). It was one of the unofficial sequels made to the film along with Sergio Corbucci's Il figlio di Spartacus.

It was developed by Leone Film in Italy. It was shot back to back with Seven Slaves Against the World.

== Release ==
La vendetta di Spartacus was released in Italy on September 24, 1964. It was released in the United States, opening in Detroit on September 29, 1965.

== Notes ==
=== Sources ===
- Curti, Roberto (2017). Riccardo Freda: The Life and Works of a Born Filmmaker. McFarland & Company. ISBN 978-1476628387.
- Kinnard, Roy; Crnkovich, Tony (2017). Italian Sword and Sandal Films, 1908-1990. McFarland & Company. ISBN 978-1476662916.
- Krafsur, Richard P., ed. (1976). The American Film Institute Catalog: Feature Films 1961-1970. Vol. F6. R.R. Bowker Company. ISBN 0-8352-0440-5.
- Winkler, Martin M., ed. (2007). "List of Plates". Spartacus: Film and History. Blackwell Publishing. ISBN 978-1-4051-3180-3.
