= Seven Slaves Against the World =

Gli schiavi più forti del mondo (Seven Slaves Against the World)
- Theatrical release poster in the United States
- Directed by: Michele Lupo
- Written by: Roberto Gianviti; Michele Lupo
- Produced by: Elio Scardamaglia
- Starring: Roger Browne; Gordon Mitchell; Arnaldo Fabrizio
- Cinematography: Guglielmo Mancori
- Music by: Francesco De Masi
- Production company: Leone Film
- Distributed by: Paramount Pictures (within the United States)
- Release dates: August 28, 1964 (Italy); August 18, 1965 (United States)
- Running time: 96 min (United States); 85 min (France)
- Country: Italy
- Language: Italian

Seven Slaves Against the World (Italian: Gli schiavi più forti del mondo; also known as Seven Slaves Against Rome) is a 1964 Italian sword-and-sandal adventure film, directed by Michele Lupo, produced by Elio Scardamaglia, written by Lupo and Roberto Gianviti and starring Roger Browne, Gordon Mitchell and Arnaldo Fabrizio. First released in Italy in 1964, it premiered in New York City, United States on August 18, 1965.

== Cast ==
- Roger Browne as Marcus
- Gordon Mitchell as Balisten
- Arnaldo Fabrizio as Goliath
- Scilla Gabel as Claudia
- Aldo Pini as Traidor
- Alfredo Rizzo as Efrem
- Giacomo Rossi-Stuart as Gaius
- Carlo Tamberlani as Lucius Terentius
- Germano Longo as Lucius Emilius
- Alfio Caltabiano as Gladiatore
- Calisto Calisti as Selim

== See also ==
- List of Italian films of 1964
