= Fire of Love =

Fire of Love may refer to:

- Fire of Love (1925 film), a German silent film
- Fire of Love (1967 film), a French-Italian drama
- Fire of Love (2022 film), an American-Canadian documentary
- Fire of Love (album), a 1981 album by The Gun Club
- "Fire of Love", a song by Jody Reynolds later covered by The Gun Club
- "Fire of Love (Pali się)", Poland's entry in the Eurovision Song Contest 2019
- Ishq Ki Aag (lit. 'Fire of Love'), Hindi title of the 2006 Indian Tamil-language film Kedi
