= Achille Zavatta =

Clown

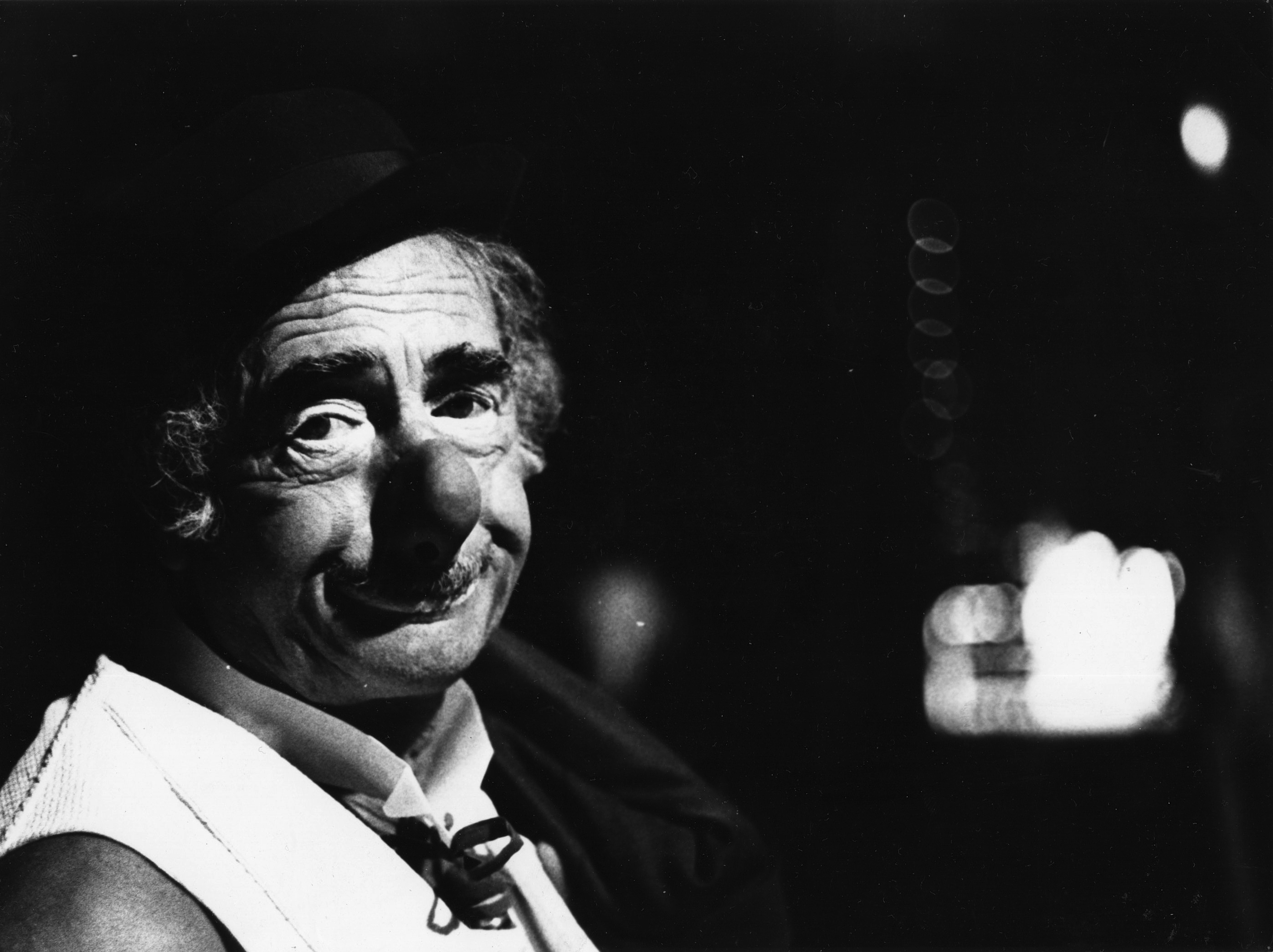
- Zavatta in 1974
- Born: 6 May 1915; La Goulette, Tunisia
- Died: 16 November 1993 (aged 78); Ouzouer-des-Champs, Loiret, France
- Resting place: Père Lachaise Cemetery
- Occupation: Clown

Achille Zavatta (6 May 1915 – 16 November 1993) was a French clown, artist and circus operator.

== Biography ==
Zavatta was born in La Goulette, Tunisia, the son of Federico Zavatta, a circus owner. He started performing in his family's circus show at the age of three, forming with his brothers Michel and Rolph, the Zavatta Trio. He was the interval act at the 1962 Eurovision Song Contest in Luxemburg. To this day the Zavatta Circus tours France and surrounding countries, these performances include live tiger acts, which means the circus cannot tour Britain under the Animal Welfare Act. The circus is rated as a top show in France.

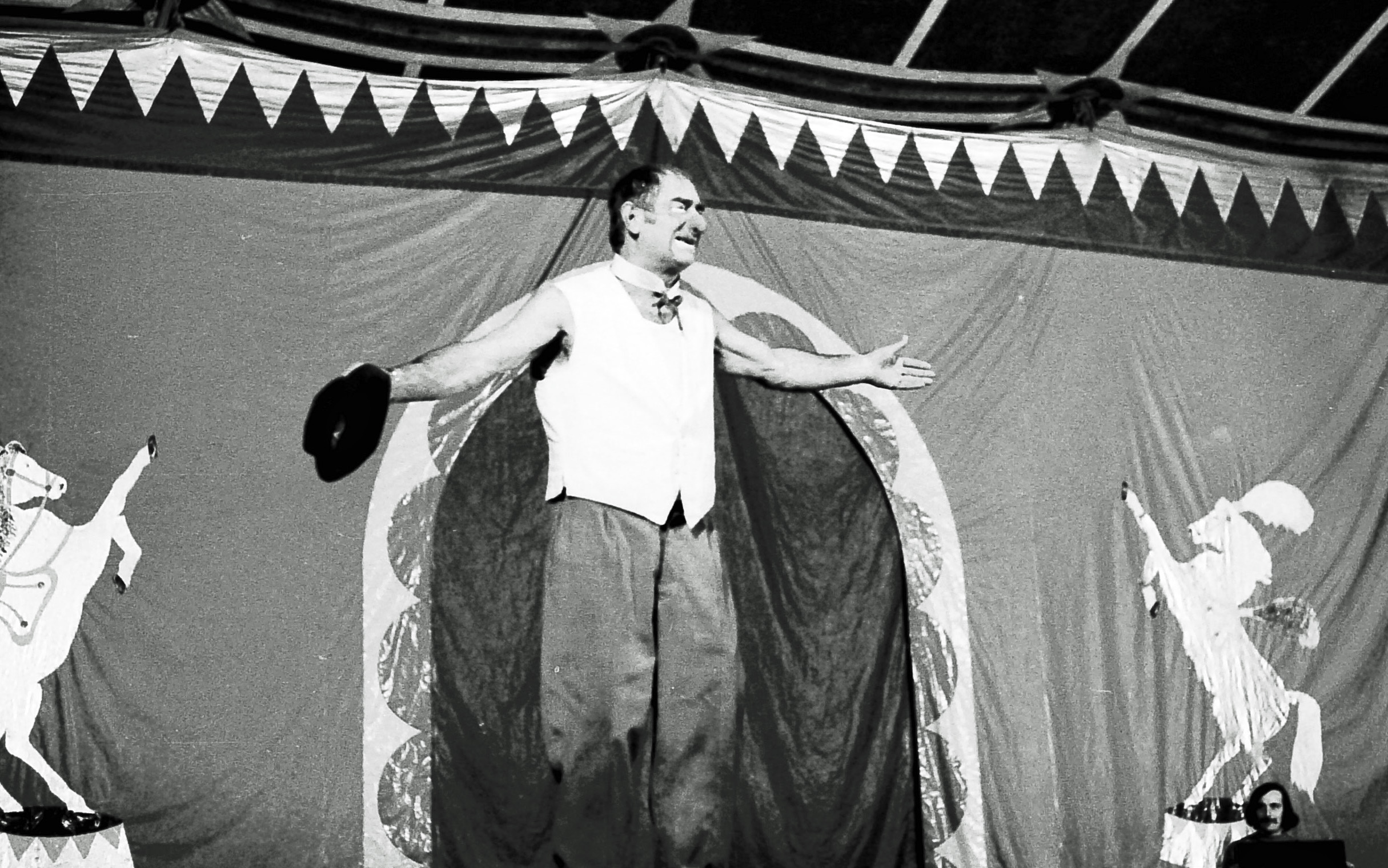
Achille Zavatta in Quimperlé in February 1980

He became famous for his skills as a pantomime.

He committed suicide in 1993 in Ouzouer-des-Champs, Loiret and was interred in the Père Lachaise Cemetery in Paris.

== Filmography ==
Year	Title	Role	Notes
1951	Au fil des ondes	Himself	
1956	Trapeze	Achille Zavatta	Uncredited
1957	Du sang sous le chapiteau	Boniface	
1959	Visa pour l'enfer	Le Gitan	
1959	The Green Mare	Déodat - le facteur	
1959	Match contre la mort	Le clown	
1964	Rien ne va plus	Achille	
1964	Tintin and the Blue Oranges	Un invité au château de Moulinsart	Uncredited
1967	Fire of Love	Pierre Michaux	
1967	The Curse of Belphegor	Hubert	
1971	La grande maffia...	Le papa #2	
