= The Unnaturals =

1969 film by Antonio Margheriti

- German film poster
- Directed by: Antonio Margheriti
- Screenplay by: Antonio Margheriti
- Story by: Antonio Margheriti
- Produced by: Artur Brauner; Antonio Margheriti
- Starring: Joachim Fuchsberger; Marianne Koch; Helga Anders; Claudio Camaso
- Cinematography: Riccardo Pallottini
- Edited by: Otello Colangeli
- Music by: Carlo Savina
- Production companies: Super International Pictures S.l.P.; Edo Cinematografica; CCC Filmkunst GmbH
- Release dates: 30 May 1969 (West Germany); 12 September 1969 (Italy)
- Running time: 91 minutes
- Countries: Italy; West Germany
- Box office: ₤287 million

The Unnaturals (Italian: Contronatura, German: Schreie in der Nacht) is a gothic horror film directed and written by Antonio Margheriti. It is loosely based on Dino Buzzati's short story "Eppure bussano alla porta" from the collection The Seven Messengers. The film is an Italian and West German co-production between Super International Pictures S.l.P, Edo Cinematografica, and CCC Filmkunst GmbH. The film stars Joachim Fuchsberger and Marianne Koch in her last film role.

== Plot ==
On a stormy night, set in the early 20th century, a group of members of London's high society are traveling home from a social event and their car gets stuck in the mud in the countryside. They seek refuge in a remote country house. There they are received by the mysterious Uriat and his taciturn mother. Uriat explains to the guests that his mother has the powers of a medium and can communicate with the dead. Some of the guests are amused and are persuaded to take part in a séance. But when the old woman begins to tell those present details from their own past, the mood quickly changes. It turns out that everyone present carries a dark secret with them and the group is entangled in a web of mutual deception, affairs (including lesbian affairs) and acts of violence. The hosts are also part of this network, as it finally turns out. As former servants, they were once charged with a double homicide for which those present are responsible, and seek their own justice.

== Cast ==
- Joachim Fuchsberger: Ben Taylor
- Marianne Koch: Vivian Taylor
- Helga Anders: Elizabeth
- Claudio Camaso: Alfred Sinclair
- Luciano Pigozzi: Uriat
- Dominique Boschero: Margarete
- Giuliano Raffaelli: Archibald Barrett
- Marco Morelli: Richard Wright
- Gudrun Schmidt: Diana

== Production ==
Margheriti stated the shooting title of the film was Trance. The Unnaturals was aimed at a German market and stars Joachim Fuchsberger and Marianne Koch who were very popular actors with German audiences. Margheriti added other Italian actors of his choice including Luciano Pigozzi, a close friend of his.

The film was shot at Tirrenia Studios which was owned by Carlo Ponti. Margheriti used sets left over from several other films ranging from costume dramas to Westerns. For the seance scene in the film, cinematographer Riccardo Pallottini was hung upside down from the ceiling with the camera in his hand and slowly let him descend from the ceiling. He would then bend over backwards to raise the camera to the actors' faces.

== Release ==
The Unnaturals was shown in West Germany on 30 May 1969. It was later released in Italy on 12September 1969, where it grossed 287 million Italian lire.

== Reception ==
In his book Italian Horror Film Directors, Louis Paul dismissed the film as an " uneven but still interesting tale of revenge".

== See also ==
- List of horror films of 1969
- List of Italian films of 1969
- List of German films of the 1960s
