= Nicoletta Machiavelli =

Italian actress (1944–2015)

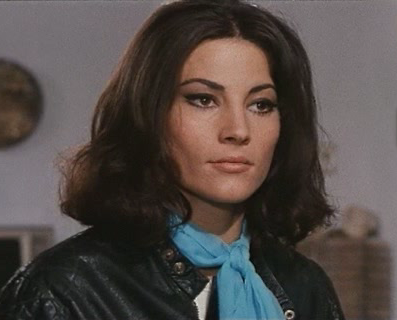
- Machiavelli in the movie Our Husbands (1966)
- Born: 1 August 1944; Stuffione, Ravarino, Modena, Kingdom of Italy
- Died: 15 November 2015 (aged 71); Seattle, Washington, U.S.
- Other names: Nicoletta Rangoni Machiavelli; Nicoletta Macchiavelli
- Occupation: Actress (until 1983)
- Years active: 1965–1983

Nicoletta Machiavelli (1 August 1944 – 15 November 2015) was an Italian film actress, also known as Nicoletta Rangoni Machiavelli and Nicoletta Macchiavelli.

== Life and career ==
The daughter of a Florentine father and of an American mother, Machiavelli was a descendant of the political philosopher and historian Niccolò Machiavelli. She studied painting at the Accademia di Belle Arti di Firenze.

Following an audition for the role of Eva in John Huston's The Bible: In the Beginning..., she was noted by the producer Dino De Laurentiis who put her under contract for seven years, a contract she eventually broke after three years.

Her first role was Ugo Tognazzi's wife in A Question of Honour, and following a few comedies, her early career was characterized by genre films, mainly spaghetti Western, notably Sergio Corbucci's Navajo Joe.

Starting from the late 1960s Machiavelli started appearing in more ambitious art films, working with Hans-Jürgen Syberberg, Pietro Germi, Dino Risi, Sergio Citti, Andrzej Żuławski, and Liliana Cavani, among others.

In 1984, Machiavelli became a disciple of Osho and retired from show business. She eventually moved to Seattle, Washington, where among other things she taught Italian at the Bellevue College and at the University of Washington. She died of an undisclosed illness on 15 November 2015, aged 71.

== Selected filmography ==
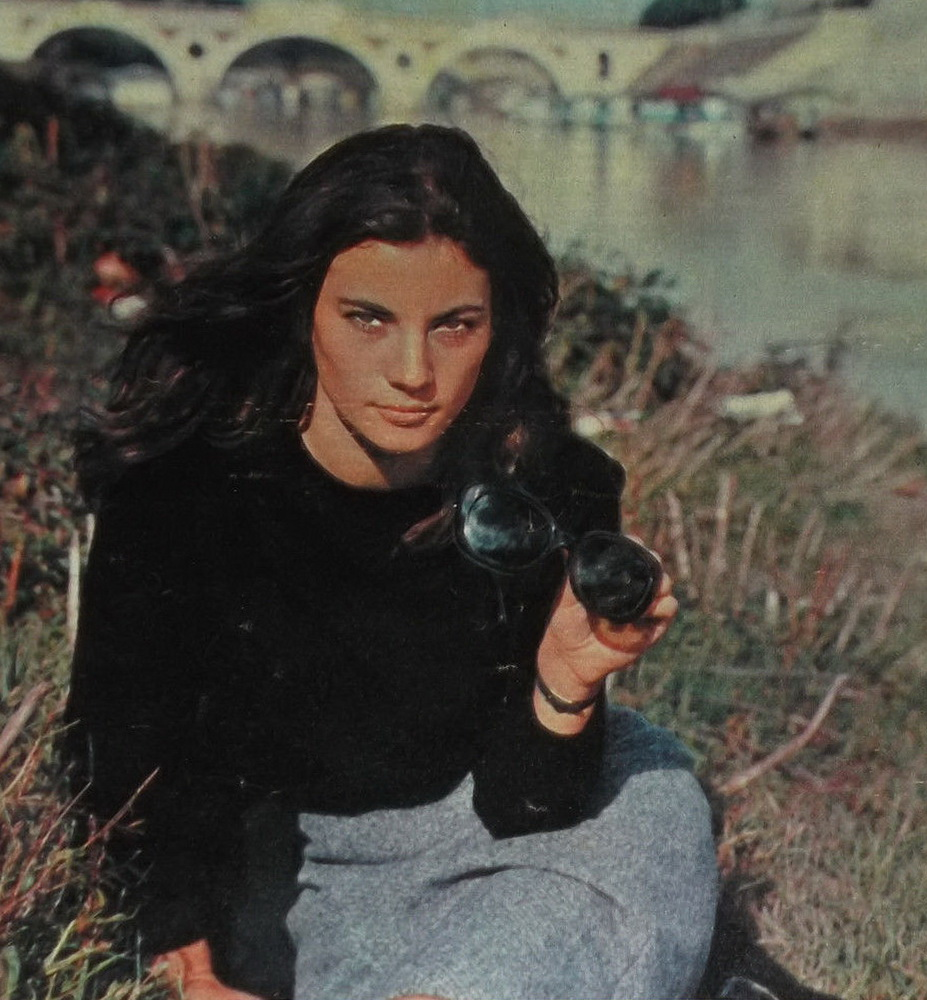
Nicoletta Machiavelli, 1964

- Thrilling (1965)
- A Question of Honour (1966) – Domenicangela Piras
- Our Husbands (1966) – Roberta (segment "Il Marito di Roberta")
- Kiss the Girls and Make Them Die (1966) – Sylvia
- The Hills Run Red (1966) – Mary Ann
- Navajo Joe (1966) – Estella – Mrs. Lynne's maid
- Matchless (1967) – Tipsy
- Anyone Can Play (1968)
- A Minute to Pray, a Second to Die (1968) – Laurinda
- Garter Colt (1968) – Lulu 'Garter' Colt
- Hate Thy Neighbor (1968) – Peggy Savalas
- Candy (1968) – Marquita
- Scarabea: How Much Land Does a Man Need? (1969) – Scarabea
- Temptation (1970) – Carla Veraldi
- A Noose for Django (1969) – Maya
- Monte Carlo or Bust! (1969) – Dominique
- Carnal Circuit (1969) – Luisa Lamberti
- It Takes a Thief, ep. "Who'll Bid Two Million Dollars?" (1969) – Varina
- The Ravine (1969) – Anja Kovach
- Necropolis (1970)
- A Pocketful of Chestnuts (1970) – Teresa
- Lover of the Great Bear (1971) – Leonia
- The Policeman (1971)
- Man with the Transplanted Brain (1971) – Héléna
- Dirty Weekend (1973) – Sylva
- Tony Arzenta (1973) – Anna – wife of Tony
- La coppia (1973)
- Bawdy Tales (1973) – Duchessa Caterina di Ronciglione
- Die merkwürdige Lebensgeschichte des Friedrich Freiherrn von der Trenck (1973) – Amalie – sister of Frederick the Great
- Icy Breasts (1974) – Mrs. Rilson
- That Most Important Thing: Love (1975) – Luce, la femme de Lapade
- Malicious Pleasure (1975) – Melisa
- L'Année sainte (1976) – Carla, la terroriste
- Free Hand for a Tough Cop (1976) – Mara
- Beyond Good and Evil (1977) – Amanda
- La fuite en avant (1983) – Fiama (final film role)
