= Claudio Camaso =

Italian actor (1939–1977)

- Born: Claudio Volonté; 3 February 1939; Turin, Kingdom of Italy
- Died: 16 September 1977 (aged 38); Rome, Italy
- Occupation: Actor
- Years active: 1964–1976
- Spouse: Verena Baer (m. 1972)
- Children: 1
- Relatives: Gian Maria Volonté (brother)

Claudio Camaso (born Claudio Volonté; 3 February 1939 – 16 September 1977) was an Italian actor, noted as much for his troubled, violent life as for his performances. He was the younger brother of fellow actor Gian Maria Volonté.

== Early life and career ==
Claudio Volonté was born in Turin in 1939, in the days leading up to the Second World War. His father, Mario, was a committed fascist who commanded a unit of the paramilitary Black Brigades (Brigate Nere) at Chivasso during the final months of the Italian Social Republic, while his mother Carolina (née Bianchi) was a scion of the Milanese haute bourgeoisie. In the aftermath of the war, Mario Volonté was sentenced to thirty years in prison upon being found guilty of aiding the military operations of the enemy "by ordering and participating in rounding up elements of the resistance movement in which many murders and robberies were committed". Although excluded from the general amnesty pronounced by the then justice minister, Palmiro Togliatti, he only served eight years of his sentence. His absence nevertheless led to a life of privations and hardships for the rest of the Volonté family.

Following in the footsteps of his elder brother Gian Maria, Claudio decided to become an actor, and at some point in the early 1960s he adopted the pseudonym of Claudio Camaso. From 1964 to 1976 Camaso appeared in more than twenty films, again emulating his brother by starring in Spaghetti Westerns such as Antonio Margheriti's film Vengeance (1968). Latterly he reverted back to his real name, maintaining a career as a supporting actor by starring in Westerns, gialli movies and lurid, low-budget mondo productions, of which CIA Secret Story (Faccia di spia; 1975) – his last film, in which he played Che Guevara – is perhaps a prime example.

== Controversies ==
Unlike his brother, who was noted for his attachment to radical left-wing causes, Camaso's youth was marked by clear neo-fascist sympathies. While still a minor, he was acquitted on a charge of taking part in a demonstration that damaged property owned by the Italian Communist Party (PCI), and he was later accused of being involved in a bomb attack on another Communist Party building. By the late 1950s, while living in Trieste and Rome, he was a member of the youth section of the fascist Italian Social Movement (MSI). He was also reportedly acquainted with several young neo-fascist ideologues involved in establishing the militant organisation Avanguardia Nazionale, most notably the organisation's leader, Stefano Delle Chiaie.

In February 1965, Camaso was arrested while performing as an SS officer in the controversial Rolf Hochhuth play The Deputy – a production that had already been subject to attempts by the authorities to close it down – and he was subsequently charged with planting a bomb that had damaged a side entrance to the Vatican City. The Baltimore Sun reported that the police based their suspicions of Camaso on his past record and the fact that he sported a beard, which matched the description of one of the perpetrators given by an eyewitness; the newspaper also noted, however, that Camaso had by this time apparently renounced his earlier extreme-right opinions and joined the Italian Socialist Party of Proletarian Unity (PSIUP). Maintaining that he should not be judged by "my old judiciary errors", Camaso denied the charge made against him, claiming that he was in the company of his girlfriend Dominique Boschero on the evening when the crime took place. Nine months on, in October, he was cleared by a magistrate on the grounds that he had "no case to answer".

== Murder of Vincenzo Mazza and suicide ==
In August 1977 Camaso was arrested for stabbing a man to death in a street brawl. Hank Werba, Rome bureau chief for the film industry magazine Variety, reported the situation thus:

Actor Claudio Volonte [sic], younger brother of Italo thesp Gian Maria Volonte, gave himself up to the police after he stabbed a friend to death in old Rome early this month. As he turned himself in, Volonte said the fatal stabbing of film gaffer Vincenzo Mazza was involuntary. The incident took place after Mazza intervened during a personal altercation between Volonte, under the influence of alcohol, and his ex-wife [sic], a shopkeeper in Campo de' Fiori.

The Italian communist daily l'Unità further reported that the incident had occurred on 26 July, not August as the Variety article had suggested, and that Camaso's young daughter Saba had witnessed the attack.

On 16 September 1977, while in police custody, Camaso committed suicide by hanging himself in his cell in Regina Coeli prison.

== Filmography ==
Year	Title	Role	Notes
1965	I Knew Her Well	Adriana's First Boyfriend	
1966	Wake Up and Die	Franco Magni	
1966	Fury in Marrakesh		as Claudio Volonté
1966	Maigret and His Greatest Case	Giorgio Genaro	
1967	Ten Thousand Dollars for a Massacre	Manuel Vasqiez	
1967	Fire of Love		
1967	John the Bastard	Don Francisco Tenorio	
1967	Vengeance Is Mine	Clint Forest	
1968	Crónica de un atraco	Scott	
1968	Vengeance	'Professor' Mendoza	
1968	Garter Colt	Red (Rosso)	
1969	The Unnaturals	Alfred Sinclair	
1971	La grande scrofa nera		as Claudio Volonté
1971	A Bay of Blood	Simon	as Claudio Volonté
1974	All Screwed Up	Bruno, cook from Turin	as Claudio Volonté
1974	Il tempo dell'inizio	Medico / Servo di 1°categoria	as Claudio Volonté
1975	Faccia di spia	Che Guevara	as Claudio Volonté
