= Hercules the Avenger =

- Directed by: Maurizio Lucidi
- Screenplay by: Lorenzo Gicca Palli
- Starring: Reg Park; Gia Sandri; Giovanni Ciangriglia; Adriana Ambesi
- Cinematography: Alvaro Mancori
- Edited by: Maurizio Lucidi
- Production companies: Plaza Film; Schermi Riuniti
- Release date: 13 August 1965 (Italy)
- Running time: 96 minutes
- Country: Italy

Hercules the Avenger (Italian: La sfida dei giganti) is a 1965 Italian adventure film directed by Maurizio Lucidi. It was composed mostly of re-edited stock footage from Reg Park's two 1961 Hercules films, Hercules at the Conquest of Atlantis and Hercules in the Haunted World.

== Cast ==
- Reg Park as Hercules
- Gia Sandri as Queen Leda
- Giovanni Cianfriglia as Anteo
- Adriana Ambesi (credited as Audrey Amber) as Deyanira
- Luigi Barbini as Xantos
- Gianni Solaro as Teseo
- Franco Ressel as Eteocles
- Luigi Donato as Timoniere

== Production ==
The screenplay author for the film is billed as Enzo Gicca, which is an alias for Lorenzo Gicca Palli. Hercules the Avenger consists mostly of footage from Hercules in the Haunted World and Hercules and the Captive Women.

== Release ==
Hercules the Avenger was released in Italy on 13 August 1965.

== See also ==
- List of films featuring Hercules
