= A Question of Honour (film) =

- Soundtrack
- Directed by: Luigi Zampa
- Written by: Leonardo Benvenuti; Piero De Bernardi; Lorenzo Gicca Palli; Luigi Zampa
- Starring: Ugo Tognazzi; Nicoletta Machiavelli; Bernard Blier; Franco Fabrizi; Leopoldo Triste
- Cinematography: Carlo Di Palma; Luciano Trasatti
- Edited by: Eraldo Da Roma
- Music by: Luis Enríquez Bacalov
- Release date: 1965
- Running time: 110 minutes
- Countries: Italy; France
- Language: Italian

A Question of Honour (Italian: Una questione d'onore) is a 1965 Italian comedy-drama film directed by Luigi Zampa. It was co-produced with France. The film was entered into the 16th Berlin International Film Festival.

== Plot ==
Efisio Mulas is a meek laborer who lives with occasional work, especially in Don Leandro Sanna's salon, and rounds up the slim balance by betting with colleagues in strength with the game "head against head". In the village the Sanna and Porcu families' conflict has lasted over a century.

The normality of the events is broken by the release, for the amnesty wanted by the pope, of the beautiful Domenicangela Piras, the turbulent girlfriend of Efisio convicted for having hurt him with a billhook. At the same time the old man of honor, Agostino Sanna, is about to instigate his nephew Don Leandro to kill Alvaro Porcu. Don Leandro does not intend to support his uncle, so it takes time, insinuating that Alvaro Porcu has been hiding in Supramonte for fear of him.

Efisio marries Domenicangela having, finally, obtained the consent of her father required by the priest, the fugitive don Liberato. Meanwhile, Agostino Sanna decides to haunt down Alvaro to kill him, but succumbs. Leandro, walking to stop his uncle, attends to his death, and, disgusted, to avoid the continuation of the vendetta, decides to move into his estate, seeking for peace.

Efisio needs money and decides to steal sheep from the estate, but the watchdog pulls him out of his pants.

During the wedding celebrations of Efisio and Domenicangela, she gets rid of those pants, throwing them in the street. The marshal of the carabinieri find them, and, having seen the bites of the dog and the blood left on them, immediately arrests him. Efisio runs away and decides to flee in Milan.

Meanwhile, a new event is about to reopen the vendetta: Giovanni Sanna, Leandro's younger brother, challenges on public square Alvaro Porcu to take revenge for Uncle Agostino, hitting his face with a glove. Don Leandro is furious, because at this point he is under threat from the revenge of Egidio Porcu, brother of Alvaro and the last surviving adult male of the family. The family risks to remain with no males. He proposes then an exchange to Efisio: he will return to Sardinia to kill Egidio Porcu, and Don Leandro, in return, will witness his innocence in the murder of Uncle Agostino. Efisio agrees, but he is incapable of killing, and, when he is back in Sardinia decides to meet his wife only. At the same time Egidio Porcu is killed by an unknown hand.

At Efisio's trial, he is declared not guilty and then he can return in his village as a free man, but he finds a hostile atmosphere. Dominicangela, in fact, is pregnant and everyone is questioning the identity of the father. For Efisio there is then a tragic dilemma: to reveal that he is the father of the about to be born (and confess his presence in the village on the day of the murder of Egidio Porcu) or undergo social stigmatization.

When Don Leandro turns his back on him, Efisio turns to Don Liberato, who makes him understanding the name of the true assassin of Egidio Porcu. Efisio then attempts to involve a young carabiniere to make him witness the man's confession, and, during a country party, tries to tease him. But precisely at the crucial moment, the assassin of Egidio Porcu expresses itself in Sardinian. The carabiniere does not understand a word, and immediately after, the murder is killed by a rival. Efisio has no option than killing the innocent Domenicangela and end up in jail. Only in this way it is possible to end this endless conflict between families and regain the respect of the people of his village.

The film ends with the sad imprisonment of Efisio with the people of his village paying him the so sought-after respect.

== Cast ==
- Ugo Tognazzi - Efisio Mulas
- Nicoletta Machiavelli - Domenicangela Piras
- Bernard Blier - Don Leandro Sanna
- Franco Fabrizi - Egidio Porcu
- Lucien Raimbourg - Liberato Piras
- Tecla Scarano - Efisio's mother
- Leopoldo Trieste - Advocate Mazzullo
- Sandro Merli - Marechal Vaccaro
- Franco Bucceri - A policeman
- Franco Gulà - Agostino Sanna
- Armando Malpede - Sergeant Capuano
- Giuseppe Grasso - Antonio Piras
