= One, Two, Three =

1961 film by Billy Wilder

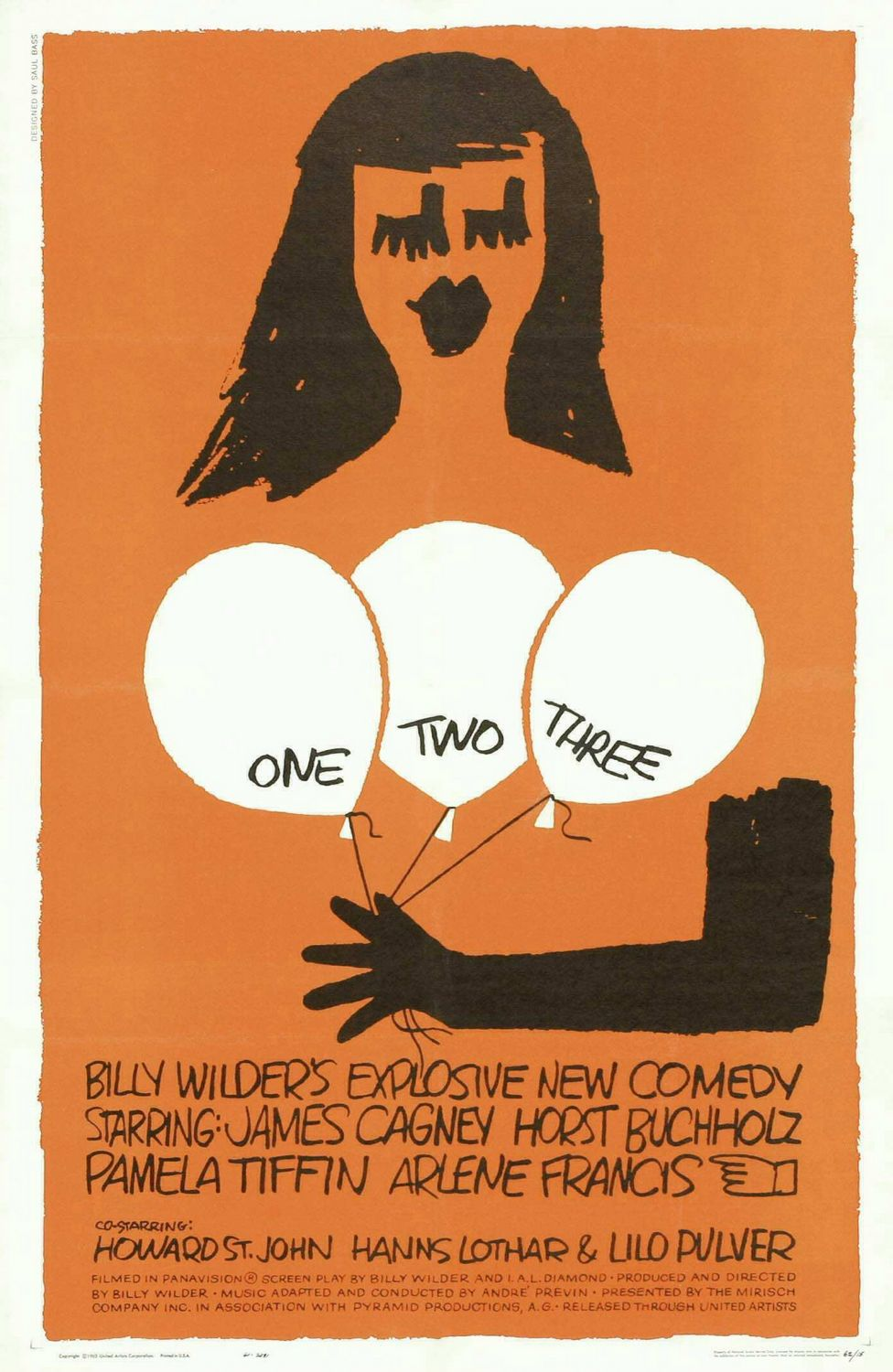
- Theatrical release poster by Saul Bass
- Directed by: Billy Wilder
- Screenplay by: I. A. L. Diamond; Billy Wilder
- Based on: Egy, kettő, három by Ferenc Molnár
- Produced by: Billy Wilder
- Starring: James Cagney; Horst Buchholz; Pamela Tiffin; Arlene Francis
- Cinematography: Daniel L. Fapp
- Edited by: Daniel Mandell
- Music by: André Previn
- Production companies: The Mirisch Company; Pyramid Productions, A. G.
- Distributed by: United Artists
- Release date: December 15, 1961 (United States)
- Running time: 104 minutes
- Country: United States
- Languages: English; German; Russian
- Budget: $3 million or $2 million
- Box office: $4 million

Theatrical trailer

One, Two, Three is a 1961 American political comedy film directed by Billy Wilder, and written by Wilder and I. A. L. Diamond. It is based on the 1929 Hungarian one-act play Egy, kettő, három by Ferenc Molnár, with a "plot borrowed partly from" Ninotchka, a 1939 film co-written by Wilder. The film stars James Cagney, Horst Buchholz, Liselotte Pulver, Pamela Tiffin, Arlene Francis, Leon Askin and Howard St. John. It would be Cagney's last film appearance until Ragtime in 1981, 20 years later.

The film is primarily set in West Berlin during the Cold War, but before the construction of the Berlin Wall, and politics is predominant in the premise. The film is known for its quick pace.

== Plot ==
C.R. "Mac" MacNamara is a high-ranking executive in the Coca-Cola Company, assigned to West Berlin after a business fiasco a few years earlier in the Middle East (about which he is still bitter). While based in West Germany for now, Mac is angling to become head of Western European Coca-Cola Operations, based in London. After working on an arrangement to introduce Coke into the Soviet Union, Mac receives a call from his boss, W.P. Hazeltine, at Coca-Cola headquarters in Atlanta. Scarlett Hazeltine, the boss's hot-blooded but slightly dim 17-year-old socialite daughter, is coming to West Berlin. Mac is assigned the unenviable task of taking care of her.

An expected two-week stay extends into two months, and Mac discovers just why Scarlett is so enamored of West Berlin: she surprises him by announcing that she's married to Otto Piffl, a young East German Communist with ardent anti-capitalistic views. When the Southern belle is confronted about her foolishness in the matter of helping him blow up anti-American "Yankee Go Home" balloons (how the couple met) she simply replies with, "It's not anti-American, it's anti-Yankee. Where I come from, everybody's against the Yankees."

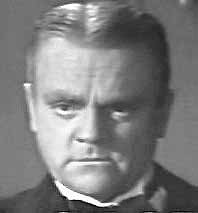
James Cagney plays “Mac” MacNamara, who must scheme to deal with crises that threaten his promotion to head of Coca-Cola European Operations.

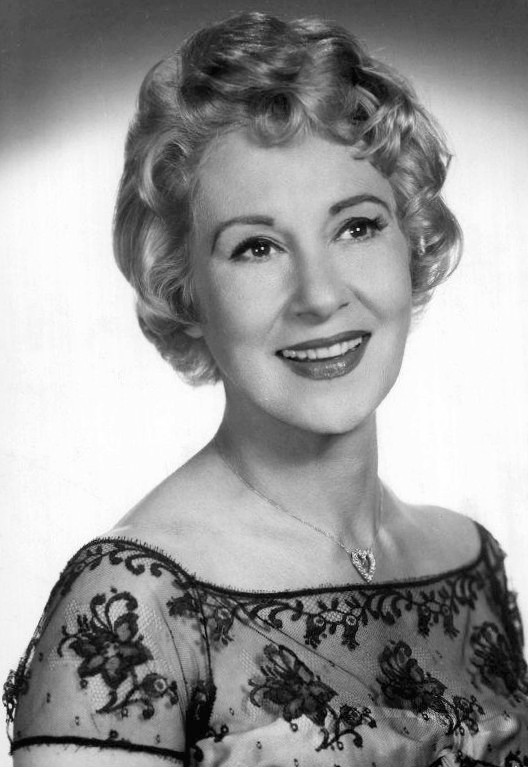
Arlene Francis plays Mac’s exasperated wife, Phyllis, who tries to keep him honest.

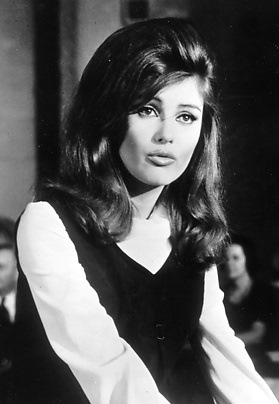
Pamela Tiffin plays Scarlett Hazeltine, impulsive daughter of Mac’s boss, who creates the crises that Mac must deal with.

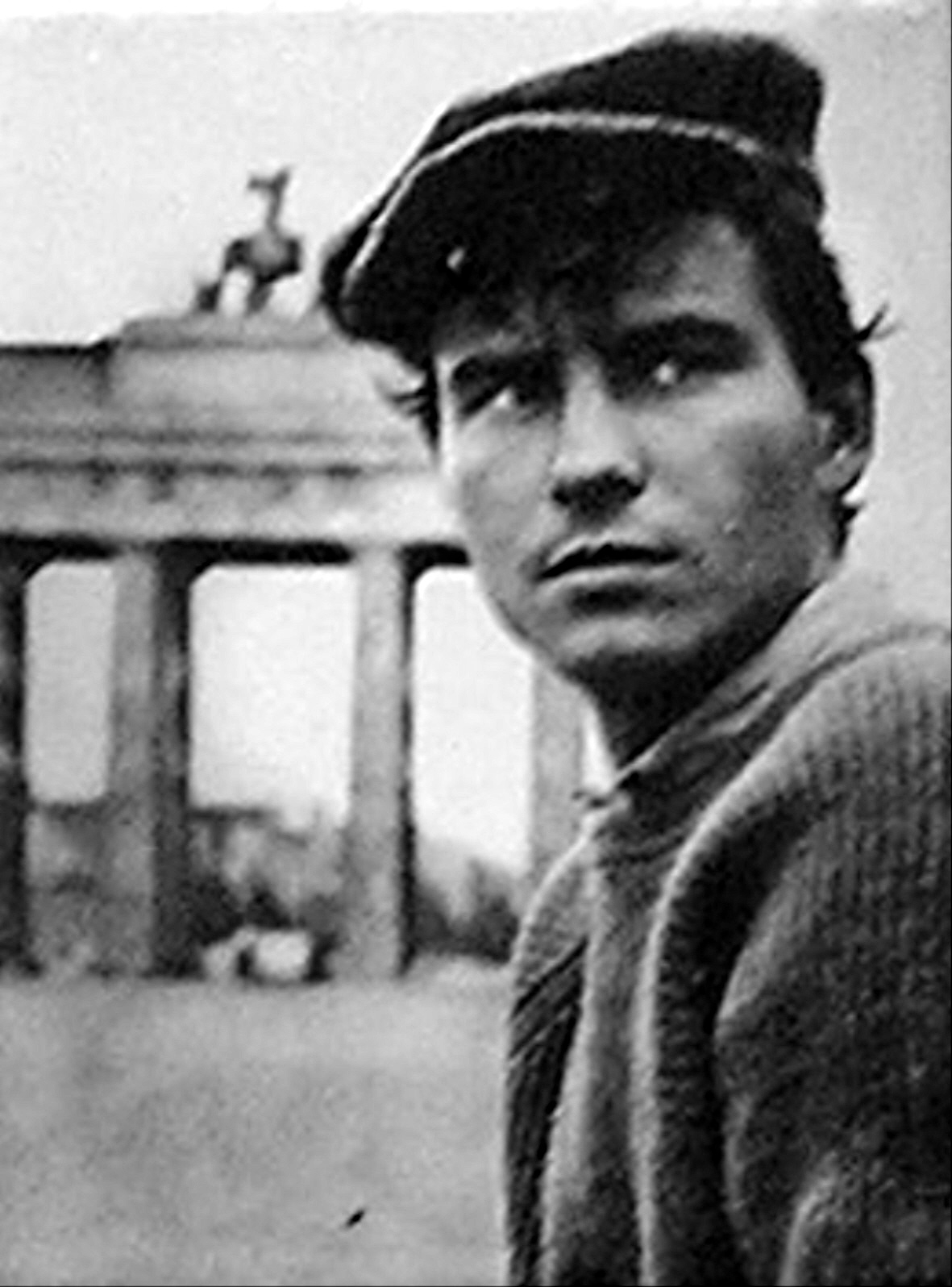
Horst Buchholz as Otto Piffl, card-carrying Communist whose marriage to Scarlett must be made acceptable to her conservative parents from Atlanta, Georgia.

Mac tries to come to terms with letting his boss's daughter marry a Communist and learns the horrible truth: the couple are bound for Moscow to make a new life for themselves ("They've assigned us a magnificent apartment, just a short walk from the bathroom!"). Since Hazeltine and his wife are coming to Berlin to collect their daughter the next day, Mac deals with the disaster by bribing East German officials to steal Scarlett’s marriage certificate from the archives. Mac also frames the young Communist firebrand Otto, resulting in his being arrested by the East German police, by planting on his motorcycle a "Russky Go Home" balloon and presenting him with a wedding present of an Uncle Sam cuckoo clock wrapped in the Wall Street Journal. After Otto, during interrogation, is forced to listen endlessly to a cover of the song "Itsy Bitsy Teenie Weenie Yellow Polka Dot Bikini" (which is intentionally badly distorted as it plays) he cracks and signs a confession saying that he is an American spy.

Under pressure from his exasperated and disapproving wife Phyllis (who wants to take her family back to live in the US), and with the revelation that Scarlett is pregnant—and, worse, unmarried with her East German marriage certificate gone—Mac must now fix the mess he has created. He must restore the marriage certificate and bring Otto back with the help of his new Soviet business associates on whom Mac uses all his wiles, as well as his sexy secretary, Fräulein Ingeborg. With the boss on the way, he finds that his only chance is to turn Otto into a son-in-law in good standing—which means, among other things, making him a capitalist with an aristocratic pedigree (albeit contrived by adoption).

Mac arranges to have Otto adopted by an impoverished count, who now works as a washroom attendant, and includes a photo of the ruins of the family castle with the price of adoption ("U.S. Air Force, 1944?" "No,Turkish Cavalry, 1683."). Scarlett is dubious that her father will be fooled by the ruse but is reassured that her baby will now be part of a long line of bleeders, which will please her snobbish mother. In a frenetic race against time and the arrival of the Hazeltines' plane, Mac outfits Otto in complete paraphernalia befitting his new aristocratic status, while Otto rails against being forced to join the detested bourgeoisie (his Communist Party membership is paid up through the year). Meanwhile, Scarlett and Mac coach Otto on how to speak to her conservative Southern father ("The Civil War was a draw...").

In the end, the Hazeltines approve of their new son-in-law, Otto, who Mac learns from Hazeltine will be named the new head of Western European Operations, with a disappointed Mac getting a promotion to VP of Procurement back in Atlanta. Mac reconciles with his family at the airport. To celebrate his promotion, he buys them Cokes from a vending machine. After handing out the bottles, he discovers that the last one actually is a Pepsi-Cola.

== Cast ==
- James Cagney as C.R. "Mac" MacNamara
- Horst Buchholz as Otto Ludwig Piffl
- Pamela Tiffin as Scarlett Hazeltine
- Arlene Francis as Phyllis MacNamara
- Liselotte Pulver as Fräulein Ingeborg (Mac's secretary)
- Hanns Lothar as Schlemmer (Mac's assistant)
- Howard St. John as Wendell P. Hazeltine
- Leon Askin as Peripetchikoff
- Ralf Wolter as Borodenko
- Peter Capell as Mishkin
- Karl Lieffen as Fritz (Mac's chauffeur)
- Hubert von Meyerinck as Count Waldemar von Droste-Schattenburg
- Sig Ruman as the voice of Count von Droste-Schattenburg
- Loïs Bolton as Melanie Hazeltine
- Til Kiwe as Reporter
- Henning Schlüter as Dr. Bauer
- Karl Ludwig Lindt as Zeidlitz, Mac's lawyer
- Red Buttons as MP Sergeant (uncredited)
- Friedrich Hollaender as conductor of the hotel orchestra (uncredited)

== Production ==
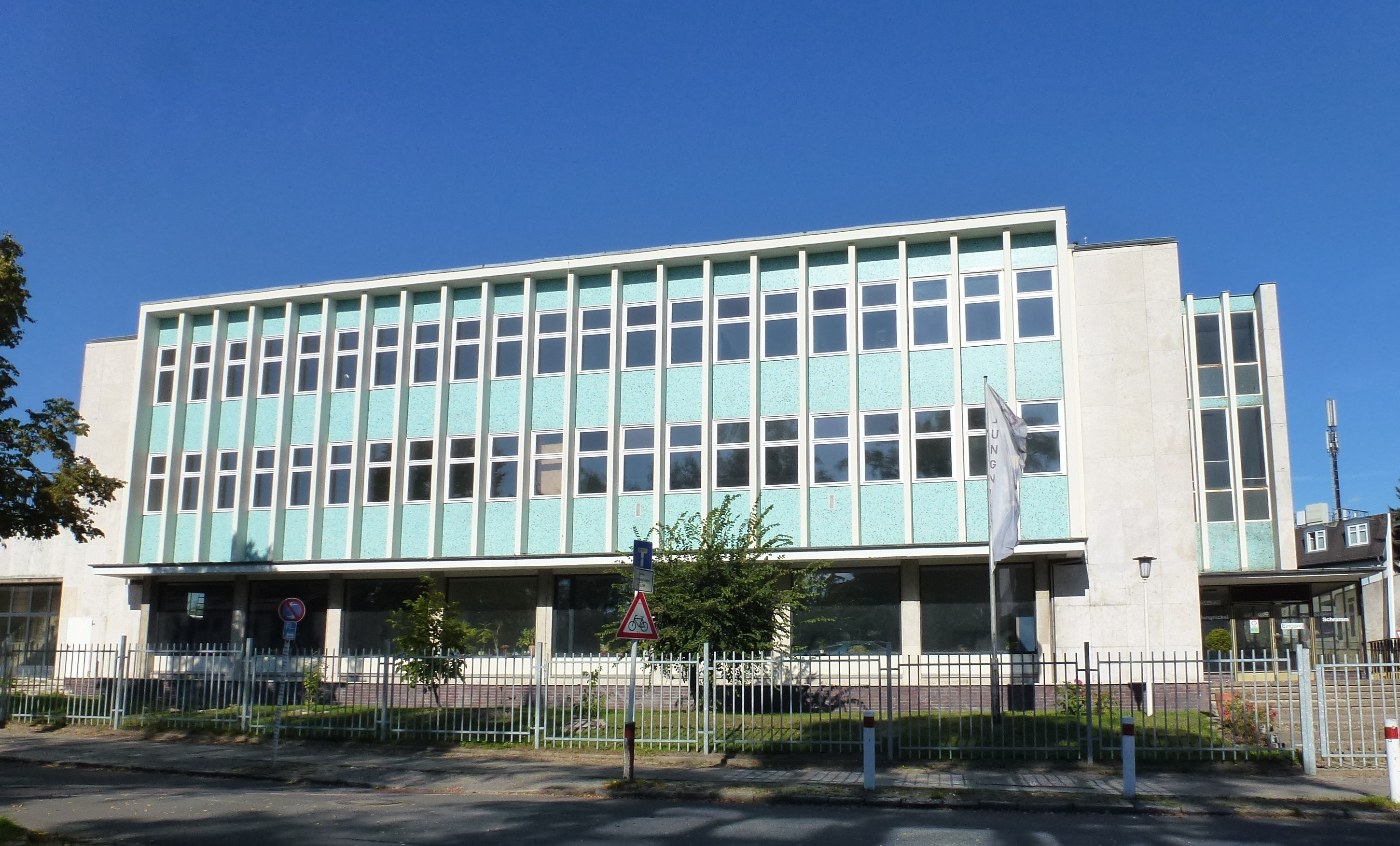
Filming location at the former Coca-Cola headquarters in Berlin, Hildburghauser Strasse 224, photographed in 2012

We knew that we were going to have a comedy, we [were] not going to be waiting for the laughs. But we had to go with Cagney, because Cagney was the whole picture. He really had the rhythm, and that was very good. It was not funny. But just the speed was funny ... The general idea was, let's make the fastest picture in the world ... And yeah, we did not wait, for once, for the big laughs.

— —From Conversations with Wilder (1999, ISBN 0-375-40660-3) by Cameron Crowe

Cagney decided to take the role primarily because it was to be shot in Germany: while growing up in Manhattan's Yorkville neighborhood, he had had fond memories of the area, which was "teeming with German immigrants." Horst Buchholz was a young European actor who had recently finished The Magnificent Seven with Yul Brynner, Eli Wallach and Steve McQueen; reportedly, to star in the film, he turned down a role in Lawrence of Arabia. During the production of One, Two, Three, Buchholz became the only actor that Cagney ever openly disliked.

It is very interesting that not until the very end of my career did I meet an unco-operative fellow actor. As I review the pictures I’ve been in, I realize that each and every actor I worked with had a part in shaping my summary views on acting. We all worked together rewardingly with what I hope was mutual enrichment. I never had the slightest difficulty with a fellow actor until the making of One, Two, Three. In that picture, Horst Buchholz tried all kinds of scene-stealing didoes, and I had to depend on Billy Wilder to take some steps to correct this kid. If Billy hadn't, I was going to knock Buchholz on his ass, which at several points I would have been very happy to do.

— —From Cagney By Cagney (1976, ISBN 0-385-04587-5)

Although Tuesday Weld lobbied strongly for the role of Scarlett, the role went to Pamela Tiffin, her second film role following Summer and Smoke, who was chosen after Wilder spotted her in an ad in The New York Times and cast her immediately following her audition. To star in the film, Tiffin dropped out of Frank Capra's Pocketful of Miracles, with her role being reassigned to Ann-Margret. Reportedly, Liselotte Pulver was cast as the secretary after being noticed by Wilder's wife Audrey at a party hosted by Curt Jurgens. Jack Lemmon was initially cast in the uncredited cameo role of an army corporal, though the part was eventually given to Red Buttons.

Wilder was filming in Berlin the morning the Berlin Wall went up, forcing the crew to move to Munich. Interiors were shot at Bavaria Film Studios. Because of issues with East German and Soviet authorities, who allowed Wilder to film on their side of Berlin only after reading the script, a full-size replica of the Brandenburg Gate was built on the back lot at the Bavaria Studios. To keep One, Two, Three current, Wilder and Diamond followed daily Berlin developments via Armed Forces Radio and the international New York Times, updating the script constantly. During principal photography, Wilder received a call from Joan Crawford, recently appointed to the board of directors of Pepsi-Cola following her husband Alfred Steele's death. In response to Crawford's protests over the use of the Coca-Cola brand in the film, Wilder scattered some references to Pepsi, including the final scene.

The theatrical release poster for the film, with a woman holding three balloons, was designed by Saul Bass. The Bass designed poster that Wilder originally intended for the film's release featured a United States style flag sticking out of a Coca-Cola-style bottle. The poster had to be replaced, however, when Coca-Cola threatened legal action against United Artists for copyright infringement.

== Soundtrack ==
Aram Khachaturian's lively "Sabre Dance" marks the moments when Mac moves into energetic action (Ingeborg's table dance at Grand Hotel Potemkin and car chase) and is also played during the opening credits. Richard Wagner's "The Ride of the Valkyries" is played on the way to the Grand Hotel Potemkin. The conductor of the orchestra sings a German language version of "Yes! We Have No Bananas" on the arrival of Mac at the Grand Hotel Potemkin.

== Release ==
When the movie opened, it came with a spoken preface by Cagney, added by Wilder:

On Sunday, August 13th, 1961, the eyes of America were on the nation's capital, where Roger Maris was hitting home runs No. 44 and 45 against the Senators. On that same day, without any warning, the East German Communists sealed off the border between East and West Berlin. I only mention this to show the kind of people we're dealing with—real shifty.

== Reception ==
=== Critical response ===
Critic Bosley Crowther applauded the work of Cagney and wrote,

With all due respect for all the others, all of whom are very good—Pamela Tiffin, a new young beauty, as Scarlett; Horst Buchholz as the East Berlin boy, Lilo Pulver as a German secretary, Leon Askin as a Communist stooge and several more—the burden is carried by Mr. Cagney, who is a good 50 per cent of the show. He has seldom worked so hard in any picture or had such a browbeating ball. His fellow is a free-wheeling rascal. His wife (Arlene Francis) hates his guts. He knows all the ways of beating the rackets and has no compunctions about their use. He is brutishly bold and brassy, wildly ingenious and glib. Mr. Cagney makes you mistrust him—but he sure makes you laugh with him. And that's about the nature of the picture. It is one with which you can laugh—with its own impudence toward foreign crises—while laughing at its rowdy spinning jokes.

Time magazine called it a "yell-mell, hard-sell, Sennett-with-a-sound-track satire of iron curtains and color lines, of people's demockeracy, Coca-Colonization, peaceful noexistence [sic], and the Deep Southern concept that all facilities are created separate but equal." Time notes Wilder "purposely neglects the high precision of hilarity that made Some Like It Hot a screwball classic and The Apartment a peerless comedy of officemanship. But in the rapid, brutal, whambam style of a man swatting flies with a pile driver, he has produced a sometimes beWildered [sic], often wonderfully funny exercise in nonstop nuttiness." The film won kudos from the staff at Variety. They wrote, "Billy Wilder's One, Two, Three is a fast-paced, high-pitched, hard-hitting, lighthearted farce crammed with topical gags and spiced with satirical overtones. Story is so furiously quick-witted that some of its wit gets snarled and smothered in overlap. But total experience packs a considerable wallop." Pauline Kael, on the other hand, dismissed the film as a tiresome succession of stale and inane gags. She was also bemused by what seemed to her the forced enthusiasm of the favorable reviews.

According to J. Hoberman, screenwriter Abby Mann (who wrote Judgment at Nuremberg) "deemed Wilder's [film] so tasteless, he felt obliged to apologize for it at the Moscow Film Festival."

On Rotten Tomatoes, the film holds a score of 88% based on 25 reviews, with the consensus reading, "Billy Wilder's One, Two, Three is an uproarious Cold War satire, offering devastating critiques of both factions with an effortless touch and a powerhouse performance from James Cagney."

=== Box office ===
One, Two, Three did not do well at either the U.S. or German box office. The lighthearted East-West Berlin story felt much more sinister at the release, since the Berlin Wall had been built after principal photography began. It earned rentals over $2 million in the US and Canada.

The film recorded a loss of $1.6 million. However, it was re-released in 1985 in France and West Germany and became a box office success, especially in West Berlin.

=== Censorship ===
One, Two, Three was banned in Finland, which had a policy of Finlandization, from 1962 to 1986 on "political" grounds — it was feared that the film would harm relations between Finland and the Soviet Union. United Pictures Finland tried to get the film released theatrically in 1962, 1966 and 1969 but it was only in 1986 that the Finnish Board of Film Classification allowed the film to be distributed.

=== Awards ===
Nominations

- Academy Awards: Oscar, Best Cinematography, Black-and-White, Daniel L. Fapp; 1962.
- Golden Globes: Golden Globe, Best Motion Picture – Comedy; Best Supporting Actress, Pamela Tiffin; 1962.
- Laurel Awards: Golden Laurel, Top Comedy, 4th place; Top Male Comedy Performance, James Cagney, 4th place; 1962.
- Writers Guild of America Awards: Best Written American Comedy (Screen), Billy Wilder and I.A.L. Diamond; 1962.

=== Homages and references ===
- The film makes several references to Cagney's earlier films, including a Cagney impression from Red Buttons, and the grapefruit-to-the-face incident from The Public Enemy. Additionally, the cuckoo clock in MacNamara's office plays "Yankee Doodle Dandy". Cagney also refers to his contemporary Edward G. Robinson by using Robinson's line "Mother of Mercy, is this the end of Rico?" from Little Caesar, which was a competitor of The Public Enemy.
- The Cold War is referenced, with one joke spoken by an apparatchik seeming to foreshadow the Cuban Missile Crisis: "We have trade agreement with Cuba: they send us cigars, we send them rockets." When Cagney's character retorts that they are "pretty crummy cigars," the Russian replies that they send the Cubans "pretty crummy rockets."
- Cagney noted that he quit Hollywood after this film due to fatigue from an inordinate number of lines in a lengthy movie helmed by a demanding Wilder and to a feeling of jealousy when he heard from a friend about to set off on a leisurely yachting trip.
- In the 2015 Steven Spielberg-directed film about an incident in the cold war, Bridge of Spies, there is a scene with a Berlin movie-house showing the film Eins, Zwei, Drei in the background.

== Re-releases ==
One, Two, Three aired on The ABC Sunday Night Movie on January 31, 1965. It was received enthusiastically in Germany upon its 1985 re-release in cinemas. One, Two, Three was given a grand re-première at a large outdoor showing in West Berlin which was broadcast simultaneously on television. The film went on to spend a year in West Berlin cinemas, where it was rediscovered by West Berlin citizens.

== See also ==
- List of American films of 1961
