= Man with the Transplanted Brain =

- Directed by: Jacques Doniol-Valcroze
- Written by: Jacques Doniol-Valcroze
- Starring: Mathieu Carrière; Nicoletta Machiavelli
- Cinematography: Étienne Becker
- Edited by: Nicole Berckmans
- Music by: Johannes Brahms
- Release date: 1972
- Countries: France; Italy; West Germany
- Language: French

Man with the Transplanted Brain (French: L'Homme au cerveau greffé, Italian: L'uomo dal cervello trapiantato) is a 1972 French-Italian-West German science fiction-drama film written and directed by Jacques Doniol-Valcroze. It is loosely based on a novel by Alain Franck and Victor Vicas.

== Plot ==
The head of a neurosurgical clinic, Professor Jean Marcilly, famous brain specialist, condemned by an incurable heart disease, pushes Dr. Robert Degagnac to transplant his brain into the young 23-year-old Franz Eckerman, a former racer and race car tester, victim of a car crash.

== Cast ==
- Mathieu Carrière as Franz Eckerman
- Nicoletta Machiavelli as Héléna
- Marianne Eggerickx as Marianne Marcilly
- Michel Duchaussoy as Dr. Robert Desagnac
- Jean-Pierre Aumont as Professor Jean Marcilly
- Martine Sarcey as Dr. Catherine Ponson
- Benoît Allemane as Costet
- Monique Mélinand as Elisabeth Marcilly
- Christian Duroc as Ferrière
- Pierre Santini as Dino
- Andrée Tainsy
