= Dominique Boschero =

French-Italian actress (born 1937)

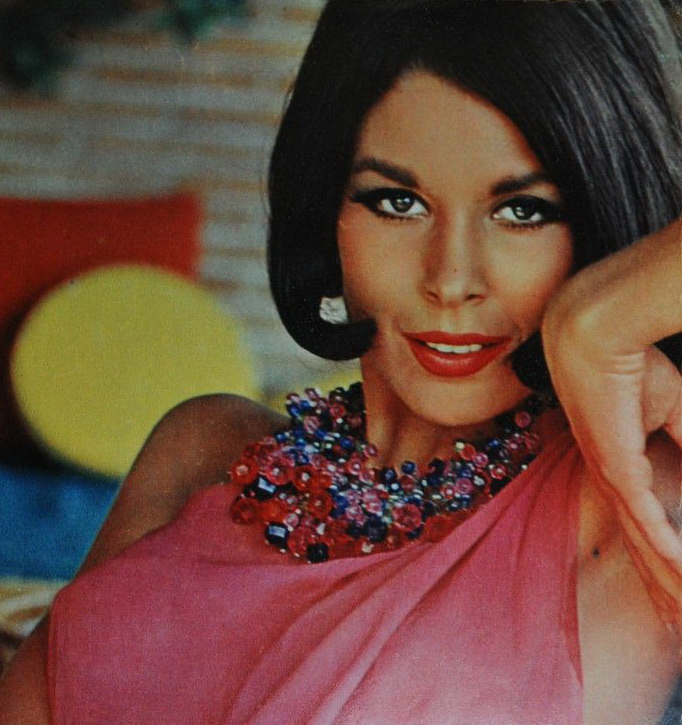
- Boschero in 1965
- Born: 27 April 1937 (age 89); Paris, France
- Occupation: Actress
- Years active: 1956–1989

Dominique Jacqueline Angèle Boschero (born 27 April 1937) is a French-Italian retired actress.

== Life and career ==
Boschero was born in Paris in 1937, the daughter of Italian parents. The surname 'Boschero' is an italianization of the Occitan surname 'Bosquier'. Shortly before the outbreak of World War II, her parents sent her to live with her grandparents in Frassino, Piedmont. She lived there until the age of 15, when she returned to Paris. She entered showbusiness as a model and a showgirl at the La Nouvelle Ève cabaret.

After debuting on stage and in films in the mid-1950s, in 1960 she moved back in Italy, where she became a star of genre films, with occasional performances in dramatic and humorous roles. In the 1970s she slowed her activities, retiring in the mid-1970s. In 1989, Boschero briefly left retirement to star in the soap opera Passioni.

In 2024, Manni published a biography of Boschero, La ragazza occitana: Vita movimentata di Dominique Boschero.

== Personal life ==
She currently lives in Frassino.

Boschero was romantically involved with actor Claudio Camaso and singer Franco Califano.

During the late, Boschero befriended French Occitan politician François Fontan.

== Selected filmography ==
- Women's Club (1956)
- The Bride Is Much Too Beautiful (1956)
- The Road to Shame (1959)
- Un dollaro di fifa (1960)
- The Hot Port of Hong Kong (1962)
- The Golden Arrow (1962)
- Ulysses Against the Son of Hercules (1962)
- Mad Sea (1963)
- The Reunion (1963)
- The Swindlers (1964)
- Full Hearts and Empty Pockets (1964)
- The Secret of the Chinese Carnation (1964)
- La donnaccia (1964)
- Secret Agent Fireball (1965)
- Spiaggia libera (1965)
- OSS 77 – Operazione fior di loto (1965)
- The Double Bed (1965)
- I Kill, You Kill (1965)
- Libido (1965)
- Ring Around the World (1966)
- Furia a Marrakech
- The Fantastic Argoman (1967)
- Fire of Love (1967)
- The Curse of Belphegor (1967)
- Train for Durango (1968)
- Between God, the Devil and a Winchester (1968)
- The Unnaturals – Contronatura (1969)
- And the Crows Will Dig Your Grave (1971)
- The Blonde in the Blue Movie (1971)
- Gang War (1971)
- Il sindacalista (1972)
- Who Saw Her Die? (1972)
- All the Colors of the Dark (1972)
- The Bloodstained Lawn (1973)
- The Lady Has Been Raped (1973)
- Lovers and Other Relatives (1974)
- Faccia di spia (1975)
