= The Almost Perfect Crime =

- Directed by: Mario Camerini
- Written by: Mario Camerini; Leonardo Benvenuti; Piero De Bernardi; Ernesto Gastaldi; Lorenzo Gicca Palli
- Produced by: Luigi Rovere
- Starring: Philippe Leroy; Pamela Tiffin; Graziella Granata
- Cinematography: Aldo Giordani
- Edited by: Tatiana Casini Morigi
- Music by: Carlo Rustichelli
- Release date: 1966
- Country: Italy

The Almost Perfect Crime (Italian: Delitto quasi perfetto), also known as The Imperfect Murder, is a 1966 Italian crime-comedy film written and directed by Mario Camerini.

== Cast ==
- Philippe Leroy as Paolo Respighi
- Pamela Tiffin as Annie Robson
- Graziella Granata as Annie #2
- Bernard Blier as Colonel Robson
- Massimo Serato as Preston
- Fernando Sancho as Omar
- Luciano Pigozzi as Salah
- Giulio Donnini as Foster
- Ignazio Leone as Mazzullo

== Release ==
The film was released in Italian cinemas in April 1966. It was released in the United Kingdom in late 1970 with the title The Imperfect Murder.

== Reception ==
The film was a box office hit in Italy and in several European countries.
