= Torture Me But Kill Me with Kisses =

- Directed by: Dino Risi
- Written by: Agenore Incrocci; Furio Scarpelli; Dino Risi
- Starring: Nino Manfredi; Ugo Tognazzi; Pamela Tiffin
- Music by: Armando Trovajoli
- Release date: 4 October 1968
- Running time: 100 min
- Country: Italy
- Language: Italian

Straziami ma di baci saziami (internationally released as Torture Me But Kill Me with Kisses) is a 1968 Italian comedy film directed by Dino Risi. The film parodies Italian photonovels and the popular subculture. It had a great commercial success. All the DVD releases (in Italy, too) have the credits in English.

== Plot ==
Marino and Marisa meet for the first time in Rome during a folklore festival. He politely chats her up, but she does not want to show any interest in him. Later that year, Marino arrives in Sacrofante Marche, Marisa's mountain village in the region Marche, where he has found a job as a barber and wants to pursue the courting of Marisa. The two fall in love and have plans for their future together, but Marisa's father does not approve of the relationship. Desperate, the two attempt suicide by laying on rail tracks, but just get scolded by the train conductor. After Marisa's dad dies of natural causes, the two can see a brighter future. Unfortunately, Marino's landlady (a widow, who fancies the young man) is jealous of their relationship and hints that Marisa once spent the night in an hotel with Guido Scortichini. Blinded by jealousy, Marino confronts Marisa who, heartbroken, leaves him and goes to Rome. Marino finds out that the landlady was lying to him and desperately starts searching for Marisa. He finds some clues about her whereabouts, but not a concrete lead. He ends up penniless and depressed wandering the streets of Rome. In the meantime, heartbroken Marisa has jumped into temporary jobs while trying to forget about Marino. She ends up working for Umberto Ciceri, a deaf and mute tailor. His kindness and sensibility make Marisa finally feel better.

Marino hits rock bottom when he decides to kill himself on New Year by jumping in the river Tiber from the bridge Cavour. But he is saved by Mr Okay and ends up in hospital. Marisa shows up to visit him having read about his suicide attempt in the newspaper. Marino is delighted to have finally found Marisa, but the joy does not last long since she is now Mrs Ciceri, after marrying her employer. She quickly leaves and Marino is "comforted" by his bed mate who uses Marino's misfortunes to come up with lottery numbers and offers to share the winning. The lottery numbers come up and they do win. Some time later, Marisa finds Marino in her husband's tailor shop. Marino is now rich and confident and wants to toy with Marisa, who he thinks wronged her. In the meantime, kind Umberto, unable to hear anything, is unaware of their previous history and gets a liking for Marino. Marisa rejects Marino but, because of his insistence, agrees to at least 'consummate' their interrupted love story. Despite not being able to go through with the passionate act, Marisa and Marino's love is re-kindled. But they can't be together while she is married to Umberto. So, they end up with an evil plan: to kill Umberto so they can be together. Disguised as a gas explosion, the murder attempt does not kill Umberto. Instead, he regains his voice and hearing. Then Umberto explains that he made a vow to his mother death bed that, if he ever regained his lost senses, he will become a monk. With his blessing, Marisa and Marino can finally be together.

== Cast ==
- Nino Manfredi: Balestrini Marino
- Pamela Tiffin: Di Giovanni Marisa
- Ugo Tognazzi: Umberto Ciceri
- Moira Orfei: Adelaide
- Gigi Ballista: Engineer
- Livio Lorenzon: Artemio Di Giovanni
- Pietro Tordi: Uncle Arduino
- Samson Burke: Scortichini Guido
- Checco Durante: The Owner of Employment Agency
