= Viva Max! =

1969 film by Jerry Paris

- 1969 film poster by Jack Davis
- Directed by: Jerry Paris
- Screenplay by: Elliott Baker
- Based on: Viva Max! 1966 novel by James Lehrer
- Produced by: Mark Carliner
- Starring: Peter Ustinov; Pamela Tiffin; Jonathan Winters; John Astin; Keenan Wynn; Harry Morgan; Alice Ghostley; Kenneth Mars
- Cinematography: Henri Persin
- Edited by: David Berlatsky; Bud Molin
- Music by: Hugo Montenegro
- Distributed by: Commonwealth United Entertainment
- Release date: December 18, 1969
- Running time: 93 minutes
- Country: United States
- Language: English

Viva Max! is a 1969 comedy film directed by Jerry Paris and starring Peter Ustinov, Jonathan Winters and John Astin. The film was written by Elliott Baker based on the 1966 novel of the same name by James Lehrer.

== Plot ==
Brigadier General Maximilian Rodrigues de Santos of the army of Mexico arrives at a United States border crossing on horseback with a small company of soldiers on foot. He claims to be leading his men to Laredo, Texas to march in a parade on George Washington's birthday. The soldiers' destination is actually San Antonio, where the general intends to carry out a quixotic mission to "re-occupy" the Alamo. None of his men are aware of his plans, but without argument they do whatever they are told by Max's devoted Sergeant Valdez.

Disguised as a tourist, Max takes a guided tour of the Alamo. In the gift shop, he encounters an attractive young blonde, Paula, who, when she isn't selling postcards, is a radical student activist. After racing through the streets of San Antonio, Max and his men seize control of the fort, taking Paula and two other Americans as their prisoners. Max places a call to the local authorities, telling police chief Sylvester that the flag of Mexico now flies above this piece of hallowed Texas ground. Sylvester doesn't take him seriously at first, but quickly discovers that Max is an actual Army general and that everything else he has claimed is true. The chief goes to the Alamo to meet Max in person, using the passwords "John Wayne" and "Richard Widmark" to gain entry. Max instructs him to contact the Pentagon and report the fort to be back under Mexico's control.

As Max will only negotiate with another general, Sylvester calls on Billy Joe Hallson, a brigadier general of the state's National Guard, whose day job is running a mattress store. Max is unimpressed. A low-level bureaucrat from Washington condescendingly promises that if Max leaves quietly, the United States will not take this "invasion" too seriously and mocks Mexico as "not exactly the Soviet Union." Max announces he will hold the Alamo for thirteen days in response to the snub.

Paula sees Max as a heroic revolutionary, but he tells her his only reason for the invasion was to impress his girlfriend back home. A three-star U.S. Army general named Lacomber arrives to take charge. A company of his men scale the wall and enter the fort, but without ammunition, so as to avoid bloodshed and an international incident. It turns out Max's men are not carrying ammo, either, but the Americans fall for Max's bluff to open fire and promptly surrender. Max celebrates by doing a Mexican hat dance.

Paula brings the general back to earth by explaining that she has learned his soldiers follow him only because Valdez shoots any who do not obey orders. Disheartened, Max decides to wave the white flag of surrender and go peacefully. A private anti-communist militia, who think Max is a front for the Chinese, arrives just as Max is surrendering to Lacomber. Their leader, whose aunt is one of the hostages, shoots Max in the shoulder. Max bravely orders his unarmed men to attack the armed militia. His men, for the first time, willingly follow his orders and the militia flee as their leader is arrested.

Max then tells the U.S. authorities that he intends to "advance"—to Mexico. Satisfied at that, Sylvester, Lacomber and Hallson let Max ride away. He rides out of town triumphantly with his men chanting proudly: "Viva Max!"

== Cast ==
- Peter Ustinov as General Maximillian Rodrigo De Santos aka Max
- Pamela Tiffin as Paula Whitland
- Jonathan Winters as General Billy Joe Hallson
- John Astin as Sergeant Valdez
- Keenan Wynn as General Lacomber
- Harry Morgan as Chief Sylvester
- Alice Ghostley as Hattie
- Larry Hankin as Pedro Romero
- Kenneth Mars as Sam Gillison
- Ann Morgan Guilbert as Edna Miller
- Bill McCutcheon as Desmond Miller
- Gino Conforti as Contreras
- Christopher Ross as Gomez
- Paul Sand as Moreno
- Don Diamond as Hernandez
- Jack Colvin as Garcia
- Jessica Myerson as Mrs. Dodd
- Ted Gehring as Customs Guard Collins
- Jim B. Smith as Customs Guard Michaels
- Eldon Quick as Quincy

== Music ==
The film's musical styles drift back and forth between the sound of the 'invading' army's military band and the late-1960's pop groove, the former during scenes focusing on the movement of Max's forces, and the latter during wider views of the invaders as seen within the surrounding activity of everyday American life going on all around them. The film credits the music to Hugo Montenegro along with the duo of Ralph Dino & John Sembello, with the ostentatious trumpet solos by virtuoso Al Hirt.

== Production ==
A controversy occurred when The Daughters of the Republic of Texas objected to the filming of the Alamo to the point of staging protests on location. This caused some scenes to be filmed at an Alamo replica in Brackettville, Texas and interior shots at studios in Italy instead of in San Antonio at the actual Alamo.

== Release ==
The film premiered in San Antonio, Texas on December 18, 1969.

== See also ==
- List of American films of 1969
