= The Price of Death =

1971 film

- DVD cover art
- Directed by: Lorenzo Gicca Palli
- Written by: Lorenzo Gicca Palli
- Produced by: Albano Ingrami
- Starring: Klaus Kinski; Gianni Garko
- Cinematography: Franco Villa
- Edited by: Maurizio Tedesco
- Music by: Mario Migliardi
- Release date: 17 September 1971
- Running time: 99 minutes
- Country: Italy
- Language: Italian

The Price of Death (Italian: Il venditore di morte) is a 1971 Italian Western film directed by Lorenzo Gicca Palli and starring Klaus Kinski and Gianni Garko. Some DVD releases use the title Der Galgen wartet schon, Amigo!.

== Plot ==
Silver, who is elegantly dressed and lives in a hacienda with beautiful senoritas, is hired to find out if the accused Chester Conway, the black sheep of the town, really is guilty of the murder charge that he is to hang for. By investigating clues and arranging a trap, Silver discloses some respected citizens as the guilty parties. However, when Conway is released Silver shows that he had raped and killed a Mexican girl while the murder he was charged with took place, and he kills Conway in a duel.

== Cast ==
- Gianni Garko as Silver
- Klaus Kinski as Chester Conway
- Gely Genka as Polly
- Franco Abbiana as Jeff Plummer
- Luciano Catenacci as Sheriff Tom Stanton
- Laura Gianoli as Polly's sister
- Giancarlo Prete as Reverend Adam Tiller
- Luigi Casellato as Abacuc Randall
- Luciano Pigozzi as Doctor Rosenthal
- Franca De Stratis as Carmen
- Andrea Scotti as the prosecutor's lawyer
- Alfredo Rizzo as Judge Atwell
- Giuseppe Castellano as Grant

== Reception ==
In his investigation of narrative structures in Spaghetti Western films, Fridlund ranges The Price of Death among Spaghetti Westerns heavily influenced by secret-agent films, because the hero is shown in company with beautiful women and in luxurious surroundings, works to uncover a mystery and - unlike the protagonists in A Fistful of Dollars and Django - does not have any complicating secondary motive.

== Release ==
Wild East announced they would be releasing "The Price of Death" on DVD in a double feature with Killer Caliber 32. The release was canceled due to rights issues. Killer Caliber 32 is now scheduled to be released in a double feature with Killer Adios instead.
