= Lorenzo Gicca Palli =

Italiam film director (1929–1997)

Lorenzo Gicca Palli (Rome, 1929 – Rome, 1997) was an Italian screenwriter and director. He often used the pseudonym Vincent Thomas.

== Filmography ==
=== Director and screenwriter ===
- Giorni di sangue (1968)
- Blackie the Pirate (1971, under the name Vincent Thomas)
- The Price of Death (1971, under the name Vincent Thomas)
- Liebes Lager (1976, under the name Vincent Thomas)

=== Director ===
- Primo tango a Roma – Storia d'amore e d'alchimia (1973, under the name Vincent Thomas)

=== Screenwriter ===
- The Road to Fort Alamo, directed by Mario Bava (1964)
- Una voglia da morire, directed by Duccio Tessari (1965)
- Hercules the Avenger, directed by Maurizio Lucidi (1965)
- A Question of Honour, directed by Luigi Zampa (1965)
- The Almost Perfect Crime, directed by Mario Camerini (1966)
- È mezzanotte... butta giù il cadavere, directed by Guido Zurli (1966)
- Killer Caliber .32, directed by Alfonso Brescia (1967)
- Silenzio: si uccide, directed by Guido Zurli (1967)
- Thompson 1880, directed by Guido Zurli (1968)
- Hell in Normandy, directed by Alfonso Brescia (1968)
- Death on High Mountain, directed by Fernando Cerchio (1969)
- Uccidete Rommel, directed by Alfonso Brescia (1969)
- La notte dei serpenti, directed by Giulio Petroni (1969)
- Zorro il dominatore, directed by José Luis Merino (1969)
- Zorro, la maschera della vendetta, directed by José Luis Merino (1971)
- La furia dei Kyber, directed by José Luis Merino (1971)
- The Hassled Hooker, directed by Eriprando Visconti (1972)

=== Actor ===
- The Mirror Crack'd from Side to Side, directed by Guido Zurli (1967)
