= The Lady Has Been Raped =

1973 comedy film

- Directed by: Vittorio Sindoni
- Written by: Ghigo De Chiara
- Produced by: Vittorio Sindoni; Roel Bos
- Starring: Pamela Tiffin; Carlo Giuffré; Enrico Montesano
- Cinematography: Safai Teherani
- Edited by: Maurizio Faggiani
- Music by: Grenfield and Cook
- Distributed by: P.A.C.
- Release date: 1973
- Country: Italy
- Language: Italian

The Lady Has Been Raped (Italian: La signora è stata violentata) is a 1973 comedy film directed by Vittorio Sindoni and starring Pamela Tiffin and Carlo Giuffré.

== Cast ==
- Pamela Tiffin as Pamela Traversi
- Carlo Giuffré as Sandro Traversi
- Enrico Montesano as Father O'Connor
- Ninetto Davoli as Palla
- Gigi Ballista as Parini
- Dominique Boschero as Viviane
- Leopoldo Trieste as Professor Barone
- Giuseppe Maffioli as Professor Valenti
- Franco Fabrizi as the photographer
- Luciano Salce as the bishop
- Armando Bandini as Lama
- Enzo Robutti as the private investigator
- Angela Pagano as the prostitute
- Consuelo Pilar as Parini's wife
- Shamsuddin Abul Kalam as Dr. Samai
- Giuliano Sestili as Mr. Martino
- Liù Bosisio as Miss Valenti
- Orazio Stracuzzi as Alvaro
- Gino Pagnani as Tommasino
- Willy Moser as Patrick
- Carla Mancini as the nun

== Production ==
The film was produced by Vittorio Sindoni with actor Glenn Saxson, here credited with his birth name Roel Bos. It was shot between Rome and Amsterdam. It marked the second collaboration between Sindoni and Pamela Tiffin. Tiffin used a body-double in her nude scenes. It also was the first film of Enrico Montesano following the termination of his contract with Dino De Laurentiis and the ensuing lawsuit.

== Release ==
The film was released in Italian cinemas by P.A.C. in November 1973.

== Reception ==
The film was a surprise box office success, grossing over 894 million lire. It was generally badly received by critics. Paolo Mereghetti panned it, describing it as "a farce that aims to satirize masculine insecurities and consequences of Catholic upbringing, [...] but the screenplay [...] goes no further than a few easy misunderstandings about infidelity and cassocks, and the all-too-easy availability of women.".
