= Train for Durango =

1968 film

- Directed by: Mario Caiano
- Written by: Mario Caiano; José Gutiérrez Maesso; Duccio Tessari
- Starring: Anthony Steffen; Mark Damon; Dominique Boschero; Enrico Maria Salerno
- Cinematography: Enzo Barboni
- Edited by: Renato Cinquini
- Music by: Carlo Rustichelli
- Release date: 1968
- Country: Italy
- Language: Italian

Train for Durango (Italian: Un treno per Durango) is a 1968 Italian Spaghetti Western film directed by Mario Caiano.

== Plot ==
Mexico, during the revolution. Some bandits attack a train and steal a safe. Two adventurous friends, the American Gringo and the Mexican Lucas, witness the theft and set out to track down the outlaws, hoping to seize the loot. Gringo and Lucas, however, encounter countless unexpected events, from which a mysterious individual will save them in the most critical situations. The two adventurers finally track down the safe in the bandits' hideout and manage to steal the gold, but the strange individual reappears, identifying himself as a captain of the American army charged with recovering the stolen gold. The captain seizes the gold and leaves. Gringo and Lucas, however, discover that the captain is merely a con man and set out to track him down. The con man accepts the offer to split the loot, but by deceiving them once again, manages to disappear with the gold.

== Cast ==
- Anthony Steffen as El Gringo
- Mark Damon as Brown
- Dominique Boschero as Helen MacPherson
- Enrico Maria Salerno as Lucas
- Roberto Camardiel as Lobo
- José Bódalo as Mexican Boss
- Manuel Zarzo as Heraclio
- Aldo Sambrell as Mexikanischer Captain
- Lorenzo Robledo as Pinkerton-Angestellter
- Tito García as Don Pedro Arista
- Rafael Albaicín as Lobo Henchman
- Simón Arriaga as Lobo Henchman
- José Canalejas as Manuel, Lobo Henchman
- Gonzalo de Esquiroz
- Goyo Lebrero as Gonzalez
- José Manuel Martín as Revolutionary
- Francisco Nieto
- Joaquín Parra as Lobo Henchman
