= The Protagonists (1968 film) =

1968 film

- Film poster
- Directed by: Marcello Fondato
- Written by: Ennio Flaiano; Marcello Fondato
- Produced by: Ugo Guerra; Elio Scardamaglia
- Starring: Sylva Koscina
- Cinematography: Marcello Gatti
- Edited by: Tatiana Casini Morigi
- Music by: Luis Enríquez Bacalov
- Release date: 1968
- Country: Italy
- Language: Italian

The Protagonists (Italian: I protagonisti) is a 1968 Italian drama film directed by Marcello Fondato. It was listed to compete at the 1968 Cannes Film Festival, but the festival was cancelled due to the events of May 1968 in France.

== Cast ==
- Sylva Koscina as Nancy
- Jean Sorel as Roberto
- Pamela Tiffin as Gabriella
- Lou Castel as Taddeu
- Luigi Pistilli as Tassoni
- Maurizio Bonuglia as Nino
- Giovanni Petrucci as Carlo
- Gabriele Ferzetti as Il Commissario
- Renato Romano
- Massimo Sarchielli
- Claudio Trionfi
- Paola Corinti
- Paolo Luciani
