= Garter Colt =

1968 film

- Directed by: Gian Andrea Rocco
- Written by: Giovanni Gigliozzi; Brunello Maffei; Vittorio Pescatori; Gian Andrea Rocco
- Produced by: Giovanni Vari; Nicoletta Machiavelli - Brandino Rangoni Machiavelli
- Starring: Nicoletta Machiavelli; Claudio Camaso
- Cinematography: Gino Santini
- Edited by: Mario Salvatori
- Music by: Giovanni Fusco; Gianfranco Plenizio
- Release date: 19 May 1968
- Running time: 102 min
- Country: Italy
- Language: Italian

Garter Colt (Italian: Giarrettiera Colt) is a 1968 Italian spaghetti Western directed by Gian Andrea Rocco. It is one of the rare Italo-Westerns with a woman as lead character and was shot in Sardinia at a town named San Salvatore di Sinis.

== Plot ==
At the Mexico–United States border, a brave young woman defends herself from the attack of the fearsome bandit, "Red", mastering a gun and the game of poker. Falling in love with a young Frenchman, he asks her to give up gambling and start a quiet and normal life, but when the young man is abducted by "Red", she is determined to seek revenge.

== Cast ==
- Nicoletta Machiavelli as Lulu, - Giarrettiera Colt
- Claudio Camaso (Claudio Volonté) as Red
- Marisa Solinas as Rosie
- Yorgo Voyagis as Benito Juarez/Carlos
- Walter Barnes as General Droga
- Gaspare Zola as Emperor Maximilian/Jean
- Silvana Bacci
- Franco Bucceri as the Doctor
- Elvira Cortese as Elvira
- James Martin as Sheriff
- Giovanni Ivan Scratuglia as Roger
