= The Blonde in the Blue Movie =

- Directed by: Steno
- Written by: Giulio Scarnicci; Steno; Raimondo Vianello
- Starring: Lando Buzzanca; Pamela Tiffin
- Cinematography: Angelo Filippini
- Edited by: Ruggero Mastroianni
- Music by: Armando Trovajoli
- Release date: 1971
- Running time: 106 minutes
- Country: Italy
- Language: Italian

The Blonde in the Blue Movie (Italian: Il vichingo venuto dal sud, also known as No One Will Notice You're Naked and The Viking Who Came from the South) is a 1971 Italian comedy film directed by Steno.

== Cast ==
- Lando Buzzanca as Rosario Trapanese
- Pamela Tiffin as Karen
- Gigi Ballista as Silvio Borelon
- Renzo Marignano as Gustav Larsen
- Rita Forzano as Ilse
- Ferdy Mayne as Professor Grutekoor
- Steffen Zacharias as Bosen
- Dominique Boschero as Priscilla
- Elizabeth Turner as Eva Gret
- Victoria Zinny as Luisa
- Nino Terzo as man at sex shop

== Production ==
During filming, Pamela Tiffin reportedly experienced difficulties with leading actor Lando Buzzanca, whose persistent attempts to seduce her led her to complain to the producers. Tiffin used a body-double in most of her nude scenes.

== Reception ==
Domestically, the film was a hit, grossing over 1,750,000,000 lire and becoming the 17th highest grossing movie of the year.

== See also ==
- List of Italian films of 1971
