= Faccia di spia =

- Directed by: Giuseppe Ferrara
- Cinematography: Mario Masini
- Music by: Manos Hatzidakis
- Release date: 1975
- Country: Italy
- Language: Italian

Faccia di spia (also known as C.I.A. Secret Story) is a 1975 Italian political drama film written and directed by Giuseppe Ferrara.

== Cast ==
- Ugo Bologna as Salvador Allende
- Adalberto Maria Merli as Captain Felix Ramos
- Mariangela Melato as Tania
- Francisco Rabal as Mehdi Ben Barka
- Riccardo Cucciolla as Giuseppe Pinelli
- Claudio Camaso as Che Guevara
- George Ardisson as Patrick
- Ugo Bologna as Salvador Allende
- Dominique Boschero as Licia Pinelli
- Lou Castel as the torturer
- Gérard Landry as Mr. Rutherford

== Production ==
Lou Castel claimed that in one scene director Giuseppe Ferrara wanted him to penetrate Mimma Biscardi, the actress playing the tortured woman (who, according to him, was even drugged during filming) with a prosthetic penis.
