= Pamela Tiffin =

American actress and model (1942–2020)

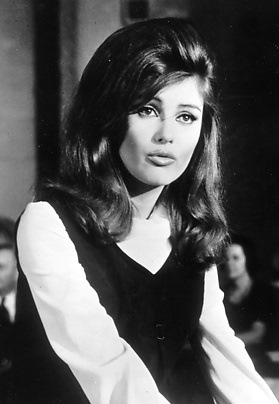
- Tiffin in 1965
- Born: Pamela Tiffin Wonso; October 13, 1942; Oklahoma City, Oklahoma, U.S.
- Died: December 2, 2020 (aged 78); Manhattan, New York City, U.S.
- Education: Hunter College
- Occupations: Actress; model
- Years active: 1960–1989
- Known for: Summer and Smoke; One, Two, Three; State Fair; Come Fly with Me; Harper
- Spouses: Clay Felker (m. 1962; div. 1969); Edmondo Danon (m. 1974)
- Children: 2

Pamela Tiffin Wonso (October 13, 1942 – December 2, 2020) was an American actress and model. She was a two-time Golden Globe Award nominee, New Star of the Year – Actress for Summer and Smoke and Best Supporting Actress – Motion Picture for One, Two, Three. She also won a Theatre World Award for her performance in the Broadway play Dinner at Eight.

== Early life and modeling career ==
Tiffin was born in Oklahoma City to architect Stanley Wonso and Grace Irene (Tiffin) Wonso. She was of Russian, Scottish and British ancestry. She grew up in Oak Lawn, Illinois, and studied tap and interpretive dance at the Gertrude Morgan School of Dancing in Chicago from the age of four until eleven. She started modeling at the age of 12 with the Models Bureau agency, her first assignment being for 7 Up.

In 1959, Tiffin moved with her mother to New York, where she attended night classes at Hunter College.

After initially signing with the Frances Gill Agency, her modeling career took off when she switched to the Plaza Five Agency. She began her acting career after fashion photographer Lloyd Fromm encouraged her to meet Boris Kaplan, a casting director at Paramount Pictures. She made her official debut in Music of Williamsburg, a short film directed by Sidney Meyers. In the same period, she started frequently appearing on Vogue, and collaborated with famed photographers Mark Shaw and Horst P. Horst.

== Acting career ==
=== Hollywood ===
During Thanksgiving 1960, while vacationing in Los Angeles with a group of friends, Tiffin visited the Paramount Pictures lot and was spotted by producer Hal B. Wallis, who persuaded her, despite her initial reluctance, to take a screen test. As a result, she was cast in the film version of Summer and Smoke, directed by Peter Glenville. Shortly later, she signed a 7-years contract with 20th Century-Fox, which contemplated one picture per year for $8,000, plus the option to cast her in three additional films, and a contract with Hal B. Wallis.

Tiffin next played the daughter of James Cagney's boss in the comedy One, Two, Three (1961). The film's director Billy Wilder had spotted her in an ad in The New York Times, and cast her immediately after her audition. He called her "the biggest find since Audrey Hepburn". She earned a Golden Globe nomination for each of her first two films,

She won the leading role in the Twentieth Century-Fox musical remake State Fair (1962), in which she played Bobby Darin's love interest. Later, she was attached to a series of projects that never got off the ground, including an adaptation of Camelot with Laurence Olivier, and the main role in A Rage to Live, which was postponed and eventually shot in 1965 with Suzanne Pleshette; she was also offered the role of Tamiko in John Sturges' A Girl Named Tamiko, was considered for Tippi Hedren's role in Hitchcock's The Birds, and turned down a role in the Elvis Presley vehicle Girls! Girls! Girls!. She eventually was chosen as one of the three leads in MGM's comedy Come Fly with Me (1963).

Tiffin later studied at New York's Columbia University and continued to model. She made her television debut as a "Special Guest Star" on The Girl from Little Egypt, an episode of The Fugitive, and filmed a television pilot for Fox titled Three in Manhattan that did not materialize into a series. Tiffin agreed to take part only after Fox assured her she would be released from her contract after one more film. The pilot, which also starred Julie Newmar, Thelma Ritter's daughter Monica Moran and Jody McCrea, was eventually broadcast as an episode of the anthology series Vacation Playhouse.

Following her TV work, Tiffin refused the female lead in Fun in Acapulco, and was considered for the Sandra Dee role in Take Her, She's Mine and for the Yvette Mimieux role in Toys in the Attic. She made two films with James Darren, both aimed at teen audiences: For Those Who Think Young (1964) and The Lively Set (1964). Fox cast her in The Pleasure Seekers (1964), a remake of Three Coins in the Fountain (1954). She later co-starred with Burt Lancaster in the 1965 Western The Hallelujah Trail.

After a series of professional disappointments, having failed to secure several roles she was considered for and deeply wanted, notably in The Great Race, Who's Afraid of Virginia Woolf?, The Collector, and The Group, Tiffin appeared in her most successful film, Harper (1966) alongside Paul Newman.

=== Italy ===
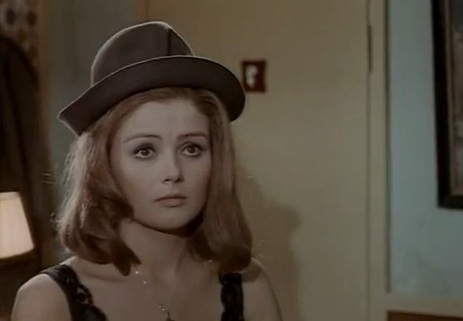
Tiffin in Torture Me But Kill Me with Kisses (1968)

Immediately after the Harper shootings wrapped, Tiffin was chosen by producer Carlo Ponti to replace Sue Lyon in a segment of the Italian anthology film Kiss the Other Sheik, alongside Marcello Mastroianni. Shortly thereafter, she starred opposite Philippe Leroy in another Italian production, the comedic thriller The Almost Perfect Crime (1966), which was a box office success and helped establish her as a major star in the Italian film industry. Returned to New York, she appeared as herself in the Brian De Palma's short documentary The Responsive Eye, and made her stage debut playing Kitty Packard in Dinner at Eight on Broadway. For her performance, she received a Theatre World Award.

In 1967, Tiffin returned to Italy for some re-shoots of Kiss the Other Sheik. In October 1967, with her marriage in crisis, she finally decided to relocate to Rome "to find out what I want." She then appeared in The Protagonists (1968); Torture Me But Kill Me with Kisses (1968), a hugely popular comedy; and The Archangel (1969) with Vittorio Gassman.

Following a two-year break, Tiffin briefly returned to appear in some American productions, guest-starring in the final episode of the ABC series The Survivors, which was shot in the French Riviera and aired in January 1970, and playing a liberal college student and the love interest to Peter Ustinov in the comedy Viva Max! (1969), which was shot between San Antonio and Cinecittà in Rome. After filming concluded, she performed in Uncle Vanya at the Mark Taper Forum in Los Angeles; Harold Clurman served as director, while the cast also included Richard Basehart, Joseph Wiseman, and Lois Smith.

The February 1969 issue of Playboy included a photo feature titled "A Toast to Tiffin". Photos in the magazine actually were test shots for The Libertine, a Pasquale Festa Campanile's film Tiffin ultimately passed, being replaced by Catherine Spaak; the shots were not supposed to be published, and Tiffin considered a lawsuit, but then decided against it to avoid attracting more attention and publicity to them.

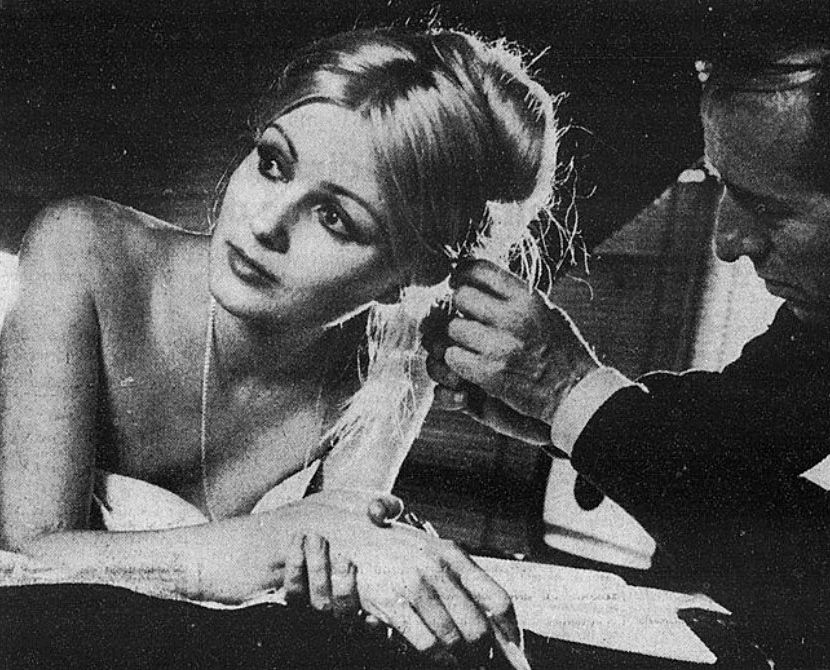
Tiffin on the set of the 1971 Italian giallo film The Fifth Cord

In 1970, Tiffin returned to Italy; she first starred in Roma '70, an unfinished art film about the student movement directed by Francesco Maselli. She later appeared in two comedies by Steno, Gang War (1971) and the highly successful The Blonde in the Blue Movie (1971). She was then paired with Franco Nero in two films, the giallo The Fifth Cord (1971) and the Spaghetti Western Deaf Smith & Johnny Ears (1973). Between these two, she starred in E se per caso una mattina... (1972), a low-budget film by Vittorio Sindoni about the hippie movement, which she agreed to shoot for free as a favor to a producer friend.

In 1973, following the Manila-shot drama by Franco Prosperi Kill Me, My Love! with Giancarlo Prete and Farley Granger, she had her final hit with the dark comedy The Lady Has Been Raped, again directed by Vittorio Sindoni. Her last film before her retirement was the Sindoni-produced comedy Brigitte, Laura, Ursula, Monica, Raquel, Litz, Florinda, Barbara, Claudia, e Sofia le chiamo tutte... anima mia, starring Orazio Orlando, which was released in 1974.

== Semi-retirement and later years ==
In 1973, after considering but eventually refusing to appear in the Giancarlo Giannini vehicle The Sensual Man, Tiffin decided to leave Rome and move back to New York. In 1982, she appeared in the PBS special The Film Society of Lincoln Center: A Tribute to Billy Wilder. Two years later, she was interviewed in the documentary film Dolce Cinema.

In 1986, during a vacation in Italy, Tiffin was encouraged by director Tomaso Sherman to come out of her 12-years-long retirement and play Nino Castelnuovo's wife and Valerie Perrine's friend in the television film Rose. In 1989, she announced she was ready to return to acting, but no offers followed. Her last credit was the 2003 documentary Abel Ferrara: Not Guilty, in which she made an appearance alongside her daughter Echo Danon.

== Personal life ==
Tiffin married twice. Her first marriage was to Clay Felker, an American magazine editor, whom she married in 1962 and divorced in 1969. Her second marriage was to Edmondo Danon, a philosopher, and the son of Italian film producer Marcello Danon. They married in 1974 and had two daughters, Echo and Aurora.

=== Death ===
Tiffin died on December 2, 2020, in a Manhattan hospital at the age of 78 from natural causes.

== Filmography ==
- Summer and Smoke, directed by Peter Glenville (1961)
- One, Two, Three, directed by Billy Wilder (1961)
- State Fair, directed by José Ferrer (1962)
- Come Fly with Me, directed by Henry Levin (1963)
- For Those Who Think Young, directed by Leslie H. Martinson (1964)
- The Lively Set, directed by Jack Arnold (1964)
- The Pleasure Seekers, directed by Jean Negulesco (1964)
- The Hallelujah Trail, directed by John Sturges (1965)
- Kiss the Other Sheik, directed by Luciano Salce (1965)
- Harper, directed by Jack Smight (1966)
- The Almost Perfect Crime, directed by Mario Camerini (1966)
- The Protagonists, directed by Marcello Fondato (1968)
- Torture Me But Kill Me with Kisses, directed by Dino Risi (1968)
- The Archangel, directed by Giorgio Capitani (1969)
- Viva Max, directed by Jerry Paris (1969)
- Gang War, directed by Steno (1971)
- The Blonde in the Blue Movie, directed by Steno (1971)
- The Fifth Cord, directed by Luigi Bazzoni (1971)
- E se per caso una mattina..., directed by Vittorio Sindoni (1972)
- Deaf Smith & Johnny Ears, directed by Paolo Cavara (1973)
- Kill Me, My Love!, directed by Franco Prosperi (1973)
- The Lady Has Been Raped, directed by Vittorio Sindoni (1973)
- Brigitte, Laura, Ursula, Monica, Raquel, Litz, Maria, Florinda, Barbara, Claudia e Sofia, le chiamo tutte anima mia, directed by Mauro Ivaldi (1974)

== Awards and nominations ==
Award	Year	Category	Work	Result
Golden Globe Award	1962	Most Promising Female Newcomer	Summer and Smoke	Nominated
Golden Globe Award	1962	Best Supporting Actress	One, Two, Three	Nominated
Laurel Award	1962	Top Female New Personality	—N/a	Nominated
Theatre World Award	1967	—N/a	Dinner at Eight	Won
