= Gang War (1971 film) =

- Directed by: Steno
- Written by: Steno; Roberto Amoroso; Roberto Gianviti; Aldo Fabrizi
- Produced by: Roberto Amoroso
- Starring: Carlo Giuffrè; Pamela Tiffin
- Cinematography: Carlo Carlini
- Edited by: Antonietta Zita
- Music by: Manuel De Sica
- Distributed by: Variety Distribution
- Release date: 1971
- Language: Italian

Gang War (Italian: Cose di Cosa Nostra), also known as Godfather of Crime, is a 1971 crime comedy film co-written and directed by Steno and starring Carlo Giuffrè, Pamela Tiffin, Vittorio De Sica, Aldo Fabrizi, Jean-Claude Brialy and Salvo Randone.

== Plot ==
Don Calogero Bertuccione, a boss of the Italian American mafia, through his right arm Don Cefalù, orders the young mafioso Salvatore Lo Coco, a Sicilian emigrated to the US, to return to his hometown Castropizzi to kill Don Nicola Manzano called "Nicky" who's suspected of being a spy. Salvatore does not want to, but must obey to avoid mafia's revenge on his family. Once he arrives in Italy he looks for someone who can replace him, but without success. After a series of grotesque events he manages to enter Don Manzano's villa where he then finds out that Don Bertuccione and his men have been killed.

== Cast ==
- Carlo Giuffrè as Salvatore Lo Coco
- Pamela Tiffin as Carmela Lo Coco
- Jean-Claude Brialy as Domenico "Mimì" Gargiulo
- Aldo Fabrizi as Aldo Panzarani
- Salvo Randone as Don Nicola "Nicky" Manzano
- Vittorio De Sica as Lawyer Michele Cannavale
- Agnès Spaak as Manzano's Lover
- Mario Feliciani as Don Cefalù
- Mario Brega as Bevilacqua
- Nino Vingelli as Pasquale
- Enzo Cannavale as The Priest
- Angela Luce as Domenico's girlfriend
- Nicoletta Elmi as Mary, the daughter of Salvatore and Carmela

== Release ==
The film was released domestically in 1971, grossing 553,442,000 lire. An American release was announced the same year with the title The Godson, but never materialized. The film was eventually released in the United States by Independent-International Pictures Corp. in 1975, following the success of The Godfather and The Godfather Part II, with the titles Gang War and Godfather of Crime.
