= Fire of Love (1967 film) =

- Directed by: Georges Combret
- Written by: Michel Dubosc; Georges Combret
- Produced by: Georges Combret
- Starring: Achille Zavatta; Dominique Boschero; Noëlle Noblecourt
- Cinematography: Pierre Lebon
- Edited by: Louis Devaivre
- Music by: Camille Sauvage
- Production companies: Pamec Cinematografica; Radius Productions
- Release date: 28 April 1967
- Running time: 95 minutes
- Countries: France; Italy
- Language: French

Fire of Love (French: Le feu de Dieu) is a 1967 French-Italian drama film directed by Georges Combret and starring Achille Zavatta, Dominique Boschero and Noëlle Noblecourt.

== Cast ==
- Achille Zavatta as Pierre Michaux
- Dominique Boschero as Monique
- Noëlle Noblecourt as Colette
- René Dary as Marois
- Claudio Camaso as Jean-Louis
- Jean Maley
- Maurice Sarfati as Michel

== Bibliography ==
- Philippe Rège. Encyclopedia of French Film Directors, Volume 1. Scarecrow Press, 2009.
