= List of spaghetti Westerns =

This list of spaghetti Westerns includes Western films, primarily produced and directed by Italian production companies between 1913 and 1978. For a list of non-Italian produced European Westerns, see the list of Euro-Western films.

In the 1960s, the spaghetti Western genre grew in popularity. Films, particularly those of the influential Dollars trilogy, spawned numerous films of the same ilk and often with similar titles, particularly from the mid to late 1960s and early 1970s. By the end of the 1970s, spaghetti Westerns had lost their following among mainstream cinema audiences and the production had ground to a virtual halt.

== List by release date ==
Title	Director	Summary	Released	Notes
Pre-1963
Indian Vampire/La vampira indiana	Roberto Roberti	Italian production. Silent Western in black-and-white.	December 1913 (Italy)	
Girl of the Golden West/Una signora dell'Ovest	Carl Koch	Italian production. Western in black-and-white.	9 February 1942 (Italy)	Based on the novel La Dame de l'Ouest, by Pierre Benoit.
Il fanciullo del West	Giorgio Ferroni	Italian production. Western comedy in black-and-white.	24 December 1942 (Italy)	
Buffalo Bill a Roma	Giuseppe Accatino	Italian production in black-and-white. Set in Italy 1905. With Enzo Fiermonte as Buffalo Bill	21 January 1950 (Italy)	
Io sono il capataz	Giorgio Simonelli	Italian production. Western comedy in black-and-white.	28 February 1951 (Italy)	
Il bandolero stanco	Fernando Cerchio	Italian production. Western comedy in black-and-white.	14 November 1952 (Italy)	
The Sheriff/La sceriffa	Roberto Bianchi Montero (as R.M. White)	Italian production. Western comedy in black-and-white. A sheriff is killed and his widow (Tina Pica) takes up his job to find the killers. With Italian comedy star Ugo Tognazzi.	16 August 1959 (Italy)	
Terror of Oklahoma/Il terrore dell'Oklahoma	Mario Amendola	Italian production. Western comedy in black-and-white.	30 October 1959 (Italy)	The title is a hybrid between the original title of the movie The Oklahoma Kid and its rendering for the Italian audience: "Il terrore dell'Ovest".
Dollar of Fear/Un dollaro di fifa	Giorgio Simonelli	Italian production. Western comedy.	28 August 1960 (Italy)	
I magnifici tre	Giorgio Simonelli	Italian production. Western comedy featuring: Walter Chiari, Ugo Tognazzi and Raimondo Vianello.	10 November 1961 (Italy)	
Due contro tutti	Alberto De Martino, Antonio Momplet	Italian/Spanish production. Western comedy featuring Walter Chiari.	4 December 1962 (Italy)	
1963
Tres hombres buenos	Joaquín Luis Romero Marchent	Spanish/Italian production. Cesare Guzman (Geoffrey Horne) hunts the men who murdered his wife. He is joined by a Brazilian (Robert Hundar) and a boisterous Mexican (Fernando Sancho).	16 May 1963 (Italy)	
Gunfight at Red Sands/Gringo/Duello nel Texas	Ricardo Blasco	Spanish/Italian production. Racism against Mexicans in the United States is a theme in this story of how Gringo (Richard Harrison) hunts down those responsible for killing his foster father.	19 September 1963 (Italy)	Based on a short story by James Donald Prindle
Heroes of the West/Gli eroi del West/Los héroes del Oeste	Steno	Italian/Spanish production. Western comedy featuring Walter Chiari and Raimondo Vianello.	11 December 1963 (Italy)	
1964
Gunfight at High Noon/El sabor de la venganza/I tre spietati	Joaquín Luis Romero Marchent	Spanish/Italian production. Chris Walker (Robert Hundar) becomes an outlaw and his brother, Jeff (Richard Harrison), a police commissioner in Vera Cruz. They confront each other over the fate of the man who murdered their father.	8 February 1964 (Italy)	
Brandy/Ride and Kill/Cavalca e uccidi	José Luis Borau/Mario Caiano	Italian/Spanish production. An early spaghetti Western comedy, starring Alex Nicol as Brandy, a town drunk who is hired by corrupt officials to replace the local sheriff, after he is killed by their hired gunman (Claudio Undari).	30 April 1964 (Italy)	Awards: Winner of the "Antonio Barbero" Revelation Award at the 1965 Cinema Writers Circle Awards for Best Director (José Luis Borau)
Man of the Cursed Valley/L'uomo della valle maledetta/El hombre del valle maldito	Siro Marcellini	Italian/Spanish production.	22 May 1964 (Italy)	
Grand Canyon massacre/Massacro al Grande Canyon	Albert Band/Sergio Corbucci	Italian production. Former sheriff Wes Evans (James Mitchum) gets reluctantly involved in a feud between two big ranchers.	25 May 1964 (Italy)	
Cuatro balazos/Il vendicatore di Kansas City/Shots Ring Out!	Agustin Navarro	Italian/Spanish production. Gunfighter Frank Dalton (Paul Piaget) and the sheriff (Fernando Casanova) seek the real culprit of a murder pinned on Dalton's sister.	29 June 1964 (Italy)	
Two Mafiamen in the Far West/Due mafiosi nel Far West/Los pistoleros de la muerte	Giorgio Simonelli	Italian/Spanish production. Comedy Western, featuring Franco and Ciccio.	30 June 1964 (Italy)	
Bullets Don't Argue/Le pistole non discutono/Las pistolas no discuten/Die letzten Zwei vom Rio Bravo	Mario Caiano	Italian/Spanish/West German production. Sheriff Pat Garrett (Rod Cameron) goes to Mexico to bring back two bank robbers and their loot. Returning through the desert, they are stalked by bandits.	21 August 1964 (Italy)	
A Fistful of Dollars/Per un pugno di dollari/Por un puñado de dólares/Für eine Handvoll Dollar	Sergio Leone	Italian/Spanish/West German production. The Man With No Name, a mysterious drifter (Clint Eastwood) arrives in a small town controlled by two warring gangs of smugglers. He plays one side against the other to make money, but is found out when he helps the captive Marisol (Marianne Koch) and her victimized family to escape.	12 September 1964 (Italy)	Awards: 1 Silver Ribbon for Best Score (Migliore Musica), by the Italian National Syndicate of Film Journalists, in 1968
Apache Fury/El hombre de la diligencia/La furia degli Apache	José María Elorrieta	Spanish/Italian production.	1 October 1964 (Italy)	
Twins from Texas/I gemelli del Texas/Los gemelos de Texas	Steno	Spanish/Italian production. Western comedy, featuring Walter Chiari and Raimondo Vianello.	8 October 1964 (Italy)	
Two Gunmen/I due violenti/Los rurales de Texas	Primo Zeglio	Spanish/Italian production.	8 October 1964 (Italy)	
Lost treasure of the Incas/Sansone e il tesoro degli Incas/Samson und der Schatz der Inkas/Samson et le trésor des Incas	Piero Pierotti	Italian/West German/French production. A Westerner, named Samson (Alan Steel), gets involved with an ancient tribe of Incas hiding in a mountain. This story mixes elements of the Western and the Sword-and-sandal film genre.	15 October 1964 (Italy)	
The road to Fort Alamo/La strada per Fort Alamo/Arizona Bill	Mario Bava	Italian/French production.	24 October 1964 (Italy)	
The last gun/Jim, il primo	Sergio Bergonzelli	Italian production. The gang of Jess Lindall (Livio Lorenzon) terrorizes a Western town while they plan an attack on a transport of gold. Former gunfighter Jim Hart (Cameron Mitchell), who lives incognito as a peaceful shopkeeper, repeatedly interferes with their plans. He gets some help from the gang member, Guitar (Carl Möhner), who turns out to be his brother.	29 October 1964 (Italy)	
The Seven from Texas/Antes llega la muerte/I sette del Texas	Joaquìn Luis Romero Marchent	Spanish/Italian production.	6 November 1964 (Italy)	
Minnesota Clay/L'homme du Minnesota	Sergio Corbucci	Italian/Spanish/French production. Minnesota Clay (Cameron Mitchell), a gunfighter slowly losing his eyesight and serving a long sentence for a crime he didn't commit, escapes from prison. He returns to his hometown to find his daughter (Diana Martin), but gets involved in the fight between a Mexican bandit (Fernando Sancho) and the sheriff (George Riviere), who blackmails the citizens and also withheld information which could have proven Clay innocent.	12 November 1964 (Italy)	
Buffalo Bill, hero of the Far West/Buffalo Bill, l'eroe del Far West/Buffalo Bill, le héros du Far West/Das war Buffalo Bill	Mario Costa	Italian/French/West German production. With Gordon Scott as Buffalo Bill	19 November 1964 (Italy)	
Gunmen of Rio Grande/Sfida a Rio Bravo/Desafío en Rio Bravo/Duel à Rio Bravo	Tulio Demicheli	Italian/Spanish/French production. With Guy Madison as Wyatt Earp	19 November 1964 (Italy)	
Damned pistols of Dallas/Le maledette pistole di Dallas/Las malditas pistolas de Dallas/Les pistolets maudites de Dallas	José Maria Zabalza	Italian/Spanish/French production.	5 December 1964 (Italy)	
Three Dollars of Lead/Tre dollari di piombo/Tres dólares de plomo/Trois dollars de plomb	Pino Mercanti	Italian/Spanish/French production.	19 December 1964 (Italy)	
Magnificent brutes of the West/I magnifici Brutos del West/Los brutos en el Oeste/Les terreurs de l'Ouest	Marino Girolami	Italian/Spanish/French production.	23 December 1964 (Italy)	
Bullet in the Flesh/Il piombo e la carne/El sendero del odio/Les sentiers de la haine	Marino Girolami	Italian/Spanish/French production.	30 December 1964 (Italy)	
Okay, sceriffo	Angio Zane	Italian production.	30 December 1964 (Italy)	
Five Thousand Dollars on One Ace/Los Pistoleros de Arizona/5.000 dollari sull'asso/Die Gejagten der Sierra Nevada	Alfonso Balcázar	Spanish/Italian/West German production. The gambler Jeff Clayton (Robert Woods) wins a deed to one half of a ranch, also belonging to Helen (Maria Sebaldt) and her brother. With some help from outlaw Carrancho (Fernando Sancho), he fights off a crooked lawyer and a gunman.	31 December 1964 (Italy)	
1965
Heroes of Fort Worth/Gli eroi di Fort Worth/El séptimo de caballeria	Alberto De Martino	Italian/Spanish production.	11 January 1965 (Italy)	
Seven Hours of Gunfire/Aventuras del Oeste/Sette ore di fuoco/Die letzte Kugel traf den Besten	Joaquín Luis Romero Marchent	Italian/Spanish/West German production.	21 January 1965 (Italy)	
Die for a dollar in Tucson/Per un dollaro, a Tuckson si muore/On meurt a Tuckson	Cesare Canevari	Italian/French/Yugoslavian production.	27 February 1965 (Italy)	
Oklahoma John/Il ranch degli spietati/Der Sheriff von Rio Rojo	Jaime Jesús Balcázar/Roberto Bianchi Montero	Italian/Spanish/West German production.	11 March 1965 (Italy)	
For a Fist in the Eye/Per un pugno nell'occhio/Por un puñado de golpes	Michele Lupo	Italian/Spanish production. Italian Western comedy.	14 April 1965 (Italy)	
Jesse James' kid/Solo contro tutti/El hijo de Jesse James	Antonio del Amo	Italian/Spanish production. With Robert Hundar as the son of Jesse James	23 April 1965 (Italy)	
A pistol for Ringo/Una pistola per Ringo/Una pistola para Ringo	Duccio Tessari	Italian/Spanish production. When a Mexican bandit (Fernando Sancho) takes a local rancher and his family hostage after a bank robbery, a gunfighter (Giuliano Gemma) is released from prison to infiltrate the gang, in exchange for his acquittal – and a percentage of the recovered loot.	12 May 1965 (Italy)	
Joe Dexter/Oeste Nevada Joe/La sfida degli implacabili	Ignacio F. Iquino	Spanish/Italian production.	4 June 1965 (Italy)	
Stranger in Sacramento/Uno straniero a Sacramento	Sergio Bergonzelli	Italian production. Mike Jordan (Mickey Hargitay) must find those who killed his father and brothers and stole their cattle. He gets help from local woman Lisa (Florencia Silvero) and Chris (Enrico Bomba), a wanted horse thief.	15 June 1965 (Italy)	
Blood for a Silver Dollar/Un dollaro bucato/Le dollar troué	Giorgio Ferroni	Italian/French production. Gary O'Hara (Giuliano Gemma) joins an outlaw gang, in order to clear his dead brother's name.	8 August 1965 (Italy)	
Two sergeants of General Custer/I due sergenti del generale Custer/Dos rivales en Fuerte Álamo	Giorgio Simonelli	Italian/Spanish production. Comedy Western featuring Franco and Ciccio.	13 August 1965 (Italy)	
Colt is My Law/La Colt è la mia legge/La ley del Colt	Alfonso Brescia	Italian/Spanish production.	20 August 1965 (Italy)	
L'ultimo dei Mohicani	Mateo Cano	Italian/Spanish production.	20 August 1965 (Italy)	
Left-handed Johnny West/Johnny West il mancino/Johnny West/Les frères Dynamite	Gianfranco Parolini	Italian/Spanish/French production.	27 August 1965 (Italy)	
Sheriff Won't Shoot/Lo sceriffo che non spara/El sheriff no dispara	José Luis Monter/Renato Polselli	Italian/Spanish production.	9 September 1965 (Italy)	
Hands of a Gunfighter/Il destino di un pistolero/Ocaso de un pistolero	Rafael Romero Marchent	Italian/Spanish production. A gunfighter on the run abducts the child of a sheriff when his own child is killed. He raises the boy and eventually decides to return him, which leads to his own death.	12 September 1965 (Italy)	
West and Soda	Bruno Bozzetto	Italian production. Animation production.	1 October 1965 (Italy)	
Colorado Charlie	Roberto Mauri	Italian production.	2 October 1965 (Italy)	
Man from Canyon City/l'uomo che viene da Canyon City/Que viva Carrancho	Alfonso Balcázar	Spanish/Italian production. Escaped convicts Carrancho (Fernando Sancho) and Red (Luis Dávila) find themselves helping enslaved Mexicans rebel against mine boss Morgan (Robert Woods).	15 October 1965 (Italy)	
I tre del Colorado	Amando de Ossorio	Italian/Spanish production.	12 November 1965 (Italy)	
100.000 dollari per Ringo/Centomilla dollari per Ringo/Sangre sobre Texas	Alberto De Martino	Italian/Spanish production.	18 November 1965 (Italy)	
Man with the Golden Pistol/L'uomo dalla pistola d'oro/Doc, manos de plata	Alfonso Balcázar	Italian/Spanish production. The mayor of Valdosa orders the bandir Reyes (Fernando Sancho) to kill the new sheriff, before he arrives. However, wanted gambler Doc (Carl Möhner) finds the body and assumes the sheriff's identity. Then, a bounty hunter (Luis Dávila) on Doc's trail turns up.	3 December 1965 (Italy)	
The Relentless Four/I quattro inesorabili	Primo Zeglio	Italian /Spanish production. Texas Ranger Adam West takes on four bounty hunters.	3 December 1965 (Italy)	
Why go on killing?/Perché uccidi ancora?/¿Por qué seguir matando?	José Antonio de la Loma	Italian/Spanish production.	4 December 1965 (Italy)	
The return of Ringo/Il ritorno di Ringo/El retorno de Ringo	Duccio Tessari	Italian/Spanish production. On his return from the Civil War, Montgomery Brown (Giuliano Gemma) finds that the Fuentes gang of Mexicans has taken over the town and the gold mines. They have killed his father and their leader, Paco (George Martin), is living in his house with his wife (Lorella De Luca). He enters town, disguised as a Mexican, and starts working for the undertaker (Pajarito). His plan of vengeance is complicated when he discovers that he has a daughter. It may be inspired by the last song of Homer's Odyssey.	8 December 1965 (Italy)	
In a Colt's Shadow/All'ombra di una colt/Plazo para morir	Giovanni Grimaldi	Italian/Spanish production. Steve Blain (Stephen Forsyth) confronts some local bosses, who bring in Duke (Conrado San Martín), who is his former gunplay teacher.	10 December 1965 (Italy)	
Viva Maria!	Louis Malle	Italian/French production. Long lost sisters Maria I (Brigitte Bardot) and Maria II (Jeanne Moreau) reunite during the Mexican Revolution and become involved in gathering intelligence for revolutionaries, under the guise of circus and vaudevillian performers.	18 December 1965 (France)	
For a Few Dollars More/Per qualche dollaro in più/La muerte tenía un precio/Für ein Paar Dollar mehr	Sergio Leone	Italian/Spanish/West German production. The Man With No Name (Clint Eastwood) and older bounty hunter Colonel Mortimer (Lee Van Cleef) reluctantly join forces against Mexican bandit Indio (Gian Maria Volonté) and his gang.	18 December 1965 (Italy)	
Adiós gringo	Giorgio Stegani	Italian/Spanish/French production. Brent Landers (Giuliano Gemma) has to prove his innocence from charges of cattle rustling and murder. He also helps rape victim Lucy (Ida Galli).	22 December 1965 (Italy)	
A Coffin for the Sheriff/Una bara per lo sceriffo/Una tumba para el sheriff	Mario Caiano	Italian/Spanish production.	23 December 1965 (Italy)	
Gold Train/30 Winchester per El Diablo	Gianfranco Baldanello	Italian production.	23 December 1965 (Italy)	
The Tramplers/Gli uomini dal passo pesante/Les Forcenés	Albert Band	Italian/French production. Lon Cordeen (Gordon Scott), a former Confederate soldier, returns home after the American Civil War and tries to help his family, particularly his father, Temple Cordeen (Joseph Cotten), and his younger brother, Hoby (James Mitchum), as they try to rebuild their lives.	31 December 1965 (Italy)	
1966
Ringo's big night/La grande notte di Ringo/Trampa para un forajido	Mario Maffei	Italian/Spanish production. Famous gunfighter Jack Ballman (William Berger) is arrested, for committing several hold-ups. Acting on information from a cellmate, he busts out and, during one night, manages to find the real culprits, hide the loot and return to his cell, where a surprise awaits him.	21 January 1966 (Italy)	
Mutiny at Fort Sharpe/Per un dollaro di gloria/El escuadrón de la muerte	Fernando Cerchio	Italian/Spanish production.	29 January 1966 (Italy)	
Seven guns for the MacGregors/7 pistole per i MacGregor/7 pistolas para los McGregor	Franco Giraldi	Italian/Spanish production.	2 February 1966 (Italy)	
Degueyo/Deguejo	Giuseppe Vari	Italian production.	4 February 1966 (Italy)	
Four Dollars for Vengeance/Cuatro dólares de venganza/4 dollari di vendetta	Alfonso Balcázar/Jaime Jesús Balcázar	Spanish/Italian production.	5 March 1966 (Italy)	
Dollar of Fire/Un dollaro di fuoco/Un dólar de fuego	Nick Nostro	Italian/Spanish production.	10 March 1966 (Italy)	
Dollars for a Fast Gun/100.000 dollari per Lassiter/La muerte cumple condena	Joaquín Luis Romero Marchent	Italian/Spanish production.	10 March 1966 (Italy)	
Seven Dollars on the Red/Sette dollari sul rosso/Siete dòlares al rojo	Alberto Cardone	Italian/Spanish production. Bandit Sancho (Fernando Sancho) kills the wife of Johnny Ashley (Anthony Steffen) and abducts Johnny's son, Jerry (Roberto Miali), to raise him as his own. Johnny's search for his son and his wife's killer ends in tragedy.	16 March 1966 (Italy)	
Three bullets for Ringo/3 colpi di Winchester per Ringo	Emimmo Salvi	Italian production.	16 March 1966 (Italy)	
For One Thousand Dollars Per Day/Per mille dollari al giorno/Por mil dólares al día	Silvio Amadio	Italian/Spanish production. A gunfighter (Mimmo Palmara) is hired to protect a powerful family, who's been receiving anonymous threats. It turns out that he is an avenger and the threats are part of his plan.	17 March 1966 (Italy)	
A gunman called Nebraska/Ringo del Nebraska/Ringo de Nebraska	Antonio Román/Mario Bava	Italian/Spanish production. Nebraska Jim (Ken Clark) gets involved in what turns out to be a fight over hidden loot.	18 March 1966 (Italy)	
Ruthless Colt of the gringo/La spietata Colt del Gringo/la venganza de Clark Harrisson	José Luis Madrid	Italian/Spanish production.	25 March 1966 (Italy)	
Django	Sergio Corbucci	Italian/Spanish production. Django (Franco Nero) arrives in a border town, dragging a coffin behind him. He becomes involved in a feud between a white supremacist troop of ex-Confederates, led by Jackson (Eduardo Fajardo), and a gang of Mexican ex-revolutionaries, led by Hugo (José Bódalo).	6 April 1966 (Italy)	
Seven Magnificent Guns/Le sette magnifiche pistole/Siete pistolas para Timothy	Romolo Guerrieri	Italian/Spanish production.	8 April 1966 (Italy)	
Kill Johnny Ringo/Uccidete Johnny Ringo	Gianfranco Baldanello	Italian production. Texas Ranger Johnny Ringo's (Brett Halsey) mission to stop a counterfeiting ring also involves him in a love drama.	6 May 1966 (Italy)	
Lanky Fellow/Per il gusto di uccidere/Cazador de recompensas	Tonino Valerii	Italian/Spanish production. Bounty hunter Lanky Fellow (Craig Hill) is hired, to protect a shipment of gold from bandit Kennebeck (George Martin).	8 June 1966 (Italy)	
Johnny Oro	Sergio Corbucci	Italian production. Bounty killer Johnny Oro (Mark Damon) reluctantly helps a local sheriff (Ettore Manni) defend his town against an alliance of Mexican bandits and Indians. Based on a story by Adriano Bolzoni and Franco Rossetti.	15 July 1966 (Italy)	
Five dollars for Ringo/5 dollari per Ringo/Cinco pistolas de Texas	Ignacio F. Iquino/Juan Xiol	Italian/Spanish production.	23 July 1966 (Italy)	
Seven pistols for a Gringo/Sette pistole per el gringo/Rio Maldito	Juan Xiol	Italian/Spanish production.	6 August 1966 (Italy)	
Tempo di massacro/Le colt cantarono la morte e fu... tempo di massacro	Lucio Fulci	AKA Massacre Time. Italian production. Tom Corbett (Franco Nero) is called home by a mysterious message and finds his home taken over by big landowner Scott (Giuseppe Addobbati) and his psychotic son, Junior (Nino Castelnuovo). However, Tom's drunken brother, Jeff (George Hilton), is anxious for him to leave immediately.	10 August 1966 (Italy)	
Johnny Yuma	Romolo Guerrieri	Italian production. Samantha Felton (Rosalba Neri) and her brother (Luigi Vannucchi) kill her wealthy husband and plot the death of his nephew and heir to his fortune, gunfighter Johnny Yuma (Mark Damon).	11 August 1966 (Italy)	
For a Few Dollars Less/Per qualche dollaro in meno	Mario Mattoli	Italian production. Western comedy. A spoof of Sergio Leone's For a Few Dollars More.	11 August 1966 (Italy)	
Go with God, gringo/Vajas con Dios, Gringo	Edoardo Mulargia	Italian production.	12 August 1966 (Italy)	
Dynamite Jim/Dinamite Jim/Dinamita Jim	Alfonso Balcázar	Italian/Spanish production. A gambler (Luis Dávila) becomes involved in contention over a shipment of gold, during the Civil War.	12 August 1966 (Italy)	
Ringo and Gringo against all/Ringo e Gringo contro tutti/Ringo y Gringo contra todos	Bruno Corbucci	Italian/Spanish production. Western comedy, featuring Lando Buzzanca and Raimondo Vianello.	15 August 1966 (Italy)	
Djurado/Jim Golden Poker	Giovanni Narzisi	Italian/Spanish production.	20 August 1966 (Italy)	
Starblack/Django – schwarzer Gott des Todes	Giovanni Grimaldi	Italian/West German production.	25 August 1966 (Italy)	
Yankee/El yankee	Tinto Brass	Italian/Spanish production.	25 August 1966 (Italy)	
Los cuatro salvajes	Mario Caiano	Italian/Spanish production.	26 August 1966 (Italy)	
Arizona Colt/Il pistolero di Arizona	Michele Lupo	Italian/French production. Jane's (Corinne Marchand) sister is murdered by a man from the gang of Gordo Watch (Fernando Sancho). Jane hires bounty hunter Arizona Colt (Giuliano Gemma), to get the killer. Since she cannot afford the fee demanded by Arizona, she agrees to spend a night with him.	27 August 1966 (Italy)	
Texas, Adios/Texas, addio	Ferdinando Baldi	Italian/Spanish production. Sheriff Burt Sullivan (Franco Nero) and his brother, Jim (Alberto Dell'Acqua), find some surprises when they go to Mexico, to bring back Cisco Delgado (José Suárez), the man who killed their father.	28 August 1966 (Italy)	
El Rojo/Texas el Rojo	Leopoldo Savona	Italian/Spanish production. Donald Sorenson (Richard Harrison), one by one, kills the respectable citizens responsible for the murder of his parents and brother.	1 September 1966 (Italy)	
Few Dollars for Django/Pochi dollari per Django/Alambradas de violencia	León Klimovsky	Italian/Spanish production. Bounty killer Regan (Anthony Steffen) is sent to investigate whether the supposedly dead bank robber Jim Norton (Frank Wolff) is, in fact, living in Montana, posing as his twin brother. Regan takes on the identity of a new sheriff that has been killed before arrival. Both men get involved in a struggle between farmers and cattle breeders.	9 September 1966 (Italy)	
Hills Run Red/Un fiume di dollari	Carlo Lizzani	Italian production. Ex-convict Jerry Brewster (Thomas Hunter) seeks revenge upon his former partner, Segal (Nando Gazzolo), and gets help from a stranger (Dan Duryea).	9 September 1966 (Italy)	
Seven Vengeful Women/7 donne per una strage/Las siete magníficas/Frauen, die durch die Hölle gehen	Rudolf Zehetgruber, Sidney W. Pink	Italian/Spanish/Austrian/Lichtenstein production.	26 September 1966 (Italy)	
For a Few Extra Dollars/Per pochi dollari ancora/El hombre del Sur/Trois cavaliers pour fort Yuma	Giorgio Ferroni	Italian/Spanish/French production. Ex-Confederate soldier Gary Hammond (Giuliano Gemma) accepts a mission to stop his former comrades-in-arms from a suicide attack, by disclosing the treason of their commander (Jacques Sernas).	7 October 1966 (Italy)	
Five for Revenge/I cinque della vendetta/Los cinco de la venganza	Aldo Florio	Italian/Spanish production. A rancher is murdered and five of his friends, led by Tex (Guy Madison), help his widow get revenge on the killers, who are her cousins!	12 October 1966 (Italy)	
Sugar Colt	Franco Giraldi	Italian/Spanish production. Rocco (Hunt Powers) – also called the man with two faces – goes to Snake Valley disguised as a doctor, in order to investigate the disappearance of some soldiers.	12 October 1966 (Italy)	
El Cisco	Sergio Bergonzelli	Italian production. Cisco (William Berger) is framed for a bank robbery. He escapes from his own hanging and goes to clear his name and find the real culprits, who turn out to be town boss Big Burt (Tom Felleghy) and the bandit Cascaron (George Wang).	13 October 1966 (Italy)	
Thompson 1880	Guido Zurli	Italian/Spanish production.	13 October 1966 (Italy)	
Django shoots first/Django spara per primo	Alberto De Martino	Italian production. Glenn (Glenn Saxson) kills a bounty hunter who has killed his father and then, takes his father's body into town to collect the bounty. When he also claims his inheritance, he finds adversaries, as well as assistants.	28 October 1966 (Italy)	
Kill or Die/Uccidi o muori	Tanio Boccia	Italian production. Rancher Lisa Drummond (Elina De Witt) is threatened by a local boss and his mean sons. Fortunately (for her), her new farm hand turns out to be a notorious gunfighter (Robert Mark), hiding from his reputation under another name.	1 November 1966 (Italy)	
The Ugly Ones/The bounty killer/El precio de un hombre	Eugenio Martín	Italian/Spanish production. Jose Gomez (Tomas Milian), a recently escaped outlaw, is tracked to his hometown by bounty hunter Luke Chilson (Richard Wyler). Unaware that Gomez has become a hardened criminal, Eden (Ilya Karin) and the other townspeople attempt to hide him from his pursuer.	4 November 1966 (Italy)	Awards: 2nd place at the National Syndicate of Spectacle, in 1966
Ramon the Mexican/Ramon il Messicano	Maurizio Pradeaux	Italian production.	13 November 1966 (Italy)	
Navajo Joe/Un dollaro a testa/Joe, el implacable	Sergio Corbucci	Italian/Spanish production. After his tribe is massacred, a lone surviving Navajo (Burt Reynolds) pursues the outlaw gang responsible.	25 November 1966 (Italy)	
The Big Gundown/La resa dei conti/El halcón y la presa	Sergio Sollima	Italian/Spanish production. Jonathan Corbett (Lee Van Cleef), lawman and bounty hunter, chases Mexican bandit Cuchillo Sanchez (Tomas Milian) across the Mexican border, where some surprises await Corbett.	29 November 1966 (Spain), 3 March 1967 (Italy)	
Two sons of Ringo/I due figli di Ringo	Giorgio Simonelli/Giuliano Carnimeo	Italian production. Comedy Western, featuring Franco and Ciccio.	7 December 1966 (Italy)	
A Bullet for the General/Quién Sabe?	Damiano Damiani	Italian production. A mercenary (Lou Castel) is hired to infiltrate a group of Mexican revolutionaries and befriends one of the rebels, El Chucho (Gian Maria Volonté).	7 December 1966 (Italy)	
One Thousand Dollars on the Black/Mille dollari sul nero/Sartana	Alberto Cardone	Italian/West German production. Johnny Liston (Anthony Steffen) returns home, after serving a prison sentence for a murder he didn't commit. His mother (Carla Calò), at first, rejects him and favors his brother, Sartana (Gianni Garko), whose gang terrorizes the town.	18 December 1966 (Italy)	
My name is Pecos/Due once di piombo	Maurizio Lucidi	Italian production.	22 December 1966 (Italy)	
Sheriff With the Gold/Uno sceriffo tutto d'oro	Osvaldo Civirani	Italian production.	22 December 1966 (Italy)	
The Good, the Bad and the Ugly/Il buono, il brutto, il cattivo	Sergio Leone	Italian/Spanish/West German/U.S. Production. In the final installment of the Dollars trilogy, which takes place during the Civil War, the Man With No Name, here called "Blondie" (Clint Eastwood), becomes involved with bandit Tuco (Eli Wallach) and hired killer Angel Eyes (Lee Van Cleef) in a search for a stolen US Army gold shipment. The film features a brilliant climax with "the Trio". Of all the Spaghetti Western films, this one consistently receives the highest ratings.	23 December 1966 (Italy)	Awards: 2nd place for Best Action Performance (Clint Eastwood), at the 1968 Laurel Awards.
Two thousand dollars for Coyote/Ballad of a Bount Hunter/Django cacciatore di taglie/Dos mil dólares por Coyote	León Klimovsky	Spanish/Italian production.	1966 (Spain & Italy)	
1967
A Stranger in Town/Un dollaro tra i denti	Luigi Vanzi	U.S./Italian production. A gunfighter, known only as "The Stranger" (Tony Anthony), seeks revenge against the local crime boss, who double-crossed him in a deal.	13 January 1967 (Italy)	
Django, kill... If you live, shoot!/Se sei vivo spara/Oro maldito	Giulio Questi	Italian/Spanish production. The Mexican gang of the halfbreed hero (Tomas Milian) and the Anglo gang of Oaks (Piero Lulli) hijack a gold transport. The Mexicans are then gunned down, but two Indians help the hero to recover. He catches up and out-guns Oaks in a town where the citizens already have lynched Oak's men. The gold now becomes an object of contention between the hero, "substantial citizens" Templar (Milo Quesada), Alderman (Paco Sanz) and rancher Zorro (Roberto Camardiel).	22 January 1967 (Italy)	
The Hellbenders/I crudeli/Los despiadados	Sergio Corbucci	Italian/Spanish production. An ex-Confederate officer (Joseph Cotten) and his sons rob a gold transport, in order to revive the Confederacy. They try to smuggle the loot through Union territory in a coffin and blackmail a gambler (Norma Bengell) to act as the widow.	2 February 1967 (Italy)	
Clint the Stranger/Clint il solitario/Una tumba para Johnny Ringo/Tal der Hoffnung	Alfonso Balcázar	Italian/Spanish/West German production.	2 February 1967 (Italy)	
Dynamite Joe/Joe l'implacabile/Dinamita Joe	Antonio Margheriti	Italian/Spanish production.	15 February 1967 (Italy)	
Long Days of Vengeance/I lunghi giorni della vendetta/Los largos días de la venganza/Les long jours de la vengeance	Florestano Vancini	Italian/Spanish/French production. Ted Barnett (Giuliano Gemma) escapes from prison to prove his innocence, which entails a careful game of cunning.	23 February 1967 (Italy)	
Fury of Johnny Kid/Dove si spara di più/La furia de Johnny Kid	Gianni Puccini	Italian/Spanish production. Johnny (Peter Lee Lawrence) and Giulietta (Cristina Galbó) fall in love, despite the fact that their families are deadly enemies. In the end, the couple leave together, while their families kill each other in a big showdown. An unknown man in a mask of death completes the massacre. Based on William Shakespeare's play Romeo and Juliet.	2 March 1967 (Italy)	
Up the MacGregors!/7 donne per i MacGregor/7 mujeres para los Mac Gregors	Franco Giraldi	Italian/Spanish production.	3 March 1967 (Italy)	Sequel to Seven guns for the MacGregors
10,000 Dollars Blood Money/10.000 dollari per un massacro	Romolo Guerrieri	Italian production. Bounty Hunter Django (Gianni Garko) refuses to go after kidnapper Manuel Vasquez (Claudio Camaso), because the bounty offered is too low. Eventually, he joins Vasquez in a stagecoach robbery, with tragic consequences.	3 March 1967 (Italy)	
The man who killed Billy the Kid/...e divenne il più spietato bandito del Sud/¡El hombre que mató a Billy el Niño!	Julio Buchs	Italian/Spanish production. With Peter Lee Lawrence as Billy the Kid and Fausto Tozzi as Pat Garrett	9 March 1967 (Italy)	
Requiescant	Carlo Lizzani	Italian/West German production. After surviving his family's massacre, a young boy (Lou Castel) is taken in and raised by a preacher. Years later, he comes face-to-face with the man that killed his family.	10 March 1967 (Italy)	
Wanted	Giorgio Ferroni	Italian production. Sheriff Gary Ryan (Giuliano Gemma) is unjustly accused of murder and must clear his name, while being hunted as an outlaw.	22 March 1967 (Italy)	
Cold killer/Uccideva a freddo	Guido Celano	Italian production.	23 March 1967 (Italy)	
Kitosch, the man who came from the North/Frontera al Sur/Kitosch, l'uomo che veniva dal Nord	José Luis Merino	Spanish/Italian production.	23 March 1967 (Italy)	
Pecos cleans up/Pecos è qui: prega e muori	Maurizio Lucidi	Italian production.	23 March 1967 (Italy)	Sequel to My name is Pecos.
Two crosses at Danger Pass/Due croci a Danger Pass/Dos cruces a Danger Pass	Rafael Romero Marchent	Italian/Spanish production	28 March 1967 (Italy)	
Renegade Riders/Sette winchester per un massacro	Enzo G. Castellari	Italian production. Two bounty hunters (Edd Byrnes and Luisa Baratto) infiltrate a gang of Confederate renegades, looking for a hidden war chest.	14 April 1967 (Italy)	
Man and a Colt/Un uomo e una Colt/Un hombre y un Colt	Tulio Demicheli	Spanish/Italian production	14 April 1967 (Italy)	
Ballad of a Gunman/Ballata per un pistolero/Rocco – der Einzelgänger von Alamo	Alfio Caltabiano	Italian/West German production.	19 April 1967 (Italy)	
Killer Caliber .32/Killer Calibro .32	Alfonso Brescia	Italian production.	20 April 1967 (Italy)	
Wanted: Johnny Texas	Emimmo Salvi	Italian production.	27 April 1967 (Italy)	
Django kills softly/Bill il taciturno/Django, le taciturne	Massimo Pupillo	Italian/French production.	29 April 1967 (Italy)	
Adios, Hombre	Mario Caiano	Italian/Spanish production.	29 April 1967 (Italy)	
Son of Django/Il figlio di Django	Osvaldo Civirani	Italian production.	26 May 1967 (Italy)	
Born to Kill/Nato per uccidere	Antonio Mollica	Italian production.	15 June 1967 (Italy)	
Poker with Pistols/Un poker di pistole	Giuseppe Vari	Italian production. After losing his money at cards, Lucas (George Eastman) gets entangled in some schemes concerning counterfeit money.	7 July 1967 (Italy)	
Death at Owell Rock/La morte non conta i dollari	Riccardo Freda	Italian production. Lawrence White (Stephen Forsyth) returns to his hometown and reopens the investigation into the murder of his father. Doc Lester (Nello Pazzafini), the one behind the murder, hires Boyd (Mark Damon) to stop White – with unexpected consequences.	21 July 1967 (Italy)	
Magnificent Texan/Il magnifico Texano/Diez horcas para un pistolero	Luigi Capuano	Italian/Spanish production.	28 July 1967 (Italy)	
Last of the badmen/Il tempo degli avvoltoi	Nando Cicero	Italian production. Kitosch (George Hilton) is branded by his ranch boss (Eduardo Fajardo), after becoming too close with the latter's wife (Pamela Tudor). Kitosch escapes and joins up with gunfighter Tracy (Frank Wolff), but is eventually repelled by Tracy's violent methods.	2 August 1967 (Italy)	
Cjamango	Edoardo Mulargia	Italian production. Cjamango (Sean Todd) has been robbed of a poker pot of gold and exploits the conflict between Don Pablo (Livio Lorenzon) and Tiger (Piero Lulli), in order to regain it. He gets some help from Clinton (Mickey Hargitay), who claims to be a whisky salesman.	9 August 1967 (Italy)	
Day of Violence	Alfonso Brescia	Italian production. In the aftermath of the Civil War, Johs (Peter Lee Lawrence) seeks vengeance on Clifford (Luigi Vannucchi), who has killed his brother.	10 August 1967 (Italy)	
The Last Killer/L'ultimo killer	Giuseppe Vari	Italian production.	10 August 1967 (Italy)	
Rita of the West/Little Rita nel West	Ferdinando Baldi	Italian production. Protector of the West, Little Rita (Rita Pavone), loves Black Star (Terence Hill), who is only out for gold. Several musical numbers included.	11 August 1967 (Italy)	
The Handsome, the Ugly and the Stupid/Il bello, il brutto, il cretino	Giovanni Grimaldi	Italian/West German production. Comedy Western, featuring Franco and Ciccio.	13 August 1967 (Italy)	
Gentleman Killer/Gentleman Jo... uccidi/Gentleman Jo	Giorgio Stegani	Italian/Spanish production.	14 August 1967 (Italy)	
God does not pay on Saturday/Dio non paga il sabato/Il prezo del oro	Tanio Boccia	Italian/Spanish production.	15 August 1967 (Italy)	
Death walks in Laredo/Tre pistole contro Cesare	Enzo Peri	Italian production. A former sheriff (Thomas Hunter), a martial arts expert (James Shigeta) and a magician (Nadir Moretti) seek the inheritance of their common father. In the process, they must fight a local boss, who imitates the lifestyle of Julius Caesar (Enrico Maria Salerno).	16 August 1967 (Italy)	
The Stranger Returns/Un uomo, un cavallo, una pistola/Western Jack	Luigi Vanzi	Italian/West German/U.S. production. The mysterious gunfighter (Tony Anthony) and a local preacher (Marco Guglielmi) track down an outlaw gang that has robbed a stagecoach made of solid gold.	17 August 1967 (Italy)	
Rick and John, conquerors of the West/Ric e Gian alla conquista del West	Osvaldo Civirani	Italian production.	18 August 1967 (Italy)	
Hate for Hate/Odio per odio	Domenico Paolella	Italian production. Miguel Mendez (Antonio Sabàto), who mines gold used by Coyote (Fernando Sancho) to buy peons free from their padrones, so they can go back to Mexico, gets involved with bank robber Jeff (John Ireland).	19 August 1967 (Italy)	
Two R-R-Ringos from Texas/Due Rrringos nel Texas	Marino Girolami	Italian production. Comedy Western featuring Franco and Ciccio.	25 August 1967 (Italy)	
Death Rides a Horse/Da uomo a uomo	Giulio Petroni	Italian production. Bill Meceita (John Phillip Law) tries to team up with an ex-outlaw (Lee Van Cleef) to go after the outlaws who murdered his family when he was a child.	31 August 1967 (Italy)	
Rattler Kid/L'uomo venuto per uccidere/Un hombre vino a matar	León Klimovsky	Italian/Spanish production.	11 September 1967 (Italy)	
Any Gun Can Play/Vado... l'ammazzo e torno	Enzo G. Castellari	Italian production. A bank employee (Edd Byrnes), a Mexican bandit (Gilbert Roland), a bounty hunter (George Hilton) and several other parties double-cross each other over a stolen shipment of gold.	26 September 1967 (Italy)	
Killer Kid	Leopoldo Savona	Italian production. Posing as an outlaw, a US Army officer (Anthony Steffen) is sent to stop gun-running across the border. He gets involved with Mexican revolutionaries, especially Mercedes (Liz Barret).	30 September 1967 (Italy)	
The Dirty Outlaws/El desperado	Franco Rossetti	Italian production. The outlaw Steve (Andrea Giordana) takes the uniform of a dead officer and pretends to be the returning son of a blind man. He helps an outlaw gang capture a money transport from the army and escapes with the loot, but is caught, beaten and left for dead. The bandits kill his "father" and rape his love interest (Rosemary Dexter). He avenges their deeds with the help of a con-man (Aldo Berti)	30 September 1967 (Italy)	
Bandidos/Crepa tu... che vivo io	Massimo Dallamano	Italian/Spanish production. During a train robbery, master gunfighter Richard Martin (Enrico Maria Salerno) has his hands destroyed in a gunfight with his former pupil, Bill Cane (Venantino Venantini). To avenge himself on Cane, Martin trains a stranger, called Ricky Shot (Terry Jenkins), but the latter has his own agenda.	15 October 1967 (Italy)	
If One Is Born a Swine/Voltati... ti uccido/Winchester Bill	Alfonso Brescia	Italian/Spanish production.	21 October 1967 (Italy)	
Lola Colt	Siro Marcellini	Italian production, featuring Lola Falana.	22 October 1967 (Italy)	
Halleluja for Django/La più grande rapina del West	Maurizio Lucidi	Italian production. The gang of Jarrett (Walter Barnes) robs a bank and then, takes control of the small town of Poorlands, where they kill the sheriff. Jarrett's plans are secretly obstructed on the one hand by El Santo (Jack Betts), one of his own men, and on the other by Billy "Rhum" (George Hilton), the sheriff's brother, who seems to be locked up in the town jail.	28 October 1967 (Italy)	
Buckaroo: The Winchester does not forgive/Buckaroo	Adelchi Bianchi	Italian production.	28 October 1967 (Italy)	
God forgives... I don't!/Dio perdona... io no!/Tú perdonas... yo no	Giuseppe Colizzi	Italian/Spanish production. Cat (Terence Hill) is looking for Bill San Antonio (Frank Wolff), who has disappeared with the loot from a train robbery, and is joined by the insurance agent, Hutch (Bud Spencer).	31 October 1967 (Italy)	The film is the first in a trilogy, continued with Ace High and Boot Hill
Death Rides Along/Con lui cavalca la morte	Giuseppe Vari	Italian production.	11 November 1967 (Italy)	
John the Bastard/Johnny il bastardo	Armando Crispino	Italian production. Based on the story of Don Juan.	16 November 1967 (Italy)	
Bang Bang Kid	Luciano Lelli	Italian/Spanish production.	19 November 1967 (Italy)	
Face to Face/Faccia a faccia/Cara a cara	Sergio Sollima	Italian/Spanish production. Brad Fletcher (Gian Maria Volonté), a history professor, joins a bandit gang, led by Solomon Beauregard Bennett (Tomas Milian).	23 November 1967 (Italy)	
Devil Was an Angel/Una Colt in pugno del diavolo	Sergio Bergonzelli	Italian production.	24 November 1967 (Italy)	
Vengeance Is Mine/Per 100.000 dollari ti ammazzo	Giovanni Fago	Italian production. Bounty hunter Johnny Forest (Gianni Garko) arrests his half-brother, Clint (Claudio Camaso), who earlier had shot their father and blamed Johnny for it. As the Confederate administration is falling apart, the bounty cannot be paid. Instead, Johnny joins Clint to search for a hidden treasure of gold, with tragic consequences.	30 November 1967 (Italy)	
Don't wait, Django... shoot!/Non aspettare Django, spara!	Edoardo Mulargia	Italian production.	2 December 1967 (Italy)	
Red Blood, Yellow Gold/Professionisti per un massacro/Los profesionales de la muerte	Nando Cicero	Italian/Spanish production. Several parties fight and betray each other over a stolen transport of gold.	7 December 1967 (Italy)	
Fifteen Scaffolds for the Killer/15 forche per un assassino/Quince horcas para un asesino	Nunzio Malasomma	Italian/Spanish production.	15 December 1967 (Italy)	
Day of Anger/I giorni dell'ira/Der Tod ritt Dienstags	Tonino Valerii	Italian/West German production. A town outcast (Giuliano Gemma) wants to become the apprentice of the gunfighter Frank Talby (Lee Van Cleef).	19 December 1967 (Italy)	
Man, Pride and Vengeance/L'uomo, l'orgoglio, la vendetta/Mit Django kam der Tod	Luigi Bazzoni	Italian/West German production. Based on the novella Carmen, by Prosper Mérimée.	22 December 1967 (Italy)	
Two faces of the Dollar/Le due face del dollaro/Poker d'as pour Django	Roberto Bianchi Montero	Italian/French production.	28 December 1967 (Italy)	
1968
Death Sentence/Sentenza di morte	Mario Lanfranchi	Italian production.	1 January 1968 (Italy)	
Train for Durango/Un treno per Durango/Un tren para Durango	Mario Caiano	Italian/Spanish production. When bandits steal a safe full of gold, its key gets into the hands of small-time thieves Gringo (Anthony Steffen) and Lucas (Enrico Maria Salerno). They form a partnership with Brown (Mark Damon) and Helen (Dominique Boschero), to get their hands on the safe.	6 January 1968 (Italy)	
If you want to live... shoot!/Se vuoi vivere... spara!	Sergio Garrone	Italian production. The gold miner Johnny Dall (Ivan Rassimov) escapes a set-up made by Stack (Giovanni Cianfriglia), who distributes fake wanted posters for him, attracting the attention of bounty killer Donovan (Riccardo Garrone), while Johnny gets involved in a fight between a rancher and a city boss.	7 January 1968 (Italy)	
I'll Sell My Skin Dearly/Vendo cara la pelle	Ettore Maria Fizzarotti	Italian production.	10 January 1968 (Italy)	
Django, prepare a coffin/Viva Django/Preparati la bara!	Ferdinando Baldi	Italian production. The wife of Django (Terence Hill) is killed when the transport of gold he's guarding is attacked by the men of his "friend", David Barry (Horst Frank). He becomes a hangman, who spares the lives of the condemned victims of Barry's conspiracies and organizes them into a band, to help him disclose Barry.	27 January 1968 (Italy)	"Last Man Standing", a piece from the film's score, was sampled (with songwriting credit) in the smash 2006 R&B hit "Crazy", by Gnarls Barkley.
A Minute to Pray, a Second to Die/Un minuto per pregare, un istante per morire	Franco Giraldi	U.S./Italian production. Outlaw Clay McCord (Alex Cord) considers accepting an amnesty from the governor (Robert Ryan), but the amnesty is opposed both by the sheriff (Arthur Kennedy) and by outlaw leader Kraut (Mario Brega).	8 February 1968 (Italy)	
Killer, Adios/Killer, adiós/Winchester, uno entre mil	Primo Zeglio	Italian/Spanish production.	8 February 1968 (Italy)	
The Ruthless Four/Ognuno per sé/Das Gold von Sam Cooper	Giorgio Capitani	Italian/West German production. Sam Cooper's (Van Heflin) partner tries to kill him over their gold strike, but Sam kills him instead. He sends for his former partner Manolo Sanchez (George Hilton), to work the mine. As the latter is joined by the sinister-looking Brent The Blonde (Klaus Kinski), Sam brings in his former friend, later adversary, Mason (Gilbert Roland), for his protection.	9 February 1968 (Italy)	
Ringo, the lone rider/Ringo, il cavaliere solitario/Dos hombres van a morir	Rafael Romero Marchent	Italian/Spanish production.	15 February 1968 (Italy)	
Gunman Sent by God/Il pistolero segnato da Dio	Giorgio Ferroni	Italian production.	29 February 1968 (Italy)	
Gun Shy Piluk/Giurò... e li uccise ad uno ad uno	Guido Celano	Italian production.	7 March 1968 (Italy)	
Saguaro/Sapevano solo uccidere	Tanio Boccia	Italian production.	10 March 1968 (Italy)	
Pray to God and dig your grave/Prega Dio... e scavati la fossa!	Edoardo Mulargia	Italian production.	14 March 1968 (Italy)	
The Belle Starr story/Il mio corpo per un poker	Lina Wertmüller/Piero Cristofani	Italian production. The outlaws Belle Starr (Elsa Martinelli) and Larry Blackie (George Eastman) have a relation of attraction mixed with competition.	15 March 1968 (Italy)	
Johnny Hamlet/Quella sporcha storia nel West	Enzo G. Castellari	Italian production. When Johnny (Andrea Giordana) returns to his home, Ranch Elsenor, he learns that his father is believed to have embezzled $300,000, before he was killed by the bandit Santana (Manuel Sarrano), who, in his turn, was killed by Johnny's uncle, Clyde (Horst Frank). The latter has also married Johnny's mother (Françoise Prévost). Eventually, Johnny finds out that the guilty party is Clyde, who has taken the money and is in cahoots with Santana, who is still alive.	22 March 1968 (Italy)	Based on William Shakespeare's Hamlet.
Vengeance Is My Forgiveness/La vendetta è il mio perdono	Roberto Mauri	Italian production.	23 March 1968 (Italy)	
A stranger in Paso Bravo/Uno straniero a Paso Bravo/Los pistoleros de Paso Bravo	Salvatore Rosso	Italian/Spanish production.	23 March 1968 (Italy)	
All out/Tutto per tutto/La hora del coraje	Umberto Lenzi	Italian/Spanish production.	27 March 1968 (Italy)	
Today We Kill, Tomorrow We Die!/Oggi a me... domani a te	Tonino Cervi	Italian production. On his release from prison, Bill Kiowa (Brett Halsey) gathers a group of gunfighters, to avenge himself on bandit Elfego (Tatsuya Nakadai), who was the one who framed him and, also, killed his wife.	28 March 1968 (Italy)	
Cowards Don't Pray/I vigliacchi non pregano/El vengador del Sur	Mario Siciliano	Italian/Spanish production.	2 April 1968 (Italy)	
Rope For a Bastard/Una forca per un bastardo	Amasai Damiano	Italian production.	3 April 1968 (Italy)	
A Long Ride from Hell/Vivo per la tua morte	Camillo Bazzoni	Italian production.	5 April 1968 (Italy)	
Long Days of Hate/I lunghi giorni dell'odio	Gianfranco Baldanello	Italian production.	5 April 1968 (Italy)	
Tequila Joe/...e venne il tempo di uccidere	Enzo Dell'Aquila	Italian production.	5 April 1968 (Italy)	
Blood Calls to Blood/Sangue chiama sangue	Luigi Capuano	Italian production.	6 April 1968 (Italy)	
Beyond the Law/Al di lá della legge/Die letzte Rechnung zahlst du selbst	Giorgio Stegani	Italian/West German production. Billy Joe Cudlip (Lee Van Cleef) becomes a sheriff, in order to steal a silver shipment, but circumstances make him act his position.	10 April 1968 (Italy)	
Vengeance/Joko – Invoca Dio... e muori/Fünf blutige Stricke	Antonio Margheriti	Italian/West German production.	19 April 1968 (Italy)	
Garter Colt/Giarrettiera Colt	Gian Andrea Rocco	Italian production.	19 April 1968 (Italy)	
God made them... I kill them/Dio li crea... io li ammazzo!	Paolo Bianchini	Italian Production. Elegantly dressed gunfighter Slim Corbett (Dean Reed) is hired by the city fathers, to clear up a bank robbery. He is framed for a murder, but with the help of a local Mexican sidekick, he is able to disclose that the sheriff and a rich landowner are the culprits.	29 April 1968 (Italy)	
Ballad of a Bounty Hunter/Io non perdono... uccido/Fedra West	Joaquín Luis Romero Marchent	Italian/Spanish production. Story based on the Greek myth of Fedra.	5 May 1968 (Italy)	
Stranger, Say Your Prayers/Straniero... fatti il segno della croce!	Demofilo Fidani	Italian production.	16 May 1968 (Italy)	
A Hole in the Forehead/Un buco in fronte	Giuseppe Vari	Italian production.	25 May 1968 (Italy)	
The Silent Stranger/Lo straniero di silenzio	Luigi Vanzi	Italian production. The Stranger (Tony Anthony) finds himself between two warring families in Japan.	23 June 1968 (Italy)	
I want him dead/Lo voglio morto/Lo quiero muerto	Paolo Bianchini	Italian/Spanish production.	15 June 1968 (Italy)	
Man called Amen/O tutto o niente	Guido Zurli	Italian production.	5 July 1968 (Italy)	
Bury Them Deep/All'ultimo sangue	Paolo Moffa	Italian production. Army captain Norton (Craig Hill) helps outlaw El Chaleco (Ettore Manni) to escape from the gallows, in order to enlist his help in finding bank robber Billy Gunn (Giovanni Cianfriglia).	18 July 1968 (Italy)	
Hate Thy Neighbor/Odia il prossimo tuo	Ferdinando Baldi	Italian production.	26 July 1968 (Italy)	
Man who Cried for Revenge/Il suo nome gridava vendetta	Mario Caiano	Italian production. Davy Flanagan (Anthony Steffen) has lost his memory, during the Civil War. When he is accused of crimes committed during the war and finds his wife married to another man, he is offered help by Judge Kellogg (William Berger). But, can Kellogg be trusted?	28 July 1968 (Italy)	
Moment to Kill/Il momento di uccidere/Django – ein Sarg voll Blut	Giuliano Carnimeo	Italian/West German production. Gunfighters Lord (George Hilton) and Bull (Walter Barnes) intervene to help a crippled young woman (Loni von Friedl), who is terrorized by an evil town boss out for a hidden fortune. But, there is more to this than meets the eye!	4 August 1968 (Italy)	
Revenge for Revenge/Vendetta per vendetta	Mario Colucci	Italian production.	10 August 1968 (Italy)	
One Dollar Too Many/Vado, vedo e sparo/Llego, veo, disparo	Enzo G. Castellari	Italian/Spanish production. Gambler Clay (John Saxon), actor Kean (Frank Wolff), petty thief Moses (Antonio Sabàto) and others compete for the loot of a bank robbery.	12 August 1968 (Italy)	
Uno dopo l'altro	Nick Nostro	Italian/Spanish production.	13 August 1968 (Italy)	
May God forgive you... But, I won't/Chiede perdono a Dio, non a me	Vincenzo Musolino	Italian production.	13 August 1968 (Italy)	
If you meet Sartana, pray for your death/...se incontri Sartana, prega per la tua morte/Sartana – Bete um Deinen Tod	Gianfranco Parolini	Italian/West German production. An inordinate number of people are killed as two bankers, a Mexican landowner (Fernando Sancho), a vicious outlaw leader (William Berger) and other parties vie for an elusive shipment of gold. Finally, it falls into the hands of the mysterious Sartana (Gianni Garko).	14 August 1968 (Italy)	
Execution	Domenico Paolella	Italian production.	14 August 1968 (Italy)	
A Sky Full of Stars for a Roof/E per tetto un cielo di stelle	Giulio Petroni	Italian production. Harry (Mario Adorf) is a gullible gold miner, who gets involved with Billy (Giuliano Gemma), a con man and a womaniser. They try several unsuccessful schemes to get rich. Billy turns out to be a famous gunfighter, hunted by the vengeful Pratt (Federico Boido).	14 August 1968 (Italy)	
Three Silver Dollars/...dai nemici mi guardo io!	Mario Amendola	Italian production. Hondo (Julián Mateos) is anxious for a partnership with Gringo (Charles Southwood), who competes with bandit leader El Condor (Mirko Ellis) for three coins, that together disclose the location of a treasure.	16 August 1968 (Italy)	
Dead for a Dollar/T'ammazzo! Raccomandati a Dio/Fidarsi è bene, sparare è meglio	Osvaldo Civirani	Italian production.	17 August 1968 (Italy)	
One More to Hell/Uno di più all'inferno	Giovanni Fago	Italian production.	17 August 1968 (Italy)	
Requiem for a gringo/Requiem per un gringo/Réquiem para el gringo	José Luis Merino	Italian/Spanish production. Ross Logan (Lang Jeffries) sets out to avenge his brother, who was killed by the gang of Carranza (Fernando Sancho). Partly based on Masaki Kobayashi's film 'Harakiri'.	23 August 1968 (Italy)	
One Against One... No Mercy/Ad uno ad uno... spietatamento/Uno an uno, sin piedad	Rafael Romero Marchent	Italian/Spanish production.	24 August 1968 (Italy)	
Pistol for a Hundred Coffins/Una pistola per cento bare/El sabor del odio	Umberto Lenzi	Italian/Spanish production.	24 August 1968 (Italy)	
Wrath of God/L'ira di Dio/Hasta la última gota de sangre	Alberto Cardone	Italian/Spanish production.	24 August 1968 (Italy)	
Run, Man, Run!/...corri uomo corri/Saludos hombre	Sergio Sollima	Italian/French production. Tomas Milian reprises his role as Mexican bandit Cuchillo Sanchez, who competes with various gunfighters, mercenaries, bounty hunters and outlaws to find a fortune in gold, once belonging to Mexican revolutionaries.	29 August 1968 (Italy)	A direct sequel to The Big Gundown
Long Day of the Massacre/Il lungo giorno del massacro	Alberto Cardone	Italian production.	29 August 1968 (Italy)	
Shoot, Gringo... Shoot!/Spara, Gringo, spara	Bruno Corbucci	Italian production.	31 August 1968 (Italy)	
Shoot Twice/Due volte Giuda/Dos veces judas	Nando Cicero	Italian/Spanish production.	31 August 1968 (Spain), 1 September 1969 (Italy)	
A Taste of Death/Cost of Dying/Quanto costa morire/Les colts brillent au soleil	Sergio Merolle	Italian/French production.	14 September 1968 (Italy)	
Find a Place to Die/Joe... cercati un posto per morire!	Giuliano Carnimeo	Italian production. An ex-Confederate soldier, Joe Collins (Jeffrey Hunter), finds redemption when he defends a woman (Pascale Petit) and her gold mine from a gang of outlaws.	21 September 1968 (Italy)	
Ciccio forgives, I don't!/Ciccio perdona... Io no!	Marcello Ciorciolini	Italian production.	26 September 1968 (Italy)	Italian Western comedy. The title is a paraphrase of "God forgives... I don't !"
Between God, the devil and a Winchester/Anche nel west c'era una volta Dio/Entre Dìos y el diablo	Marino Girolami	Italian/Spanish production.	7 October 1968 (Italy)	
Guns for San Sebastian/La Bataille de San Sebastian/I cannoni di San Sebastian/Los cañones de San Sebastián	Henri Verneuil	French/Italian/Mexican production. An outlaw (Anthony Quinn), seeking sanctuary, is brought by a priest to the small village San Sebastian. When the priest is killed, the townspeople mistakenly believe that the outlaw is the priest.	18 October 1968 (Italy)	
Black Jack/Un uomo per cinque vendette	Gianfranco Baldanello	Italian production.	24 October 1968 (Italy)	
Sartana does not forgive/Sartana non perdona/Sonora	Alfonso Balcázar	Italian/Spanish production. Bounty killer Sartana (George Martin) and bank robber José (Alfo Caltabiano) both seek vengeance on Slim Kovacs (Jack Elam), who hires another bounty killer (Gilbert Roland) to protect him.	25 October 1968 (Italy)	
And now... make your peace with God/Ed ora... raccomanda l'anima a Dio!	Demofilo Fidani	Italian production.	26 October 1968 (Italy)	
Ace High/I quattro dell'Ave Maria	Giuseppe Colizzi	Italian/U.S. production. Cacopoulos (Eli Wallach) robs Cat Stevens (Terence Hill) and Hutch Bessy (Bud Spencer). They catch up with him and agree to help him get revenge against his old partners, who betrayed him.	31 October 1968 (Italy)	This is a direct sequel to "God forgives... I don't! ".
The Great Silence/Il grande silenzio/Le grand silence	Sergio Corbucci	Italian/French production. A mute gunfighter (Jean-Louis Trintignant) faces a group of outlaws, pursued by bounty killers, while stranded in the Great Blizzard of 1899.	19 November 1968 (Italy)	
If One Is Born a Swine... Kill Him/Carogne si nasce	Alfonso Brescia	Italian production.	21 November 1968 (Italy)	
No graves on Boot Hill/Tre croci per non morire	Sergio Garrone	Italian production.	23 November 1968 (Italy)	
Cry for revenge/I morte non si contano/Quién grita venganza?	Rafael Romero Marchent	Italian/Spanish production. As bounty hunting partners Fred (Anthony Steffen) and Johnny (Mark Damon) try to make a living, they disturb the machinations of the local boss.	11 December 1968 (Italy)	
Gatling Gun/Quel caldo maledetto giorno di fuoco/La ametralladora	Paolo Bianchini	Italian/Spanish production.	13 December 1968 (Italy)	
The Mercenary/Il mercenario/Salario para matar	Sergio Corbucci	Italian/Spanish production. A Polish mercenary (Franco Nero) and a Mexican insurgent (Tony Musante) enter into an unstable partnership, during the Mexican Revolution.	20 December 1968 (Italy)	
Chrysthemums for a Bunch of Swines/Cristantemi per un branco di carogne	Sergio Pastore	Italian production.	21 December 1968 (Italy)	
Once Upon a Time in the West/C'era una volta il West	Sergio Leone	Italian/U.S. production. A drifter (Charles Bronson) with a score to settle and an outlaw (Jason Robards) join forces against a vicious gunman (Henry Fonda), hired by the railroad firm to run a woman (Claudia Cardinale) off her home.	21 December 1968 (Italy)	
Kill Them All and Come Back Alone/Ammazzali tutti e torna solo/Mátalos y vuelve	Enzo G. Castellari	Italian/ Spanish production. The Confederate army hires Clyde McKay (Chuck Connors) and his group of specialists, together with captain Lynch (Frank Wolff), to raid a Union fort where a treasure of gold is hidden.	31 December 1968 (Italy)	
1969
Cemetery Without Crosses/Une corde, un colt/Cimiteri senza croci	Robert Hossein	French/Italian production.	25 January 1969 (France), 19 April 1969 (Italy)	
Death on High Mountain	Fernando Cerchio	Italian/Spanish production.	25 January 1969 (Italy)	
Tepepa/Tepepa... viva la revolución	Giulio Petroni	Italian/Spanish production. An English doctor (John Steiner) interferes in the struggle between Mexican guerrilla leader Tepapa (Tomas Milian) and the local chief of police, Colonel Cascorro (Orson Welles).	31 January 1969 (Italy)	
Shadow of Sartana... shadow of your death/Passa Sartana... è la'ombra della tua morte	Demofilo Fidani	Italian production. The Randall brothers kill a judge by throwing a knife from a church tower and commit other hideous crimes. The authorities see no other solution but to send for Sartana (Jeff Cameron), who "only kills to protect from thieves, gunmen and murderers", which he does for the remainder of the movie.	15 February 1969 (Italy)	
Tierra Brava/...e intorno a lui fu morte/Pagó cara su muerte	León Klimovsky	Italian/Spanish production.	5 March 1969 (Italy)	
Law of Violence/Legge della violenza/Todos o ninguno	Gianni Crea	Italian/Spanish production.	14 March 1969 (Italy)	
In the Name of the Father/I quattro del pater noster	Ruggero Deodato	Italian production.	3 April 1969 (Italy)	
No Room to Die/Una lunga fila di croci	Sergio Garrone	Italian production. Bounty killers Brandon (Anthony Steffen) and "Preacher" (William Berger) become involved in human trafficking across the U.S.-Mexican border.	18 April 1969 (Italy)	
Hate Is My God/L'odio è il mio dio/Il nero – Hass war sein Gebet	Claudio Gora	Italian/West German production.	23 May 1969 (West Germany), 29 May 1969 (Italy)	
Heads or Tails/Testa o croce	Piero Pierotti	Italian production. Shanda (Špela Rozin) is charged with murder, raped by lawmen and left to die in the desert. She is nursed to health by outlaw Black Talisman (John Ericson), who sets out to clear her name.	4 June 1969 (Italy)	
Quintana	Vincenzo Musolini	Italian production.	13 June 1969 (Italy)	
Quinto: Fighting proud/Quinto: non ammazzare/El valor de un cobarde	León Klimovsky	Italian/Spanish production.	14 June 1969 (Italy)	
God will forgive my pistol/Dio perdoni la mia pistola	Mario Gariazzo/Leopoldo Savona	Italian production.	7 August 1969 (Italy)	
Twenty Thousand Dollars for Seven/20.000 dollari sporchi di sangue/Forajidos implacables	Alberto Cardone	Italian/Spanish production.	7 August 1969 (Italy)	
Garringo	Rafael Romero Marchent	Italian/Spanish production.	28 August 1969 (Italy)	
Sundance and the Kid/Vivi o, preferibilmente, morti/Vivo o, preferiblimente, muertos	Duccio Tessari	Italian/Spanish production. City gambler Monty (Giuliano Gemma) and Wild West farmer Ted Mulligan (Nino Benvenuti) must live together for six months, to gain an inheritance. How hard can it be?	17 September 1969 (Italy)	
Sabata/Ehi amico... c'è Sabata, hai chiuso!	Gianfranco Parolini	Italian production. Sabata (Lee Van Cleef) kills seven men, who have stolen $100,000 from a US Army safe. He returns the loot, but proceeds to blackmail the instigators, landowner Stengel (Franco Ressel) and his associates. Gunfighter Banjo (William Berger) plays both sides.	17 September 1969 (Italy)	
The Five-Man Army/Un esercito di cinque uomini	Don Taylor	Italian production. A mercenary (Peter Graves) gathers a small group of bandits, to rob a train carrying a large gold shipment, being guarded by the Mexican Army.	16 October 1969 (Italy)	Co-written by Dario Argento and Marc Richards.
The Forgotten Pistolero/Il pistolero dell'Ave Maria/Tierra de gigantes	Ferdinando Baldi	Italian/Spanish production. Sebastian (Leonard Mann) learns that he is the son of a Mexican officer, who was murdered by his wife (Luciana Paluzzi) and her lover (Alberto de Mendoza). He returns to his place of birth and his sister (Pilar Velázquez) urges him to avenge himself. Based on the Greek myth of Orestes.	17 October 1969 (Italy)	
Django the Bastard/The Stranger's Gundown/Django il bastardo	Sergio Garrone	Italian production. After thirteen years, Django (Anthony Steffen) returns for vengeance against the three officers who betrayed his unit and caused its massacre during the Civil War. He puts crosses with each traitor's name on them in the middle of the street, before killing them; and no one is sure whether Django is flesh and blood or an avenging spirit.	8 November 1969 (Italy)	
Four came to kill Sartana/...e vennero in quattro per uccidere Sartana	Demofilo Fidani	Italian production.	9 November 1969 (Italy)	
I am Sartana, your angel of death/Sono Sartana, il vostro becchino	Giuliano Carnimeo	Italian production. Bounty killer Sartana (Gianni Garko) has a price put on his head, when someone disguised as him leads a bank robbery. He sets out to find the real robbers, but must also fight off other bounty killers.	20 November 1969 (Italy)	
The Specialist/Gli specialisti/Le spécialiste/Fahrt zur Hölle ihr Halunken	Sergio Corbucci	Italian/French/West German production. Renowned gunfighter Bret Dixon (Johnny Hallyday) returns to his hometown when his brother is killed by a lynch mob.	26 November 1969 (Italy)	
A bullet for Sandoval/Quei disperati che puzzano di sudore e di morte/Los desesperados	Julio Buchs	Italian/Spanish production. Army deserter John Warner (George Hilton) forms an outlaw band and, eventually, gets even with landowner Sandoval (Ernest Borgnine), who is responsible for the death of Warner's child (with Sandoval's daughter).	26 November 1969 (Italy)	
The Price of Power/Il prezzo del potere/Muerte de un presidente	Tonino Valerii	Italian/Spanish production. In a story closely resembling the JFK assassination, Bill Willer (Giuliano Gemma) seeks evidence to bring to justice those who assassinated the president and who also killed Bill's father. He crosses paths with presidential aide MacDonald (Warren Vanders), who wants to use that evidence for political purposes.	18 December 1969 (Italy)	
Boot Hill/La collina degli stivali	Giuseppe Colizzi	Italian production. Former partners Cat (Terence Hill) and Hutch (Bud Spencer) reunite and join with former gunfighter Thomas (Woody Strode) and his circus colleagues, to help a mining community threatened by a mining boss and his hired guns.	20 December 1969 (Italy)	This film is a direct sequel to Ace High
Night of the Serpent/La notte dei serpenti	Giulio Petroni	Italian production.	23 December 1969 (Italy)	
El Puro/La taglia è tua... l'uomo l'ammazzo io/El Puro se sienta, espera y dispara	Edoardo Mulargia	Italian/Spanish production.	23 December 1969 (Italy)	
1970
And God said to Cain/...e Dio disse a Caino.../Satan der Rache	Antonio Margheriti	Italian/West German production. Gary Hamilton (Klaus Kinski) takes revenge on the men that framed him.	8 February 1970 (Italy)	
Chuck Moll/Ciakmull, l'uomo della vendetta	Enzo Barboni	Italian production. Amnesiac Chuck Moll (Leonard Mann) escapes from an asylum and arrives to a town where everybody seems to be afraid of him.	11 March 1970 (Italy)	
Challenge of the McKennas/La sfida dei MacKenna/Un dólar y una tumba	León Klimovsky	Italian/Spanish production.	21 March 1970 (Italy)	
Shango/Shango la pistola infallibile	Edoardo Mulargia	Italian production.	21 March 1970 (Italy)	
Paths of War/Franco e Ciccio sul sentiero di guerra	Aldo Grimaldi	Italian production. Comedy Western, featuring Franco and Ciccio.	26 March 1970 (Italy)	
Twenty Paces to Death/Viente pasos para la muerte/Saranda	Manuel Esteba/Antonio Mollica	Spanish/Italian production.	9 April 1970 (Italy)	
Django against Sartana/Django sfida Sartana	Pasquale Squitieri	Italian production. The innocent brother of Django (Tony Kendall) is lynched. At first, Django suspects Sartana (George Ardisson), but after a fight, they join forces to root out the real villain – a banker.	30 April 1970 (Italy)	
Awkward Hands	Rafael Romero Marchent	Italian/Spanish production.	18 May 1970 (Spain)	
One damned day at dawn... Django meets Sartana!/Quel maledetto giorno d'inverno... Django e Sartana all'ultimo sangue	Demofilo Fidani	Italian production. Sheriff Jack Rawls a.k.a. Sartana (Fabio Testi) and bounty hunter Django (Hunt Powers) have to work out some disagreements about how to fight the outlaw gangs in Black City.	25 June 1970 (Italy)	
Ringo, it's massacre time/Giunse Ringo e... fu tempo di massacro	Mario Pinzauti	Italian production.	2 August 1970 (Italy)	
La diligencia de los condenados	Juan Bosch	Italian/Spanish production. The gang of Sartana (Fernando Sancho) holds some stage passengers prisoner, at a relay station. They learn too late that the station master (Richard Harrison) is a former gunfighter.	6 August 1970 (Italy)	Based on a novel by Lou Carrigan.
Sartana's here... Trade your pistol for a coffin/C'è Sartana... vendi la pistola e comprati la bara!	Giuliano Carnimeo	Italian production. Bounty hunter Sartana (George Hilton) discovers that town boss Spencer (Piero Lulli) collects the miner's gold and then, stashes it away for himself and has bandits "rob" the transports. Several other parties are also interested in that gold, among them, gunfighter Sorrow (Charles Southwood).	7 August 1970 (Italy)	
Arizona/Arizona si scatenò... e li fece fuori tutti/Arizona vuelve	Sergio Martino	Italian/Spanish production.	14 August 1970 (Italy)	
Sartana in the Valley of Death/Sartana nella valle degli avvoltoi	Roberto Mauri	Italian production. Lee Calloway (William Berger) is a wanted man, who springs three of the Craig brothers from jail to get 50% of their robbery loot. However, both parties have hidden agendas.	15 August 1970 (Italy)	
Roy Colt and Winchester Jack	Mario Bava	Italian production.	30 August 1970 (Italy)	
Rebels of Arizona/Adiós Cjamango!/Los Rebeldes de Arizona	José Maria Zabalza	Italian/Spanish production.	7 September 1970 (Italy)	
Un par de asesinos	Rafael Romero Marchent	Italian/Spanish production. There is, actually, no character called "Sartana" in this story of several parties fighting, and dying, over robbery loot. At the end, the sole survivors – Santana (Gianni Garko), Marco (William Bogart) and Maria (Maria Silva) – live together in a cave.	11 September 1970 (Italy)	
Rough Justice/La belva	Mario Costa	Italian production.	12 September 1970 (Italy)	
Arriva Sabata!	Tulio Demicheli	Italian/Spanish production. Several parties vie for the loot of a bank robbery.	12 September 1970 (Italy)	
More dollars for the MacGregors/Ancora dollari per i McGregor/La muerte busca un hombre	José Luis Merino	Italian/Spanish production.	27 September 1970 (Italy)	
Adiós, Sabata/Indio Black, sai che ti dico... sei un gran figlio di...	Gianfranco Parolini	Italian production. Sabata (Yul Brynner; called "Indio Black" in the Italian version) helps Mexican revolutionaries steal a wagon load of gold.	30 September 1970 (Italy)	
Have a good funeral, my friend... Sartana will pay/Buon funerale, amigos!... paga Sartana/Buen funeral, amigos... paga Sartana	Giuliano Carnimeo	Italian/Spanish production. A prospector is murdered and Sartana (Gianni Garko), who witnessed the murder and eliminated the killers, protects his niece and heir (Daniela Giordano) from those that want to take advantage of her... or so it seems!	8 October 1970 (Italy)	
Chapaqua's gold/L'oro dei bravados/Chapagua	Giancarlo Romitelli	Italian/French production.	8 October 1970 (Italy)	
Twilight Avengers/I vendicatori dell'Ave Maria	Bitto Albertini	Italian production.	15 October 1970 (Italy)	
Matalo!	Cesare Canevari	Italian/Spanish production. Some outlaws hang around in a ghost town. Then arrives a stranger (Lou Castel), armed with boomerangs.	22 October 1970 (Italy)	
A man called Sledge/Sledge	Vic Morrow	Italian production. Outlaw Luther Sledge (James Garner) is enlisted to steal a gold shipment, held in a prison.	14 November 1970 (Italy)	
Django and Sartana are coming... It's the End/Arrivano Django e Sartana... è la fine	Demofilo Fidani	Italian production. Robber Burt Kelly (Gordon Mitchell) holds a young girl hostage, while he stays in a shack in the wilderness, playing cards with his own mirror image. Bounty killer Django (Chet Davies) and independent crime-fighter Sartana (Hunt Powers) both go after him and take turns, saving each other's lives. In the end, Sartana leaves all the bodies to Django to collect, for the bounty.	20 November 1970 (Italy)	
Stranger That Kneels Beside the Shadow of a Corpse/Inginocchiati straniero... I cadaveri non-fanno ombra!	Demofilo Fidani	Italian production.	27 November 1970 (Italy)	
Wanted: Sabata	Roberto Mauri	Italian production.	1 December 1970 (Italy)	
Trinity sees red/La collera del vento/Venganza Sangrienta	Mario Camus	Italian/Spanish production. Hired by land owners to kill a labor organizer during a strike among agricultural workers, Marco (Terence Hill) begins to question his mission. The story takes place in an unspecified Spanish-speaking country. None of the characters is called "Trinity".	4 December 1970 (Italy).	
The Deserter/La spina dorsale del diavolo/Davolja kicma	Burt Kennedy/Niksa Fulgosi	U.S./Italian/Yugoslavian production. Army deserter Kaleb (Bekim Fehmiu) is set to train and lead an ad-hoc group of military specialists, on an irregular raid against an Apache camp across the Mexican border.	4 December 1970 (Italy/Yugoslavia )	
A man called Apocalypse Joe/Un uomo chiamato Apocalisse Joe/Apocalipsis Joe	Leopoldo Savona	Italian/Spanish production. Joe Clifford (Anthony Steffen), a traveling actor and part-time hired gunman, inherits a gold mine from his uncle.	4 December 1970 (Italy)	
Compañeros/Vamos a matar, compañeros/Los compañeros/Zwei Compañeros	Sergio Corbucci	Italian/Spanish/West German production. Arms dealer Yolaf Peterson (Franco Nero) and a Mexican bandit-revolutionary (Tomas Milian) are forced into partnership to free an idealistic revolutionary leader, who knows the combination to a safe. They are hunted by Peterson's former business partner (Jack Palance).	18 December 1970 (Italy)	
Hey, amigo! A toast to your death/Ehi amigo... sei morto!	Paolo Bianchini	Italian production.	20 December 1970 (Italy)	
They call me Trinity/Lo chiamavano Trinità	Enzo Barboni	Italian production. A very influential comedy Western, where an outlaw (Bud Spencer), masquerading as a sheriff, finds his plans upset by the arrival of his brother (Terence Hill), a wandering drifter. Followed by "Trinity" is still my name.	22 December 1970 (Italy)	
Light the fuse... Sartana is coming/Una nuvola di polvere... Un grido di morte... Arriva Sartana/Llega Sartana	Giuliano Carnimeo	Italian/Spanish production. During a shoot-out, a large sum of gold disappears and is hidden somewhere, in the town of Mansfield. In the hunt for this treasure, many people kill each other and the last man standing is Sartana (Gianni Garko).	24 December 1970 (Italy)	
Reverend's Colt/Reverendo Colt	León Klimovsky	Italian/Spanish production.	24 December 1970 (Italy)	
1971
Kill Django... kill first/Uccidi Django... uccidi per primo!!!	Sergio Garrone	Italian production.	5 February 1971 (Italy)	
Brother Outlaw/Rimase uno solo e fu la morte per tutti	Edoardo Mulargia	Italian production.	19 February 1971 (Italy)	
Judge Roy Bean/Le juge/All'ovest di Sacramento	Jean Girault/Federico Chentrens	French/Italian production.	3 March 1971 (France), 4 March 1971 (Italy)	
Durango is coming, pay or die/Arriva Durango, paga o muori	Roberto Bianchi Montero	Italian production.	5 March 1971 (Italy)	
Bastard, Go and Kill/Bastardo... Vamos a matar	Gino Mangini	Italian production.	6 March 1971 (Italy)	
The Last Traitor/Il tredicesimo è sempre Giuda	Giuseppe Vari	Italian production.	12 March 1971 (Italy)	
Finders killers/Se t'incontro t'ammazzo	Gianni Crea	Italian production. Jack Forest (Donal O'Brien) is out to get the men who killed his father. Those men – a banker, a sheriff and a saloon owner – employ gunfighter Chris (Gordon Mitchell), to protect them. Bad move, as he turns out to be Jack's brother.	27 March 1971 (Italy)	
A Barrel Full of Dollars/Per una bara piena di dollari	Demofilo Fidani	Italian production.	1 April 1971 (Italy)	
Dig your grave, friend... Sabata's coming/Sei già cadavere Amigo... ti cerca Garringo/¡Abre tu fosa, amigo, llega Sabata!	Juan Bosch	Italian/Spanish production. A young man (Richard Harrison) decides to avenge the death of his father, at the hands of a local land baron. Enlisting the aid of a notorious, yet good-natured, bandit (Fernando Sancho), they are faced with the land baron's hired gun, Sabata.	2 April 1971 (Italy)	
They call me Hallelujah/Testa t'ammazzo, croce... sei morto. Mi chiamano Alleluja	Giuliano Carnimeo	Italian production. During the struggle against Maximilian I of Mexico, several parties vie for an elusive shipment of diamonds.	8 April 1971 (Italy)	
A Fistful of Death/Giù la testa... hombre!	Demofilo Fidani	Italian production.	17 April 1971 (Italy)	
Even Django has his price/Anche per Django le carogne hanno un prezzo	Luigi Batzella	Italian production. When his fiancée is abducted during a bank robbery, Django (Jeff Cameron) goes after the Cortez Brothers, who are hiding in a fortified cavern. He is aided by a fellow gunfighter (Gengher Gatti) and a bank employee (John Desmont), to help rescue his girl and recover the money.	8 May 1971 (Italy)	
Joe Dakota/Spara Joe.. e così sia!	Emilio Miraglia	Italian production	10 May 1971 (Italy)	
His name was King/Lo chiamavano King	Giancarlo Romitelli	Italian production. Bounty killer "King" Marley (Richard Harrison) kills one of the wanted Benson brothers. In retaliation, King's brother is killed and his sister-in-law is raped. King's vengeance, eventually, involves sheriff Foster (Klaus Kinski) and government agent Collins (Luciano Pigozzi).	18 May 1971 (Italy)	
Four gunmen of the Holy Trinity/I quattro pistoleri di Santa Trinità	Giorgio Cristallini	Italian production.	29 May 1971 (Italy)	
Terrible Day of the Big Gundown/Quel maledetto giorno della resa dei conti	Sergio Garrone	Italian production.	26 June 1971 (Italy)	
Gunman of 100 crosses/Una pistola per cento croci	Carlo Croccolo	Italian production.	3 July 1971 (Italy)	
And the Crows Will Dig Your Grave/I corvi ti scaveranno la fossa/Los buitres cavarán tu fosa	Juan Bosch	Italian/Spanish production. Wells Fargo police officer Jeff Sullivan (Craig Hill) plans to get robber Glenn Kovacs (Frank Braña), by using Glenn's half-brother (Angel Aranda). Carranza (Fernando Sancho), another Wells Fargo man, tries to beat him to it.	11 August 1971 (Italy)	
Vengeance Is a Dish Served Cold/La vendetta è un piatto che si serve freddo	Pasquale Squitieri	Italian production. Jim Bridger (Leonard Mann) kills Indians, to avenge his family. When he learns that the real culprit is Judge Perkins (Ivan Rassimov), he joins Perkin's organization, in order to destroy him.	13 August 1971 (Italy)	
Shoot the Living and Pray for the Dead/Prega il morto e ammazza il vivo	Giuseppe Vari	Italian production. John Webb (Paolo Casella) is employed by Dan Hogan (Klaus Kinski) and his gang, to help them escape to Mexico with their robbery loot. Webb – whose father has been killed by Hogan – hides the loot and makes the gang members kill each other.	13 August 1971 (Italy)	
Dead Men Ride/Anda, muchacho, spara!/El sol bajo la tierra	Aldo Florio	Italian/Spanish production. Roy Greenford (Fabio Testi) joins the gang of banker Redfield (Eduardo Fajardo) and kills them all, to get their gold. In the end, he returns the gold to the Mexican miners that it, originally, belonged to.	16 August 1971 (Italy)	
Django story/Giù le mani... carogna!	Demofilo Fidani	Italian production.	21 August 1971 (Italy)	
Return of Sabata/È tornato Sabata... hai chiuso un'altra volta/Le retour de Sabata/Sabata kehrt zurück	Gianfranco Parolini	Italian/French/West German production. With the unreliable help from saloon owner Clyde (Reiner Schöne), Sabata (Lee van Cleef) blackmails the mayor of Hobsonville (Giampiero Albertini), for dealing in counterfeit money.	3 September 1971 (Italy)	
In the Name of the Father, the Son and the Colt/In nome del padre, del figlio e della Colt/La máscare de vero	Mario Bianchi	Italian production.	5 September 1971 (Italy)	
Let's go and kill Sartana/Vamos a matar Sartana	Mario Pinzauti	Italian production.	6 September 1971 (Italy)	
Drummer of Vengeance/Il giorno del giudizio	Mario Gariazzo	Italian production. An avenger (Ty Hardin) seeks out the malefactors and confronts them with a toy drummer, before killing them.	9 September 1971 (Italy)	
Red Sun/Sole rosso/Soleil Rouge	Terence Young	Italian/French production. Bounty hunter Link Stuart (Charles Bronson) and samurai Kuroda Jubei (Toshiro Mifune) pursue Gauche (Alain Delon), who has stolen an ancient sword being intended as a gift to U.S. President Ulysses S. Grant.	15 September 1971 (France), 23 October 1971 (Italy)	
The Price of Death/Il venditore di morte	Lorenzo Gicca Palli	Italian production. A gunfighter (Gianni Garko) is hired to prove the innocence of outlaw Chester Conway (Klaus Kinski), who is to hang for a murder.	17 September 1971 (Italy)	
They call him Cemetery/Gli fumavano le Colt... lo chiamavano Camposanto	Giuliano Carnimeo	Italian production. Ranchers are terrorised by a gang of extortionists, led by a masked man. Camposanto (Gianni Garko) and Duke (William Berger), two gunfighters who respect each other, find themselves on opposing sides of the conflict.	23 September 1971 (Italy)	
Viva! Django/W Django!	Edoardo Mulargia	Italian production. With the help of a horse thief (Stelio Candelli), Django (Anthony Steffen) tracks down and kills, one by one, the men who murdered his wife.	29 September 1971 (Italy)	
Il lungo giorno della violenza/El Bandido Malpelo	Giuseppe Maria Scotese	Italian/Spanish production.	9 October 1971 (Italy)	
"Trinity" is still my name/...continuavano a chiamarlo Trinità	Enzo Barboni	Italian production. Sequel to They call me Trinity. The brothers Trinity (Terence Hill) and Bambino (Bud Spencer) make a promise to their dying father to become successful outlaws. However, they are distracted into helping a farmer family that they had previously tried to hold up.	21 October 1971 (Italy)	Awards: Goldene Leinwand in 1973
Duck, You Sucker/A Fistful of Dynamite/Giù la testa	Sergio Leone	Italian/Spanish/U.S. production. An Irish revolutionary (James Coburn) and a Mexican bandit (Rod Steiger) cross paths, during the Mexican Revolution.	29 October 1971 (Italy)	
Blindman	Ferdinando Baldi	U.S./Italian production. A gunfighter, known as the Blindman (Tony Anthony), and others are hired to escort fifty mail-order brides to a mining camp. His partners, instead, sell the women to a Mexican bandit and the Blindman goes into Mexico after them.	11 November 1971 (Italy)	
Savage Guns/Era Sam Wallach... lo chiamavano "Così sia"	Demofilo Fidani	Italian production. After his brother is killed, after witnessing the murder of a tavern owner, Sam Wallach (Robert Woods) goes after the bandit leader responsible.	11 November 1971 (Italy)	
Paid in Blood/Quelle sporche anime dannate	Luigi Batzella	Italian production.	14 November 1971 (Italy)	
My name is Mallory... "M" means death/Il mio nome é Mallory, "M" come morte	Mario Moroni	Italian production.	18 November 1971 (Italy)	
His name was Pot... But, they called him Allegria/Il suo nome era Pot... ma... lo chiamavano Allegria	Demofilo Fidani	Italian production.	26 November 1971 (Italy)	
And his name was Holy Ghost/...e lo chiamarono Spirito Santo	Roberto Mauri	Italian production.	26 November 1971 (Italy)	
Black Killer	Carlo Croccolo	Italian production. Sheriff Bud Collins (Fred Robsahm) and lawyer James Webb (Klaus Kinski) cooperate, to rid the town of the O'Hara brothers. However, they also have a secret agreement.	27 November 1971 (Italy)	
Acquasanta Joe	Mario Gariazzo	Italian production. Bounty hunter Acquasanta Joe (Lincoln Tate) vies for the reward for outlaw gang leader Donovan (Ty Hardin) – and for his woman (Silvia Monelli).	11 December 1971 (Italy)	
Un dólar para Sartana	León Klimovsky	Italian/Spanish production.	17 December 1971 (Italy)	
Sheriff of Rock Springs/Lo sceriffo di Rocksprings	Mario Sabatini	Italian production.	17 December 1971 (Italy)	
My Colt, not yours/La mia Colt ti cerca... 4 ceri ti aspettano/Un Colt por 4 cirius	Ignacio F. Iquino	Italian/Spanish production.	18 December 1971 (Spain), 15 November 1973 (Italy)	
Long Live Your Death/Viva la muerte... tua!/¡Viva la muerte... tuya!/Zwei tolle Compañeros	Duccio Tessari	Italian/Spanish/West German production. Con artist Orlowsky (Franco Nero) and bandit Lozoya (Eli Wallach) want to lay their hands on a treasure, while the journalist Mary (Lynn Redgrave) wants to get the revolution going.	22 December 1971 (Italy)	
Bad Man's River/E continuavano a fregarsi il milione di dollari/El hombre de Río Malo/Les quatro mercenaires d'El Paso	Eugenio Martín	Italian/Spanish/French production.	23 December 1971 (Italy)	
1972
Requiem for a Bounty Hunter/Lo ammazzó come un cane... ma lui rideva ancora	Angelo Pannacciò	Italian production. Rancher Nick Barton (Michael Forrest) enlists the help of Whistler (Ray O'Conner), a silent bounty hunter, to go after the outlaw gang who murdered his family.	2 January 1972 (Italy)	
Great Treasure Hunt/Monta in sella, figlio di.../Repóker de bribones	Tonino Ricci	Italian/Spanish production.	7 February 1972 (Italy)	
Ben and Charlie/Amico, stammi lontano almeno un palmo	Michele Lupo	Italian production. Ben Bellew (Giuliano Gemma) and Charlie Logan (George Eastman), a pair of small-time thieves, match wits with a Pinkerton detective (Giacomo Rossi-Stuart).	22 February 1972 (Italy)	
Thunder over El Paso/I senza Dio/Yo los mato, tú cobras la recompensa	Roberto Bianchi Montero	Italian/Spanish production. The bounty hunter Minnesota (Cristea Avram) and the wanted "El Santo" (Antonio Sabàto, Sr.) – "he likes to send people to paradise" – join forces to share $400,000 in gold ingots, taken by the bank robber Corbancho (José Jaspe). However, they both have hidden agendas.	27 February 1972 (Italy)	
You are a traitor and I'll kill you/Una cuerda al amanecer/Sei una carogna... e l'ammazzo!	Manuel Esteba	Spanish/Italian production.	4 March 1972 (Italy)	
Gunman called Dakota/Un uomo chiamato Dakota	Mario Sabatini	Italian production.	5 March 1972 (Italy)	
Beyond the Frontiers of Hate/Al di là dell'odio	Alessandro Santini	Italian production.	19 March 1972 (Italy)	
His name was Holy Ghost/Uomo avvisato mezzo ammazzato... parola di Spirito Santo/Y le llamban El Halcón	Giuliano Carnimeo	Italian/Spanish production. Spirito Santo (Gianni Garko) wins half of a Mexican goldmine, but must lend support to a revolution, in order to get to the gold.	30 March 1972 (Italy)	
It can be done, amigo/Si può fare... amigo/En el oeste se puede hacer... amigo/Amigo!... Mon colt a deux mots à te dire	Maurizio Lucidi	Italian/Spanish/French production. Hiram Coburn (Bud Spencer) helps a child (Renato Cestiè) reclaim his rightful inheritance, which turns out to be on top of an oil well.	31 March 1972 (Italy)	
Django... Adios!/Seminò morte... lo chiamavano il castigo di Dio	Roberto Mauri	Italian production. Django (Brad Harris) is helped by a Mexican revolutionary (José Torres) to prove his innocence from a bank robbery.	2 April 1972 (Italy)	The last of Roberto Mauri's series of spaghetti Westerns.
Kill the Poker Player/Hai sbagliato... dovevi uccidermi subito!	Mario Bianchi	Italian/Spanish production.	9 April 1972 (Italy)	
You are jinxed, friend ! You've met Sacramento/Sei iellato, amico hai incontrato Sacramento	Giorgio Cristallini	Italian production.	13 April 1972 (Italy)	
Prey of Vultures/La preda e l'avvoltoio/Un dólar de recompensa	Rafael Romero Marchent	Italian/Spanish production.	24 April 1972 (Italy)	
Jesse and Lester, two brothers in a place called Trinity/Jesse & Lester: due fratelli in un posto chiamato Trinità	Renzo Genta	Italian production. The brothers Jesse (Richard Harrison) and Lester (Donal O'Brien) disagree on how to use the elusive yield from their inherited gold mine. Lester wants to build a church, while Jesse wants to build a brothel.	27 April 1972 (Italy)	
Return of the Holy Ghost/Banda alla tua pelle Spirito Santo!	Roberto Mauri	Italian production.	7 May 1972 (Italy)	
Magnificent West/Il magnifico West	Gianni Crea	Italian production.	27 May 1972 (Italy)	
Trinity and Sartana are coming/Trinità e Sartana figli di...	Mario Siciliano	Italian production. Horse thief Trinity (Harry Baird) and gun-fighter Sartana (Robert Widmark) attempt some robberies, which bring them into brawls with the men of local boss Burton (Stelio Candelli). Trinity gives away the booty to beautiful farmer girl Martha (Daniela Giordani).	30 May 1972 (Italy)	
Pistol Packin' Preacher/Posate le pistole, reverendo	Leopoldo Savona	Italian production.	3 June 1972 (Italy)	
Watch out, gringo! Sabata will return/¡Judas... toma tus monedas!/Attento gringo... è tornato Sabata!	Alfonso Balcázar/Pedro Luis Ramirez	Spanish/Italian production.	4 June 1972 (Italy)	
God in heaven... Arizona on Earth/Dio in cielo... Arizona in terra/Una bala marcada	Juan Bosch	Italian/Spanish production.	26 June 1972 (Spain), 4 August 1972 (Italy)	
Two sons of Trinity/I due figli di Trinità	Osvaldo Civirani	Italian production. Comedy Western, featuring Franco and Ciccio.	26 July 1972 (Italy)	
J & S: Criminal story of an outlaw couple/La banda J.S.: cronaca criminale del Far West/Los hijos del dìa y de la noche/Die rote Sonne der Rache	Sergio Corbucci	Italian/Spanish/West German production. Relations shift between outlaw Jed (Tomas Milian) and his girlfriend, Sonny (Susan George), as they roam the West, pursued by lawman Franciscus (Telly Savalas).	11 August 1972 (Italy)	
My Horse, My Gun, Your Widow/Domani passo a salutare la tua vedova... parola di Epidemia/Tu fosa será exacta... amigo	Juan Bosch	Italian/Spanish production.	11 August 1972 (Italy)	
Man called Amen/Così sia	Alfio Caltabiano	Italian production.	11 August 1972 (Italy)	
They call him Veritas/Lo chiamavano Veritá	Luigi Perelli	Italian production.	11 August 1972 (Italy)	
Too Much Gold for One Gringo/Lo credevano uno stinco di santo/La caza del oro	Juan Bosch	Italian/Spanish production. Several outlaws await the release from prison of Carver (Manuel Guitiàn), an elderly prospector, who is believed to have hidden 28 sacks of gold 20 years earlier. Trash (Anthony Steffen) and Josè (Daniel Martín) escape with the somewhat unwilling Carver, to recover the gold. However, other parties, like the bandit Firmin Rojas (Fernando Sancho), have the same idea.	19 August 1972 (Italy)	
The West is tough, amigo... Alleluja's here/Il West ti va stretto, amico... è arrivato Alleluja/Beichtet, Freunde, Halleluja kommt/Le far west est trop petit pour toi, mon ami: Alleluja est arrivé	Giuliano Carnimeo	Italian/West German/French production. An Indian statue of political value in the Mexican Revolution is sought by: Hallelujah (George Hilton), Drake (Paolo Gozlino) and his gang, the thief Fleurette (Agata Flori) and her Scotsman partner, Archie (Lincoln Tate), and others.	30 August 1972 (Italy)	
Panhandle Calibre 38/Padella calibro 38/...e alla fine lo chiamarono Jerusalem l'implacabile	Toni Secchi	Italian production.	1 September 1972 (Italy)	
Deadly Trackers/La lunga cavalcata della vendetta	Tanio Boccia	Italian production.	4 September 1972 (Italy)	
Miss Dynamite/Tutti fratelli nel West... per parte di padre/Todos hermanos... en el Oeste	Sergio Grieco	Italian/Spanish/West German production.	7 September 1972 (Italy)	
Man of the East/...e poi lo chiarono il Magnifico/El magnifico	Enzo Barboni	Italian/French/Yugoslavian production. English gentleman Sir Thomas Fitzpatrick Phillip Moore (Terence Hill) travels to the American frontier, according to the last wishes of his late father. The members of his father's outlaw gang – Bull Schmidt (Gregory Walcott), Holy Joe (Harry Carey, Jr.) and Monkey Smith (Dominic Barto) – attempt to teach Moore to become a "real man". The free-spirited young man is soon forced to defend himself against local gunman Morton Clayton (Riccardo Pizzuti), who becomes jealous over the developing romance with a local rancher's daughter, Candida Austin (Yanti Somer).	9 September 1972 (Italy)	
A Reason to Live, a Reason to Die/Una ragione per vivere e una per morire/Un razón para vivir y una para morir/Une raison per vivre, une raison pour mourir/Sie verkaufen den Tod	Tonino Valerii	Italian/Spanish/French/West German production. During the American Civil War, an ex-colonel (James Coburn) is given a handful of war criminals, otherwise condemned to die by hanging, to get back the fort he once surrendered.	27 October 1972 (Italy)	
Gunmen and the Holy Ghost/Spirito Santo e le 5 magnifiche canaglie	Roberto Mauri	Italian production. Army lt. Robert Donovan, also called the Holy Ghost (Vassili Karis), is sent on a mission to recover missing gold. Among others, he confronts a strange gang of outlaws.	29 October 1972 (Italy)	
Life's tough, eh Providence?/La vita a volte è molto dura, vero Provvidenza?/On m'appelle Providence/Providenza-Mausefalle für zwei schräge Vögel	Giulio Petroni	Italian/French/West German production. Bounty hunter Provvidenza (Tomas Milian) collects bounty over and over again for Hurricane Kid (Gregg Palmer), because each time he helps him escape and then, catches him again. This neat arrangement is complicated by a sheriff issuing counterfeit money, a band of drunken Confederate renegades and a mercenary saloon girl (Janet Ågren).	29 October 1972 (Italy)	
Go away! Trinity has arrived in Eldorado/Scansati... a Trinità arriva Eldorado	Aristide Massaccesi	Italian production. The con man Carter (Stan Cooper) teams up with a dancer (Daniela Giordano) against a group of bandits – the Pistoleros.	12 November 1972 (Italy)	The soundtrack is composed by Giancarlo Chiaramello.
God is my Colt .45/La colt era il suo Dio/Nur Gott war sein Colt	Luigi Batzella	Italian/West German production. US Army Captain Mike Jackson (Jeff Cameron) returns to his home town, which is troubled by lawlessness, to investigate the disappearance of a fellow officer – with unexpected results.	18 November 1972 (Italy)	
Sting of the West/Te Deum/Tedeum	Enzo G. Castellari	Italian/Spanish production. The con man Tedeum (Giancarlo Prete) gets into a lot of trouble when he inherits a mine.	5 December 1972 (Italy)	
The return of Clint the Stranger/Il ritorno di Clint il solitario/El retorno de Clint el solitario/Ein einsamer kehrt zurück	Alfonso Balcázar	Italian/Spanish/West German production. Set five years after the 1967 film Clint the Stranger, Clint Murrayson (George Martin) returns to his hometown, to find it overrun with bandits terrorizing local farmers. Klaus Kinski also appears as a bounty hunter, seeking to collect the reward for Murrayson's capture.	14 December 1972 (Italy)	
What am I doing in the middle of the revolution?/Che c'entriamo noi con la rivoluzione?/¡Qué nos importa la revolución!	Sergio Corbucci	Italian/Spanish production. Two Italians, a priest (Paolo Villaggio) and a stage actor (Vittorio Gassman), get accidentally involved in the Mexican Revolution.	19 December 1972 (Italy)	
They called him Trinity/Allegri becchini... arriva Trinità	Ferdinando Merighi		19 December 1972 (Italy)	
Halleluja and Sartana strike again/Alleluja e Sartana figli di... Dio/100 Fäuste und ein Vaterunser	Mario Siciliano	Italian/West German production. In this slapstick comedy, conmen Alleluja (Ron Ely) and Sartana (Robert Widmark) pose as priests, to swindle money collected for building a church from a beautiful widow (Uschi Glas).	22 December 1972 (Italy)	
Now, they call him Sacramento/I bandoleros della dodicesima ora/Les llamaban Calamidad	Alfonso Balcázar	Italian/Spanish production. Three outlaws (Michael Forest, Fernando Bilbao, Paolo Gozlino) inadvertently help a local banker planning to evict farmers, by robbing a train carrying their mortgage payments to the bank.	23 December 1972 (Italy)	
Bounty hunter in Trinity/Un bounty killer a Trinità	Oscar Santaniello	Italian production. The townspeople of Trinity hire a bounty hunter (Jeff Cameron), to protect them from local bandits.	23 December 1972 (Italy)	
Animal called Man/Un animale chiamato uomo	Roberto Mauri	Italian production. The thief and fast gun Bill (Vassili Karis) and his strong, but slow partner John (Omero Capanna) make unsuccessful efforts to join the outlaw organization of Forester (Craig Hill). Bill gets patched up by Yvette (Gillian Bray), a doctor working as a dancer.	23 December 1972 (Italy)	
Storm rider/Il grande duello/Drei Vaterunser für vier halunken/Le Grand Duel	Giancarlo Santi	Italian/West German/French production. Philipp Wermeer (Peter O'Brien) has escaped from prison, after being framed for the murder of Saxon. He is pursued by bounty hunters, led by the relentless Hole (Antonio Casale), but is joined by a former sheriff (Lee Van Cleef), who eventually discloses the real assassin, which leads to a confrontation with Saxon's three sons.	24 December 1972 (West Germany)	Also known as The Grand Duel.
1973
Colt in the hand of the Devil/Una Colt in mano del diavolo	Gianfranco Baldanello	Italian production.	5 January 1973 (Italy)	
Fabulous Trinity/Los fabulosos de Trinidad/Alla larga amigos, oggi ho il grilletto facile...	Ignacio F. Iquino	Spanish/Italian production.	4 February 1973 (Italy)	
Anything for a friend/Amico mio frega tu... che frego io!	Demofilo Fidani	Italian production.	18 February 1973 (Italy)	
Those Dirty Dogs/Campa carogna... la taglia cresce/Los quatro de Fort Apache	Giuseppe Rosati	Italian/Spanish production. The Muslim bounty hunter Coran (Gianni Garko) and three Army men, led by Chadwell (Stephen Boyd), must work together to find a bandit (Simón Andreu), who has hijacked an arms shipment and kidnapped a woman.	1 March 1973 (Italy)	
Halleluja to Vera Cruz/Partirono preti, tornarono... curati	Bianco Manini	Italian production.	2 March 1973 (Italy)	
Los Amigos	Paolo Cavara	Italian production. "Deaf" Smith (Anthony Quinn), who is a deaf mute, and his partner, Johnny Ears (Franco Nero), are sent by Texas president Sam Houston to stop general Morton (Franco Graziosi), who plots against the annexation of Texas by the United States.	29 March 1973 (Italy)	
Man called Invincible/Lo chiamavano Tresette... giocava sempre col morto	Giuliano Carnimeo	Italian production. When Tresette (George Hilton) helps sheriff Bambi (Cris Huerta) deliver a shipment of gold, they are jailed because it is fake. He also has to face the gunfighter Twinkletoes (Alfio Caltabiano).	3 May 1973 (Italy)	
And They Smelled the Strange, Exciting, Dangerous Scent of Dollars/Sentivano uno strano, eccitante, pericoloso puzzo di dollari	Italo Alfaro	Italian production.	4 May 1973 (Italy)	
Brothers Blue/Blu Gang ...E vissero per sempre felici e ammazzati	Luigi Bazzoni	Italian/French production.	10 May 1973 (Italy/France)	
Tequila!/Uno, dos, tres... dispara otra vez	Tulio Demicheli	Italian/Spanish production. The wanted gunfighter Shoshena (Anthony Steffen) takes on, as a partner, a bum (Roberto Camardiel), because he is mistaken for a dreaded bounty hunter. They interfere in a fight between some farmers and the landowner, Di Kovan (Eduardo Fajardo) – as a part of Shoshena's plan to steal his money.	25 May 1973 (Italy)	
Executioner of God/Il giustiziere di Dio	Franco Lattanzi	Italian production.	2 June 1973 (Italy)	
Karate, Fists and Beans/Storia di karatè, pugni e fagioli/Siete contra todos	Tonino Ricci	Italian/Spanish production. Down-on-their-luck highway robbers Sam (Dean Reed) and Buddy (Chris Huerta) join with a bank robber posing as a prior and some counterfeit artists, in order to swindle a bandit (Fernando Sancho). In the ensuing brawl, they are saved by a Japanese chef (Iwao Yoshioka), who is a master at karate.	14 June 1973 (Italy)	
On the Third Day Arrived the Crow/...e il terzo giorno arrivò il Corvo	Gianni Crea	Italian production.	21 July 1973 (Italy)	
The man called Noon/Lo chiamavano Mezzogiorno/Un hombre llamado Noon	Peter Collinson	British/Italian/Spanish production.	11 August 1973 (Italy)	
Three Supermen of the West/...e cosi divennero i tre supermen del West/Los tres superhombres en el Oeste	Anthony Blond, Italo Martinenghi	Italian/Spanish production.	28 August 1973 (Italy)	
Chino/Valdez, il mezzosangue/Caballos salvajes	John Sturges	Italian/Spanish/French production.	14 September 1973 (Italy)	
The Three Musketeers of the West/Tutti per uno... botte per tutti	Bruno Corbucci	Italian production.	28 September 1973 (Italy)	
Once upon a time in the wild, wild West/C'era una volta questo pazzo, pazzo West	Franscesco Degli Espinosa	Italian production.	17 October 1973 (Italy)	
Here we go again, eh Providence?/Ci risiamo, vero Provvidenza?/El bruto, el listo y el capitán	Alberto De Martino	Italian/Spanish/French production. The bounty hunter Provvidenza (Tomas Milian) gets involved with a lady, who turns out to be the daughter of a Chinese con man.	8 November 1973 (Italy)	Sequel to: Life's tough, eh Providence?.
My name is Nobody/Il mio nome è Nessuno/Mon nom est Personne/Mein Name ist Nobody	Tonino Valerii; Sergio Leone (uncredited)	Italian/French/West German production. Aging gunfighter Jack Beauregard (Henry Fonda) is followed by a happy-go-lucky drifter (Terence Hill), whose desire to have his boyhood hero go out "in a blaze of glory" has him arrange Beauregard to face a 150-man outlaw gang, known as "The Wild Bunch".	13 December 1973 (West Germany), 21 December 1973 (Italy)	Awards: Goldene Leinwand in 1974
White Fang/Zanna Bianca/Colmillo Blanco/Croc-blanc	Lucio Fulci	Italian/Spanish/French production.	21 December 1973 (Italy)	The first entry in the White Fang cycle. Based on a story by Jack London.
Bad kids of the West/Kid, il monello del West	Tonino Ricci	Italian production. Children Western, starring Andrea Balestri.	24 December 1973 (Italy)	Won the Giffoni Film Festival, as the best adaptation, in 1976.
They still call me Amen/Mamma mia è arrivato Così Sia	Alfio Caltabiano	Italian production.	24 December 1973 (Italy)	Sequel to Man called Amen
Fasthand is still my name/Mi chiamavano "Requiescat"... ma avevano sbagliato/Mano rápida	Mario Bianchi	Italian/Spanish production. US Army Captain Jeff Madison (Alan Steel) is tortured and his comrades-in-arms massacred. He seeks vengeance together with the Indian woman, Swana (Celine Bessy).	24 December 1973 (Italy)	
For a Book of Dollars/Più forte sorelle	Mario Bianchi	Italian/Spanish production.	26 December 1973 (Italy)	
My name Is Shanghai Joe/Il mio nome è Shanghai Joe	Mario Caiano	Italian production. During his travels in the American West, recently arrived Chinese immigrant Shanghai Joe (Chen Lee) encounters Texan rancher Stanley Spencer (Piero Lulli), who has been enslaving Mexican peasants from across the border. After setting free a group of them, a price is put on his head and he is forced to face Scalped Jack (Klaus Kinski), Pedro The Cannibal (Robert Hundar) and other notorious killers.	28 December 1973 (Italy)	
Kung Fu Brothers in the wild West/Long hu zheng xi/Kung fu nel pazzo West	Man Yi Yang	Hong Kong/Italian production.	28 December 1973 (Italy)	
Six Bounty Killers for a Massacre/Sei bounty killers per una strage	Franco Lattanzi	Italian production.	28 December 1973 (Italy)	
Seven nuns in Kansas City/Sette monache a Kansas City	Marcello Zeani	Italian production.	28 December 1973 (Italy)	
1974
Don't Touch the White Woman!/Touche pas la femme blanche/Non toccare la donna bianca	Marco Ferreri	French/Italian production.	23 January 1974 (France), 12 July 1975 (Italy)	Political farce that enacts the Battle of the Little Bighorn, in Parisian settings.
Court Martial/Corte marziale	Roberto Mauri	Italian production.	12 February 1974 (Italy)	
The Crazy Bunch/Di Tresette ce n'è uno, tutti gli altri son nessuno	Giuliano Carnimeo	Italian production. Tresette (George Hilton) sneaks into an insane asylum, to find a man who holds the key to a fortune in gold.	27 April 1974 (Italy)	Sequel to Man named Invincible.
Whisky and Ghosts/Whisky e fantasmi/Fantasma en el oeste	Antonio Margheriti	Italian/Spanish production. Napoleone B Higgins (Tom Scott), a traveling snake-oil salesman on the run from Mexican bandits, encounters the ghosts of Davy Crockett, Pecos Bill and Johnny Appleseed.	10 August 1974 (Italy/Spain)	
Ten White men and one little Indian/Dieci bianchi uccisi da un piccolo indiano/Venganza Apache	Gianfranco Baldanello	Italian/Spanish production. Ringo (Fabio Testi) encounters an Indian hunting the ten men who burned his village and killed the inhabitants.	18 August 1974 (Italy)	
Carambola	Ferdinando Baldi	Italian production. A comedy Western influenced by the popular Trinity-series, mismatched gunrunners Len (Paul Smith) and Coby (Antonio Cantafora) challenge a rival smuggler (Horst Frank) in a hunt, for $500,000 reward.	13 September 1974 (Italy)	The success of the film spawned a sequel: The crazy adventures of Len and Coby.
Patience Has a Limit, We Don't/La pazienza ha un limite... noi no!/¡Caray qué palizaz!	Armando Morandi	Italian/Spanish production.	27 September 1974 (Italy)	
Challenge to White Fang/Il ritorno di Zanna Bianca/Die Teufelsschlucht der wilden Wölfe/Le retour de Buck le loup	Lucio Fulci	Italian/West German/French production.	25 October 1974 (Italy)	Sequel to "White Fang"
The Stranger and the Gunfighter/La dove non batte il sole/El Kárate, el colt y el impostor/Long hu zou tian ya	Antonio Margheriti	U.S./Italian/Spanish/Hong Kong production. A Chinese martial arts instructor (Lieh Lo) must bring back a hidden treasure, for reasons of family honor. He enlists a gunfighter/thief (Lee Van Cleef) to help him. They encounter some opposition.	19 November 1974 (Spain), 12 January 1975 (Italy)	
1975
The White, the Yellow and the Black/Il bianco, il giallo, il nero/El blanco, el amarillo y el negro/Le blanc, le jaune et le noir	Sergio Corbucci	Italian/Spanish/French production. Sheriff Edward "Black Jack" Gideon (Eli Wallach) is paired with a clumsy, but well-meaning samurai (Tomas Milian) and a wanted outlaw (Giuliano Gemma), to recover a captured Japanese show pony from a group of US Army deserters.	17 January 1975 (Italy)	
White Fang to the rescue/Zanna Bianca alla riscossa	Tonino Ricci	Italian production. A prospector (Maurizio Merli) goes after the local crime boss (Jack Palance), seeking to avenge his mining partner.	4 February 1975 (Italy)	Part of the "White Fang" cycle.
Carambola's philosophy: In the right pocket/Carambola filotto... tutti in buca	Ferdinando Baldi	Italian production.	22 February 1975 (Italy)	
Return of Shanghai Joe/Che botte, ragazzi!/Zwei durch dick und dünn	Bitto Albertini	Italian/West German production. Kung fu fighter Shanghai Joe (Cheen Lie) and medicine show man Bill Cannon (Tommy Polgár) help each other fight rancher Barnes (Klaus Kinski).	28 February 1975 (Italy)	
Cry of the Wolf/Il richiamo del lupo/La llamada del lobo	Gianfranco Baldanello	Italian/Spanish production.	13 March 1975 (Italy)	Based on a novel by Jack London.
Seven Savage Men/I sette del gruppo selvaggio	Gianni Crea	Italian production.	29 March 1975 (Italy)	
Trinity plus the clown and a guitar/Prima ti suono e poi ti sparo/Johnny, lad' mal die Gitarre durch/Der kleine Schwarze mit dem rotten Hut	Franz Antel	Italian/West German/Austrian production.	4 April 1975 (Austria), 11 April 1975 (Italy)	
Red Coat/Giubbe rosse	Joe D'Amato	Italian production. Bill Cormack (Fabio Testi), a Canadian Mountie, chases Cariboo (Guido Mannari), a wanted outlaw and fugitive across the Canadian Rockies.	24 April 1975 (Italy)	
Ten Killers Came from Afar/Il mio nome è Scopone e faccio sempre cappotto	Juan Bosch	Italian/Spanish production.	5 June 1975 (Italy)	
Four of the Apocalypse/I quatro dell'Apocalisse	Lucio Fulci	Italian production. Stubby Preston (Fabio Testi), a gambler and conman, leads a group of misfits (Lynne Frederick, Harry Baird and Michael J. Pollard) through the Utah Territory, while pursued by Chaco (Tomas Milian), the Mexican bandit.	12 August 1975 (Italy)	
White Fang and the gold diggers/La spacconata	Alfonso Brescia	Italian production.	16 August 1975 (Italy)	Part of the "White Fang" cycle.
Cipolla Colt/El cibollero/Zwiebel-Jack räumt auf	Enzo G. Castellari	Italian/Spanish/West German production.	25 August 1975 (Italy)	
Tiger from the River Kwai/La tigre venuta dal fiume Kwai	Franco Lattanzi	Italian production.	23 September 1975 (Italy)	
Take a Hard Ride/La parola di un fuorilegge... è legge	Antonio Margheriti	Italian/U.S. production. A lone cowboy and trail expert (Jim Brown) is pursued by a bounty hunter (Lee Van Cleef), after he is entrusted with a small fortune by his employer. He also encounters a gambler (Fred Williamson), a half-breed Indian (Jim Kelly) and a woman (Catherine Spaak), who also attempt to con him out of the money.	10 October 1975 (Italy)	
Young guns go West/L'ostaggio	Luigi Valanzano	Italian production.	2 December 1975 (Italy)	
A Genius, Two Partners and an Idiot/Un genio, due compari, un pollo/Un génie, deux associés, une cloche/Nobody ist der Grösste	Damiano Damiani; Sergio Leone (uncredited)	Italian/French/West German production. Conman Joe Thanks (Terence Hill) joins forces with Bill Locomotiva (Robert Charlebois) and Lucy (Miou-Miou) to steal $300,000 from Major Cabot (Patrick McGoohan), a corrupt U.S. Army officer.	19 December 1975 (Italy)	Awards: Goldene Leinwand in 1978
Get Mean	Ferdinando Baldi	United States/Italian/Spanish production. A nameless gunfighter, known as The Stranger (Tony Anthony), is hired to safely escort a princess (Diana Lorys) across Spain.	21 December 1975 (Italy)	
White Fang and the hunter/Zanna Bianca e il cacciatore solitario	Alfonso Brescia	Italian production.	31 December 1975 (Italy)	Part of the "White Fang" cycle.
1976
Keoma/Keoma il vendicatore	Enzo G. Castellari	Italian production. Returning to his home, following the end of the American Civil War, Keoma (Franco Nero) finds the bordertown under the control of an outlaw gang, led by ex-Confederate soldier Caldwell (Donald O'Brien), as well as Keoma's three half-brothers. Attempting to free the town from Caldwell's gang, Keoma joins his father's former ranch hand to run Caldwell and his brothers out of town.	25 November 1976 (Italy)	Widely considered to be one of the last great spaghetti Westerns produced by an Italian studio, the film was later honored at the Venice Film Festival, on 31 August 2007.
Apache Woman/Una donna chiamata Apache	Giorgio Mariuzzo	Italian production. A US Cavalry officer (Al Cliver) rescues an Apache woman (Yara Kewa) from gun runner Honest Jeremy (Corrado Olmi) and his gang.	10 December 1976 (Italy)	
God's gun/Diamante lobo/Ekdach haelohim	Gianfranco Parolini	Italian/Israelian production. A gunfighter (Lee Van Cleef) returns to avenge the death of his twin brother, a local priest, as well as to protect a mother (Sybil Danning) and son (Leif Garrett) from local outlaw Sam Clayton (Jack Palance).	20 December 1976 (Italy)	
1977
Macho killers/El Macho	Marcello Andrei	Italian production. Gambler El Macho (Carlos Monzón) is hired by the sheriff and a banker, to infiltrate the outlaw gang of Duke (George Hilton).	12 May 1977 (Italy)	
California/Lo chiamavano California	Michele Lupo	Italian/Spanish production. Michael "California" Random (Giuliano Gemma) is forced to become an outlaw, after being released from a prisoner-of-war camp, at the end of the American Civil War.	16 July 1977 (Italy)	
Mannaja	Sergio Martino	Italian production. A machete-wielding bounty hunter (Maurizio Merli), on the trail of outlaw Burt Craven (Donald O'Brien), is hired by the owner of a local silver mine to find his missing daughter, Debra (Sonja Jeannine).	13 August 1977 (Italy)	
1978
Silver saddle/Sella d'argento	Lucio Fulci	Italian production. Bounty hunter Roy Blood (Giuliano Gemma) becomes involved in a plot to kidnap the nephew of the land baron, who had his father killed when he was a boy.	20 April 1978 (Italy)	
China 9, Liberty 37/Clayton Drumm	Monte Hellman	Italian/Spanish production. A gunfighter (Fabio Testi), sentenced to hang, is allowed to go free, in exchange for agreeing to murder local rancher Matthew Sebanek (Warren Oates). However, unable to go through with the arrangement, he instead goes on the run. Joined later by Matthew's wife, Catherine (Jenny Agutter), he is chased down by her husband along with his former employers.	4 August 1978 (Italy)	
La ciudad maldita	Juan Bosch	Italian/Spanish production.	29 November 1978 (Italy)	Based on the novel by Dashiell Hammett
Zanna Bianca e il grande Kid	Vito Bruschini	Italian production.	15 December 1978 (Italy)	Part of the "White Fang" cycle.
1980s-1990s
Comin' at ya!			(1981)	
Buddy goes West			(1981)	
Tex and the Lord of the Deep			(1985)	
Man Hunt		neo-Western	(1985)	
Django 2: il grande ritorno			(1987)	
White Apache			(1987)	
Scalps			(1987)	
They call me Renegade		neo-Western	(1987)	
Lucky Luke			(1991)	
Troublemakers			(1994)	
Sons of Trinity			(1995)	
Jonathan of the Bears			(1995)	
Gunslinger's Revenge			(1998)	

The Spanish comedy film 800 Balas or 800 Bullets (2002 AD) follows performers at a Western themed tourist attraction in Almería, Spain, where the majority of Spaghetti Westerns were filmed, including a former stuntman who had worked on Leone's films.

== See also ==
- List of spaghetti Western filmmakers
- List of Euro-Western films
