= List of spaghetti Western filmmakers =

This is a list of filmmakers who appeared in spaghetti Western films.

== Notable personalities ==
=== Actors ===
- Mario Adorf
- Chelo Alonso
- Ángel Álvarez
- Leo Anchóriz
- Ursula Andress
- Tony Anthony
- R. G. Armstrong
- Tina Aumont
- Raf Baldassarre
- Brigitte Bardot
- Walter Barnes
- Rik Battaglia
- Femi Benussi
- Iris Berben
- William Berger
- Jack Betts
- Martine Beswick
- Erika Blanc
- José Bódalo
- Frank Braña
- Mario Brega
- Charles Bronson
- Lee Burton
- Yul Brynner
- José Calvo
- Claudia Cardinale
- Joseph Cotten
- Mark Damon
- Luis Dávila
- Alain Delon
- Clint Eastwood
- George Eastman
- Jack Elam
- Eduardo Fajardo
- Henry Fonda
- Franco Franchi
- Horst Frank
- Michael Forest
- Ida Galli
- Tito García
- Gianni Garko
- Giuliano Gemma
- Anthony Ghidra
- Leo Gordon
- Franco Graziosi
- Brett Halsey
- Ty Hardin
- Mickey Hargitay
- Richard Harrison
- Craig Hill
- Terence Hill
- George Hilton
- Robert Hossein
- Cris Huerta
- Robert Hundar
- Jeffrey Hunter
- Luis Induni
- Ciccio Ingrassia
- John Ireland
- Steve Kanaly
- Ella Karin
- Olga Karlatos
- Tony Kendall
- Klaus Kinski
- Marianne Koch
- Frank Latimore
- John Phillip Law
- Peter Lee Lawrence
- Friedrich von Ledebur
- Marco Leonardi
- Geoffrey Lewis
- Lo Lieh
- Helga Liné
- Lorella De Luca
- Piero Lulli
- Nicoletta Machiavelli
- Guy Madison
- Leonard Mann
- Peter Martell
- Conrado San Martín
- George Martin
- Jean Martin
- José Manuel Martín
- Elsa Martinelli
- Vonetta McGee
- Patrick McGoohan
- Toshiro Mifune
- Tomas Milian
- Gloria Milland
- Miou-Miou
- Soledad Miranda
- Cameron Mitchell
- Gordon Mitchell
- Antonio Molino Rojo
- Ricardo Montalbán
- Maria Monti
- Al Mulock
- Tatsuya Nakadai
- Nieves Navarro
- Rosalba Neri
- Franco Nero
- Alex Nicol
- Loredana Nusciak
- Donald O'Brien
- Jack Palance
- Luciana Paluzzi
- Mimmo Palmara
- Nello Pazzafini
- James Philbrook
- Luigi Pistilli
- Wayde Preston
- Edmund Purdom
- Anthony Quinn
- Giovanna Ralli
- Ivan Rassimov
- Rada Rassimov
- Lynn Redgrave
- Dean Reed
- Fernando Rey
- Burt Reynolds
- Jason Robards
- Lorenzo Robledo
- Giacomo Rossi Stuart
- Luciano Rossi
- Antoine Saint-John
- Enrico Maria Salerno
- Aldo Sambrell
- Conrado San Martín
- Pedro Sanchez
- Fernando Sancho
- Telly Savalas
- Charles Southwood
- Bud Spencer
- Ringo Starr
- Anthony Steffen
- Benito Stefanelli
- Rod Steiger
- Woody Strode
- José Suárez
- Fabio Testi
- Marilù Tolo
- Jean-Louis Trintignant
- Romolo Valli
- Lee Van Cleef
- Dan van Husen
- Pilar Velázquez
- Linda Veras
- Gian Maria Volonté
- Eli Wallach
- David Warbeck
- Patrick Wayne
- Orson Welles
- Frank Wolff
- Ken Wood
- Robert Woods
- Richard Wyler

=== Directors ===
- Alfonso Balcázar
- Gianfranco Baldanello
- Ferdinando Baldi
- Enzo Barboni
- Mario Bava
- Luigi Bazzoni
- Mario Bianchi
- Tanio Boccia
- Alfonso Brescia
- Mario Caiano
- Mario Camus
- Giorgio Capitani
- Alberto Cardone
- Giuliano Carnimeo
- Enzo G. Castellari
- Tonino Cervi
- Nando Cicero
- Giuseppe Colizzi
- Bruno Corbucci
- Sergio Corbucci
- Massimo Dallamano
- Damiano Damiani
- Alberto De Martino
- Giovanni Fago
- Giorgio Ferroni
- Demofilo Fidani
- Lucio Fulci
- Franco Giraldi
- Romolo Guerrieri
- Terence Hill
- Robert Hossein
- Ignacio F. Iquino
- León Klimovsky
- Umberto Lenzi
- Sergio Leone
- Carlo Lizzani
- Maurizio Lucidi
- Michele Lupo
- Antonio Margheriti
- Sergio Martino
- Bruno Mattei
- Domenico Paolella
- Gianfranco Parolini, often credited as Frank Kramer
- Giulio Petroni
- Giulio Questi
- Giancarlo Santi
- Leopoldo Savona
- Sergio Sollima
- Pasquale Squitieri
- Giorgio Stegani
- Duccio Tessari
- Tonino Valerii
- Florestano Vancini
- Giuseppe Vari
- Terence Young
- Primo Zeglio

=== Composers ===
- Luis Bacalov
- Stelvio Cipriani
- Guido & Maurizio De Angelis
- Francesco De Masi
- Gianni Ferrio
- Nico Fidenco
- Fabio Frizzi
- Marcello Giombini
- Coriolano Gori
- Lallo Gori
- Angelo Francesco Lavagnino
- Franco Micalizzi
- Ennio Morricone
- Bruno Nicolai
- Riz Ortolani
- Piero Piccioni
- Roberto Pregadio
- Gian Franco Reverberi
- Gian Piero Reverberi
- Carlo Rustichelli
- Carlo Savina
- Armando Trovajoli
- Piero Umiliani
