= Gianfranco Clerici =

Italian screenwriter

- Born: 29 July 1941 (age 85); Bergamo, Kingdom of Italy
- Occupation: Screenwriter
- Writing career
- Pen name: Frank Clark, Mark Davis
- Period: 1966—present
- Genres: Exploitation, horror, action
- Notable works: Cannibal Holocaust; Don't Torture a Duckling; The House on the Edge of the Park

Gianfranco Clerici (Italian: [dʒaɱˈfraŋko ˈklɛːritʃi]; born 29 July 1941) is an Italian writer of numerous screenplays for Italian film and television productions. He has collaborated with several directors of exploitation cinema, including Lucio Fulci and Ruggero Deodato. His scripts include the 1980 film Cannibal Holocaust, directed by Deodato.

== Biography ==
Clerici was born in Bergamo. He began his career writing genre films, such as spy thrillers (popularised by the James Bond series) and spaghetti westerns. As genre films fell out of favour with audiences, he moved on to writing giallo films, including Don't Torture a Duckling and later The New York Ripper, both directed by Lucio Fulci. He also wrote several crime films, including Blazing Magnums and Weapons of Death.

Toward the end of the nineteen seventies, Clerici began to write scripts for more exploitative films, such as Emanuelle Around the World and Nazi Love Camp 27. Also around this time, Clerici began his famous collaboration with director Ruggero Deodato. He wrote the scripts for Last Cannibal World and The House on the Edge of the Park.

Another Deodato collaboration, Cannibal Holocaust, became his most famous screenplay due to the controversy the film caused upon its release. Ten days after its release, the film was seized, and Clerici, Deodato, the film's producers, and a representative of the distribution company were arrested for obscenity. Deodato was later charged with murder after claims had been made that actors were genuinely slain for the production. When these charges were proven false, all defendants were fined and received a four-month suspended sentence after being convicted of obscenity.

Clerici continued writing screenplays throughout the nineteen-eighties for both theatrical and television productions. His last projects were television movies and several television series.

== Filmography ==
Year	Title	Role	Notes
1967	Adios, Hombre	Pablo	Uncredited
1971	Anche per Django le carogne hanno un prezzo	Pedro Ramirez	
1971	Paid in Blood	Jerry Shannon	
1972	God Is My Colt .45	Manuel	
1973	Simbad e il califfo di Bagdad		(final film role)
