= Shadow of Sartana ... Shadow of Your Death =

1969 Italian Western film

- Poster
- Directed by: Demofilo Fidani
- Starring: Jeff Cameron
- Release date: 1969

Shadow of Sartana ... Shadow of Your Death (Italian: Passa Sartana... è l'ombra della tua morte) is a 1969 Italian Spaghetti Western directed and written by Demofilo Fidani (credited as Sean O'Neal as director, and as Miles Deem as writer...). The film is also known as Sartana and His Shadow of Death.

== Plot ==
In order to have the local authorities of Silver City, a small American town on the Mexican border, retrieve a bounty on himself, Sartana has to kill the Randall Brothers, whose gang terrorises the inhabitants.

== Cast ==
- Jeff Cameron as Sartana
- Benito Pacifico (credited as Dennys Colt) as "Baby Face" Randall
- Paolo Figlia (credited as Frank Fargas) as Benny Randall

== Production ==
It was released in 1969 along with Fidani's other "Sartana" film, ...e vennero in quattro per uccidere Sartana! The film was shot in six days. The film cast features Simonetta Vitelli (credited as Simone Blondell, as often, who happens to be the director's daughter in real life. The director himself appears in the film in the role of the town mayor.

== Reception ==
An Italian review of the time finds that "it is a film of mediocre quality". A retrospective review on the Spaghetti Western Database states that "Aristide Massaccesi (that is Joe d'Amato) keeps his camera as busy as the stuntmen, constantly looking for odd zooms and angles, making the very best of the Lazio locations (mostly sandpits and puddles). The protracted fistfight in the mud which concludes the movie, is well-performed and well-shot. Lallo Gori's score sounds over-familiar and probably is no more than a series of variations on existing tracks, but it suits the movie pretty well."
