= Passeport diplomatique agent K 8 =

- Film poster
- Directed by: Robert Vernay
- Written by: Maurice Dekobra (novel); Solange Térac (dialogue)
- Cinematography: Paul Soulignac
- Music by: Raphaël Biondi
- Release date: 1965
- Countries: France; Italy
- Language: French

Passeport diplomatique agent K 8/Operation Diplomatic Passport is a 1965 French and Italian spy film thriller directed by Robert Vernay. It was based on the 1959 novel by Maurice Dekobra.

== Cast ==
- Roger Hanin as Mirmont
- Christiane Minazzoli as Eva Dolbry
- Lucien Nat as Professeur Wilkowski
- René Dary as Chef de la D.S.T.
- Antonio Passalia as Serge Alerio (as Anthony Pass)
- René Blancard as Raddel
- Yves Barsacq as Le laborantin
- Donald O'Brien as Dolbry
- Madeleine Lambert as La tante
- Laurence Aubray
- Denise Bataille
- Henri Coutet
- Robert Favart
- Lucien Frégis
- Clément Harari
- Claude Jenner
- Antoine Marin
- Charles Millot
- Jacqueline Rivière
- Michel Salina
