= Donald O'Brien (actor) =

Irish-French actor (1930-2018)

- Born: Donal Timothée O'Brien; 15 September 1930; Pau, Pyrénées-Atlantiques, France
- Died: 23 April 2018 (aged 87); Andernos-les-Bains, France
- Citizenship: France; Ireland
- Occupation: Actor
- Years active: 1948–1994

Donal Timothée O'Brien (15 September 1930 – 23 April 2018), commonly known as Donald O'Brien, was an Irish-French actor who appeared in dozens of film, stage, and television roles over a 40-year career. He was particularly known for his performances in Spaghetti Western films of the late-1960s and '70s, as well as later appearances in other Italian genre productions.

== Early life ==
O'Brien was born in Pau, Pyrénées-Atlantiques in France on 15 September 1930. His Irish-born father had been a US Army cavalry officer and left the service after being wounded in the Spanish–American War. His father then returned to Ireland with the pension he received for his military service, sold the family farm and retired to the South of France where he eventually met and married an English governess. O'Brien's family moved around during the next few years before settling in the country's northern coast. During the Second World War, and the Nazi occupation of France, his family fled the country to Dublin, Ireland. It was during this period that one of O'Brien's brothers, among the dozen Irish volunteers serving in the Royal Air Force, was killed in action.

Growing up, he was an admirer of fellow Irishmen William Butler Yeats and Michael Collins, French adventurer André Malraux, composer Maurice Ravel, the Italian artist Giorgio de Chirico, German boxer Max Schmeling, English actor Sir Laurence Olivier and especially handicapped Second World War ace Douglas Bader.

== Career ==
=== Early stage and film career ===
In the autumn of 1948, O'Brien attended grammar school in Dublin where he was studying for final exam. He sat for his matriculation, for "a first-class ticket" to university, but failed in mathematics. Instead of taking classes for another year, he decided instead to join a drama school. He received leading roles for several local stage performances and, after joining the Dublin Gate Theatre, was involved with productions headed by Irish dramatist Micheál Mac Liammóir. O'Brien's profile was significantly raised while with the Gate Theatre, however, he grew dissatisfied with continuously being cast in walk-on roles. He decided to move to France where found employment with the US Army in Paris as an office worker. O'Brien was part of a boxing club while in Dublin and later involved in a fight with a German all-in-wrestler at a café at Place Pigalle.

In 1953, the 23-year-old O'Brien made his first appearance in a feature film, Anatole Litvak's war drama Act of Love, in which he had a brief speaking role. He spent the next few years in France and had minor roles in several other films including The Wretches (1960), Saint Tropez Blues (1961), Dynamite Jack (1961), Tales of Paris (1962) and, in an uncredited role, as an English priest in Robert Bresson's The Trial of Joan of Arc (1962); he also made his French television debut guest starring on L'inspecteur Leclerc enquête. The following year, he had another brief role as a Wehrmacht Feldwebel in The Train (1964), which so impressed director John Frankenheimer that he cast O'Brien as a supporting character in Grand Prix (1966), his first break-out role, co-starring James Garner and Eva Marie Saint. O'Brien credited Burt Lancaster with helping himself and other younger actors on the set of The Train.

Now that was a guy, terrific. I've worked with some Hollywood actors, but he was worth all of them. He used to be a circus acrobat. He had this marvellous physique, and while other actors would choose to act like primadonnas when it came to dangerous scenes, Lancaster would do most of the stuff himself. And he was a friendly guy, always helping us little-knowns when we had problems. This was one of my first more important parts and I was very unsure of myself. He was always telling us what we could do to improve our stuff. A great guy.

His later Grand Prix co-star James Garner, however, struck him as,

..a very good-looking fellow, all the girls went crazy for him, and a good actor at that, but he, like others I used to work with, seemed to be self-conscious and nervous, for no discernible reason. I mean, these guys were famous and successful. But they often behaved like little girls when it came to things like, Why is he getting a longer close-up and I don't, stuff like that. I mean, this may be important when this one close-up is all the screen time you have, but they are the leading players, so why do they behave that way? I never understood that...

In between the two projects, he played character roles in several action and war films, mostly French-Italian co-productions, including Weekend at Dunkirk, Passeport diplomatique agent K 8, La Métamorphose des cloportes, Three Rooms in Manhattan, Nick Carter and Red Club, La Vie de chateau and La Ligne de démarcation. O'Brien played an RAF pilot, much like his late brother, in the latter film. He also travelled to Yugoslavia to work on Jean Dréville's La Fayette.

=== Leading man in Spaghetti Westerns ===
In 1967, O'Brien was brought to Italy to star in Sergio Sollima's cult Spaghetti Western Run, Man, Run! with Tomas Milian. His portrayal of ex-American lawman turned soldier of fortune Nathaniel Cassidy led to future leading roles in the genre for a number of years. Shortly after filming, he was interviewed in the 1968 television documentary Western, Italian Style. Sollima, according to O'Brien, was "considered to be the intellectual among the Western filmmakers. I enjoyed working with him. He was a very intelligent and gifted man." It was during his years working in Italy that he changed his given name from "Donal" to "Donald", given his film contracts and credits frequently misspelled his name, banks would refuse to cash his checks under his birth name. He ended up having to the embassy to have a new passport issued with "Donald" in parentheses.

By the early 1970s, however, the genre was already starting its slow decline and saw O'Brien, usually a villain (or occasional anti-hero), in increasingly low-budget productions such as Giuseppe Vari's The Last Traitor (1971), with Maurice Poli and Dino Strano, Paid in Blood (1971) with Jeff Cameron and Sheriff of Rock Springs (1971) with Cosetta Greco and Richard Harrison. He made another picture with Jeff Cameron, God Is My Colt .45 (1972), two with William Berger, Kung Fu Brothers in the Wild West (1973) and The Executioner of God (1973), and Six Bounty Killers for a Massacre (1973) with Attilio Dottesio and Robert Woods. He later recalled having a somewhat strained relationship with Berger, mostly due to his drug issues, and was given parts originally intended for the older actor when was either unable to perform or had been arrested. O'Brien also starred in one of his first non-western roles, in the Italian horror film Il sesso della strega, as the investigating police inspector.

That same year, O'Brien was asked by Harrison to co-star in his own Spaghetti Western, Two Brothers in Trinity (1973), which was co-directed by Renzo Genta. In the film, O'Brien played devout Mormon missionary Lester O'Hara, half-brother of Harrison's womanising amoral character Jesse Smith. The next year, he had supporting role White Fang to the Rescue (1974) and Challenge to White Fang (1974), the latter being his first film with Lucio Fulci. He was again cast by Fulci in Four of the Apocalypse (1975). O'Brien had starring roles in the last few "twilight" Spaghetti Westerns, Keoma (1977), A Man Called Blade (1977) and Fulci's fourth and final western They Died with Their Boots On (1978). O'Brien called Fulci one of his most favourite directors to work with and was deeply saddened when learning of his death in a 1996 interview calling him "a truly original human being with a great love for cinema".

=== Foray into exploitation and horror films ===
While filming his last Spaghetti Westerns, O'Brien appeared in one of Joe D'Amato's entries of the Emanuelle series, Emanuelle and the Last Cannibals (1977), as white Safari hunter Donald McKenzie. In the film, he and his wife Maggie, played by another one-time Spaghetti Western star Susan Scott, encounter Emanuelle (Laura Gemser) in the Amazon and join her expedition to find a lost tribe of cannibals. He also played the villainous Nazi commandant in Marino Girolami's WWII farce Kakkientruppen (1977), police officer Sgt. Stricker in Gianfranco Parolini's Yeti: Giant of the 20th Century (1977), mercenary Major Hagerty in Joe D'Amato's Tough To Kill (1978) and as the SS Commander in Enzo G. Castellari's The Inglorious Bastards (1978). One of O'Brien's co-stars, Bo Svenson, taught him how to say several lines in German for the film. In 1979, O'Brien starred as an exorcist the nunsploitation film Images in a Convent, another D'Amato picture, which would be the first of many future religious-themed roles. Over the next year, he appeared in two films by Marino Girolami. The first was a cameo appearance in the sex comedy Sesso profondo and the second, a much larger role, in Zombie Holocaust as the main villain Dr. Obrero. His depiction of the "mad scientist" became very popular among horror fans and remains one of the most infamous characters in the genre.

=== Later career in Italian cinema ===
O'Brian starred in his first American production, the television film The Day Christ Died, as a Roman soldier in 1980. Later that year, while staying in Parisian hotel, he slipped in the bathroom and hit his head. He was in a coma for three days and discovered half of his body was paralysed shortly after waking up. It took him nearly four years to recover from his injuries though he would have limited mobility for the rest of his life. This would also reduce the range of roles he could play.

He made his return to acting in the 1980s post-apocalyptic films The New Gladiators and 2020 Texas Gladiators directed by Lucio Fulci and Joe D'Amato respectively. In D'Amato's film, he played the main villain, the Dark One. The death scene for his character featured an elaborate special effect scene for the time, in which his skull was "cracked open" by an axe, but the producers felt it was too over the top and cut it from the film. His handicap continued to trouble him over the years, being necessary to use a walking stick, and as a result his appearances became sporadic during the rest of the decade. In 1986, he played another "mad scientist" in Sergio Martino's science fiction film Vendetta dal futuro/ aka "Fists of Steel". He also played a supporting part, as Pietro d'Assisi, in The Name of the Rose directed by Jean-Jacques Annaud that same year. Two years later, he played the mad housekeeper Valkos in Ghosthouse produced by Joe D'Amato's company Filmirage.

In 1990, O'Brien was cast as a Sicilian baron in Marco Modugno's Il Briganti, among the locations filmed included Hadrian's Villa, however the film was never released. He had roles in three other films; the historical drama Una vita scellerata, the post-apocalyptic film Flight from Paradise, and the fantasy film Quest for the Mighty Sword, the latter again directed by Joe D'Amato, in which he played Gunther, a mad villainous king suffering from a disease similar to smallpox. He was also supposed to appear in a somewhat risque cameo for Tinto Brass' erotic film Paprika but his scene was lost on the cutting room floor.

=== Semi-retirement ===
His last regular film roles were in The Devil's Daughter a.k.a. "The Sect" (1991), Return from Death (Frankenstein 2000) (1992) and Sparrow (1993). As he became more active, however, it was around this time that O'Brien suffered another accident. While walking on a beach with two of his brothers, he attempted a short sprint but fell and was unable to get back up. His brothers were able to get him to a hospital where it was discovered that the hip bones on one side of his body were severely damaged due to being overly stressed.

In March 1996, he gave a rare interview with Euro Trash Cinema, a popular European exploitation film magazine, in which he discussed his early life and career, former co-stars and his thoughts on the state of the Italian film industry. His last film was Honey Sweet Love, in 1994.

== Later life and death ==
O'Brien retired to Andernos-les-Bains, France in the mid-1990s. For several years, he was falsely reported to have died of a heart attack in Rome in November 2003.

He died in Andernos-les-Bains, aged 88, on April 23, 2018.

== Filmography ==
=== Film ===
Year	Title	Role	Notes
1960	The Wretches		
1961	Saint Tropez Blues	Todd Anderson	
1961	Dynamite Jack		
1962	Tales of Paris		(segment "Ella")
1962	The Trial of Joan of Arc	English Priest	Uncredited
1963	Ballade pour un voyou		
1964	The Train	Sgt. Schwartz	
1964	Weekend at Dunkirk	British Officer	
1965	Passeport diplomatique agent K 8	Dolbry	
1965	Hail, Mafia	Mafia Thug	
1965	Cloportes	Gallery Visitor	
1965	Three Rooms in Manhattan	Diner Cook	
1965	Nick Carter and Red Club		
1966	A Matter of Resistance	American Officer	Uncredited
1966	The Man from Interpol	Polard	
1966	Martin Soldat	Captain Carruthers	
1966	Grand Prix	Wallace Bennett	
1967	The Night of the Generals	German Officer	Uncredited
1968	Run, Man, Run!	Nathaniel Cassidy	
1971	The Last Traitor	Captain Ned Carter	
1971	Finders Killers	Jack Forest	
1971	Paid in Blood	Lee Rast	
1971	Sheriff of Rock Springs	Jones	
1972	God Is My Colt .45	Collins	
1972	Two Brothers in Trinity	Lester O'Hara	
1973	Il Giustiziere di Dio	Frank	
1973	Sex of the Witch	Inspector	
1973	Six Bounty Killers for a Massacre	Frank	
1973	Kung Fu Brothers in the Wild West	Outlaw	
1974	Challenge to White Fang	Liverpool	
1974	White Fang to the Rescue	Harold	
1975	Four of the Apocalypse	Sheriff of Salt Flat	
1975	Giochi erotici di una famiglia per bene	Prof. Riccardo Rossi	
1976	Keoma	Caldwell	
1977	A Man Called Blade	Burt Craven	
1977	Emanuelle and the Last Cannibals	Donald McKenzie	
1977	Yeti: Giant of the 20th Century	Sgt. Stricker	
1977	Kakkientruppen	Comandante	
1978	The Inglorious Bastards	SS Commander	
1978	Silver Saddle	Fletcher	
1978	Tough to Kill	Major Hagerty	
1980	Flying Sex	Mr. Slider	
1980	Zombie Holocaust	Dr. Obrero	
1981	Images in a Convent	Exorcist	
1982	2020 Texas Gladiators	Black One	
1984	Warriors of the Year 2072	Monk	
1984	Panther Squad	General	
1986	Vendetta dal futuro	Professor Olster	
1986	The Name of the Rose	Pietro d'Assisi	
1988	Ghosthouse	Valkos	
1989	Mortacci	Archibald Williams	
1990	Una vita scellerata	Bernardino, l'ermita	
1990	Flight from Paradise		
1990	Quest for the Mighty Sword	Prince Gunther	
1991	Return from Death (Frankenstein 2000)	Ric	
1991	The Devil's Daughter	Justice Jonathan Ford	
1993	Sparrow		
1994	Il Briganti	Sicilian Baron	(final film role)
1994	Honey Sweet Love	Officer	

=== Television ===
Year	Film	Role	Notes
1963	L'inspecteur Leclerc enquête	Dalton	Episode: "Voir Paris et mourir"
1980	The Day Christ Died	Roman Soldier	Television film
