= ...e vennero in quattro per uccidere Sartana! =

1969 film by Demofilo Fidani

- Directed by: Demofilo Fidani
- Screenplay by: Demofilo Fidani; Mila Vitelli
- Story by: Demofilo Fidani
- Starring: Jeff Cameron; Franco Ricci; Benito Pacifico
- Cinematography: Luciano Tovoli
- Edited by: Piera Bruni
- Music by: Italo Fischetti
- Production company: Tarquinia Film
- Release date: 1969
- Country: Italy

...e vennero in quattro per uccidere Sartana! (...and four of them came to kill Sartana!) is an Italian 1969 Spaghetti Western film directed by Demofilo Fidani.

== Release ==
...e vennero in quattro per uccidere Sartana! is not an official release in the Sartana film series. It was released in 1969 along with Fidani's other "Sartana" film Shadow of Sartana ... Shadow of Your Death. The film was re-issued three years after its release in 1972 with the title Beyond the Frontiers of Hate with a director credited as in promotions and advertising as Alessandro Santini. Thomas Weisser commented on the reissue in his book on Spaghetti Westerns, stating that most of the reissues of the film have no credits at all.

== Reception ==
In a retrospective review, Weisser commented that Jeff Cameron "sleepwalks" through the film and declared that director Demofilo was a "cherished industry hack."

== Footnotes ==
=== References ===
- Weisser, Thomas (2005). Spaghetti Westerns--the Good, the Bad and the Violent: A Comprehensive, Illustrated Filmography of 558 Eurowesterns and Their Personnel, 1961-1977. McFarland. ISBN 0786424427.
