= God Is My Colt .45 =

1972 film

- Directed by: Luigi Batzella
- Cinematography: Giorgio Montagnani
- Music by: Vasili Kojucharov
- Distributed by: Variety Distribution
- Release date: 1972

La colt era il suo Dio (internationally released as God Is My Colt .45) is a 1972 Italian Spaghetti Western directed by Luigi Batzella. In this film Batzella uses scenes of two Spaghetti Westerns he previously directed, Anche per Django le carogne hanno un prezzo and Paid in Blood.

== Cast ==
- Jeff Cameron as Captain Mike Jackson
- Krista Nell as Mary
- Donald O'Brien as Collins
- Gino Turini as James Klinger (as John Turner)
- Gianfranco Clerici as Manuel (as Mark Davis)
- Attilio Dottesio as Sheriff Bill Harris
