= Today We Kill... Tomorrow We Die! =

1968 film

- Italian re-release film poster emphasising the later popularity of Bud Spencer
- Directed by: Tonino Cervi
- Screenplay by: Dario Argento; Tonino Cervi
- Produced by: Tonino Cervi
- Starring: Brett Halsey; Bud Spencer; Wayde Preston; William Berger; Tatsuya Nakadai
- Cinematography: Sergio D'Offizi
- Edited by: Sergio Montanari
- Music by: Francesco Lavagnino
- Production companies: Produzioni Atlas Consorziate (P.A.C.); Splendida Film
- Distributed by: Produzioni Atlas Consorziate (P.A.C.)
- Release date: March 1968
- Running time: 95 minutes
- Country: Italy
- Language: Italian

Today We Kill... Tomorrow We Die! (Italian: Oggi a me... domani a te) also known as Today It's Me... Tomorrow You!, is a 1968 Spaghetti Western film. It is the directorial debut of Tonino Cervi, who co-wrote the film with Dario Argento.

== Plot ==
Wrongfully convicted Bill Kiowa spends his sentence planning revenge against the gang of Comancheros who murdered his wife and arranged for his blame. Upon his release he hires four specialist killers for his vengeance.

== Cast ==
- Brett Halsey as Bill Kiowa (credited as Montgomery Ford)
- Bud Spencer as O'Bannion
- Wayde Preston as Jeff Milton
- William Berger as Francis "Colt" Moran
- Tatsuya Nakadai as James Elfego
- Jeff Cameron as Moreno
- Stanley Gordon as Bunny Fox
- Diana Madigan as Mirana Kiowa
- Doro Corra' as Gun Seller
- Aldo Marianecci as Peter, the Barber
- Michele Borelli as Sheriff Bannister
- Umberto Di Grazia as Elfego's Henchman
- Franco Pechini as Prison Warden

== Release ==
Today We Kill...Tomorrow We Die! was released in March 1968.

== Bibliography ==
- Poppi, Roberto; Pecorari, Mario. Dizionario del cinema italiano. I film. Rom: Gremese Editore, 2007. ISBN 8884405033.
- Giusti, Marco (2007). Dizionario del western all'italiana. Milan: Mondadori, 2007. ISBN 978-8804572770.
- Hughes, Howard (2010). Spaghetti Westerns. Harpenden: Kamera Books. ISBN 978-1-84243-303-4.
