= Paid in Blood =

- Directed by: Luigi Batzella
- Starring: Krista Nell; Jeff Cameron
- Release date: 1971
- Country: Italy
- Language: Italian

Paid in Blood is a 1971 Spaghetti Western directed by Luigi Batzella.

The original Italian title of the film was Quelle Sporche Anime Dannate.

== Plot ==
Tom Carter's brother is robbed and murdered after withdrawing all his money out of the bank to Wed Cora, a saloon girl. Cora helps Tom unmask the real killer, a sinister town boss trying to swindle a prospector's family out of their farm.
