= Jeff Cameron =

Italian actor (1932–1985)

- Born: April 11th, 1932
- Died: 1985 (aged 52–53)
- Occupation: Actor
- Years active: 1962–1973

Jeff Cameron (born Goffredo Scarciofolo; April 11, 1932 – 1985) was an Italian actor. He appeared in more than thirty films from 1962 to 1973.

== Filmography ==
Year	Title	Role	Notes
1962	Colossus of the Arena	Gladiator	Uncredited
1963	I Am Semiramis	Desenio Darak - Sumerian Fighter	Uncredited
1963	Goliath and the Sins of Babylon	Gladiator	Uncredited
1963	Hercules vs. Moloch	Gladiator	
1964	Gladiators Seven	Gladiator	Uncredited
1964	Triumph of the Ten Gladiators	Fario	
1964	Spartacus and the Ten Gladiators	Gladiator	
1964	Hercules and the Tyrants of Babylon	Soldier	
1964	Revenge of The Gladiators	Gladiator	Uncredited
1965	Challenge of the Gladiator	Gladiator	Uncredited
1965	Agent 3S3: Passport to Hell		
1965	Maciste, the Avenger of the Mayans	Manur Warrior	
1965	Blood for a Silver Dollar	Soldier	Uncredited
1965	Seven Rebel Gladiators		
1965	Adiós gringo	Townsman Cowboy with Rope	Uncredited
1966	Password: Kill Agent Gordon	Thug	Uncredited
1966	Arizona Colt	Rancher	Uncredited
1966	The Hills Run Red	Randall	
1966	Sugar Colt	Red	
1967	The Three Fantastic Supermen	La Squadra Acrobatica Italiana	
1967	Up the MacGregors!	Bandit	
1967	Death Trip	Basher in Bar	Uncredited
1967	Death Rides a Horse	Cavanaugh's Henchman	Uncredited
1967	Halleluja for Django	Mark	
1968	Prega Dio... e scavati la fossa!	Cipriano	
1968	Today We Kill, Tomorrow We Die!	Moreno	
1968	And Now... Make Your Peace with God	Sanders	
1968	Straniero... fatti il segno della croce!	Lucas Carson	
1969	Passa Sartana... è l'ombra della tua morte	Sartana	
1969	...e vennero in quattro per uccidere Sartana!	Sartana	
1971	A Barrel Full of Dollars	Mark Hamilton / The Nevada Kid	
1971	Anche per Django le carogne hanno un prezzo	Django	
1971	I giardini del diavolo	Lt. Bellings	
1971	Paid in Blood	Tom Carter	
1971	A Fistful of Death	Macho Callaghan	
1972	Beyond the Frontiers of Hate	Cervo Volante	
1972	God Is My Colt .45	Mike Jackson	
1972	Un Bounty killer a Trinità	Bounty Killer	
1973	La legge della Camorra	Mike Artesi	(final film role)
