= List of Italian films of 1971 =

A list of films produced in Italy in 1971 (see 1971 in film):

Italian films released in 1971
Title	Director	Cast	Genre	Notes
1870	Alfredo Giannetti	Anna Magnani, Marcello Mastroianni	drama	
A Barrel Full of Dollars	Demofilo Fidani	Hunt Powers, Gordon Mitchell, Ray Saunders	Western	
A come Andromeda	Vittorio Cottafavi	Luigi Vannucchi, Paola Pitagora	sci-fi	Television film
Un aller simple	José Giovanni	Jean-Claude Bouillon, Nicoletta, Maurice Garrel		French-Italian-Spanish co-production
Amuck!	Silvio Amadio	Farley Granger, Barbara Bouchet	Giallo	
And the Crows Will Dig Your Grave	Juan Bosch	Craig Hill, Ángel Aranda, Fernando Sancho	Western	Spanish–Italian co-production
Armiamoci e partite!	Nando Cicero	Franco and Ciccio, Martine Brochard	Comedy	
Les Assassins de l'ordre	Marcel Carné	Jacques Brel, Catherine Rouvel, Paola Pitagora		French-Italian co-production
Les Aveux les plus doux	Édouard Molinaro	Philippe Noiret, Roger Hanin, Caroline Cellier		French-Algerian-Italian co-production
Bad Man's River	Eugenio Martino	Lee Van Cleef, James Mason, Gina Lollobrigida	Western	Spanish–Italian–French co-production
The Ballad of Django	Demofilo Fidani	Hunt Powers, Gordon Mitchell, Dino Strano	Western	
Bandido malpelo	Giuseppe Maria Scotese	Eduardo Fajardo, George Garvell, Charo López	Western	Italian–Spanish co-production
Bastard, Go and Kill	Gino Mangini	George Eastman, Lincoln Tate, Franco Lantieri	Western	
A Bay of Blood	Mario Bava	Claudine Auger, Luigi Pistilli, Laura Betti	Thriller	
Between Miracles (Per grazia ricevuta)	Nino Manfredi	Nino Manfredi, Mariangela Melato	Comedy	Cannes award best first work. 2 Nastro d'Argento. Special David di Donatello
Black Belly of the Tarantula	Paolo Cavara	Giancarlo Giannini, Claudine Auger, Barbara Bouchet, Rossella Falk	Giallo	
Blackie the Pirate	Enzo Gicca	Terence Hill, Bud Spencer, George Martin	adventure-comedy	
Black Killer	Carlo Croccolo	Fred Robsahm, Klaus Kinski, Antonio Cantafora	Western	
Blindman	Ferdinando Baldi	Tony Anthony, Ringo Starr, Lloyd Battista	Western	Italian–American co-production
The Blonde in the Blue Movie	Steno	Lando Buzzanca, Pamela Tiffin	Comedy	
Brother Outlaw	Edoardo Mulargia	Luciano Stella, Jean Louis, Sophia Kammara	Western	
Bubù	Mauro Bolognini	Ottavia Piccolo, Massimo Ranieri, Gigi Proietti	Drama	
The Burglars	Henri Verneuil	Jean-Paul Belmondo, Omar Sharif, Dyan Cannon		French-Italian co-production
The Case Is Closed, Forget It	Damiano Damiani	Franco Nero, Riccardo Cucciolla, Turi Ferro	Crime-Drama	
The Case of the Scorpion's Tail	Sergio Martino	George Hilton, Anita Strindberg	Giallo	
The Cat o' Nine Tails	Dario Argento	James Franciscus, Karl Malden, Catherine Spaak	Giallo	Italian-French-West German co-production
Il clan dei due Borsalini	Giuseppe Orlandini	Franco and Ciccio	Comedy	
The Clowns	Federico Fellini	Federico Fellini, Alvaro Vitali,	Comedy	Made for TV
Cold Eyes of Fear	Enzo G. Castellari	Giovanna Ralli, Frank Wolff, Fernando Rey	—N/a	Italian-Spanish co-production
Comptes à rebours	Roger Pigaut	Michel Bouquet, Serge Reggiani, Jeanne Moreau		French-Italian co-production
Confessions of a Police Captain	Damiano Damiani	Franco Nero, Martin Balsam, Marilù Tolo	—N/a	
Cross Current	Tonino Ricci	Philippe Leroy, Elga Andersen	Giallo	
Dead Men Ride	Aldo Florio	Fabio Testi, Charo López, José Calvo	Western	Italian-Spanish co-production
Death in Venice (Morte a Venezia)	Luchino Visconti	Dirk Bogarde, Silvana Mangano, Björn Andrésen, Romolo Valli	Drama	Cannes Award. Gay interest. 4 BAFTA. 4 Nastro d'Argento.
Il Decameron	Pier Paolo Pasolini	Franco Citti, Ninetto Davoli, Pier Paolo Pasolini, Silvana Mangano	Erotic	Based on the novel Decamerone by Giovanni Boccaccio. First part of Pasolini's Trilogy of life, won prize at Berlin
The Deserter	Burt Kennedy	Ian Bannen, Richard Crenna	Western	
The Designated Victim	Maurizio Lucidi	Tomas Milian, Pierre Clémenti	Giallo	
Desert of Fire			Western	
The Devil Has Seven Faces	Osvaldo Civirani	Carroll Baker, Stephen Boyd, George Hilton	Giallo	
The Devil's Nightmare	Jean Brismée	Erika Blanc, Jean Servais	Horror	
Dig Your Grave Friend... Sabata's Coming	Juan Bosch	Richard Harrison, Fernando Sancho, Raf Baldassarre		Spanish–Italian co-production
Django's Cut Price Corpses	Luigi Batzella	Giovanni Scarciofolo, John Desmont, Esmeralda Barros	Western	
The Double	Romolo Guerrieri	Jean Sorel, Lucia Bosè, Ewa Aulin	Giallo	
Drummer of Vengeance	Mario Gariazzo	Ty Hardin, Craig Hill, Gordon Mitchell	Western	
Duck, You Sucker!	Sergio Leone	James Coburn, Rod Steiger, Romolo Valli	Western	
Durango is Coming, Pay or Die	Roberto Bianchi Montero	Brad Harris, Jose Torres, Gisela Hahn	Western	
I due assi del guantone	Mariano Laurenti	Franco and Ciccio	Comedy	
E le stelle stanno a guardare	Anton Giulio Majano	Orso Maria Guerrini, Giancarlo Giannini	drama	Television film
Erika	Filippo Walter Ratti	Patrizia Viotti, Pierre Brice, Bernhard De Vries	Erotic drama	
Er Più – storia d'amore e di coltello	Sergio Corbucci	Adriano Celentano, Claudia Mori, Vittorio Caprioli, Romolo Valli	comedy	
Eye of the Spider	Roberto Bianchi Montero	Klaus Kinski, Antonio Sabàto, Van Johnson	Film noir	
The Fifth Cord	Luigi Bazzoni	Franco Nero, Silvia Monti, Pamela Tiffin, Wolfgang Preiss	Giallo	
Finders Killers	Gianni Crea	Donal O'Brien, Gordon Mitchell, Pia Giancaro	Western	
A Fistful of Death	Demofilo Fidani	Hunt Powers, Klaus Kinski, Gordon Mitchell	Western	
Four Candles for My Colt	Ignacio F. Iquino	Robert Woods, Olga Román, Mariano Vidal	Western	Spanish–Italian co-production
Four Flies on Grey Velvet	Dario Argento	Michael Brandon, Mimsy Farmer, Jean-Pierre Marielle, Bud Spencer, Francine Racette	Giallo	
Four Pistols for Trinity	Giorgio Cristanllini	Peter Lee Lawrence, Ida Galli, Daniele Vargas	Western	
Gang War	Steno	Carlo Giuffrè, Pamela Tiffin, Vittorio De Sica, Aldo Fabrizi	criminal comedy	
Un gioco per Eveline	Marcello Avalone	Erna Shurer, Adriana Bogdan, Marco Guglielmi	—N/a	
A Girl in Australia	Luigi Zampa	Alberto Sordi, Claudia Cardinale, Riccardo Garrone	Comedy	David di Donatello best actress (Cardinale)
Goodbye Uncle Tom	Gualtiero Jacopetti, Franco Prosperi	Gualtiero Jacopetti	Mondo film	
Gunman of 100 Crosses	Carlo Croccolo	Luciano Stella, Ray Saunders, Marina Malfatti	Western	
Hands up, Dead Man! You're Under Arrest	—N/a	Peter Lee Lawrence, Espartaco Santoni, Helga Liné	Western	Spanish–Italian co-production
He Was Called Holy Ghost	Roberto Mauri	Vassili Karamesinis, Mimmo Palmara, Margaret Rose	Western	
Hey Amigo! A Toast to Your Death	Paolo Bianchini	Wayde Preston, Marco Zuanelli, Rik Battaglia	Western	
His Name Was King	—N/a	Richard Harrison, Klaus Kinski	Western	
Holy Water Joe	Mario Gariazzo	Ty Hardin, Lincoln Tate, Richard Harrison	Western	
The Iguana with the Tongue of Fire	Riccardo Freda	Luigi Pistilli, Dagmar Lassander, Anton Diffring, Valentina Cortese	Giallo	Italian–French–West German co-production
In the Name of the Italian People	Dino Risi	Ugo Tognazzi, Vittorio Gassman, Yvonne Furneaux	Comedy	
Io non spezzo... rompo	Bruno Corbucci	Alighiero Noschese, Enrico Montesano, Janet Ågren	Comedy	
Ivanhoe, the Norman Swordsman	Roberto Mauri	Mark Damon, Krista Nell	—N/a	Italian–French–Spanish co-production
Judge Roy Bean	Federico Chentrens, Jean Girault	Pierre Perret, Robert Hossein, Silva Monti	Western	Italian–French co-production
Kill Django... Kill First	Sergio Garrone	Giacomo Rossi Stuart, Aldo Sambrell, Diana Lorys	Western	Italian-Spanish co-production
Lady Frankenstein	Mel Welles	Joseph Cotten, Rosalba Neri	Horror	
Lady Liberty	Mario Monicelli	Sophia Loren, William Devane, Gigi Proietti, Danny DeVito	Comedy	
The Legend of Frenchie King	Christian-Jaque	Brigitte Bardot, Claudia Cardinale, Michael J. Pollard	Western	French–Italian–Spanish–British co-production
Let's Go and Kill Sartana	Mario Pinzauti	George Martin, Gordon Mitchell, Isarco Ravaioli	Western	
Liberation: Direction of the Main Blow	Yuri Ozerov	Nikolay Olyalin	war drama	Won the 1972 All-Union Film Festival Grand Prix.
Liberation: Battle of Berlin/ The Last Assault	Yuri Ozerov	Nikolay Olyalin	war drama	
The Life of Leonardo da Vinci	Renato Castellani	Philippe Leroy, Giampiero Albertini	Biographical	Television film
A Lizard in a Woman's Skin	Lucio Fulci	Florinda Bolkan, Stanley Baker, Jean Sorel	Giallo	
Lobo the Bastard	Demofilo Fidani	Peter Martell, Lincoln Tate, Daniela Giordano	Western	
Long Live Your Death	Duccio Tessari	Franco Nero, Eli Wallach, Lynn Redgrave	Western	Italian-Spanish-German co-production
Lover of the Great Bear	Valentino Orsini	Giuliano Gemma, Senta Berger	drama	
Lucky Johnny: Born in America	Jose Antonio Bolanos	Glen Lee, Virgil Frye, Venetia Vianello	Western	Mexican–Italian co-production
Ma che musica maestro	Mariano Laurenti	Gianni Nazzaro, Agostina Belli, Franco and Ciccio	Musicarello	
Max et les ferrailleurs	Claude Sautet	Michel Piccoli, Romy Schneider, Bernard Fresson		French-Italian co-production
Macédoine	Jacques Scandelari	Michèle Mercier, Bernard Fresson, Robert Webber	Comedy	Co-production with France
Man of the East	Enzo Barboni	Terence Hill, Gregory Walcott, Harry Carey Jr.	Spaghetti Western	
Man of the Year	Marco Vicario	Lando Buzzanca, Rossana Podestà, Luciano Salce, Sylva Koscina, Bernard Blier	Sex comedy	
The Man with Icy Eyes	Alberto De Martino	Antonio Sabàto, Barbara Bouchet, Faith Domergue, Victor Buono	Giallo	
Million Dollar Eel	Salvatore Samperi	Ottavia Piccolo, Lino Toffolo, Mario Adorf, Senta Berger	Comedy	
La morte cammina con i tacchi alti	Luciano Ercoli	Frank Wolff, Susan Scott	Giallo	
The Most Gentle Confessions	Édouard Molinaro	Philippe Noiret, Roger Hanin, Caroline Cellier	Crime	Co-production with Algeria and France
My Name is Mallory	Mario Moroni	Robert Woods, Gabriella Giorgelli, Teodoro Corra	Western	
My Name Is Rocco Papaleo	Ettore Scola	Marcello Mastroianni, Lauren Hutton	Comedy	
The Night Evelyn Came Out of the Grave	Emilio Miraglia	Anthony Steffen, Marina Malfatti, Erika Blanc	Giallo	
The Night of the Damned	Filippo Walter Ratti	Pierre Brice, Patrizia Viotti, Angela de Leo	Horror	
Nights and Loves of Don Juan	Alfonso Brescia	Robert Hoffman, Barbara Bouchet, Ira von Furstenburg	—N/a	Italian-Spanish co-production
Oasis of Fear	Umberto Lenzi	Irene Papas, Ornella Muti	Giallo	
On the Point of Death	Mario Garriba	Fabio Garriba	drama	
Paid in Blood	Luigi Batzella	Giovanni Scarciofolo, Donal O'Brien, Alfredo Rizzo	Western	
Panhandle 38	Toni Secchi	Scott Holden, Keenan Wynn, Delia Boccardo	Spaghetti Western	
La Part des lions	Jean Larriaga	Robert Hossein, Charles Aznavour, Michel Constantin		French-Italian co-production
Popsy Pop	Jean Herman	Claudia Cardinale, Stanley Baker, Henri Charrière		
The Price of Death	Enzo Gicca Palli	Gianni Garko, Klaus Kinski, Gely Genka	Western	
The Priest's Wife	Dino Risi	Sophia Loren, Marcello Mastroianni	Comedy	
In Prison Awaiting Trial	Nanni Loy	Alberto Sordi, Elga Andersen, Lino Banfi	Prison drama	Berlin Award & David di Donatello for best actor (Sordi)
Il Prof. Dott. Guido Tersilli, primario della clinica Villa Celeste, convenzionata con le mutue	Luciano Salce	Alberto Sordi, Ida Galli, Pupella Maggio, Princess Ira von Fürstenberg, Claudio Gora	Comedy	sequel of Be Sick... It's Free
Red Sun	Terence Young	Charles Bronson, Ursula Andress, Toshirô Mifune	Western	French-Italian-Spanish co-production
Return of Sabata	Gianfranco Parolini	Lee Van Cleef, Reiner Schöne, Giamppiero Albertini	Western	Italian-French-German co-production
Roma Bene	Carlo Lizzani	Nino Manfredi, Virna Lisi, Senta Berger, Michèle Mercier, Irene Papas	Giallo-Comedy	
Sacco e Vanzetti	Giuliano Montaldo	Gian Maria Volonté, Riccardo Cucciolla, Rosanna Fratello, Cyril Cusack	Docudrama	Based on the Sacco and Vanzetti trial. Cannes Award for best actor (Cucciolla). 3 Nastro d'Argento
La Saignée	Claude Mulot	Bruno Pradal, Charles Southwood, Gabriele Tinti		French-Italian co-production
Le Saut de l'ange	Yves Boisset	Jean Yanne, Senta Berger, Sterling Hayden		French-Italian co-production
Savage Guns	Demofilo Fidani	Robert Woods, Gordon Mitchell	Western	
Scipio the African	Luigi Magni	Marcello Mastroianni, Silvana Mangano, Vittorio Gassman	Comedy	
A Season in Hell	Nelo Risi	Terence Stamp, Jean-Claude Brialy, Florinda Bolkan	Drama	
Secret Fantasy (Il merlo maschio)	Pasquale Festa Campanile	Laura Antonelli, Lando Buzzanca, Ferruccio De Ceresa	Comedy	
Il sesso del diavolo - Trittico	Oscar Brazzi	Rossano Brazzi, Sylva Coscina, Maitena Galli	—N/a	
The Sheriff of Rocksprings	Mario Sabatini	Richard Harrison, Cosetta Greco, Donal O'Brien	Western	
Shoot the Living and Pray for the Dead	Giuseppe Vari	Klaus Kinski, Victoria Zinny, Paolo Casella	Western	
Short Night of Glass Dolls	Aldo Lado	Ingrid Thulin, Jean Sorel, Mario Adorf, Barbara Bach	Giallo	
Slaughter Hotel	Fernando Di Leo	Klaus Kinski, Margaret Lee	horror	
Socrates	Roberto Rossellini	Jean Sylvère	Drama	
Something Creeping in The Dark	Mario Colucci	Farley Granger, Lucia Bosè	Horror	
Stanza 17-17 palazzo delle tasse, ufficio imposte	Michele Lupo	Gastone Moschin, Philippe Leroy, Lionel Stander, Franco Fabrizi, Ugo Tognazzi	Heist comedy	
La supertestimone	Franco Giraldi	Ugo Tognazzi, Monica Vitti	Comedy	
Tara Poki	Amasi Damiani	Meno Reitano, Aliza Adar, Ignazio Spalla	Western	
Terrible Day of the Big Gundown	Sergio Garrone	George Eastman, Ty Hardin	Spaghetti Western	
That's How We Women Are	Dino Risi	Monica Vitti, Carlo Giuffrè, Enrico Maria Salerno	Comedy	
They Call Him Cemetery	Giuliano Carnimeo	Gianni Garko, William Berger, Christopher Chittell	Western	
They Call Me Hallelujah	Giuliano Carnimeo	George Hilton, Charles Southwood	Western	
They've Changed Their Faces	Corrado Farina	Adolfo Celi, Geraldine Hooper, Giuliano Disperati	—N/a	
Thirteenth is a Judas	Giuseppe Vari	Donal O'Brien, Maurice Poli, Dino Strano	Western	
This Kind of Love	Alberto Bevilacqua	Jean Seberg, Ugo Tognazzi, Ewa Aulin, Angelo Infanti	romance-drama	David di Donatello Best Film winner
'Tis Pity She's a Whore	Giuseppe Patroni Griffi	Charlotte Rampling, Oliver Tobias, Fabio Testi	Drama	Based on 'Tis Pity She's a Whore by John Ford (dramatist)
Trafic	Jacques Tati	Jacques Tati	Comedy	
Trastevere	Fausto Tozzi	Nino Manfredi, Rosanna Schiaffino, Vittorio Caprioli, Ottavia Piccolo, Vittorio De Sica	Comedy	
Trinity Is Still My Name	Enzo Barboni	Terence Hill, Bud Spencer, Harry Carey Jr.	Western	
La vacanza	Tinto Brass	Vanessa Redgrave, Franco Nero, Corin Redgrave	drama	
Vendetta at Dawn	Sergio Garrone	George Eastman, Ty Hardin, Bruno Corazzari	Western	
Vengeance Is a Dish Served Cold	Pasquale Squitieri	Leonard Mann, Ivan Rassimov, Klaus Kinski	Spaghetti Western	
Vengeance Trail	Pasquale Squitieri	Leonard Mann, Ivan Rassimov, Klaus Kinski	Western	
W Django!	Edoardo Mulargia	Anthony Steffen, Stelio Candelli	Western	
We Are All in Temporary Liberty	Manlio Scarpelli	Riccardo Cucciolla, Philippe Noiret, Macha Méril, Lionel Stander, Vittorio De Sica	crime drama	
Web of the Spider	Antonio Margheriti	Anthony Franciosa, Michèle Mercier, Klaus Kinski	Horror	Italian–French–West German co-production
When Men Carried Clubs and Women Played Ding-Dong	Bruno Corbucci	Antonio Sabato, Aldo Giuffrè, Vittorio Caprioli, Nadia Cassini	comedy	
Without Apparent Motive	Philippe Labro	Jean-Louis Trintignant, Dominique Sanda, Sacha Distel		French-Italian co-production
The Working Class Goes to Heaven (La classe operaia va in paradiso)	Elio Petri	Gian Maria Volonté, Mariangela Melato, Gino Pernice, Luigi Diberti	Political drama	Palme d'Or winner. David di Donatello winner
Zorro, Rider of Vengeance	José Luis Merino	Carlos Quincey, Malisa Longo, María Mahor	Western	Spanish–Italian co-production
Zorro, the Mask of vengeance	José Luis Merino	Carlos Quiney, Lea Nanni, Mariano Vidal Molina	Western	Spanish–Italian co-production
