= Amerigo Castrighella =

Italian actor (1926-1989)

Amerigo Castrichella (15 July 1926 – 29 October 1989) was an Italian actor. He played 2nd Sombrero Onlooker at Tuco's 1st Hanging in The Good, the Bad and the Ugly (1966), and the executioner in Mark of Zorro (1975). He also appeared in Anything for a Friend (1973), and And They Smelled the Strange, Exciting, Dangerous Scent of Dollars (1973). Castrighella died in Rome on 29 October 1989, at the age of 63.

== Filmography ==
- The Masked Man Against the Pirates (1964) as Prigionero
- 3 colpi di Winchester per Ringo (1966) as Daniels henchman (uncredited)
- Ringo and His Golden Pistol (1966) as Perez Henchman (uncredited)
- Massacre Time (1966) as Scott Henchman (uncredited)
- Uno sceriffo tutto d'oro (1966) as Vargas henchman (uncredited)
- The Good, the Bad and the Ugly (1966) as 2nd Sombrero Onlooker at Tuco's 1st Hanging (uncredited)
- 7 donne per i Mac Gregor (1967) as Yellowstone Man with List of Supplies (uncredited)
- The Big Gundown (1967) as Don Gomez Serrano henchman (uncredited)
- Requiescant (1967) as Price Brother (uncredited)
- Cjamango (1967) as El Tigre henchman (uncredited)
- The Last Killer (1967) as Barrett henchman (uncredited)
- The Stranger Returns (1967) as En Plein Henchman at Water Trough
- Death Rides a Horse (1967) as Cavanaugh's Henchman (uncredited)
- Death Rides Along (1967) as Talbot Man at Election Counting (uncredited)
- Non aspettare Django, spara (1967) as Barrett (uncredited)
- A Hole in the Forehead (1968) as Munguya Henchman (uncredited)
- O tutto o niente (1968) as Buseba henchman (uncredited)
- Straniero... fatti il segno della croce! (1968) as Texas - Donovan Gang Member
- May God Forgive You... But I Won't (1968) as Dick Smart henchman (uncredited)
- Ed ora... raccomanda l'anima a Dio! (1968) as John H. Corbett
- A Sky Full of Stars for a Roof (1968) as Pratt's henchman
- ...e venne il tempo di uccidere (1968) as Mulligan Henchman (uncredited)
- Passa Sartana... è l'ombra della tua morte (1969) as Randall henchman (uncredited)
- ...e vennero in quattro per uccidere Sartana! (1969) as Pete
- Quintana (1969) as Soldier (uncredited)
- Django and Sartana Are Coming... It's the End (1970) as Deputy Sheriff
- Dead Men Don't Make Shadows (1970) as Medina henchman
- A Barrel Full of Dollars (1971) as Wells
- Giù le mani... carogna! (1971) as Saloon Customer (uncredited)
- Savage Guns (1971) as Sturges
- Il suo nome era Pot (1971) as Steve henchman (uncredited)
- A Fistful of Death (1971) as Lukas
- Posate le pistole, reverendo (1971) as Albert
- Go Away! Trinity Has Arrived in Eldorado (1972) as Ringo
- Un bounty killer a Trinità (1972) as Sancho henchman
- Allegri becchini... arriva Trinità (1972) as Cain
- Una colt in mano al diavolo (1973) as Poker player in saloon (uncredited)
- Amico mio... frega tu che frego io (1973) as Tom
- La legge della Camorra (1973) as Vincenzo
- Mark of Zorro (1975) as Executioner
- L'educanda (1975) as Merchant (final film role)
