= Pulcrano =

Pulcrano is a surname. Notable people with the surname include:

- Dan Pulcrano (born c.1959), American journalist, publisher, newspaper owner, and Web executive
- Enzo Pulcrano (1943–1992), Italian actor and writer
