= Dead Men Don't Make Shadows =

1970 film

- Directed by: Demofilo Fidani (as Miles Deem)
- Written by: Demofilo Fidani; Franco Mannocchi
- Produced by: Demofilo Fidani
- Starring: Jack Betts (as Hunt Powers)
- Cinematography: Joe D'Amato Technicolor, Techniscope
- Edited by: Piera Bruni
- Music by: Coriolano Gori (as Lallo Gori)
- Release date: 1970
- Running time: 83 minutes
- Country: Italy
- Language: Italian

Dead Men Don't Make Shadows, aka Stranger That Kneels Beside the Shadow of a Corpse (Italian: Inginocchiati straniero... I cadaveri non fanno ombra!) is a 1970 Spaghetti Western directed by Demofilo Fidani.

== Story ==
A bounty hunter finds himself caught between an outlaw and an evil mine owner.

== Cast ==
- Jack Betts as Hunt Powers – Lazar Peacock/Sabata/Sartana
- Franco Borelli as Chet Davis – Blonde/Stranger
- Gordon Mitchell – Roger Murdock
- Ettore Manni – Barrett/Billy Ring
- Benito Pacifico as Dennis Colt – Medina
- Simonetta Vitelli as Simone Blondell – Maya
- Custer Gail – Medina Henchman
- Mila Vitelli Valenza as Mary Ross – Jole
- Pietro Fumelli - Ted Stanley
- Attilio Dottesio as Dean Reese – Sanchez
- Manlio Salvatori - The 1st Sheriff
- Eugenio Galadini - Tom, The Storekeeper
- Mario Capuccio - The Mine Worker
- Giglio Gigli - Medina Henchman
- Aristide Massaccesi as Arizona Massachusetts - Cinematographer

== Releases ==
Wild East released a limited edition R0 NTSC DVD double feature with One Damned Day at Dawn...Django Meets Sartana!.
