= Enzo Pulcrano =

Italian actor and screenwriter

Vincenzo Pulcrano
- Born: 31 May 1943; Acerra, Campania, Italy
- Died: 28 February 1992 (aged 48)
- Occupation: actor

Enzo Pulcrano (born 31 May 1943 in Acerra, Italy, near Naples; died 28 February 1992) was an Italian actor and writer active in the 1970s and known for Rulers of the City (1976), La Banda Vallanzasca (1977) and A Pugni Nudi (1974), in which he received a writing credit. He was born on 31 May 1943 in Acerra, Italy, near Naples.

== Biography ==
After his 1971 debut in director Demofilo Fidani’s A Fistful of Death, Pulcrano appeared in several mostly low-budget spaghetti Westerns and comedies. With the crime genre’s popularity, he was a recurring presence in poliziotteschi, including Fernando di Leo’s Rulers of the City (1976) and Mario Bianchi's La banda Vallanzasca (1977), in which he had the lead role.

He played Salvatore Trapanese in the 1976 comedy Hit Squad.

== Death ==
Pulcrano died in 1992. According to Mario Bianchi, who directed him in La Banda Vallanzasca, Pulcrano had developed a serious drug addiction.

== Filmography ==
- Giù le mani... carogna! (Django Story), directed by Demofilo Fidani (1970)
- Il Magnifico West, directed by Gianni Crea (1971)
- Giù la testa... hombre!, directed by Demofilo Fidani (1971)
- Rimase uno solo e fu la morte per tutti! (1971)
- Black Killer, directed by Carlo Croccolo (1971)
- I racconti di Canterbury N. 2, directed by Lucio Dandolo (1972)
- Decameron n° 2 - Le altre novelle del Boccaccio, directed by Mino Guerrini (1972)
- Decameron n° 4 - Le belle novelle del Boccaccio, directed by Paolo Bianchini (1972)
- A.A.A. Massaggiatrice bella presenza offresi..., directed by Demofilo Fidani (1972)
- Go Away! Trinity Has Arrived in Eldorado, directed by Joe D'Amato (1972)
- Un Bounty killer a Trinità (1972)
- Le favolose notti d'oriente (1973)
- Mafia Killer (1973)
- Amico mio, frega tu... che frego io! (1973)
- Novelle licenziose di vergini vogliose, directed by Joe D'Amato (1973)
- La Mafia mi fa un baffo, directed by Riccardo Garrone (1974)
- A pugni nudi, regia di Marcello Zeani (1974)
- Quant'è bella la Bernarda, tutta nera, tutta calda, directed by Lucio Dandolo (1975)
- La commessa (1975)
- La Bolognese, directed by Alfredo Rizzo (1975)
- Kidnap Syndicate (1975)
- Live Like a Cop, Die Like a Man (1976)
- Hit Squad (1976)
- Mister Scarface (1976)
- La banda Vallanzasca (1977)
- Little Italy (1977)
- Assassinio sul Tevere (1979)
- Cameriera senza malizia (1980)
- Ricomincio da zero (1982)
