= My Name Is Pecos =

1966 film

My Name is Pecos
- Italian film poster
- Directed by: Maurizio Lucidi
- Screenplay by: Adriano Bolzoni
- Produced by: Franco Palombi; Gabriele Silvestri
- Starring: Robert Woods; Peter Carsten; Lucia Modugno; Norman Clark; Cristina Iosani; Massimo Righi
- Cinematography: Franco Villa
- Edited by: Anna Amedei
- Music by: Lallo Gori
- Production company: Italcine T.V.
- Distributed by: Atlantis Film
- Release date: December 1966 (Italy)
- Running time: 83 minutes
- Country: Italy

My Name Is Pecos (Italian: Due once di piombo (Il mio nome è Pecos)) is a 1966 Italian Spaghetti Western film directed by Maurizio Lucidi. It was followed by Pecos Cleans Up the next year.

== Plot ==
As a child, Pecos Martinez witnessed how Joe Clane had Pecos' family wiped out. By now Pecos is a grown man who's out for revenge, but Clane has a whole city under his sway. All too soon Pecos is made and Clane's henchmen are just too many. Once he's trapped and captured, he needs to conceive a striking ruse if he wants to live.

== Cast ==
- Robert Woods as Pecos Martinez
- Pier Paolo Capponi as Joe Clane
- Lucia Modugno as Mary Burton
- Peter Carsten as Steve
- Luigi Casellano as Eddie
- Cristina Iosani as Nina
- Corrine Fontaine as Lola
- Giuliano Raffaelli as Dr. Burton
- Umberto Raho as Morton
- Maurizio Bonuglia as Ned
- Massimo Righi as Jack

== Release ==
My Name Is Pecos was released in Italy in December 1966 as Due once di piombo (Il mio nome è Pecos). The film was the first spaghetti western that started the trend of films with titles containing the phrase My Name is... or They Call Me..., which followed with such films as They Call Me Trinity or My Name is Nobody. The film was released outside Italy, including the United Kingdom in 1968 by Golden Era Films where it was cut to receive an X-rating. It was also released in West Germany in 1967, where Woods' character was renamed Jonny Madoc, which became the film's title. My Name Is Pecos was successful enough in Italy to receive a sequel, released in March 1967, titled Pecos Cleans Up.

Arrow Video released the film alongside Massacre Time, Bandidos and And God Said to Cain as part of their Blu-ray box set Vengeance Trails: Four Classic Westerns on July 27, 2021.
