= Savage Guns =

Savage Guns may refer to:

- Savage Guns (1971 film), a 1971 spaghetti western directed by Demofilo Fidani
- Savage Guns (1961 film), a 1961 Eurowestern film
