= Go Away! Trinity Has Arrived in Eldorado =

- Directed by: Joe D'Amato
- Written by: Romano Scandariato; Diego Spataro
- Starring: Stelvio Rosi; Gordon Mitchell; Daniela Giordano; Amerigo Castrighella; Carla Mancini; Craig Hill
- Cinematography: Joe D'Amato
- Edited by: Gianfranco Simoncelli
- Music by: Giancarlo Chiaramello
- Release date: November 12, 1972
- Running time: 87 minutes
- Country: Italy
- Language: Italian

Go Away! Trinity Has Arrived in Eldorado (Italian: Scansati ... a Trinità arriva Eldorado, lit. 'Back off ... Eldorado arrives in Trinity') is a comedic Spaghetti Western from 1972. It is one of the first of various "Trinity" films inspired by the earlier They Call Me Trinity and Trinity Is Still My Name.

== Plot and title ==
Jonathan Duke, a con man, and his partner Sebastian Carter make a living travelling the country and selling a dubious "Elixir of Long Life" - a scheme that is in the end exposed by an elderly man. Next, the two try to trick people at poker, but the plan ends badly in a saloon brawl.

After these two introductory scenes, the main plot of the film starts. Duke and Carter plan to team up with Ringo Jones and his band to rob the crazy Mexican general Eldorado, who believes he is a god and sits on a golden throne flanked by two servant girls, of his gold treasure. Duke does so successfully by dazzling Eldorado with magic tricks, then overcoming him in a fencing duel and tying him up.

The film's English title notwithstanding, "Trinity" is the name of a town, not a person, and the Italian title more accurately reflects the film's plot.

== Cast ==
- Stan Cooper as Sebastian Carter
- Gordon Mitchell as Jonathan Duke III
- Craig Hill as Eldorado
- Custer Gail as Ringo Jones
- Daniela Giordano as Juanita
- Luciano Conti
- Carla Mancini
- Anthony G. Stanton
- Anna Lina Alberti as Pussy
- Paul Crain
- Dennis Colt
- Xiro Papas as Wedding guest
- Erika Blanc as Ragazza messicana alla festa

== Production ==
The film was shot at Gordon Mitchell's western village at Manziana.

As to the length of the shoot, D'Amato gives two conflicting statements: In an interview published in print in 1996, D'Amato recalled it had lasted six days, whereas in a video interview conducted in 1998, he said it had taken three days. Diego Spataro, however, stated to "Nocturno" that it had lasted four and a half days. Spataro also remembered the anecdote that as soon as shooting had closed, D'Amato had said, "Tell the cook to throw in the spaghetti" (Italian: "Avverti la cuoca di buttare gli spaghetti").

== Directorial credit ==
Sources disagree as to the identity of the film's director. The credited name, Dick Spitfire, is a pseudonym for Diego Spataro, a name that had also been used for an earlier film, Django and Sartana Are Coming... It's the End.

In his 1992 book on Spaghetti Westerns, Thomas Weisser assumes that the name is a pseudonym for director Demofilo Fidani and, consequently, states that Fidani was director for both Django and Go Away! However, Weisser cites no additional evidence other than the similarity of the two films' treatment of humor with that seen in other Fidani films.

In an interview published in 1996, Joe D'Amato said that Go Away! was the first film he directed and that he shot it in six days with the help of assistant director Romano Gastaldi. He also acknowledged that the official director's credit went to Spataro, and not to him. In another interview some two years later, D'Amato elaborated on this point, stating that he had not wanted to receive directorial credit because he had feared that, once he had worked as a director, other directors would have been hesitant to hire him as a cinematographer. D'Amato further recalled that Spataro, who had made many Spaghetti Westerns with Fidani, had plenty of stock footage from those films, and that some of it was used in editing Go Away!.

In his 1999 book on Italian cult films, Marco Giusti cites an interview with Diego Spataro in which Spataro recalled that D'Amato initially had wanted him to act as a puppet (Italian: "pupazzo"): D'Amato would give him the information he was then to pass on the actors so they would know in which way to act; after 10 minutes, however, D'Amato became aware of the absurdity of the situation and took charge himself. Giusti therefore attributes the direction of the film to D'Amato, and states that Fidani, for whom D'Amato had often worked as a camera operator, was involved as a producer.

In his book on Spaghetti Westerns published in 2002, film historian Ulrich Bruckner describes Go Away! as a collaboration between Spataro, Fidani and D'Amato. He credits all three as directors of the film.

== The motorbike gag ==
One of the film's comic effects is Eldorado's horse, which has motorbike mirrors attached to it. When Eldorado arrives at an oat vendor, he asks him to "fill it up with super" (Italian: "Fammi il pieno di super!").

== Reception ==
In a contemporaneous review of the film, La Révue du Cinéma deplored mistakes in chronology, chaotic editing and lack of talent in storytelling, but at the same time recognized its quirky humour. More recently (2002), Ulrich Bruckner found it to be among the better collaborations of D'Amato, Fidani and Spataro. In his 2004 book on Joe D'Amato, Gordiano Lupi thinks that Go Away!, in contrast to the western A Bounty Killer in Trinity which D'Amato is also said to have directed, contains ingenious ideas that to Lupi are the hallmark of D'Amato's involvement. Lupi thinks that the film's best moments are its comic or "trashy" scenes, whereas he criticizes what he calls the "structural" parts: lengthy chases, laborious ambushes, endless, predictable shootouts and unrealistic brawls. To Lupi, the film is discontinuous and "loses itself" towards the end when it seems the director did not known where he wanted to end up. Still, Lupi applauds the last scene in which the Duke puts a hand of five aces on the table, calling it - in the Italian version - a "superpokermaggiore" (translated: "a major superpoker").

== See also ==
- List of Spaghetti Western films
