= Aysanoa Runachagua =

Aysanoa Runachagua is a film actor.

He appeared along Tchang Yu, Tom Felleghi and Franco Morici in Massacre Time (1966), by Lucio Fulci. He played Pistolero Recruited by Tuco in the Cave in Il buono il bruto il cattivo (1966), by Sergio Leone; and Mexican hired gun in The Stranger Returns (1967), by Luigi Vanzi.

== Filmography ==
- Blood at Sundown (1965) as Mexican tracker in cantina
- The Brute and the Beast (1966) as Sonko
- The Good, the Bad and the Ugly (1966) as Pistolero Recruited by Tuco in the Cave (uncredited)
- Cisco (1966)
- A Bullet for the General (1967) as Paymaster (uncredited)
- Payment in Blood (1967) as Rios
- Killer Caliber .32 (1967) as Freeman Henchman (uncredited)
- Cjamango (1967) as Guitar Player (uncredited)
- The Stranger Returns (1967) as Mexican Husband
- Bandidos (1967) as Mexican with Mustache Held Like a Slave by Vigonza (uncredited)
- Go for Broke (1968) as Barber (uncredited)
- Today We Kill, Tomorrow We Die! (1968) as Comanchero (uncredited)
- Long Days of Hate (1968) as Indian (uncredited)
- Vengeance (1968) as Choctaw / Sonko, Kid's Henchman (uncredited)
- May God Forgive You... But I Won't (1968) as Dick Smart henchman (uncredited)
- Wrath of God (1968) as Killer (uncredited)
- Tepepa (1969) as Vicente (uncredited)
- Light the Fuse... Sartana Is Coming (1970) as Moko Henchman (uncredited)
