= Black Jack (1968 film) =

1968 film

- Directed by: Gianfranco Baldanello
- Written by: Luigi Ambrosini; Gianfranco Baldanello; Augusto Finocchi; Mario Maffei
- Produced by: Fernando Franchi
- Starring: Robert Woods
- Cinematography: Mario Fioretti
- Edited by: Mario Gargiulo
- Music by: Lallo Gori
- Release date: 1968
- Country: Italy

Black Jack (Italian: Black Jack - Un uomo per 5 vendette) is a 1968 Italian-Israeli Spaghetti Western film co-written and directed by Gianfranco Baldanello and starring Robert Woods.

== Cast ==
- Robert Woods as Jack Murphy aka 'Black Jack'
- Lucienne Bridou as Susan
- Rik Battaglia as Skinner
- Mimmo Palmara as Indian Joe
- Nino Fuscagni as Peter
- Larry Dolgin as Reb
- Federico Chentrens as Gordon
- Dalia Lahav as Julie Skinner

== Production ==
The film was shot back to back with Domenico Paolella's Execution, with whom it shares the producers, the actors Mimmo Palmara and Dalia Lahav, and the composer Lallo Gori. It was mainly shot at the Desert Studios in Israel, with some parts filmed in Rome, in Cinecittà, Elios Studios and Ostia Antica.

== Reception ==
Italian film critic Marco Giusti described the film as "very strange, very violent and very dark, [...] shot in a very modern, fast-paced way, [...] excellent, full of inventive". According to critic Alberto Pezzotta, it is a well-made film that has as its only flaw the "alternation of too many registers", that "especially takes a big risk with its melodramatic ending".
