= A Barrel Full of Dollars =

1971 film

- Italian: Per una bara piena di dollari
- Directed by: Demofilo Fidani
- Written by: Demofilo Fidani; Tonino Ricci
- Produced by: Massimo Bernardi; Diego Spataro
- Starring: Jack Betts
- Cinematography: Joe D'Amato
- Edited by: Piera Bruni
- Music by: Lallo Gori
- Release date: 1 April 1971
- Running time: 91 minutes
- Country: Italy
- Language: Italian

A Barrel Full of Dollars also known as Coffin Full of Dollars (Italian: Per una bara piena di dollari) is a 1971 Italian Western film directed by Demofilo Fidani and starring Jack Betts.

== Cast ==
- Hunt Powers – Tamayo
- Gordon Mitchell – John
- Ray Saunders – Sam
- Simone Blondel – Monica Benson
- Dennis Colt – Ramirez
- Dean Reese – Charles Benson
- Klaus Kinski – Hagen
- Jeff Cameron – George 'Nevada Kid' Hamilton
- Lorenzo Arbore – Sheriff
- Lucky McMurray
- Custer Gail
