= The Last Killer =

- Wild East DVD cover
- Directed by: Giuseppe Vari
- Written by: Augusto Caminito
- Produced by: Sergio Garrone
- Starring: George Eastman; Anthony Ghidra
- Cinematography: Angelo Filippini
- Edited by: Giuseppe Vari
- Music by: Roberto Pregadio
- Release date: 1967
- Running time: 88 min
- Country: Italy
- Language: Italian

The Last Killer (Italian: L'ultimo killer, also known as Django the Last Killer) is a 1967 Spaghetti Western movie starring George Eastman and Anthony Ghidra.

== Plot ==
Ramon's father has a small farm and, like all the other poor farmers nearby, he owes money to a rich rancher, landgrabber John Barrett. On his way to deliver money to Barrett, Ramon is ambushed, robbed and beaten unconscious, though he eventually reaches Barrett. While begging Barrett for more time, Ramon recognizes one of the robbers among Barrett's employees. He thinks that Barrett will help him now, but Barrett does not. Instead, Ramon is tortured until he can escape. Before he arrives home, his family is already dead, killed at Barrett's behest. Ramon, determined to exact revenge on Barrett, takes up training as a gunman.

== Cast ==
- George Eastman as Ramón / Chico
- Anthony Ghidra as Rezza / Rocco
- Dana Ghia as Molly, Saloon Owner
- Daniele Vargas as John Barrett
- Mirko Ellis as Stevens
- Gianni Medici as Bart / Burt
- John McDouglas as Il padre di Ramón
- Frank Fargas as Mack McRay
- Fred Coplan as "Slim"
- Valentino Macchi
- John Mathios
- Anton de Gortes
- Paul Real
- Max Fraser
- Remo Capitani as Barrett Henchman
- Giuseppe Castellano as Bearded Barrett's Man
- Amerigo Castrighella as Barrett Henchman
- Giulio Maculani as Sheriff

== Trivia ==
The title was changed to Django the Last Killer in some areas in order to capitalize on the success of the 1966 Franco Nero Spaghetti Western Django. However, The Last Killer is not a sequel.

== Releases ==
Wild East released the film as a limited-edition DVD under the title Django the Last Killer in a double feature with Hate Thy Neighbor. Both films are presented in their original aspect ratios.
