= A.A.A. Massaggiatrice bella presenza offresi... =

1972 film by Demofilo Fidani

- Directed by: Demofilo Fidani
- Screenplay by: Demofilo Fidani; Mila Vitelli
- Story by: Demofilo Fidani
- Starring: Paola Senatore
- Cinematography: Aldo Giordani
- Edited by: Piera Bruni
- Music by: Coriolano Gori
- Production company: Tarquinia Internazionale Cinematografica
- Release date: 1972
- Country: Italy
- Language: Italian

A.A.A. Massaggiatrice bella presenza offresi... (lit. 'A.A.A. Masseuse, Good-Looking, Offers Her Services...') is a 1972 Italian giallo film directed by Demofilo Fidani.

== Plot ==
Cristina is working as a call-girl. Her clients are mysteriously and brutally murdered one after another.

== Cast ==
- Paola Senatore as Cristina Graziani
- Simonetta Vitelli (credited as Simone Blondell) as Paola

== Production ==
The Italian film historian and critic Roberto Curti described A.A.A. Massaggiatrice bella presenza offresi... as being part of a minor wave of low-budget giallo films in second run and third-run venues.

The film"s script was written by director Demofilo Fidani and his wife Mila Vitelli. Unlike most of Fidani's films (predominantly Westerns) in which he is credited under an English alias, the director is credited by his (real) Italian name.

== Genre ==
The Italian database Cinematografo defines the film's subgenre as erotic thriller. The film contains elements of horror and slasher.

== Release ==
A.A.A. Massaggiatrice bella presenza offresi... was released in 1972. At the time of its release in France the same year, the film's version and its title (Caresses à domicile) were noted as "very daring", the film being presented as a mere "erotic film" by La Revue du cinéma or a "porn third-rate production" by Écran'

== Reception ==
From retrospective reviews, Roberto Curti described the film as containing elements of Demofilo Fidani's typical style, specifically Western-type revolvers and villains falling in slow motion in "unlikely acrobatic manners." Antonio Bruschini, of the Italian genre magazine Nocturno, found the ending of the film and the culprit predictable but noted that A.A.A. Massaggiatrice reflected the Argentinean atmosphere of the period.
