= Gatling Gun (film) =

1968 film

- Directed by: Paolo Bianchini
- Written by: José Luis Merino; Claudio Failoni; Franco Calderoni; Paolo Bianchini
- Produced by: Edmondo Amati
- Starring: Robert Woods
- Cinematography: Francisco Marín
- Music by: Piero Piccioni
- Release date: 1968
- Country: Italy
- Language: Italian

Gatling Gun (Italian: Quel caldo maledetto giorno di fuoco, Spanish: La ametralladora, also known as Damned Hot Day of Fire and Machine Gun Killers) is a 1968 Italian–Spanish spaghetti Western film directed by Paolo Bianchini and starring Robert Woods.

== Plot ==
In the waning days of the Civil War, Richard Gatling, creator of the gatling gun, offers his invention to the Federal Government. But Gatling is kidnapped by two assassins – under the employ of Tarpas. They also steal his new invention and kill three Union government agents. Soon after, the Pinkerton Agency sends out Cpt. Chris Tanner (himself a former secret service agent) to find Gatling and recover the weapon.

== Cast ==
- Robert Woods as Cpt. Chris Tanner
- John Ireland as Tarpas
- Ida Galli as Belinda Boyd
- Claudie Lange as Martha Simpson
- George Rigaud as Rykert
- Roberto Camardiel as Dr. Alan Curtis
- Gérard Herter as Mr. Bishop
- Furio Meniconi as Jeremiah Grant
- Tom Felleghy as Pinkerton
- Ennio Balbo as Richard Gatling
- Tiziano Cortini as Jonathan Wallace
- Rada Rassimov as Mrs. Treble
