= The Sinful Nuns of Saint Valentine =

1974 film by Sergio Grieco

- Theatrical release poster
- Italian: Le scomunicate di San Valentino
- Directed by: Sergio Grieco
- Written by: Sergio Grieco; Luigi Mordini
- Produced by: Gino Mordini
- Starring: Françoise Prévost; Jenny Tamburi; Paolo Malco; Franco Ressel; Gino Rocchetti; Bruna Beani; Dada Gallotti; Adriana Facchetti; Cinzia Greco; Eleonora Spinelli; Aldina Martano; Piero Anchisi; Calisto Calisti; Corrado Gaipa
- Cinematography: Emore Galeassi
- Edited by: Mario Gargiulo
- Music by: Lallo Gori
- Production company: Claudia Cinematografica
- Distributed by: Italian International Film
- Release date: 26 March 1974 (Italy)
- Running time: 93 minutes
- Country: Italy
- Language: Italian

The Sinful Nuns of Saint Valentine (Italian: Le scomunicate di San Valentino, lit. 'The Excommunication of Saint Valentine') is a 1974 Italian nunsploitation horror film co-written and directed by Sergio Grieco and starring Françoise Prévost and Jenny Tamburi.

== Synopsis ==
In the 16th century, two Spanish lovers are divided by the rivalry of their families. She then confines herself in a convent, and while the man searches for her, the abbess of the convent falls in love with him, hindering his research and carrying the girl to the Inquisition.

== Cast ==
- Françoise Prévost as The Abbess
- Jenny Tamburi as Lucita
- Paolo Malco as Esteban
- Franco Ressel as Don Alonso, Lucita's father
- Corrado Gaipa as Father Honorio de Mendoza
- Piero Anchisi as Isidro
- Aldina Martano as Sister Rosario
