= Pecos Cleans Up =

1967 film

- Directed by: Maurizio Lucidi
- Written by: Adriano Bolzoni; Augusto Caminito; Fernando Di Leo
- Cinematography: Franco Villa
- Edited by: Renzo Lucidi
- Music by: Lallo Gori
- Release date: 1967
- Country: Italy
- Language: Italian

Pecos è qui: prega e muori (internationally released as Pecos Cleans Up) is a 1967 Spaghetti Western film directed by Maurizio Lucidi.

The film is the immediate sequel of Due once di piombo; differently from the first chapter, it is more leaned towards comedy. It had significant commercial success in South-American markets.

== Cast ==
- Robert Woods: Pecos Martinez
- Erno Crisa: El Supremo
- Luciana Gilli: Dona Ramona
- Ignazio Spalla: Dago (as Pedro Sanchez)
- Piero Vida: Paco
- Umberto Raho: Pinto
