= Eleonora Duse (film) =

1947 Italian film

- Directed by: Filippo Walter Ratti
- Written by: Nino Bolla (novel); Giuseppe Berto; Adolfo Franci; Mario Serandrei; Filippo Walter Ratti
- Starring: Elisa Cegani; Rossano Brazzi; Andrea Checchi; Giovanni Grasso
- Cinematography: Rodolfo Lombardi
- Edited by: Mario Serandrei
- Production company: San Giorgio Film
- Distributed by: Artisti Associati
- Release date: 1947
- Running time: 90 minutes
- Country: Italy
- Language: Italian

Eleonora Duse is a 1947 Italian biographical film directed by Filippo Walter Ratti and starring Elisa Cegani, Rossano Brazzi and Andrea Checchi. It portrays the life of the celebrated Italian actress Eleonora Duse (1858–1924). The film was based on the novel La grande tragica by Nino Bolla.

== Cast ==
- Elisa Cegani as Eleonora Duse
- Rossano Brazzi as Arrigo Boito
- Andrea Checchi as Tebaldo Checchi
- Giovanni Grasso as impresario Schurman
- Manoel Roero as Martin Cafiero
- Fosca Freda as Nina
- Fedele Gentile as Rosaspina
- Alfredo Salvatori as Gabriele D'Annunzio
- Bruno Corelli
- Attilio Torelli
- Ingrid Hanussen

== See also ==
- Duse, a 2025 biographical film

== Bibliography ==
- Parrill, William. European Silent Films on Video: a Critical Guide. McFarland & Co., 2007.
