= A Stranger in Paso Bravo =

1968 film

- Directed by: Salvatore Rosso
- Written by: Lucio Battistrada; Fernando Morandi; Eduardo Manzanos Brochero
- Produced by: Francesco Carnicelli; Arturo Marcos
- Cinematography: Alfonso Nieva; Gino Santini
- Music by: Angelo Francesco Lavagnino
- Release date: 1968
- Running time: 97 minutes
- Country: Italy
- Language: Italian

A Stranger in Paso Bravo (Italian: Uno straniero a Paso Bravo, Spanish: Los pistoleros de Paso Bravo, also known as Paso Bravo) is a 1968 Italian-Spanish Spaghetti Western film directed by Salvatore Rosso. It was the first and only film directed by Rosso, who had previously been assistant of a number of directors, notably Pietro Germi. The film was remade in 1969 by Antonio Margheriti as And God Said to Cain; despite being the same story and having the main characters sharing the same names, the two films list different screenwriters. The film underperformed at the Italian box office, grossing only 34 million lire.

== Cast ==
- Anthony Steffen as Gary Hamilton
- Eduardo Fajardo as Acombar
- Giulia Rubini as Anna
- José Jaspe as Paquito
- Vassili Karis as Donny
- José Calvo as Seller of Water
- Adriana Ambesi as Rosy
- Antonio Cintado as Danny
- Claudio Biava as Clark
- Ignazio Leone as Jaime
- Corrado Olmi as Jonathan
