= Bastard, Go and Kill =

1971 film by Gino Mangini

- Directed by: Gino Mangini
- Written by: Sergio Garrone; Gino Mangini
- Produced by: Alvaro Mancori
- Starring: George Eastman
- Cinematography: Giuseppe Gatti
- Music by: Carlo Rustichelli
- Distributed by: Variety Distribution
- Release date: 1971
- Language: Italian

Bastard, Go and Kill (Italian: Bastardo... vamos a matar!) is a 1971 Italian Spaghetti Western film written and directed by Gino Mangini and starring George Eastman.

== Plot ==
The young Mexican Peon Chako is hunted and almost hanged by a group of Americans because of the seduction of the young Susanna. However, he manages to escape and return to Mexico. The experienced bounty hunter Slim follows him and wants to collect the premium for Chako. He catches him but is tricked by him and left in the desert. Chako has now arrived in San Rosario, where he is worshipped as a hero; only the jealous Asuncion sees it differently. She has him thrown into prison. However, the corrupt official receives a higher price from the American, who has now also arrived.

The large landowner Don Felipe meanwhile has two men standing in the way of his shops; he lets henchman Sanchez do the dirty work and then shift the blame onto Chako. So Chako is in jail again; but Slim uses the confusion of a big party to free him and thus to anticipate the murder gang of the now hired Cherokee.

Slim now collaborates with Chako; the two manage to shut down Sanchez, who has meanwhile killed Don Felipe, and restore peace in this area. Slim delivers Sanchez to prison and Chako to Asuncion.

== Cast ==
- George Eastman as Chako
- Lincoln Tate as Gringo
- Antonella Steni as Asuncion Hernandariz
- Furio Meniconi as Don Felipe Morena
- Remo Capitani as Sgt. Hernandez
- Tomas Rudy as Corp. Manuel
- José Manuel Martín as Cherockee
- Franco Lantieri as Sanchez
- Jesús Guzmán as Tobia Velasquez
- Carlos Juliá
- Giorgio Dolfin
- Derio Pino as Timothy - Drunk
- Fulvio Pellegrino as Pat
- Scilla Gabel as Susanna
- Josefina Serratosa as Conchita

== See also ==
- List of Italian films of 1971
