= Captain Singrid =

- Directed by: Jean Leduc
- Written by: Jean Ardy; Jean Leduc; Bertrand Tavernier
- Produced by: Alberto Barsanti
- Starring: Elga Andersen; Robert Woods; Giorgia Moll
- Cinematography: Gilbert Sarthre
- Edited by: Linette Nicolas
- Music by: Dino Castro
- Production companies: Societé Cinématographique Lyre; P.C.A. Produzione Film; Felipe de Solms
- Distributed by: Rank France
- Release date: 3 July 1968
- Running time: 90 minutes
- Countries: France; Italy; Portugal
- Language: French

Captain Singrid (French: Capitaine Singrid) is a 1968 adventure film directed by Jean Leduc and starring Elga Andersen, Robert Woods and Giorgia Moll. It was made as a co-production between France, Italy and Portugal. Location shooting took place in Angola.

== Cast ==
- Elga Andersen as Singrid
- Robert Woods as Saint-Robert
- Giorgia Moll as Carol
- Jean-Claude Bercq as Tarquier
- Marc Michel as Vignal
- Varela Silva as Taximan
- Lopo de Almeida
- Aurelio Gonçalves
- Humberto Gonçalves
- Guerra e Silva
- Raul Moreira
- Artur Peres
- Antonio Pinho
- Lilly Tchiumba
- João Tourais

== Bibliography ==
- John Wakeman. World Film Directors: 1945-1985. H.W. Wilson, 1987.
