= A Fistful of Death =

1971 film directed by Demofilo Fidani

- Directed by: Demofilo Fidani
- Written by: Demofilo Fidani; Alfredo Medori; Mila Vitelli Valenza
- Produced by: Demofilo Fidani
- Starring: Klaus Kinski
- Cinematography: Joe D'Amato
- Edited by: Piera Bruni
- Music by: Lallo Gori
- Release date: 1971
- Running time: 83 minutes
- Country: Italy
- Language: Italian

A Fistful of Death (Italian: Giù la testa... hombre) (also known as Adios Compañeros) is a 1971 Italian Western film directed by Demofilo Fidani and starring Klaus Kinski.

== Cast ==
- Hunt Powers as Butch Cassidy
- Klaus Kinski as Reverend Cotton
- Gordon Mitchell as Ironhead
- Jeff Cameron as Macho Callaghan
- Philip Garner as Sundance Kid
- Dennis Colt as Buck O'Sullivan
- Lucky McMurray
- Grazia Giuvi as Saloon-Girl
- Paul Crain as Member of gang
- Giuseppe Polidori
- Pietro Fumelli
- Manlio Salvatori
- Alessandro Perrella
- Custer Gail
- Giglio Gigli
- Lorenzo Arbore
