= Gold Train (film) =

1965 film by Gianfranco Baldanello

- Directed by: Gianfranco Baldanello
- Screenplay by: Gianfranco Baldanello; Giovanni Vari; Alfonso Brescia
- Story by: Gianfranco Baldanello; Alfredo Varelli
- Produced by: Armando Novelli; Giovanni Vari
- Starring: Carl Möhner; Alessandra Panaro; Ivano Staccioli; Anthony Garuf
- Cinematography: Marcello Masciocchi
- Edited by: Gianfranco Baldanello
- Music by: Ghant
- Production company: TE.PU. Films
- Distributed by: Indipendenti Regionali
- Release date: 1965
- Country: Italy

Gold Train (Italian: 30 Winchester per El Diablo, lit. '30 Winchester for El Diablo') is a 1965 Italian Spaghetti Western film co-written and directed by Gianfranco Baldanello. The film stars Carl Möhner and has occasionally been mistaken for a German western.

== Plot ==
In Canyon City, folks are in a bind dealing with the elusive El Diablo and his gang, causing chaos by hijacking valuable cargo and cattle transports. Jeff Benson is tasked with putting an end to the trouble and safeguarding a gold transport. To complicate matters, the Sheriff's son collaborates with El Diablo. Benson teams up with the bumbling Jerry and affluent farmer Randall for assistance. El Diablo's support comes from the sly Blacky and his romantic partner, the saloon singer Rosario. Despite Pamela, the Sheriff's daughter, developing feelings for Benson, he manages to expose and eliminate the villains, ultimately winning Pamela's heart.

== Cast ==
- Carl Möhner as Jeff Benson
- Alessandra Panaro as Pamela Webb
- Ivano Staccioli as Black
- Antonio Garisa (credited as Anthony Garuf) as Jerry
- José Torres as El Diablo
- Mila Stanic as Rosario
- Guglielmo Spoletini as Blacky
- Renato Chiantoni as Mr. Randall
- Attilio Dottesio as Sheriff Webb
- Mario Dardanelli (credited as Max Darnell)
- Dante Maggio as Billy - telegrapher
- Carlo Accalai as Carl - soldier
- Richard Beery
- Omero Capanna
- Gilberto Galimberti

== Release ==
Gold Train was released in 1965.
