= Erika (film) =

- Directed by: Filippo Walter Ratti
- Written by: Aldo Marcovecchio
- Starring: Pierre Brice; Patrizia Viotti; Carla Mancini
- Cinematography: Girolamo La Rosa
- Edited by: Rolando Salvatori
- Music by: Roberto Pregadio
- Production company: Primax
- Distributed by: King Film International; Butcher's Film Distributors (UK); New World Pictures (US)
- Release date: 8 March 1971
- Running time: 86 minutes
- Country: Italy
- Language: Italian

Erika is a 1971 Italian drama film directed by Filippo Walter Ratti and starring Pierre Brice, Patrizia Viotti and Carla Mancini. The film grossed over 300 million lire on release, but was then banned due to alleged obscene content.

It was shot at the Elios Studios in Rome and on location around Faleria in Lazio. It was shot back-to-back with The Night of the Damned, using the same sets. The art direction was by Elio Balletti.

== Synopsis ==
A free-spirited young German woman arrives to stay with an aristocratic family in Sicily, causing havoc to their lives.

== Cast ==
- Pierre Brice as Renato Laurana
- Patrizia Viotti as Erika
- Giuseppe Fortis as Baron Giovanni Laurana
- Carla Mancini as Concettina
- Bernard De Vries as Luca Laurana
- Franca Haas as Mother of Concettina
- Antonio Anelli as Padre Gaetano
- Irio Fantini
- Carla Calò (as Carol Brown)

== Bibliography ==
- Curti, Roberto. Italian Gothic Horror Films, 1970-1979. McFarland, 2017.
