= Young Lucrezia =

1974 film

- Directed by: Luciano Ercoli
- Written by: Luciano Ercoli
- Produced by: Enzo Doria
- Starring: Simonetta Stefanelli; Massimo Foschi; Paolo Malco; Ettore Manni
- Cinematography: Aldo De Robertis
- Edited by: Angelo Curi
- Music by: Franco Micalizzi
- Production company: T.R.A.C.
- Distributed by: Euro International Film
- Release date: 23 August 1974
- Running time: 80 minutes
- Country: Italy
- Language: Italian

Young Lucrezia (Italian: Lucrezia giovane) is a 1974 Italian historical drama film directed by Luciano Ercoli and starring Simonetta Stefanelli, Massimo Foschi, Paolo Malco and Ettore Manni.

== Plot ==
In early 16th-century Rome, the powerful House of Borgia is led by Rodrigo Borgia, who reigns as Pope Alexander VI. His daughter, Lucrezia Borgia, is deeply entangled in the family's political machinations—complicated by her incestuous relationship with her father. Lucrezia becomes the object of obsession for her brothers: Juan, the Duke of Gandía, and the dangerously jealous Cesare. Consumed by envy and desire, Cesare murders Juan after discovering his affair with Lucrezia, then departs to wage war against the rival Sforza family.

While Cesare is away, Lucrezia becomes engaged to Alfonso of Aragon, but falls in love with Pierotto, Cesare’s close friend and lieutenant, by whom she becomes pregnant. Upon Cesare’s triumphant return, he is driven by rage and jealousy. He murders Pierotto, followed by Alfonso, who by then is already married to Lucrezia.

Lucrezia finally resigns herself to her fate, and accepts her brother as her lover. As the family's internal strife threatens to spiral further, Pope Alexander VI is forced to intervene. To restore peace, he separates the siblings by marrying Lucrezia off to Alfonso I d'Este, Duke of Ferrara; and Cesare to Princess Charlotte of Albret in France.

== Cast ==
- Simonetta Stefanelli as Lucrezia Borgia
- Massimo Foschi as Cesare Borgia
- Paolo Malco as Juan Borgia / Cesare and Lucrezia's brother
- Anna Orso as Giovanna Cattanei(Vannozza)-Lucrezia's mother
- Raffaele Curi as Perotto / Cesare's lieutenant
- Elizabeth Turner as Giulia / the Pope's lover
- Fred Robsahm as Alfonso d'Aragona / Lucrezia's husband
- Ettore Manni as Rodrigo Borgia / Papa Alessandro VI-Lucrezia's father
- Aldo Reggiani as Giovanni Sforza / Duke of Pesaro-
- Piero Lulli as Ludovico Maria Sforza 'il Moro'
- Teodoro Corrà as Sisto Borgia / Cardinale
- Edoardo Florio as The Pope's Private Secretary
- Guglielmo Spoletini as Giaco / Cesare's man
- Giovanni Petrucci as Cesare's Man
- Alessandro Perrella as Cesare's Man
- Vittorio Fanfoni as Tommaso / Alfonso's friend

== Bibliography ==
- Fabio Melelli. Altre storie del cinema italiano. Morlacchi, 2002.
