= And God Said to Cain =

1970 Western film

- Italian film poster
- Directed by: Antonio Margheriti
- Screenplay by: Giovanni Addessi; Antonio Margheriti
- Story by: Giovanni Addessi
- Produced by: Peter Carsten; Giovanni Addessi
- Starring: Klaus Kinski; Peter Carsten; Marcella Michelangeli; Antonio Cantafora; Lee Burton; Alan Collins; Lucio De Santis; María Luisa Sala
- Cinematography: Riccardo Pallottini; Luciano Trasatti
- Edited by: Nella Nannuzzi
- Music by: Carlo Savina
- Production companies: Produzione D.C.7; Peter Carsten-Produktion
- Distributed by: Panta Cinematografica (Italy); Inter-Verleih Film-Gesellschaft (West Germany)
- Release dates: 5 February 1970 (Italy); 5 February 1971 (West Germany)
- Running time: 91 minutes
- Countries: Italy; West Germany
- Language: English

And God Said to Cain (Italian: E Dio disse a Caino, German: Satan der Rache) is a 1970 Gothic Spaghetti Western film. The story is about Gary Hamilton, who is granted a free pardon from a prison work camp and heads out after the men who framed him. The film is set at a stormy night in town when Hamilton takes his revenge. An Italian/West German co-production, the film was directed by Antonio Margheriti and stars Klaus Kinski.

Film historian Howard Hughes noted that the film is a loose remake of Salvatore Rosso's A Stranger in Paso Bravo (1968), featuring many of the same plot points and character names. The film was shot in late 1969 in Italy, and following its release there on February 5, 1970, it was released in West Germany and France. It did not receive a theatrical release in either the United Kingdom or the United States.

== Plot ==
Gary Hamilton, a former officer of the Union Army, is in prison sentenced to forced labor for an attempted robbery. In reality, it was his former friend Acombar who committed the crime and left Hamilton's water bottle at the scene of the crime as evidence, while keeping the stolen gold for himself and thus becoming a powerful landlord. Ten years later, Hamilton is pardoned due to his military record, leading him to return to his hometown, which is now run by Acombar and his cronies. Hamilton is determined to take revenge on Acombar and his wife Mary (a former girlfriend of Hamilton, who betrayed him for Acombar). However, on the stagecoach that takes him to town, he meets Dick, the young son of Acombar, who is unaware of their situation in the past. Hamilton poses as Acombar's friend and instructs Dick to tell his father of his upcoming arrival. Receiving the message, Acombar organizes his men to guard the town and his mansion, and also to avoid at all costs that Gary manages to reach the village.

Hamilton manages to avoid the ambush by using the intricate underground catacombs of the city which were once an old cemetery, and now lead to the church's basement. Hamilton also takes advantage of an incoming tornado that greatly reduces visibility during the night, and he proceeds to massacre all of Acombar's men one by one. This includes the Santamaría brothers, a trio who once were Hamilton's closest compatriots, and who Hamilton kills in unique ways, including being hung from a large bell and crushed by a falling bell.

Dick reaches Hamilton and learns from him the truth about his father and stepmother Mary, but decides to side with Acombar either way. When Hamilton reaches their mansion, he shows up with Acombar's wife. She runs off to warn her husband, but just at that moment Dick enters the room where Acombar is holed up. Thinking it’s Hamilton, Acombar turns and accidentally shoots and kills Dick. Enraged, Acombar accuses his wife of being responsible for Dick's death and kills her. Left alone, he looks for Hamilton in the mansion and finds him surrounded by mirrors that hide his position. During the gunfight, a fire breaks out in the mansion, while Hamilton manages to shoot and kill Acombar. His revenge completed, the next day Hamilton leaves the city on horse, leaving all the gold accumulated by Acombar to the townsfolks to pay for the damages caused during his arrival and to rebuild everything.

== Cast ==
Cast adapted from Filmportal.de.

- Klaus Kinski as Gary Hamilton
- Peter Carsten as Acombar
- Marcella Michelangeli as Maria
- Guido Lollobrigida as Miguel Santamaria
- Antonio Cantafora as Dick Acombar
- Giuliano Raffaelli as Doctor
- Luciano Pigozzi as Francesco Santamaria
- María Luisa Sala as Rosy
- Giacomo Furia as Juanito
- Luigi Bonos as Joë

== Production ==
The story of And God Said to Cain is credited to producer Giovanni Addessi with a screenplay by Addessi and director Antonio Margheriti. Film historian Howard Hughes noted that the film's story was a remake of Salvatore Rosso's A Stranger in Paso Bravo (1968), with And God Said to Cain having the same basic structure, character names, while changing other minor plot elements.

The film was an Italian and West German co-production between Produzione D.C.7. from Rome and Peter Carsten Produktion from Munich. And God Said to Cain was shot in Italy in late 1969. The film was shot at Elios Studio for its Western stage set and at Villa Mussolini, an equestrian complex near Rome. The catacombs scenes were shot at Palazzolo in Manziana. Margheriti said the film was an attempt at mixing genres and said in 1986 that he had fond memories of making the film despite it having a low budget.

== Releases ==
And God Said to Cain was released in Italy on 5 February 1970 and in West Germany as Satan der Rache on 5 February 1971. The film was within the top ten highest grossing Westerns in Italy in 1970, with film historian Howard Hughes describing it as not in "They Call Me Trinity, Compañeros, or Adiós, Sabata league, but still a hit." The film was released outside Italy, including France but did not receive theatrical distribution in the United Kingdom or the United States.

The film was released by Market Video in the United Kingdom on VHS in 1984 as Fury at Sundown. Hughes stated that many VHS and DVD releases were released with parts of the film missing, the wrong aspect ratio or sourced from low-quality prints. Arrow Video released the film alongside Massacre Time, My Name Is Pecos and Bandidos as part of their blu-ray box set Vengeance Trails: Four Classic Westerns on July 27, 2021.

== Reception ==
From contemporary reviews, a reviewer in La Stampa said that the film was shot with formal care with beautiful photograph which they said "masks the limitations (and monotony)" of the films plot of repeated murders with the "prestige of its images."

From retrospective reviews, Thomas Weisser, in his book Spaghetti Westerns - The Good, the Bad and the Violent (1992) said the film was a "lesser" Antonio Margheriti film, saying that it was especially frustrating as how dark the visuals were in the final 20 minutes as the director has shown himself to film higher quality night scenes in his other horror film work.

== See also ==
- Klaus Kinski filmography and discography
- List of Italian films of 1970
