= Run, Psycho, Run =

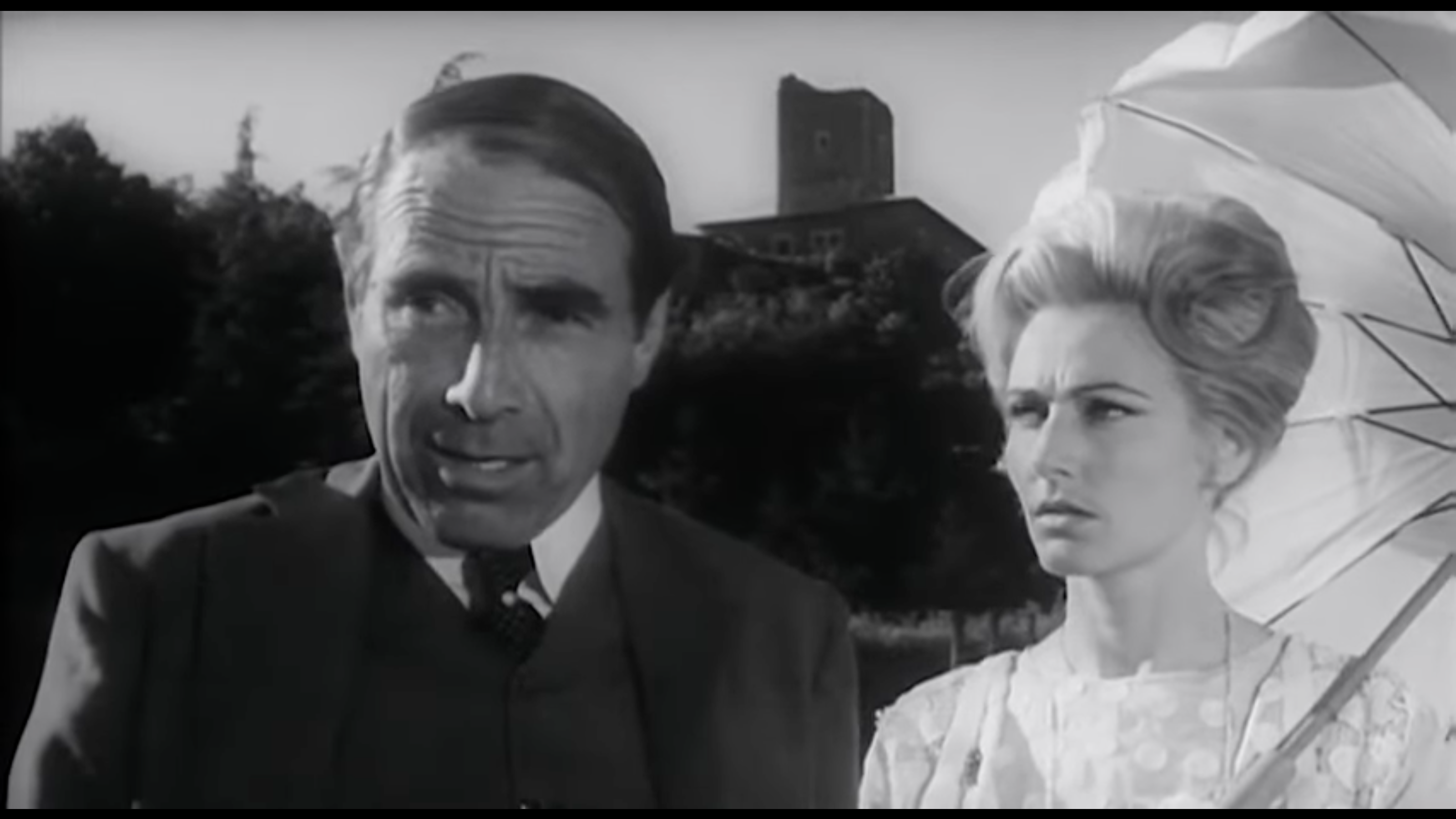
- Merrill and Andersen in a film scene
- Directed by: Brunello Rondi
- Screenplay by: Giuseppe Mangione; Vittoriano Petrilli; Brunello Rondi
- Story by: Vittoriano Petrilli
- Produced by: Gaetano Amata
- Starring: Gary Merrill; Elga Andersen; Georges Rivière
- Cinematography: Carlo Bellero
- Music by: Giovanni Fusco
- Production company: Bianco Nero Film
- Distributed by: Bianco Nero Film
- Release date: July 1968 (Italy)
- Countries: Italy; France

Run, Psycho, Run (Italian: Più tardi, Claire… più tardi, lit. 'Later, Claire....Later') is a 1968 film directed by Brunello Rondi. The film stars Gary Merrill, Elga Andersen and Georges Rivière. Although filmed in the mid 1960s, Run, Psycho, Run was not released until 1968 in Italy. It was subsequently released direct to television in the United States.

== Plot ==
The film is set in Tuscany in 1912 where retired Judge George Dennison, his wife Claire, and their son Robert arrive at a Villa in Mount Argentario for the summer. Shortly after a party, Claire and Robert are both murdered. A year later, Judge Dennison once again returns to the villa with his new fiancée Ann and her son. Ann resembles Claire which he believe will assist him in his scheme to discover the murderer's identity.

== Cast ==
- Gary Merrill as George Dennison
- Elga Andersen as Claire / Ann
- Georges Rivière as Dr. Boyd
- Margarita Robles as Lady Florence, George’s mother
- Adriana Asti as Ruth
- Marina Malfatti as George’s niece

== Production ==
By the late 1950s, director Brunello Rondi was considered a respected and well-known intellectual in Italy. After the lack of financial success of his previous film, The Demon, Rondi explained in an interview in with Dario Argento in 1965 that his next film Run, Psycho, Run, that he had "no intention of making a mystery, or a horror film, or even a suspense yarn, Hitchcock-style. What really interests me is to grasp with a film set in 1912 the origins of today’s disease within the bourgeoisie, and to portray its degeneration with extreme violence. I read very few crime novels in my life. And I must say that I do not even like them very much. In my film there is indeed a crime, and an investigation. But it’s only a pretext, in a story full of hatred set in the last years of the "Belle Époque," when some kind of false euphoria was decomposing, while one could glimpse the first signs of the impending war, the signs of hatred and the strengthening of class struggle."

The film was shot at Castello della Castelluccia in Rome and at the Argentario in Tuscany. Italian film historian Roberto Curti suggested that the film may have been a troubled production, noting the lack of an editor in the credits and that film had a sudden pessimistic ending.

== Release ==
The film was not released for several years after its initial film production, and released in Italy in July 1968 where it was distributed by Bianco Nero Film. The film was released directly to television as Run, Psycho, Run through American International Television (AIP-TV). The dubbing cast included Carolyn De Fonseca and John Karlsen and Gary Merrill dubbing his own voice. Run, Psycho, Run was first shown in the United States on November 2, 1969, on Sacramento's KCRA-Channel 3 as part of his Seven Arts Theater show.

As of 2015, the film has never been released on home video.

== Footnotes ==
=== References ===
- Curti, Roberto (2015). Italian Gothic Horror Films, 1957–1969. McFarland. ISBN 978-1-4766-1989-7.
