= The Uranium Conspiracy =

1978 action-thriller film

- Directed by: Gianfranco Baldanello; Menahem Golan
- Screenplay by: Achille Grioni; David Paulsen; Jean Christian Aurive; Daniele Sangiorgi
- Story by: Yehousha Ben-Porat
- Produced by: Francesco Corti; Menahem Golan
- Cinematography: Adam Greenberg; Antonio Modica
- Music by: Coriolano Gori; Dov Seltzer
- Production companies: Dunamis Cinematografica; Menahem Golan Film; Regina Films
- Distributed by: Constantin Film (Germany); Cannon Film Distributors (US)
- Release date: 10 August 1978
- Running time: 98 minutes
- Countries: Israel; Italy; West Germany
- Language: English (international version)

The Uranium Conspiracy (Hebrew: Kesher Ha'Uranium, German: Agenten kennen keine Tränen or Restrisiko 100%, Italian: A chi tocca, tocca...!) is a 1978 Israeli-German-Italian action-thriller film directed by Gianfranco Baldanello (here credited as Frank G. Carroll) and Menahem Golan.

== Cast ==
- Fabio Testi as Renzo
- Janet Agren as Helga
- Assi Dayan as Dan
- Siegfried Rauch as The Baron
- Oded Kotler as Meyer
- Gianni Rizzo as The Captain
- Herbert Fux as Ulrich
