= Ten Italians for One German =

1962 film

- Directed by: Filippo Walter Ratti
- Cinematography: Aldo Greci
- Music by: Armando Trovajoli
- Release date: 1962
- Language: Italian

Ten Italians for One German (Italian: Dieci italiani per un tedesco (Via Rasella)), is a 1962 Italian historical war drama film directed by Filippo Walter Ratti. It is a dramatization of the Fosse Ardeatine massacre.

== Cast ==
- Gino Cervi as Duke Alfonso di San Severino
- Andrea Checchi as Professor Marcello Rossi
- Carlo D'Angelo as Herbert Kappler
- Sergio Fantoni as Gilberto di San Severino
- Cristina Gajoni as Mariella
- Ivo Garrani as Giovanni Ferroni
- Gloria Milland as Assunta aka Nena
- Oliviero Prunas as Hans Weiss
- Nino Pavese as Pietro Caruso
- Loris Gizzi as The German Consul
