= Adolfo Franci =

Italian screenwriter

Adolfo Franci (27 November 1895, in Florence – 31 January 1954, in Rome) was an Italian screenwriter. He was nominated for the Academy Award for Best Original Screenplay for his work in Shoeshine (1946).

== Selected filmography ==
- The Gates of Heaven (1945)
- Shoeshine (1946)
- Eleonora Duse (1947)
- Heart (1948)
