= Gianfranco Baldanello =

Italian film director (born 1928)

- Born: 13 November 1928; Meran, Italy
- Other name: Frank G. Carroll

Gianfranco Baldanello (born 13 November 1928) is an Italian film director and screenwriter. He often used the alias Frank G. Carroll.

== Career ==
The son of actor Emilio Baldanello and the brother of the script supervisor Maria Grazia, Baldanello entered the cinema industry in 1952 as an assistant director. After serving as second unit director in some sword-and-sandal films, he made his directorial and screenwriting debut in 1965 with Gold Train. He was specialized in the Spaghetti Western genre.

== Selected filmography ==
- Gold Train (1965)
- Kill Johnny Ringo (1966)
- Danger!! Death Ray (1967)
- Long Days of Hate (1968)
- Black Jack (1968)
- Man with the Golden Winchester (1973)
- L'ingenua (1975)
- The Uranium Conspiracy (1978)
