= Paolo Malco =

Italian actor

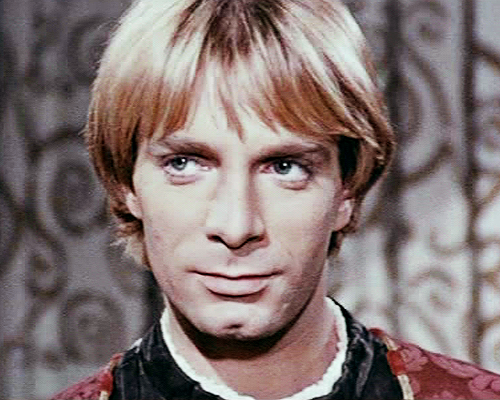
- Paolo Malco in Young Lucrezia (1974)
- Born: 10 April 1947; La Spezia, Italy
- Occupation: Actor
- Known for: Young Lucrezia; The Sinful Nuns of Saint Valentine

Paolo Malco (born 10 April 1947) is an Italian film actor, best known for his roles in horror films, and later in many Italian TV mini-series.

From 1998 to 2006 he was cast in the drama Incantesimo.

== Filmography ==
- 1973: Number one - Teddy Garned
- 1974: Noa Noa - Williams
- 1974: The Sinful Nuns of Saint Valentine - Esteban
- 1974: Young Lucrezia - Juan de Candia Borgia
- 1975–1976: La traccia verde (TV Mini-Series) - John Ginsberg
- 1977: I Am Afraid - Caligari
- 1977: Watch Me When I Kill - Carlo
- 1977: Where the ravens fly silver
- 1979: Return of the Saint (TV Series) - Assassin
- 1979: Dolly sex blonde
- 1980: Masoch - Leopold
- 1981: The Wings of the Dove (TV Mini-Series) - Malcom Densher
- 1981: The House by the Cemetery - Dr. Norman Boyle
- 1982: The New York Ripper - Dr. Paul Davis
- 1982: Scorpion with Two Tails - Mike Grant
- 1983: Escape from the Bronx - Vice President Hoffman
- 1983: Thunder Warrior - Brian Sherman
- 1984: Tuareg - Il guerriero del deserto - Capt. Razman
- 1985: The Assisi Underground - Paolo Josza
- 1986: Midnight Killer - Inspector Piero Terzi
- 1986: Take the Moon (TV Movie)
- 1988: Yellow Rule - Paolo Carbone
- 1988: La casa Dell'Orco (TV Series) - Tom
- 1990: Tre colonne in cronaca - Bruno Lachioma
- 1993: Delitti privati (TV Movie) - Tom
- 1997: L'avvocato delle donne (TV Mini-Series) - Vittorio Fieschi
- 1998: Incantesimo (TV Series) - Giuseppe Ansaldi
- 1998: Incantesimo 2 (TV Series) - Giuseppe Ansaldi
- 2000: Don Matteo (TV Series, first season, the episode entitled The blackmail)
- 2001: Turbo (TV Series, directed by Antonio Bonifacio) - Giacomo Marconi
- 2002: Incantesimo 5 (TV Series) - Giuseppe Ansaldi
- 2002: The house dell'angelo (TV Movie) - Luca Mayer
- 2003: Chiaroscuro (TV Movie) - Franceschini
- 2003: Incantesimo 6 (TV Series) - Giuseppe Ansaldi
- 2003: Claras Schatz (TV Movie) - Pietro Pinacoli
- 2004: Incantesimo 7 (TV Series) - Giuseppe Ansaldi
- 2005: Incantesimo 8 (TV Series) - Giuseppe Ansaldi
- 2006: Un giorno da leone 2 (TV Series)
- 2007: Barbara Wood: Sturmjahre (TV Movie) - James Morgan
- 2007: Who would have thought that ... (TV Movie) - Paolo
- 2007: A Room with a View (TV Movie) - Fabio
- 2008: Centovetrine (Soap Opera in progress)
