= The Ribald Decameron =

1972 film by Giuseppe Vari

- Directed by: Giuseppe Vari
- Written by: Gastone Ramazzotti; Antonio Racioppi
- Starring: Malisa Longo; Giacomo Rizzo; Orchidea De Santis
- Cinematography: Carlo Cerchio
- Edited by: Manlio Camastro
- Music by: Mario Bertolazzi
- Release date: 1972
- Running time: 85 min
- Country: Italy
- Language: Italian

The Ribald Decameron (Italian: Beffe, licenzie et amori del Decamerone segreto, also known as Love, Passion and Pleasure) is a 1972 Italian commedia sexy all'italiana film directed by Giuseppe Vari (here credited as Walter Pisani). Nominally based on the Giovanni Boccaccio's novel Decameron, it is part of a series of derivative erotic comedies based on the success of Pier Paolo Pasolini's The Decameron.

== Plot summary ==
In the Middle Ages, the intrepid Cecco earns eating in taverns and squares as a novelist. His specialty is to re-read the Decameron of Boccaccio, narrating the stories most erotic and licentious, whose theme loves of nuns and friars, and rich women who want to fool their old husbands with bold boys.

== Cast ==
- Dado Crostarosa: Cecco
- Malisa Longo: Madre Lucrezia
- Orchidea De Santis: Dinda
- Giacomo Rizzo: Camillo
- Patrizia Viotti: Tessa
