= A Global Affair =

1964 film by Jack Arnold

- Theatrical release poster
- Directed by: Jack Arnold
- Screenplay by: Bob Fisher; Charles Lederer; Arthur Marx
- Story by: Eugene Vale
- Produced by: Hall Bartlett
- Starring: Bob Hope
- Cinematography: Joseph Ruttenberg
- Edited by: Bud Molin
- Music by: Dominic Frontiere
- Production company: Seven Arts Productions
- Distributed by: Metro-Goldwyn-Mayer
- Release dates: January 30, 1964; February 11, 1964 (Los Angeles); May 7, 1964 (New York)
- Running time: 84 minutes
- Country: United States
- Language: English

A Global Affair is a 1964 American comedy film directed by Jack Arnold and starring Bob Hope, Michèle Mercier, Yvonne De Carlo and Elga Andersen.

== Plot ==
A baby is abandoned at the United Nations headquarters in New York by a mother who heard the UN's Frank Larrimore speak on behalf of children's rights on a radio show. UN docent Lisette finds the baby and brings her to the security office.

Because the baby is in international territory and her nationality is unknown, Frank, a bachelor, is begrudgingly forced to take her to his apartment until a proper home can be found. His landlord forbids children, so Frank smuggles the child into his apartment.

Lisette initially finds Frank to be abrasive and unfit to care for a child. She believes that Frank and his pal Randy are using the baby as a way to meet beautiful single women. But Lisette's opinion changes when she reads his proposal for children's rights, and they fall in love. After a series of mishaps, Frank finally earns her forgiveness and love, and they adopt the baby.

== Cast ==
- Bob Hope as Frank Larrimore
- Michèle Mercier as Lisette
- Robert Sterling as Randy
- Yvonne De Carlo as Dolores
- Elga Andersen as Yvette
- Miiko Taka as Fumiko
- Lilo Pulver as Sonya
- John McGiver as Mr. Snifter
- Nehemiah Persoff as Segura
- Jacques Bergerac as Duval
- Mickey Shaughnessy as Police Officer Dugan
- Rafer Johnson as Ambassador
- Adlai Stevenson as himself
- Hugh Downs as himself

== Production ==
The production of A Global Affair was fraught with conflicts involving director Jack Arnold, Bob Hope and producer Hall Bartlett. Hope insisted on Arnold as the director, but Bartlett disagreed. Arnold also struggled with to elicit an engaging performance from Hope, whom he believed to be aloof, self-centered and unprofessional.

Hope, who required cue cards, was walked through the scenes without cameraman Joseph Ruttenberg rolling film until Hope memorized the lines to avoid scanning the cards. Critic Leonard Maltin noted that "Hope's annual screen endeavors became increasingly erratic ... Such films as Bachelor in Paradise (1961), Call Me Bwana (1963) and A Global Affair buried Hope's one-time reputation as a reliable movie laugh-maker."

According to Arnold, Hope "hated the producer" and would retire to his dressing room when Bartlett visited the set. Hope did not discover that the film had been shot in black-and-white, not in color as he had assumed, until after the film was completed. Arnold and Bartlett clashed over the editing of the film. Arnold accused Bartlett of making major alterations to the film and demanded that his name be removed as the director in the credits.

Bartlett delayed casting the female lead until three days into the shooting. When French actress Michèle Mercier appeared on the set, Arnold discovered that she could not speak a word of English. A translator was engaged and Mercier was coached to deliver her lines phonetically, delaying production.

A Global Affair was released with the Bartlett edits in January 1964.

== Reception ==
In a contemporary review for The New York Times, critic Howard Thompson wrote:

"A Global Affair" ... holds together disarmingly as the ambassadors woo the child in the hero's bachelor apartment. Then comes a parade of nationalistic beauties. The pretties [sic] is Michelle Mercier. ... Sadly, and rather feebly, the curvaceous cavalcade goes on and on till it reaches the bedroom, striking a dull, smutty snag. Just in time, under Jack Arnold's limp direction, the picture is yanked back to the United Nations for Mr. Hope's climactic plea for world unity, symbolized by the child—and what a doll! If only the film had remained on the premises and permitted a beloved clown and tiny seductress to turn the place upside down for its own good.

Henry T. Murdock of The Philadelphia Inquirer wrote: "This is not the brightest item in the gallery of Hope enterprises and even the bemused expression on the face of Adlai Stevenson as he passes Hope and the baby on the street outside the U.N. Building cannot raise the giggles to guffaws in this rather pedestrian comedy. ... [W]hat comes out of the projector is pleasant but tepid."

In The Boston Globe, reviewer Margery Adams remarked: "Most of the plot is ridiculous, although I'll have to admit the sight of maturing Mr. Hope coddling a blonde alert baby is rather affecting. He seems to have a way with her. ... In fact one can pile up quite a few good values, but the resulting picture is still only a trifle better than the average Hollywood comedy."

== Sources ==
- Reemes, Dana M. 1988. Directed by Jack Arnold. McFarland & Company, Jefferson, North Carolina 1988. ISBN 978-0899503318
- Howard Thompson. 1964. "Gladiator and Global Affairs open." The New York Times, May 7, 1964. https://www.nytimes.com/1964/05/07/archives/global-affair-and-gladiators-seven-open.html
