= Elga Andersen =

German actress (1935–1994)

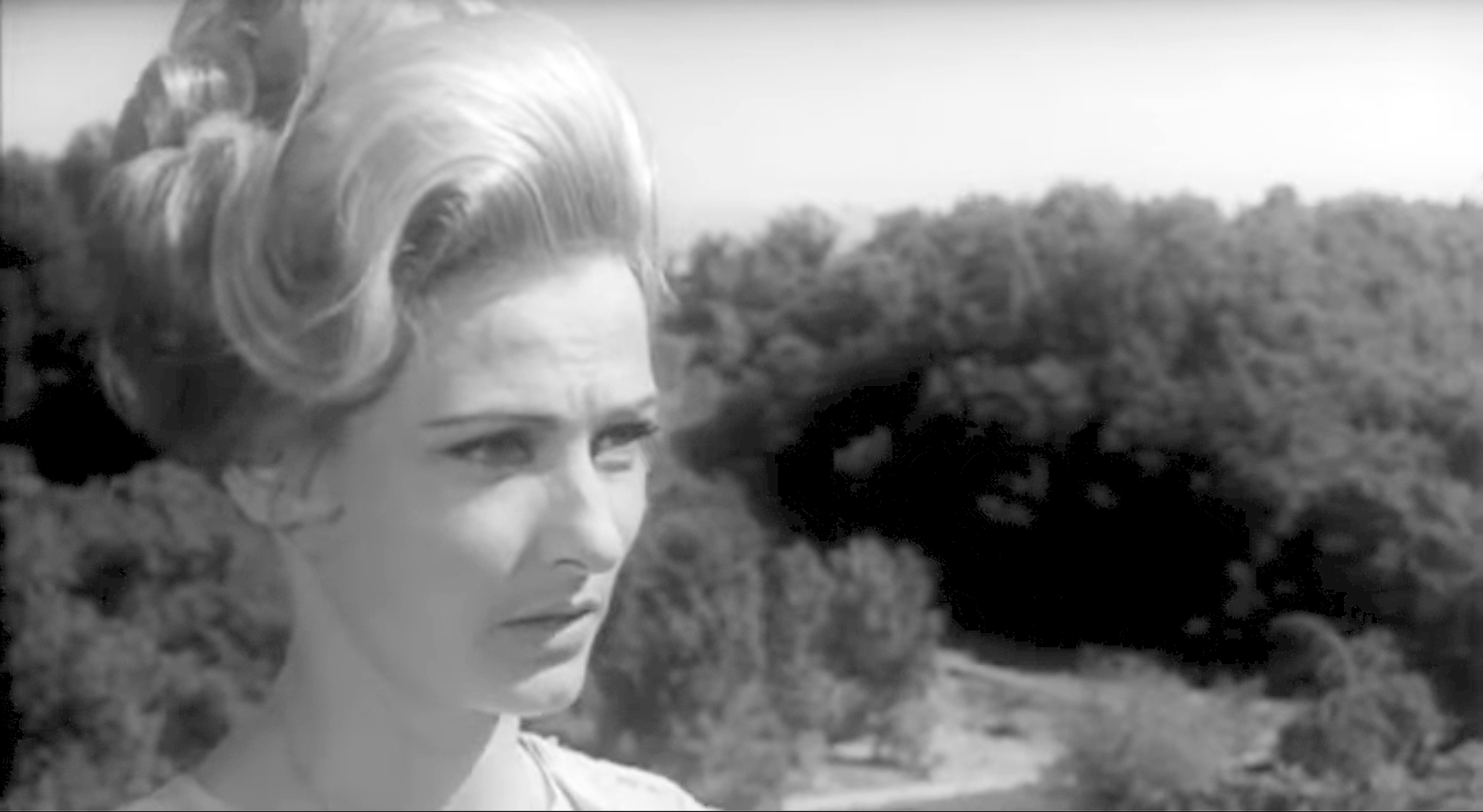
- Andersen in Run, Psycho, Run (1968)
- Born: Helga Hymen (or Hymmen); 2 February 1935; Dortmund, Germany
- Died: 7 December 1994 (aged 59); New York City, US
- Occupations: Actress, singer
- Spouse: Peter R. Gimbel

Elga Andersen (née Helga Hymen or Hymmen) (2 February 1935 – 7 December 1994) was a German actress and singer. She starred in more than one dozen French films in the 1950s and 1960s and also debuted as a recording artist in the 1950s. She performed the songs "Treu sein" and "Sündenlied" in the 1961 film The Guns of Navarone, and co-starred in the 1971 Steve McQueen film Le Mans. Together with her second husband, Peter Gimbel, she embarked on a 1981 diving expedition of the sunken SS Andrea Doria.

== Early life ==
She was born Helga Hymen (or Hymmen) in Dortmund, Germany. She was the only child of her parents; her father was a civil engineer. Her father enlisted with the Wehrmacht two weeks before World War II ended and was dispatched to the Russian front; he was never heard from again. Hymen dropped out of high school at age 16 and worked as an English and French interpreter to help support her and her mother. When she was 18 she moved to Paris and worked as a model.

== Film career ==
She made her acting debut in Les Collegiennes, a 1957 French film directed by André Hunebelle, under the name Elga Hymen.

Otto Preminger selected her for a small role in his film Bonjour Tristesse in 1958 and gave her the stage name "Elga Andersen". Her first starring role was in 1960 in Brazilian Rhapsody. Into the 1970s she appeared in many predominantly European productions. Her American productions included A Global Affair (1964), starring Bob Hope, and Le Mans (1971), in which she played opposite Steve McQueen. Andersen and McQueen reportedly had an affair during the filming. One of the Porsche 911S sports coupes used in the production was given to Andersen as partial compensation for her work in the film.

== Personal life ==
Her first husband was Christian Girard, a Parisian architect. In 1978 she remarried to the American millionaire Peter R. Gimbel.

In 1981 the couple engaged in a million-dollar project to try to recover the vault of the SS Andrea Doria. Andersen said that their main objective was to determine why the ship sank so quickly after being struck by an ocean liner near Nantucket, Massachusetts, on 25 July 1956. At the same time, the salvage crew searched for shipboard vaults that they believed contained thousands of dollars in cash. At the beginning of September 1981, after salvaging one of the vaults, the expedition members decided to end the project. The couple produced two documentaries for American television about their expedition.

Andersen died of cancer on 7 December 1994. In 1995 her ashes and those of Gimbel, who had died in 1987, were interred in the Andrea Doria during a diving expedition.

== Partial filmography ==
- 1957: Les Collégiennes – Hélène
- 1957: Love in the Afternoon – Bit Part (uncredited)
- 1957: La polka des menottes – Une infirmière (uncredited)
- 1957: Girl Merchants
- 1958: Bonjour Tristesse – Denise
- 1958: Ascenseur pour l'échafaud – Frieda Bencker
- 1958: Solang' die Sterne glüh'n – Doris Hoff, Fotografin
- 1958: Ist Mama nicht fabelhaft? – Evelyn
- 1958: So ein Millionär hat's schwer – Alice Sorel
- 1960: I baccanali di Tiberio
- 1960: Os Bandeirantes – Elga
- 1961: Le monocle noir – Martha
- 1961: Mourir d'amour – Karin, la secrétaire
- 1962: Le scorpion – Corinne
- 1962: The Eye of the Monocle – Erika Murger
- 1962: L'empire de la nuit – Widow
- 1963: Your Turn, Darling – Valérie Pontiac / Montana
- 1964: A Global Affair – Yvette
- 1964: Coffin from Hong Kong – Stella
- 1965: DM-Killer – Inge Moebius
- 1965: Coast of Skeletons – Elizabeth Von Koltze
- 1966: The Battle of the Mods – Sonia
- 1966: Johnny Colt – Caroline Williams
- 1968: Captain Singrid – Singrid
- 1968: Run, Psycho, Run – Claire/ Ann
- 1968: Più tardi Claire, più tardi... – Claire / Ann
- 1970: Sex-Power – Lorelei
- 1971: Le Mans – Lisa Belgetti
- 1971: Un omicidio perfetto a termine di legge – Monica Breda
- 1971: Detenuto in attesa di giudizio – Ingrid Di Noi
- 1971–1974: Aux frontières du possible (French TV show) – Barbara Andersen (final appearance)
- 1973: Night Flight from Moscow – Kate Cross
