= Maurizio Lucidi =

Italian director, screenwriter and editor

- Born: 1932; Florence, Italy
- Died: 2005 (aged 72–73); Italy
- Other names: Mark Lender
- Occupation(s): Film director, screenwriter

Maurizio Lucidi (1932–2005) was an Italian director, screenwriter and editor, sometimes credited as Mark Lender.

Born in Florence, Lucidi started his career as film editor in the early 1960s. In 1964 he was assistant director for Pier Paolo Pasolini on The Gospel According to St. Matthew. He made his directorial debut in 1966 with the fantasy film Hercules the Avenger; later he directed a number of genre films, especially Spaghetti Westerns.

== Selected filmography ==
- The Changing of the Guard (1962)
- My Name Is Pecos (1966)
- Pecos Cleans Up (1967)
- Halleluja for Django (1967)
- La battaglia del Sinai (1969)
- Probabilità zero (1968)
- It Can Be Done Amigo (1971)
- The Designated Victim (1971)
- Stateline Motel (1973)
- Due cuori, una cappella (1975)
- Street People (1975)
- Il marito in collegio (1977)
- Tutto suo padre (1978)
- Perché non facciamo l'amore? (1981)
