= Patrizia Viotti =

Italian glamour model and film actress

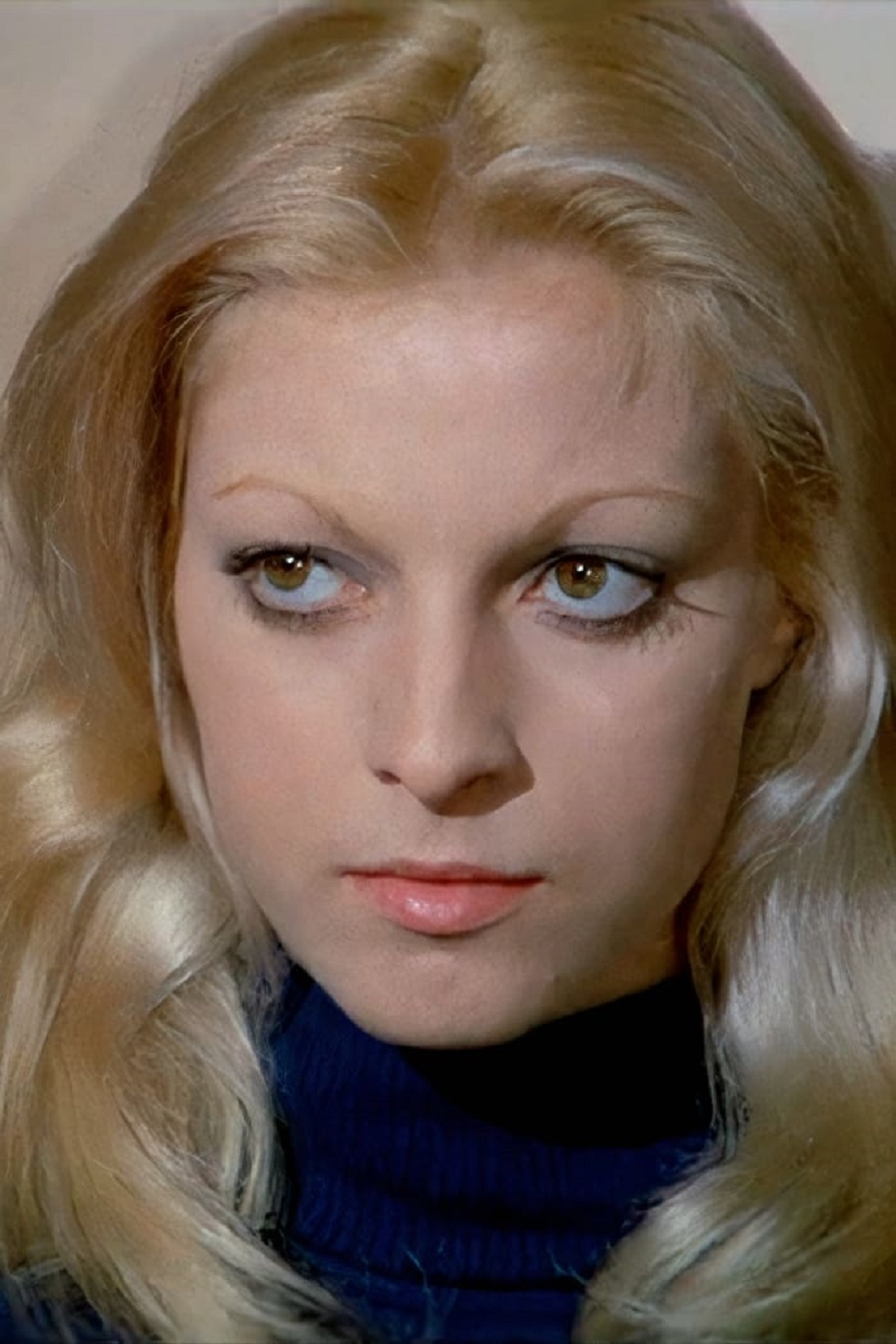
- Viotti in La morte scende leggera (1972)
- Born: 25 June 1950; Rome, Lazio, Italy
- Died: 24 August 1994 (aged 44); Rome, Lazio, Italy
- Occupation: Actress
- Years active: 1971-1974 (film)

Patrizia Viotti (25 June 1950 - 24 August 1994) was an Italian glamour model and film actress.

She first gained attention in 1969 through her relationship with the singer Mal, whom she had met at the Piper Club in Rome. On the back of this, she starred in several erotic-themed films from 1971. However her drug addiction led to the end of her film career in 1974, and two brief spells in prison.

Her sister Piera Viotti was also an actress.

== Filmography ==
- Erika (1971) as Erika
- The Night of the Damned (1971) as Danielle Duprey
- Amuck! (1972) as Sally Reece
- The Ribald Decameron (1972) as Tessa
- Canterbury proibito (1972) as Sister Chiara (segment "Due suore")
- La morte scende leggera (1972) as Liz
- Charley's Nieces (1974) as Claude

== Sources ==
- Curti, Roberto. Italian Gothic Horror Films, 1970-1979. McFarland, 2017.
