= Savage Guns (1971 film) =

1971 film

- Directed by: Demofilo Fidani
- Starring: Robert Woods
- Music by: Lallo Gori
- Release date: 1971
- Running time: 85 min.
- Country: Italy
- Language: Italian

Savage Guns (Italian: Era Sam Wallach... lo chiamavano 'così sia', and also known as His Name Was Sam Walbash, But They Call Him Amen) is a low-budget Spaghetti Western from 1971, directed by Demofilo Fidani and starring Robert Woods.

== Cast ==
- Robert Woods as Sam Wallash (credited as Robert Wood)
- Dino Strano as Mash Donovan (credited as Dean Stratford)
- Benito Pacifico as Hernandes (credited as Dennis Colt)
- Custer Gail as Sturges
- Simonetta Vitelli as Fanny (credited as Simone Blondell)
- Marina Malfatti as Marge (uncredited)
- Lincoln Tate (uncredited)
- Gordon Mitchell (uncredited)
- Peter Martell (uncredited)
