= Bandidos (film) =

1967 film by Massimo Dallamano

- Italian film poster by Renato Casaro
- Directed by: Massimo Dallamano
- Screenplay by: Romano Migliorini; Giovan Battista Mussetto; Juan Cobos
- Story by: Juan Cobos; Luis Laso
- Produced by: Solly V. Bianco
- Starring: Enrico Maria Salerno; Terry Jenkins; Venantino Venantini; María Martín; Marco Guglielmi; Cris Huerta
- Edited by: Gian Maria Messeri
- Music by: Egisto Macchi
- Production companies: E.P.I.C; Hesperia Films
- Distributed by: Euro International Films
- Release date: October 1967 (Italy)
- Countries: Italy; Spain

Bandidos is a 1967 spaghetti Western film. It marked the directorial debut of then-cinematographer Massimo Dallamano.

== Synopsis ==
Renowned gunman Richard Martin is travelling on a train which is held up by Billy Kane, a former student of Martin's. Kane spares Martin, but only after shooting his hands. Years later, Martin meets an escaped convict, wrongly convicted for the train robbery. Martin trains his new student and both men seek out Billy Kane.

== Cast ==
- Enrico Maria Salerno as Richard Martin
- Terry Jenkins as Philip Raymond ("Ricky Shot")
- María Martín as Betty Starr
- Venantino Venantini as Billy Kane
- Fred Robsahm as Kanes Handlanger
- Cris Huerta as Vigonza
- Marco Guglielmi as Kramer

== Production ==
Bandidos was Massimo Dallamano's first film as a director. The film was produced by Solly V. Bianco, who had previously worked with Dallamano on Buffalo Bill, Hero of the Far West. The film was an Italian and Spanish co-production, between E.P.I.C. Film (Edizioni Produzioni Internazionali Cinematografic) in Rome and Hesperia Films in Madrid. The film was shot in both Italy and Spain, including near Madrid. In Lazio in Italy, Dallamano shot at the gorge in Tolfa and along the Treja river. Although Emilio Foriscot was the film's credited cinematographer, camera operator Sergio D'Offizi recalled that Dallamano lit and shot Bandidos entirely by himself.

== Release ==
Bandidos was first released in October 1967 by Euro International. The film was released as Bandidos in most territories. It occasionally referred to as Crepa tu... che vivo io... but all promotional material for the film refers to it as Bandidos. The film was released in the United Kingdom by Butcher's Film Service. It was released on home video in the UK in the early 1980s by Fletcher Video. Arrow Video released the film alongside Massacre Time, My Name Is Pecos and And God Said to Cain as part of their Blu-ray box set Vengeance Trails: Four Classic Westerns on July 27, 2021.

== Reception ==
From contemporary reviews, the Monthly Film Bulletin gave the film a brief review stating that Bandidos was "marked by some largely gratuitous violence and a strident soundtrack" and that "only the device of a playing card tied to a metronome to provide a moving target for marksmanship practise strikes a spark of originality."

== See also ==
- List of Italian films of 1967
