= Fred Robsahm =

Norwegian movie actor

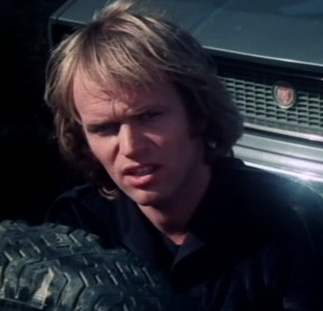
- Born: 29 June 1943; Oslo, Norway
- Died: 26 March 2015 (aged 71); Lillesand, Norway
- Occupation: Actor

Fred Otto Robsahm (29 June 1943 – 26 March 2015) was a Norwegian film actor. He worked on a few Italian Spaghetti Westerns in the 1960s and 1970s. He was married to Italian film actress Agostina Belli for 15 years. The story of Robsahm's life was told by Even Benestad in the documentary Natural Born Star, which premiered in 2007. His sister is the model, film director, and editor Margarete Robsahm.

Robsahm contracted HIV at the end of the 1980s.

== Selected filmography ==
- 1968 - Barbarella
- 1968 - Bandidos
- 1969 - Flashback
- 1969 - Nel giorno del signore
- 1969 - Django the Bastard
- 1971 - Black Killer
- 1973 - Woman Buried Alive
- 1973 - Ingrid sulla strada
- 1974 - Il figlio della sepolta viva
- 1974 - Young Lucrezia
- 1974 - Carambola!
- 1975 - So Young, So Lovely, So Vicious...
- 2007 - Natural Born Star
