= Amuck! =

1972 film by Silvio Amadio

- Italian theatrical release poster with art by Renato Casaro
- Italian: Alla ricerca del piacere
- Directed by: Silvio Amadio
- Written by: Silvio Amadio
- Starring: Farley Granger; Barbara Bouchet; Rosalba Neri; Umberto Raho; Patrizia Viotti; Dino Mele; Petar Martinovic; Nino Segurini
- Cinematography: Aldo Giordani
- Edited by: Antonio Siciliano
- Music by: Teo Usuelli
- Production company: West Film
- Distributed by: Delta
- Release date: 1972
- Country: Italy

Amuck! (Italian: Alla ricerca del piacere, lit. 'In Pursuit of Pleasure') is a 1972 Italian giallo film written and directed by Silvio Amadio.

== Plot ==
Greta, a beautiful blonde American, is hired as the new secretary to Richard Stuart, a famous novelist who lives on an island near Venice with his wife Eleanora. Sally, the previous secretary, had disappeared without a trace. Unbeknownst to Richard and Eleanora, Greta has taken the job in order to investigate the disappearance of her lover, Sally.

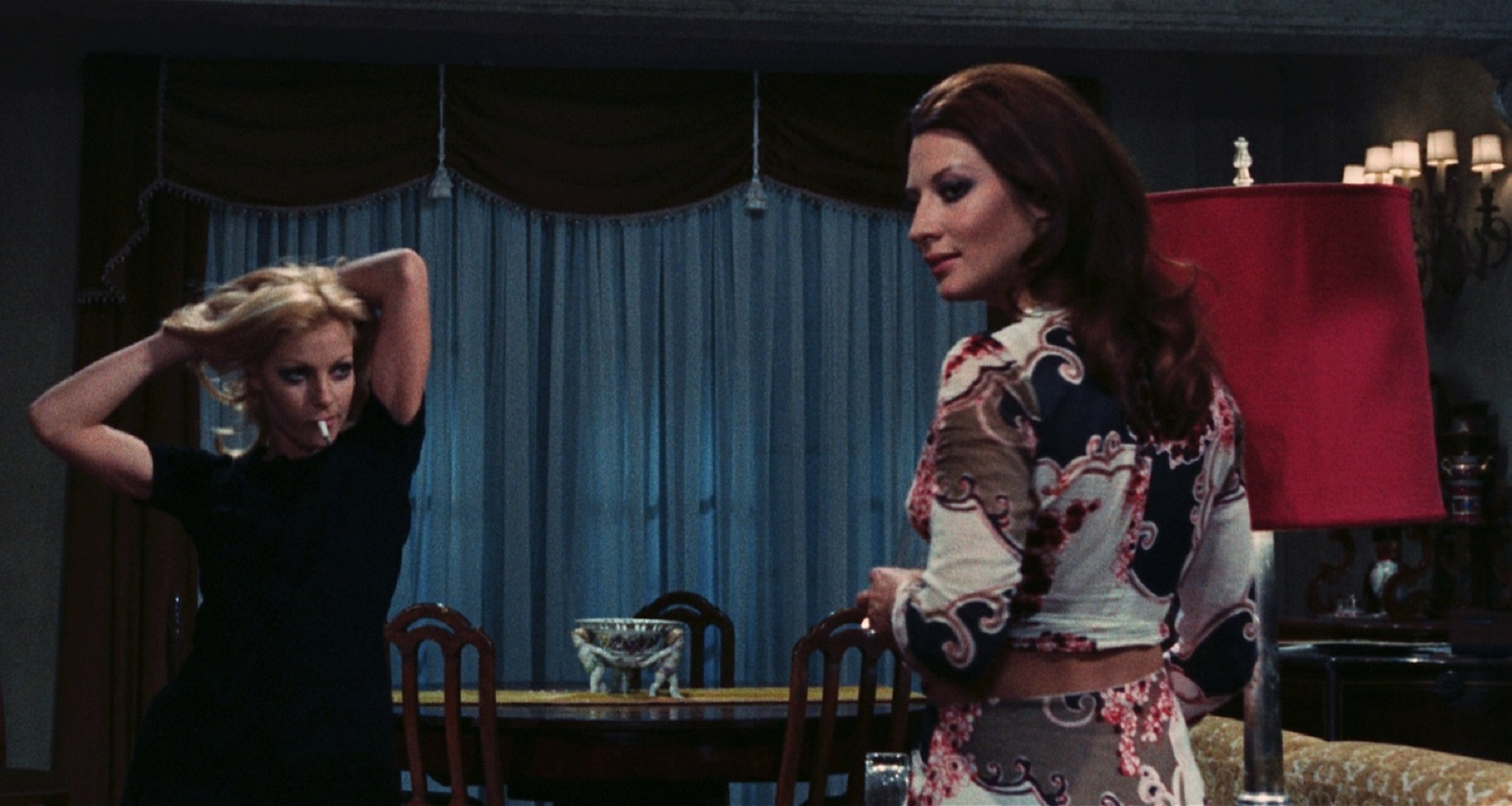
Patrizia Viotti and Rosalba Neri in a scene from the film.

Greta learns that Sally was accidentally killed in the heat of passion during one of the kinky sex games the Stuarts hold in their mansion occasionally; a hulking man-brute named Rocco lost control and strangled the girl. The bizarre couple then kills their butler when he attempts to blackmail them over the incident. All that remains is for Greta to be disposed of, then the crimes will never be uncovered. Eleanora lures Greta into a three-way private orgy with Rocco and herself, in an attempt to get the easily excited Rocco to repeat his careless crime of passion one last time.

== Cast ==
- Barbara Bouchet as Greta Franklin
- Farley Granger as Richard Stuart
- Rosalba Neri as Eleanora Stuart
- Nino Segurini as Commissioner Antonelli
- Umberto Raho as Giovanni, the butler
- Petar Martinovic as Rocco
- Dino Mele as Sandro
- Patrizia Viotti as Sally Reece

== Production ==
The original working titles for the film included Replica di un delitto (lit. 'Repetition of a Crime') and Il passo dell'assassino (lit. 'The Killer's Stride). In his book on Italian gialli, Troy Howarth described the film as belonging to the trend of "sexy-trashy gialli" opposed to burgeoning films influenced by the films of Dario Argento. Film historian Roberto Curti echoed this statement, that along with Amadio's Smile Before Death (1972) were variations on the erotic gialli of the late-1960s.

== Release ==
Amuck! was first released in 1972. The film was released theatrically in the United States as Maniac Mansion in the United Kingdom as Hot Bed of Sex. It was released by Something Weird Video on home video as Leather and Whips.

== Reception ==
From contemporary reviews, David McGillivray of the Monthly Film Bulletin reviewed an 81-minute version of the film titled Hot Bed of Sex. McGillivray stated the film was "cluttered with preposterous suspects" and "ham-fisted attempts at building suspense."

From retrospective reviews, Adrian Luther-Smith wrote in his book Blood and Black Lace defined the film as "another seductive erotic thriller from Silvio Amadio" recommending it to admirers of Rosalba Neri and Barbara Bouchet while finding the score occasionally resembled an episode of Star Trek and that "the sedate Seventies pace may be too slow for viewers brought up on a diet of MTV and bombastic Hollywood hyperbole."
