= Massacre Time =

1966 film directed by Lucio Fulci

- Film poster by Sandro Simeoni
- Directed by: Lucio Fulci
- Screenplay by: Fernando Di Leo
- Story by: Fernando Di Leo
- Produced by: Oreste Coltellacci
- Starring: Franco Nero; George Hilton; John M. Douglas; Lynn Shane; Aysanoa Runachagua; Tchang Yu; Nino Castelnuovo
- Cinematography: Riccardo Pallottini
- Edited by: Ornella Micheli
- Music by: Coriolano Gori
- Production companies: Mega Film; Colt Produzioni Cinematografiche; L.F. Produzioni Cinematografiche
- Distributed by: Panta Cinematografica (Italy)
- Release date: 10 August 1966 (Italy)
- Running time: 83 minutes
- Country: Italy
- Language: Italian
- Box office: 1.3 billion lira

Massacre Time (Italian: Le colt cantarono la morte e fu... tempo di massacro, lit. 'The colts sang death and it was... massacre time') is a 1966 Italian Spaghetti Western film starring Franco Nero and George Hilton.

== Plot ==
In New Mexico, Tom Corbett is a prospector who receives a message from a family friend named Carradine, telling him to return immediately to the home where he lived with his wealthy widowed mother. When she died years earlier, she left her house and land to Tom's brother, Jeff, and insisted that Tom be sent away. Money was sent to support him, but her dying wish was that Tom stay away from Laramie Town. Nevertheless, Tom says goodbye to his foreman, Murray, and rides back home.

Arriving in Laramie Town, Tom finds the house where he grew up in dilapidated condition. Tom is told by two rough-looking thugs to leave. The land belongs to a man called Mr. Scott, and he is warned to beware when he sees the Scott sign, which is a big letter 'S' stamped onto a big letter 'J'.

Riding back into town, Tom sees that the Scott sign is all over town: on the bank, the saloon, everywhere, and soon sees why the owners are afraid. Jason Scott, a wealthy businessman, rides into the town square with his sadistic son Junior Scott, surrounded by a large posse of thugs. The Scotts catch a family moving out of town because of the low wages the Scotts pay them. Junior suddenly kills the elderly couple's teenage son in cold blood and laughs maniacally.

Tom inquires about Jeff Corbett and is led to an elderly Chinese blacksmith, Sonko, where Jeff works. Sonko directs Tom to the house of his employee. Tom finds Jeff living in a run-down shack on the outskirts of town along with their old Indian housemaid Mercedes. Jeff is revealed to be a drunkard, having never gotten over the loss of his mother and the farm. Both Jeff and Mercedes insist that Tom leave immediately but refuse to discuss why Tom has been summoned. They are also anxious that Tom shouldn't be seen by anyone else in town who might recognize him. Determined to find out what is going on, Tom rides back into town, observed by a few of Scott's men.

That evening at the local saloon, there is a brawl, and Jeff and Tom get roughed up by Scott's men. Jeff handles himself admirably in the fight, despite being drunk. Tom joins the fray after watching his brother's antics, and the two of them stagger out together. However, Jeff continues to insist that Tom leave town. Instead, Tom visits the Carradine family to find out why the letter was sent to him. But before Carradine and Tom can discuss anything, there is a massacre. The Carradines are all killed by shadowy assailants, but Tom escapes unharmed.

The next day, Tom learns that talking to the townsfolk about Mr. Scott only leads them to give him dire warnings. Tom decides to go out himself to the Scott ranch to resolve what is going on. Jeff offers to come along with him. Despite being drunk, Jeff's shooting skills have not been dulled by his tequila intake. Jeff single-handedly shoots six of Scott's men, plus three more at a guard post to assist Tom's approach to the isolated Scott ranch, after gaining Tom's promise that he will take responsibility for killing them.

Tom walks into the Scott ranch house to find a high-society party in progress. He confronts Scott, but the wealthy man refuses to talk to him, claiming he's too busy with the party. But Scott Junior is not so indifferent. He gloatingly demonstrates his dexterity with a whip, giving the struggling Tom a protracted and humiliating beating in front of the assembled guests.

Back at Jeff's shack, a battered Tom is tended to by Mercedes. But a shadowy gunman passes the window and kills her. Enraged, Jeff resolves to join his brother's quest for vengeance against the Scotts. He tells Tom that a few months earlier, the Scotts had his father killed. But when Tom responds with "Our father?" Jeff snarls, "I said MY father."

The two men encounter Mr. Scott at a remote, tumble-down shack where Jeff finally reveals his secret: Mr. Scott is really Tom's father. Tom and Jeff are only half-brothers. Mr. Scott reveals that it was he who sent for him, because he wants Tom to live at the ranch with him as his heir. Mr. Scott had no part in the killings of Tom's father, the Carradines, or Mercedes. He tremblingly informs Tom that Scott Junior, Tom's younger half-brother, is insane and has been spoiled all his life by wealth and power; he is afraid that Scott Junior has gone too it. Before Mr. Scott can continue, Scott Junior appears and shoots him dead. The rest of the Scott Junior party ride back to the ranch.

Jeff is tempted to let the matter rest as a family affair but agrees to accompany Tom on his mission to bring down Scott Junior and his henchmen. In a long and climactic gunfight, Tom and Jeff assault the Scott ranch and kill all of Scott Junior's gang. During the battle, Jeff saves Tom's life from Junior when he shoots the gun out of Junior's hand, when he was going to shoot Tom in the back. The insane Scott Junior retreats from a bare-knuckle fight with Tom and a struggle ensues on a narrow wooden walkway between two ranch buildings. After a brief fist-fight, the maniac Scott Junior loses his balance as he tries to force Tom over the side and instead falls to his death, landing in a dove-coop. As several white doves fly into the air, the drunken Jeff makes as if to shoot at the birds. Tom's hand gently lowers the muzzle of Jeff's gun and shakes his head. The meaning is that there's no need for any more shooting.

== Cast ==
- Franco Nero as Tom Corbett
- George Hilton as Jeff Corbett
- Nino Castelnuovo as Jason "Junior" Scott
- Giuseppe Addobbati as Mr. Scott
- Linda Sini as Brady
- Tom Felleghy as Murray
- Rina Franchetti as Mercedes
- Tchang Yu as Undertaker
- Aysanoa Runachagua as Sonko

== Production ==
After the release of A Fistful of Dollars starring Clint Eastwood, a wave of Italian Spaghetti Westerns began production in Italy; among these films was Django starring Franco Nero. The screenplay for Massacre Time was primarily written by Fernando Di Leo, who entered the film business in the early 1960s as a screenwriter and assistant director; having previously co-written A Fistful of Dollars, For a Few Dollars More, A Pistol for Ringo and The Return of Ringo, Massacre Time marked his first solo screenplay credit, although Di Leo's writing partner Enzo Dell'Aquila and director Lucio Fulci made uncredited contributions. The film's title was taken from the novel Tempo di massacaro by Franco Enna. Fulci would later claim that he pushed Di Leo to make the film as violent as possible, which Di Leo refuted, stating "I don't know anything about Fulci's claims that he insisted that I write a very violent movie [...] Fulci only directed well what was already on the page [...] The script was good and ready and he liked it the way it was, otherwise I'd have complied to his demand if there had been any".

Massacre Time was originally supposed to be an Italian-Spanish co-production with Ringo co-star George Martin attached to the leading role of Tom Corbett, but the Spanish co-producers withdrew their involvement and funding after Fulci refused to tone down the script's violence, thus preventing Martin from taking the role. Having decided to shoot the film entirely in Italy on a lower budget, Fulci instead cast Nero as Tom at the suggestion of his assistant director, Giovanni Fago, on the basis of production stills from Django. Uruguayan actor George Hilton was cast in the role of Jeffrey; reflecting on the film, Hilton described Fulci as "a difficult man to work with" with an "overbearing personality and that could be difficult."

== Release ==
Massacre Time was released in Italy on 10 August 1966.

Although an international English-language version was made, a redubbed English version produced by American International Pictures was theatrically released in the United States in December 1968 as The Brute and the Beast, with a longer running time (88 minutes); it was one of only two Spaghetti Westerns imported to the United States by AIP, the other being God Forgives... I Don't!. It was released in the U.K. as Colt Concert. The film was marketed in Denmark and West Germany as a Django film.

Arrow Video released the film alongside My Name Is Pecos, Bandidos and And God Said to Cain as part of their Blu-ray box set Vengeance Trails: Four Classic Westerns on July 27, 2021.
