= Lincoln Tate =

American actor and Marine

- Born: December 1, 1934; Harris County, Texas, US
- Died: December 16, 2001 (aged 67); Woodland Hills, Los Angeles, US
- Occupation: Actor
- Years active: 1965–1988

Lincoln Tate (born James Harmon Kennelly, December 1, 1934 – December 16, 2001) was an American actor and former Marine. He appeared in more than twenty films from 1965 to 1988.

He played the role of Schad in The Big Valley episode “Forty Rifles” (season 1, episode 2). After several minor roles in American films and television series he moved to Italy where he had the lead role in several Spaghetti Westerns. He returned to the United States for several roles with his final film appearance being in Grotesque (1988) where he also is credited as an associate producer.

== Filmography ==
Year	Title	Role	Notes
1966	Texas Across the River	Man	Uncredited
1968	The Fuller Report	Pearson	
1971	Bastard, Go and Kill	Gringo	
1971	Il suo nome era Pot	Steve	
1971	Holy Water Joe	Holy Water Joe	
1971	Savage Guns	Himself	Uncredited
1972	Spirito Santo e le 5 magnifiche canaglie	Powers	
1972	Return of Halleluja	Archie	
1973	...E il terzo giorno arrivò il corvo	Link Kennedy / Connelly	
1973	Le Amazzoni - Donne d'amore e di guerra	Zeno	
1973	The Bloody Hands of the Law	Joe Gambino	
1973	Più forte sorelle	Amen	
1981	The Legend of the Lone Ranger	George A. Custer	
1988	Grotesque	Blane	(final film role)
