= Robert Woods (actor) =

American film and television actor, born 1936

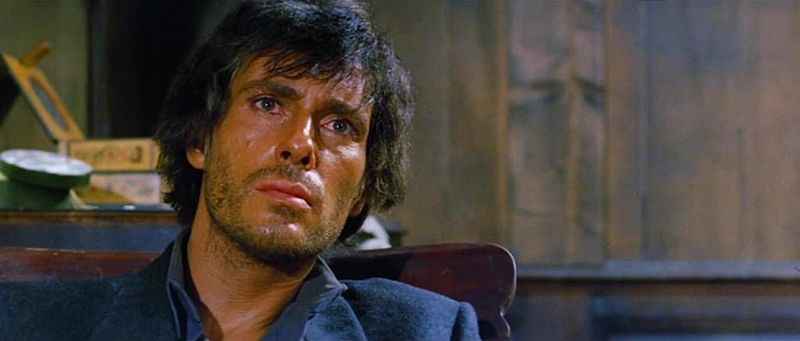
- Robert Woods in The Reward's Yours... The Man's Mine (1969)
- Born: July 19, 1936 (age 89); Colorado, United States
- Other name: Robert Wood
- Occupation: Actor
- Years active: 1960-present

Robert Woods (born July 19, 1936), sometimes credited as Robert Wood, is an American film and television actor. He is noted for extensive work in Spaghetti Westerns and in the European film industry in the 1960s and 1970s. His numerous credits include parts in over 50 films, including 42 in which he was top-billed.

== Biography ==
Robert Woods was born on July 19, 1936, in Colorado. He began his film career after being selected by George Hamilton to be his stand-in in Where the Boys Are (1960) where he had an uncredited role.

== Partial filmography ==
- Where the Boys Are (1960)
- Battle of the Bulge (1965)
- Five Thousand Dollars on One Ace (1964)
- Man from Canyon City (1965)
- Four Dollars for Vengeance (1966)
- Seven Guns for the MacGregors (1966)
- Johnny Colt (1966)
- My Name Is Pecos (1967)
- Massacre Mania (1967)
- Pecos Cleans Up (1967)
- Black Jack (1968)
- The Belle Starr Story (1968)
- Captain Singrid (1968)
- Gatling Gun (1968)
- The Young Tigers of Hong Kong (1969)
- The Reward's Yours... The Man's Mine (1969)
- Savage Guns (1971)
- Lucifera Demon Lover (1972)
- Kill the Poker Player (1972)
- White Fang and the Hunter (1975)
