= Black Killer =

1971 film

- Film poster
- Directed by: Carlo Croccolo
- Written by: Luigi Angelo; Carlo Croccolo
- Produced by: Oscar Santaniello
- Starring: Klaus Kinski
- Cinematography: Franco Villa
- Edited by: Luigi Castaldi
- Music by: Daniele Patucchi
- Distributed by: Variety Distribution
- Release date: 27 November 1971
- Running time: 85 minutes
- Country: Italy
- Language: Italian

Black Killer is a 1971 Italian Spaghetti Western film directed by Carlo Croccolo and starring Klaus Kinski.

== Plot ==
James Webb arrives to town with a casket full of books. He discovers that the judge co-operates with the wanted O'Hara brothers, who make farmers sign over their land deeds and then kill them. The deeds are then deposited with the judge. Webb, who has presented himself to the judge as a lawyer, finds that since these deeds are not registered they will forfeit to the judge if the O'Haras are killed.

The O'Haras suspect Webb to be a government agent, but later they intercept and kill a government inspector who was sent to investigate. They also raid the town and kill the sheriff in anger when they don't receive enough protection money.

Burt Collins arrives in town and asks for his brother Peter, who lives outside of town with his Native American wife, Sarah. He kills two of O'Hara's men who cheat at gambling. He seems willing to follow the advice of Ramon O'Hara (who owns the saloon) to leave in the morning, but Webb visits his hotel room to suggest a plan.

In the morning Burt is challenged by three of O'Hara's men and kills them. Webb has earlier convinced the judge that according to the law he must become sheriff if none is appointed, and Burt is offered to become sheriff instead of standing trial. He accepts and the judge suggests that they share the land 50-50. The O'Haras are told that Burt is visiting his brother. They surround the house and capture the brothers when they come out. Burt is beaten unconscious and Peter is killed when he tries to stop them from raping Sarah. Then they set fire to the house.

Burt and Sarah now avenge themselves on the O'Hara gang. They get information from Consuela, a young woman who works at the saloon. In the morning after the gang's celebration at the saloon one of the malefactors is killed by gunshots from Burt and by an arrow from Sarah. The O'Haras have Consuela taken to a mine to serve as bait to catch Burt. Burt and Sarah kill the guards with bow and arrow and a knife. They enter the cave and kill the gang member who is in the process of raping Consuela, but the girl is killed by a stray bullet.

Sarah and Burt kill the guards at the O'Hara ranch with bow and arrow and a snare. They hang one of the guards outside the window to make the men come out. Inside, Burt confronts Pedro O'Hara in the darkness of a closed room. When a man opens the door he exposes Pedro and is killed with him. Outside Sarah picks off the men with a rifle, until the remaining gang members run away, leaving Miguel O'Hara. She shoots an arrow with a burning explosive attached to it, which explodes and blinds Miguel. He falls down, cursing them.

Webb goes to the judge and accuses him of his scheme, who offers him 50%. When the offer is refused he takes a gun from his drawer but is disarmed by Webb and forced to sign several papers. After killing the judge, Webb picks the safe and takes papers and money. He is surprised by Sarah, who was sent by Burt to detain him, but he tricks her, takes her gun and ties her up.

Burt arrives into town with the bodies of the O'Haras and offers Ramon a choice between the gun and jail. He shoots Ramon's rifle from his hand and shoots another man coming down the stairs. The two now fight and come out in the street, where O'Hara uses a hayfork. Webb appears and shoots down two O'Hara henchmen from the roof. Ramon goes for a rifle in a saddle holster but is shot by a pistol that Webb throws to Burt.

Citizens gather around the corpses. Webb gives Burt the deeds taken from Wilson. Sarah has set herself free and arrives with a gun. Burt calms her, but still he arrests Webb for the murder of the judge, and cuffs him to take him to a judge in Canyon City. He gives back the star and answers vaguely to Sarah's question about when he will be back. At the junction to Canyon city he sets Webb free. The latter says, "You fooled me." Burt replies that he wanted half of the money rather than the land. They separate.

== Cast ==
- Klaus Kinski as James Webb, the lawyer
- Fred Robsahm as Burt Collins
- Antonio Cantafora as Ramon O'Hara
- Marina Rabissi as Sarah Collins (as Marina Mulligan)
- Enzo Pulcrano as Pedro O'Hara (as Paul Craine)
- Tiziana Dini as Consuela
- Calogero Caruana as Miguel O'Hara (as Ted Jones)
- Jerry Ross as Peter Collins, Burt's brother
- Dante Maggio as Judge Wilson (as Dan May)
- Claudio Trionfi
- Antonio Danesi as Ryan O'Hara (as Robert Dannish)
- Mimmo Maggio as Slide O'Hara (as Dick Foster)
- Carlo Croccolo as Deputy sheriff

== Reception ==
In his investigation of narrative structures in Spaghetti Western films, Fridlund writes that Black Killer displays many typical properties of a so-called "low-end" genre production. There are blatantly unmotivated exhibitions of female skin and conspicuous gaps in the plot. As another low-end characteristic, the scenes with the O'Haras were re-used in another film, Bounty Hunter in Trinity. However, by chance or by design, the story line does offer a subtle play on several variants of the partnership plot that was used in many Spaghetti Westerns following the success of For a Few Dollars More.
