= Death Rides Along =

1967 film

- Directed by: Giuseppe Vari
- Written by: Augusto Caminito; Fernando Di Leo; Adriano Bolzoni
- Cinematography: Amerigo Gengarelli
- Music by: Lallo Gori
- Release date: 1967
- Country: Italy
- Language: Italian

Death Rides Along (Italian: Con lui cavalca la morte) is a 1967 Italian Spaghetti Western film directed by Giuseppe Vari.

== Cast ==
- Mike Marshall: Bobby "Idaho" Kent
- Robert Hundar: Luke Prentiss
- Carole André: Susan
- Andrea Bosic: Bryan Talbot
- Hélène Chanel: Dolores Talbot
- Paolo Giusti: Kriss
- John McDouglas
- Peter Martell
