= The Night of the Damned =

- Italian film poster. Art by Renato Cesaro.
- Directed by: Filippo Ratti
- Screenplay by: Aldo Marcovecchio
- Story by: Aldo Marcovecchio
- Produced by: Niccola Addario; Lucio Carnemola; Gianni Solitaro
- Starring: Pierre Brice; Patrizia Viotti; Angela De Leo; Mario Carra
- Cinematography: Girolamo La Rosa
- Edited by: Rolando Salvatore
- Music by: Carlo Savina
- Production company: Primax
- Distributed by: Panta Cinematografica
- Release date: 10 September 1971 (Italy)
- Running time: 86 minutes
- Country: Italy
- Language: Italian

The Night of the Damned (Italian: La notte dei dannati) is a 1971 film directed by Filippo Ratti.

== Plot ==
The married couple Jean and Danielle Duprey receive a letter from a prince, an old friend of Jean's. The letter is in the form of a riddle, which references Les Fleurs du mal by Charles Baudelaire, which the prince gave him years ago. The Dupreys decide to leave and go to the prince's castle where Rita Lernod, the prince's wife, tells them that her husband is very ill. The prince appears to be afflicted with a disease unfamiliar to his doctors. The prince says that the disease affects everyone in his family for three generations, over thirty-five years of age. The couple finds a strange painting featuring someone dying at the stake, disturbing Danielle.

Danielle begins to have nightmares about dying at the stake. The prince tells Jean that the truth behind everything is in the library and gives him a ring. At night, the prince dies and the next day a girl is found dead, with large scratches on her chest. The police identifies her as a cousin of the prince, who had been seen the night before in Strasbourg, hundreds of miles from there. The following night, Jean finds a book in the library about black magic, which references the amethyst, like the ring the prince had given him. The book states that it is the most effective remedy against witches. Another death occurs in similar fashion to the girl, with the police identifying her as the sister of the first victim. Jean finds a card in the library, which is a copy of a public act of a sorcery process of 1650, against a certain Tarin Drole. Jean discovers that this is an anagram for Rita Lernod. In the deed, it is written that the President of the Tribunal was an ancestor of the prince. Jean begins to explore the castle further while Rita takes Danielle with her, giving her something to drink, but after Danielle sees a flame in her glass and runs off looking for Jean. The ghost of the prince and Danielle appears and is brought over to an altar to be sacrificed. Rita is about to slash her on the chest, when Jean throws Tarin's ashes on a fire to stop it, making Rita grow old, revealing herself to be a witch and dies. Jean and Rita find themselves outside and hear the explosion of the castle. The two return home, when another letter arrives from another prince but this time Danielle burns it.

== Production ==
Towards the end of the 1960s, director Filippo Ratti became involved with the short-lived production company Primax and directed two films written by Aldo Marcovecchio that were shot on the same sets: Erika and The Night of the Damned. The Night of the Damned went into production as Il castello dei Saint-Lambert. The film was shot in Ceri, Cerviteri and at Elios Studios in Rome.

The film's score by Carlo Savina is predominantly recycled from his music made for Malenka.

== Release ==
The Night of the Damned was initially released in Italy on 10 September 1971 where it was distributed by Panta Cinematografica. Compared to Erika which grossed 300 million Italian lire, The Night of the Demon grossed considerably less and by the time it had been sent to the board of censors in Italy, Primax had gone bankrupt. Film historian and critic Roberto Curti described the film's gross as "a modest sum" of 82,772,000 lire.

When the film was released in France as Les nuits sexuelles on April 23, 1975 which featured more explicit scenes such as one where females are tickled by naked handmaidens while lesbian and heterosexual couplings take place around them. At a screening in Genoa, a version described as the "nude version" was accidentally screened which led to the projectionist to apologize and offer refunds. This version was also English leading to most theatre goes not to understand the film.
