= Filippo Walter Ratti =

- Born: 13 June 1914; Rome, Lazio; Italy
- Died: 6 December 1981 (aged 67); Rome, Italy
- Other name: Peter Rush
- Occupations: Director; Screenwriter
- Years active: 1938–1977

Filippo Walter Ratti (1914–1981) was an Italian screenwriter and film director. After working as an assistant director for several years, he made his directoral debut in 1946. The following year he directed the biopic Eleonora Duse. In 1962 he directed Ten Italians for One German, a portrayal of the 1944 Ardeatine massacre in Rome.

== Selected filmography ==
=== Director ===
- Eleonora Duse (1947)
- The Black Mask (1952)
- It's Never Too Late (1953)
- Ten Italians for One German (1962)
- Erika (1971)
- La notte dei dannati (1971)
- Crazy Desires of a Murderer (1977)

== Bibliography ==
- Gordon, Robert. The Holocaust in Italian Culture, 1944–2010. Stanford University Press, 2012.
