= Lallo Gori =

Italian composer (1927–1982)

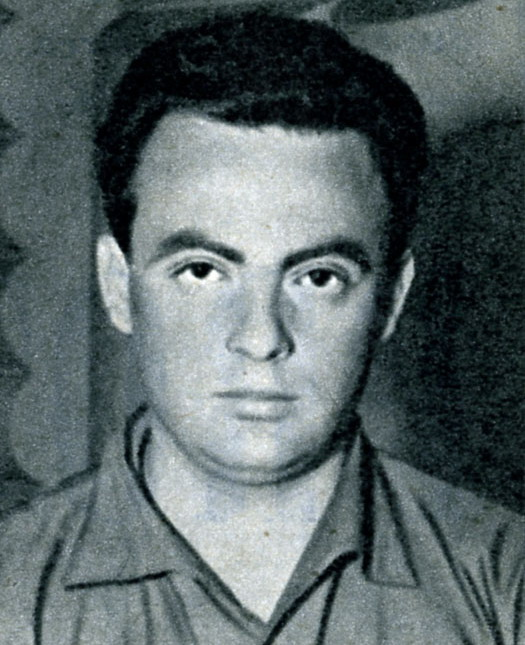
- Born: Coriolano Gori; 7 March 1927; Cervia, Ravenna
- Died: 1 December 1982 (aged 55); Roma

Lallo Gori (7 March 1927 – 1 December 1982) was an Italian composer and musician.

== Life and career ==
Born in Cervia, Ravenna as Coriolano Gori, Gori graduated in piano, harmony and composition at the Giuseppe Verdi Conservatory in Turin. He entered RAI as a member of its orchestra, then he became the musical director of its office in Rome.

Gori was best known as a composer of scores for films, and composed around 80 of them. These included several Spaghetti Westerns, poliziotteschis and thrillers, such as Primitive Love, Massacre Time, Dead Men Don't Make Shadows, Werewolf Woman and The Iron Commissioner. He also composed several pop songs, and three of them entered the competition at the Sanremo Music Festival.

== Selected filmography ==
- Tough Guys (1960)
- Le massaggiatrici (1962)
- Hercules Against the Sons of the Sun (1964)
- Primitive Love (1964)
- 002 Operation Moon (1966)
- How We Robbed the Bank of Italy (1966)
- Massacre Time (1966)
- Honeymoon, Italian Style (1966)
- Come rubammo la bomba atomica (1967)
- Il lungo, il corto, il gatto (1967)
- Poker with Pistols (1967)
- Death Rides Along (1967)
- Pecos Cleans Up (1967)
- The Handsome, the Ugly, and the Stupid (1967)
- The Two Crusaders (1968)
- Execution (1968)
- Black Jack (1968)
- Don Chisciotte and Sancio Panza (1968)
- Buckaroo: The Winchester Does Not Forgive (1968)
- The Avenger, Zorro (1969)
- Dead Men Don't Make Shadows (1970)
- Django and Sartana Are Coming... It's the End (1970)
- Scusi, Ma Lei Le Paga Le Tasse? (1971)
- A Barrel Full of Dollars (1971)
- Savage Guns (1971)
- A Fistful of Death (1971)
- Il clan dei due Borsalini (1971)
- A.A.A. Massaggiatrice Bella Presenza Offresi... (1972)
- Death Falls Lightly (1972)
- Tequila! (1973)
- The Sinful Nuns of Saint Valentine (1974)
- King Dick (1975)
- Calling All Police Cars (1975)
- The Language Teacher (1976)
- Werewolf Woman (1976)
- Return of the 38 Gang (1977)
- Could It Happen Here? (1977)
- The Criminals Attack, The Police Respond (1977)
- The Uranium Conspiracy (1978)
- The Iron Commissioner (1978)
