= Demofilo Fidani =

Italian film director (1914–1994)

- Born: 8 February 1914; Cagliari, Sardinia, Italy
- Died: 4 April 1994 (aged 80); Italy
- Occupation: Film director

Demofilo Fidani (born 8 February 1914 on a steamship bound for Cagliari; died 4 April 1994) was an Italian film director (24 films), set designer (more than 200 films), painter, and a regarded medium and author.

As director, Fidani specialized in spaghetti westerns and used many different pseudonyms including Miles Deem, Lucky Dickinson, Alex Demos, and Danilo Dani. Many of his films were westerns, in which he used the names of well-known characters such as Butch Cassidy, Macho Callahan, Django and Sartana, as well as titles that were variations of popular titles. Besides his westerns, he directed crime films, sex comedies, and, in 1972, a giallo called A.A.A. Masseuse, Good-Looking, Offers Her Services. Fidani's regular actors included Jack Betts (also known as Hunt Powers), Gordon Mitchell, Jeff Cameron and Klaus Kinski.

== Accolades ==
In 1977, Fidani received the gold medal for "Una vita per il cinema".

== Legacy ==
Fidani has been called "a sort of Italian Ed Wood" because of the extremely low budget of his spaghetti westerns as well as his bizarre characters and inattention to continuity.
