= 15 Scaffolds for a Murderer =

1968 film by Nunzio Malasomma

- Italian: 15 forche per un assassino
- Directed by: Nunzio Malasomma
- Screenplay by: José Luis de las Bayonas; Mario di Nardo
- Story by: Mario di Nardo
- Produced by: Lucio Bompiani; Enzo Nigro
- Starring: Craig Hill; Susy Andersen; Eleonora Brown; Howard Ross; George Martin
- Cinematography: Stelvio Massi
- Edited by: Antonietta Zita
- Music by: Francesco De Masi
- Production companies: Film Eos; Centauro Films
- Distributed by: Variety Distribution
- Release date: 15 December 1967 (Italy)
- Running time: 100 min
- Country: Italy

15 Scaffolds for a Murderer or The Dirty Fifteen (Italian: 15 forche per un assassino) is a 1967 action drama mystery Spaghetti Western film directed by Nunzio Malasomma, scored by Francesco De Masi, and starring Craig Hill, Andrea Bosic, George Martin and Margarita Lozano. It was the last film of Nunzio Malasomma, who died in 1974.

== Premise ==
The members of two rival gangs, led by Billy and Sandy, are accused of a terrible triple murder of three women, which they did not commit. Hunted by all the men in the village, they take refuge in an abandoned fort.

== Cast ==
- Craig Hill as Billy Mack
- Susy Andersen as Barbara Ferguson
- Aldo Sambrell as Danny / Bud Lee
- Andrea Bosic as Andrew Ferguson, the Pastor
- José Manuel Martín as Benny
- Ivan Giovanni Scratuglia
- Tomás Blanco as Clark Benett
- Umi Raho as Doctor
- L. Durant
- María Montez as Anne Cook
- Margarita Lozano as Mrs. Cook, the Widow
- Laura Redi
- Eleonora Brown as Liz Cook
- Howard Ross as Steve
- George Martin as Sandy Cassel
- José Canalejas as Tim, Mack's Blond Henchman
- Rafael Garcia as Manuel
- Francisco Nieto as Henry, Sandy's Henchman
- Enrique Santiago as Henry, Sandy's Henchman
- Ricardo Costa
- Frank Braña as Adam, Sandy's Henchman
- Antonio Casas
- Álvaro de Luna as Deputy Sheriff
- Jaime de Pedro
- José Luis Martín
- Antonio Molino Rojo as Sheriff
- Antonio Moreno
- Ricardo Palacios as Juan
- José Riesgo
- Aldo Berti
- Omero Capanna as Henchman
- José Terrón as Hangman
