= A Sky Full of Stars for a Roof =

1968 film

- Italian film poster
- Directed by: Giulio Petroni
- Screenplay by: Alberto Areal; Francesco Martino
- Produced by: Gianni Hecht Lucari
- Starring: Giuliano Gemma; Mario Adorf; Magda Konopka; Julie Menard
- Cinematography: Carlo Carlini
- Edited by: Enzo Alabiso
- Music by: Ennio Morricone
- Production company: Documento Film
- Distributed by: Euro International Film
- Release date: August 29, 1968 (Italy)
- Running time: 100 minutes
- Country: Italy
- Language: Italian

A Sky Full of Stars for a Roof (Italian: ...e per tetto un cielo di stelle) is a 1968 Italian Spaghetti Western comedy film.

It is the second western film directed by Giulio Petroni. At first the director was to be Franco Giraldi, but then he moved to direct A Minute to Pray, a Second to Die and Petroni replaced him. The film was generally praised for its opening sequence, that was defined by several critics as one of the best in the whole spaghetti western genre.

Scenes from this were used to create the film-within-the-film in Giuliano Montaldo's 1978 made for TV thriller Closed Circuit.

== Plot ==
Roger Pratt and his band stop a stagecoach and kill the driver and the passengers, including a priest and a young woman, but the man he expected is not there so he also shoots his informant. Tim, who in fact is that man, arrives later by horse to the scene and starts digging graves. Harry watches him, approaches and gives help, and then rides off without saying a word.

Later Tim sees Harry among gold miners in a saloon, losing at poker, and expose the games as crooked – but he refuses to draw against the gambler, showing that he carries no gun. There is a brawl and they are beaten out. Harry tells Tim he has gold that he has mined hidden in his underwear and the latter suggests that he deposits it in the bank at Pueblo city. Next day Tim and some accomplices manage to convince the gullible Harry that a shack in the deserted town of Pueblo city is a temporary bank office. When Harry loses his deposit slip and returns, all are gone.

Harry finds Tim at a market and attacks him. Tim says he has invested his share in the tent and water basin for a mermaid show. The upset Harry destroys the tent and basin and crying he tells Tim that he was to use the gold to buy cattle for a ranch that he inherited from his father. Tim promises to help him get the money back and leaves, waving to the "mermaid".

They try to make money running a fake telegraph service but have to escape from Pratt's gang, joining a funeral procession. Tim eyes the beautiful widow and tells Harry that the dead man was a famous bank robber and that he will make the widow tell where the loot is hidden. By pretending to be a close friend of the dead husband he gets invited in for food, and to keep out the anxious Harry, who keeps knocking at the window, he tells him that the loot is buried under a tree. At night Harry digs a deep hole while Tim gets the widow into bed. When Harry learns the truth from some passers-bye he breaks into the house and starts a fight and the widow runs out in her underwear calling for the sheriff.

In jail Harry has money for bail, and Tim convinces him to pay for both, because Harry will need help to escape from the Pratt gang, who they see arrive. At night they slip out, but the gang finds them sleeping and beats them, before stringing up Harry in a tree. Tim then jump kicks the man holding him at gunpoint, takes the gun and shoots off the rope, and kills the five men, though Pratt escapes. He tells Harry that he tries to avoid using a gun, as it is the same as a calling card for him. Harry sees that the men are all shot in the forehead and learns that Tim really is the gunfighter Billy Boy, who had a run-in with Pratt's father and killed two of Pratt's brothers who were sent against him.

They stop at a cantina and see a Wells Fargo wagon transporting gold from a mine. The waiter points out Frank Benton who is obsessed with the idea of robbing the wagon. Harry suggests that they join forces but Billy wants to avoid men with fixed ideas. He says that they shall paint a wagon like the Wells Fargo one and arrive to the mine earlier and pick up the gold – without any bloodshed. While Billy sleeps Harry goes with the plan to Benton and they paint the wagon and pick up the gold. However, when they get a military escort to town Benton shoots them, and is about to shoot the protesting Harry when Billy drops him with a bullet in his head. The two have to escape from the posse though, without any gold.

They find the inherited ranch being a run-down shack. They start repairing it, and Billy charms the hardware owner's wife into giving them credit while Harry "fishes" cups from the shelf with a rod. They have no cattle but some rabbits, which has been Billy's pet project earlier.

We see Pratt the older join with his son and a new gang. They attack the house but are driven back by Billy's fire. They besiege the house and send out men with dynamite. One gets up at the roof but falls through (at a place where we earlier have seen Harry fall). Billy lets part of the dynamite explode while they take cover and then lets the rest explode when the gang enters the house. Harry disappears in the explosion when he tries to save the rabbits. When Billy searches for Harry, Pratt the older gets the drop on him. When Roger approaches with his knife Billy walks aside to make him walk into a trap (who he earlier has said never caught the fox it was meant for) and he uses the opportunity to draw and shoot them. Harry now emerges. Billy says that the house can be rebuilt by Harry but that he will leave as he has only been bad luck. Harry, however, gets on his horse and accompanies him.

== Cast ==
- Giuliano Gemma as Billy Boy aka Tim Hawkins
- Mario Adorf as Harry
- Magda Konopka as Widow Dorothy McDonald
- Federico Boido as Roger Pratt (as Rick Boyd)
- Chris Huerta as Fat man in stagecoach
- Julie Menard as Sirene / Donna
- Anthony Dawson as Samuel Pratt
- Sandro Dori as Sirene's husband
- Franco Balducci as Brent
- John Bartha as Mr. Lawrence
- Víctor Israel as Innkeeper
- Benito Stefanelli as Pratt's henchman

== Reception ==
In his investigation of narrative structures in Spaghetti Western films, Fridlund writes that A Sky Full of Stars for a Roof presents a variant of the partnership plot that was used in many Spaghetti Westerns following the success of For a Few Dollars More, where the bounty killer partners both use cunning and manipulation not only against their prey but also against each other. Here the relationship is mainly in the comic mode, which means that the manipulations fail or backfire. Neither partner gets his objective(s) but they stay together forming a conjunctive partnership.
