= Rome Against Rome =

- Italian theatrical release poster
- Directed by: Giuseppe Vari
- Screenplay by: Ferruccio De Martino; Marcello Saratarelli
- Story by: Ferruccio De Martino; Massimo De Rita
- Starring: John Drew Barrymore; Susy Andersen; Ettore Manni; Ida Galli
- Cinematography: Gabor Pogany
- Music by: Roberto Nicolosi
- Production company: Galatea Film
- Distributed by: Cineriz
- Release date: 13 February 1964 (Italy)
- Running time: 98 minutes
- Country: Italy
- Language: Italian

Rome Against Rome (Italian: Roma contro Roma), also known as War of the Zombies, is a 1964 Italian peplum film directed by Giuseppe Vari.

== Synopsis ==
Roman centurion Gaius is dispatched to the fictional province of Salmacia to investigate the cessation of tributes to Rome. Upon arrival, Gaius discovers that the local authorities, including the pretern Lutetius and his duplicitous wife Tullia, have fallen under the influence of a cult dedicated to a Moon Goddess, led by the high priest Aderbad. This cult practices human sacrifices and has enslaved much of the local population. Gaius uncovers Aderbad's sinister plan to resurrect the spirits of fallen Roman soldiers to form an undead army aimed at conquering Rome. With the help of the enslaved girl Rhama, Gaius attempts to thwart Aderbad's scheme, leading to a climactic battle between the living and the spectral warriors.

== Cast ==
- John Drew Barrymore as Aderbad
- Susy Andersen as Tullio
- Ettore Manni as Gaius
- Ida Galli as Rhama
- Mino Doro as Lutetius
- Ivano Staccioli as Sirion
- Philippe Hersent as Azer
- Andrea Checchi

== Production ==
Director Vari filmed at CSC Studios. Rome Against Rome was the second last film by the production company Galatea studio and the film historian Tim Lucas described as representing the end of the peplum cycle as it was a "victim of the burgeoning "Spaghetti Western" movement".

== Release ==
Rome Against Rome was distributed theatrically in Italy by Cineriz on February 13, 1964. Lucas noted that the original English export print titled Rome Against Rome was dubbed under the direction of Tony Russel and that its soundtrack was "a chaotic mess". The film was cut for foreign release with its original 110 minute running cut to 97 minutes for its British release as Rome Against Rome and cut further on its American release for American International Pictures as War of the Zombies.

== Reception ==
In his book Italian Horror Film Directors, Louis Paul described the film as " a visually arresting and colorful but minor contribution to both the horror film genre and the heroic adventure sagas from which its origins sprung."
