= Teresa Gimpera =

Spanish actress (1936–2024)

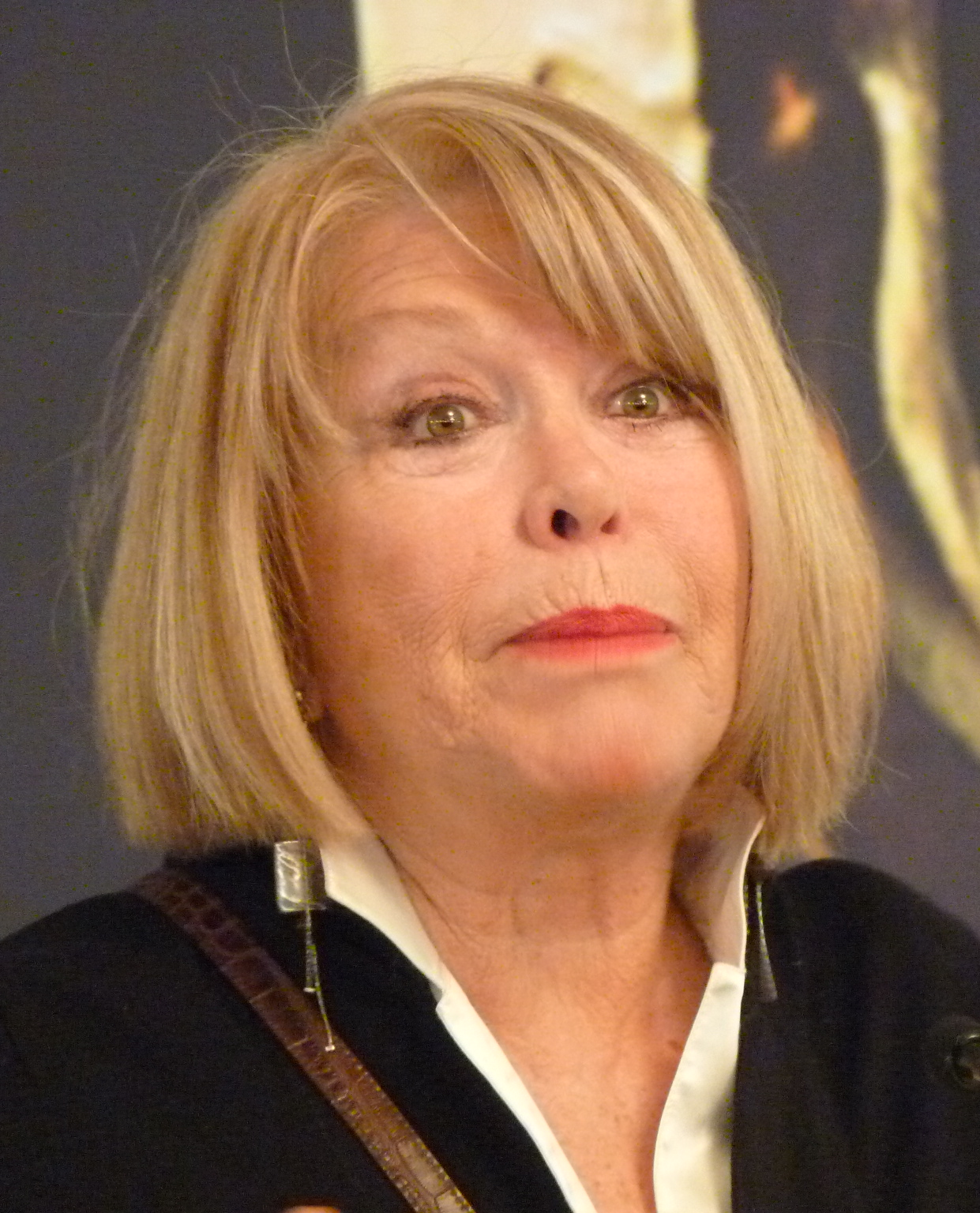
- Gimpera in 2012
- Born: Teresa Gimpera Flaquer; 21 September 1936; Igualada, Spain
- Died: 23 July 2024 (aged 87); Barcelona, Spain
- Occupation: Actress
- Years active: 1963–2024
- Spouse(s): Octavio Sarsanedas (divorced) Craig Hill (m. 1990; died 2014)
- Children: 3

Teresa Gimpera i Flaquer (Catalan pronunciation: [təˈɾɛzə ʒimˈpeɾə]; 21 September 1936 – 23 July 2024) was a Spanish film and television actress and model of the 1960s and 1970s.

== Biography ==
Teresa Gimpera Flaquer was born in Igualada, province of Barcelona, on 21 September 1936. Her parents were both teachers, and grew up in the Sant Andreu neighbourhood of Barcelona.

Her first job was with Leopoldo Pomés as an advertisement model. She later made her film debut in Fata Morgana (1965). She went on to star in numerous films throughout the 1960s and 1970s.

She married Octavio Sarsanedas, who worked in advertising at the Seix Barral publishing house. They had three children, Marc, Job, and Joan.

In 1990, she married U.S. actor Craig Hill; he had moved to Barcelona, Spain where he had found work in Spaghetti Westerns. They were married for 24 years until Hill's death in April 2014.

Gimpera died in Barcelona on 23 July 2024, at the age of 87 from a cancer.

== Selected filmography ==
- Lucky, the Inscrutable (1966)
- Black Box Affair (1966)
- Wanted (1967)
- Tuset Street (1968)
- El extraño caso del doctor Fausto (1969)
- Eagles Over London (1969)
- The Exquisite Cadaver (1969)
- Macabre (1969)
- Twenty Thousand Dollars for Seven (1969)
- The Legend of Frenchie King (1971)
- The Rebellious Novice (1971)
- Naked Girl Killed in the Park (1972)
- The Night of the Devils (1972)
- Hannah, Queen of the Vampires (1973)
- The Spirit of the Beehive (1973)
- Those Dirty Dogs (1973)
- El vicio y la virtud (1975)
- English Striptease (1975)
- Course Completed (1987)
- The Long Winter (1992)

== Bibliography ==
- Mira, Alberto. The Cinema of Spain and Portugal. Wallflower Press, 2005.
