= I Want Him Dead =

1968 film

- Film poster
- Directed by: Paolo Bianchini
- Written by: Carlos Sarabia
- Starring: Craig Hill; Lea Massari
- Cinematography: Ricardo Andreu
- Edited by: Eugenio Alabiso
- Music by: Nico Fidenco
- Production companies: Centauro Films; Inducine; Rewind Film
- Distributed by: Adria Filmverleih; Europrodis; Magna-Filmi; C. de Distribución Coop. de Distribuc.; Icestorm Entertainment; Koch Media; New Gold Entertainment; Ocean Filmes; Poletel
- Release date: 15 June 1968 (Italy)
- Running time: 82 min
- Countries: Italy; Spain
- Language: Italian

I Want Him Dead (Italian: Lo voglio morto, Spanish: Lo quiero muerto) is a 1968 Italian-Spanish Spaghetti Western film directed by Paolo Bianchini and starring Craig Hill.

== Plot ==
After Clayton's (Craig Hill) sister is raped and killed, and the sheriff tries to kill him, he looks for revenge in any way possible, which involves assassinating two generals so he can prolong the Civil War.

== Cast ==
- Craig Hill as Clayton
- Lea Massari as Aloma
- José Manuel Martín as Jack Blood
- Andrea Bosic as Mallek
- Licia Calderón as Marisol
- Cristina Businari as Mercedes
- Andrea Scotti as Harry Gunn
- Rich Boyd as Steve
- Francisco Braña as Berger
- Remo De Angelis as Sheriff
- José Canalejas as Confederate soldier
- Francisco Nieto as deserter
- José Riesgo as Mark
- Renato Chiantoni as Duke Newton
- Tomás Blanco as Mac
- Rafael Albaicín as bartender
- José Terrón as Logan, Cowboy Drinking at Saloon
