= Cristina Businari =

Italian model

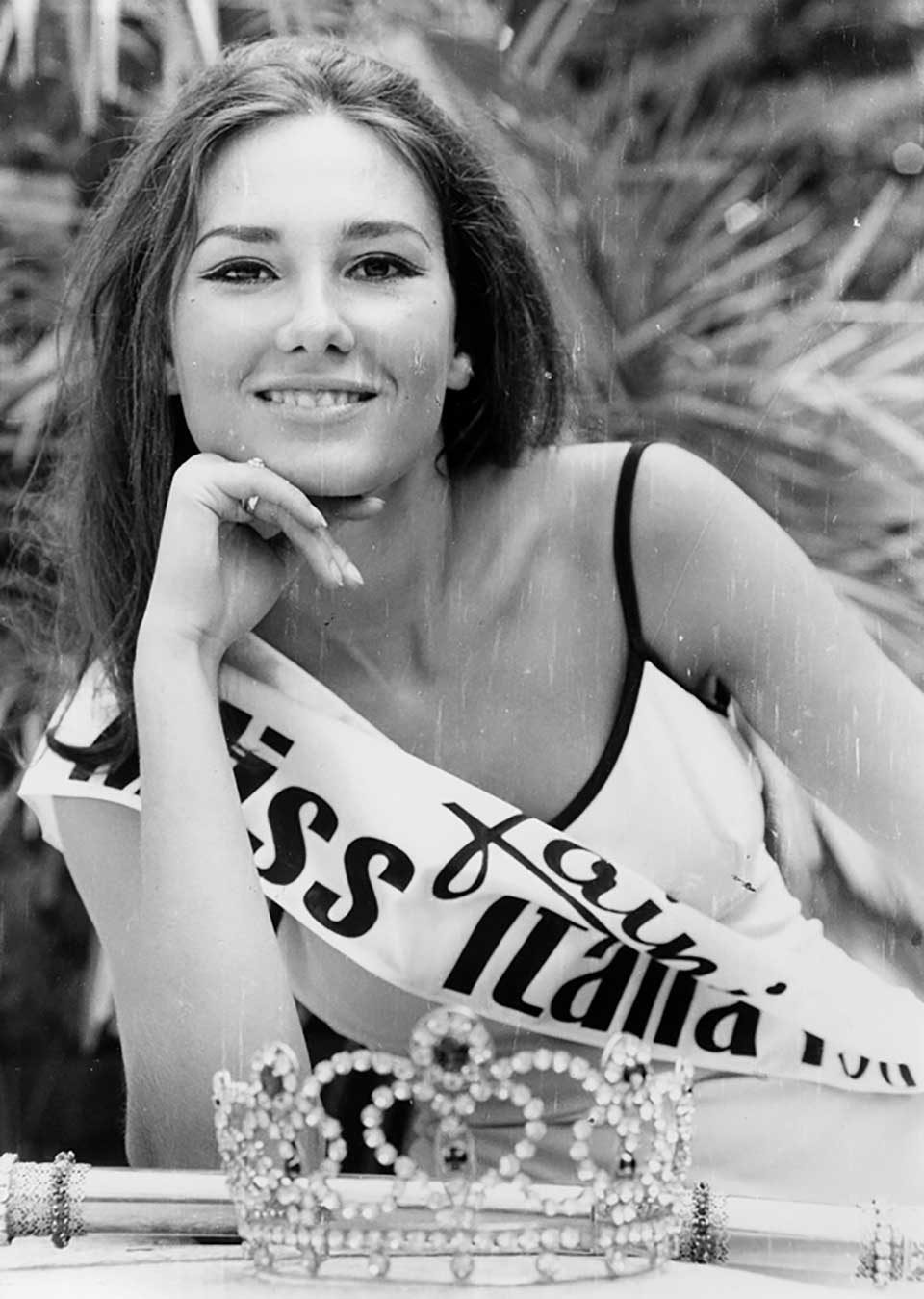
- Cristina Businari in 1967
- Born: 10 October 1949 (age 76); Rome, Italy
- Occupations: Actress, publicist and model
- Height: 168 cm (5 ft 6 in)
- Beauty pageant titleholder
- Title: Miss Italia 1967
- Major competitions: Miss Italia 1967 (Winner); Miss World 1967 (Unplaced)

Cristina Businari (born 10 October 1949) is an Italian actress, publicist, model and beauty pageant titleholder.

She won Miss Italia 1967 and represented Italy at Miss World 1967. She played Mercedes along Craig Hill in I Want Him Dead (1968), by Paolo Bianchini, and Gianna in I ragazzi della Roma violenta (1976), by Renato Savino.

== Filmography ==
- I racconti fantastici di Edgar Allan Poe (1979) as Myrna
- The Children of Violent Rome (1976) as Gianna
- Der gestohlene Himmel (1974)
- I Want Him Dead (1968) as Mercedes
