= Anthony Dawson =

Scottish actor (1916–1992)

- Dawson as Professor Dent in Dr. No (1962)
- Born: Anthony Douglas Gillon Dawson; 18 October 1916; Edinburgh, Scotland
- Died: 8 January 1992 (aged 75); Lewes, England
- Education: Royal Academy of Dramatic Art
- Occupation: Actor
- Years active: 1940–1991
- Spouse: Carol Leila Filby (m. 1956)

Anthony Douglas Gillon Dawson (18 October 1916 – 8 January 1992) was a Scottish actor, best known for his supporting roles as villains in films such as Alfred Hitchcock's Dial M for Murder (1954) and Midnight Lace (1960), and playing Professor Dent in the James Bond film Dr. No (1962). He also appeared as Ernst Stavro Blofeld in From Russia with Love (1963) and Thunderball (1965).

== Early life and education ==
Dawson was born in Edinburgh, the son of Ida Violet (nee Kittel) and Eric Francis Dawson. He trained at the Royal Academy of Dramatic Art, and served in the British Army during World War II.

== Career ==
Dawson made his film debut in 1943's They Met in the Dark. He went on to appear in such classic British films as The Way to the Stars (1945), The Queen of Spades (1948) and The Wooden Horse (1950), before moving to America in the early 1950s.

It was while there that he appeared on Broadway in the play, and then the subsequent Alfred Hitchcock film of Dial M for Murder (1954), playing C. A. Swann/Captain Lesgate. In the film, he is blackmailed by Tony Wendice (Ray Milland) into murdering his wife Margot (Grace Kelly). In his unpublished memoirs, Rambling Recollections, Dawson reminisced about getting the part:

... I had never met Hitchcock before, and yet he was about to do me the most fantastic good turn I could imagine. In that wonderful fat man's Cockney voice, he said, slowly, drooping every word separately, as though he had all day: 'Tony, I just called to let you know that I want you for this picture, so you're quite safe to make yourself a nice deal.' What could I say? I mumbled my thanks and put the phone down, feeling rather dazed, electrified, stunned; all of these. The full impact of this call from Hitch was very soon to come home to me.

In 1956, he appeared in an episode of the TV series The Buccaneers 'The Hand of the Hawk', starring Robert Shaw. On his return to United Kingdom he had two other memorable roles, including the evil Marques Siniestro in Hammer's The Curse of the Werewolf (1961) and henchman Professor Dent in the first James Bond film, Dr. No (1962).

Throughout his career he could often be found in the films of director Terence Young, including the aforementioned Dr. No, They Were Not Divided (1950), Valley of Eagles (1951), The Amorous Adventures of Moll Flanders (1965), Triple Cross (1966), Red Sun (1971), Inchon (1982) and The Jigsaw Man (1983). Young also cast him as the physical presence of Ernst Stavro Blofeld in his Bond films From Russia with Love (1963) and Thunderball (1965), stroking the ubiquitous white cat. His face was never seen, however, and Blofeld's voice was provided by Eric Pohlmann. Dawson appeared alongside fellow Bond veterans Adolfo Celi, Lois Maxwell and Bernard Lee in the Italian Bond knockoff O.K. Connery.

After the 1960s, his roles got progressively smaller. He moved to Rome in the latter part of the decade, appearing primarily in Italian films. He had roles in several Spaghetti Westerns, including Death Rides a Horse with Lee Van Cleef and John Phillip Law, and A Sky Full of Stars for a Roof with Giuliano Gemma. He played Nazi official Wilhelm Harster in Massacre in Rome, a controversial drama about the Ardeatine massacre during World War II. One of his last roles was as a Priest in the cult horror comedy Ghoulies II.

Dawson was unconnected with the Italian film director Antonio Margheriti, who used the pseudonym Anthony M. Dawson, causing occasional confusion between the two.

== Personal life ==
Dawson married Carol Leila Filby in 1956.

=== Death ===
Dawson died in Lewes, East Sussex of cancer at the age of 75 on 8 January 1992.

== Partial filmography ==
- Charley's (Big-Hearted) Aunt (1940) – Student (uncredited)
- They Met in the Dark (1943) – 2nd Code Expert
- The Way to the Stars (1945) – Bertie Steen
- Beware of Pity (1946) – Lieutenant Blannik
- School for Secrets (1946) – Flight Lieutenant Norton
- The Queen of Spades (1949) – Fyodor
- They Were Not Divided (1950) – Michael
- The Wooden Horse (1950) – Pomfret
- The Woman in Question (1950) – Inspector Wilson (uncredited)
- I'll Get You for This (1951) – Secret Agent (uncredited)
- The Long Dark Hall (1951) – The Man
- Valley of Eagles (1951) – Sven Nyström
- Dial M for Murder (1954) – C. J. Swann / Captain Lesgate
- That Lady (1955) – Don Inigo
- The Buccaneers (1956) – Captain Flask (1 episode)
- The Adventures of Robin Hood (TV series) (1956) – Episode: Blackmail
- Hour of Decision (1957) – Gary Bax
- Alfred Hitchcock Presents (1957) – Season 2, episodes 25–27: "I Killed the Count Part 1", "I Killed the Count Part 2", "I Killed the Count Part 3" – Count Victor Mattoni
- Action of the Tiger (1957) – Security Officer
- The Haunted Strangler (1958) – Superintendent Burk
- Tiger Bay (1959) – Barclay
- Libel (1959) – Gerald Loddon
- Midnight Lace (1960) – Roy Ash
- Offbeat (1961) – James Dawson
- The Curse of the Werewolf (1961) – The Marques Siniestro
- Dr. No (1962) – Professor R.J. Dent
- Seven Seas to Calais (1962) – Lord Burleigh
- From Russia with Love (1963) – Ernst Stavro Blofeld (body only, credited as ?)
- The Yellow Rolls-Royce (1964) – Mickey (uncredited)
- Change Partners (1965) – Ben Arkwright
- The Amorous Adventures of Moll Flanders (1965) – Officer of Dragoons
- Thunderball (1965) – Ernst Stavro Blofeld (body only, uncredited)
- Triple Cross (1966) – Major Stillman
- Kaleidoscope (1966) – Tony Anderson (uncredited)
- Death Rides a Horse (1967) – Burt Cavanaugh
- Your Turn to Die (1967) – Dr. Evans
- Dirty Heroes (1967) – American Colonel
- Operation Kid Brother (1967) – Alpha
- The Rover (1967) – Captain Vincent
- Hell Is Empty (1967) – Paul Grant
- A Sky Full of Stars for a Roof (1968) – Samuel Pratt
- Battle of Neretva (1969) – General Morelli
- Rosolino Paternò, soldato... (1970) – Italian General
- Deadlock (1970) – Anthony Sunshine
- Red Sun (1971) – Hyatt
- The Valachi Papers (1972) – Federal Investigator
- The Big Game (1973) – Burton (uncredited)
- Massacre in Rome (1973) – Wilhelm Harster
- The Count of Monte Cristo (1975) – Noirtier De Villefort
- Inchon (1981) – General Collins
- The Jigsaw Man (1983) – Vicar
- Where is Parsifal (1984) – Ripple
- Pirates (1986) – Spanish Officer
- Ghoulies II (1988) – Priest
- Run for Your Life (1988) – Colonel Moorcroft
- The Gamblers (1990) – Roy

== Partial stage credits ==
- Landslide (1943, Westminster Theatre, London and Theatre Royal, Brighton)
- Crisis in Heaven (1944, UK tour)
- Dial M for Murder (1952-53, Plymouth Theatre, New York)
- Be My Guest (1957-58, UK tour)
