= The Temptress (1951 film) =

- Directed by: Antonio Leonviola
- Written by: Maurizio Corgnati; Daniele D'Anza; Silvio Giovaninetti; Antonio Leonviola
- Produced by: Stefano Caretta; Franco Villani
- Starring: Anna Maria Ferrero; Michel Auclair; Michel Simon
- Cinematography: Enzo Serafin
- Edited by: Rolando Benedetti
- Music by: Bruno Maderna
- Production companies: Villani Film; Caretta Film
- Distributed by: Paramount Films (Italy)
- Release date: 1951
- Running time: 94 minutes
- Countries: France; Italy
- Language: Italian

The Temptress (Italian: Le Due verità) is a 1951 crime-melodrama film directed by Antonio Leonviola and starring Anna Maria Ferrero, Michel Auclair and Michel Simon.

The film's sets were designed by Luigi Scaccianoce.

== Cast ==
- Anna Maria Ferrero as Maria-Luce Carlinet
- Michel Auclair as Lut Loris
- Michel Simon as Cidoni
- Valentine Tessier as Madame Muk
- Ruggero Ruggeri as Presidente tribunale
- Giulio Stival as Procuratore generale
- Mario Pisu
- Lucia Bosé
- Flora Torrigiani
- Enzo Furlai
- Gino Rossi
- Lilly Drago
- Clara Ferrero
- Carla Arrigoni
- Vittorio Manfrino

== Sources ==
- Bayman, Louis. The Operatic and the Everyday in Postwar Italian Film Melodrama. Edinburgh University Press, 2014.
