= The Gentlemen (1965 film) =

1965 film

- Directed by: Rolf Thiele; Alfred Weidenmann; Franz Seitz
- Written by: Paul Hengge; Kurt Heuser; Joe Lederer; Gregor von Rezzori; Franz Seitz
- Based on: Die Herren (novel) by Angelika Schrobsdorff
- Produced by: Franz Seitz
- Starring: Paul Hubschmid; Mario Adorf; Susy Andersen
- Cinematography: Wolf Wirth
- Edited by: Alexandra Anatra
- Music by: Bernd Kampka
- Production company: Franz Seitz Filmproduktion
- Distributed by: Nora-Filmverleih
- Release date: 25 August 1965
- Running time: 110 minutes
- Country: West Germany
- Language: German

The Gentlemen (German: Die Herren) is a 1965 West German comedy-drama film directed by Franz Seitz, Rolf Thiele and Alfred Weidenmann and starring Paul Hubschmid, Mario Adorf, and Susy Andersen. The film was shot at the Wandsbek Studios in Hamburg. The film's sets were designed by the art director Robert Stratil.

== Plot ==
The focus of the plot is the young journalist Evelyne. The young lady already has a multi-faceted past and has gotten to know quite a few men – from simple boys to extremely wealthy manufacturers. Bored with her job, at the suggestion of a dynamic publisher named Blech, whom she meets at a conference of writers and intellectuals in Travemünde, she begins to write down her amorous adventures of the past, hoping to create a raunchy literary sensation. She also ends up in bed with Blech. She becomes pregnant by him, but Blech leaves her. In the following episodes, Evelyne looks back on her life and reviews her affairs.

Early on, Evelyne shows herself to be a precocious fruit when she flirts with the slightly older farm boy Boris during a wedding in the country. As a young woman, she begins an affair with a much older colonel in the US occupying army. This love affair also falls apart, and Evelyne ends up in the arms of a jaded young aristocrat, a veritable count. But this affair also has no future, and so the blonde siren finally flees into the arms and bed of the staid Swiss watch manufacturer Pflügeli. Although he is willing and a true gentleman, his sexual virility leaves much to be desired.

== Cast ==
- Paul Hubschmid as Pflügeli

...and, in alphabetical order:

- Mario Adorf as Verleger Blech, episode 'Die Intellektuellen'
- Susy Andersen as Eveline, episodes 'Die Bauern', 'Die Intellektuellen'
- Balduin Baas as Meyberg
- Ulrich Beiger as Grischa, episode 'Die Bauern'
- Bruno Dietrich as Boris, episode 'Die Bauern'
- Astrid Frank as Das Mädchen Eveline
- Benno Hoffmann
- Robert Hoffmann
- Herbert Hübner as Graf, episode 'Die Intellektuellen'
- Letícia Román as Evelines, episodes 'Die Intellektuellen', 'Die Soldaten'
- Peter van Eyck as Colonel, episode 'Die Soldaten'
- Gregor von Rezzori as Onkel Grischa
- Friedrich von Thun as Graf, episode 'Die Intellektuellen'
- Adelin Wagner as Claudia
- Fred Williams
