= Life Is Tough, Eh Providence? =

- Directed by: Giulio Petroni
- Cinematography: Sandro D'Eva
- Edited by: Nino Baragli
- Music by: Ennio Morricone
- Release date: 26 October 1972
- Language: Italian

Life Is Tough, Eh Providence? (Italian: La vita a volte è molto dura, vero Provvidenza?, also known as Sometimes Life Is Hard - Right, Providence?) is a 1972 Italian-Spanish Spaghetti Western comedy film directed by Giulio Petroni. The film was a box office success and generated an immediate sequel, Here We Go Again, Eh Providence? (Ci risiamo, vero Provvidenza?).

== Cast ==
- Tomas Milian: Provvidenza
- Gregg Palmer: Hurricane Kid Smith
- Janet Agren: Stella
- Dieter Eppler: Sheriff Howard Pendleton
- Maurice Poli: Sheriff von Keensburg
- Giovanni Cianfriglia: The Challenger (credited as Ken Wood)
- Paul Muller: Mr. Summitt
- Mike Bongiorno: Mike Goodmorning
- Gabriella Giorgelli: Sister
- Horst Janson: Sheriff of the village
