= The Appointment (1969 film) =

1969 film by Sidney Lumet

- Theatrical release poster
- Directed by: Sidney Lumet
- Written by: James Salter
- Story by: Antonio Leonviola
- Produced by: Martin Poll
- Starring: Omar Sharif; Anouk Aimée
- Cinematography: Carlo Di Palma
- Edited by: Thelma Connell
- Music by: John Barry; Don Walker
- Distributed by: Metro-Goldwyn-Mayer
- Release dates: May 1969 (Cannes Film Festival); July 18, 1969 (Finland); August 15, 1970 (Sweden)
- Running time: 115 minutes
- Country: United States
- Language: English

The Appointment is a 1969 psychological drama film directed by Sidney Lumet and starring Omar Sharif and Anouk Aimée. Written by James Salter, it is based on the story by Antonio Leonviola.

== Plot ==
After becoming involved with the ex-fiancée of a business acquaintance, lawyer Frederico Fendi (Omar Sharif) becomes consumed with suspicion that his new wife Carla (Anouk Aimée) may be moonlighting as a high-class prostitute. His attempts to entrap her lead to disaster.

== Cast ==
Actor	Role
Omar Sharif	Frederico Fendi
Anouk Aimée	Carla
Lotte Lenya	Emma Valadier
Didi Perego	Nani de Marchis
Fausto Tozzi	Renzo
Gigi Proietti	Fabre
Paola Barbara	Mother
Ennio Balbo	Ugo Perino
Inna Alexeieff	Old Woman on Train
Isa Stoppi	

== Production ==
The Appointment has three original scores. Michel Legrand composed the film's first score. That score contained only a single theme, with variations, and was ultimately rejected. A replacement score was composed by John Barry, which was used in the film's theatrical release. Barry's score also contained a single theme with variations, with the exception of select location scenes. The film had a very limited release in the United States, and when the rights were purchased for U.S. television airing by CBS, MGM re-edited the film and commissioned an entirely new score by Stu Phillips. Selections from all three scores were finally released on CD in 2003 by Film Score Monthly.

== Critical reception ==
In his review in Variety, Robert Hawkins described the film as "a flimsy love story which never really catches fire." Hawkins also stated that "flat writing and an over-rigid performance by Sharif in a crucial role, which at times skirts the laughable, seriously flaw what might otherwise have been an intriguing love tale cum suspenser."

=== Awards and nominations ===
The Appointment was nominated for the Palme d'Or (Golden Palm) at the 1969 Cannes Film Festival. The prize was instead awarded to the British black comedy If.... (1968).

== See also ==
- List of American films of 1969
