= Antonio Leonviola =

Italian screenwriter and film director

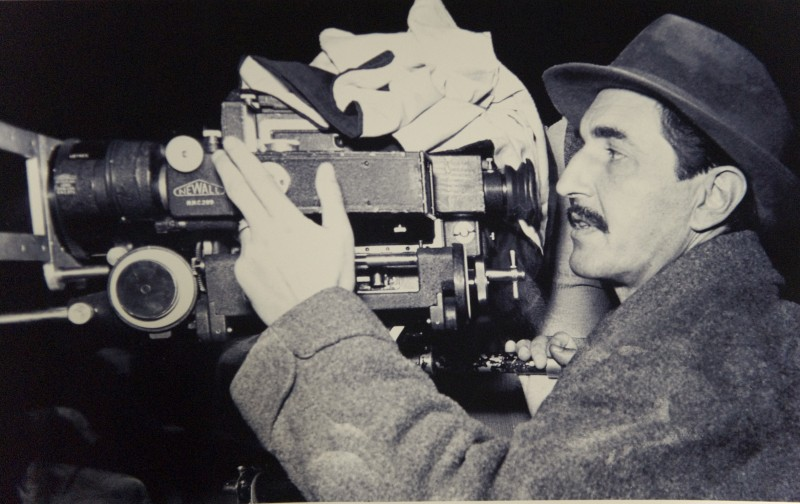
- Born: Antonio Leone Viola; 13 May 1913; Montagnana, Veneto, Italy
- Died: 4 August 1995 (aged 82); Rome, Lazio, Italy
- Occupations: Screenwriter; Film director
- Years active: 1934-1975

Antonio Leonviola, sometimes Leon Viola (13 May 1913 – 4 August 1995), was an Italian screenwriter and film director and co-founder of the "Libera Università del Cinema di Roma".

== Life and career ==
Leonviola was born in 1913 in Montagnana as Antonio Leone Viola. In 1934, he won a gold medal at the Venice Film Festival for his silent film Fiera di tipi, which he shot at a fair in Padua. He worked as war photographer during World War II, an experience that he reflected in a few short films including La battaglia dell'Amba Alagi and La marcia degli eroi.

After the war, Leonviola worked as a screenwriter in a number of adventure films and in 1942 directed his first feature film, Rita da Cascia. After a long break, he returned as director in 1951 with a crime film, The Temptress, which was celebrated by critics.

The success did not hold, and his next films were all more or less battered by the critics. There followed the costume film Sul ponte dei sospiri, Noi cannibali (a story of social discrimination), a remake of his earlier Rita da Cascia entitled Il suo amore più grande, and Angel in a Taxi.

Human Torpedoes, a war film credited to Leonviola, was for the large part directed by Carlo Lizzani, who, however, did not want his name in the credits.

In 1961, Leonviola switched to mythological peplum, directing Atlas in the Land of the Cyclops (starring Gordon Mitchell) followed by Mole Men Against the Son of Hercules (starring Mark Forest) the same year. Two years later, in 1963, Leonviola directed another two peplum films both starring Joe Robinson as "Taur" (in the English version: "Thor", in the German: "Taurus"): Thor and the Amazon Women and Taur, il re della forza bruta. Finally, in 1967, after a break of 4 years, Leonviola returned one last time to direct the caper film I giovani tigri starring Helmut Berger.

Leonviola continued to work as screenwriter. In 1968, his novel La virtù sdraiata was published under his jumbled birth name "Leone Antonio Viola". It was adapted for Sidney Lumet's film The Appointment (1969).

He was married to director, screenwriter and artist Sofia Scandurra, with whom he founded the "Libera Università del Cinema di Roma" for actors and directors in San Cesareo in 1983. Further co-founders were Cesare Zavattini and Alessandro Blasetti.

Leonviola died on 4 August 1995.

== Selected filmography ==
=== Screenwriter ===
- Hurricane in the Tropics (1939)
- The Son of the Red Corsair (1943)
- Rita of Cascia (1943)
- For You I Have Sinned (1953)
- The Appointment (1969)
- Unknown Woman (1969)

=== Director ===
- Fiera di tipi (1934)
- Rita da Cascia (1942)
- The Temptress (1952)
- Human Torpedoes (1954)
- Angel in a Taxi (1958)
- Atlas in the Land of the Cyclops (1961)
- Mole Men Against the Son of Hercules (1961)
- Maciste nella terra dei Ciclopi (Maciste kauhujen maassa) (1961)
- Maciste, l’uomo più forte del mondo (Maciste ja manalan valtiatar) (1961)
- Thor and the Amazon Women (1963)

== Bibliography ==
- Barattoni, Luca (2012). Italian Post-neorealist Cinema. Edinburgh University Press.
- Giordano, Michele (1998). Giganti buoni: da Ercole a Piedone (e oltre) il mito dell'uomo forte nel cinema italiano. Gremese Editore.
- Poppi, Roberto (2002). I registi: dal 1930 ai giorni nostri. Gremese Editore.
