= Thor and the Amazon Women =

Thor and the Amazon Women (also released as "Women Gladiators")
- Directed by: Antonio Leonviola
- Written by: Antonio Leonviola, Fabio Piccioni and Sofia Scandurra (story and screenplay)
- Produced by: Ennio De Concini (producer); Alfredo Guarini (producer); Livio Maffei (executive producer)
- Starring: See below
- Cinematography: Guglielmo Mancori
- Edited by: Renato Cinquini
- Music by: Roberto Nicolosi
- Distributed by: Galatea S.P.A.
- Release date: 1963
- Running time: 90 minutes (United Kingdom); 84 minutes (US); 95 minutes (Director's cut)
- Countries: Italy; Yugoslavia
- Languages: English; Italian

Thor and the Amazon Women (Italian: Le gladiatrici, lit. "The female gladiators") is a 1963 Italian / Yugoslavian sword and sandal film directed by Antonio Leonviola. The film is also known as The Amazon Women (United Kingdom censored version) and Women Gladiators in the United Kingdom. It is a sequel to "Taur the Mighty" (released in Italy as "Taur, il re della forza bruta").

== Plot summary ==
A civilization of women warriors is ruled by the evil Black Queen who has subjugated the men in her land.

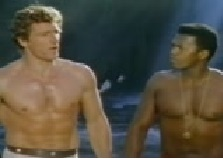
Actors Joe Robinson (left) as Thor and Harry Baird (right) as Ubaratutu

Thor and his friend Ubaratutu live in a distant village with a young blonde woman named Tamar and her young brother Homolke. Tamar's father was the king of a seaside village who had been killed several years earlier when the Black Queen's Amazon warriors raided the village.

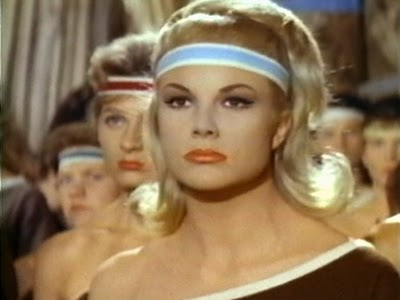
Susy Andersen as Tamar

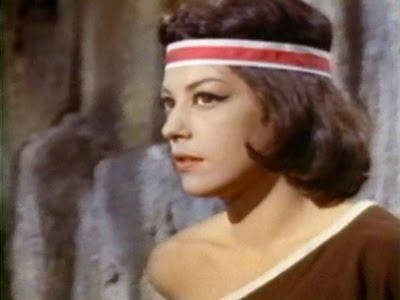
Carla Foscari as Ghebel Gor

As a form of entertainment, the Black Queen enslaves captive women and forces them to fight each other. Women who refuse to fight are executed by the Evil Queen's guards. Ghebel Gor, one of the enslaved women, tells the queen about Thor and his reputation as a strongman. Aware of a legend that a strongman may cause her downfall, the queen sends her amazon warriors to abduct Thor. They fail as Thor manages to escape their trap, but instead they capture Tamar and her brother. Subsequently, Tamar is sent to gladiator school and is trained to fight other women. During the training, Ghebel Gor tells Tamar that she hopes to never fight her because of the Tamar's superior strength as well as a skills on the battlefield.

While Tamar trains, her brother manages to escape and returns home where he alerts both Thor and Ubaratutu and then brings them back to the queen's village with the intent of freeing Tamar and the enslaved men. Concurrently, Yamad, the "captain general" of the amazon warriors confides to Tamar that she secretly opposes the queen. Their conversation is overheard by Ghebel Gor who informs the queen. The captain general is subsequently executed and the queen orders Tamar and Ghebel Gor to fight to the death. Although the queen gives Ghebel Gor her choice of weapons, she loses her weapon during the fight and is forced to battle her blonde opponent with her bare hands. As they fight, Thor and Ubaratutu lead a rebellion of the enslaved men. As the rebellion spreads, Tamar kills Ghebel Gor. The Black Queen, attempting to flee, is also killed and her amazon army surrenders. Tamar, although wounded, recovers and installs her young brother on the throne as king.

== Cast ==
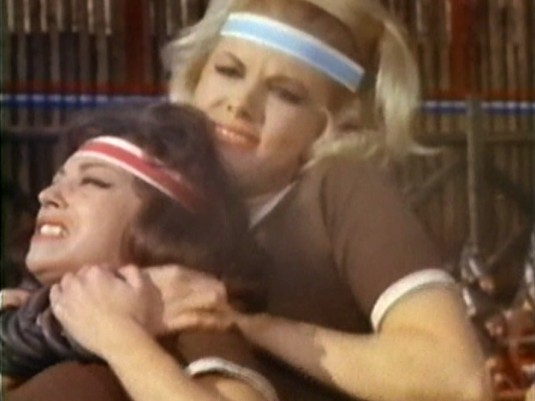
Tamar defeats Ghebel Gor in the movie's climactic fight scene

- Susy Andersen as Tamar
- Joe Robinson as Thor
- Harry Baird as Ubaratutu
- Carla Foscari as Ghebel Gor
- Janine Hendy as The Black Queen
- Maria Fiore as Yamad
- Alberto Cevenini as Siros
- Tony Ante
- Robert Baca
- Anna Majurec
- Claudia Capone as Agarit

== Production ==
Thor and the Amazon Women was filmed on location in the Postojna Caves in Slovenia. The set appeared to be very cold since water vapor could be seen coming from the mouths of the actresses in many of the scenes. Despite the apparently cold temperatures, the female Amazons were scantily dressed in all of the film's scenes.

== Reviews ==
Thor and the Amazon Women has been called "... about as bad as they come." The film's unflattering portrayal of black people and women has been criticized as racially insensitive and anti-feminist. The movie has also been ridiculed for its excessive use of lipstick and blue eye shadow, despite its ancient setting.

The Video Hound reviewer gave the film one star out of five.

== Bibliography ==
- Hughes, Howard (2011). Cinema Italiano - The Complete Guide From Classics To Cult. London - New York: I.B.Tauris. ISBN 978-1-84885-608-0.
