= Bury Them Deep =

1968 film by Paolo Moffa

- Directed by: Paolo Moffa
- Written by: Paolo Moffa; Enzo Dell'Aquila
- Starring: Craig Hill
- Cinematography: Franco Villa
- Music by: Nico Fidenco
- Release date: 1968
- Country: Italy
- Language: English

Bury Them Deep (Italian: All'ultimo sangue), also known as To the Last Drops of Blood, is a 1968 Italian Spaghetti Western film written and directed by Paolo Moffa and starring Craig Hill.

== Synopsis ==
Billy, also known as "The Gunslinger," stole a payment book from the American Army. They enlist Clive Norton to retrieve the money. To aid him, Norton saves a man from the gallows who harbors disdain for Billy and his brother, El Chaleco.

== Cast ==
- Craig Hill as Clive Norton
- Ettore Manni as El Chaleco
- Ken Wood as Billy Gunn
- José Greci as Consuelo/Pepita
- Francesco Santovetti as Cordero
- Luciano Doria as Colonel
- Alberto Bucchi as Sheriff
- Antonio Danesi as Gunns Leutnant
