= Gangster's Law =

1969 film

- Film poster
- Directed by: Siro Marcellini
- Screenplay by: Piero Regnoli; Siro Marcellini
- Story by: Siro Marcellini
- Produced by: Roberto Loyola
- Starring: Klaus Kinski; Maurice Poli; Franco Citti; Samy Pavel; Susy Andersen
- Cinematography: Silvio Fraschetti-Pistola
- Edited by: Vincenzo Vanni
- Music by: Piero Umiliani
- Production company: Roberto Loyola Cinematografica
- Distributed by: Regional
- Release date: 8 August 1969 (Italy)
- Country: Italy
- Box office: ₤140.995 million

Gangster's Law (Italian: La legge dei gangsters) is a 1969 Italian thriller film directed by Siro Marcellini and starring Klaus Kinski.

== Cast ==
- Klaus Kinski as Quintero
- Maurice Poli as Rino Quintero
- Franco Citti as Bruno Esposito
- Samy Pavel as Franco
- Susy Andersen as Mayde
- Hélène Chanel as Countess Elena Villani
- Micaela Pignatelli as Renato's lover
- Nello Pazzafini as the driver
- Aurora Batista as Rosi, Bruno's lover

== Production ==
Gangster's Law was filmed on location Genoa.

== Release ==
Gangster's Law was released in Italy on 8 August 1969 where it was distributed by Regional. It grossed a total of 140,995,000 Italian lire on its theatrical release.
