= ZWAM =

ZWAM (Zatovo Western Andevo Malagasy or Zatovo Western Amical Malagasy) was a youth movement which emerged in Antananarivo, Madagascar (the Malagasy Republic) in 1972 to support the student protests against the rule of President Philibert Tsiranana. The name has various interpretations, including "Malagasy Western Slave Youth" and "Zatovo Warriors' Association of Malagasy". The term "Western" in the title comes from the fact that members of the group were fans of Spaghetti Westerns and dressed in cowboy hats. According to Lesley Sharp the "cowboys" of ZWAM "assumed a style of dress reminiscent of Clint Eastwood, a loner recognized as the 'champion of real justice' over 'the venal guardians of formal law'". The group later changed its name to ZOAM, an acronym for Zatovo Orin'Asa Malagasy ("Young Unemployed of Madagascar").

The movement drew its membership from the poor, "black" quarters of the capital, traditionally inhabited by the descendants of slaves. ZWAM were the first slave descendants to form an organisation in Madagascar and they campaigned against discrimination against slave descendants in education and employment.

== Sources ==
- Randrianja, Solofo; Ellis, Stephen, eds. (2009). Madagascar: A Short History. London: Hurst. ISBN 978-1-85065-892-4. OCLC 351399044.
- Sambo, Clément (2001). Langages non conventionnels à Madagascar: argot des jeunes et proverbes gaillards (in French). Paris: Inalco-Karthala. ISBN 2-84586-164-8. OCLC 47735604.
- Sharp, Lesley A. (2002). The Sacrificed Generation: Youth, History, and the Colonized Mind in Madagascar. Berkeley: University of California Press. ISBN 0-520-22951-7. OCLC 59471111.
