= Tepepa =

1969 film

- Italian film poster
- Directed by: Giulio Petroni
- Screenplay by: Franco Solinas; Ivan Della Mea
- Produced by: Franco Clementi; Alfredo Cuomo; Nicolo Pomilia; Richard Herland
- Starring: Tomas Milian; Orson Welles; John Steiner; José Torres; Luciano Casamonica
- Cinematography: Francisco Marín
- Edited by: Eraldo Da Roma
- Music by: Ennio Morricone
- Production companies: Filmamerica; Società Italiana Attuazione Progetti (SIAP); Productores Exhibidores Films Sociedad Anónima (PEFSA)
- Distributed by: Magna
- Release date: 13 April 1969
- Running time: 132 minutes
- Countries: Italy; Spain
- Languages: Italian; Spanish; English

Tepepa, also known as Blood and Guns, is an Italian epic Zapata Western film starring Tomas Milian and Orson Welles. The film was directed by Giulio Petroni. It was co-produced with Spain, where the film was released with the title Tepepa... Viva La Revolución.

== Plot ==
The government of "comrade" Madero does not satisfy the peon Tepepa, who continues his guerilla battle as a revolutionary, against the government troops together with a group of faithful fighters. Tepepa is feeling mocked by the ex-revolutionary Madero, who is now head of state. Tepepa finds himself several times facing the fearsome chief of police, Colonel Cascorro, and is constantly persecuted by an English doctor, Henry Price. Dr. Price is eager to avenge a girl from a rich family, with whom he was in love, and whom Tepepa raped, causing her to commit suicide.

During the last fight Cascorro finally manages to wound Tepepa, who has escaped him several times, but in the decisive battle Cascarro is killed by the revolutionary. Meanwhile, the doctor, who despite his hatred for Tepepa had remained at the side of the revolutionaries, manages to take revenge on the peon, killing him with a scalpel immediately after extracting the bullet from his wound.

Henry Price then packs his horse to leave, only to be shot by a young boy named Paquito. The boy claims he did it because the Englishman once said he did not like Mexico.

The death of Tepepa, however, does not mark the end of the revolution, and others will continue the battle in his place.

== Cast ==
- Tomas Milian as Jesus Maria "Tepepa" Moran
- Orson Welles as Colonel Cascorro
- John Steiner as Doctor Henry Price
- José Torres as Pedro "El Piojo" Pereira
- Luciano Casamonica as Paquito
- Annamaria Lanciaprima as Maria Virgen Escalande
- George Wang as Mr. Chu
- Paco Sanz as President Madero
- Clara Colosimo as Sergeant's Wife
- Giancarlo Badessi as Sergeant
- Rafael Hernández as Pedro
- Paloma Cela as Consuelo
- Ángel Ortiz as Urelio

== Production ==
The film stars Tomas Milian and Orson Welles in opposing roles. Director Giulio Petroni expressed disappointment with Welles. Petroni claimed that the atmosphere on the set was "terrible," and that Welles called Milian (who idolized Welles) a "dirty Cuban".
