= Death Rides a Horse =

1967 film by Giulio Petroni

- Directed by: Giulio Petroni
- Written by: Luciano Vincenzoni
- Produced by: Alfonso Sansone; Henryk Chrosicki
- Starring: Lee Van Cleef; John Phillip Law; Luigi Pistilli; Anthony Dawson; Jose Torres; Mario Brega
- Cinematography: Carlo Carlini
- Edited by: Eraldo Da Roma
- Music by: Ennio Morricone
- Production company: PEC
- Distributed by: United Artists
- Release date: August 1967 (Italy)
- Running time: 114 minutes
- Country: Italy

Death Rides a Horse (Italian: Da uomo a uomo, lit. 'From man to man') is a 1967 Italian spaghetti Western directed by Giulio Petroni, written by Luciano Vincenzoni and starring Lee Van Cleef and John Phillip Law.

== Plot ==
Bill, a boy whose father was killed and mother and sister were gang raped and murdered in front of him by five robbers, sets out 15 years later to exact revenge, having used the time to become an expert marksman. Each of the outlaws bears a characteristic which Bill memorized while watching his family be slaughtered and his house set on fire: The first has a tattoo of four aces on his chest, the second a scar, the third one a distinctive earring. The fourth man's face is unveiled during the event, and Bill remembers it distinctly. After the house is set on fire, Bill is rescued by a man wearing a skull necklace, whose face he does not see. Hiding under a wagon as the men ride off, Bill finds a spur.

As Bill begins his journey, a gunfighter named Ryan is released from a prison after serving 15 years there. He was framed for an armed robbery by the very same men who murdered Bill's family. Ryan is tracked by two men as he leaves prison; he later kills them, revealing to himself and Bill that they were hired by one of the men who killed Bill's family. Bill goes after Ryan, who he believes is involved with the men somehow. Ryan gets the better of Bill, but spares him, and tries to dissuade him from his revenge. In the next town, Ryan asks for a man named Cavanaugh, the owner of a large saloon. Ryan threatens Cavanaugh, asking him for 15,000 dollars: 1,000 for each year in prison. It is revealed that Cavanaugh is the one who hired the two men to kill Ryan. Bill is then hired to kill Ryan after winning a gunfight at Cavanaugh's saloon, but Ryan gets the better of Bill yet again, and again spares him. Bill manages to kill Cavanaugh in a duel after recognizing him as the man with the four aces, and Ryan saves him after his gun goes dry. Chastising Bill for not counting his shots, Ryan yet again insists on going after the other outlaws alone. They cross paths again in Lyndon City, where Ryan meets with a rich banker named Walcott and demands 30,000 dollars: 15,000 for the 15 years in prison, plus the money Cavanaugh owed him. Walcott captures Ryan, then stages a robbery on his own bank and frames him. When the tables are turned later, Bill reciprocates, helping Ryan escape from jail. Bill then sets off on his own, leaving Ryan without a horse.

Bill reaches a Mexican town, where he recognizes the man with the big earring and guns him down. He is captured by the outlaws that run the town, beaten and buried alive from the neck down (he had also recognized the man with the scar, who was the third man's brother, and Walcott, who is revealed to be the fourth man). Walcott and the outlaws leave after Bill lies about Ryan's location. Left to die in the hot sun, he is rescued by Ryan, who shoots several men standing guard. He and Bill enlist the townspeople in setting up defenses to hold off the gang. They manage to kill a few bandits, including the second man, but the men of the town are slaughtered. Afterwards, the gang leaves for the night. Next morning, while preparing for the gang's return, Bill notices that Ryan is wearing a necklace with a skull. Ryan admits he was present during the murders, but arrived late and did not participate; he also rescued Bill from the fire. He gives his word that once the outlaws have been dealt with, he will remain to face whatever justice Bill seeks.

In the final shootout, which takes place during a dust storm, Bill and Ryan cleverly whittle down the gang members until it seems like Walcott is the last man standing. Walcott had Bill dead to rights, only to be killed by Ryan's thrown knife. Bill nonetheless insists on revenge. Ryan's gun is empty, but Bill has three bullets. He throws one to Ryan, and one to the ground, leaving him with a single round in the chamber. Ryan turns his back and walks away, as Bill yells for him to turn around and defend himself. Bill fires, but it is only to kill a surviving outlaw. Ryan then reveals that he had not loaded the bullet, and offers it to Bill. He refuses. A grateful Ryan watches as Bill mounts his horse and rides away.

== Cast ==
- Lee Van Cleef as Ryan
- John Phillip Law as Bill Meceita
  - Walter Giulangeli as Bill as a boy
- Luigi Pistilli as Walcott
- Anthony Dawson as Burt "Four Aces" Cavanaugh
- José Torres as Pedro
- Mario Brega as One-Eye
- Franco Balducci as Lyndon City Sheriff
- Bruno Corazzari as Holly Spring Bartender
- Felicita Fanny as Martita
- Ignazio Leone as Holly Spring Preacher
- Carlo Pisacane as Holly Spring Stationmaster
- Angelo Susani as Paco
- Guglielmo Spoletini as Manuel
- Vivienne Bocca as Bill's Sister
- Elena Hall as Bill's Mother
- Mario Mandalari as Hotel Worker
- Nazzareno Natale as Pedro's Henchman
- Ennio Pagliani as John Meceita
- Giovanni Petrucci as Walcott's Henchman
- Romano Puppo as Lyndon City Deputy Sheriff
- Richard Watson as Sheriff of Bill's Hometown
- Archie Savage as Black Gambler

Uncredited (in order of appearance)

- Remo Capitani as Gold Escort Member
- Carla Cassola as Betsy
- Nino Vingelli as Card Player
- Jeff Cameron as Cavanaugh's Henchman
- Nerina Montagnani as the Preacher's Wife
- José Terrón as Walcott's Henchman

== Production ==
The screenplay and story of Death Rides a Horse was written by Luciano Vincenzoni. Vincenzoni went to work with director Giulio Petroni after having a falling out with Sergio Leone while the latter was making The Good, The Bad, and the Ugly.

== Releases ==
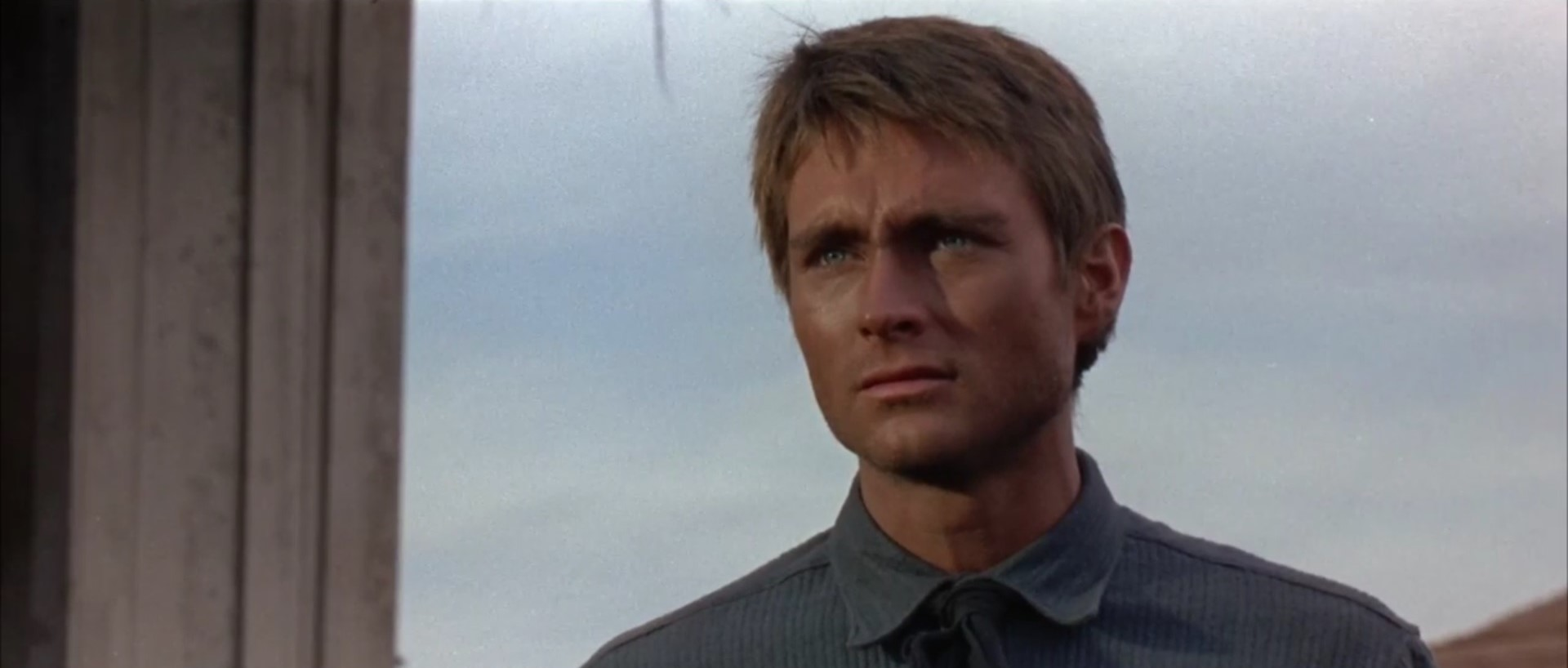
John Phillip Law in a screenshot from Death Rides a Horse

Death Rides a Horse was released in Italy in August 1967. The film was released uncut in the United Kingdom and United States in 1969.

== Reception ==
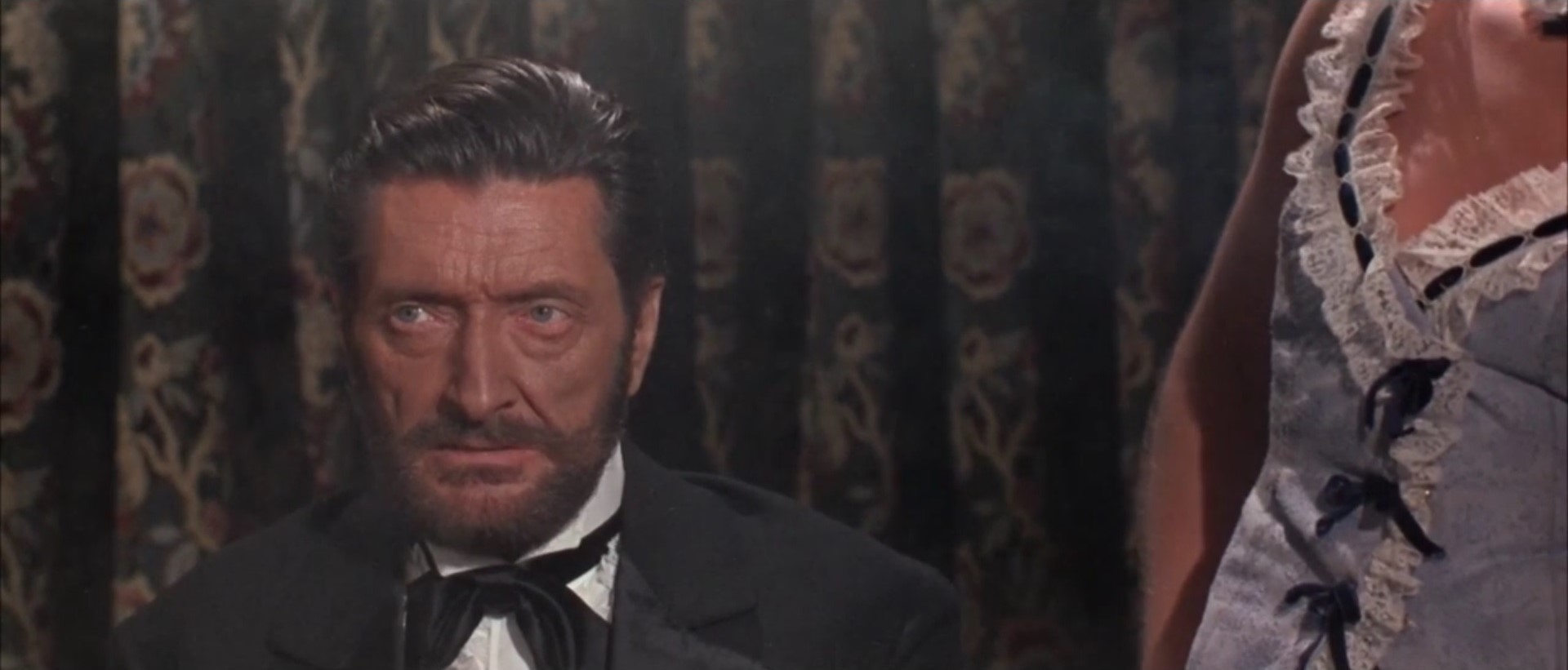
Anthony Dawson in a screenshot from Death Rides a Horse

A contemporary review, the Monthly Film Bulletin declared the film to be a "display piece" for John Phillip Law and Lee Van Cleef, noting that Van Cleef was "in excellent form." The review declared the film to be "less gimmicky than most Italian Westerns, and all the better for it." The review noted that the recurring flashbacks were "tiresome" but had relevance to the narrative. "Robe" of Variety said that the film wouldn't reach the popularity of earlier Clint Eastwood westerns, noting that the script borrows from other Italian Westerns and that "good color photography and an interesting score by Ennio Morricone are the pic's strong points. Otherwise, all technical elements are routine."

== Analysis ==
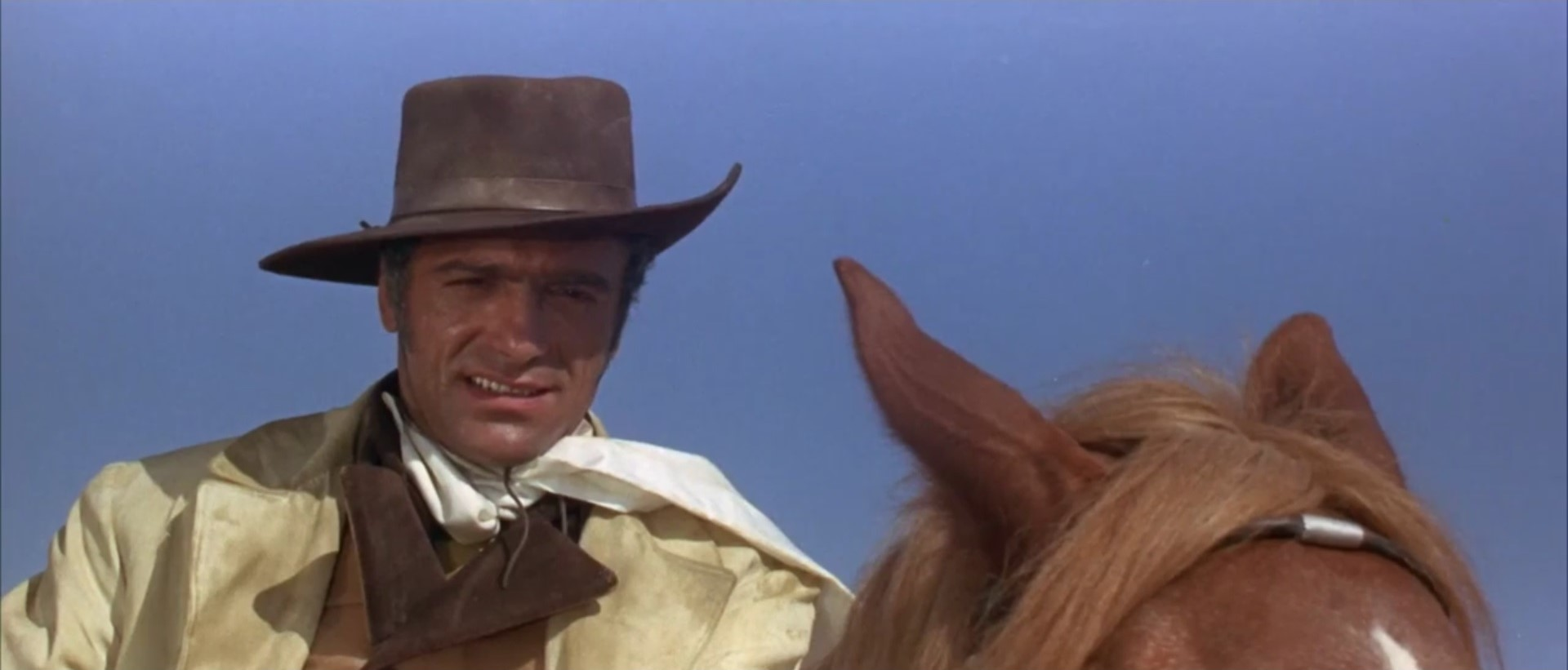
Luigi Pistilli in a screenshot from Death Rides a Horse

In his investigation of narrative structures in spaghetti Western films, writer Bert Fridlund ranges Death Rides a Horse, together with Day of Anger as prime examples of a "tutorship variation" that further develops the play on age/experience between the protagonists in For a Few Dollars More, with Lee Van Cleef playing the older partner in all three films. In the "Tutorship" films, a younger protagonist seeks the more or less reluctant partnership of an older one, but differences of motivation eventually bring them into conflict.

== See also ==
- A Man Called Blade
- Zanjeer (1973 film)
