= Craig Hill (actor) =

American actor (1926–2014)

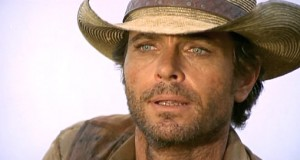
- Craig Hill as Clayton in Lo voglio morto
- Born: Craig Hill Fowler; March 5, 1926; Los Angeles, California, U.S.
- Died: April 21, 2014 (aged 88); Barcelona, Spain
- Occupation: Actor
- Years active: 1950–2003
- Spouse: Teresa Gimpera (1990–2014; his death)

Craig Hill (born Craig Hill Fowler; March 5, 1926 – April 21, 2014) was an American film actor from Los Angeles, California. Since the mid-1960s, he predominantly acted in European films.

== Career ==
He was educated in Los Angeles and enrolled the United States Navy. Hill began his film career as a contract star for 20th Century Fox beginning with Cheaper by the Dozen. He also appeared in Sam Fuller's Fixed Bayonets (1951) and John Ford's What Price Glory as well as in a key role opposite Kirk Douglas in the 1951 crime drama Detective Story. After leaving Fox, he co-starred in Universal's The Black Shield of Falworth (1954) and appeared in several American television shows.

Hill is best known for co-starring in the Desilu Studios television series Whirlybirds from 1957 to 1960, playing "P.T. Moore". In the mid-1960s, he moved to Spain and gained a new series of fans as a lead actor in several Spaghetti Westerns beginning with Hands of a Gunfighter (1965). In 1978 he settled in Begur and starred in several Euro Horror films as well, including The Bloodstained Shadow (1978) and The Monsters of Terror (1970).

== Personal life and death ==
Actor Ray Stricklyn says that he met Hill about Christmas 1955, and the two spent a year together in a romantic relationship. Sticklyn says he broke up with Hill after he discovered Hill was seeing another man.

In 1990, Hill wed Catalan fashion model and actress Teresa Gimpera, his co-star in the 1966 Spanish film Black Box Affair.

Craig Hill died in Barcelona on April 21, 2014, at the age of 88.

== Filmography ==
Film
| Year | Title | Role | Notes |
|---|---|---|---|
| 1950 | Cheaper by the Dozen | Tom Black | Uncredited |
| 1950 | All About Eve | Leading Man | |
| 1951 | Detective Story | Arthur Kindred | |
| 1951 | Fixed Bayonets! | Lt. Gibbs | |
| 1952 | The Outcasts of Poker Flat | Tom Dakin | |
| 1952 | What Price Glory? | Lt. Aldrich | |
| 1953 | The I Don't Care Girl | Keene | |
| 1954 | Siege at Red River | Lt. Braden | |
| 1954 | The Black Shield of Falworth | Francis Gascoyne | |
| 1956 | Anything Goes | Danny | Uncredited |
| 1957 | Tammy and the Bachelor | Ernie | |
| 1958 | Lafayette Escadrille | Lufbery | Uncredited |
| 1961 | You Have to Run Fast | Frank Harlow | |
| 1961 | The Flight that Disappeared | Tom Endicott | |
| 1962 | Deadly Duo | Preston 'Pres' Morgan | |
| 1965 | Hands of a Gunfighter | Dan Murphy | |
| 1966 | Taste for Killing | Hank Fellows | |
| 1966 | Follow Me, Boys! | Leo as a Man | Uncredited |
| 1966 | Black Box Affair | Johnny Grant | |
| 1966 | The Swinger | Sammy Jenkins | |
| 1967 | Adios, Hombre | Will Flaherty | |
| 1967 | 15 forche per un assassino | Billy Mack | |
| 1967 | Ric e Gian alla conquista del West | Stuart | |
| 1968 | I Want Him Dead | Clayton | |
| 1968 | Bury Them Deep | Clive | |
| 1968 | No Graves on Boot Hill | Jerry | |
| 1969 | Las amigas | Eduardo | |
| 1970 | The Monsters of Terror (aka Dracula vs. Frankenstein) | Inspector Tobermann | |
| 1970 | Aoom | | |
| 1970 | When Heroes Die | Capitán Richard Harvey | |
| 1971 | And the Crows Will Dig Your Grave | Jeff Sullivan | |
| 1971 | In nome del padre, del figlio e della Colt | Sheriff Bill Nolan / Mace Cassidy | |
| 1971 | Drummer of Vengeance | Oconner | |
| 1972 | Bada alla tua pelle, Spirito Santo! | Col. John Mills | |
| 1972 | My Horse, My Gun, Your Widow | Doctor Janus Saxon | |
| 1972 | Go Away! Trinity Has Arrived in Eldorado | Eldorado | |
| 1972 | Un animale chiamato uomo | Mark Forester | |
| 1973 | Corte marziale | Colonel | |
| 1974 | Cinco almohadas para una noche | Andrés, amante #5 | |
| 1974 | El refugio del miedo | Bob | |
| 1977 | Emanuelle Around the World | Disfigured-Face Man | Uncredited |
| 1978 | Stringimi forte papà | | |
| 1978 | The Bloodstained Shadow (aka Solamente Nero) | Don Paolo | |
| 1980 | Estigma | | |
| 1983 | Victòria! La gran aventura d'un poble | Tinent Coronel Bruguete | |
| 1983 | Victòria! 2: La disbauxa del 17 | Tinent Coronel Bruguete | |
| 1984 | Victòria! 3: El seny i la rauxa | Tinent Coronel Bruguete | |
| 1985 | Escapada final (Scapegoat) | Andreu | |
| 1987 | Angustia | Doctor at Hospital | |
| 1989 | La Chute des aigles (Fall of Eagles) | Major Holbach | directed by Jesus Franco |
| 1989 | La bahía esmeralda (Emerald Bay) | Jonathan Perry | directed by Jesus Franco |
| 1991 | Lolita al desnudo | Don José | |
| 1991 | Escrit als estels | | |
| 1994 | General Holmes | | |
| 1994 | ¿Culpable de qué? | | |
| 1994 | Ciudad Baja (Downtown Heat) | D. Miguel | directed by Jesus Franco |
| 2002 | Food of Love | Izzy | |
| 2002 | El segundo nombre | Theodore Logan | |
| 2003 | Platillos volantes | Director Coca-Cola | (final film role) |
