= Susy Andersen =

Italian actress (b. 1940)

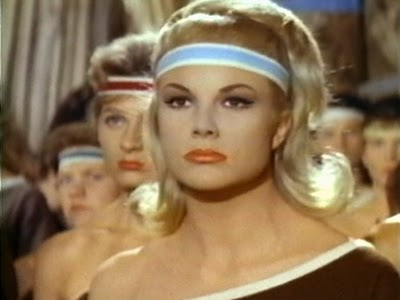
- Andersen in Thor and the Amazon Women (1963)
- Born: Maria Antonietta Golgi; 20 April 1940 (age 86); Pola, Istria, Italy (now Croatia)
- Other name: Susy Golgi
- Occupation: Actress
- Years active: 1960–1969

Maria Antonietta Golgi (born 20 April 1940), known by the stage name Susy Andersen, is an Italian former actress. She is known for her roles in several genre films of the 1960s.

== Filmography ==
| Year | Title | Role | Notes |
|---|---|---|---|
| 1960 | The Warrior Empress | Actis | Credited as 'Susy Golgi' |
| 1963 | Thor and the Amazon Women | Tamar | |
| 1963 | Black Sabbath | Sdenka | Segment: "The Wurdalak" |
| 1964 | Rome Against Rome | Tullio | |
| 1964 | I due violenti | Mary Sheridan | |
| 1964 | The Magnificent Cuckold | Wanda Mariotti | |
| 1964 | Beautiful Families | Carla | Segment: "The Queen's Bastard" |
| 1965 | The Gentlemen | Eveline | Segments: "Die Bauern", "Die Intellektuellen" |
| 1966 | Bob Fleming... Mission Casablanca | Velka | Credited as 'Susy Anderson' |
| 1967 | 15 Scaffolds for a Murderer | Barbara Ferguson | |
| 1968 | La bambolona | Silvia | |
| 1969 | Nel labirinto del sesso (Psichidion) | Nymphomaniac | |
| 1969 | Gangster's Law | Mayde | |
