= Black Box Affair =

- Directed by: Marcello Ciorciolini
- Written by: Marcello Ciorciolini; Nino Quevedo
- Produced by: Silvio Battistini; Francesco Campitelli
- Starring: Craig Hill
- Cinematography: Angelo Filippini
- Edited by: Otello Colangeli
- Music by: Gianni Ferrio
- Release date: October 1966
- Countries: Italy; Spain
- Language: Italian

Black Box Affair (Italian: Black Box Affair - Il mondo trema, Spanish: Amenaza black box) is a 1966 Italian-Spanish Eurospy film written and directed by Marcello Ciorciolini and starring Craig Hill (at his only spy film) and Teresa Gimpera. Hill first met Gimpera in this film, and the couple got married shortly later. It is one of the rare films of the time depicting an alliance between Soviets and Americans to face a higher menace.

== Cast ==
- Craig Hill as Johnny Grant
- Teresa Gimpera as Floriane
- Luis Marín as Pablo
- George Rigaud as General MacGregor
- Rolf Tasna as Fabian
- Rossella Bergamonti as Myriam (credited as Patricia Carr)
- George Wang as a Chinese agent
- Moa Tahi as Ambra
