= José Terrón (actor) =

Spanish actor (1939–2019)

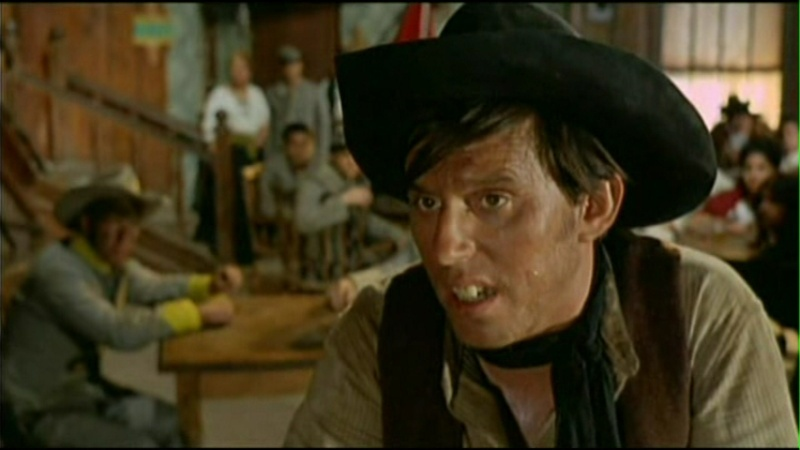
- José Terrón as Logan in Lo voglio morto (1968)
- Born: José Terrón Peñaranda; 5 July 1939; Madrid, Spain
- Died: 12 May 2019 (aged 79); Benidorm, Spain
- Occupation: Film actor
- Children: Marimar Terrón
- Relatives: Pedro Terrón Pañaranda; Ángel Terrón Pañaranda; Víctor Terrón Pañaranda

José Terrón Peñaranda (5 July 1939 – 12 May 2019) was a Spanish film actor. He played Guy Callaway in For a Few Dollars More (1965), and Thomas "Shorty" Larson in The Good, the Bad and the Ugly (1966).

Terrón died in Benidorm on 12 May 2019, at the age of 79.

== Filmography ==
- El Cid (1961) as Soldier (uncredited)
- The Fall of the Roman Empire (1964) as Soldier on a horse (uncredited)
- Circus World (1964) as Circus rider (uncredited)
- For a Few Dollars More (1965) as Guy Calloway, Mortimer's 1st Criminal (uncredited)
- Django (1966) as Ringo – Klan Member with Scar (uncredited)
- Man from Nowhere (1966) as Watch Henchman (uncredited)
- Navajo Joe (1966) as Soldier (uncredited)
- The Good, the Bad and the Ugly (1966) as Thomas 'Shorty' Larson (uncredited)
- Death Rides a Horse (1967) as Complice di Walcott (uncredited)
- God Forgives... I Don't! (1967) as 'Flatface' – San Antonio Henchman (uncredited)
- 15 Scaffolds for a Murderer (1967) as Hangman (uncredited)
- I Want Him Dead (1968) as Logan – Cowboy Drinking at Saloon (uncredited)
- White Comanche as (1968) Comanche / Townsman (uncredited)
- Shalako (1968) as Indian (uncredited)
- Gunman of Ave Maria (1969) as Francisco Henchman (uncredited)
- The Devil's Backbone (1970) as Apache (uncredited) (final film role)
