= Giulio Petroni =

Italian filmmaker

Giulio Petroni (21 September 1917 – 31 January 2010) was an Italian director, writer, and screenwriter, best known for his spaghetti Westerns Death Rides a Horse (1967), with Lee Van Cleef in one of his first starring roles, A Sky Full of Stars for a Roof (1968), with Giuliano Gemma, and Tepepa (1969), with Orson Welles and Tomas Milian.

Occasionally Petroni has been listed under the pseudonym Jeremy Scott.

== Life ==
Giulio Petroni was born in Rome on 21 September 1917. After graduating in literature, Giulio Petroni began working as a director making a short film for the INCOM newsreel, entitled Goethe in Rome. He also worked as a columnist for various newspapers.

After the Second World War - Petroni had participated as a partisan supporter of the communists and anti-fascists - he went to Ceylon, where he headed the local film department and made documentaries; on his return he continued this with a series of political documentaries. Political topics can also be discovered in his feature films - the revolutionary Western Tepepa in particular offers a wealth of material for political analysis.

He debuted as a director in 1959 with the comedy film La cento chilometri, followed by two other feature films on the same year. Then he worked for the RAI broadcasting company until he found his way back to the big screen in 1966 and was particularly successful in the spaghetti Western genre.

From 1967 Petroni directed five spaghetti Westerns, generally considered among the most important in its genre. In addition to those mentioned, titles include Night of the Serpent (1969) and Life Is Tough, Eh Providence? (1972), with Tomas Milian as Provvidenza.

After withdrawing from the film business at the end of the 1970s, Petroni turned to writing as a novelist and essayist. In 1986, he won the Dessì Prize for fiction.

== Filmography ==
=== Director and screenwriter ===
- La cento chilometri (1959)
- Night of the Serpent (La notte dei serpenti, 1969)
- Do Not Commit Adultery (Non commettere atti impuri, 1971)
- Life Is Tough, Eh Providence? (La vita, a volto, è molto dura vero provvidenza?, 1972)
- Lips of Lurid Blue (Labbra di lurido blu, 1975)
- L'osceno desiderio (1977, credited as Jeremy Scott)
- Il rivale (1987)

=== Director ===
- I piaceri dello scapolo (1960)
- I soliti rapinatori a Milano (1963)
- Always on Sunday (Una domenica d'estate, 1966)
- Death Rides a Horse (Da uomo a uomo, 1967)
- A Sky Full of Stars for a Roof (... E per tetto un cielo di stelle, 1968)
- Tepepa (aka Blood and Guns, 1969)
- Increase and Multiply (Crescete e moltiplicatevi, 1973)

== Literary works ==
- La città calda, G. Feltrinelli, Milano 1961
- Il rivale, Marsilio, Venezia 1980
- Le speranze e gli inganni, Dalia, Roma 1986
- Il rancore, Dalia, Roma 1989
- La strega di Colobraro, Dalia, Roma 1992
- Se questa è una patria, Dalia, Roma 1995
- Le ceneri del cinema italiano, Dalia, Roma 2001
- La quadrupla verità, Roma, Dalia, stampa 2001
- Lore Blum, Dalia, Roma 2002
- Sgarbo a Sgarbi e la sua band, S.l. Dalia, 2002
- Le passeggiate nelle sabbie mobili, Dalia, Roma 2004
- Trash, Dalia, Roma 2004
