= Spaghetti Western =

Italian Western subgenre

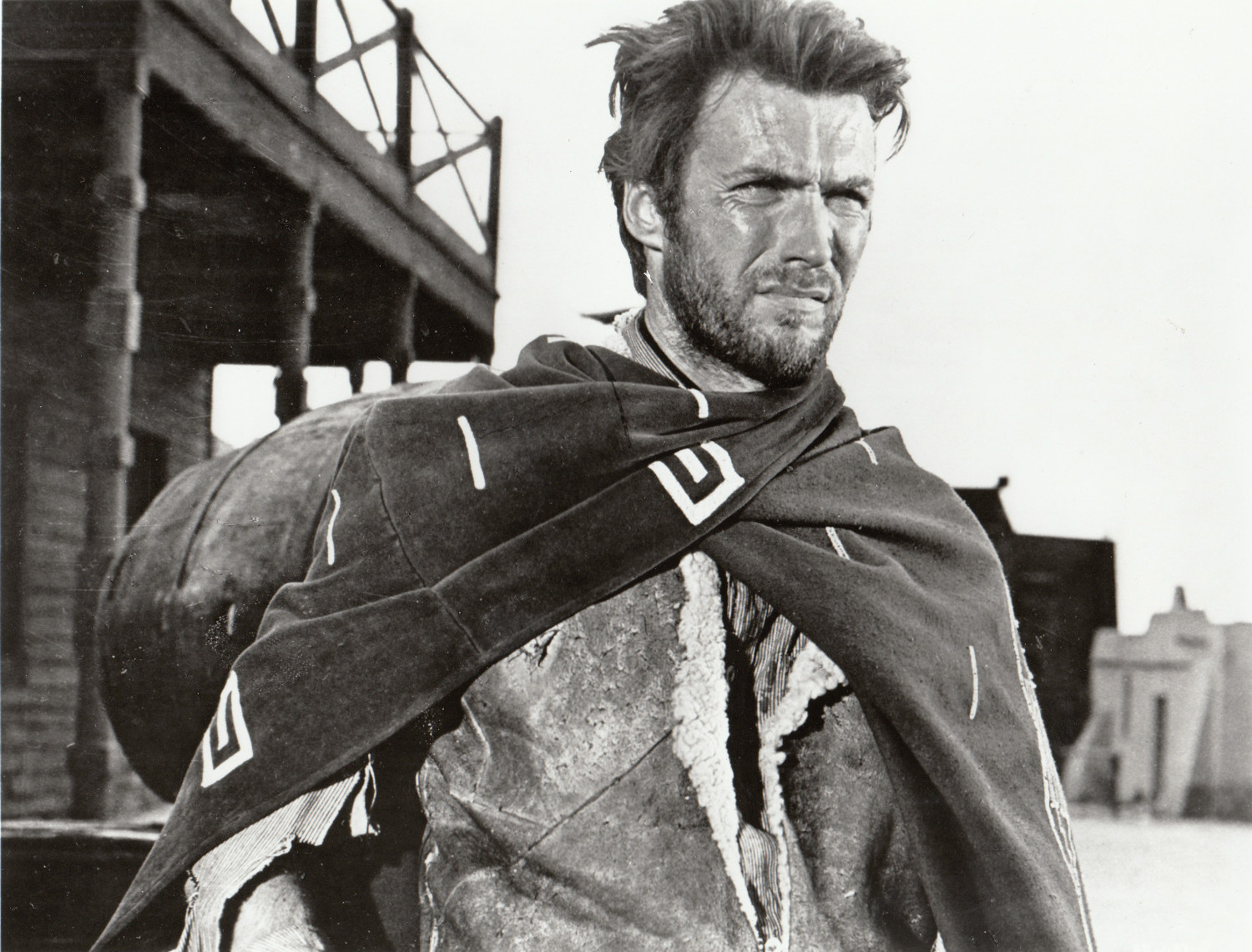
Clint Eastwood as the Man with No Name in a publicity image for A Fistful of Dollars, directed by Sergio Leone

The spaghetti Western is a broad subgenre of Western films produced in Europe. It emerged in the mid-1960s in the wake of Sergio Leone's filmmaking style and international box-office success. The term was used by foreign critics because most of these Westerns were produced and directed by Italians.

The majority of the films in the spaghetti Western genre were international co-productions by Italy and Spain, and sometimes France, West Germany, Britain, Portugal, Greece, Yugoslavia, and the United States. Over six hundred European Westerns were made between 1960 and 1978, including nearly five hundred in Italy, which dominated the market. Most spaghetti Westerns filmed between 1964 and 1978 were made on low budgets, and shot at Cinecittà Studios and various locations around southern Italy and Spain.

Leone's films and other core spaghetti Westerns are often described as having eschewed, criticized, or even "demythologized" many of the conventions of traditional U.S. Westerns. This was partly intentional and partly due to a different cultural context. In 1968, the wave of spaghetti Westerns reached its crest, comprising one-third of the Italian film production, only to collapse to one-tenth in 1969. Spaghetti Westerns have left their mark on popular culture, strongly influencing numerous works produced in and outside of Italy.

== Terminology ==
The phrase spaghetti Western was coined by Spanish journalist Alfonso Sánchez Martínez in 1966, in reference to the Italian food spaghetti. Spaghetti Westerns are also known as Italian Westerns, meatball Westerns or, primarily in Japan, macaroni Westerns. In Italy, the genre is typically referred to as western all'italiana (Italian-style Western). Italo-Western is also used, especially in Germany.

=== Similar concepts ===
The term Eurowesterns has been used to broadly refer to all non-Italian Western movies from Europe, including the West German Winnetou films and the Eastern Bloc Red Western films. Taking its name from the Spanish rice dish, "Paella Western" has been used to refer to Western films produced in Spain. The Japanese film Tampopo was promoted as a "Ramen Western".

== Production ==
Most films in the spaghetti Western genre were international co-productions by Italy and Spain, and sometimes France, West Germany, Britain, Portugal, Greece, Yugoslavia, and the United States. Over six hundred European Westerns were made between 1960 and 1978.

These movies were originally released in Italian or with Italian dubbing, but because most of the films featured multilingual casts and post-synced sound, most western all'italiana do not have a single official language. The movies typically had a B-movie setting or lower-budget production similar to classic Western films.

The typical spaghetti Western team was made up of an Italian director, an Italo-Spanish technical staff, and a cast of Italian, Spanish, and (sometimes) West German and American actors.

=== Filming locations ===
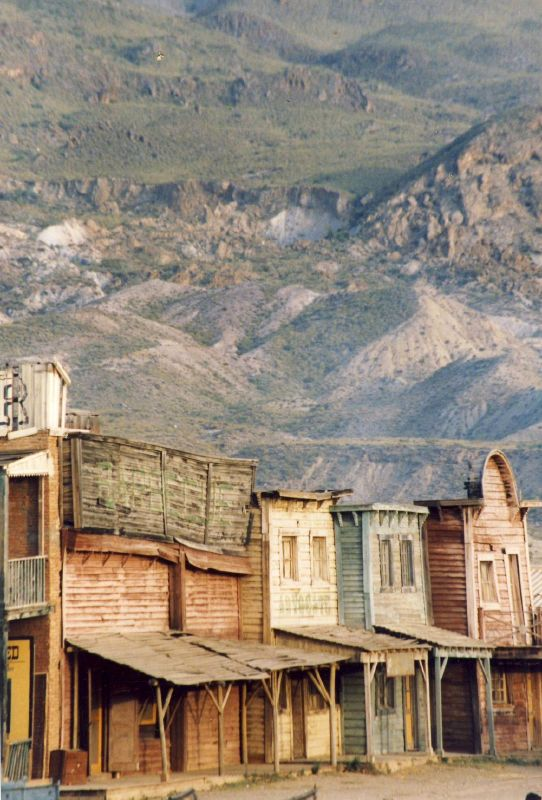
Scenery from the film The Good, the Bad, and the Ugly by Sergio Leone in Almería, Andalusia, Spain

Most spaghetti Westerns filmed between 1964 and 1978 were made on low budgets, and shot at Cinecittà Studios and various locations around southern Italy and Spain. Many of the stories take place in the dry landscapes of the American Southwest and Northern Mexico, thus, common filming locations were the Tabernas Desert and the Cabo de Gata-Níjar Natural Park, an area of volcanic origin known for its wide sandy beaches, both of which are in the Province of Almería in Southeastern Spain. Some sets and studios built for spaghetti Westerns survived as theme parks, such as Texas Hollywood, Mini Hollywood, and Western Leone, and are still used as film sets. Other filming locations used were in central and southern Italy, such as the parks of Valle del Treja (between Rome and Viterbo), the area of Camposecco (next to Camerata Nuova, characterized by a karst topography), the hills around Castelluccio, the area around the Gran Sasso mountain, and the Tivoli's quarries and Sardinia. God's Gun was filmed in Israel.

== Context and origins ==
=== Early European Westerns ===
European Westerns are as old as filmmaking itself. The Lumière brothers held their first public film screening in 1895, and in 1896, Gabriel Veyre shot Repas d'Indien (Indian Banquet) for them. Joe Hamman starred as Arizona Bill in films made in the French horse country of Camargue (1911–1912).

In Italy, the American West as a dramatic setting for spectacles goes back at least as far as Giacomo Puccini's 1910 opera La fanciulla del West (The Girl of the Golden West or The Damsel of the West), which is sometimes considered to be the first spaghetti Western.

The first Western movie made in Italy was La voce del sangue, produced by the Turin film studio Itala Film. In 1913, La vampira Indiana was released; a combination of Western and vampire film. It was directed by Vincenzo Leone, father of Sergio Leone, and starred his mother, Bice Valerian, in the title role as the Indian princess Fatale. The Italians also made Wild Bill Hickok films, while the Germans released backwoods Westerns featuring Bela Lugosi as Uncas.

Of the Western-related European films before 1964, the one that attracted the most attention is arguably Luis Trenker's Der Kaiser von Kalifornien about John Sutter. Another Italian Western is Girl of the Golden West. The film's title alludes to the Giacomo Puccini opera referred to above, but it is not an adaptation. It was one of a handful of Westerns to be made during the silent film and Fascist Italy eras. Forerunners of the genre were also Giorgio Ferroni's Il fanciullo del West (The Boy in the West) and Fernando Cerchio's Il bandolero stanco, starring Erminio Macario and Renato Rascel, respectively.

After World War II, there were scattered European uses of Western settings, mostly for comedy, musicals, or other genres. A cycle of Western comedies was initiated in 1959 with La sceriffa and Il terrore dell'Oklahoma, followed by other films starring comedy specialists, such as Walter Chiari, Ugo Tognazzi, Raimondo Vianello, and Fernandel. An Italian critic has compared these comedies to American Bob Hope vehicles.

=== Origins of the genre ===
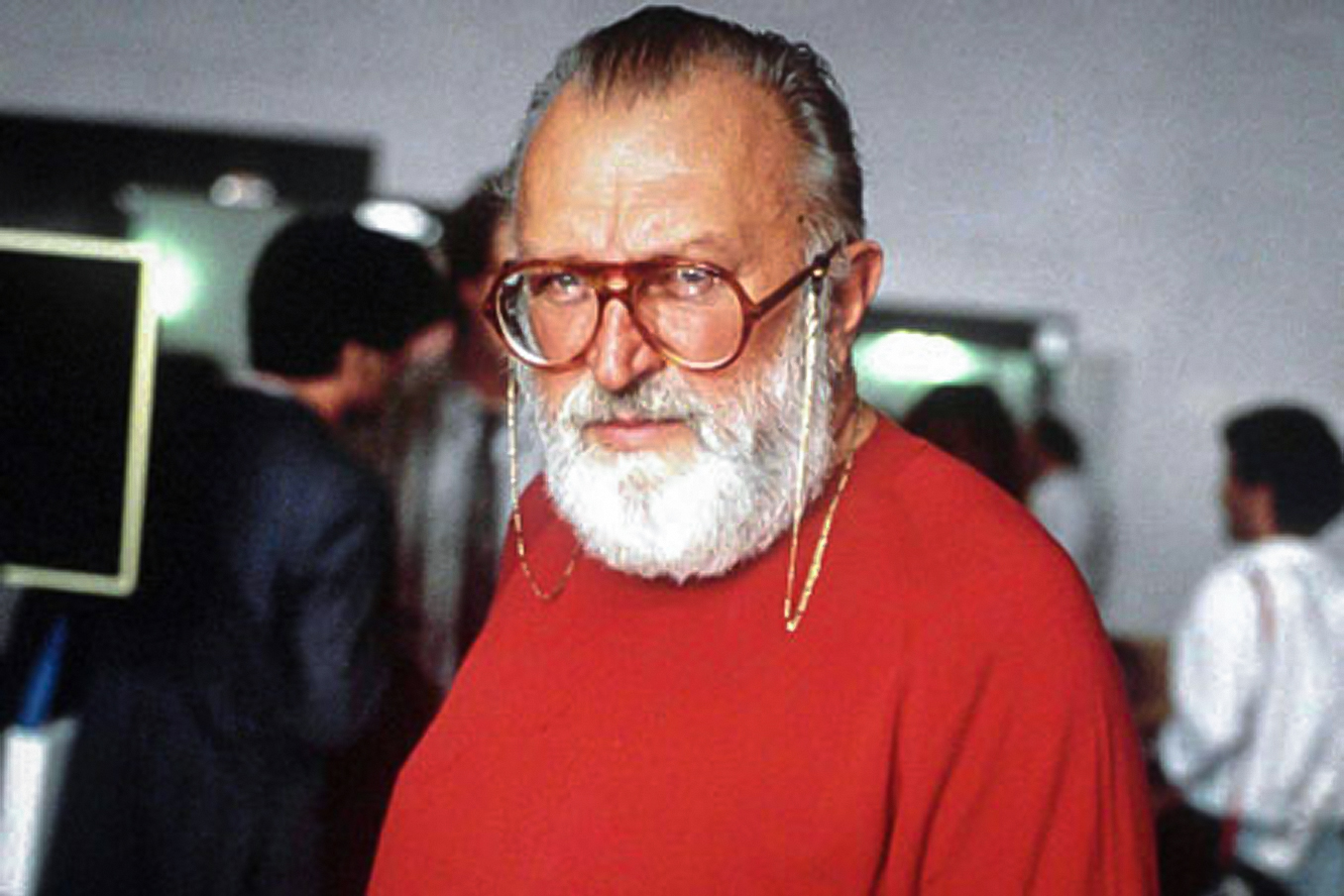
Sergio Leone, one of the most representative directors of the genre

The first American-British Western filmed in Spain was The Sheriff of Fractured Jaw, directed by Raoul Walsh in 1958. It was followed by Savage Guns, a British-Spanish Western, again filmed in Spain. It marked the beginning of Spain as a suitable filming location for all types of European Westerns. The same year, in 1961, an Italian company coproduced the French Taste of Violence, with a Mexican Revolution theme. In 1963, three non-comedy Italo-Spanish Westerns were produced: Gunfight at Red Sands, Implacable Three, and Gunfight at High Noon.

In 1965, Bruno Bozzetto released his traditionally animated feature film West and Soda, a Western parody with a marked spaghetti Western theme. Although it was released a year after Sergio Leone's seminal spaghetti Western A Fistful of Dollars, development of West and Soda actually began a year earlier than Fistful's, and lasted longer, mainly because of the use of more time-demanding animation over regular acting. For this reason, Bozzetto claims to have invented the spaghetti Western genre.

Because there is no real consensus about where to draw the exact line between spaghetti Westerns and other Euro-Westerns (or other Westerns in general), it cannot be said which film is definitively the first spaghetti Western. However, 1964 saw the genre's breakthrough, with more than twenty productions or coproductions from Italian companies, and more than half a dozen Westerns by Spanish or Spanish-American companies. Furthermore, by far the most commercially successful of this lot was Sergio Leone's A Fistful of Dollars. It was the innovations in cinematic style, music, acting, and story of Leone's first Western that decided that spaghetti Westerns became a distinct subgenre and not just a number of films looking like American Westerns.

=== A Fistful of Dollars and its impact ===
In this seminal film, Leone used a distinct visual style, with large close-ups of faces, to tell the story of a hero entering a town ruled by two outlaw gangs, where ordinary social relations are nonexistent. The hero betrays both gangs and pits them against each other for profit. He uses his cunning and exceptional weapons skill to assist a family threatened by both gangs. His treachery is exposed, and he is severely beaten, but in the end, he defeats the remaining gang. The interactions in this story range between cunning and irony (the hero's tricks, deceits, unexpected actions, and sarcasm) and pathos (terror and brutality against defenseless people and against the hero after his double-cross is revealed). Ennio Morricone's innovative score expresses a similar duality, pairing quirky, unusual sounds and instruments with sacral dramatizing for the big confrontation scenes. Another important novelty was Clint Eastwood's performance as the man with no name—an unshaven, sarcastic, insolent Western antihero with personal goals in mind, and with distinct visuals to boot—the squint, the cigarillo, the poncho, etc.

The spaghetti Western was born, flourished, and faded in a highly commercial production environment. Italian "low" popular film production was usually low-budget and low-profit, and the easiest way to succeed was to imitate a proven success. When the typically low-budget production A Fistful of Dollars became a remarkable box-office success, the industry began to copy its innovations. Most subsequent Spaghetti Westerns aimed to portray a laconic hero with superhuman weapon skill, preferably one resembling Clint Eastwood: Franco Nero, John Garko, and Terence Hill started out that way; Anthony Steffen and others stayed that way throughout their spaghetti Western careers.

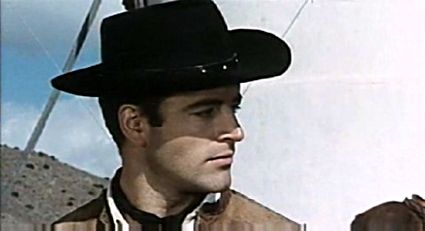
A Pistol for Ringo by Duccio Tessari

Whoever the hero was, he would join an outlaw gang to further his own secret agenda, as in A Pistol for Ringo, Blood for a Silver Dollar, Vengeance Is a Dish Served Cold, Renegade Riders, and others, while Beyond the Law has a bandit infiltrate society and become a sheriff. There would be a flamboyant Mexican bandit (Gian Maria Volonté from A Fistful of Dollars, otherwise Tomas Milian, or most often Fernando Sancho) and a grumpy old man, often an undertaker, to serve as a sidekick for the hero. For the love interest, ranchers' daughters, schoolmarms and barroom maidens were overshadowed by young Latin women desired by dangerous men, for which actresses, such as Nicoletta Machiavelli or Rosalba Neri, carried on Marianne Koch's role of Marisol in the Leone film. The villains' terror of their defenseless victims became just as ruthless as in A Fistful of Dollars, or more, and their brutalization of the hero when his treachery is disclosed became just as merciless, or more—similar to securing the latter's retribution.

At first, some films mixed these new devices with borrowed U.S. Western devices typical of most 1963–1964 spaghetti Westerns. For example, in Sergio Corbucci's Minnesota Clay, which appeared two months after A Fistful of Dollars, an American-style "tragic gunfighter" hero confronts two evil gangs, one Mexican and one Anglo, with (as in A Fistful of Dollars) the leader of the latter being the town sheriff.

In Johnny Oro, a traditional Western sheriff and a mixed-race bounty killer are forced into an uneasy alliance when Mexican bandits and Native Americans assault the town. In A Pistol for Ringo, a traditional sheriff commissions a money-oriented hero played by Giuliano Gemma (as deadly but with more pleasing manners than Eastwood's character) to infiltrate a gang of Mexican bandits whose leader is played typically by Fernando Sancho.

== Further developments of the genre ==
As with Leone's first Western, the Dollars Trilogy strongly influenced the further developments of the genre, as did Sergio Corbucci's Django and Enzo Barboni's two Trinity films, as well as some other successful spaghetti Westerns.

=== For a Few Dollars More and unstable partnerships ===
After 1965, when Leone's second Western, For a Few Dollars More, brought a larger box-office success, the profession of bounty hunter became the choice of occupation of spaghetti Western heroes in films, such as Arizona Colt, Vengeance Is Mine, Ten Thousand Dollars for a Massacre, The Ugly Ones, Dead Men Don't Count, and Any Gun Can Play. In The Great Silence and A Minute to Pray, a Second to Die, the heroes instead fight bounty killers. During this era, many heroes and villains in spaghetti Westerns began carrying a musical watch, after its use in For a Few Dollars More.

Spaghetti Westerns also began featuring a pair of different heroes. In Leone's film, Eastwood's character is an unshaven bounty hunter, dressed similarly to his character in A Fistful of Dollars, who enters an unstable partnership with Colonel Mortimer (Lee Van Cleef), an older bounty killer who uses more sophisticated weaponry and wears a suit, and, in the end, turns out to also be an avenger. In the following years, there was a deluge of spaghetti Westerns with a pair of heroes with (most often) conflicting motives. Examples include a lawman and an outlaw (And the Crows Will Dig Your Grave), an army officer and an outlaw (Bury Them Deep), an avenger and a (covert) army officer (The Hills Run Red), an avenger and a (covert) guilty party (Viva! Django aka W Django!), an avenger and a con-man (The Dirty Outlaws), an outlaw posing as a sheriff and a bounty hunter (Man With the Golden Pistol aka Doc, Hands of Steel), and an outlaw posing as his twin and a bounty hunter posing as a sheriff (A Few Dollars for Django).

The theme of age in For a Few Dollars More, in which the younger bounty killer learns valuable lessons from his more experienced colleague and eventually becomes his equal, is taken up in Day of Anger and Death Rides a Horse. In both cases, Lee Van Cleef continues as the older hero against Giuliano Gemma and John Phillip Law, respectively.

==== Zapata Westerns ====
One variant of the hero pair was a revolutionary Mexican bandit and a mostly money-oriented American from the American frontier. These films are sometimes called Zapata Westerns. The first was Damiano Damiani's A Bullet for the General and then followed Sergio Sollima's trilogy: The Big Gundown, Face to Face, and Run, Man, Run.

Sergio Corbucci's The Mercenary and Compañeros and Tepepa by Giulio Petroni are also considered Zapata Westerns. Many of these films enjoyed both strong box-office returns and critical attention. They are often interpreted as a leftist critique of the typical Hollywood handling of the Mexican Revolution, and of imperialism in general.

=== The Good, the Bad and the Ugly and universal betrayal ===
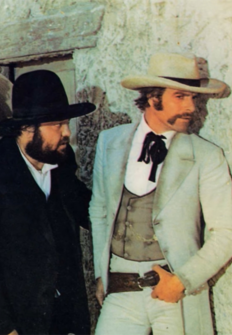
Gianni Garko and Cris Huerta in His Name Was Holy Ghost by Giuliano Carnimeo

In Leone's The Good, the Bad and the Ugly, the scheme of a pair of heroes vs. a villain remains, but it is somewhat relaxed, as all three parties are driven by money. In subsequent films such as Any Gun Can Play (whose Italian title, "Vado... l'ammazzo e torno", is itself a quote from Leone's film), One Dollar Too Many, and Kill Them All and Come Back Alone, several main characters repeatedly form alliances and betray each other for monetary gain.

Sabata and If You Meet Sartana Pray for Your Death, directed by Gianfranco Parolini, introduce a type of hero molded on the Mortimer character from For a Few Dollars More into similar betrayal environments, only without any vengeance motive and with more outrageous trick weapons. Sabata is portrayed by Lee Van Cleef himself, while John Garko plays the very similar Sartana protagonist. Parolini made some more Sabata movies, while Giuliano Carnimeo made a whole series of Sartana films, at first with Garko and later with George Hilton.

=== Django and the tragic hero ===
Besides the first three spaghetti Westerns by Leone, a most influential film was Sergio Corbucci's Django, starring Franco Nero. Django was one of the most violent spaghetti Westerns. The titular character is torn between several motives—money or revenge—and his choices bring misery to him and to a woman close to him. Indicative of this film's influence on the spaghetti Western style, "Django" is the hero's name in a plenitude of subsequent Westerns.

Although his character is not named Django, Franco Nero brings a similar ambiance to Texas, Adios and Massacre Time, in which the hero must confront surprising and dangerous family relations. Similar "prodigal son" stories followed, including Chuck Moll, Keoma, The Return of Ringo, The Forgotten Pistolero, One Thousand Dollars on the Black, Johnny Hamlet and also Seven Dollars on the Red.

Another type of wronged hero is set up and must clear his name. Giuliano Gemma starred in a series of successful films carrying this theme—Adiós gringo, For a Few Extra Dollars, Long Days of Vengeance, Wanted and, to some extent, Blood for a Silver Dollar—in which his character is most often called "Gary".

The wronged hero who becomes an avenger appears in many spaghetti Westerns. Among the more commercially successful films with a hero dedicated to vengeance—For a Few Dollars More, Once Upon a Time in the West, Today We Kill... Tomorrow We Die!, A Reason to Live, a Reason to Die, Death Rides a Horse, Django, Prepare a Coffin, The Deserter, Hate for Hate, and Halleluja for Django—those with whom he cooperates typically have conflicting motivations.

=== "Trinity" films and the triumph of comedy ===
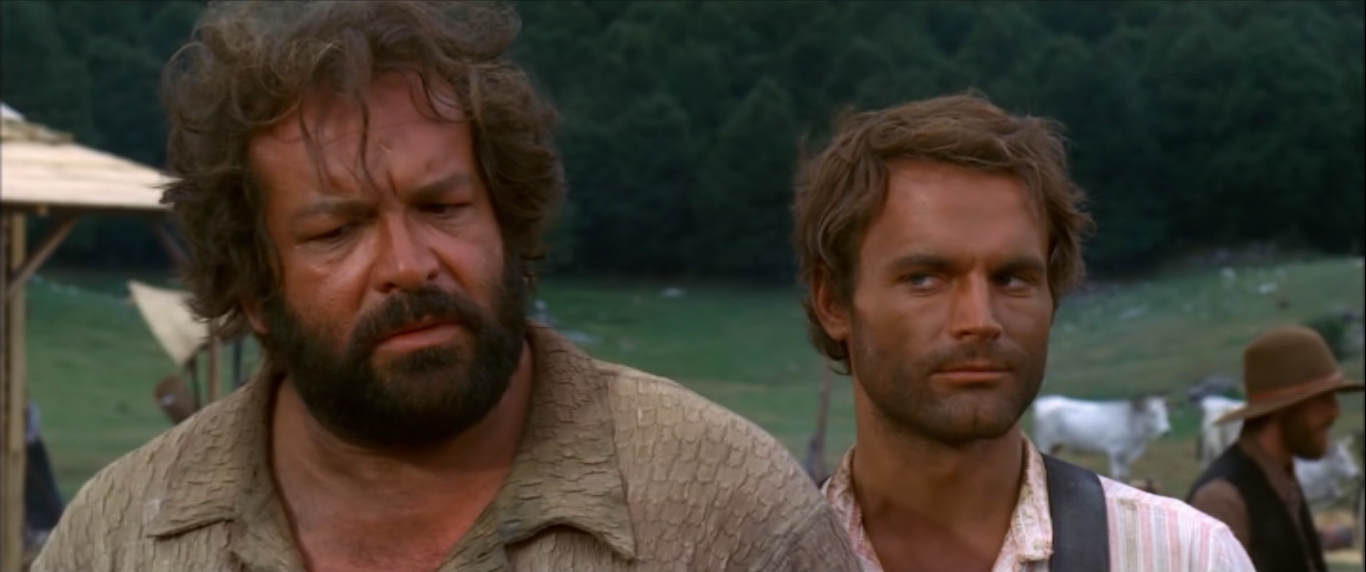
Bud Spencer and Terence Hill in They Call Me Trinity by Enzo Barboni

In 1968, the wave of spaghetti Westerns reached its crest, comprising one-third of the Italian film production, only to collapse to one-tenth in 1969. However, the considerable box-office success of Enzo Barboni's They Call Me Trinity and its enormously successful follow-up, Trinity Is Still My Name, gave Italian filmmakers a new model to emulate. The main characters were played by Terence Hill and Bud Spencer, who had already cooperated as a pair of heroes in three earlier spaghetti Westerns, God Forgives... I Don't!, Boot Hill and Ace High, directed by Giuseppe Colizzi. The humor started in those movies, with comedy-fighting scenes, but the Barboni films became burlesque comedies. They feature the quick but lazy Trinity (Hill) and his big, strong, and irritable brother, Bambino (Spencer).

The stories lampoon stereotypical Western characters, such as diligent farmers, lawmen, and bounty hunters. There was a wave of Trinity-inspired films with quick and strong heroes, the former often called "Trinity", or coming from "a place called Trinity", and with few or no killings. Because the two model stories featured religious pacifists to explain the lack of gunplay, all successors included religious groups, or at least priests, sometimes as one of the heroes.

The music for the two Trinity Westerns (composed by Franco Micalizzi and Guido & Maurizio De Angelis, respectively) also reflected a shift to a lighter, more sentimental mood. The Trinity-inspired films also adopted this less serious and often-maligned style.

Some critics deplore these post-Trinity films and their soundtracks as a degeneration of the "real" spaghetti Westerns. Indeed, Hill's and Spencer's skillful use of body language was a hard act to follow, and it is significant that the most successful of the post-Trinity films featured Hill (Man of the East and A Genius, Two Partners and a Dupe), Spencer (It Can Be Done Amigo), and a pair of Hill-Spencer lookalikes in Carambola. A spaghetti Western old hand, Franco Nero, also worked in this subgenre with Cipolla Colt, and Tomas Milian plays an outrageous "quick" bounty hunter modeled on Charlie Chaplin's Little Tramp in Sometimes Life Is Hard, Eh Providence? and Here We Go Again, Eh, Providence?.

=== Twilight of the genre ===
Terence Hill could still draw large audiences in a post-Trinity Western, My Name Is Nobody, with Henry Fonda, and a caper-story Western, A Genius, Two Partners and a Dupe. In 1976, Franco Nero achieved a similar draw as a Django-style hero in Keoma. However, by the end of the 1970s, the different types of spaghetti Westerns had lost their following among mainstream cinema audiences, and production ground to a virtual halt. Belated attempts to revive the genre included the comedy film Buddy Goes West, the Spanish-American coproduction Comin' at Ya!, which was shot in 3D, and Django Strikes Again.

== Other notable themes ==
=== "Cult" spaghetti Westerns ===
Some movies that were not very successful at the box office still earn a "cult" status in some segment of the audience because of certain extraordinary features in story and/or presentation. One "cult" spaghetti Western that has also drawn attention from critics is Giulio Questi's Django Kill. Other "cult" items are Cesare Canevari's Matalo!, Tony Anthony's Blindman, and Joaquín Luis Romero Marchent's Cut-Throats Nine (the latter among gore film audiences).

=== Historical backgrounds ===
The few spaghetti Westerns containing historical characters such as Buffalo Bill, Wyatt Earp, Billy the Kid, etc., appear mainly before A Fistful of Dollars had put its mark on the genre. Likewise, and in contrast to the contemporary German Westerns, few films feature Native Americans. When they appear, they are more often portrayed as victims of discrimination than as dangerous foes. The only fairly successful spaghetti Western with a Native American main character (played by Burt Reynolds in his only European Western outing) is Sergio Corbucci's Navajo Joe, in which the (supposedly) Navajo village is wiped out by bandits during the first minutes, and the avenger hero spends the rest of the film dealing mostly with Anglos and Mexicans until the final showdown at a Native American burial ground.

=== Ancient myths and classic literature ===
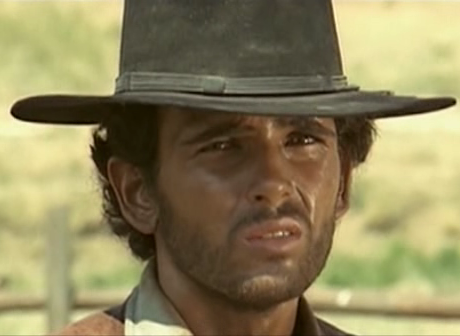
The Forgotten Pistolero by Ferdinando Baldi

Several spaghetti Westerns are inspired by classical myths and dramas. Titles, such as Fedra West (also called Ballad of a Bounty Hunter) and Johnny Hamlet, signify the connection to Greek myth, the plays by Euripides and Racine, and the play by William Shakespeare, respectively. The latter also inspired 1972's Dust in the Sun, which follows the original more closely than Johnny Hamlet, in which the hero survives. The Forgotten Pistolero is based on the vengeance of Orestes. There are similarities between the story of The Return of Ringo and the last canto of Homer's Odyssey. Fury of Johnny Kid follows Shakespeare's Romeo and Juliet, but (again) with a different ending; the loving couple leaves together while their families annihilate each other.

=== Musicals ===
Some Italian Western films were made as vehicles for musical stars, such as Ferdinando Baldi's Rita of the West, featuring Rita Pavone and Terence Hill. In non-singing roles were Ringo Starr as a villain in Blindman and French rock 'n' roll veteran Johnny Hallyday as the gunfighter and avenger hero in Sergio Corbucci's The Specialists.

=== East Asian connections ===
The story of A Fistful of Dollars was closely based on Akira Kurosawa's Yojimbo. Kurosawa sued Sergio Leone for plagiarism and was compensated with the exclusive distribution rights to the movie in Japan, where its hero, Clint Eastwood, was already a huge star due to the popularity of the TV series, Rawhide. Leone would have done far better financially by obtaining Kurosawa's advance permission to use Yojimbo's script. Requiem for a Gringo shows many traces from another well-known Japanese film, Masaki Kobayashi's Harakiri.

When Asian martial arts films started to draw crowds in European cinema houses, the producers of spaghetti Westerns tried to hang on, this time not by adapting storylines, but rather by directly including martial arts in the films, performed by Eastern actors—for example, Chen Lee in My Name Is Shanghai Joe, or Lo Lieh teaming up with Lee Van Cleef in The Stranger and the Gunfighter.

=== Political allegories ===
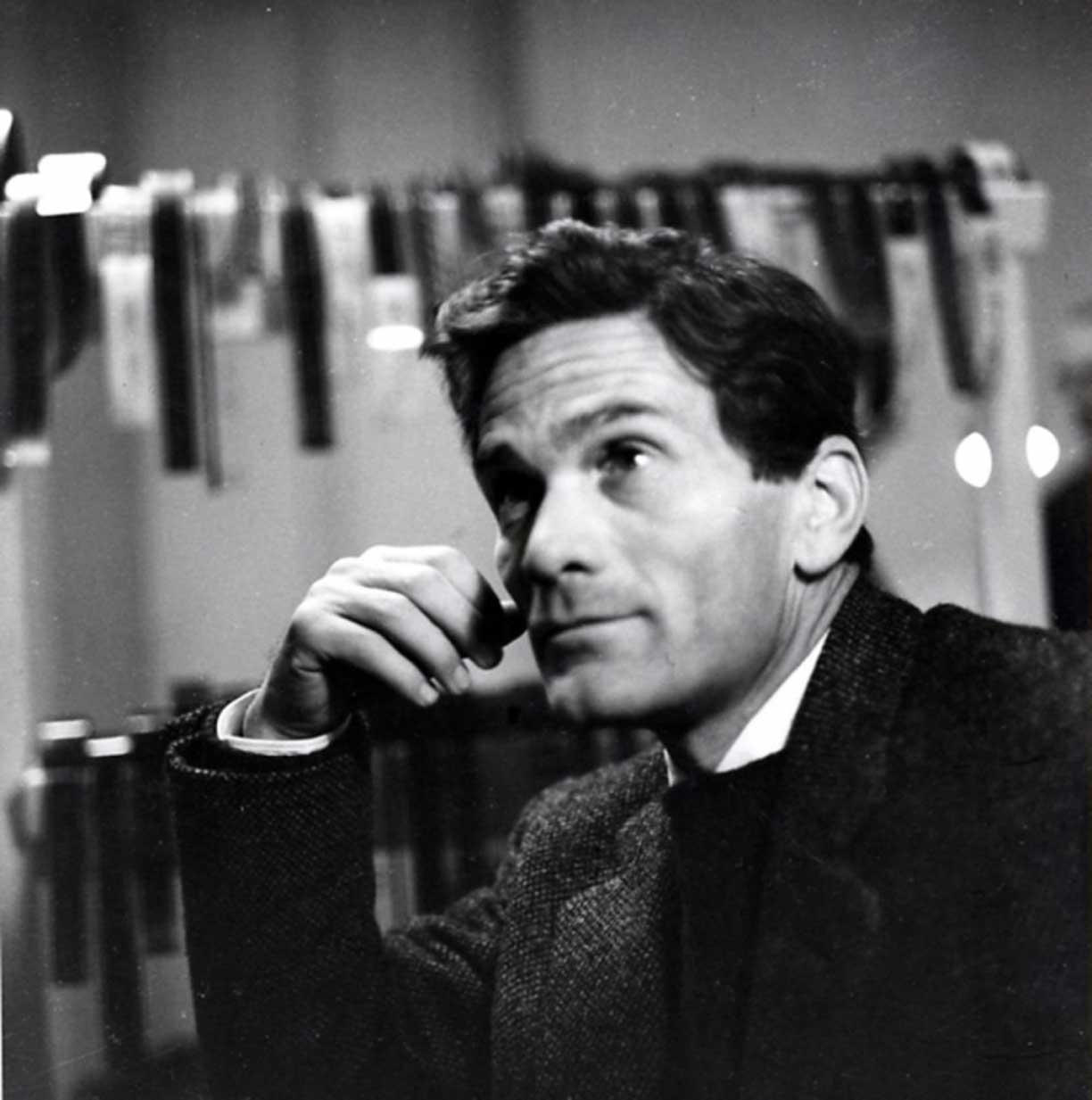
Pier Paolo Pasolini

Some spaghetti Westerns incorporate political overtones, particularly from the political left. One example is Requiescant, which features Italian author and film director Pier Paolo Pasolini as a major supporting character. Pasolini's character is a priest who espouses Liberation theology. The film concerns the oppression of poor Mexicans by rich Anglos and ends with a call to arms, but it does not fit easily as a Zapata Western, as it lacks the typical hero pair of a flamboyant Latin revolutionary and an Anglo specialist. The Price of Power serves a political allegory about the assassination of John F. Kennedy and racism. The movie concerns the assassination of an American president in Dallas, Texas, by a group of Southern white supremacists who frame an innocent African-American. They are opposed by an unstable partnership between a whistleblower (Giuliano Gemma) and a political aide.

=== Homosexuality ===
Although it is intimated in some films, such as Django Kill, Requiescant and The Reward's Yours... The Man's Mine, open homosexuality plays a marginal part in spaghetti Westerns. An exception is Giorgio Capitani's The Ruthless Four (in effect a gay version of John Huston's The Treasure of the Sierra Madre), in which the explicit homosexual relationship between two of its male main characters and some gay cueing scenes are embedded with other forms of male relations throughout the story.

== Reception ==
In the 1960s, critics recognized that the American genres were rapidly changing. The most identifiably American genre, the Western, seemed to be evolving into a new, rougher form. For many critics, Sergio Leone's films were part of the problem. Leone's Dollars Trilogy (1964–1966) was not the beginning of the "spaghetti Western" cycle in Italy, but for some Americans, Leone's films represented the true beginning of the Italian invasion of an American genre.

Christopher Frayling, in his noted book on the Italian Western, describes American critical reception of the spaghetti Western cycle as, to "a large extent, confined to a sterile debate about the 'cultural roots' of the American/Hollywood Western". He remarked that few critics dared admit that they were, in fact, "bored with an exhausted Hollywood genre".

Frayling noted that Pauline Kael was willing to acknowledge this critical ennui, and thus appreciate how a film like Akira Kurosawa's Yojimbo "could exploit the conventions of the Western genre, while debunking its morality". Frayling and other film scholars, such as Bondanella, argue that this revisionism was the key to Leone's success, and, to some degree, to that of the spaghetti Western genre as a whole.

== Legacy ==
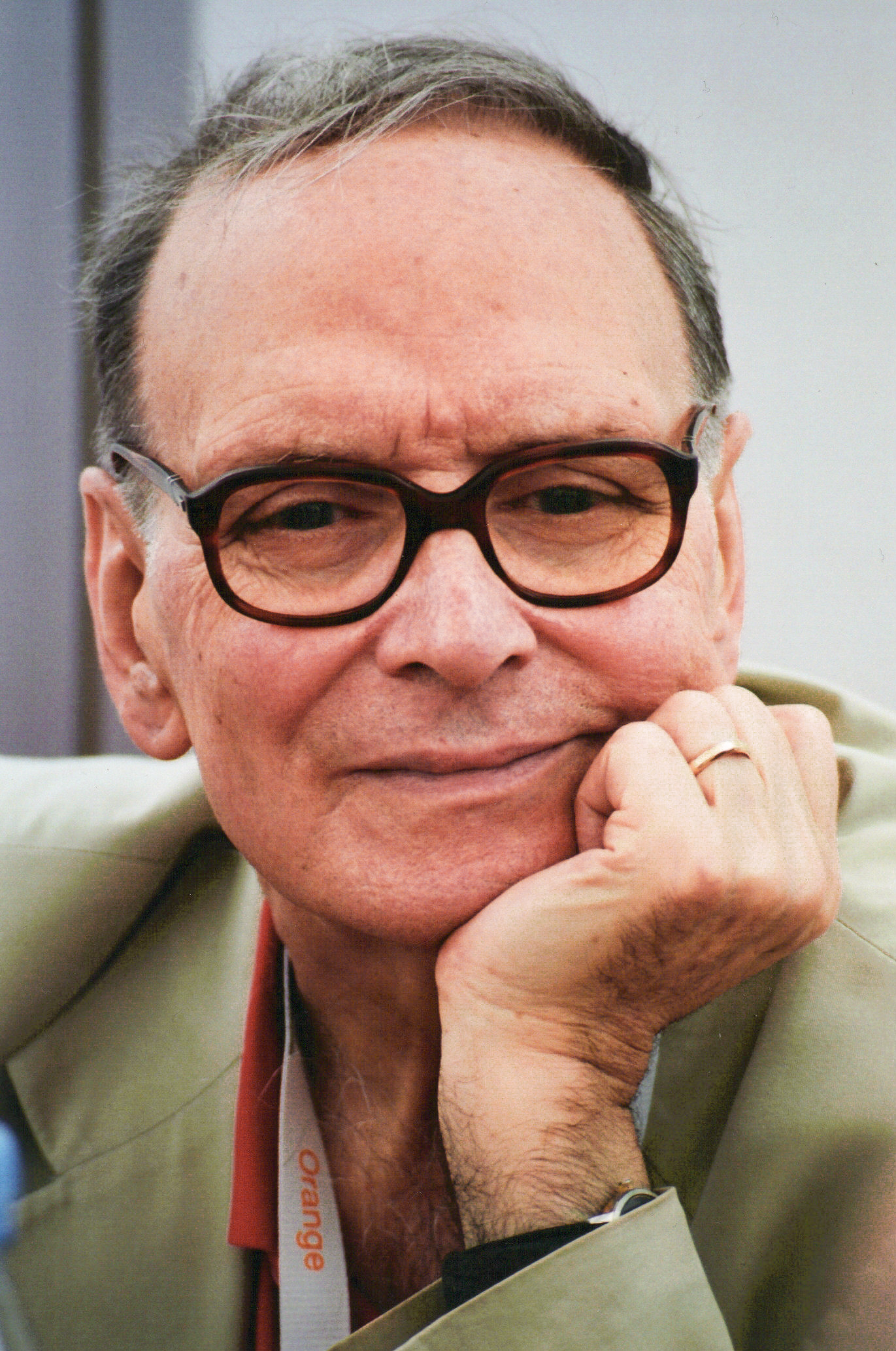
Ennio Morricone's (pictured) composition "The Ecstasy of Gold" from The Good, the Bad and the Ugly by Sergio Leone is used by American metal band Metallica to open several of their concerts.

Spaghetti Westerns have left their mark on popular culture, strongly influencing numerous works produced in and outside of Italy. In later years, there were the "return-of stories" films Django Strikes Again with Franco Nero and Troublemakers with Terence Hill and Bud Spencer. Clint Eastwood's first American Western film, Hang 'Em High, incorporates elements of spaghetti Westerns.

American director Quentin Tarantino has utilized elements of spaghetti Westerns in his films Kill Bill (combined with kung fu movies), Inglourious Basterds (set in Nazi-occupied France), Django Unchained (set in the American South during the time of slavery), The Hateful Eight (set in Wyoming after the US Civil War), and Once Upon a Time in Hollywood (about fictional American actor Rick Dalton sometimes working in spaghetti Westerns).

The Back to the Future trilogy pays homage to spaghetti Westerns (especially Sergio Leone's Dollars Trilogy) on several occasions, most notably in the third film. The American animated film Rango incorporates elements of spaghetti Westerns, including a character (the mystical "Spirit of the West", regarded as a sort of deity among the characters) appearing to the protagonist as an elderly Man with No Name. The 1985 Japanese film Tampopo was promoted as a "ramen Western". Japanese director Takashi Miike paid tribute to the genre with Sukiyaki Western Django, a Western set in Japan that derives influence from both Django and the Dollars Trilogy.

The Bollywood film Sholay was often referred to as a "Curry Western". A more accurate genre label for the film is the "Dacoit Western", as it combined the conventions of Indian dacoit films, such as Mother India and Gunga Jumna, with that of spaghetti Westerns. Sholay spawned its own genre of "Dacoit Western" films in Bollywood during the 1970s.

In the Soviet Union, the spaghetti Western was adapted into the Ostern ("Eastern") genre of Soviet films. The Wild West setting was replaced by an Eastern setting in the steppes of the Caucasus, while Western stock characters, such as "cowboys and Indians", were replaced by Caucasian stock characters, such as bandits and harems. A famous example of the genre was White Sun of the Desert, which was popular in the Soviet Union.

American heavy metal band Metallica has used Ennio Morricone's composition, "The Ecstasy of Gold", from The Good, the Bad and the Ugly, to open several of their concerts. An Australian band, the Tango Saloon, combined elements of tango music with influences from spaghetti Western scores. The band Ghoultown also derives influence from spaghetti Westerns. The music video for the song "Knights of Cydonia", by the English rock band Muse, is influenced by spaghetti Westerns. The band Big Audio Dynamite used music samples from spaghetti Westerns when mixing their song "Medicine Show". Within the song, there are samples from spaghetti Western movies such as A Fistful of Dollars, The Good, the Bad and the Ugly, and Duck, You Sucker!.

Video game studio Rockstar Games used aspects of the spaghetti western and paid homage to it in its Red Dead series.

=== Retrospective of the Venice Film Festival ===
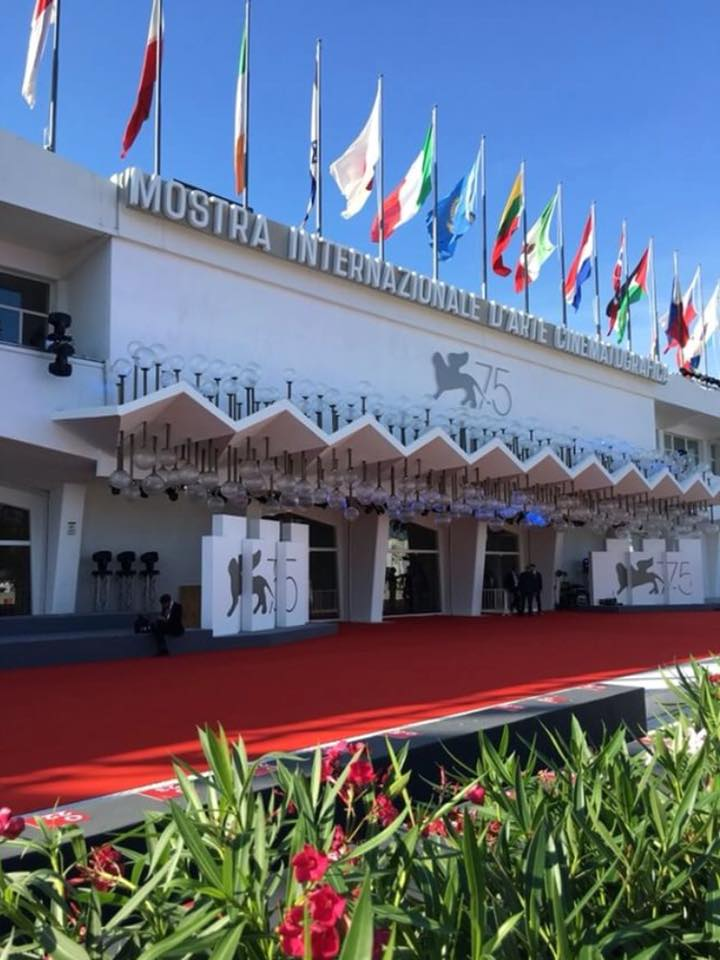
The Venice Film Festival, the world's oldest film festival and one of the "Big Five" international film festivals worldwide, which include the Big Three European Film Festivals alongside the Toronto Film Festival in Canada and the Sundance Film Festival in the United States

In 2007, a retrospective took place as part of the Venice International Film Festival to pay homage to the genre. The retrospective included 32 films:

- The Seven from Texas (1964) by Joaquin Luis Romero Marchent
- 100.000 dollari per Ringo (1965) by Alberto De Martino
- The Return of Ringo (1965) by Duccio Tessari
- Savage Gringo (1965) by Mario Bava and Antonio Román
- Blood for a Silver Dollar (1965) by Giorgio Ferroni
- Django (1965) - Full version - by Sergio Corbucci
- The Ugly Ones (1966) by Eugenio Martin
- The Big Gundown (1966) by Sergio Sollima
- Navajo Joe (1966) by Sergio Corbucci
- Sugar Colt (1966) by Franco Giraldi
- The Hills Run Red (1966) by Carlo Lizzani
- Yankee (1966) by Tinto Brass
- Ten Thousand Dollars for a Massacre (1967) by Romolo Guerrieri
- The Dirty Outlaws (1967) by Franco Rossetti
- Il tempo degli avvoltoi (1967) by Nando Cicero
- La morte non conta i dollari (1967) by Riccardo Freda
- Django Kill... If You Live, Shoot! (1967) - Full version - by Giulio Questi
- The Ruthless Four (1967) by Giorgio Capitani
- Django, Prepare a Coffin (1967) by Ferdinando Baldi
- Tepepa (1968) by Giulio Petroni
- A Noose for Django (1968) by Sergio Garrone
- And God Said to Cain (1969) by Antonio Margheriti
- The Reward's Yours... The Man's Mine (1969) by Edoardo Mulargia
- They Call Me Trinity (1970) by Enzo Barboni
- Matalo! (1970) by Cesare Canevari
- Compañeros (1970) by Sergio Corbucci
- Vengeance Is a Dish Served Cold (1971) by Pasquale Squitieri
- The Grand Duel (1972) by Giancarlo Santi
- The Fighting Fist of Shanghai Joe (1973) by Mario Caiano
- A Reason to Live, a Reason to Die (1973) by Tonino Valerii
- Four of the Apocalypse (1975) by Lucio Fulci
- Keoma (1976) by Enzo Castellari

== See also ==
- List of spaghetti Western filmmakers
- Cinema of Italy
- List of spaghetti Westerns
- Co-productions in Spanish cinema
- Ostern
- Revisionist Western
- ZWAM, a youth movement in Madagascar inspired by spaghetti Westerns
- Bang! (card game), inspired by the genre
- Manchurian Western, Western-style South Korean films set in Manchuria
  - The Good, the Bad, the Weird - a 2008 South Korean Western action film
  - Dachimawa Lee

== Bibliography ==
- Fisher, Austin (2011). Radical Frontiers in the Spaghetti Western: Politics, Violence and Popular Italian Cinema. New York: I.B. Tauris & Co Ltd. ISBN 978-1-84885-578-6.
- Frayling, Christopher (2006). Spaghetti westerns: cowboys and Europeans from Karl May to Sergio Leone (Revised paperback ed.). London, New York:I.B. Tauris & Co Ltd. ISBN 978-1-84511-207-3.
- Frayling, Christopher (2000). Sergio Leone: Something to Do with Death. London: Faber.
- Fridlund, Bert (2006). The Spaghetti Western. A Thematic Analysis. Jefferson, NC and London: McFarland & Company Inc.
- Gale, Richard (Winter 2003). "Spaghetti Westerns: Cowboys and Europeans from Karl May to Sergio Leone". Journal of Popular Film & Television. 30 (4): 231. ProQuest 199355725.
- Liehm, Mira (1984). Passion and Defiance: Film in Italy from 1942 to the Present. Berkeley: U of California P.
- Haas, Alessandra Magrin (2022). "Silent Westerns Made in Italy: The Dawn of a Transnational Genre between US Imperial Narratives and Nationalistic Appropriations". In Mayer, Hervé; Roche, David (eds.). Transnationalism and Imperialism: Endurance of the Global Western Film. Bloomington IN: University of Indiana Press. pp. 164–178. ISBN 978-0-253-06075-4.
- McClain, William (2010). "Western, Go Home! Sergio Leone and the 'Death of the Western' in American Film Criticism". Journal of Film and Video. 6 (1/2): 52–66. doi:10.5406/jfilmvideo.62.1-2.0052.
- Riling, Yngve P (2011). The Spaghetti Western Bible. Limited Edition. Riling.
- Weisser, Thomas (1992). Spaghetti Westerns: the Good, the Bad and the Violent — 558 Eurowesterns and Their Personnel, 1961–1977. Jefferson, N.C.: McFarland.
