= Beba Lončar =

Serbian actress

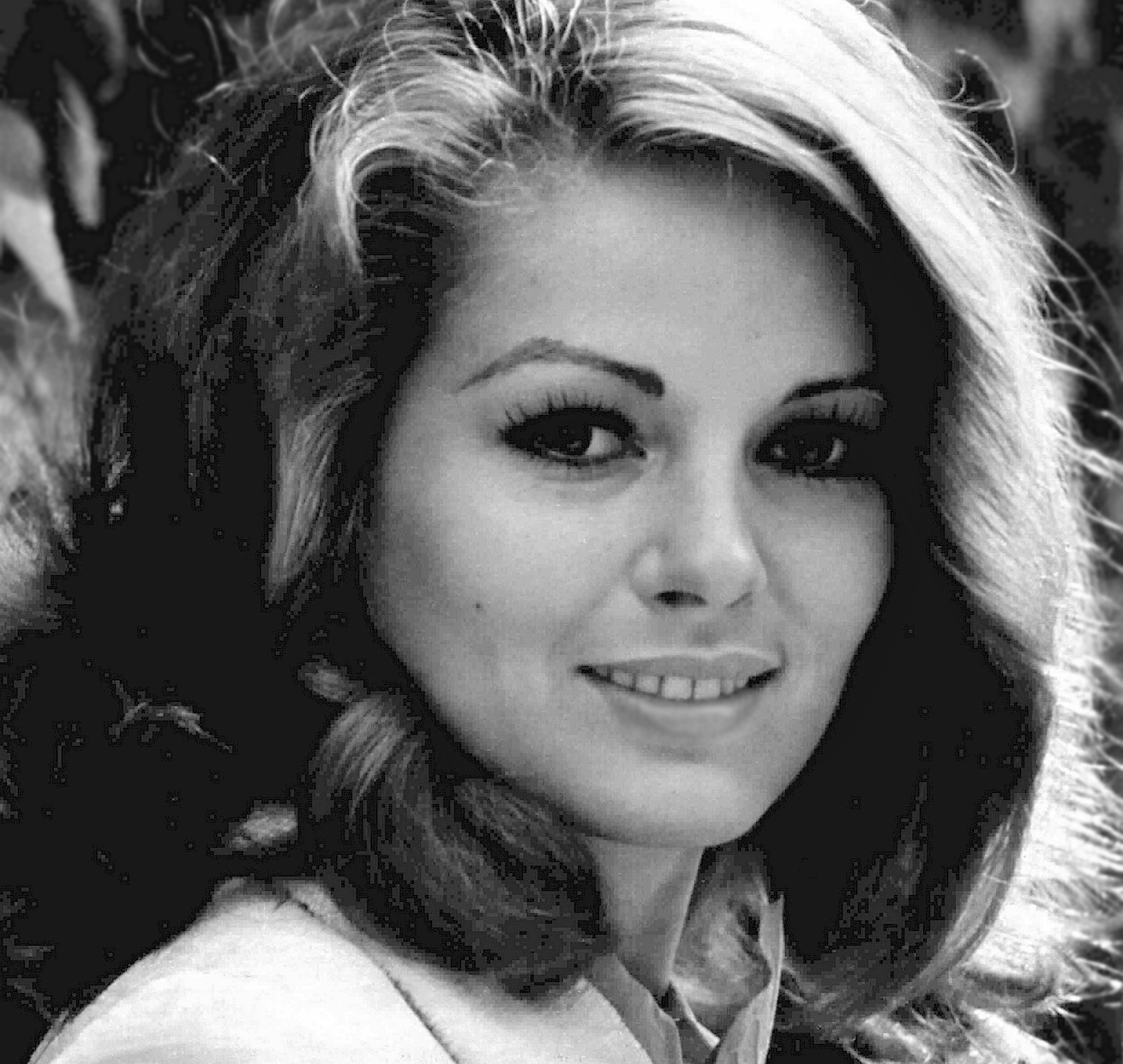
- Lončar in 1974
- Born: Desanka Lončar; 28 April 1943 (age 83); Belgrade, German-occupied Serbia
- Occupation: Actress
- Years active: 1960–1983

Desanka "Beba" Lončar (Serbian Cyrillic: Десанка „Беба“ Лончар; born 28 April 1943) is a former Yugoslav and Serbian film actress. She appeared in 52 films between 1960 and 1982. She was born in Belgrade, Serbia. Known for her film career during the 1960s and 1970s, she first became a star in native Yugoslavia before moving to Italy where she achieved considerable success.

== Early life ==
Lončar was born on 28 April 1943 in Belgrade, war-torn Serbia, and grew up in Belgrade's neighbourhood of Dorćol. Lončar became involved with performing at an early age. During the late 1950s she was given on-camera speaking bits in kids' and youth programmes on the newly launched TV Belgrade. She studied acting under the tutelage of director Soja Jovanović who gave Lončar her film debut—an uncredited bit part in 1960's Diližansa snova.

== Career ==
=== Debut ===
Lončar's acting break came via being cast, alongside two more first-time film performers: twenty-year-old Boris Dvornik and fifteen-year-old Dušica Žegarac, in France Štiglic's Deveti krug, a Jadran Film-produced Holocaust story about a Jewish family from Zagreb. The film would go on to achieve notable critical success.

By the time Deveti krug was released, sixteen-year-old Lončar had already landed her first lead role—the part of a beautiful young girl Sonja Ilić in the teenage comedy Ljubav i moda produced by Avala Film.

=== Early career in Yugoslavia ===
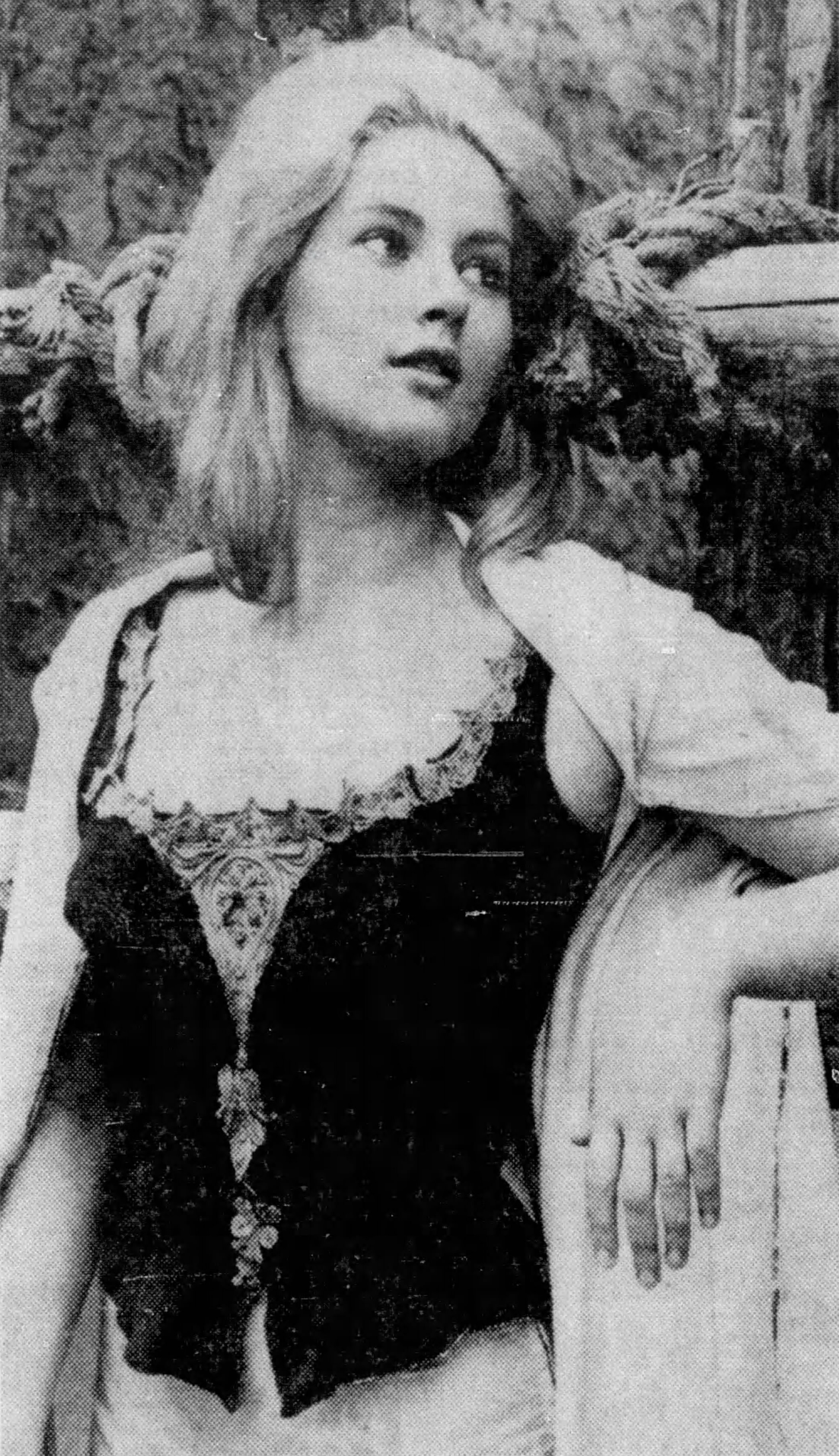
Lončar in 1963

Deveti krug premiered in late April 1960 to good reviews. Although the lead role of Ruth Alkalaj went to another teenage upstart—Dušica Žegarac—Lončar's portrayal of Magda also received very positive notices. The film got selected for competition at the 1960 Cannes Film Festival during May with Lončar and Žegarac, both still high school students, getting their first taste of glitz and glamour as they made the rounds at the festival. Several months later in August, the film won the Golden Arena award at the 1960 Pula Film Festival in addition to becoming Yugoslav official submission for the best foreign movie and actually getting nominated for the Best Foreign Language Film at the 33rd Academy Awards.

Later that fall Ljubav i moda (Love and Fashion) came out, creating a sensation the likes of which hadn't been seen in the country to date. Backed by a pop music soundtrack that achieved its own popularity on the strength of the "Devojko mala" track sung by Đuza Stojiljković, the cheeky picture became a commercial smash hit in communist Yugoslavia. Though a decision was made by the film's director and producers for teenage Lončar's voice to be dubbed by the twenty-nine-year-old actress Olga Stanisavljević, the youngster still successfully carried the breezy comedy alongside Dušan Bulajić as well as established stars of Yugoslav cinema Miodrag Petrović Čkalja and Mija Aleksić. The general audiences responded well to the teenager's beauty and youthful charm, making her an overnight star in the country and paving the way for her subsequent movie career. She would reveal in interviews decades later that she purchased a Mercedes car and mink coat with the money she made from Ljubav i moda.

Film crews from all over the world were coming to Yugoslavia because of stunt people and good working conditions. However, when it came to roles and salaries in those productions, Yugoslav actors were relegated to the second tier. Still, Bekim Fehmiu and myself managed to get some notable roles abroad. I don't want to come off pretentious, but it's a fact that from the early 1960s until the 1980s the two of us managed to make decent European careers for ourselves.

— Lončar in a 2010 interview.

With only two films under her belt, by the end of 1960, seventeen-year-old Lončar's cinematic profile was raised beyond all expectations. She additionally signed a five-year contract with Avala Film, and its executive Ratko Dražević had begun guiding her career. She next got cast as the female lead in Aleksandar Petrović's directorial debut—Avala Film-produced romantic drama Dvoje—alongside Miha Baloh and Miloš Žutić. Playing the role of mysteriously flirtatious Belgrade girl Jovana Zrnić, she once again got plenty of positive reactions in the press. The movie got released in late July 1961, and the following year got selected for the competition programme at Cannes. Although it ended up not quite matching the success of Deveti krug on the festival circuit, Dvoje got very good reviews for its innovative approach as a breath of fresh air in the Yugoslav cinema that up to that point had mostly been making genre films of very specific and rigid structure and narrative. The movie also marked the first time Lončar was officially billed using her nickname "Beba" rather than her given first name, a practice that would be continued for the remainder of her career.

Already a bona fide film star in Yugoslavia as well as a nationwide sex symbol, Lončar started getting parts in Avala Film co-productions with foreign production companies being shot in Yugoslavia. Franz Antel cast her in the supporting role of Afra in the Austrian movie The Bandit and the Princess, marking the first time she took part in a foreign film. Following a few more Yugoslav movies where she had notable roles—Soja Jovanović's comedy Dr based on Branislav Nušić's eponymous novel and Zdravko Randić's Zemljaci—Lončar took a supporting part in the high-budget British-Yugoslav over-the-top adventure co-production The Long Ships directed by Jack Cardiff and starring Richard Widmark, Sidney Poitier, Russ Tamblyn and Rosanna Schiaffino, that was entirely shot in Yugoslavia. She reportedly got the role of Gerda after another actress that had already been cast for the role abruptly left the set. Forced to scramble, Cardiff looked for a local replacement and ended up casting blonde Lončar whose physical features fit the requirements of the Viking woman role.

Another foreign production in Yugoslavia Lončar took part in was the West German-funded musical western Freddy in the Wild West, directed by Sobey Martin, with the young actress in the female lead role opposite Austrian singer-actor Freddy Quinn. In between she also starred along with Milena Dravić (another young Belgrade actress whose career path resembled Lončar's) as well Ljubiša Samardžić, Boris Dvornik, and Miki Mićović in a romantic summer youth comedy Lito vilovito about local boys from the Dalmatian coastline seducing young tourist girls.

=== Italian period ===
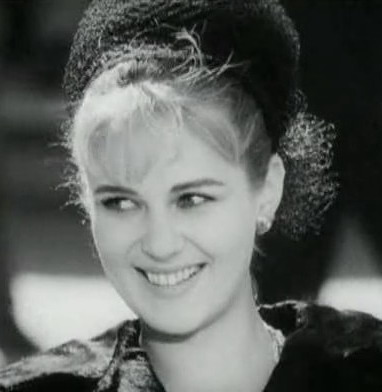
Lončar in The Birds, the Bees and the Italians (1966)

Lončar's career in the Italian cinema began in 1964 when she was cast by Mauro Bolognini for his segment within La donna è una cosa meravigliosa, a three-segment film. According to Yugoslav press reports, her initial appearance in Italian movies was facilitated by Avala Film chairman Dražević who had many connections within Italian film industry. At only twenty-one years of age she moved to Rome and continued acting in Italian films.

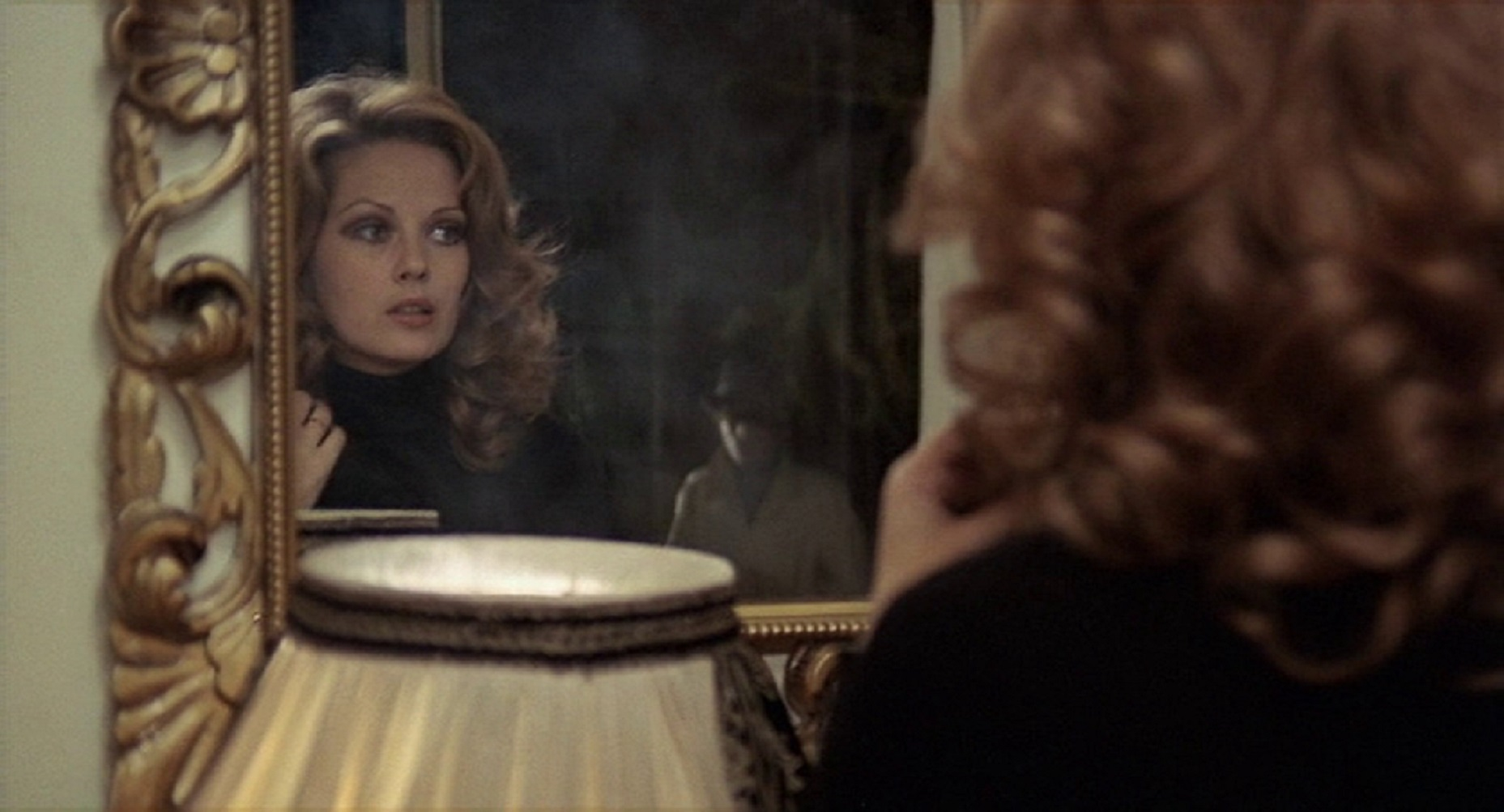
Loncar in Who Killed the Prosecutor and Why? (1972)

The year 1965 was a breakout one for Lončar in Italy as she appeared in six films. In early spring, Carlo Lizzani's La Celestina P... R... premiered where she had a sizable role followed by a bit part in Gérard Oury's Le Corniaud and a bigger one in Steno's Letti sbagliati. The late summer saw her in Mario Monicelli's Casanova 70 playing one of Marcello Mastroianni's many love interests in the film followed by Luciano Salce's Slalom where Lončar and Daniela Bianchi appeared as tandem of temptresses weaving their web around the duo of pals, both of whom are married, played by Vittorio Gassman and Adolfo Celi. She rounded the year off with Massimo Franciosa's Il morbidone alongside Paolo Ferrari, Anouk Aimée, Sylva Koscina, and Margaret Lee.

Her early roles in Italy revealed a theme that would continue throughout her career in the country as Italian directors and producers generally cast her in roles of exotic and mysterious seductresses within the commedia all'italiana genre.

== Partial filmography ==
- The Ninth Circle (1960) - Magda
- Love and Fashion (1960) - Sonja Ilic
- And Love Has Vanished (1961) - Jovana Zrnic
- Medaljon sa tri srca (1962) - (segment "Prica2")
- Dr (1962) - Slavka Cvijovic
- The Bandit and the Princess (1962) - Afra
- Zemljaci (1963) - Jana
- The Long Ships (1964) - Gerda
- Ein Frauenarzt klagt an (1964) - Eva Möllmer
- Lito vilovito (1964) - May
- Freddy in the Wild West (1964) - Deputy Sheriff Anita Daniels
- La donna è una cosa meravigliosa (1964) - (segment "Una donna dolce, dolce")
- La Celestina P... R... (1965) - Luisella
- Le Corniaud (1965) - Ursula - la naturiste
- Letti sbagliati (1965) - Enrichetta Cordelli (segment "Quel porco di Maurizio")
- Casanova 70 (1965) - La ragazza del museo
- Slalom (1965) - Helen
- The Dreamer (1965) - Laura
- The Birds, the Bees and the Italians (1966) - Noemi Castellan
- The Boy Who Cried Murder (1966) - Susie
- In the Shadow of the Eagles (1966) - Helen
- Bitter Fruit (1967) - Tita
- Lucky, the Inscrutable (1967) - Beba
- Days of Violence (1967) - Christine Evans
- Soledad (1967)
- Massacre in the Black Forest (1967) - Livia
- Cover Girl (1968) - Anna
- The Fuller Report (1968) - Svetlana Golyadkin
- Frame Up (1968) - Janet
- Listen, Let's Make Love (1968) - Aunt Lidia
- Some Girls Do (1969) - Pandora
- Cuore di mamma (1969) - Magda Franti - Andrea's sister
- Sharon vestida de rojo (1969) - Sharon Adams
- Interrabang (1969) - Anna
- Pussycat, Pussycat, I Love You (1970) - Ornella
- Cerca di capirmi (1970) - Lz Sher
- Brancaleone at the Crusades (1970) - Berta d'Avignone
- Who Killed the Prosecutor and Why? (1972) - Olga
- Decameron's Jolly Kittens (1972) - Madonna Lydia (segment "The Magic Pear Tree")
- La ragazza dalla pelle di luna (1974) - Helen
- Ho incontrato un'ombra TV drama (1974) - Silvia Predal
- Percy is Killed (1976)
- Special Squad Shoots on Sight (1976) - Jane
- La donneuse (1976) - Françoise
- Quelle strane occasioni (1976) - Vedova Adami (segment "L'Ascensore")
- Ragazzo di borgata (1976)
- Gli uccisori (1977)
- Quella strana voglia d'amare (1977) - Claudia / teacher
- The Pals (1979) - Drugarica Tanja
- Drugarcine (1979) - Vera Djuric
- Sunday Lovers (1980) - Marisa (segment "Armando's Notebook")
- Don't Look in the Attic (1982) (aka The House of the Cursed Spirits, aka La villa delle anime maladette, aka House of the Damned, aka Evil Touch) - Martha

== Personal life ==
During the early 1970s, Lončar married the Croatian hospitality entrepreneur (nightclub owner), musician, and socialite Josip "Dikan" Radeljak, having met him in Split and gone through a short period of dating. The couple had a son Leo in 1982. After giving birth for the first time at the age of 39, Lončar decided to end her film career. Towards the late 1980s, the couple separated as Radeljak left Lončar for a younger actress, Ena Begović. Following a bitter court battle, their divorce was finalized in 1994 with Radeljak getting the custody of their only son.

During summer 2000, Lončar started living with Serbian skier Stevan Marinković Knićanin whom she eventually married. In late 2000, she moved from Rome back to her hometown Belgrade where she had lived ever since. She rarely makes media appearances.
