= List of horror films of 1962 =

A list of horror films released in 1962.

Horror films released in 1962
Title	Director	Cast	Country	Notes
The Awful Dr. Orloff	Jesús Franco	Riccardo Valle, Perla Cristal, Howard Vernon	France; Spain	
Beauty and the Beast	Edward L. Cahn	Joyce Taylor, Mark Damon	United States	
The Blancheville Monster (a.k.a. Horror)	Alberto De Martino	Gérard Tichy, Leo Anchóriz, Ombretta Colli	Italy	
The Brain That Wouldn't Die	Joseph Green	Jason Evers, Virginia Leith, Anthony La Penna	United States	
The Cabinet of Caligari	Roger Kay	Glynis Johns, Dick Davalos	United States	
Cape Fear	J. Lee Thompson	Gregory Peck, Robert Mitchum, Polly Bergen	United States	
Captain Clegg (a.k.a. Night Creatures)	Peter Graham Scott	Peter Cushing, Yvonne Romain, Patrick Allen	United Kingdom	
The Cursed Palace (a.k.a. Al Qasr Malaoon)	Hassan Reda	Salah Zulfikar, Mariam Fakhr Eddine	Egypt	
Carnival of Souls	Herk Harvey	Candace Hilligoss, Frances Feist, Sidney Berger	United States	
The Couch	Owen Crump	Grant Williams, Shirley Knight, Onslow Stevens	United States	
The Damned	Joseph Losey	Macdonald Carey, Shirley Anne Field, Viveca Lindfors, Alexander Knox, Oliver Reed	United Kingdom	
Hand of Death	Gene Nelson	John Agar, Paula Raymond, Stephen Dunne	United States	
Hands of a Stranger	Newt Arnold (as Newton Arnold)	Paul Lukather, Joan Harvey, James Stapleton	United States	
The Horrible Dr. Hichcock	Riccardo Freda	Barbara Steele, Robert Flemyng, Silvano Tranquilli	Italy	
Night of the Eagle (a.k.a. Burn, Witch, Burn)	Sidney Hayers	Janet Blair, Peter Wyngarde, Margaret Johnston	United Kingdom	Alternative titles Also known as Burn, Witch, Burn.
The Phantom of the Opera	Terence Fisher	Herbert Lom, Heather Sears, Thorley Walters	United Kingdom	
The Premature Burial	Roger Corman	Ray Milland, Hazel Court, Richard Ney	United States	
Slaughter of the Vampires	Roberto Mauri	Walter Bigari, Dieter Eppler, Graziella Granata	Italy	
Tales of Terror	Roger Corman	Vincent Price, Peter Lorre, Basil Rathbone	United States	
What Ever Happened to Baby Jane?	Robert Aldrich	Bette Davis, Joan Crawford, Victor Buono, Wesley Addy	United States	
Where the Truth Lies	Henri Decoin	Juliette Gréco, Jean-Marc Bory, Liselotte Pulver	France	

== Notes ==
=== References ===
- Curti, Roberto (2015). Italian Gothic Horror Films, 1957-1969. McFarland. ISBN 978-1476619897.
- Bennett, J. (2007). Science-fiction & Fantasy Cinema: Classic Films of Horror, Sci-fi & the Supernatural. Lulu.com. ISBN 978-1-4303-0113-4.
