= And Love Has Vanished =

1961 film

- Film poster
- Directed by: Aleksandar Petrović
- Written by: Aleksandar Petrović
- Starring: Beba Lončar
- Cinematography: Ivan Marinček
- Edited by: Mirjana Mitić
- Distributed by: Avala Film (in Yugoslavia)
- Release date: 31 July 1961
- Running time: 88 minutes
- Country: Yugoslavia
- Language: Serbo-Croatian

And Love Has Vanished (Serbian: Dvoje) is a 1961 Yugoslavian drama film directed by Aleksandar Petrović. It was entered into the 1962 Cannes Film Festival.

== Cast ==
- Beba Lončar - Jovana Zrnić
- Miha Baloh - Mirko
- Miloš Žutić - Dejan
- Borislav Radović
- Nada Kasapić
- Branka Palčić
- Dragan Vladić
