= The Gypsy Girl (film) =

- Directed by: Vojislav Nanović
- Written by: Borisav Stanković (novel); Aleksandar Vuco
- Cinematography: Milenko Stojanović
- Edited by: Milanka Nanović
- Music by: Dragutin Čolić
- Production company: Avala Film
- Release date: 1953
- Running time: 96 minutes
- Country: Yugoslavia
- Language: Serbo-Croat

The Gypsy Girl (Serbo-Croatian: Ciganka) is a 1953 Yugoslav drama film directed by Vojislav Nanović and starring Raša Plaović, Elma Karlowa and Milivoje Živanović.

== Cast ==
- Raša Plaović as Mitke
- Elma Karlowa as Kostana
- Milivoje Živanović as Hadži Toma
- Rastislav Jović as Stojan ... sin Hadži Tome
- Branko Đorđević as Arsa ... Predsednik opštine
- Bata Paskaljević
- Jovan Nikolić
- Aleksandar Stojković as Kosta
- Nada Škrinjar
- Divna Kostić as Salce ... Kostanina majka
- Mirko Milisavljević as Marko
- Pavle Vuisić as Guta
- Sima Janićijević as Kafedžija
- Janez Vrhovec as Bledi mladić
- Vladimir Medar
- Stanko Buhanac as Pisar u opštini
- Ljupka Višnjić

== Bibliography ==
- Cornis-Pope, Marcel & Neubauer, John. History of the Literary Cultures of East-Central Europe: Junctures and Disjunctures in the 19th and 20th Centuries: Types and Stereotypes. John Benjamins Publishing Company, 2010.
