= Vladimir Medar =

Croatian actor (1923–1978)

- Born: 1923; Zagreb, Kingdom of Serbs, Croats and Slovenes
- Died: 17 May 1978 (aged 54–55); Bela Crkva, SR Serbia, SFR Yugoslavia
- Occupation: Actor
- Years active: 1949 -1978 (film & TV)

Vladimir Medar (1923–1978) was a Croatian film and television actor. He played the title role in the 1962 Italian adventure film Taras Bulba, the Cossack.

== Selected filmography ==
- Barba Zvane (1949) - Stipe as partijac
- Jezero (1950)
- Bakonja fra Brne (1951) - Krsto
- The Gypsy Girl (1953)
- Esalon doktora M. (1955) - Saban
- Michel Strogoff (1956) - Aubergiste (uncredited)
- Poslednji kolosek (1956) - Masinovodja Djordje
- Cipelice na asfaltu (1956) - (segment "Gvozdeni orao")
- Potrazi Vandu Kos (1957) - Samac (uncredited)
- La Tour, prends garde ! (1958)
- Miss Stone (1958) - Golemiot Vezir
- Gospodja ministarka (1958)
- Tri Ane (1959) - Recepcioner hotela 'Istra' II
- Dilizansa snova (1960) - Gost u kafani (uncredited)
- Love and Fashion (1960) - Modni krojac II
- Zajednicki stan (1960) - Dragisa
- Prvi gradjanin male varosi (1961) - Predsednik druge opstine
- Solimano il conquistatore (1961) - Il Fabbro
- Taras Bulba, the Cossack (1962) - Taras Bulba
- Treasure of Silver Lake (1962) - Saloon-Wirt (uncredited)
- The Bandit and the Princess (1962) - Der Kramer Krummhändl
- Nevesinjska puska (1963) - Kapetan Tomas
- Le fils de Tarass Boulba (1964) - Boulba
- Grand Canyon Massacre (1964) - Harley Whitmore
- Freddy in the Wild West (1964) - Murdock, Perkins Henchman
- Among Vultures (1964) - Baker Sr. (uncredited)
- Fire Over Rome (1965) - Nero
- Old Surehand (1965) - Ben O'Brian
- Count Bobby, The Terror of The Wild West (1966) - Doc Ted W. Harper
- Do pobedata i po nea (1966) - Kmetot
- Winnetou and Old Firehand (1966) - Caleb
- In the Shadow of the Eagles (1966) - Magdo
- Fast ein Held (1967) - Bürgermeister
- The Blood Demon (1967) - Pater Fabian
- Day of Anger (1967) - Old Man Perkins (uncredited)
- Massacre in the Black Forest (1967)
- The Belle Starr Story (1968) - John Shelley
- Im Schloß der blutigen Begierde (1968) - Alecos
- Schamlos (1968) - Guido Romanelli
- The Valley of Death (1968) - Sheriff
- La porta del cannone (1969)
- Love and Some Swear Words (1969) - Leo Karpati
- The Way to Paradise (1970) - Ljekarnik
- Fiddler on the Roof (1971) - Priest
- Scalawag (1973) - Captain of the "Painted Lady" (uncredited)
- The Bloody Vultures of Alaska (1973) - Hotelist (uncredited)
- Anno Domini 1573 (1975) - Kovac
- The Rat Savior (1976) - Kupac knjiga
- Crazy Days (1977) - Profesor
- Operation Stadium (1977) - Magistar / Apotekar
- The Last Mission of Demolitions Man Cloud (1978) - Covjek sa stapom
- The Man to Destroy (1979) - Vijecnik u paklu

== Bibliography ==
- Roy Kinnard & Tony Crnkovich. Italian Sword and Sandal Films, 1908–1990. McFarland, 2017.
