= Remo De Angelis =

Italian film actor, stunt man, and painter (1926–2014)

- Born: July 30, 1926; Roccamonfina, Caserta, Italy
- Died: October 9, 2014 (aged 88); Rome, Italy
- Occupations: Film actor, stunt man and painter

Remo De Angelis (30 July 1926 – 9 October 2014) was an Italian film actor, stunt man and painter.

== Biography ==
De Angelis appeared in Nel Segno di Roma (1959), by Guido Brignone, and he played Prometheus in Maciste all'inferno (1962), by Riccardo Freda. He was the stunt coordinator in Taste for Killing (1968) by Tonino Valerii, where also played the vice sheriff, and he also played Mario Ansuini in My Dear Killer (1972). Others Spaghetti Western films including Clint the Nevada's Loner (1967), by Alfonso Balcázar, The Great Adventure (1975), by Gianfranco Baldanello, The Great Silence (1968), by Sergio Corbucci, Texas, Adios (1966), by Ferdinando Baldi, and The Unholy Four (1970), by Enzo Barboni.

De Angelis died in Rome on 9 October 2014, at the age of 88.

== Filmography ==
=== As actor ===
- The Mysterious Swordsman (1956)
- The Violent Patriot (1956)
- Sheba and the Gladiator (1959)
- The Night of the Great Attack (1959) as Fencing Master
- Hannibal (1959)
- Garibaldi (1961) as Giuseppe Missori
- The Witch's Curse (1962) as Prometheus
- Charge of the Black Lancers (1962) as Un ufficiale
- Fury of Achilles (1962) as Wrestler
- Duel at the Rio Grande (1963) as Luchador
- Ranch of the Ruthless (1965) as Michael
- Five Thousand Dollars on One Ace (1965)
- Django (1966) as Ricardo
- Texas, Adios (1966) as Juan - Delgado Henchman
- Amenaza black box (1966)
- In the Shadow of the Eagles (1966) as Publius
- Mercancía humana (1967) as Karl
- Técnica para un sabotaje (1967)
- Clint the Stranger (1967) as Sheriff
- The Glass Sphinx (1967) as Mirko
- Death on the Run (1967) as Il bulgaro
- Destino: Estambul 68 (1967) as Mike Harris
- John the Bastard (1967)
- Massacre in the Black Forest (1967)
- Django, Prepare a Coffin (1968) as Barry's Henchman
- The Belle Starr Story (1968) as Butch
- I Live for Your Death (1968) as Tracy
- Madigan's Millions (1968)
- I Want Him Dead (1968) as Sheriff
- Odia il prossimo tuo (1968) as Bill Dakota
- Crazy Westerners (1968) as Jesse James
- The Moment to Kill (1968) as Dago
- The Great Silence (1968) as Fake Sheriff in Flashback
- The Mercenary (1968) as Hudo
- Bloody Che Contra (1969) as Chino
- The Tough and the Mighty (1969) as Giovanni Cassita
- The Specialists (1969) as Romero
- The Unholy Four (1970) as Bounty Hunter with Black Cloak
- A Man Called Sledge (1970) as Poker Player
- When Heroes Die (1970)
- The Devil's Backbone (1971) as Mark
- Sumario sangriento de la pequeña Estefania (1972) as Mario Ansuini
- The Great Kidnapping (1973)
- They Still Call Me Amen (1973) as Henchman
- Nos llaman Carambola (1974) as Lt. Stevens
- The Great Adventure (1975) as Hank McKenzie
- Get Mean (1975) as Barbarian in Tavern
- Scoop! (1977)
- Uranium Conspiracy (1978) as Sailor
- Monsignor (1982) as 3rd Killer

=== As assistant director ===
- 1001 Nights (1968)
- Sumario sangriento de la pequeña Estefania (1972)
- La ruta del opio (1972)
- Order to Assassinate (1975)
- The Perfect Killer (1977)
- El trono de fuego (1983)
- National Lampoon's European Vacation (1985)

=== As production manager ===
- Noi duri (1960)

== Bibliography ==
- Curti, Roberto (13 March 2017). Riccardo Freda: The Life and Works of a Born Filmmaker. McFarland Publishing. p. 376. ISBN 9781476669700.
- Curti, Roberto (2 August 2016). Tonino Valerii: The Films. McFarland Publishing. p. 232. ISBN 9781476626185.
- Pitts, Michael R. (13 December 2012). Western Movies: A Guide to 5,105 Feature Films (2nd ed.). McFarland Publishing. p. 484. ISBN 9781476600901.
