= Baš Čelik =

Serbian fairy tale

Baš Čelik (Cyrillic: Баш Челик, pronounced [bâʃ tʃɛ̌lik]), meaning "just steel", from Serbian baš for "true, just, exact" and ćelik for "steel", is a Serbian fairy tale, collected by Vuk Karadžić. It is similar to the Brothers Grimm's "The Crystal Orb" (Aarne–Thompson type 552A).

== Synopsis ==
A king has three sons and three daughters. On his deathbed he makes his sons swear that they will marry off their sisters to the first person who asks. One night a booming voice demands that one sister be given to him. The two older brothers are reluctant, while the youngest (the Least of Three) heeds his father's dying request and hands her over. The same thing happens for the next two nights, until all the sisters are given away to mysterious strangers. The three brothers then decide to go and search for their sisters.

Throughout their travels, each brother fights many-headed serpents, the youngest tossing the serpent into a lake putting out their camp fire; so he has to go out alone to find fire, and using his wits he defeats nine giants that were terrorizing the region. Finally, he rescues a princess from the giant's village and is allowed to marry the princess. He lives in her castle and is allowed to visit any of the rooms, except one which is bound with chains (the One Forbidden Thing). When his wife is away from the castle, he goes inside the room and comes across a man bound in chains. The man calls himself Baš Čelik, and he begs for three glasses of water. Every time Čelik drains a glass, the prince receives an extra life. When the third glass is handed to him, Čelik regains his massive strength, breaks the chains, opens his wings, and flies away with the youngest son's wife.

Now the prince sets out on a new quest to rescue his wife. On the way, he discovers that his sisters were married to the Lords of Dragons, Hawks and Eagles. He visits their castles and is welcomed. But when he tells each Lord of his plans to defeat Čelik, they try to stop him, telling him its impossible. The young prince refuses to listen, so each Lord gives him a magical feather that when burned will summon their armies. He tries to rescue his wife but each time, fails and loses his life. On the fourth time he fails again and dies, but not before he burns the feathers and his body is saved by his brothers-in-law. They resurrect him using the magical water from River Jordan. At this point the prince's wife learns that Čelik cannot be killed, because his life is in a bird that is in a heart of fox in a forest of a high mountain. Helped by the Lords, the prince finally slays Čelik and rescues his wife.

== Translations ==
The name of the tale was translated as Bash Tchelik, or Real Steel. The tale was also collected by British author Elodie Lawton Mijatović and translated as Bash-Chalek, or, True Steel. A third translation of the tale renamed the antagonist Steelpacha.

== Adaptations ==
The tale was also part of Fairy Tales of the Allied Nations, a compilation of fairy tales by illustrator Edmund Dulac, with the name Bashtchelik (or, Real Steel).

== Analysis ==
In a recenzija (review) of a reedition of Vuk Karadžić's book of Serbian folk tales, Croatian folklorist Maja Bošković-Stulli also classified the tale as a combination of types: AaTh 552A + 304 ("The Dangerous Night-Watch") + 302 ("Ogre's Soul in the Egg").

Professor Andreas Johns described Serbian Bash Tchelik as a "close relative" of East Slavic character Koschei, the sorcerer, since, in the course of the story, both are released from prison by the hero, kidnap the hero's wife and hide their soul (heart, or weakness) outside his body.

== References in media ==
- Baš Čelik is the main villain in 1950 Serbian fantasy film Čudotvorni mač based on Serbian folk tales. In this film, Baš Čelik could only be slain by a particular sword. In the original legend, no weapon could harm him. Only denying him water would reduce his strength.
- Baš Čelik was the name of a former Yugoslav heavy metal band.
- Baš Čelik is part of the Monster in My Pocket series, appearing in the centerspread of issue #3 with the spelling "Bash Tchelik". There does not appear to have been a toy version, however.
- Baš Čelik is the name of a two-part song from the Dok čekaš sabah sa šejtanom album by the [Bosnian band] rock band Zabranjeno Pušenje.
- Baš Čelik is the name of the first Serbian fantasy board game.
- In 2008 fantasy artist and illustrator Petar Meseldžija published the book The Legend of Steel Bashaw with the story based on the tale.

== See also ==
- The Death of Koschei the Deathless
- The Fair Fiorita
- The Three Enchanted Princes
- The Crystal Ball (fairy tale)
