= Taras Bulba, the Cossack =

1962 film by Ferdinando Baldi

- Directed by: Ferdinando Baldi
- Written by: Nikolay Gogol (novel); Ennio De Concini
- Starring: Vladimir Medar; Jean-François Poron; Fosco Giachetti
- Cinematography: Amerigo Gengarelli
- Edited by: Renzo Lucidi
- Music by: Guido Robuschi; Gian Stellari
- Production company: I.A.C.EI.D.C.
- Distributed by: Regionale Film
- Release date: 7 September 1962
- Running time: 96 minutes
- Country: Italy
- Language: Italian

Taras Bulba, the Cossack (Italian: Taras Bulba, il cosacco) is a 1962 Italian historical adventure film directed by Ferdinando Baldi and starring Vladimir Medar, Jean-François Poron and Fosco Giachetti. It received an American release in 1970 under the title The Tartars. Based on the 1835 novel of the same title by Nikolay Gogol, it was made the same year as a much larger budget version Taras Bulba.

== Cast ==
- Vladimir Medar as Taras Bulba
- Jean-François Poron as Andrei Bulba
- Georges Reich as Ostapi
- Hugo Santana as Gurko
- Lorella De Luca as Natalia
- Fosco Giachetti as Voivode
- Sylvia Sorrente
- Erno Crisa
- Mirko Ellis
- Andrea Scotti
- Dada Gallotti

== Bibliography ==
- Roy Kinnard & Tony Crnkovich. Italian Sword and Sandal Films, 1908–1990. McFarland, 2017.
