= Mission Terra =

- Starring: Dieter Eppler
- Country of origin: West Germany

Original release
- Release: 1988 – 1990

Mission Terra is a West German television series.

== See also ==
- List of German television series
