= Love and Fashion =

- Ljubav i moda
- Directed by: Ljubomir Radičević
- Written by: Nenad Jovičić; Ljubomir Radičević
- Produced by: Branislav Drljević
- Starring: Beba Lončar; Dušan Bulajić; Mija Aleksić; Miodrag Petrović Čkalja; Jelena Žigon
- Cinematography: Nenad Jovičić
- Edited by: Milica Poličević
- Music by: Bojan Adamič; Darko Kraljić
- Release date: 1960
- Running time: 105 min
- Country: Yugoslavia
- Language: Serbo-Croatian

Love and Fashion (Serbo-Croatian: Ljubav i moda, Serbian Cyrillic: Љубав и мода) is a 1960 cult Yugoslav comedy film directed by Ljubomir Radičević. The film features actress Beba Lončar in her breakthrough role.

== Plot ==
In order to earn enough money to finance an air show, a group of college students organize a fashion show for the Jugošik ("Yugochic") company, using petty scams. The fashion show turns out to be a success, and it also helps bring Sonja, a college girl, and Bora, a young fashion designer, together, as they eventually resolve their differences.

== Cast ==
- Beba Lončar: Sonja
- Dušan Bulajić: Bora
- Mija Aleksić: general director
- Miodrag Petrović Čkalja: commercial director
- Severin Bijelić: cousin
- Miloš Žutić: Jova
- Dragan Vračar: Bata
- Mira Tapavica: Desa
- Dragoslav Ilić: Šilja
- Mića Tatić: fashion tailor
- Janez Vrhovec: aero-club director
- Jelena Žigon: Vera
- Vlastimir Đuza Stojiljković: singer
- Ivo Robić: star singer
- Gabi Novak: guest
- Miodrag Popović Deba: Ljuba
- Ljubica Otašević: stewardess
- Vladimir Medar: fashion tailor 2
- Aleksandra Ivanović: singer (Pod sjajem zvezda, Devojko mala)
- Predrag Ivanović: singer (Pod sjajem zvezda, Devojko mala)
- Desa Berić

== Soundtrack ==
The film's soundtrack has acquired fame over the years. Đuza Stojiljković, Ivo Robić and Gabi Novak appear in the film, and Arsen Dedić also plays an episodic role. The hit song Devojko mala was popularized in the eighties by the band VIS Idoli.

== Legacy ==
The Yugoslav Film Archive, in accordance with its authorities based on the Law on Cultural Heritage, declared one hundred Serbian feature films (1911–1999) as cultural heritage of great importance on December 28, 2016. Love and Fashion is also on that list.

The film, especially its soundtrack, has garnered a cult status over the years and is considered a classic in Yugoslav and Serbian cinema.

== Digital restoration ==
The Yugoslav Film Archive, in cooperation with Vip mobile and Avala Film, has digitally restored the film. The premiere of the restored version was held on June 25, 2019, in the ceremonial hall of the Archive. It had its television premiere on October 4, 2020 on the RTS 1 channel.
