= In the Shadow of the Eagles =

- Theatrical poster
- Directed by: Ferdinando Baldi
- Screenplay by: Ferdinando Baldi; Nino Milano
- Starring: Cameron Mitchell; Beba Loncar; Peter Carsten
- Cinematography: Lucky Satson
- Edited by: Otello Colangeli
- Music by: Carlo Savina
- Production companies: Avala Film; Pro-Di Cinematografica
- Release date: February 1, 1966
- Running time: 94 minutes
- Country: Italy
- Language: Italian

In the Shadow of Eagles (original title All'ombra delle aquile) is a 1966 sword-and-sandal film written and directed by Ferdinando Baldi and starring Cameron Mitchell and Beba Lončar.

== Plot ==
Emperor Tiberius is warned of the threat posed by the Germanic tribes revolting in the northern province of Pannonia. Tribune Marcus Vinditius is entrusted with the insignia of the 7th Legion and ordered by Governor Messala to subdue the rebellion. Magdus, the aging leader of the Pannonian tribes, is angry with Batone because he has compromised the peace terms with Rome, but Batone is a much younger warrior who has lost his reason and lusts for blood.

== Cast ==
- Cameron Mitchell as Marcus Venditius
- Dieter Eppler as Publius
- Aleksander Gavrić as Batone
- Paul Windsor as Messala
- Remo De Angelis as Publius
- Vladimir Medar as Magdus
- Beba Lončar as Helen
- Gabriella Pallotta as Julia
- Peter Carsten
- Beli Bolin

== See also ==
- Massacre in the Black Forest (dir. Ferdinando Baldi, 1967), with Cameron Mitchell, Beba Lončar, Dieter Eppler, Peter Carsten

== Biography ==
- Hughes, Howard (2011). Cinema Italiano - The Complete Guide From Classics To Cult. London - New York: I.B. Tauruis. ISBN 978-1-84885-608-0.
- Roberto Poppi, Mario Pecorari. Dizionario del cinema italiano. I film. Gremese Editore, 2007, ISBN 8884405033.
- Patrick Lucanio. With fire and sword: Italian spectacles on American screens, 1958 - 1968. Scarecrow Press 1994. ISBN 0810828162.
