= The Crystal Ball (fairy tale) =

German fairy tale

Folk tale
- Name: The Crystal Ball
- Aarne–Thompson grouping: ATU 552A
- Country: Germany
- Published in: Grimms' Fairy Tales

"The Crystal Ball" (German: Die Kristallkugel) is a German fairy tale collected by the Brothers Grimm, tale number 197. It is Aarne-Thompson type 552A, the girls who married animals.

== Origin ==
The Brothers Grimm indicated the origin of Die Kristallkugel as Friedmund von Arnim's book, as tale nr. 14, Vom Schloss der goldnen Sonne ("The Castle of the Golden Sun").

== Synopsis ==
A sorceress was afraid of her three sons. She turned the oldest into an eagle and the second into a whale, and each could take his human form for only two hours a day. The youngest son fled before he could suffer the same fate and went off to seek the king's daughter, bewitched and held prisoner in the Castle of the Golden Sun. He saw two giants quarreling over a wishing cap and they asked him to settle the dispute. He put on the cap, forgot he had it on, and wished himself to the castle.

The king's daughter told him that only a crystal ball would break the enchantment. She directed him to go down the mountain and fight a wild bull beside a spring. If he killed it, a bird would spring out of it. If the bird was forced to let free an egg in its body, the crystal ball was its yolk, but the egg would light everything about it on fire if dropped on the land.

He fought the bull. The bird sprang free, but his brother the eagle harried it until it dropped the egg. This landed on a fisherman's hut, setting it ablaze, but his brother the whale drowned the hut with waves. The youngest brother took the crystal ball to the enchanter, who admitted himself defeated and told him that the ball would also break the spell on his brothers. The youngest hurried to the princess, and they exchanged rings.

== In popular culture ==
- "The Crystal Ball" was featured in the anime series Grimm's Fairy Tale Classics.

== See also ==
- The Giant Who Had No Heart in His Body
- Baš Čelik
