= Don't Look in the Attic =

- Directed by: Carlo Ausino
- Screenplay by: Carlo Ausino
- Story by: Carlo Ausino
- Produced by: Carlo Ausino; Michelle Peyrette
- Starring: Beba Lončar; Jean-Pierre Aumont; Annarita Grapputo; George Ardisson
- Cinematography: Carlo Ausino
- Edited by: Giuliano Mattioli
- Music by: Stelvio Cipriani
- Production company: Antonelliana Cinematographica
- Distributed by: Cinevinci
- Release dates: 30 September 1981 (Turin); 14 May 1982 (Italy)
- Running time: 84 minutes
- Country: Italy

Don't Look in the Attic (Italian: La villa delle anime maledette–The Damned) is a 1981 Italian horror film directed and written by Carlo Ausino.

== Production ==
Don't Look in the Attic was directed by Carlo Ausino, a filmmaker who got his start in the film industry as an uncredited assistant on the set of The Organizer and made his debut as a director in L'ora della pietà. Ausino made a few attempts at science fiction films in the 1970s until his film Double Game which was released in 1977. Don't Look in the Attic was filmed in 1980 when Ausino made a deal with the French film distribution company Felix Film to use some French actors in mid-1980. The film was written in a few weeks by Ausino with Annarita Grapputo in the lead, who had previously acted in Double Game.

Filming began in June 1980 under the title La stirpe dei dannati and was shot in four weeks in Turin. The film's score credited to Stelvio Cipriani is compiled from a catalogue of his older work, including Satan's Wife .

== Release ==
Don't Look in the Attic had its premiere on September 30, 1981 in Turin as La villa delle anime maledette. Wider distribution of the film in Italy was only available on 14 May 1982. In Italy, the film was released on home video by the GVR label. Outside of Italy the film was released as House of the Damned which was mistitled as House of the Danned in the titles and Don't Look in the Attic.

== Reception ==
In Italy, Leonardo Autera gave the film a negative review in Corriere della Sera, noting poor script, direction and photography. Autera continued that the story was "extremely deranged, developing despite any logic."
