= The Magic Sword (1950 film) =

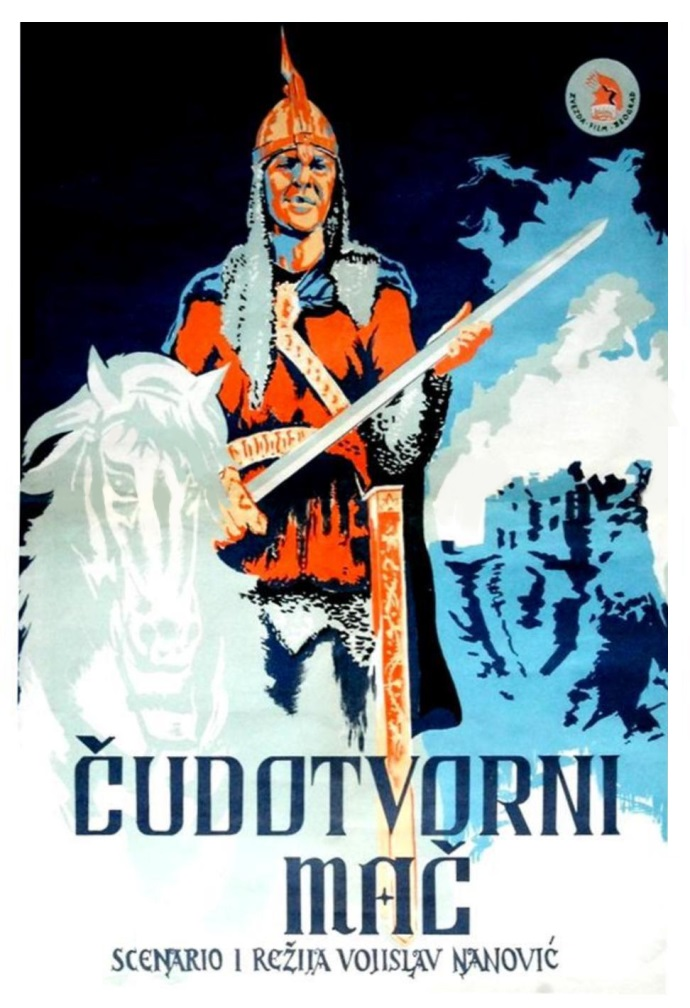
- Theatrical release poster
- Serbian: Čudotvorni mač
- Directed by: Vojislav Nanović
- Based on: "The Nine Peahens and the Golden Apples" "Baš Čelik"
- Starring: Rade Marković; Vera Ilić-Đukić; Milivoje Živanović; Marko Marinković; Bata Paskaljević; Milan Ajvaz; Ljubiša Jokanović
- Cinematography: Nenad Jovičić
- Music by: Mihajlo Vukdragović
- Distributed by: Zvezda film
- Release date: 5 August 1950
- Running time: 101 minutes
- Country: Yugoslavia
- Language: Serbo-Croatian

The Magic Sword (Serbian: Чудотворни мач / Čudotvorni mač) is a 1950 Yugoslav fantasy/adventure film directed by Vojislav Nanović which is based on Serbian folk tales, primarily "The Nine Peahens and the Golden Apples" but also including elements (such as the villain) from "Baš Čelik".

== Cast ==
- Rade Marković as Nebojša
- Vera Ilić-Đukić as Vida
- Milivoje Živanović as Baš Čelik
- Marko Marinković as Grandpa Ivan
- Bata Paskaljević as Gricko
- Milan Ajvaz as Vida's father
- Ljubiša Jovanović as The old man
- Pavle Vujisić as The knight
- Vilma Žedrinski as The empress
- Zora Zlatković as The witch

== See also ==
- Cinema of Serbia
- List of films based on Slavic mythology
