= Freddy in the Wild West =

1964 film

- Directed by: Sobey Martin
- Written by: Gustav Kampendonk
- Produced by: Artur Brauner; Willy Egger; Bosko Savic
- Starring: Freddy Quinn; Rik Battaglia; Beba Loncar
- Cinematography: Siegfried Hold
- Edited by: Walter Wischniewsky
- Music by: Lotar Olias
- Production companies: Avala Film; CCC Film
- Distributed by: Constantin Film
- Release dates: August 28, 1964 (West Germany and Italy)
- Running time: 101 minutes
- Countries: West Germany; SFR Yugoslavia; Italy
- Languages: German; Italian

Freddy in the Wild West (German: Freddy und das Lied der Prärie Italian: 6 pallottole per Ringo Kid) is a 1964 West German/Italian musical Western film directed by Sobey Martin and starring Freddy Quinn, Rik Battaglia, and Beba Lončar. Playing the small role of Olivia is Mamie Van Doren, a 1950s Hollywood sex goddess. It was co-produced with and shot on location in SFR Yugoslavia. It was one of a crop of western-set German films made in the 1960s, many of them based on works of Karl May. It is also known by the alternative title of The Sheriff Was a Lady.

== Cast ==
- Freddy Quinn as Black Bill / John Burns / Freddy
- Rik Battaglia as Steve Perkins
- Beba Lončar as Deputy Sheriff Anita Daniels
- Carlo Croccolo as Sheriff Mickey Stanton
- Trude Herr as Joana Stanton
- Josef Albrecht as Uncle Ted Daniels
- Otto Waldis as Old Joe
- Ulrich Hüls as Buck
- Klaus Dahlen as Harry
- Mariona as Saloon Singer
- Bruno W. Pantel as Barman
- Stojan 'Stole' Arandjelovic as Perkins Henchman
- Vladimir Medar as Murdock, Perkins Henchman
- Milivoje Popovic-Mavid as Perkins Henchman
- Janez Vrhovec
- Desa Beric
- Mirko Boman as Perkins Henchman
- Mamie Van Doren as Olivia

== Bibliography ==
- Lowe, Barry (2017) [2008]. Atomic Blonde: The Films of Mamie Van Doren. Jefferson, NC: McFarland. ISBN 978-0-7864-8273-3.
