= The Dreamer (1965 film) =

- Directed by: Massimo Franciosa
- Written by: Jaja Fiastri; Massimo Franciosa; Leo Pescarolo
- Starring: Beba Lončar; Margaret Lee
- Cinematography: Gianni Di Venanzo
- Music by: Piero Umiliani
- Release date: 1 October 1965
- Country: Italy
- Language: Italian

The Dreamer or Il morbidone is a 1965 Italian comedy film directed by Massimo Franciosa.

== Cast ==
- Paolo Ferrari as Giovanni
- Anouk Aimée as Valeria
- Sylva Koscina as Irene
- Beba Lončar as Laura
- Margaret Lee as Daniela
- Guido Alberti as Uncle Marco
- Ferruccio De Ceresa as Ettore
- Loredana Nusciak as Donata
- Gina Rovere as Nurse
- Jacques Herlin as Marcello
- Giuliana Lojodice as Paola
- Tatyana Pavlova as Antonia
- Vera Vergani as Giovanni Zenobi's Mother
- Moa Tahi as Oriental girl
- Renato Terra
