= The Belle Starr Story =

1968 film by Lina Wertmüller

- Film poster
- Directed by: Lina Wertmüller (as Nathan Wich); Piero Cristofani
- Written by: Lina Wertmüller (as Nathan Wich and George Brown)
- Produced by: Oscar Righini
- Starring: Elsa Martinelli; George Eastman
- Cinematography: Alessandro D'Eva; Giovanni Carlo
- Edited by: Renato Cinquini
- Music by: Charles Dumont
- Release date: May 1968
- Running time: 103 minutes
- Country: Italy
- Language: Italian

The Belle Starr Story/Il mio corpo per un poker is a 1968 Italian Spaghetti Western film co-written and co-directed by Lina Wertmüller and starring Elsa Martinelli, who also sings the title song, as a fictionalized version of the Old West outlaw Belle Starr. It is the only Spaghetti Western directed by a woman and one of the few which stars a woman in the title role. Wertmüller replaced Piero Cristofani as director in his intended directorial debut.

== Plot ==
A successful gambling woman named Belle Starr (Elsa Martinelli with red hair, freckles, and chain smoking Tiparillos) attracts the interest of fellow gambler Larry Blackie (George Eastman) who proceeds to win all her money, and her ring. Larry suggests that they play for one night with her against the pot. She throws three queens of four – and loses. At the hotel room he asks why she has thrown the queens and tells that he has seen her cards. He ducks for her shot and draws the rug under her. They hit each other and fight in bed, and then kiss. Afterwards she tells him that no one has touched her before – now they introduce themselves. He says that she is just a one-night whore to him and warns her to gamble in his territory again. She replies that he has not heard the last.

Belle looks for him in a saloon and kills four of his men in a duel. Later we see her sing a ballad of love in a saloon. He confronts her for another game. She shoots off his hat and the bells on his boots. He walks towards her and kiss her, and she lowers her gun.

She tells him her story which is shown in flash-backs, with a sadistic whip-toting uncle who has killed her parents and wants to subdue her. It also involves her relationship with the outlaw Cole Harvey, whom she loved: – She steals his gun to fight her uncle. – He rescues her, kills her uncle and takes back the gun. – She tries to steal his gun when he sleeps. They fight; he attempts to rape her and is killed by her Indian friend – whom Belle earlier rescued from her uncle's whip.

Larry offers her to join in a jewel robbery. She declines and instead gathers a gang to beat him to it, but he lets his men infiltrate the gang to take the loot. He is caught and tortured by Pinkerton agents to reveal the hiding place of the missing jewels, but he does not know. Belle appears and shoots one man, getting the drop on the others. She leaves with Larry, revealing the hiding place, in a crystal chandelier.

The two separate after she has slapped him, kissed him and he has shot off her hat. ”See you the next poker game!” he shouts.

== Cast ==
- Elsa Martinelli - Belle Starr
- Robert Woods - Cole Harvey
- George Eastman - Larry Blackie
- Francesca Righini - Jessica
- Bruno Piergentili/Dan Harrison - Pedro
- Bruno Corazzari - Pinkerton Man
- Vladimir Medar - John Shelley
- Eugene Walter - Velvet Fingers
- Remo De Angelis - Gang Member

== Reception ==
The film is episodic and akin to Bonnie and Clyde.

In his investigation of narrative structures in Spaghetti Western films, Fridlund describes the relationship between Belle Starr and Blackie as a variation on the unstable partnership between two protagonists that became frequent in Spaghetti Westerns in the wake of For a Few Dollars More. In this partnership of mixed gender the plot functions are played out on a code of sexual attraction (expressed mainly by kisses, love-making and slapping), alternating with another code of money-motivated pursuits and gunplay.
