= Devojko mala =

Single by Vlastimir "Đuza" Stojiljković
- A-side: Ljubav i moda; Sonja
- B-side: "Kli-kla-klo-klap"
- Released: 1958
- Genre: Schlager
- Label: Jugoton
- Songwriters: D. Kraljić; B. Timotijević

"Devojko mala" is a popular fifties song composed by Darko Kraljić and recorded by Vlastimir "Đuza" Stojiljković as part of the soundtrack for the 1960 musical comedy film Love and Fashion in which he was also had the starring role. The song became popular in former Yugoslavia and later in the Soviet Union, especially the version recorded by Đorđe Marjanović.

== Idoli version ==
"Devojko mala"

Song by Idoli

from the album VIS Idoli
- Released: 1981
- Recorded: RTV Zagreb studio April 1981
- Genre: New wave
- Length: 2:02
- Label: Jugoton
- Songwriters: D. Kraljić; B. Timotijević
- Producer: Ivan Stančić Piko

Serbian new wave band Idoli recorded a version on their debut release, the VIS Idoli EP. This is one of the first recorded cover versions of the track and perhaps one of the most notable and well-known versions. A promotional video was recorded for the song.

== Other cover versions ==
- Croatian calypso band Cubismo recorded a version with lyrics partially in Spanish language entitled "Nina Bonita". A former Idoli member Vlada Divljan appeared as guest on the track.
- Serbian jazz musician Duško Gojković recorded an instrumental version.
- Jewish singer Mira Soriano recorded a version with lyrics in Yiddish.
- In the USSR, in late 1960s, after restoration of Soviet-Yugoslavian friendship, a Russian cover was recorded by Emil Gorovets ("Ночным Белградом шли мы молча рядом").
- Serbian singer Predrag Cune Gojkovic recorded a version in 1963.
- Singer Srdjan Popov recorded rockabilly swing cover and music video for the song in 2021.
