= Vojislav Nanović =

Serbian screenwriter and film director

- Born: 12 August 1922; Skopje, Kingdom of Serbs, Croats, and Slovenes
- Died: 10 August 1983 (aged 60); Belgrade, SR Serbia, SFR Yugoslavia
- Occupations: Director, Writer
- Years active: 1946–1983 (film)

Vojislav Nanović (12 August 1922–10 August 1983) was a Serbian and Yugoslav screenwriter and film director. Nanović directed the first feature film from modern-day North Macedonia.

== Selected filmography ==
- The Magic Sword (1950)
- Frosina (1952)
- The Gypsy Girl (1953)

== Bibliography ==
- Cornis-Pope, Marcel & Neubauer, John. History of the Literary Cultures of East-Central Europe: Junctures and Disjunctures in the 19th and 20th Centuries: Types and Stereotypes. John Benjamins Publishing Company, 2010.
