= Slaughter of the Vampires =

- Italian theatrical release poster
- Directed by: Roberto Mauri
- Written by: Roberto Mauri
- Produced by: Dino Sant'Ambrogio
- Starring: Walter Brandi; Dieter Eppler; Graziella Granata
- Cinematography: Ugo Brunelli
- Edited by: Jenner Menghi
- Music by: Aldo Piga
- Production company: Mercur Films
- Distributed by: Mercur
- Release date: February 6, 1962 (Italy)
- Running time: 84 minutes
- Country: Italy
- Language: Italian
- Box office: ₤36 million

Slaughter of the Vampires (Italian: La strage dei vampiri) (issued in the United States as Curse of the Blood Ghouls) is a 1962 Italian horror film written and directed by Roberto Mauri. The film is set in 19th Century Austria where a newlywed couple move in to a mysterious mansion. During a ball, the wife is bitten by the vampire baron of the mansion.

A low-budget production, so much so that actor Dieter Eppler stated that many cast members went unpaid, the film was released in Italy where it grossed 36 million lira.

== Plot ==
In 19th Century Austria, a wealthy newlywed couple, Marquis Wolfgang (Walter Brandi) and his beautiful bride Louise (Graziella Granata), acquire a castle. To commemorate the occasion, Louise performs a piano piece she has written, for her guests at the ball. Louise then feels a strange sensation and retires to her room. She is visited by the Mansion Baron… a vampire (Dieter Eppler) who she originally sees at her party, though he was inconspicuous. He mysteriously enters her room, seduces the young bride and sucks her blood. This leads her to desire him. As a result, Louise's health declines, the groom is alarmed and seeks advise from his familiar doctor friend. The doctor is baffled over her condition and admits to be out of his element. This prompts Wolfgang to seeking aid from the notorious Dr. Nietzsche (Luigi Batzella). Wolfgang retrieves him, from a nearby village, but is too late as when the doctor and he arrives back his bride Louise is already dead. As the doctor diagnoses this, Wolfgang is suddenly shocked to find Louise yet still alive as she approaches him with a loving embrace. His pale bride tries to seduce her husband and sucks his blood. The doctor later seeks out Louise's hiding place and stakes her heart to her death, along with the servant Corrine, whom has also succumbed to the Baron vampire. Wolfgang's hiding spot is not found as the doctor seeks another abode in the castle. Wolfgang, whom has been bitten now twice but received blood transfusions to counter the unnatural transformation, has not entirely converted into a vampire. Wolfgang encounters and corners his adversary the blood thirsty Vampire, in a final showdown, and stakes him with spikes of an iron grating.

Thus ends the supernatural vampiric plague, in this region of Europe.

== Cast ==
- Walter Brandi as Marquis Wolfgang
- Dieter Eppler as the vampire
- Graziella Granata as Louise
- Luigi Batzella as Dr. Nietzsche
- Gena Gimmy as Corinne
- Edda Ferronao as Nietzsche's maid
- Carla Foscari as Teresa
- Maretta Procaccini as Resy
- Alfredo Rizzo as a servant

== Production ==
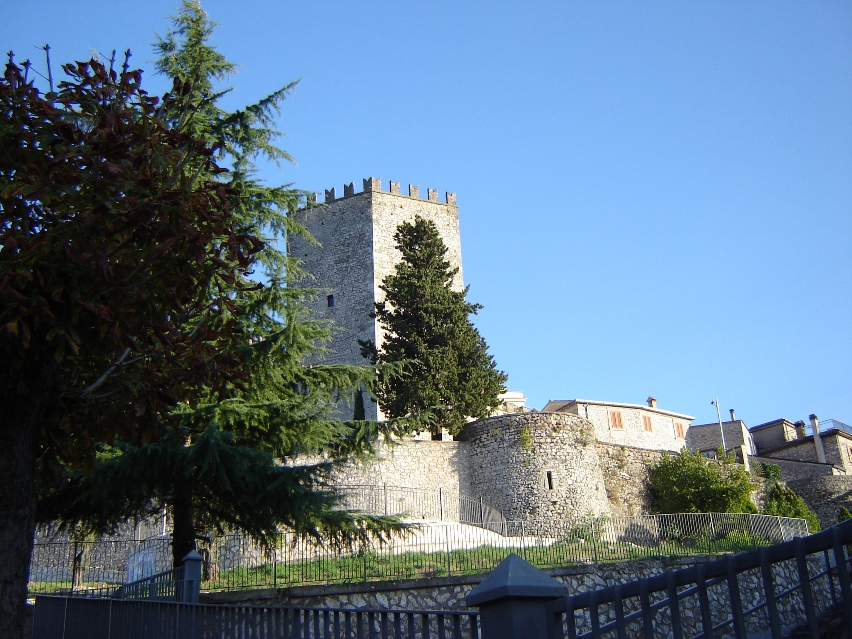
The film was shot at the Castle in Monte San Giovanni Campano

Eppler was cast in the film via an international Dino De Laurentiis production. Through Laurentiis' brother Luigi, Eppler was cast as a police inspector in a film that never started production due to a lack of funds. Eppler described Slaughter as a low budget production with actors not being paid. Filming took place at the Castle d'Aquino in Monte San Giovanni Campano.

== Release ==
Slaughter of the Vampires was distributed in Italy by Mercur Films when it was released on February 6, 1962. The film grossed a total of 36 million Italian lira on its theatrical run in Italy (est. USD$58,452). It was retitled upon re-release in the United States on June 4, 1969 as Curse of the Blood Ghouls.

Image Entertainment released a DVD under the title Slaughter of the Vampires in 2005. A second DVD was issued in 2007 by Dark Sky Films with its full runtime but was re-framed to fit 16x9.

== Reception ==
In a contemporary review, The Monthly Film Bulletin described the film as "a remarkably un-chilling piece" noting poor acting and dubbing. The review concluded that the film was "so incredibly banal that it almost entertains."

In a retrospective review, Danny Shipka, author of Perverse Titillation: The Exploitation Cinema of Italy, Spain and France, 1960-1980 described Dieter Eppler's vampire character as "one of the campiest vampires in history" The review concluded that the "film is a hoot thanks to some of the most outlandish dubbing ever, making the film appear more like an MST3k episode than a serious thriller."

== See also ==
- List of Italian films of 1962
- List of horror films of 1962
- Vampire film

== Notes ==
=== References ===
- Curti, Roberto (2015). Italian Gothic Horror Films, 1957-1969. McFarland. ISBN 978-1476619897.
- Shipka, Danny (2011). Perverse Titillation: The Exploitation Cinema of Italy, Spain and France, 1960-1980. McFarland. ISBN 978-0-7864-4888-3.
