= Vlastimir Đuza Stojiljković =

Serbian actor

Đuza Stojiljković
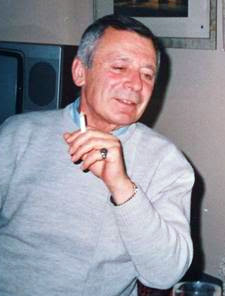
- Stojiljković in 1991
- Born: Vlastimir Stojiljković; 30 June 1929; Ražanj, Morava Banovina, Kingdom of Serbs, Croats, and Slovenes
- Died: 17 June 2015 (aged 85); Belgrade, Serbia
- Occupation: Actor
- Years active: 1957–2015

Vlastimir "Đuza" Stojiljković (Serbian Cyrillic: Властимир Ђуза Стојиљковић; 30 June 1929 – 17 June 2015) was a Serbian actor and singer. He appeared in more than 120 films and television shows between 1957 and 2015. As a singer, he is best known for his 1958 hit Devojko mala ("Little Girl"), which was appeared in the 1960 musical comedy Love and Fashion.
