= Miloš Žutić =

Serbian actor

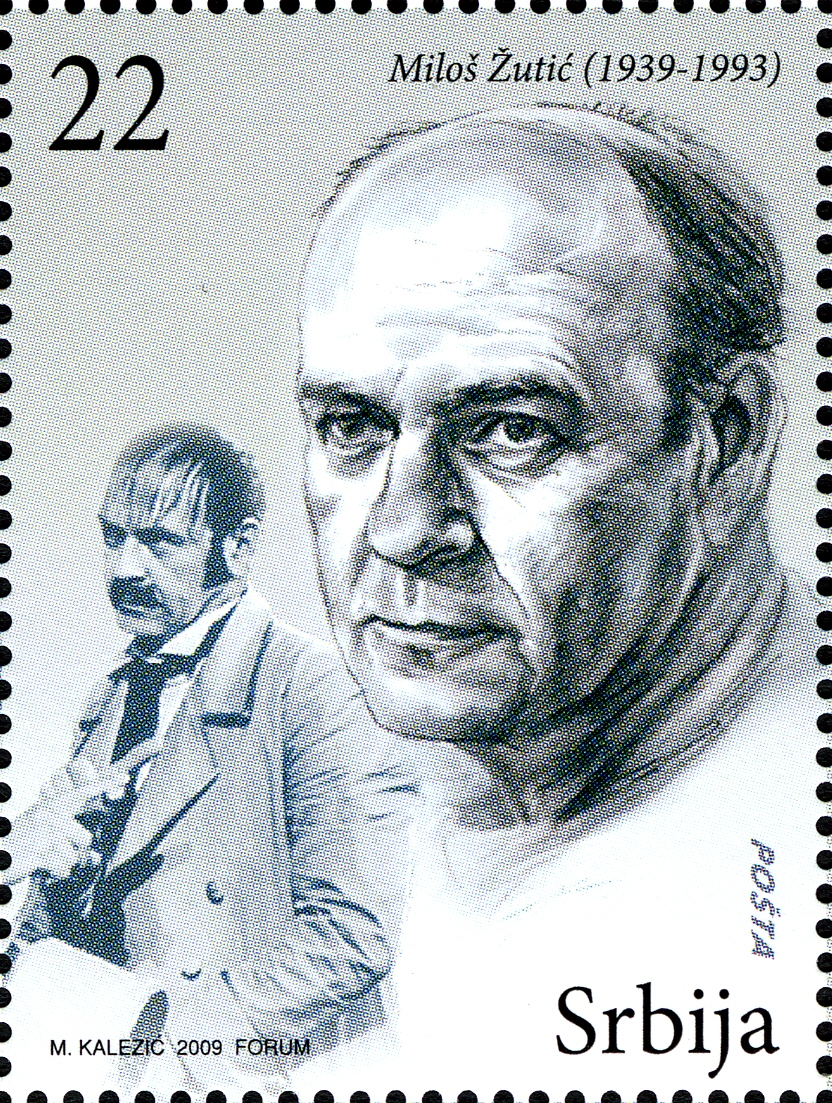
- Žutić on a 2009 Serbian Postage Stamp
- Born: 16 November 1939; Belgrade, Kingdom of Yugoslavia
- Died: 30 August 1993 (aged 53); Belgrade, FR Yugoslavia
- Occupation: Actor
- Years active: 1960–1992

Miloš Žutić (16 November 1939 – 30 August 1993) was a Serbian actor. He appeared in more than one hundred films from 1960 to 1992.

== Selected filmography ==
Film
Year	Title	Role	Notes
1960	Love and Fashion	Jova	
1989	Battle of Kosovo	Lazar of Serbia	
1986	Dancing in Water	Kica	
1980	Petria's Wreath	Ing. Markovic	
1961	And Love Has Vanished	Dejan	

TV
Year	Title	Role	Notes
1987–1988	Vuk Karadžić	Jovan Hadžić	
1987–1991	Bolji život	Svetislav "Baron" Baronov	
