= Three (1965 film) =

- Directed by: Aleksandar Petrović
- Written by: Aleksandar Petrović (screenplay); Antonije Isaković (story)
- Starring: Bata Živojinović; Kole Angelovski; Stole Aranđelović; Dragomir Bojanić; Milan Jelić
- Cinematography: Tomislav Pinter
- Edited by: Mirjana Mitić
- Release date: 1965
- Running time: 80 minutes
- Country: Yugoslavia
- Languages: Serbo-Croatian; German

Three (Serbo-Croatian: Tri, Serbian Cyrillic: Три) is a 1965 Yugoslav film directed by Aleksandar Petrović. It was nominated for the Academy Award for Best Foreign Language Film at the 39th Academy Awards. The script, written by Petrović, is based on the motifs of the short story collection Fern and Fire by Antonije Isaković. The film belongs to the Yugoslav Black Wave movement.

== Plot ==
In April 1941, the Third Reich invaded the Kingdom of Yugoslavia. The protagonist, Miloš, witnesses violent death on three separate occasions - at the beginning, during, and at the end of the Second World War. The first story takes place at a train station where, after the outbreak of the April War, mobilized members of the royal army gather and declare a photographer without identity papers and with a speech impediment a German spy and execute him. The second story shows Miloš, who joined the partisans, pursued by German soldiers. He meets a fellow partisan who, after they flee together through a swamp, sacrifices himself for him, allowing Miloš to escape. The third story takes place shortly after liberation. Miloš, now an OZNA officer, must decide whether a group of German collaborators, including a girl he is attracted to, will be shot.

== Cast ==
- Bata Živojinović as Miloš Bojanić
- Slobodan Perović as accused photographer
- Senka Veletanlić as girl
- Voja Mirić as partisan
- Dragomir Gidra Bojanić as police constable
- Mića Tomić as instigator
- Branislav Jerinić as commander
- Nikola Kole Angelovski as recruit
- Milan Jelić as recruit waiting for train
- Mirjana Kodžić as woman waiting for train
- Vesna Krajina as Vera
- Zlatibor Stoimirov as lieutenant
- Gizela Vuković as woman with headscarf
- Ali Raner as young man
- Stole Aranđelović
- Laza Jovanović
- Rajko Savelić

== Themes ==
The theme of the film is death from the perspective of one man, in three forms: as witness of it, as a victim of it, and as an executor. Petrović stated:

''Three'' is an anti-war film. It shows the true face of war - its horrors and its absurdity. The real protagonist of this film is death. In this film, it appears in three forms - as punishment, as victim, and as an expression of the senselessness of war. One needs to be against war, but one needs to be against war as a matter of principle, against anybody who wages war, and also against those who create reasons for war.

== Reception ==
A review from the New York Times from 1967 after the film's nomination for Best Foreign Film at the Academy Awards reads:

"War’s utter bestiality and waste, usually illustrated by armies, is brought into sharp focus by a talented few in “Three,” a prize-winning Yugoslav drama that treats its bleak and harrowing subject with a grim but poetic artistry. It had a showing at the New York Film Festival last year, and is now at the Studio Cinema and 72d Street Theaters. The film is mystifyingly abrupt in its transitions, but its effects, physical and intellectual, are unmistakably forceful and chilling. The director, Aleksandar Petrovic, with the aid of a sparse script and stunning photography by Tomislav Pinter, has pointed up war’s ravages as it affects one partisan’s fights in one small sector of the conflict. In each of three events he is part of, needless death brought about by fear, despair and defeat."

== Accolades ==
=== Awards ===
==== Pula Film Festival (1965) ====
- Golden Arena for Best Actor (Bata Živojinović)
- Golden Arena for Best Director (Aleksandar Petrović)
- Critics' award "Milton Manaki"

Palenka award at the Acapulco Film Festival

Laceno d'oro award at the Avellino Neorealism Film Festival

=== Nominations ===
Academy Award for Best Foreign Language Film in 1966

Crystal Globe for best film at the Karlovy Vary International Film Festival in 1966

=== Festivals ===
Poretta Terme International Film Festival (1966)

New York Film Festival (1966)

== Legacy ==
The Yugoslav Film Archive, in accordance with its authorities based on the Law on Cultural Heritage, declared one hundred Serbian feature films (1911-1999) as cultural heritage of great importance on December 28, 2016. Three is also on that list.

Aleksandar Petrović's films Three and I Even Met Happy Gypsies are cited as providing the world an introduction to Yugoslav cinema.

== See also ==
- List of submissions to the 39th Academy Awards for Best Foreign Language Film
- List of Yugoslav submissions for the Academy Award for Best Foreign Language Film
