= It Rains in My Village =

It Rains in My Village Biće skoro propast sveta
- Directed by: Aleksandar Petrović
- Written by: Aleksandar Petrović
- Starring: Annie Girardot; Ivan Palúch; Gidra Bojanić; Eva Ras; Mija Aleksić
- Cinematography: Alain Levent; Djordje Nikolić
- Edited by: Katarina Stojanović
- Music by: Aleksandar Petrović and Vojislav Kostić
- Release date: 1968
- Running time: 84 minutes
- Language: Serbo-Croatian Official Website

It Rains in My Village (Serbo-Croatian: Biće skoro propast sveta, lit. 'The End of the World Is Nigh') is a 1968 Yugoslav film by Serbian director Aleksandar Petrović, partly inspired by the novel Demons by Fyodor Dostoevsky.

== Plot ==
A mentally challenged girl is defended by a young man who takes care of pigs. He gets into a fight with the local saloon keeper, prompting the man to get the boy drunk and bribe a priest into marrying the boy to the unfortunate girl. A female teacher arrives in town to teach women how to paint. She uses the young boy as a model and then as a toy for her pleasure. The teacher subsequently takes another lover and abandons the young man, claiming that she was unaware of his marriage. The young boy eventually kills his wife, but his father takes the blame for the crime and confesses his sins before he dies in prison. As a conclusion to this sad movie, the townspeople punish the young boy for what he has done.

== Themes ==
Typical "film noire" plot of the film is not the main message of the film. The film is about fighting good against evil, and how criticism of government by Petrović reached another level as battle between good, in the character of mentally challenged Goca, and evil, in most of the characters in the film. Other themes that run through the movie are: selfishness, prudence, jealousy, rejection of right values, and the decline of society. The end of the movie shows how easy evil can be spread and infect people who are in touch with it.

== Cast ==
- Annie Girardot - Reza
- Ivan Palúch - Trisa
- Eva Ras - Goca
- Mija Aleksić - Joska
- Dragomir "Gidra" Bojanić - Pilot
- Bata Živojinović - Policeman

== Awards ==
The film was nominated for a Palme d'Or (Golden Palm) at the 1969 Cannes Film Festival. The film was also selected as the Yugoslavian entry for the Best Foreign Language Film at the 41st Academy Awards, but was not accepted as a nominee.

== See also ==
- List of Yugoslavian films
- List of submissions to the 41st Academy Awards for Best Foreign Language Film
- List of Yugoslav submissions for the Academy Award for Best Foreign Language Film
