= Aleksandar Petrović (film director) =

Yugoslav/Serbian film director (1929-1994)

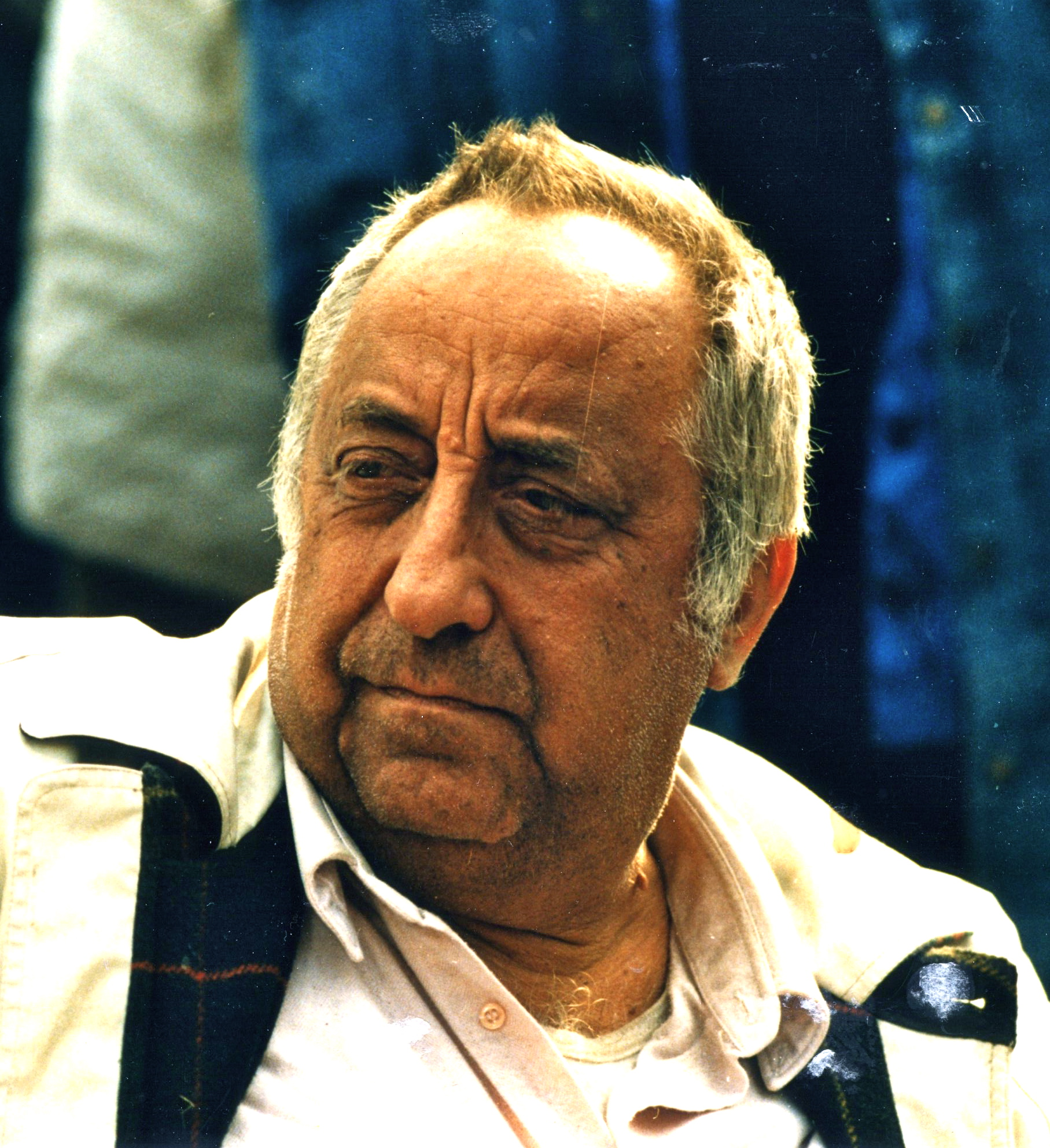
- Petrović in 1987
- Born: 14 January 1929; Paris, France
- Died: 20 August 1994 (aged 65); Paris, France
- Resting place: Père Lachaise Cemetery
- Other name: Aleksandar Petrovitch
- Occupations: Film director and screenwriter
- Years active: 1955–1989
- Awards: Cannes Palme d'Or; Pula Golden Arena for Best Director; 1965 Three; 1967 I Even Met Happy Gypsies; 1972 The Master and Margaret
- Website: www.aleksandarpetrovic.org

Aleksandar "Saša" Petrović (14 January 1929 – 20 August 1994) was a Serbian film director. He was one of the major figures of the Yugoslav Black Wave.

== Biography ==
After making several short films, Petrović gained international recognition when his second feature film, And Love Has Vanished, was nominated for the Palme d'Or at the 1962 Cannes Film Festival. Four years later, he received his first Academy Award nomination when Three was nominated for the Academy Award for Best Foreign Language Film at the 39th Academy Awards.

Petrović's next film, I Even Met Happy Gypsies (also called Feather Gatherers), would turn out to be one of his most important. It was the first film that depicted the quotidian aspects of Romani society and everyday life. Most of the actors were themselves Romani, and it was the first feature film in the Romani language. Petrović was inspired by his experiences with the Romani in his youth, saying, "As a child, I observed them and saw in these people faith and irrationality." The film was nominated for the Oscar for Best Foreign Language Film at the 1967 Academy Awards and won the FIPRESCI Prize and the Grand Prize of the Jury at the Cannes Film Festival. It also received a nomination for a Golden Globe. In 1967 Petrović was a member of the jury at the 17th Berlin International Film Festival.

Petrović's next film, It Rains in My Village, earned him another Palme d'Or nomination and is one of his most well-known movies. Petrović found inspiration for the film in Fyodor Dostoyevsky's novel The Possessed. He followed it with another literary adaptation, The Master and Margaret, which he adapted from the novel by Mikhail Bulgakov. The Italian-Yugoslav co-production was Yugoslavia's official entry for Best Foreign Language Film at the 45th Academy Awards.

Like Bulgakov, Petrović soon found himself the target of state repression. In 1973, he was forced to leave his post at the Belgrade Film Academy after being accused of holding anti-communist views by the government of Yugoslavia. In late December 1989, he joined the founding committee of the Democratic Party in Serbia, the first opposition anti-communist party in Serbia.

Petrović also wrote hundreds of articles and several books over the course of his career, including Novi film I: 1960-1965 and Novi film II: Crni film (1965-1970).

He died in Paris on 20 August 1994.

== Filmography ==
Feature films
Year	Film	Other notes
1958	The Only Way Out ("The Only Exit") (Jedini izlaz)	Director
1961	And Love Has Vanished ("When Love Has Gone") (Dvoje)	Director, writer Nominated—Palme d'Or at the Cannes Film Festival
1963	Days (Dani)	Director
1965	Three (Tri)	Director, writer Pula Big Golden Arena for Best Yugoslav Film; Pula Golden Arena for Best Director; Nominated—Academy Award for Best Foreign Language Film; Grand Prix for Best Film Karlovy Vary International Festival
1967	I Even Met Happy Gypsies (Skupljači perja)	Director, writer Pula Big Golden Arena for Best Yugoslav Film; Pula Golden Arena for Best Director; Nominated—Academy Award for Best Foreign Language Film; Nominated—Golden Globe Award for Best Foreign Language Film; WON—Grand Prix Special du Jury and International Critics Award FIPRESCI at the Cannes Film Festival
1968	It Rains in My Village (Biće skoro propast sveta)	Director, writer Nominated—Palme d'Or at the Cannes Film Festival
1972	The Master and Margaret (Majstor i Margarita)	Director, Based on the novel by Mikhail Bulgakov writer in collaboration with Barbara Alberti, Amedeo Pagani; Pula Big Golden Arena for Best Yugoslav Film; Pula Golden Arena for Best Director
1977	Group Portrait with a Lady (Grupni portret s damom)	Director, writer after the novel by Nobel prize winner Heinrich Böll, Nominated—Palme d'Or at the Cannes Film Festival
1981	The Falcon (Banović Strahinja)	Writer only
1988	Migrations (Seobe)	Director, script and dialogues in collaboration with Jacques Doniol-Valcroze

Documentaries and short films
Year	Film	Other notes
1955	SHOULDER TO SHOULDER ("Side by side") (UZ DRUGA JE DRUG)	Director
1956	FLIGHT OVER THE SWAMP ("Flight Above The Marshes") (LET NAD MOČVAROM)	Director
1957	PETAR DOBROVIĆ	Director
1958	THE ROADS (PUTEVI)	Director
1960	THE WAR ON WAR (War Against The War") (RAT RATU)	Director
1964	RECORD ("The Data") (ZAPISNIK)	Director
1965	ASSEMBLIES ("Fairs") (SABORI)	Director
