= Graziella Granata =

Italian actress

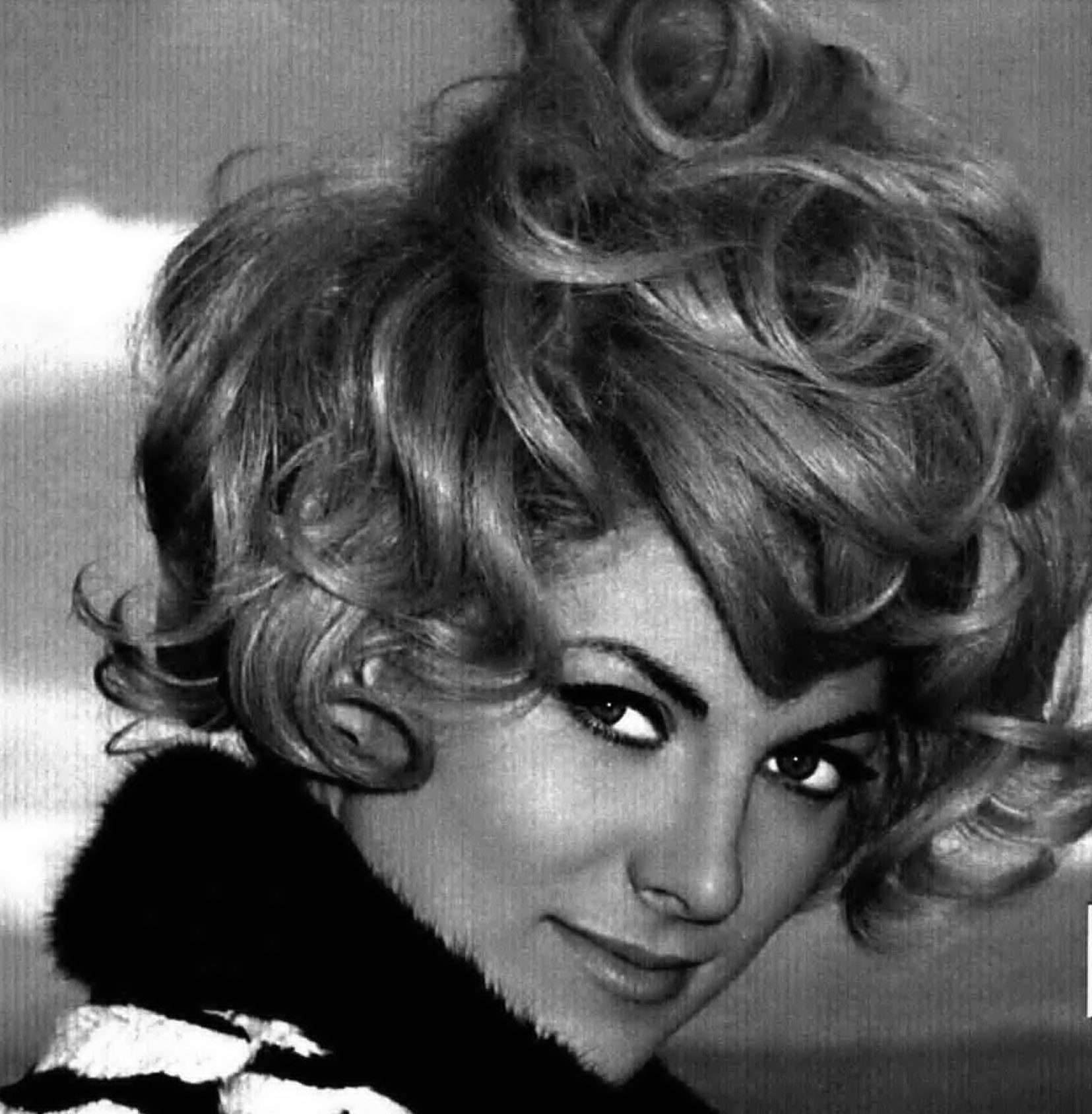
- Born: 16 March 1941 (age 85); Rome, Kingdom of Italy
- Occupation: Actress

Graziella Granata (born 16 March 1941) is an Italian retired film and stage actress.

== Career ==
After graduating at the Centro Sperimentale di Cinematografia, and after some secondary roles in adventure films and comedies, thanks to a film contract with Angelo Rizzoli film production Graziella Granata from the mid-sixties obtained good roles in films of a certain importance. She worked with, among others, Pasquale Festa Campanile, Massimo Franciosa, Mario Camerini, Luigi Comencini and especially Alessandro Blasetti, who provided her some important roles, including the leading role in the 1967 commedia all'italiana La ragazza del bersagliere, for which she shared a David di Donatello for Best Actress with Silvana Mangano. She played Louise, a victim of a vampire in the 1962 horror film Slaughter of the Vampires, which was her only horror role.

Despite this, however, she failed to launch her career, and after some spaghetti Westerns and poliziotteschi, Granata, at the beginning of the seventies, dedicated herself to the theater and shortly after retired from showbiz.
