= Dieter Eppler =

German television actor and director (1927–2008)

Dieter Eppler (11 February 1927 – 12 April 2008) was a German television actor and director of radio dramas. He was born in Stuttgart. He was an actor, known for Jonas (1957), The Country Doctor (1987) and The Last Winter (1960). He was married to Magdalene Schnaitmann and they had five children. He was a prolific German character actor, seen in many TV crime series like Tatort, Derrick and The Old Fox. In the 1950s and 1960s, he had leading roles in several Edgar Wallace adaptations. Often portraying military types, he was noted for his starring role in U 47 – Kapitänleutnant Prien (1957). He also did horror as in the character of the evil vampire in the 1962 film Slaughter of the Vampires. He stayed in Germany and worked there and in European films until his death in Stuttgart in 2008.

== Filmography ==
- 1956: Der Hexer (TV film), as Wachtmeister Carter
- 1957: Jonas, as M.S.
- 1958: The Green Devils of Monte Cassino, as Karl Christiansen
- 1958: U 47 – Kapitänleutnant Prien, as Kapitän Günther Prien
- 1958: Kleine Leute mal ganz groß, as Hans von Cleve
- 1959: The Head, as Paul Lerner
- 1959: Der Frosch mit der Maske, as Joshua Broad
- 1959: Freddy unter fremden Sternen, as Ted O'Connor
- 1960: Under Ten Flags, as Dr. Hartmann
- 1960: The Terrible People, as Mr. Crayley
- 1960: The Last Winter, as Oberleutnant Ahlbach
- 1960: Stahlnetz: E ... 605 (TV series episode), as Charly Siegert
- 1961: Der Orgelbauer von St. Marien, as Walter Bertram
- 1961: Biographie eines Schokoladentages (TV film), as Herr Stockhahn alias Herr A.T. Stickman
- 1962: Il segno del vendicatore
- 1962: Affäre Blum (TV film), as Hans Fischer
- 1962: Venus fra Vestø, as Kaptjan Weiss
- 1962: Slaughter of the Vampires, as The Vampire
- 1963: The White Spider, as Summerfield
- 1963: The Strangler of Blackmoor Castle, as Anthony the Butler
- 1963: Piccadilly Zero Hour 12, as Sergeant Howard Slatterly
- 1964: The Secret of Dr. Mabuse, as Kaspar
- 1964: The Inn on Dartmoor, as Mr. Gray
- 1964: Frühstück mit dem Tod, as Polizeileutenant Keller
- 1964: Lana, Queen of the Amazons, as Giovanni di Araúza / Gerónimo de Araújo
- 1965: Geld Geld Geld – Zwei Milliarden gegen die Bank von England (TV film), as SS-Sturmbannführer Addi Naumann
- 1965: The Sinister Monk, as Sir Williams
- 1966: I Deal in Danger, as Dr. Stolnitz
- 1966: Die Nibelungen, Teil 1: Siegfried, as Rüdiger von Bechlarn
- 1966: Savage Pampas, as Rivera
- 1966: In the Shadow of the Eagles, as Batone
- 1967: Die Nibelungen, Teil 2: Kriemhilds Rache, as Rüdiger von Bechlarn
- 1967: Lucky, the Inscrutable, as Secuaz de Gafas de Oro
- 1967: Spy Today, Die Tomorrow, as Captain Reichel
- 1967: The Blood Demon, as The Coachman
- 1967: Massacre in the Black Forest
- 1968: Death and Diamonds, as Tomasio
- 1968: Uden en trævl, as Kurt von Asbach
- 1968/69: The Last Roman, as Thorismund
- 1969: Dead Body on Broadway, as Cindy's agent (uncredited)
- 1970: General Oster – Verräter oder Patriot? (TV film)
- 1970: Deep End, as Stoker
- 1970: Die U-2-Affäre (TV film), as Oberst Shelton
- 1970: Tatort (TV Series), as Kommissar Liersdahl / Gastkommissar Liersdahl / Wilhelm Zander / Bossie / Eduard Kern
- 1971: Theodor Kardinal Innitzer (TV film), as Bürckl, Gauleiter
- 1972: Die Pueblo-Affäre (TV film), as Lacy
- 1972: Mit dem Strom (TV film), as Ermisch, Kriminalkommissar
- 1972: Life Is Tough, Eh Providence?, as Sheriff Howard Pendleton
- 1973: Zu einem Mord gehören zwei (TV film), as Bonard
- 1974: Wer stirbt schon gerne unter Palmen
- 1976: Derrick (TV Series), as Dr Schöller / Polizeeichef / Oppler / Bache / Various Characters
- 1976: Vera Romeyke Is Not Acceptable, as Herr Gaub
- 1977: Halbzeit (TV film)
- 1978: Grüß Gott, ich komm von drüben (TV film), as Stegmaier
- 1981: Goldene Zeiten (TV miniseries)
- 1984: The Sprinter, as Siegfried Dietrich
- 1985: Seitenstechen
- 1985: Beinah Trinidad (TV film)
- 1985: The Old Fox (TV), as Zeisinger / Einsatzleiter
- 1985: Mission Terra (TV series)
- 1987: The Black Forest Clinic (TV series)
- 1988: Der Schatz im Niemandsland (TV series)
- 1989: Mit Leib und Seele (TV series), as Bürgermeister Rösner / Bürgermeister Rösler
- 1990: Abenteuer Airport (TV series), as Direktor Tiedemann
- 1991: Zwei Schlitzohren in Antalya (TV series)
- 1991: Der Goldene Schnitt (TV film)
- 1991: Bilder machen Leute (TV film)
- 1994: Der König von Bärenbach (TV series)
- 1994: Three Days in April (TV film), as Steigmaier
- 1999: Kanadische Träume – Eine Familie wandert aus (TV miniseries)
- 1999: Das verbotene Zimmer (TV film), as Kurt Krumholz
- 2000: Jugendsünde (TV film), as Klemm
- 2000: Stimme des Herzens (TV film), as Herr Heinze
- 2001: Alle meine Töchter (TV series), as Josef (final appearance)
