= Massacre in the Black Forest =

1967 film

- Directed by: Ferdinando Baldi; Rudolf Nussgruber
- Screenplay by: Ferdinando Baldi; Adriano Bolzoni; Alessandro Ferrau
- Starring: Cameron Mitchell; Antonella Lualdi; Hans Von Borsody
- Cinematography: Lucky Satson
- Edited by: Otello Colangeli
- Music by: Carlo Savina
- Production companies: Debora Film; Avala Film; Peter Carsten Productions
- Release dates: 1967 (Italy); 3 February 1977 (West Germany)
- Countries: Italy; Yugoslavia; West Germany

Massacre in the Black Forest (German: Hermann der Cherusker – Die Schlacht im Teutoburger Wald) is a 1967 historical drama film set on the northeast frontier of the Roman Empire facing the area of Germania in A.D. 9. The film centers on Arminius, a chieftain of the Cherusci Germanic tribe (in what is now Lower Saxony), who drew three Roman legions into an ambush in the Teutoburg Forest, known as the Battle of the Teutoburg Forest.

== Cast ==
- Hans von Borsody as Arminius
- Antonella Lualdi as Thusnelda
- Cameron Mitchell as Consul Aulus Caecina, in German version - Aulus Colonna
- Beba Lončar as Livia, Aulus Caecina's lover
- Dieter Eppler as Rupert
- Peter Carsten as Sigmund
- as Segestes
- Remo de Angelis as Publius Quintilius Varus
- Aleksandar Gavric as Drusus the Younger
- Vladimir Medar as Epamione, merchant
- Paul Windsor as Curio, Roman officer
- Beli Bolin as Roman legionary

== Release ==
The film was released in 1967.

== Footnotes ==
=== References ===
- Kinnard, Roy; Crnkovich, Tony (2017). Italian Sword and Sandal Films, 1908–1990. Jefferson, NC: McFarland. ISBN 978-1-4766-6291-6.

== See also ==
- In the Shadow of the Eagles (dir. Ferdinando Baldi, 1966), with Cameron Mitchell, Beba Lončar, Dieter Eppler, Peter Carsten
- List of historical drama films
- List of films set in ancient Rome
- List of German films: 1960s
- Battle of the Teutoburg Forest
