= Avala Film =

Serbian film studio

Coordinates: 44°45′20″N 20°26′1″E

Avala Studios
- Industry: Film
- Founded: 15 July 1946; 80 years ago
- Founder: State Committee of Cinematography (Yugoslavia)
- Headquarters: Kneza Višeslava 88, Belgrade, Serbia

Avala Studios, formerly known as Avala Film (Serbian Cyrillic: Aвала филм), is a Serbian film studio, founded in 1946 as the first studio founded in post-war Yugoslavia.

== Overview ==
Official logo of Avala Film in 1973

In June 1946, the government of the Socialist Federal Republic of Yugoslavia created the State Committee of Cinematography, in order to replace the provisional Film Enterprise of the SFRY. The Committee set out to establish film production companies in the various constituent states of Yugoslavia: the first and the largest of those was Avala Film, in the Socialist Republic of Serbia's capital Belgrade, which was founded on 15 July. The company was located in the future complex of Filmski Grad, which the committee had only begun planning.

In 1947, Avala Film produced the first feature film made in postwar Yugoslavia, Vjekoslav Afrić's Slavica. Until 2000, the studio participated in the creation of 400 documentaries, 200 feature films and 120 co-productions with foreign companies; its pictures won more than 200 awards in various festivals.

After the Breakup of Yugoslavia, the studio was partially privatized and 51% of its shares were sold to a company called Jugoexport, while the rest were retained by Avala Film's management. Since the mid-1990, it has produced only a few films, and its last one - Shadows of Memories - was released in 2000.

In early 2000-s, the studio was facing financial troubles, and was threatened with liquidation after Jugoexport was declared bankrupt. Since 2005, plans to fully privatize it were proposed. In 2008, the studio was valued at 105 million euros and had 84 employees. In June 2011, the studio was announced to be bankrupt, after accumulating a debt of 111 million dinars. The company's real estate, film rights, costumes, props and studios were scheduled to be sold-off in spring 2013.

== Selected filmography ==
- 1953 - Perfidy
- 1957 - Priests Ćira and Spira
- 1961 - Siberian Lady Macbeth
- 1964 - March on the Drina (Marš na Drinu)
- 1965 - Three
- 1966 - The Dream
- 1967 - I Even Met Happy Gypsies
- 1968 - It Rains in My Village
- 1970 - Liberation
- 1987 - Reflections
- 1989 - The Meeting Point

== Selected international co-productions ==
- 1954 - The Last Bridge
- 1962 - Taras Bulba
- 1963 - The Long Ships
- 1964 - Marco the Magnificent (La Fabuleuse aventure de Marco Polo)
- 1965 - Genghis Khan
- 1967 - The 25th Hour
- 1968 - Kelly's Heroes
- 1969 - Castle Keep
- 1972 - England Made Me
- 1984 - Quo Vadis? (miniseries)
- 1986 - Escape from Sobibor (TV movie)
- 1987 - The Fortunate Pilgrim (miniseries)
- 1987 - Crusoe
- 1988 - Around the World in 80 Days (miniseries)
- 1989 - Boris Godunov
